= List of Russian films of 2022 =

A list of films produced in Russia in 2022 (see 2022 in film).

== Film releases ==
Opening		Title	Russian title	Cast and crew	Details
J A N U A R Y	1	A Portrait of a Stranger	Портрет незнакомца	Director: Sergey Osipyan; Cast: Yuri Butorin, Kirill Pirogov	
J A N U A R Y	6	Project Gemini	Звёздный разум	Director: Vyacheslav Lisnevsky; Cast: Egor Koreshkov, Alyona Konstantinova, Konstantin Samoukov	KD Studios
J A N U A R Y	6	Swingers	Свингеры	Director: Dmitry Fiks, Andreys Ekis; Cast: Dmitry Nagiyev, Irina Pegova	
J A N U A R Y	20	Our Children	Тайна	Director: Artyom Aksenenko; Cast: Diana Enakaeva, Oksana Akinshina, Pyotr Fyodorov, Diana Pozharskaya	The White Nights film distribution company / First Films
J A N U A R Y	27	Maria. Save Moscow	Мария. Спасти Москву	Director: Vera Storozheva; Cast: Mariya Lugovaya, Artur Smolyaninov, Ilya Malakov, Sergei Puskepalis	The action takes place during the Battle of Moscow in 1941.
F E B R U A R Y	3	It's Not Her Name	Другое имя	Director: Veta Geraskina; Cast: Svetlana Khodchenkova, Jakob Diehl, Ekaterina Fedina, Alexandra Krotkova	The White Nights film distribution company / Vega Film
F E B R U A R Y	3	Disobedient	Непослушник	Director: Vladimir Kott; Cast: Viktor Khorinyak, Aglaya Tarasova, Taisiya Vilkova	"KaroRental" Film Distribution / Megogo Studios
F E B R U A R Y	10	The Faberge Egg	Яйцо Фаберже	Director: Ilya Farfel; Cast: Nikolay Naumov, Maksim Lagashkin	
F E B R U A R Y	17	Eleven Silent Men	Одиннадцать молчаливых мужчин	Director: Alexey Pimanov; Cast: Makar Zaporozhsky, Pavel Trubiner, Roman Kurtsyn, Andrey Chernyshov, Evgeniya Lapova, Alyona Kolomina, Dmitry Belotzerkovsky	Central Partnership / With Pimanov & Partners; The film is the story of the legendary trip of Soviet football players "FC Dynamo Moscow" to Great Britain in November 1945.
F E B R U A R Y	17	Palmira	Однажды в пустыне	Director: Andrei Kravchuk; Cast: Aleksandr Robak, Pavel Chinaryov, Aleksandr Metyolkin, Ekaterina Nesterova, Igor Gordin	"KaroRental" Film Distribution / Rock Films
F E B R U A R Y	17	The Syndrome	Синдром	Director: Vyacheslav Rudenko; Cast: Ilya Korobko, Darya Melnikova, Timofey Dashuk, Varvara Verkhovykh, Vitaliy Krylov	Capella Film / Lumart Production / 7 Hills
F E B R U A R Y	17	When She Comes	Когда она приходит	Director: Aleksandr Tsoy; Cast: Alevtina Tukan, Pyotr Skvortsov, Aglaya Tarasova, Ekaterina Malikova, Nikita Tarasov	KaroFilm / Stella Releasing / VGIK
F E B R U A R Y	23	Mister Knockout	Мистер Нокаут	Director: Artyom Mikhalkov; Cast: Viktor Khorinyak, Sergey Bezrukov, Angelina Strechina, Inga Oboldina, Evgeniya Dmitrieva	Walt Disney Studios
F E B R U A R Y	23	Dads	Папы	Director: Armen Ananikyan; Cast: Dmitry Nagiyev, Sergey Bezrukov	
F E B R U A R Y	24	Behind Closed Doors	Многоэтажка	Director: Anton Maslov; Cast: Darya Shcherbakova	
M A R C H	3	Brother in Every Inch	Брат во всем	Director: Alexander Zolotukhin; Cast: Nikolay Zhuravlyov, Sergey Zhuravlyov, Aleksandra Shevyryova, Mikhail Klabukov, Egor Kutushov	Pioner Cinema; The story is about the separation of two twin brothers who study together at a military school to become pilots. The film will premiere in February 2022 at the 72nd Berlin International Film Festival.
M A R C H	5	Desperate for Marriage	Хочу замуж	Director: Sonya Karpunina; Cast: Milos Bikovic, Kristina Asmus, Sergey Gilyov, Marina Aleksandrova, Yuliya Aug, Oleg Komarov, Anastasiya Ukolova	Central Partnership / Peak Media / START Studio
M A R C H	24	Finnick	Финник	Director: Denis Chernov; Voice cast: Mikhail Khrustalyov, Veronika Golubeva, Ida Galich, Boris Dergachev, Andrey Lyovin, Danya Milokhin	Central Partnership / Riki Group

Opening		Title	Russian title	Cast and crew	Details
A P R I L	7	Dolphin Boy	Мальчик-дельфин	Director: Andrey Gogolev, Mohammad KheirAndish; Voice cast: Polina Avdeenko	Central Partnership / SkyFrame
A P R I L	7	Bodybuilder	Бодибилдер	Director: Andrey Grachyov; Cast: Denis Semenikhin, Mikhail Gorevoy	
A P R I L	14	Layer	Пласт	Director: Stanislav Sapachyov; Cast: Vladimir Vdovichenkov, Kirill Käro, Viktoriya Bogatyryova	"Planeta Inform" Film Distribution
A P R I L	14	Reversible reality	Обратимая реальность	Director: Dmitry Konstantinov; Cast: Pavel Chinarev, Vera Kolesnikova, Anton Filipenko, Timofey Tribuntsev	Central Partnership / Old School Productions / CineLab Production
A P R I L	14	The Riot	Подельники	Director: Yevgeny Grigorev; Cast: Yaroslav Mogilnikov, Yuri Borisov, Elizaveta Yankovskaya, Pavel Derevyanko, Konstantin Balakirev	Central Partnership / "Pervoe Kino" Film Company / START Studio
A P R I L	14	Parents of the Strict Regime	Родители строгого режима	Director: Nikita Vladimirov; Cast: Yevgeny Tkachuk, Alisa Freyndlikh, Aleksandr Adabashyan, Olga Medynich, Igor Khripunov, Vladimir Sychyov	"Art for People" Film Company
A P R I L	21	First Oscar	Первый Оскар	Director: Sergey Mokritskiy; Cast: Tikhon Zhiznevsky, Anton Momot, Darya Zhovner, Andrey Merzlikin, Nikita Tarasov, Vasiliy Mishchenko, Stanislav Strelkov	Central Partnership / "New People" Film Company; The war tells the story of receiving the first Soviet Oscar for the documentary Rout of the German troops near Moscow (1942).
A P R I L	21	Return From the Front	Возвращение с фронта	Director: Nikolay Gadomsky; Cast: Lyubov Gamova	
A P R I L	21	No Looking Back	Оторви и выбрось	Director: Kirill Sokolov; Cast: Sofya Krugova, Viktoriya Korotkova, Anna Mikhalkova, Aleksandr Yatsenko	
A P R I L	28	1941. Wings Over Berlin	1941. Крылья над Берлином	Director: Konstantin Buslov; Cast: Maksim Bityukov, Sergei Puskepalis, Gela Meskhi, Andrei Kharenko, Sergey Gilyov, Yevgeny Antropov, Vladimir Tyaptushkin, Stepan Belozerov	"KaroRental" Film Distribution / R.B. Productions
A P R I L	28	Summer Time: Travel Back	Артек. Большое путешествие	Director: Karen Zaharov; Cast: Daniil Bolshov, Aleksey Onezhen, Elizaveta Anokhina, Daniil Muravyov-Izotov, Mikhail Galustyan	A comedy film, a trip to a children's camp in Artek.
A P R I L	28	My Sweet Monster	Бука. Мое любимое чудище	Director: Viktor Glukhushin; Voice cast: Lyubov Aksyonova, Aleksej Chumakov, Aliona Doletskaya, Timur Rodriguez	An animated feature film. Official website at the Luminescence Kft
A P R I L	28	Desperate Shareholders	Отчаянные дольщики	Director: Ilya Farfell; Cast: Maksim Lagashkin, Mikhail Trukhin, Ekaterina Stulova, Nikita Kologrivyy, Olga Venikova	Central Partnership / Yellow, Black and White
M A Y	1	The Alpine Campaign	Суворов. Великое путешествие	Director: Boris Chertkov; Voice cast: Anton Makarsky, Nataliya Bystrova, Philipp Kirkorov	Central Partnership / Soyuzmultfilm
M A Y	5	Sashka. A Soldier's Diary	Сашка. Дневник солдата	Cast & Director: Kirill Zaytsev; Cast: Ivan Klochko, Ivan Krivoruchko, Marat Efendiev, Igor Nazarenko	Short war film
M A Y	12	Breathe Easy	Дышите свободно	Director: Sergei Bodrov; Cast: Yevgeny Tkachuk, Polina Agureeva, Polina Pushkaruk	
M A Y	18	Tchaikovsky's Wife	Жена Чайковского	Director: Kirill Serebrennikov; Cast: Alyona Mikhaylova, Odin Biron, Yuliya Aug, Miron Fydorov	Biographical Drama released at the 2022 Cannes Film Festival
M A Y	19	Nika	Ника	Director: Vasilisa Kuzmina; Cast: Elizaveta Yankovskaya, Anna Mikhalkova, Ivan Fominov, Ivan Brovin	Central Partnership / National Media Group / Vodorod Film Company / Art Pictures Studio
M A Y	26	Amanat	Аманат	Director: Anton Sivers, Rauf Kubaev; Cast: Arslan Murzabekov, Amin Khuratov, Varvara Komarova, Andrey Sokolov, Yekaterina Guseva, Alexander Michkov, Daniil Strakhov	"KaroRental" Film Distribution / Dagger Film; A passionate love story against the backdrop of dramatic events in the military history of the Russian Empire in the first half of the 19th century, after the Siege of Akhoulgo, the main conflict of the Caucasian War of 1817-1864.
M A Y	26	My Father Is a Chieftain	Мой папа — вождь	Director: Egor Konchalovsky; Cast: Dmitry Nagiyev, Egor Tishkanin, Maria Mironova, Fyodor Dobronravov	
J U N E	2	Infiltration	Своя война	Cast & Director: Aleksey Chadov; Cast: Kristina Asmus, Viktor Sukhorukov, Artyom Tkachenko, Vitali Kishchenko, Dzhalil Asretov, Evgeniya Lezgintseva, Yuliya Kubina, Aleksey Rodionov	CTB Film Company / Film company "22"
J U N E	9	Koschey. The Bride Kidnapper	Кощей. Похититель невест	Director: Roman Artemyev; Voice cast: Viktor Dobronravov, Elizaveta Boyarskaya, Roman Artemyev, Irina Savina, Ekaterina Tarasova	An animated feature film. KinoAtis / CTB Film Company
J U N E	9	The One	Одна	Director: Dmitry Suvorov; Cast: Nadezhda Kaleganova, Maksim Ivanov, Viktor Dobronravov, Yan Tsapnik, Anna Dubrovskaya	A disaster film based on real events that took place in 1981, when rescuers discovered a twenty-year-old student who survived a fall from a height of 5 kilometers.
J U N E	9	Young Man	Молодой человек	Director: Alexandr Fomin; Cast: Pavel Tabakov, Danila Kozlovsky, Danila Poperechny, Ingrid Olerinskaya, Valentina Lyapina	"KaroRental" Film Distribution / Versus Pictures / ID Production / Gorky Film Studios
J U N E	16	Bull Terrier	Бультерьер	Director: Vasily Bystrov; Cast: Vladimir Mineev, Anastasiya Krasovskaya, Lev Semashkov, Vitali Kishchenko	VLG.FILM / Russian Hollywood / All Media Company

Opening		Title	Russian title	Cast and crew	Details
J U L Y		Rolls	Булки	Director: Oleg Asadulin; Cast: Kristina Asmus, Arseny Robak, Mark Bogatyryov, Boris Dergachev, Yuliya Topolnitskaya	"KaroRental" Film Distribution / Megogo Studios / Wow Oscar Studio
J U L Y		The Land of Sasha	Страна Саша	Director: Yuliya Trofimova; Cast: Mark Eidelstein, Maria Matsel, Evgenia Gromova, Dmitry Endaltsev	Central Partnership / Vega Film
J U L Y	28	Asphalt Sun	Асфальтовое солнце	Director: Ilya Khotinenko; Cast: Artyom Fadeev, Polina Agureeva, Oleg Yagodin, David Melkonyan	Central Partnership / Vita Active
J U L Y	28	Nakhimov Residents	Нахимовцы	Director: Oleg Shtrom; Cast: Daniil Khodunov, Nikita Khodunov, Vasilisa Shakunova, Andrey Merzlikin	"KaroRental" Film Distribution / KARO-Production
A U G U S T	18	Night Mode	Ночной режим. Фильм	Director: Andrey Libenson; Cast: Andrey Merzlikin, Pavel Tabakov, Ekaterina Shumakova	"KaroRental" Film Distribution / MTS Media
A U G U S T	25	Lena and Justice	Лена и справедливость	Director: Ekaterina Veshcheva; Cast: Anna Ukolova, Parviz Pulodi, Yuliya Bedareva	"KaroRental" Film Distribution / SASH Movie
S E P T E M B E R	15	Non-Orphanage	Недетский дом	Director: Mikhail Raskhodnikov; Cast: Ivan Okhlobystin, Alexandr Panin, Polina Vataga, Irina Rozanova	
S E P T E M B E R	15	Tiber	Тибра	Director: Anna Goroyan; Cast: Anna Peresild, Viktoriya Isakova, Artyom Bystrov	Central Partnership
S E P T E M B E R	15	Who's There?	Кто там?	Director: Vladimir Maslov; Cast: Vladimir Mashkov, Aleksandra Bortich, Kirill Käro, Tikhon Zhiznevsky	Central Partnership / Dudka Films / Neopoleon Studio / Zoom Production
S E P T E M B E R	22	Little Red Riding Hood	Красная Шапочка	Director: Lina Arifulina, Aleksandr Barshak, Artyom Aksenenko; Cast: Taisya Kalinina, Danila Yakushev, Ekaterina Klimova, Irina Rozanova	Central Partnership / Three A Film Company / Entire Promo Lab
S E P T E M B E R	22	Distant Close	Далёкие близкие	Director: Ivan Sosnin; Cast: Yevgeny Sytyy, Filipp Avdeyev, Ekaterina Ageyeva	Central Partnership / KIT Film Studio

Opening		Title	Russian title	Cast and crew	Details
O C T O B E R	6	Land of Legends	Сердце Пармы	Director: Anton Megerdichev; Cast: Aleksandr Kuznetsov, Yevgeny Mironov, Fyodor Bondarchuk, Elena Erbakova, Sergei Puskepalis, Aleksey Rozin	Central Partnership; Based on the historical novel The Heart of Parma by the writer Alexei Ivanov.
O C T O B E R	13	A Fairy Tale for the Old	Сказка для старых	Cast & Director: Fyodor Lavrov, Roman Mikhailov; Cast: Kirill Polukhin, Yevgeny Tkachuk	VLG.FILM / Fruit Time
O C T O B E R	13	Love Story	Лавстори	Director: Pyotr Todorovsky; Cast: Alexander Petrov, Vilma Kutavičiūtė, Andrey Smirnov, Mikhail Troynik	Nashe Kino (transl. "Our Cinema") / Sky Entertainment
O C T O B E R	20	No Crying	Плакать нельзя	Director: Natalia Nazarova; Cast: Svetlana Chuykina, Vladimir Levchenko, Ivan Yankovsky, Jonathan Solway	
O C T O B E R	27	Raiders of the Lost Library	Либерея: Охотники за сокровищами	Director: Gleb Orlov; Cast: Tikhon Zhiznevsky, Aleksei Serebryakov, Diana Pozharskaya, Artyom Tkachenko	Central Partnership
O C T O B E R	27	Petrópolis	Петрополис	Director: Valery Fokin; Cast: Anton Shagin, Yuliya Snigir, Vladimir Koshevoy, Odin Biron, Junsuke Kinoshita, Richard Lee Wilson	The White Nights film distribution company / Interfest / Revolution Film; Based on Fire by Kirill Fokin
O C T O B E R	27	Summer Ends Soon	Скоро кончится лето	Director: Yana Skopina; Cast: Alikhan Abildin, Olga Obumova, Ramazan Akhmedov	Kazakhstan and Russian film "Pioneer" Film Distribution / Ministry of Culture of the Russian Federation / Kinokult Producer's Center / Uvent Production
O C T O B E R	27	Terrible Dad	Грозный папа	Director: Karen Oganesyan; Cast: Yevgeni Grishkovetz, Kirill Käro, Ulyana Pilipenko, Erik Panich, Irina Voronova	
N O V E M B E R	3	Peter I: The Last Tsar and the First Emperor	Пётр I: Последний царь и первый император	Director: Andrei Kravchuk; Cast: Ivan Kolesnikov	Central Partnership
N O V E M B E R	10	Like a Man	По-мужски	Director: Maksim Kulagin; Cast: Anton Lapenko, Ekaterina Shcherbakova	Central Partnership
N O V E M B E R	10	Zemun	Земун	Director: Eduard Zholnin; Cast: Yevgeny Tkachuk, Ivan Rashetnyak, Oleg Yagodin, Ekaterina Shumakova	
N O V E M B E R	24	Winter Season	Время года зима	Director: Svetlana Ustinova; Cast: Yuliya Snigir, Yevgenia Dobrovolskaya	Capella Film
D E C E M B E R	1	To the Touch	На ощупь	Director: Anton Muss; Cast: Dmitry Nagiyev, Vladislav Tsenyov, Mikhail Gorevoy, Mikhail Evlanov, Darya Voynovskaya	Central Partnership / K.B.A.
D E C E M B E R	1	The Whirlpool	Омут	Director: Denis Kryuchkov; Cast: Alyona Mitroshina, Wolfgang Cerny, Vyacheslav Chepurchenko	
D E C E M B E R	8	The Nutcracker and the Magic Flute	Щелкунчик и волшебная флейта	Director: Georgi Gitis, Viktor Glukhushin; Voice cast: Fedor Fedotov, Lyubov Aksyonova, Pyotr Ivashchenko, Aleksandr Gudkov, Elena Shulman	An animated feature film. Movie Atmosphere / CTB Film Company / Luminescence Kft
D E C E M B E R	8	Secret Santa	Тайный Санта	Director: Alexandr Babaev; Cast: Roman Kurtsyn, Zoya Berber, Boris Dergachev	Nashe Kino (transl. "Our Cinema")
D E C E M B E R	8	Shadow	Тень: Взять Гордея	Director: Ilya Kulikov, Anya Mirokhina; Cast: Oleg Gaas, Ekaterina Sharykina, Denis Pyanov, Tatiana Babenkova, Filipp Yankovsky	"KaroRental" Film Distribution / Legio Felix
D E C E M B E R	15	Masha and the Bear: 12 Months	Маша и Медведь: 12 месяцев	Director: Vasiliy Bedoshvili; Voice cast: Yuliya Zunikova, Boris Kutnevich	"Volga" Film Distribution; Short films based on the 2009 animated television series Masha and the Bear.
D E C E M B E R	22	The Adventures of Chuck and Huck	Чук и Гек. Большое приключение	Director: Alexander Kott; Cast: Andrey Andreev, Yury Stepanov, Vladimir Vdovichenkov, Yuliya Snigir, Aleksandr Samoylenko, Timofey Tribuntsev	VLG.FILM / Metronome Movie; Based on the novel Chuk and Gek (English: Chuck and Huck) by Arkady Gaidar.
D E C E M B E R	22	Mira	Мира	Director: Dmitry Kiselyov; Cast: Veronika Ustimova, Anatoliy Beliy, Alexander Petrov, Yevgeny Yegorov, Darya Moroz, Maksim Lagashkin, Kirill Zaytsev	"Cinema Atmosphere" Film Distribution / AMedia / Mars Media Entertainment

=== Culturally Russian films ===
- About Fate is a 2022 American romantic film directed by Maryus Vaysberg.
- Fairytale is a 2022 experimental animated fantasy film.
- Kompromat is a 2022 French drama film directed by Jérôme Salle.
- Woman at Sea is a 2022 French drama film directed by Dinara Drukarova.

== See also ==
- 2022 in film
