= Like a Man =

Like a Man may refer to:

- "Like a Man" (Onhel song), 2017
- "Like a Man" (Dallas Smith song), 2020
- Like a Man (film), a Russian film from 2022
