= The Petty Demon (film) =

- Russian: Мелкий бес
- Directed by: Nikolay Dostal
- Written by: Fyodor Sologub (novel); Georgiy Nikolaev
- Produced by: Mikhail Gluzman; Nikolai Stambula
- Starring: Sergey Taramaev; Irina Rozanova; Polina Kutepova; Aleksey Elistratov; Sergey Batalov
- Cinematography: Valeriy Shuvalov
- Edited by: Mariya Sergeyeva
- Music by: Aleksandr Belyayev; Nikolay Karetnikov
- Production company: Mosfilm
- Release date: January 1995
- Running time: 107 min.
- Country: Russia
- Language: Russian

The Petty Demon (Russian: Мелкий бес, romanized: Melkiy bes) is a 1995 Russian mystery drama film directed by Nikolay Dostal.

== Plot ==
The film takes place in a small provincial town, populated by boring and stupid people. Gymnasium teacher Ardalyon Borisovich Peredonov dreams of moving to the capital, his second cousin Varvara wants to marry him and begins to write him letters of invitation to St. Petersburg on behalf of the Princess.

== Cast ==
- Sergey Taramaev as Peredonov
- Irina Rozanova as Varvara
- Polina Kutepova as Lyudmila
- Aleksey Elistratov as Pylnikov
- Sergey Batalov as Volodin
- Aleksey Mironov as Khripach, director of the gymnasium
- Gennady Nazarov as Rutilov
- Agrippina Steklova as Daria
- Kseniya Kutepova as Valeriya
- Elena Mayorova as Vershina
- Tatyana Kravchenko as Yershikha
- Roman Madyanov as Tcherepnin
- Aleksei Kravchenko as gymnastics teacher
- Galina Stakhanova as Kokovkina
