= Catherine the Great (2015 TV series) =

- Екатерина Bеликая
- Genre: History; Serial drama
- Created by: Igor Zaitsev
- Starring: Yuliya Snigir (Season 1); Elizaveta Boyarskaya (Season 2); Natalia Surkova; Pavel Derevyanko; Sergey Shakurov; Ilya Noskov; Pavel Trubiner
- Country of origin: Russia
- Original language: Russian
- No. of seasons: 2
- No. of episodes: 24

Production
- Executive producer: Ruben Dishdishyan
- Production locations: Saint Petersburg and Leningrad Oblast
- Editor: Goran Pavichevich
- Running time: 50 Minutes per episode
- Production company: Mars Media

Original release
- Network: 1TV
- Release: 4 November 2015 – 2023

Catherine The Great (Russian: Великая, romanized: Velikaya) is a 2015 Russian television series starring Yuliya Snigir as Catherine the Great. It was released in November 2015 on Channel One Russia.

== Plot ==
The history of Catherine the Great from the moment she arrived in Russia as the new bride of Peter III and her ascent to the Russian throne.

Nearly 20 years of palace intrigues, conspiracies, the struggle for power and personal dramas.

== Cast ==
- Yuliya Snigir as Empress Catherine the Great (Season 1)
  - Christina Kucherenko as Young Princess Sophie
- Elizaveta Boyarskaya as Empress Catherine the Great (Season 2)
  - Masha Polienko as Princess Sophie as a child
- Natalia Surkova as Empress Yelizabeta Petrovna
- Pavel Derevyanko as Pyotr III Fyodorovich
  - Ilya Savichev as Young Prince Peter
  - Ivan Shmakov as Prince Peter as a child
- Sergey Shakurov as Count Alexey Bestuzhev-Ryumin
- Ilya Noskov as Count Sergei Saltykov
- Pavel Trubiner as Grigory Orlov
- Mark Bogatyrev as Vasily Zalessky
- Roman Madyanov as Alexander Shuvalov
- Semyon Strugachyov as Lestocq
- Olga Medynich as Vorontsova
- Dmitry Ulyanov as Grigory Potemkin
- Victor Terelya as Peter Shuvalov
- Richard Lepers as Stanislaw Poniatowski
- Vladimir Matveev as Apraxin
- Svetlana Frolova as Ekaterina Dashkova
- Ivan Batarev as Alexey Orlov
- Bastian Sierich as Frederick the Great

== Production ==
=== Filming ===
Filming was completed from December 2013 to August 2014 in Saint Petersburg and Leningrad Oblast (including Peter and Paul Fortress, Constantine Palace, Gatchina, and Lenfilm Studios).

The crew is working on scenarios of the second and third season. They will tell the life of the Empress from 1762 to 1775 and from 1775 to 1796, respectively. The second season was expected to finish filming in 2016.

Information on the show during the making of the 2nd and 3rd seasons can be seen on the wayback machine.

Both the Second and Third seasons have been released. Season 2 involves Ekaterina, her sons, her relationship with the eldest Orlov brother, and Count Panin. Season 3 expands on some of second seasons’s storylines, while focusing on two of history’s better-known Pretenders who claimed the Russian throne rightfully belonged to them.

== See also ==
- Ekaterina, Russia-1's 2014 version
