= Evgeniy Tkachuk =

Russian actor, film director, screenwriter, producer

- Евгений Ткачук
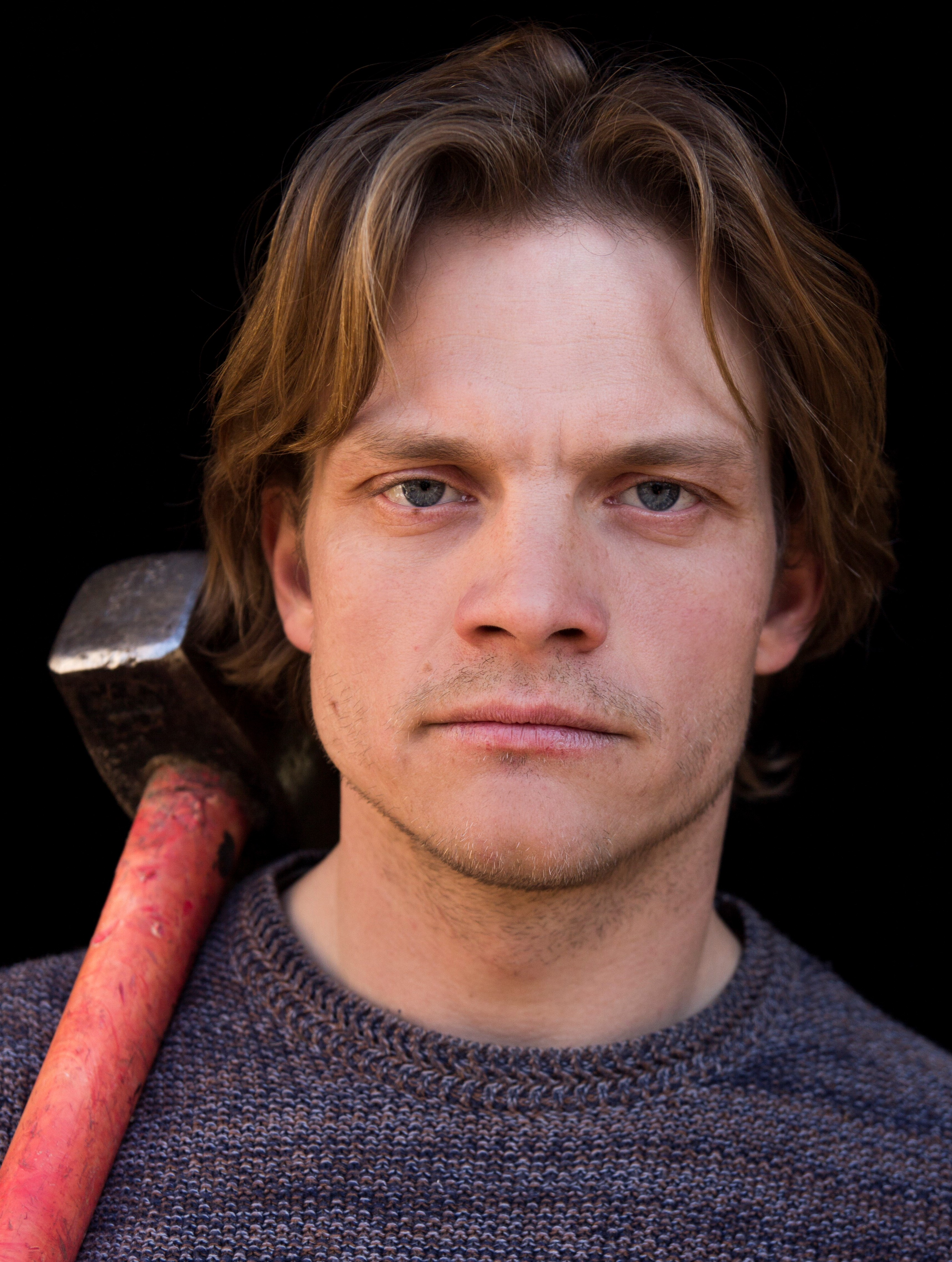
- Evgeny Tkachuk, founder of Horse and Drama Theatre VelesO
- Born: Evgeniy Valeryevich Tkachuk; May 23, 1984; Ashgabat, TuSSR, USSR (now Turkmenistan)
- Citizenship: Russian
- Occupations: Actor; film director; screenwriter; producer; singer
- Years active: 1995–present
- Awards: Golden Eagle Award (2024)

Evgeniy Valeryevich Tkachuk (Russian: Евгений Валерьевич Ткачук, also spelled Evgeny or Yevgeny; born July 23, 1984) is a Russian stage and film actor, film director, screenwriter, producer, and singer. He is the founder and artistic director of the private equestrian drama theatre VelesO in Leningrad Oblast, established in 2016.

== Early life and education ==
Evgeniy or (also spelled Evgeny or Yevgeny) Valeryevich Tkachuk was born on July 23, 1984, in Ashgabat, Turkmen SSR, Soviet Union. His father, Valery Tkachuk, was an actor and director at the Syzran Drama Theatre. In 1994, when Evgeniy was 10 years old, his family moved to Syzran, Samara Oblast, where he worked at the local drama theatre while attending school.

In 2002, he entered the Russian Academy of Theatre Arts (GITIS), studying acting under Oleg Kudryashov. In 2007 he received the Mikhail Tsaryov Prize from the Union of Theatre Workers of Russia for professional achievement.

== Career ==
Tkachuk worked at the Moscow Theatre for Young Audiences and the State Theatre of Nations.

He made his film debut in 2007 in Alexandra directed by Alexander Sokurov. His breakthrough came in 2011 with the title role in the television series The Life and Adventures of Mishka Yaponchik.

In 2013 he won the Special Jury Prize for Best Actor at the Window to Europe Film Festival for Winter Journey. Film critic Andrei Plakhov called the performance a "major discovery".

In 2015 he starred as Grigory Melekhov in the television adaptation of And Quiet Flows the Don, directed by Sergei Ursulyak.

=== VelesO Theatre ===
In December 2016 Tkachuk founded the equestrian drama theatre VelesO in Lepsari village, Leningrad Oblast, combining dramatic performance with live horses.

The theatre's production Sacred Flight of Flowers premiered in 2019 and later received a special jury prize from the St. Petersburg theatre award Breakthrough.

== Legal issues ==
On 15 September 2024 Tkachuk was detained at Pulkovo Airport, Saint Petersburg, after hashish was found in his luggage. On 3 December 2024, the Moskovsky District Court of Saint Petersburg sentenced him to 5 years and 6 months suspended imprisonment with a three-year probation period and a fine of 100,000 rubles.

== Awards and nominations ==
- 2013: Nominated, Nika Award, for Winter Journey
- 2018: Winner, Golden Unicorn Award for Best Actor, for How Vitka Chesnok Drove Lyokha Shtyr to the House for Disabled
- 2024: Winner, Golden Eagle Award for Best Supporting Actor, for Pravednik (The Righteous)

== Personal life ==
Tkachuk has three daughters from two marriages.

== Selected filmography ==
- Moscow Saga (2004–2014)
- Alexandra (2007)
- I Am (2009)
- The Edge (2010)
- The Alien Girl (2010)
- The Life and Adventures of Mishka Yaponchik (2011)
- Winter Journey (2013)
- Gagarin: First in Space (2013)
- Demons (2014)
- And Quiet Flows the Don (2015)
- How Vitka Chesnok Drove Lyokha Shtyr to the House for Disabled (2017)
- The Bottomless Bag (2017)
- The Road to Calvary (2017)
- A Rough Draft (2018)
- Godunov (2018–2019)
- Van Goghs (2018)
- A Rough Draft (2018)
- A Frenchman (2019)
- Dead Mountain (2020)
- Peace! Love! Chewing Gum! (2020–2023)
- Zemun (2021)
- Execution (2021)
- Parents of the Strict Regime (2022)
- Breathe Easy (2022)
- A Fairy Tale for the Old (2022)
- Intensive Care (2022)
- Pravednik (The Righteous; 2023)
- Lord of the Wind (2023)
- Rabies (2023)
- Khroniki russkoy revolyutsii (2025)
- Litvyak (2026)
