= Sanding Dreams =

- Directed by: Anton Mamykin
- Written by: Anton Mamykin
- Produced by: Tatyana Sharkova; Andrey Shipigin; Ivan Yakovenko
- Starring: Mark Eydelshteyn; Nikita Konkin; Darya Ekamasova; Tikhon Kotrelyov; Artur Kaspranov; Sofya Vorontsova; Sergey Zanin
- Cinematography: Vladimir Borisov
- Edited by: Elizaveta Krikunova
- Music by: Gennady Medvedev
- Production company: Bosfor Pictures
- Distributed by: VLG.FILM
- Release dates: 2025 (Bosphorus Film Festival); April 2, 2026 (Russia)
- Running time: 92 minutes
- Country: Russia
- Language: Russian
- Box office: ₽13 million

Sanding Dreams (Russian: Космос засыпает) is a 2025 Russian drama film directed by Anton Mamykin. It stars Mark Eydelshteyn, Nikita Konkin, and Darya Ekamasova.

The film's world premiere took place in 2025 at the Bosphorus Film Festival. This film was theatrically released on April 2, 2026.

== Plot ==
The film tells the story of a talented student at a prestigious university who dreams of going into space. Suddenly, he receives sad news from home and decides to go to help his mother and brother in a settlement where houses are literally drowning in the sand...

== Cast ==
- Mark Eydelshteyn as Pasha
- Nikita Konkin as Ilyusha, Pasha's younger brother
- Darya Ekamasova as Pasha's mother
- Tikhon Kotrelyov as Pasha's father
- Artur Kaspranov as Vitya
- Sofya Vorontsova as Jana
- Sergey Zanin as Kolya

== Production ==
=== Filming ===
Filming took place in the settlement of Shoyna, located on the shores of the White Sea in the Nenets Autonomous Okrug.
