= Alexey M. Reznikovich =

Businessman and Investor based in UK

- Born: April 1968 (age 58)
- Citizenship: British, Maltese
- Education: Moscow State University; Georgetown University/INSEAD
- Occupation: Businessman

Alexey Mikhaylovitch Reznikovich (born April 1968) is a UK-based businessman and investor, managing partner of the venture capital firm Chesterfield, former chairman of Veon, and active in the private equity sector.

== Early life ==
Reznikovich was born in April 1968. He lived in Kiev, Ukraine and Moscow, Russia. After a two-year military service, he earned a bachelor's degree in economics from Moscow State University, and an MBA from Georgetown University and INSEAD.

== Career ==
In his early career, Reznikovich worked for Procter & Gamble in Italy, and Transworld in the US. From 1993 to 2000, Reznikovich worked at McKinsey & Company, in Milan, Paris, New York and Moscow, becoming a partner in 1998. In 2000, he co-founded an Internet cafe business Cafemax. Later, he was involved in merchant banking activities in the consumer goods, retail and telecom sectors.

Reznikovich was a director of PJSC VimpelCom from 2002 to 2010, and a member of the supervisory board of Veon (formerly VimpelCom Ltd) from 2010 to 2017, and the chairman from 2012 to 2017.

Reznikovich was the chief executive officer (CEO) of Altimo LLC from 2005 to 2014, and managing partner of LetterOne Technology, a private equity firm, from 2014 to 2017.

In 2016, he founded a venture capital firm, Chesterfield, investing in telecom industry projects and high-tech companies worldwide.

== Philanthropy and other activities ==
In 2016, Reznikovich established a charitable foundation CASE supporting initiatives in culture, arts, sports, education.

In 2017, he produced a feature film Cold Tango by an Oscar-nominated director Pavel Chukhray.

Reznikovich has been a professional fencer earning the title of the fencing champion of Ukraine.
