= Roman Mikhaylov =

Russian mathematician, writer, and film director

Roman Valeryevich Mikhailov
- Роман Валерьевич Михайлов
- Born: October 2, 1978 (age 48); Riga, Latvian SSR, Soviet Union
- Education: Moscow State University
- Occupations: Mathematician; Writer; Film director; Theatre director; Screenwriter
- Years active: 1996–present
- Employer: Steklov Mathematical Institute (former)
- Known for: Homotopy patterns in group theory; experimental prose; independent cinema
- Awards: Andrei Bely Prize (2021); Moscow Mathematical Society Prize (2006); RAS Medal for Young Scientists (2005); Von Neumann Fellowship (IAS, 2011)

Roman Valeryevich Mikhailov (Russian: Роман Валерьевич Михайлов; born 2 October 1978) is a Russian mathematician, writer, and film and theatre director. He holds a Doctor of Sciences degree in physics and mathematics and is a professor of the Russian Academy of Sciences. Mikhailov is the author of more than 60 scientific publications and a monograph in algebra and topology, and is also a novelist and independent filmmaker.

He is a specialist in homological algebra, homotopy theory, and group theory. He was an invited speaker at the 7th European Congress of Mathematics (2016) and at the International Congress of Mathematicians (2022). In 2021, he received the Andrei Bely Prize for prose.

== Education ==
Mikhailov graduated from the Faculty of Mechanics and Mathematics of Moscow State University in 2001. He defended his PhD dissertation, Filtrations of groups, homology and spaces of links, at the Steklov Mathematical Institute of the Russian Academy of Sciences, under the supervision of Eugene Shchepin. In 2010 he received the Doctor of Sciences degree with a dissertation entitled Homotopy Theory of Normal Series in Groups. He later worked at the Steklov Institute and held research positions at Saint Petersburg State University, the Institute for Advanced Study (Princeton), and the University of Latvia.

== Scientific work ==
Mikhailov's research interests include homological and homotopical algebra, algebraic K-theory, group theory, group rings, and category theory. He solved or substantially advanced several long-standing problems in algebra, including problems posed by Aldridge Bousfield, Gilbert Baumslag, Levine, and Plotkin.

Together with Laurent Bartholdi, Mikhailov solved the dimension subgroup problem, open for more than 80 years, showing that arbitrary finite abelian groups may occur as subgroups of dimension quotients. Their proof relies on homotopy groups of spheres. The work was recognized by the London Mathematical Society as one of the best papers published in 2020–2023.

Mikhailov introduced several concepts in group theory and homotopy theory, including homotopy patterns, pattern inflations, FR-languages, transfinite parafreeness, and metabelian telescopes. At the ICM 2022 he presented a research program applying homotopy patterns to problems in group rings.

In 2022, Mikhailov announced his withdrawal from active academic research.

== Literature ==
Mikhailov is the author of several experimental novels and short-story collections, including Ravinagar (2016), The Beautiful Night of All People (2017), Berries (2020), and Wait for Summer and See What Happens (2021). His prose has been praised by writer Mikhail Elizarov and philosopher Yoel Regev.

In 2021, he received the Andrei Bely Prize for his novel Wait for Summer and See What Happens.

== Film ==
Mikhailov made his directorial film debut with A Fairy Tale for the Old (2022), co-directed with actor Fyodor Lavrov; the film won the main prize at the Spirit of Fire Film Festival.

His subsequent films include Snow, Sister, and Wolverine (2023), Heritage (2023), October Vacation (2023), Let’s Go to Macau (2023), We Need to Make Films about Love (2024), and Firebird (2024).

In 2024 he completed his first multi-episode project, Journey to the Sun and Back, based on his novel Wait for Summer and See What Happens.

== Public stance ==
Since December 2020, Mikhailov has been listed in the database of the Ukrainian website Myrotvorets due to his visit to the self-proclaimed Donetsk and Luhansk People's Republics in 2016.

== Selected awards ==
=== Science ===
- Prize and Medal of the Russian Academy of Sciences for Young Scientists (2005)
- Moscow Mathematical Society Prize (2006)
- Von Neumann Fellowship, Institute for Advanced Study (2011)

=== Literature ===
- Andrei Bely Prize for Prose (2021)

=== Film ===
- Spirit of Fire Film Festival – Grand Prize (2022)
- Gorky Fest – Grand Prize (2023)

== Filmography ==
- We Need to Make Films about Love (2024)
- Firebird (2024)
- Snow, Sister, and Wolverine (2023)
- Heritage (2023)
- October Vacation (2023)
- Let’s Go to Macau (2023)
- A Fairy Tale for the Old (2022)
