= We Need to Make Films about Love =

- Directed by: Roman Mikhaylov
- Written by: Roman Mikhaylov
- Produced by: Yuliya Vityazeva; Katerina Mikhaylova; Alla Pavlova
- Starring: Mark Eydelshteyn; Darya Bryukhanova; Roman Mikhaylov
- Cinematography: Elena Metla; Aleksei Rodionov
- Edited by: Pavel Dodonov
- Music by: Pavel Dodonov
- Production companies: FT Production; Vega Film; Respect India Entertainment Pvt. Ltd.
- Distributed by: "K24" Film Distribution
- Release dates: April 25, 2024 (Moscow Film Festival); August 14, 2025 (Russia)
- Running time: 73 minutes
- Countries: Russia; India
- Language: Russian

We Need to Make Films about Love (Russian: Надо снимать фильмы о любви, romanized: Nado snimat filmy o lyubvi) is a 2024 Russian independent drama film written and directed by and starring Roman Mikhaylov. It is Mikhaylov’s sixth feature-length film. Like his later 2024 film The Firebird, it follows a Russian film crew working in India.

The film premiered on 25 April 2024 at the 46th Moscow International Film Festival (MIFF).

== Plot ==
Actors Mark and Chingiz arrive in Varanasi to take part in an arthouse film shoot led by director Roman. During production, Mark begins a relationship with a Russian woman named Sveta. Tensions arise between personal relationships and the filmmaking process, leading to disappearances, stalled shooting, and conflicts between the director and his cast.

As the boundaries between life and cinema blur, Roman attempts to incorporate reality itself into the film. The final scenes emphasize love as both subject and method, culminating in the director’s assertion that “we should make movies about love.”

== Cast ==
- Mark Eydelshteyn as Mark
- Darya Bryukhanova as Sveta
- Roman Mikhaylov as Roman, director
- Alexandra Kiseleva as Sasha, actress
- Maria Matsel as Masha, actress
- Illarion Marov as Larik, actor
- Chingiz Garaev as Chingiz, actor
- Dmitry Kuznetsov (Husky) as Dima (Husky), musician
- Alina Nasibullina as assistant director

== Release ==
=== Marketing ===
A teaser was released on 17 March 2024. Mikhaylov described the film as a parable about the fragmentation of the world and its healing through love.

=== Theatrical ===
The world premiere took place in the "Russian Premieres" competition at the 46th MIFF, where seven films competed. The film received two awards at the festival.

== Awards ==
- 2024 — Moscow International Film Festival 2024: NETPAC Jury Prize (“For reflecting tenderness in the waters of the Ganges”)
- 2024 — MIFF: Prize of the Federation of Film Clubs (‘‘Russian Premieres’’ competition)

== Critical reception ==
The film received positive reviews from Russian critics.
