= Mark Eydelshteyn =

Russian actor (born 2002)

- Марк Эйдельштейн
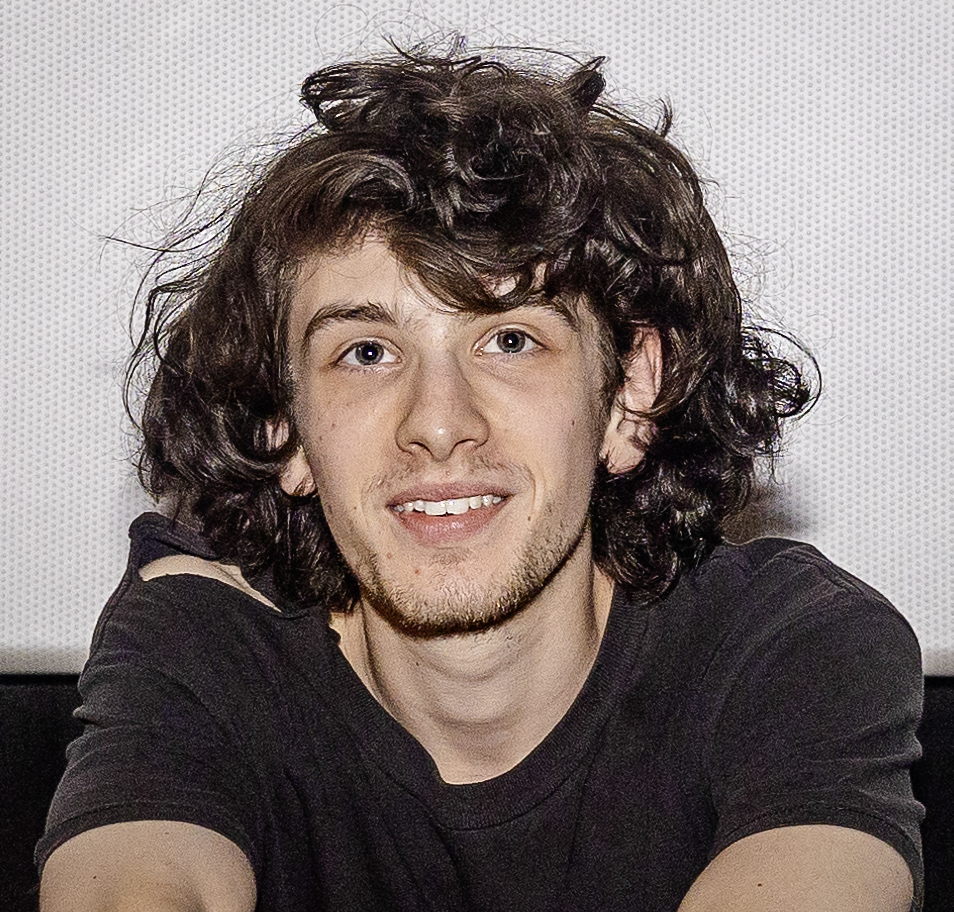
- Eydelshteyn in 2024
- Born: 18 February 2002 (age 24); Nizhny Novgorod, Russia
- Education: Moscow Art Theatre School
- Occupation: Actor
- Years active: 2021–present

Mark Aleksandrovich Eydelshteyn (Russian: Марк Александрович Эйдельштейн, also spelled as Eidelstein; born 18 February 2002) is a Russian actor. After starring in the coming-of-age film The Land of Sasha (2022), he gained international recognition with his breakthrough role in the American film Anora (2024).

== Early life and education ==
Mark Aleksandrovich Eydelshteyn was born on 18 February 2002 in Nizhny Novgorod, Russia and is of Jewish heritage. He has a younger brother, Matvey Eydelshteyn (Russian: Матвей Эйдельштейн). His mother, Olesya Valeryevna Eydelshteyn, works as a teacher of stage speech (dialect) at the Nizhny Novgorod Theatre School named after Yevgeny Yevstigneyev. The young Eydelshteyn often skipped actual school to join his mother at the theatre school. His father is Alexander Eydelshteyn, a journalist and football promoter who worked in Moscow and Chukotka, later a civil servant.

In 2018, Eydelshteyn passed the regional selection for the "Living Classics" competition for young readers and made it to the all-Russian final, held in Artek. There, Eydelshteyn met the dean of the acting department of the Russian Institute of Theatre Arts Taras Belousov, who advised him to finish school as soon as possible and enter a theatre university — which he did, upon graduating from his mother's school in 2019, entering the Moscow Art Theatre School-Studio. He graduated in 2023.

== Career ==
He gained fame after playing the leading role in the drama The Land of Sasha, which made its worldwide premiere in February 2022 at the 72nd Berlin International Film Festival. He has been dubbed by journalists as the "Russian Timothée Chalamet". He is best known for starring in the Palme d'Or and Academy Awards winning American film Anora (2024) by Sean Baker. In December 2024, Eydelshteyn was cast in the second season of the Amazon Prime Video American spy television series Mr. & Mrs. Smith.

In March 2025, Eydelshteyn signed with American agency William Morris Endeavor.

== Filmography ==
†	Denotes works that have not yet been released

=== Film ===
Year	Title	Role	Notes	Ref.
2021	First Snow	Pavel 'Pasha'		
2021	Sixteen +	Phil		
2022	The Land of Sasha	Sasha		
2023	Pravednik	Moshe Tal		
2024	One Hundred Years Ahead	Nikolai 'Kolya' Gerasimov		
2024	We Need to Make Films about Love	Mark		
2024	Anora	Ivan 'Vanya' Zakharov	American film	
2026	Sanding Dreams	Pasha		
2026	Buratino	Artemon the Poodle		
TBA	Buratino 2 †	Artemon the Poodle		

=== Television ===
Year	Title	Role	Notes	Ref.
2021	Crush	Mister Dukey		
2021	Sixteen +	Fil		
2022	The Gig (ru)	Senya		
2022	The Monastery	Yura	TV Series	
2024	Clean (ru)	Veniamin	TV Series	
2024	Display Copy	Young Grigori Perelman		
2024	Pharma (ru)	Anton		
TBA	Mr. & Mrs. Smith †	Mr. Smith	American series; season 2	
