= Guys from Mars =

- Directed by: Sergey Osipyan
- Written by: Aleksandr Lungin; Sergei Osipyan
- Produced by: Yevgeny Gindilis
- Cinematography: Marat Adelshin
- Music by: Maxim Golovin
- Production company: Tvindie Film Production
- Distributed by: Paradise
- Release date: May 5, 2011
- Running time: 105 minutes
- Country: Russia
- Language: Russian

Guys from Mars (Russian: Парень с Марса, romanized: Paren s Marsa) is a 2011 Russian romantic comedy film directed by Sergey Osipyan.

The film was released in Russia on Мay 5, 2011. The film was part of the main festival program of the MIFF.

== Plot ==
The film centers around Petya Starikov, a manager at the massive chocolate factory "Marz". After his car is stolen, he desperately seeks help from various sources, including gangsters, the traffic police, and the local precinct, but instead of assistance, he finds himself fleeced for money by everyone involved, with no real effort made to recover his vehicle. Meanwhile, Petya unexpectedly receives a promotion at work when the factory's foreign owner appoints him as the head of a new advertising project. He is tasked with creating a fresh concept for advertising chocolate bars by the end of the month.

As Petya continues his search for the stolen car, he ultimately discovers it himself, but it is in a completely wrecked condition. To make matters worse, the police wrongfully accuse him of stealing his own car. To clear his name, Petya reluctantly agrees to provide information on the gangsters he had previously consulted for help. The chaos surrounding the stolen car prevents Petya from focusing on his job, and as he grapples with mounting pressure, he finally confesses to the factory owner that the dream of creating the perfect commercial is unattainable.

== Cast ==
- Sergey Abroskin — Petya Starikov
- Kseniya Kutepova — Liza Pryalkina
- Angelina Mirimskaya — Yulia
- Artyom Tkachenko — Kolya
- Igor Chernevich — Kuzyk
- Igor Yatsko — Boombox
- Egor Barinov — Khrustalev
- Vladas Bagdonas — Phil Donahue
- Anna Arlanova — Rita
- Yevgenia Dobrovolskaya — Yulia's mother
- Oleg Danilevsky — militia assassin
- Irina Medvedeva — Masha Zaitseva
- Amadu Mamadakov — painter
- Nikita Emshanov — Gena Zver
