= The Alien Girl =

2010 Russian action film

- Film poster
- Russian: Чужая
- Directed by: Anton Bormatov
- Written by: Vladimir Nesterenko; Sergei Sokolyuk
- Produced by: Konstantin Ernst; Alexey Kucherenko; Igor Tolstunov
- Starring: Natalia Romanycheva; Evgeniy Tkachuk; Kirill Polukhin; Anatoliy Otradnov
- Cinematography: Anastasi Mikhalov
- Distributed by: 20th Century Fox
- Release date: 17 June 2010
- Running time: 100 mins
- Country: Russia
- Language: Russian

The Alien Girl (Russian: Чужая, romanized: Chuzhaya) is a 2010 Russian crime film directed by Anton Bormatov. Co-written by Vladimir Nesterenko and Sergei Sokolyuk, the film features Natalia Romanycheva in the lead role along with Evgeniy Tkachuk, Kirill Polukhin, Anatoliy Otradnov, Aleksandr Golubkov and Evgeniy Mundum. It is based on a novel of the same name, by Ukrainian author Vladimir “Adolfovich” Nesterenko.

Set in the 1990s, the film follows a group of henchmen sent by a Ukrainian mob boss to kidnap a gang member's sister hiding in the Czech Republic. Things take a turn when she is revealed to be a killer who plays her captors against each other.

The film was released in Russia on 17 June 2010. It was released in America by Fox International Productions on 17 December 2010. It received largely unfavorable reviews.

== Synopsis ==
In the 1990s Ukraine, a young mobster named Arthur is seen machine-gunning a car with four men, then finishing them off with headshots. His gun jams, so the last victim survives and is able to identify him. Arthur is arrested and tortured by the police. Afraid that he might flip, the mob boss Rasp sends a group of henchmen to kidnap his sister Angela (nicknamed "Alien"), possibly to use her as a hostage. Alien is known to reside in a brothel in Czechia. The group consists of four men known only by aliases: Kid, Quicky, Dumbbell and Snot. They travel across the border in a car. A retired criminal nicknamed Carp who lives in Czechia provides them with weapons and ammo.

The group starts their quest by kidnapping a random hooker and torturing her to learn the whereabouts of the brothel, manned by two hapless junkie pimps. They storm the brothel and torture the pimps, only to find out that Alien has been sold to another brothel, much bigger and better guarded. They approach that brothel on the pretense of buying the girl back. Alien is brought before them, beaten and drugged, but nevertheless defiant. A shootout ensues, Alien is retrieved, but Snot is wounded in the gut. Unable to treat his wound, they drop him by a hospital. The rest split to cross the border. Alien travels on a train with Quicky. On the way, she seduces him, and when the group reunites in Slovakia, he confronts and kills his comrades.

Alien and Quicky cross to Ukraine. They return to their home town and keep low profile. Alien is revealed to be a ruthless killer who cleverly starts to pit the gangsters against each other and to manifest herself as an alternative power center. Some associates of Rasp contemplate switching loyalty. Alien sets up an ambush, in which Quicky kills Rasp, but is himself wounded and captured by the police.

Five years later, Snot is released from the Czech prison and returns to the town. An acquaintance briefs him on the situation. By that time, Alien is a major boss controlling much of the town's criminal underworld. Determined to avenge the death of his comrades, Snot asks for a pistol and leaves.

Later Snot ambushes Alien in her luxury apartment. Undaunted, she in quick succession makes several attempts to intimidate, bribe, or seduce him, but he remains adamant and shoots her dead.

Some time later, Arthur and Quicky in the penal colony (where both are serving hefty sentences) discuss that they haven't been seeing packages from Alien in a while. Arthur casually mentions that his sister was nicknamed "Alien" after the character from the eponymous Ridley Scott movie, due to her inhumane ways.

== Cast ==
- Natalia Romanycheva as Angela/Alien
- Evgeniy Tkachuk as Quicky
- Kirill Polukhin as Kid
- Anatoliy Otradnov as Dumbbell
- Aleksandr Golubkov as Snot
- Evgeniy Mundum as Rasp
