= A Rough Draft =

- Theatrical release poster
- Directed by: Sergey Mokritskiy
- Written by: Sergei Lukyanenko; Maхim Budarin; Sergey Artimovich; Denis Kuryshev; Sergey Mokritskiy; Olga Sobenina; Elena Didevich
- Produced by: Natalya Mokritskaya; Ulyana Saveleva; Mila Rozanova; Yekaterina Mtsituridze; Irina Lyubarskaya
- Starring: Nikita Volkov; Yulia Peresild; Yevgeny Tsyganov
- Cinematography: Alexander Tananov
- Music by: Kirill Richter
- Production companies: Columbia Pictures; New People Film Company
- Distributed by: Walt Disney Studios Sony Pictures Releasing CIS
- Release date: 25 May 2018
- Running time: 116 minutes
- Country: Russia
- Language: Russian
- Budget: RUB 200 000 000
- Box office: RUB 209 679 187

A Rough Draft (Russian: Черновик, romanized: Chernovik) is a 2018 Russian science fiction film directed by Sergey Mokritskiy, based on the 2005 novel of the same name by Sergei Lukyanenko and starring Nikita Volkov, Yulia Peresild and Yevgeny Tsyganov. It was released in Russia on May 25, 2018.

== Plot ==
A young resident of Moscow, Kirill is a talented designer of computer games. One day, he is completely erased from the memory of everyone he knew and loved. Kirill learns that he is chosen for an important and mysterious mission. His purpose is to become a customs officer between parallel worlds, of which there are dozens in the universe.

Kirill learns to open the portals to a variety of parallel worlds which represent alternative versions of Moscow: a steampunk Imperial Russia, a post-apocalyptic tropic resort world, a dystopian Gulag world, and a highly advanced utopian world. Over time, Kirill learns that the Earth is a rough draft, a setting for social experiments secretly staged by the government of the utopian world, in order to avoid our mistakes. Learning this, Kirill rebels against his supervisors.

Consequently, Rena survives and the movie ends, hinting towards a sequel...

== Cast ==
- Nikita Volkov as Kirill Maksimov
- Evgeniy Tkachuk as Kotya Chagin
- Olga Borovskaya as Anna
- Yulia Peresild as Rose White
- Severija Janušauskaitė as Renata Ivanova
- Yevgeny Tsyganov as Anton
- Elena Yakovleva as Kirill's mother
- Andrey Rudensky as Kirill's father
- Andrey Merzlikin as Felix
- Irina Khakamada as Irina, politician
- Sergei Lukyanenko as the train passenger

== Critical reception ==
Although the film was one of the most anticipated Russian releases of 2018, it received generally negative reviews from professional critics, receiving 32% on KinoPoisk. The majority of criticism was focused on CGI, acting and an incomprehensible storyline. Critics also panned the film for its changes from the novel. Observer of Kommersant Mikhail Trofimenkov in his review notes that by multiplying the fantasy worlds above the necessary number, the authors doomed the film to madness of entropy. Equally helpless, in the opinion of the author, is the actor's work. Critic Alexey Lytovchenko (Rossiyskaya Gazeta) wrote that in some places it is impossible to differentiate the characters and understand their motives.

А Rough Draft underperformed in the box office.
