= First Oscar =

- Directed by: Sergey Mokritskiy
- Written by: Maksim Budarin; Yury Nenev
- Based on: Moscow Strikes Back by: Ilya Kopalin; Leonid Varlamov
- Produced by: Natalia Mokritskaya (ru); Vadim Vereshchagin
- Starring: Tikhon Zhiznevsky; Anton Momot; Darya Zhovner; Andrey Merzlikin; Nikita Tarasov
- Cinematography: Andrey Naydenov
- Edited by: Anna Krutiy
- Music by: Aleksey Aygi
- Production companies: New People Film Company; Russia-1; VGTRK; Cinema Fund
- Distributed by: Central Partnership
- Release date: April 21, 2022
- Running time: 116 minutes
- Country: Russia
- Languages: Russian; English
- Budget: ₽290 million
- Box office: ₽81 million

First Oscar (Russian: Первый Оскар) is a 2022 Russian historical war film directed by Sergey Mokritskiy. The film produced by New People Film Company also stars Tikhon Zhiznevsky, Anton Momot and Darya Zhovner. The film is dedicated to the history of the creation of the Soviet documentary film Moscow Strikes Back directed by Ilya Kopalin and Leonid Varlamov, filmed in record time, was awarded the first ever Oscar for best feature-length documentary in 1943. This is the first Soviet "Oscar" received by Russian cinematographers for capturing the course of hostilities and find themselves in the center of the Battle of Moscow in 1941.

First Oscar was theatrically released in Russia on April 21, 2022, by Central Partnership.

== Plot ==
In 1941, as German forces approach Moscow at the start of the Great Patriotic War, two young student cameramen, Lev Alperin and Ivan Maisky, choose not to evacuate and instead seek permission to film on the front lines. Both compete for the title of the best cameraman and for the affections of Yuna, a student from the acting department. When the evacuation begins, they refuse to leave and go to the front: Yuna joins a concert troupe to perform for soldiers, while Lev and Ivan become military cameramen. Their rivalry continues on the battlefield, but the devastating realities of war and the bravery of Soviet soldiers change their perspectives, allowing them to capture footage that will become iconic.

Meanwhile, life in Los Angeles continues, where the 15th Oscar ceremony causes a sensation as the Best Documentary award goes to a film from the Soviet Union.

== Cast ==
- Tikhon Zhiznevsky as Ivan Maisky
- Anton Momot as Lev Alperin
- Darya Zhovner as Yuna Gromova
- Andrey Merzlikin as Ilya Kopalin, a documentary film director
- Nikita Tarasov as Leonid Varlamov, a documentary film director
- Fyodor Lavrov as Anatoli Golovnya
- Vasily Mishchenko as studio director
- Mikhail Brashinsky as Iosif Alperin, Lev Alperin's father
- Natalya Pavlenkova as Lev Alperin's mother
- Sergei Puskepalis as Alexander Gromov, Yuna's father
- Alexey Kolgan as Joseph Stalin
- Stanislav Strelkov as Nikolai Vlasik

=== Other cast ===
- Michael Lerner as Louis B. Mayer
- Austin Basis as David O. Selznick
- Robert L. Wilson as Howard Hawks
- Taissa Zveiter as Irene Mayer Selznick
- Eddie Vincent as a reporter
- Daniel Lench as Sid Grauman
- Mandy May Cheetham as Jane Murfin
- Colin Thomas Jennings as Perry Lieber
- Matt Lagan as Fred Beetson
- Paul Dinh-McCrillis as a photographer
- Jordan Laesch as Bob Hope
- Nikita Kologrivyy as Budarin

== Production ==
=== Development ===
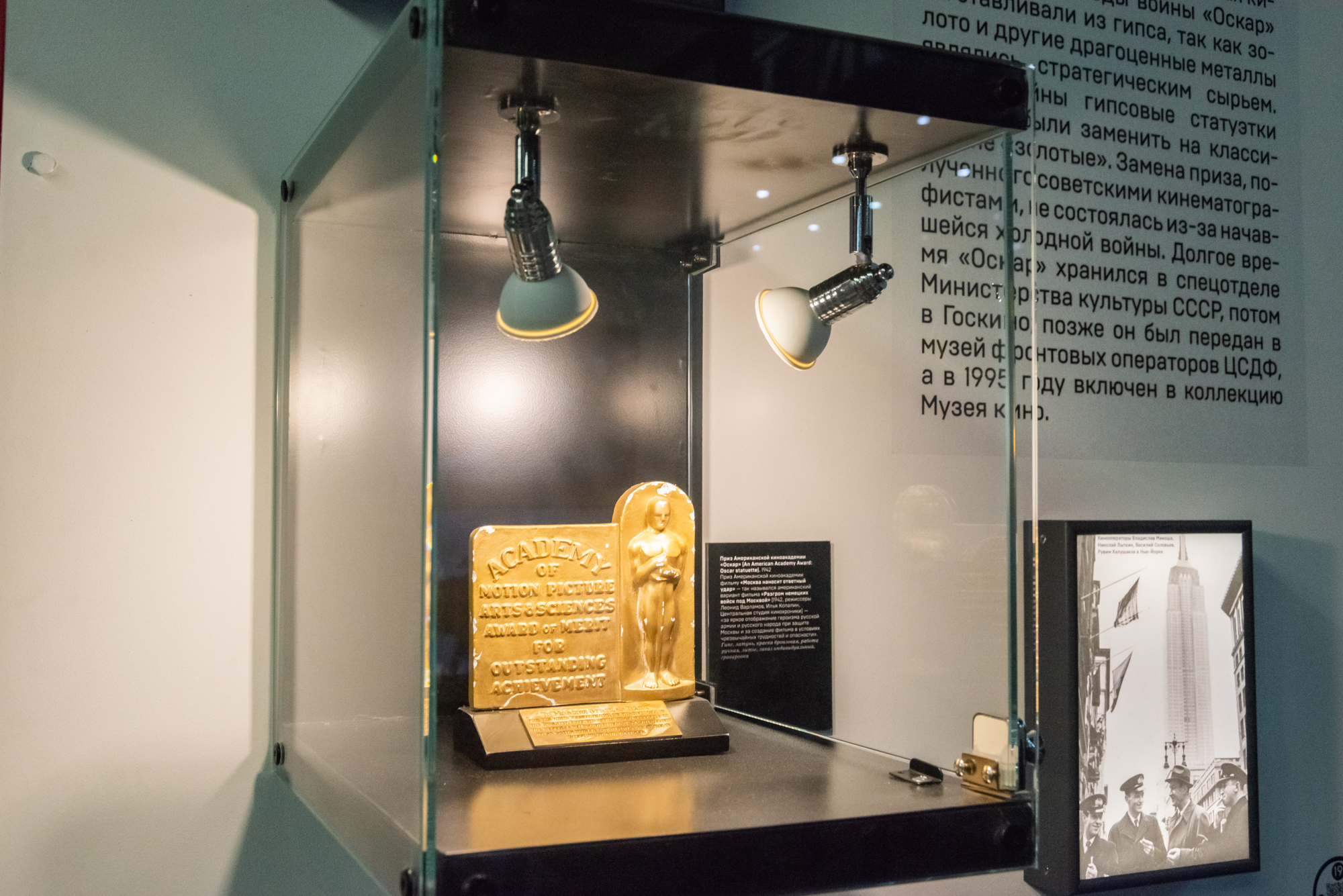
Statuette "Oscar" in the State Central museum of cinema.

The New People Film Company has begun the Russian stage of filming the First Oscar project, which is dedicated to the memory of front-line operators. The film is made by the creative team of the film Battle for Sevastopol, the Federation of Jewish Communities of Russia invited director Sergey Mokritskiy to the Kremlin to present the award. During the ceremony, Sergey met producer Yegor Odintsov (ru), who told him the story of the first Oscar for Soviet cinema. Mokritskiy liked this story, because the topic of war was always close to him.

=== Casting ===
The leading roles in the film First Oscar will be performed by Tikhon Zhiznevsky, Anton Momot, Darya Zhovner, and Andrey Merzlikin. In addition, Hollywood actors were invited to participate in the film, including Oscar nominee Michael Lerner and Austin Basis.

=== Filming ===
Principal photography began on January 31, 2021, in the town of Medyn, Kaluga Oblast. On February 7, the film crew will move to the town of Aleksin, Tula Oblast: filming here will take place until April 30, with the organizational assistance of the Tula Region Film Commission under the government. The premiere of the drama is dedicated to the 80th anniversary of the battle for Moscow.

== Release ==
=== Theatrical ===
The premiere screening of the film First Oscar will take place on April 14 at the Khudozhestvenny cinema in Moscow. The film was theatrically released in the Russian Federation on April 21, 2022, by Central Partnership.
