= Sergey Taramaev =

Soviet and Russian actor and film director

- Born: Sergey Ivanovich Taramaev; 8 October 1958 (age 68); Soviet Union
- Education: GITIS
- Occupations: Actor, director, screenwriter
- Years active: 1984-presents

Sergey Ivanovich Taramaev (Russian: Сергей Иванович Тарамаев; born 8 October 1958) is a Russian film and theatrical actor and film director. He won Russian Guild of Film Critics Award and Golden Eagle Award (2024).

== Selected filmography ==
Actor

- 1995 Small Demon as Peredonov
- 1995 A Moslem as Holy Father Mikhail
- 2007 1612 as episode
- 2008 The Inhabited Island as Ketshev
- 2010 Fortress of War as episode (uncredited)
- 2011 Dostoevsky (TV Mini-Series) as Mikhail Dostoevsky, Fyodor's brother
- 2013 Winter Journey as Slava

Director

- 2013 Winter Journey with Lyubov Lvova
- 2015 Metamorphosis with Lyubov Lvova
- 2018 Dr. Preobrazhensky (TV Series) with Lyubov Lvova
- 2022 Black Spring (TV Series) with Lyubov Lvova
- 2023 Fisher (TV Series) with Lyubov Lvova
