= Baltic Tango =

2017 film by Pavel Chukhray

- Directed by: Pavel Chukhray
- Written by: Pavel Chukhray
- Produced by: Sabina Eremeeva, Alexey Reznikovich
- Starring: Rinal Mukhametov, Yulia Peresild, Sergei Garmash
- Music by: Yuri Poteyenko
- Release date: June 22, 2017
- Running time: 107 minutes
- Country: Russia
- Language: Russian
- Budget: rub 250 million
- Box office: rub 24 million

Baltic Tango (Russian: Холодное танго, romanized: Kholodnoe Tango) is a Russian military-historical drama film from 2017 directed and written by Pavel Chukhray, based on the novel Sell your mother by Efraim Sevela. Baltic Tango was the first work of Pavel Chukhray after a ten — year break. The film stars Yulia Peresild, Rinal Mukhametov, Sergei Garmash. The film was released on June 22, 2017, on The Day of Remembrance and Sorrow (the 76th anniversary of the beginning of the German invasion of the Soviet Union during World War II)

== Plot ==
The film begins in German-occupied Lithuania in 1941. Max is a boy from the Jewish ghetto. His mother and younger sister were murdered by the Nazis at the beginning of the war. Laima is Lithuanian, the daughter of a charcoal burner who had served in the fascist Sonderkommando, during the war. The two fall in love, but they struggle to understand each other. It is even harder to remain decent people in such historical conditions and political situation. "Baltic Tango" is a love drama, a kind of story like Romeo and Juliet, set in the tragic circumstances of the 1940s Europe.

== Cast ==
- Rinal Mukhametov as Max
- Elisey Nikandrov as young Max
- Yulia Peresild as Laima
- Asya Gromova as young Laima
- Sergei Garmash as Grigory Ivanovich Taratuta
- Monika Santaro as Ruta, mother of Max and Lia
- Lera Tkacheva as Lia, Max and Lima daughter
- Andrius Bialobžeskis as Vincas, Lima's father
- Maria Malinovskaya as Lima's mother
- Andrius Darela
- Anna Kotova
- Artur Beschastny
