= Yevgenia Dobrovolskaya =

Soviet and Russian actress (1964–2025)

- Евгения Добровольская
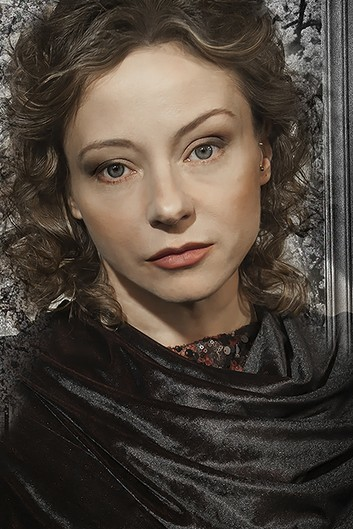
- Born: Yevgenia Vladimirovna Dobrovolskaya; 26 December 1964; Moscow, Russian SFSR, Soviet Union
- Died: 10 January 2025 (aged 60); Moscow
- Resting place: Troyekurovskoye Cemetery
- Education: GITIS
- Occupation: Actress
- Years active: 1983–2025
- Awards: People's Artist of Russia; Merited Artist of Russia

Yevgenia Vladimirovna Dobrovolskaya (Russian: Евге́ния Влади́мировна Доброво́льская; 26 December 1964 – 10 January 2025) was a Soviet and Russian actress of theatre and cinema, People's Artist of the Russian Federation (2005), a laureate of the Nika Award (2001) and Golden Eagle Award (2007).

== Early life and career ==
Dobrovolskaya was born in Moscow, Russian SFSR, Soviet Union on 26 December 1964.

In 1987 she graduated from GITIS (course of Lyudmila Kasatkina and Sergey Kolosov), and 1991 was admitted to the Moscow Chekhov Art Theatre. Starting from 2004, she acted in several plays produced by Kirill Serebrennikov.

She made her debut in the movies in 1983 in the Pavel Chukhrai film A Canary Cage.

In 2014, she took part in an advertising campaign for absorbent underwear, Depend.

== Personal life ==
- First husband — Vyacheslav Baranov (1958–2012), actor.
  - Son Stepan (born 1986).
- Second husband — Mikhail Yefremov, actor (married from January 1990 to December 1997).
  - Son Nikolay (born 1991).
- Son Yan (born 2002) from an extramarital affair with the actor Yaroslav Boyko.
- Third husband — Dmitry Manannikov, cinematographer (2009–2025).
  - Daughter Anastasia (born 2009).

== Illness and death ==
In late 2023, Dobrovolskaya was diagnosed an aggressive form of stomach cancer with subcutaneous and brain metastases. She underwent six courses of chemotherapy and a course of cellular immunotherapy, but the disease progressed by the end of 2024. On 4 December 2024, she entered the palliative care centre in Moscow due to cancer complications. On 10 January 2025, Dobrovolskaya died at the age of 60. The farewell ceremony took place at the Moscow Chekhov Art Theatre on 14 January. She was buried at the Troyekurovskoye Cemetery.

== Selected filmography ==
- A Canary Cage (1983) as Olesya
- Moonzund (1987) as Irina Artenyeva
- I Hope for You (1992) as Alla
- Queen Margot (1996) as Margaret of Valois
- Mechanical Suite (2001) as Lyuba
- Deadly Force (2003) as Marina Korotkova
- Mars (2004) as Galina
- The Wedding Chest (2005) as apothecary
- Actress (2007) as Anna
- The Irony of Fate 2 (2007) as Snegurochka
- The Tale of Soldier Fedot, The Daring Fellow (2008) as nurse of king (voice)
- Jolly Fellows (2009) as Valentina
- Heavenly Court (2011) as Anna Vladimirovna, witness
- Guys from Mars (2011) as Yulia's mother
- Samara (2011)
- The White Guard (2012) as Vanda
- Pyotr Leschenko. Everything That Was... (2013) as Maria Burenina
- Happy End (2021) as Vlad’s mother
- Winter Season (2022) as Katya's mother
