= Margarita Shubina =

Soviet and Russian actress and director

- Маргарита Шубіна
- Born: Margarita Valeryevna Shubina; 4 April 1966 (age 59); Ukrainian SSR
- Occupation: Actress
- Years active: 1984–present

Margarita Valeryevna Shubina (Ukrainian: Маргарита Валеріївна Шубіна, Russian: Маргарита Валерьевна Шубина; born April 4, 1966) is a Soviet and Russian actress and director. She was awarded Honored Artist of Russia (2009).

== Early life ==
As a child, she studied at Art School. In high school, she won the city competition for literature. In her own words she grew up as a daredevil and hooligan, and because of restlessness could not sit long at the painter's easel or writing table.

During her fourth year of study at GITIS on the course of Oscar Remez, Shubina received an offer to appear in an Andrey Goncharov play in the Mayakovsky Theatre. After RATI in 1987 Shubina received invitation from many theaters of the capital. However, she preferred another Mossovet Theatre production.

She made her film debut in 1984, starring in the film of Mikhail Tumanishvili Obstacle. She then appeared in Vadim Zobin film Sunday, half of the seventh, filmed in 1988. She then took obscure roles in some 40 films.

Most famously Shubina portrayed paramedic Orlova role in the television series Ambulance directed by Anatoly Artamonov and Gennady Kayumov. Her directorial debut was Men Lived and Did Not Know.

On April 24, 2009, she was awarded the title of Honored Artist of Russia.

== Personal life ==
Shubina's husband, her former classmate Vladislav, was a former theater actor, and now a businessman. The couple has two sons — Maxim and Seraphim. Maxim's godfather is Andrey Ilin, and Seraphim's godparents are Alexander Samoilenko and Vlad Sadovskaya.

== Filmography ==
Year	Title	Role	Notes
1984	Obstacle	episode	
1988	Sunday, Half of the Seventh	Vera Lomakina	TV mini-series
1991	Edem Hotel	Lyubov	
1992	I Hope for You	Svetka	
1995	On the Corner, at the Patriarch Ponds	Nina	
1995	Black Veil	Maria Ignatova, Rokshin's mistress	
2000	Good and Bad	Zinaida	
2001	Turetsky's Marsh	Bozhena	TV series
2003	Another Woman, Another Man...	Klara	
2003—2005	Ambulance	Nadezhda Mikhailovna Orlova, paramedic of an ambulance	TV series
2009	Svaty 3	Ljubka	TV series
2010	Yolki	orphanage director	
2011	Case No.1 Grocery Store	Galina Brezhneva	
2011	Leto Indigo	alien girl	
2012	This is What Happens to Me	Olga	
2013	Svaty 6	Lyubov Georgievna	TV series
2014	Leviathan	prosecutor	
2016	Provocateur	Alla Feliksovna	
2017	Grafomafiya	Nadezhda Pavlovna	
2022	Svaty 7	Lyubov Georgievna	TV series
