= My Dad Baryshnikov =

- Film poster
- Russian: Мой папа Барышников
- Directed by: Dmitry Povolotsky
- Written by: Dmitry Povolotsky
- Produced by: Natalya Mokritskaya; Mila Rozanova; Ulyana Saveleva
- Starring: Anna Mikhalkova; Dmitry Vyskubenko; Ksenia Surkova; Tina Barkalaya; Vladimir Kapustin; Maria Politseymako
- Cinematography: Sergey Mokritskiy
- Edited by: Olga Grinshpun; Yevgeny Efremenko
- Music by: Aleksandr Manotskov
- Production company: New People
- Release date: June 2011 (Kinotavr Film Festival)
- Running time: 84 min.
- Country: Russia
- Language: Russian

My Dad Baryshnikov (Russian: Мой папа Барышников, romanized: Moy papa Baryshnikov) is a 2011 Russian comedy-drama film directed by Dmitry Povolotsky.

== Plot ==
The film takes place in Moscow during the time of Perestroika. In the outskirts of Moscow, specifically in Solntsevo, resides an adolescent by the name of Borja Fishkin, who finds himself constantly grappling with feelings of inferiority. He shares a home with his mother and attends the esteemed Moscow Choreographic School located at the Bolshoi Theater. His mother, who is youthful and vibrant, holds the position of a tour guide at Intourist.

Boris does not have a father, according to his mother who claims he is on a secret mission. However, Boris begins to speculate that his father could be the renowned dancer and ballet master, Mikhail Baryshnikov, who escaped to Canada in 1974 and now resides and works in the United States. These thoughts arise after watching a video recording of Baryshnikov's performance, as the young man bears a striking resemblance to the famous dancer and differs greatly from the man his mother refers to as his father. Furthermore, it is revealed that his mother personally knew Baryshnikov. Once this news spreads throughout the school, many individuals confirm the resemblance to the "star" and Boris instantly becomes a local sensation.

The real father of the boy, also named Mikhail, is returning from prison at the same time as Boris is being expelled from school due to foolish behavior. Despite the hardships and the changing country, the new trends and customs give the teenager a chance to not be lost but to make a name for himself.

== Cast ==
- Anna Mikhalkova as Larisa
- Dmitry Vyskubenko as Borya Fishkin
- Ksenia Surkova as Katya
- Tina Barkalaya as queen of Spain
- Pyotr Raikov as Aleksei
- Sergey Sosnovsky as Semyon Petrovych
- Egor Dolgopolov as Sanya
- Vladimir Kapustin as Mikhail Fishkin
- Anatoliy Kott as Igor Vasilievich
- Mark Ganeev as Vovan
- Maria Politseymako as Borya's grandmother
