= A Canary Cage =

1983 film directed by Pavel Chukhray

- Russian: Клетка для канареек
- Directed by: Pavel Chukhray
- Written by: Pavel Chukhray; Anatoli Sergeyev
- Starring: Vyacheslav Baranov; Evgeniya Dobrovolskaya; Alisa Freindlich; Boris Bachurin; Semyon Farada
- Cinematography: Mikhail Bits
- Edited by: Antonina Zimina
- Release date: 1983
- Running time: 77 minute
- Country: Soviet Union
- Language: Russian

A Canary Cage (Russian: Клетка для канареек) is a 1983 Soviet drama film directed by Pavel Chukhray.

== Plot ==
The film follows an encounter between two teenagers in crisis whose paths cross at a train station. They are both trapped and both trying to find or make up ways to escape.

== Cast ==
- Vyacheslav Baranov as Viktor
- Evgeniya Dobrovolskaya as Olesya
- Alisa Freindlich as Olesya's mother
- Boris Bachurin as Militiaman (as B. Bachurin)
- Semyon Farada as Attendant
- Valentina Ananina as Railroader
- Galina Komarova as Barmaid
- Aleksandr Konyashin in a bit part (as A. Konyashin)
- Mikhail Chigaryov in a bit part
- Velta Zygure as Conductor
