= I Hope for You =

- Russian: На тебя уповаю
- Directed by: Elena Tsyplakova
- Written by: Nadezhda Pokornaya
- Produced by: Aleksandr Mikhaylov
- Starring: Irina Rozanova; Natalya Sokoreva; Yevgenia Dobrovolskaya; Tatyana Markhel; Natalya Fisson; Vladimir Ilyin
- Cinematography: Ilya Dyomin
- Edited by: Natalya Volchek
- Music by: Valeri Myagkikh
- Production company: 12А
- Release date: 1992
- Running time: 89 min.
- Countries: Russia; Belarus
- Language: Russian

I Hope for You (Russian: На тебя уповаю, romanized: Na tebya upovayu) is a 1992 Russian-Belarusian drama film directed by Elena Tsyplakova.

== Plot ==
A woman who abandoned her child and attempts suicide ends up in a psychiatric hospital, and after treatment gets a job in an orphanage.

== Cast ==
- Irina Rozanova as Ira
- Natalya Sokoreva as Vika (as Natasha Sokoreva)
- Yevgenia Dobrovolskaya as Alla
- Tatyana Markhel as Principal
- Natalya Fisson as Marina
- Vladimir Ilyin as Vika's grandpa
- Dmitry Pevtsov as Kolyunya
- Margarita Shubina as Svetka
- Galina Makarova as Matveyevna
- Natalya Fedortsova as Lena Komarova
- Oksana Sivuga as Gyuzel
- Sergey Batalov as Valya's father

== Critical response ==
Alexander Fedorov noted: "In reality, we've received the usual mix of 'grim reaper'—dreary, oppressive, monotonous. And even good actresses, though they try to liven up the script's formulas, succeed only in the few episodes where a spark of sincerity glimmers". The magazine Iskusstvo Kino in those years wrote: “The film is a rather strange mixture of a newspaper article about the morals of an orphanage and a tabloid story about a lost and found child". It is also included in the booklet by the Republic of Tatarstan titled Film therapy in the preparation of volunteers for work with minors.
