= Atomic Ivan =

- Directed by: Vasily Barkhatov
- Written by: Vasily Barkhatov; Maxim Kurochkin
- Produced by: Elena Glikman; Yaroslav Zhivov
- Starring: Grigoriy Dobrygin; Yuliya Snigir
- Cinematography: Ruslan Gerasimenkov
- Edited by: Sergey Ivanov
- Music by: Sergey Shnurov
- Production companies: Telesto; Rook Studio
- Release date: 2012
- Running time: 91 min.
- Country: Russia
- Language: Russian

Atomic Ivan (Russian: Атомный Иван, romanized: Atomnyy Ivan) is a 2012 Russian romantic comedy film directed by Vasily Barkhatov. The first in the history of a feature film, shot at the existing nuclear power plants (Kalinin and Leningrad) with the support of the state corporation Rosatom.

The world premiere took place on 27 September 2011 in London, at the symposium of the World Association of Nuclear Operators. In the Russian rental movie was released on 29 March 2012.

== Cast ==
- Grigoriy Dobrygin as Ivan
- Yuliya Snigir as Tatyana
- Yekaterina Vasilyeva as Ivan's grandmother
- Oleksiy Gorbunov as Ivan's father
- Marina Golub as neighbor
