= Winter Journey (2013 film) =

- Theatrical release poster
- Directed by: Lyubov Lvova; Sergey Taramaev
- Written by: Lyubov Lvova; Sergey Taramaev
- Produced by: Mikhail Karasev
- Starring: Aleksey Frandetti; Evgeniy Tkachuk
- Cinematography: Mikhail Krichman
- Edited by: Egor Kirpichev
- Production company: Mika Film
- Release dates: August 2013 (Window to Europe Film Festival); 20 February 2014
- Running time: 90 minutes
- Country: Russia
- Language: Russian

Winter Journey (Russian: Зимний путь, translit. Zimniy put') is a 2013 Russian drama film about a young classical singer who falls in love with a street thug. The film takes its title from a Schubert song cycle, Winterreise, that the hero, Erik, a music student, is practising for a competition.

== Plot ==
Music student and gifted singer, Erik, is preparing to sing Schubert's Winterreise for a competition. As his teacher slams him for his poor performance, Erik's life is changed irrevocably by a chance meeting with Lyokha, a coarse and aggressive petty criminal.

== Cast ==
- Aleksey Frandetti as Erik
- Evgeniy Tkachuk as Lyokha
- Sergey Taramaev as Slava
- Egor Koreshkov as Borya
- Vladimir Mishukov as Pasha

== Reception ==
The Dutch film director Jos Stelling described the film as "a genuine film... [which] went straight to my heart. The theme of the alleged homosexuality hardly played a role for me... To me this film sometimes approached the status of a masterpiece for its cinematographic values".

== Awards ==
Award / Film Festival	Year	Category	Recipient(s) and nominee(s)	Result	Ref.
Nika Award	2013	Best Actor	Yevgeny Tkachuk	Nominated	
London Russian Film Festival	2013	Best Film	Winter Journey	Won	
Lecce European Film Festival	2014	Best Cinematography	Mikhail Krichman	Won	
