= The Russian Game =

- Russian: Русская игра
- Directed by: Pavel Chukhray
- Written by: Pavel Chukhray; Nikolay Gogol
- Produced by: Irina Baskakova; Sergey Shumakov
- Starring: Sergey Makovetskiy; Sergey Garmash; Andrey Merzlikin; Giuliano Di Capua; Dmitriy Vysotskiy
- Cinematography: Vladimir Klimov; Andrey Zhegalov
- Edited by: Mariya Sergeenkova
- Music by: Yuriy Poteenko
- Release date: 2007
- Country: Russia
- Language: Russian

The Russian Game (Russian: Русская игра) is a 2007 Russian comedy film directed by Pavel Chukhray.

== Plot ==
The film tells about the Italian card cheater Lukino Forza, whom his creditors found and forced to sign a mortgage on everything he possesses. He was given a week during which he must collect debts, otherwise he will go to jail, and he decides to go to Russia, where he plans to use his talents.

== Cast ==
- Sergey Makovetskiy
- Sergey Garmash
- Andrey Merzlikin
- Giuliano Di Capua
- Dmitriy Vysotskiy
- Avangard Leontev
- Ignat Akrachkov
- Yuriy Maslak
