= Battle for Sevastopol =

- Russian theatrical release poster
- Directed by: Sergey Mokritskiy
- Written by: Maksim Budarin; Maksim Dankevich; Leonid Korin; Egor Olesov
- Produced by: Natalia Mokritskaya; Egor Olesov
- Starring: Yulia Peresild; Joan Blackham; Yevgeny Tsyganov; Oleg Vasilkov; Vitaliy Linetskiy
- Cinematography: Yury Korol'
- Music by: Evgeniy Galperin
- Production company: Kinorob
- Distributed by: 20th Century Fox
- Release date: April 2, 2015 (Russia)
- Running time: 122 minutes
- Countries: Russia; Ukraine
- Languages: Russian; Ukrainian (dubbed); English (dubbed); Spanish (dubbed)

Battle for Sevastopol (Russian: «Битва за Севастополь», romanized: Bitva za Sevastopol, lit. 'Battle for Sebastopol'; titled in Ukrainian: «Незламна», romanized: Nezlamna, lit. 'Unbreakable') is a 2015 biographical war film about Lyudmila Pavlichenko, a young Soviet woman who joined the Red Army to fight the German invasion of the USSR and became one of the deadliest snipers in World War II. The film, a joint Russian-Ukrainian production, was released in both countries on 2 April 2015, and its international premiere took place two weeks later at the Beijing International Film Festival.

The film principally revolves around the events of the siege of Odessa and the siege of Sevastopol of 1941–42.

The film was directed by Sergey Mokritskiy and stars Yulia Peresild as Pavlichenko. In addition to the Beijing International Film Festival, where Peresild was awarded the Best Actress award, the film was also screened at the Cannes Film Festival.

== Plot ==
In 1937, Lyudmila Pavlichenko is a student who has just passed the entrance exams for Kiev State University; to celebrate, she goes to a shooting range with her friends including a female classmate named Masha. In a twist of events, her almost perfect shooting results at the range eventually result in the Red Army contacting her to enter a sharpshooting program. A Jewish doctor named Boris attempts to court her, but she rejects him and leaves to fight on the Eastern Front following the German invasion.

Eventually Lyudmila is partnered with a grizzled veteran sniper named Makarov, with whom she falls in love. He doesn't return her affections, however, and explains that he lost his family when the Germans invaded. She is also reunited with Masha, who is now a nurse engaged to a young pilot. While defending the city of Odessa, she is injured and Makarov drags her to safety to a local hospital, where Boris has volunteered as a military doctor. After awakening, Lyudmila manages to get Boris to sign her papers so that she can return to the front lines, but finds out that Makarov has died in battle and the Soviets are retreating to Sevastopol.

Once back on the front, Lyudmila is paired with a male sniper named Leonid. She begins to wound enemy soldiers to watch them suffer, to her new partner's horror. Despite a rough start to the relationship, the two eventually develop a close romance. Masha, now a nurse on the front line, invites them to her wedding, but then reveals the death of her fiancé. This development leads Lyudmila to tell Leonid privately that she wants a son.

While on patrol in a field, Leonid steps on a mine that triggers a flare, signalling artillery fire on to the pair's position. Lyudmila again wakes up in a field hospital, where Boris tells her Leonid died in the ambush. Though wounded and exhausted, she is ordered to kill a top enemy sniper for Soviet propaganda. The duel lasts for an entire day; tired of waiting, Lyudmila steps out of cover, exposing herself completely. She is shot, but manages to pinpoint the enemy sniper's location and kill him. As Sevastopol is being evacuated under siege, Boris carries a wounded and traumatized Lyudmila to a submarine that is evacuating the city. While panicked civilians attempt to board, Lyudmila realizes that Boris gave her his own papers to leave the city. A voiceover reveals that Boris, Masha, and countless civilians and soldiers died defending the city from the Germans.

Lyudmila's military record makes her a vital propaganda tool for the Soviets, who parade her around the world to collect funds for the fight against fascism. Encouraged by a meeting with the American First Lady, Eleanor Roosevelt, Lyudmila attempts to embrace her femininity by wearing a dress during a speech in New York. Though the Soviet propaganda minister on tour with her forces her to change back in to a Red Army uniform, she makes a vital impression on the largely male crowd, asking, "Don't you think, gentlemen, that you have been hiding behind my back for too long?" After the success of Lyudmila's speech, she is approached by American folk singer Woody Guthrie, who eventually writes a song based on her exploits.

Roosevelt later visits Lyudmila after the war in Moscow during a 1957 trip. The two attend the opera together with Lyudmila's son who is implied to be Leonid's as well.

== Cast ==
- Yulia Peresild – Lyudmila Pavlichenko
- Yevgeny Tsyganov – Leonid Kitsenko
- Oleg Vasilkov – Captain Makarov
- Nikita Tarasov – Boris Chopak
- Joan Blackham – Eleanor Roosevelt
- Polina Pakhomova – Masha
- Vladimir Lilitsky – Grisha, 1st pilot
- Anatoliy Kot – Nikolai, 2nd pilot
- Natella Abeleva-Taganova – Sonya Chopaka
- Valery Grishko – Ivan Yefimovich Petrov
- Sergei Barkovsky – Filipp Oktyabrsky
- Vitaliy Linetskyy – Major, recruit trainer
- Sergei Puskepalis – 1st commander
- Gennady Chentsov – commissar
- Svetlana Osadchenko – the reader
- Vyacheslav Nikolenko – Woody Guthrie
- Mariya Khomutova – Kursantka

== Production ==
Filming began in 2012 after the first archive material devoted to Pavlichenko was examined. Serhiy Mokrytskyi, who is better known as a cinematographer, served as director; after his arrival, the plot was altered to more closely match Pavlichenko's life. During production, there was concern of the growing political tension between Russia and Ukraine. The film was released in both countries on the same day in each country's own respective language, though the film's title was changed to Unbreakable for its release in Ukraine.

== Box office ==
The film grossed RUB 435,468,256 ($8,702,274) in the Russian box office against a budget of RUB 124,000,000 and hence was a commercial success.
