= Parents of the Strict Regime =

- Theatrical release poster
- Directed by: Nikita Vladimirov
- Written by: Andrey Taratukhin; Yulia Krutova
- Produced by: Nikita Vladimirov; Nadezhda Sinderikhina; Alla Nyukvist; Nikolay Kostomarov
- Starring: Evgeniy Tkachuk; Alisa Freindlich; Aleksandr Adabashyan; Olga Medynich; Igor Khripunov
- Cinematography: Sergey Astakhov
- Edited by: Olga Grinshpun
- Music by: Fyodor Zhuravlyov
- Production company: "Art for People" Film Company
- Distributed by: MVK (English: Cartoon in the cinema)
- Release date: April 14, 2022 (Russia)
- Running time: 79 minutes
- Country: Russia
- Language: Russian
- Box office: ₽40 million

Parents of the Strict Regime (Russian: Родители строгого режима, romanized: Roditeli strogogo rezhima) is a 2022 Russian tragicomedy film directed and produced by Nikita Vladimirov. The film tells about an elderly couple who suddenly find out that their 38-year-old mayor son is in fact a corrupt official and a bribe-taker, and they decide to invite him to their house, where they lock him up in the hope that he can be re-educated. The film stars Yevgeny Tkachuk, Alisa Freindlich, and Aleksandr Adabashyan.

It was theatrically released in Russia on April 14, 2022, by MVK (English: Cartoon in the cinema).

== Plot ==
A married couple turns to a psychologist because of problems with a child - their son Boris Litvin is rude, lies and steals. After talking with a specialist, they take decisive action and put their son under house arrest. True, their "boy" is already thirty-seven years old and he is the mayor of the city. While Boris is looking for his wife, the administration and the police, he is being "re-educated" by his parents - he goes for a walk in the yard by the hour, and also works in his father's workshop, because work, as you know, ennobles a person.

== Cast ==
- Evgeniy Tkachuk as Boris Litvin, a corrupt mayor, and a son
- Alisa Freindlich as Vera Litvina, a mother
- Aleksandr Adabashyan as Valentin Litvin, a father
- Olga Medynich as Svetlana, Boris's wife
- Igor Khripunov as Misha
- Vladimir Sychyov as a Russian policeman
- Valeria Fedorovich as a female psychologist
- Elena Rufanova as chief physician

== Production ==
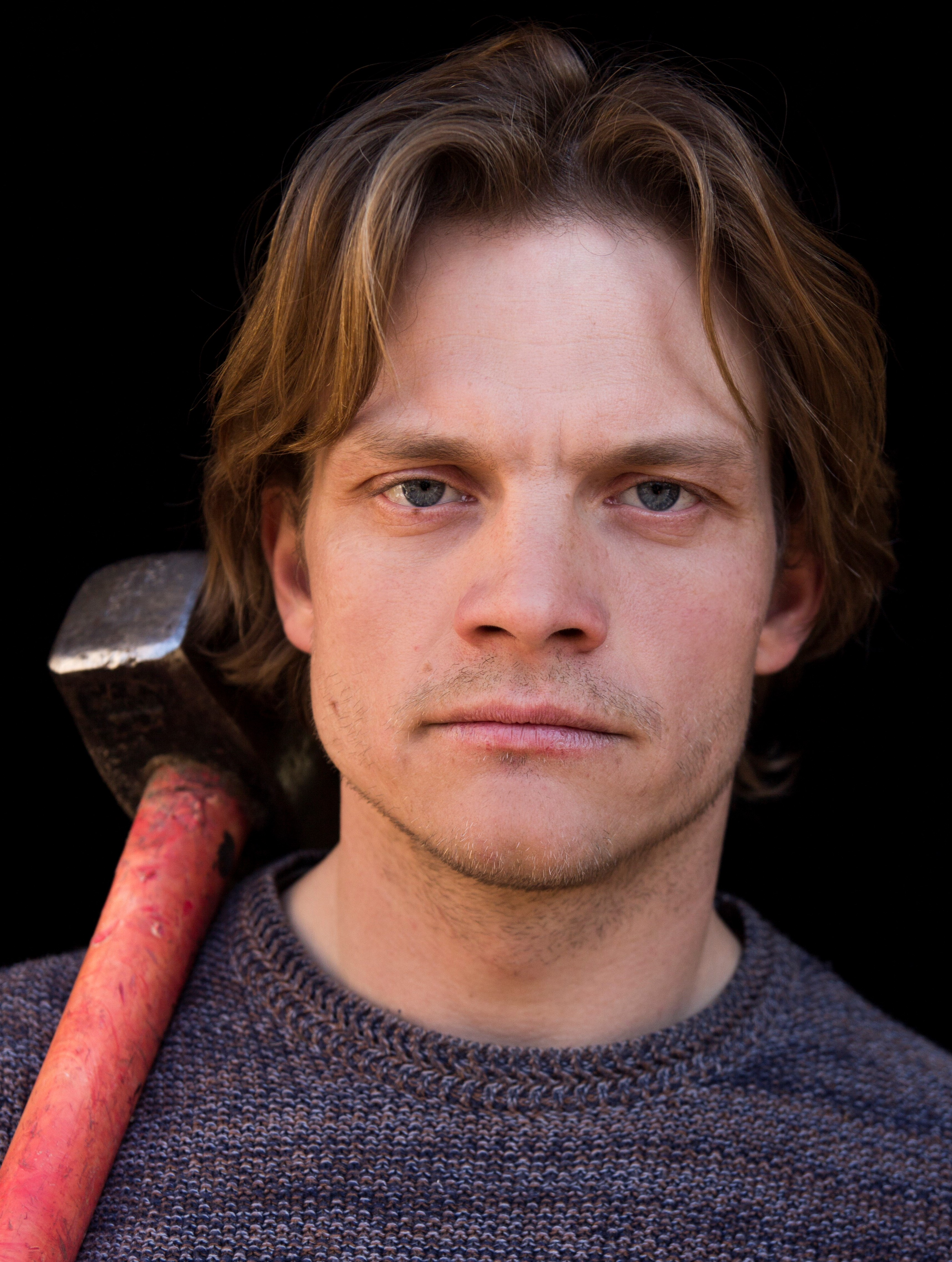
Yevgeny Tkachuk as Boris Litvin

As the portal of culture of Saint Petersburg clarifies, the full-length picture of director Nikita Vladimirov will be presented by Alisa Freindlich, who has rarely pleased fans of her work with her appearance on the big screen in recent years, as well as Aleksandr Adabashyan, Yevgeny Tkachuk, and members of the crew.

in 2015, the distributor of this comedy picture in the Russian territory is the company "Mult" TV channel (English: "Cartoon" TV channel), together with the All-Russia State Television and Radio Broadcasting Company (VGTRK), launched a unique project on the film market, "MULT V KINO" (English: "CARTOON IN THE CINEMA"), which has now changed its name to MVK distributors.

== Release ==
It was theatrically released the Russian Federation should take place in cinemas from April 14, 2022, by MVK.

=== Marketing ===
The first teaser trailer for Parents of the Strict Regime was released on April 1, 2022.

== See also ==
- House Arrest (1996 film)
