= Zemun (film) =

- Directed by: Eduard Zholnin
- Written by: Eduard Zholnin
- Produced by: Aleksey Uchitel; Vasily Balashov; Elena Bystrova
- Starring: Evgeniy Tkachuk; Ivan Rashetnyak; Oleg Yagodin; Ekaterina Shumakova; Andrey Ilyin; Vyacheslav Garder; Anatoliy Dubanov; Nikita Kostyukevich
- Cinematography: Maxim Efros
- Music by: Anatoly Gonye
- Production company: Rock Films
- Distributed by: Volga
- Release date: August 31, 2021 (Russia)
- Country: Russia
- Language: Russian

Zemun (Russian: Земун) is a Russian mystical neo-Western film directed by Eduard Zholnin.

== Plot ==
Yegor's father has been mysteriously murdered, causing Yegor to travel to the village where he was born to try to talk his brother into selling his father's inheritance as soon as possible. But, having arrived in the village, Yegor begins to understand that he, his brother and the inheritance are in great danger.

== Cast ==
- Evgeniy Tkachuk as Yegor
- Ivan Rashetnyak as Pashka
- Oleg Yagodin as Gleb
- Ekaterina Shumakova
- Andrey Ilyin
- Vyacheslav Garder as Vlas
- Anatoliy Dubanov
- Nikita Kostyukevich
