= Anton Lapenko =

Russian actor (born 1986)

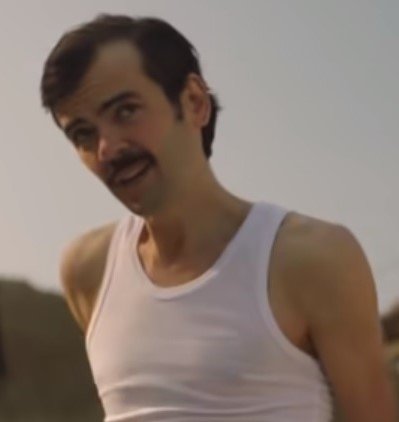
- Born: Anton Vyacheslavovich Lapenko; September 1, 1986; Zelenograd, Moscow, USSR
- Occupations: actor, film director

Anton Vyacheslavovich Lapenko (Russian: Антон Вячеславович Лапенко; September 1, 1986 in Zelenograd, Moscow, USSR) is a Russian film and theater actor.

== Biography ==
Anton Lapenko grew up in a family of 16 kids. In 2011 he graduated from the acting faculty of Gerasimov Institute of Cinematography, after which he entered Electrotheatre Stanislavsky. In 2011 Lapenko won the «Golden Leaf» award as one of the best young actors graduated from a Moscow film or acting school.

Since 2010 he has acted in a few Russian movies. In 2020 Lapenko has been interviewed by Yuri Dud, which was referred to by an Echo Moskvy journalist as a highest award.

In 2019 Anton appeared in IP Pirogova russian TV series with Yelena Podkaminskaya

== Instagram videos and «Within Lapenko» ==
In 2019 Lapenko became famed as an author of humorous Instagram sketches, styled as retro VHS videos. Characters played by Lapenko include a self-doubting engineer, a journalist producing the TV show The Mystery of the Hole, and an eccentric steamroller driver Igor Katamaranov. By January 2020, Lapenko's channel had 1,500,000 subscribers.

In December 2019 Lapenko published the movie series Within Lapenko on YouTube. The series were created by him (he also played all of the characters) alongside comedian Aleksei Smirnov (the screenwriter and film director). The plot is based on the life and adventures of characters from Lapenko's Instagram videos. According to the authors' presentation of the series, it is styled like late Soviet movies and isn't set in a particular time, but rather features a universe which combines the 1980s and 1990s.

Egor Maksimov from Maxim Online referred to the series as a parody of all genres of Soviet TV. Lapenko is compared to Leonid Gaidai and to Monty Python, not in the least due to his absurdist humour.

"Within Lapenko" doesn't intend to develop a powerful storyline or strong plot constructions; its focus is rather on an intriguing central character and absurd situations that he experiences.

== Personal life ==
Anton is in a relationship with singer Musya Totibadze.

== Filmography ==
=== Film ===
Year	Title	Role	Notes
2015	Ugonshchik		
2018	The Grail	Knight	
2019	Zhara		
2020	Deeper!	Khachatryan	
2020	Yezdok		
2021	Boomerang	Reporter	
2022	Like a Man	Gleb	
2023	Bezumnyy angel Pinokkio	Foreigner	Post-production
