= Dead Mountain =

- Dyatlov Pass
- Genre: historical drama Thriller detective mysticism
- Created by: Ilya Kulikov
- Written by: Ilya Kulikov; Vasily Vnukov; Alexander Sysoev
- Directed by: Valery Fedorovich; Evgeny Nikishov; Pavel Kostomarov; Stepan Gordeyev
- Starring: Pyotr Fyodorov; Maria Lugovaya; Andrey Dobrovolsky; Ivan Mulin; Alexander Metelkin; Irina Lukina; Egor Beroev; Evgeny Antropov; Maria Matsel; Maxim Emelyanov; Roman Evdokimov; Yuri Deynekin; Maxim Kostromykhin
- Country of origin: Russia
- No. of seasons: 1
- No. of episodes: 8

Production
- Executive producer: Pyotr Shakhlevich
- Producers: Valery Fedorovich; Evgeny Nikishov; Andrey Semyonov; Ivan Golomovzyuk (lead); Olga Kurenkova (lead); Alexander Sysoev (creative)
- Production location: Khibiny
- Cinematography: Gleb Filatov; Aleksey Strelov; David Khayznikov (episode 1)
- Running time: 45 min.
- Production company: 1-2-3 Production

Original release
- Network: TNT; Premier
- Release: 16 November – 26 November 2020

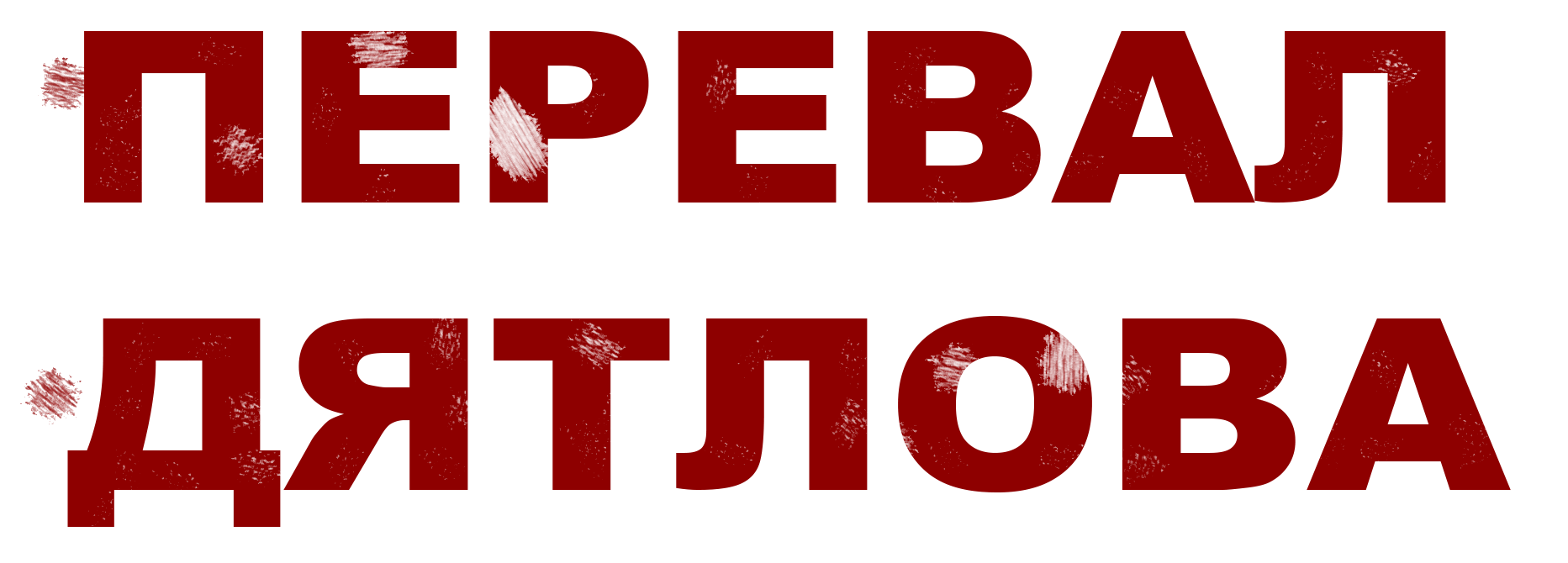
Dead Mountain Russian logo

Dyatlov Pass is a 2020 Russian television series in the genre of historical drama, created by the studio 1-2-3 Production. The project is based on real events and consists of eight episodes dedicated to the Dyatlov Pass incident of early 1959 and the investigation into its causes.

The creators — directors and producers Valery Fedorovich and Evgeny Nikishov, along with writer Ilya Kulikov — gained access to classified materials from 1959, materials from the 2000s investigation, and the diaries of the deceased hikers.

Many characters are real people whose biographies were reconstructed with documentary accuracy. Fictional characters include the protagonist, KGB Major Oleg Kostin, as well as Shumanova, Okunev, and characters appearing in the WWII scenes.

The series premiered on 16 November 2020 on TNT and the streaming service Premier.

== Plot ==
On the night of 1–2 February 1959, near Mount Kholat Syakhl in northern Sverdlovsk Oblast, a group of nine students led by Igor Dyatlov perish. The hikers were to ski more than 300 km and climb two peaks of the Northern Ural — Otorten and Oyka-Chakur. A team led by KGB Major Oleg Kostin is assigned to uncover the reason behind the tragedy.

Odd-numbered episodes depict the investigation, while even-numbered episodes portray the hikers’ expedition.

== Cast ==
- Pyotr Fyodorov — Oleg Kostin, KGB major
- Maria Lugovaya — Yekaterina Shumanova, forensic expert
- Andrey Dobrovolsky — Alexander Okunev, KGB captain
- Ivan Mulin — Igor Dyatlov, expedition leader
- Alexander Metelkin — Yuri Doroshenko
- Irina Lukina — Lyudmila Dubinina
- Egor Beroev — Semyon Zolotaryov
- Evgeny Antropov — Alexander Kolevatov
- Maria Matsel — Zinaida Kolmogorova
- Maxim Emelyanov — Yuri Krivonischenko
- Roman Evdokimov — Rustem Slobodin
- Yuri Deynekin — Nikolay Thibeaux-Brignolle
- Maxim Kostromykhin — Yuri Yudin

== Ratings ==
The first episode achieved an 18.7% share among TNT's target audience aged 14–44.

Russian critics named the series the best Russian TV show of 2020.

The series was also ranked best Russian series of 2020 by Kino Mail.ru.

It received the Third National Web Industry Award for Best Internet Series (episode over 24 minutes).

== Release ==
The German division of Disney acquired the rights to air the series on the subscription channel Fox German for German-speaking viewers. The rights to broadcast the project were also sold to the SVOD platform Cirkus, which targets audiences in countries such as Sweden, Denmark, Iceland, Finland, and Norway.
