= Vozvrashchenie s fronta =

Return From the Front
- Directed by: Nikolay Gadomsky
- Written by: Yelena Chubenko; Nikolay Gadomsky
- Produced by: Aleksandr Sapozhnikov
- Starring: Lyubov Gamova; Anatoly Gorkovenko; Yelena Zorina; Elvira Plotnikova; Svetlana Alferova; Yuliya Prosyannikova; Dmitry Shestakov
- Cinematography: Yevgeny Kharchenko
- Music by: Alexey Arkhipovsky
- Release date: April 21, 2022
- Running time: 75 minutes
- Country: Russia
- Language: Russian

Return From the Front (Russian: Возвращение с фронта, romanized: Vozvrashchenie s fronta) is a 2022 Russian war drama film directed by Nikolay Gadomsky. It is scheduled to be theatrically released on April 21, 2022.

== Plot ==
The film takes place during the Great Patriotic War. The film tells about a young girl who returns home from the front, where she was a nurse and saved Soviet soldiers. But even at home she does not find peace, as she is haunted by monstrous memories.

== Cast ==
- Lyubov Gamova
- Anatoly Gorkovenko
- Yelena Zorina
- Elvira Plotnikova
- Svetlana Alferova
- Yuliya Prosyannikova
- Dmitry Shestakov
