= A Fairy Tale for the Old =

- Movie poster
- Directed by: Fyodor Lavrov; Roman Mikhaylov
- Written by: Roman Mikhaylov
- Produced by: Yuliya Vityazeva
- Starring: Kirill Polukhin; Fyodor Lavrov; Roman Mikhaylov; Evgeniy Tkachuk; Viktoria Miroshnichenko; Anatoly Tishin; Oleg Vasilkov; Oleg Garkusha
- Cinematography: Alexey Rodionov
- Edited by: Roman Mikhaylov; Alexey Rodionov
- Music by: Anton Zavyalov
- Production company: Frut Time
- Release date: October 13, 2022 (Russia)
- Running time: 80 min.
- Country: Russia
- Language: Russian

A Fairy Tale for the Old (Russian: Сказка для старых, romanized: Skazka dlya starykh) is a Russian crime drama film directed by Fyodor Lavrov and Roman Mikhaylov. This film was theatrically released on October 13, 2022. The film won the Golden Taiga Award at the 20th Spirit of Fire Film Festival (Russia).

The film follows a crime boss who decides to send his children to look for a bandit named Muli, who was killed three years ago and suddenly met in three cities at the same time. Each of the characters now goes to a place where everything is not as it seems.

== Plot ==
One of the main characters, "Junior," shares a bizarre story with a friend at a bar. Three years after the criminal stash-keeper Muliya vanished with gang money and was believed dead, rumors emerge that he’s been spotted alive in three different cities: Saint Petersburg, Novosibirsk, and Rostov. The crime boss Batya sends his three “sons” — Senior, Middle, and Junior — to investigate. In Novosibirsk, Senior gets help from a local dwarf skilled at finding people and follows him through abandoned buildings and snowy wastelands, eventually encountering a group of celebrants in costumes. In Saint Petersburg, Junior reconnects with an old acquaintance, only to realize the thugs meant to assist him are actually targeting this friend. They discover a lead on Muliya, and a guide takes Junior by elevator to a mysterious location. Meanwhile, in Rostov, Middle is scammed and left stranded in the woods. While seeking help, he encounters men transporting a coffin holding a man who looks exactly like Muliya. They arrive at a wake hosted by Yakov the Stableman, who looks just like Muliya. Middle suspects this must be him, but the villagers claim otherwise.

The next day, Middle and Yakov/Muliya start a journey to bring him to Batya, but they’re interrupted by a costumed procession. Searching for Yakov/Muliya, Middle enters a nearby house through a metal door and stumbles into a kitchen where Muliya, Batya, Senior, and Junior are all calmly sitting together, chatting. They drink tea and discuss the end of winter and the coming of spring. When Middle, overwhelmed by the absurdity of everything he has witnessed, expresses his confusion, Senior advises him to simply accept things as they are and wish everyone a good spring. At this, everyone bursts into laughter, bringing an air of surreal completion to their journey.

== Cast ==
- Kirill Polukhin as Shooter
- Fyodor Lavrov as Average
- Roman Mikhaylov as Jr
- Evgeniy Tkachuk as Mulya
- Viktoria Miroshnichenko as Mulya's girlfriend
- Anatoly Tishin as Dad
- Oleg Vasilkov as bandit from Novosibirsk
- Oleg Garkusha as villager
- Sergei Pakhomov as club owner in St. Petersburg
- Andrei Blednyy as conductor
- Eldar Salavatov as cameo
- Mikhail Kurtov as episode
