= The Nutcracker and the Magic Flute =

2022 animated film

- Theatrical release poster
- Directed by: Viktor Glukhushin; Georgi Gitis
- Written by: Vasily Rovensky
- Based on: The Nutcracker
- Produced by: Sergei Selyanov
- Starring: Lyubov Aksyonova; Ryan Andes; Prokhor Chekhovsky
- Edited by: Serik Beyseu; Polina Stancheva
- Music by: Mikhail Chertishchev; Pyotr Ilyich Tchaikovsky; Georgiy Zheryakov
- Production company: CTB Film Company
- Distributed by: Atmosfera Kino
- Release dates: November 3, 2022 (Italy); December 8, 2022 (Russia)
- Running time: 88 minutes
- Countries: Russia, Hungary
- Language: Russian
- Budget: RUR 350 million
- Box office: $3 million

The Nutcracker and the Magic Flute is a 2022 Christmas musical fantasy film. Loosely based on Tchaikovsky's ballet The Nutcracker, the film also contains elements from other fairytales and musical works.

== Plot ==
Marie lives with her widowed mother in the house their father had left them. She is a talented dancer but her mother is unable to pay the debts left by her deceased husband. A former creditor of the latter, Mr Ratter, offers to marry Marie and erase the debts. She refuses but Ratter leaves her a wooden nutcracker in the shape of a soldier, before departing. At night, Marie is magically shrunk, while all her toys and the nutcracker come to life. They are attacked by a rat and despite all the others' advice, the soldier, who remembers his name is George, leaves after the rat, in a tunnel that leads to a subterranean realm. He is followed by Marie and two of her animal toys. They want to help him reconquer the kingdom, which was being taken over by rats who can take human forms; among those is George's stepmother, while his father the king, one of the few remaining real human beings in the castle, is being kept prisoner in a constant state of somnolence. George and Marie manage to defeat the rats and liberate the kingdom. After that Marie vanishes and returns to her house, and thinking all this was a dream, Marie decides to marry the creditor. But then the prince arrives and informs the creditor that he bought all of the creditor's debt and proposes to Marie. Then they live happily ever after.

== Voice cast ==
- Dan Edwards as Prince George
- Alyson Leigh Rosenfeld as Marie
- Jason Griffith as Curly the Ram
- H.D. Quinn as Red Beak the Ostrich
- Pete Zarustica as Mr. Ratter and other voices
- Marc Thompson as the Ancient Scroll and other voices
- Vanessa Johansson as Queen Charlotte, Philip’s mother, George’s stepmother and King Edward’s Wife
- Erica Schroeder as Marie's mother
- Nicholas Corda as Prince Philip, Charlotte’s son and George’s step brother
- Ryan Andes as King Edward, George’s father
- Mary O'Brady as Grandmother's ghost

=== Additional voices ===
- Simona Berman
- Kate Bristol
- Wayne Grayson
- Samara Naeymi
- Sara Rahman
- Billy Bob Thompson
- Tom Wayland

== Music ==
The Nutcracker and the Magic Flute contains various pieces from The Nutcracker but also from other works by Tchaikovsky, including excerpts of Swan Lake. Despite its title and the presence of music by Mozart in the soundtrack, the film has little to do with The Magic Flute. It also contains music by Gluck as well as Brahms' Hungarian Dances.

== Reception ==
The Guardian was very critical of the film. The political advocacy group Children and Media Australia wrote that The Nutcracker and the Magic Flute contains "outdated gender roles" and Common Sense Media gave it 3 stars out of 5. "Blending Alice in Wonderland and The Lion, the Witch and the Wardrobe fantastical thrills with the classic story, this animated tale just feels awkward and stilted.", commented Starbust.
