= The Land of Sasha =

- Theatrical release poster
- Directed by: Yulia Trofimova
- Written by: Yulia Trofimova; Elizaveta Tikhonova; Maria Shulgina
- Produced by: Katerina Mikhailova; Konstantin Fam
- Starring: Mark Eidelstein; Maria Matsel
- Cinematography: Yegor Povolotskiy
- Edited by: Marcel Shamshulin
- Music by: Sergei Stern
- Color process: Vadim Saprykin
- Production company: Vega Film
- Distributed by: Central Partnership
- Release date: 2022
- Running time: 83 min.
- Country: Russia
- Language: Russian

The Land of Sasha (Russian: Страна Саша, romanized: Strana Sasha) is a Russian coming-of-age film directed by Yulia Trofimova, filmed by Vega Film based on the young adult book of the same name by Russian writer Gala Uzryutova.

The world premiere of the film took place on February 15, 2022, in Berlin, the film was included in the Generation 14+ program of the 72nd Berlin International Film Festival.

== Plot ==
Seventeen-year-old Sasha struggles to choose a university and shies away from serious relationships with girls, blaming his indecision on his father, who abandoned him in early childhood. Meeting an unusual girl named Zhenya, along with a confrontation with his father, forces Sasha to finally face adulthood.

== Cast ==
- Mark Eidelstein as Sasha
- Maria Matsel as Zhenya
- Yevgenia Gromova as Sophia, Sasha's mother
- Dmitry Endaltsev as Maxim
- Alisa Tarasenko as Liza
- Maxim Shpakovsky as Sasha's father
- Daria Rumyantseva as Natella

== Reception ==
=== Box office ===
The Land of Sasha has grossed $221 960.

=== Critical response ===
In 2022, the film was longlisted for the Golden Eagle National Cinematography Award, established by the National Academy of Motion Picture Arts and Sciences of Russia, in the nominations Best Feature Film and Best Actor in a Movie (Mark Eidelstein).

Zoe Aiano from East European Film Bulletin notes in its review that "while ‘Land of Sasha’ is largely traditional, it also subtly departs from numerous representational clichés, but always keeps it in the background without overburdening the characters or plot with a clumsy remark".

According to Timur Aliev (Forbes Russia), "Trofimova's film looks like a holistic, multifaceted statement about the nature of a new generation of young men and women, which means that the director managed to write a three-dimensional portrait of today's youth".
