= Yuliya Snigir =

Russian actress and model

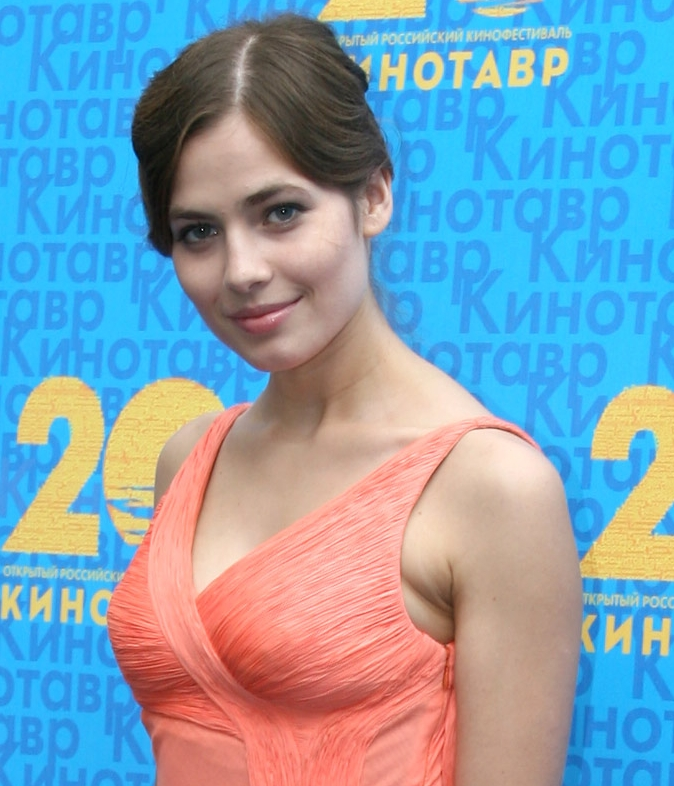
- Snigir at the 20th Sochi Open Russian Film Festival in 2009
- Born: 2 June 1983 (age 43); Donskoy, Tula Oblast, Russian SFSR, Soviet Union
- Occupations: Model, actress
- Years active: 2006–present
- Spouse: Yevgeny Tsyganov (m. 2019)
- Children: 1
- Modeling information
- Height: 1.67 m (5 ft 6 in)

Yuliya Viktorovna Snigir (Russian: Юлия Викторовна Снигирь; born 2 June 1983) is a Russian actress and model.

== Life and career ==
Yuliya Snigir was born in Donskoy, Tula Oblast, Russian SFSR. She graduated from high school number 20 in Donskoy. Hoping to get a good education, she went to Moscow and entered the Faculty of Foreign Languages of the Moscow State Pedagogical University (studying English Philology).

Snigir had to study and work at the same time to support herself financially. She was teaching English in the nursery school, when a friend showed photos of Yuliya to a representative from a Moscow modeling agency. While continuing to study at University, Snigir became a successful model. She was offered a contract with a French jewellery brand and planned to move to France when a casting-director saw her at the modeling agency and invited her to an audition. Her acting career started when she was accepted to the Vakhtangov Theatre Academy. Her cinematic debut was in the film The Last Slaughter, which was followed by Vaccine and Gloss.

Her big break through came when she was offered one of the leading roles in the Russian sci-fi blockbuster The Inhabited Island (2008) and the sequel The Inhabited Island: Skirmish. Yulia became the face of L'Oréal in Russia, as well as Mexx clothing and Mexx perfume.

She hosted the show Theory of Relativity on STS in 2009. In 2010 she became a TV presenter on the channel Petersburg – Channel 5.

She appeared in film A Good Day to Die Hard (2013) alongside Bruce Willis. In the film, she played a Russian antagonist named Irina.

In 2015, Channel One released a 12-episode historical television series Catherine the Great, in which the actress played the title role.

In 2019, Snigir married actor Yevgeny Tsyganov. They have one child together, a son.

On January 25, 2024, the film The Master and Margarita came out where Yulia Snigir plays the title role of Margarita.

In 2024, Yulia Snigir won the Nika Award in the "Best Actress" category.

== Filmography ==
List of film credits
Year	Title	Role	Notes
2006	Last Slaughter	Angela	
2006	Vaccine	Natasha	
2007	Gloss	Model	
2008	The Inhabited Island	Rada Gaal	Part 1
2009	The Inhabited island: Skirmish	Rada Gaal	Part 2
2010	Zaitsev, Burn! History Showman	leading	
2011	Rose Valley	Maya	
2011	Raspoutine	Dora	
2012	Atomic Ivan	Tanya	
2012	Kokoko	Natasha	
2013	A Good Day to Die Hard	Irina	Billed as "Yulia Snigir"
2013	Polar Flight	Lyuda	
2014	Freezer	Alisa	
2015	The Land of Oz	Fifa	
2015	About Love	Liza	
2017	Blockbuster (ru)	Lena Vanina	
2019	The End of the Season (ru)	Vera	
2021	The Execution	Vera	
2022	Petrópolis	Anna	
2022	Winter Season	Katya	
2024	The Master and Margarita	Margarita	
	Devil's Fruit		Post-production

List of television credits
Year	Title	Role
2010	In the Forests and Mountains	Maria Gavrilovna Zaletova
2010	Doctor Tyrsa	Lisa
2010	Sky on Fire	Lisa Voronina
2011	Counterplay	Irina Kurakina
2011	I Will Never Forget You	Katya Alkovich
2014	What Begins Motherland	Natalya
2015	The Seventh Rune	Tatiana Ikonnikova
2015	Catherine the Great	Catherine II
2017	The Road to Calvary	Ekaterina Smokovnikova
2018	Bloody Lady	Saltychikha
2020	The New Pope	Ewa Novak
2020	Passengers	Svetlana
2020	Just Imagine Things We Know	Terletskaya
2020	A Good Man (ru)	Evgenia Klyuchevskaya
2024	Crime and Punishment	Marfa Petrovna
