= Sergey Mokritskiy =

Russian film director and cinematographer

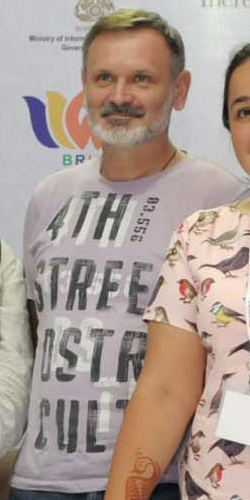
- Born: Sergey Evgenievich Mokritskiy; February 18, 1961 (age 64); Zhytomyr Oblast, Soviet Union (now Ukraine)
- Citizenship: Russian Federation
- Occupations: film director, cinematographer

Sergey Evgenievich Mokritskiy (Russian: Сергей Евгеньевич Мокрицкий, born February 18, 1961) is a Russian film director and cinematographer of Ukrainian origin.

== Filmography ==
=== As director ===
- The Four Ages of Love (2008)
- Cherchill (2009)
- Teacher's Day (2012)
- Battle for Sevastopol (2015)
- I Am a Teacher (2016)
- A Rough Draft (2018)
- First Oscar (2022)

=== As cinematographer ===
- The Smell of Autumn (1993)
- All the Things We Dreamt of for So Long (1997)
- Killer's Diary (2003)
- Parallel Voices (2005)
- Shift (2006)
- Playing the Victim (2006)
- Anna German. Echo of Love (2011)
- My Dad Baryshnikov (2011)
- Afganistan. Point of no Return (2012)
- Without Witnesses (2012)
- Sex, Coffee, Cigarettes (2014)
- I Am a Teacher (2016)

=== As scriptwriter ===
- Teacher's Day (2012)
- Battle for Sevastopol (2015)
- A Rough Draft (2018)
