= Winter Season =

- Directed by: Svetlana Ustinova
- Written by: Igor Poplaukhin; Svetlana Ustinova
- Produced by: Ilya Stewart; Murad Osmann; Pavel Burya; Elizaveta Chalenko; Ilya Dzhincharadze; Natalya Smirnova
- Starring: Yuliya Snigir; Yevgenia Dobrovolskaya; Yekarina Varnava; Semyon Serzin; Aleksandr Lykov; Artur Vakha; Aleksandra Babaskina; Polina Raykina
- Cinematography: Aleksandr Simonov
- Edited by: Darya Charusha
- Production companies: Kinoprime Foundation; Hype Film; Ministry of Culture
- Distributed by: Capella Film
- Release date: November 24, 2022 (Russia)
- Running time: 82 minutes
- Country: Russia
- Language: Russian

Winter Season (Russian: Время года зима, romanized: Vremya goda zima, lit. 'Winter Time') is a 2022 Russian drama film directed by Svetlana Ustinova. The main characters of the film were played by Yuliya Snigir and Yevgenia Dobrovolskaya.

It is scheduled to be theatrically released on November 24, 2022, by Capella Film.

== Plot ==
Katya and her mother have a tense relationship. And suddenly Katya finds out that her mother has suddenly disappeared. After Katya was told the reason for the disappearance of her mother, Katya will have to reunite with her mother and discover a lot of new things about her and about herself.

== Cast ==
- Yuliya Snigir as Katya
  - Sofya Petrova as Katya, a little girl
- Yevgenia Dobrovolskaya as Katya's mother
- Yekarina Varnava as Ilza
- Semyon Serzin as Stasik
- Aleksandr Lykov as Georgy
- Artur Vakha as Nikolay
- Aleksandra Babaskina as Maya
- Polina Raykina as Tamara

== Production ==
The filming of the film was started by Hype Film in the spring of 2021 and took place in Saint Petersburg. The film was directed by Svetlana Ustinova, making her debut in this role. The script, written by Igor Poplaukhin, is partly based on the life of the actress herself.
