= Pavel Chukhray =

Russian screenwriter and film director

Pavel Grigoryevich Chukhray (Russian: Па́вел Григо́рьевич Чухра́й; born 14 October 1946) is a Soviet and Russian film director and screenwriter. He is the son of the prominent Russian film director Grigory Chukhray.

He is best known for his film The Thief (1997), which was nominated for a Golden Globe Award and an Academy Award for Best Foreign Language Film^{[}^{1]} and won the Nika Award for Best Picture and Best Directing. He is a People's Artist of Russia. He has been nominated and won numerous international prizes in Russia, Europe and the United States, including the Venice Film Festival.

Steven Spielberg invited Pavel Chukhray to participate in his project: “Broken Silence” (2002), an international documentary mini-series about the Holocaust. The series consists of five foreign-language films featuring testimonies from Argentina, the Czech Republic, Hungary, Poland, and Russia and directed by distinguished filmmakers from each of these countries. Pavel Chukhray directed the segment "Children from the Abyss," detailing the experience of Holocaust survivors and their resistance, betrayal, rescue, and the desire for revenge in this Russian-language documentary. The film series was subtitled into 11 languages (including English) and has aired on television in 18 countries worldwide.

In 2007, Chukhray adapted a novel by Nikolai Gogol to film, resulting in a production called The Russian Game, about an Italian card sharper who is hounded by creditors and travels to Russia to hustle some quick money. On his way, he meets a group of Russian gamblers that sympathize with his situation and agree to collaborate with him.

== Early life ==
Pavel Grigoryevich Chukhray was born in Bykovo, Ramensky district, Moscow Oblast. His mother was a teacher—she taught Russian language and Literature. His father was the film director Grigory Chukhray. When Pavel was seven, his father began working at Dovzhenko Film Studios, and the family moved to Kiev. He grew up surrounded by family friends who were talented film makers, including Mark Donskoy, and the young and not yet well-known Sergei Parajanov, Aleksandr Alov, and Vladimir Naumov. When he was nine, Chukhray and his family moved to Moscow. At the age of 16, he began working for the Russian film studio Mosfilm. In 1964, he went to VGIK (All-Union State Institute of Cinematography) studying to become a cinematographer. He continued on to directing, receiving his diploma in 1974.

Chukray's directorial debut was You Should Sometimes Remember (1977), starring Nikolai Kryuchkov. He wrote and directed his second film, People in the Ocean (1980), which was a popular and critical success and won him many awards in Russia, including the Dovzhenko Award. His third film, A Canary Cage (1983), which he both wrote and directed played at the Cannes Film Festival and elsewhere. His eighth film, The Thief (1997), brought him success internationally. It was one of the top three box office hits in Russia, and was nominated internationally for many awards including an Oscar and a Golden Globe.

== Work ==
In 2007 he adapted and directed the play The Gamblers by writer Nikolai Gogol, which was renamed The Russian Game.

== Personal life ==
Pavel Grigoryevich Chukhray's first wife is the actress Alyona Chukhray. His second wife is the screenwriter Maria Zvereva. He has two daughters and four grandchildren.

His daughter Anastasia is married to the businessman Alexey M. Reznikovich.

== Filmography ==
Year	Film	Director	Writer
2017	Baltic Tango (Холодное танго)	x	x
2010	The Test (Испытание)		x
2009	Head on the Block (Голова на плахе)		x
2007	The Russian Game (Русская игра)	x	x
2004	A Driver for Vera (Водитель для Веры)	x	x
1997	The Thief (Вор)	x	x
1992	Key (Ключ) (Television)	x	x
1988	It Happened Last Summer (Это было прошлым летом)		x
1987	Remember Me Like This (Запомните меня такой) (Television)	x	
1986	Zina-Zinulya (Зина-Зинуля)	x	
1983	A Canary Cage (Клетка для канареек)	x	x
1980	People in the Ocean (Люди в океане)	x	x
1977	You Should Sometimes Remember (Ты иногда вспоминай)	x	

Documentaries:

Year	Film
2001	Broken Silence - Children from the Abyss
1993	The Hawk (Ястреб)
