= Breathe Easy (film) =

- Directed by: Sergei Bodrov
- Written by: Sergei Bodrov
- Produced by: Sergei Selyanov
- Starring: Evgeniy Tkachuk; Polina Agureeva; Polina Pushkaruk
- Cinematography: Konstantin Esadze
- Edited by: Igor Litoninsky
- Production companies: CTB Film Company; Studio Globus; Ministry of Culture
- Distributed by: Nashe Kino (English: Our Cinema)
- Release date: May 12, 2022
- Running time: 89 min.
- Country: Russia
- Language: Russian

Breathe Easy (Russian: Дышите свободно, romanized: Dyshite svobodno) is a 2022 Russian romantic drama film directed by Sergei Bodrov, who is also the film's writer and producer. It was theatrically released on May 12, 2022.

== Plot ==
The film is about a man named Ilya who stutters and decides to enroll in Dr. Cherkasova's course in the hope that she will help him. As a result, he finds new friends and a girlfriend.

== Cast ==
- Evgeniy Tkachuk as Ilya
- Polina Agureeva as doctor Cherkasova
- Polina Pushkaruk as Vera
- Ilya Del as Gena
- Mikhail Troynik as Pushkov
- Kristii Schneider as Iya

== Production ==
Sergei Bodrov wanted to make a movie about the fight against stuttering back in the 90s, but several times he postponed the implementation of this idea. The production of the picture was carried out by the CTB Film Company, headed by Sergei Selyanov. The project was developed with the support of the Ministry of Culture of the Russian Federation.
