= A Portrait of a Stranger =

Portrait of a Stranger
- Directed by: Sergey Osipyan
- Written by: Kseniya Kiyashko; Aleksandr Lungin; Sergey Osipyan
- Produced by: Violetta Krechetova; Sergey Osipyan; Artem Vasilyev
- Starring: Yuri Butorin; Kirill Pirogov; Kseniya Putepova; Galina Tyunina; Polina Kutepova; Madlen Dzhabrailova; Nikita Tyunin
- Cinematography: Vsevolod Kaptur
- Music by: Yevgeni Shteinberg
- Production company: Address Film
- Distributed by: SPPR
- Release dates: September 2021 (Kinotavr); January 1, 2022 (Russia)
- Running time: 107 minutes
- Country: Russia
- Language: Russian

A Portrait of a Stranger (Russian: Портрет незнакомца) is a 2021 Russian drama film directed by Sergey Osipyan. It is scheduled to be theatrically released on January 1, 2022.

== Plot ==
The film is set in Moscow in 1974. At its center is Oleg, a weary-looking but charming actor with a deep voice, who works in radio. His last source of income—a radio play in which he portrays a Soviet spy—is suddenly canceled, and his wife kicks him out of the house. These setbacks, along with an encounter with Nikolaev, a celebrated writer and living classic, draw Oleg into a whirlwind of surreal events.

== Cast ==
- Yuri Butorin as Oleg
- Kirill Pirogov as Nikolayev
- Kseniya Putepova as Inga
- Galina Tyunina as Peresvetova
- Polina Kutepova as Tamara
- Madlen Dzhabrailova as Nelli
- Nikita Tyunin as Lavrentyev

== Awards and nominations ==
- 2021 Golden Unicorn Awards: nominated for Best Film award.
