= Sergey Osipyan =

Russian film director, screenwriter and producer (born 1966)

- Born: Sergey Yuryevich Osipyan; September 15, 1966 (age 59); Moscow, Soviet Union
- Citizenship: Russian Federation
- Occupations: film director, screenwriter, producer

Sergey Osipyan (Russian: Сергей Юрьевич Осипьян; born September 15, 1966) is a Russian film director, screenwriter and producer.

== Biography ==
Sergey was born on September 15, 1966. He studied at the Higher Courses for Scriptwriters and Directors in the workshop of Alexander Kaidanovsky.

== Filmography ==
- Yavleniye prirody (2010)
- Guys from Mars (2011)
- Otkroveniya (2019)
- Portrait of a Stranger (2021)
