= Kirill Pirogov =

Russian composer

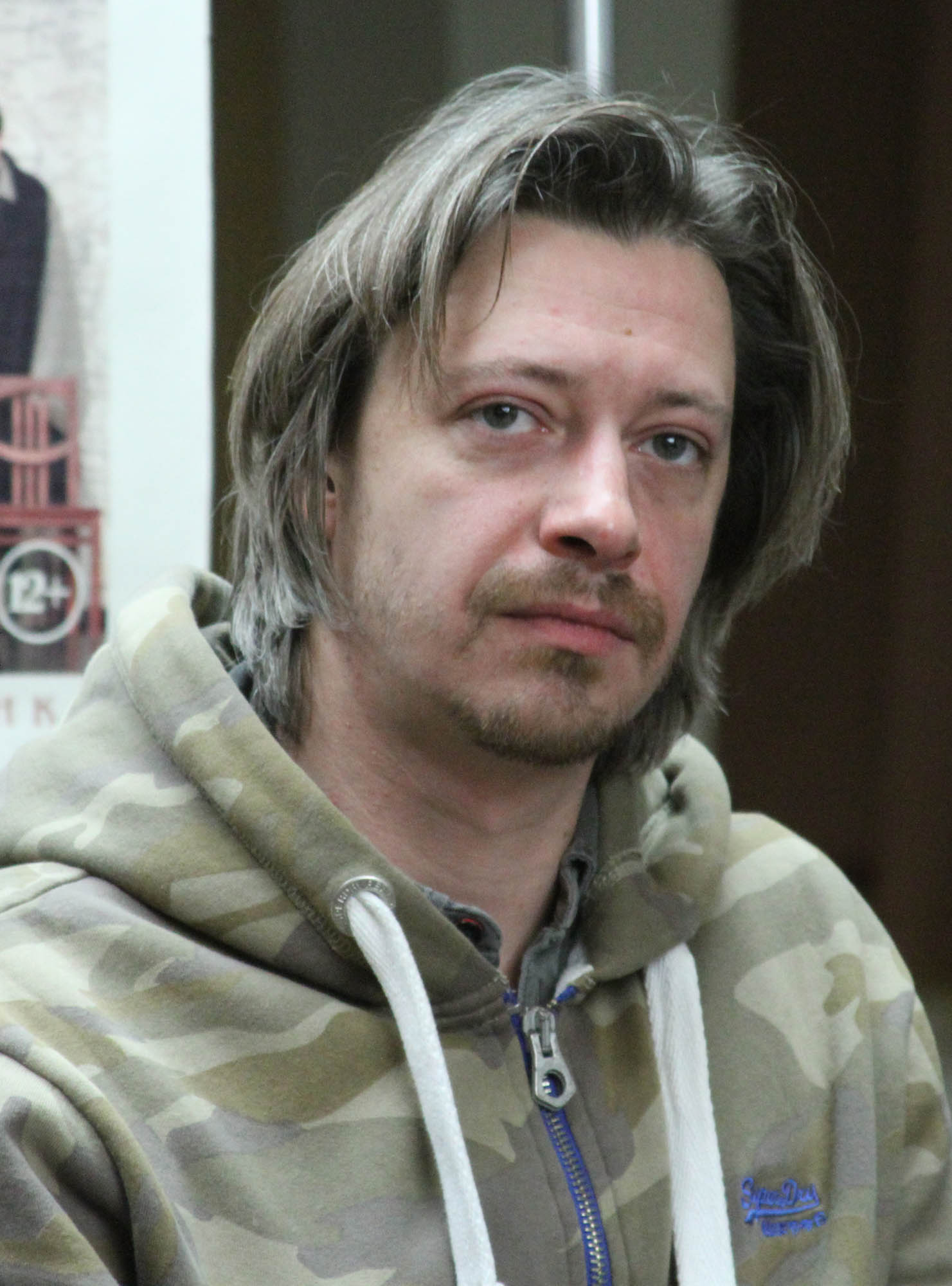
- Pirogov actor of the theater, 2014.
- Born: 4 September 1973 (age 52); Tehran, Iran
- Occupations: Actor, composer
- Years active: 1995-present

Kirill Alfredovich Pirogov (Russian: Кирилл Альфредович Пирогов; born 4 September 1973) is a Russian film and theatre actor and composer. He has appeared in more than twenty films since 1995. In 2005 he was made an Honoured Artist of the Russian Federation.

== Biography ==
Pirogov was born in Tehran, Iran, to a Russian family. His father worked in the field of foreign trade, engaged in the export and import of heavy road and construction equipment.

Pirogov studied in a theatre studio under the leadership of Sergei Kazarnovsky and also graduated from music school. His parents saw a future for him in a more serious profession, wanting their son to study at university. However, the decision was already made, and in 1994 Pirogov graduated from the Boris Shchukin Theatre Institute school (the course of Vladimir Ivanov). Then he received an offer to play in the theatre "Workshop of Peter Fomenko" (and was the first who was taken to the theatre "from the side").

== Selected filmography ==
Year	Title	Role	Notes
1995	Heads and Tails	Oleg Chagin	
2000	Brother 2	Ilya Setevoy	
2001	Sisters	bandit	
2002	Azazel	Nikolai Akhtyrtsev	
2005	Dead Man's Bluff	Executioner	
2006	Piter FM	Gleb	
2009	Dark Planet	Svyokor	
2017	Trotsky	Ivan Ilyin	
2018	McMafia	Ilya Fedorov	
2020	The Courier	Gribanov	
2021	Portrait of a Stranger	Nikolayev	
