= Non-Orphanage =

- Directed by: Mikhail Raskhodnikov
- Written by: Andrey Petrushin; Mikhail Raskhodnikov; Darya Bogadelina
- Produced by: Anastasiya Akopyan; Alexandr Kalushkin; Konstantin Yelkin
- Starring: Ivan Okhlobystin; Alexandr Panin; Polina Vataga; Irina Rozanova; Yekaterina Solomatina; Alexandra Skachkova; Oleg Vasilkov; Marina Kleshyova
- Cinematography: Nikolai Korniyenko
- Music by: Andrey Kliminov
- Distributed by: Russian World Vision
- Release date: September 15, 2022
- Country: Russia
- Language: Russian

Non-Orphanage, also known as Non-Children’s Community (Russian: Недетский дом, romanized: Nedetsky dom) is a 2022 Russian teen drama film directed by Mikhail Raskhodnikov. It was theatrically released on September 15, 2022.

== Plot ==
The film takes place in an orphanage visited by the new director Andrei Must together with a new pupil named Inna, who quickly adapts to a new environment filled with children who are dissatisfied with local conditions and are preparing a riot to show the educators who is the boss here.

== Cast ==
- Ivan Okhlobystin as Andrei Must
- Alexandr Panin as Litva
- Polina Vataga as Inna
- Irina Rozanova as a psychologist
- Yekaterina Solomatina as deputy director
- Alexandra Skachkova as a teacher
- Oleg Vasilkov as a district police officer
- Marina Kleshyova a nurse
- Arsen Sukhovsky as Kondrat
- Iosif Medvedev as Molchun
