= Irina Rozanova =

Russian actress

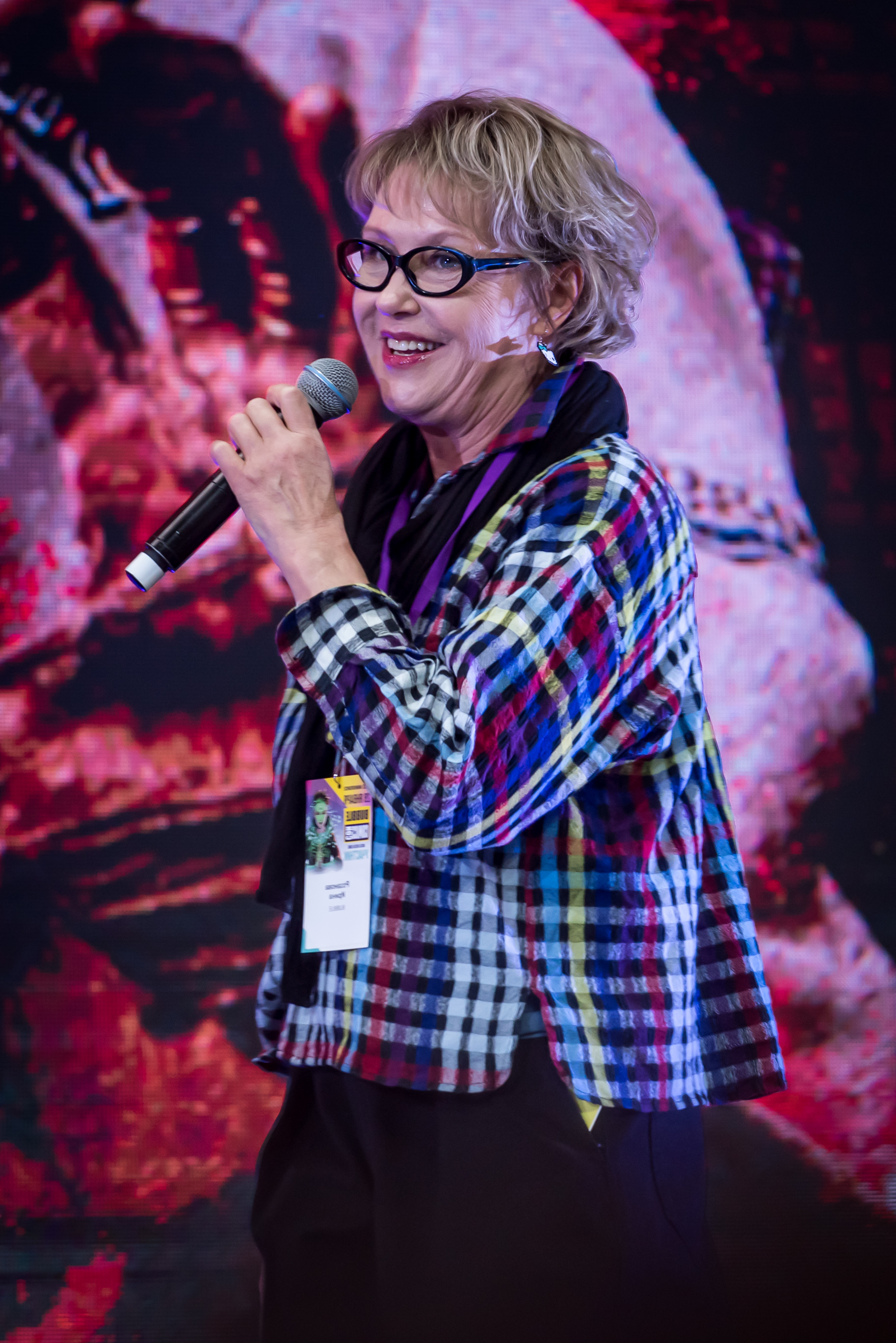
- Irina Rozanova in 2023
- Born: Irina Yurievna Rozanova; 22 July 1961 (age 65); Penza, Russian SFSR, USSR
- Occupation: Actress
- Years active: 1985–present

Irina Yurievna Rozanova (Russian: Ири́на Ю́рьевна Роза́нова; born 22 July 1961) is a Russian actress. She has appeared in more than 80 films and television shows since 1985. In 2008 she was a member of the jury at the 30th Moscow International Film Festival.

== Biography ==
Rozanova was born in Penza on 22 July 1961. In early 1962 Irina's family moved to Ryazan. Her parents are actors Yuri Rozanov and Zoya Belova.

== Awards ==
- Meritorious Artist of Russia (1995)
- Nika Award (2005; for Best Supporting Actress)
- People's Artist of Russia (2007)
- Golden Eagle Award (2013; for Best TV Actress)

== Selected filmography ==
- Once Lied (1987) as Tanya
- Where is the Nophelet? (1988) as Valentina
- The Servant (1989) as Maria
- Intergirl (1989) as Sima Gulliver
- Cloud-Paradise (1990) as Valya, Fedya's wife
- I Hope for You (1992) as Ira
- Encore, Once More Encore! (1992) as Lyuba Antipova
- Zone of Lyube (1994) as girlfriend
- The Rifleman of the Voroshilov Regiment (1999) as Katya's Mother
- Mechanical Suite (2001) as Olga
- Lines of Fate (2003) as Katerina Vershinina
- Gloss (2007) as Marina Yurievna
- Hipsters (2008) as Polza's Mother
- Peter the Great: The Testament (2011) as Catherine I of Russia
- Two Days (2011) as Larisa Petrovna
- Love (2021) as Oleg's mother
- Tell Her (2021) as Valya
- Little Red Riding Hood (2022) as granny
- Non-Orphanage (2022) as psychologist
- Here's to You and Us! (2023) as Angelina
