= Like a Man (film) =

2022 Russian film

- Directed by: Maksim Kulagin
- Written by: Densi Kulagin
- Produced by: Mikhail Marizov; Anton Lapenko; Andrey Dementyev
- Starring: Anton Lapenko; Ekaterina Shcherbakova; Evgeniya Sinitskaya; Vladimir Gorislavets; Anastasiya Chuyeva
- Cinematography: Dmitry Tskhay
- Distributed by: Central Partnership
- Release date: November 10, 2022
- Running time: 105 minutes
- Country: Russia
- Language: Russian

Like a Man (Russian: По-мужски, romanized: Po-muzhski) is a 2022 Russian thriller drama film directed by Maksim Kulagin. It stars Anton Lapenko. It was theatrically released on November 10, 2022, by Central Partnership.

== Plot ==
The film tells about a 35-year-old man named Gleb, who has everything he needs to be happy: a beautiful wife, a successful business and a luxurious country house. But as a result of a showdown with a drunken neighbor who hit his wife, his life changes dramatically.

== Cast ==
- Anton Lapenko as Gleb
- Ekaterina Shcherbakova as Polina
- Evgeniya Sinitskaya as Rita
- Vladimir Gorislavets as Kostya
- Anastasiya Chuyeva as Vera
- Polina Sinilnikova as Tanya
- Olga Khokhlova
- Sergey Vasin as Artur
- Anton Artemyev
- Konstantin Umrikhin as basketball player
