= Cryptocurrency in Nigeria =

Cryptocurrency in Nigeria describes the extent of cryptocurrency use, social acceptance and regulation in Nigeria. Nigerians are one of the major global users of cryptocurrencies.

In 2017, the Central Bank of Nigeria instructed commercial banks to desist from cryptocurrency transactions. In 2025, the Investments and Securities Act (2025) was enacted, regulating cryptocurrency, and recognizing digital assets as financial securities in Nigeria.

== Prevalence ==
According to a 2020 online survey, 32% of participating Nigerians used cryptocurrencies. With a total cryptocurrency transaction volume amounting to $400M, Nigeria ranks third after the United States and Russia according to 2020 estimates. The most traded pair is Bitcoin/Naira, and other cryptocurrencies popular in Nigeria include Dash and Ripple. Between July 2023 and June 2024, Nigeria received approximately $59 billion in crypto-asset value and ranked second globally on the 2024 Global Crypto Adoption Index.

At least as of late 2020, cryptocurrencies in Nigeria are a parallel and smaller system to the Naira, the official currency. Researchers at the Central Bank of Nigeria suggest that rather than threatening the importance of the Naira,

"Cryptocurrencies can have a positive effect by acting as a disciplining device to central banks. Currency competition can succeed in calming inflation and preventing the sort of manipulation of interest rates and prices to which governments have historically been prone. This is a partial vindication of Hayek (1976), who argued in favour of breaking the state monopoly on money as a way to ensure the stability of the official currency[sic]."

In February 2021, the Central Bank of Nigeria issued directives restricting all financial institutions from processing cryptocurrency transactions, barring cryptocurrency exchanges from the traditional banking system.

In February 2024, the Africa Stablecoin Consortium (ASC), composed of Nigerian financial institutions, fintech, and blockchain experts, launched a compliant Nigeria Naira (cNGN) stablecoin. By that December, Nigerians owned 73% of the cryptocurrency in Africa. In 2025, in addition to the Naira-fixed cNGN stablecoin issued by WrappedCBDC, at least 27 cryptocurrency companies and startups operate in Nigeria, including Zone, Nestcoin, Wirepay, Breet, Busha, Quidax, and Yellowcard .

The Securities and Exchange Commission, under the Nigeria Capital Market Institute (NCMI), and Kenya School of Government (KSG) partnered with Busha to design a cryptocurrency study programme, "Digital Assets Innovation, Industry, Regulation and Compliance (DAIIRC)", for leaders of financial institution, and other decision-makers, which is to be developed by Cambridge Enterprise of Cambridge University.

=== Perception ===
Bitcoin was initially looked upon with scepticism and associated with Ponzi schemes such as Bitconnect, OneCoin, and Mavrodi Mudial Moneybox (MMM). Scams were commonplace in Nigeria, with Bitcoin often used for the victims of the scams to make payments.

== Factors that promote use ==
The official exchange rate in Nigeria of the Naira to foreign currencies is set by the Nigerian Central Bank, and thus not by forex markets. The central bank tends to devalue the Naira against other currencies. This devaluation is a factor that causes Nigerians to look elsewhere to preserve the value of the money they earn. In 2020 the Central Bank of Nigeria decreased the value of the Naira by 24%.

Transferring money from and to Nigeria is very costly using the traditional banking system, and cryptocurrency provides an alternative to the high fees experienced there.

Following the freezing of bank accounts for cryptocurrency-related activities, many Nigerians have said they will continue to use cryptocurrencies where they can and that they will switch to using peer-to-peer transactions. These bypass traditional banks entirely because cryptocurrencies are sent from one person decentralised wallet to another.

Similarly, people have had their bank accounts blocked by authorities for participation in the End SARS anti-police brutality protests, leading to increased use of digital currencies with Bitcoin trending on Twitter at the time of the protests.

== Legality ==
The Central Bank of Nigeria Act 2007 gives the central bank, Central Bank of Nigeria (CBN) the right to issue Nigeria's legal tender which is legally prescribed to be the Naira. The act also gives the CBN the sole right to issue Naira and the right to determine the exchange rate of Naira to other fiat currencies. At the time the laws were passed, cryptocurrencies did not exist and thus there is no legal framework addressing cryptocurrencies, nor can they be considered legal tender according to existing laws.

In 2016, the Nigeria Deposit Insurance Commission (NDIC) and the CBN set up a commission to look into Bitcoin after it became a relevant topic following the shutdown of the Ponzi scheme, Mavrodi Mudial Moneybox (MMM) that was active in Nigeria. MMM had announced it would be adopting Bitcoin.

In January 2017, the Nigerian Securities and Exchange Commission (SEC) issued a warning that no companies or entities involved with cryptocurrencies are recognised or authorised and that there are no protections or insurances against financial losses involving cryptocurrencies. The CBN issued banks with the instruction that they ensure that they do not hold, transact, or in any way use virtual currencies and that customers of those banks that are virtual currency exchanges ensure that they have anti–money laundering regulations in place and otherwise terminate their relationship with those customers and report they are suspicious transactions to the Nigerian Financial Intelligence Unit.

In 2017, the CBN banned banks from facilitating transactions that were cryptocurrency-related, however, this ban was not heavily enforced. According to members of the research department at the Central Bank of Nigeria, the warnings by the CBN and SEC are designed more as a means to educate the citizens of Nigeria about cryptocurrencies and make sure that they understand that cryptocurrencies are not guaranteed by the state unlike the CBN issued Naira, which is.

In its 7 February 2021 statement, the CBN cited its need to protect the public from threats by unregulated activities that are potential areas of illegal operations. Nigerians subsequently reported having their bank accounts frozen due to being involved with cryptocurrencies. Moreover, the CBN and SEC tried to place a ban on cryptocurrencies.

Cryptocurrency-related companies are not forbidden in Nigeria. The legal status of cryptocurrencies in Nigeria is ambiguous, unlike other countries where there is a clear ban.

According to a study by price tracker CoinGecko, Nigeria became more interested in cryptocurrencies than any other country in Africa. Nigeria scored 371 in the study that looked at Google Trends data for six searches such as "buy crypto" or "invest in crypto".

In May 2024, the Nigerian government announced a new regulatory framework that aims to delist the Nigerian naira from peer-to-peer cryptocurrency exchanges. Starting in 2026, profits from individual cryptocurrency transactions in Nigeria will be taxed at a maximum rate of 25%. Mariblock also reports that Virtual asset service providers (VASPs) are liable to pay a 30% corporate income tax on profits from their operations, mostly through transaction fees. Under the new tax regime, locally registered crypto exchanges must report user transactions or risk severe penalties, including the loss of their operating licenses.

On March 25, 2025, the Investments and Securities Act (2025) was signed into Nigerian law, replacing the 2007 version. The new Act regulates cryptocurrencies while recognizing digital assets as financial securities.

On 3 August 2026, the Nigeria Revenue Service published its first formal tax framework for virtual assets, the Guidelines on the Taxation of Virtual Assets, setting out reporting, record-keeping and compliance obligations for VASPs and peer-to-peer marketplace operators, and specifying that taxable income from crypto activity, including trading gains, mining rewards, staking income, and DeFi rewards, is to be determined using the fair market value of the asset on the date of each transaction, under the Nigeria Tax Act 2025 and the Nigeria Tax Administration Act 2025.

== Impact ==
In addition to discussing the impact on Monetary and Fiscal Policy, researchers at the CBN suggest that cryptocurrencies could have a positive effect on the agricultural and education sectors in Nigeria. In the agricultural sector, they suggest that blockchains have a significant potential to enhance access to finance by connecting the technology to their business model which can remedy food security issues. In the education sector, they see cryptocurrencies as being an opportunity as there is much to learn about them and by incorporation of cryptocurrency into education it will be overall beneficial to the development of the country.
