= Angel Tang =

- Born: October 8, 1986 (age 38); Shanghai, China
- Occupation(s): TV personality, model, attorney

Angel Tang (simplified Chinese: 唐锡毅; traditional Chinese: 唐錫毅; pinyin: Táng Xíyì) is a New York City-based television personality and model. She was formerly seen as one of the four Chinese-American VJs on the now cancelled MTV spin-off channel MTV Chi, the first television channel dedicated to Chinese-Americans. Tang hosted the "Top Ten Chi Countdown" that counted down the week's most voted music videos among other shows.

Angel is currently a TV journalist for Ming Jing News (simplified Chinese: 明镜新闻; traditional Chinese: 明鏡新聞; pinyin: Ming Jing) is a New York-based Chinese-language news website owned by Mirror Media Group. Tang also stars in the "Shi Shen Me Dao Li" 是什么道理 (What's the Reason") music video by SIRIS, the only western band in the world performing and composing their own original English and Chinese language songs.

Prior to her engagement as a VJ, Tang was a print model for Cosmopolitan, Target, Dell, Microsoft, United Colors of Benetton, Lord & Taylor, Zappos, Vis-A-Vis Magazine, Royal Apparel, and the Dirty by Anthony DeFranco haircare line, among others. Tang was an editorial Model for Time, Cosmopolitan, Elle, Cosmopolitan, Allure, and her other clients include: Tiffany & Co, Shiseido, MAC Cosmetics, Dupont, Nivea, Procter & Gamble. Angel Tang was also one of the ten finalists in the models.com/Wilhelmina Models Model Search 2005.

Tang was born in Shanghai, China but raised in New York City.

== MTV Chi ==
MTV Chi was a spin-off network from MTV that was targeted towards Chinese Americans. The network featured various styles of music such as Mandarin rock, Cantopop and Chinese American rap. It broadcast in English and featured a mix of original programming with the best of MTV's International programming. Tang was one of the VJs on MTV Chi and hosted the Top Ten Chi Countdown a show that allowed people to vote for their favorite music videos of the week. She also hosted MTV Chi Rocks, the first concert celebrating young Chinese Americans, held in San Gabriel, CA. The concert featured the hottest names in Asian American music including Frequency5, Vienna Teng, SIRIS, Burning Tree Project, Kaila Yu, Adrienne Lau, Putnam Hall, and Far East Movement. Headlining the blowout event was Jin the Emcee and hip hop group Jeff and Machi.

The music videos aired were of both Chinese and English. MTV Chi launched on December 6, 2005 and ceased broadcasting on April 30, 2007.
