= Mytishchi constituency =

Russian legislative constituency

Mytishchi single-member constituency
- Constituency of the Russian State Duma

- Constituency boundaries since 2026
- Deputy: Alexander Legkov; United Russia
- Federal subject: Moscow Oblast
- Districts: Dolgoprudny, Korolyov, Mytishchi
- Voters: 471,355 (2026)

The Mytishchi constituency (No.123 (Note: No.109 in 1993-1995 and 2003-2007, No.108 in 1995-2003)) is a Russian legislative constituency in Moscow Oblast. The constituency covers inner northern suburbs of Moscow, including the cities Dolgoprudny, Korolyov and Mytishchi.

The constituency has been represented since 2026 by United Russia deputy Alexander Legkov, former Member of Moscow Oblast Duma and retired professional cross-country skier.

== Boundaries ==
1993–1995: Dolgoprudny, Khimki, Khimkinsky District, Lobnya, Mytishchi, Mytishchinsky District, Solnechnogorsk, Solnechnogorsky District
The constituency covered northern suburbs of Moscow, including the cities Dolgoprudny, Khimki, Lobnya, Mytishchi and Solnechnogorsk.

1995–2007: Dolgoprudny, Korolyov, Lobnya, Mytishchinsky District, Solnechnogorsky District, Yubileyny
The constituency was significantly altered following the 1995 redistricting, losing Khimki and Khimkinsky District to Istra constituency. This seat instead gained Korolyov (Kaliningrad) and Yubileyny from the dissolved Shchyolkovo constituency.

2026–present: Dolgoprudny, Korolyov, Mytishchi
After the 2025 redistricting Moscow Oblast gained 12th district, which prompted the reinstating of Mytishchi constituency. The constituency was created in northern Moscow suburbs from parts of Balashikha (Mytishchi), Dmitrov (Dolgoprudny) and Sergiyev Posad (Korolyov) constituencies.

== Members elected ==
Election	Member	Party
1993	Andrey Aizderdzis (Note: killed in April 1994)	Independent
1994	Sergey Mavrodi (Note: expelled in October 1995)	Independent
1995	Sergey Yushenkov	Democratic Choice of Russia – United Democrats
1999	A by-election was scheduled after Against all line received the most votes	
2000	Arkady Baskayev	Independent
2003	Arkady Baskayev	People's Party
2007	Proportional representation - no election by constituency	
2011	Proportional representation - no election by constituency	
2016	Constituency eliminated	
2021	Constituency eliminated	
2026	Alexander Legkov	United Russia

== Election results ==
=== 1993 ===
==== Declared candidates ====
- Pyotr Agilin (APR), agricultural construction executive
- Andrey Aizderdzis (Independent), banker, businessman
- Anatoly Bezuglov (Independent), law firm president
- Vladislav Bykov (Independent), tekhnikum director
- Vladislav Gorokhov (Independent), former People's Deputy of the Soviet Union (1989–1991), landscaping architect
- German Ivantsov (Civic Union), former Member of Moscow City Council of People's Deputies (1990–1993), nonprofit chairman
- Valery Kvartalnov (Independent), rector of Russian International Academy of Tourism
- Vyacheslav Pakharev (CPRF), former Member of Moscow Oblast Council of People's Deputies (1990–1993), former First Secretary of the CPSU Krasnogorsk City Committee (1986–1991)
- Sergey Sarenkov (Independent), businessman
- Antonina Savchenko (Independent), Metrowagonmash executive
- Fyodor Sotnikov (Independent), polymer plant director
- Larisa Vlasova (Independent), associate professor
- Kirill Yankov (Independent), former Member of Moscow Oblast Council of People's Deputies (1990–1993)
- Dmitry Yuryev (Independent), journalist
- Igor Zadvornov (RDDR), research program head
- Stanislav Zarichansky (LDPR), party official

==== Withdrawn candidates ====
- Igor Obukhov (Choice of Russia), businessman

==== Results ====
Summary of the 12 December 1993 Russian legislative election in the Mytishchi constituency
Candidate	Party	Votes	%
Andrey Aizderdzis	Independent	26,815	9.23%
Antonina Savchenko	Independent	24,804	8.53%
Stanislav Zarichansky	Liberal Democratic Party	21,273	7.32%
Fyodor Sotnikov	Independent	19,536	6.72%
Anatoly Bezuglov	Independent	17,905	6.16%
Kirill Yankov	Independent	17,889	6.16%
Vladislav Bykov	Independent	15,478	5.33%
Vladislav Gorokhov	Independent	12,421	4.27%
Igor Zadvornov	Russian Democratic Reform Movement	11,767	4.05%
Larisa Vlasova	Independent	10,921	3.76%
Dmitry Yuryev	Independent	9,688	3.33%
Sergey Sarenkov	Independent	6,644	2.29%
Vyacheslav Pakharev	Communist Party	6,149	2.12%
Valery Kvartalnov	Independent	4,704	1.62%
Pyotr Agilin	Agrarian Party	4,401	1.51%
German Ivantsov	Civic Union	4,145	1.43%
against all		57,669	19.84%
Total		290,640	100%

=== 1994 ===
==== Declared candidates ====
- Leonid Barashkov (Independent), transportation businessman
- Konstantin Borovoy (PES), businessman, chairman of the Party of Economic Freedom (1992–present)
- Aleksandr Fedorov (RNE), deputy chairman of the Russian National Unity
- Yury Genenko (Independent), businessman
- Aleksandr Golovashchenko (Independent), Mytishchi administration official
- Aleksandr Maksimov (RKhDS)
- Sergey Mavrodi (Independent), imprisoned president and founder of MMM
- Georgy Semin (Independent)
- Andrey Sidelnikov (Independent), former advisor to Alexander Rutskoy, businessman
- Sergey Sigarev (Independent), nonprofit president
- Olga Volkova (PRES)
- Aleksandr Zharov (Independent), Head of Solnechnogorsky District (1985–present)

==== Results ====
Summary of the 30 October 1994 by-election in the Mytishchi constituency
Candidate	Party	Votes	%
Sergey Mavrodi	Independent	–	27.84%
Aleksandr Zharov	Independent	–	14.54%
Aleksandr Fedorov	Russian National Unity	–	5.92%
Leonid Barashkov	Independent	–	–
Konstantin Borovoy	Party of Economic Freedom	–	–
Yury Genenko	Independent	–	–
Aleksandr Golovashchenko	Independent	–	–
Aleksandr Maksimov	Russian Christian Democratic Union	–	–
Georgy Semin	Independent	–	–
Andrey Sidelnikov	Independent	–	–
Sergey Sigarev	Independent	–	–
Olga Volkova	Party of Russian Unity and Accord	–	–
Total		-	100%

=== 1995 ===
==== Declared candidates ====
- Aleksandr Aleksandrov (Independent), retired cosmonaut, Hero of the Soviet Union (1983, 1987)
- Aleksandr Fedorov (Russian Party), chief designer at Dolgoprudnenskoe Scientific Production Plant
- Vladislav Gorokhov (Our Future), former People's Deputy of the Soviet Union (1989–1991), 1993 candidate for this seat
- Vladimir Korobeynikov (Zemsky Sobor), institute director
- Boris Nadezhdin (Independent), Member of Dolgoprudny City Council (1993–present), nonprofit executive (previously ran as PRES candidate)
- Dmitry Pavlov (Independent), retirement fund president
- Sergey Plevako (PST), navigator trainer at Aeroflot
- Vladimir Ponomaryov (Forward, Russia!), nonprofit vice president, physicist
- Fyodor Pugachyov (Independent), Russian Army captain, Hero of the Soviet Union (1984)
- Yury Slobodkin (K–TR–zSS), Chairman of the Solnechnogorsk City Court (1976–present), former People's Deputy of Russia (1990–1993)
- Sergey Yushenkov (DVR–OD), Member of State Duma (1994–present), Chairman of the Duma Committee on Defense (1994–present)
- Aleksandr Zaytsev (Interethnic Union), Member of State Duma (1994–present) (previously ran as My Fatherland candidate)

==== Results ====
Summary of the 17 December 1995 Russian legislative election in the Mytishchi constituency
Candidate	Party	Votes	%
Sergey Yushenkov	Democratic Choice of Russia – United Democrats	59,413	18.47%
Yury Slobodkin	Communists and Working Russia - for the Soviet Union	50,467	15.69%
Aleksandr Aleksandrov	Independent	32,286	10.04%
Aleksandr Zaytsev	Interethnic Union	21,475	6.68%
Boris Nadezhdin	Independent	19,433	6.04%
Aleksandr Fedorov	Russian Party	17,446	5.42%
Vladimir Ponomaryov	Forward, Russia!	13,785	4.28%
Dmitry Pavlov	Independent	12,254	3.81%
Vladislav Gorokhov	Our Future	12,197	3.79%
Fyodor Pugachyov	Independent	11,931	3.71%
Sergey Plevako	Party of Workers' Self-Government	11,773	3.66%
Vladimir Korobeynikov	Zemsky Sobor	4,160	1.29%
against all		45,897	14.27%
Total		321,717	100%

=== 1999 ===
A by-election was scheduled after Against all line received the most votes.

==== Declared candidates ====
- Vladimir Aristarkhov (Independent), businessman
- Nina Berdnikova (CPRF), Member of State Duma (1996–present)
- Mikhail Bezrukov (Independent), regional hockey federation president
- Andrey Karaulov (Independent), journalist, TV host
- Andrey Kuznetsov (Independent), Russian Army officer
- Nadezhda Koldayeva (DN), Moscow Oblast administration official
- Yury Konov (LDPR), middle school teacher
- Aleksandr Lukin (Independent), former Member of Moscow City Council of People's Deputies (1990–1993), international relations specialist, son of State Duma member Vladimir Lukin
- Andrey Nechayev (SPS), former Minister of Economy of Russia (1992–1993)
- Yury Slobodkin (KTR–zSS), Chairman of the Solnechnogorsk City Court (1976–present), former People's Deputy of Russia (1990–1993), 1995 candidate for this seat
- Gennady Strekalov (Independent), cosmonaut, Hero of the Soviet Union (1980, 1984)
- Dmitry Valigursky (Independent), lecturer in economics
- Anatoly Tishin (Independent), nurse, National Bolshevik Party activist
- Aleksandr Vengerovsky (Independent), Member of State Duma (1994–present)
- Yury Yegorov (Independent), businessman
- Margarita Zhukova (Independent), nonprofit president, daughter of Soviet Marshall Georgy Zhukov
- Andrey Zvyagin (Stalin Bloc), sociologist

==== Withdrawn candidates ====
- Sergey Magdesyan (Independent)
- Aleksandr Utenkov (Independent)

==== Did not file ====
- Vladimir Belyakov (Independent), professor of physics
- Konstantin Chertkov (Independent), researcher
- Boris Churkin (Independent)
- Aleksandr Golovashchenko (Independent), 1994 candidate for this seat
- Arkady Gurov (Independent)
- Valery Lavrinenko (Independent)
- Dmitry Nikitenko (ROS)
- Vladimir Novikov (Independent), former Member of State Duma (1994–1995)
- Vladimir Pokhvoshchev (PME), rector of Ministry of Labour Russian Training Centre
- Vladimir Popov (Independent)
- Mikhail Romantsov (Independent)
- Anatoly Semyonov (Independent)
- Vyacheslav Zubenko (Independent), professor of economics

==== Declined ====
- Sergey Yushenkov (SPS), incumbent Member of State Duma (1994–present) (ran in the Tver constituency and on the party list)

==== Results ====
Summary of the 19 December 1999 Russian legislative election in the Mytishchi constituency
Candidate	Party	Votes	%
Vladimir Aristarkhov	Independent	45,925	14.02%
Nina Berdnikova	Communist Party	39,239	11.98%
Andrey Karaulov	Independent	36,452	11.13%
Andrey Nechayev	Union of Right Forces	30,226	9.23%
Aleksandr Lukin	Independent	26,428	8.07%
Gennady Strekalov	Independent	19,986	6.10%
Yury Slobodkin	Communists and Workers of Russia - for the Soviet Union	19,765	6.03%
Dmitry Valigursky	Independent	9,644	2.94%
Andrey Kuznetsov	Independent	7,477	2.28%
Anatoly Tishin	Independent	7,098	2.17%
Mikhail Bezrukov	Independent	6,602	2.02%
Nadezhda Koldayeva	Spiritual Heritage	6,066	1.85%
Margarita Zhukova	Independent	5,743	1.75%
Yury Konov	Liberal Democratic Party	3,979	1.21%
Aleksandr Vengerovsky	Independent	3,483	1.06%
Andrey Zvyagin	Stalin Bloc – For the USSR	2,705	0.83%
Yury Yegorov	Independent	1,233	0.38%
against all		46,799	14.29%
Total		327,522	100%

=== 2000 ===
==== Declared candidates ====
- Sergey Baburin (Independent), former Deputy Chairman of the State Duma (1996–1999), former Member of State Duma (1994–1999), chairman of the Russian All-People's Union (1991–present)
- Arkady Baskayev (Independent), Commander of the Moscow Military District (1993–present), Russian Army colonel general
- Nina Berdnikova (Independent), former Member of State Duma (1996–1999), 1999 candidate for this seat
- Mikhail Bezrukov (Independent), regional hockey federation president, 1999 candidate for this seat
- Galina Bozhedomova (Independent), union leader, 2000 presidential candidate
- Vladimir Bukin (Independent), businessman
- Konstantin Glodev (Independent), MMM bankruptcy trustee
- Sergey Goranov (Independent)
- Vladislav Gorokhov (Our Future), former People's Deputy of the Soviet Union (1989–1991), 1993 and 1999 candidate for this seat
- Vladimir Kostryukov (Independent), energy construction businessman
- Sergey Krivoshein (Independent), construction businessman
- Valery Kuznetsov (Independent)
- Valery Kvartalnov (Independent), rector of Russian International Academy of Tourism, 1993 candidate for this seat
- Andrey Nechayev (Independent), former Minister of Economy of Russia (1992–1993), 1999 candidate for this seat
- Gennady Strekalov (Independent), cosmonaut, Hero of the Soviet Union (1980, 1984), 1999 candidate for this seat
- Mikhail Zhivilo (Independent), metallurgy businessman
- Yury Zhivilo (Independent), metallurgy businessman, brother of Mikhail Zhivilo

==== Results ====
Summary of the 26 March 2000 by-election in the Mytishchi constituency
Candidate	Party	Votes	%
Arkady Baskayev	Independent	75,293	22.26%
Sergey Baburin	Independent	57,471	16.99%
Nina Berdnikova	Independent	29,863	8.83%
Gennady Strekalov	Independent	23,299	6.89%
Sergey Krivoshein	Independent	15,107	4.47%
Mikhail Bezrukov	Independent	14,651	4.33%
Andrey Nechayev	Independent	14,474	4.28%
Valery Kuznetsov	Independent	8,886	2.63%
Vladimir Bukin	Independent	6,726	1.99%
Vladislav Gorokhov	Independent	6,314	1.87%
Sergey Goranov	Independent	4,029	1.19%
Konstantin Glodev	Independent	3,345	0.99%
Vladimir Kostryukov	Independent	3,147	0.93%
Galina Bozhedomova	Independent	2,652	0.78%
Valery Kvartalnov	Independent	2,400	0.71%
Mikhail Zhivilo	Independent	525	0.16%
Yury Zhivilo	Independent	292	0.09%
against all		60,151	17.78%
Total		338,243	100%

=== 2003 ===
==== Declared candidates ====
- Vladimir Aristarkhov (Independent), businessman, 1999 candidate for this seat
- Arkady Baskayev (NPRF), incumbent Member of State Duma (2000–present)
- Valentina Derkach (Independent), tekhnikum director
- Vladislav Ivanov (Independent), transportation executive
- Ivan Klimenko (APR), medical businessman
- Boris Nadezhdin (SPS), Member of State Duma (2000–present), 1995 candidate for this seat
- Igor Titov (ORP Rus'), chairman of the party executive committee, political consultant
- Vitaly Uteshev (LDPR), State Duma staffer
- Viktor Zorkaltsev (CPRF), Member of State Duma (1994–present), Chairman of the Duma Committee on Civic Associations and Religious Organizations (1994–present)

==== Failed to qualify ====
- Viktor Antipov (Independent), legal specialist
- Dmitry Trubitsin (PME), engineer
- Vyacheslav Zhukov (Rodina), physician

==== Did not file ====
- Vladimir Babkin (Independent), aide to State Duma member
- Vasily Galaktionov (DPR), associate professor
- Sergey Sinozatsky (Independent), pensioner

==== Results ====
Summary of the 7 December 2003 Russian legislative election in the Mytishchi constituency
Candidate	Party	Votes	%
Arkady Baskayev (incumbent)	People's Party	90,359	30.90%
Vladimir Aristarkhov	Independent	43,091	14.73%
Boris Nadezhdin	Union of Right Forces	42,757	14.62%
Viktor Zorkaltsev	Communist Party	29,162	9.97%
Valentina Derkach	Independent	13,443	4.60%
Igor Titov	United Russian Party Rus'	7,120	2.43%
Vitaly Uteshev	Liberal Democratic Party	5,726	1.96%
Ivan Klimenko	Agrarian Party	4,000	1.37%
against all		49,170	16.81%
Total		293,515	100%

=== 2026 ===
==== Declared candidates ====
- Alexander Legkov (United Russia), Member of Moscow Oblast Duma (2018–present), 2014 Olympic Champion cross-country skier
- Andrey Lishin (The Greens), nonprofit president
- Daniil Ovsyannikov (RPPSS), Member of Lobnya Council (2021–present), entrepreneur
- Natalya Sinitsyna (New People), Member of Korolyov Council (2024–present), afterschool teacher
- Kirill Skvortsov (LDPR), marketing specialist
- Viktor Soshin (A Just Russia), Member of Mytishchi Council (1994–present), construction executive
- Artyom Vasilyev (CPRF), Member of Mytishchi Council (2024–present), first aide to Moscow Oblast Duma member Aleksandr Naumov
- Maksim Vladimirov (Yabloko), party activist

==== Did not file ====
- Boris Nadezhdin (Independent), former Member of State Duma (2000–2003), 1995 and 2003 candidate for this seat, 2018 and 2023 gubernatorial candidate, 2024 presidential candidate (declared foreign agent by the Ministry of Justice on July 10, 2026)

==== Declined ====
- Andrey Chermoshentsev (CPRF), aide to State Duma member Renat Suleymanov, historian

==== Results ====
Summary of the 18-20 September 2026 Russian legislative election in the Mytishchi constituency
Candidate	Party	Votes	%
Alexander Legkov	United Russia	131,386	51.13%
Artyom Vasilyev	Communist Party	34,618	13.47%
Natalya Sinitsyna	New People	27,920	10.87%
Kirill Skvortsov	Liberal Democratic Party	25,305	9.85%
Viktor Soshin	A Just Russia	15,048	5.86%
Maksim Vladimirov	Yabloko	8,812	3.43%
Andrey Lishin	The Greens	5,865	2.28%
Daniil Ovsyannikov	Party of Pensioners	4,394	1.71%
Total		256,945	100%
