= Aleksei Serebryakov (actor) =

Russian stage performer and actor (born 1964)

- Алексей Серебряков
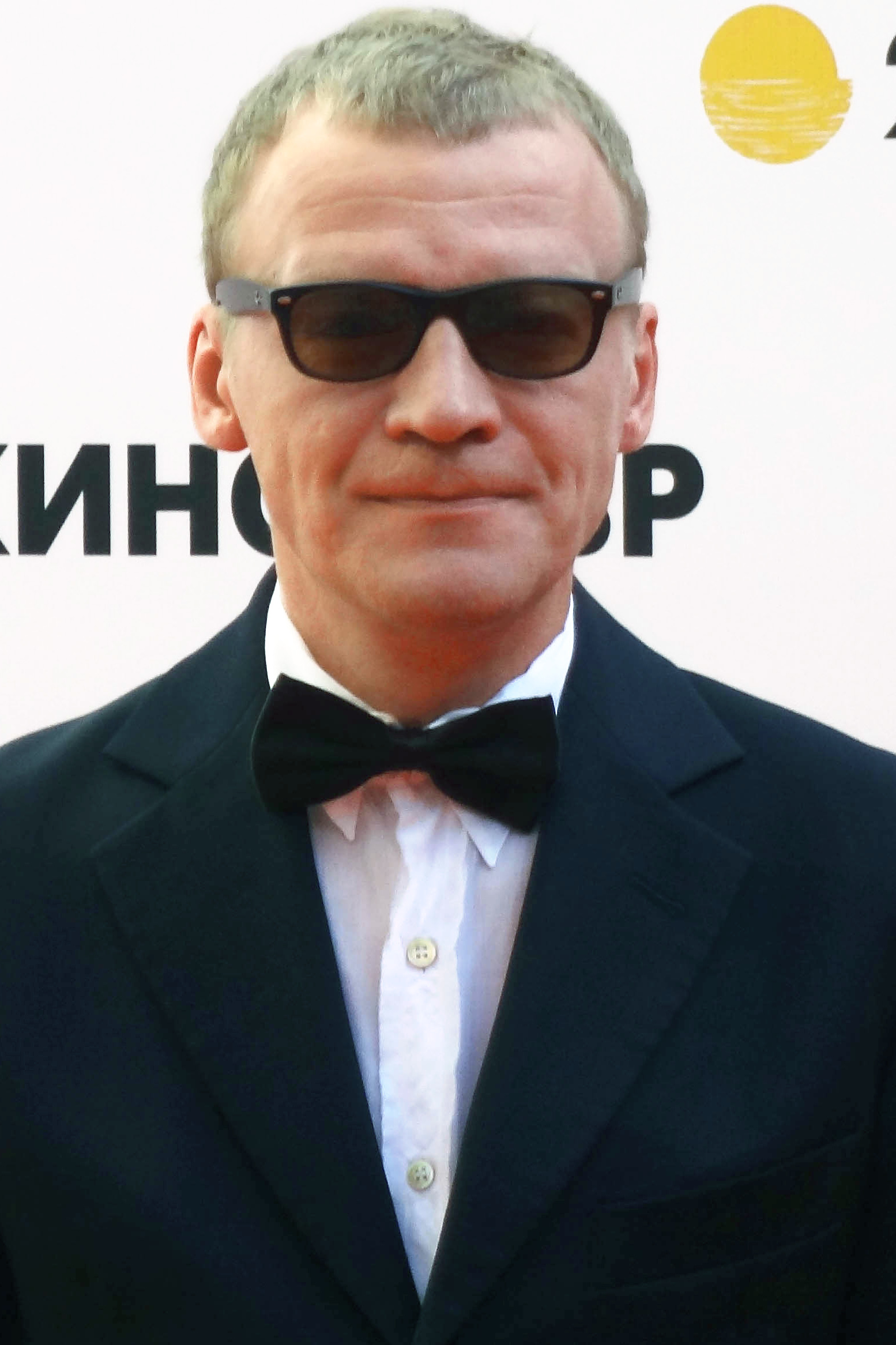
- Serebryakov in 2014
- Born: Aleksei Valeryevich Serebryakov; 3 July 1964 (age 62); Moscow, Russian SFSR, Soviet Union
- Citizenship: Russia
- Occupation: Actor

Aleksei Valeryevich Serebryakov (Russian: Алексей Валерьевич Серебряков; born 3 July 1964) is a Russian stage and film actor. He started acting at 15, and is one of the most popular and highly paid Russian actors. He has appeared in Leviathan and McMafia.

== Early life ==
He was born on July 3, 1964, in Moscow. His father was an aircraft engineer and his mother worked as a doctor at Gorky Film Studio. As a child, he attended music school (accordion class); at the age of 13 he made his debut as an actor when his music teacher had published his photo in the newspaper Vechernyaya Moskva. Serebryakov came to the attention of directors Valery Uskov and Vladimir Krasnopolsky, who were responsible for casting the Soviet television series Eternal Call.

== Career ==
=== Career beginnings ===
In 1986, he had graduated from the Lunacharsky State Institute for Theatre Arts, where he had been attending the acting school of Oleg Tabakov, after which he played for several years at the Moscow Theatre-Studio "Tabakerka" directed by Oleg Tabakov. In 1991, he left the theater.

After having graduated from the Russian Institute of Theatre Arts, Serebryakov starred in several films, including Silent Outpost (1986) and Accused of the Wedding (1986), and some others. He gained wide popularity due to his main character as a criminal fighter in Vladimir Feoktistov's movie Fan (1989).

=== 1990s–present ===
In 1990, Serebryakov appeared in Afghan Breakdown, directed by Vladimir Bortko. He also starred in the 1990 film Accidental Waltz, for which he won the best actor prize at the Locarno Film Festival. In 1994, he appeared in the Sergey Livnov drama Hammer and Sickle.

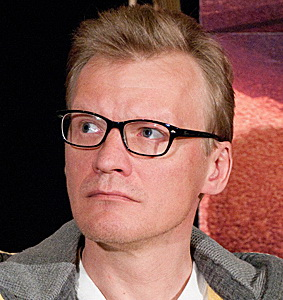
Alexey Serebryakov at a press conference dedicated to the release of the film The PyraMMMid, 2011

Later in the decade, he also appeared in numerous TV series, including Bandit Petersburg, Empire Under Attack, The White Guard and many others. Concurrently, he starred in the movies "Antikiller 2: Antiterror" and "Escape" by Yegor Konchalovsky, Dead Man's Bluff by Aleksei Balabanov, The 9th Company and Dark Planet by Fyodor Bondarchuk, Vadim Shmelev's The Apocalypse Code, Gloss by Andrei Konchalovsky, "Golden Section" by Sergei Debizhev, Once Upon a Time There Lived a Simple Woman by Andrei Smirnov, "Solo on the Saxophone" by Alexander Kirienko and the fantasy-anthology film Fairytale.Is.

He had performed in Lenkom Theatre between 2009 and 2012. He played Sergei Mamontov in the partly biographical film The PyraMMMid (2011), a fictional story inspired by financier Sergei Mavrodi (the founder of MMM pyramid scheme). In 2014, Serebryakov played the lead role of Kolya in Andrey Zvyagintsev's internationally acclaimed drama Leviathan. After that, Serebryakov appeared in Sergei Puskepalis's directorial debut, Clinch.

In 2015–2016, he continued acting in TV series, including Fartsa and The Method. In 2017, he played role of Dr. Andrey Richter in Doctor Richter, a Russian remake of the American medical drama series, House. In the same year, he appeared in the historical fantasy feature film Furious. Serebryakov appeared in the 2018 BBC series McMafia, where he played Dimitri Godman, mafia boss father of protagonist Alex.

In 2021 he starred in the US film Nobody as the Russian mobster named Yulian.

In 2024, he starred in the Palme d'Or-winning Anora as Nikolai Zakharov, the oligarch father of Ivan.

== Personal life ==
Sergei Serebryakov has been living with his wife Maria since the 1980s; they got married in the 1990s, and they have three children, one from Maria's previous marriage and two adopted; in March 2012, Serebryakov moved to Canada with his family, citing corruption and political instability in Russia as obstacles to raising children. He later stated that living in Canada is cheaper, despite not having Canadian citizenship; in 2021, Serebryakov allegedly returned to Russia. According to the actor, "actually, I didn't go anywhere, I just took my children to study".

=== Political views ===
In 2018, Serebryakov became embroiled in controversy over his statement in an interview that the most common traits of Russian people are "[brutal] force, rudeness and arrogance". He also said in the interview that he does not like two things about Vladimir Putin: lies and thieving. At a business forum in London later that year, he accused Russia of stirring up multiple wars.

In 2022, Serebryakov signed an open letter from the KinoSoyuz (organisation of Russian filmmakers) against Russia's military intervention in Ukraine.

== Awards ==
- 1990: Locarno Film Festival – Best Actor Award (Accidental Waltz)
- 1993: Sozvezdie International Film Festival, Russia – special jury prize (Higher measure)
- 1994: Kinoshock Film Festival – best male role (Hammer and Sickle)
- 1998: Merited Artist of the Russian Federation — for services in the field of art
- 2000: Festival "Vivat, Cinema of Russia!" (St. Petersburg) – prize for the best male role (Tests for Real Men)
- 2006: Festival "Vivat, Cinema of Russia!" (St. Petersburg) – prize for the best role (Vanyukhin's Children)
- 2010: People's Artist of the Russian Federation — for great achievements in the field of art
- 2014: IFFI Best Actor Award (Male) at 45th International Film Festival of India – (Leviathan)
- 2019: Nika Award for Best Actor (Van Goghs)

== Filmography ==
Film
| Year | Title | Role | Notes | Ref. |
|---|---|---|---|---|
| 2026 | Tyulpany | Grisha | | |
| 2025 | Yes! | Big Billionaire | French-Israeli-Cypriot-German film | |
| 2024 | Anora | Nikolai Zakharov | American film | |
| 2022 | Raiders of the Lost Library | Arkady | | |
| 2022 | Little Red Riding Hood | Westar | | |
| 2022 | The White List | Korotkov | | |
| 2021 | Tell Her | | | |
| 2021 | Nobody | Yulian Kuznetsov | American film | |
| 2020 | Spagat | Artyom | | |
| 2020 | The Petrichor | Igor | | |
| 2019 | The Coldest Game | General Krutov | | |
| 2019 | Space Dogs | Cosmic Voice | Narrator | |
| 2019 | Van Goghs | Mark Ginsbourg | Artist | |
| 2018 | How Vitka Chesnok Took Lyokha Shtyr to the Home for Invalids | Lyokha Shtyr | | |
| 2017 | Legend of Kolovrat | Prince Yuri | Grand prince of Ryazan | |
| 2016 | Dr. Richter | Dr. Andrey Richter | Based on Dr. Gregory House | |
| 2015 | Clinch | Vitaly Feodorov | Literature teacher. | |
| 2014 | Leviathan | Kolya | Nominated-European Film Award for Best Actor | |
| 2011 | The PyraMMMid | Sergei Mamontov | | |
| 2011 | Once Upon a Time There Lived a Simple Woman | Lebeda | | |
| 2011 | Fairytale.Is | Dad | | |
| 2010 | Ivanov | Nikolai Ivanov | Ivanov's adaptation | |
| 2008 | The Inhabited Island | Strannik | | |
| 2007 | Tiski | Major Dudaitis, from FSKN | | |
| 2007 | Gloss | Stasis | | |
| 2007 | Konservy | Usoltsev, Solyoniy | | |
| 2007 | The Apocalypse Code | Sergei | | |
| 2007 | Cargo 200 | Alexei Belov | | |
| 2006 | Transit | Capt. Yurchenko | | |
| 2005 | The 9th Company | Capt. from reconnaissance unit | | |
| 2005 | Dead Man's Bluff | "Doctor" | | |
| 2005 | Run All Day | Colonel Pakhomov | | |
| 2003 | Antikiller 2: Antiterror (ru) | Uzhakh Aduev | | |
| 1998 | Tests for Real Men | Тесты для настоящих мужчин | | |
| 1994 | Hammer and Sickle | Evdokim Kuznetsov | | |
| 1991 | Afghan Breakdown | Sgt. Arsyonov | | |
| 1990 | Accidental Waltz | Sergei | | |
| 1990 | Disintegration | Valery | | |

Television
| Year | Title | Role | Notes | Ref. |
|---|---|---|---|---|
| 1973–1983 | Eternal Call | Dima | | |
| 2000 | Empire Under Attack | Boris Savinkov | | |
| 2000 | Bandit Petersburg. Advocate | Oleg Zvantsev. "White Advocate" | | |
| 2003 | Bayazet (ru) | Lieutenant Karabanov | | |
| 2003 | World Wide 3 | Makarius' father | | |
| 2004 | The Penal Battalion (ru) | Vasilii Tverdokhlebov | | |
| 2011 | The White Guard | Felix Nay-Tours, colonel of the Hussars | | |
| 2011 | Diamond Hunters | Nikolai Shakhov | | |
| 2015 | The Method | Anufriev | | |
| 2018 | McMafia | Dimitri Godman | British series | |
| 2021 | Your Honor | Razin | | |
| 2024 | Others | Professor Alexander Ivanovich Ilyinsky | | |
