= The PyraMMMid =

- Directed by: Eldar Salavatov
- Written by: Sergei Krainev; Makism Vasilenko
- Produced by: Sergei Livnev; Lev Nikolau
- Starring: Aleksei Serebryakov; Fyodor Bondarchuk; Pyotr Fyodorov
- Cinematography: Goran Pavicevic
- Music by: Vladimir Osinskiy; Pavel Esenin
- Production company: Leopolis
- Distributed by: Universal Pictures
- Release date: 7 April 2011
- Running time: 105 minutes
- Country: Russia
- Language: Russian
- Budget: $2 200 000
- Box office: $1 173 667

The PyraMMMid (Russian: ПираМММида, romanized: PiraMMMida) is a 2011 Russian crime drama directed by Eldar Salavatov. The plot is based on the partially biographical story "Pyramid" by Sergei Mavrodi.

== Plot ==
Russia, early 1990s. Sergei Mamontov is looking for where to apply himself and his intellect. And so he orders a mock-up of a security paper with imperial script, rich ornament, watermarks and his own portrait in the center.

An active advertising campaign begins. In little more than two weeks people line up for the "mamontovs" ("mamontovki" in Russian). Powerful bankers and state structures are in confusion – no one has a clue how to stop it, and the MMM has already accumulated more than 10 million investors.

Furthermore, Mamontov is concerned that there are no rich people in the country, and all Soviet industry is exposed to privatization. He accumulates "private greeds" and decides to carry out an honest privatization. His way is blocked by the agent of Western imperialism - Belyavsky (an allusion to Boris Berezovsky) with his MegaVAZ-bank (an allusion to LogoVAZ). Belyavsky comes from the top - he makes connections in the Kremlin and is in charge of television. Belyavsky proposes to share Russia. Mamontov refuses: "I do not trade with Russia!", which attracts the financial inspectorate, who, without checking documents, imposes unthinkable demands for paying taxes upon him, which Mamontov executes. There is still enough money to ruin the bank of Belyavsky. By that time are already 20 million investors in Russia and every week the number increases by a million, the "mamontov's" goes on par with ruble. Mamontov threatens to seize power with the help of investors who are facing ruin. During a one-minute audience with the President, Mamontov appears as a guardian for the state amid a corrupt environment and asks for a change in the law - to allow foreigners to be involved in their financial system in order to subordinate the Western oligarchy and thereby make Boris Yeltsin's Russia leader of the world. But Belyavsky begins to threaten the life of Mamontov's daughter and he eventually falls into a trap. On the Ostankino Tower, the battered Mamontov again refuses to cooperate with Belyavsky, despite the proposed opportunity to become the "head of state". Mamontov hopes to leave with his daughter, defending himself by having a recording of a conversation with a representative of the FCS (where he offered similar "privileges"), from his assistant Vera, but she, escaping from the people of Belyavsky, drops the recording in a park and on charges of non-payment of taxes, Mamontov gets in prison and comes out after 7 years.

== Cast ==
- Aleksei Serebryakov – Sergey Mamontov
- Fyodor Bondarchuk – Belyavsky
- Pyotr Fyodorov – Anton
- Ekaterina Vilkova – Vera
- Anastasia Richie – Button
- Nikita Salopin – Zotik
- Sergey Koltakov – Prime Minister
- Yuri Tsurilo – General
- Oleksiy Gorbunov – Colonel
- Artyom Mikhalkov – major
- Igor Yatsko – Rezo
- Daniil Spivakovsky – Gutov
- Anna Mikhalkova – wife of Mamontov
- Vladimir Permyakov – Lyonya Golubkov (cameo)
- Bogdan Titomir – cameo

== See also ==
- Sergei Mavrodi
- MMM
