= Permyakov =

Permyakov (Russian: Пермяков) is a Russian masculine surname, its feminine counterpart is Permyakova. It may refer to

- Olga Permyakova (born 1982), Russian ice hockey defender
- Vladimir Permyakov (born 1952), Russian actor
- Yakov Permyakov (died 1712), Russian seafarer, explorer, merchant and Cossack
