= Tri Energy =

Fraudulent US business

Tri Energy was a business enterprise run by Henry Uliomereyon Jones, better known as Dr. Henry Jones, with associates Arthur Simburg and Robert Jennings.

Jones was a would-be record producer in Marina del Rey, California, running MIG Records (later renamed Global Village Records) and Marina Investors Group Inc. Jones and his associates were convicted of running a fraudulent Ponzi scheme operation and affinity fraud through Tri Energy. They defrauded over 735 people of $50 million, resulting in several court actions both civil and criminal cases, and imprisonment of the three Tri Energy associates.

== History ==
Tri Energy was involved in:

- A coal mine venture in four coal mines in Kentucky which Tri Energy claimed were profitable and that would potentially produce a reported 99.3% emissions-free coal. In fact there were only two mines, and neither was profitable.
- A so-called international "gold deal" for transfer of gold from Israel to Luxembourg to United Arab Emirates through the help of an unnamed Saudi Arabian prince. The gold involved was 20,000 metric tons of bullion, twice as much gold as the entire U.S. reserves.

The schemes promised to potential investors astronomical returns in a short period (reaching 100% in just 60 days).

Kim Flanigan, a Mormon who owned a furniture store in Montana at the time, alerted authorities to the scam. Flanigan became alarmed when she heard her own widowed mother and her aunt were involved as both participants and recruiters for what appeared to be a classic get-rich-quick scheme. Flanigan's mother and aunts were not charged, as investigators determined they were victims of the scam. But authorities launched extensive investigations that would eventually bring down the $50 million Ponzi scheme and put its three ringleaders in federal prison.

The Securities and Exchange Commission (SEC) introduced many tapes, transcripts and summaries of sessions conducted by the ringleaders from early 2004 to early 2005. They showed Simburg leading the meetings, with Jennings speaking about the coal mine project and Jones offering updates on the alleged gold transaction.

== Rulings ==
On August 13, 2007, settlements were announced with the Tri Energy defendants, defendant Daniel J. Merriman and his companies DJM, LLC, Financial MD, Inc., and Financial MD and Associates, defendant Mildred Stultz, and relief defendant Nga Wing Lau, a.k.a. Adrienne Lau with temporary restraining order and asset freeze against the Tri Energy defendants.

SEC obtained a default judgment against Jones and his companies Marina Investors Group, Inc. and MIG Records (Global Village Records) on March 20, 2008.

Final judgments was obtained against relief defendant Thomas Avery and his company T.M.A. Investment Enterprises and relief defendant R.P.J. Investment Group, Inc. on April 9, 2008, ordering $70,000 in disgorgement plus $4,342 in prejudgment interest jointly and severally between Avery and his company, and ordering $7,364 in disgorgement against R.P.J.

The lawsuit "Securities and Exchange Commission v. Tri Energy, Inc., H & J Energy Company, Inc., Marina Investors Group, Inc., Lowell Decker, Robert Jennings, Henry Jones, Arthur Simburg, Mildred Stultz, DJM, LLC, Financial MD, Inc., Financial MD and Associates, Inc., Daniel J. Merriman, Global Village Records, and La Vie D'Argent, as defendants, and R.P.J. Investment Group, Inc., T.M.A. Investment Enterprises, Thomas Avery, and Wing NGA Lau, a/k/a Adrienne Lau, as relief defendants" in Case No. ED CV 05-00351 AG(MANx) (C.D. California) resulted in a judgement of $51 million against Tri Energy, Inc. and defendants Arthur Simburg and Robert Jennings for their role in a massive affinity fraud and Ponzi Scheme.

The Final Judgment on April 13, 2009, against defendants Tri Energy, Inc., H & J Energy Company, Inc., Robert Jennings, Arthur Simburg, and La Vie D'Argent (collectively the "Tri Energy Defendants") with a settled action, ruled for payment of $35 million in disgorgement and $2,048,466 in prejudgment interest, and ordered Simburg and Jennings to pay a civil penalty of $7 million each.

== Imprisonment ==
In the criminal cases, prison sentences were passed:

- Arthur Simburg was sentenced on November 17, 2008, to 9 years' imprisonment after entering into a plea agreement. He was released from federal prison on November 10, 2016.
- Robert Jennings was convicted after a jury trial on July 11, 2008, and sentenced to 12 years' imprisonment on November 17, 2008.
- Defendant Henry Jones was extradited from Hong Kong and convicted after a jury trial on July 11, 2008, and was sentenced to 20 years' imprisonment on April 3, 2009. He is currently scheduled for release from federal prison on October 10, 2024.

== In popular culture ==
- American Greed, a CNBC series, covered the history of the Tri Energy scheme in episode 3 of season 5.
