= Lyonya Golubkov =

Russian advertising character

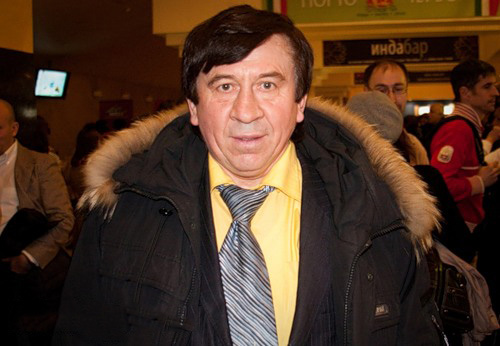
Vladimir Permyakov

Lyonya Golubkov (Russian: Лёня Голубков) is a "common Russian guy" played by Vladimir Permyakov in notorious MMM commercials from 1992 to 1994. Due to a very aggressive advertising campaign by MMM owned by Sergei Mavrodi, most people know Vladimir Permyakov by this name.

In advertising, Lyonya Golubkov was an excavator operator who invested into MMM stock and became rich enough to buy himself a new apartment, house, etc. (Later for marketing reasons Lyonya marked out his initial plans as unwise and "opted" to buy an excavator).

Extensive media exposure made Vladimir Permyakov quite popular. However, after the crash of MMM, he became an outcast since people began to blame him for advertising a Ponzi scheme. For several years Permyakov only held sporadic jobs in different plays. Later he started getting minor roles in TV series, and in some of them he even played Lyonya Golubkov. He also wrote his memoir How I Became Lyonya Golubkov.
