= Maksim Surayev =

Russian politician and cosmonaut (born 1972)

- Максим Сураев
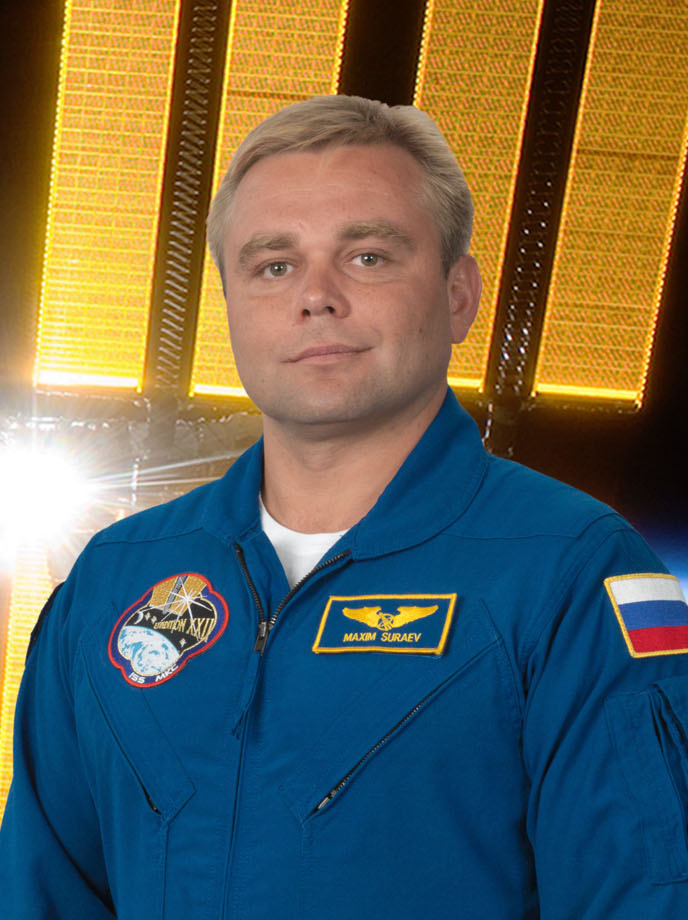
- Surayev in 2009

Member of the State Duma for Moscow Oblast
- In office 5 October 2016 – 12 October 2021
- Preceded by: constituency re-established
- Succeeded by: Vyacheslav Fomichyov
- Constituency: Balashikha (No. 117)

Personal details
- Born: 24 May 1972 (age 54) Chelyabinsk, RSFSR, USSR
- Party: United Russia
- Education: Kacha Air Force Pilot School; Zhukovsky Air Force Engineering Academy; RANEPA
- Occupation: Fighter Pilot
- Space career

Roscosmos cosmonaut
- Rank: Colonel
- Time in space: 334d 12h 11min
- Selection: 1997 TsPK Cosmonaut Group
- Total EVAs: 2
- Total EVA time: 9hr 22min
- Mission: Soyuz TMA-16 (Expedition 21/22), Soyuz TMA-13M (Expedition 40/41)
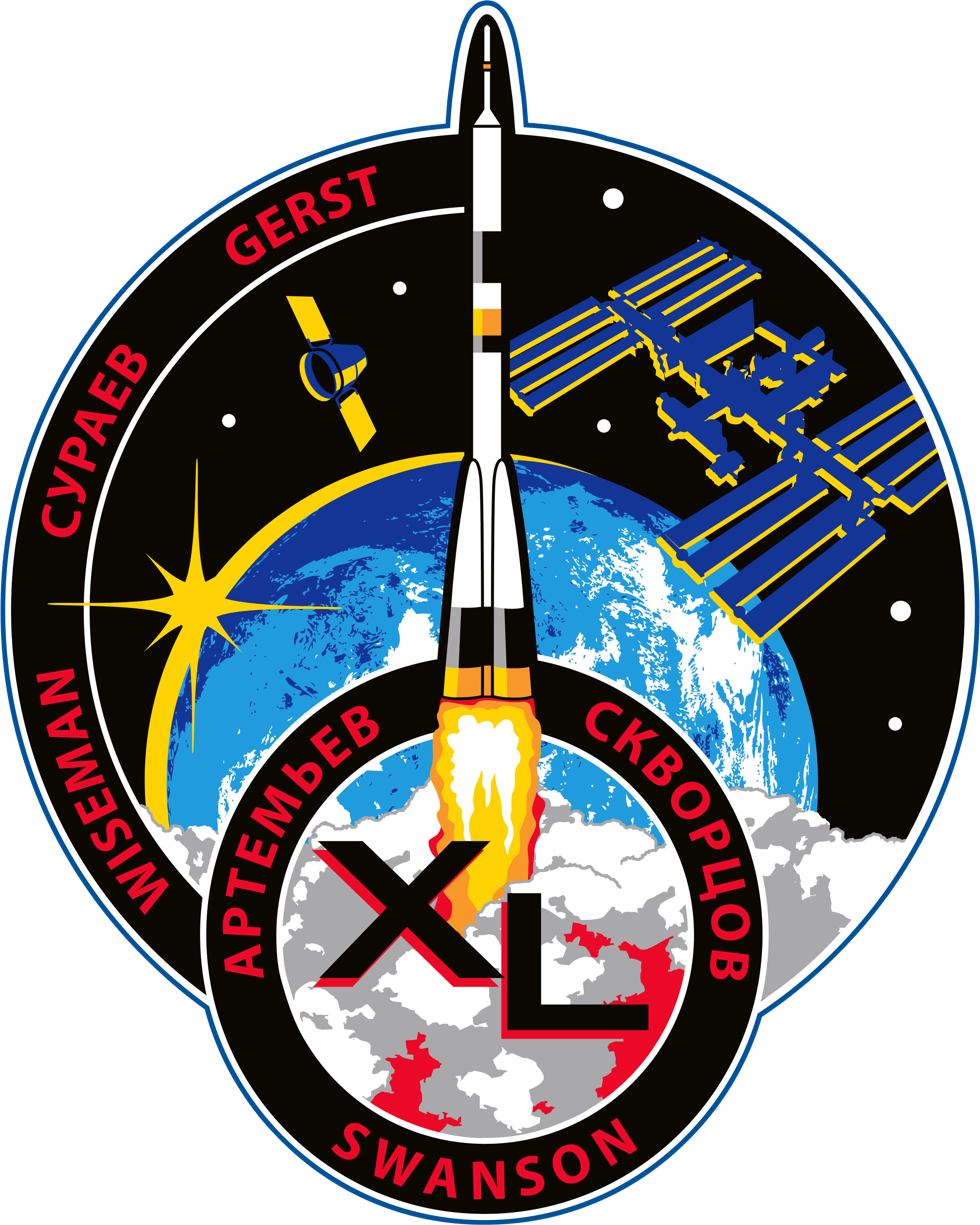
- Mission insignia
- Retired: September 23, 2016

Maksim Viktorovich Surayev (Russian: Максим Викторович Сураев, born 24 May 1972) is a Russian politician and retired cosmonaut.

Surayev was a backup crew member for ISS Expeditions 17 and 19 from 2006 to 2009. In 2009, he commanded a spacecraft that traveled to the International Space Station where he served as flight engineer for 167 days, returning in 2010. Surayev also served as a flight engineer on the International Space Station as a member of the crew of Expedition 22, and flight engineer and expedition commander of Expeditions 40 and 41. In his career, Surayev made two spacewalks, one in 2010 with fellow cosmonaut Oleg Kotov which lasted 5 hours and 44 minutes and again in 2014 with Aleksandr Samokutyaev in a spacewalk that lasted 3 hours and 38 minutes.

Surayev retired from the cosmonaut corps in 2016 and was elected to the State Duma from the United Russia party. He served in the State Duma between 2016 and 2021. In 2010, he was awarded Russia's highest honour when he was made a Hero of the Russian Federation.

== Early life and education ==
Surayev was born in Chelyabinsk. During his childhood, Suraev lived in several places due to his father's military commitments. First he moved from his birthplace, Chelyabinsk in the Urals, to Siberia. When his father entered the military academy, the Suraev family moved again to the environs of Moscow. While his father served several postings, Suraev again moved from one town to another around Moscow.

Surayev is married to Suraeva (née Khorokhordina) Anna Alexandrovna. They have two daughters, Arina and Ksenia. His recreational interests include sports and reading. He is a qualified diver and paraborne instructor.

Surayev graduated with honors from the Kacha Air Force Pilot School as pilot-engineer in 1994; graduated with honors from the Zhukovski Air Force Academy in 1997 as pilot-engineer-researcher. In 2007, he received a law degree from the Russian Academy of Civil Service.

== Cosmonaut career ==
From December 1997 to November 1999, Surayev completed basic space training. In November 1999 he was qualified as a test-cosmonaut. From January 2000 he was in ISS advanced training. From March 2006 until April 2008 Surayev was assigned as a backup ISS Expedition 17 crew member. From April 2008 until March 2009 he was a member of the ISS Expedition 19 backup crew.

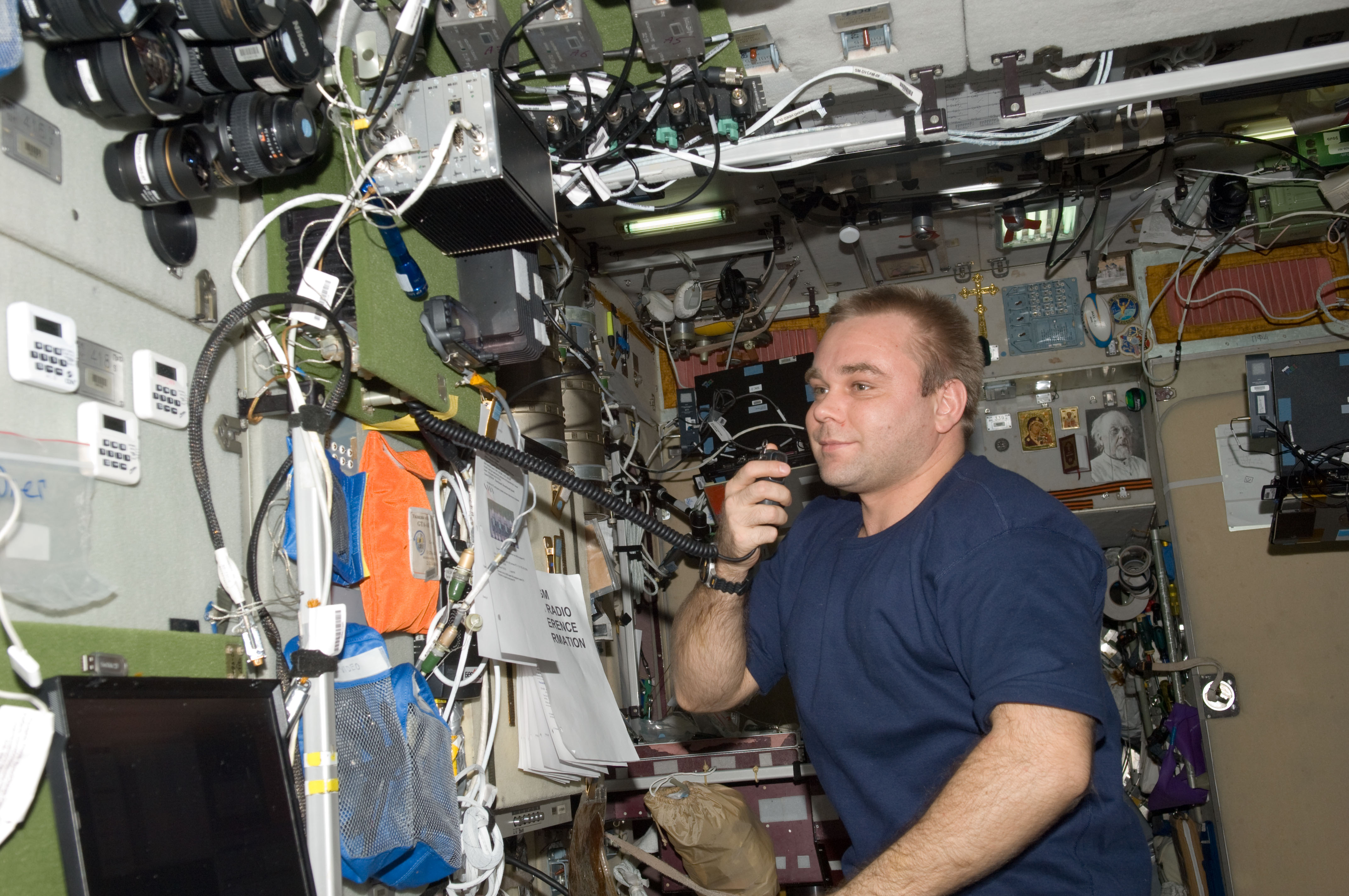
Surayev conducting a ham radio session inside the Zvezda module.

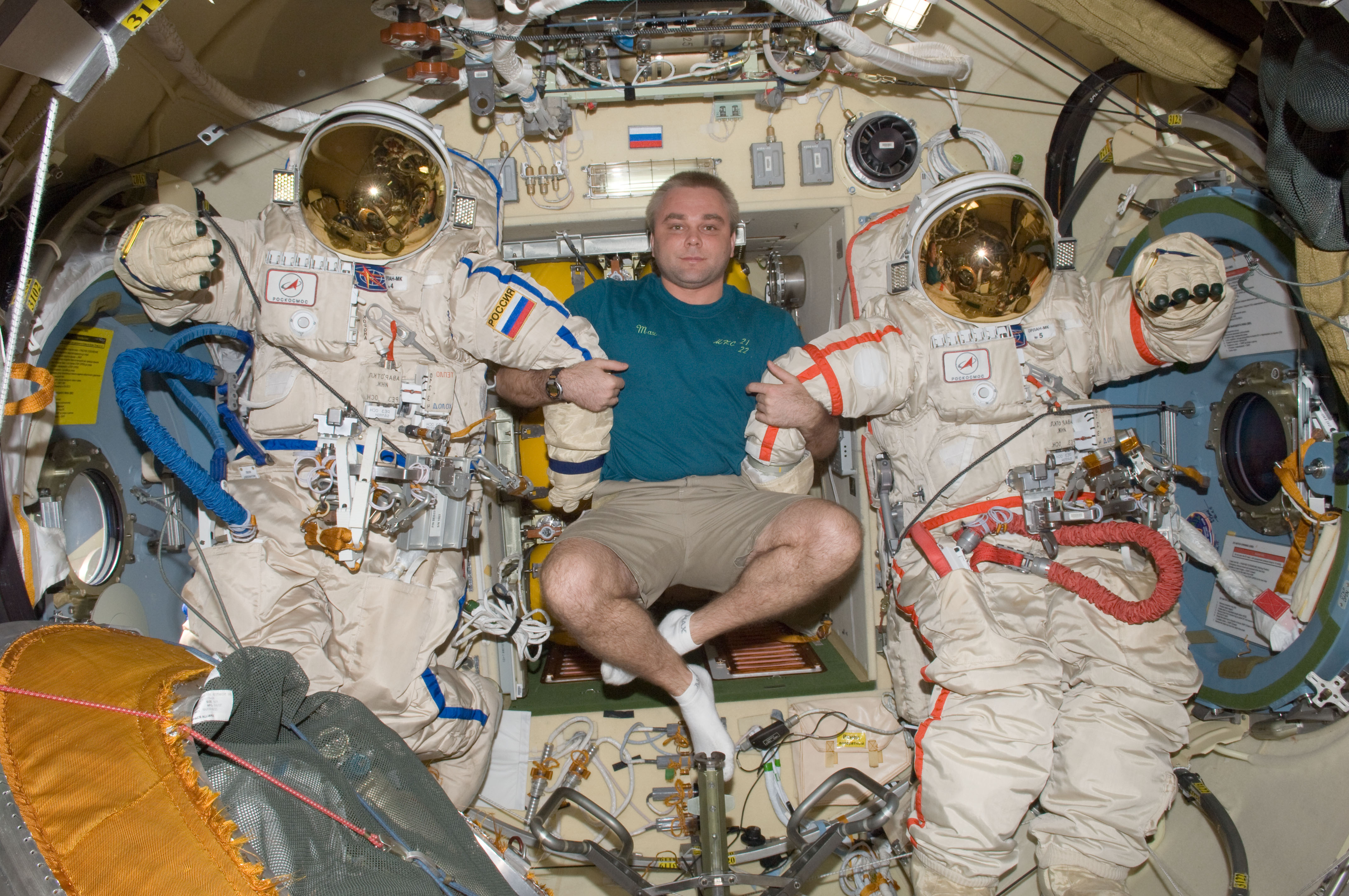
Surayev next to two Orlan-MK models in the Poisk Docking Module.

=== Expedition 21/22 ===
Surayev served as a Flight Engineer on the International Space Station as a member of the Expedition 22 crew. He also served in the same capacity during Expedition 21 having traveled to the station aboard Soyuz TMA-16 on 30 September 2009 from the Baikonour cosmodrome in Kazakhstan. He was the commander of the Soyuz spacecraft. Surayev with Jeffrey Williams landed their Soyuz TMA-16 spacecraft on the steppes of Kazakhstan on 18 March 2010, concluding a 167-day stay aboard the International Space Station.

Surayev kept a blog while in space.

=== Expedition 40/41 ===
Surayev served as a Flight Engineer on the International Space Station as a member of the Expedition 40/41 crew. The Soyuz TMA-13M spacecraft commanded by Surayev and carrying crew mates Alexander Gerst and Reid Wiseman lifted off from Baikonour's historic 1/5 launch pad on 28 May 2014. Soyuz TMA-13M docked with the space station's Rassvet Module on 29 May, approximately six hours after launch.

As part of the ISS crew, Surayev conducted scientific activities and saw extensive visiting vehicle traffic including the Russian Progress freighter, the American Dragon and Cygnus spacecraft, and the final mission of the European ATV - Georges Lemaître ATV. He served as ISS expedition commander of Expedition 41 from 10 September until 10 November 2014. The mission returned to Earth on 10 November at 03:58 UTC.

=== Spacewalks ===
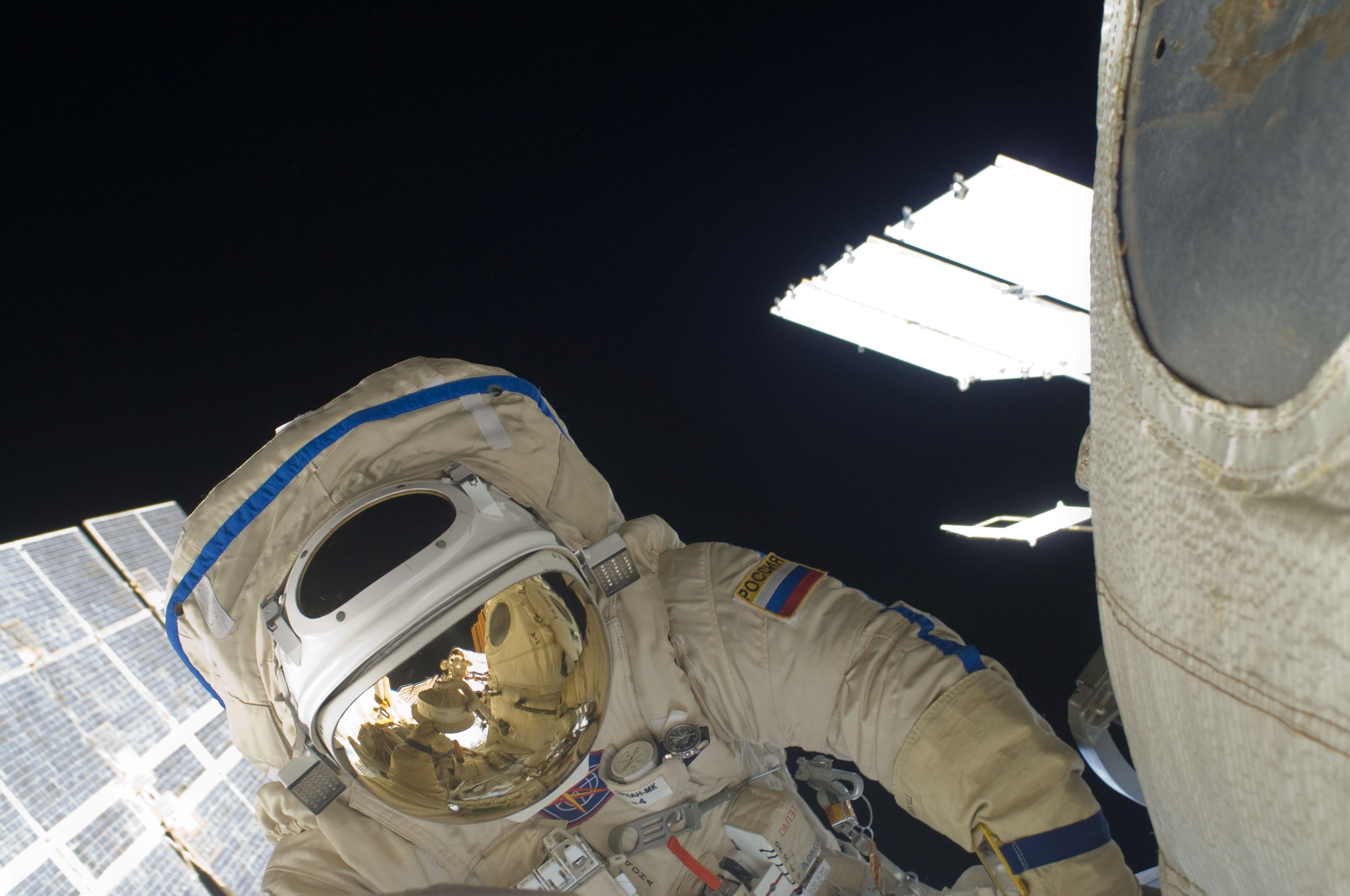
Maxim Suraev participates in a spacewalk to prepare MRM-2 for dockings.

On 14 January 2010 Surayev went outside the ISS into space with fellow Russian cosmonaut Oleg Kotov to begin his first spacewalk. The spacewalk started at 10:05 GMT when Surayev and Kotov, wearing new Russian Orlan-MK computerised spacesuits, floated out of the Pirs Docking compartment airlock. The spacewalking duo connected cables between the Poisk and Zvezda modules, installed docking targets and Kurs aerials and attached additional handrails to exit hatches. They also retrieved a Russian biological experiment from the outside hull of the ISS and tossed out two big wads of space trash that contained unneeded insulation covers. The spacewalk lasted 5 hours and 44 minutes.

Surayev and cosmonaut Aleksandr Samokutyaev performed a spacewalk (Russian EVA-40) outside the space station on 22 October 2014. Although planned as a six-hour spacewalk, the cosmonauts were able to complete all the scheduled tasks in 3 hours and 38 minutes. During the extravehicular activity, Surayev and Samokutyaev dismantled the RK 21-8 Radiometria science payload and the 2ASF1-1 and 2ASF1-2 KURS antennas from the Poisk module. The RK-21-8 science payload was installed aboard the Space Station during the Russian EVA-28 in early 2011 and consisted of an antenna system with calibrator, a Microwave Radiometer receiver system and a Command-Information Unit. It was used for a series of seismic forecast and earthquake studies. The RK-21-8 payload was jettisoned by Surayev 33 minutes into the EVA on a safe departure trajectory from the Space Station. Surayev and Samokutyaev also released a protective cover from the EXPOSE-R payload developed by the European Space Agency to conduct astrobiology studies by exposing samples and experiments to the space environment. When the cosmonauts finished operations at the Poisk module, they photographed the surface of the orbital station for specialists to assess its condition later. Russian EVA-40 was the 184th spacewalk in support of the Space Station assembly.

== Political career ==
In 2016, he was elected to the State Duma from the United Russia party and retired from the cosmonaut corps. He served in the State Duma between 2016 and 2021.

== Awards and honours ==
Maksim Surayev is a recipient of the Gold Star Medal of Hero of Russia. He received the medal from the Russian president Dmitry Medvedev on 30 December 2010.

== Personal life ==
Surayev is qualified to fly L-39 and Su-27 aircraft, and has logged around 700 hours of flight time. Surayev is a Class 3 Air Force pilot, a qualified diver and paraborne instructor.

== See also ==
- List of Heroes of the Russian Federation

Preceded by Steven Swanson	ISS Expedition Commander; 10 September 2014 to 10 November 2014	Succeeded by Barry E. Wilmore
