= Stock Generation =

Defunct Ponzi scheme

Stock Generation (SG) was a Ponzi scheme operated by SG Ltd. that operated on the Internet from 1998 to early 2000. Stock Generation allowed people to trade "virtual companies" using real money and promised unsustainably high returns on investment.

== History ==
The website was established in January 1998 and was run from Dominica using a gambling license issued by the Caribbean country, and the U.S. Securities and Exchange Commission was initially unable to cite Stock Generation's founders and owners (members of the Russian conglomerate MMM) for securities violations. In late 1999, participants began to experience difficulties in redeeming their virtual shares. Finally, in 2000, the market "crashed". On March 20, 2000, SG took down the website on pretext of a server maintenance while unilaterally suspending all pending requests to withdraw funds and sharply reducing participants' account balances in all companies except the privileged company by invoking the game's Rule 13. (Note: "§13.[...]In the interests of the holders of shares belonging to companies 10 and 11, and of preserving the dynamics of the game, the owners of SG have the right to decide against reducing the SELL price of these companies in favor of treating the amount of money spent on the purchase of shares in Companies 10 and 11 as if it had been spent on the purchase of shares in Company 9, the Privileged Company at the BUY price on that day.") Two weeks later, SG peremptorily announced a reverse stock split for its highest-yield company, applying a caveat in the definition for companies 10 and 11 (as defined in Rule 26.6) (Note: "§26.6. High-Profit and High-Risk Companies (10,11). [...] The share price of [companies 10 and 11] increases very fast - over the past few months at a rate of 50% and 100% per month, respectively. However, in theory their value can fall just as fast. The round-on-round decrease for Company No. 10, can be as 50%, i.e. the shares could suddenly lose half of their value. In the case of Company No. 11, there is no such limit, which means that the share could become total worthless. By the way, to date [as of March 3, 2000] this has never suddenly occurred.") which caused the share prices to plummet to less than 1/10,000 of their previous values, while other shares (including those that were "guaranteed" not to decrease in value) were devalued by 50% to 95%. At about the same time, SG stopped responding to participant requests for the return of funds, yet continued to solicit new participants through its website. By May, Stock Generation began banning players who started to question its legitimacy on other forums.

The SEC then sued in the U.S. District Court for the District of Massachusetts, alleging that the "virtual stock exchange" was in effect a Ponzi scheme. The court initially ruled in favor of Stock Generation, stating that the site adequately described the market as "a game", not an investment vehicle. The United States Court of Appeals for the First Circuit later reversed the District Court, stating that "the opportunity to invest in the shares of the privileged company, described on SG's website, constituted an invitation to enter into an investment contract within the jurisdictional reach of the federal securities laws." The game was shut down around June 1, 2000, but the home page continued running until autumn of that year, although none of the links worked by that time; it briefly reopened in early 2001 following the Massachusetts court ruling, announcing that the game would return at one point (were it not for the First Circuit decision). In 2003 the SEC obtained permanent injunctions against its operator, SG Ltd. and relief defendants SG Perfect and SG Trading, which profited from the disbursement of funds fraudulently gained by SG Ltd.

== Operation ==
Stock Generation's website traded shares of 11 "virtual" companies. Each of those companies had its name and logo, but they were most often referred to by the number under which they were listed.

Companies 1 to 8 were traded for purely "gambling" purposes, as their shares could go up and down randomly. Having those 8 companies "trading" on their website allowed Stock Generation to claim its enterprise as online gambling venture, rather than an actual stock market or any other investment-related business, to which SEC rules would apply.

Company 9, named Golden Nuggets, was the "privileged" company, with its shares "guaranteed" never to decrease in value. Promised return was originally 10% a month (215% annually), but was later reduced to 7% a month (125% annually). In early April 2000, Stock Generation, despite all previous guarantees, devalued its privileged company shares to 5% of their previous value.

Companies 10 and 11, named MegaByte and The Fountain of Youth respectively, promised monthly returns of 50% and 100% (later 40% and 70%) respectively. At the same time, share prices could plummet 50% for company 10 and 100% (e.g. all the way down to 0) for company 11. That caveat, as defined in the basic rules of the game pertaining to these companies (Rule 26.6), was another way for Stock Generation to justify their claims that this was a gambling website, rather than an investment vehicle.

Stock Generation was reluctant to invoke Rule 26.6's devaluation clause throughout most of the time the game was active. Instead they chose to apply another rule (known as Rule 13) which permitted Stock Generation to reduce individual account balances by recalculating them as if all the funds had been originally invested in the "privileged" company 9. For instance, a user that chose to invest their $50 sign-up bonus in the company 11's shares, kept the funds there for a year and then sought to withdraw all at once, could see their balance going down from $204,800 (100% monthly rate, compounded twice a week) to $157 (10% monthly rate compounded twice a week) and the transaction history would state that he had invested all those funds in the company 9 shares rather than in the company 11.

Rule 13 allowed Stock Generation to avoid massive five or six figure withdrawals, thus allowing the system to last over 2 years, with its share prices increasing over 10,000-fold (as opposed to Stock Generation's predecessor, the MMM which only lasted about 6 months, with its stock price increasing "only" 127-fold). Judging from the complaints on the SG bulletin board, application of rule 13 had become widespread by early 2000, as demands for withdrawals increased. On March 20, 2000, Rule 13 was applied to every account.

The devaluation clause in Rule 26.6 was applied about two weeks later, for the first time since the game was launched. The value of the company 10's share was cut in half. Company 11 shares underwent a 1-for-10,000 reverse split, with the actual share price plummeting to less than 1/100,000th of its value (from over $1 per share to $0.10 per "new" share, worth 10,000 old ones). On the same day, Stock Generation reduced the price of the company 9 shares from $16.90 to $0.84 - in clear violation of their own rules as those shares were guaranteed never to decrease in value. By that point, Stock Generation's users began reporting the game to both Dominican authorities and the SEC; in return, the site's administrators began banning players that criticized them on finance forums such as at Delphi.

Stock Generation continued to operate for several weeks after that, offering returns of up to 150% a month, but further legal troubles led to their website being halted by June 1, 2000.

== Legal opinion ==
The description below is a quotation of the public information from the United States Court of Appeals for the First Circuit, as decided in SEC v. SG, Ltd et al., 265 F.3d 42 (1st Circuit 2001):

"StockGeneration" website offering on-line denizens an opportunity to purchase shares in eleven different "virtual companies" listed on the website's "virtual stock exchange." SG arbitrarily set the purchase and sale prices of each of these imaginary companies in biweekly "rounds," and guaranteed that investors could buy or sell any quantity of shares at posted prices. SG placed no upper limit on the amount of funds that an investor could squirrel away in its virtual offerings.

The SEC's complaint focused on shares in a particular virtual enterprise referred to by SG as the "privileged company". SG advised potential purchasers to pay "particular attention" to shares in the privileged company and boasted that investing in those shares was a "game without any risk." To this end, its website announced that the privileged company's shares would unfailingly appreciate, boldly proclaiming that "[t]he share price of [the privileged company] is supported by the owners of SG, this is why its value constantly rises; on average at a rate of 10% monthly (this is approximately 215% annually)." To add plausibility to this representation and to allay anxiety about future pricing, SG published prices of the privileged company's shares one month in advance.

While SG conceded that a decline in the share price was theoretically possible, it assured prospective participants that "under the rules governing the fall in prices, [the share price for the privileged company] cannot fall by more than 5% in a round." To bolster this claim, it vouchsafed that shares in the privileged company were supported by several distinct revenue streams. According to SG's representations, capital inflow from new participants provided liquidity for existing participants who might choose to sell their virtual shareholdings. As a backstop, SG pledged to allocate an indeterminate portion of the profits derived from its website operations to a special reserve fund designed to maintain the price of the privileged company's shares. SG asserted that these profits emanated from four sources: (1) the collection of a 1.5% commission on each transaction conducted on its virtual stock exchange; (2) the bid-ask spread on the virtual shares; (3) the "skillful manipulation" of the share prices of eight particular imaginary companies, not including the privileged company, listed on the virtual stock exchange; and (4) SG's right to sell shares of three other virtual companies (including the privileged company). As a further hedge against adversity, SG alluded to the availability of auxiliary stabilization funds which could be tapped to ensure the continued operation of its virtual stock exchange.

SG's website contained lists of purported "big winners," an Internet bulletin board featuring testimonials from supposedly satisfied participants, and descriptions of incentive programs that held out the prospect of rewards for such activities as the referral of new participants (e.g., SG's representation that it would pay "20, 25 or 30% of the referred player's highest of the first three payments") and the establishment of affiliate websites.

At least 800 United States domiciliaries, paying real cash, purchased virtual shares in the virtual companies listed on the defendants' virtual stock exchange.
