= Doctor Richter =

- Also known as: Richter
- Genre: Medical drama
- Created by: David Shore
- Starring: Alexey Serebryakov; Vitaly Haev; Anna Mikhalkova
- Composer: Alexei Aigui
- Country of origin: Russia
- Original language: Russian
- No. of seasons: 3
- No. of episodes: 56

Production
- Executive producer: Andrei Proshkin
- Running time: 41–49 minutes
- Production companies: Non-Stop Production; NBCUniversal International Formats

Original release
- Network: Russia-1
- Release: November 13, 2017 – November 21, 2019

Related
- House

Doctor Richter is a Russian television medical drama that was aired on the Russia-1 network from 2017 to 2019. The series' main character is Dr. Andrei Richter (Alexey Serebryakov), a pain medication-dependent, unconventional, misanthropic medical genius who leads a team of diagnosticians at the 100th Clinic Hospital in Moscow. The series serves as a direct and authorised remake of House for Russian television, after VGTRK purchased the broadcast rights from NBCUniversal.

In 2010, a Russian TV series titled Doctor Tyrsa, which was also loosely modelled on House, aired on Channel One Russia, but lasted only one season.

== Production ==
The production began in April 2016.

Actor Alexey Serebryakov was cast as the lead role in the series. Shooting began in April, while the first season was released in late 2017.

On a project commissioned by the media holding VGTRK and channel “Russia-1” works produced by Alexander Rodnyansky from “Non-stop production”.

The general director of Russia 1, Anton Zlatopolsky, said that a remake of such a popular series is a serious challenge for the channel. “As a rule, neither the professionalism of the producers, nor famous actors, nor invested funds guarantee absolute success when it comes to local remakes. There is always a couple of secret components that make the show outstanding, and we know how to make them work,” said Zlatopolsky.
