= Encore, Once More Encore! =

- Directed by: Pyotr Todorovsky
- Written by: Pyotr Todorovsky
- Produced by: Mira Todorovskaya
- Starring: Valentin Gaft; Irina Rozanova; Yevgeny Mironov; Elena Yakovleva; Stanislav Govorukhin
- Cinematography: Yuri Raisky
- Edited by: Olga Kolotikova
- Music by: Igor Kantyukov
- Production company: Mosfilm
- Release date: 1992
- Running time: 96 minutes
- Country: Russia
- Language: Russian

Encore, Once More Encore! (Russian: Анкор, ещё анкор!, romanized: Ankor, escho ankor!) is a 1992 post-war eccentric tragi-comedy set in the late 1940s and early 1950s. It was released in the United States on October 10, 1992.

The film has won 5 awards, including The Best Film Nika Award, 1993.

== Plot ==
In a distant garrison town, life proceeds at a measured pace. The officers drink and debauch, while the soldiers serve. Meanwhile, the accidentally unleashed human emotions are suffocated by the atmosphere of cruelty and hypocrisy.

Lt. Poletaev (Yevgeny Mironov) is an irrepressible character. Even the grim nature of service in the Red Army following World War II isn't enough to dampen his spirits. Instead, he keeps things lively by accompanying the base's chorus on his accordion, and by attempting to get women to join the chorus. He succeeds in both his aims. Not only that, but he also has romantic chemistry with one of the female singers (Irina Rozanova). Unfortunately for him, she is the live-in lover of his boss, Col. Vinogradov (Valentin Gaft).

== Cast ==
- Valentin Gaft as Colonel Vinogradov
- Irina Rozanova as Lyuba Antipova
- Yevgeny Mironov as Lieutenant Vladimir Poletaev
- Elena Yakovleva as Anya Kryukova
- Sergey Nikonenko as Captain Ivan Kryukov
- Larisa Malevannaya as Vinogradov's wife
- Andrey Ilin as sergeant
- Vladimir Ilyin as Captain Liкhovol, intendant
- Lyudmila Gnilova as Barkhatova
- Stanislav Govorukhin as divisional commander

== Production ==
"I made a film about love. About a Lieutenant, who fell in love with a Colonel's young and beautiful wife. The Colonel' s got two wives: the first from the pre-war times and the second whom he met in the war and fell head over heels. Pangs of conscience, painful doubts, sidelong glances. Only shot in the head can cleave this knot.", says director Pyotr Todorovsky.
