= Siris (band) =

American music duo

SIRIS 赛日
- SIRIS - Patrick and Michael Maley

Background information
- Origin: Philadelphia, United States
- Genres: Rock; Progressive rock Alternative rock Pop
- Years active: 1995–present
- Label: Run Hard Music The Orchard
- Members: Michael Maley; Patrick Maley
- Website: sirismusic.com

SIRIS is the name of American music duo Michael Maley and Patrick Maley. Their name SIRIS was derived from two Chinese words "sai" 赛 and "ri" 日, meaning to surpass the sun. Hailing from the city of Philadelphia, the brothers are best known as the only western band in the world performing and composing their own original English and Chinese language songs.

== The beginning ==
The brothers began singing and writing music at an early age. During their teenage years they performed in local bands throughout the city of Philadelphia. Some of their major influences included Genesis, Sting, U2 and Tears for Fears. In 1992, shortly after graduating highschool, Michael Maley moved to China to pursue his studies in Chinese at China's prestigious Fudan University. During that time, younger brother Patrick remained in America and continued his pursuit of music as a drummer.

== Chinese Influence ==
Siris' Chinese inspired music is due in large part to Michael's experiences in China. While living in China, he not only studied at Fudan but also worked as an English teacher and Chinese/English translator. Michael's fluency in Chinese and strong martial arts background helped him gain notoriety in TV commercials and films. In 1994 he was featured in the Hong Kong produced martial arts movie The Green Hornet. After his initial four-year stay in China, Michael returned to America and reunited with his brother Patrick. In 1996, the brothers returned to their musical roots and formed the band Siris. They adopted a unique multi-cultural approach to making music by melding influences from the east and west.

== Professional Career Highlights ==
=== 1997 to 1999 ===
Beginning with their 1997 debut Chinese EP entitled, "Till My Last Breath" (直到我最后一息) SIRIS became the first Western group in music history to record an original Chinese language album. The album was co-produced by Grammy nominated producer David Ivory. In 1998 the brothers moved to Taiwan and Mainland China to promote the new album. Breaking new ground in the Chinese market would prove difficult. After a modicum of success in Asia, they returned to the United States in 1999.

=== 2000 to 2003 ===
The year 2000 was a turning point for SIRIS as the brothers returned to the studio to record their first English album "The Order Of Time". That same year, they also formed their own record label and production company, "Run Hard Music". "The Order of Time" was a very progressive offering that stayed true to their musical roots. The album also managed to celebrate their Chinese influences, containing many Chinese references throughout. These references were evident on both the packaging and on three of the albums twelve tracks; including the progressive title track "The Order of Time", "Ma Ma Hu Hu" and their Chinese single "Beautiful Angel" 美丽的天使. "The Order of Time" was officially released and distributed worldwide in February 2001. While the record industry was facing new challenges from music downloads and online file sharing, Siris seized a new opportunity. On the strength of their English single, "My Love For You Will Always Be" and the albums' lone Chinese track "Beautiful Angel" 美丽的天使, SIRIS quickly jumped to the top of MP3.com's top 40 pop chart. "Beautiful Angel" broke the top 20, reaching number 11 and became the first Chinese song in MP3.com's history to enter the charts. After more than 2 million downloads, 100,000 units sold and a string of successful performances, Siris' critically acclaimed English debut was an independent success. In 2002, Music legend Adrian Belew commented, "It's nice to hear something refreshing in a world of similar artists!" In 2003, Siris once again took part in breaking new ground as their Chinese single "Beautiful Angel" became the first Chinese song to be sold on Apple's iTunes.

=== 2004 to 2007 ===
In 2004, SIRIS went back into the studio to focus on new Chinese material. In 2005, they released the Chinese EP "Xing Fu". The album received widespread critical acclaim and helped solidify their unique place in music history. In late 2005, a successful promotional tour of Mainland China, Taiwan and the United States followed. On the strength of their hit single "Xing Fu" 幸福, SIRIS was heavily featured by major U.S. and Chinese media throughout 2005 and 2006. ABC News stated: "SIRIS is certainly breaking down cultural barriers between east and west... these two guys from the City of Brotherly Love may just change the world of Rock!" MTV described SIRIS' music as "Magical!" and stated "They should be embraced because there is sincerity in their work." In 2006 SIRIS was invited to perform at several high-profile television events including the Phoenix Television Chinese New Year Global Gala and the groundbreaking MTV Chi Rocks! Concert, celebrating MTV's strong push into the Chinese market. SIRIS debuted several music videos of their hit songs: starring MTV Chi VJ, Angel Tang in "Shi Shi Me Dao Li" 是什么道理 ("What's the Reason") and "Xing Fu" 幸福 in 2007. Since its release, Xing Fu has been downloaded over 25 million times. In 2007, SIRIS announced the release of a brand new full length Chinese language album entitled "我们都一样" (We're All The Same). The new album was released in North America and became the first half of their planned double Chinese/English album release for 2008.

=== 2008 ===
On August 8, 2008 - just in time for the Beijing Olympics, SIRIS announced the release of its brand new "double" Chinese- and English-language album, "8". The new album included 20 original Chinese and English songs. Prominent singles featured in the release are "God Bless Sichuan", "I Was Chinese in My Previous Life", "China", "A Trip To Nowhere", and "You'll Be Okay." The Mandarin single "God Bless Sichuan" was pre-released on July 1, 2008 as a tribute to the survivors of the tragic Sichuan earthquake on May 12, 2008. The song features renowned mainland Chinese Erhu soloist, Qin Qian. In 2008, "God Bless Sichuan" became the No. 1-played song on mainland China's most popular video-sharing Web site, Youku.com. To date, the song remains one of the top 15 all time downloaded songs on China's Youku.com, with over 20 million downloads. The band's 2008 offering was its fifth studio album and the first full-length "double" Chinese- and English-language album ever released. The album was made available for free on the band's official Chinese Web site. Shortly after the album release, SIRIS announced plans to tour Asia and North America. The band also made an announcement that all proceeds from physical album sales and portions of tour revenue would go to the Sichuan earthquake disaster relief.

=== 2009 to 2011 ===
In 2009 SIRIS went through an unexpected transition. Michael Maley went solo with the SIRIS name after brother Patrick became ill. While Patrick recovered, Michael continued to perform extensively in the Chinese market, making several television appearances, including an emotional performance at the "Love Across The Pacific" benefit concert commemorating the one year anniversary of the Sichuan earthquake in San Francisco. In 2010, Michael, now exclusively performing publicly as SIRIS, embarked on a successful promotional and concert tour of Mainland China. Although the brothers still collaborated, Patrick decided to no longer participate in live performing due to health concerns. Now referred to by international fans as SIRIS, Michael continued to perform at high-profile events throughout China, including the Sheng Tai Zhong Guo concert aired nationwide and the Second Annual Mainland China Cartoon and Animation Festival in Dong Guan China. The concert was aired live on CCTV. It was performed in front of 200,000 fans and watched by over 400 million viewers on live TV. It was at this show that SIRIS unveiled his new single "Dream Goddess" in a collaborative performance with talented young singer Wang Huan. SIRIS successfully toured 15 cities in 2010 and performed at select shows in the US during 2011. In late 2011 SIRIS was invited as a celebrity judge and performer for the Third Annual China-Paris International Modeling Contest in Beijing. Upon wrapping up a 2-year stay in China, SIRIS returned to the US to prepare for a new album release.

=== 2012 to 2015 ===
In 2012 SIRIS re-mastered and re-released the album "8", specifically targeting the US market and featuring the singles "A Trip To Nowhere" and "You'll Be Okay". In 2013, SIRIS re-released "God Bless Sichuan" to mark the fifth anniversary of the Sichuan earthquake, embarking on an extensive fund raising promotion to support families afflicted by the 2008 disaster. From 2012 to 2014 SIRIS cohosted a popular Chinese language radio program called "Lunch Break" with award-winning KTSF television host Keyi Chang. The weekly program was broadcast on San Francisco's KSJO 92.3 FM on Tuesday's and Friday's at 4pm PST. The talk show featured top 40 Chinese music and special celebrity guests from around the globe. Although the show officially stopped airing in 2014 it is periodically broadcast to promote special events across the Bay Area. After a short hiatus from recording and performing in 2014, SIRIS returned to the studio to record new material in 2015."

=== 2016 to 2019 ===
From 2016 to 2018 SIRIS produced new music for two forthcoming albums. In May 2019 they officially announced plans for these releases via their website. In June 2019 they also released two new instrumentals, Fei Tian 飞天 and Yan Guo Chang Kong 雁过长空.

=== 2020 to 2024 ===
In late 2020, SIRIS recorded the smooth jazz ballad "April Showers," which was officially released in the spring of 2021. Aside from the typical contributions of the Maley brothers, the song featured Andy Rampula on saxophone and Doug Bossi on guitar.

In 2022, SIRIS released their rendition of "Jingle Bells," titled "Jazzy Jingle Bells," during the Christmas season. During this period, they also released revamped versions of two pop classics on YouTube: Tears for Fears' "Mad World" and The Bee Gees' "New York Mining Disaster 1941."

In 2023, SIRIS officially released "Philadelphia," a heartfelt ode to their hometown, which was originally recorded 15 years earlier but remixed and remastered for the updated release.

2023 also saw them reissue a remixed and remastered version of their critically acclaimed 2005 album, "幸福" ("Xing Fu").

On January 12, 2024, SIRIS released their rendition of The Bee Gees' hit song "New York Mining Disaster 1941," paying homage to the Gibb brothers and the Bee Gees' legacy.

On January 19, 2024, SIRIS released a previously recorded 1997 single, "永遠珍惜你的愛" (Forever Cherishing Your Love). The Mandarin Chinese language ballad, originally released on their debut Chinese album of the same name, was enhanced and remastered for the official release.

On December 12, 2024, SIRIS also released an instrumental titled "Mystic Highway (Looking For Linderman)". The song blends elements of modern rock with traditional Chinese instruments such as the erhu and guzheng. An official press release by the band claims the song title pays homage to the 1980 movie "My Bodyguard".

== Other Projects and collaborations ==
In 2018 Michael Maley wrote and published a new Chinese language book penned under the SIRIS name, titled: "Spiritual Wisdom - A Guidebook To Life" The book depicts many of his life experiences which include stories of his time living in China.

In 2020 the music of SIRIS was featured in the NetFlix Japanese reality series “Terrace House: Opening New Doors”. The songs "You Are", "我就是你的爱", and "A Trip To Nowhere" were featured in Season 2 – Episode 12 “If Only You Were Five Years Younger”.

In 2021, SIRIS composed and recorded songs for the A&E Original Biography "Kisstory" featuring the career of the rock band Kiss.

In 2024, Patrick Maley wrote and published a new book titled "The Rhythm of Life." The book is an instructional guide on the art of drumming and the music business.

== Discography ==
- 直到我最后一息 - Till My Last Breath - Chinese (1997)
- The Order Of Time - English (2001)
- Martial Arts Channel - Sound Track (2003)
- 幸福 - Xing Fu - Chinese (2005)
- 我们都一样 - Chinese (2007)
- 上天祝福四川 (God Bless Sichuan) single - Chinese (2008)
- 8 - Chinese/English double album (2008)
- Dream Goddess - Chinese (2010)
- 8 - English album (2012) Re-mastered
- Fei Tian 飞天 (2019) Single
- Yan Guo Chang Kong 雁过长空 (2019) Single
- April Showers (2021) Single
- Jazzy Jingle Bells (2022) Single
- Philadelphia (2023) Single
- 雁過長空 / Across The Endless Horizon (2023) Single
- 幸福 - Xing Fu - Remastered Special Edition (2023) EP
- New York Mining Disaster (2024) Single
- Mystic Highway (Looking For Linderman) (2024) Single

== Side Projects & Credits ==
As a studio / touring drummer Patrick Maley has performed with accomplished acts such as: Little Richard, Three Dog Night, The Beach Boys, The Rip Chords, Mary Wilson of the Supremes and many others. Michael Maley established the company Run Hard Media which produces television programs and films for the Chinese market.
