= Sergei Mavrodi =

Russian financial fraudster (1955–2018)

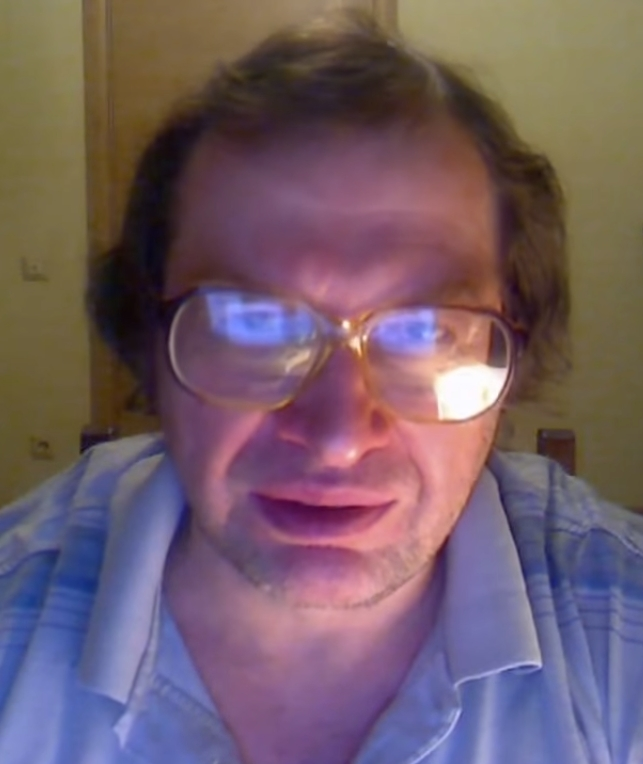
- Mavrodi in 2012
- Born: 11 August 1955; Moscow, Russian SFSR, Soviet Union
- Died: 26 March 2018 (aged 62); Moscow, Russia
- Known for: Russian financial fraudster and previously a deputy of the State Duma

Sergei Panteleevich Mavrodi (Russian: Серге́й Пантеле́евич Мавро́ди; 11 August 1955 – 26 March 2018) was a Russian financial fraudster, financial criminal and previously a deputy of the State Duma. He was the founder of the МММ, a scheme that defrauded millions of people around the globe.

In 2007, Mavrodi was convicted in a Russian court of defrauding 10,000 investors out of 110 million rubles ($4.3 million). Mavrodi claimed he was not the beneficiary of the donations and that he was not used to a flamboyant lifestyle. The charge of which he was later convicted was tax fraud though he claimed that the MMM scheme was not a business, but instead a mutual donation program against which there is no law. There were interviews after his release where he claimed MMM Global was behind the bitcoin price rally.

== Early life ==
Mavrodi was born a Russian with Greek and Ukrainian descent in Moscow. During his childhood, he was diagnosed with a bilateral heart defect. Mavrodi recalled that in school, he was proficient in mathematics and physics. He studied at the Moscow State Institute of Electronics and Mathematics. In 1983, Soviet police detained him for ten days due to illegal economic activity.

== MMM activities ==
In 1989 Mavrodi founded MMM. He was then imprisoned on charges of financial fraud involving MMM.

In 1994 Mavrodi was elected deputy of State Duma obtaining parliamentary immunity, just three weeks after he was released from prison. He ran in a by-election in the Mytishchinsky District to replace deputy Andrey Aizderdzis, who was gunned down earlier that year. Mavrodi took nearly 27% of the votes with a turnout of only 30%.

Mavrodi declared MMM bankrupt on 22 December 1997, then disappeared, and was on the run until his arrest in 2003.

On 28 April 2007, a Moscow court sentenced him to four and a half years in a penal colony. The court also fined him 10,000 rubles ($390).

In January 2011, Mavrodi launched another pyramid scheme called MMM-2011, asking investors to buy so-called Mavro currency units. He frankly described it as a pyramid, adding "It is a naked scheme, nothing more ... People interact with each other and give each other money. For no reason!" Mavrodi said that his goal with MMM-2011 was to destroy the current financial system, which he considered unfair, which would allow something new to take its place. MMM-2011 was able to function openly as Ponzi schemes and financial pyramids are not illegal under Russian law. In May 2012 he froze the operation and announced that there would be no more payouts.

In 2011 he launched a similar scheme in India, called MMM India, again stating clearly that the vehicle was a pyramid. He has also launched MMM in China. He was reported to be trying to expand his operations into Western Europe, Canada, and Latin America. As of September 2015 it had spread rapidly in South Africa with a claimed 1% per day or 30% per month interest rate scheme and warnings from both the South African and Russian Communist Parties for people not to participate in it. In early 2016, he continued the same model in Zimbabwe (the accounts were frozen in September 2016), and later, in Nigeria (accounts frozen in December 2016). MMM Nigeria resumed activities on 13 January 2017.

== Stock Generation ==
In 1998 Mavrodi created Stock Generation, allegedly a classic pyramid scheme presented as a "virtual stock market game". The website ran from 1998 to early 2000. It was based around trading non-existent companies' stocks in a form of the "stock exchange game" on the company's site, stockgeneration.com. Despite a bold-letter warning on the main page that the site was not a real stock exchange, between 20,000 and 275,000 people, according to various estimates, fell for the promised 200% returns and lost their money. According to U.S. Securities and Exchange Commission (SEC), losses of victims were at least US$5.5 million. The Massachusetts district court initially found that U.S. Securities and Exchange Commission was unable to cite Stock Generation's founders and owners for securities violations. However, the United States Court of Appeals reversed this decision in 2001, concluding that the SEC alleged sufficient facts to state a triable claim. In 2003 the SEC obtained permanent injunctions against SG Ltd. and relief defendants SG Perfect and SG Trading, which profited from the disbursement of funds fraudulently gained by SG Ltd.

== Death ==
Mavrodi died of heart problems at the age of 62 at a hospital in Moscow. The funeral was funded by the investors of МММ-2011.

== Book ==
In 2008 Mavrodi published the book Temptation. In May 2008, bailiffs arrested Mavrodi's rights to this book. Seven thousand copies of the book were published.

== Film ==
A feature film The PyraMMMid, based on the story of the same name by Mavrodi was released in Russia on 7 April 2011. The role of Sergei Mavrodi (in the film he is called Sergei Mamontov) is played by Aleksei Serebryakov.

== Theater ==
His play was performed in theatres. The director of the play was Maria Kuznetsova.

== Other media ==
Mavrodi was depicted as a non-playable character in the 2011 video game Postal III, owning the arcade in the north of the city of Catharsis.
