= Balashikha constituency =

Russian legislative constituency

Balashikha single-member constituency
- Constituency of the Russian State Duma
- Deputy: Sergey Yurov; United Russia
- Federal subject: Moscow Oblast
- Districts: Balashikha, Reutov
- Voters: 458,814 (2026)

The Balashikha constituency (No.118 (Note: No.117 in 2016–2026)) is a Russian legislative constituency in Moscow Oblast. The constituency covers north-eastern suburbs of Moscow, including the cities Balashikha and Reutov.

The constituency has been represented since 2026 by United Russia deputy Sergey Yurov, former mayor of Balashikha and Reutov, who won the open seat after one-term United Russia incumbent Vyacheslav Fomichyov successfully sought re-election on the party list.

== Boundaries ==
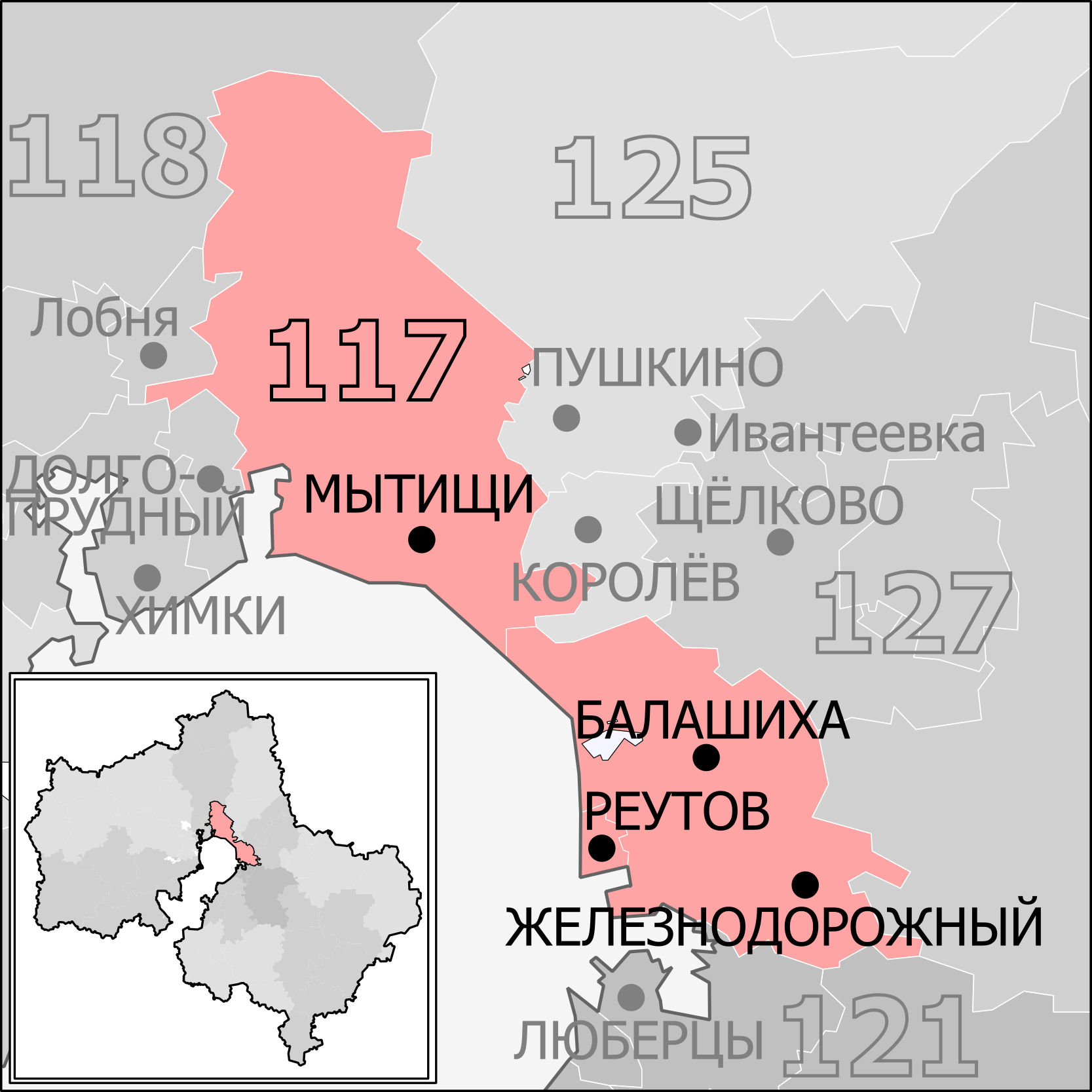
Constituency boundaries from 2016 to 2026

2016–2026: Balashikha, Mytishchi, Reutov
The constituency was created for the 2016 election to cover north-eastern Moscow suburbs from the former Mytishchi (Mytishchi) and Pushkino (Balashikha and Reutov) constituencies.

2026–present: Balashikha, Reutov
After 2025 redistricting the constituency was significantly altered, losing Mytishchi to the re-created Mytishchi constituency. Thus the seat was reconfigured to cover only inner eastern suburbs of Moscow.

== Members elected ==
Election	Member	Party
2016	Maksim Surayev	United Russia
2021	Vyacheslav Fomichyov	United Russia
2026	Sergey Yurov	United Russia

== Election results ==
=== 2016 ===
Summary of the 18 September 2016 Russian legislative election in the Balashikha constituency
Candidate	Party	Votes	%
Maksim Surayev	United Russia	118,132	52.39%
Oksana Krasikova	Communist Party	21,364	9.47%
Aleksey Mushin	Liberal Democratic Party	20,186	8.95%
Maksim Soshin	A Just Russia	14,735	6.53%
Natalya Blinova	Communists of Russia	11,363	5.04%
Dmitry Pavlenok	People's Freedom Party	8,193	3.63%
Anatoly Batashev	The Greens	8,059	3.57%
Vyacheslav Pivulsky	Party of Growth	7,523	3.34%
Margarita Svergunova	Rodina	6,959	3.09%
Total		225,498	100%

=== 2021 ===
Summary of the 17-19 September 2021 Russian legislative election in the Balashikha constituency
Candidate	Party	Votes	%
Vyacheslav Fomichyov	United Russia	139,827	46.15%
Oleg Zverev	Communist Party	46,899	15.48%
Dmitry Shinkarev	A Just Russia — For Truth	35,122	11.59%
Yulia Smirnova	Party of Pensioners	16,856	5.56%
Kleopatra Orlova	New People	16,223	5.35%
Mikhail Pshennov	Liberal Democratic Party	14,200	4.69%
Anton Vinogradov	Party of Growth	8,622	2.85%
Dmitry Polyakov	Russian Party of Freedom and Justice	7,166	2.37%
Aleksandr Khomazyuk	Rodina	4,780	1.58%
Total		302,953	100%

=== 2026 ===
Summary of the 18-20 September 2026 Russian legislative election in the Balashikha constituency
Candidate	Party	Votes	%
Sergey Yurov	United Russia	130,831	55.98%
Oleg Zverev	Communist Party	35,949	15.38%
Alla Khvastunova	New People	23,252	9.95%
Vladimir Sinyakin	Liberal Democratic Party	20,075	8.59%
Dmitry Shinkarev	A Just Russia	14,286	6.11%
Pyotr Popov	The Greens	3,638	1.56%
Yury Volkov	Rodina	2,729	1.17%
Vasily Fatigarov	Party of Pensioners	2,492	1.07%
Total		233,718	100%
