= MTV Chi =

Defunct American music television channel

Programming
- Picture format: 480i SDTV

Ownership
- Owner: Viacom International

History
- Launched: December 6, 2005; 19 years ago
- Closed: April 30, 2007; 18 years ago

Links
- Website: www.mtvchi.com

MTV Chi was a spin-off network from MTV targeted at young Chinese Americans, which ran from 2005 to 2007, as part of its MTV World division. The network featured various styles of music such as Mando pop, Canto pop and Chinese American hip hop. It broadcast in English and featured a mix of original programming with the best of MTV's International programming.

It launched on December 6, 2005, from MTV's studios in New York City. MTV Chi aimed to show the world what Asian American pop culture is all about, with music videos imported from Taiwan, Hong Kong and China as well as original programming showcasing up-and-coming artists in the United States and around the world. Jin's music video "Learn Chinese" was the first video ever to be played on MTV Chi.

On February 15, 2007, MTV Networks announced that MTV Chi would be shutting down. It ceased broadcasting on April 30, 2007.

== VJs ==
- Gregory Woo
- Angel Tang
- Simon Yin
- Xiao Wang

== Shows on MTV Chi ==
- Artist Profile
- Canton-In Chart
- Classic Chi
- J-K Music Non Stop
- Live From...
- Mandarin Top 20
- Maximum Chi
- MTV Chi News
- Music Wire News
- Top 10 Chi Countdown
- Untapped Chi
- WA KOW!

== MTV Chi Rocks! ==
MTV Chi Rocks was the first concert celebrating young Chinese Americans held in San Gabriel, CA on September 23. The concert featured the hottest names in Asian American music including Frequency5, Vienna Teng, Siris, Burning Tree Project, Kaila Yu, Adrienne Lau, Putnam Hall, and Far East Movement. Headlining the blowout event was Jin the Emcee and hip hop group Jeff and Machi.

== See also ==
- MTV
- MTV Asia
