= Run Hard Music =

American multimedia production company

- Founded: 2001
- Founder: Michael Maley, Patrick Maley
- Genre: Various
- Country of origin: U.S.
- Location: Philadelphia, Pennsylvania
- Official website: www.runhardmedia.com

Run Hard Music is an American multimedia production company based in Philadelphia. It is run by its parent company, Run Hard Media, and was founded in 2001 by brothers Michael and Patrick Maley of the music group SIRIS in an effort to promote and produce independent music. Since its founding, RHM has expanded operations to include multimedia production services that include video and music production.

== Artists ==
- SIRIS
- Tim Kraus

== See also ==
- List of record labels
