= Adrienne Lau =

American singer (born 1983)

- 劉晨芝
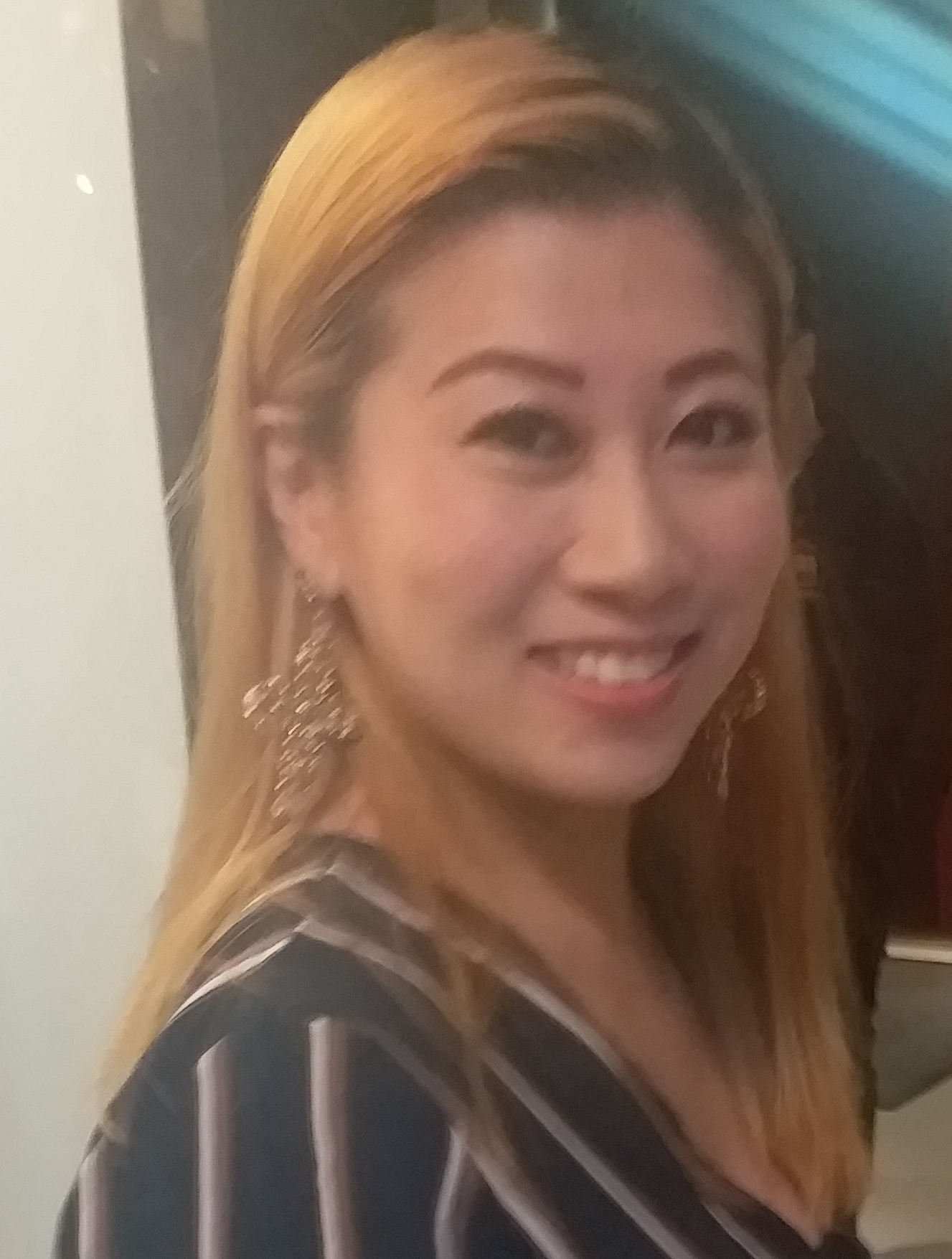
- Born: 7 September 1983 (age 43); Nga Wing Lau
- Other name: Asian Janet Jackson or Beyoncé
- Education: University of California, Los Angeles
- Known for: singing

Adrienne Lau (born 7 September 1983) is an Asian-American singer, actress and TV personality. She is the first Chinese-American female singer to reach the Top 20 on the U.S. Pop Billboard Sales Chart. Lau is the executive producer and a main cast member of the seven-episode English reality show 'Crazy Celeb Social' on Amazon Prime.

== Early life ==
Born in Hong Kong in 1983, Lau grew up splitting her time between Hong Kong and Los Angeles. She speaks English, Cantonese, and Mandarin.

Lau graduated from the University of California, Los Angeles with a double major in Communications and Sociology.

== Career ==
Lau participated in an advertising campaign and was the spokesmodel for Vigoss Jeans in China. In January 2005, her debut album, Hypnotic, was released. Her first single, "Hypnotic Love," features Jin tha MC and the single's music video includes an appearance by Mike Tyson. Additionally, Lau collaborated with Mýa, who produced the song "Xtacy" in the album. Lau performed at the MTV Chi Rocks concert for MTV Chi in September 2006. In December 2006, she performed on The V Party for Channel V in Singapore. In March 2007, Lau made an appearance in the Bangkok International Fashion Week in Thailand with a performance on the catwalk.

In 2008, Lau sang the song "Olympics Beijing" ("Ao Yun Beijing") for the 2008 Summer Olympics.

In 2010, she released her single "Coming" in Hong Kong. The single ranked number one on the HMV Charts. She started a fashion business, a restaurant, and bar businesses in Hong Kong. Hosting TV shows in Hong Kong, Lau invited her K-Pop star friends to appear on her show Seoul Stars, which she hosted for TVB.

Adrienne is the actress and co Executive Producer of the movie 'The Card Counter', executive produced by Martin Scorsese starring Oscar Issac, which premiered in the Venice Film Festival.

== Controversy surrounding MIG Records and Henry Jones ==
In the early 2000s, Lau received a record deal from Henry Jones of MIG Records (later renamed to Global Village Records). Jones used the proceeds from Tri Energy to fund his MIG Records enterprise. The U.S. Securities and Exchange Commission (SEC) filed a suit against Henry Jones and argued successfully that Jones was operating Tri Energy as a Ponzi scheme. Although Jones (sentenced to 20 years in prison) claimed Lau had nothing to do with the scheme and that usage of Lau's bank account was just an innocent mistake, Lau was named a Relief Defendant and ordered to pay a disgorgement of $200,000 plus prejudgment interest of $20,000.

== Videography ==
- Hypnotic Love
- Magic Tricks
- You're The One
