= Vyacheslav Fomichyov =

Russian politician (born 1965)

- Вячеслав Фомичев
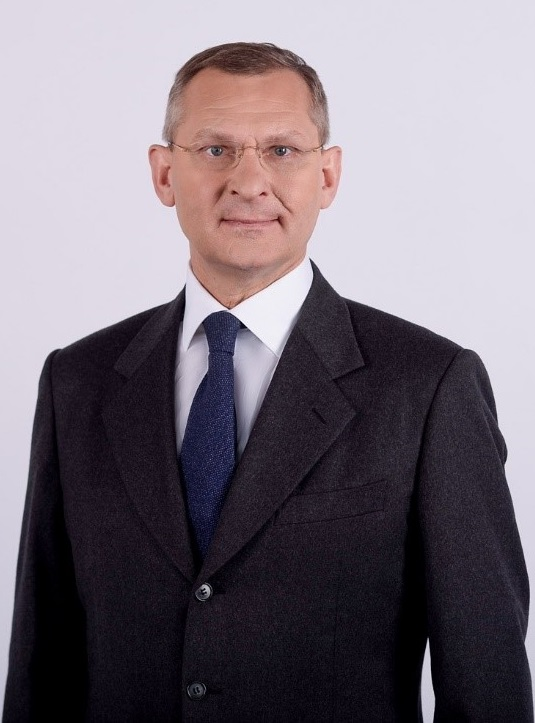

Member of the State Duma for Moscow Oblast
- Incumbent
- Assumed office 12 October 2021
- Preceded by: Maksim Surayev
- Constituency: Balashikha (No. 117)

Deputy of the 6th Moscow Oblast Duma
- In office 18 September 2016 – 18 September 2021

Personal details
- Born: 26 April 1965 (age 61) Saransk, Mordovian ASSR, Russian SFSR, USSR
- Party: United Russia
- Spouse: married
- Children: two sons and two daughters
- Education: Suvorov Military School

Vyacheslav Vasilievich Fomichyov (Russian: Вячесла́в Васи́льевич Фомичёв; born 26 April 1965, Saransk, Mordovian Autonomous Soviet Socialist Republic) is a Russian politician and a deputy of the 8th State Duma.

== Biography ==
Vyacheslav Fomichev was born on April 26, 1965, in Saransk.

=== Education ===
He received a military and legal education.

=== Career ===
In 1982—1993, he served in the Russian Army in command positions. After that, he worked as a lawyer in several companies.

From 2001 to 2004, he was the Head of the General Directorate for Production and Circulation of Alcoholic Products of the Moscow Oblast. In 2004-2006 he headed the Committee on Consumer Market of the Moscow Oblast.

In 2006, Fomichyov was appointed the Minister of Consumer Market and Services for Moscow Oblast.

From 2016 to 2021, he was a deputy of the Moscow Oblast Duma of the 6th convocation. Since September 2021, he has been a deputy of the 8th State Duma.

=== Sanctions ===
He was sanctioned by the UK government in 2022 in relation to Russo-Ukrainian War.

=== Family ===
Vyacheslav Fomichev is married and has two sons and two daughters.

=== Preservation of cultural heritage ===
Vyacheslav Fomichev is actively engaged in the restoration of cultural heritage sites. To date, four museums have already been created in the Moscow Oblast.

== Awards ==
- Order "For Personal Courage"
