= Margarita Zhukova =

Russian educator and scientist (1929–2010)

Margarita Georgievna Zhukova
- Маргарита Георгиевна Жукова
- Born: 6 June 1929; Minsk, Byelorussian SSR, Soviet Union
- Died: 13 May 2010 (aged 80); Moscow, Russia
- Education: Moscow State University
- Occupations: Educator, scientist
- Parents: Georgy Zhukov (father); Maria Nikolaevna Volokhova (mother)

Margarita Georgievna Zhukova (Russian: Маргарита Георгиевна Жукова; 6 June 1929 – 13 May 2010) was a Soviet and Russian educator and scientist.

She was also a member of the Russian Union of Journalists and wrote many publications about her father, Marshal Georgy Zhukov.

== Biography ==
Margarita Georgievna Zhukova was born in Minsk on 6 June 1929. Her mother was Maria Nikolaevna Volokhova (1897—1983), and her father was future Marshal of the Soviet Union Georgy Zhukov. Her parents weren't married, but both of them are mentioned in the birth certificate of their daughter.

In 1948, Zhukova entered the Law Faculty of Moscow State University and graduated from there in 1953. At the same time she graduated from a school at Moscow State University where teachers of political economy were trained. After her graduation she started working in the Department of Political Economy at Moscow Power Engineering Institute. Over the next 35 years she spent nine years at the Power Engineering Institute and 26 years at the Moscow Metallurgical Institute, where she was an associate professor. From 1963, she was a member of the educational society "Znanie" (Knowledge). From 1974, she was engaged in military work.

In August 1993, at its inaugural meeting, Zhukova was elected president of Marshal Zhukov Foundation. She was also a leader of the movement "Russia and Life". In 1994, she took part in an Orthodox pilgrimage mission on the frigate "Druzhba", where she read a lecture about her father.

In November 1999, she was registered as a candidate for membership in the State Duma in Mytishchi constituency as an independent candidate. She was a Laureate of Marshal of the Soviet Union Georgy Zhukov State Prize of the Russian Federation.

Margarita Zhukova died in Moscow on 13 May 2010.
