= Tyulpany =

Spring Blossoms
- Directed by: Anna Kuznetsova; Yuliya Lysova; Yuliya Uzkikh; Vladislav Ikonnikov; Yury Korobeynikov
- Written by: Mariya Orlova; Elena Khanova; Irina Karpusheva; Evgeniya Bogomyakova; Dmitry Pinchukov; Roman Nepomniachtchi
- Produced by: Maria Zatulovskaya; Lala Rustamova; Timur Asadov; Ara Khachatryan; Yana Shmaylova; Konstantin Mayor; Yuliya Uzkikh; Maria Melenevskaya; Olga Yuntunen
- Starring: Elena Yakovleva; Aleksey Serebryakov; Varvara Shcherbakova; Slava Kopeykin; Aleksandra Babaskina; Yaroslav Mogilnikov; Yuliya Topolnitskaya; Vyacheslav Chepurchenko; Gosha Kutsenko; Irina Medvedeva
- Narrated by: Sergey Bezrukov
- Cinematography: Stepan Beshkurov; Ivan Solomatin; Daniil Tuzhenkov; Anton Mikhaylovskiy
- Edited by: Marcel Shamshulin; Anastasia Marchukova; Timofey Shalaev; Olesya Shepelevich
- Music by: Arsen Baderkhan
- Production companies: Bazelevs Production; Red Pepper Film; NMG Studio
- Distributed by: NMG Film Distribution
- Release date: March 5, 2026 (Russia)
- Running time: 89 minutes
- Country: Russia
- Language: Russian

Spring Blossoms (Russian: Тюльпаны, romanized: Tyulpany, lit. 'Tulips') is a 2026 Russian romantic comedy-drama film directed by Anna Kuznetsova, Yuliya Lysova, Yuliya Uzkikh, Vladislav Ikonnikov, and Yury Korobeynikov about ordinary people and the country's main spring holiday, March 8th.

The leading roles were played by Elena Yakovleva, Aleksei Serebryakov, Varvara Shcherbakova, Slava Kopeykin, Aleksandra Babaskina, Yaroslav Mogilnikov, Yuliya Topolnitskaya, Vyacheslav Chepurchenko, Gosha Kutsenko, and Irina Medvedeva in a film about love, women, and the power of small gestures.

This film was theatrically released on March 5, 2026.

== Plot ==
What is March 8th? It’s spring, the sun, tulips, mom’s smile and the anticipation of falling in love and happiness. There is also a fuss, congratulations, queues in shops, flowers and an endless race for gifts. Every year, on this day, there is a global collapse in which everything is dedicated to women. The most ordinary people who face extraordinary situations, and unplanned meetings radically change their lives.

== Cast ==
- Elena Yakovleva as Tamara
- Aleksey Serebryakov as Grisha
- Varvara Shcherbakova as Varya
- Slava Kopeykin as Misha
- Aleksandra Babaskina as Stasya
- Yaroslav Mogilnikov as Kostya
- Yuliya Topolnitskaya as Sveta
- Vyacheslav Chepurchenko as Dima
- Gosha Kutsenko as Artyom
- Irina Medvedeva as Olga
- Anna Ukolova as Shura
- Nikolay Kolyada as Maxim
- Galina Stakhanova as Artyom's mother

== Production ==
Filming took place in Kaliningrad, Saint Petersburg, Novorossiysk, Yekaterinburg, and Krasnoyarsk.
