= MMM Global =

Ponzi scheme launched in 2011

MMM Global (also known as МММ-2011 / МММ-2012) is a Ponzi scheme launched in 2011 by Sergei Mavrodi, with subsidiaries in different countries. MMM Global is a new avatar of the Russian company MMM, also created by Mavrodi and which operated from 1989 to 2004. The difference between the two is that MMM Global targets developing countries. MMM Global became widely popular in various African countries such as South Africa, Nigeria, Zimbabwe, Kenya and Ghana, with some attributing this popularity to poverty and poor government regulation or law enforcement.

== History ==
=== South Africa ===
In 2000, MMM began operating in South Africa with the same business model as MMM-2014, claiming a "30% per month" return through a "social financial network". The group was identified as a possible pyramid scheme by the National Consumer Commission and accounts of clients were later frozen by Capitec Bank. In response to mounting criticism and official investigations by state authorities in 2016, supporters of the South African MMM scheme staged a protest march in Johannesburg. A few South African banks started shutting down accounts linked to MMM.

=== Nigeria ===
In November 2015, MMM launched a website targeting the Nigerian audience, also claiming a "30% per month" return including other acquirable bonuses. The entity was self-described as a "mutual aid fund where ordinary people help each other." 2.4 million people had signed up by late 2016, with the country's unemployed as primary targets. Nigeria's Economic and Financial Crimes Commission confirmed that it was monitoring the scheme.

On 13 December, shortly after celebrating its first anniversary amid a festive mood from some members, MMM Nigeria announced the freezing of all members' accounts due to what it called "systems overload and the negative attention brought on by the Government and mass media". This led to wide spread panic in the nation and even attempted suicides. On 14 December, LASEMA (Lagos State Emergency Management Agency) of Lagos State pleaded with Lagosians to dial their emergency number if they spotted anyone trying to commit suicide. LASEMA took this action due to the number of suicides MMM caused in Russia.

In 2017, the Redeemed Christian Church of God (RCCG) in Nigeria warned all members against participating in the MMM scheme.

By January 2017, hundreds of other similar Ponzi schemes jumped into the ever-widening Ponzi industry in Nigeria, amid reports that MMM had crashed in December 2016. These schemes include ABCDonor, Twinkas, and Ultimate Cycler, with rates offered up to 200%.

MMM Nigeria reopened on 13 January 2017, but has been plagued by grievances from participants concerning delayed or unfulfilled payments. This has been attributed to spiraling fear sweeping amongst participants, some of whom have moved to new Ponzi schemes.

On 11 February 2017, MMM Nigeria announced the lifting of withdrawal limits on the 2017 mavro (i.e. mavros paid for in 2017 could be withdrawn without limits) while no specific limit for the 2016 mavro was stated. This aimed to encourage new participants to enter, giving old members some assurance of getting back their money. However, this has not allayed the fears of some old members especially after MMM informed them that to get back their pre-2017 money they should add more money, and the more money they add, the better the chances of recovering their previous funds in the scheme. In its tweets, MMM claimed that programmers would work towards implementing the release of thrice the amount paid in as new contribution from the old mavros. The tweets however did not say when this would be done.

MMM Nigeria had made some charity and humanitarian donations in Nigeria such as donations to internally displaced people's camps and hospitalized patients, but critics hold that this is a stunt to regain credibility after disappointing existing investors whose money got stuck in the scheme. This strategy of image-cleaning, according to critics, seeks to hoodwink and attract new unsuspecting recruits and use their money to pay off the stranded existing investors.

Ponzi schemes rely on new contributions to pay existing contributors which make them unreliable since it cannot continue attracting new contributions forever in the required numbers and rates (numbers which accelerate quickly at exponential rates with every new level of recruitment). Even if the whole population becomes participants this shows there is a limit beyond which no further recruitment is possible or recruitment begins to slow down sharply enough to cripple the scheme's paying ability. Therefore, the scheme is ultimately doomed to fail and it is only a matter of when, not if.

Some believers in MMM however adopt varying responses to critics; "After all nothing lasts forever", "MMM is an insurance company without guarantee or insurance" hence citing many public listed companies, pension/mutual funds that did not pay back anything to investors, "it is a gamble, so no guarantees", "It is a Communist ideology the capitalist will not understand".

In view of the rumoured suicides of victims and financial losses to victims of up to 18 billion Naira (or $60 million as of March 2017), questions have been raised about why there has not been a serious media or government effort to push back against the faceless new schemes multiplying in Nigeria on a daily basis, as most of these barely last more than three months with consequent heavy distress to many. It is still not clear to many participants how the media come about the figure of losses. Many old participants still believe that all contributions were made to and for fellow participants. Hence it should not be counted as a loss as the terms of association is clear, "Mutual Donation Aid". On 22 February 2017, MMM Nigeria released a news through personal office, that all the suggestions of the participants will be considered for implementation: all bonuses acquired in 2016 will be frozen and the growth of 2016 30% mavro stopped.

=== Zimbabwe ===
In July 2015, MMM East Africa, launched subsidiary "MMM Global Zimbabwe" targeting the Zimbabwe population. MMM offered its participants "30% per month" return on all investments. It soon became widely popular in urban areas of Zimbabwe. The Reserve Bank of Zimbabwe warned its citizens to stay clear of the program as it could be a fraudulent scheme. In September 2016, MMM Global Zimbabwe issued a freeze on all accounts, speculations suggest that this occurred due to a fall in number of participants. On 5 September 2016, all MMM accounts were unfrozen, and members were encouraged by MMM to continue "investing" their money, however the MMM unfreeze came with a catch; members would get an 80% loss of their available funds should they decide to withdraw their funds. This made some participants let their funds remain in the program while others withdrew their funds to suffer an 80% loss of their money "invested". This affected 66,000 Zimbabweans and caused some economic instability.

=== China ===
The scheme began in China in 2013 and collapsed in early 2016. In January 2016, the Chinese government banned MMM on the grounds that it was a pyramid scheme and was not registered in the country (since a fraudulent scheme cannot be registered).

=== Ghana ===
In November 2016, MMM was launched in Ghana.

=== Kenya ===
In October 2019, it was reported that MMM entered Kenya and opened a local subsidiary. MMM Kenya offers similar terms to participants as in other countries, including a monthly 30% interest rate to contributors to the scheme.

In December 2016, the Central Bank of Kenya (CBK), without mentioning MMM Kenya, issued a warning that "virtual currencies such as bitcoins are not legal tender in Kenya" It further said "no protection exists in the event that the platform that exchanges or holds the virtual currency fails or goes out of business."

The entry of MMM Kenya has raised fears of a replay of misfortunes that hit Kenyans in 2007 when 148,784 investors lost 8 billion, Ksh to 270 fraudulent pyramids and ponzis. A parliamentary report indicated that there was a spate of suicides, stress-related illnesses and family breakups as a result of the losses and directors of the companies stashed some of the proceeds in tax havens such as in Panama.

In April 2017, CBK warned the public against investing money in pyramids and unlicensed financial institutions, noting that there was a big comeback of new creations of pyramids. It said " “Such entities entice members of the public to place money with them and promise quick and abnormally high returns on their money or acquisition of non-existent properties.”

=== Brazil ===
In December 2015, it was reported that MMM entered Brazil and opened a local subsidiary. MMM Brazil offers similar terms to participants as in other countries, including a monthly interest rate of 50% for contributors to the scheme.

=== Other countries ===
MMM has also been reported to have been operating in several other countries until 2016, such as India, Thailand, Philippines, Japan, Australia, Turkey and Indonesia.

== See also ==
- MMM (Ponzi scheme company)
