= Vladimir Permyakov =

Russian actor (born 1952)

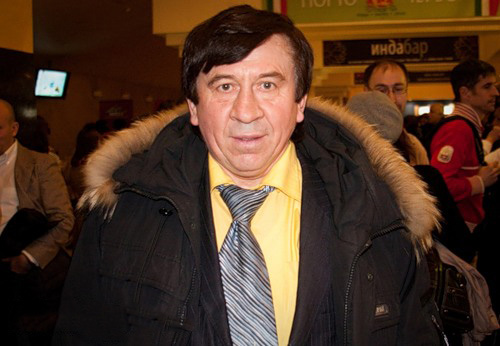
Vladimir Permyakov

Vladimir Sergeevich Permyakov (Russian: Влади́мир Серге́евич Пермяко́в; born December 2, 1952, in Kansk) is a Russian actor, known for his part as Lyonya Golubkov in a notorious MMM commercial. He also starred in several Russian films and TV series.
