= CNGN =

Nigerian stablecoin

cNGN (short for compliant Naira) is a Nigerian stablecoin pegged 1:1 to the Nigerian Naira (₦).

cNGN is issued under the 2025 Investments and Securities Act, which grants the Securities and Exchange Commission (SEC) of Nigeria authority over digital assets, while the Central Bank of Nigeria (CBN) retains oversight of payment systems.

== Issuance and governance ==
cNGN is designed to mirror the value of the Nigerian Naira on blockchain networks, providing a digital representation of the currency to facilitate instant payments, cross-border remittances, decentralized finance transactions, and Naira-denominated digital commerce. It is considered Africa’s first regulated stablecoin. However, the cNGN is intended to complement, and not substitute the eNaira. Unlike the eNaira, which is developed solely by the Central Bank of Nigeria, the cNGN is managed by a private entity.

cNGN is governed by WrappedCBDC Limited and operates under the oversight of the Securities and Exchange Commission (SEC) of Nigeria. WrappedCBDC Limited was admitted to the SEC's Regulatory Incubation Programme in August 2024 to test its cNGN stablecoin offering.
