= Kaila Yu =

American singer-songwriter

- Born: Elaine Yang; May 16, 1979 (age 47); Taipei, Taiwan
- Education: University of California, Los Angeles (BA)
- Occupations: Singer, songwriter, actress
- Website: kailayu.com

Kaila Yu is a Taiwanese American singer, songwriter, former model, and freelance journalist.

== Life ==
She was formerly the lead singer for the all-Asian-American, female rock band Nylon Pink. Yu is also one of the founders of the jewelry/fashion line "Hello Drama" which is affiliated with the Nylon Pink band and style.

She has also been an import model and appeared in magazines including Stuff Magazine, Maxim, FHM and House of Roses. Yu had a brief role as an Asian stripper in Dark Blue, appeared as a race girl in The Fast and the Furious: Tokyo Drift, and also hosted shows on channels such as MTV Asia, MTV Chi, Music Plus TV, TorqueTV, Octane TV and Ripe TV.

Yu is a graduate of UCLA (with a degree in economics), after transferring there from the University of California, San Diego, where she initially majored in biology.

== Works ==
- Wong, Kiki; Yu, Kaila (2019). 30-Day Travel Challenge: How To Make Your Travel Dreams A Reality. Amazon Digital Services . ISBN 978-1-7337676-0-6.
- Yu, Kaila (August 19, 2025). Fetishized. New York: Random House. ISBN 978-0-593-72801-7.
