= Andrey Aizderdzis =

Russian politician and deputy of the State Duma (1958–1994)

- Андрей Айздердзис
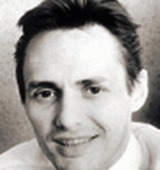

Member of the State Duma from Mytishchi constituency
- In office 12 December 1993 – 26 April 1994
- Preceded by: Constituency established
- Succeeded by: Sergei Mavrodi

Personal details
- Born: 29 October 1958 Khimki, Moscow Oblast, Russian SFSR, Soviet Union
- Died: 26 April 1994 (aged 35) Khimki, Moscow Oblast, Russia
- Party: Independent
- Children: 1
- Education: Moscow Topographical Politekhnikum

Andrey Dainisovich Aizderdzis (Russian: Андрей Дайнисович Айздердзис; also romanized Andrei Aizderdzis; 29 October 1958 – 26 April 1994) was a Russian politician and deputy of the State Duma. Aizderdzis was assassinated in 1994.

== Early life and education ==
Aizderdzis was born in Khimki on 29 October 1958. His mother was Russian and his father Latvian Dainis Aizderdzis. He graduated from Moscow Topographical Politekhnikum in 1982 with a degree in construction surveying.

== Career ==
Early on, Andrey Aizderdzis worked as a technician-surveyor at the Paper Industry Research Institute. later he worked as master, foreman and supervisor of construction site in the construction and assembly department.

In 1991 Aizderdzis founded International Business Corporation (MDK). In 1992 he was elected as chairman of the board of directors of MDK and chairman of the council of MDK-Bank.

Andrey Aizderdzis was one of the initiators of the creation of "Technology XXI" corporation. Aizderdzis also worked as a publisher at "Who is who" newspaper, which was created by journalists of national patriotic weekly newspaper "Literary Russia".

In 1993 Andrey Aizderdzis ran for State Duma in the Mytishchi constituency of Moscow Oblast. Aizderdzis faced 16 other opponents in the constituency. Despite running as an independent, Aizderdzis received an endorsement from the Civic Union. In the general election he won in the constituency with a plurality of just 9.23% of the vote (it is the second least result of a winning candidate in that election).

In the State Duma Andrey Aizderdzis joined New Regional Politics deputies' group. He also was appointed to the Subcommittee on Fuel and Energy Industry of the Committee on Industry, Construction, Transport and Energy.

== Death ==
On the evening of 26 April 1994, Aizderdzis was shot in Khimki, a suburb of Moscow. The investigation found that Aizderdzis paid for murder of local crime lord Viktor Burlachko (Burlak) in Khimki detention center, who had "protected" Aizderdzis and his businesses. As an act of vengeance, Burlachko's criminal organisation murdered Aizderdzis. A federal search warrant was issued on the actual assassin, Dmitry Mikhnenko, in 1994, but Mikhnenko is still not found. Four of his accomplices were charged in absentia.

A by-election in the Mytishchi constituency was held on 30 October. The by-election was won by Sergey Mavrodi.

== Personal life ==
Andrey Aizderdzis was married. He had a daughter.

Aizderdzis was an Orthodox Christian. Aizderzis's MDK-Corporation donated several million rubles to the Russian Orthodox Church.

Aizderdzis was a parliamentary republic supporter. He also opposed Gaidar's economic reforms and financed conservative Russian National Sobor of General Aleksandr Sterligov.

== See also ==
- List of members of the State Duma of Russia who died in office
