= MMM (Ponzi scheme company) =

1990s Russian Ponzi scheme company

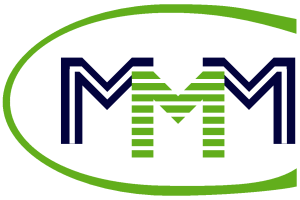
- Native name: Акционерное общество «МММ»
- Industry: Office Equipment importer (1989-early 1990s); Ponzi Scheme initiator (1992 onwards)
- Founded: 1989
- Founder: Sergei Mavrodi
- Defunct: 2004
- Fate: Shut down by Russian police in 1994, declared bankruptcy in 1997, reopened in 2011 as MMM Global
- Headquarters: Russia
- Key people: Sergei Mavrodi

МММ was a Russian company that, in the 1990s, operated one of the largest Ponzi schemes in the world. By different estimates, between 5 and 10 million people lost their savings. According to contemporary Western press reports, most investors were aware of the fraudulent nature of the scheme, but still hoped to profit from it by withdrawing money before it collapsed.

In 2011, the company re-opened as MMM Global.

== History ==
MMM was established in 1989 by Sergei Mavrodi, his brother Vyacheslav Mavrodi, and Olga Melnikova. The name of the company being the first letters of their surnames.

Initially, Mavrodi operated a network of computer-importing cooperatives. In January 1992, tax police accused MMM of tax evasion, leading to the collapse of MMM's internal bank, and causing the company to have difficulty obtaining financing to support its operations. Faced with difficulties in funding its foreign trade, the company switched to the financial sector. It offered American stocks to Russian investors, but met with little success. In December 1992, MMM-Invest was created as a voucher investment fund, a type of entity created to collect privatization vouchers. It was renamed Russ-Invest in May 1995, to distance it from the MMM scheme.

The MMM Ponzi scheme was launched in February 1994, promising annual returns of up to 3000%. The company started an aggressive TV ad campaign, spending 330 million rubles in March 1994. The ad campaign appealed to the general public by using "ordinary" characters that viewers could identify with. The most famous of them, a "folk hero" of early 1994, was Lyonya Golubkov. Another notable marketing effort was a giveaway of free Metro trips to all Moscow citizens on a particular day.

At its peak the company was taking in millions of US dollars each day from the sale of its shares to the public. Mavrodi reportedly owned enough cash to pack several rooms full with banknotes. The success of MMM in attracting investors led to the creation of other similar companies, including Tibet, Chara, Khoper-Invest, Selenga, Telemarket and Germes. All of these companies were characterised by aggressive television advertising and extremely high promised rates of return. One company promised annual returns of 30000%.

Regular publication in the media of the rising MMM share price led President Boris Yeltsin to issue a decree in June 1994 to protect investors from false advertising.

On 22 July 1994, the Ministry of Finance issued a statement listing MMM among a number of investment firms which had illegally issued unregistered securities. Thousands of investors protested in front of the company headquarters, prompting the intervention of riot police. By the next day, the firm was no longer operational. The company attempted to continue the scheme for a few days, and even issued new shares. As Russia did not have any laws against Ponzi schemes, the government decided to seek tax evasion charges. At that point, Invest-Consulting, one of the company's subsidiaries, owed more than 50 billion rubles in taxes (US$23 million in 1994), and MMM itself owed between 100 billion and 3 trillion rubles to the investors (from US$50 million to US$1.5 billion). MMM shares fell from 115,000 rubles to 1,000 rubles. In the aftermath, some investors reportedly threatened to set themselves on fire.

Several organisations of "investors" made efforts to recover their lost investments, but Sergei Mavrodi manipulated their indignation and directed it at the government. Mavrodi was arrested on tax evasion charges, unrelated to the MMM scheme, on 4 August 1994. Most shareholders blamed the government for their losses. A 'Union of Defense of the Rights of MMM Shareholders' emerged, attempting to collect the 1 million signatures required to hold a no-confidence referendum against Yeltsin's government. In October 1994 Mavrodi managed to win a by-election to replace Andrey Aizderdzis in the State Duma, and with it immunity from prosecution. Mavrodi claimed to be the victim of jealous bureaucrats, and that MMM shares would regain their value if he was elected. During the campaign he was supported by Vladimir Zhirinovsky, who hoped that Mavrodi would provide him with future financial backing. After being elected he appeared in the State Duma only once, to vote against an attempt to strip him of parliamentary immunity.

Mavrodi launched his own political party, the Party of People's Capital, but it was barred from registering after violating election laws. He decided to stage a protest against a decision, but this time only 200 people showed up. In October 1995, the Duma cancelled Mavrodi's right to immunity as a deputy. In 1996, he tried to run for Russia's presidency, but his bid was rejected after officials ruled that most of the signatures he submitted had been forged. MMM declared bankruptcy on September 22, 1997.

The original investigation was closed in 1997 for lack of evidence. The Prosecutor General's Office reopened the case in 1998, when Mavrodi was investigated for fraud and placed on an international wanted list. While it was believed that Sergei Mavrodi fled to Greece, he was ultimately arrested in Moscow, and investigators concluded that he probably never left the city.

Mavrodi was found and arrested in February 2003. While in custody, Mavrodi was given until 31 January 2006 to read the documents in his fraud case against him (the criminal case consisted of 650 volumes, each 250-270 pages long). At the end of April 2007, Mavrodi was convicted of fraud, and given a sentence of four-and-a-half years. Since he had already spent over four years in custody, he was released less than a month later, on 22 May 2007.

Though no longer current, MMM Bilets share certificates, which bear a resemblance to banknotes and formerly issued in ‘denominations’ of varying amounts, have gained some interest as collector's items.

The MMM scandal led to increased regulation of the Russian stock market, but the legacy of the fraud led many to become extremely suspicious of any joint stock companies.

== Fraud scheme in developing countries ==
From 2011, Mavrodi started targeting developing countries in Asia and Africa, promising 30% monthly returns and other promotional offers. It claimed that this was not a high-yield investment program (HYIP). Rather it was mentioned on the website that a group of people were "selflessly helping each other" in a form of "Global Fund of mutual aid." Participants were asked to send financial help to fellows with the promise that they would be helped when in need by returning a sum more than what they had sent. In India, for example, many victims of this scheme reported that once they sent the "help", they received messages saying that the system has restarted and they could no longer access their investments.

== See also ==
- Caritas (Ponzi scheme)
- Lyonya Golubkov
- Pyramid schemes in Albania
- The PyraMMMid
- Stock Generation, yet another financial scheme by Mavrodi, calling itself a "stock market game"
- European Kings Club
- QBF Investment Company – A Russian Ponzi scheme (2011–2021) that defrauded investors of 2+ billion rubles. Later Russian schemes like QBF Investment Company (2011–2021) evolved from MMM's mass-market approach to target wealthy investors through offshore Cyprus operations.
