= Relief defendant =

In the US, and possibly other common law countries, a "relief defendant" or "nominal defendant" is a person named in civil litigation who is not accused of wrongdoing. However, it is alleged that the relief defendant has received property originally obtained illegally and to which the relief defendant has no legitimate claim. It is not necessary that the relief defendant receive the property in question knowingly; however, a valid negotiated consideration creates a "legitimate claim".
