= List of Russian films of 2019 =

A list of films produced in Russia in 2019 (see 2019 in film).

== Film releases ==
Opening		Title	Russian title	Cast and crew	Details
J A N U A R Y	1	The Snow Queen: Mirrorlands	Снежная Королева: Зазеркалье	Director: Aleksey Tsitsilin, Robert Lence; Cast: Lina Ivanova, Vladimir Zaytsev, Olga Zubkova, Lyasan Utiasheva	Wizart Animation
J A N U A R Y	24	Sheep and Wolves: Pig Deal	Волки и Овцы: Ход свиньёй	Director: Vladimir Nikolaev; Cast: Elizaveta Boyarskaya, Maksim Matveyev, Galina Korneva, Anton Yuryev	Wizart Animation
J A N U A R Y	27	Saving Leningrad	Спасти Ленинград	Director: Aleksey Kozlov; Cast: Maria Melnikova, Andrey Udalov, Gela Meskhi, Anastasiya Melnikova, Valeriy Degtyar, Vitali Kishchenko, Aleksey Shevchenkov	Based upon real story of the barge 752 wreck at Lake Ladoga, the Siege of Leningrad in 1941, the Road of Life more people, that will evacuates the barge 752. At night, barge to the crash site, fascist war planes.
J A N U A R Y	31	Quiet Comes the Dawn	Рассвет	Director: Pavel Sidorov; Cast: Aleksandra Drozdova, Kuzma Kotrelev, Oksana Akinshina, Aleksandr Molochnikov	
F E B R U A R Y	7	The Factory	Завод	Director: Yuri Bykov; Cast: Denis Shvedov, Andrey Smolyakov, Ivan Yankovskiy	
F E B R U A R Y	7	How I Became Russian	Как я стал русским	Director: Akaki Sahelashvili, Xia Hao; Cast: Dun Chan, Elizaveta Kononova, Vitaliy Khaev, Hrant Tokhatyan	Russian-Chinese film
F E B R U A R Y	14	Breakaway	Отрыв	Director: Tigran Sahakyan; Cast: Irina Antonenko, Denis Kosyakov, Ingrid Olerinskaya, Mikhail Filippov, Andrey Nazimov	Official website (in English)
F E B R U A R Y	14	Loud Connection	Громкая связь	Director: Aleksey Nuzhnyy; Cast: Kamil Larin, Maria Mironova, Irina Gorbacheva	Russian remake of the 2016 Italian film Perfect Strangers
F E B R U A R Y	14	Pilgrim	Пилигрим	Director: Aleksandr Barshak; Cast: Igor Petrenko, Elena Sever, Aleksei Serebryakov, Vladimir Ilyin	
F E B R U A R Y	14	Seven Dinners	Семь ужинов	Director: Kirill Pletnyov; Cast: Polina Maksimova, Roman Kurtsyn	
F E B R U A R Y	21	The Conquest of Siberia	Тобол	Director: Igor Zaitsev; Cast: Ilya Malanin, Dmitri Dyuzhev, Yekaterina Guseva, Dmitry Nazarov, Pavel Tabakov	Film is based on the Russian conquest of Siberia. Official website at Yellow, Black and White (in English)
F E B R U A R Y	28	Mistresses	Любовницы	Director: Alyona Khazanova; Cast: Paulina Andreeva, Aleksandra Bortich, Yuliya Aleksandrova	
M A R C H	7	Guests	Гости	Director: Yevgeny Abyzov; Cast: Yuri Chursin, Angelina Strechina, Mikhail Meshcheryakov	Central Partnership
M A R C H	7	Harvie and the Magic Museum	Гурвинек. Волшебная игра	Director: Martin Kotík, Inna Evlannikova; Cast: Aleksandr Trachevskiy, Mikhail Yefremov, Konstantin Raykin	Czech-Russian production.
M A R C H	7	Van Goghs	Ван Гоги	Director: Sergey Livnev; Cast: Aleksei Serebryakov	
M A R C H	14	VMayakovsky	ВМаяковский	Director: Alexander Shein; Cast: Chulpan Khamatova	
M A R C H	14	Queen of Spades: Through the Looking Glass – Part 2	Пиковая дама: Зазеркалье	Director: Aleksandr Domogarov Jr. Cast: Angelina Strechina, Daniil Izotov, Claudia Boczar, Vladislav Konoplyov, Valeriy Pankov, Vladimir Kanuhin	Walt Disney Studios Sony Pictures Releasing (WDSSPR); The sequel to the 2015 film Queen of Spades: The Dark Rite.
M A R C H	21	The Balkan Line	Балканский рубеж	Director: Andrey Volgin; Cast: Anton Pampushnyy, Milos Bikovic, Gosha Kutsenko, Milena Radulovic, Gojko Mitić, Ravshana Kurkova, Dmitriy Frid	20th Century Fox CIS
M A R C H	21	Sober Driver	Трезвый водитель	Director: Rezo Gigineishvili; Cast: Viktor Khorinyak, Andrey Burkovsky, Yanina Studilina	

Opening		Title	Russian title	Cast and crew	Details
A P R I L	1	Happiness Is... Part 2	Счастье — это… Часть 2	Various directors. Cast: Irina Alfyorova, Yelena Valyushkina, Mariya Shalayeva, Aglaya Tarasova, Leonid Yakubovich, Stanislav Duzhnikov, Lyudmila Chursina, Ksenia Alfyorova, Darya Moroz	Anthology film, a sequel to Happiness is... (2015).
A P R I L	4	Why Don't You Just Die!	Папа, сдохни	Director: Kirill Sokolov; Cast: Aleksandr Kuznetsov, Vitaly Khaev, Evgeniya Kregzhde, Yelena Shevchenko, Mikhail Gorevoy	
A P R I L	11	Domovoy (The House Elf)	Домовой	Director: Yevgeny Bedarev; Cast: Sergey Chirkov, Yekaterina Guseva, Aleksandra Politik, Olga Ostroumova-Gutshmidt, Pavel Derevyanko, Yulia Sules, Tatyana Orlova, Sergey Rubeko	Netflix; Official Trailer in English
A P R I L	18	Billion	Миллиард	Director: Roman Prygunov; Cast: Vladimir Mashkov, Fyodor Bavtrikov, Aleksandra Bortich	
M A Y	8	Convoy 48		Director: Fyodor Popov; Cast: Artem Alekseev, Anastasiya Tsibizova, Igor Yasulovich, Artyom Melnichuk, Aleksandr Yatsenko, Darya Ekamasova	Official Trailer on Vimeo
M A Y	9	Anna's War	Война Анны	Director: Aleksey Fedorchenko; Cast: Marta Kozlova, Lyubov Vorozhtsova, Vladimir Sapin	
M A Y	10	Leaving Afghanistan	Братство	Director: Pavel Lungin; Cast: Kirill Pirogov, Yan Tsapnik, Anton Momot, Aleksandr Kuznetsov	Soviet troops from Afghanistan at the final stage of the Soviet-Afghan war.
J U N E	12	Donbass. Borderland	Донбасс. Окраина	Director: Renat Davletyarov; Cast: Gela Meskhi, Yevgeny Mikheev, Sergey Kholmogorov	
J U N E	20	Beanpole	Дылда	Director: Kantemir Balagov; Cast: Viktoria Miroshnichenko, Vasilisa Perelygina	

Opening		Title	Russian title	Cast and crew	Details
A U G U S T	22	Abigail	Эбигейл	Director: Aleksandr Boguslavskiy; Cast: Tinatin Dalakishvili, Gleb Bochkov, Rinal Mukhametov, Artyom Tkachenko	Official website (in English)
A U G U S T	22	The Bull	Бык	Director: Boris Akopov. Cast: Yura Borisov, Stasya Miloslavskaya, Afina Lukidi	
A U G U S T	22	Difficulties of Survival	Трудности выживания	Director: Yevgeniy Torres; Cast: Elizaveta Kononova, Vasiliy Brichenko	
A U G U S T	29	The Battle	Битва	Director: Anar Abbasov; Cast: Rinal Mukhametov, Anna Isaeva, Ekaterina Kukuy, Igor Mirkurbanov	Walt Disney Studios Sony Pictures Releasing (WDSSPR); The film is about a talented dancer, Anton, who as a result of a fight lost his hearing. He begins to teach deaf children to dance.
A U G U S T	29	Dream Team	Команда мечты	Director: Filipp Abryutin, Maksim Zykov; Cast: Makar Abryutin, Yan Tsapnik, Tagir Metshin, Kseniya Zolotova	
S E P T E M B E R	5	Odessa	Одесса	Director: Valery Todorovsky; Cast: Irina Rozanova, Yevgeny Tsyganov, Leonid Yarmolnik	Walt Disney Studios Sony Pictures Releasing (WDSSPR)
S E P T E M B E R	12	Dear Dad	Дорогой папа	Director: Mikhail Raskhodnikov; Cast: Vladimir Vdovichenkov, Valentina Lyapina	
S E P T E M B E R	19	Elephant	Элефант	Director: Aleksey Krasovskiy; Cast: Aleksei Guskov, Polina Agureeva	
S E P T E M B E R	19	Once in Trubchevsk	Однажды в Трубчевске	Director: Larisa Sadilova; Cast: Kristii Schneider, Egor Barinov	
S E P T E M B E R	26	Hero	Герой	Director: Karen Oganesyan; Cast: Alexander Petrov, Svetlana Khodchenkova, Vladimir Mashkov	

Opening		Title	Russian title	Cast and crew	Details
O C T O B E R	3	Love Them All	Люби их всех	Director: Mariya Agranovich; Cast: Alyona Mikhaylova, Aleksandr Kuznetsov, Sergei Garmash	Official website
O C T O B E R	3	The Wizard	Волшебник	Director: Mikhail Morskov; Cast: Semyon Treskunov, Maksim Sukhanov	In the past, a popular rock musician, suddenly he meets and dreams of learning to play the guitar.
O C T O B E R	10	Pain Threshold	Болевой порог	Director: Andrey Simonov; Cast: Natalya Skomorokhova, Roman Kurtsyn, Arina Postnikova	
O C T O B E R	24	Fantastic Return to Oz	Урфин Джюс возвращается	Director: Fyodor Dmitriev; Cast: Ekaterina Gorokhovskaya, Aleksandr Bykovskiy	Melnitsa Animation Studio
O C T O B E R	24	Guard	Сторож	Director: Yuri Bykov; Cast: Yuri Bykov, Vladislav Abashin, Alla Yuganova	
O C T O B E R	24	Text	Текст	Director: Klim Shipenko; Cast: Alexander Petrov, Ivan Yankovsky, Kristina Asmus, Maksim Vinogradov, Sofya Ozerova	Viewers over 18 years old
O C T O B E R	24	Wild League	Дикая Лига	Director: Andrey Bogatyrev, Art Camacho; Cast: Vladimir Yaglych	
O C T O B E R	31	A Frenchman	Француз	Director: Andrei Smirnov; Cast: Anton Rival, Evgenia Obraztsova, Yevgeny Tkachuk	
O C T O B E R	31	Fidelity	Верность	Director: Nigina Sayfullaeva; Cast: Yevgenia Gromova, Aleksandr Pal, Marina Vasileva	Midwife Lena, a loving wife, is driven towards a string of infidelities after her husband continues to neglect her.
O C T O B E R	31	Robo	Робо	Director: Sarik Andreasyan; Cast: Daniil Muravyev-Izotov, Sergey Bezrukov	Amazing friendship between a boy and a robot that help each other become better.
N O V E M B E R	21	The Blackout	Аванпост	Director: Egor Baranov; Cast: Pyotr Fyodorov, Aleksey Chadov, Konstantin Lavronenko, Svetlana Ivanova, Kseniya Kutepova, Filipp Avdeyev	
N O V E M B E R	21	Another Woman	Давай разведёмся	Director: Anna Parmas; Cast: Anna Mikhalkova, Anton Filipenko, Anna Rytsareva, Svetlana Kamynina	Official website
N O V E M B E R	28	Lev Yashin. The Goalee of My Dreams	Лев Яшин. Вратарь моей мечты	Director: Vasiliy Chiginskiy; Cast: Aleksandr Fokin, Yulia Khlynina, Aleksei Guskov, Aleksei Kravchenko, Evgeniy Dyatlov	
N O V E M B E R	28	Stray	Тварь	Director: Olga Gorodetskaya; Cast: Elena Lyadova, Anna Ukolova, Vladimir Vdovichenkov	
D E C E M B E R	5	1942: Unknown Battle; Rzhev (Battles of Rzhev)	Ржев	Director: Igor Kopylov; Cast: Sergey Zharkov, Ivan Batarev, Oleg Gayanov, Arseniy Semenov, Aleksandr Gorbatov, Aleksandr Bukharov, Grigoriy Nekrasov, Igor Grabuzov, Aleksandr Aravushkin	Based on the novel of a Soviet writer Vyacheslav Kondratyev, dedicated to Battles of Rzhev during the Great Patriotic War. After the fighting near the village of Ovsyannikovo, only a third of the company of Soviet soldiers remained. Winter War in February 1942.
D E C E M B E R	26	Fixies Vs. Crabots	Фиксики против кработов	Director: Oleg Uzhinov, Vasiko Bedoshvili; Cast: Dmitry Nazarov, Nonna Grishayeva, Larisa Brohman	
D E C E M B E R	26	Ivan Tsarevich and the Gray Wolf 4	Иван Царевич и Серый волк 4	Director: Darina Shmidt, Konstantin Feoktistov; Cast: Nikita Yefremov, Tatyana Bunina	
D E C E M B E R	26	Serf; Son of a Rich	Холоп	Director: Klim Shipenko; Cast: Miloš Biković, Aleksandra Bortich, Aleksandr Samoylenko, Ivan Okhlobystin, Maria Mironova, Oleg Komarov, Olga Dibtseva, Kirill Nagiyev	Central Partnership
D E C E M B E R	26	Union of Salvation	Союз спасения	Director: Andrei Kravchuk; Cast: Leonid Bichevin, Maksim Matveyev, Pavel Priluchny, Ivan Yankovsky, Anton Shagin, Ivan Kolesnikov, Igor Petrenko, Aleksei Guskov	Based on the historical narrative of the Union of Salvation and the Decembrist revolt of 1825 in the capital of the Russian Empire.

=== Culturally Russian films ===
- Anna is a 2019 French action thriller film directed by Luc Besson and starring Sasha Luss.
- The Prisoner of Sakura (Japanese: ソローキンの見た桜, Russian: В плену у сакуры) is a 2019 Japanese drama film directed by Masaki Inoue.
- Proxima is a 2019 French drama film directed by Alice Winocour.
- The Russian Bride is a 2019 American thriller horror film directed by Michael S. Ojeda and starring Kristina Pimenova.
- See You Soon is a 2019 American romance film directed by David Mahmoudieh.
- Sin is a 2019 Italian biographical drama film directed by Andrei Konchalovsky.

== See also ==
- 2019 in film
- 2019 in Russia
