= Kirill Polukhin =

Russian actor

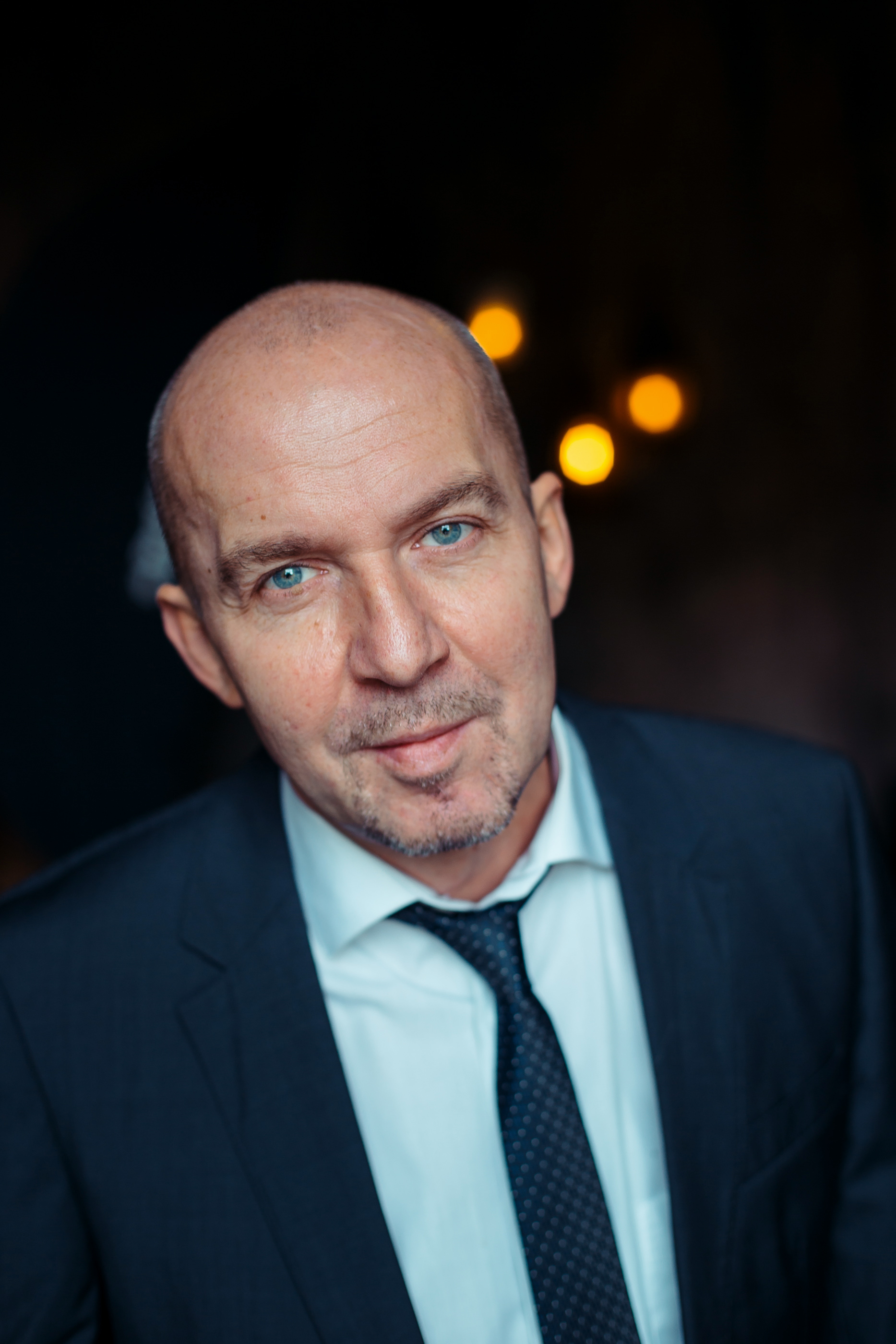
- Born: Kirill Alekseevich Palukhin; 3 May 1969 (age 57); Leningrad, RSFSR, USSR
- Citizenship: Soviet Union; Russia
- Education: Russian State Institute of Performing Arts
- Occupation: Actor
- Years active: 1989–present

Kirill Alekseevich Palukhin (Russian: Кирилл Алексеевич Полухин; born 3 May 1969) is a Soviet and Russian film, stage, and television actor.

== Early life ==
Palukhin was born in Leningrad, Russian SFSR, Soviet Union (now Saint Petersburg, Russia).

Palukhin was the only family member who had any relation to the arts: his father was a doctor and his mother was an economist. Polukhin worked in an acting studio owned by Zinovy Korogodsky.

== Career ==
In 1999, he graduated from the Russian State Institute of Performing Arts (course of Andrei Tolubeyev). In the same year, he joined the troupe of Tovstonogov Bolshoi Drama Theater.

Due to his appearance, Palukhin is mainly cast in antagonist roles.

== Personal life ==
Kirill Palukhin is married to an actress Svetlana Strogova and has a son, Innokenty (born in 1998).

== Selected filmography ==
- Secrets of Investigation (2002) as investigator of prosecutor's office
- Streets of Broken Lights (2005) as Samsonov
- The Fall of the Empire (2005) as soldat
- The Priest (2009) as partisan
- The Life and Adventures of Mishka Yaponchik (2010) as Grigory Kotovsky
- The Alien Girl (2010) as Kid
- Home (2011) as Senior
- Alien District (2011) as Igor Svistunov
- The Major (2013) as Kolya Burlakov
- The Fool (2014) as Matyugin
- Leningrad 46 (2014) as Stepan Zavyalov
- The Method (2014) as Sedoy, a detective
- Battalion (2015) as Zobov
- Ivan (2016) as Ivan
- Raid (2017) as episode
- The Age of Pioneers (2017) as part commander
- Gogol. Viy (2018) as Basavryuk
- The Factory (2018) as Andreich
- Better than Us (2018) as Pavel Varlamov
- Dead Lake (2019) as Smertin
- The Balkan Line (2019) as Barmin
- The Method (2020) as detective
- Streltsov (2020) as an officer in prison
- A Fairy Tale for the Old (2022) as shooter
