= Denis Shvedov =

Russian actor

- Денис Шведов
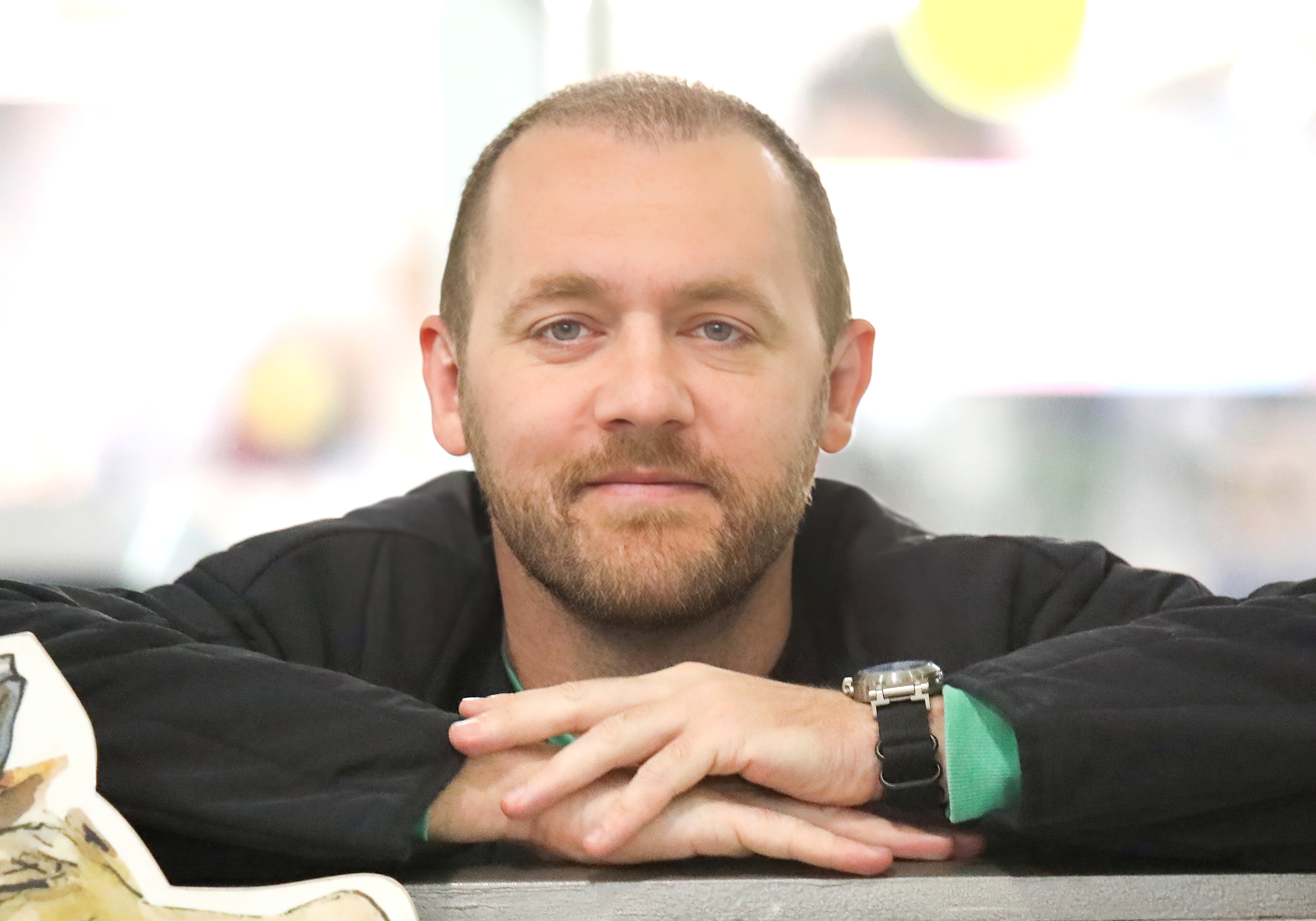
- Born: Denis Edouardovich Shvedov; 24 November 1981 (age 44); Moscow, RSFSR, USSR
- Occupation: Actor
- Years active: 2006–present
- Spouse: Aleksandra Rozovskaya
- Children: 2

Denis Edouardovich Shvedov (Russian: Дени́с Эдуа́рдович Шве́дов; born 24 November 1981) is a Russian actor, best known for his role in The Major.

== Biography ==
Denis Shvedov was born in Moscow, Russian SFSR, Soviet Union. After school he entered a tourism institute. However, he studied there without enthusiasm. Later his friend described his studies at a higher theatre school which inspired Denis to try this himself.

In 2006 Denis Shvedov graduated from the Mikhail Shchepkin Higher Theatre School, the course of N. Afonin. Then he was accepted into the troupe of the Russian Academic Youth Theater.

== Career ==
He started to act in film in the year 2006. He began to get episodic and background roles. The first major role he played was in the film A Good Friend for All (2008) - a New Year's romantic comedy.

Further, there was a successful role in the film To Live. He played the role of Andrey, who is trying to escape from his pursuers. The psychological drama won the Grand Prix of the festival of Russian cinema in Sweden "Cinema Rurik", Denis Shvedov and Vladislav Toldykov received prizes for the best male role.

Wide popularity came to him in 2013 after the role of police major in the film The Major (2013) by Yuri Bykov. For this picture, he received an award for the main male role of the XI International Festival "Pacific Meridian".

More success followed Denis Shvedov when he starred in the action drama series Silver Spoon (2014). The plot of the television show is built around the tragedy of Igor - the son of a high-ranking man, a typical burner of life portrayed by Pavel Priluchny - a boy born with the silver spoon. His character is Danila Korolev, who starts a confrontation with the main character. In 2016, the second season of Silver Spoon aired on television.

== Personal life ==
In 2016, Denis Shvedov and his unofficial wife Aleksandra Rozovskaya had a daughter.

== Selected filmography ==
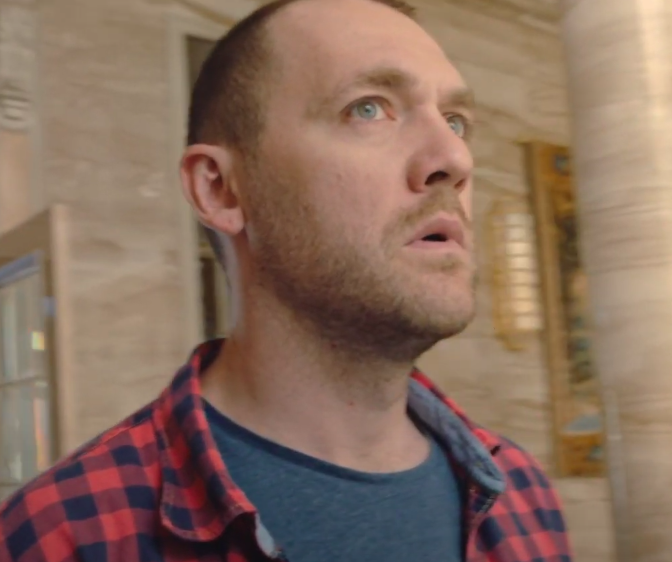
Shvedov in 2019

Year	Title	Role	Notes
2008	A Good Friend for All	Sasha Snegirev	
2008	Alexander	Sbyslav Yanukovich	
2010	To Live	Andrey	
2013	The Major	Major Sergei Sobolev	
2014	The Adventurers	Andrey	
2014-2016	Silver Spoon	Danila Korolev, senior lieutenant	TV series
2015	The Method	Igor Boyko, the skinhead	TV series
2017	Life Ahead	Igor	
2017	Raid	Pavel	TV series
2017	Dance to Death	Gray	
2018	The Factory		
2020	Phantom	Stas Khabarov, detective	TV series
2020	Wolf	Alexander Vasilievich Volk, intelligence officer	TV series
