= About a Wife, a Dream and Another... =

2013 film by Aleksandr Pozhenskiy

- Cinematic release poster
- Directed by: Aleksandr Pozhenskiy
- Written by: Aleksandr Pozhenskiy
- Produced by: Aleksandr Pozhenskiy; Sam Nalyu
- Starring: Aleksandra Kulikova; Konstantin Yushkevich; Olga Lomonosova; Aleksandr Pozhenskiy
- Cinematography: Sergey Zubikov
- Music by: Mark Fradkin
- Production company: 21kin.com
- Release date: October 16, 2013
- Running time: 84 minutes
- Country: Russia
- Language: Russian
- Box office: $13,970

About a Wife, a Dream and Another... is a 2013 Russian language film written and directed by Aleksandr Pozhenskiy. The film is an ironic dramedy in two parts.

== Plot ==
Maria and Vasin are not aware that in the parallel world they have another life, a wonderful life, where all their dreams have came true.

Part one, "A Pilot". 20 years ago, Maria refused to marry Air Force Lieutenant Vasin. Today they are lovers, but that's not enough. Vasin is an airline pilot, yet he regrets that he missed an opportunity to become a film director 20 years ago.

The second part, "A Film Director", reveals the alternative reality where Maria and Vasin are married, and Vasin is a film director. The plot questions whether Maria and Vasin are happy with this version of life, despite their dreams having come true.

== Cast ==
- Konstantin Yushkevich as Vasin
- Alexandra Kulikova as Maria
- Olga Lomonosova as Maria
- Aleksandr Pozhenskiy as Anton

== Production ==
Principal photography took one month including 18 days of filming in Moscow, and was completed on May 9, 2013. The first screening took place at the RIA Novosti press-center on October 12, 2013.

The main musical theme of the film is the music for the song "Up There, Beyond the Clouds" by Mark Fradkin.

== Reception ==
The film has been selected to a number of film festivals. It opened the 4th Drugoe Kino film festival in Moscow on October 16, 2013. On November 7, 2013, the film was shown at the 10th International Charitable Film Festival, Luch Angela in Moscow. The film was selected to be shown at the 22nd St. Petersburg International Film Festival, Festival Festivaley, which was held on June 23–29, 2014. The film was also included in the competitive program of the Arthouse Film Festival— Kinolikbez-V, which took place in Barnaul from May 14 to 17, 2014.

The film was accepted at the 14th International TV and Movies Forum competition, Vmeste, held on August 22–28, 2014, in Yalta. It was also chosen to be included in the program for the 6th Strana National Award Ceremony, which took place from March 17–19, 2015, during the Moscow Teleshow content market.

== Distribution ==
=== Cinematic release ===
The official premiere took place in a "35mm" cinema theater in Moscow on October 16, 2013. The premiere in St. Petersburg was on October 31, 2013. The film was available in theaters in eighteen Russian cities in the Cinema Park cinema theaters network and in 35mm, Khudozhestvenniy, Rodina, Dom Kino, and Slava cinema theaters until November 28, 2013. In the 45th week of 2013, the film was number two on the Russian box office chart in the limited release category.

The film's age rating in Russia is 12+.

=== Television ===
The television premiere was on August 16, 2014, on the NTV Plus channel program Our New Films. Since October 18, 2014, it was broadcast on TV1000 Russkoe Kino. Since October 26, 2014, it appeared on Tricolor TV channel Nashe HD, and since February 7, 2015, it has been shown on the Mir channel.

=== Online ===
The film was reported to be the first video on demand feature film available in 4K resolution in Russia.

An updated director's cut, featuring new footage, editing, colorgrading, sound and music editing, was released by RWV Films on December 5, 2019. The film's running time has been increased from 72 to 84 minutes.
