= Why Don't You Just Die! =

- Directed by: Kirill Sokolov
- Written by: Kirill Sokolov
- Produced by: Sofiko Kiknavelidze; Elena Geladze
- Starring: Aleksandr Kuznetsov; Vitaly Khaev; Evgeniya Kregzhde; Yelena Shevchenko
- Cinematography: Dmitry Ulyukaev
- Edited by: Kirill Sokolov
- Music by: Vadim Karpenko; Sergey Solovyov
- Production company: White Mirror Film Company
- Distributed by: Arrow Films
- Release dates: August 13, 2018 (Window to Europe Film Festival); April 4, 2019 (Russia)
- Running time: 100 minutes
- Country: Russia
- Language: Russian
- Budget: ₽50 million
- Box office: ₽2 million

Why Don't You Just Die (Russian: Папа, сдохни) is a 2018 Russian dark comedy action thriller film directed by Kirill Sokolov and starring Aleksandr Kuznetsov, Vitaly Khaev, Evgeniya Kregzhde and Yelena Shevchenko. The release took place in Russia on April 4, 2019.

== Plot ==
Olga, the daughter of a police officer named Andrei Gennadievich, persuades her boyfriend, Matvei, to murder her father, claiming that Andrei abused her as a child. Armed with a hammer, Matvei enters Andrei’s apartment, only to be caught and overpowered by Andrei, who ties him up and begins a brutal interrogation, suspecting he was sent by someone. When Matvei reveals his motives, Andrei is shaken, leading to a violent clash that uncovers a stash of money hidden in the family sofa. Matvei manages to escape briefly, but a police colleague, Evgenich, arrives and a deadly confrontation ensues, bringing long-held secrets of corruption, betrayal, and revenge to light.

Flashing back, the film reveals Andrei and Evgenich’s dark dealings, including taking bribes and covering up crimes. In the present, Olga admits that her abuse claim was a lie to get her hands on her father’s hidden fortune. As betrayals mount, Olga stabs Matvei, Andrei shoots his friend, and the chaos ultimately turns deadly for the entire family. In the end, a severely injured but miraculously alive Matvei stumbles out of the blood-stained apartment, leaving behind the very money that sparked the carnage.

== Cast ==
- Aleksandr Kuznetsov as Matvei
- Vitaly Khaev as Andrey Gennadievitch
- Evgeniya Kregzhde as Olga "Olya" Lekhovskaya
- Yelena Shevchenko as Natalia "Tasha", Olya's mother
- Mikhail Gorevoy as Yevgenich
- Igor Grabuzov as Oleg
- Aleksandr Domogarov Jr. as a maniac

== Release ==
The premiere screening of the film took place on August 13, 2018 as part of the XXVI national festival "Window to Europe", where it took first place in the voting of film critics and won the main prize of the festival in the feature film competition.

Why Don't You Just Die! is scheduled to be theatrically released in the Russian Federation in 2019.

== Reception ==
On review aggregation website Rotten Tomatoes, the film has an approval rating of 97% based on 72 reviews, and an average rating of 7.4/10. The website's critical consensus reads, "As wickedly smart as it is energetic, Why Don't You Just Die! should satisfy audiences in the mood for a gore-soaked good time." It also has a score of 69 out of 100 on Metacritic, based on 11 critics, indicating "generally favorable reviews".

Ed Potton of The Times rated the film 4 stars out of 5. Nikki Baughan of Empire rated the film 4 stars out of 5. William Hughes of The A.V. Club rated the film "B". Wendy Ide of The Observer rated the film 4 stars out of 5. Peter Bradshaw of The Guardian rated the film 4 stars out of 5.

The film received positive reviews in the Los Angeles Times, The New York Times, NPR, Variety, and The Hollywood Reporter.

Simon Abrams of RogerEbert.com gave the film a more mixed review, rating it 2.5 stars out of 4.
