= The Major (film) =

2013 film

- Film poster
- Directed by: Yuri Bykov
- Written by: Yuri Bykov
- Produced by: Alexei Uchitel
- Starring: Denis Shvedov; Yuri Bykov
- Cinematography: Kirill Klepalov
- Distributed by: Rock Studios; Bazelevs
- Release dates: May 2013 (Cannes); 8 August 2013 (Russia)
- Running time: 99 minutes
- Country: Russia
- Language: Russian

The Major (Russian: Майор, translit. Mayor) is a 2013 Russian crime drama film written and directed by Yuri Bykov, who also stars. It was first screened in the International Critics' Week at the 2013 Cannes Film Festival, and was screened in the Contemporary World Cinema section at the 2013 Toronto International Film Festival.

The film tells of Russian police staff who fall into difficult life situations, and their use of official positions and procedures to escape.

A television miniseries adaptation, Seven Seconds, was released in February 2018 on Netflix.

== Plot ==
Police Major Sergei Sobolev's wife is in labour. While rushing to the hospital his car hits and kills a boy on a pedestrian crossing. The boy's mother, Irina Gutorova, is the only witness.

The Major calls his colleagues to the scene. Pavel Korshunov eliminates evidence showing Sobolev's guilt, and the Chief of District Police forces the mother to give false testimony in favour of Major Sobolev.

Sobolev subsequently decides to confess and accept his punishment. The other police officers are opposed because, having covered for the major, they are complicit in the corruption in this modernized yet still corrupt police force.

== Cast ==
- Denis Shvedov as Major Sergei Sobolev
- Yuri Bykov as Pavel Korshunov, Sobolev's partner
- Ilya Isayev as Tolya Merkulov
- Dmitriy Kulichkov as Gutorov
- Boris Nevzorov as Alexey Pankratov, Chief of Police
- Irina Nizina as Irina Gutorova
- Kirill Polukhin as Kolya Burlakov

== Television adaptation ==
A ten-episode television miniseries adaptation of The Major, Seven Seconds, created and showrun by Veena Sud and written and directed by a returning Yuri Bykov, was released in-full on February 23, 2018, on Netflix.
