= Yuri Bykov =

Russian composer

- Юрий Быков
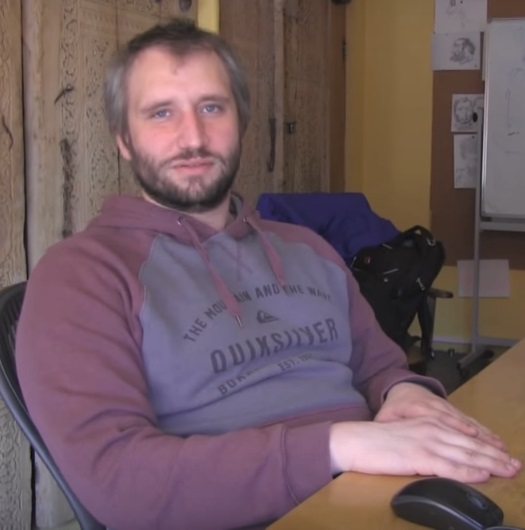
- Bykov in 2015
- Born: Yuri Anatolyevich Bykov; 15 August 1981 (age 45); Novomichurinsk, Ryazan Oblast, Soviet Union
- Education: Gerasimov Institute of Cinematography
- Occupations: Film director, film producer, screenwriter
- Years active: 2009 – present
- Awards: Nika Award (2014, 2015)

Yuri Anatolyevich Bykov (Russian: Ю́рий Анато́льевич Бы́ков; born August 15, 1981) is a Russian filmmaker, screenwriter and actor. He is best known for directing the films The Major, The Fool and the TV series The Method.

== Life and career ==
=== Early years ===
Yuri Bykov was born on August 15, 1981, in Novomichurinsk, Ryazan Oblast. First he lived with his parents in a trailer. Bykov's father was a chauffeur by profession, his mother worked at the Novomichurinsky plant of large-panel housing construction. Around 1987 his father left for Tyumen and he did not see him again. Approximately for 12 years, Bykov lived only with his mother. Later, his mother remarried, the stepfather was employed as a crane operator at a power plant. Bykov grew up in poverty. His mother would force him to steal food from the neighbors lot.

He was fond of literature, wrote stories and poems in a local newspaper, went to music school, played in music groups, worked as an arranger in a local studio. He was a good student at school, but from the ninth grade his grades dropped due to the loss of interest in studies and focus on creativity.

After graduating from school, Yuri Bykov worked as a loader for two weeks, then the next two to three years as a discothèque manager and as a stage machinist in the club of culture, and also attended a local drama group in parallel. Then he tried to pass exams for the acting department in various educational institutions, but did not go through the competition. Later, Boris Nevzorov visited Novomichurinsk and watched local performances, he was impressed by Bykov's performance and which made it possible for him to enroll in Nevzorov's course at GITIS. Six months later he moved from GITIS to VGIK, where there was a free seat, and studied at VGIK for four years.

In 2005 Yuri graduated from the acting department of VGIK (workshop of Vladimir Grammatikov). After VGIK he played in theaters: the Moscow Art Theater, Et Cetera, the Theater of the Moon, the Russian Army Theatre. In the latter he played the main role in the play "The Marriage of Belugin", but left during the rehearsal due to low salary and loss of interest. He played small roles in films and television series. For six years he was a clown animator in the Armenian children's club "Yauza", where he played the role of Jack Sparrow.

From 2005 to 2009 he made commercials and tried to shoot short films, but ended up not being satisfied with them. In 2006 he shot a six-minute film "Happiness", in 2007 a five-minute film "Stroka" and in 2008 a fourteen-minute film "Evening".

=== Film career ===
In 2009, he directed a short film "The Chief", in which he appeared as a screenwriter, director, composer, producer and actor. The film was awarded the prize for best short film at the Kinotavr Film Festival. The film was shot using 150 thousand rubles, which Bykov previously planned to invest in his training at the directing faculty of the VGIK from Vadim Abdrashitov, where he was accepted twice.

In 2010 Yuri Bykov made his feature film debut with the film To Live.

He was the director of the series "Stanitsa", but left directly from the set due to creative differences. Due to a judicial ruling, Bykov had to pay 2 152 500 rubles for his departure to the company Kinotelefilm.

In 2013, his film The Major premiered in the Critics' Week at the Cannes Film Festival. The crime drama was awarded at several festivals, including prizes for Best Picture, Best Director and For Outstanding Artistic Contribution at the 16th Shanghai International Film Festival. In 2016, the American company Netflix received distribution rights and plans to remake the film as a mini-series, titled Seven Seconds, which will include 10 episodes.

In 2014, the social drama film The Fool was released. The picture received a number of prestigious awards, including the Grigori Gorin prize for the best script and the diploma of the Russian Guild of Film Critics ("For the uncompromising artistic expression") at the Kinotavr-2014 festival. Also the film was highly rated by The New York Times critic Stephen Holden, who named it as one of the five best films of 2015.

In 2014 he became the director of the first season of the crime drama television series The Method, which was released on the screen next year. Konstantin Khabensky, who liked Bykov's work on the film "The Major", invited him to work as director on the series. Yuri Bykov notes that he shot the series "according to the principles of the comics" in its light form and followed the instructions of the showrunner Aleksandr Tsekalo about creating a "Russian HBO". The series received the TEFI award in the category "Television film / TV series" and several other awards. Bykov refused to participate in the shooting of the second season because he wanted to concentrate on making more auteur films.

He shot two-thirds of the film The Age of Pioneers, dedicated to Alexei Leonov and his spacewalk, but because of creative disagreements he was removed from the project. According to the producer of the film Timur Bekmambetov, the film has some scenes which were filmed by Yuri Bykov. Bykov noted in an interview that is not interested in seeing the movie because the story became drastically simplified and the film's tone became overly patriotic. Bykov pointed out that to the best of his knowledge the film was completely re-shot, with the possible exception of one scene that could not be repeated because of unrestorable scenery.

He founded the Koda film company in 2016 to significantly reduce the cost of administering his own auteur films and gaining more overall control over the filming process.

In 2016 he finished shooting the action series "Sleepers" based on the script by Sergey Minaev. Bykov notes that at the beginning of the project there were talks about the possibility of an auteur series, but then he became an ordinary hired director without the right to participate in post-production, including editing. When the series was shown on television, it received a strongly negative response from the audience.

In 2018 the drama The Factory was released. In the film a group of factory workers around the protagonist Sedoy who are left without work as the factory they were working in is closed down by the management due to lack of profit. The factory workers decide to wage a fierce struggle, kidnap their former boss and barricade themselves inside factory building. Ultimately, the group is killed by the company’s hired security forces and a special task force of the Russian police. Despite the negative outcome of the film, which ends with the utter failure of the struggle and the death of all participants, sociologist David Leupold sees in the work an example of "subversive pessimism":

"Unlike kitschy revolutionary romance, which in its essence is exactly the opposite — namely reactionary inertia — the film deprives the viewer of the longed-for catharsis. And it is precisely this thwarted catharsis, this unfulfilled phantasy of another world on the screen that throws us from cinematic phantasmagoria back into reality. It is hard reminder that there is no other world than our own world of injustice, brutality and imperfection ... Our fundamental and painful dissonance with the world as it is is already pointing to its inevitable change — though as a yet unfinished potential."

On 13 October 2017, Yuri announced that he has betrayed the progressive generation and that he will take an indefinite hiatus from directing, but will still finish his work on The Guard, which was released in 2019.

== Filmography ==
=== As director ===
- 2009 Начальник / The Boss (short)
- 2010 Жить / To Live (debut film)
- 2011 Инкассаторы / Collectors (TV series)
- 2013 Майор / The Major
- 2014 Дурак / The Fool
- 2014 Ёлки / Yolki 1914
- 2015 Метод / The Method (TV series)
- 2017 Спящие / Sleepers (TV series)
- 2018 Завод / The Factory
- 2018 Сторож / Guard

=== As actor ===
- 2006-2007 Love as Love (TV series) as episode
- 2006 All mixed up the house ... (TV series) as Gennadiy Demidov
- 2007 Soldiers 13
- 2007 Sea soul (TV series) as Vadik
- 2008 Ranetki (TV series) Tom drug dealer
- 2008 SSD as maniac in a mask
- 2009 The chief as captain FSB
- 2009 The keys to happiness (Mini-series) as Oleg
- 2009 Tanks are not afraid of dirt (Mini-series) as sergeant Vadim Smirnov
- 2009 Law and Order: Department of operative investigations 3 as Jora Semenov
- 2009 Two Sisters 2 (TV series) as bandit
- 2009 Always say "always" 5
- 2009 Chain
- 2009 Wild (TV series)
- 2010 Soldiers 16: Dembel inevitable (TV series) as Private Nikolay Soponar
- 2012 Collectors (TV series) as robber
- 2013 The Major as Pavel Korshunov
- 2015 The Method (TV series) as "Khudoy", the detective

== Awards ==
- The Fool:
  - Best Screenplay, Open Russian Film Festival Kinotavr, Sochi (Russia), 2014
  - Best Screenplay in Fiction Section, Tenemos Que Ver - International Film Festival on Human Rights of Uruguay, Montevideo, (Uruguay), 2014
- The Major:
  - First prize, Shanghai International Film Festival, Shanghai (China), 2013
  - Best music, Shanghai International Film Festival, Shanghai (China), 2013
  - Best directing, Shanghai International Film Festival, Shanghai (China), 2013
- To Live:
  - First feature film Prize, International Film Festival and Forum on Human Rights, Moscow (Russia), 2010
- The Boss:
  - Best Short Film, Open Russian Film Festival Kinotavr, Sochi (Russia), 2009
