= Find and Neutralize =

- Russian: Найти и обезвредить
- Directed by: Georgy Kuznetsov
- Written by: Gennadi Bokarev
- Starring: Boris Nevzorov; Andrey Gradov; Aleksandr Voevodin; Irina Shmeleva; Nina Ruslanova
- Cinematography: Gennadi Trubnikov
- Edited by: Raisa Stukova
- Music by: Vladimir Lebedev
- Production company: Sverdlovsk Film Studio
- Release date: May 16, 1983
- Running time: 87 min.
- Country: Soviet Union
- Language: Russian

Find and Neutralize (Russian: Найти и обезвредить, romanized: Nayti i obezvredit) is a 1983 Soviet action adventure film directed by Georgy Kuznetsov.

The film tells the story of a group of friends who go on vacation to the small Siberian town of Semirechensk. Suddenly, there was a murder and theft of a large sum of money, and the characters decide to help the militia find the criminals.

== Plot ==
Three friends—Viktor, Dmitry, and Fyodor—travel from Leningrad to a remote forest village for a vacation. On the flight, they meet Yulia, a skilled sports shooter and an old acquaintance of Dmitry. Arriving at Fyodor's hometown, the group stays at the house of Fyodor's brother and reconnects with local friends, including Fyodor's former guardian, Aunt Pasha, and her troublemaking nephew, Vasya. Their plans for a peaceful retreat are shattered when they learn that bandits have attacked a cash transport, killing Aunt Pasha, severely injuring the driver, and fleeing into the forest with a large sum of money. After a heated argument about how to respond, Fyodor and Dmitry set off into the woods to track down the criminals, followed later by Viktor.

The pursuit unfolds with action-packed scenes of shootouts, high-speed chases involving heavy vehicles and motorboats, and hostage situations. As each man faces the danger head-on, they struggle to bring the perpetrators to justice. Ultimately, the villains are subdued, and the heroes, though battered and wounded, emerge victorious, celebrating their hard-fought triumph over evil.

== Cast ==
- Boris Nevzorov as Fyodor
- Andrey Gradov as Viktor
- Aleksandr Voevodin as Dima
- Irina Shmeleva as Yulya
- Nina Ruslanova as Nyura
- Anatoliy Rudakov as Vasya
- Mikhail Zhigalov as Joker
- Nikolai Smirnov as Shaved
- Vladimir Shakalo as Sleepy
- Maria Vinogradova as aunt Pasha
