= Moscow Never Sleeps (film) =

2016 Russian-Irish film

- Theatrical film poster
- Directed by: Johnny O'Reilly
- Written by: Johnny O'Reilly
- Produced by: Katie Holly; Johnny O'Reilly
- Starring: Aleksei Serebryakov; Mikhail Yefremov; Evgeniya Brik; Lyubov Aksyonova; Yelena Safonova; Viktor Verzhbitsky; Alyona Babenko; Yuri Stoyanov; Anastasia Shalonko; Oleg Dolin; Sergei Belov; Tamara Spiricheva
- Cinematography: Fedor Lyass
- Edited by: Dermot Diskin; Nico Leunen
- Music by: Roman Litvinov
- Release dates: 11 November 2016 (Ireland); 10 March 2017 (Russia)
- Running time: 100 mins.
- Countries: Russia; Ireland
- Language: Russian

Moscow Never Sleeps is a 2017 Russian-Irish drama film, directed and written by Johnny O'Reilly. The ensemble cast stars Aleksei Serebryakov, Mikhail Yefremov, Evgeniya Brik, Lyubov Aksyonova, Yelena Safonova, Viktor Verzhbitsky, Alyona Babenko, Yuri Stoyanov, Anastasia Shalonko, Oleg Dolin, Sergei Belov, and Tamara Spiricheva. It premiered in both Russia and Ireland in 2017.

== Synopsis ==
The volatile intersections of contemporary Moscow and the intimate lives of five people.

== Cast ==
- Aleksei Serebryakov as Anton
- Mikhail Yefremov as Vladimir
- Evgeniya Brik as Katia
- Lyubov Aksyonova as Ksenia
- Yelena Safonova as Natasha
- Viktor Verzhbitsky as Gorbunov
- Alyona Babenko as Marina
- Yuri Stoyanov as Valeriy
- Anastasia Shalonko as Lera
- Oleg Dolin as Ilya
- Sergei Belov as Stepan
- Tamara Spiricheva as Vera
- Elena Starostina as Julia
- Dmitri Pavlenko as Ivan
- Akim Efremov as Dima
- Rustam Akhmadeyev as Arto
- Pavel Khrulyov as Slava
- Sofya Resnyanskaya as Masha
- Anna Gulyarenko as Lubov
- Mikhail Pavlik as Igor
- Marina Kondratyeva as Kamilla
- Grigoriy Baranov as Yuri
- Irina Chipizhenko as Sasha
- Anastasiya Imamova as Nina
- Maksim Derichev as Zhenya
- Svyatoslav Nastashevskiy as Trusov

== Reception ==
Metacritic, which uses a weighted average, assigned the film a score of 51 out of 100, based on 7 critics, indicating "mixed or average" reviews. On the review aggregator website Rotten Tomatoes, 71% of 21 critics' reviews are positive, with an average rating of 6.80/10.

Jessica Kiang of Variety compared the film to Magnolia (1999). Brogen Hayes of Movies.ie lauded the "strong performances from its actors", akin to Crash (2004). Noel Murray of the Los Angeles Times likened the film to Short Cuts (1993). Lisa Trifone of Third Coast Review applauded filmmaker Johnny O'Reilly. Marnie Schleicher of SF Weekly mused, "The picture resembles the recent 100 Streets (2016), though it could have used some of that film's unabashed soapiness."

Kristen Yoonsoo Kim of The Village Voice said it is "ambitious to a fault". Donald Clarke of The Irish Times echoed that sentiment. Hilary A. White of the Sunday Independent said the film "does an excellent job". Stephen Porzio of Film Ireland lauded that "as a love-letter to the nation's capital, the movie succeeds". André Hereford of Film Journal International praised the cinematography for its role in a "tense yet effective ode to an imperfect metropolis".

Ben Kenigsberg of The New York Times opined that the film is "dramatically resolutely familiar, even trite". Frank Scheck of The Hollywood Reporter chided the film, saying "the jumble of storylines inevitably results in narrative confusion". Anita Katz of the San Francisco Examiner derided the film for "delivering little emotional impact". Nathanael Hood of The Young Folks stated that the film "manages a brief profundity".

Paddy Kehoe of RTÉ proclaimed it "needs more than such rich poetic moments of camerawork". Alan Zilberman of The Washington Post dubbed it "uneven because of the inescapable nature of such interlocking narratives: some land better than others". And Tricia Olszewski of the Washington City Paper sardonically remarked "Moscow Never Sleeps, but viewers probably will."
