= Olga Lomonosova =

Russian actress and former ballerina

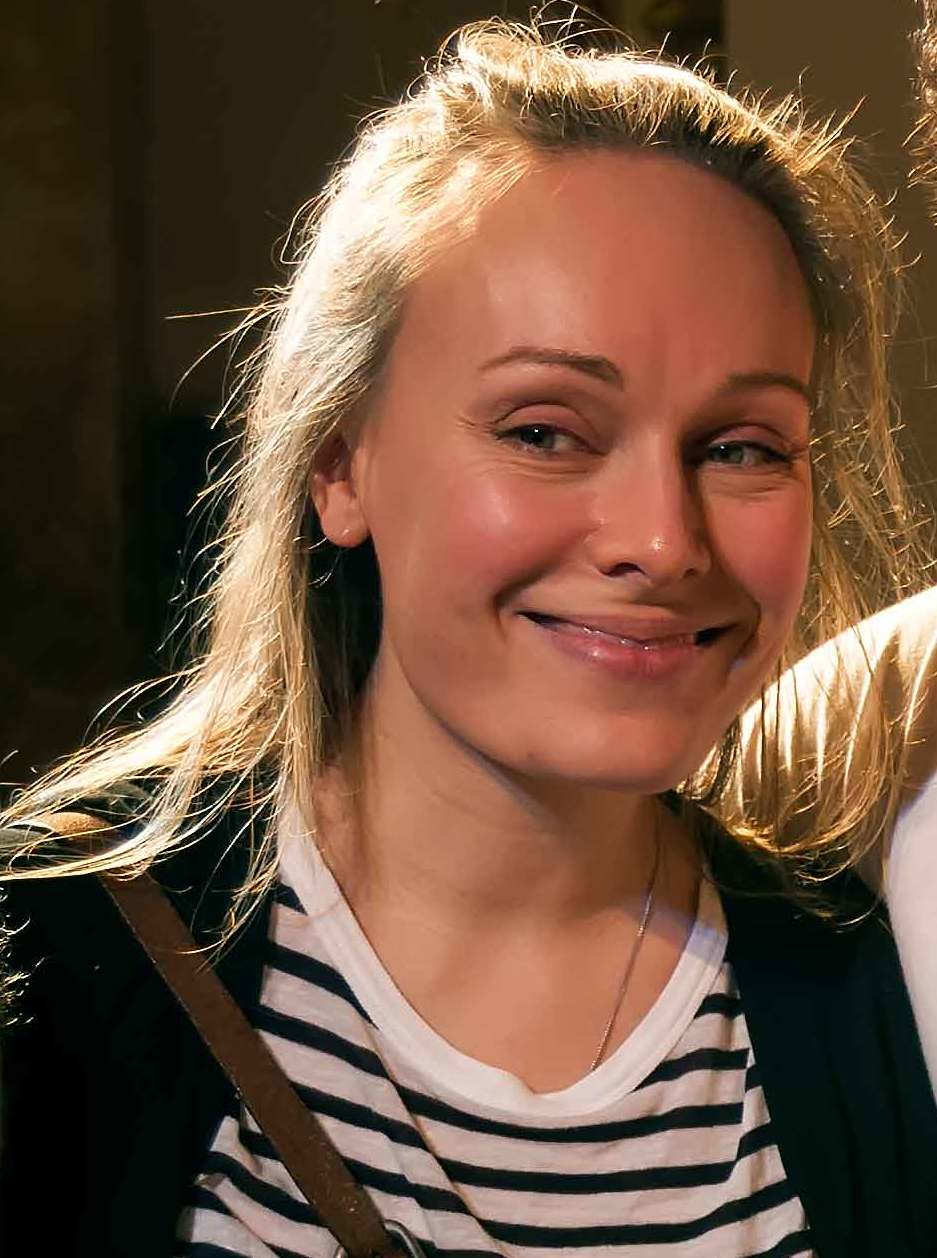
- Lomonosova at the play "Passion for the Queen of Spades" in 2018.
- Born: 18 May 1978 (age 47); Donetsk, Ukrainian USSR, USSR
- Citizenship: Ukraine → Russia
- Occupations: Former Ballet dancer, actress
- Years active: 2001–present

Olga Olegovna Lomonosova (Russian: Ольга Олеговна Ломоносова; born 18 May 1978) is a Russian actress and former ballerina. She is best known for her roles as Kira Voropayeva in the television series Not Born Beautiful and Alla Safranov in the Netflix series Better than Us.

== Early life ==
Olga Lomonosova was born in Donetsk, Soviet Union, to mother Natalia Evgenyevna Lomonosova, an economist, and her dad a builder. As a child, she participated in rhythmic gymnastics. In 1986, the Lomonosova family moved to Kiev, where Olga was admitted to the School of The Olympic Reserve of Albina Deriugina, achieving candidacy for master of sports. At the age of 12, Lomonosova entered the Kiev Choreographic School to study ballet.

In 1997, Lomonosova moved to Moscow and enrolled in the Stanislavski and Nemirovich-Danchenko Theatre as a ballet dancer. She studied under Rodion Ovchinnikov at the Boris Shchukin Theatre Institute, and successfully graduated in 2003.

== Roles in the theatre ==
"Beautiful People" (the prom performance; directed by Pavel Safonov)- Natalia Petrovna at the Boris Shchukin Theatre Institute.

2003 - Lear (based on King Lear by William Shakespeare; directed by Vladimir Mirzoyev) – Cordelia; Don Juan and Sganarel, Caligula, at the E. B. Vakhtangov Theatre.

A Midsummer Night's Dream - Hermia at the Moscow Drama Theatre named after K. S. Stanislavsky. Pygmalion (Entreprise Performance: Theatre Marathon Project) - Eliza Doolittle at the Theatre Agency "Premiere"

At other Theatres: "Duck Hunt" – Galina, 2014 - "Tartuf" - Elmira, Wife of Orgon, "Valentine's Day" – Valentina, 2015 - "Male fragrance. Orchestra" – Suzanne, 2018 -"The Eldest Son" by A. Vampilova - Nina, daughter of Sarafanov and 2018 -Platonov».

== TV and film ==
Lomonosova's first major role on television was as Ekaterina Vosnesenskaya in the 2003 television series Kobra. Antiterror. Her breakthrough role was playing Kira Voropayeva in the 2005 television series Not Born Beautiful.

In 2012, she played the lead role in the film Masha. In 2018, she appeared in the film Secrets and Lies.

In 2019, she played Alla Safranov, estranged wife of Georgy Safronov, in the Netflix original series Better than Us.

== Filmography ==
Year	Title	Role
2001	New Year's Adventures (TV series)	Episode
2003	Kobra. Antiterror (TV series)	Ekaterina Vosnesenskaya (2 episodes)
2004	Arbat's Children	Lyudmila
2005	Tairov's death	Agnes / Brombilla
2005	New Year's men	Alyona
2005	Don't be born beautiful	Kira Voropaeva
2005	Big evil and petty mischief	Dmitry Potapov, friend of Information Minister Dmitry Potapov
2005	One shadow for two	Martha
2006	Moya Prechistenka (English titles: My Prechistenka Street) (TV series)	Sofya Kuratova (1 episode)
2006	The Goddess of Prime Time	Alina Lavrova
2006	The Red Room	Ekaterina
2007	Nine months	Natalia
2007	Love on the edge of a knife	Larisa
2007	Night Sisters	Vera Brusnichkina, nurse in the sanatorium
2008	Return point	Shnireova
2008	Remote consequences	Tatiana Vinogradova, notary
2008	Twice in one river	Elena Bolotova
2008	Cheesecake	Natalia
2008	The novel of the weekend	Galina Kuptsova
2008	You're my dream...	Olga Nikolaevna
2008	Five steps on the clouds	Valeria Krylova, editor of Money and Power magazine
2009	I'm not me.	Victor's wife
2009	Hypericum	Maria Nazarova, doctor
2009	High aerobatics	Natalia Stebeltsova, Senior Flight Attendant
2009	Unforgiven	Katya
2009	Two stories about love	Olga
2009	The history of the pilot	Victoria
2009	Random recording	Irina
2009	Military intelligence	Kuznetsova
2010	Retired colonel's private slate	Maya
2010	An informed source in Moscow	Jennifer Louis
2010	Duty Angel	Eugenia Kostina
2010	Military intelligence. (film 3. "Eleventh Workshop")	Anna Kuznetsova, neurologist
2011	St. John's Worty-2	Maria
2011	Back - fortunately, or Who will find the Blue Bird	Maria
2012	Object 11	Margarita Troshina
2012	Babi Kingdom	Oksana Nikitina
2012	Angel on duty - 2	Eugenia Kostina
2013	Masha	Masha (main role)
2013	Three days with a jerk.	Lady in black
2013	There are no exes	Lera Korshunova
2013	45 seconds	Tatiana Chernigova (main role)
2013	Black Cats	Anna Antonovna, Secretary
2013	About a Wife, a Dream and Another...	Mariya
2014	Longest day	Zhenya
2014	Killer whale	Olga Kosatkina, Police Major, Analyst
2015	Godfather	Anna
2016	And the dawns are quiet here.	Mother Of the Quarter (episode)
2016	Citizen Nobody	Irina Kovaleva
2018	Secrets and lies	Katya
2019	Better than Us	Alla
