= Better Than Us =

Russian science fiction television series

- Russian-language poster
- Genre: Science fiction; Drama; Action
- Created by: Andrey Junkovsky; Aleksandr Dagan; Aleksandr Kessel
- Starring: Paulina Andreeva; Kirill Käro; Aleksandr Ustyugov; Olga Lomonosova; Eldar Kalimulin; Vita Kornienko; Aleksandr Kuznetsov; Vera Panfilova; Fedor Lavrov; Sergey Sosnovsky; Pavel Vorozhtsov; Irina Tarannik; Sergey Kolesnikov; Kirill Polukhin
- Country of origin: Russia
- Original language: Russian
- No. of seasons: 1
- No. of episodes: 16

Production
- Producers: Vitali Shlyappo; Eduard Iloyan; Aleksei Trotsyuk; Denis Jalinskiy; Mikhail Tkachenko; Eduard Gorbenko; Aleksander Kessel
- Production location: Moscow
- Cinematography: Ilya Ovsenev
- Running time: 50 minutes
- Production company: BYW Group

Original release
- Network: Start; C1R
- Release: 23 November 2018

Better Than Us (Russian: Лучше, чем люди, romanized: Luchshe, chem lyudi, literally "better than people") is a 2018 Russian science fiction television series created by Andrey Junkovsky, about an advanced empathic android named Arisa. It stars Paulina Andreeva and Kirill Käro, as well as Aleksandr Ustyugov. It was produced by Yellow, Black and White in cooperation with Sputnik Vostok Production for the Russian state channel C1R.

Netflix purchased it under the English title Better than Us, and it is the first Russian series presented as a Netflix original series. On 16 August 2019, the first season of sixteen episodes became available to stream in Netflix markets outside of Russia and China. A second season of ten episodes was planned to begin filming in Moscow and Beijing in the third quarter of 2021.

== Synopsis ==
The story takes place in 2029, in a world where androids serve humans in various positions, even replacing them in many menial jobs. An advanced robot named Arisa is imported to Russia from China discreetly, within the CRONOS corporation. Arisa accidentally kills a man who tries to use her as a sex robot, and then flees. Her ability to kill humans shows she does not abide by Asimov's Three Laws of Robotics. Instead, she is designed to protect her family (which includes herself) by all means possible. She encounters a little girl (Sonya) and automatically bonds with her, making herself the child's guardian.

The series follows three storylines:

1. that of Arisa and the family she adopts;
2. the family's son, Egor Safronov, and his girlfriend, Zhanna, as part of the anti-droid militant group called the "Liquidators";
3. the secrets of Viktor Toropov, the head of CRONOS, as he tries to hide the fact that they are unable to make another Arisa.

By the end, it is revealed that China's one-child policy has led to a critical shortage of marriageable women, so an engineer designed Arisa; she is programmed to be a wife to a man and mother to adopted children. However, her creator dies and Arisa is sold to the Russian robotics firm CRONOS.

== Cast and characters ==
- Paulina Andreeva as Arisa, prototype of a new generation of empathetic bots
- Kirill Käro as Georgy Safronov, pathologist, former surgeon, father to Egor and Sonya
- Aleksandr Ustyugov as Viktor Toropov, CRONOS director

=== Family ===
- Olga Lomonosova as Alla Safronova, Georgy's ex-wife
- Eldar Kalimulin as Egor Safronov, Georgy and Alla's son
- Vita Kornienko as Sonya Safronova, Georgy and Alla's daughter

=== CRONOS, Liquidators, and related ===
- Aleksandr Kuznetsov as Bars, bartender at Club Liquidators and Zhanna's brother
- Vera Panfilova as Zhanna Barseneva, waitress at Bot.Net and Bars' sister
- Fedor Lavrov as Gleb, a fixer on Toropov's payroll (CRONOS) and liaison to the Liquidators
- Sergey Sosnovsky as Alexey Stepanovich Losev, head of the State Duma Committee on Cyber Security and Svetlana's father
- Pavel Vorozhtsov as Igor Mikhailovich Maslovsky, head tech at CRONOS
- Irina Tarannik as Svetlana Toropova, Viktor's wife
- Mariya Lugovaya as Larisa 'Lara' Kuras, a hacker helping the Liquidators, who is involved with Bars

=== Police ===
- Sergey Kolesnikov as Anatoly Vladimirovich Svetov, head of the police department on fighting cybercrime
- Kirill Polukhin as Pavel Borisovich Varlamov, an investigator in the cybercrime department, a former employee of the homicide department
- Viktoriya Korlyakova as Irina Plescheeva, a subordinate to Varlamov in the cybercrime department

== Episodes ==
=== Season 1 (2018–19) ===
No. overall	No. in season	Title	Directed by	Written by	Original release date
1	1	"Episode 1"	Andrey Dzhunkovskiy	Alexander Kessel	23 November 2018
2	2	"Episode 2"	Andrey Dzhunkovskiy	Alexander Kessel	23 November 2018
3	3	"Episode 3"	Andrey Dzhunkovskiy	Alexander Kessel	30 November 2018
4	4	"Episode 4"	Andrey Dzhunkovskiy	Alexander Kessel	7 December 2018
5	5	"Episode 5"	Andrey Dzhunkovskiy	Alexander Kessel	14 December 2018
6	6	"Episode 6"	Andrey Dzhunkovskiy	Alexander Dagan	21 December 2018
7	7	"Episode 7"	Andrey Dzhunkovskiy	Alexander Kessel	28 December 2018
8	8	"Episode 8"	Andrey Dzhunkovskiy	Alexander Kessel	28 December 2018
9	9	"Episode 9"	Andrey Dzhunkovskiy	Alexander Kessel	11 January 2019
10	10	"Episode 10"	Andrey Dzhunkovskiy	Alexander Kessel	18 January 2019
11	11	"Episode 11"	Andrey Dzhunkovskiy	Alexander Kessel	25 January 2019
12	12	"Episode 12"	Andrey Dzhunkovskiy	Alexander Kessel	1 February 2019
13	13	"Episode 13"	Andrey Dzhunkovskiy	Alexander Kessel	8 February 2019
14	14	"Episode 14"	Andrey Dzhunkovskiy	Alexander Kessel	15 February 2019
15	15	"Episode 15"	Andrey Dzhunkovskiy	Alexander Kessel	22 February 2019
16	16	"Episode 16"	Andrey Dzhunkovskiy	Alexander Kessel	1 March 2019

== Production ==
The filming of the television series began in 2016 and ended in 2018.

== See also ==
- Real Humans, 2012 Swedish television series
- Almost Human, 2013 American television series
- Humans, 2015 British-American television series
