= Phantom (Russian TV series) =

Russian police drama TV series

- Russian: Фантом
- Genre: Thriller; crime fiction; drama
- Screenplay by: Anastasiya Volkova; Yuliya Baeva
- Directed by: Ilya Shekhovtsov
- Starring: Denis Shvedov; Evgeniya Brik; Angelina Zagrebina
- Country of origin: Russia
- Original language: Russian
- No. of seasons: 1
- No. of episodes: 8 (list of episodes)

Production
- Producers: Valery Fedorovich; Evgeny Nikishov; Denis Dubovik
- Cinematography: Ivan Chengich
- Running time: 45 mins. (per episode)
- Production company: 1-2-3 Production

Original release
- Network: TV-3
- Release: November 23, 2020

Phantom (Russian: Фантом, romanized: Fantom) is a Russian eight-part television crime series, which premiered on TV-3 on November 23, 2020. It also appeared on StudioCanal from April 2021. Phantom was broadcast from July 15, 2021 on Australian network, SBS-TV's streaming service, On Demand. Filming took place in Moscow from June to October 2019. The action is largely set in that city from late August to mid-September 2020. In the series, the main protagonist, Stas Khabarov (Denis Shvedov) is a police detective, trailing a drug dealer. Stas is murdered by a third person and becomes a phantom to protect his estranged wife, Vera (Evgeniya Brik) from his killer. Stas is assisted by teenage college student, Katya (Angelina Zagrebina), who can see and hear him.

== Plot ==
Stas hunts a major drug dealer, Gypsy, who distributes a synthetic drug, "Rad". The latest of five deaths in a month was a young woman, Lena. Stas corners Gypsy on a rooftop but is killed by a third person as he turns around. His phantom, heads towards a lit doorway but pauses when he has a vision of Vera being shot by his own murderer. Stas has two weeks to find the killer and protect Vera. Stas' boss, Victor leads the detective squad with other members, Artur, Dima and Ksyu. Vera works for the police in a different section. Her boss, Lyosha, has romantic designs on her. Stas enlists Katya, a first-year Psychology major, to help him. Katya lives with her Aunt Ira while trying to unearth details about her parents' deaths. At college Katya encounters Igor a spoilt, rich man; Dina another first-year student; and Anton, a fellow student and sometime musician.

Stas learns his squad has a mole and suspects each one, in turn. "Rad" distribution is taken over by Dunya. Stas asks Katya to risk her safety first by retrieving Gypsy's phone and later by getting Dunya's contacts list. Stas and Anton help Katya to find her mother, Olya. Vera initially suspects Stas had cheated on her; that he was bribed by drug dealers; and that he fathered a son with a prostitute. Later Vera finds her suspicions were false. Artur buys black market drugs: pain-killers for his ex-wife. Ksyu spied on fellow squad members for Internal Affairs. Dima is arrested after being linked to a human trafficking ring and threatening to kill Vera. Igor is questioned about knowing Lena and buying "Rad" from Gypsy. Next day he is found dead of an overdose. Lyosha stalked Stas and is friends with Igor's mother. Katya's involvement in the investigations results in her being questioned. Vera is threatened, at gun-point, on her birthday. Stas asks Katya to convince his remaining squad members to save Vera.

== Cast ==
- Denis Shvedov as Stanislav "Stas" Khabarov, Moscow police detective, uses unorthodox methods. His wife, Vera asked him to move out of their flat.
- Evgeniya Brik as Vera Khabarova, police officer, suspected Stas of cheating.
- Angelina Zagrebina as Ekaterina "Katya" Savelieva, 18-year-old woman, first-year Psychology major at a Moscow college, able to see and hear Stas. She is prescribed Amitriptyline for major depressive disorder due to her parents' deaths. She also has a fear of heights.
- Sergey Belyaev as Viktor Sergeevich Yegorov, detective squad boss, Stas and Vera's friend.
- Nadezhda Borisova as Ksyukha "Ksyu", detective, investigates a young woman's drug-related death.
- Evgeniy Kharitonov as Artur, detective, divorced, tries to romance Ksyu.
- Pavel Vorozhtsov as Dima, detective, married to Nastya, father of three, has a low arrest rate.
- Mikhail Khimichev as Aleksey Anatolievich "Lyosha" Samartsev, Vera's superior, Lilya's domestic partner but tries to romance Vera.
- Ivan Zlobin as Anton Sointsev, first-year Psychology major, befriends Katya, amateur hang musician.
- Safiya Yarullina as Dina, first-year Psychology major, briefly befriends Katya.
- Dan Rozin as Igor Garik Orlov ("Garik"), fifth-year college student, plies girlfriends with alcohol and drugs.
- Nikita Kologrivyy as Artyom, Igor's drinking buddy, druggie.
- Ilya Kremnev as Gypsy, major drug dealer, promotes synthetic drug "Rad".
- Tatyana Zhuravlyova as Ira ("Katya's aunt"), who raised Katya after her parents died in 2008.
- Ekaterina Strogova as Lilya, Lyosha's partner, disgruntled by his infatuation with Vera.
- Yana Irteneva as NN / Nadya "Nadin" Novikova, Stas' informant, stripper-prostitute.
- Miriam Sekhon as Olga Dmitrieva "Olya" Savelieva ("Katya's mother"), widow of Ivan "Vanya" Saveliev, presumed dead in a 2008 house fire.
- Valeriya Krein as Sonya ("Vera's sister"), supports her after Stas' death.
- Kristina Yudicheva as Elena "Lena" Naumenko, 22-year-old, third-year college student. "Rad" overdose, corpse dumped in river.
- Elena Doronina as Tatiana Naumenko, Lena's mother, disputes drug-related suicide finding by police.
- Darya Kolpikova as Nastya, Dima's wife, mother of three.
- Olga Stashkevich as Anya, Artur's ex-wife, dumped by her lover, in intense pain awaiting surgery.
- Olesya Potashinskaya as Natalya Orlova, Igor's mother ("Garik's mother"), high-profile political candidate.
- Aleksandr Mizer as Dunya, major drug dealer, takes over Gypsy's operations, promotes "Rad".
- Nikolai Matchilskiy as Yura, another phantom, mentors Stas.
- Timofey Dunaev as "teacher", Psychology lecturer for Katya, Dina and Anton.
- Aleksey Yarmilko as "Stas' landlord", collects Stas' mail after his death.
- Denis Fomin as Reva ("criminal"), human trafficker, supplies brothels with young women, blackmails Dima.
- Andrey Smirennov as "criminal 2", van driver for Reva, gets arrested.
- Kristina Korbut as Rita, under-age prostitute.
- Ilya Gavrilenkov as "suicide ghost", Olya's rejected suitor, commits suicide, becomes a phantom, causes house fire, which kills Vanya.
- Denis Tkatchyov as "strip club administrator", brothel manager, supplies Dima with under-age prostitutes.
- Kuzhakhmeg Begaliev as "cabbie", witnesses Lena with two men outside nightclub.

== Episode guide ==
No.	Title	Directed by	Written by	Original release date
1	"Episode One"	Ilya Shekhovtsov	Anastasiya Volkova, Yuliya Baeva	November 23, 2020
Stas stands on a rooftop, his squad arrives but none acknowledge him. They find Stas' and Gypsy's bodies: concluding they killed each other. Flashback (12 hours earlier): Katya discovers Lena's corpse. Stas' squad investigate. Lena overdosed on "Rad". Ira drives Katya to college: Katya meets Dina. Vera tells Lena's mother about the overdose. Stas gets a tip: where Gypsy is tonight. Stas asks Vera for a warrant: he must first submit an official request. Stas collects his gun from the squad room and tells them he's getting Gypsy: without a warrant. Neither Artur nor Dima will assist. Ksyu tries to help but Stas refuses. At an abandoned pool, Gypsy starts shooting; Stas counts eight shots. On the rooftop he orders Gypsy to handcuff himself, when a third person shoots Stas. Katya discards her medication, ignores Ira and drives off. Stas' phantom leaves his body: a bright-lit doorway opens. He has a vision of Vera's shooting: decides to save her. At a nightclub Katya talks to Dina. Victor and Lyosha inform Vera of Stas' death. Katya drinks too much alcohol with Igor. Stas sights Gypsy's phone. Katya swerves her scooter to avoid Stas: she can see and hear him.
2	"Episode Two"	Ilya Shekhovtsov	Anastasiya Volkova, Yuliya Baeva	November 30, 2020
Flashback (2008): Ira rescues Katya from their house fire before re-entering for Vanya. Current: Stas remembers Vera's will be killed on her birthday. Vera obtains an ultrasound photo of her fetus. The squad blame each other for Stas' death. Stas tells Katya he died last night and became a phantom. She scoffs and goes to her lecture. Katya gets caught talking to Dina. The lecturer orders Katya down to the front. Stas frightens Katya until she faints. Artur and Ksyu find Stas' wedding ring. Igor organises a meet-up with Katya. Dima finds the last caller on Stas' phone was NN. Online, Katya reads about Stas' death. Stas gets Katya to recover Gypsy's phone: he promises to help find her parents' details. Dima returns Stas' effects to Vera, including his wedding ring. Katya delivers Gypsy's phone to Stas' precinct and warns Vera of danger. Vera believes it's a prank call. Dima hires an under-age prostitute. Ksyu checks Gypsy's phone: last call was from their squad room. Katya tries apologising to Igor but he shuns her. Anton consoles Katya but it backfires. Vera and Sonya find an unknown key in Stas' clothes. Stas' funeral is attended by his squad and family.
3	"Episode Three"	Ilya Shekhovtsov	Anastasiya Volkova, Yuliya Baeva	December 7, 2020
Yura instructs Stas: anger causes real-life effects. Vera sees Stas' has photos Nadin sent of her son. At college Katya and Anton work on a report. Artur meets a drug supplier. Lilya confronts Lyosha over his infatuation with Vera. Vera discovers Stas' unauthorised research into "Rad" in his lock-up. She alerts Lyosha and Victor. Vera finds Nadin is a stripper. Igor picks Katya up from college, shows her Natalya's billboard: explains his attention-seeking behavior. Igor drives Katya at over 120 km/h: Stas advises her to stop him. She gets out and walks off. Lyosha kisses Vera but she shrinks away. Flashback: Vera remembers her final fling with Stas before telling him to leave. Current: Ksyu meets Rubtsov, who orders her to update him. Dima hires a younger prostitute, Rita. Stas and Katya access police archives to find Vanya died in 2008 but Olya was sent to Bekhterev Psychiatric. Stas tells Katya not to go there yet but she drives off. Yura advises Stas to properly help Katya. Katya and Anton sneak into Bekhterev; Stas leads them to its archives. They remove Olya's files: she was discharged a year ago. Anya's nurse asks Artur for painkillers, he will provide them tomorrow.
4	"Episode Four"	Ilya Shekhovtsov	Anastasiya Volkova, Yuliya Baeva	December 14, 2020
Ksyu seduces Artur; also photographs his notebook. Ira leaves for work; Katya finds Olya's documents. Stas advises Katya to ask Ira about Olya. Forensics inform Vera: Lena dragged and dumped in the river. Security Services search Vera's flat for Stas' links to Gypsy. Vera goes to Nadin's strip club: Nadin lived nearby. Stas gets Katya to take Ksyu's phone to Artur's car. Using Stas' key, Vera enters Nadin's flat: finds photos of Nadin and son. Katya reads Olya's files. Vera informs Tatiana of investigating Lena's murder. Money stash discovered in Vera's flat. Artur returns Ksyu's phone. Igor takes Katya to a tattooist. Katya gets a fire symbol on her nape: same as Olya's. Artur trails Ksyu to meet Robtsov of Internal Affairs. Vera tells Sonya she was duped by Stas. Vera decides to abort her fetus. Katya kisses Igor but does not trust him. Igor organises another party: plenty of college girls, alcohol and "Rad". Vera asks Ksyu if Stas was having an affair: Ksyu denies it. Ksyu learns Nadin is a stripper. Rita laughs at Dima's impotence. Ira sees Katya's tattoo, realises Katya knows about Olya. Ira says Olya started the fire. Stas' landlord shows CCTV of Ksyu kissing Stas.
5	"Episode Five"	Ilya Shekhovtsov	Anastasiya Volkova, Yuliya Baeva	January 4, 2021
Katya remembers her house fire, "suicide ghost" taunts her: "your parents will never return." Victor suspends Ksyu for betraying their squad. Ksyu explains to Artur how Robtsov blackmailed her into spying. Vera barges in: slaps Ksyu for being Stas' mistress. Anton helps Katya: Olya is nearby as Ira visits her. Katya remembers Ira's summer house. Victor arrests "criminal 2", frees imprisoned women. "Criminal 2's" lawyer provides an escape route. Under Reva's orders, Dima runs down "criminal 2" and then burns him to death. Katya finds Olya at Ira's summer house, but Olya's not ready to meet Katya. Ksyu convinces Vera she was not Stas' mistress. Tells Vera where Nadin works. Anton brings Katya to a club, where his band perform. Its Igor's favorite venue, where Igor supplies alcohol and "Rad". Stas asks Katya to phone Artur: Dima's the mole and check burnt car. Dina kisses Igor as Katya approaches: Katya retaliates by kissing Anton. Katya takes "Rad": Anton saves her. Sonya decorates Vera's flat with "Happy Birthday" banner. Artur investigates burnt car: finds Dima's lighter. Stas spooks Dima: causes power surges. Nastya tells Dima: precinct called him in. Dima abducts Vera to her flat. Stas continues spooking Dima.
6	"Episode Six"	Ilya Shekhovtsov	Anastasiya Volkova, Yuliya Baeva	January 11, 2021
Stas spooks Dima. Nastya tells Victor: Dima went to precinct. Vera surreptitiously uses Stas' phone: calls Victor. He sends two units to her flat. Dima shoots at Victor but surrenders. Katya wakes at Anton's squat. Dima confirms link to Reva's brothels but denies link to Gyspy or killing Stas. A barmaid sends Artur to "cabbie", who says Lena left with two men. Katya returns home but spurns Olya. Stas talks to Katya, who asks him to leave. Olya agrees: Stas should go. Olya details how "suicide ghost" ruined her life. Yura warns Stas: his murderer is still unpunished. Igor apologises to Katya for "Rad" and asks for a final kiss. Vera and Nadin meet: she was Stas' informer not lover. She phoned Stas about Gyspy's "Rad" shipment at the abandoned pool. Dunya uses Gypsy's contacts book when taking over "Rad" distribution. Police raid Dunya's flat but Dunya drops book down a storey. Stas gets Katya to retrieve Dunya's book. She breaks Artur's car window: deposits the book. Artur tells Vera, who asks to unofficially assist them. Vera puts Stas' lucky bullet on her wall. Stas realises its not over yet. Police match Igor's name from Dunya's book with Lena's contacts.
7	"Episode Seven"	Ilya Shekhovtsov	Anastasiya Volkova, Yuliya Baeva	January 18, 2021
Natalya accompanies Igor to questioning. Vera asks why Igor's details are in Dunya's book and Lena's contacts. Natalya storms out: her lawyers will respond. Igor phones Katya threatening suicide. Vera tells Victor of Igor's connection to Lena. Lilya leaves Lyosha, due to his infatuation with Vera. Katya finds Igor: he's drunk and self-pitying. Katya tells him to fix things and stop lying. Igor phones someone: he's going to confess. Olya promises not to abandon Katya. Ksyu and Artur get "cabbie" to confirm Igor picked up Lena. Lilya has Lyosha's laptop, she sees photos of Vera and Stas: Lyosha was spying on them. Igor's corpse is found: another "Rad" overdose. Katya runs off to find Igor. Vera, Artur and Ksyu learn of Igor's death. Katya arrives at the scene, Stas warns her away: Igor's phantom has gone. Natalya accuses Vera of causing Igor's overdose by accusations. Olya tells Ira of Katya's fear of being committed. Vera's team see photos of Katya and Igor: they want to interview Katya. Katya asks Anton to hack Igor's accounts, Stas deduces Igor's passcode. They find photos of Igor, Lena and Artyom (Victor's son). Vera calls Victor to talk about Lena. Katya and Anton are arrested.
8	"Episode Eight"	Ilya Shekhovtsov	Anastasiya Volkova, Yuliya Baeva	January 25, 2021
Flashback: Lena, Igor and Artyom dance, then go to Artyom's flat. Igor pays Gypsy for "Rad". Gypsy copies a photo of Artyom with Victor. Artyom spikes Lena's drink with "Rad": she dies. Victor cleans up Artyom's mess and disposes of Lena's corpse. Current: Victor enters Vera's flat; sees her investigation of Lena and Igor. Ksyu and Artur question Katya. Vera deduced Igor supplied "Rad" to Lena, but he was helped by policeman. Victor concludes Vera has figured it out. Flashback: Gypsy blackmails Victor over Lena's disposal. Victor phones Gypsy of Stas' arrival. Later Victor kills them both. Current: Victor holds a gun on Vera. Stas tells Katya to convince Ksyu and Artur of Vera's danger. Stas returns and disrupts electricals. Victor repeatedly shoots: Vera is struck. Lyosha arrives and fights Victor, who is shot. Lyosha takes Vera to the hospital. Artur goes upstairs after Victor. Katya sees Vera at death's edge, her phantom rises. Vera wants to stay with Stas. He reminds Vera to save their daughter by returning to her body. Katya persuades Vera to let her go and not be mentioned in reports. Stas says goodbye to Katya. She goes to Anton: also convinces Olya to stay with Ira.
