= Wolf (Russian TV series) =

- Genre: Detective; Adventure; Drama; Historical
- Created by: Gennady Ostrovsky
- Written by: Gennady Ostrovsky
- Directed by: Gennady Ostrovsky
- Starring: Denis Shvedov; Sergey Makovetsky; Anton Vasilyev; Artur Smolyaninov; Marina Zudina
- Country of origin: Russia
- Original language: Russian
- No. of seasons: 1
- No. of episodes: 14

Production
- Executive producers: Ksenia Sokolova; Natalya Shishkina
- Producers: Timur Weinstein (general); Dzhanik Fayziev (general); Rafael Minasbekyan (general); Yulia Sumacheva (general); Oleg Blank; Sergey Bagirov; Alina Borisova (line); Igor Poptsov (music)
- Cinematography: Evgeny Privin
- Running time: 52 min.
- Production companies: KIT Film Studio; White Media

Original release
- Network: Premier; NTV
- Release: 7 December – 28 December 2020

Wolf (Russian: Волк) is a Russian detective television series based on the 2008 novel Stone Bridge by Alexander Terekhov. The series won the Russian national film award Nika in 2021.

The series premiered on 7 December 2020 on the Russian online service Premier. New episodes were released weekly on Mondays and Thursdays, and the final episode was released on 28 December 2020.

The television premiere took place on 27 December 2021 on the NTV channel at 20:00, with episodes airing Monday through Thursday.

== Plot ==
Wolf follows former intelligence officer Alexander Volk, who is freed from captivity by retired KGB general Yakov Goldman on the condition that he investigate the decades-old murder of Goldman’s son. The investigation uncovers the 1943 death of Nina Umanskaya, daughter of Soviet ambassador Konstantin Umansky, on Moscow’s Stone Bridge, entwining a web of historical crimes, political intrigue, and hidden secrets from the Stalinist era.

Central to the story is the antagonist Nikolai “Bezruk” Dolgov, a former orphan and NKVD operative whose actions shaped the fate of Nina, her classmate Sonia Rykova, and Vladimir Shakhurin, Nina’s childhood companion. Sonia betrays the teenagers, and later becomes entangled with Bezruk in a complex dynamic of captivity and trauma-bonding. Years later, Bezruk manipulates evidence to convince Nina’s father she survived, while secretly consolidating power as a ruthless industrial magnate.

Volk investigates multiple timelines and overlapping narratives, reconstructing the events surrounding the murders of Nina Umanskaya, Vladimir Shakhurin, and other historical figures. He uncovers the role of Nikolai Dolgov in the killings and in manipulating evidence to mislead Umanskaya’s father. Despite tracing the criminal activities and the consolidation of Dolgov’s power as an industrial magnate, Volk is unable to obtain sufficient legal evidence to prosecute him. The series concludes with the historical crimes exposed, while Dolgov remains alive and influential, and the consequences of past actions continue to affect the present.

== Cast ==
- Denis Shvedov as Alexander Vasilievich Volk, intelligence officer
- Sergey Makovetsky as Konstantin Umansky, Soviet ambassador to the U.S.
- Anton Vasilyev as Boris Mirgorodsky, Volk’s ally and assistant
- Artur Smolyaninov as Nikolay Bezruk
- Varvara Feofanova as Nina Umanskaya
- Alevtina Tukan as Sonya Rykova
- Vitaly Andreyev as Vladimir Shakhurin
- Vitaly Khayev as Lev Vasilevsky, Soviet intelligence officer
- Igor Mirkurbanov as Nahum Eitingon, NKVD officer
- Marina Zudina as Raisa Umanskaya
- Elena Podkaminskaya as Anastasia “Tasya” Petrova
- Alexander Semchev as Artur Yanovich Kipnis, historian and tour guide
- Linda Lapinsh as Alyona
- Viktor Proskurin as Nikolai Yefremovich Dolgov
- Igor Yasulovich as Vyacheslav Semyonovich Dashkevich
- Gregory-Said Bagov as Lavrentiy Beria
- Ilya Lyubimov as Leonid Yakovlevich Goldman, collector
- Aristarkh Livanov as Ivan Alexandrovich Sukhikh
- Anatoly Kot as Gorevoy
- Evgeny Pronin as Pyotr Chuyev
- Alyona Mikhailova as Masha, Dashkevich’s granddaughter
- Vyacheslav Chepurchenko as Yury
- Konstantin Zheldin as Yakov Mikhailovich Goldman, retired major-general of the KGB
- Malkhaz Abuladze as Joseph Stalin
- Alexandra Nazarova as Era Pavlovna
- Nina Drobycheva as Iskra Petrova

== Awards ==
- 2021 — Nika Award, Special Prize of the Academy Council “For creative achievements in the art of television cinematography”.
