= Evgeniya Brik =

Russian actress (1981–2022)

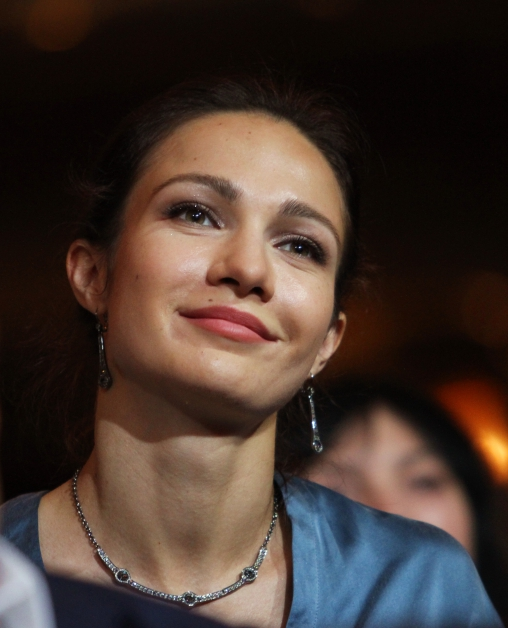
- Khirivskaya at the 2013 Odesa International Film Festival
- Born: Evgeniya Vladimirovna Khirivskaya; 3 September 1981; Moscow, Russian SFSR, Soviet Union
- Died: 10 February 2022 (aged 40); Los Angeles, California, U.S.
- Occupations: Actress, radio host, child model
- Years active: 2000–2022
- Spouse: Valery Todorovsky (m. 2006)
- Children: 1

Evgeniya Brik (Russian: Евгения Брик, née Khirivskaya (Хиривская), 3 September 1981 – 10 February 2022) was a Russian film and theater actress. She gained popularity with such films and television series as Stilyagi (2008), The Geographer Drank His Globe Away (2013), Thaw (2013), Yolki 1914 (2014), Adaptation (2017), and Odessa (2019). She is also known for playing Kalinka character in the Belgian television series Matroesjka's. Brik was a winner of the Golden Eagle Award (2020) and a nominee for the Nika Award (2009).

== Life and career ==
Evgenia Vladimirovna Khirivskaya was born on 3 September 1981 in Moscow. She was named after her paternal grandfather Yevgeny Abramovich Krein, who was a famous journalist. The actress took the surname Brik in honor of her paternal great-grandmother Sofia Brik, as a stage name. However, despite marriage and adopting a stage name, she never changed her legal documentation, thus keeping her maiden last name. She has Polish and Jewish ancestry.

At the age of 5, she successfully completed tryouts and was invited to work as a child model at the All-Union House of Fashion Design. In elementary and middle school, she focused on learning English, before applying for and graduating from a theater prep school. She also graduated from a music school as a classically trained pianist.

She studied at the Russian Academy of Theatre Arts and obtained her diploma in 2004.

In Russia, her breakthrough role was Katya, a university Komsomol unit leader, in the 2008 musical comedy-drama Stilyagi.

== Personal life and death ==
Brik was married to director Valery Todorovsky, with whom she had a daughter, Zoey Valeryevna Todorovskaya, born in 2009 in Los Angeles. Zoey had her acting debut as young Prairie Johnson in The OA, a 2016 Netflix Original series. Brik died from cancer on 10 February 2022, at the age of 40.

== Filmography ==
Year	Title	Role
2000	Marsh Turetskogo	Anastasia Kitaeva
2003	Kamenskaya	Oksana
2004	Rates for love	
2004	Men Do not Cry	Lydia Kholodova / Vera Kayurova / Lena Kusova
2005	Matroesjka's	Kalinka
2006	Call	Natasha
2008	Hipsters	Katya
2012	Revolve	Anael
2013	The Geographer Drank His Globe Away	Kira
2014	Yolki 1914	Bella
2016	Friday	Elena Antonova
2017	Moscow Never Sleeps	Anna
2019	Mistresses	Anna
2019	Odesa	Mira
Year	Title	Role
2001	Northern Lights	
2002	Podmoskovnaya Elegy	Lala
2006	The Count of Montenegro	Slavka
2006	Filipp's Bay	Anastasia Gromova
2007	Vices	Taya
2008	Love as a motive	Dina
2008	S. S. D.	Jana
2009	Given Circumstances	Inga
2010	White dress	Irina
2010	Adult daughter, or test...	Marina
2011	Deliver at any cost	Asya
2013	The Thaw	Larissa
2018	The Romanoffs	Katrina
2020	Phantom	Vera Khabarova
