= Seven Seconds (TV series) =

2018 American crime drama television series on Netflix

- Genre: Crime drama
- Created by: Veena Sud
- Based on: The Major by Yuri Bykov
- Starring: Clare-Hope Ashitey; Beau Knapp; Michael Mosley; David Lyons; Russell Hornsby; Raúl Castillo; Patrick Murney; Zackary Momoh; Michelle Veintimilla; Regina King
- Country of origin: United States
- Original language: English
- No. of seasons: 1
- No. of episodes: 10

Production
- Executive producers: Veena Sud; Gavin O'Connor; Lawrence Bender; Kevin Kelly Brown; Alex Reznik; Dan Nowak
- Producers: Jonathan Filley; Shana Fishcer Huber
- Running time: 54–80 minutes
- Production companies: KMF Films; Bender Brown Productions; Filmtribe; Fox 21 Television Studios

Original release
- Network: Netflix
- Release: February 23, 2018

Seven Seconds is an American crime drama television series, based on the Russian film The Major, written and directed by Yuri Bykov. The series premiered on February 23, 2018, on Netflix.

The series, which is created, executive produced, and showrun by Veena Sud, follows the people involved in investigating the death of a Black teenager and his family as they reel after the loss. On April 18, 2018, Netflix confirmed there would not be a second season, deeming it a limited series.

== Premise ==
Peter Jablonski, a white Polish-American Narcotics Detective in Jersey City, New Jersey, accidentally hits and critically injures Black teenager Brenton Butler with his car. Jablonski is in shock, and calls his fellow police officers from the Narcotics Division to join him at the scene. Crooked officer Mike DiAngelo, who does business with drug dealers, takes charge of the matter, assumes Brenton is dead, and orders the others to perform a cover-up. Racial tensions explode in the face of injustice and the absence of quick resolution to the case.

== Cast and characters ==
=== Main ===
- Clare-Hope Ashitey as K.J. Harper
- Beau Knapp as Peter Jablonski
- Michael Mosley as Joe “Fish” Rinaldi
- David Lyons as Mike DiAngelo
- Russell Hornsby as Isaiah Butler
- Raúl Castillo as Felix Osorio
- Patrick Murney as Manny Wilcox
- Zackary Momoh as Seth Butler
- Michelle Veintimilla as Marie Jablonski
- Regina King as Latrice Butler

=== Recurring ===
- Corey Champagne as Kadeuce Porter
- Nadia Alexander as Nadine MacAllister
- Melanie Nicholls-King as Marcelle
- Coley Mustafa Speaks as Messiah
- Adriana DeMeo as Teresa
- Jeremy Davidson as James Connelly
- Sawyer Niehaus as Maggie Rinaldi
- Gretchen Mol as Sam Hennessy
- Lou Martini Jr. as Barry Piumetti

== Episodes ==
No.	Title	Directed by	Written by	Original release date
1	"Pilot"	Gavin O'Connor	Veena Sud	February 23, 2018
2	"Brenton's Breath"	Jonathan Demme	Veena Sud	February 23, 2018
3	"Matters of Life and Death"	Jon Amiel	J. David Shanks	February 23, 2018
4	"That What Follows"	Tanya Hamilton	Dan Nowak	February 23, 2018
5	"Of Gods and Men"	Coky Giedroyc	Shalisha Francis	February 23, 2018
6	"Until It Do"	Ernest Dickerson	Francesca Sloane	February 23, 2018
7	"Boxed Devil"	Ed Bianchi	Rhett Rossi	February 23, 2018
8	"Bailed Out"	Dan Attias	Evangeline Ordaz	February 23, 2018
9	"Witnesses for the Prosecution"	Victoria Mahoney	John Lopez	February 23, 2018
10	"A Boy and a Bike"	Ed Bianchi	Veena Sud & Shalisha Francis	February 23, 2018

== Production ==
=== Development ===
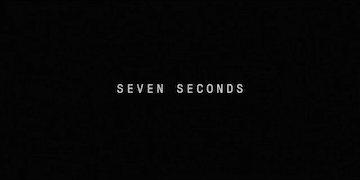
Title card for the Netflix series Seven Seconds.

On October 18, 2016, it was announced that Netflix had given the production a one season series order consisting of 10 episodes. The series was created by Veena Sud with Gavin O'Connor attached to direct. Sud and O’Connor were expected to executive produce alongside Lawrence Bender, Kevin Brown, and Alex Reznik. Production companies involved with the show include Fox 21 TV Studios.

On April 18, 2018, Netflix announced they were not renewing the series for a second season, leaving the crimes – including murder – by Jablonski's crooked fellow officers unresolved.

=== Casting ===
On October 25, 2016, it was announced that David Lyons and Beau Knapp had joined the show as series regulars. On November 17, 2016, Russell Hornsby, Raul Castillo, and Zackary Momoh joined the main cast. Later that month, Michael Mosley and Patrick Murney were cast as series regulars as well. On December 1, 2016, it was confirmed that Regina King had been cast in the series regular role of Latrice Butler. A few weeks later, Clare-Hope Ashitey was cast in the series' lead role of K.J. Harper.

== Release ==
On January 24, 2018, Netflix released the official trailer for the series and a collection of first look images.

== Reception ==
=== Critical response ===
The series has received a positive reception from critics. On the review aggregation website Rotten Tomatoes, the series holds a 78% approval rating with an average rating of 6.02 out of 10 based on 44 reviews. The website's critical consensus reads, "Seven Seconds is undermined by unlikable characters with somewhat predictable arcs, but its grim reflections of societal and racial division are brought to life by able performers and a fearless overall narrative." Metacritic, which uses a weighted average, assigned the series a score of 68 out of 100 based on 20 critics.

=== Awards and nominations ===
Award	Category	Nominee(s)	Result	Ref.
2nd Black Reel Awards for Television	Outstanding Television Movie or Limited Series	Seven Seconds	Won	
2nd Black Reel Awards for Television	Outstanding Actress, TV Movie or Limited Series	Regina King	Won	
2nd Black Reel Awards for Television	Outstanding Supporting Actor, TV Movie or Limited Series	Corey Champagne	Nominated	
2nd Black Reel Awards for Television	Outstanding Supporting Actor, TV Movie or Limited Series	Russell Hornsby	Won	
2nd Black Reel Awards for Television	Outstanding Directing, TV Movie or Limited Series	Ernest Dickerson	Nominated	
2nd Black Reel Awards for Television	Outstanding Directing, TV Movie or Limited Series	Victoria Mahoney	Nominated	
2nd Black Reel Awards for Television	Outstanding Writing, TV Movie or Limited Series	Veena Sud & Shalisha Francis	Won	
70th Primetime Emmy Awards	Outstanding Lead Actress in a Limited Series or Movie	Regina King	Won	
76th Golden Globe Awards	Best Actress – Miniseries or Television Film	Regina King	Nominated	
