= Vladislav Kotlyarsky =

Russian film and theater actor (born 1972)

- Born: Vladislav Yurievich Kotlyarsky; 2 August 1972 (age 54); Moscow, RSFSR, USSR
- Education: Russian Institute of Theatre Arts
- Occupation: actor
- Years active: 1990–present

Vladislav Yurievich Kotlyarsky (Russian: Владисла́в Ю́рьевич Котля́рский; born 2 August 1972, Moscow) is a Russian film, television and theatre actor. He is best known for his role as police major Stanislav Karpov in the crime television series Glukhar since 2008.

In 2002 he graduated from the directing department of the GITIS (Andrey Goncharov's course).

== Public political views ==
In 2019, Kotlyarsky condemned the actions of the Moscow police during the Moscow protests, describing them as unnecessarily violent and illegal.

On 24 February 2022, Vladislav spoke out against Russia's military invasion of Ukraine.

== Selected filmography ==
- Children of the Arbat (2004) as episode
- Penal Battalion (2004) as Major Gnedyuk
- Nasha Russia (2008) as representative man (season 3, episode 16)
- Glukhar (2008–2011) as Stanislav Karpov (95 episodes)
- Forbidden Reality (2009) as Baboon Face's driver
- Interns (2012) as police major
- The Junior Team (2018) as investigator Poryvaev
- The Factory (2018) as prosecutor

== Awards and nominations ==
2013

- APKIT Award: Best Actor in a TV Movie/Series in Karpov (nom)

== Personal life ==
He married actress Victoria Boldyreva (born 1987) in the winter of 2016. Daughters Elina and Nicole.
