= To Live (2010 film) =

- Directed by: Yuri Bykov
- Written by: Yuri Bykov
- Produced by: Alexei Uchitel; Kira Saksaganskaya
- Starring: Sergei Belyayev; Aleksei Komashko; Denis Shvedov; Sergey Sosnovsky; Konstantin Strelnikov; Vladislav Toldykov; Sergey Zharkov
- Cinematography: Ivan Burlakov
- Edited by: Yuri Bykov
- Music by: Yuri Bykov
- Distributed by: Rock Studios
- Release dates: 3 November 2010 (Pegards de Russie); 9 December 2010
- Running time: 74 minutes
- Country: Russia
- Language: Russian

To Live (Russian: 'Жить', romanized: Zhit) is a 2010 Russian drama film written, directed by Yuri Bykov. It is his debut film. It premiered at the Kinotavr Film Festival.

== Plot ==
In the Russian countryside, Mikhail is hunting when he encounters Andrey, a criminal who is running from three men who are trying to kill him. They are compelled to try to escape together, first in Mikhail's car, then on foot, while tension builds between them.

== Cast ==
- Vladislav Toldykov as Mikhail
- Denis Shvedov as Andrey
- Sergei Belyayev as fisherman
- Aleksei Komashko as Sergey
- Sergey Sosnovsky as old man
- Konstantin Strelnikov as Oleg
- Sergey Zharkov as Ivan

== Reception ==
Variety described the film as "[a]n impressively confident feature debut", while noting that it had been the subject of controversy due to the "onscreen death of an animal" (although the film's credits state that no animal was actually harmed).

== Awards and nominations ==
- First feature film Prize in International Human Rights Film Festival, 2010
