= The Method (TV series) =

Russian television drama series

- Genre: Crime drama; Psychological thriller; Black comedy; Mystery; Police procedural
- Directed by: Yuri Bykov (Season 1); Alexander Voitinsky (Season 2)
- Starring: Konstantin Khabensky; Paulina Andreeva; Alexander Tsekalo; Aleksander Petrov; Yekaterina Dubakina; Zakhar Kabanov; Timofey Tribuntsev; Natalia Ungard; Valentin Samokhin; Sergei Belyaev; Yan Tsapnik
- Narrated by: Konstantin Khabensky
- Composer: Ryan Otter
- Country of origin: Russia
- No. of seasons: 2
- No. of episodes: 32

Production
- Executive producer: Irina Baskakova
- Producers: Alexander Tsekalo; Konstantin Ernst; Maxim Polisnky; Nikolai Bulygin; Ivan Samohvalov
- Production locations: Nizhny Novgorod; Moscow
- Running time: 50–55 minutes
- Production company: Sreda

Original release
- Network: 1TV
- Release: 18 October 2015

The Method (Russian: Метод) is a Russian crime drama television series, produced by Sreda, starring Konstantin Khabensky and Paulina Andreeva.

The first episode aired on Channel One on 18 October 2015. Principal photography was done in Nizhny Novgorod.

The second season began on 8 November 2020 on Channel One.

== Plot ==
The series centers on Rodion Meglin (Konstantin Khabensky), a highest level investigator of the Russian police who is also a sanctioned vigilante, hunting down the criminally insane ("maniacs" in Russian) who slip through the cracks of an ill-suited justice system. He's used to working alone, never revealing the secrets of his method. A young law school graduate, Esenia Steklova (Paulina Andreeva), is assigned to the department of the Investigative Committee where Meglin serves, becoming his trainee. Esenia has personal motives for working with the famous investigator - her mother was killed under mysterious circumstances, while her father hides key details of what happened. She's given up hope of finding the murderer, but wants to learn as much as she can from the seasoned investigator. Throughout the series, Esenia encounters unexpected challenges working with Meglin.

== Cast ==
- Konstantin Khabensky — Rodion Meglin
- Paulina Andreeva — Esenia Steklova
- Alexander Petrov — Zhenya
- Makar Zaporozhskiy — Sasha
- Alexander Tsekalo — "Festive Killer"
- Yekaterina Dubakina — Ania Zakharova
- Zakhar Kabanov — Pasha Orlov
- Timofey Tribuntsev — Kolya
- Valentin Samokhin — Andrey Zhukov
- Sergei Belyaev — Egorov
- Yan Tsapnik — Zhora
- Ivan Dobronravov — Pavlik Tolmachyov
- Aleksei Serebryakov — Anufriev
- Vitali Kishchenko — Andrey Steklov, Esenia's father
- Yuri Kolokolnikov — Michael Ptaha
- Sergey Sosnovsky — Vadim Bergich, psychiatrist
- Kirill Polukhin — Egor Alexandrovich Bykov ("Gray"), detective
- Yuri Bykov — "Thin", detective
- Igor Savochkin — Vyacheslav (the kidnapper of the girls "Summer resident")
- Yevgeniya Simonova — Sofya Zinovievna, teacher

== Production ==
The creators of the Russian TV series reject the similarities of their work with the American TV show Dexter, but do confirm some commonality with the True Detective series.

== Awards ==
The series won three awards at TEFI in 2016;

- Best television film / TV series
- Best actor in a television film / series (Konstantin Khabensky)
- Best television producer of the season (Alexander Tsekalo for select episodes).
