= The Adventurers (2014 film) =

- Directed by: Konstantin Buslov
- Written by: Denis Rodimin; Yulia Idlis
- Produced by: Alexander Rodnyansky; Sergei Melkumov
- Starring: Konstantin Khabensky; Svetlana Khodchenkova; Denis Shvedov
- Cinematography: Sergei Machilsky
- Production company: Non-Stop Production
- Distributed by: 20th Century Fox
- Release date: 10 April 2014
- Running time: 90 minutes
- Country: Russia
- Language: Russian

The Adventurers (Russian: Авантюристы, romanized: Avantyuristy) is a 2014 Russian adventure film directed by Konstantin Buslov.

The film's plot bears strong similarity to the 1967 film The Last Adventure.

== Plot ==
Katya and Andrey arrive in Malta on the eve of their wedding and they coincidentally encounter Max in a diving center, a scuba diver and Katya's former fiancé. Max suggests that they all begin diving together. During one of the dives, Katya finds a fragment of a life jacket with the number of a German submarine from the time of the Second World War. After investigating, the guys find out that in 1942, members of the SS stole ancient Egyptian relics from the Maltese Order of Hospitallers, which should have been delivered to Germany. However the treasures failed to reach their destination. They decide that the drowned submarine must be somewhere around the Maltese beaches. Katya, Andrei and Max become immersed in the quest for treasure and a love triangle develops between them.

== Cast ==
- Konstantin Khabensky as Max
- Svetlana Khodchenkova as Katya
- Denis Shvedov as Andrei

== Production ==
The picture was shot on location in Malta.

Svetlana Khodchenkova took courses on diving before the film. Konstantin Khabensky did scuba diving for many years.

During one scene Khabensky's gas cylinder was not filled with air which caused the actor to almost drown.
