= The Fool (2014 film) =

- Film poster
- Directed by: Yuri Bykov
- Written by: Yuri Bykov
- Produced by: Alexey Uchitel; Kira Saksaganskaya
- Starring: Artyom Bystrov; Boris Nevzorov; Natalya Surkova; Kirill Polukhin; Yuri Tsurilo; Darya Moroz; Irina Nizina; Alexander Korshunov; Maxim Pinsker; Sergei Artsibashev; Olga Samoshina; Yelena Panova; Ilya Isaev; Dmitry Kulitchkov; Pyotr Barancheev
- Cinematography: Kirill Klepalov
- Edited by: Yuri Bykov
- Music by: Yuri Bykov
- Distributed by: Rock Studios; Bazelevs; Premium Film
- Release dates: 6 June 2014 (Open Russian Film Festival Kinotavr); 9 August 2014 (Locarno International Film Festival)
- Running time: 116 minutes
- Country: Russia
- Language: Russian
- Budget: $1.3 million

The Fool (Russian: Дурак, romanized: Durak) is a 2014 Russian crime drama film written and directed by Yuri Bykov. It had its international premiere at the 2014 Locarno International Film Festival, where it won the Best Actor Award (Bystrov) and Prize of the Ecumenical Jury.

This is the third film of writer and director Yury Bykov. The Fool is a 2014 Russian realistic melodrama, and displays the tragic attempt of how integrity and courage cannot fix the corruption of the governments and the indolence of society to combat it. The film received generally positive reviews.

== Plot ==
Dima Nikitin, a plumber, is a municipal repair-crew chief living in an unnamed Russian town. Determined to improve his family's finances by attending engineering school, he is negatively affected by his cynical community. He lives with his hasty mother, apathetic father, and wife and son. When Nikitin discovers a leaky pipe in a building and goes outside to inspect a related crack in the wall, he notices the entire building is leaning.

Determining the building will collapse within the next 24 hours, the compassionate Nikitin attempts to alert authorities: Arriving at a birthday party for Mayor Nina Galaganova, he realizes everyone is too intoxicated to understand the severity as they dismiss the validity of Nikitin's claim with various cynical jokes. They finally become concerned once they realize they will be publicly ruined after the collapse. They begin to criticize each other the corruption they all participate in until they are faced with the difficulty of abruptly trying to relocate the building's 820 residents.

Galaganova sends Public Housing Inspector Fedotov and Fire Chief Matyugin to assess the damage with Nikitin. The officials accept that the building will collapse after Nikitin demonstrates the tilt by rolling a bottle off the building's roof. They report their findings to Galaganova and her political entourage who all realize that an evacuation of this scale would cause a financial review and reveal years of administrative corruption.

Galaganova and Deputy Mayor Bogachyov decide to pin the expected building collapse on Fedotov and Matyugin. Nikitin, Fedotov, and Matyugin are told by Police Chief Sayapin that arrangements are being made for evacuation. The three men are put into a police van allegedly to meet Galaganova, but instead, they are driven to a remote location on the city outskirts. Fedotov and Matyugin realize that Galaganova wants to eliminate them and use them as scapegoats for the collapse. Fedotov pleads with the policemen to release Nikitin and they reluctantly agree, instructing him to leave the city with his family immediately. Matyugin and Fedotov are executed.

As Nikitin attempts to leave town with his family, he realizes no one is evacuating the building. When his wife Masha scolds him for wanting to help the residents, who are "nobodies", he says, "We live like animals and we die like animals because we are nobodies to each other." He tells her to leave and, taking matters into his own hands, goes from door to door urging residents to leave before the building collapses. As the residents all gather outside, they soon become annoyed by the disruption and decide they do not believe him. The final scene shows Nikitin laying in a fetal position after the angry residents all attack and severely beat him.

== Cast ==
- Artyom Bystrov as Dima Nikitin, an idealistic plumber
- Natalya Surkova as Nina Galaganova, town mayor
- Darya Moroz as Masha, Dima's wife
- Boris Nevzorov as Fedotov, deceitful boss of Dima
- Yuriy Tsurilo as Bogachyov, deputy mayor
- Kirill Polukhin as Matyugin, fire chief
- Maksim Pinsker as Sayapin, police chief
- Sergei Artsibashev as Tulsky, head of healthcare department
- Aleksandr Korshunov as Ivan, Dima's apathetic father
- Olga Samoshina as Antonina, Dima's hasty mother
- Dmitry Kulichkov as the alcoholic resident of the building
- Yelena Panova as the alcoholic's wife

== Reception ==
=== Critical response ===
The Fool has received generally positive reviews from critics. On Rotten Tomatoes, the film holds a rating of 93%, based on 14 reviews, with an average rating of 7.7/10. On Metacritic the film has a score of 83 out of 100, based on 7 critics, indicating "universal acclaim".

Peter Debruge of Variety magazine wrote: "Frank Capra would have approved of The Fool, a forceful Russian drama in which a lone plumber stands up to a corrupt system on behalf of the people living in a squalid apartment building."

In 2018 users of the Russian movie database KinoPoisk voted it to be the best Russian movie made in the past 15 years.

=== Awards and nominations ===
- Gorin Prize for the Best Script, Open Russian Film Festival Kinotavr in Sochi, 2014
- Best Actor Leopard, awarded to Artyom Bystrov, Locarno International Film Festival, 2014
- Ecumenical Prize, Locarno International Film Festival, 2014
- Junior Jury Award, First Prize, Locarno International Film Festival, 2014
- Atlas d’Argent de la mise en scène (silver prize), Arras Film Festival, 2014
- Audience Choice Award, Arras Film Festival, 2014
- Young Jury Prize, Arras Film Festival, 2014
- Flèche de Cristal, Festival de cinéma européen des Arcs, 2014
- Best Cinematography Prize, awarded to Kirill Klepalov, Festival de cinéma européen des Arcs, 2014
- Youth Jury Award, Festival de cinéma européen des Arcs, 2014
- Best Screenplay, Dublin Film Critics Circle Awards, Jameson Dublin International Film Festival, 2015
