= Boris Nevzorov =

Russian actor (1950–2022)

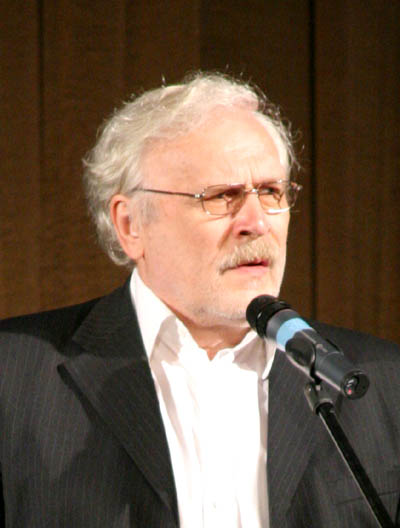
- Born: Boris Georgievich Nevzorov; 18 January 1950; Starominskaya village, Krasnodar Krai, RSFSR, USSR
- Died: 18 February 2022 (aged 72); Moscow, Russia
- Occupations: actor film director
- Years active: 1967–2022

Boris Georgievich Nevzorov (Russian: Бори́с Гео́ргиевич Невзо́ров; 18 January 1950 – 18 February 2022) was a Russian actor and film director.

He was an Honored Artist of the Russian Federation (1997) and a People's Artist of Russia (2011).

== Life and career ==
Nevzorov spent his childhood and youth in Astrakhan. In 1967 and 1968, he was an actor of the Astrakhan Youth Theatre.

=== Theatre ===
In 1968 he entered the Mikhail Shchepkin Higher Theatre School, where he studied for two courses. In 1975 he graduated from the Moscow Art Theatre School. From 1975 to 1982, he was in the troupe of the Moscow New Drama Theatre. From 1984 to 1986 he was an actor at the Mossovet Theatre, then returned to the Moscow New Drama Theatre, where he worked until 1988. From 1988 to 1989 he worked in Moscow Gogol Drama Theatre. From 1993 to 2005, he was an actor of the Electrotheatre Stanislavsky. From 2005 until the end of his life he worked in the Maly Theater.

He taught at the Russian Institute of Theatre Arts.

=== Film career ===
He made his film debut in 1975 film Road. From 1989 to 1991, he worked at the Gorky Film Studio. He played Fedotov in drama The Fool.

He was the recipient of Vasilyev Brothers State Prize of the RSFSR.

=== Death ===
Nevzorov died from complications of COVID-19 in Moscow on 18 February 2022, at the age of 72.

== Selected filmography ==
=== Actor ===
- Red Bells II (1982) as Konstantin Eremeev
- Find and Neutralize (1982) as Fyodor
- Primary Russia (1985) as Ivan Ermolaevich Sedunov
- Capablanca (1986) as Valerian Yeremeyev
- Stalingrad (1989) as Nikolay Krylov
- The Shore of Salvation (1990) as Semyon Nikulin
- The Flood (1994) as Trofim
- Kamenskaya (1999) as Olshansky
- Hot Ice (2009) as coach Trofimov
- The Major (2013) as Head of the Department of Internal Affairs
- The Fool (2014) as Fedotov
- Sophia (2016) as Mamon
- The Last Minister (2020) as Gavryutin
