= How I Became Russian =

- Traditional Chinese: 戰鬥民族養成記
- Simplified Chinese: 战斗民族养成记
- Hanyu Pinyin: Zhàndòu Mínzú Yǎngchéng Jì
- Directed by: Xia Hao; Akaki Sakhelashvili
- Written by: Andrey Zolotarev; Lei Guanglin
- Produced by: Fang Qianli; Georgy Shabanov
- Starring: Dong Chang; Vitaliy Khaev; Elizaveta Kononowa; Sergey Chirkov
- Cinematography: Yu Qingwei
- Edited by: Du Yu
- Music by: Dmitry Lanskoy
- Production companies: Huace Film&TV; U. Lan Media; Qingdao West Coast Cultural Industry Investment Co., Ltd; All Media
- Distributed by: Huace Film&TV
- Release dates: 17 January 2019 (Russia); 24 January 2019 (China)
- Running time: 93 minutes
- Countries: China; Russia
- Languages: Mandarin; Russian

How I Became Russian (Chinese: 战斗民族养成记; Russian: Как я стал русским) is a 2019 Chinese-Russian romantic comedy film directed by Xia Hao and Akaki Sakhelashvili, written by Andrey Zolotarev and Lei Guanglin, and starring Dong Chang, Vitaliy Khaev, Elizaveta Kononowa, and Sergey Chirkov. The film is an adaptation of the 2015 Russian comedy television series of the same name. The film premiered in Russia on 17 January 2019, and opened in China on 24 January 2019. The film follows a young Chinese man named Peng Peng as he tries to win the right to marry the Russian woman he fell in love with by overcoming trials that his would-be father-in-law creates for him.

== Cast ==
- Dong Chang as Peng Peng, Protagonist and Ira's boyfriend.
- Vitaliy Khaev as Anatoliy Platonov, Ira's father.
- Elizaveta Kononowa as Ira Platanova, Peng's girlfriend.
- Sergey Chirkov as Roman Andreevich Bistrov
- Hrant Tokhatyan as Ruben
- Natalya Surkova as female cook
- Sergey Sosnovsky as Fyodor
- Wu Yuyao as Peng Cheng
- Yang Zhiying as Peng's mother
- Li Yuwen as Peng's father
- Sheng Caixin as Grandpa
- Hong Bingyao as Hong Shisi
- Bai Feimeng as a heavy man nicknamed "Fatty"
- Luo Zhouhong as an old aunt

== Production ==
This film was shot in both Russia and China. Filming took place in Moscow, Beijing, and Shanghai in 2018.

== Release ==
In November 2018, the producers announced that the film was scheduled for release on January 24, 2019.

Douban gave the drama 4.7 out of 10.
