= Igor Mirkurbanov =

Soviet-Russian-Israeli actor and director

- Игорь Миркурбанов
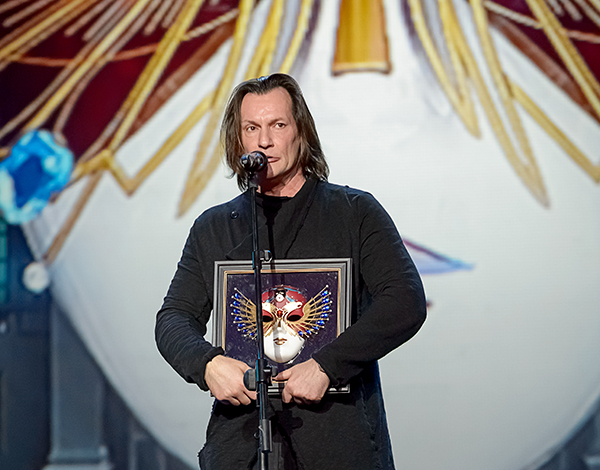
- Mirkurbanov gets Golden Mask in 2015
- Born: Igor Vitalievich Mirkurbanov; October 2, 1964 (age 62); Shymkent, Soviet Union
- Occupation: actor
- Years active: 1990-present
- Awards: Golden Mask (2015); Crystal Turandot (2015)

Igor Vitalievich Mirkurbanov (Russian: Игорь Витальевич Миркурбанов, Hebrew: איגור מירקובורנוב; born 1964) is a Soviet, Russian and Israeli actor, director.

== Biography ==
He studied in several technical universities. In 1985 he graduated from the Novosibirsk Conservatoire, conductor faculties, departments conducting the specialty symphony orchestra conductor.

In 1990 he graduated from the directing department GITIS specialty acting (workshop Andrey Goncharov and Mark Zakharov)

Prior to 1992 — an actor of the Mayakovsky Theatre.

From 1992 to 2002 — actor Gesher Theater (Israel).

He was the director and host of Double Impact and Tormozov.net on Israeli TV.

He taught at the theater school of Beit Zvi.

Participant and winner of prestigious international theater festivals (Vienna, Avignon, Edinburgh, Paris, Basel, Rome, Melbourne, Tokyo, New York).

He collaborated with the theater Hausmann (Bochum, Germany), Suzuki (Toga, Shizuoka, Japan), the Taganka Theatre (Moscow).

Since 2013 — actor Chekhov Moscow Art Theatre. He takes part in the performances of the Moscow Theater Studio Tabakov and Moscow Lenkom Theatre.

== Honours and awards ==
Winner of the Theatre Award Golden Mask — 2015 in the Drama / Actor for his work in the play of Konstantin Bogomolov Karamazov in the Chekhov Moscow Art Theatre (Fyodor Karamazov).

Winner of the theatrical award Crystal Turandot — 2015 in the category Best Actor for his work in the play by Mark Zakharov Walpurgis Night in the Moscow theater Lenkom (Venichka Yerofeyev).

== Actors works ==
=== Stage ===
- Theatre of the тime of Nero and Seneca (Edvard Radzinsky) as Nero
- Rosencrantz and Guildenstern Are Dead (Tom Stoppard) as Actor
- The Idiot (Fyodor Dostoyevsky) as Rogozhin
- Tartuffe (Molière) as Tartuffe
- The Threepenny Opera (Bertolt Brecht) as Mackie Messer

=== Filmography ===
- 1991 — Behind the Last Line as Tolyan
- 1991 — Blood for Вlood as Narik Minosyan
- 1992 — Go and Do Not Look Back as Vadim Larin
- 2001 — Made in Israel as Vitali
- 2006 — Dots as Vadim
- 2006 — Breathing as Mikhail
- 2006 — Young and Еvil as Anton Grekov
- 2007 — A sign of Destiny as Pavel Konstantinovich Kazantsev
- 2008 — Montana as Victor
- 2011 — Split as Manfred
- 2011 — Generation P as Dima Pugin
- 2014 — Secret of an Idol as Count
- 2016 — The Queen of Spades as Oleg
- 2019 — Icaria as Kazimir
- 2019 — Gold Diggers as Daryus
- 2020 — Wolf as Nahum Eitingon
- 2022 — Monastery as Peter
