= Sergey Sosnovsky =

Russian actor (1955–2022)

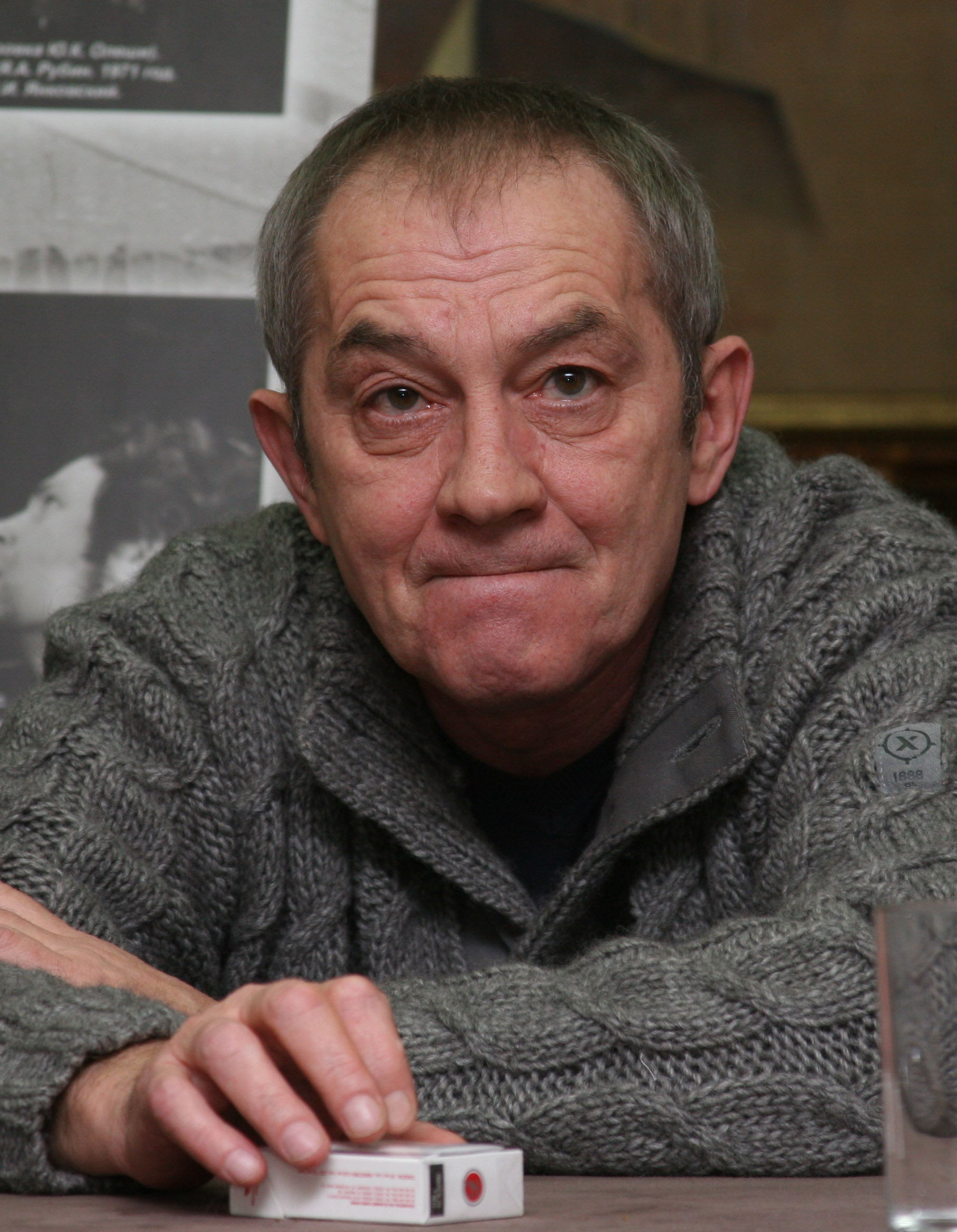
- Born: Sergey Valentinovich Sosnovsky; 1 January 1955; Mokrusha, Kansky District, Russian SFSR, Soviet Union
- Died: 3 July 2022 (aged 67); Moscow, Russia
- Occupation: Actor

Sergey Valentinovich Sosnovsky (Russian: Серге́й Валенти́нович Сосно́вский; 1 January 1955 – 3 July 2022) was a Soviet and Russian actor. Awarded a People's Artist of Russia (2004), he appeared in 100 films.

== Biography ==
Sergey was born on 1 January 1955. He studied at the Slonov's Saratov Theater School and worked at the Saratov Academic Theater for Young Spectators and the Saratov Academic Drama Theater, after which he was accepted into the troupe of the Moscow Art Theater. He died on 3 July 2022, at the age of 67.

== Selected filmography ==
Year	Title	Role	Notes
2006	Piranha	chemist	
2008	Yuri's Day	Sergeev	
2009	Wedding Ring	Alexey Ivanovich Zotov	TV series
2009	Tambourine, Drum	Katya's father	
2010	To Live	an old alcoholic	
2011	My Dad Baryshnikov	Semyon Petrovych	
2013	Metro	Petrunin	
2014	Kitchen	old man Kirill	TV series
2017	Trotsky	David Bronstein	TV series
2018	The Factory	Kazak	
2018	Better than Us	Losev	
2019	How I Became Russian	Fyodor	
2020	One Breath	Valery	
2020	Doctor Lisa	Georgy Flatovsky	
