= The Age of Pioneers =

2017 film directed by Dmitry Kiselyov

Age of Pioneers
- Directed by: Dmitry Kiselyov
- Screenplay by: Yuri Korotkov; Irina Pivovarova; Sergei Kaluzhanov; Dmitry Pinchukov; Oleg Pogodin
- Produced by: Timur Bekmambetov; Yevgeny Mironov
- Starring: Yevgeny Mironov; Konstantin Khabensky; Vladimir Ilyin; Anatoliy Kotenyov; Aleksandra Ursulyak; Yelena Panova; Aleksandr Ilyin; Avangard Leontiev; Kirill Polukhin; Valery Grishko
- Music by: Yuri Poteyenko
- Production companies: Bazelevs, ROME №3 STUDIO
- Release date: April 6, 2017 (Russia)
- Running time: 140 minutes
- Country: Russia
- Language: Russian
- Budget: RUB 400 million
- Box office: RUB 561 million

The Age of Pioneers (Russian: Время первых, romanized: Vremya Pervykh, lit. "Time of the first ones"), also known as Spacewalk or The Spacewalker, is a Russian historical drama film about cosmonaut Alexei Leonov, the first human to perform a spacewalk. Leonov himself served as a consultant for the film. The Age of Pioneers was directed by Dmitry Kiselyov and co-produced by Timur Bekmambetov and Yevgeny Mironov, the latter also starred in the leading role.

The Age of Pioneers was released on April 6, 2017, to widespread critical praise in Russia. The movie grossed RUB 561 million in Russia against a 400 million budget, and is considered a box-office bomb.

== Plot ==
The film is set in the 1960s, during the Cold War and the Space Race between Soviet Union and the United States. The Soviets plan to send a man into space. During the construction of the craft, a technician is killed and the engineers question the safety of the craft. The Kosmos 57 test vehicle, representing the Voskhod 2 spacecraft, breaks up in flight two weeks before the planned launch and Soviet engineers cannot identify the causes of the explosion and sudden loss of communication. Ex-WW2 pilot Pavel Belyayev and military test pilot Alexei Leonov are called to man the craft, but during a skydive Pavel injures his leg landing and is considered unfit. He is replaced by a new, young, and inexperienced cosmonaut (Yevgeny Khrunov), much to Alexei's dismay. Fueled by anger and determination, Pavel recovers through training and eventually is re-admitted, delighting Alexei.

The Voskhod 2 launches, and Alexei makes a spacewalk. It is initially successful and the country celebrates, but Alexei's suit over-inflates, rendering him clumsy and unable to enter the airlock. The ship loses communication with ground control when it enters a dead zone. Alexei defies standing procedure and enters the airlock head first but the outer hatch fails to fully close automatically. He semi deflates his suit and turns within the airlock in order to close the hatch but, as a result, his oxygen runs out and he passes out. Pavel drags him into the pod and succeeds in reviving him. The two are instructed to orbit for 22 hours until Cycle 4 when an automatic system will land them. Pavel detaches the craft from the airlock, causing the Voskhod 2 to spin. Before Cycle 4, Pavel and Alexei feel queasy and find that the oxygen pressure is rising dangerously. Ground control states that the system detected a minor leak and began pumping pure oxygen in response. They are told to find and disconnect a yellow wire in the ceiling to disable it.

Pavel passes out from oxygen toxicity, and Alexei takes control, reaching for the wire. The oxygen causes Alexei to hallucinate about his times as a young boy, running in a field, searching for a bird nest. He manages to twist the wire but passes out before it is disconnected. During his hallucination, he remembers reaching out to the bird who injured him, which causes him to flinch and disconnect the wire.

The cosmonauts awake to find that Cycle 4 failed to run on schedule and ground control conclude that the spin of the craft may be to blame. The cosmonauts are permitted to use manual mode to re-direct the ship in order to ensure that it lands within the Soviet Union. After Pavel stabilizes the craft, it re-enters the atmosphere and lands in the Ural mountains, far from the expected landing site. Planes are despatched to find them, but their radio signals are not picked up. A radio fan on Sakhalin picks up their signals and eventually notifies the Space Agency of their approximate position. A nearby rescue helicopter is ordered to search for them but cannot find them. The helicopter, running out of fuel, is recalled but, with the cosmonauts close to death, the crew spot Alexei's flare.

The cosmonauts arrive by plane at the Agency to meet with their wives and children. Later they parade through Moscow where huge crowds cheer them.

== Cast ==
- Yevgeny Mironov as Alexei Leonov (the cosmonaut)
- Konstantin Khabensky as Pavel Belyayev (the commander of the ship)
- Vladimir Ilyin as Sergei Korolev (general designer)
- Anatoliy Kotenyov as Nikolai Kamanin (lieutenant-general)
- Alexandra Ursuliak as Svetlana Leonova
- Yelena Panova as Tatiana Belyayeva
- Aleksey Morozov as Gherman Titov (the cosmonaut)
- Yuri Itskov as Boris Chertok (designer)
- Vladimir Malyugin as Valery Bykovsky (cosmonaut)
- Aleksandr Novin as Yevgeny Khrunov (cosmonaut)
- Yuri Nifontov as Boris Rauschenbach (mechanical physicist)
- Aleksandr Ilyin as Vladimir Markelov (helicopter pilot)
- Gennady Smirnov as Konstantin Feoktistov (cosmonaut)
- Avangard Leontiev as Yuri Levitan (radio announcer)
- Kirill Polukhin as unit commander
- Valery Grishko as Leonid Brezhnev (Soviet Union leader)

== Filming ==
Initially it was planned that the director of the film would be Sergei Bodrov and that the film would be released in the spring of 2016.

In 2015, the project received financial assistance from the Cinema Foundation of Russia on a non-returnable and refundable basis, Alfa-Bank also provided financial assistance. Filming took place in two stages: from July 1, they filmed in pavilions and the summer outdoor scenery, in November – shooting of space and landing of cosmonauts in the taiga.

Two-thirds of the film were directed by Yuri Bykov, but he was fired from the project by producers Timur Bekmambetov and Yevgeny Mironov. After this, Dmitry Kiselev continued work on the film. Alexei Leonov himself became consultant of the picture.

Visual effects were made by CGF, Russia's largest visual effects studio. CGF worked on more than 1,200 computer graphics shots of varying complexity.

Principal photography finished at the end of 2016.

== Reception ==
=== Box office ===
The Age of Pioneers grossed RUB 145 million in its first weekend, below early expectations. It was attributed to unsuccessful marketing campaign. However, movie's second weekend drop was very small – less than 15%, as it grossed additional RUB 124 million due to good word of mouth. By the end of its theatrical run, The Age of Pioneers grossed in Russia RUB 561 million against a 400 million budget, which is below the two-budget watershed required for a movie to break-even or generate profit.

=== Critical reception ===
The movie received critical acclaim in Russian media. According to review aggregators Megacritic and Kritikanstvo, it received no negative reviews and has an average rating of 7.5/10. Most Russian media, such as Argumenty i Fakty, Film.ru, Rossiyskaya Gazeta, InterMedia, Kommersant, The Hollywood Reporter, and Nezavisimaya Gazeta, among others, praised the movie's acting, directing, special effects and patriotism, while Time Out and Novaya Gazeta, among some others, only gave it mediocre ratings. Many reviews compared the movie to Apollo 13.

== See also ==
- First Man, a 2018 biopic docudrama film about Neil Armstrong's NASA career
- Apollo 13, a 1995 docudrama film about the 1970 Apollo 13 crisis
- The Right Stuff, a 1983 docudrama film about the U.S. side of the Cold War Space Race
- The Red Stuff, a documentary about the Soviet space program.
- Salyut 7, a 2017 docudrama film about the 1985 rescue of Soviet space station Salyut 7
