= The Factory (2018 film) =

2018 film directed by Yuri Bykov

- Russian theatrical release poster
- Directed by: Yuri Bykov
- Written by: Yuri Bykov
- Produced by: Yuri Bykov; Charles-Evrard Tchekhoff; Eduard Iloyan
- Starring: Denis Shvedov; Andrey Smolyakov; Vladislav Abashin; Ivan Yankovsky; Aleksandr Bukharov
- Cinematography: Vladimir Ushakov
- Edited by: Anna Krutiy
- Music by: Aleksey Zubarev
- Production companies: KinoVista; Forever Films Media; Yellow, Black and White; Start
- Distributed by: Central Partnership
- Release date: September 8, 2018 (TIFF)
- Running time: 109 min.
- Countries: Russia; France
- Language: Russian

The Factory (Russian: Завод, romanized: Zavod) is a 2018 crime thriller film directed and written by Yuri Bykov. It stars Denis Shvedov and Andrey Smolyakov. It screened in the Contemporary World Cinema section at the 2018 Toronto International Film Festival.

== Synopsis ==
The owner of the Kalugin's factory informed the workers that he will be obliged to close it soon as it is not profitable. The boss, a local oligarch called Kalugin was kidnapped from his car by masked and armed persons who demanded for him a big ransom. The money is taken to the workers by the head of the oligarch personal security team. His heavily armed mercenaries arrive at night at the factory where the boss is being held hostage.

Those who barricaded themselves in the workshop are local workers led by a former Special Forces soldier, nicknamed Sedoi. Six months without a salary and the impending bankruptcy of the plant push them to a desperate step.

To pull out their boss, nothing will stop the mercenaries. But unlike them, hard workers have nothing more to lose.

== Cast ==
- Denis Shvedov as Sedoi
- Andrey Smolyakov as Konstantin Kalugin
- Vladislav Abashin as Tuman
- Ivan Yankovsky as Vladimir
- Aleksandr Bukharov as Terekhov
- Dmitri Kulichkov as Ryaboi
- Kirill Polukhin as Andreich
- Yury Tarasov as Vesyolyiy
- Aleksey Komashko as Sedmoy
- Aleksey Faddeev as Ponomar
- Sergey Sosnovsky as Kazak
- Vladislav Kotlyarsky as prosecutor

== Production ==
The filming began in October 2017. The shooting took place at a real factory of reinforced concrete structures in the Sokolniki district (Moscow), the work of the plant was not stopped during the shooting.

== Reception ==
The film received average ratings from film critics.

According to Andrei Konchalovsky, Bykov everything goes into the plot, instead of doing the main thing, the meaning of life.
