= Raid (TV series) =

- Налёт
- Genre: crime drama
- Created by: Olivier Marchal
- Written by: Olivier Marchal; Karen Oganesyan
- Directed by: Karen Oganesyan
- Starring: Vladimir Mashkov; Aleksandr Pal; Denis Shvedov; Andrey Smolyakov; Lukerya Ilyashenko; Andrey Tashkov
- Composer: Aleksey Chintsov
- Country of origin: Russia
- Original language: Russian
- No. of seasons: 2
- No. of episodes: 16

Production
- Producers: Polina Ivanova; Arkady Danilov; Karen Oganesyan
- Production location: Kaliningrad
- Cinematography: Vasily Grigolyunas
- Editor: Ilya Evdokimov
- Running time: 52 minutes
- Production company: Cargo Film

Original release
- Network: C1R
- Release: 10 April 2017 – 13 May 2021

Raid (Russian: Налёт, romanized: Nalyot) is a Russian crime drama television series created by Olivier Marchal. It was produced by Cargo Film with the participation of Channel One Russia. It is a Russian adaptation of the French series Braquo. The series was first broadcast in Russia from April 2017.

== Plot ==
The protagonists are four police agents in the Kaliningrad area of Kaliningrad Oblast: Oleg Caplan (Vladimir Mashkov), Pavel Karpenko (Denis Shvedov), Feodor Vachevsky (Aleksandr Pal) and Oxana Golikova (Lukerya Ilyashenko). Their colleague Andrey Ryzhov (Andrey Smolyakov) is accused of criminal misconduct, and commits suicide in the prison. His guilt is then presumed, disrupting the lives of the other four.

The four police agents then decide to "cross the red line": do whatever is necessary, even breaking the law, to clear Ryzhov's name. In crossing the red line, however, they fall under the close scrutiny of Borodin, of the police internal affairs bureau, a sworn enemy to Caplan.

== Cast ==
- Vladimir Mashkovas Oleg Caplan
- Aleksandr Pal as Feodor Vachevsky
- Denis Shvedov as Pavel Karpenko
- Andrey Smolyakov as Andrey Ryzhov
- Lukerya Ilyashenko as Oxana Golikova
- Sergey Shnyrev as Anton Drozdov
- Tamara Saksina as Olga Bagrova
- Andrey Tashkov as Borodin
- Gleb Podgorodinsky as Sotnikov
- Aleksandr Galibin as Kiselev
- Sergey Ugryumov as Zatsepin
- Oleg Almazov as Svechin
- Pavel Chinaryov as Marik
- Iris Ivanova as Nina

== Production ==
The series was shot in Kaliningrad.

== See also ==
- Braquo
- List of Russian television series
