= Guard (2019 film) =

- Film poster
- Russian: Сторож
- Directed by: Yuri Bykov
- Written by: Yuri Bykov
- Produced by: Andrey Novikov; Aleksandr Kotelevskiy; Olga Filipuk; Igor Yesin
- Starring: Yuri Bykov; Vladislav Abashin; Alla Yuganova; Oleg Zima; Gela Meskhi; Artur Beschastny; Aleksandr Kuzmin
- Cinematography: Vladimir Ushakov
- Edited by: Anna Krutiy
- Music by: Yuri Bykov; Ivan Isyanov
- Production company: Invada Film
- Release date: October 24, 2019
- Running time: 106 minutes
- Country: Russia
- Language: Russian
- Budget: ₽55,000,000
- Box office: ₽6 million $109,723

Guard (Russian: Сторож, romanized: Storozh) is a 2019 Russian thriller drama film directed by and starring Yuri Bykov. The film was released in Russia on October 24, 2019.

== Plot ==
The regular life of the caretaker of an abandoned sanatorium is disrupted by the arrival of a strange couple who ask to stay in one of the rooms. Stas and Vera (couple) often quarrel and shout at each other; you can understand that they are hiding from someone. In the evening, three men approach the sanatorium and set fire to a wooden arbor. They call the Watchman, pour gasoline over him, and threaten to burn him for everything he once did. Then they leave. Vera brings alcohol from the city and drinks every day. One evening, she tells the watchman that her two-year-old son had recently died s, after which Stas fled from his criminal colleagues and removing money belonging to the whole group from all accounts.

All three of them have something to hide and something to hide from in the snowy wilderness.

== Cast ==
- Yuriy Bykov as Vlad, guard
- Vladislav Abashin as Stas
- Alla Yuganova as Vera
- Oleg Zima as father
- Gela Meskhi as son
- Artur Beschastny as Bogatov
- Aleksandr Kuzmin as Bagor

== Filming ==
The filming was announced in November 2018, and it was initially assumed that the role of the Watchman would be played by Kirill Pirogov.

The film was shot at the Sosnovy Bor sanatorium in Solotcha is an exclave neighborhood within the Sovetsky District of the city of Ryazan.

== Release ==
The film premiered on October 18, 2019 in Moscow. The film was released in wide rental on October 24, 2019. It is noteworthy that at the same time as the premiere in cinemas, the film appeared on the Kinopoisk service, since Yandex.Studio is the co-producer of the film.
