= Evgeniya Kregzhde =

Russian actress

- Евгения Крегжде
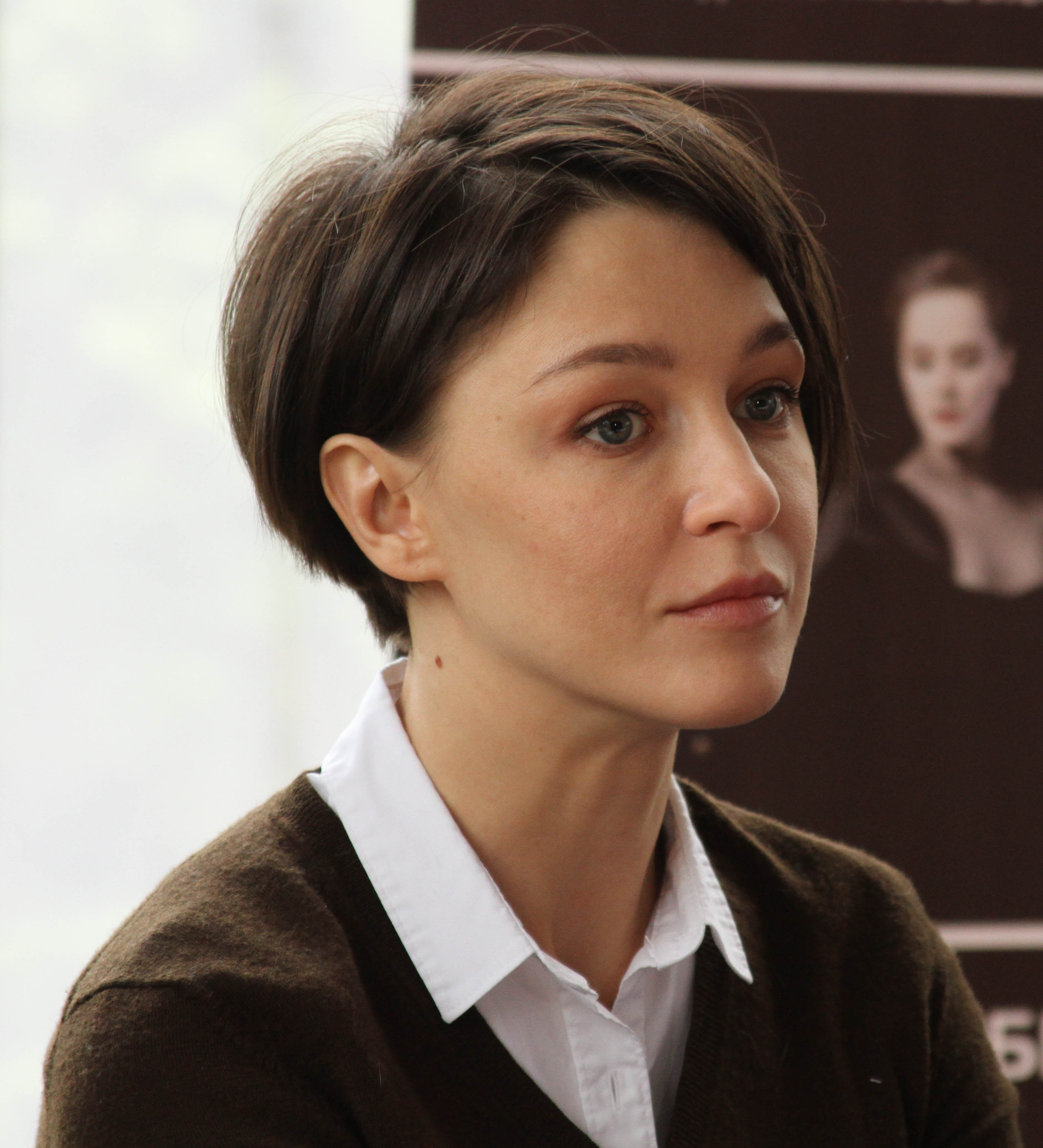
- Born: Evgeniya Vitalyevna Kregzhde; 15 July 1982; Riga, Soviet Union
- Citizenship: Russia
- Occupation: Actress
- Years active: 2005–present
- Awards: Merited Artist of the Russian Federation (2021)

Evgeniya Vitalyevna Kregzhde (Russian: Евгения Витальевна Крегжде; 15 July 1982) is a Russian theater and film actress. Merited Artist of the Russian Federation (2021).

== Biography ==
Evgenia Kregzhde was born on July 15, 1982, in Riga. She is of Russian-Latvian descent. In 2005, she graduated from the Boris Shchukin Theatre Institute (course of M. B. Borisov). In the same year, she was accepted into the Vakhtangov State Academic Theatre.

In the summer of 2009, she was invited by her partners from the sketch show Dayosh Molodyozh! (Give Us Youth!), Mikhail Bashkatov and Andrey Burkovsky, to participate in the KVN festival "Golosyashchy KiViN 2009" as part of the "Maximum" team. Playing the role of Burkovsky's mistress, Evgenia Kregzhde, along with the Tomsk team, won the festival's second prize — the "Big KiViN in Light."

In 2016, paired with figure skater Povilas Vanagas, she participated in the Channel One show Ice Age-6. They took second place in the project.

== Awards ==
- 2016 — Crystal Turandot Theatre Award for "Best Actress" for the role of Katerina in the play The Storm (directed by Ulanbek Bayaliev).
- 2021 — Merited Artist of the Russian Federation.
