= Nastya Ivleeva =

Russian TV presenter (born 1991)

- Настя Ивлеева
- Born: Anastasia Vyacheslavovna Ivleeva; 8 March 1991 (age 35); Razmetelevo, Russian SFSR, Soviet Union
- Occupations: TV presenter; actress; video blogger
- Years active: 2013–present

Anastasia Vyacheslavovna Ivleeva (Russian: Анастасия Вячеславовна Ивлеева; born 8 March 1991), better known as Nastya Ivleeva (Настя Ивлеева), is a Russian television presenter, actress and blogger. She also hosted the Ukrainian TV show Oryol i Reshka on the channels Inter and Friday!.

== Biography ==
Ivleeva was born on March 8, 1991, in the village of Razmetelevo, Leningrad Oblast. After finishing school, she entered the Faculty of Advertising and Public Relations at the St Petersburg State University. Back then, she used to work as a manicurist and hostess at entertainment venues. In 2015, Ivleeva moved to Moscow, where she got a job as a car dealership manager and entered Ostankino TV school of television.

In 2013, she started an Instagram blog. Ivleeva's first publications were devoted to sports until later on, she began shooting short humorous videos. As of April 2021, her main account on Instagram (_agentgirl_) counts over 18 million followers, while her second and more personal page (nastyaivleeva) has over 7.1 million followers. On TikTok, Ivleeva's audience amounts to 6.1 million followers. Also, Ivleeva has a YouTube channel with over 4.13 million subscribers. The content includes lifestyle and travel vlogs, AGENTSHOW talk-show premiered in 2018, and Z.B.S. SHOW (abbreviation in Russian for Stars. Grandmas. Bets). launched in the summer of 2020. All video production on the channel is supervised by Ivleeva personally.

She was the sixth-highest Russian earner on Instagram in 2020.

In December 2023, she organized the "Almost Naked Party" that led to extensive criticism from Russian government sources and Russian conservative activists, leading to Ivleeva to issue two apology videos.

== Career ==
=== Television work ===
In the fall of 2016, Nastya Ivleeva, together with blogger Eldar Dzharakhov and the host of This is Horosho web series Stas Davydov became the hosts of the reality show «Можно всё» (Everything is Possible), on the U channel.

In the spring of 2017, Ivleeva was invited to host the Ukrainian TV show, Oryol i Reshka. Perezagruzka (Heads and Tails. Reload) aired in Ukraine on the Inter TV channel, and on the Friday! channel, which is owned by the Gazprom-Media holding in Russia. Her co-host was Ukrainian DJ and showman Anton Ptushkin. According to Ivleeva, it was her popularity on Instagram that paved the way to television. At the end of 2018, the project has reached its culmination, and Nastya Ivleeva announced her retirement from the show.

At the end of September 2017, Ivleeva, together with Ida Galich, hosted the red carpet of the 5th MusicBox-2017 Real Award ceremony.

In 2018, she co-hosted the MUZ-TV Music Awards, taking the role that had long been performed by Lera Kudryavtseva. Ivleeva was also the host of New Radio's Major League award.

In 2019, Ivleeva returned to Oryol i Reshka for a special season called Ivleeva VS Bednyakov, where her co-host was Andrey Bednyakov, Ukrainian actor and TV presenter. In the summer of 2020, she made another come-back as the show's host after 690 thousand comments were left under the TV channel's publication asking to bring Ivleeva back to the project.

In February 2019, the Friday! channel premiered a new sitcom, Tourist Police, starring Nastya Ivleeva. Actors Mikhail Bashkatov, Sergei Pioro and Alexander Lyapin joined her in the cast.

In 2019, Ivleeva received two Russian television industry awards, TEFI. She was recognised in the categories ‘Best host of prime-time entertainment show’ and ‘Best prime-time entertainment talk show. The second award was given for the Agent Show programme (aired on the Friday! channel) which bypassed, among others, Secret for a Million (NTV) and Tonight (Channel One). Agent Show, the television version of the YouTube project, AGENTSHOW, had been broadcast on the Friday! channel since February 2019.

=== Collaborations with brands and media publications ===
Ivleeva has starred in commercials for the telecom operator Beeline and the cosmetics manufacturer MAC. In 2016, she appeared on the cover of Maxim magazine. On August 21, 2018, Russian journalist Yuri Dud released an interview with Nastya Ivleeva on his YouTube channel, vDud.

In September 2018, Nastya Ivleeva covered Cosmopolitan magazine, and in June 2019 — Glamour magazine and in March 2021 - the Russian version of the Playboy magazine.

In the summer of 2019, Ivleeva endorsed the joint commercial campaign of the Russian retailer, Magnit, and American beverage manufacturer, Pepsi. As part of her ambassadorship, Nastya launched the Dance in Pepsi Style challenge on TikTok, which gained 100 million views. In the same year, another collaborative project between PepsiCo and Nastya Ivleeva was launched within the Magnit stores chain, which saw her create limited edition Lay's chips.

In 2020, Nastya Ivleeva appeared in the 33 Questions video, a project by Vogue Russia for their YouTube channel. In the same year, she starred in a commercial of the Russian telecom company, MTS.

During the lockdown implemented after the surge of the COVID-19 pandemic, Ivleeva launched a series of daily live streams on Instagram inviting famous guests as co-hosts. In May 2020, Instagram announced the list of accounts with the highest number of live stream viewers. Nastya Ivleeva appeared on that list, her best statistics having been recorded in April. Also during the lockdown, Ivleeva launched a charity project to support small and medium-sized enterprises. The campaign was named Business will Live. Amidst the pandemic, she donated 1.5 million rubles to the charity foundations providing support to poor and severely ill people, as well as families with children in difficult living conditions. Part of the money was transferred to the Alliance of Doctors trade union, which provides protective gear to healthcare workers.

In March 2021, Ivleeva appeared on the cover of the Russian Playboy magazine. The production and shooting were carried out by her team.

In the spring of 2021, Ivleeva became an apostle for a charity app Help, which was founded by actor Nikita Kukushkin and conducts targeted support for the elderly. In June 2021, Nastya will host MUZ-TV 2021 Music Awards together with journalist Ksenia Sobchak and actor Alexander Revva.

=== Appearances in music videos ===
In 2016, Ivleeva starred in the video for Arseny Borodin's song Rodnaya. In 2017, she appeared in HammAli & Navai's music video for Do you Want Me to Come? and Oleg Miami's If You are with Me. A year later, Ivleeva joined Ida Galich in her video Dima, as well as appeared in Elena Temnikova's Not Fashionable and Dima Bilan's Drunk Love. In May 2018, she covered Allj's single 360°.

== Personal life ==
After moving to Moscow, Ivleeva started dating Arseny Borodin, frontman of the Chelsea band. They had first met each other long before then, in 2011 in St. Petersburg. In October 2017, they broke up.

On June 13, 2018, Ivleeva revealed her new boyfriend, musician Alexey Konstantinovich Uzenyuk, better known as Eldzhey (Элджей). In September 2019, news appeared of their marriage. In 2021, they divorced.

== Political views ==
In 2019, Ivleeva received a three-year ban from travelling to Ukraine due to her visit to Crimea in 2017, a territory of Ukraine that has been under Russian occupation since 2014. She later signed an open letter condemning the Russian invasion of Ukraine in 2022.

On 25 April 2024, a Moscow court imposed a 50,000-ruble ($560) fine on her, saying her social media posts calling for peace "discredited the military".

In May, Ivleeva celebrated her 33rd birthday in the occupied Donbas region. Additionally, the blogger stated that she felt respect and admiration for Russian president Vladimir Putin; Ivleeva emphasized that she had always liked the Russian leader and never had moments of anger or resentment toward him.

== List of releases ==
=== AgentShow ===
List of AgentShow releases
AgentShow	No.	guest actors	date
AgentShow	1	Regina Todorenko	25.07.2018
AgentShow	2	Natalia Rudova and Marina Minogarova	01.08.2018
AgentShow	3	Dima Bilan	08.08.2018
AgentShow	4	Anton Ptushkin	15.08.2018
AgentShow	5	Pavel and Maria Pogrebnyak	22.08.2018
AgentShow	6	Ekaterina Varnava	29.08.2018
AgentShow	7	Ida Galich and Alan Basiev	05.09.2018
AgentShow	8	Aleksandr Revva	10.10.2018
AgentShow	9	T-killah and Maria Belova	18.10.2018
AgentShow	10	Olga Seryabkina	24.10.2018
AgentShow	11	Eldar Jarrahov	31.10.2018
AgentShow	12	Lilia Abramova (Tatarka FM) и Andrey Borisov (Gan_13_)	07.11.2018
AgentShow	13	Sergey Lazarev	14.11.2018
AgentShow	14	Trio «Иванов, Смирнов, Соболев»	21.11.2018
AgentShow 2.0
AgentShow 2.0	1	Feduk	13.03.2019
AgentShow 2.0	2	Sasha Gudkov	20.03.2019
AgentShow 2.0	3	Big Russian Boss	27.03.2019
AgentShow 2.0	4	HammAli & Navai	03.04.2019
AgentShow 2.0	5	Andriy Bednyakov	10.04.2019
AgentShow 2.0	6	Maxim Galkin	17.04.2019
AgentShow 2.0	7	Мальбэк & Сюзанна	24.04.2019
AgentShow 2.0	8	Mihail Litvin	01.05.2019
AgentShow 2.0	9	Yuri Muzychenko	08.05.2019
AgentShow 2.0	10	Azamat Musagaliev	15.05.2019
AgentShow 2.0	11	Marianna Ro	29.05.2019
AgentShow 2.0	12	«Импровизация» TV show	12.06.2019
AgentShow 2.0	13	Shura	19.06.2019
AgentShow 2.0	14	Lyubov Uspenskaya	26.06.2019
AgentShow 2.0	15	Timur Badrutdinov	03.07.2019
AgentShow 2.0	16	Oleg Gazmanov	10.07.2019
AgentShow 2.0	17	Lolita	25.07.2019
AgentShow Land
AgentShow Land	1	Tima Belorusskih	26.02.2020
AgentShow Land	2	NILETTO	04.03.2020
AgentShow Land	3	Instasamka	11.03.2020
AgentShow Land	4	Elena Temnikova	18.03.2020
AgentShow Land	5	Zivert	25.03.2020
AgentShow Land	5	Migel	01.04.2020

=== Z.B.S. SHOW ===
List of Z.B.S. SHOW releases
Z.B.S. SHOW	No.	guest actors	date
Z.B.S. SHOW	1	Nikolay Baskov	20.07.2020
Z.B.S. SHOW	2	Даня Милохин	19.08.2020
Z.B.S. SHOW	3	Ilya Prusikin (Little Big	26.08.2020
Z.B.S. SHOW	4	Dina Saeva	09.09.2020
Z.B.S. SHOW	5	Dima Maslennikov	24.09.2020
Z.B.S. SHOW	6	АК-47 (band)	15.10.2020
Z.B.S. SHOW	7	Roman Kagramavov	21.10.2020
Z.B.S. SHOW	8	Max +100500	12.11.2020
Z.B.S. SHOW	9	Diskoteka Avariya	18.11.2020
Z.B.S. SHOW	10	Klava Koka	02.12.2020

== Filmography ==
Year	Name of the proekt	Role
2016	Можно ВСЁ!	TV presenter
2017—2020	Oryol i Reshka	TV presenter
2018 — today	Riverdale	Cheryl (voice actor)
2018	Бабушка лёгкого поведения 2. Престарелые мстители	Nastya Ivleeva (News presenter)
2019	Oryol i Reshka. Новый год двух столиц. (special issue)	TV presenter
2019	Tourist Police	Lera
2020	Cyberpunk 2077	Karina Lee (voice actor)
2022	Monastery	Maria

== Awards and nominations ==
=== Awards ===
Year	Award	Сategory	Result
13 November 2017	«Glamour» Magazine Award	Woman of the Year (Makeover of the Year)	Won
12 December 2017	NeForum Awards	The brightest Viner of Instagram	Won
27 February 2018	«Lady Mail.Ru» Award	Best Viner («Истина в вайне»)	Won

=== Ratings ===
Date	Name	Place
2017	Rating «Maxim»: 100 sexy women in Russia 2017	9 place
2018	Rating «Maxim»: 100 sexy women in Russia 2018	3 place
