= Monastery (Russian TV series) =

- Genre: Drama
- Created by: Alexandra Remizova
- Written by: Aleksandr Molochnikov
- Directed by: Aleksandr Molochnikov
- Starring: Filipp Yankovsky; Nastya Ivleeva; Mark Eydelshteyn; Natalya Kudryashova; Maria Mironova; Svetlana Ivanova; Maria Abashova; Dzhanik Faiziev
- Composer: Darya Charusha
- Country of origin: Russia
- Original language: Russian
- No. of seasons: 1
- No. of episodes: 6

Production
- Producers: Alexandra Remizova; Dmitry Nelidov; Olga Filipuk; Mikhail Kitaev; Andrey Reznik
- Production location: Kirillo-Belozersky Historical, Architectural, and Art Museum-Reserve
- Cinematography: Sergey Trofimov
- Editors: Alexander Ivanov; Azamat Yermatov
- Running time: 36–45 minutes
- Production companies: Lunapark; Plus Studio

Original release
- Network: KinoPoisk
- Release: 19 November 2022 – present

Monastery is a 2022 Russian drama web series directed and written by Aleksandr Molochnikov. The series tells the story of a Moscow party girl, Maria, who hides from criminals in an Orthodox monastery. The main cast includes Filipp Yankovsky, Nastya Ivleeva, and Mark Eydelshteyn. Other actors include Natalya Kudryashova, Maria Mironova, Svetlana Ivanova, Maria Abashova, and Dzhanik Faiziev. The premiere was on 19 November 2022 on the online cinema platform KinoPoisk. Within the first day, the series set a record with over 250,000 viewers.

On 19 September 2024, the series was officially renewed for a second season.

== Plot ==
The story follows party girl Maria (Nastya Ivleeva) as she turns to faith. Due to her actions, the wife of a wealthy businessman, Angelina, becomes involved in a high-profile sexual scandal. Fleeing from Angelina's husband’s pursuers, Maria hides in a female monastery under the supervision of Father Varsonofy (Filipp Yankovsky).

In the second season, Yura (Mark Eydelshteyn) moves to Moscow for studies, and Father Varsonofy faces major changes.

== Cast ==
=== Main roles ===
- Filipp Yankovsky — Varsonofy (Vladimir Shumakov), spiritual father of a male monastery
- Nastya Ivleeva — Maria Dyatlova, a party girl who ends up in a monastery while escaping dangerous people
  - Valeriya Shutovskaya — young Maria
- Mark Eydelshteyn — Yura, novice and grandson of Varsonofy
- Natalya Kudryashova — Elizaveta, abbess of the female monastery, youngest daughter of Varsonofy (from episode 5 — nun of the female monastery)
  - Alyona Malakhova — young Elizaveta
- Maria Mironova — Patrikeia, nun and assistant to Mother Elizaveta (from episode 5 — abbess of the female monastery)
- Svetlana Ivanova — Olga Shumakova, former wife of Varsonofy, mother of Alisa and Liza
- Maria Abashova — Angelina Burkova, wife of Nikolai, Maria's friend
- Dzhanik Faiziev — Nikolai Burkov, influential oligarch, husband of Angelina

=== Supporting roles ===
- Artyom Bystrov — Victor, worker
- Pavel Vorozhtsov — worker
- Leonid Telezhinsky — worker
- Dmitry Guryanov & Sergey Borisov — Nikolai's henchmen pursuing Maria
- Marina Kaletskaya — Panteleymona, novice, Maria's friend
- Yola Sanko — Mother Evdokia
- Anastasia Velikorodnaya — novice Nazaria
- Anna Shevchuk — novice Agafya
- Diana Enakaeva — Alisa, eldest daughter of Varsonofy and Olga, Yura's mother (as a child)

=== Guest roles ===
- Pyotr Rykov — Sergey, fitness trainer of Angelina
- Vladimir Varnava — Sasha, posted intimate video with Maria and Angelina
- David Nyamedi — Dju, surfer, friend of Sasha
- Oleg Gaas — Kirill, Maria's ex-boyfriend
- Valentina Mazunina — parishioner
- Kai Alex Getz — Vitya
- Aleksey Rozin — Vitya's father
- Vasily Bochkarev — elder Mikhail
- Ivan Zlobin — Kolya
- Evgeniya Dobrovolskaya — Kolya's mother, has Tourette syndrome
- Ida Galich — casino visitor
- Artur Smolyaninov — Alexey
- Elena Koreneva — Maria's grandmother
- Igor Mirkurbanov — Peter

== Episodes ==
No.	Title	Directed by	Written by	Original release date
1	"Episode 1"	Aleksandr Molochnikov	Aleksandr Molochnikov	19 November 2022
Young novice Yura prepares to become a monk and faces challenges. Meanwhile, party girl Maria and oligarch's wife Angelina travel to the Emirates for fun. After a night of drugs and sex, an intimate video of them is leaked online, and Maria becomes pursued by Nikolai's henchmen. She hides in a male monastery.

== Release ==
The first two episodes premiered on 19 November 2022 on KinoPoisk. The series set a record on its release day with over 250,000 viewers, surpassing projects like House of the Dragon and Rick and Morty (season 5), among others. It topped KinoPoisk’s top-20 list for 2022.

On 24 November 2022, the Russian Ministry of Culture refused the series a distribution certificate "for offending religious feelings".

== Production ==
Before filming, the script was provided to the Russian Orthodox Church but did not receive support. Vladimir Legoyda said that although the idea had moral elements, the Church could not support it as written.

Scenes depicting Maria and Angelina in the Emirates were filmed in Tunisia due to COVID-19 restrictions. Main filming took place at Ferapontov Monastery and Kirillo-Belozersky Monastery.

== Reception ==
Dmitry Kamyshenko (lifehacker.ru) gave the series a negative review, criticizing music and characters.

Bishop Savva of the Russian Orthodox Church criticized the depiction of believers and the series' inaccuracies.

Milena Faustova of the Nezavisimaya Gazeta wrote that the provocative approach and clichés made the series neither interesting nor aesthetically appealing.

Pola Kulikova of Literaturnaya Gazeta commented on the bright portrayal of debauchery and the constructed moral of the story.
