= Artur Smolyaninov =

Russian actor (born 1983)

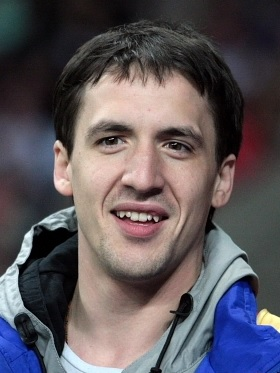
- Born: 27 October 1983 (age 43); Moscow, Soviet Union
- Occupation: Actor
- Years active: 1998–present
- Spouse: Darya Melnikova (m. 2013; div. 2021)
- Children: 2

Artur Sergeyevich Smolyaninov (Russian: Арту́р Серге́евич Смольяни́нов; born 27 October 1983) is a Russian actor.

== Biography ==
Smolyaninov was born on October 27, 1983, in Moscow. His mother Maria Vladimirovna is an art teacher. The godfather of Artur is Ivan Okhlobystin. He spent his childhood and youth in the city of Korolyov, Moscow Region. Artur has two younger brothers and a sister.

Smolyaninov's cinematic debut was at the age of fourteen in the 1998 film Who If Not Us by Valeriy Priemykhov.

After completing external school at the age of 16, he entered the Russian Institute of Theatre Arts at the acting section of the directing department (course of Leonid Heifetz) at the age of 16, and in 2004 graduated from it with almost a dozen credits in films and on television.

After his acting debut in Who If Not Us, he played in the movie Triumph (2000). The role of Lyutyy in the film about the Afghan war The 9th Company (2005) brought wide popularity to the actor.

Artur Smolyaninov was accepted into the troupe of the Sovremennik Theatre in 2006. In his theatrical performances, he played the father in Family Situations by Biljana Srbljanović, Vikhorev in Stay in Your Own Sled by Alexander Ostrovsky.

Afterwards he had the roles of Soleny in the play Three Sisters by Anton Chekhov, the Danish king in Once Again about the Naked King Leonid Filatov, Pompey and Gonets in the play Antony & Cleopatra. Version of Oleg Bogayev and Kirill Serebrennikov based on the works of William Shakespeare, Prince Gialmar in Malen by Maurice Maeterlinck.

Artur Smolyaninov played the main role of ambulance doctor Oleg Samarin in the television series Samara which premiered in 2012 and lasted for two seasons.

Took part in the competitive ice skating show Ice Age in 2014, paired with Olympic champion Tatiana Totmianina.

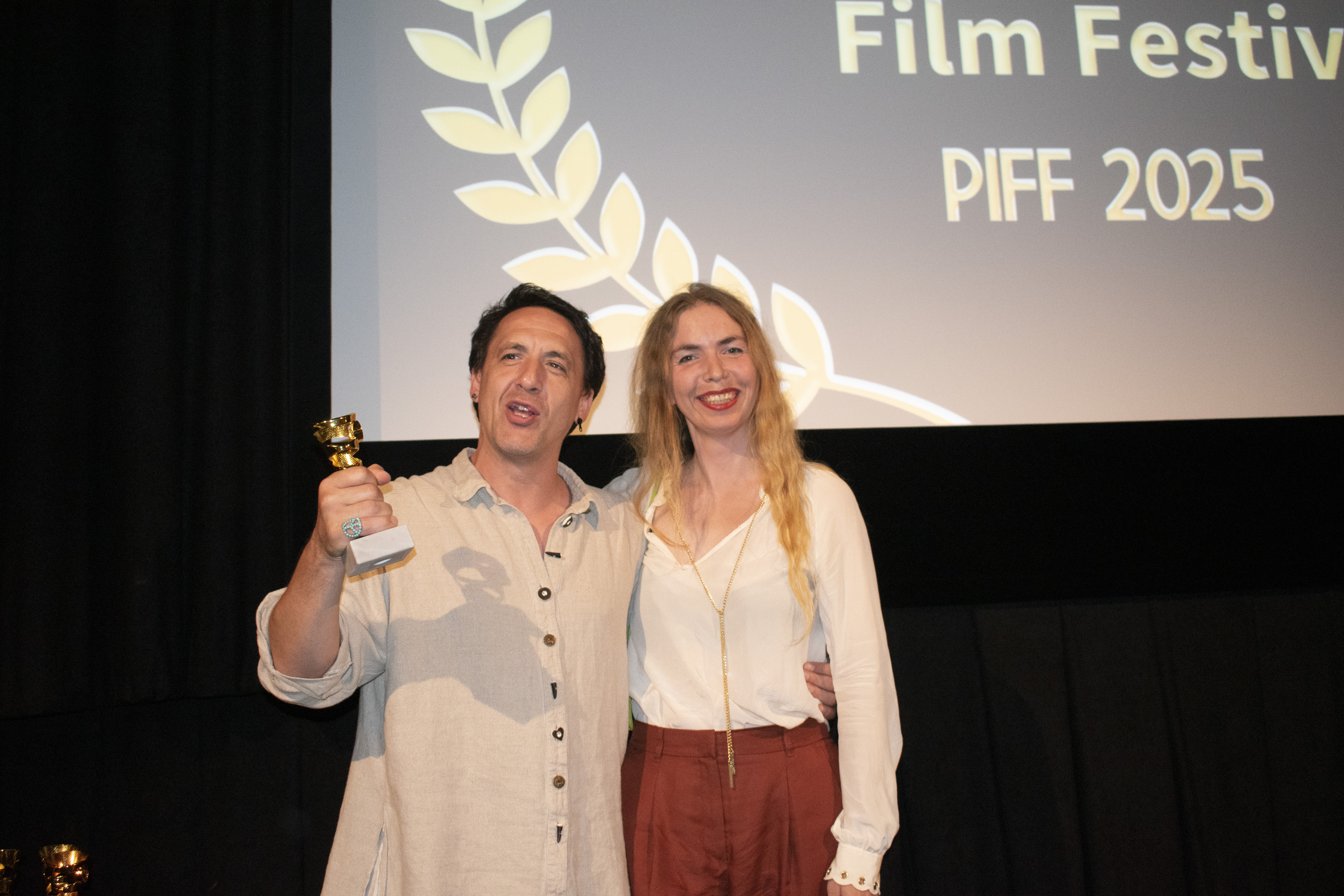
Artur Smolyaninov receiving the Best Actor award at the 2025 Prague Independent Film Festival

Smolyaninov is also a musician and has a band titled cheLovek which he founded after leaving Russia and moving to Riga, Latvia. The band released their first music video in 2024.

Since January 2025, he has been the host of the podcast «Переживём» ("We’ll Survive") on Deutsche Welle.

At the 2025 Prague Independent Film Festival, Artur received the Best Actor Award for his role in the film I Never Said Goodbye by director Yev K'banchik. It is his first role in English language.

In 2025 Smolyaninov appeared in the short film Extremist by Aleksandr Molochnikov.

In 2026, the film Minotaur by Andrey Zvyagintsev starring Smolyaninov, won the Grand Prix at the 79th Cannes Film Festival.

=== Political persecution ===
In October 2022, Smolyaninov was charged for discrediting the Russian armed forces after making statements against the 2022 Russian invasion of Ukraine; he had also fled the country. He commented: "The laws of this state do not exist for me. They, like the state itself, are inherently criminal, which means they have neither moral nor legal force".

In January 2023, Smolyaninov was charged after allegedly making "anti-Russian" comments in an interview with Novaya Gazeta Europe. In the interview, he had stated that he would fight for Ukraine, not Russia, if he was forced to take part in the war. In the same month, Russian Ministry of Justice included Smolyaninov in its "foreign agents". On October 5, Smolyaninov was added to Rosfinmonitoring's list of terrorists and extremists.

In October 2025, the Federal Security Service initiated a criminal case against the actor under Article 278 of the Russian Criminal Code ("Forcible seizure of power or forcible retention of power") and Part 1 and Part 2 of Article 205.4 of the Russian Criminal Code ("Organization of a terrorist community and participation in it").

== Philanthropy ==
Artur Smolyaninov was a member of the Board of Trustees of the Give Life Foundation («Подари жизнь»), organized by Chulpan Khamatova and Dina Korzun, which helps children with oncohematological diseases, and Galchonok, which helps children with organic lesions of the central nervous system. Repeatedly participated in charitable events.

== Personal life ==
In 2013 he married the actress Darya Melnikova, in October 2015 the couple had a son, followed by a second son. On June 6, 2021, Melnikova announced her divorce from Smolyaninov.

Smolyaninov stated in October 2022 that he was no longer living in Russia.

== Awards ==
- 1998 – Best Teen Actor Award at the 8th International Children's Film Festival in Artek – for the role of Tolyasik in the feature film Who If Not Us (1998), directed by Valery Priemykhov.
- 2006 – Winner of the MTV Russia Movie Awards in the Breakthrough of the Year category – for the role of Private (later Junior Sergeant) Oleg Lyutaev ("Lyutyi") in the feature film 9th Company (2005), directed by Fyodor Bondarchuk.
- 2006 – Nominee for the Nika Award in the Best Actor category – for the role of Private (later Junior Sergeant) Oleg Lyutaev ("Lyutyi") in the feature film 9th Company (2005), directed by Fyodor Bondarchuk.
- 2006 – Winner of the Triumph Award (youth non-governmental award for achievements in literature and arts) on December 7, 2006.
- 2025 – Winner of the Prague Independent Film Festival in the Best Actor category for the role of Alex in the film I Never Said Goodbye, directed by Yev K'banchik.

== Theatre ==
=== Acting ===
Sovremennik Theatre

- 2006 — "Naked Pioneer" based on the novel of the same name by Mikhail Kononov (director – Kirill Serebrennikov; premiere – 3 March 2005)
- 2006 — "Once Again About the Naked King" based on the play of the same name by Leonid Filatov (director – Mikhail Efremov, director – Nikita Vysotsky; premiere – 2001) — Danish King
- 2006 — "Antony & Cleopatra. Version" based on the play by Oleg Bogaev and Kirill Serebrennikov, inspired by William Shakespeare's tragedy Antony and Cleopatra (director – Kirill Serebrennikov; premiere – 4 October 2006) — Pompey / Messenger
- 2007 — "Malen" based on the play Princess Malen by Maurice Maeterlinck (director – Vladimir Ageev; premiere – 30 May 2007) — Prince Hjalmar
- 2008 — "Don't You Want to Walk Arm-in-Arm?" 75 minutes of poetry, love, and music (director – Igor Kvasha; premiere – 4 February 2008, dedicated to the 75th anniversary of Igor Kvasha) — Reader
- 2008 — "Three Sisters" based on the play of the same name by Anton Chekhov (director – Galina Volchek; premiere – 26 March 2008) — Vasily Vasilyevich Soleny, Staff Captain
- 2008 — "Hand Organ" based on the play of the same name by Andrey Platonov (director – Mikhail Efremov; premiere – 26 May 2008) — Yevsey, deputy head of the cooperative system in a distant district of Shchoyev
- 2009 — "The Show" based on the play of the same name by Mikhail Pokrass (director – Mikhail Pokrass; the show was part of the "Experiments" project; premiere – 17 January 2009) — Max (Laertes)
- 2009 (until March 2015) — "Murlin Murlo" based on the play of the same name by Nikolai Kolyada (director – Galina Volchek, director – Sergey Garmash; premiere – 26 March 2009; updated version of the play, which had been staged at the theatre from 1990 to 2008) — Mikhail
- 2010 — "Gentleman" based on the 1897 comedy by Alexander Sumbatov-Yuzhin (director – Evgeny Kamenkovich; premiere – 5 February 2010) — Larion Denisovich Rydlov, son of the head of the "Rydlov Widow and Chechkov" trading house, Olga Spiridonovna Rydlova
- 2011 — "Gorbunov and Gorchakov" based on the dramatic poem by Joseph Brodsky (director – Evgeny Kamenkovich, director – Vera Kamyshnikova; premiere – 14 October 2011) — Gorchakov
- 2013 — "Hot Heart" based on the play of the same name by Alexander Ostrovsky (director – Egor Peregudov; premiere – 26 April 2013) — Taras Tarasovich Khlunov, wealthy contractor
- 2014 — "Dedicated to Yalta" based on the poem of the same name by Joseph Brodsky and Cello Sonata No. 1 by Alfred Schnittke (concept – Artur Smolyaninov and Boris Andrianov, director – Artur Smolyaninov; premiere – 2 November 2014) — All male roles
- 2016 — "Don't Leave Your Planet" — a stage fantasy based on the novella The Little Prince by Antoine de Saint-Exupéry (director – Victor Kramer; premiere – 30 March 2016 as part of the "Presenting Friends" project) — All roles (all roles were performed alternately by two actors: at one time by Konstantin Khabensky, at another by Artur Smolyaninov)

=== Directorial Work ===
- 2014 — "Dedicated to Yalta" based on the poem of the same name by Joseph Brodsky and Cello Sonata No. 1 by Alfred Schnittke (concept – Artur Smolyaninov and Boris Andrianov, director – Artur Smolyaninov; premiere – 2 November 2014)

== Filmography ==
=== Film ===
Year	Title	Role
1998	Who If Not Us	Tolyasik
2003	The Suit	Geka
2004	Daddy	Lyonchik
2004	Mars	Gregory
2005	The 9th Company	Oleg Lutaev
2006	Heat	Artur
2006	Last Slaughter	Andryukha
2007	1612	Kostka
2008	He Who Puts Out the Light	Alexander Orlov
2008	Nirvana	Valera
2009	The Book of Masters	Yangul
2009	I Am	I
2010	Burnt by the Sun 2: Exodus	Jurka
2010	Yolki	Aleksey
2011	Burnt by the Sun 2: Citadel	Jurka
2011	Five Brides	Vadim Dobromyslov
2011	The Darkest Hour	Yuri
2011	Ivan Tsarevich and the Gray Wolf	Gray Wolf
2011	Fairytale.Is	Hare
2012	My Boyfriend Is an Angel	Seraphim
2012	Soulless	Avdyei
2012	The White Guard	adjutant Boyko
2013	Break Loose	Buts
2014	Redirected	Doncius
2014	Yolki 1914	Pyotr Kuznetsov
2017	Life Ahead	Grigory Kiselev
2017	Yana+Yanko	Timofey
2020	AK-47	Lyutyy
2021	Mariya. Spasti Moskvu	Father Vladimir
2025	I Never Said Goodbye	Alex

=== TV ===
Year	Title	Role
2011	Samara	Oleg Samarin ("Samara")
2020	Wolf	Nikolay Bezruk
2021	Survivors	Sergey Shadrin
2021	An Hour Before Dawn	Dmitry Kopyrin ("Buyan")
2022	Monastery	Alexey

=== Voice acting ===
==== Films ====
- 2006 – Bumer. Film the Second – The Chinese (Turar Murtaliev)
- 2006 – Rabbit Over the Void – Lautar, Anna's fiancé, violinist (Vartan Darakchyan)
- 2010 – No Problem – Slavik (Grigory Gandlevskiy)
- 2017 – Podval

==== Animated Films ====
- 2011 – Ivan Tsarevich and the Grey Wolf – Grey Wolf
- 2014 – Alisa Knows What to Do! – Generalissimo Chapad, Laboratory Assistant Ipad

==== Dubbing ====
- 2017 – The Son of Bigfoot – Bigfoot

=== Music videos ===
- 2006 – Song "Под запретом" by the band Non Stop
- 2016 – Song "Обычный человек" (album "Дивный новый мир") by the rock band Louna
- 2018 – Song "Грустные люди" by the rock band Nochnye Snaipery
- 2022 – Song "С Новым годом, сынок" by the rock band Nogu Svelo!
- 2024 – Song "Elsinore" by the band CheLovek

=== Music ===
The first lineup of the band, formed in Saint Petersburg in 2020, was called "Смола" (Smola). After Artur Smolyaninov's emigration to Latvia, a new lineup was formed under the name "cheLovek" (guitarist Yanis Rungis, bassist Stanislav Yudin, keyboardist Evalds Lazarovich, and drummer Krishjanis Bremshs).

== See also ==
- Protests against the Russian invasion of Ukraine
