= Anastasiya Krasovskaya =

Belarusian model and actress

- Анастасия Красовская
- Born: Anastasiya Olegovna Krasovskaya; January 2, 1999 (age 27); Minsk, Belarus
- Occupations: Model; Actress
- Years active: 2021–present
- Awards: Best Actress Award (Locarno International Film Festival) (2021)

Anastasiya Olegovna Krasovskaya (Russian: Анастасия Олеговна Красовская, Belarusian: Анастасія Алегаўна Красоўская; born 1999) is a Belarusian model and actress active in Russia. She is best known for her leading role in the film by Natalya Kudryashova Gerda (2021).

== Biography ==
Krasovskaya was born on 2 January 1999, in Minsk, where she spent her youth. She studied to be an international lawyer and has no professional acting education. Since 2017, she has worked in the modeling business. She lived in China.

== Selected filmography ==
List of film credits
Year	Title	Role	Notes
2021	Gerda	Lera	Won Best Actress Award
2023	The White List	Litovchenko	
2023	The Boy's Word: Blood on the Asphalt	Irina Sergeevna	TV Series
2024	A Killer's Mind	Nika Savelyeva	TV Series
2025	Gandi molchal po subbotam	Kris	

Music video

- Tima Belorusskih: Vitaminka (2019)

== Awards ==
- 74th Locarno Film Festival: Best Actress
