= Odessa Rae =

Canadian film producer

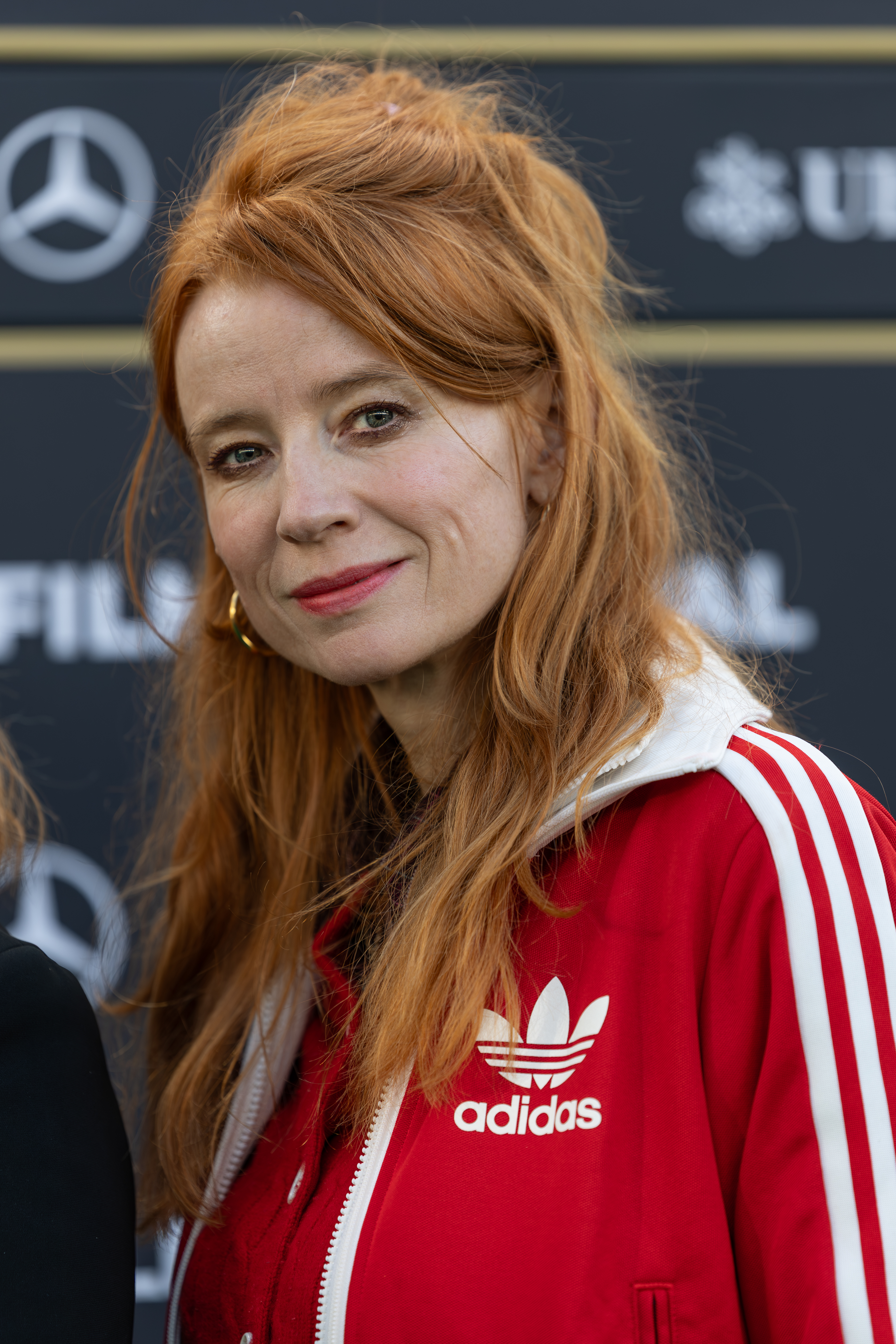
- Rae in 2025
- Born: Calgary, Canada
- Education: University of Toronto
- Occupations: Film producer, actor

Odessa Rae is a Canadian producer and actor, best known for producing the documentary Navalny (2022), directed by Daniel Roher, which won the Best Documentary Feature at the 95th Academy Awards and Best Documentary at the 76th British Academy Film Awards.

She was key in the formation of Ivanhoe Pictures, which produced Crazy Rich Asians. Her 2025 produced film, The Voice of Hind Rajab, directed by Kaouther Ben Hania, premiered in the main competition of the 82nd Venice International Film Festival.

== Early life ==
Rae's early life was spent between North America, Asia and India. She studied international relations at the University of Toronto, is fluent in Japanese and conversationally fluent in several other languages.

== Career ==
She began her film career in Japan. Widely known through appearances in commercials with Brad Pitt, From there she went on to co-write, produce and star in her first feature film, Jenifa.. As an actor, Rae has appeared in numerous feature films and television series, including Hard Candy, Smallville, and Movie 43.

She was key in the formation of Ivanhoe Pictures, which produced the box office hit Crazy Rich Asians. In January 2017, Rae signed a first-look development deal with the company.

In 2021, Rae launched RaeFilm Studios, focusing on the development and production of non-fiction content.

In 2022, she produced Navalny (2022), directed by Daniel Roher, which won the Best Documentary Feature at the 95th Academy Awards and Best Documentary at the 76th British Academy Film Awards.

In 2023, she served as a producer for Hollywoodgate, directed by Ibrahim Nash'at, which had its world premiere at the 80th Venice International Film Festival. That same year, she also produced Defiant by Karim Amer, which had its world premiere at the 2023 Toronto International Film Festival. In 2024, she produced It Doesn't Matter by Josh Mond, which screened at the 2024 Cannes Film Festival in the ACID section. In 2025, Rae produced The Voice of Hind Rajab by Kaouther Ben Hania, which entered the main competition at the 82nd Venice International Film Festival. She also served as an executive producer on the short film Extremist directed by Aleksandr Molochnikov.

Odessa has received multiple honors including the Producers Guild of America Award, DuPont Columbia, Greirson Award, Cinema Eye, Critics Choice Awards In addition the Audience Award in the US Documentary competition and the Festival Favorite Award at Sundance Film Festival. She is the recipient of the 2023 UN Sustainable Goals Impact Through Film Award.

== Filmography ==
=== Producer ===
| Year | Title | Director |
|---|---|---|
| 2022 | Navalny | Daniel Roher |
| 2022 | The Story Won't Die | David Henry Gerson |
| 2023 | Hollywoodgate | Ibrahim Nash’at |
| 2023 | Defiant | Karim Amer |
| 2024 | It Doesn't Matter | Josh Mond |
| 2025 | The Voice of Hind Rajab | Kaouther Ben Hania |
| 2026 | Falling House | Mohsen Gharaei |

=== Executive producer ===
| Year | Title | Director |
|---|---|---|
| 2016 | Of Dust and Bones | Diane Bell |
| 2025 | Palace of Youth | Maddie Gwinn |
| 2025 | Extremist | Aleksandr Molochnikov |
| 2026 | Hell's Army | Richard Rowley |
| 2026 | A Bit of Light | Ali Asgari |

=== Actor ===
| Year | Title | Role | Notes |
|---|---|---|---|
| 2024 | Chosen Family | Frances | |
| 2018 | Half Magic | Roxy | |
| 2017 | Hangman | TV Reporter | |
| 2015 | Always Worthy | TV Reporter | |
| 2014 | Asthma | Bathing Wings | |
| 2013 | Movie 43 | Danita | |
| 2012 | The Visit | Diana Short | |
| 2012 | Gabe the Cupid Dog | Carissa | |
| 2012 | Rizzoli & Isles | Yoga Instructor | TV series |
| 2011 | Man Without a Head | Venula | |
| 2011 | My Dog's Christmas Miracle | Crystal | |
| 2010 | Rules of Engagement | Gretchen | TV series |
| 2010 | Smallville | Maggie McDougal/Silver Banshee | TV series |
| 2010 | Leverage | Cora McRory | TV series |
| 2010 | Let the Game Begin | Patient Patient | TV series |
