= Us, Our Pets and the War =

2024 documentary film

- Film poster
- Directed by: Anton Ptushkin
- Written by: Anton Ptushkin
- Narrated by: Anton Ptushkin
- Production companies: Ukraine Vse Sam; Canada Yap Films
- Distributed by: Ukraine Green Light Films
- Release date: 4 April 2024
- Running time: 85 minutes
- Countries: Ukraine; Canada
- Languages: Ukrainian; Russian
- Box office: 4,550,931 UAH

Us, Our Pets and the War (Russian: «Мы, наши любимцы и война», romanized: My, nashi lyubimtsy I voina, Ukrainian: «Ми, наші улюбленці та війна», romanized: My, nashi uliublentsi ta viyna) is a 2024 documentary film directed by Anton Ptushkin and co-produced by the Ukrainian company Vse Sam and the Canadian company Yap Films. The documentary tells the story of the relationship between people and their animals against the backdrop of the full-scale Russian invasion of Ukraine. The film is the directorial debut of blogger Anton Ptushkin, who worked on it for 1.5 years.

The Ukrainian premiere will take place on 4 April 2024, with Green Light Films as a distributor.

PBS, the US largest broadcaster, has acquired Anton Ptushkin's film.The international version of the film Us, Our Pets and the War will be shown in the USA as part of the popular PBS documentary project "Nature". It is noteworthy that PBS broadcast the 2024 Oscar-winning film "20 Days in Mariupol" in the Frontline series.

== Synopsis ==
Us, Our Pets and the War highlights the stories of people and their pets during the 2022 Russian invasion of Ukraine. Russia's armed aggression resulted in many people forced to leave their homes for places outside the war zone. Fleeing the war, people also saved the lives of animals: cats, dogs, bears, lions, chameleons, lemurs, etc., as well as famous pets such as Patron the dog and Shafa the cat. Besides Ukrainians, the film includes citizens of other countries who also took part in the rescue mission.

The main idea of the film boils down to a quote from Asia Serpinska, the founder of the Hostomel shelter: "Save animals to stay human".

This film is an attempt to show the events in Ukraine from a different angle, namely through the relationship between people and animals affected by the war.

"This film was originally made with the Western audience in mind because it seemed to me that everyone in Ukraine already knew everything. But then I realized that a lot of what I filmed would be interesting and understandable to Ukrainians too. That's how I came up with the idea to make a separate movie for our audience and show it in Ukrainian cinemas, not on YouTube. I'm curious to see how it will turn out," Anton Ptushkin comments.

== Release ==
Us, Our Pets and the War will open the annual Doc Kyiv Fest international documentary film festival on 28–30 March 2024 and be available in Ukrainian cinemas starting from 4 April 2024. Green Light Films, a film distribution company, will be responsible for the Ukrainian distribution. Its goal is literally to give the green light to the positive changes in the industry.
