= Viktoria Miroshnichenko =

Russian actress (born 1994)

- Born: 17 May 1994 (age 32); Irkutsk, Russia
- Occupation: actress
- Years active: 2019 – present

Viktoria Alekseevna Miroshnichenko (born 17 May 1994 in Irkutsk) is a Russian actress known for her roles in cinema and theater. She is best known for her roles as Iya in Beanpole and as Elena in Limonov: The Ballad. She was nominated for the European Film Awards for Best Actress.

== Biography ==
Viktoria was born on 17 May 1994 in Irkutsk. As a child, she was involved in dance and drawing. In high school, she attended a club at the technical university. Initially, she considered several professions, including architecture, but eventually chose acting.

Her debut role in cinema was as the front-line nurse Iya Sergeyevna in Beanpole, which brought Miroshnichenko popularity and critical acclaim, along with awards and nominations.

In 2019, she graduated from the acting department of GITIS (under the guidance of Evgeny Kamienkovich and Dmitry Krymov).

In 2024 she appeared in the film Limonov: The Ballad by Kirill Serebrennikov.

In 2025 Miroshnichenko played the lead role in the short film Extremist by Aleksandr Molochnikov.

== Filmography ==
- 2019 — Beanpole — Iya Sergeyevna
- 2022 — A Fairy Tale for the Old — Muli's girlfriend
- 2023 — The White List — Solovyova
- 2023 — Limonov: The Ballad — Elena Shapova
- 2025 — Extremist — artist

== Awards ==
- Golden Eagle — Best Actress in a Film
- Lisbon & Estoril International Film Festival — Special Jury Prize for Artistic Contribution (shared with Vasilisa Perelygina)
- IX Sakhalin International Film Festival "Edge of the World" — Best Actress (shared with Vasilisa Perelygina)
- Turin International Film Festival — Best Actress (shared with Vasilisa Perelygina)
- Nika Award — Best Actress for Beanpole
