= Samara (TV series) =

- Genre: Melodrama
- Written by: Irakli Abzianidze
- Directed by: Stanislav Dremov
- Starring: Artur Smolyaninov, Leonid Gromov, Polina Filonenko, Evgeniya Dobrovolskaya, Vladimir Simonov, Yuri Baturin, Yola Sanko, Evelina Bledans, Olga Arntgolts
- Country of origin: Russia
- Original language: Russian
- No. of episodes: 14

Production
- Executive producers: Evgeniya Tsitsina, Lilia Gainanova
- Producers: Yu. Sapronov, A. Smirnov, Dmitry Meskhiev
- Cinematography: Roman Boyko
- Running time: ~45 minutes per episode

Original release
- Network: Russia-1
- Release: August 2011 – December 2011

Samara (Russian: Самара) is a 14-episode Russian melodramatic television series, broadcast on the Russia-1 channel. The series revolves around the life of emergency medical personnel and stars Russian actor Artur Smolyaninov in the lead role of Oleg Samarin, a paramedic.

== Plot ==
The series follows Oleg Samarin, a paramedic known by the nickname "Samara," who stands out among his colleagues for his unorthodox approach to work. Unlike his peers, Samarin is outspoken, often joking with hospital staff and patients, and willing to break established rules. Despite this, he is far from being irresponsible or rude, and is depicted as a highly skilled and empathetic doctor.

Samarin is a talented surgeon who always strives to do his job with conscience, guided more by his personal principles than by rigid protocols. He leads a team of medical professionals that includes paramedic Lena (played by Polina Filonenko) and driver Mikhailych (played by Leonid Gromov), as they navigate daily emergencies and challenges. Each incident they encounter is a unique story, deeply affecting both the patients and the medical team. However, the team members each harbor their own secrets, with Samara struggling to fully open up to his colleagues. As the series progresses, these secrets slowly come to light.

== Production ==
The series was filmed not in the city of Samara, as the title suggests, but in Moscow and the Moscow region. Smolyaninov, who had always dreamed of playing a doctor, felt this role was important; he explained, "I have great respect for doctors; my grandfather, was a doctor

Smolyaninov spent considerable time preparing for his role, immersing himself in the professional atmosphere of emergency medicine. He spent a full day observing ambulance teams at work and even completed a "hands-on" internship in a hospital's intensive care unit. Throughout filming, medical consultants, including doctors and paramedics, were available on set to ensure the accuracy of the portrayal.

Leonid Gromov, who plays Mikhailych, the driver, reunites with Filonenko after previously playing her father in the film Gromozeka.

In order to ensure the authenticity of the show's portrayal of medical work, a replica of an ambulance was constructed at the RWS-Moscow studio, complete with all necessary medical equipment for the operation scenes.

Filming for Samara took place between August and December 2011.

== Cast ==
- Oleg Samarin – Artur Smolyaninov
- Lena – Polina Filonenko
- Mikhailych – Leonid Gromov
- Yevgenia Dobrovolskaya
- Vladimir Smirnov
- Yuri Baturin
- Yola Sanko
- Evelina Bledans
- Olga Arntgolts

== Production ==
- Director: Stanislav Dremov
- Cinematographer: Roman Boyko
- Screenwriter: Irakli Abzianidze
- Producers: Yu. Sapronov, A. Smirnov, D. Meskhiev
- Executive Producer: Evgeniya Tsitsina
- Executive Producer: Lilia Gainanova
