= Aleksandr Molochnikov =

Russian actor, director, and screenwriter

- Александр Молочников
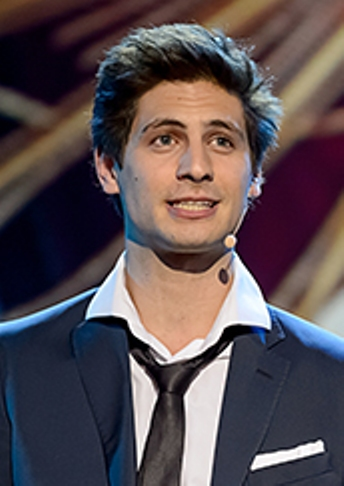
- Born: Aleksandr Aleksandrovich Molochnikov; April 14, 1992 (age 34); Saint Petersburg, Russia
- Occupations: Actor, director, screenwriter
- Years active: 2011–present
- Notable work: Myths; Tell Her; Extremist
- Website: dbd-molochnikov.com

Aleksandr Aleksandrovich Molochnikov (Russian: Александр Александрович Молочников) is a Russian actor, director, and screenwriter, known for his work in theater, film, and television. He gained prominence for directing the satirical comedy Myths (2017), the drama Tell Her (2020), and the short film Extremist (2025), which won two BAFTA Student Awards.

== Early life ==
His father, Aleksandr Molochnikov, is a teacher, and his mother, Anna Nemtsova, is a journalist contributing to Western media. He graduated from the Anichkov Lyceum in 2008 and studied acting and directing at the Russian Institute of Theatre Arts (RATI-GITIS) under Leonid Kheifets, graduating in 2012.

== Career ==
=== Theater ===
Molochnikov served as an actor at the Moscow Art Theatre (MKhT) named after Chekhov from 2012 to 2020, debuting as Vronsky in the play Karenin. His directorial debut, the cabaret-style war drama 19.14 (2015), became a hit at MKhT, earning him two Oleg Tabakov Awards in 2014 and 2015. At age 22, he became the youngest director in MKhT history. His cabaret-style war drama 19.14 (2015) and rock musical Rebels (2016) were included in the long list of the Golden Mask Award for the 2014/2015 and 2015/2016 seasons, respectively, as notable productions according to the Expert Council. At the Malaya Bronnaya Theatre, he staged Bulba. Feast (2020) and Platonov Hurts (2022). In 2024, he directed a cabaret-style adaptation of Crime and Punishment at the Gesher Theatre in Tel Aviv. In 2022, his plays at the Malaya Bronnaya Theatre and Moscow Art Theatre were removed from the repertoire due to his anti-war stance, with Molochnikov learning of the cancellations from actors rather than theatre management.

Molochnikov directed operas The Telephone and The Medium (2019) and the ballet The Seagull (2021) at the Bolshoi Theatre's Chamber Stage, with the latter winning a Golden Mask Award. In 2023, he presented a workshop of The Seagull: Interrupted Flight at the Segal Theatre in New York.

In 2025, he staged The Seagull: A True Story at the La MaMa Ellen Stewart Theatre in New York, inspired by his own experience of leaving Russia after opposing the 2022 invasion of Ukraine, featuring actors Eric Tabach, Andrey Burkovskiy, Zuzanna Szadkowski, Elan Zafir, Quentin Lee Moore, Stella Baker, Ohad Mazor, Keshet Pratt, and Dylan Douglas. The production was included in The New York Times list of best off-Broadway shows.

=== Film and television ===
Molochnikov debuted as an actor in the series Closed School (2011–2012) and Everyone for Themselves (2012). He gained recognition for portraying Nikolai Chekhov in the biographical drama Brothers Ch (2014) and starring in the thriller Cold Front (2016), directed by Roman Volobuev. As a director and screenwriter, he helmed the satirical comedy Myths (2017), co-written with Elena Vanina and Olga Khenkina and produced by Fyodor Bondarchuk. His drama Tell Her (2020), a melodrama produced by Roman Abramovich and starring Svetlana Khodchenkova, Artyom Bystrov, and Kai Getts, was praised as an unconventional family drama and screened at the Russian Film Festival on BFI Player. He directed and co-wrote the series Monastery (2022), which faced a ban from the Russian Ministry of Culture for its critical portrayal of church life. In 2024, he directed a short film tribute to Last Tango in Paris, starring Dylan Douglas and Gus Birney.

==== Extemistka ====
His short film Extremist (2025), depicting the life of Russian artist and former political prisoner Sasha Skochilenko and her partner Sonya Subbotina, won the Live Action Award and Special Jury Award at the 2025 BAFTA Student Awards. The 17-minute film, shot with cinematographer Mikhail Krichman and starring Viktoria Miroshnichenko, Tina Dalakishvili, and Lilian Malkina, also received multiple awards at the 2025 Miloš Forman/Mike Hausman Columbia University Film Festival, including Best Film, James Ponsoldt Award for Best Director, and 3Pas Studios Award for Excellence in Producing.

== Recognition ==
In 2019, Molochnikov was included in the Forbes Russia "30 Under 30" list in the "Art" category, recognizing him as one of the most promising Russians under 30.

== Personal life ==
Molochnikov married Russian actress and comedian Ekaterina Varnava in March 2022, but the couple separated in July 2022, maintaining friendly relations. In 2024, he was reported to be in a relationship with producer and actress Odessa Rae, known for the documentary Navalny. In 2022, facing threats including messages targeting his parents' homes in Moscow and Saint Petersburg, Molochnikov relocated to the United States, enrolling in the directing program at Columbia University, where he graduated in 2025.

== Public stance ==
Following Russia's invasion of Ukraine on 24 February 2022, Molochnikov posted on Instagram in support of Ukraine. He later deleted the post amid online threats from pro-Kremlin figures. In 2019, he participated in solo pickets in Moscow to support actor Pavel Ustinov, who was sentenced for alleged assault during a protest. In 2022, he signed an anti-war letter, contributing to the cancellation of his plays in Russian theaters. His anti-war stance led to his designation as a foreign agent by the Russian Ministry of Justice and the cancellation of his planned opera productions, Francesca da Rimini and A Florentine Tragedy, at the Bolshoi Theatre in 2022, following demands from the parliamentary group GRAD, which also suggested sending him to the Donbas front. During the 2025 BAFTA Student Awards ceremony, Molochnikov highlighted the plight of over a thousand political prisoners in Russia, specifically mentioning theater director Evgenia Berkovich and playwright Svetlana Petriychuk, who were sentenced to over six years in prison for their anti-war views.

== Selected filmography ==
- Closed School (2011–2012, TV series, actor)
- Everyone for Themselves (2012, TV series, actor)
- Brothers Ch (2014, film, actor)
- Cold Front (2016, film, actor)
- Myths (2017, film, director, screenwriter)
- Tell Her (2020, film, director, screenwriter)
- Monastery (2022, TV series, director, screenwriter)
- Last Tango in Paris tribute (2024, short film, director)
- Extremist (2025, short film, director, screenwriter)

== Selected theater ==
- Karenin (2012, MKhT, actor)
- 19.14 (2015, MKhT, director)
- Rebels (2016, MKhT, director)
- Bright Path. 19.17 (2017, MKhT, director)
- The Telephone. The Medium (2019, Bolshoi Theatre, director)
- Bulba. Feast (2020, Malaya Bronnaya Theatre, director)
- The Seagull (2021, Bolshoi Theatre, director)
- Platonov Hurts (2022, Malaya Bronnaya Theatre, director)
- Crime and Punishment (2024, Gesher Theater|Gesher Theatre, director)
- The Seagull: Interrupted Flight (2023, New York, workshop)
- The Seagull: A True Story (2025, New York, director)

== Awards and nominations ==
| Year | Award | Category | Work | Result |
|---|---|---|---|---|
| 2014 | Oleg Tabakov Award | Best Actor | The Amazing Journey of Edward Rabbit | Won |
| 2015 | Oleg Tabakov Award | Best Director | 19.14 | Won |
| 2016 | Golden Mask Award | Drama/Large Scale Production | 19.14 | Nominated |
| 2017 | Golden Mask Award | Drama/Large Scale Production | Rebels | Nominated |
| 2021 | Golden Mask Award | Best Ballet | The Seagull | Won |
| 2025 | BAFTA Student Awards | Live Action Award | Extremistka | Won |
| 2025 | BAFTA Student Awards | Special Jury Award | Extremistka | Won |
| 2025 | Columbia University Film Festival | Best Film | Extremistka | Won |
| 2025 | Columbia University Film Festival | James Ponsoldt Award for Best Director | Extremistka | Won |
| 2025 | Columbia University Film Festival | 3Pas Studios Award for Excellence in Producing | Extremistka | Won |
