= Rowing for Gold =

- Directed by: Artyom Mikhalkov (ru)
- Written by: Mikhail Zubko
- Produced by: Yasmina Ben Ammar; Mariya Grechishnikova; Vadim Vereshchagin; Andrey Tartakov; Anton Zlatopolsky (ru); Natalya Gorina; Platon Emikh; Marina Gurtovaya; Nataliya Ivanov
- Starring: Gleb Kalyuzhny (ru); Andrey Smolyakov; Artyom Bystrov; Elena Lyadova; Vladimir Ilin; Aleksey Kravchenko; Anton Filipenko; Irina Pautva; Ivan Stebunov
- Cinematography: Sergey Machilskiy
- Music by: Ivan Burlyayev; Dmitry Noskov; Konstantin Kupriyanov; Ilya Marfin
- Production companies: Central Partnership Productions; Star Media; Russia-1; Cinema Fund
- Distributed by: Central Partnership
- Release dates: October 1, 2025 (Moscow); October 9, 2025 (Russia)
- Running time: 107 minutes
- Country: Russia
- Language: Russian
- Budget: ₽800 million
- Box office: ₽245 million

Rowing for Gold (Russian: Первый на Олимпе) is a 2025 Russian sports war film directed by Artyom Mikhalkov, tells the story of Soviet rower Yuriy Tyukalov, played by Gleb Kalyuzhny. The film is based on real events and tells the story of how the athlete survived the Siege of Leningrad and subsequently became the first Soviet Olympic champion in rowing.

Rowing for Gold premiered at the "Karo 11 October" at Arbat Square in Moscow on October 1, 2025, and was theatrically released in Russia on October 9, by Central Partnership.

== Plot ==
The film tells the story of a young man named Yura Tyukalov, who, after surviving the war, turned to sports. He met with coaches who helped him start anew. Now, he has a goal: to win a gold medal at the Olympics.

== Cast ==
- Gleb Kalyuzhny as Yuriy Tyukalov, a rower
- Andrey Smolyakov as Ivan Kolosov, an experienced coach
- Artyom Bystrov as Mikhail Savrimovich, a coach
- Elena Lyadova as Vera Savrimovich, a coach
- Vladimir Ilin as Ilyich (or Ilich), a guard and Yura Tyukalov's mentor
- Aleksey Kravchenko as Colonel Levitin
- Anton Filipenko as Sergey Petrovich
- Irina Pautova as Shura Chirikova, Yura Tyukalov's girlfriend
- Ivan Stebunov as Pavel, Shura's fried
- Anton Savvatimov as Sokolov
- Aleksey Timoshenko as Solyanykh
- Ilya Yakubovsky as Ivanitsky
- Guram Bablishvili as Chikhladze
- Ilya Gontash as Makarov
- Timofey Motoshim as Petrov

== Production ==
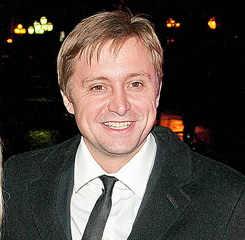
Directed by Artyom Mikhalkov

=== Filming ===
Principal photography began in August 2024, in Saint Petersburg, Leningrad Oblast, Vyborg, Moscow and Sochi.

== Release ==
=== Theatrical ===
Rowing for Gold had its world premiere took place on October 1, 2025, at their “Karo 11 October” cinema center on New Arbat Avenue in Moscow. The film was released in the Russian Federation on October 9, by Central Partnership.
