= The White List (film) =

- Directed by: Alisa Khazanova
- Written by: Roman Volobuev
- Produced by: Artyom Vasilev; Igor Mishin
- Starring: Aleksei Serebryakov; Vladimir Averyanov; Evgeniya Kregzhde; Anastasiya Krasovskaya
- Cinematography: George Dascalescu
- Edited by: Roman Volobuev
- Music by: Igor Vdovin
- Production company: Metrafilm
- Distributed by: MTS Media
- Release date: November 23, 2023
- Running time: 120 minutes
- Country: Russia
- Language: Russian

The White List (Russian: Белый список, translit. Beliy Spisok) is a 2023 Russian police procedural drama film directed by Alisa Khazanova from the script by Roman Volobuev and starring Aleksei Serebryakov. The film is loosely based on the events surrounding the police investigation of Blue Whale Challenge controversy in 2016.

== Plot ==
In the midst of a nationwide moral panic caused by a newspaper article linking a recent spike in teenage suicides across Russia to a viral 'suicide game' two federal investigators are sent to the small Russian town of Podolsk to review a cold case involving a suspicious death of a schoolgirl. Initially seeing their task as a mere PR stunt both gradually start to lose their focus as they venture deeper into the paranoid world of conspiracy theories surrounding the case.

== Cast ==
- Aleksei Serebryakov as Korotkov
- Vladimir Averyanov as Lazarev
- Evgeniya Kregzhde as Melinikova
- Anastasiya Krasovskaya as Litovchenko
- Aleksey Rozin
- Viktoria Miroshnichenko as Solovyova
