= Beanpole (film) =

2019 film by Kantemir Balagov

- Russian: Дылда
- Directed by: Kantemir Balagov
- Written by: Kantemir Balagov; Alexander Terekhov
- Produced by: Alexander Rodnyansky; Sergey Melkumov; Natalia Gorina
- Starring: Viktoria Miroshnichenko; Vasilisa Perelygina; Andrey Bykov; Igor Shirokov; Konstantin Balakirev
- Cinematography: Ksenia Sereda
- Edited by: Igor Litoninsky
- Music by: Evgueni Galperine
- Production company: Non-Stop Production
- Distributed by: Pioner Distribution
- Release date: 16 May 2019 (Cannes)
- Running time: 130 minutes
- Country: Russia
- Language: Russian
- Box office: $2 million

Beanpole (Russian: Дылда, romanized: Dylda) is a 2019 Russian drama film directed and co-written by Kantemir Balagov. It premiered in the Un Certain Regard section of the 2019 Cannes Film Festival. At Cannes, Balagov won the Un Certain Regard Best Director Award and the FIPRESCI Prize for Best Film in the Un Certain Regard section. It was selected as the Russian entry for the Best International Feature Film at the 92nd Academy Awards, making the December shortlist.

The film was inspired by Svetlana Alexievich's book War's Unwomanly Face.

== Plot ==
At the end of the Second World War, Iya Sergeyevna, a tall woman nicknamed "Beanpole" (Дылда), works as a nurse in a Leningrad hospital under Dr. Nikolai Ivanovich. Iya sometimes has fits where she is temporarily immobile, just slightly trembling. She lives in a communal apartment with Pashka, a diminutive three-year-old boy. One day, Iya accidentally smothers the child to death while suffering an episode. Days later, Masha arrives at Iya's room, returning in uniform from the front, and asks where her son Pashka is.

Bitter about his death, yet seemingly unfazed, Masha invites Iya out dancing. They accept the invitation to go with a man Sasha and his friend in their car. Masha orders Iya out of the car to go on a "walk" with Sasha's friend so Masha can have sex with the very bashful Sasha. Iya attacks Sasha's friend when he attempts to seduce her, and beats Sasha over the head when she finds him having sex with Masha. The next day while at a communal bath, Iya notices Masha's abdominal scar, and Masha tells her that she wants to have a child to heal herself.

Masha begins work at the hospital, telling Dr. Ivanovich that she and Iya served together in an anti-aircraft gun crew, but Iya was discharged after suffering a traumatic head injury, while Masha continued serving in the army. Shortly afterwards, the wife of Stepan, a paralyzed soldier, arrives at the hospital to find her husband alive, despite having already told her children that he was killed at war. Stepan cannot bear the idea of returning to his children as a quadriplegic. Alongside his wife, they beg Nikolai Ivanovich to euthanize him. Nikolai is at first extremely opposed to the idea, but eventually relents, asking Iya to do the task and indicating it will be the "last time". Iya hesitantly agrees and during one night injects Stepan. Masha, on night watch and lying down due to suffering from fatigue due to the war, watches Iya and Stepan. Afterward Dr. Ivanovich examines Masha and confirms her infertility.

Masha ask Iya to bear a child that would be Masha's. When Iya vehemently refuses, Masha reminds her that she "owes" her a child after she let Pashka die in her care. At a party, Masha asks Dr. Ivanovich to impregnate Iya; he refuses, but she blackmails him, threatening to make public the euthanasia. Masha says she doesn't care if Iya is also exposed. Later in their room, Iya insists Masha lie against her in bed, while the doctor penetrates Iya, who cries and is distraught.

Masha continues to see Sasha afterwards, frustrating Iya, who is confused and jealous. Iya finds out she is not pregnant. While trying on a dress for their seamstress neighbor, Masha twirls frantically and frenetically over and over and over. Iya calms Masha by kissing her. Masha initially fights her off but Iya suffers an episode, during which Masha kisses her strongly in return. Later, after an argument in which Iya orders Sasha to stop coming to their apartment with food, Sasha invites Masha to meet his parents. Iya walks to Dr. Ivanovich's house and tearfully asks him to impregnate her. He declines, but invites her to come with him and leave the city tomorrow.

Masha visits Sasha's parents at their large, posh estate, where Sasha introduces her as his girlfriend, soon to be wife, but Masha receives a very cold response. The mother judges Masha for having served as an "army base wife" (Походно-полевая жена). Masha intentionally misled Sasha's mother by saying that she lived temporarily with different soldiers, who were capable of providing for and protecting her. Masha "reveals" that her abdominal scar was not caused by a combat shrapnel injury as she had earlier described to the doctor, but by many abortions. Her comment was a stereotype of what civilians thought about fighting women during the war - not respecting those women's sacrifice and heroism. She says what those people could believe in, instead of the truth. She asserts that Sasha loves her, and they will have a child, given to them from her friend. The mother warns Masha that Sasha would become bored with her and discard her. Sasha, enraged, storms out of the room, and Masha rides the tram home alone.

On the way home, Masha's tram hits a tall woman. Masha is unable to recognize the woman dead underneath the tram, and runs home to find Iya having an episode. Iya reveals she is not actually pregnant. Masha begins hitting her, but stops. Masha promises Iya that Sasha won't be coming around any more, and that they will be together from now on, will have a good life and raise a healthy child together, who will resemble both mothers, and will cure them from all pain they have carried until now. The two weep together in an embrace.

== Cast ==
- Viktoria Miroshnichenko as Iya Sergeyevna
- Vasilisa Perelygina as Masha
- Andrey Bykov as Nikolay Ivanovich
- Igor Shirokov as Sasha
- Konstantin Balakirev as Stepan
- Kseniya Kutepova as Lyubov Petrovna
- Alyona Kuchkova as Stepan's wife
- Timofey Glazkov as Pashka
- Veniamin Kac as Sasha's friend
- Olga Dragunova as seamstress
- Denis Kozinets as Sasha's father
- Alisa Oleynik as Katya
- Dmitry Belkin as Shepelev
- Lyudmila Motornaya as Olga
- Anastasiya Khmelinina as Nurse Leonova
- Viktor Chuprov as Ryazanov
- Vladimir Verzhbitskiy as Petrenko
- Vladimir Morozov as Sadikov

== Themes ==
A major theme present throughout the film is the focus on trauma. Much of the conflict in the movie is a result of the suffering both Iya and Masha encountered prior to and during the film. Many of the supporting characters also deal with trauma; this is seen with both the injured soldiers and Dr. Ivanovich. Through things such as Iya's episodes and Masha's inability to have children, the film explores how people react and recover from devastating events. Each character represents a different facet of human nature in their dealings with suffering. For example, Dr. Ivanovich reacts to the trauma of the injured soldiers by trying to ease their pain even if this results in willfully euthanizing them. Iya seems to feel guilty about her trauma, especially the trauma of accidentally suffocating Pashka, and aims to make up for it by pleasing Masha. Meanwhile, Masha is consumed by her sufferings both during the war and after the death of Pashka and reacts with more anger and hostility than either of the two aforementioned characters. Each person's experience and actions serves to show how differently the human mind deals with negative situations and the various outcomes that can occur from this.

A second theme present is the use of color to represent different emotions and ideas during the movie. The film is uniquely portrayed in tints of green and red. The color green is frequently shown throughout the film, usually in circumstances highlighting the potential for hope and new life. Masha wears a green dress and is seen painting the walls a similar color; this signifies her dreams of a better future and the prospect of a new beginning with a new child. A dueling perspective to this theme of hope as green is the use of red in the movie. The color red hints at the suffering and emotional decay experienced by the characters in the film. Masha has nosebleeds when stressed, seen during her encounter with Sasha as she has sex with him knowing she cannot get pregnant. This color scheme is briefly interrupted in Masha's visit to Sasha's home with his parents. The palette switches to more blues highlighting the fact that Russia's upper class does not share the same traumatic experiences as those more directly affected by the war.

Intimacy is another theme that is portrayed throughout the film using different strategic approaches. One strategy the director uses is through the application of long takes. By doing so, the audience is able to understand the emotions and suffering the characters endure without them even speaking. These long takes, combined with the close-up shots allow for the development of intimacy not only between Masha and Iya, but also with the audience. The bond between the two characters is further intensified through their actions rather than their words. These two strategies enable the viewers to gain a better appreciation for the impact of war through facial expressions and emotion rather than the physical destruction of buildings and cities. Another aspect of intimacy that is shown in the movie is the loss of youth. During the time period of the war, when men and women enlisted, they were about 18 years old and often younger. As they returned home with PTSD or other life-long injuries, they often tried recreate their youth through games, music, dancing or other hobbies. One example of this within the film is when Masha begins to twirl in her new dress. While she looks clumsy at first, this is ultimately a sign of her regaining confidence in her youth. However she continues to dance and ultimately reaches the point where she starts to cry, realizing she will never gain back the happiness of her previous youth ever again.

A fourth theme briefly explored by the film is the class disparity of the post World War II Soviet Union people. Masha, Iya, and even Dr. Ivanovich are all active participants of the war and feel its effects in all that they do. When Masha visits Sasha and his family it is clear that they do not share the same experiences. Masha and Sasha's mother have a stand off in which it is made clear the two women could not be more dissimilar. The sequence at the mansion serves to highlight that the struggles of those around the hospital are seen by wealthier members of society such as Sasha but not understood or necessarily moved by. This is resonated by the mother's belief Sasha will quickly leave Masha once the experience is no longer new, serving to further her trauma and emotional dissonance.

== Release ==
In April 2019, it was announced Beanpole would debut in the Un Certain Regard section at the 2019 Cannes Film Festival in May.

== Reception ==
=== Box office ===
Beanpole grossed $196,258 in the United States and Canada and $1.8 million in other territories for a worldwide total of $2 million.

=== Critical response ===
On review aggregator Rotten Tomatoes, the film holds an approval rating of 93% based on 107 reviews, with an average rating of 7.8/10. The website's critical consensus reads, "Filmed with impressive skill and brought to life by unforgettable performances, Beanpole takes a heartbreakingly empathetic look at lives shattered by war." On Metacritic, the film has a weighted average score of 84 out of 100 based on 26 critics, indicating "universal acclaim".

=== Accolades ===
Award	Date of ceremony	Category	Recipient(s) and nominee(s)	Result	Ref(s)
Cannes Film Festival	25 May 2019	FIPRESCI Prize - Un Certain Regard	Kantemir Balagov	Won	
Cannes Film Festival	25 May 2019	Best Director - Un Certain Regard	Kantemir Balagov	Won	
Cannes Film Festival	25 May 2019	Queer Palm	Kantemir Balagov	Nominated	
Cannes Film Festival	25 May 2019	Prix Un Certain Regard	Kantemir Balagov	Nominated	
European Film Award	7 December 2019	Best Actress	Viktoria Miroshnichenko	Nominated	
Austin Film Critics Association Awards	19 March 2021	Best Foreign Language Film	Beanpole	Nominated	
Asian Pacific Screen Awards	2019	Best Screenplay	Beanpole	Won	
Asian Pacific Screen Awards	2019	Achievement in Cinematography	Ksenia SEREDA	Won	

== See also ==
- List of submissions to the 92nd Academy Awards for Best International Feature Film
- List of Russian submissions for the Academy Award for Best International Feature Film
