= The Story Won't Die =

2021 documentary film

- Directed by: David Henry Gerson
- Produced by: Odessa Rae
- Starring: Abu Hajar; Diala Brisly; Tammam Azzam; Omar Imam; Medhat Aldaabal; Bahila Hijazi; Lynn Mayya; Anas Maghrebi; M.H.D. Sabboura
- Cinematography: Luise Schröder
- Edited by: David Henry Gerson; Christopher Robin Bell
- Production company: RaeFilm Studios
- Release date: April 29, 2021 (Hot Docs)
- Running time: 83 minutes
- Countries: United States; Germany; Denmark
- Languages: Arabic; English

The Story Won’t Die is a 2021 United States documentary film about Syrian refugee artists navigating displacement during the Syrian civil war. It is directed by filmmaker David Henry Gerson, and produced by Academy Award-winning producer Odessa Rae, and co-produced by Syrian journalist and co-founder of Raqqa Is Being Slaughtered Silently, Abdalaziz Alhamza.

== Background ==
As a child growing up in the US, and having internalized his father’s experience growing up in post-Holocaust German refugee camps, Gerson has said, "these stories of exile and how to process exile were encoded in my DNA". At a post screening panel after the Hot Docs festival Variety premiere, Gerson stated, "When I heard that the crisis in Syria was the largest displacement of people on the planet since World War II, something told me I had to pay attention to this."

Gerson has cited Pablo Picasso's anti-war painting Guernica and Francisco Goya's The Third of May 1808, which commemorates Spanish resistance to Napoleon's army, as inspirations for the project. He says it began with him asking, "Who is making the Guernica of the Syrian civil war? Who is making the Third of May of the Syrian civil war?"

== Synopsis ==
The film weaves together the stories of nine Syrian artists who fled their homeland during the Syrian civil war. Dancers, musicians, and visual artists speak about how they used their art to protest Bashar al-Assad’s regime and process their experiences in the face of repression and displacement.

== Artists ==
- Medhat Aldaabal, choreographer
- Tammam Azzam, visual artist
- Diala Brisly, visual artist
- Mohammad Abu Hajar, political rapper
- Bahila Hijazi, rock musician
- Omar Imam, photographer
- Anas Maghrebi, musician
- Lynn Mayya, audiovisual artist and electronic music producer
- M.H.D. Sabboura, dancer

== Reception ==
The film premiered at the 2021 Hot Docs Canadian International Documentary Festival, and had its US premiere in June 2021 at the AFI Docs Film Festival.

On the review aggregator website Rotten Tomatoes, 100% of eight critics' reviews are positive.

Variety's Guy Lodge said that the film, "Successfully keeps the big picture and the smaller canvas in conscientious balance, disrupting overwhelming tragedy with more hopeful flashes of invention and inspiration."

The New York Times' Devika Girish wrote, "In the face of wars, genocides and other atrocities, does art-making serve any purpose? David Henry Gerson’s documentary, ‘The Story Won’t Die,’ answers with a resounding yes."
