= Extremist (film) =

Short film by Aleksandr Molochnikov

- Экстремист(ка) (Russian)
- Directed by: Aleksandr Molochnikov
- Written by: Aleksandr Molochnikov, Mikhail Durnenkov
- Produced by: Jean Chapiro
- Starring: Viktoria Miroshnichenko; Tinatin Dalakishvili; Liliyan Malkina
- Cinematography: Mikhail Krichman
- Distributed by: The New Yorker (short film acquisition)
- Release date: September 5, 2025 (Telluride)
- Running time: 17 minutes
- Countries: Latvia, United States
- Language: Russian

Extremist (Russian: Экстремистка, romanized: Ekstremistka) is a 2025 short drama film written and directed by Russian filmmaker Aleksandr Molochnikov. The 17-minute film dramatizes events inspired by the real-life case of Aleksandra Skochilenko and follows a young artist (portrayed by Viktoriya Miroshnichenko) whose act of protest, in which she replaces supermarket price tags with anti-war messages, leads to her arrest and prosecution.

== Cast ==
- Viktoria Miroshnichenko as the Artist
- Tinatin Dalakishvili
- Lillian Malkina
- Artur Smolyaninov

== Production ==
Extremist was written and directed by Aleksandr Molochnikov as a Columbia University student film project, Jean Chapiro is credited as a producer.

== Release ==
The film premiered on the 2025 festival circuit, including its Telluride Film Festival screening, and subsequently screened at university and regional film festivals. The New Yorker acquired the short for distribution following its festival run.

== Accolades ==
- BAFTA Student Film Awards (2025) — Live Action Award; Special Jury Award.
- Jury Prize — New Hampshire Film Festival (2025).
- National Board of Review — Student Grant
- Best Film, James Ponsoldt Award for Best Director, and producing awards at the Miloš Forman / Mike Hausman Columbia University Film Festival (2025)

== See also ==
- Aleksandra Skochilenko
