= Tell Her (film) =

- Release poster
- Directed by: Aleksandr Molochnikov (ru)
- Written by: Aleksandr Molochnikov; Ilya Tilkin (ru); Aleksandr Talal
- Produced by: Aleksandr Tsekalo; Ivan Samokhvalov (ru); Aleksandra Remizova; Aleksey Kozlov; Anastasia Fateeva; Daniel Shapovalov; Elena Serebryannaya
- Starring: Kay Aleks Getts; Artyom Bystrov; Svetlana Khodchenkova; Wolfgang Cerny
- Cinematography: Janis Eglitis
- Edited by: Sergey Ivanov
- Music by: Igor Vdovin (ru)
- Production companies: Sreda; Bad Decisions Productions
- Distributed by: Walt Disney Studios
- Release dates: September 2020 (Kinotavr); May 13, 2021 (Russia)
- Running time: 98 minutes
- Country: Russia
- Languages: Russian, English
- Budget: $2 million (estimated)
- Box office: ₽5 million; $69,557

Tell Her (Russian: Скажи ей, romanized: Skazhi ey) is a 2020 Russian children's drama film written and directed by Aleksandr Molochnikov about the effects of divorce, a woman goes with her son to America, leaving her husband, who cannot imagine life without a son, the film stars Kay Aleks Getts, Artyom Bystrov, Svetlana Khodchenkova and Wolfgang Cerny.

Tell Her was theatrically released in Russia on May 13, 2021 by Walt Disney Studios.

== Plot ==
The film follows Sasha (Kay Aleks Getts) in 1990s Saint Petersburg, Russia. Sasha barely remembers his parents, Sveta (Svetlana Khodchenkova) and Artyom (Artyom Bystrov), as happy together. Artyom, a teacher, is content with a modest life, while Sveta feels trapped and ultimately leaves him for an American, Michael (Wolfgang Cerny). Sasha, who spends three days a week with his father, finds himself caught between his parents. Tensions rise when Sveta reveals plans to move to the United States with Sasha. Artyom opposes the move, and both parents, along with their own families, try to win Sasha’s loyalty. The conflict weighs on Sasha, and only his illness convinces Artyom to agree to the move.

In America, Sasha adjusts well, even becoming class president, but he soon faces challenges. What starts as a prank at a pizzeria leads to trouble with the police. Sveta blames Artyom’s influence and decides to end their contact. Artyom arrives in America to reconnect, but their conversation turns into a confrontation. Sasha runs away and, in frustration, sets fire to Michael’s car. Sveta finds him, and after an emotional exchange, they reconcile. Sasha asks to return to Russia with his father, and the final scene shows them together in Saint Petersburg, suggesting Sveta has relented.

== Cast ==
- Kay Aleks Getts as Sasha, a boy the consequences of divorce
- Artyom Bystrov as Artyom, Sasha's dad
- Svetlana Khodchenkova as Sveta, Sasha's mother
- Wolfgang Cerny as Michael, Sveta's second husband
- Aleksei Serebryakov as Alya
- Marina Ignatova as grandmother Marina
- Igor Chernevich as grandfather Zhenya
- Irina Rozanova as grandmother Valya

== Production ==
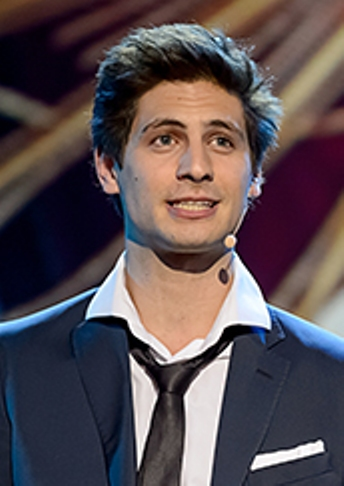
Directed by Aleksandr Molochnikov.

The plot of the film is partly autobiographical for Aleksandr Molochnikov. His parents, like that of the main character, are divorced; as a child, he lived in America. Although Molochnikov himself says that the story has nothing to do with his family directly.

=== Filming ===
Principal photography took place in 2019 on the territory of Saint Petersburg, Russia, and California, United States.

== Release ==
The premiere of the film took place at the festival 31st Kinotavr-2020 was held in the city of Sochi from September 11 to 18, 2020, the film participated in the main competition. It was released in the Russian Federation on May 13, 2021 by Walt Disney Studios.
