= Gerda (film) =

- Directed by: Natalya Kudryashova
- Written by: Natalya Kudryashova
- Produced by: Dmitry Davidenko; Rafael Minasbekyan; Roman Stolyarsky; Vadim Vereshchagin
- Starring: Anastasiya Krasovskaya; Yuri Borisov; Darius Gumauskas; Yuliya Marchenko; Mariya Leonova; Mariya Ivanova; Yulia Ogun; Serafima Krasnikova; Mariya Pesotskaya; Sofya Aleksandrova; Tatiana Okwamo
- Cinematography: Vasiliy Grigolyunas
- Production companies: Central Partnership; Kinoprime; Red Media
- Distributed by: Central Partnership
- Release dates: August 2021 (Locarno); October 14, 2021 (Russia)
- Running time: 90 minutes
- Country: Russia
- Language: Russian

Gerda (Russian: Герда) is a 2021 Russian drama film directed by Natalya Kudryashova (Natalia Kudryashova) and starring Anastasiya Krasovskaya.

== Plot ==
The film tells about a girl named Lera who lives in the province. Her mother naively believes in miracles, and her father abandoned the family. Lera wants to improve her life, but she doesn't know how. At the same time, she constantly sees dreams in which she sees her soul. And the more difficult life becomes, the more often she sees such dreams.

== Cast ==
- Anastasiya Krasovskaya as Lera
- Yuri Borisov as Oleg
- Darius Gumauskas as father
- Yuliya Marchenko as mother
- Mariya Leonova as Tamara
- Mariya Ivanova as Tanya
- Yulia Ogun as Naomi
- Serafima Krasnikova as Nadya
- Mariya Pesotskaya as Lera as a child
- Sofya Aleksandrova as Michelle
- Tina Stoyilkovich as Marina

== Release and accolades ==
The film screened in the competition program of the 74th Locarno Film Festival in Switzerland in August 2021.

It was theatrically released in Russia on 14 October 2021.

== Awards ==
- Anastasiya Krasovskaya won the Best Actress Award and the special prize from the youth jury of the festival at the Locarno Film Festival.
- Best Feature Film in the Stalker Human Rights Film Festival in Moscow
