= I Never Said Goodbye (film) =

2025 American independent drama film

- Directed by: Yev K'banchik
- Written by: Yev K'banchik
- Produced by: Yev K'banchik
- Starring: Artur Smolyaninov
- Cinematography: Yev K'banchik
- Edited by: Yev K'banchik
- Release dates: September 20, 2025 (PIFF); November 21, 2025 (Latvia)
- Running time: 70 minutes
- Country: United States
- Language: English

I Never Said Goodbye is a 2025 American independent drama film written, directed, and produced by Ukrainian filmmaker Yev K'banchik. It stars Artur Smolyaninov in his first English-language role.

The story follows Alex (Smolyaninov), an Eastern European immigrant living in Baltimore, Maryland, as he struggles to process the recent death of his mother. While navigating a landscape of fractured identities and new relationships in the United States, Alex finds himself caught between the memories of his past life and the isolation of his present.

The film screened at the 2025 Prague Independent Film Festival, where it won the award for Best Feature Film and Smolyaninov received the award for Best Actor.

== Cast ==
- Artur Smolyaninov — Alex
- Autumn Breaud — Doctor
- Ramone Brown — Ramone
- C.C. Gallagher — Mechanic
- Katie Hileman — Receptionist
- Maranda Kosten — Social worker
- Chinai Routté — Shannon

== Production ==
The film was shot over a period of 20 days in Baltimore. It was a minimalist production, filmed by K'banchik without a traditional crew, serving as his own cinematographer and editor. The project was initially conceived as a short film of approximately 20–30 minutes, but it evolved during production into a 70-minute feature due to the amount of material captured and the improvisational nature of the performances.

Director Yev K'banchik drew heavily from his own biography, including his experience as a Ukrainian immigrant and the death of his mother from cancer. Smolyaninov, who moved to Latvia from Russia following his opposition to the Russian invasion of Ukraine, noted that the character of Alex mirrored his own experience as a man negotiating a new life in the West while being a "regular guy" rather than a public figure.

=== Accolades ===
Year	Award	Category	Nominee	Result
2025	Prague Independent Film Festival	Best Feature Film	I Never Said Goodbye	Won
2025	Prague Independent Film Festival	Best Actor	Artur Smolyaninov	Won
