= Seven Versts Before Dawn =

- Directed by: Alexandr Andreev
- Written by: Natalia Shumak; Alexandr Andreev
- Based on: The Last Day of Matvey Kuzmin by Boris Polevoy
- Produced by: Marina Selivanova; Ali Uzdenov; Daria Tsiberkina; Nadezhda Ponarovskaya
- Starring: Fyodor Dobronravov; Maria Shukshina; Viktor Dobronravov; Artyom Bystrov; Oleg Gaas; Vyacheslav Chepurchenko; Sergei Kempo; Natalya Surkova; Yuliya Shubareva
- Cinematography: Elena Metla
- Edited by: Elena Metla; Boris Boitcov; Alexandr Andreev
- Production companies: Reka Studio; Ministry of Defence; Government of the Pskov Oblast
- Distributed by: Karo Premier
- Release date: April 30, 2026 (Russia)
- Running time: 102 minutes
- Country: Russia
- Language: Russian
- Box office: ₽101 million

Seven Versts Before Dawn (Russian: Семь вёрст до рассвета) is a 2026 Russian WWII film directed by Alexandr Andreev, telling the story of the heroic deed of the oldest Hero of the Soviet Union, peasant Matvey Kuzmich Kuzmin, during the Great Patriotic War. The film is based on the story The Last Day of Matvey Kuzmin by Boris Polevoy.

The script for the film was written by Natalia Shumak and Alexandr Andreev. Marina Selivanova, Ali Uzdenov, Daria Tsiberkina, and Nadezhda Ponarovskaya were producers. The film's cinematographer was Elena Metla. The soundtrack for the film was written by Ivan Burlyayev, Konstantin Novgorodsky, and Nikita Urbansky. Based on real events, it stars Fyodor Dobronravov, Maria Shukshina, Viktor Dobronravov, Artyom Bystrov, Oleg Gaas, and Vyacheslav Chepurchenko.

This film was theatrically released in Russia on April 30, 2026, Karo Premier Film Distribution.

== Cast ==
- Fyodor Dobronravov as Matvey Kuzmin, a peasant on the Rassvet collective farm
- Maria Shukshina as Yefrosinya Shabanova, Matvey Kuzmin's second wife
- Viktor Dobronravov as Ivan
- Artyom Bystrov as Zakhar
- Oleg Gaas as Maksimilian fon Vinberg
- Vyacheslav Chepurchenko as Zemlinsky, a scout
- Sergei Kempo as Colonel Stepan Gorbunov
- Natalya Surkova as Lyubov
- Yuliya Shubareva as Natasha

== Production ==
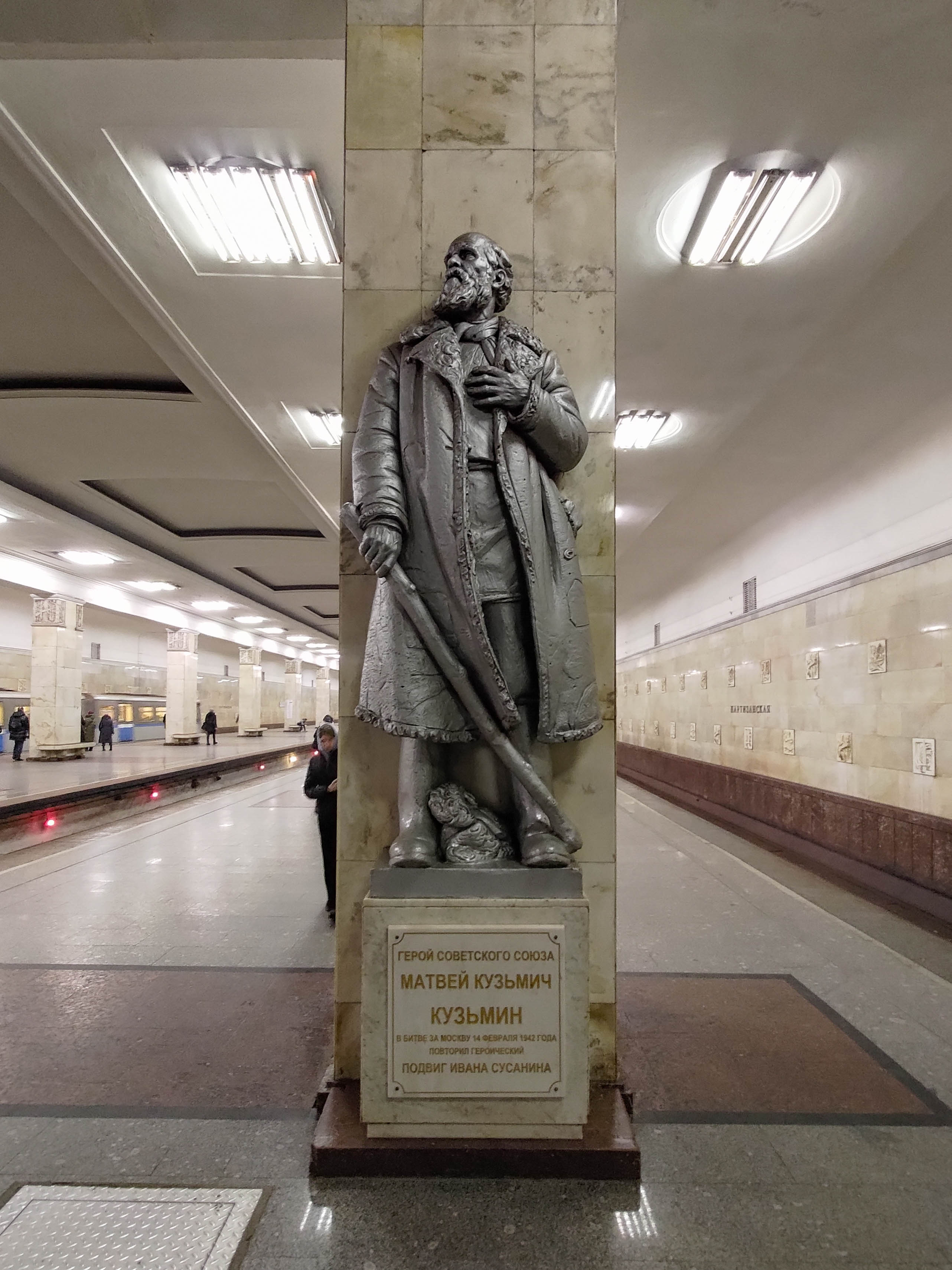
Monument to Hero of the Soviet Union Matvey Kuzmin at the Partizanskaya metro station in Moscow.

The film was produced by the Reka film studio with the support of the Russian Ministry of Defense, the Rostec state corporation, the Rosgosstrakh insurance company, and the Government of the Pskov Oblast.

The screenplay, co-written by Natalia Shumak and Andreev, is based on the true story of Matvey Kuzmich Kuzmin, a character written by Boris Nikolayevich Polevoy. The film is timed to coincide with Victory Day celebrations.

=== Filming ===
Filming took place from November 2024 to 2025 in the region of Pskov Oblast. The main filming locations were in the town of Velikiye Luki, Pskov Oblast. Specifically, the "Doctor's House," which belonged to a zemstvo hospital in the early 20th century, was converted into a German commandant's office. The village of Kurakino in the film is depicted by another village, Busulaevo, Nevelsky District, Pskov Oblast, Russia. The houses where the protagonist and his neighbors live were specially rebuilt. The filmmakers also built a road, planted vegetable gardens, brought in pets, and even installed a beehive. To maintain historical accuracy, they worked with archives, consulted with experts, and found an eyewitness, a local grandmother who lived in a nursing home.
