= This is Horosho =

- This is Хорошо
- Genre: Video blog
- Created by: Vitaly Golovanov
- Country of origin: Latvia
- Original language: Russian
- No. of episodes: over 500

Production
- Production locations: Riga, Latvia
- Running time: ~5 min

Original release
- Network: YouTube; Channel One
- Release: October 16, 2010

This is Horosho, stylized as This is Хорошо (meaning "good"), is a Latvian web series in Russian first aired on October 16, 2010. It is similar to Ray William Johnson's Equals three. Stas Davydov, its host, reviews three viral videos submitted by users and makes satirical comments on them. Its episodes are traditionally released on Tuesdays and Fridays. From January to May 2012, the show was aired on Russia's Channel One. The show is based in Riga, Latvia where a large Russian-speaking population lives.

The producing team is composed of three people: Stas Davydov is the host, Vitaly Golovanov is the producer and Sergey Fedoronko is the PR-manager.

In 2011, This is Horosho was named the best Russian video blog of the year.

As of November 2016, the YouTube channel has more than 1 billion views and over 5 million subscribers.

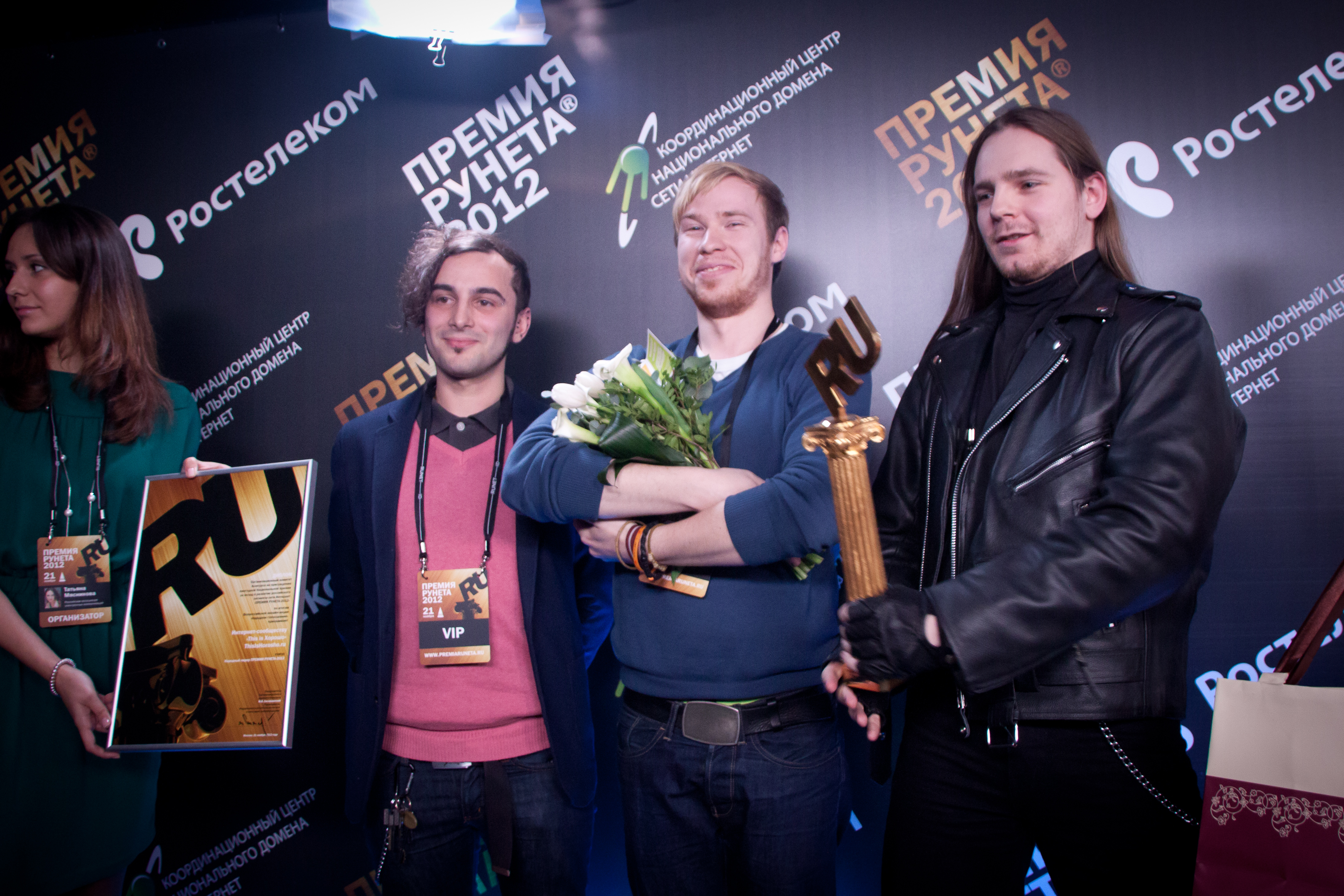
This is Horosho at the Runet Prize
