= Dina Saeva =

Russian model and vlogger (born 1999)

- Born: Madina Ikhromidinovna Isroilova; August 24, 1999 (age 27); Dushanbe, Tajikistan
- Citizenship: Tajikistan; Russia
- Occupations: Model; Vlogger
- Parents: Ikhromidin Isroilov (father); Idimo Isroilova (mother)

TikTok information
- Page: Dina Saeva
- Followers: 24.9M
- Last updated: October 2024

Madina Ikhromidinovna Isroilova (Russian: Мадина Ихромиддиновна Исроилова; born August 24, 1999, Dushanbe, Tajikistan) known professionally as Dina Saeva, is a Russian vlogger, singer and model of Tajik descent. She is the most followed TikTok contributor from Tajikistan and one of the most popular accounts on the platform. She currently lives in Dubai, UAE.

As of April 8, 2025, she has 24.7 million followers on TikTok.

== Biography ==
Saeva was born in 1999 in Dushanbe, Tajikistan. Dina is the first child, and has a younger sister and brother.

At the start of 2020, Dina was a new ambassador for Dolce & Gabbana.

At the end of 2020, Dina began a music career, publishing her first song «Я ищу тебя».

== Personal life ==
At one point, Saeva was reportedly in a relationship with singer Egor Kreed, though she denied it.

== Discography ==
=== Singles ===
Year	Title	Notes
2020	«Я ищу тебя»	Digital single, released 4 December 2020
2025	Vostochnye skazki	Digital single, released 21 February 2025

== Awards and nominations ==
Year	Award	Nomination	Results	Notes
2020	Results of year 2020 per the TV channel «ТНТ Music»	TikToker of the year	Nominated	8th place

== Guest in works of other singers' music videos ==
Year	Title of music video	Singer(s)	Роль в клипе
2019	Love is	Egor Kreed	Friend of the main character
2020	Boom Boom	Loboda & Pharaoh	cameo
2021	Build a b*tch	Bella Poarch	cameo
