= Artyom Bystrov =

Russian actor

- Артём Быстров
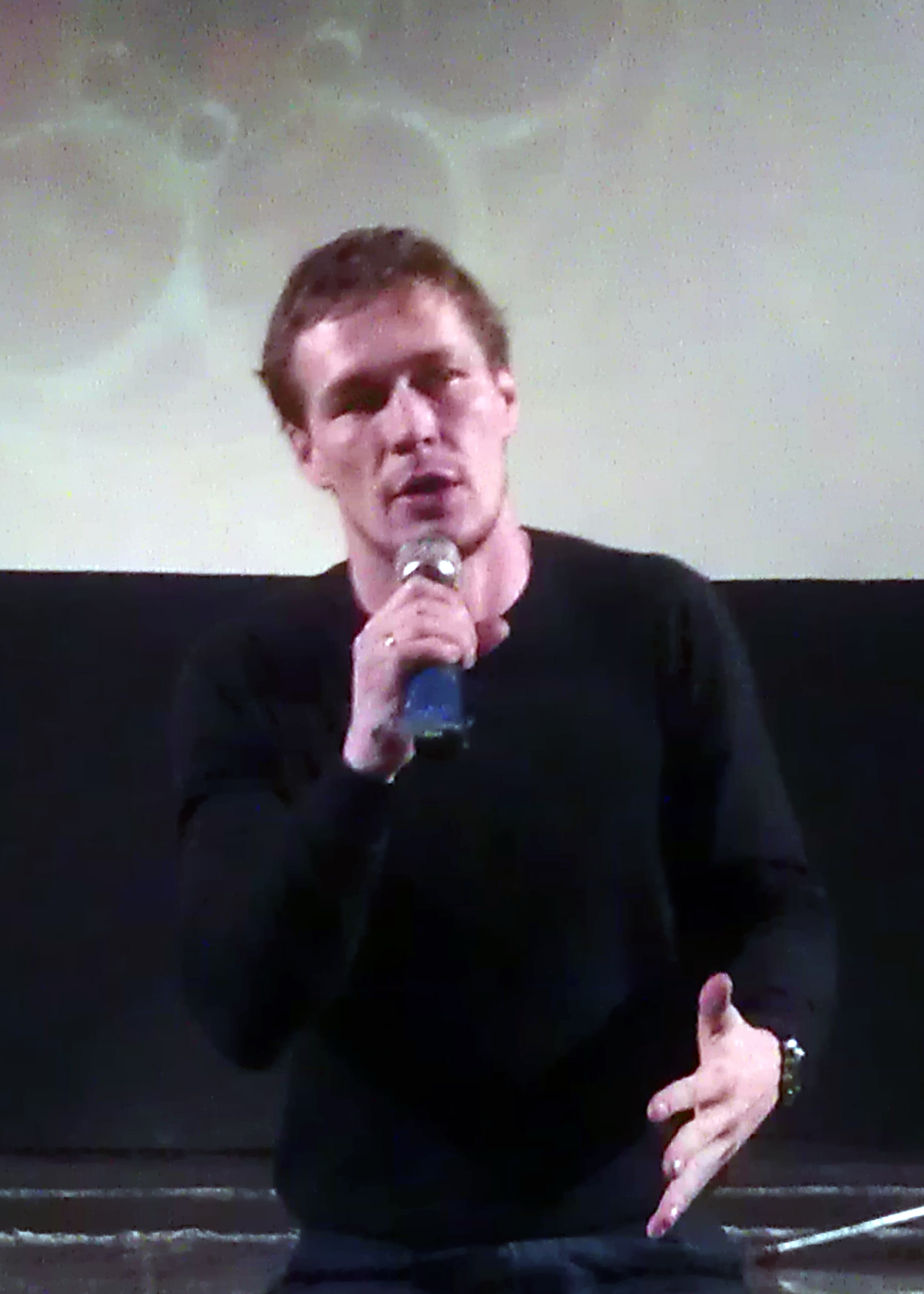
- Artyom Bystrov in 2015
- Born: Artyom Nikolaevich Bystrov; March 19, 1985; Gorky, RSFSR, USSR
- Citizenship: Soviet Union (until 1991); Russia
- Occupations: Actor; Theater teacher
- Years active: 2009-present
- Awards: Russian Federation Presidential Certificate of Honour

Artyom Nikolaevich Bystrov (Russian: Артём Никола́евич Быстро́в; born March 19, 1985) is a Russian actor. He appeared in 40 films. Winner of the Leopard for Best Actor on Locarno Festival (2014).

== Biography ==
Bystrov was born in Gorky, Russian SFSR, Soviet Union (now Nizhny Novgorod, Russia). He studied at the Nizhny Novgorod Theater School, after which he moved to Moscow, where he entered the Moscow Art Theatre School, and after graduation he was accepted into the troupe of the Moscow Art Theater named after A.P. Chekhov.

== Selected filmography ==
Year	Title	Role	Notes
2011	Burnt by the Sun 2: The Citadel		
2014	Break Loose	"Sin"	
2014	The Fool	Dmitry Nikitin	
2014	Yolki 1914	Valeryan	
2016	Earthquake	Grisha	
2019	T-34	captain Mikhail Korin	
2021	Tell Her	Artyom	
2021	The Little Warrior	Sumo Coach	
2021	An Hour Before Dawn	Andrey Savchenko	
2021-2023	Container	Igor Razumovsky	
2022	Monastery	Victor	
2023	Cheburashka	young Gena	
2025	Rowing for Gold	Mikhail Savrimovich	
2026	Seven Versts Before Dawn	Zakhar	
