= Eighth Initiative Group =

Group of feminist activists in Saint Petersburg, Russia

The Eighth Initiative Group (Russian: Восьмая Инициативная группа) is a group of feminist activists in Saint Petersburg. It has existed since 2018, and has an anti-war theme.

To mark International Women's Day 2021, the group organized a protest of around 100 people. In December 2021 they demonstrated in support of Memorial International, laying flowers at the Solovetsky Stone along with municipal deputy Vitaliy Bovar.

On February 23, 2022, the day before Russia's full-scale invasion of Ukraine, activists from the Eighth Initiative Group organized a 'silent picket' against the war on the Saint Petersburg Metro. The group has announced an anti-war rally for March 6.
