= Maria Abashova =

Russian ballet dancer

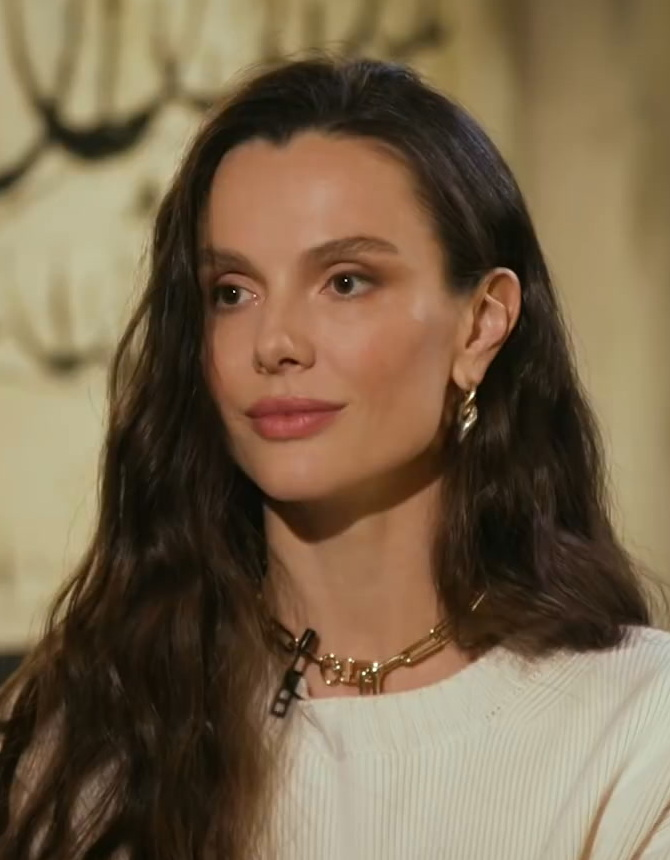
- Abashova in 2020
- Born: Мария Юрьевна Абашова; September 6, 1983 (age 42); Lviv, Ukrainian SSR, Soviet Union
- Citizenship: Russia
- Education: St. Pölten Ballet Conservatory, Austria
- Occupation: Ballet dancer
- Years active: from 2002
- Career
- Current group: Eifman Ballet
- Dances: Anna Karenina, Nina Zarechnaya, Camille Claudel, Empress, von Meck and others
- Awards: YAGP's golden medal, 2002; Zolotaya maska, 2006; Zolotoy sofit, 2007

Maria Yurievna Abashova (Russian: Мария Юрьевна Абашова) is a Russian ballerina who is principal dancer at the Eifman Ballet, St. Petersburg. She studied at St. Pölten Ballet Conservatory, Austria.

Abashova excelled and became acknowledged by critics in Anna's part in Anna Karenina ballet by Boris Eifman.

Built like an imperial Borzoi, Maria Abashova, as Anna, is eye riveting every moment she is on stage. Choreography that made the most of her physical attributes allowed her time and again to extend a line from fingertip to toe that seemed to stretch on forever. Voluminous skirted costumes reminiscent of Martha Graham's fluid jerseys, abetted the illusion of endless leg.

== Awards ==
- 2002 : Golden medal (women, classical dance) of the Youth America Grand Prix competition, New York City
- 2006 : Zolotaya maska award for role of Anna Karenina in Anna Karenina by Boris Eifman
- 2007 : Zolotoy sofit award for role of Nina Zarechnaya in Chayka by Boris Eifman
