= Anton Ptushkin =

Ukrainian documentary filmmaker, television presenter, YouTuber, traveler, journalist

Honored Journalist of Ukraine Anton Ptushkin
- Антон Птушкін
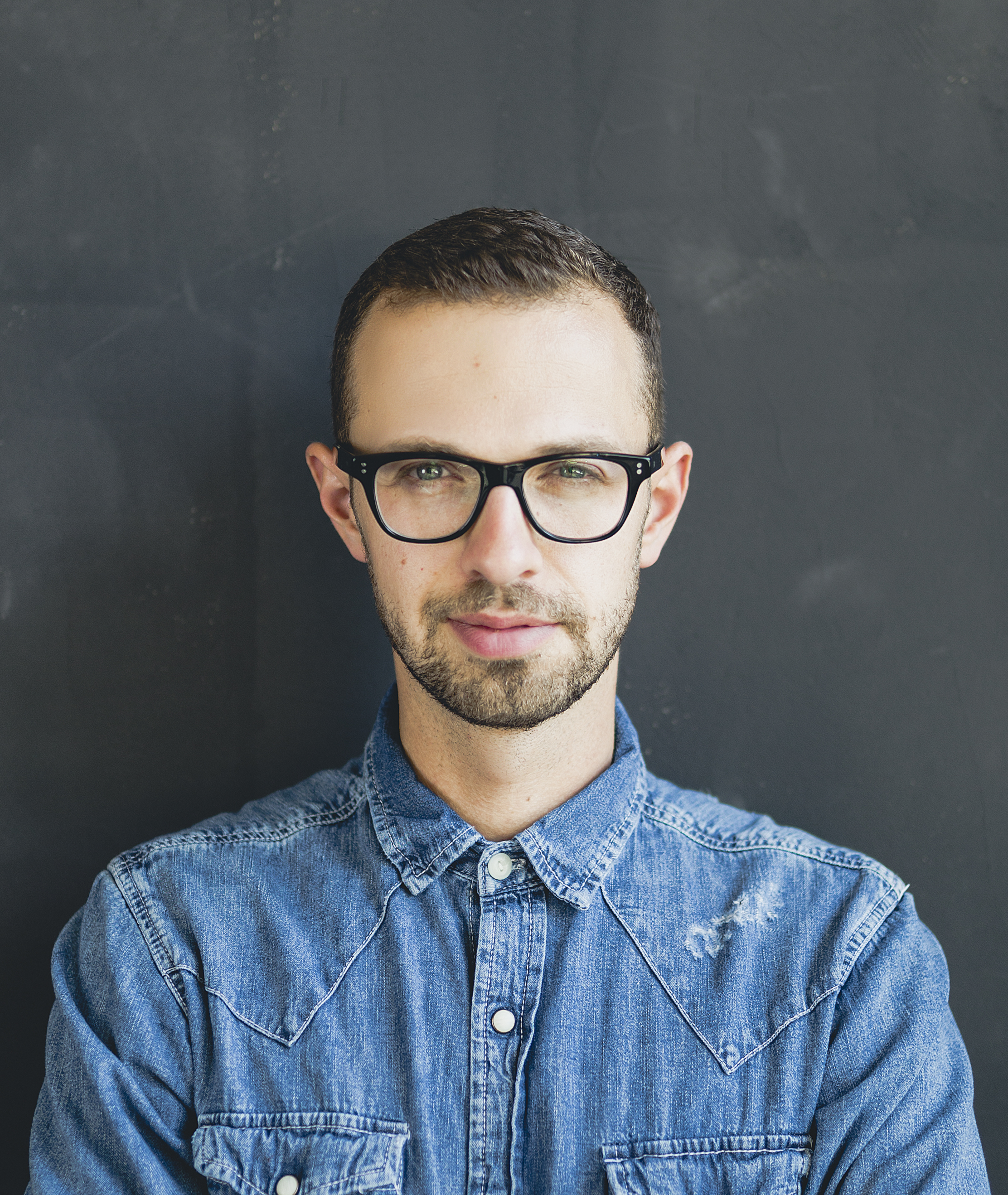
- Ptushkin in 2018
- Born: 22 May 1984 (age 42); Voroshilovgrad, Ukrainian SSR, Soviet Union (now Luhansk, Ukraine)
- Education: East Ukrainian Volodymyr Dahl National University
- Occupations: TV presenter; YouTuber; Traveller; Journalist; DJ
- Honours: Honored Journalist of Ukraine

Anton Yuriiovych Ptushkin (Ukrainian: Антон Юрійович Птушкін; born 22 May 1984) is a Ukrainian documentary filmmaker, television presenter, YouTuber, traveller, journalist, and DJ. He is known for having made "Saving the Animals of Ukraine: An Untold Story of War" and for hosting the television travel series Oryol i Reshka. Ptushkin was awarded the Honored Journalist of Ukraine title in 2020.

== Early life and career ==
Ptushkin was born on 22 May 1984 in Voroshilovgrad (now Luhansk), a city in eastern Ukraine. He graduated from the East Ukrainian Volodymyr Dahl National University achieving a degree of sociology. After his graduation, he worked in a night club in Luhansk as a DJ and an art director.

In 2012, he moved to the capital, Kyiv and started to work at a radio station. He was the founder and director of the radio broadcast channels Lounge FM and Radio Piatnytsia.

In 2017, he became the host of travel series Oryol i Reshka with Nastya Ivleeva. Together they filmed 3 seasons, totaling 65 episodes.

In June 2018, he announced that he had quit filming the series. Neither Ptushkin nor the TV show Teen Spirit Studio company stated the reason for his departure. His position in the show was taken over by Yevsey Kovalyov.

After quitting the show, Ptushkin spent more time filming travel videos on his YouTube channel. He also claimed that he ran his channel alone, without the help of cameramen, film editors and screenwriters.

In 2025, he released the film "Antarctica: The Big Feature", which documents the activities of Ukrainian researchers in Antarctica in the years following the Russian invasion of Ukraine. It was published to his YouTube channel for free in December of 2025.

Ptushkin has a total of 5 YouTube channels, five posting in different languages, including the main channel in Russian (formerly, before 2023) and the four other channels in English, Ukrainian, Spanish and Portuguese.

== Awards and honours ==
- 2020 – Honored Journalist of Ukraine.
