= Ida Galich =

Russian blogger and singer (born 1990)

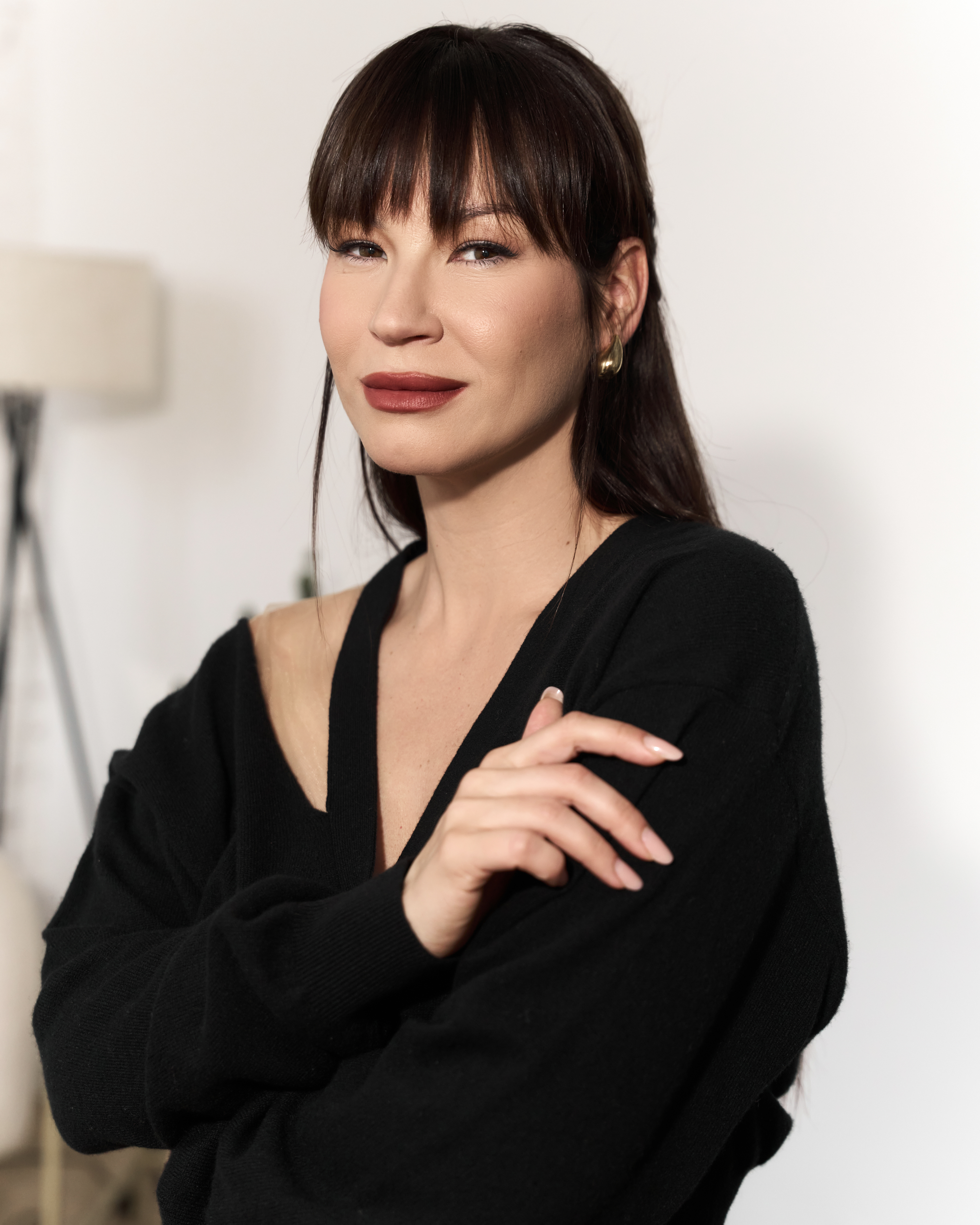
- Born: May 3, 1990 (age 36); East Germany
- Occupations: Singer; vlogger; tv presenter
- Children: Leon (born 2020)

Ida Vasilevna Galich (Russian: И́да Васи́льевна Га́лич; after marriage: Basieva; born 3 May 1990, East Germany) is a Russian TV presenter, singer, and blogger.

== Biography ==
In 2018, released the songs «Дима», «Ты попал», and «Найти тебя». The song «Найти тебя» came with a music video that featured Anna Sedokova, Nadezhda Sysoeva, Yulia Koval & Anton Karavaytsev. In 2019, the track «Предприниматель» was released, which came with a music video. That same year, Galich participated on the show Comment Out with rapper Kievstoner. In 2019, Galich started her own show under the title «1–11».

== Personal life ==
On 11 May 2018, Galich married Alan Basiev. On 14 August 2019 she announced she was pregnant. In mid December 2020, the couple announced they would be breaking up.

== Shows ==
=== "Ida Galich Show: 1–11" ===
Season 1	No.	Guest	Date	
Season 1	1	Екатерина Варнава	14.05.2019	
Season 1	2	Тимур Батрутдинов	16.05.2019	
Season 1	3	Ёлка	21.05.2019	
Season 1	4	Ольга Серябкина	23.05.2019	
Season 1	5	Анна Седокова	28.05.2019	
Season 1	6	Юрий Музыченко	30.05.2019	
Season 2	1	Nastya Ivleeva	19.11.2019	
Season 2	2	Дима Билан	21.11.2019	
Season 2	3	Регина Тодоренко	26.11.2019	
Season 2	4	Полина Гагарина	28.11.2019	
Season 2	5	Александр Гудков	03.12.2019	
Season 2	6	Юлианна Караулова и Kyivstoner	05.12.2019	
Season 2	7	Эльдар Джарахов	10.12.2019	
Season 2	8	Илья Прусикин и Софья Таюрская	12.12.2019	
March 8	1	Danya Milokhin	06.03.2021	
March 8	2	Антон Шастун	09.03.2021	
Season 3	1	Denis Dorokhov	27.04.2021	
Season 3	2	Дима Масленников	27.05.2021	
Season 3	3	Клава Кока	03.06.2021	
Season 3	4	Артур Бабич и Аня Покров	17.06.2021	
Season 4	1	Roman Kagramanov	28.04.2022	
Season 4	2	Карина Кросс	26.05.2022	
Season 4	3	Стас Просто Класс	02.06.2022	
Season 4	4	Ирина Мягкова	16.06.2022	
Season 5	1	Vladimir Selivanov and Valentina Mazunina	08.11.2022	
Season 5	2	Агата Муцениеце	15.11.2022	
Season 5	3	Артём Муратов и Айдар Гараев	22.11.2022	
Season 5	4	Ольга Бузова	29.11.2022	
Season 5	Season 6	1	Yulia Gavrilina	15.03.2023
2	Season 6	Vanya Dmitrienko	22.03.2023	
3	Season 6	David Manukyan	29.03.2023	
4	Season 6	Azamat Musagaliyev	05.04.2023	
5	Season 6	Varvara Shcherbakova	24.05.2023	
6	Season 6	Mary Gu	07.06.2023	
7	Season 6	Arseny Popov	21.06.2023	
8	Season 6	Nadezhda Sysoeva	04.07.2023	
9	Season 6	Mia Boyka	18.07.2023	
10	Season 6	Ida Galich	01.08.2023	
11	Season 6	Alla Mikheeva or Vladimir Marconi	31.08.2023	
12	Season 6	Kukoyaki	17.10.2023	
13	Season 6	Dmitriy Zhuravlev	24.10.2023	
14	Season 6	IOWA	07.11.2023	
15	Season 6	Ruslan Usachev	14.11.2023	
16	Season 6	Ramil'	21.11.2023	
17	Season 6	Katya Adushkina	28.11.2023	
18	Season 6	Kseniya Borodina	05.12.2023	

=== "Ida Galich Show: Any Questions" ===
Season	No.	Guest	Date	
Season	1	Настя Ивлеева	20.07.2021	
Season	2	Dava	19.08.2021	
Season	3	Екатерина Варнава	26.08.2021	
Season	4	Клава Кока	21.10.2021	
Season	5	Ксения Собчак	28.10.2021	
Season	6	Агата Муцениеце	11.11.2021	
Season	7	Лолита	18.11.2021	
Season 1	1	Karina Kross	13.04.2023	
Season 1	2	Антон Шастун	20.04.2023	
Season 1	3	Саша Стоун	27.04.2023	
Season 1	4	Ольга Картункова	04.05.2023	
Season 1	5	Максим Матвеев	18.05.2023	
Season 1	Season 2	1	Alexander and Oleg Sheps	21.09.2023
2	Season 2	Mari Kraimbrery	05.10.2023	
3	Season 2	Maria Minogarova	19.10.2023	
4	Season 2	Elena Novikova	02.11.2023	
5	Season 2	Vladimir Marconi	16.11.2023	
6	Season 2	Vika Skladchikova	30.11.2023	
7	Season 2	Ida Galich	28.12.2023	
8	Season 2	Oksana Samoilova	15.02.2024	
9	Season 2	Igor Dzhabrailov	05.03.2024	

=== Singles ===
Year	Title
2018	«Дима»
2018	«Ты попал»
2018	«Найти тебя»
2019	«Предприниматель»
2019	«Вызывай милицию»
2020	«Капельки» (with ХЛЕБ)

== Videos ==
External videos
- «Дима» (2018)
- «Ты попал» (2018)
- «Найти тебя» (2018)
- «Предприниматель» (2019)
- «Вызывай милицию» (2019)
- «Капельки» (2020)

Year	Video	Director
2018	Дима	Sasha Guschin
2018	Ты попал	Rina Kasyura
2018	Найти тебя	Rina Kasyura
2019	Предприниматель	Rina Kasyura
2019	Вызывай милицию	Rina Kasyura
2020	Капельки; (feat. ХЛЕБ)	Valentin Grosu
Участие у других исполнителей
2020	Мона Лиза (video of VADA)	Valentin Grosu
2020	Boom Boom (video of Loboda)	Roman Kim & Misha Semichev
2021	Ла Ла Ла (video of Klava Koka)	Taras Golubkov
2021	Нам не нужен герой (video of Bi-2)	Max Shishkin

=== Director ===
Year	Singer	Video
2020	Elina Chaga	Водитель

== Awards and nominations ==
Year	Award	Nomination	Results	Ref.
2018	ОК! «Больше чем звёзды»	Главный герой. Герой из сети	Won	
2018	ZD Awards-2018	Hype of the year	Nominated	
2018	Российская веб-премия	Online Personality of the year	Nominated	
2019	Премия RU.TV 2019	Internet Singer	Nominated	
