= Leonid Heifetz =

Russian stage director and drama teacher (1934–2022)

- Леонид Хейфец
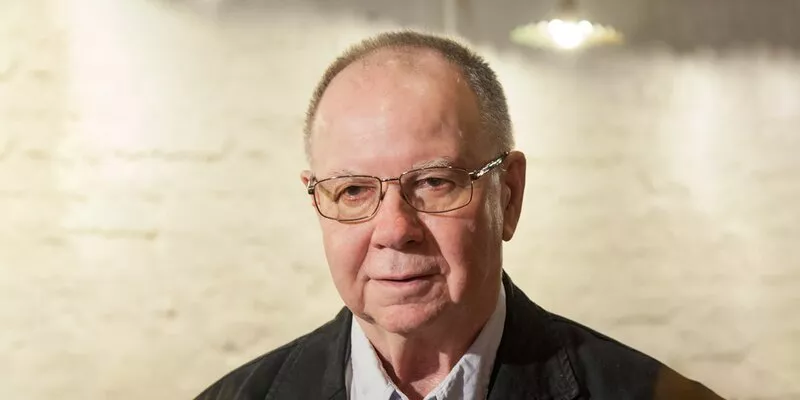
- Born: Leonid Yefimovich Heifetz; 4 May 1934; Minsk, Byelorussian SSR, USSR
- Died: 18 April 2022 (aged 87); Moscow, Russia
- Education: Belarusian National Technical University; Russian Institute of Theatre Arts
- Occupations: Director, teacher
- Years active: 1962–2022
- Spouse: Natalya Gundareva
- Awards: Order of Honour; People's Artist of Russia; Medal "In Commemoration of the 850th Anniversary of Moscow"

Leonid Yefimovich Heifetz (also spelled "Kheifets" Russian: Леонид Ефимович Хейфец; 4 May 1934 – 18 April 2022) was a Russian stage director and drama teacher. He was the first husband of the actress Natalya Gundareva.

== Biography ==
In 1995, Heifetz directed Janusz Glowacki's Antigone in New York, at the Contemporary Play School.

From 1998 to 2022 - director of the Mayakovsky Theatre.

In 2000, he staged the play The Cherry Orchard at the Mossovet Theatre.

He died on April 18, 2022, in Moscow at the age of 88 from a detached blood clot. Farewell to the director took place on April 21 at the Mayakovsky Theater. He was buried at the Troyekurovskoye Cemetery.
