= Aleksandra Skochilenko =

Russian artist and musician (born 1990)

- Александра Скочиленко
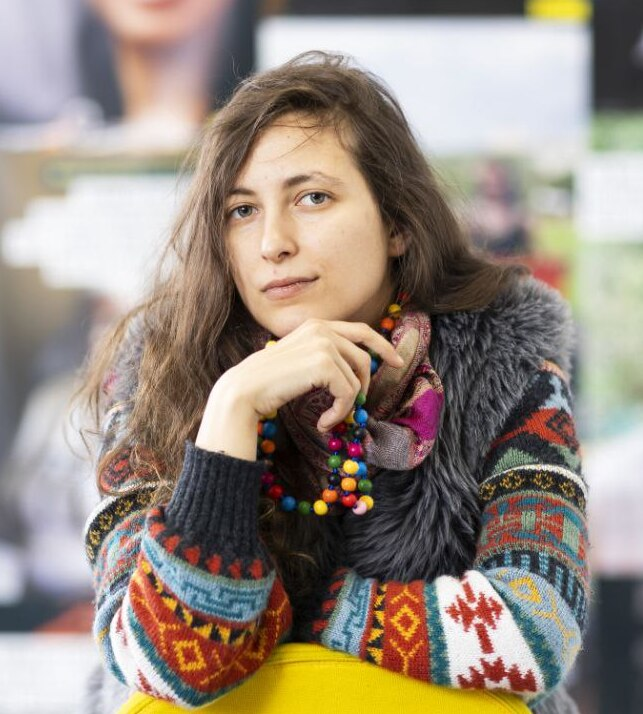
- Born: 13 September 1990 (age 36); Leningrad, Russian SFSR, Soviet Union (now Saint Petersburg)
- Education: Saint Petersburg State University
- Occupations: Artist; musician

Aleksandra Yuryevna Skochilenko (Russian: Александра Юрьевна Скочиленко; born 13 September 1990), also known as Sasha Skochilenko, is a Russian artist, musician, poet, and former political prisoner.

Skochilenko was detained in April 2022 for distributing anti-war messages in Saint Petersburg. Amnesty International declared Skochilenko a prisoner of conscience, the Memorial human rights organization recognized her as a political prisoner, and the BBC included her on its 100 Women in 2022. In November 2023, Skochilenko was sentenced to seven years in prison under Russia's "fake news" law.

She was released in Ankara on 1 August 2024 as part of a complex international exchange of prisoners. Analyzing the event for CNN, Nathan Hodge wrote that Skochilenko's experience "laid bare the absurdity of Russia’s draconian wartime media laws".

== Personal life ==
Aleksandra Skochilenko was born in Leningrad, Russian SFSR, Soviet Union (now Saint Petersburg, Russia). She attended the Smolny College of Liberal Arts and Sciences, Saint Petersburg State University. She is the author of Book About Depression (2014), which helped destigmatise mental health issues in Russia. She is an open lesbian and her partner participated in publicizing her criminal case and the conditions of her detention.

== Activism and arrest ==
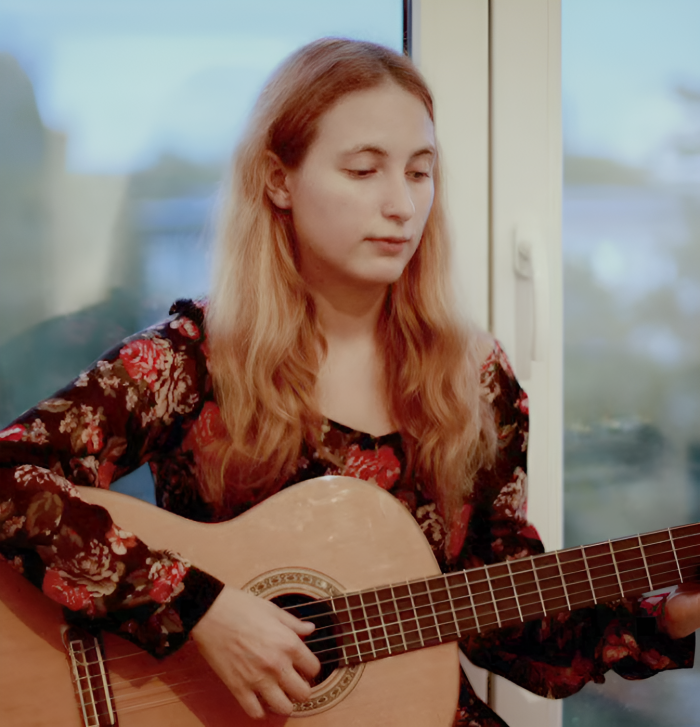
Skochilenko before her arrest

Skochilenko joined several protests against the 2022 Russian invasion of Ukraine. At a protest on 3 March 2022 in the centre of Saint Petersburg, she was arrested and detained overnight. She was fined 10,000 rubles.

On 11 April 2022, Skochilenko was arrested for "putting fragments of paper in place of price tags, containing information about the use of the Russian armed forces" in a Perekrestok supermarket on 31 March. The messages attributed to her included information about the Mariupol theatre airstrike on 16 March: "The Russian army bombed an art school in Mariupol where about 400 people were hiding from the shelling." Skochilenko was accused of being motivated by "political hatred for Russia" and jailed for eight weeks pending trial.

She was charged under Article 207.3 part 2 of the Criminal Code of the Russian Federation, the recently introduced Russian wartime censorship laws. She faced a sentence of up to ten years imprisonment. In a letter from jail in April 2022, Skochilenko wrote: "It just so happened that I represent everything that the Putin regime is so intolerant of: creativity, pacifism, LGBT, psycho-enlightenment, feminism, humanism, and love for everything bright, ambiguous, unusual." On 30 May, the Saint Petersburg District Court extended her pre-trial detention until July in a closed hearing. In early June, she was temporarily transferred to a psychiatric hospital, where staff refused to treat her for abdominal pain and refused to share information about her condition with her lawyer and partner. On 30 June, the Russian Ministry of Internal Affairs's Centre for Combating Extremism issued a report alleging that Skochilenko was a member of the Eighth Initiative Group, which it described as a "radical protest feminist group". Skochilenko denied knowledge of the group. Following those claims, the court extended her pre-trial detention until September.

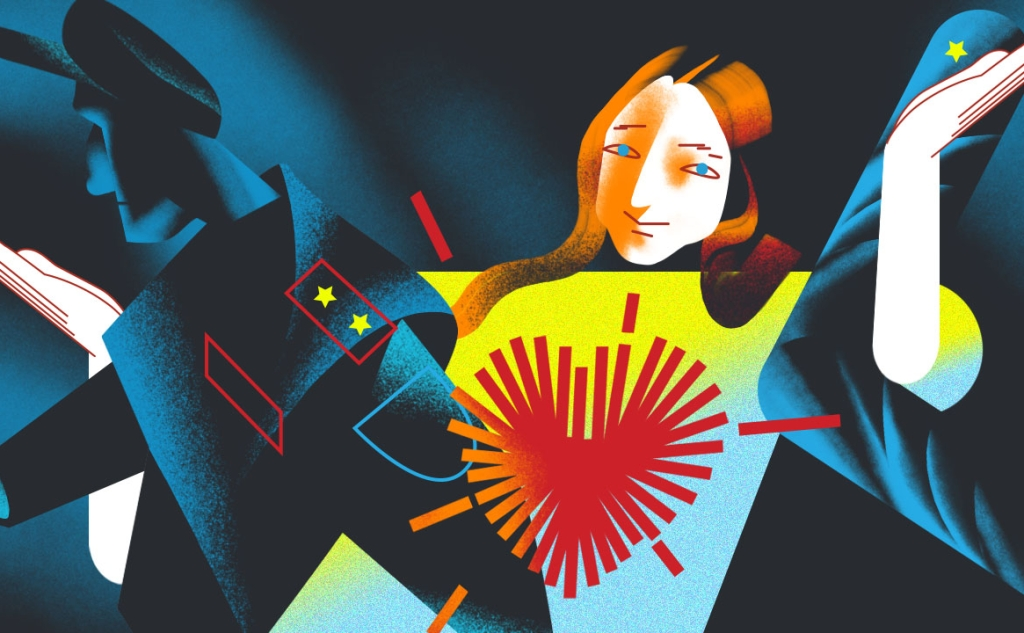
An illustration showing Skochilenko being dragged away by the police

Human rights groups raised concerns about the conditions of her detention, as she suffers from a congenital heart defect, PTSD, and coeliac disease, the last of which requires a gluten-free diet that she was not being provided, resulting in significant weight loss. Her partner was also denied permission to visit her while in detention. In a July interview with Radio Free Europe/Radio Liberty, Skochilenko raised additional concerns about possible mistreatment, saying that she and the other prisoners in her cell had been forced to clean the cell three times a day by hand and the television in the cell was restricted to war films and pro-government news about the Russian invasion of Ukraine.

On 7 July 2023, she was ordered to remain in pretrial detention until 10 October.

== Verdict ==
On 16 November 2023, she was sentenced in a Saint Petersburg court to seven years imprisonment for replacing supermarket price tags with antiwar slogans in 2022. In her statement to the court before the verdict was announced, she told the presiding judge: "Your honour, you have a unique opportunity to show an example to society with your verdict ... You can show how to resolve conflict with the help of words and compassion." During the proceeding, the judge threatened to clear the court after spectators laughed when a prosecutor called Russia a democracy.

== Recognition and support ==
In June 2022, Memorial designated Skochilenko a political prisoner and Amnesty International declared her a prisoner of conscience. She was named as one of the BBC's 100 Women in 2022.

From 31 March to 29 April 2023, The Koppel Project in London hosted an exhibition titled "SKOCHILENKO: THE PRICE OF FREEDOM". Curated by the Russian Democratic Society, this event showcased her works, known for their poignant and thought-provoking pieces that delve into themes of freedom, expression, and political activism.

Her activism and imprisonment were featured in two PBS "Frontline" television documentaries: Putin’s War at Home (2022) and Sasha & Sonia: A Russian Love Story (2023).

== Release ==
Skochilenko's mother, Nadezhda Skochilenko, feared authorities would impose additional charges against her daughter when, in July 2024, some political prisoners were moved to new locations. She had one day's notice that she would be released. Skochilenko later reported being taken from her Saint Petersburg cell, moved without explanation, and threatened with death for asking what was happening. She said: "It felt like we were being taken out to be shot." On 1 August 2024, Skochilenko was released in Ankara as part of the 2024 Ankaran prisoner exchange. Skochilenko's partner, Sonia Subbotina, confirmed that Skochilenko was preparing to travel from Ankara to Cologne with most of the other released Russians. She arrived that night in Cologne and was held in a quarantine hospital. Her mother said: "She is continuing to believe that miracles are possible. She has shown that if you are kind and pro-peace then good things can happen."

== Post-release activities ==
In September 2025, Skochilenko organized a musical jam session in Berlin to mark the publication of her memoir "My Prison Trip".
