= Tima Belorusskih =

Belarusian singer and songwriter

Tima Belorusskih Тима Белорусских Тимофей Андреевич Морозов
- Born: October 1, 1998 (age 27); Minsk, Belarus
- Genres: Europop; Pop; Hip Hop
- Occupations: Singer; rapper; songwriter
- Years active: 2017 (as Samzanov); 2017–present (as Tima Belorusskih)
- Label: Kaufman Label

Tsimafei Andreevich Marozaw (Belarusian: Цімафей Андрэевіч Марозаў), or Timofey Andreevich Morozov (Russian: Тимофей Андреевич Морозов; born 1 October 1998), better known by his stage name Tima Belorusskih, is a Belarusian singer, rapper and songwriter. He began his solo career as Samzanov, before releasing his first single as Tima on 3 May 2017. His 7th single, Wet Sneakers (Russian: Мокрые кроссы), was his first big hit, reaching 35th on the Apple Music Top 100 in Russia for 2018 and winning the HEAT music award for Hit of the Year. Throughout his entire career, he has been signed to the small Belarusian record label Kaufman Label.

In 2019, Tima released his first album, Your First Disc is my Cassette (Russian: Твой первый диск – моя кассета), and was later nominated for the RU.TV Powerful Start award. 1111 On 23 November 2019, he was awarded a Russkoye Radio Golden Gramophone at the 2019 Golden Gramophone awards.

== Biography ==
Tsimafei Andreevich Marozau was born on 1 October 1998, in the Belarusian capital of Minsk. His mother, a music teacher, and his father, an opera soloist, allowed Tima to be exposed music from a young age. His mother often played the music of English bassist Sting, while his father enjoyed guitarist and pianist Leonid Agutin. His father also regularly sang and played their piano. From 3 years old, after his parents' divorce, his father brought him on his tours in Germany every summer.

According to Tima, he had always had an interest in music. As such, at 6, Tima's parents took him to a music school and presented him with different instruments, where he settled on playing the cello. Though he never engaged in sport professionally, he was especially fond of football during his time in primary school before slowly losing interest and moving further to music. He had also spent time working selling ice-cream and as a dockworker, and, at the time of releasing Wet Crosses, a server at a restaurant.

After completing primary school, Tima began attending the Belarusian State Academy of Music, though he soon after moved to a linguistics college. After completing school, he started to study for an art degree, though he only attended for under a semester. Throughout his attendance at school, he achieved high grades.

In 2016, Tima's current record label, Kaufman Label, were holding auditions in the Minsk club Re: Public. While Tima performed, only one of the three judges voted for him. After reviewing auditions from other applicants, and selecting two different artists, the label's administrator told the judges to listen to his single RASSVET. They liked it, though felt it "had to be rewritten". Eventually, they contacted Tima at 2am to bring him into the studio.

His stage name, Tima Belorusskih, was chosen as he wanted to stay associated with Belarus, even while popular in other countries.

== Personal life ==
Tima has said that he tries to keep his personal life separate from his music career, and as such he is rarely seen together with his girlfriend. However, in 2019, the Russian newspaper SUPER announced that he has a daughter, Sofia, who was born in 2015. At the time, Tima was 16 years old and his partner, Yana, was 17.

== Discography ==
=== Albums ===
Year	Title
2019	Your First Disc is my Cassette (Russian: Твой первый диск – моя кассета): Released 30 January 2019; Label: Kaufman label
2020	My Cassette is Your First Disc (Russian: Моя кассета – твой первый диск): Released 31 January 2020; Label: Kaufman label

=== Singles and EPs ===
Year	Title
2017	RASSVET
2017	Again (Заново)
2018	Rain (Дождь)
2018	(He) took and flew (Взял и полетел)
2018	Song About A Girl (Девочка-песня)
2018	Hey, Lets Roll. (Привет, давай перевернём)
2018	Wet Sneakers (Мокрые кроссы)
2018	About Simple (О простом)
2018	Sparks (Искры)
2018	Offline (Не онлайн)
2018	Forget-Me-Not (Незабудка)
2019	Vitaminka (Витаминка)
2019	I won't write anymore (Я больше не напишу)
2019	Trains (Поезда)
2019	A habit of running away (Привычка убегать)
2019	Fast (Пост)
2019	Alenka (Алёнка)
2019	Kiss (Целовать)
2019	Will find you (Найду тебя)
2019	Alpha and Omega (Альфа и Омега)
2019	Minute of the Evening (Минута вечера) (feat. просто Лера)
2020	Film (Фотоплёнка)
2020	Drawn to you (тянет к тебе)
2020	Freckles (Веснушки)
2020	The Last Time (В последний раз)
2020	Okey (Окей)
2021	Lost Myself (Потерял Себя)
2021	Still melting (Таёт Ещё)
2021	You better not know (Тебе лучше не знать)
2021	Ran past (Пробегал мимо)
2021	Under the stars (Под Звездопадом)
2021	Wood (Дерево)
2023	Let go (Отпусти)
2023	Memories (Воспоминания)
