= Arash discography =

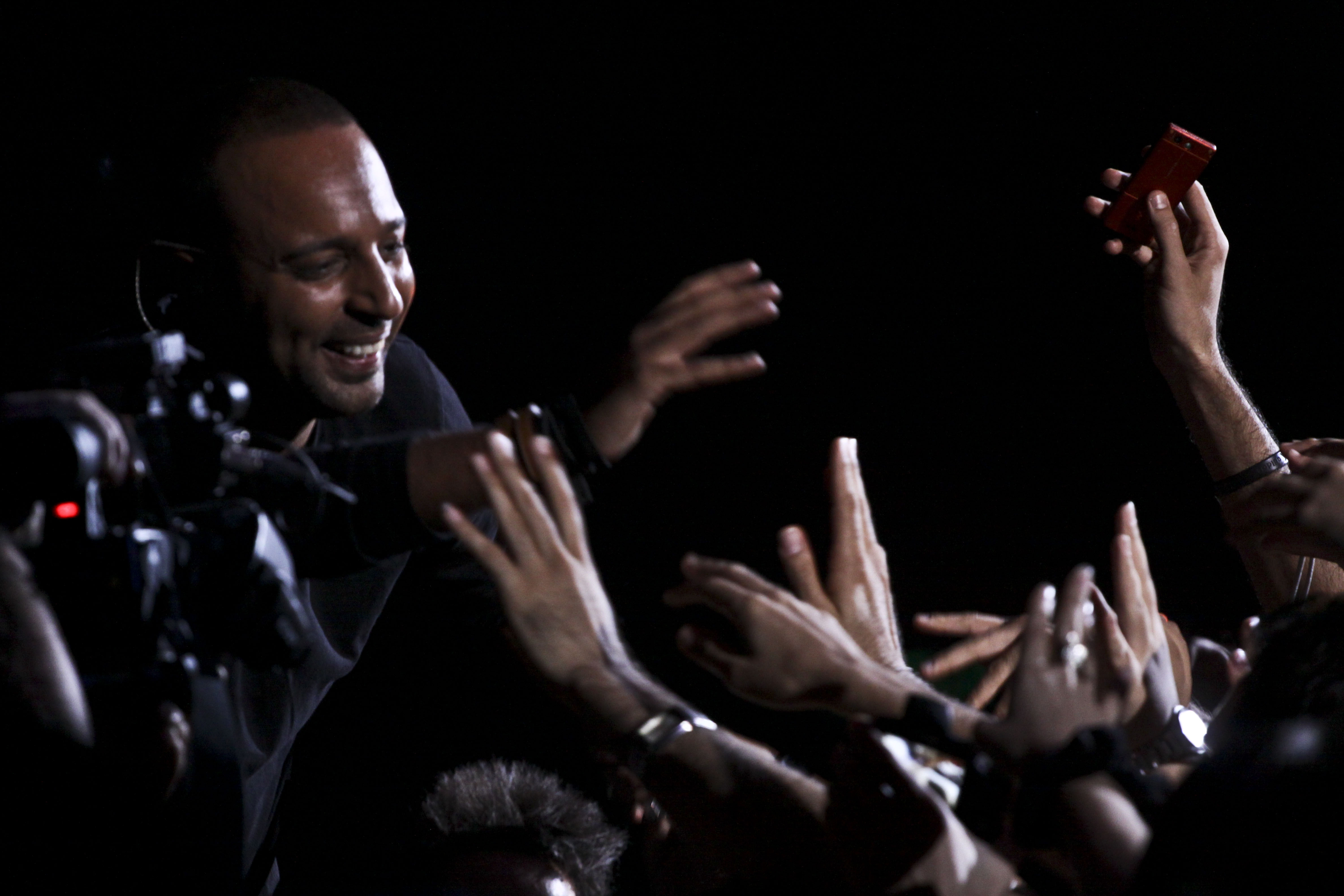
- Arash at Kuala Lumpur concert
- Studio albums: 3
- Singles: 35
- Music videos: 25
- Remix albums: 1

The discography of Arash, a singer, songwriter and producer, consists of three studio albums, remix album, compilation album, 35 singles and three featured singles.

== Albums ==
=== Studio albums ===
| Title | Album details | Peak chart positions | | | | Certifications | Sales |
| Title | Album details | SWE | SUI | HUN | POL | Certifications | Sales |
|---|---|---|---|---|---|---|---|
| Arash | Released: 1 February 2005; Label: Warner Music Sweden; Format: CD, digital download | 17 | 36 | 6 | — | RUS: 3× Platinum; GER: Gold; GRE: Gold; SVK: Gold | RUS: 60,000+ |
| Donya | Released: 1 January 2008; Label: Warner Music Sweden, Extensive Music; Format: CD, digital download | 48 | — | — | 23 | POL: Gold | POL: 10,000+ |
| Superman | Released: 4 November 2014; Label: Broma 16; Format: Digital download | — | — | — | — | | |
"—" denotes album that did not chart

=== Remix albums ===
| Title | Album details | Peak chart positions |
| Title | Album details | POL |
|---|---|---|
| Crossfade (The Remix Album) | Released: 1 April 2006; Label: Warner Music Sweden; Format: CD, digital download | 24 |

== Singles ==
=== As lead artist ===
| Year | Title | Peak chart positions | | | | | | | | | | Certifications | Album |
| Year | Title | SWE | AUT | BEL (WA) | DEN | FRA | FIN | GER | NOR | SWI | UK | Certifications | Album |
|---|---|---|---|---|---|---|---|---|---|---|---|---|---|
| 2004 | "Boro Boro" | 1 | 22 | — | — | — | 12 | 11 | — | 8 | — | IFPI SWE: Gold | Arash |
| 2005 | "Tike Tike Kardi" | 2 | — | — | 19 | — | — | — | — | — | — | | Arash |
| 2005 | "Temptation" (featuring Rebecca) | 2 | — | — | — | — | 15 | 29 | — | 42 | — | | Arash |
| 2006 | "Arash" (featuring Helena) | 20 | — | — | — | — | 8 | 64 | — | — | — | | Arash |
| 2006 | "Chori Chori" (featuring Aneela) | — | — | — | — | — | 5 | 47 | — | 82 | — | | Donya |
| 2008 | "Donya" (featuring Shaggy) | — | — | — | — | — | — | — | — | — | — | | Donya |
| 2008 | "Suddenly" (featuring Rebecca) | 8 | — | — | — | — | — | — | — | — | — | | Donya |
| 2008 | "Pure Love" (featuring Helena) | — | — | — | — | — | 19 | — | — | — | — | | Donya |
| 2009 | "Always" (by Aysel and Arash) | 3 | — | — | — | — | — | 96 | 18 | 98 | 137 | | Donya |
| 2009 | "Près de toi" (featuring Najim & Rebecca) | — | — | — | — | — | — | — | — | — | — | | Non-album single |
| 2009 | "Kandi" (featuring Lumidee) | — | — | — | — | — | — | — | — | — | — | | Donya |
| 2010 | "Dasa Bala" (featuring Timbuktu & Yag) | — | — | — | — | — | — | — | — | — | — | | Donya |
| 2010 | "Broken Angel" (featuring Helena) | — | — | — | — | — | — | — | — | — | — | | Superman |
| 2010 | "Glorious" | — | — | — | — | — | — | — | — | — | — | | Non-album single |
| 2012 | "Melody" | — | — | — | — | — | — | — | — | — | — | | Superman |
| 2012 | "She Makes Me Go" (featuring Sean Paul) | 55 | 8 | 24 | — | 16 | 11 | 5 | — | 13 | — | BVMI: Gold; IFPI SWI: Gold | Superman |
| 2014 | "One Day" (featuring Helena) | — | — | — | — | — | — | — | — | — | — | RUS: 5× Platinum | Superman |
| 2014 | "Sex Love Rock n Roll (SLR)" (featuring T-Pain) | — | 68 | — | — | — | — | 52 | — | — | — | | Superman |
| 2016 | "OMG" (featuring Snoop Dogg) | — | — | — | — | — | — | — | — | — | — | | Non-album single |
| 2017 | "Se Fue" (featuring Mohombi) | — | — | — | — | — | — | — | — | — | — | | Non-album single |
| 2017 | "Esmet ChiChie" | — | — | — | — | — | — | — | — | — | — | | Non-album single |
| 2018 | "Dooset Daram" (featuring Helena) | — | — | — | — | — | — | — | — | — | — | | Non-album single |
| 2018 | "Goalie Goalie" (with Nyusha, Pitbull and Blanco) | — | — | — | — | — | — | — | — | — | — | | Non-album single |
| 2019 | "One Night in Dubai" (featuring Helena) | — | — | — | — | — | — | — | — | — | — | | Non-album single |
| 2019 | "Zendegi Bahale" | — | — | — | — | — | — | — | — | — | — | | Non-album single |
| 2020 | "Mary Jane" (versus Ilkay Sencan) | — | — | — | — | — | — | — | — | — | — | | Non-album single |
| 2020 | "Mary Jane" (versus Behzad Leito) | — | — | — | — | — | — | — | — | — | — | | Non-album single |
| 2020 | "No Maybes" (with Ilkay Sencan and Era Istrefi) | — | — | — | — | — | — | — | — | — | — | | Non-album single |
| 2021 | "Lavandia" (with Marshmello) | — | — | — | — | — | — | — | — | — | — | | Non-album single |
| 2021 | "Angels Lullaby" (featuring Helena) | — | — | — | — | — | — | — | — | — | — | | Non-album single |
| 2021 | "Asemoon" | — | — | — | — | — | — | — | — | — | — | | Non-album single |
| 2022 | "Tora Tora (Boro Boro)" (with Giorgos Mazonakis) | — | — | — | — | — | — | — | — | — | — | | Non-album single |
| 2022 | "Bombe" (with Navid Zardi) | — | — | — | — | — | — | — | — | — | — | | Non-album single |
| 2024 | "Belarzoon" | — | — | — | — | — | — | — | — | — | — | | Non-album single |
| 2024 | "Layla" (with Dynoro) | — | — | — | — | — | — | — | — | — | — | | Non-album single |
| 2024 | "I Adore You" (with Hugel and Topic featuring Daecolm) | — | 10 | 12 | — | 87 | — | 8 | 100 | 2 | 69 | ARIA: Platinum; BPI: Gold; BRMA: Platinum; BVMI: Platinum; IFPI AUT: Platinum; IFPI SWI: Platinum; SNEP: Platinum | Non-album single |
| 2025 | "Ukhodi, ukhodi (Boro Boro)" (with JONY) | — | — | — | — | — | — | — | — | — | — | | Non-album single |
| 2025 | "Bi Janbeh" | — | — | — | — | — | — | — | — | — | — | | Non-album single |
| 2025 | "Yalla" (with Mohamed Ramadan and Onative) | — | — | — | — | — | — | — | — | — | — | | Non-album single |
| 2025 | "Halle" | — | — | — | — | — | — | — | — | — | — | | Non-album single |
"—" denotes a recording that did not chart or was not released in that country.

=== As featured artist ===
| Year | Title | Peak chart positions | | | | | Album |
| Year | Title | AUT | DEN | GER | HUN | SWI | Album |
|---|---|---|---|---|---|---|---|
| 2005 | "Music Is My Language" (DJ Aligator feat. Arash) | — | 11 | — | — | — | Arash |
| 2021 | "Ich bin weg (Boro Boro)" (Samra & Topic42 feat. Arash) | 16 | — | 9 | 35 | 12 | Non-album singles |
| 2024 | "Hulu" (Sasy feat. Arash) | — | — | — | — | — | Non-album singles |
| 2025 | "Broken Angel" (Alan Walker & Steve Aoki as Lonely Club featuring Arash) | — | — | — | — | — | Quantum Beats |
"—" denotes a recording that did not chart or was not released in that country.

== Music videos ==
| Year | Title | Director |
|---|---|---|
| 2004 | "Boro Boro" | Alec Cartio |
| 2014 | "One Day" (feat. Helena) | Farbod Khoshtinat (Fred) |
| 2014 | "Iran Iran 2014" | SuperPablo |
| 2014 | "Sex Love Rock n Roll (SLR)" (featuring T-Pain) | Fred |
| 2015 | "Tekoon Bede" | Fred |
| 2016 | "Ba Man Soot Bezan" | Fred (Edit) |
| 2016 | "OMG" (feat. Snoop Dogg) | Fred |
| 2017 | "Se Fue" | Lex Luthor, Fred |
| 2017 | "Esmet ChiChie" | Fred |
| 2018 | "Dooset Daram" | — |
| 2018 | "Goalie Goalie" (with Nyusha, Pitbull and Blanco) | Fred |
| 2019 | "One Night in Dubai" | Roman Burlaca |
| 2020 | "Mary Jane" (versus Ilkay Sencan) | Amin Mardomi |
| 2021 | "Lavandia" (with Marshmello) | Fredrik Callinggard |
| 2021 | "Angels Lullaby" | Michel Miglis |
| 2021 | "Asemoon" | Hossein Booshehri & Mohammad Booshehri |
| 2021 | "Ich bin weg (Boro Boro)" (Samra & Topic42 feat. Arash) | — |
| 2022 | "Tora Tora (Boro Boro)" (with Giorgos Mazonakis) | Yiannis Papadakos |
| 2022 | "Bombe" (with Navid Zardi) | Hossein Booshehri & Mohammad Booshehri |
| 2024 | "Hulu" (Sasy feat. Arash) | L-Shan |
| 2024 | "Belarzoon" | Fred |
| 2025 | "Bi Janbeh" | L-Shan |
| 2025 | "Halle" | Romanov Production, Bigfish Media |
