= Crossfade (The Remix Album) =

Remix album by Arash
- Released: 2006
- Recorded: 2006
- Genres: Persian pop, hip hop, R&B, dance music, house
- Length: 67:36
- Label: Warner Music Scandinavia (WEA)

Arash chronology
Arash (2005)	Crossfade (The Remix Album) (2006)	Donya (2008)

Crossfade (The Remix Album) is the first remix album by Swedish pop singer of Iranian origin Arash. It was released in 2006.

The album peaked at number 24 on the Polish albums chart. Next to sixteen song remixes of his debut album Arash, it features one new and previously unreleased song, called "Iran Iran", which was produced by DJ Aligator and served as the album's only single release.

== Track listing ==
1. "Iran, Iran" (feat. DJ Aligator)
2. "Arash" (Mintman's Reggaton Remix) (feat. Helena)
3. "Tike tike kardi" (DJ Aligator & CS Jay Club Version)
4. "Temptation" (CMN Remix) (feat. Rebecca)
5. "Man o to" (New Version) (feat. Lucia)
6. "Boro, Boro" (Payami Funky Sunday Remix)
7. "Vostochniye skazki" (Russian Version) (Remake of "Temptation") (feat. Blestyashchie)
8. "Arash" (English Version) (feat. Helena)
9. "Tike tike kardi" (Balkan Fanatics Remix)
10. "Baskon" (Farsi No Rap Version)
11. "Ey yar bego" (New Version) (feat. Ebi)
12. "Boro, Boro" (Saba Rock Remix)
13. "Arash" (Payami Vocal Club Mix) (feat. Helena)
14. "Tike tike kardi" (Sodaclub Remix)
15. "Temptation" (Payami Club Mix) (feat. Rebecca)
16. "Boro, Boro" (Indian Version) (feat. Aneela)
17. "Baskon" (Russian Version) (feat. Timbuktu)

== Charts ==
Weekly chart performance for Crossfade (The Remix Album)
Chart (2008)	Peak position
Poland (ZPAV)	24
