= Osadchy =

Osadchy or Osadchyi (Ukrainian: Осадчий) is a Ukrainian surname derived from a historical administrative position related to the organization of peasant settlement on feudal lands. The feminine form is Osadcha (Ukrainian: Осадча) or Osadchaya (Russian: Осадчая). The Belarusian forms are Asadchy (Belarusian: Асадчы) and Asadchaya (Асадчая). Notable people with the surname include:

- Dmytro Osadchyi (disambiguation), several Ukrainian individuals
- Liliya Osadchaya (born 1953), Soviet-Ukrainian volleyball player
- Kateryna Osadcha (born 1983), Ukrainian journalist
- Maksim Osadchy (born 1965), Russian cinematographer
- Mykhaylo Osadchy (1936–1994), Ukrainian writer and dissident
- Natalya Osadcha-Yanata (1891–1982), Ukrainian botanist
- Nikolay Osadchy (born 1957), Russian politician
- Stanislav Osadchiy (born 1961), Russian ambassador
- Yan Osadchyi (born 1994), Ukrainian footballer
