= Slabbert =

Slabbert is a surname of Middle Dutch origin, meaning "herring fisher”. Notable people with the surname include:

- Deon Slabbert (born 2000), South African rugby union player
- Dihan Slabbert (born 1982), South African singer, performer, composer, producer, musician, and songwriter
- Frederik van Zyl Slabbert (1940–2010), South African political analyst, businessman, and politician

== See also ==
- Ex parte Slabbert, an important case in South African insolvency law
