= The Sailor Song =

Single by Toy-Box

from the album Fantastic
- Released: August 25, 1999
- Recorded: 1998
- Length: 3:12
- Label: Playground; Edel; Victor; Mega
- Songwriters: Kasper Manniche; Toy-Box; Golden Child
- Producer: Toy-Box

Toy-Box singles chronology
"Best Friend" (1999)	"The Sailor Song" (1999)	"Superstar" (2001)

Music video
- "The Sailor Song" on YouTube

"The Sailor Song" (accompanied with the slogan "Guaranteed To Make You Feel Good!") is a song by Danish pop duo Toy-Box. It was released in August 1999, by labels Playground, Edel, Victor and Mega Records, as the third single off their debut album, Fantastic (1999). It was co-written and produced by the duo, and even though "The Sailor Song" did not succeed as well as their earlier singles "Tarzan & Jane" and "Best Friend", it was still a widely popular and fan favorite song. It became a top-10 hit in the Netherlands and the accompanying music video was directed by Per Holm-Petersen, who directed the other videos for the duo.

== Track listings ==
1. The Sailor Song – 3:12
2. The Sailor Song (Extended Version) – 4:08
3. The Sailor Song (Bulletproof Remix) – 6:34
4. The Sailor Song (Elephant and Castle Remix) – 5:31

== Other remixes and versions ==
Three other non-album versions of "The Sailor Song" have been confirmed by Toy-Box's official website.

1. The Sailor Song (Radio edit) – 3:05
2. The Sailor Song (Video edit) – 3:24
3. The Sailor Song (Steelo Reggaeton Remix) – 3:05

== Charts ==
=== Weekly charts ===
Weekly chart performance for "The Sailor Song"
Chart (1999)	Peak position
Netherlands (Dutch Top 40)	14
Netherlands (Single Top 100)	9

=== Year-end charts ===
Year-end chart performance for "The Sailor Song"
Chart (1999)	Position
Netherlands (Dutch Top 40)	126
