= Olga Orlova =

Olga Orlova may refer to:

- Olga Orlova (Ukrainian figure skater) (born 1984)
- Olga Orlova (singer) (born 1977), Russian singer, founding member of Blestyashchiye
- Olga Orlova (animator) (1932 - 2022) see Nu, pogodi!
