= Dooset Daram =

Single by Arash featuring Helana
- Released: 26 January 2018
- Label: Warner Music
- Songwriters: Thomas G:Son, Helena Marianne Josefsson, Arash Labaf Alex, Erik Uhlmann Robert

Arash featuring Helana singles chronology
"Se Fue" (2017)	"Dooset Daram" (2018)	"Goalie Goalie" (2018)

Music video
- "Dooset Daram" on YouTube

"Dooset Daram" is a single by Iranian singer Arash, which was released in 2018 by Warner Music. It features Swedish Singer Helena.

== Track listing ==
Digital download
No.	Title	Length
1.	"Dooset Daram" (Radio version)	3:17
2.	"Dooset Daram" (Filatov & Karas remix)	2:58
3.	"Dooset Daram" (Filatov & Karas extended mix)	5:13

== Charts ==
=== Weekly charts ===
Chart (2018)	Peak position
Belarus Airplay (Eurofest)	2
Bulgaria Airplay (Prophon)	2
Russia Airplay (TopHit)	4
Ukraine Airplay (TopHit)	42
Ukraine Airplay (TopHit) Filatov & Karas Remix	13

=== Monthly charts ===
Chart (2018)	Position
Russia Airplay (TopHit)	5
Ukraine Airplay (TopHit)	4

=== Year-end charts ===
Chart (2018)	Position
Russia Airplay (TopHit)	40
Ukraine Airplay (TopHit)	49
