= Fantastic (Toy-Box album) =

FanTastic

Studio album by Toy-Box
- Released: 21 May 1999
- Recorded: 1998–1999
- Studios: Golden Child Studios; New Touch Studio
- Genres: Bubblegum pop; Eurodance
- Length: 42:13
- Label: Edel
- Producers: DeAnn; Golden Child; Soul Poets

Toy-Box chronology
FanTastic (1999)	ToyRide (2001)

Singles from FanTastic
- 1. "Tarzan & Jane" Released: 12 November 1998; 2. "Best Friend" Released: 1999; 3. "The Sailor Song" Released: 25 August 1999

Professional ratings
Review scores
Source	Rating
AllMusic	3/5 stars

Fantastic (stylised as FanTastic) is the debut studio album by Danish bubblegum pop band Toy-Box. It was released by Edel on 21 May 1999. It includes the hit singles "Tarzan & Jane", "Best Friend" and "The Sailor Song", and the promotional single "Teddybear". It also includes the "Toy-Box Space Trap" video game for PC. It spent two weeks at number 1 on the Dutch chart in July of the same year.

The artwork resembles the layout of European PlayStation games.

== Music videos ==
Toy-Box released music videos for "Tarzan & Jane", "Best Friend", "The Sailor Song" and "Teddybear". Most of Toy-Box's videos could be considered cartoonish, while "Teddybear" is a more realistic video. "Tarzan & Jane" featured live monkeys and elephants in a cartoon parody, "Best Friend" features Amir El-Falaki and Anila Mirza having a neon sword fight and turning into little fuzz balls, "The Sailor Song" showed several men flying off a boat, and "Teddybear" is set in Paris and shows El-Falaki and Mirza in a more romantic way than the other videos.

== Commercial performance ==
By early August 1999, the album had reached worldwide sales of 300,000, with 80,000 units sold in Denmark.

== Track listings ==
FanTastic track listing
No.	Title	Length
1.	"Toy-Box Pictures Presents"	0:38
2.	"The Sailor-Song"	3:04
3.	"Best Friend"	3:28
4.	"Tarzan & Jane"	3:04
5.	"E.T."	3:40
6.	"Teddybear"	4:14
7.	"Super-Duper-Man"	3:17
8.	"I Believe in You"	3:29
9.	"Earth, Wind, Water & Fire"	3:36
10.	"What About"	3:40
11.	"Eenie, Meenie, Miney, Mo"	3:17
12.	"A Thing Called Love"	3:16
13.	"Sayonara (Goodbye)"	3:25

Special Christmas Edition bonus track
No.	Title	Length
14.	"So Merry Christmas Everyone"	3:52

Special Limited Edition bonus videos
No.	Title	Length
15.	"Tarzan & Jane"
16.	"Best Friend"
17.	"The Sailor Song"
18.	"Teddybear"
19.	"Behind the Scenes of "Tarzan & Jane""
20.	"Behind the Scenes of "Best Friend""
21.	"On Location Interview"
22.	"Interview"
23.	"Toy-Box in Tivoli"

== Charts ==
Chart performance for Fantastic
Chart (1999)	Peak position
Dutch Albums (Album Top 100)	1
Finnish Albums (Suomen virallinen lista)	28
Norwegian Albums (VG-lista)	9
Swedish Albums (Sverigetopplistan)	17
