= Ksenia Novikova =

Russian singer (born 1980)

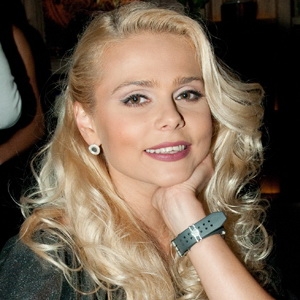
- Born: Ksenia Andreyevna Novikova; May 17, 1980 (age 46); Moscow, RSFSR, USSR
- Occupation: singer
- Years active: 1985–present
- Height: 1.63 m (5 ft 4 in)
- Children: 2
- Website: knovikova.ru

Ksenia Andreyevna Novikova (Russian: Ксе́ния Андре́евна Но́викова; born May 17, 1980) is a Russian singer. She is the soloist of the female pop group Blestyashchiye.

== Biography ==
Ksenia Andreyevna Novikova was born in Moscow. At the age of five she became a soloist of the Loktev's Choir.

== Musical career ==
In August 1999, Ksenia was invited to the group Blestyashchiye in place of the departed Polina Iodis. Before the official participation in the group Ksenia was her back-vocalist. During the entire period of Ksenia's participation, the group recorded four studio albums and one compilation. Composition Olga Orlova, Zhanna Friske, Ksenia Novikova and Irina Lukyanova is still considered the golden composition of the group. In 2006 she appeared on the covers of the magazines Maxim and XXL.

In the middle of 2007 Ksenia left Blestyashchiye, in which she stayed the longest soloist (eight years). In June 2011, four years after leaving, Novikova returned to the group. Since 2012, Ksenia is engaged in solo work. Since 2014 she has been teaching at Moscow University for the Humanities. In May 2018, she returned to the group for the third time.
