= Hi-5 (South African band) =

South African pop band

- Origin: Pretoria, South Africa
- Genres: Pop
- Years active: 2003–2007
- Labels: Select Records, VAT-5
- Members: Refer to "Members" section

Hi-5 is a boy band from Pretoria, South Africa singing mainly in Afrikaans language.

== Formation ==
It was formed in 2003 and took part in the Crescendo annual music contest organized by ATKV (the Afrikaans Language and Culture Association, in Afrikaans, Afrikaanse Taal- en Kultuurvereniging), a major event for Afrikaans music, winning the title for that year. Niel Schoombee was the founding member of this popular boy band.

== Career ==
Hi-5 released a 5-track EP Soebat in 2003 followed by a self-titled album Hi-5 (2004) with their second studio album being Versoeking released in 2006. The first single from the album, the title track "Versoeking", was an Afrikaans language cover of Arash's "Temptation". The popularity of their single and music video helped the band to further cement their success on the South African music charts. Hi-5 are also notable outside their home country South Africa for recording Afrikaans covers of Eurovision Song Contest entries.

In April 2007, Hi-5 had some limited success in Europe on an international contract with the resort, Sonamor in Mallorca, Spain, in addition to showcasing Afrikaans music in other parts of Europe.

== Members ==
The original members comprised:

- Niel Schoombee
- Nicolaas Swart
- Shaun van Staden
- Dihan Slabbert
- JP Moggee

Later line-up comprised:

- Niel Schoombee
- Nicolaas Swart
- Wynand Buitendag
- Lee Scott
- Renee Kruger

== Discography ==
=== Albums and EPs ===
Title and details	Notes
Soebat: Type: EP; Released: 2003; Record label: VAT VYF Musiek / BMG / ATKV	Track list: 1. "Soebat"; 2. "Time After Time"; 3. "Mooier As Mooi"; 4. "Ek Mis Jou So"; 5. "Speel Sy My, Speel Sy Jou"
Hi-5: Type: Studio album; Released: 2004; Record label: VAT VYF Musiek	Track list: 1. "Hi-5 Overture"; 2. "'n Nuwe Wêreld"; 3. "I Don't Wanna Loose You"; 4. "Elke Dag"; 5. "Kinders Van Die Wind"; 6. "Bly Net Vanaand By My"; 7. "Ek Is Nou-Nou Daar"; 8. "Lag"; 9. "Jy Verniel My"; 10. "Kry Jou Ry"; 11. "Ek Wil Graag Wees"; 12. "Ek Sal Jou Liefhê"; 13. Queen Medley; 14. Afrikaanse "Steyn Fourie" Medley; 15. African Medley; 16. Queen Medley (Radio Edit)
Versoeking: Type: Album; Released: 2006; Record label: Select Music	Track list: 1. "Versoeking"; 2. "Daai Liedjie"; 3. "Red Rose"; 4. "Wys Vir My (Die La-La Song)"; 5. "Weer Sê Dit Weer"; 6. "Gee My Meer"; 7. "Jy Is Die Een"; 8. "Die Twist"; 9. "My Kind of Girl"; 10. "Ek Soek Jou Hier By My"; 11. "Vergewe My Weer"; 12. "'n Ewigheid"; 13. "Cliff & Elvis Keurspel"; 14. "Greased Lightning"; 15. "Staan Net Op (Die Burger Plusster Kenwysie)"; 16. "Die Een's Vir Jou (Met Amor Vittone"); 17. "Day-O"

=== Singles ===
- 2003: "Een Hart Een Droom"
- 2003: "Soebat"
- 2004: "Kinders van die Wind"
- 2004: "Time After Time"
- 2005: "Shnappi"
- 2006: "Versoeking"
