= Nadezhda Ruchka =

Russian singer (born 1981)

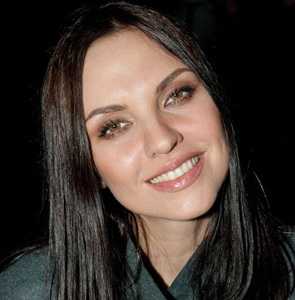
- Nadezhda Ruchka in October 2019

Background information
- Born: Nadezhda Aleksandrovna Ruchka; 16 April 1981 (age 45); Nikopol, Ukrainian SSR, Soviet Union
- Origin: Russian
- Genres: Pop
- Occupations: Singer, songwriter, actress, model, poet
- Years active: 1999–2003 ("Party"); 2004–2017, 2022 ("Blestyashchiye")
- Member of: Blestyashchiye

Nadezhda Aleksandrovna Ruchka (Russian: Надежда Александровна Ручка; also known as Nadia Ruchka) born 16 April 1981) is a Russian singer-songwriter, actress, model, and poet. Soloist of the female pop group "Blestyashchiye".

== Early life and career ==
Nadia Ruchka was born on 16 April 1981 in Nikopol, Ukrainian SSR. Her parents are metallurgists. At the age of five she started taking ballet lessons. At the age of nine she was accepted at Moscow ballet school but her parents were opposed to. Nadia finished mathematics school. When she was studying in eleventh form, she was challenged in Kyiv to a beauty contest. She was also cast in to act in the music video. After winning in the contest, she received $2000. Soon, after graduating school, Nadia moved in Moscow and entered in Moscow State Institute of International Relations. During that period she was working in a modeling agency and took vocal lessons by a lector from Gnessin State Musical College.

In 1999 she became a vocalist of all-female group "Party". She was also an administrator and presenter in Moscow casino at that time. In 2004 Nadia joined the famous Russian girls-band "Blestyashchie" to replace Jeanna Friske. In 2009 she filmed in the comedy movie "Lopuhi: Episode perviy" (Russian: ЛОпуХИ: Эпизод первый). In 2010 Nadia took part in the Russia-1's show "Tanci so zvezdami" (Russian: Танцы со звёздами) with a dancer Eldar Saifutdinov. In 2013 she took part in NTV's show "Ostrov" (Russian: Остров).

In 2015 Nadia released her first book entitled "House of the Soul" in the United States. In 2016 she released her first solo song "S Kem Noviy God vstretish" which was written by producer of group "Blestyashchiye" Andrei Groznyi.

== Personal life ==
Nadia Ruchka had a relationship with a Russian singer Aleksandr Marshal. From 2013 to 2015 she went out with Maksim Osadchy. In 2016 she started to go out with Denis Boyarko. On 17 August 2017 she gave birth a son named Lev.

== Discography ==
=== Blestyashchie's albums ===
- Vostochniye skazki (Oriental Fairytales)
- Odnoklassniki (Schoolmates)
- Best 20
