= Najim (singer) =

Algerian singer

- Born: Najim Amari; 18 January 1985 (age 41)
- Origin: Suresnes, France
- Genres: Raï
- Occupation: Singer
- Instrument: Vocals
- Years active: 2004–present
- Label: EMI/Virgin Music France
- Website: Official Site

Najim Amari, better known by the mononym Najim (Arabic: نجيم) also known as Cheb Najim (الشاب نجيم) (born 18 January 1985, Suresnes, Hauts-de-Seine) is an Algerian raï singer.

== Biography ==
Najim was born in France to an Algerian father and a French mother. Upon his parents' separation, Najim, just 3 months old, moved to Algeria to live with his grandparents in Bordj Bou Arréridj, in east Algeria.

He started in music very young at 6 with his uncles who were accomplished musicians. He performed on many social occasions singing mostly Sétifian music. At 15 he accompanied his uncles on a musical tour that took him to major Algerian cities. He also appeared on shows on Algerian television.

in 2001, the 17-year-old Najim was reunited with his mother for the first time. In 2003, after finishing his studies, he moved permanently to France performing at different night spots in and around Paris. This is how he met Salah Rahoui (in Arabic صالح رحوي), who had written songs for Khaled, Cheba Zahouania, Cheb Sahraoui, Cheb Akil, Gipsy Kings. The resulting independent debut album of Najim in 2004 Kount Enhawes won great accolades and sold 8000 copies. Most of the material appears again in his first official studio album Hasbtak ana.

In 2007, with being signed to Virgin Music France, Najim came back with his second official studio album Saba again produced by Salah Rahoui retro and modern sounds with great help from established names in raï. The album was notable for collaboration including Albi Montana and Larsen. He also found great support when the great diva of rai music Cheikha Rimitti sang a duo with him in the second album in the song "N'rouhou N'zourou".

In 2009, he is featured in a French remake of "Suddenly" a hit of the Swedish-Iranian Arash. Re-titled "Près de toi (Suddenly)", it is a multilingual song in French, English and Persian and contains a sampling of Algerian classic "Abdel Kader" with Arash featuring Najim and Swedish-Mexican star Rebecca Zadig

== Discography ==
=== Albums ===
| Title and details | Notes |
|---|---|
| Kount Enhawes: Type: Album; Released: 2004; Record label: Aladin/WMO; Distribution: Independent | No. / Title / Length; 1. / "Les Algériens" / 6:12; 2. / "Chafitini Omri" / 6:28; 3. / "L'Emigia" / 5:09; 4. / "Kount Enhawes" / 6:42; 5. / "Linagdabha Ya Mma" / 6:21; 6. / "Min Fet El Hal" / 6:32; 7. / "Galbi Manek" / 6:19; 8. / "Ghalta Faïta" / 5:04; 9. / "Gouaâdi Hdaya" / 6:33; 10. / "Jit Nahkilek" / 6:22 |
| Hsabtek ana: Type: Album; Released: 2006; Record label: Distribution: Independent | No. / Title / Length; 1. / "Gouaâdi Hdaya"; 2. / "Chafitini Omri"; 3. / "Fananin Bladi"; 4. / "Galbi Manek"; 5. / "Ghalta Faïta"; 6. / "H'sabtek Ana"; 7. / "Jit Nahkilek"; 8. / "Kount Enhawes"; 9. / "L Emigia"; 10. / "Les Algériens"; 11. / "Linagdabha Ya Mma"; 12. / "Min Fet El Hal"; 13. / "N'rouhou N'zourou"; 14. / "Twahachtek Bezef" |
| Saba: Type: Album; Released: 2007; Record label: EMI/Virgin | No. / Title / Length; 1. / "H'sabtek Ana"; 2. / "N'Rouhou N'Zourou" (feat. Cheikha Rimitti); 3. / "Fananin Bladi"; 4. / "Châal Sabrat"; 5. / "Twahachtek Bezef" (feat. Alibi Montana); 6. / "Raha Walete" (feat. Larsen); 7. / "Rani La Wahdi"; 8. / "Elle Saba"; 9. / "M'Ra Mataghbenhech"; 10. / "Mesjoune"; 11. / "Ya Zarga"; 12. / "Saâdia" |
| Mkhabarni Galbi: Type: Album; Released: 2010; Record label: | No. / Title / Length; 1. / "Près de toi (new version)" (feat. Rebecca); 2. / "Mkhabarni Galbi"; 3. / "Près de toi"; 4. / "Ya Mama" (feat. Kenza Farah); 5. / "Latebkich"; 6. / "Neuilly sa mère"; 7. / "Ila Ntia Nsitini"; 8. / "Fananine Bladi (new version)"; 9. / "Jusqu'au bout du monde"; 10. / "Interlude"; 11. / "Aalich Neflachi"; 12. / "Yallah ya rabi"; 13. / "T'halou fi Wahran"; 14. / "Ain el Karma"; 15. / "Mazelt Nkaraa Fik" |
| Raïvolution: Type: Album; Released: 11 December 2015; Record label: | |

=== Singles ===
- 2004: "Jusqu'au bout du monde" (Willy Denzey & Najim)
- 2009: "Près de toi (Suddenly)" (with Arash and Rebecca) (EMI/Virgin)
- 2011: "Oulach oulach khallouna tranquille"
- 2015: "Je t'aimais, je t'aime, je t'aimerai"
- 2016: "Maman n'est pas ma mère"

=== Appearances / Collaborations ===
- Willy Denzey and Najim – "Jusqu'au bout du monde"
- Najim & Kenza Farah – "Ya mama" (2004)
- Najim feat. Cheikha Rimitti – "N'Rouhou N'Zourou"
- Najim feat. Alibi Montana – "Twahachtek Bezef" (on his album Saba)
- Najim feat. Larsen – "Raha Walete"
- Najim with Arash & Rebecca – "Près de toi (Suddenly)"
- Les Déesses feat. Najim and Caloudji – "Ca c'est bon" (Les Déesses album Saveurs exotiques)
- Isleym feat. Rat Luciano & Najim – "Tu mérites mieux" (in compilation album Rai N B Fever 4) (2011)
- LaCrim feat. Najim – "Beauté fatale" (2013)
- Génération Bataclan – "Je prie pour Paris" (2016)
- DJ Kim feat. Najim – "Majic"

Some of Najim's songs have appeared on various compilations including Raï n'Funk (2006 compilation EMI Music France), on Coupé Décalé Mania, DJ Youcef's Raï A L'ancienne/Raï Nouvelle Génération, on Oran Oujda: Raï express, Arabianight 4 and on Urban raï and Urban raï Volume 2 (a Beur FM release).
