= Giorgos Mazonakis =

Greek singer (1972–2026)

George Mazonakis Γιώργος Μαζωνάκης
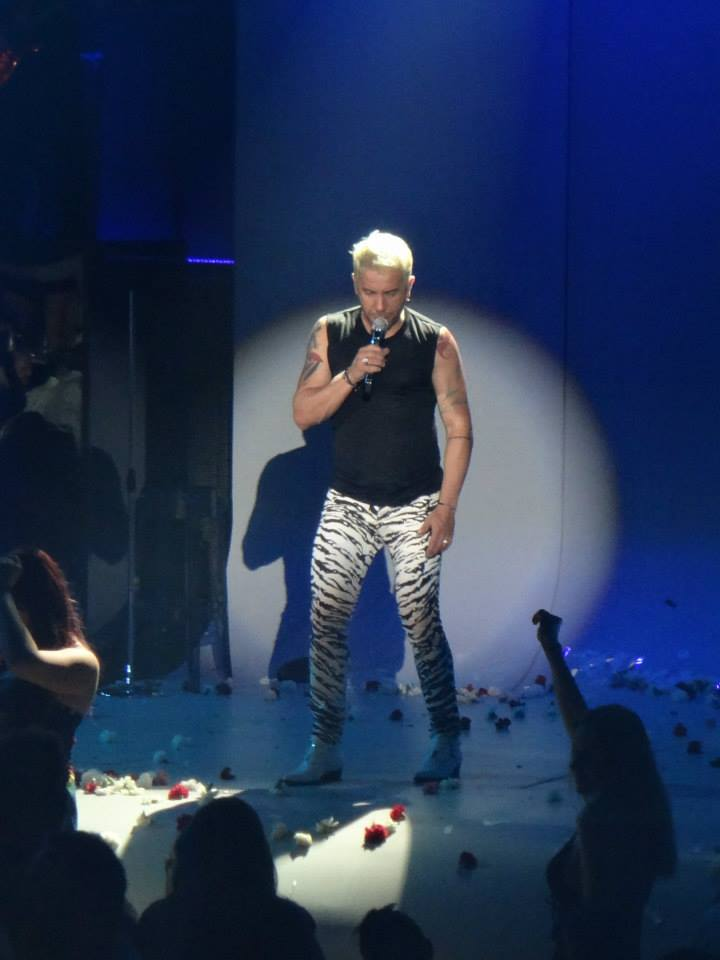
- Mazonakis in 2014

Background information
- Born: 4 March 1972; Nikaia, Attica, Kingdom of Greece
- Died: 9 September 2026 (aged 54) Athens, Greece
- Genres: Greek folk-pop; dance
- Years active: 1993–2026
- Labels: Universal Music Greece (1993‍–‍2001); Heaven Music (2001–2016); Minos EMI (2017–2026)

George Mazonakis (Greek: Γιώργος Μαζωνάκης; 4 March 1972 – 9 September 2026) was a Greek modern folk-pop and pop singer in Greece.

== Life and career ==
George Mazonakis was born and raised in Nikaia, a suburb of Piraeus, Greece. He grew up in a working-class neighbourhood and had family origins in Sitia, Crete. His early musical influences included prominent Greek laïko singers such as Stratos Dionysiou, Yiannis Parios, Marinella and Haris Alexiou, alongside an interest in international music and rock.

Mazonakis developed an interest in singing during his teenage years and began performing professionally in nightclubs while still young. In the summer of 1992, while performing at a nightclub in Patras, he was discovered by executives of PolyGram Greece, who offered him a recording contract. His debut album, "Mesanihta kai Kati", was released in 1993.

He followed this with "Me Ta Matia Na To Les" in 1994, which established him as a rising figure in Greek popular music. The album included songs such as "Aniko Se Mena", "3 To Proi" and "Mi Mou Zitas". In 1996, he released "Mou Leipeis", whose title track became one of his early signature songs.

Throughout his career, Mazonakis made many appearances throughout Greece, Cyprus, Germany, Australia, South Africa and the US.

In 2002, the singer sang two songs of Stamatis Kraounakis on the soundtrack of the film by Nikos Panagiotopoulos titled Varethika Na Skotono tous Agapitikous Sou (I'm tired of killing your boyfriends).

He collaborated with the Greek fashion house Deux Hommes at MadWalk by Vodafone.

Hürriyet, a newspaper in Turkey, chose the nightclub Votanikos and George Mazonakis to represent the nightlife of Athens. Mazonakis completed his appearances at Votanikos in March 2011 and visited Turkey after preparing a collaboration with a Turkish songwriter. He continued collaborating with Turkish songwriters on his album titled Ta Isia Anapoda.

Beyond music, Mazonakis appeared in television programmes and entertainment productions. He served as a judge on "The X Factor Greece" and "Your Face sounds Familiar", and later appeared as a coach on "The Voice of Greece".

== Death ==
Mazonakis died on 9 September 2026, aged 54. after suffering cardiac arrest at a private medical practice in Kolonaki, where he had gone for a scheduled plasmapheresis procedure. He was transported to Elpis Hospital without a pulse and was pronounced dead shortly after arrival.

The circumstandces surrounding his death prompted an investigation into the medical practice and the procedure he had ungergone. Two doctors associated with the clinic were arrested on 10 September on suspicion of criminal responsibility for his death. Investigators examined incosistencies in their accounts of the events and the clinic's handling of the medical emergency.

Reports published during the investigation stated that the doctors had searched ChatGPT for information on how to revive a patient following Mazonakis' collapse. Investigators also reportedly discovered photographs of the unconscious singer on one of the doctor's mobile phones.

The Athens Medical Association subsequently stated that the clinic was not authorised to use the plasmapheresis machine or perform the procedure. Investigators also examined reports that the clinic's client records had been deleted. The two doctors faced criminal charges in connection with Mazonakis' death, while the investigation continued into the circumstances of the procedure and the medical care provided to him.

== Discography ==
=== Studio albums ===
Year	Title	Certification
1993	Mesanihta Kai Kati	—
1994	Me Ta Matia Na To Les	Gold
1996	Mou Leipeis	Gold
1997	Paidi Tis Nihtas	Platinum
1998	Brosta S'Ena Mikrofono	Gold
1999	Allaxane Ta Plana Mou	Gold
2002	Koita Me	Gold
2003	Savvato	Platinum
2007	Ta Ohi Kai Ta Nai Mou	—
2010	Ta Isia Anapoda	2× Platinum
2012	Leipei Pali O Theos	Platinum
2015	To Paraxeno Me Mena	Platinum
2019	Agapo Simeni	—

=== Compilation albums ===
Year	Title	Notes
2001	The Best Of	—
2013	Me Lene Giorgo (20 Years Giorgos Mazonakis)	—

=== Live albums ===
Year	Title	Certification
2004	Mazonakis Live	Gold
2009	Revised	—

=== Singles ===
Year	Title	Peak chart position		Album
Year	Title	GRE (airplay)	GRE (sales)	Album
1996	"Fevgo Gia Mena"	—	—	Mou Leipeis
2001	"Missing You"	—	—	Non-album single
2001	"2x2"	—	—	Non-album single
2003	"Nikotini"	7	—	Savvato
2006	"Summer in Greece"	1	—	Non-album single
2007	"S'Eho Epithimisei"	2	—	Ta Ohi Kai Ta Nai Mou
2010	"I Kardia Mou"	5	—	Ta Isia Anapoda
2010	"Exartisi – Exantlisi (Ta Isia Anapoda)"	7	—	Ta Isia Anapoda
2011	"Min Pas Pouthena"	3	—	Leipei Pali o Theos
2012	"Leipei Pali O Theos"	9	—	Leipei Pali o Theos
2013	"Kalos Sas Vrika"	2	—	Leipei Pali o Theos
2014	"Eho Perasei Kai Heirotera"	2	—	To Paraxeno Me Mena
2014	"Terma"	1	—	To Paraxeno Me Mena
2015	"To Paraxeno Me Mena"	9	—	To Paraxeno Me Mena
2015	"Timima"	13	—	To Paraxeno Me Mena
2016	"De Goustaro"	1	—	Agapo Simeni
2017	"Sopa Ki Akou"	3	—	Agapo Simeni
2018	"Agapo Simeni"	1	—	Agapo Simeni
2018	"Ena Thavma"	1	—	Agapo Simeni
2019	"Dianikterevo"	1	—	Agapo Simeni
2020	"Ores Mikres"	2	—	Agapo Simeni
2021	"Tosa Vradia"	2	—	Agapo Simeni
2022	"Tora Tora (Boro Boro)" (with Arash)	13	15	Non-album single

== Filmography ==
=== Television ===
Year	Title	Role(s)	Notes
1996	Between Us	Himself	Episode: "Parthena 39 years old"
2003	The stables of Erieta Zaimi	Himself	1 episode
2005	MAD Video Music Awards	Himself (performance)	TV special
2007	MAD Video Music Awards	Himself (performance)	TV special
2007	Wonderful Creatures	Himself	Episode: "Higher quality music"
2008	Mad Secret Concert with Giorgos Mazonakis	Himself (host)	TV special
2010	Talk dirty to me	George Aidonis	Episode: "The woman has to be afraid of man"
2011	MadWalk - The Fashion Music Project	Himself (performance)	TV special
2012	MAD Video Music Awards	Himself (performance)	TV special
2013	MadWalk - The Fashion Music Project	Himself (performance)	TV special
2014	MAD Video Music Awards	Himself (performance)	TV special
2017	MadWalk - The Fashion Music Project	Himself (host)	TV special
2017	The X Factor Greece	Himself (judge)	Season 5
2018	MAD Video Music Awards	Himself (performance)	TV special
2019–2020	Your Face Sounds Familiar	Himself (judge)	Season 5-6
2020	At Home with MEGA with Giorgos Mazonakis	Himself (host)	Episode 11; season 2
2020	MadWalk - The Fashion Music Project	Himself (performance)	TV special
2022	MAD Video Music Awards	Himself (performance)	TV special
2022	The Numbers	Himself	Episode: "Miracle"
2024–2025	The Voice of Greece	Himself (coach)	Seasons 10-11
2025	MadWalk - The Fashion Music Project	Himself (performance)	TV special

=== Film ===
Year	Title	Role	Notes	Ref.
1997	The Winner	Himself	Film debut	
2002	I was bored to kill my lovers	Himself		
2022	On the throne of Xerxes	Giorgos		

=== Music videos ===
Year	Song Title	Artist	Notes
1993	Xafnika (Suddenly)	Himself	
1994	Me ta matia na to les (Say it with your eyes)	Himself	
1995	Tipota (Nothing)	Himself	
1996	Teleiosame Edo (We're done now)	Himself	
1996	Mou Leipeis (I miss you)	Himself	
1996	Fevgo gia mena (I leave for myself)	Himself	
1997	To Louketo (Padlock)	Himself	
1997	Paidi tis Nyxtas (Night's Guy)	Himself	
1997	Edo (Here)	Himself	
1999	Eisai ena treno (You're a train)	Himself	
1999	Thelo na gyriso (I want to go back)	Himself feat. Goin' Through	
