= Zadig (disambiguation) =

Zadig is a 1747 novella by Voltaire.

Zadig may also refer to:

- Fylgia Zadig (1921-1994), Swedish actress
- Rebecca Zadig (born 1982), Swedish singer
