= Pure Love (Arash song) =

Single by Arash featuring Helena

from the album Donya
- Released: 2008
- Length: 3:13
- Label: Warner Music
- Songwriters: Arash Labaf Alex, Erik Uhlmann Robert, Bahman Zamini, Ali Zamini Ceazar

Arash featuring Helena singles chronology
"Suddenly" (2008)	"Pure Love" (2008)	"Always" (2009)

Music video
- "Pure Love" on YouTube

"Pure Love" is a single by Iranian–Swedish singer Arash, which was released in 2008 by Warner Music. It features Swedish singer Helena, with Marianne Puglia appearing in the music video.

== Track listing ==
CD single
No.	Title	Length
1.	"Pure Love" (Radio Edit)

Pure Love (feat. Helena) - EP
No.	Title	Length
1.	"Pure Love (Radio Edit)" (Radio Edit)	3:15
2.	"Pure Love (Mary Angel Radio Edit)" (Mary Angel Radio Edit)	4:10
3.	"Pure Love (PJ Harmony Club Mix)" (PJ Harmony Club Mix)	6:55
4.	"Pure Love (Mintman Remix)" (Mintman Remix)	3:10
5.	"Pure Love (Ali Payami Remix)" (Ali Payami Remix)	3:29

== Charts ==
=== Weekly charts ===
Weekly chart performance for "Pure Love"
Chart (2008–09)	Peak position
CIS Airplay (TopHit)	3
Finland (Suomen virallinen lista)	19
Russia Airplay (TopHit)	3

Chart (2024)	Peak position
Kazakhstan Airplay (TopHit)	42

=== Year-end charts ===
2009 year-end chart performance for "Pure Love"
Chart (2009)	Position
CIS (TopHit)	3
Russia Airplay (TopHit)	6

2010 year-end chart performance for "Pure Love"
Chart (2010)	Position
Russia Airplay (TopHit)	120

=== Decade-end charts ===
Decade-end chart performance for "Pure Love"
Chart (2000–2009)	Position
Russia Airplay (TopHit)	59
