= Maksim Osadchy =

Russian cinematographer (born 1965)

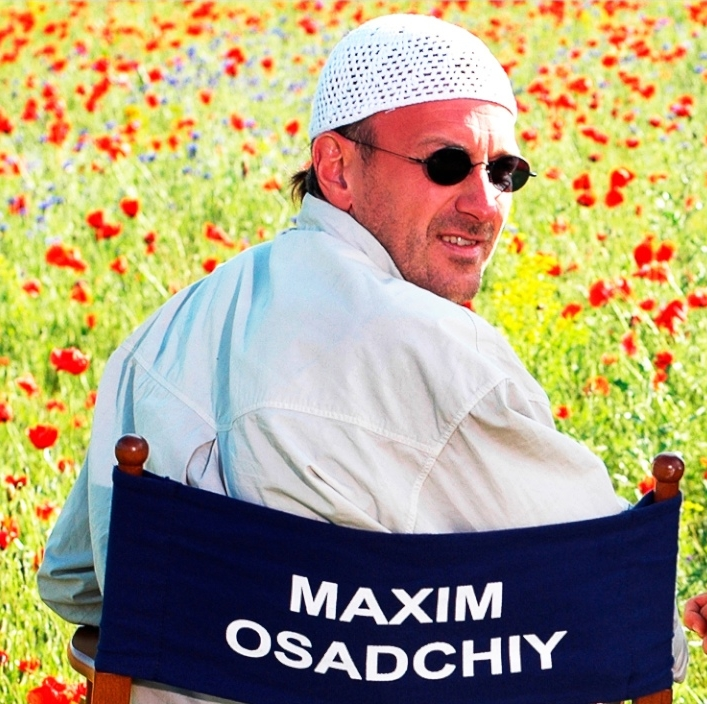
- Born: August 8, 1965 (age 60); Krasnoyarsk, RSFSR, USSR
- Occupations: cinematographer music video director
- Years active: 1988 — present

Maksim Roaldovich Osadchy (Russian: Макси́м Роальдович Оса́дчий; full name Maksim Osadchy-Korytkovsky; born August 8, 1965) is a Russian cinematographer, actor and director of the clips. Winner of the Golden Eagle (2) and Nika Award.

== Biography ==
Maksim was born on August 8, 1965, in Krasnoyarsk. He graduated from VGIK (workshop of Vladimir Nakhabtsev).

He shot commercials of beer, sparkling water, chocolate Nestlé and mobile operators MTS and Beeline. He made music videos for singers: Linda, Valery Leontiev, Philip Kirkorov, Dmitry Malikov, Leonid Agutin, Alla Pugacheva, Valery Meladze, Kirill Turichenko, Smash, Julia Savicheva, Angelica Agurbash and others.

Cooperates with the director Fyodor Bondarchuk.

== Filmography ==
- 1988: Etude of Lighting (short)
- 1989: Markun
- 1990: In the Land of the Sun
- 1991: Sexy Tales
- 1992: Alisa and second-hand bookshop
- 1998: The Unfamiliar Weapon, or the Crusader 2
- 1999: The War of the Princess
- 2000: The President and His Granddaughter
- 2001: Old Songs About the Main Thing. Postscript
- 2005: The 9th Company
- 2006: Heat
- 2006: The Day of Money
- 2006: Breathe in and Out
- 2009: Dark Planet
- 2011: Without Men
- 2011: Two Days
- 2012: Kokoko
- 2013: Stalingrad
- 2013: The Startup
- 2013: Odnoklassniki.ru: OnCLICKy luck
- 2016: The Duelist
- 2016: Versus
- 2017: Guardians
- 2017: Furious
- 2018: Story of One Appointment
- 2019: Goalkeeper of the Galaxy

== Personal life ==
Has one child from marriage to actress Maria Antipova. He was married to actress Elena Korikova and brought up her son. Lived a civil marriage with actress Yuliya Snigir, whom he met on the set of the film The Inhabited Island. He met with the soloist of the group Blestyashchiye Nadezhda Ruchka.
