= Vostochniye skazki =

Studio album by Blestyashchiye
- Released: March 2006 (Russia)
- Language: Russian
- Producers: Andrey Grozniy; Andrey Shlykov

Blestyashchiye chronology
Apel'sinoviy ray (2003)	Vostochniye skazki (2006)	Odnolassniki (2008)

Vostochniye skazki is the sixth studio album by Blestyashchiye.

== Track listing ==
1. "Vostochniye skazki" (Eastern fairytales) (duet with Arash)
2. "Palmy parami" (Palms with couples)
3. "Agent 007" (-)
4. "Hey, allo au" (-)
5. "Kak zvezda" (Like a star)
6. "Poverila" (I believed)
7. "Kapitan dalnego plavaniya"
8. "Operupolnomochenniy"
9. "Naleteli vdrug dozhdi"
10. "Brat moy desantnik"
11. "Novogodnyaya pesnya" (New Year song)
12. "Vengerovv & Fedoroff with Blestyashchiye" (poppuri)
13. "Novogodnyaya pesnya" (remix)
14. "Apel'sinovaya pesnya" (remix)

== Vocals ==
- Kseniya Novikova
- Yulia Kovalchuk
- Anna Semenovich
- Nadezhda Ruchka
