= Toy Ride =

ToyRide

Studio album by Toy-Box
- Released: 28 July 2001
- Recorded: 2000
- Genres: Bubblegum pop; Eurodance
- Length: 39:03
- Label: Edel
- Producer: Steven Keen

Toy-Box chronology
FanTastic (1999)	ToyRide (2001)

Singles from ToyRide
- 1. "www.girl" Released: 28 July 2001; 2. "Superstar" Released: 30 July 2001

ToyRide is the second studio album by Danish bubblegum pop band Toy-Box. It was released by Edel on 28 July 2001. It includes the singles "Superstar", "www.girl", and E-Type's "Russian Lullaby".

The album also includes a 2-sided, 9-piece puzzle of the cover art.

== Track listing ==
No.	Title	Length
1.	"Superstar"	3:07
2.	"Russian Lullaby"	3:17
3.	"www.girl"	3:24
4.	"007"	3:20
5.	"Cowboy Joe"	3:05
6.	"Dumm-Diggy-Dumm"	3:07
7.	"Wizard of Oz"	3:18
8.	"Divided"	3:30
9.	"Prince of Arabia"	3:36
10.	"S.O.S."	2:45
11.	"No Sleep"	3:43
12.	"Finally"	3:06

== Charts ==
Chart (2001)	Peak position
Denmark (Danish Albums Chart)	22
The Netherlands (Dutch Top 40)	91
