= Best Friend (Toy-Box song) =

Single by Toy-Box

from the album FanTastic
- Released: 1999
- Genre: Eurodance
- Length: 3:28
- Label: Edel, Victor, Mega Records
- Songwriters: Golden Child, Toy-Box
- Producer: Toy-Box

Toy-Box singles chronology
"Tarzan & Jane" (1998)	"Best Friend" (1999)	"The Sailor Song" (1999)

Music video
- "Best Friend" on YouTube

"Best Friend" is a song by Danish group Toy-Box from their debut studio album, Fantastic (1999). It was released as the second single from the album in 1999 in Germany.

== Track listing ==
- UK & Europe CD single
1. "Best Friend" (Radio Version) – 3:28
2. "Best Friend" (Maxi Version) – 4:11
- Scandinavia CD maxi-single, promo
1. "Best Friend" (Kaydee Vs. DJ NME) – 6:48
2. "Best Friend" (Hampenberg Club Edit) – 5:25
3. "Best Friend" (Elephant & Castle Mix) – 5:05
4. "Best Friend" (The Poker Boys Toy-Mix Long Version) – 6:28
- Australia CD maxi-single
1. "Best Friend" (Radio Version) – 3:28
2. "Best Friend" (Maxi Version) – 4:11
3. "Best Friend" (The Poker Boys Toy-Mix Long Version) – 6:28
4. "Best Friend" (The Poker Boys Toy-Mix Short Version) – 3:12
5. "Best Friend" (Elephant & Castle Mix) – 5:05
- Germany CD maxi-single
1. "Best Friend" (Radio Version) – 3:28
2. "Best Friend" (The Poker Boys Toy-Mix Long Version) – 6:28
3. "Best Friend" (Elephant & Castle Mix) – 5:05
- UK Cassette, single
1. "Best Friend" (Radio Version) – 3:28
2. "Best Friend" (The Poker Boys Toy-Mix Long Version) – 6:28
3. "Best Friend" (Radio Version) – 3:28
4. "Best Friend" (The Poker Boys Toy-Mix Long Version) – 6:28

== Charts ==
=== Weekly charts ===
Chart (1999)	Peak position
Australia (ARIA)	39
Denmark (Tracklisten)	6
Europe (Eurochart Hot 100)	37
Europe (Eurochart Hot 100)	11
Netherlands (Dutch Top 40)	1
Netherlands (Single Top 100)	1
Norway (VG-lista)	13
Sweden (Sverigetopplistan)	23
UK Singles (OCC)	41

=== Year-end charts ===
Chart (1999)	Position
Netherlands (Dutch Top 40)	13
Netherlands (Single Top 100)	26
