= Dmytro Osadchyi =

Dmytro Osadchyi may refer to:

- Dmytro Anatoliyovych Osadchyi (born 1992), Ukrainian football midfielder
- Dmytro Serhiyovych Osadchyi (born 1992), Ukrainian football midfielder for Ahva Arraba
