= Donya (album) =

Studio album by Arash
- Released: 2008
- Recorded: 2008
- Genres: Persian pop, hip hop, R&B, reggaeton, dance music, house
- Length: 42:32
- Label: Warner Music Scandinavia (WEA)

Arash chronology
Crossfade (The Remix Album) (2006)	Donya (2008)	Superman (2014)

Donya (Persian: دنیا) is the second studio album by Iranian-Swedish pop singer Arash. It was released in 2008.

Singles from this album were "Chori Chori", "Suddenly", "Kandi", "Donya", "Dasa Bala" and "Pure Love".

== Track listing ==
1. "Intro"
2. "Donya" (feat. Shaggy)
3. "Suddenly" (feat. Rebecca)
4. "Miduni Midunam"
5. "Kandi" (feat. Lumidee)
6. "Pure Love" (feat. Helena)
7. "Naro"
8. "Chori, Chori" (feat. Aneela)
9. "Laf, Laf"
10. "Joone Man"
11. "Tanham"
12. "Doset Nadaram"
13. "Dasa Bala" (feat. Timbuktu, Aylar & Yag)
14. "Donya" (Payami Break Mix) (feat. Shaggy)

== Charts ==
Weekly chart performance for Donya
Chart (2008)	Peak position
Sweden (Sverigetopplistan)	48
Poland (ZPAV)	23

== Certifications ==
Certifications and sales for Donya
Region	Certification	Certified units/sales
Poland (ZPAV)	Gold	10,000^{*}
^{*} Sales figures based on certification alone.
