= Arash (album) =

Studio album by Arash
- Released: 3 March 2005
- Recorded: 2004–2005
- Genres: Persian pop, hip hop, R&B, dance music, house
- Length: 50:17
- Label: Warner Music Scandinavia (WEA)

Arash chronology
| Arash (2005) | Crossfade (The Remix Album) (2006) |

Arash is the debut studio album by Iranian-Swedish singer Arash (full name Arash Labaf). It was released in 2005.

The singles from the album include "Temptation", "Boro Boro", "Arash", "Bombay Dreams" and "Music Is My Language".

== Track listing ==
1. "Tike Tike Kardi"
2. "Yalla"
3. "Boro Boro"
4. "Ey Yar Begoo" (feat. Ebi)
5. "Temptation" (feat. Rebecca)
6. "Arash" (feat. Helena)
7. "Bombay Dreams" (feat. Aneela & Rebecca)
8. "Man o To"
9. "Baskon" (feat. Timbuktu)
10. "Music Is My Language" (feat. DJ Aligator)
11. "Salamati"
12. "Behnaz"
13. "Boro, Boro" (Bollywood Café Mix)
14. "Tike Tike Kardi" (Payami Lounge Mix)

== Charts ==
Weekly chart performance for Arash
| Chart (2005) | Peak position |
|---|---|
| Czech Albums (ČNS IFPI) | 3 |
| Greek Foreign Albums (IFPI) | 3 |
| Hungarian Albums (MAHASZ) | 6 |
| Swedish Albums (Sverigetopplistan) | 17 |
| Swiss Albums (Swiss Hitparade) | 36 |
