= Dmytro Osadchyi (footballer, born March 1992) =

Ukrainian footballer

Personal information
- Full name: Dmytro Anatoliyovych Osadchyi
- Date of birth: 20 March 1992 (age 34)
- Place of birth: Zaporizhzhia, Ukraine
- Height: 1.70 m (5 ft 7 in)
- Position: Midfielder

Team information
- Current team: Nyva-V Vinnytsia

Youth career
- 2005–2009: FC Metalurh Zaporizhzhia

Senior career*
Years	Team	Apps	(Gls)
2009–2013	Metalurh Zaporizhzhia	0	(0)
2009–2011	→ Metalurh-2 Zaporizhzhia	49	(2)
2013	Olimpik Donetsk	1	(0)
2014	Kremin Kremenchuk	6	(0)
2014–2015	FC Tavriya-Skif Rozdol (Amateur)	17	(2)
2015–2016	Bukovyna Chernivtsi	30	(3)
2017–2018	Nyva-V Vinnytsia	32	(4)

International career
2007–2008	Ukraine-16	7	(0)
- * Club domestic league appearances and goals

Dmytro Osadchyi (Ukrainian: Дмитро Анатолійович Осадчий; born 20 March 1992) is a Ukrainian former football midfielder.

== Career ==
Osadchyi is product of youth team system FC Metalurh Zaporizhzhia.

He played in the Ukrainian Second League (FC Metalurh-2 Zaporizhzhia, FC Kremin Kremenchuk) and in the Ukrainian First League (FC Olimpik Donetsk clubs.
