= Ex parte Slabbert =

South African legal case

In Ex parte Slabbert, an important case in South African insolvency law, the applicant applied for surrender of an estate. In the application, it appeared that the copy of the notice of surrender, required by section 4 of the Insolvency Act, had stated that the applicant's statement of affairs would lie for inspection with the Master for a period of fourteen days from April 26. The date in the notice, however, was the 29th. In other words, there was a discrepancy with regard to the dates.

Because it was difficult to see how actual prejudice could occur in the circumstances, and still more difficult to see how it could have actually occurred, the court held that the application should be granted; in other words, that the defect did not invalidate the application.

== See also ==
- South African insolvency law
