= Natalya Osadcha-Yanata =

Ukrainian botanist and folklorist (1891-1982)

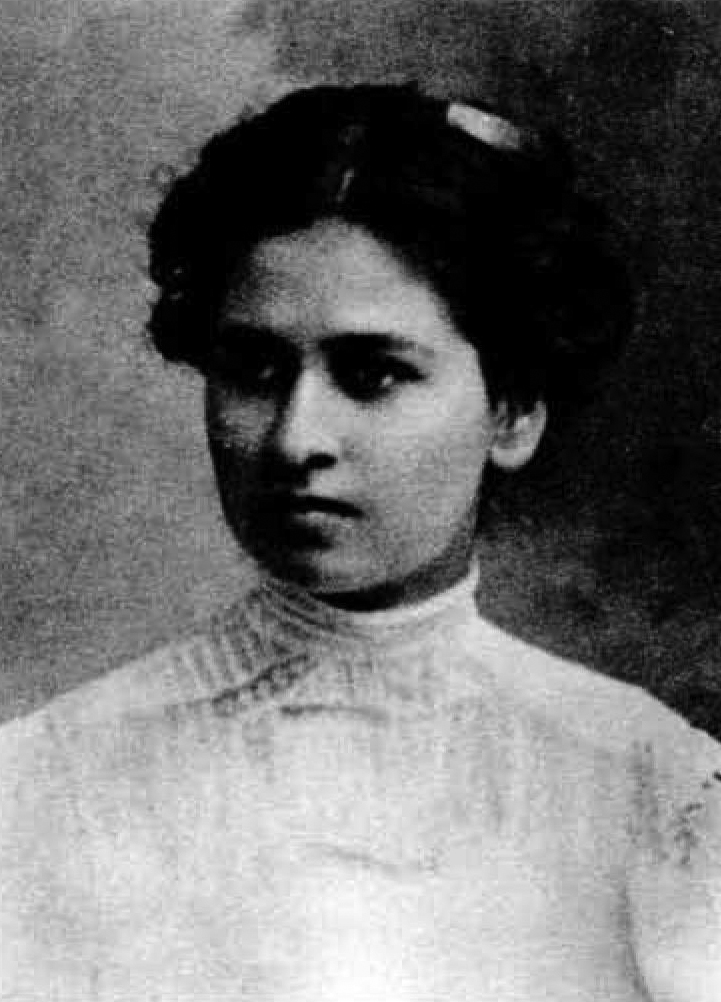
Natalya Tikhonovna Osadcha-Yanata

Natalia Tykhonivna Osadcha-Yanata (Ukrainian: Наталія Тихонівна Осадча-Яната; May 19, 1891, Kherson – April 9, 1982, New York) was a Ukrainian botanist and folklorist noted for studying the medicinal plants of Ukraine and publishing some of her works in English. She was married to Ukrainian botanist Alexander Yanata.

She worked in the Natural History Museum of the Tavriya Provincial Zemstvo, conducted floristic research in the Simferopol district, and made botanical analyzes of grain contamination. She was an employee of the botanical section of the Crimean Society of Naturalists, conducted practical work on plant anatomy for school teachers.

In 1920, she was in charge of the Koreiz People's House and its library, and participated in the founding and activities of the Ukrainian circle at the People's House. In 1921, she returned to Kyiv and continued her work at the Ukrainian Scientific Society as a specialist in the botanical subsection of the natural science section of the Terminology Commission, and when the Society became part of the All-Ukrainian University of Science, she worked at the Institute of the Ukrainian Scientific Language. In 1926–1941, she worked at the Institutes of Applied Botany, Experimental Medicine, and the Ukrainian Chemical and Pharmaceutical Institute.

== Works ==
- Ossadcha-Janata, Natalia (1952). Herbs used in Ukrainian folk medicine. Research Program on the U.S.S.R. and the New York Botanical Garden. OCLC 496268511.
- Ossadcha-Janata, Natalia (1973). Ukraïns'ki narodni nazvy roslyn. Zibrav avtor na Ukraïni v rokakh 1927-1939. (Plant Names in Ukrainian Folk Language) (in Ukrainian). Ukraïns'ka vil'na akademii︠a︡ nauk u SShA. OCLC 461470782.
