= Dihan Slabbert =

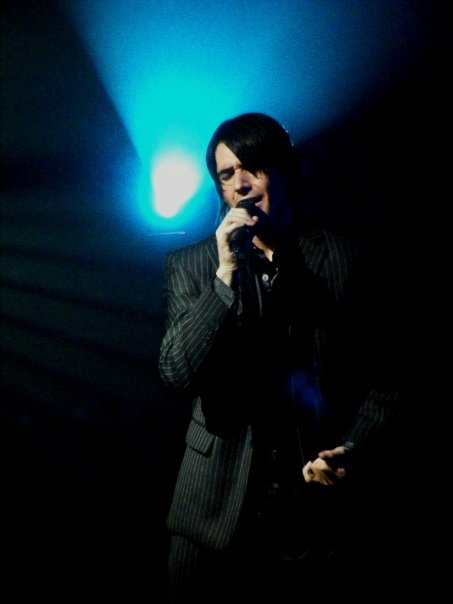
- Dihan Slabbert at the Performer Theatre 2008

Background information
- Also known as: Dihan
- Born: Dihan Slabbert; 3 June 1982 (age 44)
- Origin: Pretoria, South Africa
- Occupations: Singer, performer, composer
- Instruments: Piano, accordion
- Years active: 2000–present
- Formerly of: Hi-5

Dihan Slabbert (born 3 June 1982), is a South African singer, performer, composer, producer, musician, and songwriter. He is best known as one of the lead vocalists in the South African pop group, Hi-5.

== Career ==
Dihan sang at an early age, as a member of the Northern Gauteng Youth Choir. In 2000, he wrote, produced and staged his first musical production, appropriately named, "Debut." He graduated from the University of Pretoria with a Bcom in Tourism Management.

In 2003, competing against 120 young men, he was selected to become a member of boy-band Hi-5. During his years performing and touring with the group, he received several awards, including the ATKV Crescendo songwriting contest, Africa Vision, the Geraas award for best music video ("Kinders van die Wind"), as well as two Naledi Theatre Award nominations for the sold-out run of Oh Boy! at the Sound Stage Theatre. He recorded the Blue Bulls' new anthem "Een Hart Een Droom" as a single, and sang it in their home stadium. His "Time After Time", hit the number one spot on Highveld Stereo, a popular Johannesburg radio station. He was a guest artist in Nataniël and Friends at the Royal Albert Hall in London.

He has worked with South African music industry's high profile artists, including performer Nataniël, director Richard Loring, and choreographer-director Tyrone Watkins. In 2005, he recorded "Songbird" as a duet with Nataniël.

The launch of Dihan's solo career was in 2006. His second self-produced one-man show, Prinz. was presented in English and Afrikaans. He released his first solo single and CD, The Lava Song, a quartet of ballads, including "Silwermaan", in which he showcases his own piano rendition of Beethoven's "Moonlight Sonata".

Dihan made guest appearances on South African TV programs such as Backstage, 7de Laan, Free Talk, Geraas, Kwela, Fiesta and Saterdagnag Laat.

Dihan was lead vocalist and performer in several of Tyrone Watkins' musical productions, including Out Of This World, Let's Party and Bollywood Blitz. He starred in the 80's Sensation at The Performer Theatre in Pretoria. He is currently a member of the pop-classical male vocal group, "Il Quinto."

== Discography ==
=== Singles ===
- "Een Hart Een Droom", Hi-5 (2003)
- "Soebat", Hi-5 (2003)
- "Kinders van die Wind", Hi-5 (2004)
- "Time After Time", Hi-5 (2004)
- "Shnappi", Hi-5 (2005)
- "The Lava Song" (2006)

=== Albums ===
- Hi-5, self-titled (2004)
- The Lava Song (2006)

=== Compilations ===
- Accapêlle, various artists (2005)
- Fashion, Nataniël (2005)
- Die Crescendo-Supersterre, various artists (2006)
- God Bless the Child, various artists (2007)

=== DVDs ===
- Live at The Centurion Theatre, Rina Hugo (2005)
- By Birth, Nataniël (2006)

=== Music Videos ===
- "Kinders van die Wind", Hi-5
- "Time After Time", Hi-5

== Theatre productions ==
- Debut, solo production (2000)
- Oh-Boy! (2004)
- Afrikiti (2005)
- Accapêlle (2005)
- The Moses Machine, with Nataniël and Kyle Grant (2006)
- Prinz, solo production (2006)
- Out of this World (2006)
- Bollywood Blitz (2006)
- Let's Party (2007)
- Houtkruis die Musical (2008)
- 80's Sensation (2008)
