= Goalie Goalie =

Single by Arash, Nyusha, Pitbull, Blanco
- Released: 14 June 2018
- Genre: Pop-folk, hip hop music, World music
- Label: PowerHouse Records
- Songwriters: Mohombi; Cederic Lorrain; Blanco "The Ear"; Armando Christian Pérez; Alexandru Cotoi; Andrei Ropcea; Cezar Cazano

Arash singles chronology
"Dooset Daram" (2018)	"Goalie Goalie" (2018)	"One Night in Dubai" (2019)

Nyusha singles chronology
"Ночь (Night)" (2018)	"Goalie Goalie" (2018)	"Таю" (2019)

Pitbull singles chronology
"Move to Miami" (2018)	"Goalie Goalie" (2018)	"Amore" (2018)

Music video
- "Goalie Goalie" on YouTube

"Goalie Goalie" (stylized as Goalie Goalie! and Goalie Goalie 2018!) is a 2018 PowerHouse Records release featuring an international line-up of singers and artists, the Iranian Swedish artist Arash, the Russian singer Nyusha, Cuban-American rapper Pitbull and rising American record producer Blanco Brown on the occasion of the 2018 FIFA World Cup.

== Background ==
The song is credited on iTunes as Arash featuring Nyusha, Pitbull & Blanco. Released on 14 June 2018 to coincide with the launch of the World Cup in Russia, it was featured during the games' opening event in Moscow.

The song was co-written by Mohombi, Cederic Lorrain, Brown, Pitbull, Alexandru Cotoi, Andrei Ropcea and Cezar Cazano and produced by Alexandru Cotoi with Andrei Ropcea and Brown as co-producers. It was published by PowerHouse Publishing, Sony Atv / Abuelo y Tia songs.

== Music video ==
A music video was also released by Artist Preserve London and Damian Fyffe Productions. The music video was directed by Farbod Koshtinat with Kasra Pezeshki as executive producer and Carlos Veron as director of photography.
