= Boro Boro =

2004 debut single by Arash

Single by Arash

from the album Arash
- Released: 5 July 2004
- Recorded: 2004
- Genre: Persian pop, Worldbeat, Hiphop
- Label: Warner
- Songwriter: Arash Labaf: Robert Uhlmann

Arash singles chronology
"Boro Boro" (2004)	"Tike Tike Kardi" (2005)

"Boro Boro" is the debut single by Iranian–Swedish singer Arash, released in 2004 by Warner Music. The song has peaked at number 1 on the Swedish singles chart. The song starts with the same tiny snipped melody from the Jay Sean song "Eyes on You" which was released two weeks earlier. An alternate version of the song was featured in the 2005 Bollywood film Bluffmaster!.

== Track listing ==
CD single
No.	Title	Length
1.	"Boro Boro" (Radio Edit)	3:13
2.	"Boro Boro" (Extended)	5:14

CD maxi-single
No.	Title	Length
1.	"Boro Boro" (Radio Edit)	3:13
2.	"Boro Boro" (Extended)	5:14
3.	"Boro Boro" (Go Go Remix)	3:57
4.	"Boro Boro" (Funky Sunday)	4:17
5.	"Boro Boro" (Bollywood Café)	3:17
6.	"Boro Boro" (Smooth Summer)	3:08

== Charts ==
=== Weekly charts ===
Chart (2004–05)	Peak position
Austria (Ö3 Austria Top 40)	22
CIS Airplay (TopHit)	2
Czech Republic (IFPI)	1
Finland (Suomen virallinen lista)	12
Germany (GfK)	11
Hungary (Rádiós Top 40)	2
Hungary (Single Top 40)	3
Netherlands (Dutch Top 40 Tipparade)	15
Russia Airplay (TopHit)	3
Sweden (Sverigetopplistan)	1
Switzerland (Schweizer Hitparade)	8

=== Year-end charts ===
Chart (2004)	Position
CIS (Tophit)	101
Russia Airplay (TopHit)	37
Sweden (Sverigetopplistan)	14
Chart (2005)	Position
CIS (Tophit)	89
Germany (Official German Charts)	85
Russia Airplay (TopHit)	86
Switzerland (Schweizer Hitparade)	28

== Certifications ==
Region	Certification	Certified units/sales
Sweden (GLF)	Gold	10,000^{^}
^{^} Shipments figures based on certification alone.

== Ich bin weg (Boro Boro) ==
"Ich bin weg (Boro Boro)"

Single by Samra & Topic42 feat. Arash
- Released: 24 September 2021
- Label: Cataleya Edition

Samra singles chronology
"Lila" (2021)	"Ich bin weg (Boro Boro)" (2021)

Topic42 singles chronology
"Drive" (2021)	"Ich bin weg (Boro Boro)" (2021)

On 24 September 2021 single "Ich bin weg (Boro Boro)" by German rapper Samra and German musician Topic42 featuring Arash was released by Cataleya Edition.

=== Track listing ===
24 September 2021
No.	Title	Length
1.	"Ich bin weg [BoroBoro]"	2:44

=== Charts ===
Weekly chart performance for "Ich bin weg (Boro Boro)"
Chart (2021)	Peak position
Austria (Ö3 Austria)	16
Germany (Offizielle Deutsche Charts)	9
Hungary (Single Top 40)	35
Switzerland (Swiss Hitparade)	12

== Tora Tora (Boro Boro) ==
"Tora Tora (Boro Boro)"

Single by Giorgos Mazonakis and Arash
- Released: 9 June 2022
- Length: 2:48
- Label: Minos EMI
- Songwriters: Michalis Kouinelis: Arash Labaf; Tobias Topic; Robert Uhlmann

Giorgos Mazonakis singles chronology
"Tosa Vradia" (2021)	"Tora Tora (Boro Boro)" (2022)

On 9 June 2022, the single "Tora Tora (Boro Boro)" by Greek singer Giorgos Mazonakis and Arash was released by Minos EMI.

=== Charts ===
Chart (2022)	Peak position
Greece Local (IFPI)	13

== Ukhodi, ukhodi (Boro Boro) ==
On 25 April 2025 a new version of the song called "Ukhodi, ukhodi" (Уходи, уходи) was released, supplemented with new Russian-language verses by singer Jony.

=== Charts ===
Chart performance for "Ukhodi, ukhodi (Boro Boro)"
Chart (2025)	Peak position
Belarus Airplay (TopHit)	78
Kazakhstan Airplay (TopHit)	13
Moldova Airplay (TopHit)	5
Russia Airplay (TopHit)	15
Russia Streaming (TopHit)	15
