= Oi stavloi tis Erietas Zaimi =

- Genre: Comedy; Social; Satire
- Created by: Alexandros Rigas; Dimitris Apostolou
- Directed by: Alexandros Rigas
- Starring: Nikos Sergianopoulos; Mirka Papakonstantinou; Fay Kokkinopoulou; Tzesy Papoutsi; Giannis Mpostantzoglou
- Opening theme: "There is no one like me" by Vlasis Mponatsos
- Country of origin: Greece
- Original language: Greek
- No. of seasons: 2
- No. of episodes: 36

Production
- Production locations: Athens, Greece
- Running time: 45-55 minutes
- Production company: Ena Productions

Original release
- Network: ANT1
- Release: Invalid date range

Oi stavloi tis Erietas Zaimi (English: The stables of Erieta Zaimi) is a Greek comedy television series, produced from 2002 to 2004, created by Alexandros Rigas and Dimitris Apostolou and broadcast on ANT1.

== Plot ==
The extremely wealthy and eccentric Ntimis Tsimiskis Hoffman, son of Erieta Zaimi, donates his mother's last residence, the famous "Stavlos" in Kalamos. The state decides to turn them into a model women's prison, under the supervision of Dimitris Pavlatos, who has just returned from Paris and the management of Roxani Ntanou-Kouloumpi, who, together with her secret liaison, the chief prison guard Chronis Mpatsinilas, illegally empty the food warehouses. Aris Zafolias, who poses as Hoffman's advisor, is in fact a lawyer, with orders to catch Danou red-handed. A few days after the arrival of the first prisoners, Pavlatos also arrives at Stavlos, who constitutes an obstacle to Roxani's plans, as he gives great freedom to the prisoners by ending their isolation.

A few days later, a new group of prisoners arrives at the prison at night, from which one escapes and intends to escape, Melita Michail. Later, a strong love develops between Michael and Pavlatos, which reaches its peak at the end of the season, as they escape together, leaving everyone else to believe that they are dead, except for the three people who knew about their love: Aris Zafolias, now deputy director, the prisoner Foto Bartzoka who will be their future maid of honor, and the prisoner Frantzeska Salieri. Danou wanders among the prisoners, but when her schemes are exposed, she is imprisoned. Pavlatos and Michael try to find shelter to escape from the police who are looking for them, and eventually return to prison, where they get married. In order to forget the story for a while, it is proposed to stage a play in the prison. A complaint refutes Michael's testimony that she held him captive for so many months and Dimitris Pavlatos should be arrested.

In the end, the police are convinced to let him first perform in the play and then arrest him. However, they do not know that all the prisoners, with the help of President Hoffman and Director Zafolia, intend to escape. In the last episode, alongside the play, the prisoners' collective effort to escape is presented, which they eventually succeed in. And so everyone has the opportunity to restart their lives from where they left off.

== Cast ==
- Nikos Sergianopoulos as Dimitris "Mitsos" Pavlatos
- Mirka Papakonstantinou as Roxani Ntanou-Kouloumpi
- Fay Kokkinopoulou as Melita Michail
- Tzesy Papoutsi as Pavlina Kakoudaki
- Giannis Mpostantzoglou as Chronis Mpatsinilas
- Chrysoula Diavati as Foto Mpartzoka
- Maria Lekaki as Kaiti Kolesidou-Gkioulmpampa
- Pinelopi Pitsouli as Manolia Mpournova
- Maria Kanellopoulou as Roula Koromila
- Konstantia Christoforidou as Lilika Kalitsi
- Maria Filippou as Ellada Oikonomou
- Sara Ganoti as Mairi Skarmoutsou
- Veta Mpetini as Choulia Osman
- Alexandros Rigas as Aris Zafolias
- Vasiliki Deliou as Smaroula Koliatsou
- Tzina Alimonou as Frantzeska Salieri
- Aggelos Papadimitriou as Ntimis Tsimiskis-Hoffman
- Georgia Kallergi as Zouzou Ntalame
- Christina Papamichou as Marinella Vazaka
- Theodosis Kotsis as Teo Talamagkas
- Peny Stathaki as Eleni Giannopoulou
- Viky Protogeraki as Pigi Mpakola
- Pantelis Kanarakis as Kanellos Katsifaras
- Sofia Moutidou as Stella Priovolou
- Fani Panagiotidou as Loukia Karatza
- Konstantinos Katselis as Konstantinos
