= Tarzan & Jane (song) =

Single by Toy-Box

from the album Fantastic
- Released: November 12, 1998
- Recorded: 1998
- Genre: Europop
- Length: 2:59
- Label: Edel; Victor; Mega Records
- Songwriters: Per Holm; Toy-Box
- Producer: Per Holm

Toy-Box singles chronology
"Tarzan & Jane" (1998)	"Best Friend" (1999)

Music video
- "Tarzan & Jane" on YouTube

"Tarzan & Jane" is a song by Danish group Toy-Box from their debut album, Fantastic (1999). It is written by the group with its producer Per Holm and released as the lead single in 1998 in Germany and then re-released in 1999 to coincide with the premiere of Disney's Tarzan. The song became a top-10 hit in Denmark, the Netherlands, Norway, and Sweden. On the Eurochart Hot 100, "Tarzan & Jane" reached number 15. Outside Europe, it peaked at numbers 27 and 41 in New Zealand and Australia, respectively. The accompanying music video was directed by Per Holm-Petersen, depicting group members Amir El-Falaki and Anila Mirza as Tarzan and Jane in the jungle.

== Critical reception ==
AllMusic editor Heather Phares described "Tarzan & Jane" as a "youthful, catchy song". Chuck Taylor from Billboard magazine named it an "ultra-kitschy track". He noted further that the formula here is "identical [to Aqua's 'Barbie Girl']: a husky, accented male vocal accompanied by a sweet, girly-girl chorus. The story this time is obvious enough, describing the jungle passion between Tarzan and Jane, accented by chimpanzee chuckles and our hero's signature swinging-through-the-trees cry."

Pan-European magazine Music & Media wrote that it is "one of the silliest songs to come along in quite some time, this nonetheless incredibly catchy slice of Europop was very successful in the Danish duo's home country, and is now sweeping across most of continental Europe. It could be argued that artists such as Steps, Dr. Bombay and Aqua—who enjoy such mass appeal—have created a general environment where fresh, energetic, lightweight pop can flourish."

== Track listing ==
- German CD single
1. "Tarzan & Jane" (Single Version) – 2:59
2. "Tarzan & Jane" (Maxi Version) – 4:07
- UK & Europe CD Maxi-Single
1. "Tarzan & Jane" (Single Version) – 2:59
2. "Tarzan & Jane" (Maxi Version) – 4:07
3. "Tarzan & Jane" (Club Version) – 4:10
- US CD Maxi-Single
1. "Tarzan & Jane" (Single Version) – 2:59
2. "Tarzan & Jane" (Maxi Version) – 4:07
3. "Tarzan & Jane" (Club Version) – 4:10
- German 12" Vinyl
1. "Tarzan & Jane" (Single Version) – 2:59
2. "Tarzan & Jane" (Maxi Version) – 4:07
3. "Tarzan & Jane" (Club Version) – 4:10

== Charts ==
=== Weekly charts ===
Chart (1999)	Peak position
Australia (ARIA)	41
Austria (Ö3 Austria Top 40)	28
Belgium (Ultratip Bubbling Under Flanders)	2
Belgium (Ultratip Bubbling Under Wallonia)	4
Denmark (Tracklisten)	2
Europe (Eurochart Hot 100)	15
Finland (Suomen virallinen lista)	13
Germany (GfK)	37
Netherlands (Dutch Top 40)	2
Netherlands (Single Top 100)	2
New Zealand (Recorded Music NZ)	27
Norway (VG-lista)	3
Sweden (Sverigetopplistan)	8
Switzerland (Schweizer Hitparade)	34

=== Year-end charts ===
Chart (1999)	Position
Netherlands (Dutch Top 40)	5
Netherlands (Single Top 100)	8
Sweden (Sverigetopplistan)	38

=== Decade-end charts ===
Chart (1990–1999)	Rank
Netherlands (Dutch Top 40)	28

== Certifications ==
Region	Certification	Certified units/sales
Denmark (IFPI Danmark)	Gold	45,000^{‡}
Netherlands (NVPI)	Platinum	75,000^{^}
Sweden (GLF)	Gold	15,000^{^}
^{^} Shipments figures based on certification alone.^{‡} Sales+streaming figures based on certification alone.
