= Temptation (Arash song) =

2005 single by Arash

Single by Arash featuring Rebecca

from the album Arash
- Released: June 15, 2005
- Recorded: 2004
- Genre: Pop
- Length: 3:37
- Label: Warner Music
- Songwriters: Robert Uhlmann; Arash Labaf; Johan Bejerholm; Max Tavahen; Charles Burbank; Ronny Gold; Samy Goz; Pedro Maza Luaces
- Producers: Robert Uhlmann; Alex Arash Labaf; Johan Bejerholm

Arash featuring Rebecca singles chronology
"Tike Tike Kardi" (2005)	"Temptation" (2005)	"Music Is My Language" (2005)

Music video
- "Temptation" on YouTube

"Temptation" is a 2005 major hit single by Iranian singer Arash featuring Rebecca Zadig and taken from Arash' debut album Arash. The music for "Temptation" is from "Baila Maria", a Spanish tune recorded by Ishtar Alabina featuring Los Niños de Sara in 1996. "Temptation" in its own right has been subject of many covers and in a number of languages.

== Rebecca Zadig version ==
"Temptation" was first recorded by Rebecca Zadig with additional lyrics and rendition vocals featuring Alex, the mononym of Alex Arash Labaf who started his career performing under his mononym Alex. The first version, had English as main vocals by Zadig featuring Alex that interpreted some additional Persian language lyrics. The song was launched with a separate music video that was directed and shot by Alec Cartio.

== Arash version ==
"Temptation" was re-released as a song mainly in the Persian language, this time crediting Arash as the main vocalist. Rebecca Zadig was reduced to a featuring role. This release became the definitive version and was Arash's third successful consecutive single after "Boro Boro" (that had reached number 1 in Sweden) and "Tike Tike Kardi" (that had peaked at number 2 in Sweden).

The song credited to Arash made it to number 2 on Sverigetopplistan, the official Swedish Singles Chart, also charting in Germany, Switzerland and Finland. A music video was released with Arash as the lead singer.

=== Charts ===
==== Weekly charts ====
Chart (2005–2006)	Peak position
CIS Airplay (TopHit)	79
Finland (Suomen virallinen lista)	15
Germany (GfK)	29
Greece (IFPI)	25
Hungary (Dance Top 40)	4
Hungary (Rádiós Top 40)	26
Hungary (Single Top 40)	5
Sweden (Sverigetopplistan)	2
Switzerland (Schweizer Hitparade)	42

==== Year-end charts ====
Chart (2005)	Position
Hungary (Rádiós Top 40)	66

=== Accolades ===
Year	Organization	Award	Result
2006
2006	Golden Gramophone Award	Golden Gramophone	Won
2006	MUZ-TV Awards	Best Duo	Nominated

== Other versions ==
=== Russian version "Vostochniye skazki" with Blestyaschie ===
"Vostochniye skazki (Восточные сказки)"

Single by Blestyaschie and Arash

from the album Vostochniye skazki
- Released: 2005
- Recorded: 2005
- Genre: Pop
- Label: Partija
- Songwriters: Robert Uhlmann; Alex Arash Labaf; Johan Bejerholm; Max Tavahen; Charles Burbank; Ronny Gold; Samy Goz; Pedro Maza Luaces

Blestyaschie and Arash singles chronology
"/"	"Vostochniye skazki (Восточные сказки)"

Music video
- "Vostochny Skazki" on YouTube

In 2005, a Russian language version of the song was made by Arash with the Russian girl group Blestyaschie (Russian: Блестящие). The song titled "Vostochniye skazki" (Russian: Восточные сказки, meaning Eastern fairytales) was credited to Blestyaschie featuring Arash. It appeared on Blestyaschie album also titled Vostochniye skazki and released on Partija Russian record label. A separate music video was shot for the single destined for the Russian market.

==== Charts ====
===== Weekly charts =====
Chart (2005–2006)	Peak position
CIS Airplay (TopHit)	4

===== Year-end charts =====
Chart (2005)	Position
CIS (Tophit)	98

=== "Versoeking" by Hi-5 ===
"Versoeking"

Single by Hi-5

from the album Versoeking
- Released: 2006
- Recorded: 2007
- Genre: Pop, dance
- Label: Select Music
- Songwriters: Robert Uhlmann; Alex Arash Labaf; Johan Bejerholm; Max Tavahen; Charles Burbank; Ronny Gold; Samy Goz; Pedro Maza Luaces

Hi-5 singles chronology
"/"	"Versoeking"

Music video
- "Versoeking" on YouTube

In 2006, the South African cover boy band Hi-5 covered the song in Afrikaans under the title "Versoeking" (meaning temptation in Afrikaans). It was a main single and the title track of the album also titled Versoeking which is the band's follow-up to the Soebat EP (2003) and the self-titled Hi-5 (2004).

=== "Verleid Mij" by Wing-Men ===
In 2015, the Dutch group Wing-Men covered the song in Dutch under the title "Verleid Mij". It is the debut single from the group.
