= Amir El-Falaki =

Danish vocalist and dancer

- Born: 12 August 1973 (age 53); Copenhagen, Denmark
- Origin: Copenhagen, Denmark
- Genre: Pop
- Occupations: Singer, dancer
- Instrument: Vocals
- Years active: 1995–present

Amir El-Falaki (born 12 August 1973) is a Danish vocalist, dance instructor, and member of the bubblegum pop group Toy-Box. He is of Moroccan descent and speaks Danish, English, Arabic, and French. Amir wanted to be a doctor, but became a dance teacher instead. He met Anila Mirza at a New Year's Eve party and they decided to form Toy-Box. The group is known for songs such as "Best Friend" and "Tarzan & Jane".

== Career outside of Toy-Box ==
Amir has worked as a dance teacher, music video choreographer, and trainer to F.C. Copenhagen's cheerleading team.

Amir performed a rap on and served as a dancer for Julie Lund's song, "Merhaba", at the Danish national Eurovision semi-final, Melodi Grand Prix 2007. However, their song came last (out of eight) in Semi-Final 2, and was subsequently eliminated in the Wildcard round with 11% of the vote, and so did not progress into the national final.

In 2009, Amir founded the award-winning Danseplaneten dance studio in Hellerup, Copenhagen.
