= Suddenly (Arash song) =

Single by Arash

from the album Donya
- Released: June 19, 2008
- Songwriters: Johan Bejerholm: Khaled Hadj Ibrahim; Kada Mustapha; Max Tavahen; Arash Labaf; Robert Uhlmann

"Suddenly" is a song by Iranian-Swedish Persian pop singer Arash for his second album Donya, featuring fellow Swedish singer Rebecca Zadig. It was released by Warner Music Sweden on June 19, 2008 becoming a summer hit in Sweden. The song is bilingual. The main verses are sung by Arash in Persian and the chorus in English by Rebecca Zadig and contains a sample of Algerian classic Abdel Kader. A second version retitled "Près de toi" (near you) released one year later, featuring the French-Algerian raï singer Najim and also Rebecca becoming trilingual French/Persian/English.

== Charts ==
=== Weekly charts ===
Chart (2008)	Peak position
Sweden (Sverigetopplistan)	8
Bulgaria (Singles Top 40)	32
