= Blestyashchiye =

Russian girl group

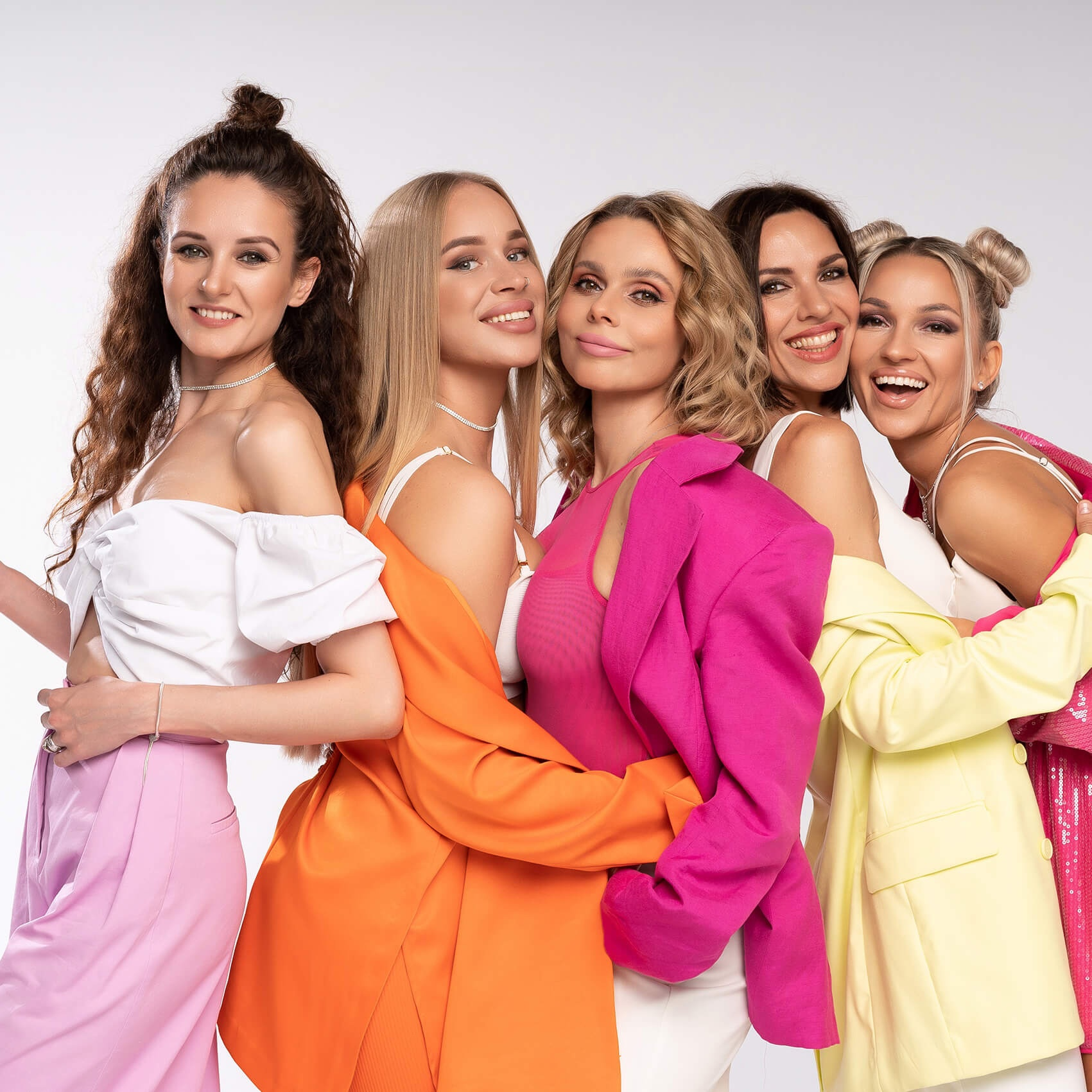

Background information
- Origin: Russia
- Genres: Dance-pop, teen pop
- Years active: 1995–present
- Members: Ksenia Novikova; Nadezhda Ruchka; Marina Berezhnaya; Sylvia Zolotova; Kristina Illarionova
- Past members: See: List of Blestyashchiye members Olga Orlova (1995–2000); Varvara Koroleva (1995–1996); Polina Iodis (1995–1998); Irina Lukyanova (1996–2003); Jeanna Friske (1997–2003); Yulia Kovalchuk (2001–2007); Anna Semenovich (2003–2007); Anastasia Osipova (2007–2015); Natalia Friske (2007–2008); Anna Dubovitskaya (2008–2011); Yulianna Lukasheva (2008–2009); Natalya Asmolova (2015)
- Website: Official Website

Blestyashchiye (Russian: Блестя́щие, IPA: [blʲɪˈsʲtʲæɕːɪɪ], lit. the brilliant ones) is one of the first all-girl singing groups in Russia.

== History ==
=== 1996–1999: "Tam, tol'ko tam" and "Prosto mechty" ===
Originally Blestyashchiye consisted of three singers: Olga Orlova, Polina Iodis and Varvara Koroleva. In 1996 Irina Lukjanova and Janna Friske joined the group when Varvara Koroleva left the group right after the release of their first album Tam, Tol'ko Tam (Russian: Там, только там, English: There, Only There). Featuring original arrangements, lovely lyrics, and artistic music videos, Blestyashchiye became quite popular. They went on tour across the country, and they were highly praised. There, Janna became an instant success with her excellent vocal abilities and superb dancing skills. In 1997 they released the album Tam, Tol'ko Tam (Remixes). In 1998, the group released their second album Prosto Mechty (Russian: Просто мечты, English: Only Dreams). This album included such musical best sellers, "Gde Zhe Ti Gde?", "Oblaka", and "Cha, Cha, Cha". After the album was released, Polina Iodis left the group and the three remaining girls continued to work together. In August 1999, Ksenia Novikova joined Blestyashchiye. Soon, the group released a new single "Za osen'yu pridet zima" (Russian: За осенью придёт зима, English: After autumn comes winter).

=== 2000–2002: "O ljubvi..." and "Za chetyre morya" ===
They released a new album in 2000, titled O Lyubvi... (Russian: О любви..., English: About Love...). The album featured ten new songs, one of which, "Ciao Bambino", was named the most "provocative" clip of year. The hit "Za Osen'yu Pridet Zima" was another single from O Lyubvi.... The group won many awards that year, and went on tour in cities of Russia, the countries of the Near abroad, and abroad. Soon Olga Orlova (the front member and the songwriter of the songs that made Blestyashchiye famous) became pregnant and left the group. The success of the group was later proven by Belym Snegom (By White Snow), a greatest hits collection, including "Belym Snegom" and "Dolgo Tebya Zdala".

In June 2001, Yulia Kovalchuk was finishing up her 10th and 11th years of schooling, after which she planned to leave Moscow and return to her hometown, Volgagrad, to take a year's vacation. Her friends had told her that Blestyashchiyes' producers were going to be in attendance at the school's year-end recital. The rumor was that "Blest" was hoping to include more dance in their shows, and thus they were looking for new talent. And the story goes, Julia was waiting to go onstage for her performance, when a Blest producer happened to pass by. The producer took an instant liking to Yulia, and asked if she could sing. Eventually they went to a studio, where she sang for them, and left her contact information. She went home as planned, for her much needed rest. On July 31, she received a call that she would need to be in Moscow on August 1(the next day), to start her new career as a member of the group Blestyashchiye. Yulia did not receive a very warm reception in Moscow. She was 18, and she was taking her first step into a pop group, whose members were struggling with finding an identity for the group, as well as their own survival. Yulia's first performance in Blestyashchiye came at the recording of "Pesna Goda" on September 5, 2001. Yulia described the occasion as "I was in the right place at the right time." Janna Friske is considered the leader of the group, publicity director, and oversees that girls communicate "daily". In their 'free time' the four members wrote songs for their next album, Za Chetyre Morya (Russian: За четыре моря, English: Beyond Four Seas) (2002).

=== 2003–2006: "Apel'sinoviy ray" and "Vostochniye skazki" ===
Their fifth studio album Apel'sinoviy ray (Russian: Апельсиновый рай, English: Orange Paradise) (2003) was an extraordinary success and left its mark on the year. The last hit song off the album, "Novogodnaya Pesnya", became a true anthem that goes to the heart of winter holidays at the year's end, and the earlier hit song "Apelcinovie Rai" the summer anthem. Blestyashchiye was one of the first girl-groups in Russia, yet they still have a firm hold on the leading position among other female groups. In 2003, after the release of Apelcinovie Rai, Janna Friske left the group to embark on her solo career. On April 1, 2004 Friske was replaced by Nadia Ruchka. When asked the question how she joined group Blestyashchiye, Nadia answered so: "It is very simple. My friend called and told that Blestyashchiye wanted me to audition. My previous band just had just broken up. And 'Blest' was searching for new members. But was on first of April (April Fools' Day), and I mistook the offer as a joke. Therefore I said: 'Please, you will not joke. I do not wish to listen to such silly jokes. You will come home, and we shall talk.' At first I joined in group on a trial period. I have started to go a little with girls by tour. Stepped onstage in two-three numbers. Then I began to participate in recording songs." In the group, Nadia was well accepted. "If there are any questions, we find it easy to communicate," the singer tells. "Everyone understands, the work is complex. Now the trial my period has ended, therefore I work on full power." In 2005 the group released their 8th album, Vostochniye skazki (Russian: Восточные сказки, English: Oriental Fairytales) featuring a duet with the famous Iranian singer Arash.

=== 2007–2009: "Odnoklassniki" and singles ===
In March 2007, Anna Semenovich left the group to pursue a solo career, and was soon replaced by Anastasia Osipova. In summer 2007, amid rumors of pregnancy and a solo career, Kseniya left the group. At the 2007 Russian Music Awards, it was announced that Natalia Friske was the newest member of Blestyashchiye.

In June 2008, Natalia Friske leaves the group. She was replaced by Yulianna Lukasheva. Together with Julianna, the band recorded two singles, "Classmates" (Russian: Одноклассники) and "You Know, Dear" (Russian: "Знаешь, милый". for which music videos were filmed.

In mid of November 2009, Yulianna Lukasheva announced her departure. At the "Golden Gramophone" on November 28, 2009, the group presented a renewed lineup with Marina Berezhnaya.

=== 2010–2014 ===
In June 2011, Kseniya Novikova returned back to the group. They recorded a new song "Love" (Russian: Любовь). In October, Anna Dubovitskaja announced her departure from the group due to pregnancy.

In the fall of 2012, Ksenia Novikova, in parallel with her work in the group, began her solo career, recording a solo song "I want to forget you" (Russian: Я так хочу тебя забыть).

The updated line-up of the group recorded several new songs: "My Dear" (Russian: Милый мой), "From What" (Russian: Из чего же), "Green Eyes" (Russian: Зелёные глаза), "Birthday" (Russian: День рождения), "To The Equator" (Russian: К экватору), "Lose" (Russian: Потерять). On November 11, 2013, the premiere of the video for "Lose" took place on the musical channel RU.TV and on November 14 - presentation at the restaurant "Stakan". On July 24, 2014 the group performed at "New Wave 2014" in Jurmala. Along with the main soloists, many soloists of past years also performed on stage.

=== 2015–2018: Ruchka's departure and Novikova's return ===
On February 14, 2015 in Tver, the girls released a new song "Don't Give Me to Anyone" (Russian: Не Отдавай Меня Никому). In June, Anastasia Osipova announced on her Facebook page that she was leaving the group. She was replaced by a former soloist, Natalia Asmolova. In October, Ksenia Novikova announced her departure. Natalia Asmolova also leaves the group. On October 16 the group is filming a new video for the new single "Brigade of Painters" (Russian: Бригада Маляров) with the new line-up. The new members are Silvia Zolotova and Kristina Illarionova In November, "Blestyashchiye" with Ksenia Novikova and the new members (Silvia and Kristina) performed at the ceremony dedicated to the 20th anniversary of the "Golden Gramophone" with their hit-single (Russian: А я всё летала) and got an award for this song. On December 30, a collection of songs was released

In June 2017, Nadezhda Ruchka went on maternity leave, and the band released a new single "Love" (Russian: Любовь) as a trio. Natalia Asmolova got to replace Nadezhda sometimes during their performances. In August, Nadezhda gave birth to her son, and said that she is not planning to return. In May 2018, Ksenia Novikova returned for the third time. In June 2018 they released a new single "The Whistle Is Calling" (Russian: Свисток зовёт). The opera singer Svetlana Feodulova took part in the recording of the song.

=== 2020–present: Ruchka's return ===
In May 2020, two new singles "Waves" (Russian: Волны) and "Star" (Russian:Звёздочка) were released.

On May 16, 2022, Nadezhda Ruchka, who left for the first time back in the summer of 2017, returned back to the group. The group recorded a duet with Super Zhorik (Mikhail Galustyan) for the song "Different". (Russian: Другая).

== Members ==
=== Line-ups ===
- 03.1995 – 04.1996: Olga Orlova, Polina Iodis & Varvara Koroleva
- 04.1996 – 05.1997: Olga Orlova, Polina Iodis & Irina Lukyanova
- 05.1997 – 11.1998: Olga Orlova, Polina Iodis, Irina Lukyanova & Zhanna Friske
- 11.1998 – 08.1999: Olga Orlova, Irina Lukyanova & Zhanna Friske
- 08.1999 – 11.2000: Olga Orlova, Irina Lukyanova, Zhanna Friske & Kseniya Novikova
- 11.2000 – 08.2001: Irina Lukyanova, Zhanna Friske & Kseniya Novikova
- 08.2001 – 03.2003: Irina Lukyanova, Zhanna Friske, Kseniya Novikova & Yulia Kovalchuk
- 03.2003 – 06.2003: Zhanna Friske, Kseniya Novikova & Yulia Kovalchuk
- 06.2003 – 09.2003: Zhanna Friske, Kseniya Novikova, Yulia Kovalchuk & Anna Semenovich
- 09.2003 – 04.2004: Kseniya Novikova, Yulia Kovalchuk & Anna Semenovich
- 04.2004 – 03.2007: Kseniya Novikova, Yulia Kovalchuk, Anna Semenovich & Nadezhda Rucka
- 03.2007 – 05.2007: Kseniya Novikova, Yulia Kovalchuk, Nadezhda Rucka & Anastasia Osipova
- 05.2007 – 10.2007: Yulia Kovalchuk, Nadezhda Rucka, Anastasia Osipova
- 06.2007 – 08.2007: Yulia Kovalchuk, Nadezhda Rucka, Anastacia Osipova & Natalia Asmolova
- 10.2007 – 01.2008: Yulia Kovalchuk, Nadezhda Rucka, Anastacia Osipova & Natalia Friske
- 02.2008 – 06.2008: Nadezhda Rucka, Anastasia Osipova, Natalia Friske & Anna Dubovitskaya
- 06.2008 – 11.2009: Nadezhda Rucka, Anastasia Osipova, Anna Dubovitskaya & Yulianna Lukasheva
- 11.2009 – 06.2011: Nadezhda Rucka, Anastasia Osipova, Anna Dubovitskaya & Marina Berezhnaya
- 06.2011 – 09.2011: Kseniya Novikova, Nadezhda Rucka, Anastasia Osipova, Anna Dubovitskaya & Marina Berezhnaya
- 09.2011 – 06.2015 : Kseniya Novikova, Nadezhda Rucka, Anastasia Osipova & Marina Berezhnaya
- 06.2015 – 10.2015 : Kseniya Novikova, Nadezhda Rucka, Marina Berezhnaya & Natalya Asmolova
- 10.2015 – 06.2017 : Nadezhda Rucka, Marina Berezhnaya, Sylvia Zolotova & Kristina Illarionova
- 06.2017 – 05.2018 : Marina Berezhnaya, Sylvia Zolotova & Kristina Illarionova
- 05.2018 — 05.2022 : Ksenia Novikova, Marina Berezhnaya, Sylvia Zolotova & Kristina Illarionova
- 05.2022 — : Ksenia Novikova, Nadezhda Rucka, Marina Berezhnaya, Sylvia Zolotova & Kristina Illarionova

=== Line-up changes ===
Member			Participation	Replaced by
Nickname	Name in Latin script (birth name)	Name in Cyrillic script	Participation	Replaced by
Olga (Ольга)	Olga Orlova	Ольга Орлова	1995–2000	Yulia
Polina (Полина)	Polina Iodis	Полина Иодис	1995–1998	Kseniya
Varvara (Варвара)	Varvara Koroleva	Варвара Королева	1995–1996	Irina
Irina (Ирина)	Irina Lukyanova	Ирина Лукьянова	1996–2003	Anna S.
Zhanna (Жанна)	Zhanna Friske	Жанна Фриске	1997–2003	Nadezhda
Kseniya (Ксения)	Kseniya Novikova	Ксения Новикова	1999–2007; 2011–2015 since 2018	1st time: Natalya second time: Krisina current member
Yulia (Юлия)	Yulia Kovalchuk	Юлия Ковальчук	2001–2007	Anna D.
Anna S. (Анна)	Anna Semenovich	Анна Семенович	2003–2007	Anastasia
Nadezhda (Надежда)	Nadezhda Ruchka	Надежда Ручка	2004–2017 since 2022	Natalya current member
Anastasia (Анастасия)	Anastasia Osipova	Анастасия Осипова	2007-2015	Natalya
Natalya (Наталия)	Natalya Asmolova	Наталия Асмолова	2007; 2015 2017	Natalya Sylvia Kseniya
Natalia (Наталья)	Natalia Friske	Наталья Фриске	2007–2008	Yulianna
Anna D. (Анна)	Anna Dubovitskaya	Анна Дубовицкая	2008–2011	Kseniya
Yulianna (Юлианна)	Yulianna Lukasheva	Юлианна Лукашева	2008–2009	Marina
Marina (Марина)	Marina Berezhnaya	Марина Бережная	since 2009	current member
Sylvia (Сильвия)	Sylvia Zolotova	Сильвия Золотова	since 2015	current member
Kristina (Кристина)	Kristina Illarionova	Кристина Илларионова	since 2015	current member

== Discography ==
=== Studio albums ===
- 1996: Tam, tol'ko tam ("There, Only there")
- 1998: Prosto mechty ("Only dreams")
- 2000: O ljubvi... ("About love...")
- 2002: Za chetyre morya ("Beyond four seas")
- 2003: Apel'sinoviy ray ("Orange paradise")
- 2006: Vostochniye skazki ("Oriental fairytales")

=== Compilation albums ===
- 1997: Tam, tol'ko tam (Remixes) ("There, Only there (Remixes)" - 1st Remix album)
- 2000: Belym snegom ("White snow" - 1st Compilation album)
- 2008: Odnoklassniki
- 2016: Best 20

=== Singles ===
From "Tam, tol'ko tam"

- 1996: Tam, tol'ko tam (O. Orlova, P. Iodis, V. Koroleva) ("There, Only there")
- 1996: Tuman (O. Orlova, P. Iodis, I. Lukyanova) ("Fog")
- 1997: Cveti (O. Orlova, P. Iodis, I. Lukyanova, Z. Friske) ("Flowers")

From "Prosto mechty"

- 1997: Oblaka (O. Orlova, P. Iodis, I. Lukyanova, Z. Friske) ("Clouds")
- 1998: Cha, Cha, Cha (O. Orlova, P. Iodis, I. Lukyanova, Z. Friske) ("Cha, Cha, Cha")
- 1998: Gde Zhe Ti Gde (O. Orlova, P. Iodis, I. Lukyanova, Z. Friske) ("Where are you, where")

From "O ljubvi..."

- 1998: New Year (feat. A-Mega) (O. Orlova, I. Lukyanova, Z. Friske)
- 1999: Milyi Rulevoy (O. Orlova, I. Lukyanova, Z. Friske, K. Novikova) ("Sweet steering")
- 1999: Za osen'yu pridet zima (O. Orlova, I. Lukyanova, Z. Friske, K. Novikova) ("During the autumn comes winter")
- 1999: Ciao bambino (O. Orlova, I. Lukyanova, Z. Friske, K. Novikova) ("Hey baby")

From "Belym snegom"

- 2000: Belym snegom (I. Lukyanova, Z. Friske, K. Novikova) ("White snow")
- 2001: Dolgo tebya zdala (I. Lukyanova, Z. Friske, K. Novikova) ("How long you waited")

From "Za chetyre morya"

- 2001: Au, Au (I. Lukyanova, Z. Friske, K. Novikova, Y. Kovalchuk)
- 2002: Za chetyre morya (I. Lukyanova, Z. Friske, K. Novikova, Y. Kovalchuk) ("Beyond four seas")
- 2002: A ya vse letala (I. Lukyanova, Z. Friske, K. Novikova, Y. Kovalchuk) ("And I flew")
- 2003: Ya i ty (I. Lukyanova, Z. Friske, K. Novikova, Y. Kovalchuk) ("I and You")

From "Apel'sinoviy ray"

- 2003: Apel'sinoviy pesnya (Z. Friske, K. Novikova, Y. Kovalchuk, A. Semenovich) ("Orange song")

From "Vostochniye skazki"

- 2004: Novogodnya pesnya (K. Novikova, Y. Kovalchuk, A. Semenovich, N. Rucka) ("New Year Song")
- 2005: Palmy parami (K. Novikova, Y. Kovalchuk, A. Semenovich, N. Rucka) ("Palm pairs")
- 2005: Brat moy desantnik (K. Novikova, Y. Kovalchuk, A. Semenovich, N. Rucka) ("Brother my paratrooper")
- 2005: Vostochniye skazki (feat. Arash) (K. Novikova, Y. Kovalchuk, A. Semenovich, N. Rucka) ("Oriental fairytales")
- 2006: Agent 007 (K. Novikova, Y. Kovalchuk, A. Semenovich, N. Rucka) ("Agent 007")
- 2007: Kak zvezda (K. Novikova, Y. Kovalchuk, A. Semenovich, N. Rucka) ("Like a Star")

From "Odnoklassniki"

- 2008: Odnoklassniki (N. Rucka, A. Osipova, A. Dubovitskaya, Y. Lukasheva) ("Classmates")

Singles only

- 2007: Tili-testo (K. novikova, N. Ruchka, Y. Kovalchuk, A. Osipova)
- 2008: Znaesh, Milyi (N. Rucka, A. Osipova, A. Dubovitskaya, Y. Lukasheva) ("Do You Know My Dear?")
- 2010: Shar (N. Rucka, A. Osipova, A. Dubovitskaya, M. Berezhnaya) ("Ball")
- 2010: Utro (N. Rucka, A. Osipova, A. Dubovitskaya, M. Berezhnaya) ("Morning")
- 2011: Lubov (N. Rucka, A. Osipova, A. Dubovitskaya, M. Berezhnaya, K. Novikova) ("Love")
- 2011: Milyi Moy ("My Dear")
- 2012: Iz chego zhe? ("What is it?)"
- 2012: Zelenye Glaza ("Green eyes)"
- 2013: S Dnem Rozhdenya ("Happy Birthday")
- 2013: K Ekvatoru ("To Ekvator")
- 2013: Poteryat ("To Lost")
- 2015 : Ne otdavay menya nikomu ("Don't give me to anyone")
- 2015 : Brigada malyarov ("Brigade of Painters")
- 2017 : Eto Lubov ("It's Love")
- 2017 : Ryzhaya Devochka ("Redhead Girl")
- 2017 : Solntse ("The Sun")
- 2018 : Svistok sovot! sovmestno s Svetlanoy Feodulovoy ("The whistle is calling! feat Svetlana Feodulova")
- 2020 : Volny ("Waves")
- 2020 : Zvozdochka ("Star")
