= Olga Orlova (singer) =

Russian singer (born 1977)

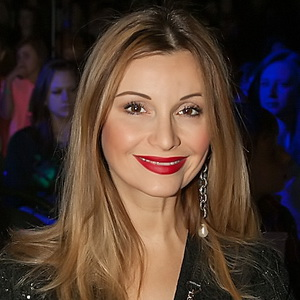
- ODRI on show as part of Fashion Week in Moscow, 2013
- Born: Olga Yrevna Nosova; 13 November 1977 (age 48); Moscow, RSFSR, Soviet Union
- Occupations: Singer, film actress
- Years active: 1991–present
- Height: 1.55 m (5 ft 1 in)
- Website: http://olgaorlova.ru/

Olga George Orlova (Russian: Ольга Юрьевна Орлова; born on 13 November 1977) is a Russian pop singer, actress, songwriter. She was the founder and lead singer of the pop-group Blestyashchiye, from 1995 until 2000. The pop-group «Velvet Music» 2015–present.

== Biography ==
=== 1995—2001: Blestyashchie and solo career ===
Was born in Moscow. Debut took place in the first group video "There, only there". Orlova was not just the lead singer in the group, but is also the author of many of the songs, "Where you, where?", "Chao, Bambina!" and many others with which Blestyashchie has gained large popularity. In 5 years with the group, they released five albums: There, Only There, There, Only There (Remixes), Just Dreams, About Love and White Snow. At the end of 2000, she left the group and returned to the stage in 2001. At first she intended to perform alone, but then she changed her mind. In the fall, there was a contest of sorts, and out of a large number of singing and dancing girls, she chose Oksana and Marina, who, in her words, she liked immediately. On December 5, the debut album, The First, was released. The launch of the album took place at Gorbushkino Dvor. The music videos for the songs "Angel", "I'm with You", and "Late" were filmed. The young company Artes Records Production took over the release of the CD, which was designed by Orlova herself.

"This is my first independent work, which I'm happy with. It was interesting to work, but to be honest, it was difficult - you have to do everything by yourself. But you control the process yourself, you don't depend on anyone else, and you get all the dividends yourself. I'm happy with the result!"

=== 2002—2006 ===
In 2002, she starred in the historical drama Golden Age about the Catherine era, where she played a major role. A creative alliance is born with Kim Breitburg, who wrote a romance for the film, which was performed by. In November 2002, went to participate in the third season of the reality show of the Channel One Last Hero 3. At the end of 2002, she started touring. The solo concerts were played in Kyiv, Blagoveshchensk, Kaliningrad, Khabarovsk, and Alma-Ata. The music video for the song "I'm Always with You" (a duet with Andrei Gubin) was shot in January 2003 by director Dmitry Zakharov. Took part in the Song of the Year festival with the compositions "Late" (2002), "I'm Always with You" and "Violet" (2003), "Above the Sky" (2004). At the end of 2003, Orlova reached the finals of the festival with the song "Palms", the author of which is a friend of the singer, the former lead singer of Amega and Vintage, Alexei Romanof. Before that, Olga herself had twice become a laureate of the festival as a lyricist, when she was a member of the group "Blestyaschie".

In 2004, she starred in the music video of the famous German pop singer Thomas Anders, "Tonight Is the Night".

In 2006, her second album, If You're Waiting for Me, was released. Most of the songs on the album were composed by Alexei Romanoff. The song "Stop" from this album is the only one in which Orlova herself performed as a composer. In 2007, she retired from active musical life and for eight years was actively involved in films and acting in the theater.

=== 2015-present ===
In 2015, she returned to the stage with the song "Bird", the music to which Alexei Romanoff wrote, and the lyrics herself. The filming of the music video, directed by herself, took place in the Crimea. On September 5, 2015, Orlova's first concert after her return to the stage took place. The performance took place at the Day of the City in Kerch, Crimea.

In February 2016, in co-authorship with Maxim Fadeev, she releases the song "Goodbye, My Friend", dedicated to Zhanna Friske.

Since March 25, 2017, she has been one of the hosts of the reality show Dom-2.

== Filmography ==
- 1991 Anna Karamazoff as Marie
- 2003 The Golden Age as Olga Alexandrovna Zherebzova
