= Rebecca Zadig =

Swedish singer (born 1982)

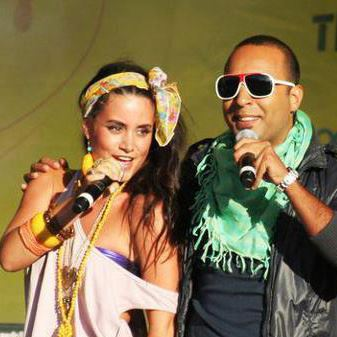
- Rebecca and Arash in a concert in 2009

Background information
- Born: 27 July 1982 (age 44)
- Origin: Limhamn, Sweden
- Genres: Pop, dance music
- Years active: 2004–2010

Rebecca Zadig (born 27 July 1982) is a Swedish singer.

== Career ==
Rebecca Zadig was featured in Arash's song "Temptation". This song is a newer version of her own song "Temptation" which also featured Arash (then known as 'Alex'). Lyrics of the two songs differ considerably. While Rebecca's song is in English with a solo by Arash in Persian, Arash's version is a Persian song with an English chorus.

Rebecca Zadig also sang in the song "Bombay Dreams" with Aneela in 2004 and has been featured in "Mitarsam" (also called "Suddenly") - singles from Arash.

In live performances of Arash, for example the one he did on "Live in Sopot" at the Polish television, and in others, Rebecca Zadig sang the song with Arash, although the recorded version of the song "Arash" is normally sung by Helena (who does not appear in public).

She also works in fashion and underwear design.

== Discography ==
=== Singles ===
==== As lead artist ====
| Title | Year | Peak chart positions | Album |
| Title | Year | SWE | Album |
|---|---|---|---|
| "Bombay Dreams" (& Aneela) | 2004 | 3 | Bombay Dreams |

==== As featured artist ====
| Title | Year | Peak chart positions | | | | | Album |
| Title | Year | SWE | FIN | GER | GRE | SWI | Album |
|---|---|---|---|---|---|---|---|
| "Temptation" (Arash) | 2005 | 2 | 15 | 29 | 25 | 42 | Arash |
| "Suddenly" (Arash) | 2008 | 8 | — | — | — | — | Donya |
"—" denotes single that did not chart

=== Songs ===
==== As lead artist ====
| Title | Year | Album |
|---|---|---|
| "Temptation" (feat. Alex) | 2005 | Unknown |

==== As featured artist ====
| Title | Year | Album |
|---|---|---|
| "Bombay Dreams" (Arash feat Aneela) | 2005 | Arash |
| "Mitarsam" (Arash) | 2008 | Donya+Best |
