= Toy-Box =

Danish pop band

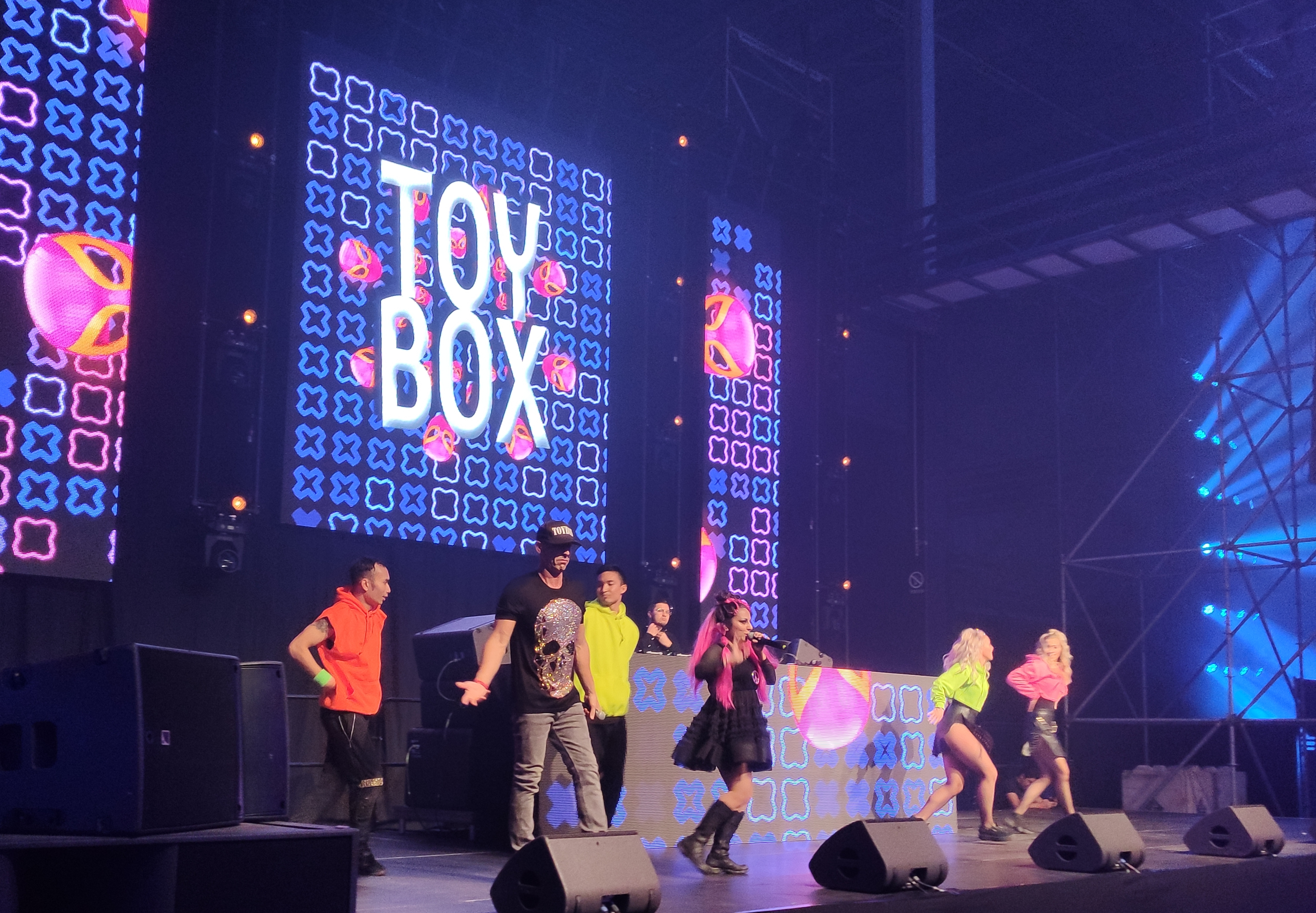
- Toy-Box 2019 concert

Background information
- Origin: Denmark
- Genres: Bubblegum pop; Eurodance
- Years active: 1996–2003; 2017–present
- Label: Edel
- Members: Amir El-Falaki; Anila Mirza
- Website: www.Toy-Box.dk at the Wayback Machine (archived 22 September 2003)

Toy-Box is a Danish bubblegum pop band, best known for their hit singles "Tarzan & Jane", "Best Friend", "E.T.", "Superstar", and "The Sailor Song". The group's members are vocalists Amir El-Falaki and Anila Mirza.

== History ==
Toy-Box was founded by Amir El-Falaki and Anila Mirza in 1996, after they had met each other at a New Year's Eve party. They had been both singing and dancing professionally for some years, and also stand behind the choreographies of the group. Before becoming a part of the group, El-Falaki used to be a dance teacher.

The group's debut single, "Tarzan & Jane", was championed by Smash Hits magazine in the United Kingdom in 1999, but their UK label Edel decided to hold back the release until later on in the year, to coincide with the release of Disney's Tarzan. They elected to release "Best Friend" first; although it received a lot of rotation on the television channel The Box, it only reached number 41 in the UK Singles Chart, and plans to release "Tarzan & Jane" were cancelled. It reached number 2 in the Dutch hit lists and number 15 on the Eurochart Hot 100. In 1999, the single peaked at number 16 on MTV Europe.

The group's debut album, FanTastic, includes the hits "The Sailor Song", "Best Friend", "Tarzan & Jane", "Teddybear" and "Super-Duper-Man". It was released in September 1999 and followed in 2001 by a second album, ToyRide, which includes fan-favorite songs "www.girl", "Wizard of Oz" and "Prince of Arabia".

After the group broke up, El-Falaki worked as a dance teacher, music video choreographer and trainer to F.C. Copenhagen's cheerleading team. Mirza later released a solo album as Aneela, featuring collaboration with Arash, including the singles "Jaande", "Chori Chori", and "Bombay Dreams". When asked about another Toy-Box release in 2007, Aneela said, "I don't know, anything's possible."

In 2017, Toy-Box returned to tour alongside Aqua, Vengaboys, and many more groups for a series of 1990s concerts. They performed at the Vi Elsker 90'erne events in Denmark in 2017.

== Discography ==
=== Studio albums ===
Title	Album details	Peak chart positions					Certifications
Title	Album details	DEN	FIN	NLD	NOR	SWE	Certifications
FanTastic	Released: 21 May 1999; Label: Edel; Formats: CD; cassette; digital download	3	28	1	9	17	DEN: Platinum; NLD: Platinum
ToyRide	Released: 28 July 2001; Label: Edel; Formats: CD; cassette; digital download	22	—	91	—	—	
"—" denotes items which were not released in that country or failed to chart.

=== Singles ===
Year	Title	Peak chart positions										Certifications	Album
Year	Title	AUS	DEN	EUR	GER	NED	NOR	NZ	SWE	SWI	UK	Certifications	Album
1998	"Tarzan & Jane"	41	2	15	37	2	3	27	8	34	—	NVPI: Platinum	FanTastic
1999	"Best Friend"	39	6	11	—	1	13	—	23	—	41	NVPI: Gold	FanTastic
1999	"The Sailor Song"	—	—	—	—	9	—	—	—	—	—		FanTastic
2001	"Superstar"	—	—	—	—	41	—	—	—	—	—		ToyRide
2001	"www.girl"	—	—	—	—	35	—	—	—	—	—		ToyRide
"—" denotes items which were not released in that country or failed to chart.

=== Promotional singles ===
Title	Year	Album
"Teddybear"	1999	FanTastic

== See also ==
- Aqua (band)
