= Arash (singer) =

Iranian-Swedish singer (born 1977)

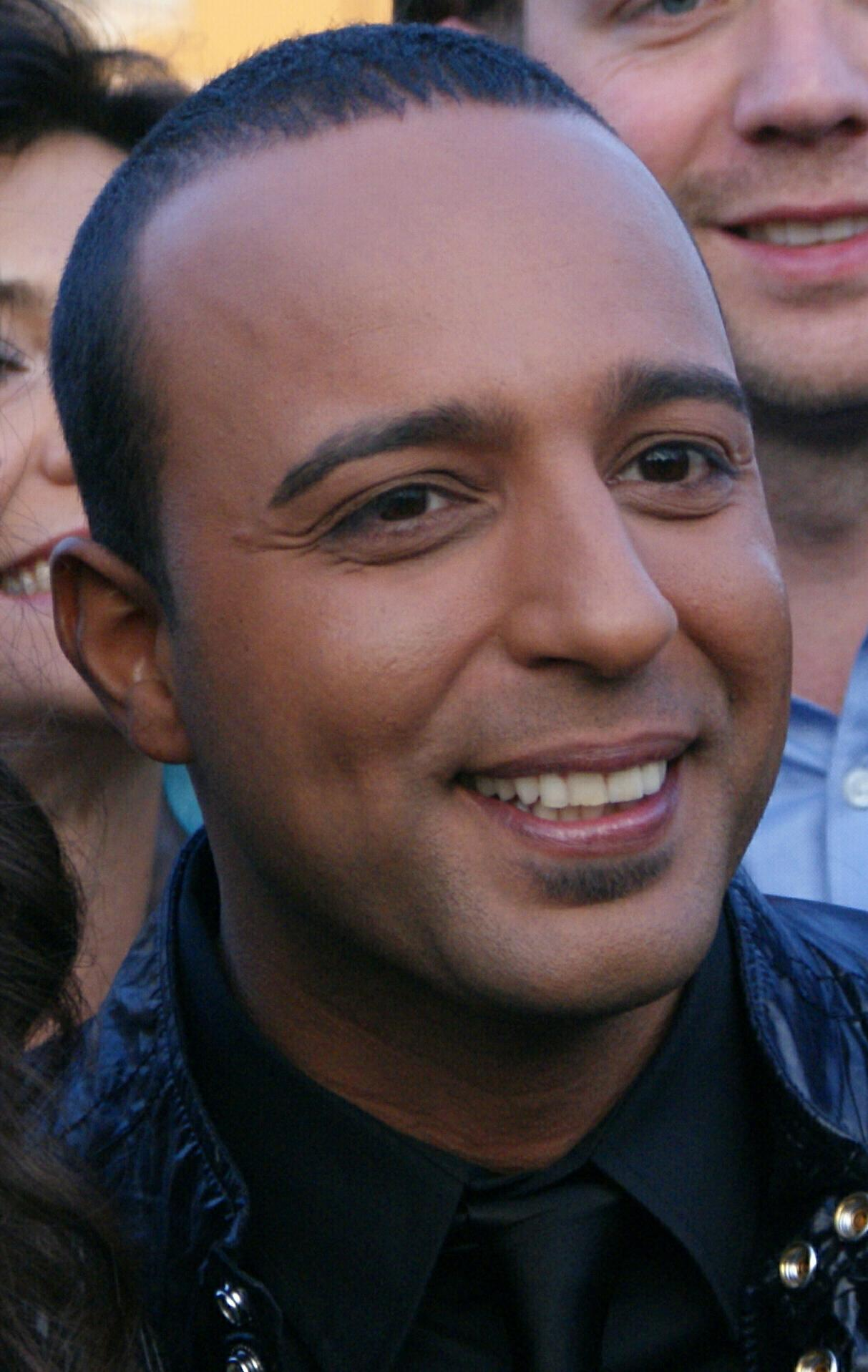
- Arash Labbaf in Moscow, Russia, 2009

Background information
- Born: Arash Labbaf; 23 April 1977 (age 49); Tehran, Iran
- Genres: Persian pop; hip hop; R&B; dance; house
- Occupations: Singer, DJ
- Years active: 2004–present
- Label: Warner Music Scandinavia (WEA)
- Website: arash.com

Arash Labbaf (Persian: آرش لباف, pronounced [ɒːˈɾæʃ ɛ læbˈbɒːf], Azerbaijani: Arəş Ləbaf; born 23 April 1977) is an Iranian-Swedish singer, entertainer, and producer.

He represented Azerbaijan along with Aysel in the Eurovision Song Contest 2009, finishing third with the song "Always". He is also one of the judges of Persia's Got Talent, a Persian franchise of the British talent show Got Talent.

== Early life ==
Arash Labbaf was born in Tehran, Iran. He and his parents lived near Mellat Park. At age ten, he and his family moved to Sweden, where he still resides. In an interview with BBC Persian Television, he mentioned that his mother and father are from the Iranian cities of Shiraz and Isfahan, respectively.

Arash Labbaf has stated in his interviews that he is interested in association football. Accordingly, he released songs about association football. Also, in an interview with Deutsche Welle, Arash stated that he had been interested in singing since childhood, and he even formed an informal band with his friends.

== Career ==
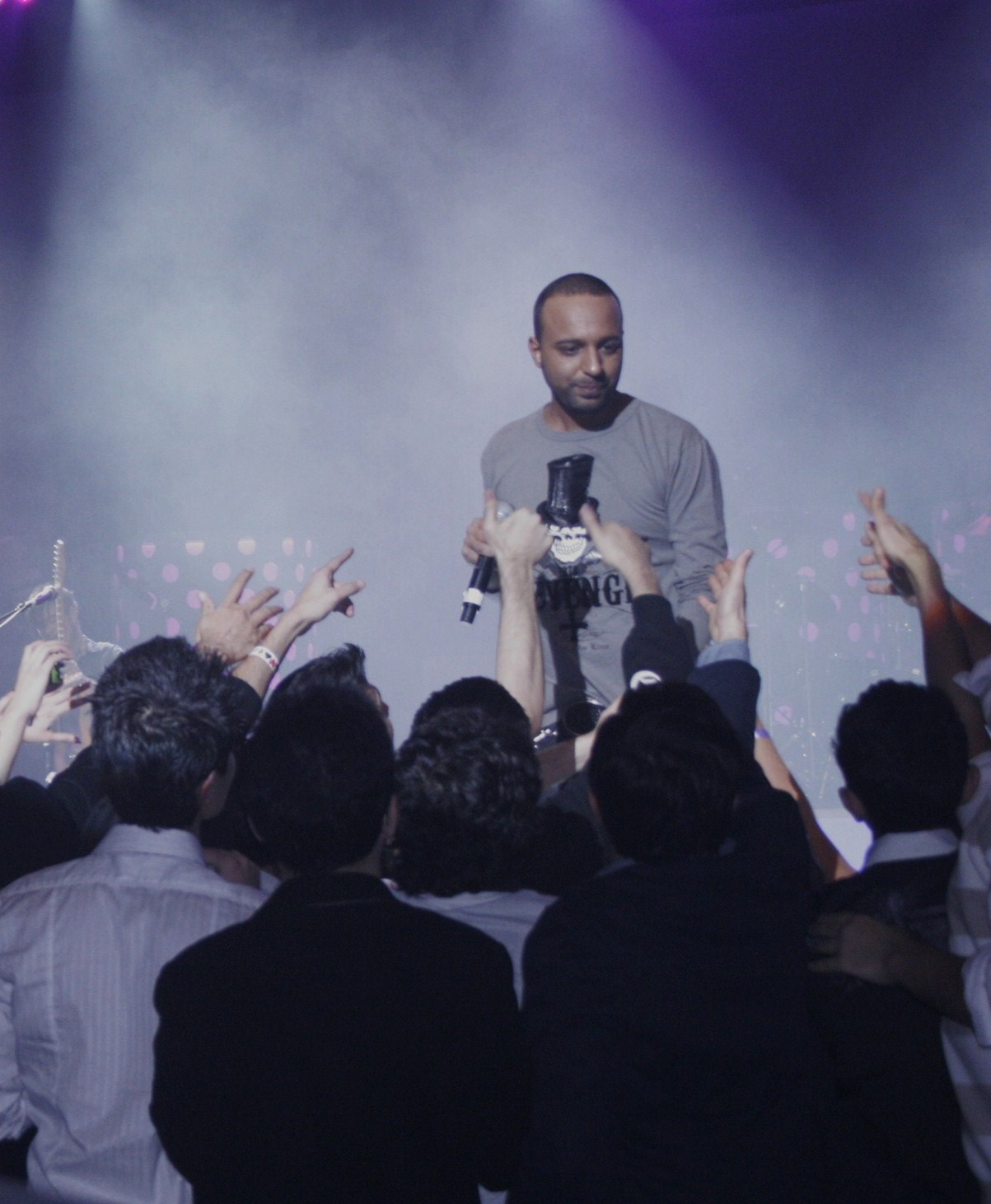
Arash in Las Vegas (2008)

Arash Labbaf said that the reason he chooses to sing in his native language is because of his "deep attachment to Iran and Persian culture."

His debut album, Arash, was released by Warner Music Sweden in June 2005, after he had completed his college studies. His singles, "Boro Boro" ("Go Away") and "Temptation" (featuring Rebecca) made it to the hit lists around Europe. Their respective videos garnered significant airplay on more than 20 MTV outlets worldwide. In addition to successes in his home countries' music charts, namely Sweden and Iran, the platinum-selling singer and producer Arash has had hits notably in Eastern European and South-East European charts like Russia, Ukraine, Greece, Bulgaria, Poland, Hungary, Georgia, Armenia, Azerbaijan, Serbia, Slovakia, Slovenia, Romania, Turkey and in Asian music charts like in Tajikistan, Kazakhstan, Afghanistan, Uzbekistan and throughout the Arab Middle Eastern countries. His singles have been charted many times on the Swiss and Finnish charts, and he is especially famous in Poland.

Arash's records were certified gold in 5 countries: his album Arash in Germany, Russia, Slovenia, and Greece and the single "Boro Boro" in Sweden. This song was also featured in the Hindi Bollywood film Bluffmaster!, and he was the featured Artist of the Month on MTV India.

Helena did not take part in the music video of "Pure Love", although her voice was featured in it. The video starred Arash, together with the Venezuelan beauty queen, Marianne Puglia.

Arash has produced, along with Thomas G:son, Robert Uhlmann, and Johan Bejerholm the Swedish entry to the Junior Eurovision Song Contest 2010 "Allt jag vill ha" that was performed by Josefine Ridell.

== Eurovision Song Contest ==
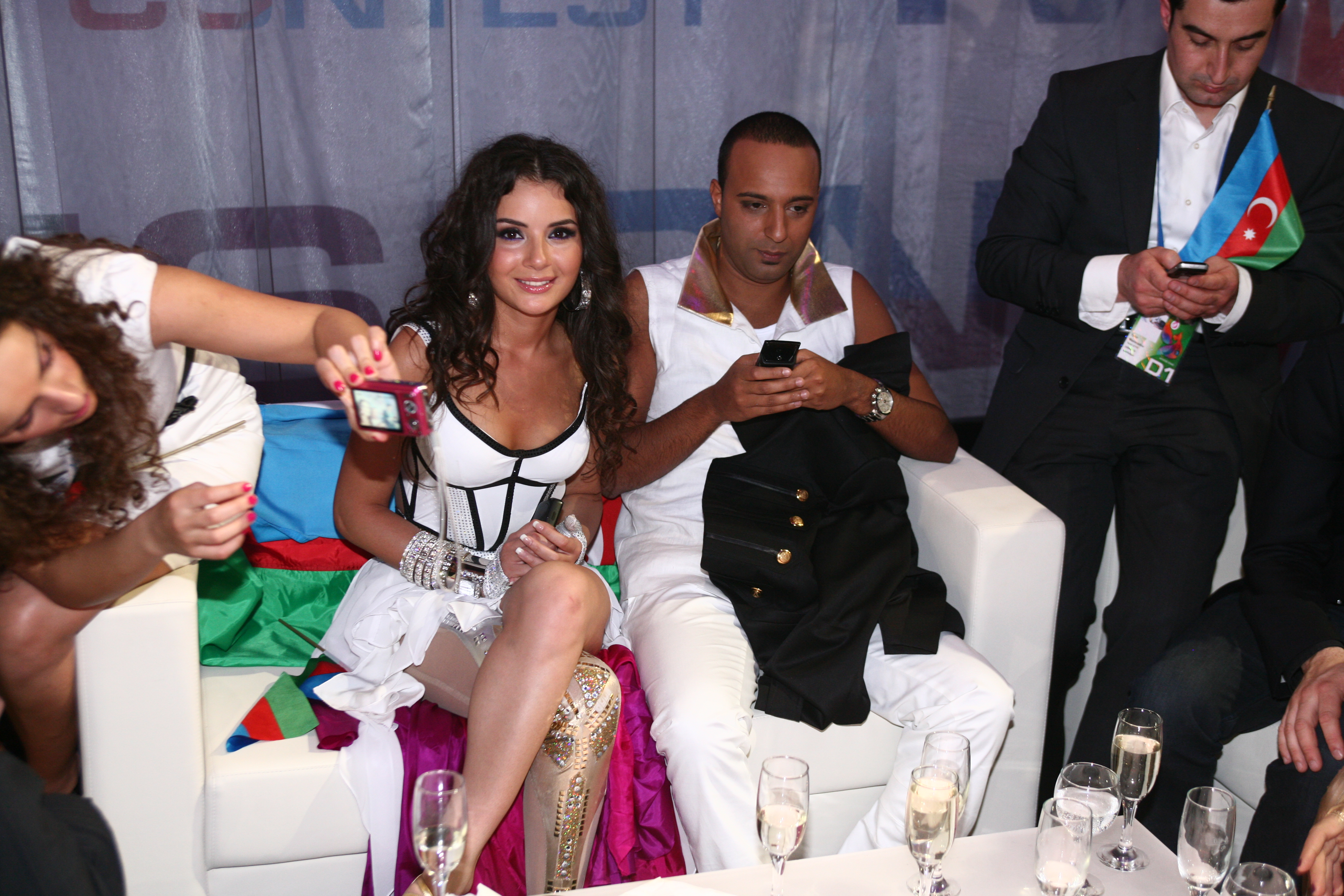
Aysel and Arash in the Green Room during the Eurovision Song Contest 2009.

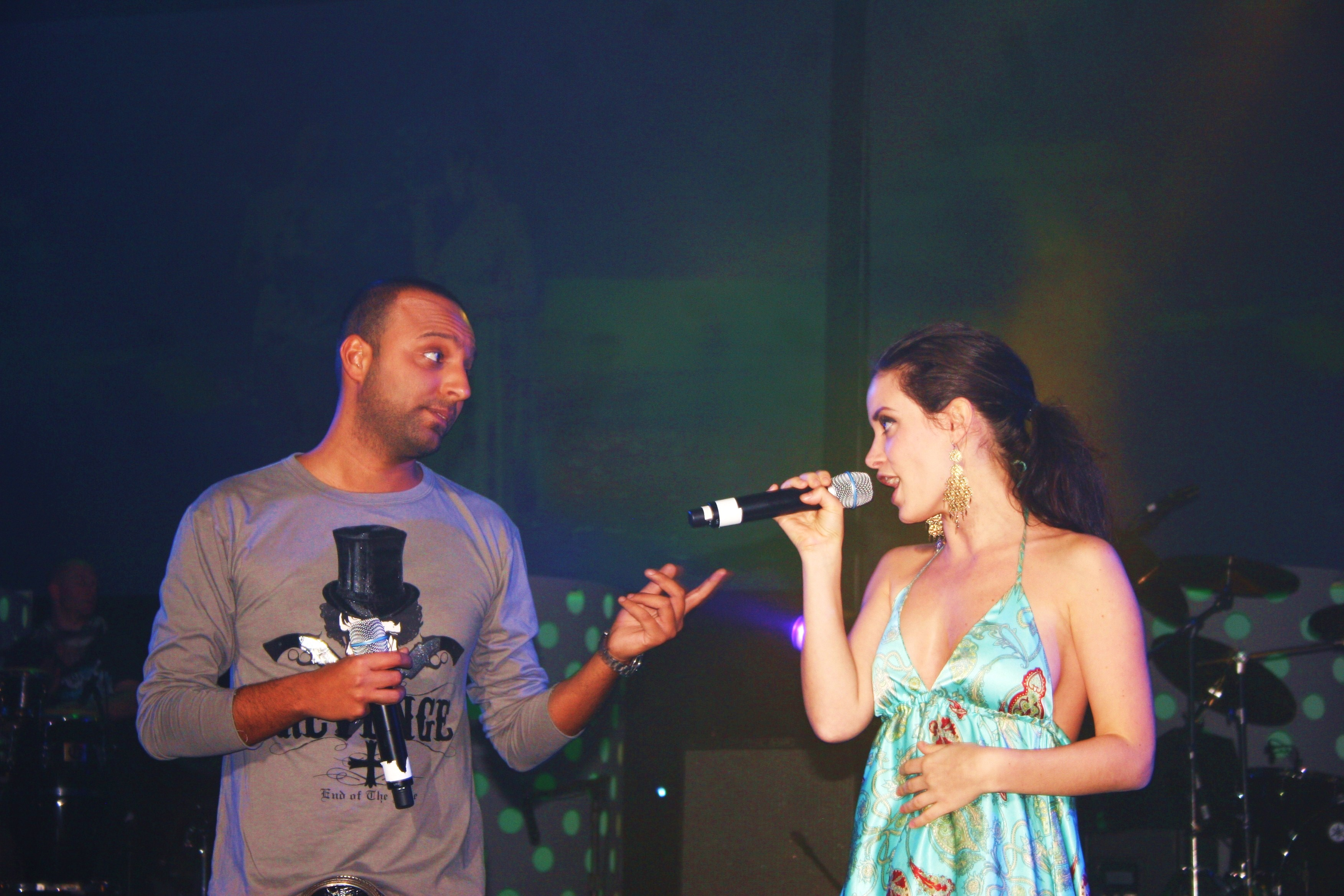
Rebecca Zadig and Arash in a concert in Las Vegas, December 2008

In early 2009, it was revealed that the Azerbaijani entry for the Eurovision Song Contest 2009 would be the song "Always" which was written and composed by Arash. The song was performed by Aysel Teymurzadeh and Arash in a duet in Semifinal 2 of the Eurovision competition. The song qualified for the Eurovision Song Contest final which took place on 16 May 2009, and was placed third. In one of his interviews, Arash explained his decision to represent Azerbaijan in this contest: "Why did I participate? I'm originally [ethnically] Azerbaijani, and I would like to have a part in this country's confident ascent in the history of Eurovision." He is 1/8th Azerbaijani, with his great-grandfather being an Iranian Azerbaijani.

== Personal life ==
Labbaf married his longtime fiancée, Behnaz Ansari, in Dubai in May 2011.

== Discography ==
Studio albums

- Arash (2005)
- Donya (2008)
- Superman (2014)

== Filmography ==
- 2005: Bluffmaster! as playback singer
- 2012: Rhinos Season as Son (as Twins/Male)

Awards and achievements
Preceded by Elnur & Samir with "Day After Day"	Azerbaijan in the Eurovision Song Contest (with AySel); 2009	Succeeded by Safura with "Drip Drop"
