= Last Hero: Champions vs Newcomers =

- Season 9
- Presented by: Yana Troyanova
- No. of days: 39
- No. of castaways: 17
- Winner: Roman Nikkel
- Runner-up: Elena Bartkova
- Location: Zanzibar Archipelago, Tanzania

Release
- Original network: TV-3
- Original release: 6 February – 1 May 2021

Season chronology
- ← Previous; Stars vs People Next → Stay as a Family

Last Hero: Champions vs Newcomers is the ninth season of the Russian reality television series Last Hero. The season is filmed in Zanzibar, Tanzania where 17 Russians compete against each other for food, immunity and the grand prize whilst surviving on abandoned islands for 39 days. The season started with a public vote of former players that determined who would return to the game and form one of the two tribes. The other tribe consisted of entirely new players, with a 'joker' joining at the merge where they're competing for the grand prize of 5,000,000₽.

The season was hosted for the third and final time by Yana Troyanova. The season premiered on 6 February 2021 and concluded on 1 May 2021 where Roman Nikkel won against Elena Bartkova in the final challenge to win the grand prize and the title of Sole Survivor.

== Contestants ==
List of Last Hero: Champions vs Newcomers contestants
Contestant	Original Tribe	Swapped Tribe	Merged Tribe	Finish
Elena Perova; 44, Moscow; Season 3	Champions			1st Voted Out; Day 3
Tatyana Root; 23, Krasnoyarsk	Newcomers			2nd Voted Out; Day 6
Aida Martirosyan; 37, Moscow; Actors vs Physics	Champions	Champions		3rd Voted Out; Day 9
Elmira Abdrazakova; 26, Moscow	Newcomers	Newcomers		Quit due to Injury; Day 10
Dimitri Pavlyuk; 26, Arkhangelskoye; Stars vs People	Champions	Newcomers		Medically evacuated Day 12
Danil Apos (Nikitin); 22, Moscow	Newcomers	Newcomers		4th Voted Out; Day 15
Dmitry Petaykin; 29, Saransk	Newcomers	Champions		5th Voted Out; Day 18
Ivan Kuznetsov; 29, Krasnoyarsk	Newcomers	Newcomers	Heroes	6th Voted Out; 1st Jury Member; Day 21
Anastasia Petrova; 20, Saint Petersburg			Heroes	7th Voted Out; 2nd Jury Member; Day 24
Aleksandr Matveev; 60, Moscow; End Game & Super Game	Champions	Champions	Heroes	Quit; 3rd Jury Member; Day 27
Roman Nikkel; Returned to Game	Newcomers	Newcomers	Heroes	8th Voted Out; Day 30
Nadezhda Angarskaya; 38, Moscow; Stars vs People	Champions	Champions	Heroes	Quit; 4th Jury Member; Day 32
Daria Kolpakova; 32, Yekaterinburg	Newcomers	Newcomers	Heroes	9th Voted Out; 5th Jury Member; Day 33
Aleksei Polikhun; 33, Obninsk; Lost in the Paradise	Champions	Champions	Heroes	10th Voted Out; 6th Jury Member; Day 36
Aleksandra Maslakova; 25, Moscow	Newcomers	Champions	Heroes	Lost Challenge; 7th Jury Member; Day 37
Denis Shvedov; 39, Moscow	Champions	Champions	Heroes	Lost Challenge; Day 38
Yelena Bartkova; 38, Moscow; Season 2 & Super Game	Champions	Newcomers	Heroes	Runner-up; Day 39
Roman Nikkel; 33, Ishalka	Newcomers	Newcomers	Heroes	Sole Survivor; Day 39

== Challenges ==
Episode	Air date	Challenges		Eliminated	Finish
Episode	Air date	Reward	Immunity	Eliminated	Finish
Episode 1	6 February 2021	Champions	Newcomers	Elena	1st Voted Out; Day 3
Episode 2	13 February 2021	Champions	Champions	Tatyana	2nd Voted Out; Day 6
Episode 3	20 February 2021	Champions	Newcomers	Aida	3rd Voted Out; Day 9
Episode 4	27 February 2021	Newcomers	Champions	Elmira	Quit due to Injury; Day 10
Episode 4	27 February 2021	Newcomers	Champions	Dimitri	Medically evacuated Day 12
Episode 5	6 March 2021	Champions	Champions	Danil	4th Voted Out; Day 15
Episode 6	13 March 2021	Newcomers	Newcomers	Dmitry	5th Voted Out; Day 18
Episode 7	20 March 2021	Newcomers	Denis; Nadezhda	Ivan	6th Voted Out; 1st Jury Member; Day 21
Episode 8	27 March 2021	Aleksandr, Anastasia, Daria, Denis	Yelena	Anastasia	7th Voted Out; 2nd Jury Member; Day 24
Episode 9	3 April 2021	Nadezhda [Denis, Elena B.]	Roman	Aleksandr	Quit; 3rd Jury Member; Day 27
Episode 10	10 April 2021	Denis [Aleksandra, Nadezhda]	Aleksandra	Roman	8th Voted Out; Day 30
Episode 11	17 April 2021	Nadezhda [Aleksei]	Roman	Nadezhda	Quit; 4th Jury Member; Day 32
Episode 11	17 April 2021	Nadezhda [Aleksei]	Roman	Daria	9th Voted Out; 5th Jury Member; Day 33
Episode 12	24 April 2021	Roman	Aleksandra	Aleksei	10th Voted Out; 6th Jury Member; Day 36
Episode 13	1 May 2021	N/A	Roman; Yelena; Denis	Aleksandra	Lost Challenge; 7th Jury Member; Day 37
Episode 13	1 May 2021	Roman; Yelena		Denis	Lost Challenge; Day 38
Episode 13	1 May 2021	None		Final Challenge	
Episode 13	1 May 2021	None		Yelena	Runner Up; Day 39
Episode 13	1 May 2021	None		Roman	Sole Survivor; Day 39
