= Last Hero: Russian Season =

2024 season of Russian television series

- Season 11
- Presented by: Kseniya Borodina
- No. of castaways: 14
- Winner: Dmitriy Konyshev
- Runner-up: Ivan Pyshnenko
- Location: Lake Teletskoye, Russia
- No. of episodes: 10

Release
- Original network: TV-3
- Original release: 29 June – 31 August 2024

Season chronology
- ← Previous; Stay as a Family

Last Hero: Russian Season is the eleventh season of the Russian reality television series Last Hero. For the first time, the season is filmed locally in Russia on the shores Lake Teletskoye. The season starts off with 12 Russians, some with notability compete in tribes of two against each other for food, tools and immunity competing for the grand prize of 5,000,000₽. Two intruders later enter the game, joining the two tribes.

Returning as presenter is Kseniya Borodina who leads the season, hosting challenges and tribal council. The season premiered on 29 June 2024 on TV-3.

== Contestants ==
Contestant	Original Tribe	Intruders Enter	Merged Tribe	Finish
Svetlana Masterkova; 56, Moscow; Former Professional Runner	Wolves			1st Voted Out; Day 3
Kristina Zakharova; 29, Pitkyaranta; New Boys Contestant	Wolves			Quit; Day 5
Artem Antipov; 31, Vsevolozhsk	Bears			2nd Voted Out; Day 6
Kseniya Surkova; 35, Moscow; Actress	Wolves	Wolves		3rd Voted Out; Day 9
Aleksandra Maslakova; 28, Krasnodar; Champions vs Newcomers	Bears	Bears		4th Voted Out; Day 12
Pavel Yarygin; Returned to Game	Bears	Bears		5th Voted Out; Day 15
Evgenia Iskandarova; 33, Moscow; Comedian		Bears		Quit; Day 15
Aleksandr Los; 36, Yenakiieve, Ukraine; Survive in Samarkand Winner	Wolves	Wolves	Snow Leopards	6th Voted Out; Day 18
Alan Tsarikaev; 44, Oryol	Bears	Bears	Snow Leopards	Lost Challenge; Day 20
Pavel Yarygin; 36, Saint Petersburg; TV Presenter	Bears	Bears	Snow Leopards	7th Voted out Day 21
David Niamedi; 29, Asipovichy, Belarus; TV Presenter	Wolves	Wolves	Snow Leopards	8th Voted Out; Day 24
Nadezhda Angarskaya; 41, Moscow; Stars vs People & Champions vs Newcomers		Wolves	Snow Leopards	9th Voted Out; Day 27
Nikolay Serdyukov; 35, Moscow; Blogger	Bears	Bears	Snow Leopards	Lost Challenge; Day 28
Ivan Pyshnenko; 42, Moscow; Comedian	Bears	Bears	Snow Leopards	Runner-up; Day 30
Dmitriy Konyshev; 34, Kemerovo; Comedian	Wolves	Wolves	Snow Leopards	Sole Survivor; Day 30

== Challenges ==
Episode	Air date	Challenges		Eliminated	Finish
Episode	Air date	Reward	Immunity	Eliminated	Finish
Episode 1	29 June 2024	Aleksandra; Kristina (Note: Although both tribes won flint, supplies and food. The reward challenge was to determine the leaders of the tribe. As Aleksandra and Kristina lasted the longest, they won and were now leaders of their tribes.)	Bears	Svetlana	1st Voted Out; Day 3
Episode 2	6 July 2024	Bears	Wolves	Kristina	Quit; Day 5
Episode 2	6 July 2024	Bears	Wolves	Artem	2nd Voted Out; Day 6
Episode 3	13 July 2024	Wolves	Bears	Kseniya	3rd Voted Out; Day 9
Episode 4	20 July 2024	Wolves & Bears	Wolves	Aleksandra	4th Voted Out; Day 12
Episode 5	27 July 2024	Bears	Wolves	Pavel	5th Voted Out; Day 15
Episode 6	3 August 2024	Aleksandr & Alan	Dmitriy	Evgenia	Quit; Day 15
Episode 6	3 August 2024	Aleksandr & Alan	Dmitriy	Aleksandr	6th Voted Out; Day 18
Episode 7	10 August 2024	Nadezhda (Nikolay)	David	Alan	Lost Challenge; Day 20
Episode 7	10 August 2024	Nadezhda (Nikolay)	David	Pavel	7th Voted Out; Day 21
Episode 8	17 August 2024	Nikolay (Nadezhda)	Dmitry	David	8th Voted Out; Day 24
Episode 9	24 August 2024	Nikolay	-	Nadezhda	9th Voted Out; Day 27
Episode 10	31 August 2024	Dmitriy, Ivan		Nikolay	Lost Challenge; Day 28
Episode 10	31 August 2024	Final Challenge		Ivan	Runner-up; Day 30
Episode 10	31 August 2024	Final Challenge		Dmitriy	Sole Survivor; Day 30

== Voting history ==
#	Original Tribe			Intruders Enter				Merge Tribe											
Episode	1	2		3	4		5	6		7		8		9			10		
Voted out	Svetlana	Kristina	Artem	Kseniya	Nikolay	Aleksandra	Pavel	Evgenia	Aleksandr	Alan	Pavel	David		Nadezhda			Nikolay	Ivan	Dmitry
Votes	5-1	Quit	5-1	2-1-1-1	4-2	3-2-1	3-1-1	Quit	5-2-1	Lost Challenge	5-1	2-2-1	2-1	2-2-1	5-5-1	2-0	Challenge	Final Challenge	
Dmitry	Svetlana			Aleksandr					Aleksandr	Saved	Pavel	Nikolay	Nikolay	Nadezhda	-	No vote	Won	Won	
Ivan			Artem		Aleksandra	Aleksandra	Pavel		Aleksandr	Saved	Pavel	David	David	Dmitry	-	Nadezhda	Won	Lost	
Nikolay			Artem		Aleksandra	Aleksandra	Pavel		Aleksandr	Saved	Pavel	David	No vote	Dmitry	-	Nadezhda	Lost		
Nadezhda				Kseniya					Pavel	1st	Pavel	Ivan	David	Ivan (+1)	+2?	No vote			
David	Svetlana			Kseniya					Pavel	Saved	Pavel	Nikolay	No vote		Dmitry				
Pavel			Artem		~~Nikolay~~	Aleksandra	Evgenia	Returned	Aleksandr	Saved	Nadezhda				Nadezhda				
Alan			Artem		~~Nikolay~~	Pavel	Pavel		Aleksandr	Eliminated					Nadezhda				
Aleksandr	Svetlana			David					Nikolai						Dmitry				
Evgenia					~~Nikolay~~	Pavel	Ivan	Walked							No vote				
Aleksandra			Artem		~~Nikolay~~	Ivan									Dmitry				
Kseniya	Svetlana			Dmitriy											Nikolay				
Artem			Nikolay												Dmitry				
Kristina	Svetlana														Dmitry				
Svetlana	Kristina														Nadezhda				

Nadezhda loses the first test and will receive an extra vote in the tribal council. When tied, the presenter decides that the eliminated contestants vote for their expelled and these votes are added to those already cast. He says that there is a tie After the tie, the expulsion is decided by the two finalist contestants
