= Football Review =

- Футбольное обозрение
- Starring: Vladimir Pereturin; Vladimir Maslachenko
- Country of origin: Soviet Union (1980-1991); Russia (1991-1999)
- No. of episodes: 900+

Production
- Running time: 23-28 minutes

Original release
- Network: Channel One Russia
- Release: October 19, 1980

Football Review (Russian: Футбольное обозрение, romanized: Futbolynoe obozrenie) was a weekly sports telecast from the Soviet Union and later Russia, dedicated to the latest sports events at home and abroad. It was typically broadcast on Sundays with a half-hour format. It aired frequently during the European and World Championships, and less so in the winter break domestic championship of the USSR in 1992 — the championship of Russia.

Broadcast premiere was held October 19, 1980. The audience were offered excerpts from six matches of the 28th round of the 43rd championship of the USSR. It was shown with 21 goals repeats.

Over the years at shows were different leading and the most frequent was Vladimir Pereturin rarely Vladimir Maslachenko.

In the 1990s it was temporarily renamed as Goal!. The hosts of Goal! were Vladimir Pereturin, Vladimir Maslachenko, Georgy Sarkisyants, Vladimir Topilsky, Yuri Pankratov and Vasily Konov.

For many years it was the only broadcast on Soviet television solely dedicated to football. Football Transfer began with a march by Matvey Blanter and ended with the melody Lily Was Here by Candy Dulfer and Dave Stewart.

Last time in the program published in December 1999, in March 2000, instead of it began to leave the program Football Time (2000 — On a Football) by Viktor Gusev, pay attention mainly to the Russian Cup. The program lasted until the autumn of 2004.

From 15 March 2011 to 13 March 2012 appeared on the transmission portal of the newspaper Sovetsky Sport, entitled Football Review with Vladimir Pereturin.
