= Last Hero 3 =

- Season 3
- Presented by: Nikolai Fomenko
- No. of days: 39
- No. of castaways: 19
- Winner: Vladimir Presnyakov, Jr.
- Runner-up: Elena Perova
- Location: Dominican Republic
- No. of episodes: 13

Release
- Original network: Channel One
- Original release: 1 February – 26 April 2003

Season chronology
- ← Previous; Last Hero 2 Next → End Game

Last Hero 3 (Russian: Последний герой 3, Posledniy Geroy 3) was the third season of Russian Last Hero show, hosted by Nikolai Fomenko.

== Contestants ==
Contestant	Original tribe	Switched tribe	Merged tribe	Finish	Total votes
Elena Kondulainen; 44.the actress	Pelicans			1st Voted Out; Day 3	5
Kris Kelmi; 47.the singer	Barracudas			2nd Voted Out; Day 6	1
Aleksandr Pashutin; 60.the actor	Barracudas			3rd Voted Out; Day 9	7
Igor' Livanov; 49.the actor	Pelicans			Eliminated; Day 11	0
Dana Borisova; 26.the TV presenter	Pelicans	Barracudas		4th Voted Out; Day 12	5
Aleksandr Byalko; 50.the physicist	Pelicans	Barracudas		5th Voted Out; Day 15	6
Tatyana Dogileva; 45.the actress	Pelicans	Barracudas		6th Voted Out; Day 18	3
Tatyana Ovsiyenko; 36.the singer	Barracudas	Pelicans		Eliminated; Day 19	1
Viktor Gusev; 47.the sport commentator	Pelicans	Pelicans	Crocodiles	7th Voted Out; 1st Jury Member; Day 21	6
Ivan Demidov; 39.the TV presenter	Barracudas	Pelicans	Crocodiles	Eliminated; 2nd Jury Member; Day 23	3
Elena Proklova; 49.the TV presenter	Pelicans	Barracudas	Crocodiles	8th Voted Out; 3rd Jury Member; Day 24	4
Marina Aleksandrova; 20.the actress	Barracudas	Pelicans	Crocodiles	9th Voted Out; 4th Jury Member; Day 27	6
Ivars Kalniņš; 54.the actor			Crocodiles	10th Voted Out; 5th Jury Member; Day 30	3
Vera Glagoleva; 46.the actress			Crocodiles	11th Voted Out; 6th Jury Member; Day 33	4
Larisa Verbitskaya; 43.the TV presenter	Barracudas	Pelicans	Crocodiles	12th Voted Out; 7th Jury Member; Day 36	11
Aleksandr Lykov; 41.the actor	Barracudas	Barracudas	Crocodiles	13th Voted Out; 8th Jury Member; Day 37	6
Olga Orlova; 25.the singer	Barracudas	Baracudas	Crocodiles	Eliminated; 9th Jury Member; Day 38	10
Elena Perova; 26.the singer	Pelicans	Pelicans	Crocodiles	Runner-Up	2
Vladimir Presnyakov Jr. 34.the singer	Pelicans	Pelicans	Crocodiles	Sole Survivor	6

The Total Votes is the number of votes a castaway has received during Tribal Councils where the castaway is eligible to be voted out of the game. It does not include the votes received during the final Tribal Council.
