= Vladislav Panchenko =

Russian Scientist

- Владислав Панченко
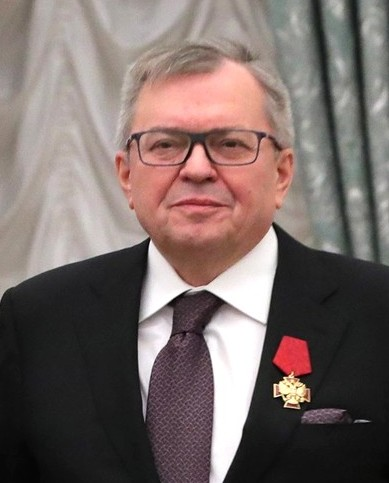
- Pachenko in November 2018

Chairman of the Higher Attestation Commission
- Incumbent
- Assumed office 13 June 2024
- Preceded by: Vladimir Filippov

Personal details
- Born: 15 September 1947 (age 79)
- Died: Moscow, Soviet Union
- Education: Moscow State University

Vladislav Yakovlevich Panchenko (Russian: Владислав Яковлевич Панченко; born 15 September 1947) is a Soviet and Russian scientist in the field of laser information technology, scientific instrumentation, nonlinear optics and medical physics, Doctor of Physical and Mathematical Sciences, Professor, Academician of the Russian Academy of Sciences (2008). Chairman of the Higher Attestation Commission of the Russian Federation, Scientific Director of the Institute of Laser and Information Technology Problems of the Russian Academy of Sciences (ILIT RAS).

== Biography ==
He graduated from the Physics Department of Moscow State University in 1971, and completed his postgraduate studies there in 1974.

In 1975, he defended his PhD thesis, "Kinetics of Gas Molecule Dissociation under Excitation of Vibrations by Laser Radiation" at the Physics Department of Moscow State University. In 1990, he defended his doctoral thesis, "Nonlinear Absorption of High-Power IR Laser Radiation and Energy Relaxation in Vibrationally Excited Gases."

Since 1985, he has worked at the Institute of Laser and Information Technologies of the Russian Academy of Sciences (IPLT RAS), serving as a department head, division head, and deputy director for research. From 1992 to 2016, he served as director, and is currently the scientific director.

In 1994, he was awarded the academic title of professor. On May 26, 2000, he was elected a Corresponding Member of the Russian Academy of Sciences in the Department of Informatics, Computer Engineering, and Automation (Information Technology and Telecommunications).

Since 2006, he has been Director of the Institute of Molecular Physics at the Kurchatov Institute (in parallel with his work at the Institute of Optical Information Technologies).

On May 28, 2008, he was elected an Academician of the Russian Academy of Sciences in the specialty "nanoelectronics and optical information technologies".

In 2008, he was appointed Chairman of the Council of the Russian Foundation for Basic Research. In 2010, he became a member of the Advisory Scientific Council of the Skolkovo Foundation.

Since 2019, he has been Acting Deputy Academician-Secretary and Head of the Nanotechnology Section at the Kurchatov Institute of the Russian Academy of Sciences. He is also Chairman of the RAS Scientific Council "Fundamental Problems of Nanostructures and Nanotechnologies" (since 2021).

Panchenko heads the Department of Medical Physics at the Physics Faculty of Moscow State University, where he developed and teaches lecture courses on the fundamental principles of laser technology and medical physics.

Since June 13, 2024, he has served as Chairman of the Higher Attestation Commission of the Russian Federation.

== Election to the Russian Academy of Sciences ==
In March 2017, he ran for President of the Russian Academy of Sciences. However, immediately before the election, he withdrew his candidacy (as did the other two candidates, V. E. Fortov and A. A. Makarov), and the elections were postponed until the fall. All three candidates agreed that the RAS Charter's deficiencies in regulating the presidential election procedure needed to be addressed.

At the end of April 2017, the Bureau of the RAS Division of Nanotechnology nominated Panchenko as its candidate for the September presidential elections of the Academy. He completed the approval process with the Russian government, as prescribed by the new rules. Between March and September, scientists expressed polarized opinions on Vladislav Panchenko's chances: from the view that he was "close to the [Russian Federation] presidential administration thanks to his relationship with <…> Mikhail Kovalchuk" through the Kurchatov Institute and had "the greatest chance of winning," to a very low assessment of his chances and condemnation for re-nomination.

Following the first round of elections on September 26, in which only five academicians were admitted, he took fourth place with 204 votes out of 1,596 and did not advance to the second round. The BBC Russian Service characterized this result and the election of Alexander Sergeev as President of the Russian Academy of Sciences as "the Kovalchuks lost". Nevertheless, Panchenko was elected to the new Presidium of the Russian Academy of Sciences in 2017.

His son is entrepreneur Yakov Panchenko, co-owner of the firm "Debruss". His daughter-in-law is Olga Panchenko, daughter of entrepreneur Vladimir Alyoshin.

== Academic research ==
Vladislav Panchenko is a specialist in laser physics, nonlinear optics, laser information technology, nanotechnology, and medical physics. He has conducted pioneering work in the physics of laser-matter interactions and created new laser information and technological systems, including for medical applications. Under his leadership, unique systems for the remote fabrication of individual implants and biomodels based on tomographic data from preoperative patient examinations transmitted via a high-speed internet connection to a rapid prototyping center were developed. He also developed original laser rapid prototyping systems, including stereolithography units, selective sintering of micro- and nanopowders, and purification in supercritical fluids.

Preoperative biomodeling technologies developed with Panchenko's participation have been implemented in neurosurgery, oncology, and reconstructive surgery. Pre-planning of surgeries using plastic biomodels significantly reduces time and improves treatment outcomes in oncology, neurosurgery, maxillofacial surgery, reconstructive surgery, and other fields, and has opened up new possibilities in pediatric surgery.

A group led by Vladislav Panchenko has created a new generation of intelligent laser surgical systems that can determine in real time the type of tissue being removed and the boundaries of the surgical site. These systems offer new opportunities for minimally invasive and organ-preserving surgeries.

== Awards ==
- Honored Scientist of the Russian Federation (1997)
- Honorary Member (Fellow) of the International Society for Optical Engineering SPIE (2002).
- Laureate of the Russian Federation Government Prize in Science and Technology (2004)
- Order of Friendship (May 26, 2008) — for achievements in work and many years of fruitful work
- Laureate of the State Prize of the Russian Federation for 2009
- Recipient of the Award of the Governor of Moscow Oblast "For Usefulness" (2012)
- Knight of the Legion of Honour (2014, France)
- Order "For Merit to the Fatherland", 4th class (February 1, 2018) — for significant contribution to the development of science and many years of dedicated work
- Gratitude from the Head of the Republic of Dagestan (May 1, 2023) — for significant contribution to the development of science and many years of dedicated work
- Order "For Merit to the Fatherland," 3rd class (February 5, 2024) — for significant contribution to the development of Russian science, many years of dedicated work fruitful activity and in connection with the 300th anniversary of the founding of the Russian Academy of Sciences
