= Last Hero 4: End Game =

Series of the 'Last Hero' television show

- Season 4
- Presented by: Aleksandr Domogarov
- No. of days: 34
- No. of castaways: 20
- Winner: Yana Volkova
- Runner-up: Zhanna Friske
- Location: Panama
- No. of episodes: 12

Release
- Original network: Channel One
- Original release: 11 October – 27 December 2003

Season chronology
- ← Previous; Last Hero 3 Next → Super Game

Last Hero 4: End Game (Russian: Последний герой 4: Конец игры, Posledny Geroy 4: Konets Igry) - 4th season of Russian Last Hero show, hosted by Aleksandr Domogarov.

== Contestants ==
Contestant	Original tribe	Switched tribe	Merged tribe	Finish	Total votes
Sergei Krylov, 42	Scorpions			Quit; Day 1	0
Valery Danilin	Scorpions			1st Voted Out; Day 3	4
Yulia Nachalova, 22	Iguanas			2nd Voted Out; Day 6	0
Maria Butyrskaya, 31	Iguanas			3rd Voted Out; Day 9	5
Kirill Tolmatsky, 20	Scorpions	Iguanas		4th Voted Out; Day 12	6
Marina Gryaznova	Iguanas	Iguanas		5th Voted Out; Day 15	5
Sergey "Cat" Tarasov, 28	Scorpions	Scorpions		6th Voted Out; Day 18	4
Svetlana Yastrebova; 29, Moscow	Iguanas	Iguanas		7th Voted Out; Day 21	11
Lika Star, 30	Iguanas	Scorpions		Eliminated; Day 22	6
Yekaterina Vdovitsenko, 22	Iguanas	Scorpions	Boas	8th Voted Out; 1st Jury Member; Day 24	0
Sergey Tugolukov; 34, Perm	Scorpions	Iguanas	Boas	9th Voted Out; 2nd Jury Member; Day 26	9
Vitaly Fyodorov, 27	Scorpions	Scorpions	Boas	10th Voted Out; 3rd Jury Member; Day 29	5
Vlad Stashevsky, 29	Scorpions	Scorpions	Boas	Eliminated; 4th Jury Member; Day 30	6
Nikolai Drozdov, 66	Scorpions	Iguanas	Boas	11th Voted Out; 5th Jury Member; Day 31	6
Anna Zhdannikova; 23, Moscow	Iguanas	Scorpions	Boas	Eliminated; 6th Jury Member; Day 32	3
Maksim Pokrovsky, 35	Scorpions	Iguanas	Boas	Eliminated; 7th Jury Member; Day 33	1
Aleksandr Matveev; 44, Moscow	Scorpions	Scorpions	Boas	Eliminated; 8th Jury Member; Day 34	8
Yekaterina Semyonova, 32	Iguanas	Iguanas	Boas	2nd Runner-Up; Day 34	5
Zhanna Friske, 29	Iguanas	Scorpions	Boas	Runner-Up; Day 34	3
Yana Volkova; 40, Saint Petersburg	Iguanas	Iguanas	Boas	Sole Survivor; Day 34	6

The Total Votes is the number of votes a castaway has received during Tribal Councils where the castaway is eligible to be voted out of the game. It does not include the votes received during the final Tribal Council.
