= Last Hero 7: Lost in the Paradise =

- Season 7
- Presented by: Ksenia Sobchak
- No. of days: 37
- No. of castaways: 21
- Winner: Vladimir Lysenko
- Runner-up: Yuliya Kovalchuk
- Location: Panama, Bocas del Toro Province
- No. of episodes: 14

Release
- Original release: 16 November 2008 – 1 March 2009

Season chronology
- ← Previous; Heart of Africa Next → Actors vs Physics

Last Hero 7: Lost in the Paradise (Russian: Последний герой 7: Забытые в Раю, Posledniy Geroy 6: Zabytyje v Rayu) was the seventh season of Russian television series Last Hero, a franchised version of Expedition Robinson, better known as Survivor, hosted by Ksenia Sobchak. 21 contestants took part and competed against each other for 37 days to try and outlast each other to become the Sole Survivor.

== Contestants ==
Contestant	Mixed tribe	Original tribe	Merged tribe	Finish	Total votes against
Nikita Djigurda; 47, Kyiv, Ukraine	Mixed Tribe			Quit; Day 1	0
Victor Erofeyev; 61, Moscow	Mixed Tribe			Quit; Day 1	0
Alexandr Polovtsev; 50, Saint Petersburg	Mixed Tribe			Eliminated; Day 1	0
Olga Tsarkova; 42, Moscow	Mixed Tribe			1st Voted Out; Day 4	3
Kristina "Helga" Kruger; 22, Bonn, Germany	Mixed Tribe			2nd Voted Out; Day 7	5
Evelina Blyodans; 39, Yalta, Ukraine	Mixed Tribe	Fire		3rd Voted Out; Day 10	4
Liliya Sharykina; 19, Zelenograd	Mixed Tribe	Fire		4th Voted Out; Day 13	6
Victoria Lopyreva; 25, Rostov-on-Don	Mixed Tribe	Water		5th Voted Out; Day 16	8
Cornelia Mango; 22, Astrakhan	Mixed Tribe	Fire		6th Voted Out; Day 19	4
Olga Kostrova; 32, Saint Petersburg	Mixed Tribe	Fire		7th Voted Out; Day 22	9
Tatiana Gerasimova; 27, Moscow	Mixed Tribe	Water		8th Voted Out; Day 25	4
Mikhail Grushevskiy; 43, Moscow	Mixed Tribe	Water	Terra Incognita	Eliminated; Day 27	3
Yaroslav Lazarev; 19, Moscow	Mixed Tribe	Water	Terra Incognita	9th Voted Out; 1st Jury Member; Day 28	6
Aleksei Polikhun; 21, Obninsk	Mixed Tribe	Fire	Terra Incognita	10th Voted Out; 2nd Jury Member; Day 31	5
Andrei Reznik; 32, Grodno, Belarus	Mixed Tribe	Fire	Terra Incognita	Eliminated; 3rd Jury Member; Day 33	0
Oleg Pavlovich; 44, Moscow	Mixed Tribe	Water	Terra Incognita	11th Voted Out; 4th Jury Member; Day 34	5
Lyudmila Limarenko; 51, Moscow	Mixed Tribe	Fire	Terra Incognita	Eliminated; 5th Jury Member; Day 35	7
Tair Mamedov; 27, Baku, Azerbaijan	Mixed Tribe	Fire	Terra Incognita	Eliminated; 6th Jury Member; Day 36	3
Anna Shapiro; 36, Saratov	Mixed Tribe	Water	Terra Incognita	Eliminated; 7th Jury Member; Day 37	4
Yuliya Kovalchuk; 25, Volzhsky	Mixed Tribe	Fire	Terra Incognita	Runner Up; Day 37	1
Vladimir Lysenko; 33, Moscow	Mixed Tribe	Water	Terra Incognita	Sole Survivor; Day 37	2

The Total Votes is the number of votes a castaway has received during Tribal Councils where the castaway is eligible to be voted out of the game. It does not include the votes received during the final Tribal Council.
