= Last Hero 1 =

- Season 1
- Presented by: Sergei Bodrov, Jr.
- No. of days: 39
- No. of castaways: 16
- Winner: Sergey Odintsov
- Runner-up: Ivan Lyubimenko
- Location: Panama
- No. of episodes: 13

Release
- Original network: Channel One
- Original release: 17 November 2001 – 9 February 2002

Season chronology
- Next → Last Hero 2

Last Hero 1 (Russian: «Последний герой 1», Posledniy Geroy 1) was the first season of Russian Last Hero reality show, hosted by Sergei Bodrov, Jr.

== Contestants ==
Contestant	Original tribe	Merged tribe	Finish	Total votes
Yelena Kravchenko; 34, Odessa	Lizards		1st voted out Day 3	5
Olga Korchevskaya; 23, Kyiv	Turtles		2nd voted out Day 6	4
Boris Ivanov; 63, Omsk	Turtles		3rd voted out Day 9	5
Aleksandr Morozov; 43, Saint Petersburg	Lizards		4th voted out Day 12	5
Sergey Tereshchenko; 26, Moscow	Turtles		5th voted out Day 15	4
Irina Furman; 31, Kyiv	Lizards		6th voted out Day 18	3
Nadezhda Semyonova; 38, Balashikha	Turtles	Sharks	7th voted out Day 21	6
Igor Perfilyev; 44, Zelenograd	Turtles	Sharks	8th voted out 1st jury member Day 24	8
Snezhanna Knyazeva; 25, Kazan	Lizards	Sharks	9th voted out 2nd jury member Day 27	10
Aleksandr Tselovansky; 43, Kyiv	Lizards	Sharks	10th voted out 3rd jury member Day 30	10
Natalya Ten; 27, Samara	Turtles	Sharks	11th voted out 4th jury member Day 33	12
Sergey Sakin; 24, Moscow	Lizards	Sharks	12th voted out 5th jury member Day 36	5
Anna Modestova; 23, Moscow	Turtles	Sharks	13th voted out 6th jury member Day 37	4
Inna Gomes; 31, Moscow	Lizards	Sharks	14th voted out 7th jury member Day 38	6
Ivan Lyubimenko; 19, Volgograd	Turtles	Sharks	runner-up Day 39	0
Sergey Odintsov; 26, Kursk	Lizards	Sharks	Sole Survivor; Day 39	3

The total votes is the number of votes a castaway has received during Tribal Councils where the castaway is eligible to be voted out of the game. It does not include the votes received during the final Tribal Council.
