= Candidate of Sciences =

PhD-equivalent scientific degree in Soviet Union and post-Soviet countries

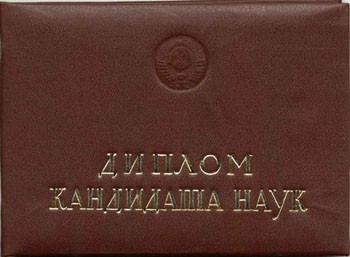
Cover of a Soviet Candidate of Sciences diploma

A Candidate of Sciences (Note: Russian: кандидат наук, romanized: kandidat nauk, Ukrainian: кандидат наук, romanized: kandydat nauk, Kazakh: ғылым кандидаты, romanized: ğylym kandidaty, Belarusian: кандыдат навук, romanized: kandydat navuk, Czech: kandidát věd, Slovak: kandidát vied) is a PhD-equivalent academic research degree established by the Soviet Union. Since the 1990s, it has been replaced by a Doctor of Philosophy degree in many post-soviet Central and Eastern European countries, but is still offered in others, particularly Russia. It is officially classified by UNESCO as ISCED level 8: doctoral or equivalent. In countries that confer a Candidate of Sciences degree, a more advanced degree, Doctor of Sciences, is usually conferred as a higher doctorate.

The Candidate of Sciences degree may be recognized as a Doctor of Philosophy, usually in natural sciences, by scientific institutions in other countries.

== Overview ==
The degree was introduced in the USSR by the Council of People's Commissars of the USSR on 13 January 1934, all previous degrees, ranks and titles having been abolished after the October Revolution in 1917, which viewed academic distinctions and ranks as remnants of capitalist inequality to be permanently eliminated. The introduction of the Candidate of Sciences degree also re-recognized some degrees earned prior to 1917 in Tsarist Russia and elsewhere.

To attain the Candidate of Sciences degree, an individual must hold a Master's (Magistr) or a Specialist diploma, both one or (more typically) two year degrees in this system. Both of these prerequisites are post-Bachelor's (Bakalavr) degrees. The Candidate of Sciences degree requires a minimum of three years full-time study, during which the individual must conduct and publish their advanced original research into a topic that is deemed significant or has practical economic or military potential.

In order to attain the rank of full Professor in countries that award a Candidate of Science, a Doctor of Sciences degree is also required in the same way that habilitation is required in Germany. This is also sometimes the case in the United States and the United Kingdom, where in addition to the possession of a doctoral (Ph.D.) degree, some volume of further research must be demonstrated.

== Procedure for attaining the degree ==
Cover of a Russian Candidate of Sciences diploma

The work on a dissertation is commonly carried out during a postgraduate study period called aspirantura. Not all those who undertake aspirantura will be invited to write a dissertation. An analogous situation may be found in American institutions where, after comprehensive examinations, a student may obtain a terminal master's degree and not continue with a dissertation. Aspirantura is performed within either an educational institution (such as a university) or a scientific research institution (such as an institute from the Russian Academy of Sciences network). It can also be carried out without a direct connection to the academy. In exceptional cases, the Candidate of Sciences degree may be awarded on the basis of published scholarly works alone. In experimental sciences, the dissertation is based on an independent research project conducted under the supervision of a professor, the results of which must be published in at least three papers in peer-review scientific journals.

Taking courses in philosophy and foreign language and passing a qualifying examination called a Candidate Minimum are prerequisites. In the Soviet Union, the Candidate Minimum included exams in the specialty field of the dissertant, a foreign language of his/her choice, and an exam in scientific communism. In post-Soviet Russia and other post-Soviet states, the exam in scientific communism was replaced by one in philosophy, and, most recently, Russia replaced it with an exam in the history and philosophy of science. In Ukraine, it was replaced with an exam in philosophy.

The dissertation is presented (defended) before a committee called the Dissertation Council, which is accredited at the educational or scientific institution. The Council consists of about 20 members who are the leading specialists (including the academicians) in the field of the dissertation who have been selected and empowered to serve in this capacity. The summary of the dissertation must be published before the public defense in the form of autoreferat, about 150–200 copies distributed to major research organizations and libraries. The seeker of the degree must have an official research supervisor. The dissertation must be delivered together with official references of several reviewers, called "opponents". In a procedure called the Defense of the Dissertation, the dissertation is summarized before the commission, followed by speeches from the opponents or the reading of their references. The aspirant then replies to the opponents' comments and answers the Council members' questions.

If the defense is successful (approved by a 2/3 majority in secret ballot voting by the members of the council), the dissertation and approval are submitted to the central statewide board called the Higher Attestation Commission (Vysshaya attestatsionnaya komissiya (VAK)), or to a similar authority in other applicable countries, which must confirm the degree. However, since the 2010s, the dissertation councils accredited at some world-renowned educational programs like those at Moscow and St. Petersburg State universities, as well as top-level research centers, are exempt from the requirement to send defended dissertations to the VAK for confirmation. As of 2021, there were 29 such exempt organizations (full list).

== Variations ==
=== Former Czechoslovakia ===
In Czechoslovakia, the Candidate of Sciences (Czech: kandidát věd, Slovak: kandidát vied) and Doctor of Sciences (Czech: doktor věd, Slovak: doktor vied) degrees were modeled precisely after the Soviet system through Law 60/1953, passed in 1953. Requirements to attain the degree were thus the same as in the USSR. Since all Czechoslovak top academic research institutions were dissolved after the Communist Putsch in 1948, the supreme academic authority was the Czechoslovak Academy of Sciences, newly established in 1953. The degree could also be awarded by the Slovak Academy of Sciences and universities.

The abbreviation of the degree is CSc. (Latin: candidatus scientiarum), added behind the bearer's name after a comma.

There have been other academic degrees in Czechoslovakia and its successional states that incorporate the "Dr." abbreviation, e.g.:

- JUDr. (Latin: juris utriusque doctor, English: Doctor of Law, Czech: doktor práv, Slovak: doktor práv)
- PhDr. (Latin: philosophiae doctor, English: Doctor of Philosophy, Czech: doktor filosofie, Slovak: doktor filozofie)
- RNDr. (Latin: rerum naturalium doctor, English: Doctor of Natural Sciences, Czech: doktor přírodních věd, Slovak: doktor prírodných vied)

and others. These doctor degrees are not to be confused with a Ph.D., although its holders are addressed as "doctor." Applicants need a masters degree (5 years +) or a comparable degree with excellent grades. This degree is stated before names and awarded after writing a rigorous thesis of 50,000 to 80,000 words and defending it at a viva voce exam in at least 2-3 related fields of doctoral studies.

- RSDr. (Latin: rerum socialium doctor) was a quasi-degree, awarded exclusively to functionaries of the Communist Party of Czechoslovakia (KSČ) during the Communist era, whether or not they had "graduated" from the Political College of the Central Committee of the Communist Party of Czechoslovakia. The leading subject taught was Marxism-Leninism and there was no need to have completed even a secondary school to attain the degree. RSDr. was also possible to attain at some military universities, however, contrary to the previous case, the applicant had to pass further exams.
- MUDr. (Latin: medicinae universae doctor) is a "Doctor of Medicine" degree equivalent to the North-American MD, attained after 6-year university studies.
- MVDr. (Latin: medicinae veterinariae doctor) is a "Doctor of Veterinary" akin to DVM.

=== Czechia ===
Granting CSc. was abolished in 1998 and replaced with Ph.D. or Th.D. (Czech: doktor) An applicant is required to have masters degree (or its equivalent, e.g. Engineer (Ing.) in technical and economic university programs, or Doctor of Medicine (MUDr.), Doctor of Veterinary Medicine (MVDr.) in medical university programs), enroll in an approximately three-year post-graduate program, and defend their dissertation before a panel of expert examiners appointed by the university.

=== Slovakia ===
The Candidate of Science degree was abolished in 1996 and replaced with PhD. (Slovak: doktor, in Latin: philosophiae doctor). Requirements are similar to the Czech system.

=== Poland ===
Since the medieval period, Polish tradition was to call any Ph.D. equivalent doktor, though for a short period of time between 1951 and 1958, the communist government tried to replace the title of doktor with kandydat nauk (Candidate of Science) to follow the Soviet model.

=== Former Soviet Union, Russia, Belarus ===
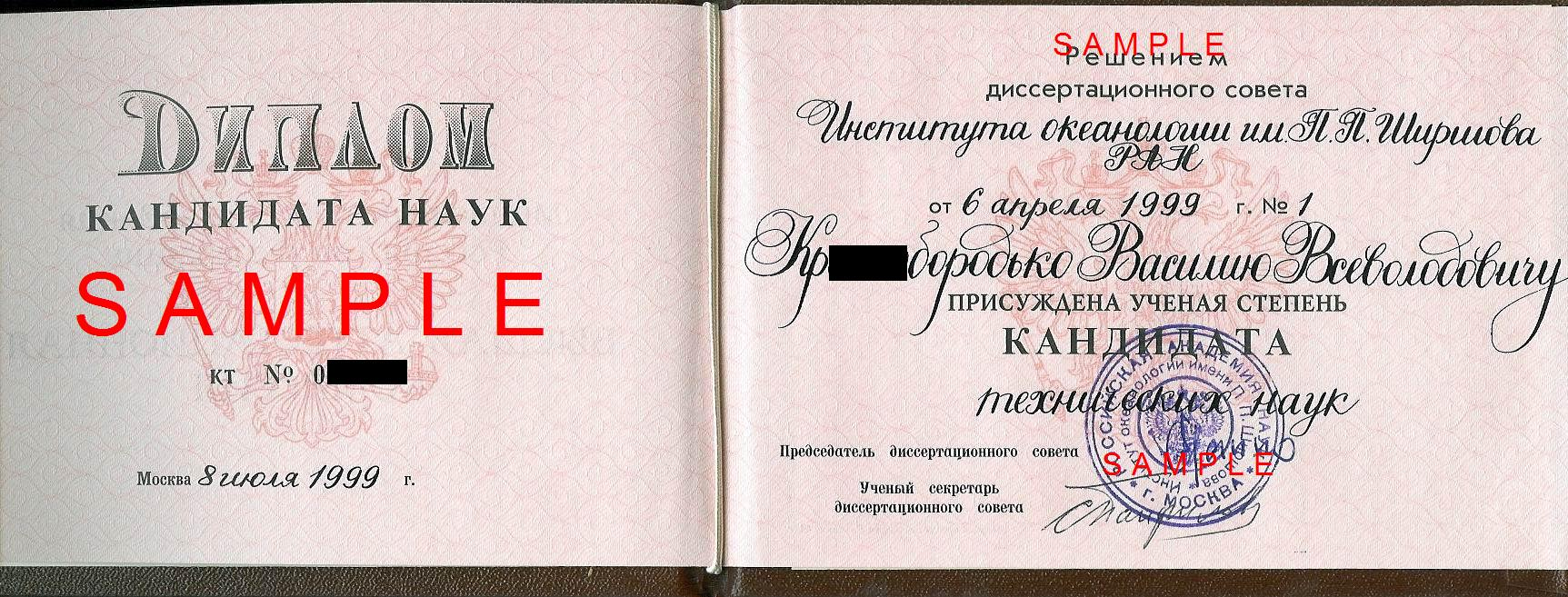
Sample contents of modern Candidate of Sciences diploma (here, Candidate of Engineering Sciences), 1999

In the USSR, at least three original scientific papers published and/or submitted are required for completion. At least one paper is required to appear in one of the journals listed by the Higher Attestation Commission (VAK) of the Ministry of Science and Higher Education. In Belarus, all three publications must be published in the journals listed by the VAK.

In 1971, there were 249,200 scientists holding a Candidate degree.

According to the official Guidelines for the Recognition of Russian Qualifications in Other Countries, in countries with a two-tier system of doctoral degrees, the degree of Candidate of Sciences should be considered to be equivalent to the first level of that nation's doctoral degree. In countries with only one doctoral degree, the degree of Candidate of Sciences should be considered an equivalent to this degree.

=== Kazakhstan ===
Kazakhstan previously followed the Soviet two-tier academic degree system which included the Candidate of Sciences (Kazakh: ғылым кандидаты) and Doctor of Sciences (Kazakh: ғылым докторы), awarded and recognized by the Higher Attestation Commission under the Ministry of Education and Science of Kazakhstan (VAK RK). Following the country's accession to the Bologna Process in 2010, Kazakhstan transitioned to the terminal degree system, formally abolishing the Candidate of Sciences degree in 2011 through Order No. 127 by the Minister of Education and Science: On Approval of the Rules for Awarding Degrees. The new system now recognizes Doctor of Philosophy (Kazakh: доктор) and Doctor of Profile degrees, aligning with international standards.

Although the Candidate of Sciences degree is no longer awarded, individuals who hold this qualification may still receive recognition for their academic accomplishments in Kazakhstan, depending on the field and institution.

=== Ukraine ===
In 2014, with the adoption of the new Law of Ukraine On Higher Education, the degree of Candidate of Sciences was replaced with the degree of Doctor of Philosophy (PhD). According to the new law, the degree of Candidate of Sciences is equivalent to a PhD. This information is included in Candidate of Sciences diplomas issued after 2014.

In 2015, graduate students were enrolled in the Candidate of Sciences programs for the last time. The form "Candidate of Science" (singular) is used on the English-language page of bilingual diplomas of Candidate of Sciences issued after 2014 (until 2014, the Candidate of Sciences diplomas in Ukraine contained Ukrainian text only).

As of 2024, those who were enrolled in the Candidate of Sciences programs until 2015 still may defend their theses and obtain the Candidate of Sciences degree.

== Fields of Science ==
Depending on their specialty and research in their dissertation, a student in Russia can be awarded a Candidate of Sciences in one of the following fields:

- agricultural sciences (abbr.: к. с.-х. н.);
- architecture (abbr.: к. арх.);
- art criticism (abbr.: к. иск.);
- biological sciences (abbr.: к. б. н.);
- chemical sciences (abbr.: к. х. н.);
- culturology (abbr.: {{lang|ru|к. культ.);
- economic sciences (abbr.: к. э. н.);
- engineering sciences (abbr.: к. т. н.);
- geographic sciences (abbr.: к. геогр. н.);
- geologo-mineralogical sciences (abbr.: к. г.-м. н.) [in the USSR, Russia, and Belarus] or geological sciences (abbr.: к. геол. н.) [in Ukraine];
- historical sciences (abbr.: к. ист. н.);
- juridical sciences (abbr.: к. ю. н.);
- medical sciences (abbr.: к. м. н.);
- military sciences (abbr.: к. воен. н.);
- pedagogic sciences (abbr.: к. пед. н.);
- pharmaceutical sciences (abbr.: к. фарм. н.);
- philological sciences (abbr.: к. филол. н.);
- philosophical sciences (abbr.: к. филос. н.);
- physico-mathematical sciences (abbr.: к. ф.-м. н.);
- political sciences (abbr.: к. полит. н.);
- psychological sciences (abbr.: к. пс. н.);
- sociological sciences (abbr.: к. соц. н.);
- state administration (abbr.: к. н. держ. упр.) [only in Ukraine];
- theology (abbr.: к. богосл.) [only in Russia];
- veterinary sciences (abbr.: к. ветеринар. н.).

Previously, a degree in "naval sciences" (abbr.: к. воен.-мор. н.) existed. For some time in the 1940s, the degree of "candidate of art criticism sciences" (abbr.: к. иск. н.) also existed.

Some specialties permit awarding the candidate degree in several branches of science, depending on the dominant subject area of the dissertation; e.g., specialty 02.00.04 (physical chemistry) can be awarded to a candidate of physics, technical, or chemical sciences. However, for each dissertation, only one branch of science can be chosen.

== See also ==
- Doctor of Philosophy
- Doktor nauk
- Education in Belarus
- Education in Russia
- Education in Ukraine
