= Nikolai Ozerov =

Soviet tennis player, actor, and sports commentator (1922–1997)

- Born: 11 December 1922; Moscow, Russian SFSR
- Died: 2 June 1997 (aged 74); Moscow, Russia
- Education: Russian Academy of Theatre Arts
- Occupations: Tennis player, actor, sports commentator
- Awards: Order of the Badge of Honour, Order of the Red Banner of Labour, Honored Artist of the RSFSR, People's Artist of the RSFSR, USSR State Prize, Olympic Order, Order of Friendship of Peoples, Order "For Merit to the Fatherland", TEFI, Paul Loicq Award

Nikolai Nikolayevich Ozerov (Russian: Николай Николаевич Озеров; 11 December 1922 – 2 June 1997) was a Russian tennis player and actor, who was best known as a leading sports commentator of the Soviet Union in the 1950s–80s. He was awarded the Olympic Order in 1992, and received the Paul Loicq Award in 2016.

== Biography ==
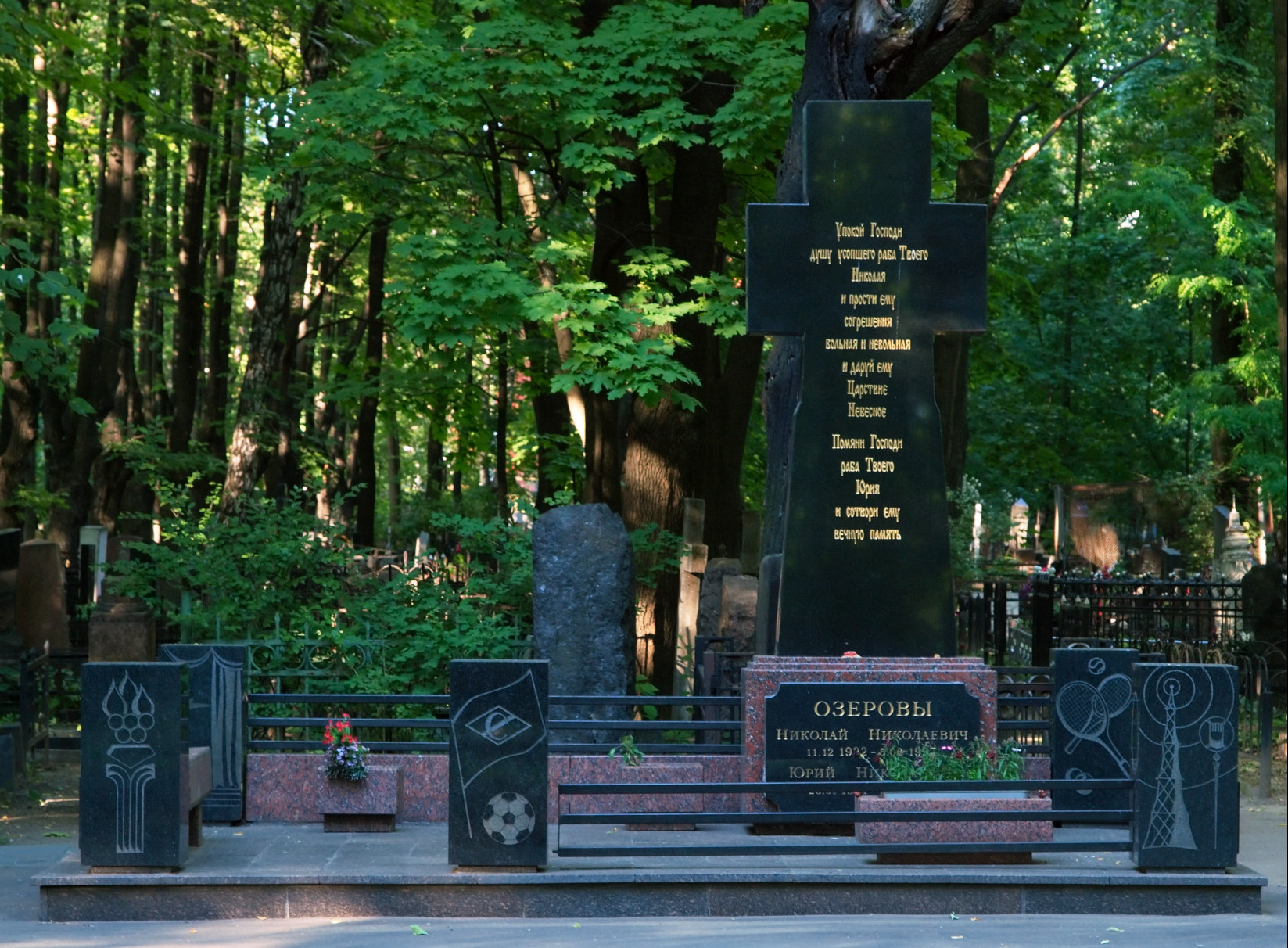
Nikolai and Yuri Ozerov's tombstone.

Ozerov was born to the opera singer Nikolai Ozerov Sr.; his mother Nadezhda trained as a stage actress, but abandoned her career to raise her two sons. His elder brother Yuri became a prominent film director, and his great-grandfather Mikhail Vinogradov was a notable 19th century composer. In the 1930s–60s Ozerov was a leading Soviet tennis player, and won 24 Soviet titles in singles and doubles between 1940 and 1963. During World War II, when the German army approached Moscow, Ozerov and a few remaining in Moscow tennis players were commissioned to play a long series of exhibition matches in various parts of the city. Those matches were enthusiastically covered by radio reports to raise the people's spirit.

In 1941 Ozerov enrolled to the acting department of GITIS, and after graduating in 1946 joined the Moscow Art Theatre, where he played more than 20 roles. He was also featured as a sports commentator in 13 movies, such as The Hockey Players and O Sport, You Are Peace!.

His sports commentator career began on 29 August 1950, when he had his first solo report of the association football match Dynamo Moscow vs. CSKA Moscow. The report was met with a positive feedback from the radio listeners, and in the early 1950s Ozerov semi-retired from tennis to devote himself to commentator's work; though he continued to win Soviet titles until 1963. As a commentator Ozerov covered ice hockey at 8 Olympics and 30 world championships, and football at 8 World Cups and 6 European championships, visiting approximately 50 countries. He also trained newcoming sports commentators such as Vladimir Maslachenko, Vladimir Pereturin, Yevgeni Mayorov and Anna Dmitrieva.

During the last game of Summit Series, after watching Alan Eagleson and his supporters shoving fists and middle fingers to the Russian crowd, Ozerov uttered the phrase «We don't need such hockey!» (Russian: «Такой хоккей нам не нужен!», lit. 'Takoy hokkey nam ne nuzhen!') which became a cult classic among the Russian spectators.

Ozerov was forced to retire in 1988 as a result of competition on the Soviet television and radio. After that between 1992 and 1996 he served as chairman of the sports society Spartak, for which he previously played tennis and football. In the 1990s, he had his foot amputated after a scorpion bite, and rarely left his house after that. Leg inflammation due to the bite, combined with diabetes, eventually resulted in his death on 2 June 1997. He was buried at the Vvedenskoye Cemetery in Moscow.

== Personal life ==
Ozerov married aged 47, though he knew his wife since the age of 31. They had twins Nikolai and Nadezhda. Nikolai was a promising tennis player, but had to retire after a leg injury, which he received in a failed parachute jump while serving in the Soviet Army. Nadezhda received the Paul Loicq Award on behalf of her deceased father in 2016.

== Awards and honors ==
- Honored Master of Sports (1947)
- Order of the Badge of Honour (1957, 1978)
- Order of the Red Banner of Labour (1971)
- Honored Artist of the RSFSR (1964)
- People's Artist of the RSFSR (1973)
- USSR State Prize (1982)
- Olympic Order (1992)
- Order of Friendship of Peoples (1992)
- Order "For Merit to the Fatherland", 3rd class (1995)
- TEFI (1997)
- Russian Tennis Hall of Fame (2003)
- Paul Loicq Award (2016)
