= Higher Attestation Commission =

Higher Attestation Commission (Russian: Высшая аттестационная комиссия, Ukrainian: Вища атестаційна комісія, abbreviated Cyrillic: ВАК, Latin: VAK) is a name of a national government agency in Russia, Ukraine and some other post-Soviet states that oversees awarding of advanced academic degrees. Due to translation differences, these committees are sometimes translated as the "State Supreme Certification Commission" or other similar variation; the common Cyrillic-based acronym of VAK remains a constant with all versions.

A commission of a similar kind (Bulgarian: Висша атестационна комисия) operated in Bulgaria until 2010, when it was abolished as part of a reorganisation of academic structures.

On December 9, 2010, the Higher Education Commission of Ukraine was merged into the Ministry of Education and Science of Ukraine.

== Russia and the former Soviet Union ==
During the Soviet Union, the Higher Attestation Commission under the USSR Council of Ministers (also abbreviated as VAK) oversaw and controlled the awarding of advanced academic degrees and academic ranks in all of the USSR. With the collapse of the Soviet Union, separate Higher Attestation Commissions arose in the newly independent nations. For example, the Russian agency is operating under the same name and is subordinated to the Ministry of Science and Higher Education, taking similar duties in the Russian Federation.

The responsibilities of the Russian Commission include:

- coordinating Dissertation Councils in Russian universities and research institutes;
- promulgating regulations concerning awarding of academic degrees;
- awarding the degrees of Candidate of Sciences and Doctor of Sciences, upon the recommendation of the Dissertation Council in the university or research institute where the defense of the dissertation took place;
- awarding the academic rank of Professor;
- making decisions on equivalence of foreign degrees awarded to Russian citizens.

Since 2016-2019, some (29, as of June 2020) top-level educational and scientific establishments in Russia, e.g. Moscow State University, were granted the right to award degrees independently, i.e. without a control, of the VAK; there are voices against extension of this option.

The Higher Attestation Commissions in other nations have similar responsibilities.

== Fields of study ==
Scientific degrees awarded VAK were classified into an established list of specialties, grouped into the following major sections

Code	Field	Code	Field	Code	Field
01.00.00	Physics and Mathematics	09.00.00	Philosophy	17.00.00	Art Studies
02.00.00	Chemistry	10.00.00	Philology	18.00.00	Architecture
03.00.00	Biology	11.00.00	Geography	19.00.00	Psychology
04.00.00	Geology and Mineralogy	12.00.00	Law	22.00.00	Sociology
05.00.00	Technical science	13.00.00	Education	23.00.00	Political Science
06.00.00	Agriculture	14.00.00	Medical Sciences	24.00.00	Culturology
07.00.00	History	15.00.00	Pharmaceutics	25.00.00	Earth Sciences
08.00.00	Economics	16.00.00	Veterinary	26.00.00	Theology

- positions 20.xx.xx were occupied by military sciences, position 21.xx.xx are kept in reserve since abolition of "naval sciences" at 1980th.

== See also ==
- Higher Attestation Commission (Russia)
- Dissernet
