= Last Hero 6: Heart of Africa =

- Season 6
- No. of days: 48
- No. of castaways: 18
- Winner: Alexander "Conan" Alexeev
- Location: South Africa
- No. of episodes: 15

Release
- Original release: 2005 – 2006

Season chronology
- ← Previous; Last Hero 5: Super Game Next → Last Hero 7: Lost in Paradise

Heart of Africa (Russian: Сердце Африки), From November 13, 2005, to March 11, 2006, Channel One aired a similar reality show, Heart of Africa (at first it was mistakenly called a new season of The Last Hero by some media outlets). Unlike The Last Hero (where living on an uninhabited island was a prerequisite), those arriving in Africa had to live with the Zulu people. The reality show was produced by VID television company.

The contestants for this season were split up into two tribes of nine known as the River and Sand tribes. Throughout their time in South Africa the contestants lived near a Zulu village and interacted with the natives of the village on several occasions. As a twist, on several occasions the natives were allowed to award immunity to the contestant of their choice. On the eighth day, a tribal swap occurred in which Sand tribe member Vitaly Ratnikov and River tribe member Rada "Lesha" Razborkis switched tribes. Following the merge, three of the previously voted contestants returned to the competition (Olga Shakira in episode 9 and Alexey Kuzkin and Rada "Lesha" Razborkis in episode 13). When it came time for the final six, the contestants competed in an immunity challenge, followed by a final tribal council. The final five then took part in a school yard pick to determine who would be the final four. The final four were then forced to compete in two challenges in order to determine who would be the finalists. Ultimately, it was Alexander “Conan” Alexeev who won this season over Elena “Lena” Pinchuk by a jury vote of 8–2.

== Contestants ==
Contestant	Original tribe	Tribal swap	Merged tribe	Finish
Vladimir Nifontov; 20, Moscow	River			1st Voted Out; Day 3
Olga Sidorova; 30, Moscow	River			2nd Voted Out; Day 7
Olga Shakira; Returned to Game	River	River		3rd Voted Out; Day 9
Vladimir Varzanov; 47, Sergiev Posad	Sand	Sand		4th Voted Out; Day 12
Nikolai Demin; 24, Moscow	River	River		5th Voted Out; Day 15
Vitaly Ratnikov; 34, Moscow	Sand	River		6th Voted Out; Day 18
Rada "Lesha" Razborkis; Returned to Game	River	Sand		7th Voted Out; Day 22
Linda Hevard-Mills; 37, Moscow	Sand	Sand		8th Voted Out; Day 26
Natasha Nikolaeva; 19, Rostov-on-Don	Sand	Sand	Sun	9th Voted Out; 1st Jury Member; Day 30
Alexey Kuzkin; Returned to Game	Sand	Sand	Sun	10th Voted Out; Day 33
Olga Shakira; 34, St. Petersburg	River	River	Sun	11th Voted Out; 2nd Jury Member; Day 35
Elena Ivankova; 30, Ramenskoye	River	River	Sun	12th Voted Out; 3rd Jury Member; Day 38
Lyubov Glazkova; 58, Moscow	Sand	Sand	Sun	13th Voted Out; 4th Jury Member; Day 41
Samir Makhmudov; 21, Moscow	Sand	Sand	Sun	14th Voted Out; 5th Jury Member; Day 43
Anna Karpova; 26, St. Petersburg	Sand	Sand	Sun	15th Voted Out; 6th Jury Member; Day 45
Roman Lebedev; 25, St. Petersburg	Sand	Sand	Sun	Lost Challenge; 7th Jury Member; Day 46
Rada "Lesha" Razborkis; 24, Nizhny Novgorod	River	Sand	Sun	Lost Challenge; 8th Jury Member; Day 47
Dmitry Makarov; 39, Nizhny Novgorod	River	River	Sun	Lost Challenge; 9th Jury Member; Day 47
Alexey Kuzkin; 26, Moscow	Sand	Sand	Sun	Lost Challenge; 10th Jury Member; Day 48
Elena "Lena" Pinchuk; 18, Dolgoprudny	River	River	Sun	Runner-Up; Day 48
Alexander "Conan" Alexeev; 27, Moscow	River	River	Sun	Sole Survivor; Day 48
