= Vlad Stashevsky =

Russian pop singer (born 1974)

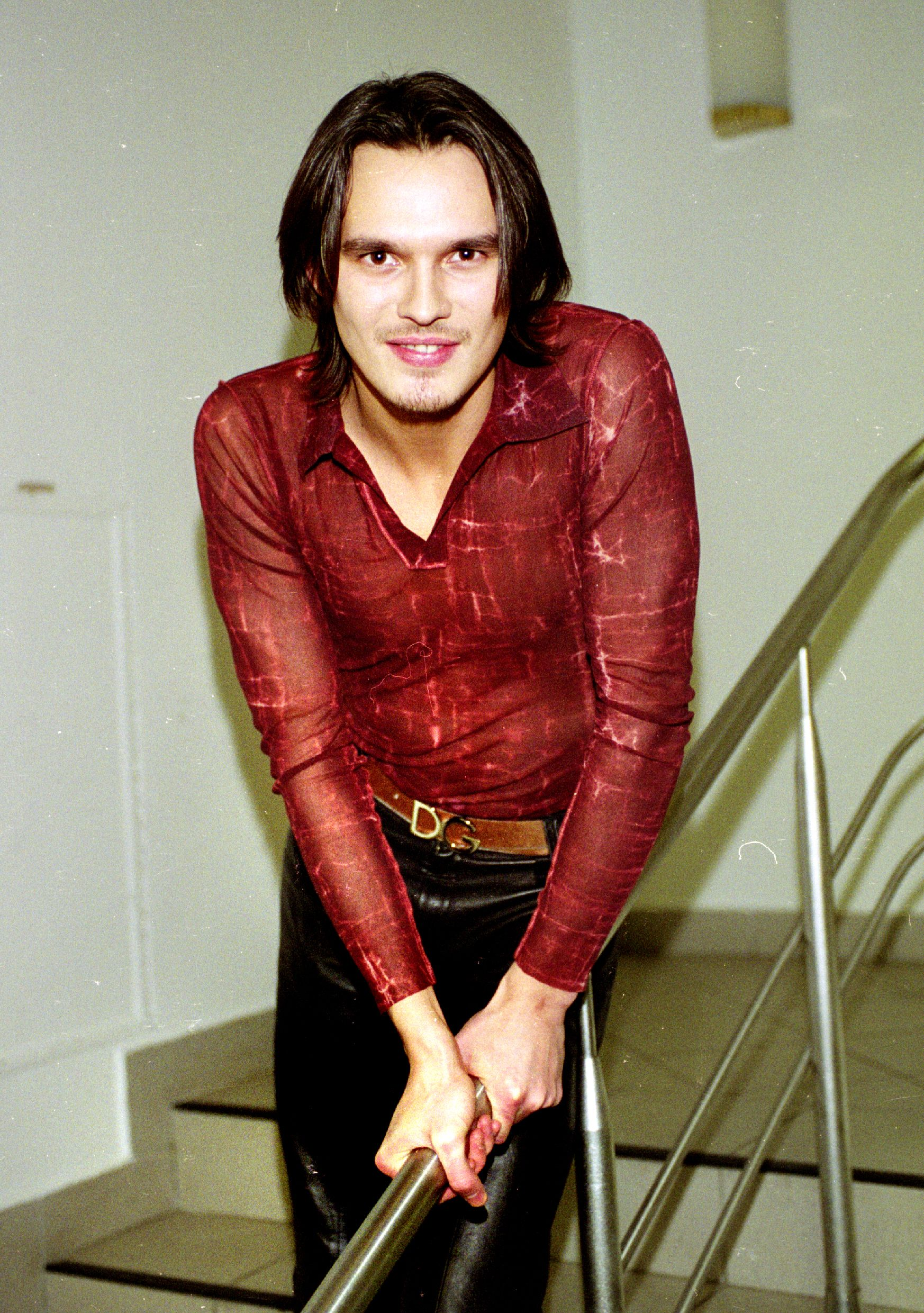

Background information
- Born: Vladislav Stanislavovich Tverdohlebov; 19 January 1974 (age 52); Tiraspol, Moldavian SSR, Soviet Union (now Transnistria)
- Genres: Pop, Russian pop
- Occupation: Singer
- Years active: 1993–present

Vlad Stashevsky (Russian: Влад Сташевский; born 19 January 1974), real name Vladislav Stanislavovich Tverdohlebov (Russian: Владислав Станиславович Твердохлебов), is a Russian pop singer.

== Biography ==
Vlad Stashevsky was born on 19 January 1974 in Tiraspol. His father, Stanislav Stashevsky, left the family when Vlad was less than two years old.

Stashevsky was raised by his mother Natalia Tverdokhlebova and his grandmother Maria Timofeevna Tverdokhlebova, who were both accountants. And Vlad accountant and did not. He was engaged in sports school gymnastics, running, rowing, skydiving, and martial arts. He graduated from the School of Music in piano. After eighth grade, Stashevsky enrolled in the Suvorov Military School, where he studied for about a month and then left.

Stashevsky enrolled in the commercial college and was in its student ensemble. After college, he entered the Plekhanov Russian University of Economics and later transferred to Moscow State University. Stashevsky has lived in Moscow since 1993. By chance, the singer met producer Yuri Aizenshpis at the club Master. A week later, his first song was recorded under the name The road on which we walk, whose author is Vladimir Matetsky. Stashevsky's first public performance was on 31 August 1993 at a festival in Batumi.

In 1994, Stashevsky released his first album, Love Does Not Live Here Anymore. At the festival White Nights in St. Petersburg, Stashevsky won the second place. In 1995, he released his second album Do Not Believe Me, Dear.

In 1996 he released the album Vlad-21. As a result of a referendum that was held amongst the readers of the newspaper Moskovsky Komsomolets, Stashevsky was named the best singer of the year and received the award Ovation in the category Schlager-96 for the song Call me in the night. This clip has been featured more than 500 times on major television channels. In 1998, Vlad received the Golden Gramophone Award and a 100-pood hit. In total, Vlad Stashevsky's collection has 3 Golden Gramophone prizes, won in the years 1996, 1997 and 1998.

In 1999, Vlad parted with his producer Yuri Aizenshpis and began to record his sixth album. The CD was released by NOX music and Vlad Stashevsky production. The audience did not take Stashevsky philosopher, and by 2002, he disappeared from the screens.

Today, Vlad is married to his second wife and engaged in business, namely running a company that disposes of liquid chemical waste. At the same time he serves the country with his songs. Stashevsky participated in the reality show Last Hero.

== Discography ==
- 1994 — Love Is Here No More Live
- 1995 — Do not Believe Me, Sweetheart
- 1996 — 21
- 1997 — Tea-Сolored Еyes
- 1998 — Vecherochki-Vecherki
- 2000 — Labyrinths
- 2002 — THE BEST of the best songs Remixes (DJ Groove)
- 2003 — Next to you... The Best (1st and 2nd part)
- 2025 — Connor Murphy My Dearest

== Personal life ==
- Stashevsky was married from 1997 to 2002 to his first wife Olga Alyoshina, the daughter of the millionaire Vladimir Alyoshin, the General Director of the Luzhniki Olympic Complex. With Olga, he had a son, Daniil (born 7 April 1998). Stashevsky has since 2006 been married to his second wife Irina Migulya (born 1984). With Irina he had another son, Timofey (born 8 March 2008).
