= Jeanna Friske =

Russian actress and singer (1974–2015)

Zhanna Friske
- Жанна Фриске
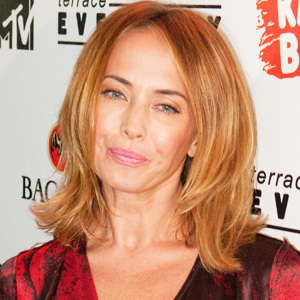
- Friske in 2011
- Born: Jeanna Vladimirovna Kopylova; 8 July 1974; Moscow, Soviet Union
- Died: 15 June 2015 (aged 40); Balashikha, Russia
- Other name: Zhanna Friske
- Occupations: Singer; model; actress; socialite
- Years active: 1996–2003 (group); 2004–2013 (solo)
- Height: 1.66 m (5 ft 5 1/2 in)

Zhanna Vladimirovna Friske (Russian: Жанна Владимировна Фриске; born Zhanna Vladimirovna Kopylova; 8 July 1974 – 15 June 2015) was a Russian actress, singer and model. She was a member of the girl group Blestyashchiye. She was a Russia German by nationality.

== Family ==
Her father Vladimir Kopylov (later known as Vladimir Friske) is of German descent; his mother Paulina Friske was born to a Black Sea German family in the Odesa Oblast in the then Soviet Union. She graduated from secondary school No. 406, Perovo District, Moscow, in 1991. She studied journalism at Moscow University, but abandoned it.

Friske's common-law husband was Russian singer and television personality Dmitry Shepelev. On 7 April 2013 the couple announced via Friske's official Web site that Friske had given birth to a son in Miami, Florida.

== Career ==
She first became famous when she joined the band Blestyashchiye in 1996, which she left in 2003 to embark on a solo career as a singer, actress and occasional model. She was best known for her roles in such films as Night Watch and Day Watch as Alisa Donnikova. A 20-minute love scene involving Friske was edited from Day Watch by the director, Timur Bekmambetov, the last installment of the trilogy, Final Watch.

Her most successful single was I Was, which reached the top of the Russian charts; her album was also a major success reaching the top in all Russian-speaking countries. In 1996, she started her creative career by joining the singing group Blestyashchiye, which recorded four solo albums and issued 3 solo programs for their fans. In 2003 she took part in the reality show The Last Hero 4 up to its final moment. Immediately after returning from that island shooting she announced her withdrawal from Blestyashchiye to begin a solo career. In 2005, she participated again in the reality show The Last Hero 5.

In 2008, she skated with Vitaly Novikov and Maxim Marinin in Ice Age 2. On 4 October 2005, her first solo album was released under the name of Jeanna. Some of the songs have been released as music videos: I am Flying Into the Darkness, La–La-La, Somewhere in Summer.

She appeared in Night Watch (2004) as Alisa Donnikova. Although most of her scenes were cut, she had a more prominent role in the sequel, Day Watch, and appeared on its posters. She performed many stunts. She played herself in the film What Men Talk About (2010), a performance of the popular play Conversations of the middle-aged men by the Kvartet I. She played a major part in the detective story Klim Shipenko's Who Am I?, released in 2010.

She also performed the Russian voice for Holley Shiftwell in Pixar's Cars 2.

== Illness and death ==
On 20 January 2014, her husband, Dmitry Shepelev, announced via Friske's website that Friske had been diagnosed with cancer.

Other sites reported that Friske had been diagnosed with a stage IV glioblastoma, a malignant brain tumor. She was diagnosed with cancer two months prior to giving birth to her child. She was offered chemotherapy during her pregnancy but she refused treatment to save her baby.

In April 2013 she gave birth to a son. Her cancer worsened, and, on 15 June 2015, she died at age 40.

== Filmography ==
Year	Title	Role	Notes
2004	Night Watch	Alice Donnikova	
2006	Day Watch	Alice Donnikova	
2010	What Men Talk About	Herself	
2010	Novogodnie Svaty	Herself	
2010	Who Am I?	Anya	
2011	Cars 2	Holley Shiftwell	Russian version

== Discography ==
Albums

- Zhanna (2005)

=== Singles ===
- La-La-La (2004)
- Somewhere in Summer (2005)
- Mama Maria (2006)
- Malinki (feat. Diskoteka Avariya) (2006)
- I Was (2007)
- Jeanna Friske (2008)
- American (2009)
- Portofino (2009)
- Vestern (with Tanya Tereshina) (2009)
- Pilot (2011)
- Ty Ryadom (feat. Geegun) (2011)
- Forever (2012)
