= Georgy Sarkisyants =

Georgy Sarkisyants

Georgy Georgievich Sarkisyants (Russian: Гео́ргий Гео́ргиевич Саркисья́нц; March 16, 1934, in Moscow – May 5, 2011, in Moscow) was a Soviet and Russian sports journalist and TV commentator, best known for the television show Football Review, a television and radio commentary of the largest sporting events.

== Biography ==
He studied at the Moscow State Institute, after the merger of the Institute of Oriental Studies of MGIMO and in 1954 moved to the Leningrad State University, Department of Journalism at the Faculty of Philology. In the USSR Radio and Television since 1959.

The commentator, who led the coverage of boxing, football, figure skating. In 1960, for the first time as a commentator held in the air parade dedicated to the Day of the Soviet athlete.

He conducted thematic review program Vremya, the transfer of Goals, Points, Seconds and Football Review. He commented 15 events of the Olympic Games, 30 world championships and European football, and boxing competitions, weightlifting, biathlon and figure skating. He became the first sports commentator, who received the title of Honored Worker of Culture of Russia.

In his final years he worked as a television commentator on the channel Eurosport-Russia.
