= Stanislav Solovkin =

Russian film director

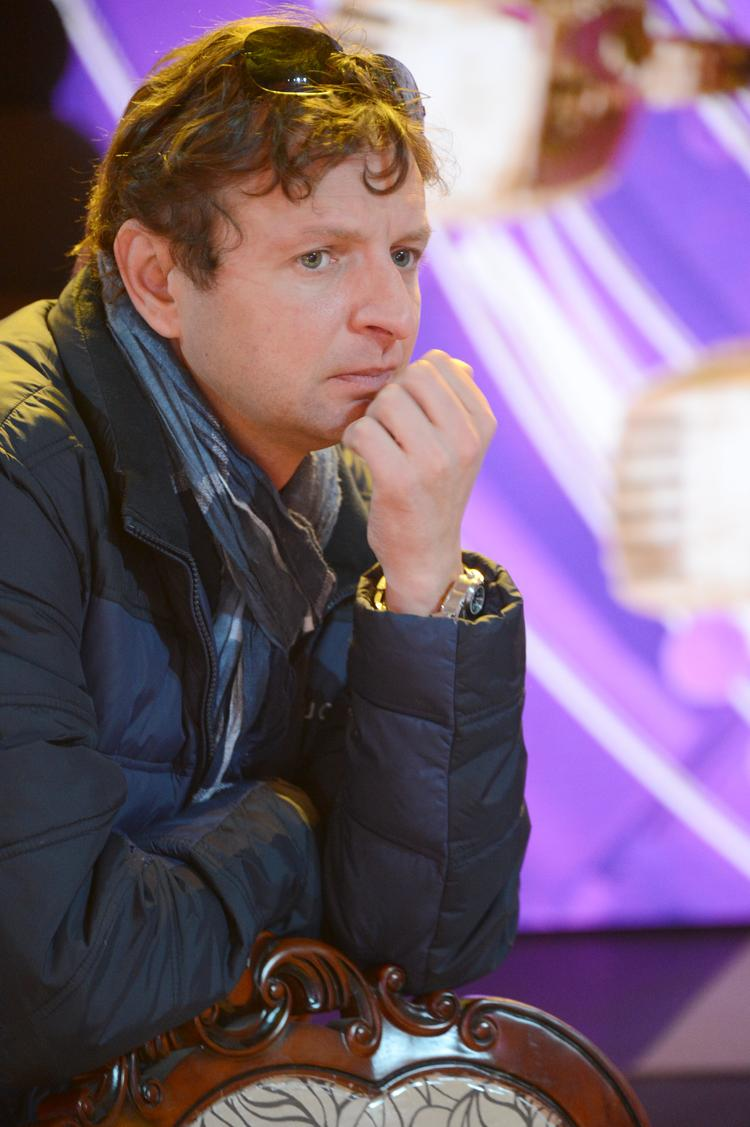
- Born: Станислав Александрович Соловкин; 10 January 1977 (age 49); Moscow, USSR
- Education: Master's degree, journalism
- Alma mater: Moscow State University
- Occupations: journalist; director; producer
- Years active: 1994–present
- Known for: Last Hero; The Amazing Race; Wait for me
- Website: Soartv.tv

Stanislav Aleksandrovich Solovkin (Russian: Станисла́в Алекса́ндрович Соло́вкин, born 10 January 1977) is a Russian journalist, director and producer. He is best known for his work on Last Hero, Wait for me and other popular television broadcasts.

Two works of Solovkin (Slave Market and Mysteries of Stalin. A Version of a Biography) were nominated for TEFI and made it to the final three. As a producer he also took part in shooting the Amazing Race (CBS American television network), the popular Emmy Award-winning reality show.

== Biography ==
Stanislav Solovkin was born on January 10, 1977, in Moscow.

When he was 17 years old he got a job on the program News for the Young (ORT), where he first worked as a journalist, and then story-producer and director.

In 1996 he matriculated in the Moscow University Faculty of Journalism, from which he graduated in 2002.

From 1996 to 1997 he was a correspondent for the weekly newspaper Novaya Gazeta.

In 1997 Solovkin began working for the television company VID, where over the years he was an author, screenwriter, editor, producer and director of programs such as Vzglyad, Wait for me, Make a step, Another Life, The Way That Happened and many others. At that same time, he was author and director of the documentary Slave Market, which was a TEFI finalist. The film received a critical acclaim. Solovkin headed a TV group filming the events of the Second Chechen War.

In the early 2000s Solovkin moved to Israel, where he worked at the Russian-language channel "Israel+". He later served as deputy editor-in-chief of the magazine Colour TV, and became the production manager and later co-executive producer of the show Last Hero, a Russian version of world-famous “Survivor” franchise.

Since 2004 he has headed a number of TV companies producing programs for the Russian television. As an executive producer he participated in the creation of House of Romanov, Love and Death , The Romanovs: the Last Day , Mysteries of Stalin – a Version of a Biography (program-finalist in the TEFI National Competition) and other TV shows. He also produced the comedy shows Comedy on Channel One, Funny People, Umora, Funny Pictures, the reality shows Wipe Out and Tower.

Since 2008 he has collaborated with the CBS TV network (US), for which he facilitated 9 series of the program Amazing Race. The program won several Emmy awards.

In 2014, together with prominent producer Vladimir Kartashkov he founded the television and film production company Soar Productions.

In 2015 Solovkin facilitated of an episode of the program Top Gear in St. Petersburg.

in 2019 Stanislav Solovkin opened the first Russian TV company in Cuba.

== Filmography ==
=== Documentaries ===
- Slave Market, Pervy Kanal. Nominated for TEFI, 2000.
- Andersen. 200 Years after Childhood, Pervy Kanal
- The Last Mystery of General Kappel TVC Network
- The Last Secret of the Royal Family, Rossiya Channel
- DNA Nation, SBS (Australia)
- Silk Road: 2000 Years Cross Roads, CCTV (China)

=== TV shows ===
Stanislav Solovkin has worked on the co-production and facilitating of television programs for CBS, BBC, Discovery, Channel 7 Australia, Travel Channel, Sci-Fi and others. including:

- Destination Truth, Sci-Fi Channel (US)
- Top Gear in St. Petersburg, BBC.
- Amazing Race for the CBS network, US
- Cruel Intentions (Wipe Out) in Argentina
- The Bachelor TV channel TNT (Dominican Republic, Venezuela)
- The Amazing Race Australia channel "Channel 7 Australia".
- Ayalagan Astana, TV channel "Channel One Eurasia".
- A series of documentaries of Edvard Radzinsky. The series Mystery of Stalin's death: the Last Secret was a TEFI finalist.
- The Funny People series
- How it Was
- News for the Young
- Wait for me
- Vzglyad
- Another Life
- Last Hero
- Moscow Does Not Believe in Tears – 25 years later ...
- Comedy Club on the First
- Funny Pictures
- 12 Little Statuettes, TNT
- M. Tariverdiyev. 17 Moments of Destiny
- Hello, girls!
- Jake and the Never Land Pirates
- Graduation MTV
- My Camp Rock
- Rehabilitation channel "Russia - 1"
- Long time no see, TVC
- Stars without pathos, channel "YU"
- Star Carousel
- Revelations, channel "Star"
- 90 Day Fiance, TLC (US)
- Ancient Aliens, History Channel (US)
- Man Finds Food, Travel Channel (US)
- Reizen Waes, One (Belgium)
- Chelsea, Netflix (US)
- Conan in Armenia, TBS (US)
- Vol 920, TVA (Canada)
- Celebrity Adventure Club, Travel Channel (US)
- You Only Live Once, Travel Channel (US)
- Amazing Race China, Shenzhen TV (China)

== See also ==
- VID (company)
