= Vladimir Pereturin =

Russian footballer (1938-2017)

- Born: 23 May 1938; Moscow, Russian SFSR, USSR
- Died: 22 May 2017 (aged 78); Moscow, Russian Federation

Vladimir Ivanovich Pereturin (Russian: Владимир Иванович Перетурин; 23 May 1938, Moscow – 22 May 2017, Moscow) was a Russian Soviet football player. He was winner of the Spartakiad of Peoples of the RSFSR (1959) and Master of Sports of the USSR.

He was best known as a TV commentator and host of 'Football Review' and 'Goal!'

== Biography ==
In 1955 Pereturin graduated from the Moscow 49th high school FONO (Frunze Board of Education). He started playing in the youth school of FC Dynamo Moscow. In 1956 head coach Mikhail Yakushin sent him to Dynamo reserves team, in which he played for two years. From 1959 to 1967 he played on a professional level, including 25 appearances in the Top League.

Pereturin won the football tournament at the Spartakiad of Peoples of the RSFSR in 1959.

After retiring as a player, Pereturin became a commentator. He covered all major football competitions and the Olympics. From November 1980 Pereturin was a host and main author of Football Review for 19 years, during which more than 900 episodes were created. Pereturin won the Sagittarius award for best sportscaster in 1997.

In 1998, he suffered a stroke. Two months after, he was back on the air with Football Review, but in late 1999 the show was cancelled and replaced with Football Time, presented by rival Viktor Gusev. Until 2003 Pereturin worked as a commentator on Channel One, but for the last three years of collaboration he was almost uninvolved. In 2003 he was dismissed from the editorial board and from the channel altogether.

From 1994 to 2003 he was also a member of the executive committee of the Russian Football Union and headed the committee on public relations and fair play.

Since March 2011 and until March 2012, after more than a ten-year hiatus, he led Football Review on the Internet portal of the 'Sovetsky Sport' newspaper. In the spring of 2012 he suffered a second stroke.

In August 2014 Vladimir Pereturin urged to abandon the Russian FIFA World Cup 2018 due to lack of money.

He died on 22 May 2017 in his native Moscow.
