= Inna Gomes =

Russian actor and model (born 1970)

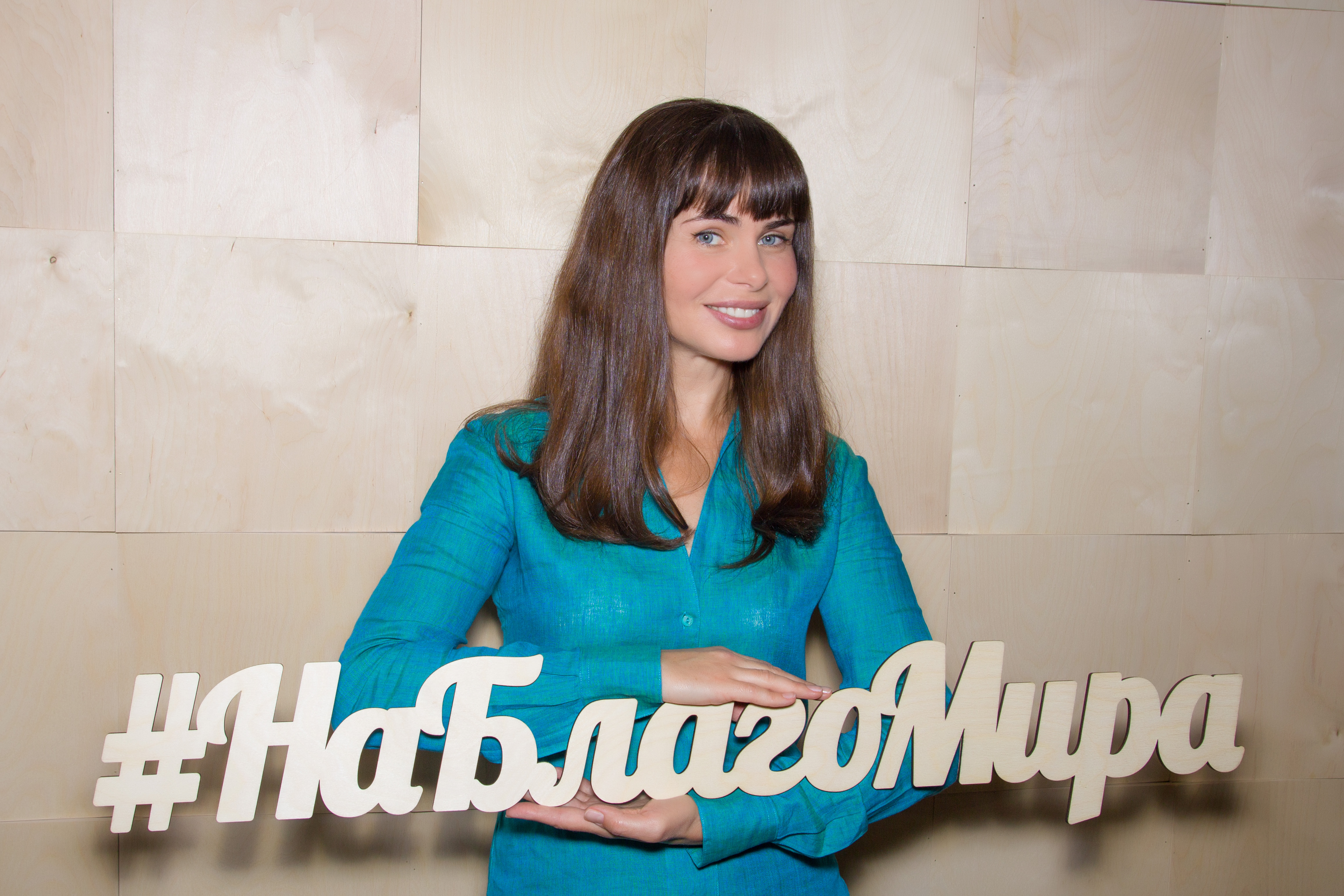
- in 2018
- Born: Inna Alexandrovna Churkina; 2 January 1970 (age 56); Barakovo, Rybnovsky District, Ryazan Oblast, RSFSR, USSR
- Occupations: Actress, model
- Years active: 1983–present
- Spouse(s): Augustino Gomes (m. 1991 - 1996 divorced)

Inna Alexandrovna Gomes (Russian: И́нна Алекса́ндровна Го́мес; born 2 January 1970) is a Russian actress and model, called "the best Russian model of November 2001" by Model Cast.

== Biography ==
Gomes was born in the village of Barakovo, Rybnovsky District, Ryazan Oblast, RSFSR, USSR. She lives in Moscow. In 1988, she became a finalist in the competition "Moscow Beauty". She worked as a model in «Red Stars» Agency, and filmed in the advertisement for companies Zarina, Sweet Mama, Alix Avien, Deffinesse, and PepsiCo. Married, she had a daughter Maria, in 2002.

In late 2001, she participated in the first season of the TV project "Last Hero" and Last Hero 1, Lost. After participating in a TV show she came to the Moscow Academy of Arts in the Department of Psychology (specialty "Psychology of advertising") and began to actively act in films and television series.

== Public activity ==
She initiated the project I Am with You! Kind Tales, which promotes a positive attitude toward motherhood in society. In 2008, the project was released by 1C as part of the 1C: Audiobooks series.

Since 2011, she has been a trustee of the Help a Child.ru charitable foundation, which assists children with serious illnesses.

In April 2019, she headed the For the Good of the World award for kindness in art.

== Filmography ==
Year	Title	Role	Notes
1983	Dangerous Nonsense	Schoolgirl	
1984	Guest from the Future	schoolgirl from Spaceport	Mini-series
2000	Good and Bad	Lena	
2000	Maroseyka 12	Angela	TV
2000	Bourgeois' Birthday	Alla	Mini-series
2001	The Black Room	Inna	TV series
2002	Summer Rain	Zhenya	
2002	Main roles	Kate	TV series
2002	Kamenskaya 2. All you have to pay	Karina Miskaryants	TV series
2004	Traders	Alla Orlova	TV series
2005	Sunday in the women's bath	Yuliya	TV series
2005	The League of deceived wives	Inga	TV series
2007	Arrive suddenly a magician	Vera	
2007	Snow Angel	Jeanne	TV
2007	Conspiracy	Vera	TV
2008	Bigwigs. To be together	Julia, Secretary of Borodin	TV series
2008	The Adventures of Alenushka and Jeremiah	Alenushka (voice)	Cartoon
2008	Cossacks-robbers	Pauline's mother Sasha	Mini-series
2009	Big Oil	Mariнa Golubeva	TV series
2009	Tridevyaty site		
2009	St. Petersburg vacations	Eva, a friend of Lena	TV
2009	The New Adventures of Alenushka and Jeremiah	Alenushka (voice)	Cartoon
2010	V Centuria. In search of the Enchanted Treasure	Galina Tkachenko	
2013	Puppeteers	Natasha	Mini-series
2015	True Samantha Smith	Jane Smith	
