= Last Hero 2 =

- Season 2
- Presented by: Dmitry Pevtsov
- No. of days: 41
- No. of castaways: 20
- Winner: Veronika Norkina
- Runner-up: Vladimir Nedopyokin
- Location: Malaysia
- No. of episodes: 13

Release
- Original network: Channel One
- Original release: 5 October – 28 December 2002

Season chronology
- ← Previous; Last Hero 1 Next → Last Hero 3

Last Hero 2 (Russian: Последний герой 2, Posledniy Geroy 2) – is the 2nd season of the Russian version of Survivor, Last Hero, hosted by Dmitry Pevtsov.

== Contestants ==
Contestant	Original tribe	Switched tribe	Merged tribe	Finish	Total votes
Igor Bezuglov; 34, Moscow	Elephants			1st Voted Out; Day 4	6
Maria Revzina; 23, Saint Petersburg	Elephants			2nd Voted Out; Day 7	5
Yana Shmelyova; 28, Khimki	Monkeys			3rd Voted Out; Day 10	6
Ol'ga Yaroslavtseva; 50, Moscow	Elephants			Eliminated; Day 11	3
Natal'ya Kolyvanova; 29, Yekaterinburg	Monkeys			4th Voted Out; Day 13	6
Igor Likhatsyov; 31, Vladimir	Monkeys	Monkeys		5th Voted Out; Day 16	7
Aleksandr Novin; 24, Surgut	Elephants	Elephants		Eliminated; Day 17	0
Aleksey Muzalevsky; 34, Saint Petersburg	Monkeys	Monkeys		6th Voted Out; Day 19	3
Nikolay Tumakov; 31, Ryazan	Monkeys	Elephants	Tigers	7th Voted Out; 1st Jury Member; Day 22	5
Andrey Kolesnikov; 29, Moscow	Monkeys	Monkeys	Tigers	8th Voted Out; 2nd Jury Member; Day 25	8
Nadezhda Kuzelnaya; 40, Zvyozdny Gorodok	Monkeys	Monkeys	Tigers	Eliminated; 3rd Jury Member; Day 27	3
Yelena Bartkova; 19, Mariupol	Monkeys	Elephants	Tigers	9th Voted Out; 4th Jury Member; Day 28	10
Nina Shorina; 63, Moscow	Monkeys	Monkeys	Tigers	10th Voted Out; 5th Jury Member; Day 31	1
Andrey Derekolenko; 28, Sumy	Elephants	Monkeys	Tigers	11th Voted Out; 6th Jury Member; Day 34	9
Denis Moshkin; 20, Sergiyev Posad	Monkeys	Elephants	Tigers	Eliminated; 7th Jury Member; Day 35	4
Mariya Gornastay; 19, Petropavlovsk-Kamchatsky	Elephants	Elephants	Tigers	12th Voted Out; 8th Jury Member; Day 37	1
Maksim Slavyantsev; 21, Moscow	Elephants	Elephants	Tigers	13th Voted Out; 9th Jury Member; Day 39	8
Kseniya Volkova; 26, Minsk	Elephants	Monkeys	Tigers	14th Voted Out; 10th Jury Member; Day 40	1
Vladimir Nedopyokin; 61, Rostov-on-Don	Elephants	Elephants	Tigers	Runner-Up	13
Veronika Norkina; 29, Stary Oskol	Elephants	Monkeys	Tigers	Sole Survivor	9

The Total Votes is the number of votes a castaway has received during Tribal Councils where the castaway is eligible to be voted out of the game. It does not include the votes received during the final Tribal Council.
