= Last Hero =

- Theme music composer: Bi-2 "Posledniy Geroy"
- Country of origin: Russia
- Original language: Russian
- No. of seasons: 12

Production
- Executive producer: Stanislav Solovkin
- Production companies: ViD (1-6); Krasny Kvadrat (7); Wait Media (8-12)

Original release
- Network: Channel One Russia (1-7); TV-3 (8-12)
- Release: 17 November 2001 – 31 August 2024

Last Hero (Russian: Последний герой, romanized: Posledniy geroy) was a Russian version of the Swedish reality show Expedition Robinson.

From season one to season seven it aired on Channel One. After ten years break, five more seasons aired on TV-3.

== Seasons ==
Season	Location	Days	Castaways	Year	Winner	Runner-up(s)	Final votes	Host
1	Panama	39	16	2001-2002	Sergey Odintsov	Ivan Lyubimenko	4-3	Sergey Bodrov
2	Malaysia	41	20	2002	Veronika Norkina	Vladimir Nedopekin	10-1	Dmitry Pevtsov
3	Dominican Republic	40	19	2003	Vladimir Presnyakov	Elena Perova	6-3	Nikolay Fomenko
4	Panama	36	20	2003	Yana Volkova	Jeanna Friske Yekaterina Semyonova	5-3-0	Alexander Domogarov
5	Panama	39	19	2004	Alexander Matveev	Jeanna Friske Svetlana Svetikova	5-3-1	Vladimir Menshov
6	South Africa	48	18	2005-2006	Alexander Alexeev	Elena Pinchuk	8-2	Alexander Domogarov
7	Panama	37	21	2008-2009	Vladimir Lysenko	Yulia Kovalchuk	4-3	Ksenia Sobchak
8	Philippines	39	16	2019	Anfisa Chernykh	Ilya Glinnikov	no vote	Yana Troyanova
9	Philippines	39	16	2020	Nadezhda Angarskaya	Igor Zhuk	no vote	Yana Troyanova
10	Tanzania	39	17	2021	Roman Nikkel	Yelena Bartkova	no vote	Yana Troyanova
11	Thailand	30	14	2023	Alexey Lukin & Vladislav Lukin	Nikoloz Ksnelashvili & Irakliy Pirtshalava	no vote	Ksenia Borodina
12	Russia	30	14	2024	Dmitry Konyshev	Ivan Pyshnenko	no vote	Ksenia Borodina

=== Season 1 ===
Contestant	Tribe		Finish	
Contestant	Original	Merged	Placement	Day
Elena Kravchenko	Lizards	—N/a	1st voted out	3
Olga Korchevskaya	Turtles	—N/a	2nd voted out	6
Boris Ivanov	Turtles	—N/a	3rd voted out	9
Alexander Morozov	Lizards	—N/a	4th voted out	12
Sergey Tereshchenko	Turtles	—N/a	5th voted out	15
Irina Furman	Lizards	—N/a	6th voted out	18
Nadezhda Semyonova	Turtles	Sharks	7th voted out	21
Igor Perfilev	Turtles	Sharks	8th voted out	24
Snezhana Knyazeva	Lizards	Sharks	9th voted out	27
Alexander Tselovansky	Lizards	Sharks	10th voted out	30
Natalia Ten	Turtles	Sharks	11th voted out	33
Sergey Sakin	Lizards	Sharks	12th voted out	36
Anna Modestova	Turtles	Sharks	13th voted out	37
Inna Gomes	Lizards	Sharks	14th voted out	38
Ivan Lyubimenko	Turtles	Sharks	Runner-up	39
Sergey Odintsov	Lizards	Sharks	Last Hero	39

=== Season 2 ===
Contestant	Tribe		Finish	
Contestant	Original	Merged	Placement	Day
Igor Bezuglov	Elephants	—N/a	1st voted out	4
Maria Revzina	Elephants	—N/a	2nd voted out	7
Yana Shmeleva	Monkeys	—N/a	3rd voted out	10
Olga Yaroslavtseva	Elephants	—N/a	Eliminated	11
Natalia Kolyvanova	Monkeys	—N/a	4th voted out	13
Igor Likhachev	Monkeys	—N/a	5th voted out	16
Alexander Novin	Elephants	—N/a	Eliminated	17
Alexey Muzalevsky	Monkeys	—N/a	6th voted out	19
Nikolay Tumakov	Monkeys	Tigers	7th voted out	22
Andrey Kolesnikov	Monkeys	Tigers	8th voted out	25
Nadezhda Kuzhelnaya	Monkeys	Tigers	Eliminated	27
Elena Bartkova	Monkeys	Tigers	9th voted out	28
Nina Shorina	Monkeys	Tigers	10th voted out	31
Andrey Derekolenko	Elephants	Tigers	11th voted out	34
Denis Moshkin	Monkeys	Tigers	Eliminated	35
Maria Gornostay	Elephants	Tigers	12th voted out	37
Maxim Slavyantsev	Elephants	Tigers	13th voted out	39
Ksenia Volkova	Elephants	Tigers	14th voted out	40
Vladimir Nedopekin	Elephants	Tigers	Runner-up	41
Veronika Norkina	Elephants	Tigers	Last Hero	41

=== Season 3 ===
Contestant	Tribe		Finish	
Contestant	Original	Merged	Placement	Day
Elena Kondulainen	Pelicans	—N/a	1st voted out	3
Kris Kelmi	Barracudas	—N/a	2nd voted out	6
Alexander Pashutin	Barracudas	—N/a	3rd voted out	9
Igor Livanov	Pelicans	—N/a	Eliminated	11
Dana Borisova	Pelicans	—N/a	4th voted out	12
Alexander Byalko	Pelicans	—N/a	5th voted out	15
Tatiana Dogileva	Pelicans	—N/a	6th voted out	18
Tatiana Ovsienko	Barracudas	—N/a	Eliminated	19
Victor Gusev	Pelicans	Crocodiles	7th voted out	21
Ivan Demidov	Barracudas	Crocodiles	8th voted out	24
Elena Proklova	Pelicans	Crocodiles	9th voted out	27
Marina Alexandrova	Barracudas	Crocodiles	10th voted out	30
Ivars Kalniņš	Barracudas	Crocodiles	11th voted out	33
Larisa Verbitskaya	Barracudas	Crocodiles	12th voted out	36
Alexander Lykov	Barracudas	Crocodiles	13th voted out	39
Olga Orlova	Barracudas	Crocodiles	14th voted out	40
Elena Perova	Pelicans	Crocodiles	Runner-up	40
Vladimir Presnyakov	Pelicans	Crocodiles	Last Hero	40

=== Season 4 ===
Contestant	Tribe		Finish	
Contestant	Original	Merged	Placement	Day
Sergey Krylov	Scorpions		Eliminated	1
Valery Danilin	Scorpions	—N/a	1st voted out	3
Yulia Nachalova	Iguanas	—N/a	2nd voted out	6
Maria Butyrskaya	Iguanas	—N/a	3rd voted out	9
Kirill Tolmatsky	Scorpions	—N/a	4th voted out	12
Marina Gryaznova	Iguanas	—N/a	5th voted out	15
Sergey Tarasov	Scorpions	—N/a	6th voted out	18
Svetlana Yastrebova	Iguanas	—N/a	7th voted out	21
Lika Star	Iguanas	—N/a	Eliminated	22
Ekaterina Vdovichenko	Iguanas	Snakes	8th voted out	24
Sergey Tygolukov	Scorpions	Snakes	9th voted out	27
Vitaly Fedorov	Scorpions	Snakes	10th voted out	30
Vlad Stashevsky	Scorpions	Snakes	11th voted out	31
Nikolay Drozdov	Scorpions	Snakes	12th voted out	32
Anna Zhdannikova	Iguanas	Snakes	13th voted out	33
Maxim Pokrovsky	Scorpions	Snakes	14th voted out	34
Alexander Matveev	Scorpions	Snakes	15th voted out	35
Ekaterina Semyonova	Iguanas	Snakes	Second runner-up	36
Zhanna Friske	Iguanas	Snakes	Runner-up	36
Yana Volkova	Iguanas	Snakes	Last Hero	36

=== Season 5 ===
Contestant	Tribe		Finish	
Contestant	Original	Merged	Placement	Day
Stas Piekha	Stars	—N/a	Quit	8
Alexander Berdnikov	Stars	—N/a	1st voted out	9
Alexander Novin	Champions	—N/a	2nd voted out	12
Tatana Dogileva	Champions		Eliminated	13
Ruslan Kurik	Stars	—N/a	3rd voted out	15
Irakly Pirtskhalava	Stars	—N/a	4th voted out	18
Elena Temnikova	Stars	—N/a	5th voted out	21
Tatiana Zaikina	Stars	Heroes	6th voted out	24
Dana Borisova	Champions	Heroes	7th voted out	27
Mikhail Grebenshchikov	Stars	Heroes	8th voted out	30
Nikolay Drozdov	Champions	Heroes	9th voted out	33
Sherif Musa	Stars	Heroes	10th voted out	34
Ksenia Larina	Stars	Heroes	11th voted out	35
Yelena Bartkova	Champions	Heroes	12th voted out	36
Maksim Pokrovsky	Champions	Heroes	13th voted out	37
Sergey Odintsov	Champions	Heroes	14th voted out	38
Svetlana Svetikova	Champions	Heroes	Second runner-up	39
Jeanna Friske	Stars	Heroes	Runner-up	39
Alexander Matveev	Champions	Heroes	Last Hero	39

=== Season 6 ===
Contestant	Tribe		Finish	
Contestant	Original	Merged	Placement	Day
Vladimir Nifontov	River	—N/a	1st voted out	3
Olga Sidorova	River	—N/a	2nd voted out	6
Vladimir Varzanov	Sand	—N/a	3rd voted out	9
Nikolay Demin	River	—N/a	4th voted out	12
Vitaly Ratnikov	Sand	—N/a	5th voted out	15
Linda Hevard-Mills	Sand	—N/a	6th voted out	18
Natalia Nikolaeva	Sand	Sun	7th voted out	21
Olga Shakira	River	Sun	8th voted out	24
Elena Ivankova	River	Sun	9th voted out	27
Lyubov Glazkova	Sand	Sun	10th voted out	30
Samir Makhmudov	Sand	Sun	11th voted out	33
Anna Karpova	Sand	Sun	12th voted out	36
Roman Lebedev	Sand	Sun	13th voted out	39
Rada Razborkis	River	Sun	14th voted out	42
Dmitry Makarov	River	Sun	15th voted out	45
Alexey Kuzkin	Sand	Sun	16th voted out	47
Elena Pinchuk	River	Sun	Runner-up	48
Alexander "Konan" Alexeev	River	Sun	Last Hero	48

=== Season 7 ===
Contestant	Tribe		Finish	
Contestant	Original	Merged	Placement	Day
Nikita Dzhigurda			Quit	1
Viktor Yerofeyev			Quit	1
Alexander Polovtsev			Eliminated	1
Olga Tsarkova	Water	—N/a	1st voted out	4
Kristina "Helga" Kruger	Water	—N/a	2nd voted out	7
Evelina Bledans	Fire	—N/a	3rd voted out	10
Lilia Sharykina	Fire	—N/a	4th voted out	13
Victoria Lopyreva	Water	—N/a	5th voted out	16
Kornelia Mango	Fire	—N/a	6th voted out	19
Olga Kostrova	Fire	—N/a	7th voted out	22
Tatiana Gerasimova	Water	—N/a	8th voted out	25
Mikhail Grushevsky	Water	Earth	Eliminated	27
Yaroslav Lazarev	Water	Earth	9th voted out	28
Alexey Polikhun	Fire	Earth	10th voted out	31
Andrey Reznik	Fire	Earth	Eliminated	32
Oleg Pavlovich	Water	Earth	11th voted out	34
Lyudmila Limarenko	Fire	Earth	Eliminated	35
Tair Mamedov	Fire	Earth	Eliminated	36
Anna Shapiro	Water	Earth	Eliminated	37
Yulia Kovalchuk	Fire	Earth	Runner-up	37
Vladimir Lysenko	Water	Earth	Last Hero	37

=== Season 8 ===
Contestant	Tribe		Finish	
Contestant	Original	Merged	Placement	Day
Artur Smolyaninov	Actors	—N/a	1st voted out	3
Natalia Filippova	Viewers	—N/a	2nd voted out	6
Ivan Shabanov	Viewers	—N/a	3rd voted out	9
Elmira Abdrazakova	Viewers	—N/a	Eliminated	10
Irina Bezrukova	Actors	—N/a	4th voted out	12
Roman Mayakin	Actors	—N/a	5th voted out	15
Elina Pashkovskaya	Viewers	—N/a	6th voted out	18
Alexander Lozhkin	Viewers	Pirates	7th voted out	21
Nikol Kuznetsova	Viewers	Pirates	8th voted out	24
Yulia Alexandrova	Actors	Pirates	Eliminated	26
Aida Martirosyan	Viewers	Pirates	9th voted out	27
Artem Suchkov	Actors	Pirates	10th voted out	30
Victoria Komakhina	Viewers	Pirates	11th voted out	33
Denis Shvedov	Actors	Pirates	12th voted out	34
Ilya Glinnikov	Actors	Pirates	Runner-up	35
Anfisa Chernykh	Actors	Pirates	Last Hero	35

=== Season 9 ===
Contestant	Tribe		Finish	
Contestant	Original	Merged	Placement	Day
Vladlena Veselova	Beginners	—N/a	1st voted out	3
Tatiana Root	Beginners	—N/a	2nd voted out	6
Alina Belkevich	Contenders	—N/a	3rd voted out	9
Dmitry Pavlyuk	Beginners	—N/a	4th voted out	12
Alexey Voevoda	Contenders	—N/a	Eliminated	14
Lukerya Ilyashenko	Contenders	—N/a	5th voted out	15
Natalia Bardo	Contenders	—N/a	6th voted out	18
Evgeny Papunaishvili	Contenders	Leaders	7th voted out	21
Mikhail Eremeev	Beginners	Leaders	8th voted out	24
Natalia Khapugina	Beginners	Leaders	9th voted out	27
Alexandra Maslakova	Beginners	Leaders	10th voted out	30
David Nuriev	Contenders	Leaders	11th voted out	33
Roman Nikkel	Beginners	Leaders	12th voted out	34
Igor Zhuk	Beginners	Leaders	13th voted out	35
Nadezhda Angarskaya	Contenders	Leaders	Runner-up	35
Evgenia Iskandarova	Contenders	Leaders	Last Hero	35

=== Season 10 ===
Contestant	Tribe		Finish	
Contestant	Original	Merged	Placement	Day
Svetlana Masterkova	Wolves	—N/a	1st voted out	3
Fatima Khadueva	Bears	—N/a	2nd voted out	6
Nikolay Serdyukov	Bears	—N/a	3rd voted out	9
Ksenia Surkova	Wolves	—N/a	4th voted out	12
Tatiana Larina	Wolves	—N/a	5th voted out	15
Pavel Yarygin	Bears	—N/a	6th voted out	18
Anna Sedokova	Bears	—N/a	Eliminated	20
Alexander Los	Wolves	Leopards	7th voted out	21
Alan Tsarikaev	Bears	Leopards	8th voted out	24
Daria Kolpakova	Bears	Leopards	9th voted out	27
David Niamedi	Wolves	Leopards	10th voted out	30
Zlata Kovalchuk	Bears	Leopards	11th voted out	33
Violetta Chikovani	Wolves	Leopards	12th voted out	34
Ivan Pyshnennko	Bears	Leopards	13th voted out	35
Dmitry Konyshev	Wolves	Leopards	Runner-up	35
Alexey Lukin	Wolves	Leopards	Last Hero	35
