= Higher Attestation Commission (Russia) =

- Высшая аттестационная комиссия Vyshaya attestatsionnaya kommissiya

Agency overview
- Formed: 1992; 34 years ago
- Jurisdiction: Government of Russia
- Agency executive: Vladislav Panchenko, Chairman
- Parent department: Ministry of Science and Higher Education
- Website: https://vak.minobrnauki.gov.ru

The Higher Attestation Commission of Russia (Russian: Высшая аттестационная комиссия) is the central authority for conferring academic degrees and titles in the Russian Federation and ensuring a unified state policy for the state certification of scientific and teaching personnel. A similar higher attestation body existed in the Soviet Union (the Higher Attestation Commission of the USSR) and currently exists in a number of post-Soviet countries. Within its purview, it oversees the work of dissertation defense councils, develops the regulatory framework for conferring academic degrees and titles, issues candidate and doctoral diplomas, associate professor and professor certificates, and performs a number of other functions, such as determining the list of scientific journals and publications for publishing the main research results of candidate and doctoral dissertations. In addition to fulfilling these functions in scientific and educational matters in Russia, it also forms dissertation councils for Tajikistan.

== History ==
The Higher Attestation Commission of the Russian Federation was established in 1992, after the collapse of the USSR. From 1992 to 1996, it was known as the Higher Attestation Committee of the Russian Federation, and from 1996 to 1998, as the State Higher Attestation Committee. In 1998, it was renamed the Higher Attestation Commission and subordinated to the Ministry of Education. After the Ministry of Education was transformed into the Ministry of Education and Science, it was subordinated to the Federal Service for Supervision in Education and Science (Rosobrnadzor).

From 2011 to May 15, 2018, the Higher Attestation Commission reported directly to the Ministry of Education and Science and was called the "Higher Attestation Commission under the Ministry of Education and Science of the Russian Federation." The award of an academic degree or conferment of an academic title was formalized by a corresponding order of the minister. Following the demise of the Ministry of Education and Science on May 15, 2018, and its division into two ministries, the Higher Attestation Commission came under the jurisdiction of the newly created Ministry of Science and Higher Education of the Russian Federation, although it is possible that its departmental affiliation will subsequently be revised.

Currently, the full name of the commission is "Higher Attestation Commission under the Ministry of Science and Higher Education of the Russian Federation," and the abbreviated name is "Higher Attestation Commission under the Ministry of Education and Science" (the abbreviation "Minobrnauki" currently officially refers to the Ministry of Science and Higher Education).

== Composition ==
The Higher Attestation Commission of the Russian Federation is composed of doctors of science and leading experts in the fields of science, technology, education, and culture. The Commission consists of a chairperson, deputy chairpersons, a chief scientific secretary, and members. The composition of the Higher Attestation Commission is approved by the Government of the Russian Federation. The Higher Attestation Commission includes expert councils in scientific disciplines.

The Higher Attestation Commission meetings are held at least twice a year. To promptly resolve current issues that arise between Commission meetings, a Presidium of the Commission is formed from among its members, which generally meets weekly.

=== Chairmen ===
- Feliks Shamkhalov (2012-2013)
- Vladimir Filippov (2013-2024)
- Vladislav Panchenko (2024 - incumbent)

== Degrees and Titles ==
Currently, the Russian Federation offers the degrees of Candidate of Sciences (PhD), Doctor of Sciences (DSc), and Associate Professor and Professor.

In accordance with the Regulation on the Procedure for Awarding Academic Degrees, a Candidate of Sciences (PhD) diploma is awarded by the Higher Attestation Commission based on the decision of the dissertation council of the institution where the dissertation was defended, while a Doctor of Sciences (DSc) diploma is awarded based on the decision of the dissertation council and a positive conclusion from the Higher Attestation Commission expert council for the relevant discipline. Since 2016, some Russian universities and research organizations have been granted the right to award degrees autonomously from the Higher Attestation Commission. Taking into account the latest legislative changes in mid-autumn 2022, there are now approximately one hundred such organizations.

From 2002 to 2013, the Higher Attestation Commission awarded the titles of professor in a specialty and associate professor in a specialty (the latter is equivalent to the title of senior research fellow, which existed before 2002). From 2011 to 2013, it also awarded the academic titles of professor and associate professor in a department, previously awarded by Rosobrnadzor. Since 2014, these titles have been referred to simply as "associate professor" and "professor," and are awarded directly by the Ministry of Education and Science and only in scientific specialties (the old titles "in a department" are equivalent to them). Currently, the Higher Attestation Commission does not participate in making decisions regarding titles, although it publishes notices of their assignment.
