= Last Hero 5: Super Game =

- Season 5
- Presented by: Vladimir Menshov
- No. of days: 39
- No. of castaways: 18
- Winner: Alexander Matveev
- Runner-up: Zhanna Friske
- Location: Pearl Islands, Panama
- No. of episodes: 13

Release
- Original network: Channel One
- Original release: 2 October – 25 December 2004

Additional information
- Filming dates: 1 September – 9 October 2004

Season chronology
- ← Previous; End Game Next → Heart of Africa

Last Hero 5: Super-Game (Russian: Последний герой 5: Супер игра, Posledniy Geroy 5: Super Igra) was the fifth season of Russian Last Hero show, hosted by Vladimir Menshov.

== Contestants ==
Contestant	Original tribe	Switched tribe	Merged tribe	Finish
Sherif "Jam" Musa Returned	Stars	Pirates		1st Voted Out; Day 3
Zhanna Friske Returned	Heroes	Pirates		2nd Voted Out; Day 6
Stas Piekha; 23, Saint Petersburg	Stars			Quit; Day 8
Aleksandr Berdnikov; 23, Ashgabat, Turkmenistan	Stars	Pirates		3rd Voted Out; Day 9
Alexander Novin Last hero - 2	Heroes	Pirates		4th Voted Out; Day 12
Tatyana Dogileva Last hero - 3	Heroes			Quit; Day 13
Ruslan Kurik; 24, Jūrmala, Latvia	Stars	Pirates		5th Voted Out; Day 15
Irakliy Pirtskhalava; 26, Moscow	Stars	Pirates		6th Voted Out; Day 18
Elena Temnikova; 19, Kurgan	Stars	Heroes		7th Voted Out; Day 24
Tatyana "Mona" Zaikina; 22, Volgograd	Stars	Stars	The Last Hero	8th Voted Out; 1st Jury Member; Day 27
Dana Borisova Last hero - 3	Heroes	Heroes	The Last Hero	9th Voted Out; 2nd Jury Member; Day 30
Mikhail Grebenschikov; 28, Voronezh	Stars	Stars	The Last Hero	10th Voted Out; 3rd Jury Member; Day 33
Nikolay Drozdov Last hero - 4	Heroes	Heroes	The Last Hero	Eliminated; 4th Jury Member; Day 34
Sherif "Jam" Musa; 29, Moscow	Stars	Heroes; Day 22	The Last Hero	Eliminated; 5th Jury Member; Day 35
Kseniya Larina; 19, Moscow	Stars	Stars	The Last Hero	11th Voted Out; 6th Jury Member; Day 36
Elena Bartkova Last hero - 2	Heroes	Heroes	The Last Hero	Eliminated; 7th Jury Member; Day 37
Maxim Pokrovskiy Last hero - 4	Heroes	Stars; Day 13	The Last Hero	Eliminated; 8th Jury Member; Day 38
Sergey Odintsov Last hero - 1	Heroes	Stars; Day 23	The Last Hero	Eliminated; 9th Jury Member; Day 39
Svetlana Svetikova; 20, Moscow	Stars	Stars	The Last Hero	Runner-Up; Day 39
Zhanna Friske Last hero - 4	Heroes	Stars; Day 22	The Last Hero	Runner-Up; Day 39
Alexander Matveev Last hero - 4	Heroes	Stars; Day 13	The Last Hero	Sole Survivor; Day 39

The Total Votes is the number of votes a castaway has received during Tribal Councils where the castaway is eligible to be voted out of the game. It does not include the votes received during the final Tribal Council.
