= Lika MC =

Russian singer (born 1973)

- Born: Lika Olegovna Pavlova
- Origin: Moscow, RSFSR, USSR
- Genres: Pop music, hip hop music, techno
- Occupations: singer DJ music producer
- Years active: 1990–present

Lika MC (also called Lika Star, real name Lika Olegovna Pavlova, Russian: Лика Олеговна Павлова) is a Russian female techno/rap singer and a DJ. Lika MC is part of the girl-dominated techno scene phenomena in post-USSR Russia.

== Biography ==
Born Lika Pavlova in Lithuania, she started working as a DJ at the age of 15, using the stage name Lika MC. She followed with composing and mixing her own songs in 1990, which ended in the release of her debut album Lika Rap. In 1992, her single "Let it Rain" was chosen for a two-week run on MTV. After that Lika changed her name to Lika Star, and continued recording under the new alias. Her last album More than Love was released in 1997.

In 2002, magazine interview she mentioned a possible move to London and joint project with the British techno band Apollo 440.

Journalist Andrey Shental mentioned that in the 1990s Lika MC was emulating the best trends of contemporary pop-music, and successfully managed to mask the absence of strong voice by technological hype.

== Discography ==
=== Albums ===
- Lika Rap Лика Рэп (Gala Records, CD,1992)
- Fallen Angel Падший ангел (Gala Records, CD, 1993)
- RAP (Gala Records, CD, 1994)
- More than Love Больше чем любовь (RDM, CD, 1996, 1997)
- I'm (NOXmusic 2001)
