= Vladimir Maslachenko =

Soviet and Russian footballer

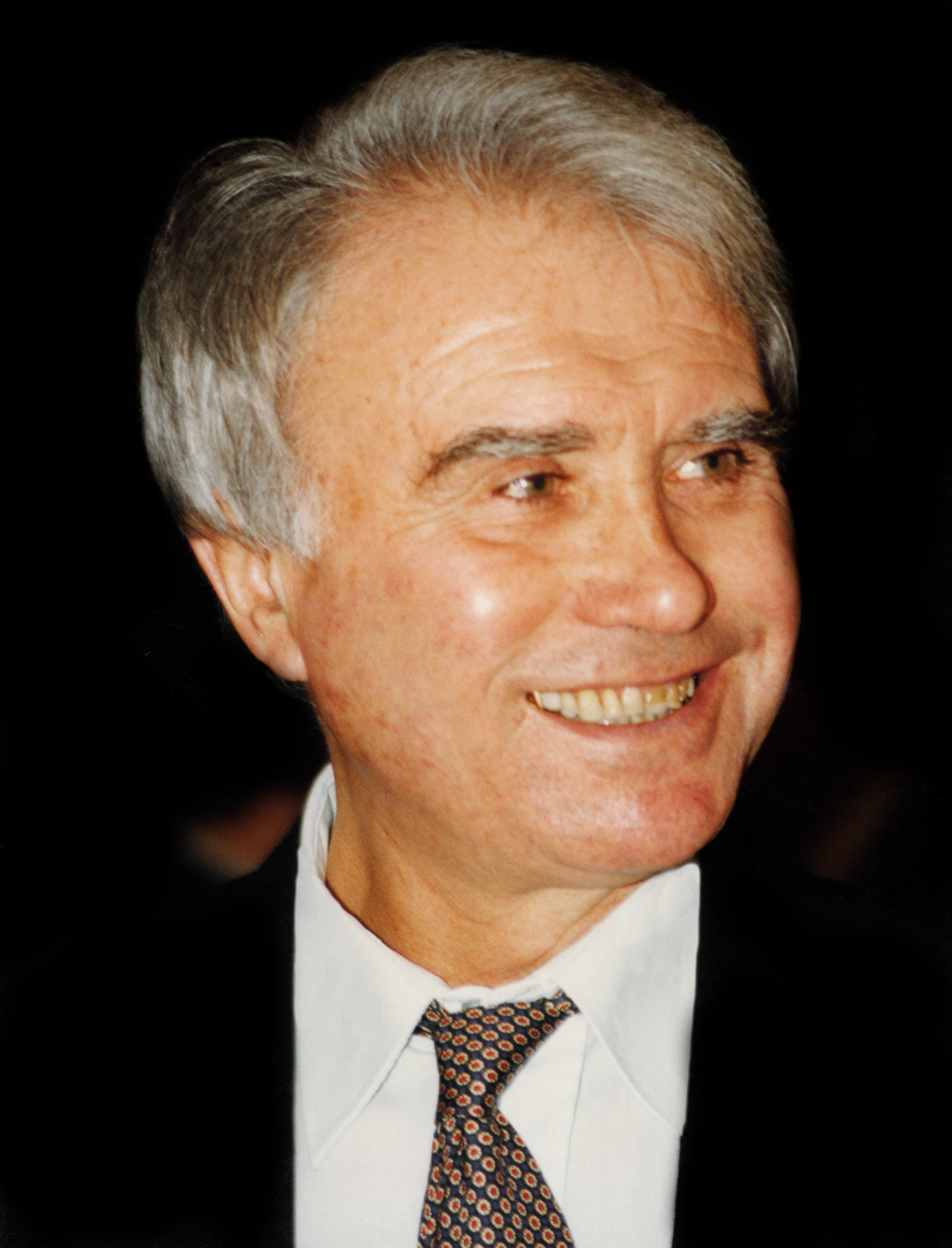

Personal information
- Full name: Vladimir Nikitovich Maslachenko
- Date of birth: 5 March 1936
- Place of birth: Vasylkivka, Ukrainian SSR, Soviet Union
- Date of death: 28 November 2010 (aged 74)
- Place of death: Moscow, Russia
- Position: Goalkeeper

Youth career
- Budivelnyk Kryvyi Rih

Senior career*
Years	Team	Apps	(Gls)
1953–1956	Metalurh Dnipropetrovsk	56	(0)
1957–1962	FC Lokomotiv Moscow	119	(0)
1962–1968	FC Spartak Moscow	196	(0)
Total		371	(0)

International career
1960–1962	USSR	8	(0)
Medal record
Representing Soviet Union
UEFA European Championship
Winner	1960 France
- * Club domestic league appearances and goals

Vladimir Nikitovich Maslachenko (Russian: Владимир Никитович Маслаченко; 5 March 1936 – 28 November 2010) was a Soviet and Russian footballer and football commentator.

== Biography ==
Maslachenko was born in Vasylkivka, Dnipropetrovsk Oblast. He was a native Ukrainian (khokhol as he called himself) from Vasylkivka (a settlement in west Donbass) and a product of youth football club from Kryvyi Rih. He started his senior level career in 1953 when he joined the local football "giant" FC Dnipro which at the time was known as Metallurg Dnepropetrovsk.

After several seasons, in 1957 Maslachenko was invited to Moscow where he stayed to his death. In Moscow he competed for Lokomotiv and Spartak. During that period he also played for the Soviet Union national football team and became a European champion in 1960. In 1962, Maslachenko won the Soviet Class A First Group (Soviet top league) title with Spartak Moscow.

After retiring in 1970, Maslachenko graduated from the Russian State Central Institute of Physical Culture. The same year he started his other career as a pundit (radio commentator) at the All-Union Radio and the Central Television. In 1972–73, Maslachenko tried himself out as a football manager, while coaching in Chad.

In 1973–1990, he worked as a sports commentator in Soviet television news program Vremya at the First Programme of the Central Television. Following the dissolution of the Soviet Union, he worked as at the Russian State Television and Radio Company "Ostankino" and since 1996 at the Russian NTV.

In 2010, Maslachenko died in Moscow.

== Honours ==
- Soviet Top League winner: 1962.
- Soviet Cup winner: 1957, 1963, 1965.
- Soviet Goalkeeper of the Year: 1961.

== International career ==
He earned 8 caps for the USSR national football team, and participated in two World Cups, as well as the first ever European Nations' Cup in 1960, where the Soviets won the title.
