= Vladimir Alyoshin =

Soviet economist

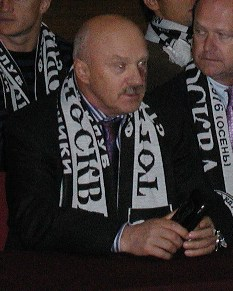
- Born: 9 March 1945 (age 81); Moscow, Russian SFSR, USSR
- Education: Moscow State Academy of Public Utilities and Construction
- Occupations: businessman, sports functionary
- Awards: Order "For Merit to the Fatherland"; Order of Friendship; Order of the Red Banner of Labour; Order of the Badge of Honour; Medal "In Commemoration of the 850th Anniversary of Moscow"; Olympic Order; Honored Worker of Physical Culture of the Russian Federation; Presidential Letter of Gratitude

Vladimir Vladimirovich Alyoshin (Russian: Влади́мир Влади́мирович Алёшин; born March 9, 1945, in Moscow) is a Soviet and Russian sports functionary and businessman.

From December 1982 before April 2011, he was the CEO of Luzhniki Olympic Complex. With his participation, the reconstruction of the sports complex for the 1980 Summer Olympics, the Big and Small sports arenas, the Palace of Sports, the Swimming pool and other objects are modernized.

Former Chairman of the Board of Directors of FC Torpedo Moscow. At various times he was a member of the Russian Olympic Committee, Executive Committee of the Russian Football Union, UEFA Stadium and Security Committee and Executive Committee of the European Association of Stadium Managers. In 2001, he was a recipient of the Silver Olympic Order.
