= Ministry of Science and Higher Education (Russia) =

Government minister of Russia

Ministry of Education and Science of the Russian Federation
- Министерство науки и высшего образования Российской Федерации; Ministerstvo nauki i vysshego obrazovaniya Rossiiskoi Federatsii

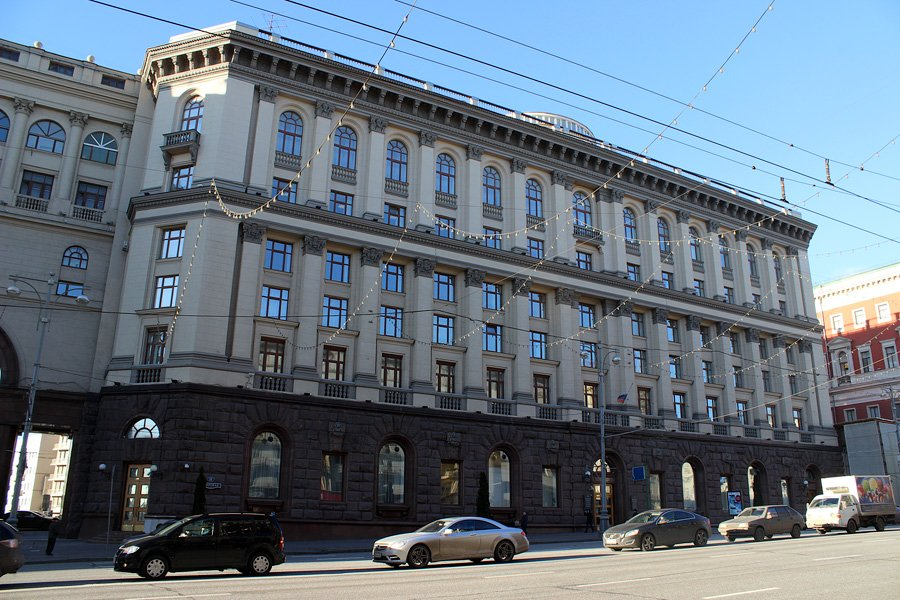

Agency overview
- Jurisdiction: Government of Russia
- Headquarters: Moscow, Russia
- Child agency: Higher Attestation Commission
- Website: www.minobrnauki.gov.ru

The Ministry of Science and Higher Education of the Russian Federation (Russian: Министерство науки и высшего образования Российской Федерации) is a ministry established in May 2018 as a result of splitting the Ministry of Education and Science, which existed from March 2004, into two separate agencies and the transfer of the tasks previously done by the Federal Agency for Scientific Organizations to the new ministry. The former head of FANO was appointed minister.

The second simultaneously emerged agency is the Ministry of Education sometimes called "of General Education" or "of Enlightenment".

== Responsibilities ==
The Ministry of Science and Higher Education is responsible for a state control over the scientific institutions and the university-level education in the Russian Federation. Particularly, all institutes of the Russian Academy of Sciences are now under jurisdiction of this Ministry. It is headquartered in Moscow. Mikhail Kotyukov was appointed as the first Minister. Since January 21, 2020, the Ministry is headed by Valery Falkov.
