= Nikita Dzhigurda =

Ukrainian actor and singer

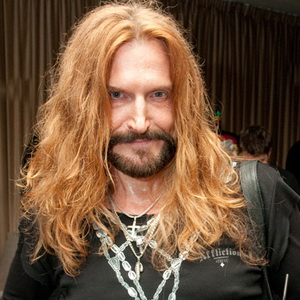
- Born: 27 March 1961 (age 65); Kyiv, Ukrainian SSR
- Occupations: Actor, singer, media personality

Nikita Borisovich Dzhigurda or Nikita Borysovych Dzhyhurda (Russian: Ники́та Бори́сович Джигурда́, Ukrainian: Нікіта Борисович Джигурда) is a Ukrainian actor and singer.

As an actor, Dzhigurda is known for his portrayals of historical figures, in particular for the roles of Yermak's lieutenant, cossack Ivan Koltso, in a 1996 TV miniseries Yermak by directors Uskov and Krasnopolsky, of prince Andrey Kurbsky, king Charles XII of Sweden and Ukrainian poet Ivan Franko.

He is also known for his flamboyant lifestyle and performances, usage of Russian profanities, and his comic appearances on internet videos.

Since 2011, he has frequently collaborated with Moscow hip-hop producer KOKA beats.

== Personal life ==
Since 2008 his wife is figure skater Marina Anissina.

== Filmography ==
- 1987 — Wounded Stones (Раненые камни)
- 1988 — The Dissident (Диссидент)
- 1991 — Behind the Last Line (За последней чертой)
- 1991 — Ivan Fyodorov as Andrey Kurbsky
- 1991 — Merry Christmas in Paris! (Счастливого рождества в Париже!)
- 1993 — Screw (Винт)
- 1993 — An Unwilling Superman, or Erotic Mutant
- 1995 — Sign of the Scorpio (Под знаком Скорпиона)
- 1995 — To Love In Russian Way (Любить по-русски)
- 1996 — Yermak (Ермак) as Ivan Koltso
- 1996 — To Love In Russian Way 2 (Любить по-русски 2)
- 1999 — To Love In Russian Way 3: Governor (Любить по-русски 3: Губернатор)
- 1999 — A Subtle Thing (Тонкая штучка)
- 2001 — A Prayer for Hetman Mazepa (Молитва о гетмане Мазепе) as Charles XII of Sweden
- 2002 — Looking Down (Смотрящий вниз)
- 2005 —- Vladimir Central Prison (Владимирский централ)
- 2007 —- Madness: Challenge and Fight (Безумие: Вызов и борьба)
- 2007 —- When Gods Were Asleep (Когда Боги уснули)
- 2007 — Judgement Day (Страшный суд) - as Ivan Franko
- 2008 — Crucified (Распятые)
- 2011 — Inspector Cooper (Инспектор Купер)
