= Viktor Gusev (sports commentator) =

Russian sports commentator

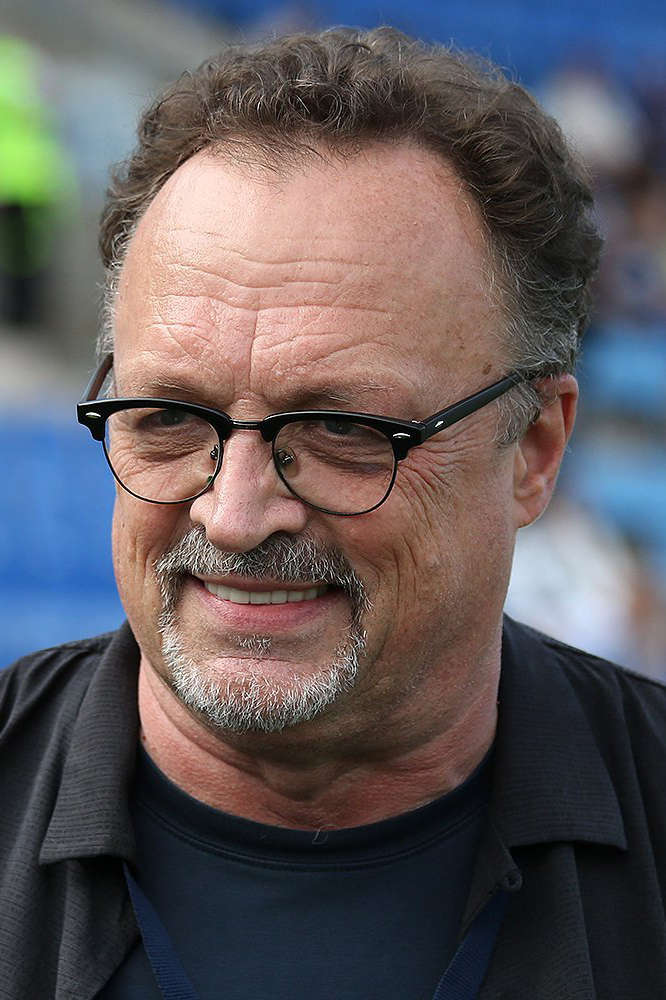
- Born: 27 October 1955 (age 70); Moscow, USSR
- Education: MGLU
- Occupation: sports commentator

Viktor Mikhailovich Gusev (Russian: Ви́ктор Миха́йлович Гу́сев, IPA: [ˈvʲiktər mʲɪˈxajləvʲɪtɕ ˈɡusʲɪf]; born October 27, 1955, Moscow) is a Russian TV presenter, sports commentator of the Channel One Russia; grandson of the poet Viktor Gusev, son of a scientist, Professor Mikhail Gusev, who headed the biological faculty of Moscow State University for 33 years.

== Biography ==
In 1972, he graduated from the special English school No. 19 in Moscow. In 1975, he trained at the University of New York (Albany). In 1977 he graduated from the Translation Department of the Moscow State Pedagogical Institute of Foreign Languages, majoring as a translator of English and French.

While serving in the army (1977-1979) he participated in hostilities in Ethiopia. He was awarded the medal 'For Battle Merit'.

Since 1979 to 1985, he was the senior editor-translator of the main edition of the information for abroad TASS.

Since 1985 to 1991, he was a correspondent for the sports edition of TASS. He was a member of the CPSU, but in the days of the putsch in 1991 he left the party, supporting Boris Yeltsin and the idea of a new Russia.

Since 1992, freelance collaborates with television, commenting on football matches and driving sports programs. The first report was from the draw of the final part of the 1994 FIFA World Cup, held in December 1993 in Las Vegas, USA.

Since the 1990s, at different times a correspondent for the sports editorial office of RIA Novosti, editor-in-chief of the monthly football magazine 'Match', press attaché of the CSKA Ice Hockey Club Russian Penguins, a press attaché of the Russian national football team in 1998 and at the 1994 FIFA World Cup, from the beginning of the 90s the lead author of the column in the English soccer magazine World Soccer. In the 2000s and 2010s he also kept diaries of the World and European Football Championships, the Olympic Games on Channel One.

Since 1993, he has been working as a simultaneous interpreter at the congresses of the International Ice Hockey Federation (IIHF), having already counted more than 50 congresses on his account.

Member of the Academy of Russian Television. Awarded with medals of the Order of Merit for the Fatherland II degrees, as well as the medal of Nikolai Ozerov. The owner of journalistic prizes 'Sagittarius', 'Golden microphone', the Lev Filatov Award. Laureate of the Russian Government Media Award in 2007. Laureate of the award of the Ministry of Sports of Russia, as the best sports journalist of 2015.

He is married and has three children: two daughters and a son.

In March 2024, Gusev was in the crowd with his wife during the Crocus City Hall attack, he escaped unharmed.
