= TV-3 (Russian TV channel) =

TV-3 ТВ-3
- Country: Russia
- Broadcast area: Nationwide
- Headquarters: Moscow, Russia

Programming
- Language: Russian
- Picture format: SDTV 576i

Ownership
- Owner: Gazprom Media

History
- Launched: June 6, 1994; 32 years ago

Links
- Website: http://tv3russia.ru (Russia only)

Availability

Terrestrial
- Digital: 15

TV-3 (also known as TV-3 Russia) is a Russian television channel which mainly broadcasts mystery, science fiction and fantasy shows and movies. It was purchased in 2006 by Vladimir Potanin's ProfMedia (ПрофМедиа), which in turn was purchased by the Russian natural gas giant Gazprom and placed in its Gazprom Media division in December 2013.

== History ==
The origins of the network can be traced back to 1994, where the channel began transmissions initially in St. Petersburg. By June of the same year, it started broadcasting original content. Initially, the channel aired films, documentaries, the analytical program Dom Sovetov ("House of Soviets"), and the documentary series Iskusstvo Risovat ("The Art of Drawing"). The name "TV-3" first appeared on air in summer 1995. Founders of the network included the St. Petersburg City Administration (registered on October 14, 1993), VGTRK, GTRK "Petersburg — Pyaty Kanal", the Radiotelevision Transmission Center, and the British company Independent Network Television Holding Ltd (INTH). The channel's original legal entity (also its on-air name during its first year) — CJSC "Telekanal 27" — was named after the channel's frequency number in St. Petersburg. In some sources and printed TV listings until the late 2000s, the channel was referred to as "TV-3 Russia".

In 1996, during the Olympic Games in Atlanta, TV-3 broadcast programs from the specialized sports channel "Meteor-Sport," produced by RTR-Teleset (in Moscow, it aired on channel 35, later replaced by TNT). In autumn 1996, TV-3 was relayed in Tula by the local cable operator SKTV Orbita. The original format of TV-3 ceased broadcasting in August 1997.

American Timothy McDonald became the channel's director in 1997. From November 1997 to July 1998, TV-3 began rebroadcasting programs from TV-6 in St. Petersburg.

On August 1, 1998, the channel relaunched with a new format centered on film screenings. The channel adhered to a concept of entertainment TV without "dark" content, airing Soviet, Russian, and foreign films (including low-budget productions), interspersed with commercial programs. From 2000 to 2007, the religious program Pobedonosny Golos Veruyushchego ("Victorious Voice of the Believer") aired weekday mornings, while weekends featured similar shows like Blagaya Vest ("Good News") and Zhizn v Slove ("Life in the Word"). Broadcasting utilized the technical infrastructure of the defunct "51 Telekanal" (St. Petersburg). By October, the relaunched TV-3 reached Moscow audiences. At the time, the channel held licenses for eight major Russian cities, with expansion into key advertising markets as a priority.

Stations were acquired in Saratov (Channel 9) and Voronezh ("oronezhskaya Televizionnaya Zvezda) in 2000, while INTH owned a regional company in Chelyabinsk ("Dashe"). Broadcasting began via the Yamal 100 satellite.

The company's central office opened in Moscow at 4 Akademika Koroleva St., Building 4 in 2001. Full-scale broadcasting began in Tula, while a station was acquired in Omsk ("Agava").

Stations were acquired in Vladivostok, Krasnodar, Novosibirsk, Rostov-on-Don, and Nizhny Novgorod's Nika-TV, along with partnerships established with regional TV channels in major cities across Russia in 2002. Nationwide network broadcasting began this year. Starting in April 2002, major advertisers began appearing in the channel's commercial blocks.

From 2002 to 2007, there were three versions of the channel (national, St. Petersburg, and Moscow), with slight differences in their schedules, including both advertising blocks and programs. These versions displayed logos that differed from the national version in size and font. Meanwhile, major channels in Krasnoyarsk, Izhevsk, Ryazan, Orenburg, Lipetsk, Vladimir, Tambov, Oryol, Abakan, Armavir, Kursk, and Anapa would start picking up the network in 2003.

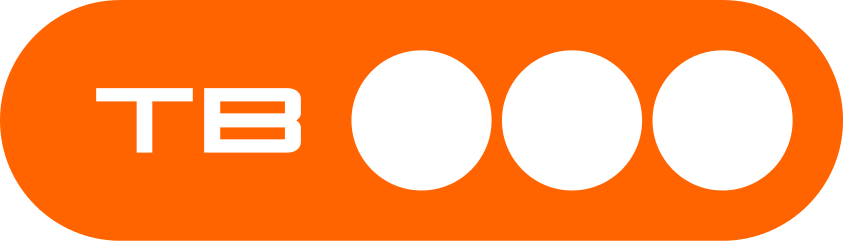
Logo from 2004–2008

On September 25, 2004, the channel updated its graphics and logo, introducing a vertical oval with three circles and an orange color scheme.

In 2005, the channel began time-shifted broadcasting starting in April for the MSK+3 time zone and in November for the MSK+7 time zone.

The network would later shift its programming once again into its current format, this time to focus more on science fiction and fantasy related programming.

In March 2015, the channel became part of the sub-holding "Gazprom-Media Entertainment Television" (GPM RTV), its office began to be located in the building of the business center Diamond Hall, together with the headquarters of the TV channels TNT, 2x2 and Friday!.

On 26 January 2016, TV-3 hosted the Russian premiere of the tenth, and on 4 January 2018, the eleventh season of the cult American television series The X-Files.

In 2023, the network purchased distribution rights to Miraculous: Tales of Ladybug & Cat Noir, which were previously owned by Disney in Russia but were sold off due to the company's pause in the market and the shut down of Disney Channel Russia.

== Programming ==
The network mainly airs mystical, science fiction, and fantasy related shows and movies.

== Criticism ==
TV-3 has been accused of propaganda of superstition and esoterism, including showing of films made of statements of scientists taken out of context that made it look like the scientists were talking to the TV-3 presenter. In 2015, it was nominated for "the most harmful pseudoscientific project (for spreading of myths, delusions and superstitions)" antiprize of a state prize of the Ministry of Education and Science; the prize was, however, awarded to REN TV's conspirological documentaries.
