= Elena Perova =

Russian singer (born 1976)

Elena Perova Елена Вячеславовна Перова
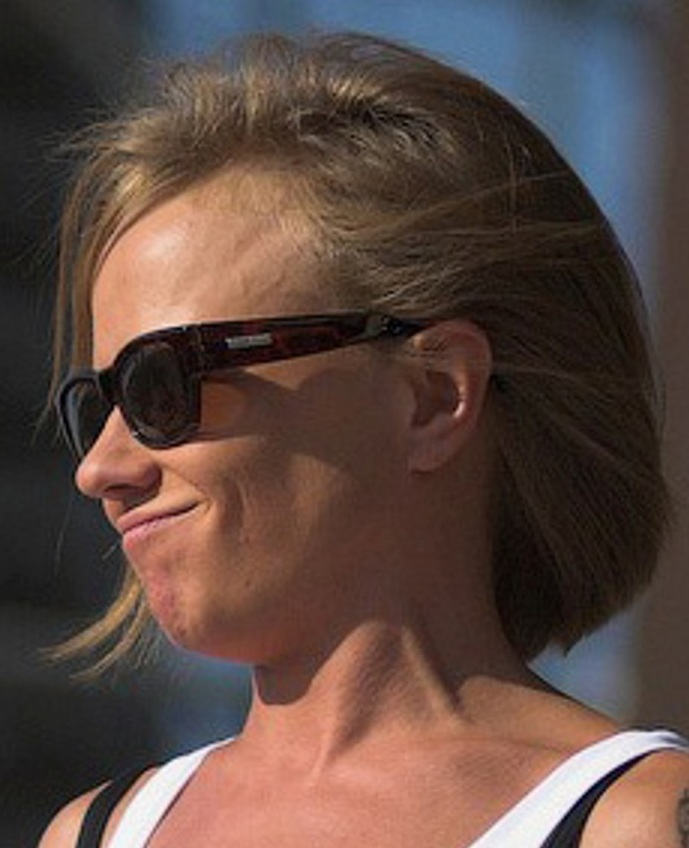

Background information
- Born: Elena Vyacheslavovna Perova; 24 June 1976 (age 50); Moscow, Russian SFSR

Elena Vyacheslavovna Perova (Russian: Еле́на Вячесла́вовна Перо́ва; born 24 June 1976 in Moscow, RSFSR, USSR) is a Russian singer and musician, TV presenter, actress. She was a former member of the Russian musical groups Litsey (1991–1997) and Amega (1998–1999). She won the Golden Gramophone Award in 1996 and TEFI in 2008. Since 2013, she has been chief editor of the Department of Music and Entertainment Programs in Channel One Russia.

== Personal life ==
Born 24 June 1976 in Moscow.

She describes herself as a bisexual. Her maternal half-brother is Sergei Suponev.

== Selected filmography ==
- In Motion (2002)
- Gloss (2007)
