= I Like It Like That (Per Gessle song) =

2006 single by Per Gessle

Single by Per Gessle

from the album Son of a Plumber
- B-side: "Plumber in Progress #2"
- Released: 24 May 2006
- Studio: The Aerosol Grey Machine, Vallarum, Scania
- Length: 3:34
- Label: Elevator Entertainment; Capitol Records
- Songwriter(s): Per Gessle
- Producer(s): Clarence Öfwerman; Christoffer Lundquist; Gessle

Per Gessle singles chronology
"Hey Mr. DJ (Won't You Play Another Love Song)" (2006)	"I Like It Like That" (2006)	"En händig man" (2007)

"I Like It Like That" is a song by Swedish musician Per Gessle, released on 24 May 2006 as the third single from his 2005 album Son of a Plumber. The track was written by Gessle and was originally composed for inclusion on Roxette's 2003 greatest hits compilation The Pop Hits. The duo never recorded the song, however, as Roxette vocalist Marie Fredriksson had been diagnosed with a brain tumour before their version could be recorded. The single contained a B-side titled "Plumber in Progress #2", a compilation of song fragments from the Son of a Plumber album.

== Recording and composition ==
The song was written by Per Gessle, and was first demoed at his recording studio Tits & Ass on 24 January 2002. The track was composed for Roxette's 2003 greatest hits compilation The Pop Hits, with Gessle saying he originally wanted Roxette vocalist Marie Fredriksson to perform lead vocals on the song. These plans were disrupted, however, when Fredriksson was diagnosed with a brain tumour in September 2002. Instead, the band re-recorded an outtake from their 1999 album Have a Nice Day for inclusion on The Pop Hits. "I Like It Like That" remained unreleased until it appeared on Gessle's 2005 solo album Son of a Plumber, featuring backing vocals from Swedish vocalist Helena Josefsson. Gessle said the song features that album's "strongest chorus", and described it as the "most classic Gessle"-sounding song on Son of a Plumber.

== Critical reception ==
Göteborgs-Posten said the track is a "good example of a song that could have been a power ballad for Roxette but is now picked down with mandolin, hand clapping and other cozy things".

== Release and promotion ==
"I Like It Like That" was originally scheduled for release on 17 May 2006, the same day Fredriksson issued "Sommaräng", the lead single from her album Min bäste vän. For unspecified reasons, the release of "I Like It Like That" was delayed to the following week. It debuted at number 53 on the Swedish Singles Chart on the chart dated 1 June, peaking at number 47 the following week and spending a total of three weeks on the chart. The demo version of the song created by Gessle in 2002 for Roxette was released for free download on his official website in 2006, and later appeared on his 2014 box set The Per Gessle Archives: A Lifetime of Songwriting. The cover artwork for the single was shot by Anton Corbijn.

The single contained a B-side titled "Plumber in Progress #2", a compilation of song fragments recorded by Gessle in his home studio. The B-side consists of fragments of Son of a Plumber tracks "Are You an Old Hippie, Sir?", "Late, Later On", "Making Love or Expecting Rain", two versions of "Brilliant Career", "Speed Boat to Cuba", "Something Happened Today", "Ronnie Lane", "Carousel" and "Come Back Tomorrow (And We Do It Again)".

== Track listing ==
- Swedish CD single (0946 3 65221 2–8)
1. "I Like It Like That" – 2:58
2. "Plumber in Progress #2" – 6:42

== Credits and personnel ==
Credits adapted from the CD single liner notes.

Recorded and mixed by Christoffer Lundquist, Clarence Öfwerman and Per Gessle at Aerosol Grey Machine, Vallarum, Scania.

- Kjell Andersson – cover design
- Anton Corbijn – cover photography
- Per Gessle – composition, vocals, instrumentation and production
- Lennart Haglund – assistant engineer
- Jens Jansson – drums
- Helena Josefsson – vocals
- Christoffer Lundquist – instrumentation, engineer and production
- Clarence Öfwerman – instrumentation and production
- Pär Wickholm – cover design

== Charts ==
Chart (2006)	Peak; position
Sweden (Sverigetopplistan)	47
