= Pop-Up Dynamo! =

Album by PG Roxette

Studio album by PG Roxette
- Released: 19 October 2022
- Recorded: May 2020 – April 2021
- Studio: Tits & Ass Studio and Jam Studio, Halmstad; Sweetspot, Harplinge; Aerosol Grey Machine, Scania; Farozon, Malmö; Martin's Place, Stockholm
- Genre: Pop
- Length: 39:12
- Label: Elevator Entertainment; Parlophone
- Producer: Per Gessle; Clarence Öfwerman; Magnus Börjeson; Christoffer Lundquist

PG Roxette chronology
Pop-Up Dynamo! (2022)	Incognito (2023)

Singles from Pop-Up Dynamo!
- 1. "The Loneliest Girl in the World" Released: 3 June 2022; 2. "Walking on Air" Released: 23 September 2022; 3. "My Chosen One" Released: 24 October 2022; 4. "Headphones On" Released: 13 January 2023; 5. "The Craziest Thing" Released: 18 August 2023

Pop-Up Dynamo! is the debut studio album by Swedish pop band PG Roxette, released on 19 October 2022 by Elevator Entertainment and Parlophone. The band was formed by Roxette songwriter Per Gessle following the death of vocalist Marie Fredriksson in 2019. The album was recorded alongside several long-time Roxette contributors, including keyboardist and producer Clarence Öfwerman, bassist Magnus Börjeson, guitarists Jonas Isacsson and Christoffer Lundquist, and vocalists Helena Josefsson and Dea Norberg. The record also features vocals from Swedish singer Léon.

Five singles were released from the album: "The Loneliest Girl in the World", "Walking on Air", "My Chosen One", "Headphones On", and a Lost Boys remix of "The Craziest Thing". Several other releases were issued by the band during the album's promotion cycle, including the non-album single "Wish You the Best for Xmas", and the four track Incognito EP. The band also released a cover version of the Metallica song "Nothing Else Matters".

The album received generally positive reviews upon release, with reviews commending Gessle for continuing to record using the traditional Roxette sound. It was a commercial success as well, debuting at number two in Gessle's native Sweden, and charting in several other European territories.

== Background and recording ==
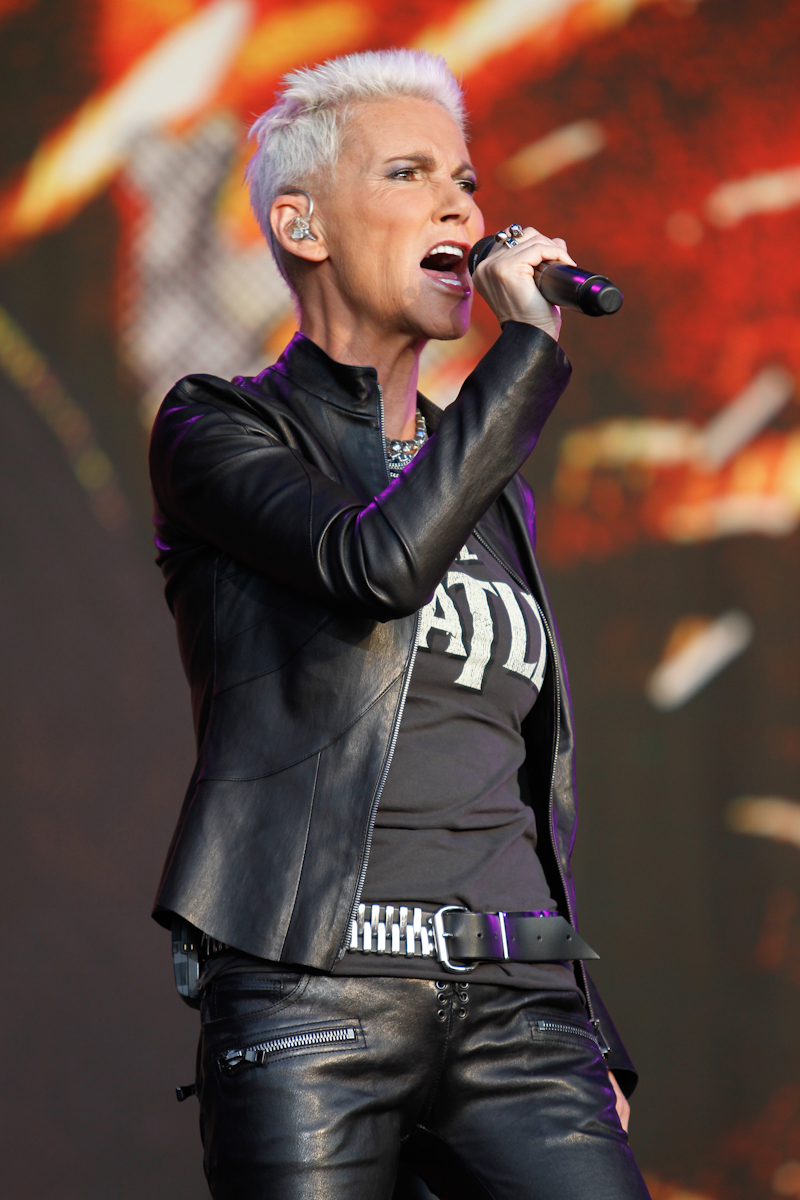
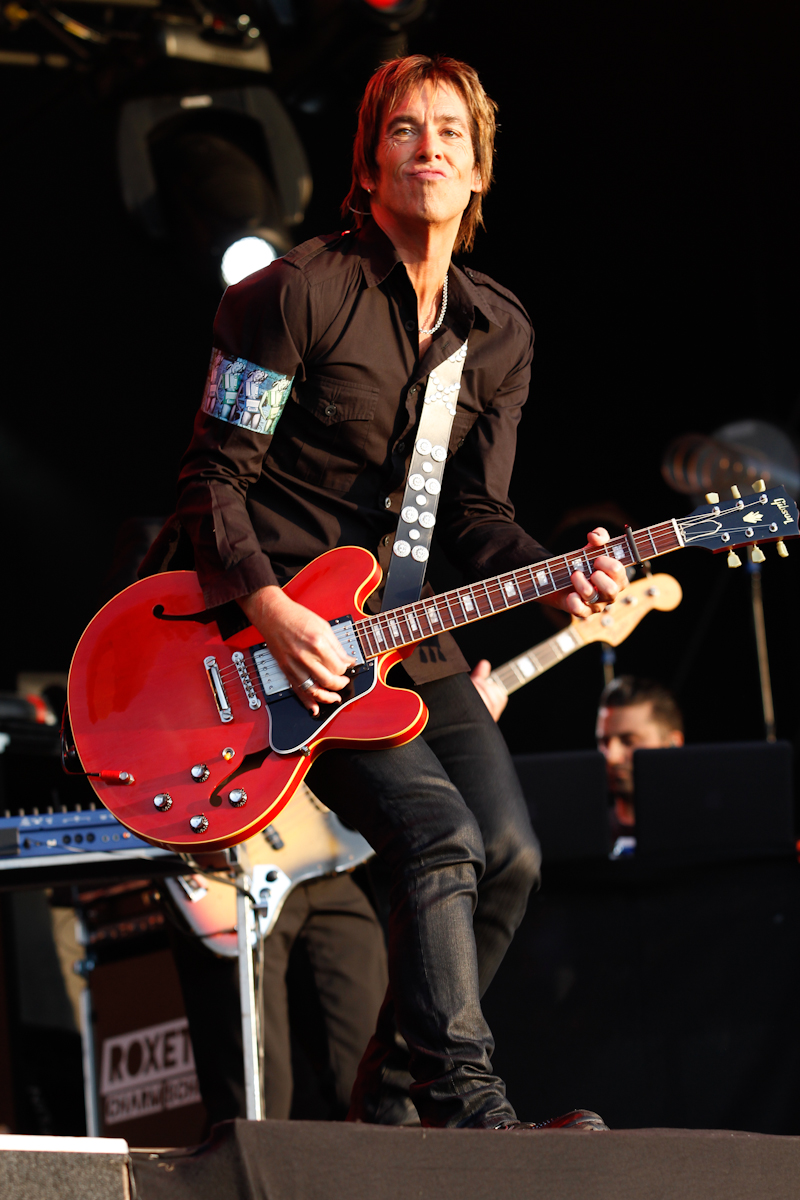
Marie Fredriksson (left) and Per Gessle (right), performing as Roxette at the Dutch music festival Bospop in 2011.

Swedish pop music duo Roxette were formed in 1986 by songwriter Per Gessle and vocalist Marie Fredriksson. Fredriksson died on 9 December 2019; she had been diagnosed with a brain tumour in 2002. Gessle had written the majority of Roxette's songs, but said he would not continue recording under the Roxette name following Fredriksson's death, saying instead that he wanted to find a new way to "keep the legacy of Roxette alive. I've written almost every song Roxette has recorded over the years, and they mean the world to me." He said: "Replacing Marie is impossible, and that was never my intention. Our Roxette era was a fantasy come true that we got to experience together. I look forward to continuing this journey, but in a different way. If Marie were still with us, we would of course do it together."

Gessle created the band name PG Roxette, and chose vocalists Helena Josefsson and Dea Norberg to sing on Pop-Up Dynamo!. Both singers had provided vocals on Gessle's previous work, either on his solo material or as backing vocalists on Roxette's later discography. The album was recorded alongside several other long-time contributors to Roxette, including keyboardist and producer Clarence Öfwerman, bassist Magnus Börjeson, and guitarists Jonas Isacsson and Christoffer Lundquist. "My Chosen One" features vocals from Swedish singer Léon. Pop-Up Dynamo! is dedicated to both Fredrikson and Roxette drummer Per "Pelle" Alsing, who died in 2020.

== Composition and style ==
"Walking on Air" was the first song Gessle wrote for Pop-Up Dynamo!, and was the template used to create the rest of the album. He sought to mix modern production techniques with the sound of previous Roxette albums Look Sharp! (1988) and Joyride (1991). The song was written at the request of the producers of Top Gun: Maverick, who asked him to compose a song for a scene in the film where a character is "dancing on a beach." He said the producers "never came back to me, so I kept the song for myself. I don't know if they didn't like it, or if they skipped that particular scene." Helena Josefsson sings lead vocals in the chorus, with overdubbed vocals by Dea Norberg.

Renowned for Sound described "Me and You and Everything In Between" as one of the album's highlights, and a possible single. The song was demoed by Gessle and Mats Persson in May 2020 at Tits & Ass Studio in Halmstad. Their demo was predominantly acoustic, but Clarence Öfwerman and Magnus Börjeson's production resulted in the song become more electronic; Gessle said their production made the song sound "like a hit single from a different era." "Headphones On" was written in March 2021 and was the last song composed for the album; it was written because Gessle felt the record needed another uptempo track. The track features a guitar solo by Roxette guitarist Jonas Isacsson, and the chorus features layered vocals from Gessle, Josefsson and Norberg. Co-producer Christoffer Lundquist was the vocal producer of the track.

"You Hurt the One You Love the Most" was co-written by Gessle with Dutch producer Giorgio Tuinfort, who had previously worked with artists including Michael Jackson, Whitney Houston and Lady Gaga. The song was written in February 2020 after Tuinfort commented during a writing session that he wanted to compose a song in the vein of Roxette's 1988 single "Listen to Your Heart". Gessle was initially dismissive and said he "laughed at bit" at the idea, but described the song as "beautiful". Numerous reviews favourably compared it to "Listen to You Heart". "Watch Me Come Undone" is a mid-tempo synth-pop ballad that features Dea Norberg singing lead vocals on the chorus.

Gessle wrote the majority of "The Craziest Thing" in February 2021, but said he struggled to write a chorus for the song. The eventual chorus was taken from an unreleased demo he co-wrote with Swedish musician Eddie Jonsson in the mid-1980s. Gessle said producers Öfwerman and Börjeson turned the song into an "80's bonanza ... with orchestra hits and everything. It made me laugh but I liked it." Barometern compared the track to the work of the Pet Shop Boys, as did Renowned for Sound, who also compared it to Kylie Minogue and the theme to the video game Mortal Kombat. "Debris" was written in June 2019, with its demo recorded at Tits & Ass Studio in the summer of 2020. The album version features vocals from Helena Josefsson and Dea Norberg in the chorus, with Lundquist performing Ondes Martenot.

"The Loneliest Girl in the World" was written in March 2020, and was initially more guitar-driven than the version that appears on Pop-Up Dynamo!. Gessle said producers Öfwerman and Börjeson altered the track considerably to make it fit alongside the rest of the album, a process which included removing the song's bridge. Renowned for Sound described it as an "infectious pop gem", and Barometern compared it to the work of The Cars. "Jezebel" was originally written as a country song, and was first demoed for Gessle's 2018 solo album Small Town Talk. The Pop-Up Dynamo! version was recorded in the spring of 2021 at Aerosol Grey Machine in Scania, and is the only song on the album produced by Lundquist. Gessle was initially reluctant to include it on the album, noting how different it was to the rest of the material. Barometern compared the song to Fleetwood Mac.

"My Chosen One" was written and demoed in December 2019 at Tits & Ass Studio, with lead vocals performed by Helena Josefsson. However, after Gessle heard a Léon song on Swedish radio, he invited her to sing lead on the track. Léon's vocals were recorded at Martin's Place in Stockholm, a studio owned by Dutch musician Martin Garrix. "Walk Right In" was composed by Gessle on piano in May 2020. He said its chord progression came "by accident. I played E minor then G minor instead of G major, which is the standard companion to the E minor chord." The song features extended vocal phrasing at the end of each line; Gessle realised he would be unable to perform the vocal, so invited Josefsson to sing on the demo. According to Gessle, producers Öfwerman and Börjeson "found a whole new angle" that was not present on the song's demo, explaining: "They created this bass and groove in a Giorgio Moroder-style that I didn't have on my demo at all. I thought it was really clever." Renowned for Sound said the song begins as "a sweet slow-burner, [but] quickly transforms into a disco-inspired Blondie/Donna Summer toe-tapper", describing it as a "memorable closing to the record."

== Release and promotion ==
The first release by PG Roxette was a cover of the Metallica song "Nothing Else Matters". The recording appeared on tribute album The Metallica Blacklist, released digitally in September 2021 and physically the following month, with all proceeds donated to charity. "The Loneliest Girl in the World" was released as the first single from Pop-Up Dynamo! on 3 June 2022, with a limited edition 7" vinyl single containing the b-side "Sunflower". A four-track digital EP was released on 15 July, featuring "Sunflower" and two remixes of the a-side by Bridge & Mountain.

"Walking on Air"
A 20-second sample of "Walking on Air". The song was written for Top Gun: Maverick, but was not included. Gessle used the track as a template when creating Pop-Up Dynamo!.

"Walking on Air" was issued as the album's second single on 23 September. The limited edition 7" vinyl featured the b-side "Necessary", and a remix of the a-side by Bridge & Mountain. A five-track digital EP containing "Walking on Air", "The Loneliest Girl in the World", "Necessary", "Sunflower", and the Bridge & Mountain remix of "Walking on Air" was also released that same date. "Walking on Air" peaked at number 37 on the Argentine Airplay Chart. "My Chosen One" was released as a digital single on 24 October, containing a remix of album track "Jezebel" by Bridge & Mountain as the b-side. "My Chosen One" peaked at number 39 on the Swiss Airplay Chart.

The non-album single "Wish You the Best for Xmas" followed on 18 November. It was issued as a limited edition red-coloured 7" vinyl single, backed by another Christmas song titled "Wishing on the Same Christmas Star". Digital versions of the single contained instrumental versions of both tracks. The single peaked at number fifty on the Swedish DigiListan chart. "Headphones On" was released as a single on 13 January 2023. The four-track Incognito EP was issued digitally and as a limited edition 7" vinyl on 28 April, featuring four previously unreleased tracks: "Incognito", "Jelly Moon", "When She Needed Me the Most", and a remix of "Incognito" by Lost Boys. A Lost Boys remix of "The Craziest Thing" was released as a single on 18 August, containing an exclusive b-side titled "Just Perfect". The Lost Boys remix of "The Craziest Thing" was used as the official song for the 2023 European Table Tennis Championships, held in Malmö in September 2023.

== Critical reception ==
Professional ratings
Review scores
Source	Rating
Aftonbladet	3/5 stars
Barometern	2/5 stars
Belgischer Rundfunk	Positive
Dagens Nyheter	3.5/5 stars
Expressen	Positive
Gaffa	3/6 stars
Göteborgs-Posten	3/5 stars
Renowned for Sound	Positive
Sydsvenskan	2/5 stars

The album received generally positive reviews from the Swedish music press, with several publications praising Gessle for expanding on the sound of previous Roxette albums. In their review, Aftonbladet said the ballads were the best songs on the album, but said Roxette fans would find the "danceable melodies and disco-pulsing synths" of the uptempo tracks appealing. Although they said Marie Fredriksson could never be replaced, and said the album plays like a tribute to her, they praised the vocals of Helena Josefsson and Dea Norberg. Expressen commented on the album's production aesthetic, saying Gessle "takes Roxette's legacy forward by glancing back fondly", summarising that Pop-Up Dynamo! is "a pretty fun retro rocker." Dagens Nyheter also described the album as "fun", and full of "exuberant and lustful sounds of the eighties". They went on to call Gessle a "pop genius", but said he should compose more challenging material to be successful artistically.

The album received some mixed reviews as well. Barometern lamented the loss of the acoustic sound of Gessle's latter solo work, describing the production of Pop-Up Dynamo! as "three steps back and one forward". Göteborgs-Posten criticised Gessle for continuing Roxette after the death of Marie Fredriksson, as did Gaffa, which said: "Instead of accepting defeat, Per Gessle chose to dust off his old synths and create a full-length album in the same style that gave Roxette four Billboard number ones."

International reception of the record was positive. Belgischer Rundfunk dubbed it the album of the week, saying that although Pop-Up Dynamo! signified the beginning of a new era of Gessle's discography, Roxette fans would "discover a lot of familiar elements in it, both musically and in the people involved". Renowned for Sound gave a glowing, detailed review of every track on the album, praising Gessle's decision to continue under the Roxette name. They summarised by saying Fredriksson would be "proud of the new songs Gessle has produced here. She may be gone, but she will always be within the very fabric of the Roxette name and the incredible legacy that she helped build and that will continue, hopefully for many years to come."

== Track listing ==
All lyrics are written by Per Gessle; all music is composed by Gessle, except track 4 by Gessle and Giorgio Tuinfort and track 6 by Gessle and Eddie Jonsson.

Pop-Up Dynamo!
No.	Title	Producer(s)	Length
1.	"Walking on Air"	Gessle; Clarence Öfwerman; Magnus Börjeson; Christoffer Lundquist^{[a]}	3:11
2.	"Me and You and Everything In Between"	Gessle; Öfwerman; Börjeson; Lundquist^{[a]}	3:32
3.	"Headphones On"	Gessle; Öfwerman; Börjeson; Lundquist^{[a]}	3:23
4.	"You Hurt the One You Love the Most"	Gessle; Öfwerman; Börjeson; Lundquist^{[a]}	4:16
5.	"Watch Me Come Undone"	Gessle; Öfwerman; Börjeson; Lundquist^{[a]}	3:43
6.	"The Craziest Thing"	Gessle; Öfwerman; Börjeson; Lundquist^{[a]}	3:11
7.	"Debris"	Gessle; Öfwerman; Börjeson; Lundquist^{[a]}	3:28
8.	"The Loneliest Girl in the World"	Gessle; Öfwerman; Börjeson; Lundquist^{[a]}	3:01
9.	"Jezebel"	Gessle; Lundquist	3:56
10.	"My Chosen One" (feat. Léon)	Gessle; Öfwerman; Börjeson; Lundquist^{[a]}	3:28
11.	"Walk Right In"	Gessle; Öfwerman; Börjeson; Lundquist^{[a]}	4:03
Total length:			39:12

Pop-Up Dynamo! – Digital deluxe edition
No.	Title	Producer(s)	Length
12.	"Sunflower"	Gessle	3:23
13.	"Necessary"	Lundquist; Gessle	3:03
14.	"Wish You the Best for Xmas" (feat. Helena Josefsson)	Andreas Broberger; Gessle	3:07
15.	"Wishing on the Same Christmas Star" (feat. Helena Josefsson)	Börjeson; Öfwerman; Gessle; Lundquist^{[a]}	3:47
16.	"Jezebel" (Bridge & Mountain Remix)	Gessle; Lundquist; Broberger^{[b]}	3:17
17.	"Walking on Air" (Bridge & Mountain Remix)	Gessle; Öfwerman; Börjeson; Lundquist^{[a]}; Broberger^{[b]}	3:14
18.	"The Loneliest Girl in the World" (Bridge & Mountain Remix)	Gessle; Öfwerman; Börjeson; Lundquist^{[a]}; Broberger^{[b]}	2:54
19.	"Necessary" (Long Version)	Lundquist; Gessle	3:49
20.	"Per Gessle Talks P-UD! - Album title"		1:01
21.	"Per Gessle Talks P-UD! - Background #1"		0:50
22.	"Per Gessle Talks P-UD! - Background #2"		0:46
23.	"Per Gessle Talks P-UD! - Background #3"		0:44
24.	"Per Gessle Talks P-UD! - Demo Recordings"		0:52
25.	"Per Gessle Talks P-UD! - Album Recordings #1"		0:47
26.	"Per Gessle Talks P-UD! - Album Recordings #2"		0:54
27.	"Per Gessle Talks P-UD! - Idea"		0:49
28.	"Per Gessle Talks P-UD! - Inspiration"		1:18
29.	"Per Gessle Talks P-UD! - Producers"		1:06
30.	"Per Gessle Talks P-UD! - Musicians"		1:36
31.	"Per Gessle Talks P-UD! - Singers #1"		0:40
32.	"Per Gessle Talks P-UD! - Singers #2"		1:09
33.	"Per Gessle Talks P-UD! - Record Sleeve"		0:48
34.	"Per Gessle Talks P-UD! - The Photo Shoot"		0:42
35.	"Per Gessle Talks P-UD! - The Video Shoot"		0:51
36.	"Per Gessle Talks P-UD! - The Future"		0:45
37.	"Per Gessle Talks P-UD! - Walking on Air"		1:13
38.	"Per Gessle Talks P-UD! - Me and You and Everything In Between"		0:50
39.	"Per Gessle Talks P-UD! - Headphones On"		0:53
40.	"Per Gessle Talks P-UD! - You Hurt the One You Love the Most"		1:19
41.	"Per Gessle Talks P-UD! - Watch Me Come Undone"		0:43
42.	"Per Gessle Talks P-UD! - The Craziest Thing"		1:13
43.	"Per Gessle Talks P-UD! - Debris"		1:00
44.	"Per Gessle Talks P-UD! - The Loneliest Girl in the World"		0:53
45.	"Per Gessle Talks P-UD! - Jezebel"		1:13
46.	"Per Gessle Talks P-UD! - My Chosen One"		0:59
47.	"Per Gessle Talks P-UD! - Walk Right In"		1:44
Total length:			93:00

Notes

- ^{^[a]} signifies a co-producer
- ^{^[b]} signifies a remixer

== Credits and personnel ==
Credits adapted from the liner notes of Pop-Up Dynamo!.

- All songs recorded at Tits & Ass Studio in Halmstad, Farozon in Malmö, and Aerosol Grey Machine in Scania between May 2020 and April 2021.
- Additional recording at Sweetspot in Harplinge, Martin's Place in Stockholm, and Jam Studio in Halmstad.
- All songs mixed by Ronny Lahti at Denebi Studios, Stockholm, except "Jezebel" mixed by Christoffer Lundquist at Aerosol Grey Machine, Scania.
- All songs mastered by Björn Engelmann at Cutting Room Studios in Stockholm.

Musicians and technical personnel

- Per Gessle – lead and background vocals, guitars, keyboards and production
- Helena Josefsson – lead and background vocals
- Dea Norberg – lead and background vocals
- Léon – lead vocals on "My Chosen One"
- Magnus Börjeson – bass guitar, guitars, keyboards, programming and engineering (at Farozon); production on all tracks except "Jezebel"
- Micke Ek – additional recording and engineering (at Jam Studio)
- Fredrik Etoall – photography
- Jonas Isacsson – guitar
- Staffan Karlsson – additional recording and engineering (at Sweetspot)
- Christoffer Lundquist – guitars, keyboards, ondes martenot and engineering (at Aerosol Grey Machine); co-production on all tracks except "Jezebel"; production on "Jezebel"
- Clarence Öfwerman – keyboards and programming; production on all tracks except "Jezebel"
- Mats "MP" Persson – engineering (at Tits & Ass Studio)
- Martin Stilling – additional recording and engineering (at Martin's Place)
- Pär Wickholm – sleeve design

== Charts ==
Weekly chart performance for Pop-Up Dynamo!
Chart (2022)	Peak position
German Albums (Offizielle Top 100)	37
Spanish Albums (PROMUSICAE)	100
Swedish Albums (Sverigetopplistan)	2
UK Album Sales (OCC)	72

== Release history ==
Region	Date	Label	Format(s)
Worldwide	19 October 2022	Elevator Entertainment · Parlophone	Digital download
Worldwide	28 October 2022	Elevator Entertainment · Parlophone	CD · Vinyl
