= Party Crasher Tour 2009 =

2009 concert tour by Per Gessle

Party Crasher Tour
- European tour by Per Gessle
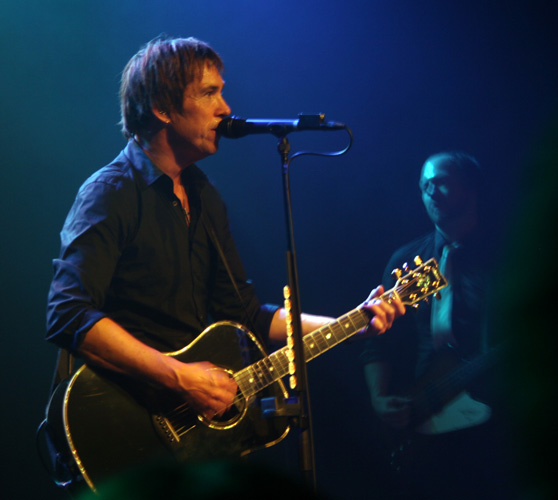
- Associated album: Party Crasher
- Start date: 16 April 2009
- End date: 10 May 2009
- Legs: 1
- No. of shows: 15

Per Gessle concert chronology
- En Handig Man pa Turne (2007); Party Crasher Tour (2009)

Party Crasher Tour 2009 is a club European tour by Per Gessle in support of his studio solo album Party Crasher. The tour was held in Europe from 16 April, till 10 May 2009. Along with the songs from the aforementioned CD, Gessle and his band played tracks by Roxette and from Gessle's solo albums like The World According to Gessle, Son of a Plumber, etc.

For Gessle's fans, as well as for Roxette's ones, this tour was important, because Marie Fredriksson joined Per on stage in Amsterdam and in Stockholm, which brought about the reunion of Roxette. This was confirmed when a press release stated they were to perform later in 2009 at the "Night of the Proms" series in Europe in October–December 2009.

On 28 March 2009, Helena Josefsson told on her official site, that her husband Martinique will play as support act during the tour. Before the tour started, three weeks rehearsals were held in Stockholm. Per also asked his fans at The Daily Roxette portal, which 3 songs would they like him to perform live. Thus, he wanted to choose some tracks he has never played live, which his fans would like to hear.

Two days before the tour started, on 14 April 2009, in Stockholm's Tyrol club, a promo concert was held for the band members' friends and the EMI officials.

Some of the material recorded from the tour was released as an album, Gessle over Europe.

On 6 May 2009, at the concert in Amsterdam, Marie Fredriksson joined Per onstage, to thunderous applause from the crowd. They sang "It Must Have Been Love".

== Tour dates ==
Date	City	Country	Venue
16 April 2009	Helsinki	Finland	Tavastia Club
19 April 2009	Oslo	Norway	Rockefeller
20 April 2009	Copenhagen	Denmark	Pumpehuset (moved)
22 April 2009	Warsaw	Poland	Stodola
23 April 2009	Prague	Czech Republic	Luccerna Hall
25 April 2009	Hamburg	Germany	Grunspan
27 April 2009	Cologne	Germany	Gloria Theatre
28 April 2009	Zürich	Switzerland	Kaufleuten
29 April 2009	Munich	Germany	Muffathalle
2 May 2009	Ghent	Belgium	Handelsbeurs
4 May 2009	London	England	O2 Islington Academy (moved)
6 May 2009	Amsterdam	Netherlands	Melkweg
8 May 2009	Halmstad	Sweden	Sporthallen
9 May 2009	Stockholm	Sweden	Cirkus
10 May 2009	Stockholm	Sweden	Cirkus

== Musicians ==
- Per Gessle — lead vocal, guitars, harmonica
- Clarence Ofwerman — keyboards
- Pelle Alsing — drums
- Christoffer Lundquist — guitars, backing-vocals
- Helena Josefsson — vocal, percussion
- Magnus Börjeson — bass-guitar, backing-vocals
- Marie Fredriksson — lead vocal (only in Amsterdam on 4 May and Stockholm on 10 May), for the songs "It must have been love" & "The Look")

== Playlist ==
1. "Dressed for Success"
2. "Drowning in Wonderful Thoughts about Her"
3. "Stupid"
4. "The Party Pleaser"
5. "Wish I Could Fly"
6. "She Doesn't Live Here Anymore"
7. "7 Twenty 7"
8. "I Have a Party In My Head (I Hope It Never Ends)"
9. "Late, Later on"
10. "Listen to Your Heart"
11. "Do You Wanna Be My Baby?"
12. "Opportunity Nox"
  band presentation
13. "Doesn’t Make Sense"
14. "Church of Your Heart"
15. "Dangerous"
16. "Joyride"
  extra
17. "C’mon"
18. "Are you an Old Hippie, Sir?"
19. "The Look"
20. "It Must Have Been Love"
  extra-extra
21. "Hey Mr. DJ (Won't You Play Another Love Song)" (Only in Gent (1st one), London and Stockholm)
22. "(I’m Not Your) Steppin' Stone"
23. "Sleeping in My Car" (beginning from Cologne)
24. "Queen of Rain"

== Newspaper reviews ==
- Swedish newspaper Dagens Nyheter writes a positive review about the first show of the tour in Tavastia club in Helsinki, Finland. Reporter Nils Hansson writes that according to the set list, Roxette must be back very very soon.
- Swedish tabloid Aftonbladet gave the first show 3 out of 5, as well as Expressen.
- After concert in Halmstad, the Swedish newspaper Hallandsposten called Gessle and his music "a symbol of summer in Sweden".
