= PG Roxette =

Swedish pop rock group

- Origin: Halmstad, Sweden
- Years active: 2021–present
- Labels: Elevator Entertainment; Warner Music; Parlophone
- Spinoff of: Roxette
- Members: Per Gessle; Helena Josefsson; Dea Norberg

PG Roxette is a Swedish pop rock group, established by Per Gessle in 2021.

== History ==
In September 2021, Per Gessle, Helena Josefsson, Dea Norberg, Clarence Öfwerman, Magnus Börjeson, Christoffer Lundquist and Jonas Isacsson contributed a cover of Metallica's "Nothing Else Matters" for the tribute album The Metallica Blacklist under the name PG Roxette.

In 2022, Gessle announced Roxette would continue under the name PG Roxette. He explained: "Since the 80's, my whole life has been spinning around Roxette and to this day it's still what excites me the most. At first, I wasn't sure which way to go, but as time passed by it became clear that I want to continue this. I want to keep the legacy of Roxette alive." He also said: "Replacing Marie is impossible, and that was never my intention. Our Roxette era was a fantasy come true that we got to experience together. I look forward to continuing this journey, but in a different way. If Marie were still with us, we would of course do it together."

PG Roxette's first studio album, Pop-Up Dynamo!, was released in October 2022. It features vocalists Helena Josefsson and Dea Norberg, who had both contributed to Gessle's previous work, either on his solo albums or as backing vocalists on Roxette's later discography and tours. The album was recorded alongside several other long-time Roxette contributors, including producer and keyboardist Clarence Öfwerman, guitarists Jonas Isacsson and Christoffer Lundquist, and bassist Magnus Börjeson. It was preceded by the release of the singles "The Loneliest Girl in the World" and "Walking on Air", the latter of which was originally written for the soundtrack to Top Gun: Maverick.

In November 2022, the band released the non-album single "Wish You the Best for Xmas",

In April 2023, the band released a four-track EP titled Incognito,

== Discography ==
=== Studio albums ===
List of studio albums by PG Roxette, with selected chart positions
Title	Album details	Peak chart positions			
Title	Album details	SWE	GER	SPA	UK Sales
Pop-Up Dynamo!	Released: 28 October 2022; Label: Elevator Entertainment · Parlophone; Formats: CD · LP · digital download	2	37	100	72

=== Extended plays ===
List of EPs, with selected details
Title	Details
Incognito	Released: 28 April 2023; Label: Elevator Entertainment · Parlophone; Label: digital download

=== Singles ===
List of singles by PG Roxette
Title	Year	Album
"The Loneliest Girl in the World"	2022	Pop-Up Dynamo!
"Walking on Air"	2022	Pop-Up Dynamo!
"My Chosen One" (featuring Leon)	2022	Pop-Up Dynamo!
"Wish You the Best for Xmas"	2022	non album single
"Headphones On"	2023	Pop-Up Dynamo!
"The Craziest Thing"	2023	Pop-Up Dynamo!

=== Promotional singles ===
List of promotional singles by PG Roxette
Title	Year	Album
"Nothing Else Matters"	2021	The Metallica Blacklist
