= Complainte pour Ste. Catherine =

Song written by Philippe Tatartcheff and Anna McGarrigle

Song by Kate & Anna McGarrigle

from the album Kate & Anna McGarrigle
- Genre: Pop
- Songwriter(s): Philippe Tatartcheff, Anna McGarrigle

"Complainte pour Ste. Catherine" is a song written by Canadians Philippe Tatartcheff and Anna McGarrigle. It was originally used as a B-side to another single, "Hommage à Henri Richard", which was written by McGarrigle and Richard Baker, and released in April 1974. It was intended to coincide with the Montreal Canadiens entry into the 1974 NHL playoffs, but failed to succeed commercially after the Canadiens lost to the New York Rangers. Kate & Anna McGarrigle then reused it for their debut album, Kate & Anna McGarrigle, released in December 1975, where it became a smash hit.

== Meaning ==
The lyrics are politically jokey, sung in the persona of a poor girl hanging around Sainte-Catherine street in Montreal, where in winter she and her buddies take advantage of the rising heat from the metro tunnel outlets, and in summer they continue the endless battle against mosquitoes. The Piaf-style plangent tune and heartrending harmonies undercut the devil-may-care tone of the lyrics, giving the song a tone of acerbic sweetness.

== Other versions ==
The original French version was covered by Kirsty MacColl as a bonus track on the CD edition of her 1989 album Kite.

Les Country Girls covered the song on their 2013 album Parties pour la gloire.

It was covered in Danish by the singer Anne-Grete on her debut album in 1980 under the title "Vintertur på strøget".

With lyrics in Swedish by Ola Magnell as "Ingen kommer undan politiken" ("No-one escapes politics"), the song was recorded by Marie Bergman on the 1977 album Närma mej, and by Marie Fredriksson in 2006 on the album Min bäste vän.

"Ingen kommer undan politiken"

Single by Marie Fredriksson

from the album Min bäste vän
- Released: July 25, 2006 (Sweden)
- Recorded: Stockholm, Sweden
- Genre: Pop
- Length: 3:44
- Label: Mary Jane/Amelia Music AB; EMI Sweden
- Songwriter(s): Philippe Tatartcheff, Anna McGarrigle, Ola Magnell
- Producer(s): Mikael Bolyos

Marie Fredriksson singles chronology
| "Sommaräng" (2006) | "Ingen kommer undan politiken" (2006) | "Ordet är farväl" (2007) |

The Marie Fredriksson version was also released as a digital single on 25 July 2006. It was the second single released from Marie Fredriksson's cover album Min bäste vän (My best friend), on both physical and digital formats. A promotional single (0946 3707622 4) was also released. "I owned the record by Kate and Anna McGarrigle and I was blown away by the way they sang it", Marie says.

The Marie Fredriksson version was also released as both a CD and digital singles on 25 July 2006.

=== Format of Fredriksson's version ===
Digital download
(July 25, 2006)

1. "Ingen kommer undan politiken" - 3:44

Swedish promotional CD
(0946 3707622 4; July 25, 2006)

1. "Ingen kommer undan politiken" - 3:44

=== Personnel on Fredriksson's version ===
- Vocals: Marie Fredriksson
- Keyboards and backing vocals: Mikael Bolyos
- Guitar: Jokke Pettersson
- Accordion: Bengan Jansson
- Violin: Kalle Moraeus
- Banjo: Edmund Benjamin
- Drums: Per Lindvall
- Bass: Sven Lindvall
- Backing vocals: Vincent Pontare
- Produced and arranged by: Mikael Bolyos
- Recorded by: Mikael Bolyos at Studio Vinden, and Roger Krieg at Cosmos Studio
