= Anne Grete (disambiguation) =

Anne-Grete (born 1947) is a Danish singer. It may also refer to:

- Anne Grete Hollup (born 1957), Norwegian writer
- Anne Grete Holmsgaard (born 1948), Danish politician
- Anne Grete Preus (1957–2019), Norwegian rock singer
- Anne-Grete Strøm-Erichsen (born 1949), Norwegian politician
