= Superman (Arash album) =

Studio album by Arash
- Released: 4 November 2014
- Venue: Sweden
- Genres: Persian pop, hip hop, R&B, reggaeton, dance music, house
- Length: 54 min
- Label: Warner Music Scandinavia

Arash chronology
Donya (2008)	Superman (2014)

Superman is the third studio album by the Iranian-Swedish Arash after self-titled Arash in 2005 and Donya in 2008.

The singles from the album include "Broken Angel", "Melody", "Iran Iran World Cup 2014", "She Makes Me Go" featuring Sean Paul and "Sex Love Rock n Roll (SLR)" featuring T-Pain.

== Track listing ==
1. "One Day" (feat. Helena) (3:32)
2. "Sex Love Rock n Roll (SLR)" (feat. T-Pain) (2:57)
3. "Tekoon Bede" (2:39)
4. "Superman" (feat. Nyanda) (3:31)
5. "Ba Man Soot Bezan" (3:31)
6. "She Makes Me Go" (feat. Sean Paul) (2:58)
7. "Doga Doga" (feat. Medina) (3:16)
8. "Ma Bala" (feat. Nyanda) (3:11)
9. "Delhore" (3:20)
10. "Melody" (3:12)
11. "Broken Angel" (feat. Helena) (3:12)
12. "Che Konam" (3:04)
13. "On Est La" (3:02)
14. "Boro Boro" (feat. Nexus) (2:56)
15. "Sex Love Rock n Roll (SLR) (Basshunter Remix) (feat. T-Pain) (3:49)
16. "One Day" (Golden Star Mix) (feat. Helena) (3:00)
17. "Iran Iran World Cup 2014" (3:14)
