= Hey Mr. DJ (Won't You Play Another Love Song) =

2006 single by Per Gessle

Single by Per Gessle feat. Helena Josefsson

from the album Son of a Plumber
- B-side: "Plumber in Progress #1"
- Released: 1 February 2006
- Studio: The Aerosol Grey Machine, Vallarum, Scania
- Length: 3:36
- Label: Elevator Entertainment; Capitol Records
- Songwriter: Per Gessle
- Producers: Clarence Öfwerman; Christoffer Lundquist; Gessle

Per Gessle feat. Helena Josefsson singles chronology
""C'mon"/"Jo-Anna Says"" (2005)	"Hey Mr. DJ (Won't You Play Another Love Song)" (2006)	"I Like it Like That" (2006)

"Hey Mr. DJ (Won't You Play Another Love Song)" is a song by Swedish musician Per Gessle, released on 1 February 2006 as the second single from his 2005 album Son of a Plumber. A duet with Swedish musician Helena Josefsson, who contributed vocals to several tracks on the album, numerous publications praised her vocals and described it as the best track on the record. The song written by Gessle and produced by him alongside Clarence Öfwerman and Christoffer Lundquist. The single was a hit in Sweden, peaking at number 23 and spending over three months on the Swedish Singles Chart. It also entered the Dutch Single Top 100.

A music video featuring Roxette vocalist Marie Fredriksson's children was created for "Hey Mr. DJ". The single contained the B-side "Plumber in Progress #1", a compilation of song fragments recorded by Gessle in his home studio. Several remixes of the A-side were created, and were issued on a remix single on 1 March. A separate EP titled Dancing Plumber, Vol. 1, also containing two remixes of album track "I Never Quite Got over the Fact That the Beatles Broke Up", followed on 6 April.

== Composition and style ==
"Hey Mr. DJ (Won't You Play Another Love Song)" was written by Per Gessle, recorded at Aerosol Grey Machine in Vallarum, Scania, and produced by Gessle alongside Christoffer Lundquist and Clarence Öfwerman. The song is a duet with Swedish vocalist Helena Josefsson, who provided vocals to several tracks on the Son of a Plumber album. Gessle compared it to the work of American rock band Chicago, saying: "It's very easy for songs like this to become pure parodies and we were in a bad mood for a while, but in the end we got it right, I think. It's very neat." The song contains strings and brass instrumentation.

== Critical reception ==
Swedish publications compared "Hey Mr. DJ (Won't You Play Another Love Song)" to the work of Burt Bacharach, with Aftonbladet also comparing it to the work of The Carpenters. Multiple publications described it as the best song on Son of a Plumber. Josefsson received praise for her vocals. A writer for Svenska Dagbladet said her performance "must be highlighted", saying her voice "leaves me wanting more". They claimed the track would have been better had Josefsson sung it entirely, saying her voice was preferable to Gessle's. Despite giving the album a negative review and calling the song "sugary", Dagensskiva praised Josefsson's vocal performance. Expressen called the song "a lovely duet", while Göteborgs-Posten said the song was "amazing" and "completely irresistible".

== Release and promotion ==
The first CD single for the song was issued in Sweden on 1 February 2006. This release contained "Hey Mr. DJ (Won't You Play Another Love Song)" as the A-side alongside an exclusive B-side: "Plumber in Progress #1". "Plumber in Progress #1" is a compilation of song fragments recorded by Gessle in his home studio, one of which features Gessle's son. Another single containing two remixes of the A-side was issued on 1 March. An EP titled Dancing Plumber, Vol. 1 followed on 6 April. This release was only issued digitally, and contained two remixes of the A-side and two remixes of Son of a Plumber album track "I Never Quite Got over the Fact That the Beatles Broke Up".

=== Music video ===
Roxette vocalist Marie Fredriksson's children appear as members of an orchestra in the song's music video. The filming of the video was one of only a few occasions Gessle and Fredriksson spent time together following her 2002 brain tumour diagnosis. Gessle commented: "She is doing well. I invited her to the recording of the video 'Hey Mr. DJ'. Her children are part of the orchestra in the video, so I was able to spend some time with her. She's fine and having a great time."

== Commercial performance ==
The single entered the Swedish Singles Chart at number 27 on the chart dated 9 February 2006, peaking at number 23 two weeks later. It spent a total of fourteen weeks on the chart. The single also entered the Dutch Singles Chart.

== Formats and track listings ==
- CD single (0946 354274 2–4)
1. "Hey Mr. DJ (Won't You Play Another Love Song)" (Original Version featuring Helena Josefsson) – 3:36
2. "Plumber in Progress #1" – 8:20
- Remix CD single (0946 359143 2–0)
1. "Hey Mr. DJ (Won't You Play Another Love Song)" (Original Version feat. Helena Josefsson) – 3:36
2. "Hey Mr. DJ (Won't You Play Another Love Song)" (Love-For-Sale Remix feat. Helena Josefsson) – 3:50
3. "Hey Mr. DJ (Won't You Play Another Love Song)" (Jimmy Monell Treatment) – 3:43
- Dancing Plumber, Vol. 1 (0946 359872 5–6)
1. "Hey Mr. DJ (Won't You Play Another Love Song)" (Love-For-Sale Remix feat. Helena Josefsson) – 3:50
2. "Hey Mr. DJ (Won't You Play Another Love Song)" (Jimmy Monell Treatment) – 3:43
3. "I Never Quite Got over the Fact That the Beatles Broke Up" (Jimmy Monell Short Treatment) – 2:27
4. "I Never Quite Got over the Fact That the Beatles Broke Up" (Jimmy Monell Long Treatment) – 5:39

== Credits and personnel ==
Credits adapted from the CD single liner notes.

Recorded and mixed by Christoffer Lundquist, Clarence Öfwerman and Per Gessle at Aerosol Grey Machine, Vallarum, Scania.

- Kjell Andersson – cover design
- Anton Corbijn – cover photography
- Per Gessle – composition, vocals, instrumentation and production
- Lennart Haglund – assistant engineer
- Jens Jansson – drums
- Helena Josefsson – vocals
- Christoffer Lundquist – vocals, instrumentation, engineer, production, string and horn arrangement; remixing ("Love-For-Sale" Remix)
- Jimmy Monell – remixing ("Love-For-Sale" Remix; Jimmy Monell Treatments)
- Clarence Öfwerman – vocals, instrumentation, production, string and horn arrangement; remixing ("Love-For-Sale" Remix)
- Pär Wickholm – cover design
- The Funky Färs Härads Chamber Orchestra – strings and horns

== Charts ==
Chart (2006)	Peak; position
Netherlands (Single Top 100)	98
Sweden (Sverigetopplistan)	23

== Release history ==
Region	Date	Format(s)	Label(s)	Ref.
Sweden	1 February 2006	CD	Elevator Entertainment; Capitol Records	
Sweden	1 March 2006	Remix CD	Elevator Entertainment; Capitol Records	
Sweden	6 April 2006	Dancing Plumber, Vol. 1	Elevator Entertainment; Capitol Records	
