= Broken Angel (song) =

Single by Arash featuring Helena

from the album Superman
- Language: English; Persian
- Released: 8 August 2010
- Recorded: 2010
- Label: Warner Music
- Songwriters: Tobias Bejerholm Johan, Thomas G:Son, Arash Labaf Alex, Erik Uhlmann Robert

Arash featuring Helena singles chronology
"Dasa bala" (2010)	"Broken Angel" (2010)	"Glorious" (2010)

"Broken Angel" is a single by Iranian singer Arash, which was released in 2010 by Warner Music. It features Swedish singer Helena with Marianne Puglia appearing in the music video. The music video of this song is the most-viewed music video of Arash YouTube channel. On 5 December 2025, Norwegian DJ Alan Walker and DJ Steve Aoki, under the name Lonely Club, released a remaster with electronic elements, as well as the album "Broken Angel (This is Lonely Club) [Remixes]" that has 6 Songs, And has remixes of Alex Skrindo, K-391, Auto-Remixes, and a Extended version.

== Track listing ==
CD single
No.	Title	Length
1.	"Broken Angel"	3:11

CD maxi-single
No.	Title	Length
1.	"Broken Angel" (Payami Dub Version)	5:27
2.	"Broken Angel" (Dark Heaven Radio Mx)	3:45
3.	"Broken Angel" (Ali Payami Remix)	5:56

== Charts ==
=== Weekly charts ===
Chart (2010–2024)	Peak position
CIS Airplay (TopHit)	3
European Hot 100 Singles	39
Greece (IFPI)	12
Hungary (Single Top 40)	38
Kazakhstan Airplay (TopHit)	90
Russia Airplay (TopHit)	1
Ukraine Airplay (TopHit)	9

=== Monthly charts ===
Chart (2011)	Position
Russia Airplay (TopHit)	3
Ukraine Airplay (TopHit)	12

=== Year-end charts ===
2010 year-end chart performance for "Broken Angel"
Chart (2010)	Peak position
Russia Airplay (TopHit)	130

Chart (2011)	Position
Russia Airplay (TopHit)	7
Russian Digital Singles	14
Ukraine Airplay (TopHit)	59

2012 year-end chart performance for "Broken Angel"
Chart (2012)	Position
Russia Airplay (TopHit)	174

2025 year-end chart performance for "Broken Angel"
Chart (2025)	Position
Kazakhstan Airplay (TopHit)	169

== Certifications ==
Region	Certification
Russia (NFPF)	5× Platinum
