= Sandy Mouche =

Swedish indie-pop band

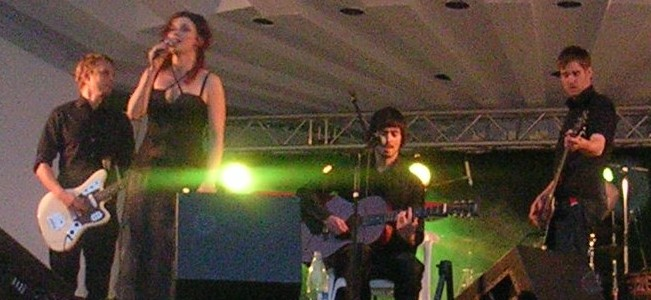
- Performing in Lund, 2005

Background information
- Origin: Lund, Skåne County, Sweden
- Years active: 2001–present
- Members: Helena Josefsson; Martinique Josefsson; Per Blomgren; Ola Blomgren

Sandy Mouche is a Swedish band from Lund, Skåne County. It consists of songwriter and singer couple Martinique and Helena Josefsson, and brothers Per (drums) and Ola (guitar) Blomgren. For live shows, they bring in a bassist and a pianist. They sing in English and French.

== History ==
=== Formation ===
Sandy Mouche was formed in autumn 2001. Helena and Martinique were on holiday in Crete, Greece, with Per (who had played with Helena in other bands for six years) and his girlfriend, Hanna. Martinique played his song, "A Year" for the group. It was then that they collectively decided to form a band.

=== The E.P. (2003) and White Lucky Dragon (2004) ===
The band recorded demos in Per's bedroom, and in a studio along with Danyal Taylan, who would play the bass from then point until 2004. Sandy Mouche recorded and released an EP, which they sent to producer Christoffer Lundquist, whom the band felt to be "the perfect collaborator". Sandy Mouche decided they would release their first album, White Lucky Dragon (2004) on their own label, Magpie Music. White Lucky Dragon was released in Sweden and Japan.

=== ...and poems for the unborn (2006) ===
The album ...and poems for the unborn was released in 2006. It was self-financed, with Playground Music Scandinavia and Junk Music handling the distribution. It was recorded and mixed over a 10-day period. Unlike the first album, the songwriters wrote separately for their second album, which resulted in a more diverse release than their debut, counting ABBA, jazz, disco, pop and even children's music among its influences. According to the band, they made the kind of album they would like to buy themselves.

Writing in Östersunds-Posten David Stark described the album as "very fragmented" and "sadly packaged" while a review in Smålandsposten described the album as "easy to digest and easy to forget". Svenska Dagbladet were more positive, with a review by Dan Backman describing the album as "romantic, whimsical soft rock".

=== Glory and Grace (2013) ===
For several years after 2006, the band members mostly worked on solo projects. Helena Josefsson released two solo albums, and toured with Roxette. The band members also had several children, and struggled to find time for Sandy Mouche. However, after Per Blomgren constructed his own studio, the group met to work together on songs. In 2013, they released Glory and Grace.

=== Since 2013 ===
As of 2017, the band has been largely inactive.

== Critical reception ==
In a scathing 2007 review of one of Helena Josefsson's solo albums, Göteborgs-Posten described Sandy Mouche as "a pop band, annoying in every way" and "the worst thing to come out of Scania since spettekaka".

== Discography ==
=== Albums ===
- Sandy Mouche (EP) (2003)
- White Lucky Dragon (2004) (released in Sweden and Japan)
- ...and poems for the unborn (2006) (released in Sweden, Belgium and Australia)
- Glory and Grace (2013)

=== Singles ===
- "Cherry Pie" (2003) (promo)
- "C'est pas juste" (2004) (promo)
- "Papillon" (2004) (promo)
- "Une histoire" (2005)
- "In the Sand" (2005)
- "Spiderweb Suit" (2005)
- "Papillon" (2006) (France promo)
- "Evening Wake, Morning Flake" (2006) (to Belgian radio)

=== Music videos ===
- "Cherry Pie" (dir. Johan Tholsson)
- "C'est pas juste" (dir. Per and Ola Blomgren)
- "Papillon" (dir. Jeffry Rich)
