= C'mon/Jo-Anna Says =

"C'mon"/"Jo-Anna Says"

Single by Per Gessle

from the album Son of a Plumber
- Released: 4 November 2005
- Recorded: November 2004 – September 2005
- Studio: The Aerosol Grey Machine, Vallarum, Scania
- Length: 2:58 ("C'mon"); 3:23 ("Jo-Anna Says")
- Label: Elevator Entertainment; Capitol Records
- Songwriter(s): Per Gessle
- Producer(s): Clarence Öfwerman; Christoffer Lundquist; Gessle

Per Gessle singles chronology
"Tycker om när du tar på mej" (2003)	"C'mon" / "Jo-Anna Says" (2005)	"Hey Mr. DJ (Won't You Play Another Love Song)" (2006)

"C'mon"/"Jo-Anna Says" is a double A-side single released by Swedish musician Per Gessle as the first single from his Son of a Plumber album. Issued on 4 November 2005, the single was a top five hit on the Swedish Singles Chart, and was one of the best-selling singles of the year in the country. "C'mon" is a glam rock song, while music journalists compared "Jo-Anna Says" to the psychedelic pop work of The Beatles. The artwork for the cover was shot by Anton Corbijn.

== Composition and style ==
"C'mon" is a glam rock song, and is the first track in Gessle's discography to feature him singing in falsetto throughout. His then-eight year old son was involved in the song's composition. His son, who was learning to play guitar at the time, entered Gessle's home studio and began imitating his singing and guitar playing while the song was being composed. Gessle said: "I thought that sounded so sweet, so I recorded it."

Gessle compared "Jo-Anna Says" to the early solo work of Paul McCartney. Despite describing himself as "more of a Lennon guy actually", he said he appreciated McCartney's early 1970s solo material. In 2014, Gessle described "Jo-Anna Says" as "a really cool song. It's got a classic pop touch to it which I like." The track was composed when Gessle was driving with his family in the south of Sweden, saying the "melody just popped up in my head". He noted Roxette songs "Vulnerable" (from 1994's Crash! Boom! Bang!) and "7Twenty7" (from 1999's Have a Nice Day) were written in a similar fashion. He said "when songs come to you that easily, they're always gonna be good", and that he "felt really early on that this is gonna be one of the major tracks on the album."

== Release and promotion ==
The single was released in Sweden on 4 November 2005, with the cover photograph taken by Anton Corbijn. Gessle said it was "almost impossible" to decide which track to issue as the first single from Son of a Plumber, explaining that there was no individual song that "directly represents the record." As a result, he chose to release "C'mon" and "Jo-Anna Says" as a double A-side. "C'mon" was chosen because he said the song "doesn't sound like it's me", while "Jo-Anna Says" was chosen because "well, if you throw up on 'C'mon', you might like it instead." Music journalists compared the latter track to the psychedelic pop work of The Beatles.

"Jo-Anna Says" was one of three demos Gessle recorded for the Son of a Plumber album, and its demo appeared as a free download on his official website in 2006. Gessle performed the song at Swedish sports award ceremony Fotbollsgalan on 14 November 2005.

== Commercial performance ==
The single spent seventeen weeks on the Swedish Singles Chart, peaking at number five for two weeks. It was one of the best-selling singles of 2005 in the country.

== Track listing ==
- Swedish CD single (0946 346484 2–4)
1. "C'mon" – 2:58
2. "Jo-Anna Says" – 3:23

== Credits and personnel ==
Credits adapted from the CD single liner notes.

Recorded and mixed by Christoffer Lundquist, Clarence Öfwerman and Per Gessle at Aerosol Grey Machine, Vallarum, Scania between November 2004 and September 2005.

- Kjell Andersson – cover design
- Anton Corbijn – cover photography
- Per Gessle – composition, vocals, instrumentation and production
- Lennart Haglund – assistant engineer
- Jens Jansson – drums
- Helena Josefsson – vocals
- Christoffer Lundquist – vocals, instrumentation, engineer and production
- Clarence Öfwerman – vocals, instrumentation and production
- Pär Wickholm – cover design

== Charts ==
=== Weekly charts ===
Weekly chart performance
Chart (2005)	Peak; position
Sweden (Sverigetopplistan)	5

=== Year-end charts ===
Year-end chart performance
Chart (2005)	Position
Sweden (Sverigetopplistan)	68
