= Jessica Nettelbladt =

Swedish director and documentary filmmaker

Jessica Maria Nettelbladt
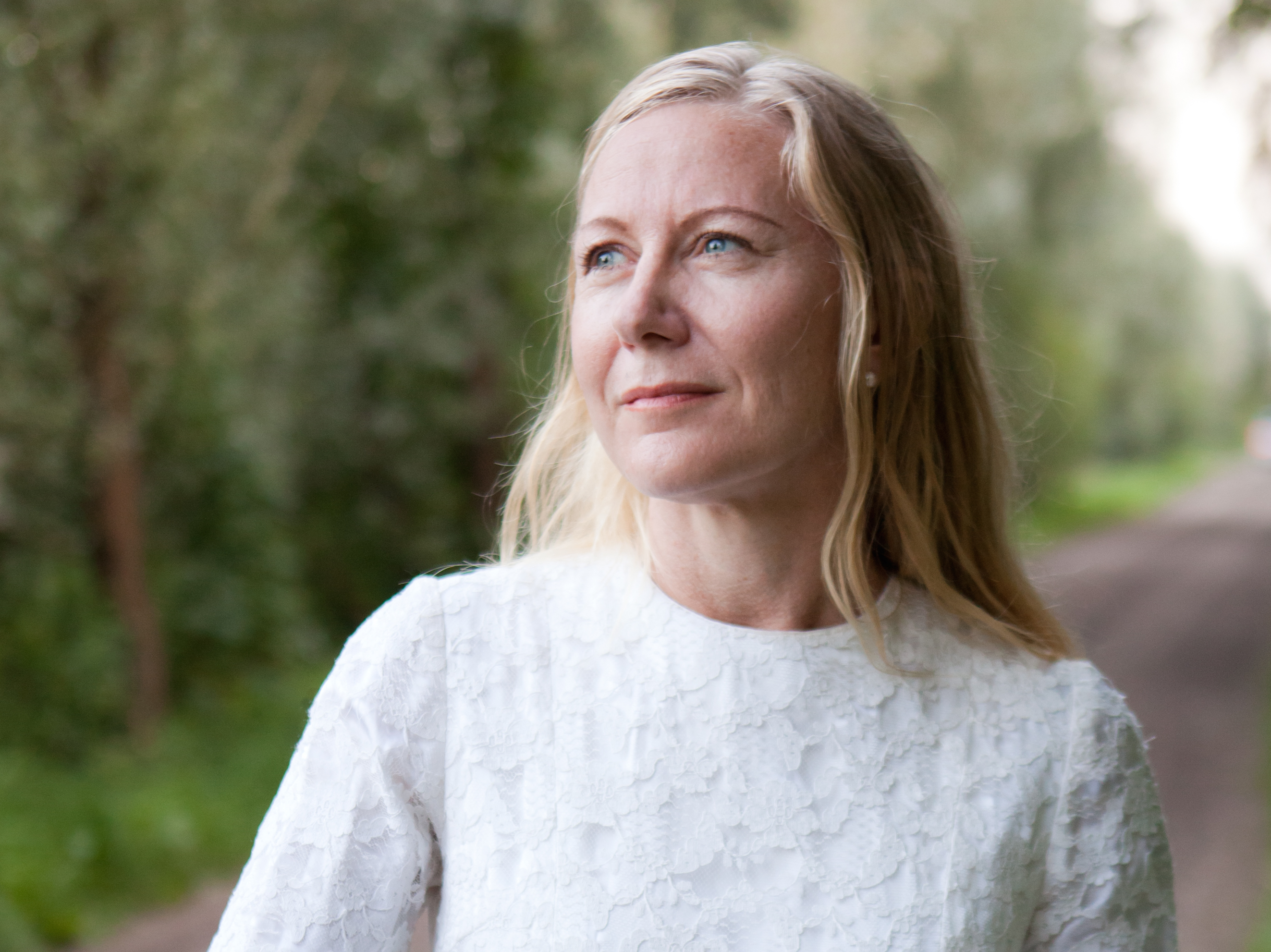
- Born: 7 August 1972 (age 53); Malmö, Sweden
- Occupation: Film director
- Years active: 1993 – present

Jessica Maria Nettelbladt (born 7 August 1972, in Malmö) is a Swedish director and documentary filmmaker, specializing in personal interviews.

== Biography ==
Nettelbladt attended the Stockholm Academy of Dramatic Arts and received her master's degree in independent filmmaking from the University of Gothenburg. She currently runs the production company Lejoni Produktions.

Her documentary, I Am My Own Dolly Parton, featuring interviews with Gudrún Hauksdóttir, Helena Josefsson, Cecilia Nordlund, The Cardigans' Nina Persson and Lotta Wenglen, premiered at the Tempo documentary film festival on March 11 and later at New York at the Tribeca Grand as part of the Nordic Music Documentary Festival. The film began as a Dolly Parton tribute concert but evolved into a work about independent musicians, role models and parenthood. The film was nominated best documentary at Zürich Filmfestival.

Her feature film Monalisa Story was praised by critics. It had its world premiere, and in competition as best Nordic documentary at CPH:DOX December 2015. In 2016 MonaLisa Story was nominated best documentary at Tempo Awards and at Nordisk Panorama. MonaLisa Story achieved Nordic Doc special jury award. It was also nominated to best documentary at Swedish Guldbagge awards 2017.

In 2019 she made the drama documentary Funkiskungen in collaboration with the director Stefan Berg.

Her latest feature documentary Prince of Dreams (Drömprins, Swedish title) was, in the spring of 2021, selected for a number of film festivals around the world, for example Tempo, where it's up for best documentary, CPH DOX, American Documentary and Animation Film Festival, Krakow Film Festival and Carmarthen Bay Film Festival in Wales. During the summer of 2021, Prince of Dreams was also nominated for best documentary at the Moscow International Documentary Film Festival, KASHISH Mumbai International Queer Film Festival in India, where it's up for best documentary, as well as Madrid International Film Festival in the category of best director, best editing and best documentary. Prince of Dreams has also been chosen as the inaugural film for World Pride 2021 Malmö on August 13. Nettelbladt was awarded with best director of foreign language film for her documentary Prince of Dreams at Madrid international filmfestival 2021.

In 2021 she received Malmö City Human rights prize for her work in meeting, following, understanding and portraying vulnerable and exclusion in the society.

== Filmography ==
- 2002 – Kärlek är
- 2003 – Livets hjul
- 2005 – Vägen till Pärleporten
- 2007 – Minnen dör aldrig
- 2007 – I Edens Lustgård
- 2008 – Under stjärnorna i Malmö
- 2009 – Mitt Helvete
- 2011 – Jag_är_min_egen_Dolly_Parton
- 2016– MonaLisa_Story
- 2019– Funkiskungen
- 2019– Prince of Dreams

== Books ==
- Att leva och överleva som dokumentärfilmare (2012)
- Röster innanför murarna (2018)
