= One Day (Arash song) =

Single by Arash featuring Helena

from the album Superman
- Released: 12 March 2014
- Length: 3:30
- Label: Extensive Music
- Songwriters: Tobias Bejerholm Johan; Arash Labaf Alex; Erik Uhlmann Robert

Arash featuring Helena singles chronology
"She Makes Me Go" (2014)	"One Day" (2014)	"Sex Love Rock n Roll (SLR)" (2014)

Music video
- "ARASH feat Helena - ONE DAY (Official Video)" on YouTube

"One Day" is a single by Iranian singer Arash featuring Swedish singer Helena. The song was released on 12 March 2014.

== Track listing ==
CD single
No.	Title	Length
1.	"One Day" (Radio Edit)	3:33
2.	"One Day" (Golden Star Radio Mix)	2:58

CD maxi-single
No.	Title	Length
1.	"One Day" (Original)	3:33
2.	"One Day" (Golden Star Radio Mix)	2:58
3.	"One Day" (Arash Club Remix)	4:39
4.	"One Day" (Golden Star Extended)	4:11
5.	"One Day" (Alexx Slam & Mickey Martini Remix)	5:45

== Charts ==
=== Weekly charts ===
Chart (2014)	Peak position
Romania (Airplay 100)	15
Russia Airplay (TopHit)	6
Ukraine Airplay (TopHit)	6

2026 weekly chart performance
Chart (2026)	Peak position
Saudi Arabia (IFPI)	5

=== Year-end charts ===
Chart (2014)	Position
Ukraine Airplay (Tophit)	15
