= Cecilia Nordlund =

- Birth name: Mette Marie Cecilia Nordlund
- Born: Östersund
- Genres: rock, pop
- Occupation: Musician
- Instrument: vocals
- Years active: 1991–present
- Labels: Margit Music

Mette Marie Cecilia Nordlund (born 13 September 1973 in Östersund, Jämtland) is a Swedish songwriter, singer, composer and guitarist from Malmö. She has been part of the bands Souls, Monkeystrikes and Sunshine Rabbits, and has released solo work under the stage name Cilihili.

== Biography ==
Nordlund joined the band Souls in Helsingborg in 1991 with Johan Karlsson (bass), Andreas Danielsson (guitar) and Tony Fideke (drums). They released two albums, both produced by Steve Albini, and opened for Bush and Veruca Salt in the US. After Souls disbanded, Nordlund founded the band Monkeystrikes with Christoffer Lundquist of Brainpool. They released one album, You Hate My Beautiful Love, in 2005. Nordlund released a solo album, Not Listening, in 2009 under the stage name Cilihili.

Nordlund has directed music videos for Marit Bergman, Fever Ray and Helena Josefsson. She sings on Bergman's "Adios Amigos" and Fever Ray's "Keep the Streets Empty for Me." She also composed the soundtracks for The Socialist, the Architect and the Twisted Tower (2005).

Nordlund appears, with Josefsson, Gudrún Hauksdóttir, The Cardigans' Nina Persson and Lotta Wenglen, in the 2011 documentary I Am My Own Dolly Parton, directed by Jessica Nettelbladt, which premiered at the Tempo documentary film festival. She is active with Sweden's Popkollo series of music camps for girls

== Discography ==
- Not Listening – 2009
