= Kyss Mej =

Studio album by Helena Josefsson
- Released: 9 February 2011
- Recorded: 2009–2010: Aerosol Grey Machine Studio, Vallarum (Sweden)
- Genre: Indie pop
- Length: 35:19
- Label: EMI
- Producer: Christoffer Lundquist

Helena Josefsson chronology
Dynamo (2007)	Kyss Mej (2011)

Singles from Kyss Mej
- 1. "Fen & jag" Released: 17 October 2009; 2. "Kyss mej" Released: 10 February 2010; 3. "Nån annanstans, nån annan gång" Released: 7 December 2010

Kyss Mej (English: Kiss me) is the second studio solo album by Swedish indie-pop singer Helena Josefsson in Swedish, released on 9 February 2011.

== Track listing ==
1. Nån annanstans, nån annan gång (3:22)
2. Päronskogen (3:17)
3. Grönöga (2:51)
4. I spegeln (feat. Timbuktu) (4:00)
5. Knockout (4:05)
6. Ballad till Jorden (2:48)
7. Vi kan börja om (To Tragoudi Ton Gifton) (3:44)
8. Inuti hjärtat (3:01)
9. Kyss mej (2:57)
10. Fén & jag (3:04)
11. Vi möts igen nånstans (2:10)

== Videos ==
- «Fen & jag» (first published on YouTube 17 October 2009)
- «Kyss mej» (2010) (dir. Cecilia Nordlund)
