= Min bäste vän =

Studio album by Marie Fredriksson
- Released: 14 June 2006
- Recorded: Winter 2005–06
- Studio: Studio Vinden, Djursholm; Cosmos Studios, Stockholm; St:Eriksplan 1, Stockholm
- Genre: Pop rock
- Length: 41:42
- Language: Swedish
- Label: Mary Jane/Amelia Music; Capitol
- Producer: Mikael Bolyos

Marie Fredriksson chronology
The Change (2004)	Min bäste vän (2006)	Tid för tystnad (2007)

Singles from studio
- 1. "Sommaräng" Released: 17 May 2006; 2. "Ingen Kommer undan Politiken" Released: 25 July 2006

Min bäste vän (My Best Friend) is the seventh studio album by Swedish singer-songwriter Marie Fredriksson, released on 14 June 2006 by Capitol Records in conjunction with Fredriksson's own independent record label Mary Jane/Amelia Music. It is her sixth studio album of Swedish material, following her first and only English album The Change (2004).

== Composition and style ==
The album is made up of cover versions of songs which Fredriksson first heard in the 1960s and 1970s, and consists predominantly of songs written by Swedish singer-songwriters John Holm ("Din bäste vän", "Sommaräng" and "Den öde stranden") and Pugh Rogefeldt ("Guldgruva", "Aftonfalken" and "Här kommer natten"), as well as songs by Mikael Wiehe of the Hoola Bandoola Band ("Man måste veta vad man önskar sig" and "Vem kan man lita på?"). Fredriksson said she chose these tracks as they left an impression on her during adolescence, and helped to develop and shape her as a singer and songwriter in later life.

== Release and promotion ==
"Sommaräng" was released as the album's lead single on 17 May 2006, backed by an exclusive b-side, a cover of Rogefeldt's "Små lätta moln" ("Small Light Clouds"). The song was a hit in Sweden, peaking within the top ten of the airplay-based Svensktoppen chart, and at number 21 on the Swedish Singles Chart. The album was also successful, peaking at number three on the albums chart in Sweden. "Ingen kommer undan politiken" – a cover of Kate & Anna McGarrigle's "Complainte pour Ste. Catherine" with Swedish lyrics written by Ola Magnell – was released as an airplay-only promotional single in Sweden from 25 July.

== Critical reception ==
Professional ratings
Review scores
Source	Rating
Aftonbladet	3/5 stars
Expressen	3/5 stars
Helsingborgs Dagblad	3/5 stars
Svenska Dagbladet	4/5 stars
Verdens Gang	3/5 stars

The album received generally positive reviews upon release. Aftonbladet called it "a rather unassuming comeback", and said that Fredriksson "still has one of the country's strongest, most distinctive voices, which becomes even better when she's singing material which genuinely means something to her." They described "Den öde stranden" as the best song on the record. A writer for Expressen argued that the acoustic tracks on the album were superior to the more produced ones, explaining: "When there is enough space for all of her emotions to spit out, Marie comes across like a country goddess, and a master of Swedish blues." Norwegian newspaper Verdens Gang called it a "cracking disc", but complained that most songs would be unfamiliar to fans in Norway, and described the album as "surely a must-have for the most faithful Roxette fans, although for most others, it will be easy to forget."

Helsingborgs Dagblad praised Fredriksson for compiling a "courageous" record, saying: "Putting together an album of rock classics from '70s favourites such as Pugh Rogerfeldt, John Holm, Cornelis Vreeswijk, Hoola Bandoola Band, Tom Paxton and Tim Hardin is probably a thought that scares the shit out of the majority of established artists with any sense of self-esteem. But such embarrassment does not exist [for Min bäste vän]. From the first track, she makes it clear that this is not an attempt to murder these songs, but to introduce them to others for them to love for years to come." They also complimented the quality of Fredriksson's vocals and the amount of improvisation found on the album, particularly Ola Gustafsson's guitar work on "Sommaräng" and Mats Ronander's harmonica playing on "Guldgruva".

== Track listing ==
No.	Title	Writer(s)	English translation	Length
1.	"Din bäste vän"	John Holm	"Your Best Friend"	4:07
2.	"Sommaräng"	Holm	"Summer Meadow"	3:20
3.	"Om jag vore arbetslös"	Tim Hardin; Cornelis Vreeswijk	"If I Were Unemployed"	3:32
4.	"Guldgruva"	Pugh Rogefeldt	"Goldmine"	2:52
5.	"Ingen kommer undan politiken"	Philippe Tatartcheff; Anna McGarrigle; Ola Magnell	"Nobody Escapes Politics"	3:46
6.	"Jag ger dig min morgon"	Tom Paxton; Fred Åkerström	"I Give You My Morning"	5:06
7.	"Aftonfalken"	Rogefeldt	"The Evening Falcon"	3:55
8.	"Man måste veta vad man önskar sig"	Mikael Wiehe	"You Have to Know What You Want"	3:31
9.	"Vem kan man lita på?"	Wiehe	"Who Can You Trust?"	4:13
10.	"Den öde stranden"	Holm	"The Deserted Beach"	3:17
11.	"Här kommer natten"	Rogefeldt	"Here Comes the Night"	3:51

== Credits and personnel ==
Credits adapted from the liner notes of Min bäste vän.

- All tracks recorded at Studio Vinden in Djursholm and Cosmos Studios in Stockholm; saxophones on track 9 recorded at St:Eriksplan 1 in Stockholm.
- All songs produced and arranged by Mikael Bolyos.
- Mastered by Björn Engelmann and Thomas Eberger at Cutting Room Studios in Stockholm.

Musicians

- Marie Fredriksson – lead and background vocals, keyboards (track 3)
- Micke Bolyos – background vocals (tracks 5 and 7), piano (track 6), keyboards, programming, engineering and mixing
- Staffan Astner – guitars (tracks 7 and 11)
- Ola Gustavsson – guitars (tracks 2, 3, 8 and 10), bass guitar (tracks 3 and 8), slide guitar (track 7)
- Per Lindvall – drums (tracks 3, 5, 7, 8, 9 and 11) and percussion (track 3)
- Sven Lindvall – bass guitar (tracks 5, 9 and 11)
- Jokke Pettersson – guitars (tracks 1, 3, 4, 5 and 9)
- Vincent Pontare – background vocals (tracks 5 and 9)

Additional musicians and technical personnel

- Maja Alderin-Landgren – background vocals (track 9)
- Kjell Andersson – sleeve design
- Edmund Benjamin – banjo (track 5)
- Tore Berglund – tenor and baritone saxophones (track 9)
- Petra Cabbe – make-up
- Mattias Edwall – photography
- Karin Hammar – trombone (track 8)
- Bengan Janson – accordion (track 5)
- Christer Jansson – drums (track 8)
- Roger Krieg – engineering and mixing
- Kalle Moraeus – violin (track 5)
- Mats Ronander – harmonica (track 4)
- Pär Wickholm – sleeve design

== Charts ==
Chart (2006)	Peak position
Swedish Albums (Sverigetopplistan)	3

== Release history ==
Region	Date	Format	Label	Catalog #	Ref.
Sweden	14 June 2006	CD; digital download	Mary Jane/Amelia Music; Capitol Records	0946 3 66887–2 5	
