= Sommaräng =

1972 John Holm song

Single by Marie Fredriksson

from the album Min bäste vän
- B-side: "Små lätta moln"
- Released: May 17, 2006 )Sweden)
- Recorded: Stockholm, Sweden
- Genre: Pop
- Length: 3:28
- Label: Mary Jane/Amelia Music AB; EMI Sweden
- Songwriter: John Holm
- Producer: Mikael Bolyos

Marie Fredriksson singles chronology
"A Table In The Sun" (2006)	"Sommaräng" (2006)	"Ingen kommer undan politiken" (2006)

Alternative covers
- Back artwork - Swedish CD single

"Sommaräng" ("Summer meadow") is a song written by Swedish singer and composer John Holm, that was the first single released from Marie Fredriksson's 2006 cover album Min bäste vän. It was the only commercial single released off the album.

It spent 13 weeks in the Swedish Singles Chart, peaking at #8 in the first week.

No video was ever shot for the song. However, Marie made a guest appearance in two TV shows where "Sommaräng" was performed: 'TV-huset' (May 14, 2006) and 'Bingolotto' (June 5, 2006).

== Formats and track listings ==
Swedish CD single
(0946 3657482 0; May 17, 2006)

1. "Sommaräng" (John Holm) - 3:28
2. "Små lätta moln" (Small light clouds) (Pugh Rogefeldt) - 1:42

== Personnel ==
- Marie Fredriksson – vocals
- Mikael Bolyos – keyboards, programming, producer, arranger, recording
- Ola Gustavsson – guitar
- Roger Krieg – mixing
- Thomas Eberget – mastering
- Mattias Edwall – photography
- Kjell Andersson – artwork
- Pär Wickholm – artwork
- Petra Cabbe – makeup

== Chart positions ==
Marie Fredriksson version

Chart (2006)	Peak position
Sweden	21
