= Anne-Grete =

Danish singer

Anne-Grete Rendtorff (born 1947) is a Danish singer, who was most popular in the 1980s. She was a member of Van Dango in the period 1975–1981. In 1980 she launched her solo career. Anne-Grete is probably best known for the song "Vintertur på strøget", which is a cover of "Complainte pour Ste-Catherine" by Kate & Anna McGarrigle. This song is also covered by Marie Bergman: "Ingen kommer undan politiken". In 1984 she had a local pop hit, recording a Danish version of Kenny Rogers and Dolly Parton's "Islands in the Stream" with Peter Thorup.

== Solo albums ==
- Anne-Grete (1980)
- Vinden vender (1982)
- Labyrint (1983)
- Farlig som ild (1984)
- Verden er gal (1987)
- Lad livet leve (1991)
- Mellem mine hænder (1993)

== Compilations ==
- Skibe uden sejl (1998)
