= Harplinge =

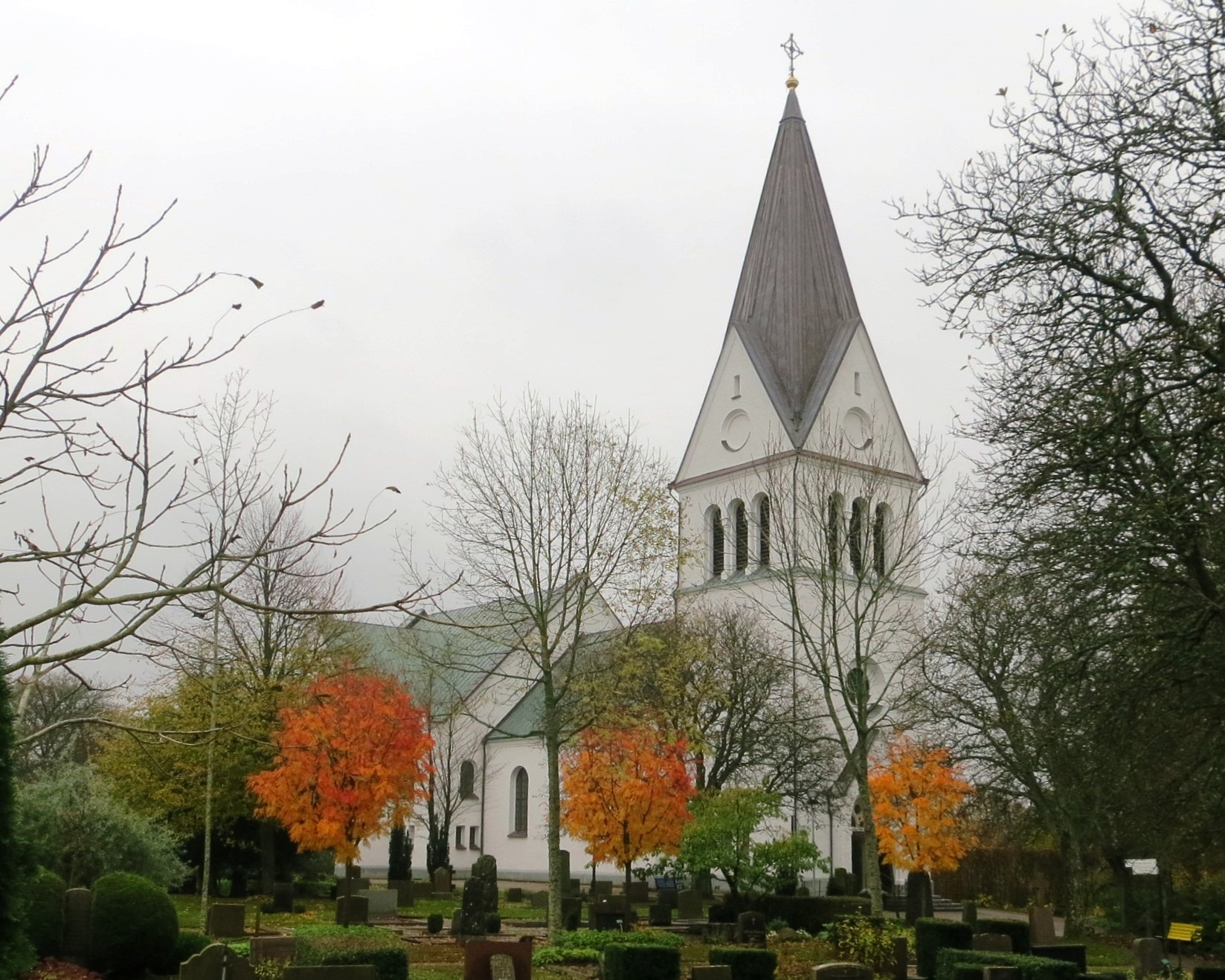
- Harplinge Church

- Location within Halland Location within Sweden
- Coordinates: 56°45′N 12°43′E
- Country: Sweden
- Province: Halland
- County: Halland County
- Municipality: Halmstad Municipality

Area
  - Total: 1.46 km^{2} (0.56 sq mi)

Population (31 December 2020)
  - Total: 1,597
  - Density: 1,090/km^{2} (2,830/sq mi)
- Time zone: UTC+1 (CET)
  - Summer (DST): UTC+2 (CEST)

Harplinge is a locality situated in Halmstad Municipality, Halland County, Sweden, with 1,597 inhabitants in 2020. The village is known for its beautiful surroundings and its nature.
