= Son of a Plumber =

Studio album by Per Gessle
- Released: 23 November 2005
- Recorded: November 2004 – August 2005
- Studio: Aerosol Grey Machine, Scania
- Genre: Pop
- Length: 30:33 (LP#1); 41:39 (LP#2)
- Language: English; French
- Label: Elevator Entertainment; Capitol
- Producer: Clarence Öfwerman; Christoffer Lundquist; Per Gessle

Per Gessle chronology
Mazarin (2003)	Son of a Plumber (2005)	En händig man (2007)

Singles from Son of a Plumber
- 1. "C'mon"/"Jo-Anna Says" Released: 4 November 2005; 2. "Hey Mr. DJ (Won't You Play Another Love Song)" Released: 2 February 2006; 3. "I Like It Like That" Released: 19 May 2006

Son of a Plumber is the fifth solo album by Swedish singer-songwriter Per Gessle, released on 23 November 2005 by Capitol in conjunction with Gessle's own label Elevator Entertainment. The record was originally issued pseudonymously as Son of a Plumber, although a 2021 reissue includes Gessle's name on the album cover, and it now appears as part of his solo discography on music download and streaming services. The album was recorded at Christoffer Lundquist's Aerosol Grey Machine studio in Scania, and was produced by Gessle, Lundquist and Clarence Öfwerman. It features vocals from Swedish vocalist Helena Josefsson.

Despite containing only of an hour of music, Gessle chose to release Son of a Plumber as a double album, saying he was inspired by the vinyl LPs he listened to as a child. He described the record as an homage to the music he listened to in his youth, and said it contained relatively personal lyrics. The album received generally positive reviews upon release. Numerous publications described it as his best release to date, and noted influences from 1960s psychedelic pop and folk rock acts.

The first single from the album was the double A-side "C'mon"/"Jo-Anna Says", which was issued on 7 November 2005 and reached the top five of the Swedish Singles Chart. "Hey Mr. DJ (Won't You Play Another Love Song)" and "I Like It Like That" were also released as singles, along with a remix EP titled Dancing Plumber, Vol. 1. A fourth single, "Substitute (For the Real Deal)", was cancelled when Gessle resumed work with Roxette. Son of a Plumber was a commercial success upon release, being certified platinum by the Swedish Recording Industry Association and spending two weeks at number one on the Swedish Albums Chart.

== Background and recording ==
Per Gessle is the lead songwriter of Swedish acts Gyllene Tider and Roxette. In addition to this, he released material as a solo artist; his 2003 album Mazarin is his most successful solo record, spending thirteen weeks at number one on the Swedish Albums Chart, and selling over 335,000 copies in Sweden as of January 2005. In 2004, Gyllene Tider reformed to celebrate their 25th anniversary, releasing the studio album Finn 5 fel!, their first new material since 1996. That album was also successful, selling 230,000 copies in Sweden by January 2005. Finn 5 fel! was promoted by a concert tour of Sweden, with the band performing to over 58,000 people in a single night at the Ullevi stadium in Gothenburg, breaking an attendance record previously held by Bruce Springsteen.

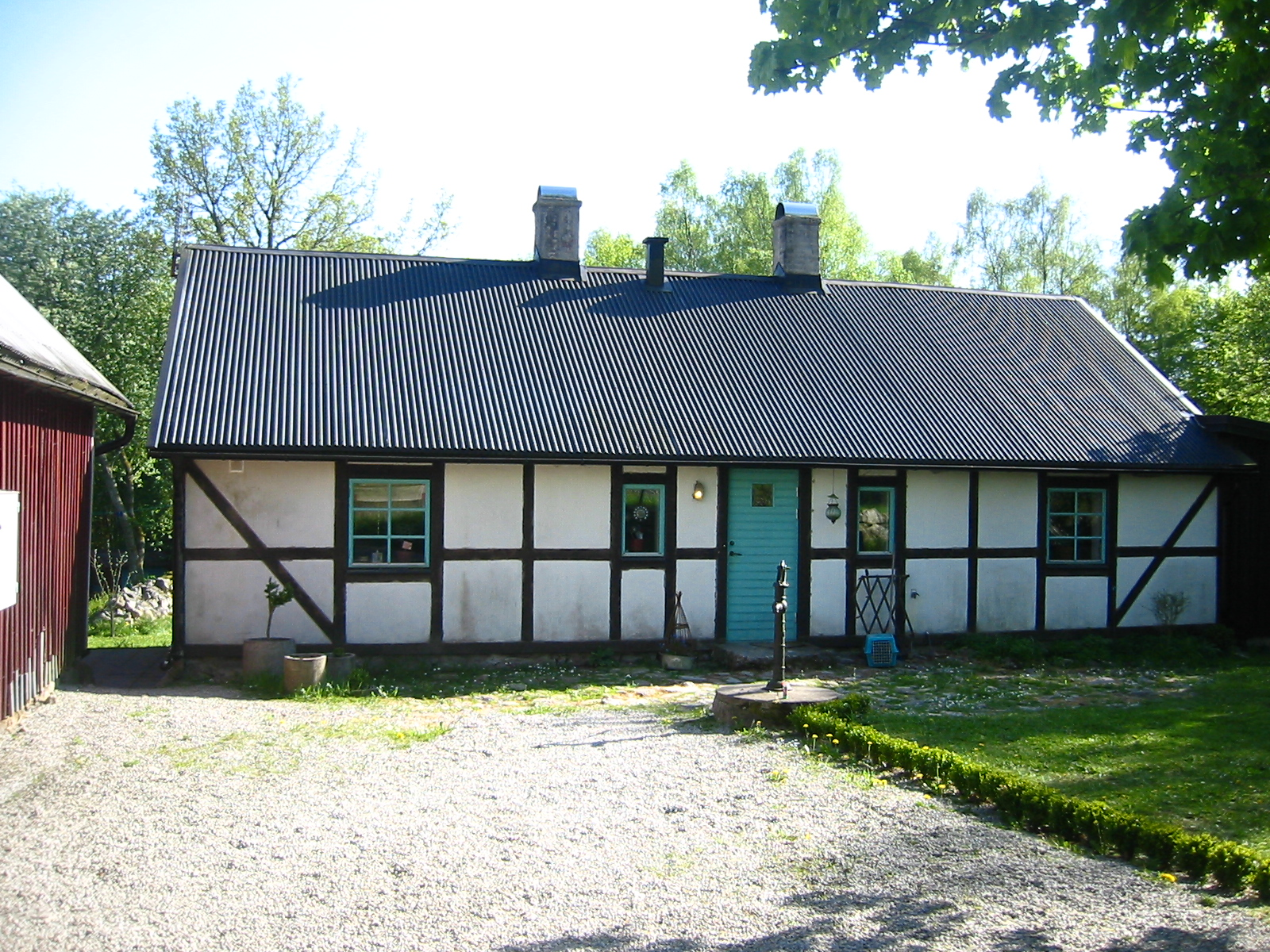
The album was recorded at Christoffer Lundquist's Aerosol Grey Machine studio in Vallarum, Scania.

Rather than release his next album as a solo artist, or with Gyllene Tider or Roxette, (Note: Roxette vocalist Marie Fredriksson was diagnosed with a brain tumour in 2002, but the duo reconvened to recorded two new songs for A Collection of Roxette Hits: Their 20 Greatest Songs! in 2006.) Gessle chose to work under the pseudonym Son of a Plumber. Producer Clarence Öfwerman initially suggested the idea of working under a pseudonym, saying that recording an album under a new name could liberate Gessle creatively. Gessle said he was reluctant to release another Swedish-language album following the success of Mazarin and Gyllene Tider, and that he wanted Son of a Plumber to "feel like a debut, for my own sake. Because I'm afraid people will get tired of me." He chose the Son of a Plumber pseudonym as a tribute to his father Kurt Gessle, who was a plumber.

Son of a Plumber was recorded between November 2004 and August 2005 at Christoffer Lundquist's Aerosol Grey Machine studio in Scania, and was produced by Gessle, Öfwerman and Lundquist. They mixed the record at the same studio from August to October 2005. The album was recorded by many of the same musicians who contributed to Mazarin, including Lundquist and Öfwerman, and vocalist Helena Josefsson. Gessle claimed the studio – built in an old farm house – is haunted, and that he experienced paranormal events during recording.

The album differs from Gessle's previous work, in that he created only three demos prior to recording sessions beginning in November 2004. Gessle said this was done at the behest of Öfwerman, who had worked with Gessle since 1986 and complained that he was "far too prepared before recording sessions". Gessle elaborated that he often created "very advanced demos. Demos that sometimes sound exactly like the end result." Instead, he performed the songs live in the studio on an acoustic guitar, which he said gave Öfwerman and Lundquist "a much better chance of influencing" the songs during the recording process.

Two of the previously recorded demos – "Something in the System" and "I Like It Like That" – were created during sessions for Roxette's 2003 compilation The Pop Hits, while a demo for "Jo-Anna Says" was recorded in January 2005. All three demos were released for free download on Gessle's official website in 2006. Two of the bonus tracks were also previously recorded: "A Girl Like You" was demoed for Roxette's 1999 album Have a Nice Day, but was not included on that record, while "Keep the Radio On (This Is the Perfect Song)" appeared on 1995's The Lonely Boys, a collaborative album recorded alongside Nisse Hellberg of Wilmer X.

== Composition and style ==
Son of a Plumber is a double album consisting of 24 songs, with the albums labelled LP#1 and LP#2 respectively. Despite being approximately 60 minutes in length, Gessle chose to release the record as a double CD. He said this was done to simulate the experience he had listening to vinyl as a child, saying he wanted listeners to "feel that moment when one side of the vinyl ran out and you had to turn to the next. You had no idea what to expect from the other side. It was always a wonderful moment for me." He described the album as an homage to the music he listened to as a child, specifically music released between 1969 and 1972. He said he rediscovered much of this music when transferring his vinyl collection to an iPod. The record utilises panning techniques commonly found in late 1960s and early 1970s recordings, most notably drums appearing on the left channel and vocals appearing on the right channel.

Gessle said the album contains relatively personal lyrics, and that it was best experienced when listened to in its entirety. He wanted it to be a cohesive album, elaborating that it "doesn't have eighteen number one singles on it, but that was never the intention. It's a well-rounded, harmonious album and if you like it, you can play it again and again." In 2014, Gessle said he considers Son of a Plumber "to be probably my best album. I think it's got a great vibe to it; great writing and a great production and it's just a very organic record that I really enjoy."

Swedish music publications primarily described Son of a Plumber as a pop album, albeit one that contains influences from 1960s and 1970s folk rock and psychedelic pop. Aftonbladet called it a "strange, highly personal mishmash of pop, psychedelia, singer-songwriter anthems, glam rock, West Coast rock and little instrumental Spaghetti Western songs." Nöjesguiden noted influences from acts such as Swedish band Hep Stars, The Beatles and Paul McCartney's solo work, as well as Elton John's collaborations with Kiki Dee, and said the album as a whole could be described as psychedelic power pop. Musiklandet compared it to the work of late 1960s and early 1970s British psychedelic rock and progressive rock bands Marmalade, Love Affair, Dantalian's Chariot and McGuinness Flint. They also compared it to several albums released in 1967, including Between the Buttons by the Rolling Stones, The Who Sell Out, Pink Floyd's The Piper at the Gates of Dawn, and the discography of Andrew Loog Oldham's label Immediate Records. Sydsvenskan said it contained "echoes" of The Kinks, The Monkees, Serge Gainsbourg, Burt Bacharach, and Simon & Garfunkel.

=== Songs ===
Expressen described the first disc as "playful", but said the second disc was the stronger of the two. Hallandsposten said "LP#1 seems to look out into the world while LP#2 rather looks inward towards the soul." The first song is "Drowning in Wonderful Thoughts About Her", a power pop song inspired by 1960s psychedelia. Gessle composed "Jo-Anna Says" while driving with his family in the south of Sweden. He said Roxette tracks "Vulnerable" and "7Twenty7" – from 1994's Crash! Boom! Bang! and 1999's Have a Nice Day respectively – were written in a similar way, and that he thinks "Jo-Anna Says" is "a really cool song. It's got a classic pop touch to it which I like." He compared it to the early solo work of Paul McCartney. Gessle said "I Have a Party In My Head (I Hope It Never Ends)" is his favourite song on the album, saying the track "turned out exactly as I had imagined it." It is a folk rock song featuring vocals from Helena Josefsson, Indian flutes, and acoustic guitars.

"C'mon" is a glam rock track, and is the first song in Gessle's discography to feature him singing in falsetto. Gessle's then-eight-year-old son was involved in its writing. He said his son entered the studio and started imitating him while it was being composed. Gessle said he "thought that sounded so sweet, so I recorded it." "Week with Four Thursdays" is the first of several instrumental songs on the album. "Hey Mr. DJ (Won't You Play Another Love Song)" is a duet with Helena Josefsson, which Expressen described as the best song on the album. Gessle compared it to the work of Chicago, while Aftonbladet described it as a mix between Burt Bacharach and The Carpenters. "Late, Later On" is a power ballad, while "Ronnie Lane" is an instrumental piece named after a member of Faces. The final five tracks on LP#1 are merged as a medley, titled "The Junior Suite".

"Kurt - The Fastest Plumber in the West"
The song is a tribute to Gessle's father, who was a plumber.

LP#2 opens with "Kurt - The Fastest Plumber in the West", an instrumental song inspired by the music of Spaghetti Western films. The song is named after his father, and is dedicated to him. Expressen compared "I Never Quite Got over the Fact That the Beatles Broke Up" to the work of Air. "Substitute (For the Real Deal)" is a pop song featuring tambourines and hand-claps. "Waltz for Woody" is an instrumental piece dedicated to Gessle's wife Åsa. He explained "Woody" is her nickname, but said: "I actually don't know why. That's just her name." It is the only song on the record where Gessle performs keyboards. "Carousel" is a folk pop song, and features a string section.

Gessle said the final five songs on LP#2 contains some of his favorite tracks on the record, saying "I Like It Like That" contained the strongest chorus on the entire album. "Something Happened Today" is an acoustic track, and a love song. Expressen described "Brilliant Career" as "insanely cute", while Aftonbladet compared "Burned Out Heart" to the work of Pink Floyd and Queen. The album concludes with a reprise of "Drowning in Wonderful Thoughts About Her", and "Making Love or Expecting Rain", which begins with a church organ and features an outro sung in French. Expressen said the latter song exemplifies Gessle in "top form". A hidden reprise of "Jo-Anna Says" – titled "Jo-Anna Says Farewell" – is the final song on the album. On CD versions, the reprise plays after ten minutes of silence.

== Release and promotion ==
Son of a Plumber was issued in Sweden on 23 November 2005, on CD, vinyl, and as a digital download. It was released by Gessle's own label Elevator Entertainment, under exclusive license to labels including EMI Music Sweden, and Cosmos Music Group. CD versions were released with copy protection. This led to criticism from consumers, who claimed the disc would not operate on some conventional CD players. The album was issued throughout mainland Europe from 6 March 2006.

Gessle chose not to tour Sweden in support of the record, focusing instead to promote it via television and media interviews. He performed at Swedish sports award ceremony Fotbollsgalan on 14 November 2005, and said he hoped to tour European theatres should the album be successful outside of Sweden. In late 2005, Gessle and Roxette vocalist Marie Fredriksson appeared together in London during an awards gala hosted by Broadcast Music, Inc., where Gessle received several awards. It was one of their first public appearances together since Fredriksson's brain tumour diagnosis in 2002.

Four songs were released from the album as singles. The double A-side single "C'mon"/"Jo-Anna Says" was issued on 4 November 2005, and peaked at number five on the Swedish Singles Chart. Second single "Hey Mr. DJ (Won't You Play Another Love Song)" entered the Swedish Singles Chart at number 27 on the chart dated 9 February 2006, peaking at number 23 two weeks later. The single also entered the Dutch Singles Chart. Fredriksson's children appear as members of an orchestra in its music video. A single containing two remixes of "Hey Mr. DJ" was issued on 10 March, with a remix EP titled Dancing Plumber, Vol. 1 following on 31 March. The latter contained the two previously released remixes of "Hey Mr. DJ", and two unreleased remixes of "I Never Quite Got over the Fact That the Beatles Broke Up". "I Like It Like That" was released as the third and final single from the album on 19 May 2006. "Substitute (For the Real Deal)" was scheduled to be issued as album's fourth single, although its release was cancelled to make way for the compilation A Collection of Roxette Hits: Their 20 Greatest Songs!, which was issued in October 2006.

Instrumental versions of songs from Son of a Plumber later appeared on the soundtrack to Jonas Åkerlund's 2012 film Small Apartments. An extended version of Son of a Plumber was released digitally in 2021, containing a third disc of b-sides, remixes and demo recordings. This version included Gessle's name on the cover, and the album now appears as part of his solo discography on Apple Music and Amazon Music.

== Artwork ==
The album cover was created by Pär Wickholm and Kjell Andersson, while Anton Corbijn provided photography for the booklet. The booklet includes two pencil and watercolour drawings made by Gessle when he was approximately seven years old. The drawings represent a handball match and an ice hockey match, with the latter showing Swedish ice hockey player Kjell-Rune Milton scoring a goal against Brynäs IF. The booklet also includes a photograph of Gessle's parents, taken on their silver wedding anniversary, as well as pictures of Gessle's wife and son.

== Critical reception ==
Professional ratings
Review scores
Source	Rating
Aftonbladet	2/5 stars
Expressen	4/5 stars
Göteborgs-Posten	4/5 stars
Hallands Nyheter	4/5 stars
Hallandsposten	Positive
Nerikes Allehanda	4/5 stars
Nöjesguiden	4/5 stars
Norrbottens-Kuriren	4/5 stars
Svenska Dagbladet	5/6 stars
Sydsvenskan	2/5 stars

The album received generally positive reviews from the Swedish music press. Svenska Dagbladet said it contained some of the best songs Gessle had ever written. They noted the album's disparate influences and called Gessle a "pop nerd" and a postmodernist, elaborating that he was "freely quoting and, to a lesser extent, deconstructing pop music history". They highlighted the production and musicianship of Öfwerman, Lundquist, and Josefsson, and called the album "a musical statement worth taking seriously". Both Göteborgs-Posten and Norrbottens-Kuriren expressed similar sentiments, with the former dubbing it a gourmet version of Gessle's work with Roxette and Gyllene Tider, while the latter complimented Gessle for creating a "fresh and exciting" project.

Hallands Nyheter described the album as a tribute to 1960s pop music and compared it to the Beatles's self-titled album, saying both releases featured unpredictable music. Hallandsposten commended Gessle for releasing an album not defined by commercial expectations, saying the record may have sold more copies were it shorter in length. Expressen praised the quality of songwriting, saying that many of the tracks sound like hit singles, and that the album leaves "a most unsatisfied longing for more" despite being a double album. Nöjesguiden praised the scope of musicality found on the record, complimenting Gessle for "playing with sounds, harmonies and moods from his favourite records of the early seventies."

Nerikes Allehanda praised the high quality of the 25 songs on Son of a Plumber, and described it as an "astonisingly personal" record despite containing "so many different sources of inspiration". Gradvall called the record Gessle's "prettiest release to date", saying it demonstrates his "astonishing breadth" as a songwriter. They highlighted the album's instrumental tracks, calling them "amazingly good instrumental songs that sound better than all the film music made in Sweden in the last 30 years."

The album also received some mixed reviews. Dagensskiva said it contained songs that would have been better suited to Roxette's discography. Aftonbladet complained about the album's length, saying it contained too much filler. Sydsvenskan compared it negatively to Gessle's work with Gyllene Tider and Roxette, saying it did not contain enough potential singles. Conversely, Musiklandet noted criticism of the album seemed to focus on how Gessle chose not to "trot out one potential hit song after another", and that this demonstrated "with embarrassing clarity, that said journalists have no idea about the pop history from which Gessle picks one delicious pop praline after another. Because Per Gessle knows his music history. He belongs to a category [of musicians] that loves English pop of the late 1960s, a period of time which is still unmatched when it came to putting together three-minute pop masterpieces", a style their writer described as "the most difficult style of music there is".

=== Awards and nominations ===
Per Gessle was nominated as Son of a Plumber in the "Male Pop Artist of the Year" category at the 2006 Grammis, the Swedish equivalent of the Grammy Awards. The award was eventually won by Håkan Hellström.

== Commercial performance ==
The album was a commercial success in Sweden, spending two weeks at number one and a total of 28 weeks on the Swedish Albums Chart. It was the third best-selling album of 2005 in the country, and was also one of the best-selling albums of 2006. The record was certified platinum by the Swedish Recording Industry Association at the end of 2005 for shipments in excess of 60,000 units. In late 2005, it was announced that Gessle's label Elevator Entertainment was Sweden's third most successful company in terms of profit margin.

== Track listing ==
All tracks are written by Per Gessle.

Son of a Plumber – LP#1
No.	Title	Length
1.	"Drowning in Wonderful Thoughts About Her"	2:46
2.	"Jo-Anna Says"	3:23
3.	"I Have a Party in My Head (I Hope It Never Ends)"	2:06
4.	"C'mon"	2:58
5.	"Week with Four Thursdays" (Instrumental)	2:10
6.	"Hey Mr. DJ (Won't You Play Another Love Song)"	3:43
7.	"Late, Later On"	3:53
8.	"Ronnie Lane" (Instrumental)	1:04

Son of a Plumber – LP#1 (The Junior Suite) (Note: Tracks nine to thirteen of LP#1 are mixed together as a medley, listed on CD and vinyl editions as "The Junior Suite".)
No.	Title	Length
9.	"Are You an Old Hippie, Sir?"	1:42
10.	"Double-Headed Elvis"	1:22
11.	"Something in the System"	1:31
12.	"Speed Boat to Cuba"	1:47
13.	"Come Back Tomorrow (And We Do It Again)"	2:08
Total length:		30:33

Son of a Plumber – LP#2
No.	Title	Length
1.	"Kurt - The Fastest Plumber in the West" (Instrumental)	1:37
2.	"I Never Quite Got over the Fact That the Beatles Broke Up"	4:09
3.	"Substitute (For the Real Deal)"	3:08
4.	"Waltz for Woody" (Instrumental)	1:03
5.	"Carousel"	2:28
6.	"I Like It Like That"	3:34
7.	"Something Happened Today"	2:46
8.	"Brilliant Career"	2:29
9.	"Burned Out Heart"	3:42
10.	"Drowning in Wonderful Thoughts About Her" (Reprise)	0:57
11.	"Making Love or Expecting Rain"	4:59
12.	"Jo-Anna Says Farewell" (hidden track)	10:47 (Note: The first ten minutes of "Jo-Anna Says Farewell" consists of silence, followed by a 47-second instrumental reprise of "Jo-Anna Says". The vinyl edition does not include the ten minutes of silence.)
Total length:		41:39

Son of a Plumber – LP#2 (iTunes bonus tracks)
No.	Title	Length
13.	"Keep the Radio On (This Is the Perfect Song)"	2:58
14.	"A Girl Like You"	2:59
15.	"Plonk" (Alternate version of "Ronnie Lane")	1:08
Total length:		48:44

- Vinyl editions include "Keep the Radio On (This Is the Perfect Song)" as a bonus track, appearing on LP#2 between "I Like It Like That" and "Something Happened Today".

Son of a Plumber – Disc 3 (2021 digital reissue)
No.	Title	Length
1.	"A Girl Like You"	2:58
2.	"Keep the Radio On (This Is the Perfect Song)"	2:56
3.	"Shopping with Mother"	2:41
4.	"Plonk" (Alternate version of "Ronnie Lane")	1:07
5.	"Hey Mr. DJ (Won't You Play Another Love Song)" (Love-For-Sale Remix)	3:55
6.	"I Never Quite Got over the Fact That the Beatles Broke Up" (Jimmy Monell Short Treatment)	4:10
7.	"Shopping with Mother" (Voz Vibrante Remix)	3:54
8.	"Hey Mr. DJ (Won't You Play Another Love Song)" (Jimmy Monell Treatment)	3:43
9.	"I Never Quite Got over the Fact That the Beatles Broke Up" (Jimmy Monell Long Treatment)	5:41
10.	"Shopping with Mother" (Mother's Dub by Voz Vibrante)	3:54
11.	"Plumber in Progress #1" ("Substitute (For the Real Deal)")	0:45
12.	"Plumber in Progress #2" ("Hey Mr. DJ (Won't You Play Another Love Song)")	0:45
13.	"Plumber in Progress #3" ("C'mon")	0:45
14.	"Plumber in Progress #4" ("Kurt - The Fastest Plumber in the West")	0:45
15.	"Plumber in Progress #5" ("I Have a Party in My Head (I Hope It Never Ends)")	0:45
16.	"Plumber in Progress #6" ("Burned Out Heart")	0:45
17.	"Plumber in Progress #7" ("Double-Headed Elvis")	0:39
18.	"Plumber in Progress #8" ("Are You an Old Hippie, Sir?")	0:44
19.	"Plumber in Progress #9" ("Late, Later On")	0:45
20.	"Plumber in Progress #10" ("Making Love or Expecting Rain")	0:45
21.	"Plumber in Progress #11" ("Brilliant Career")	0:34
22.	"Plumber in Progress #12" ("Speed Boat to Cuba")	0:41
23.	"Plumber in Progress #13" ("Something Happened Today")	0:45
24.	"Plumber in Progress #14" ("Carousel")	0:40
25.	"Plumber in Progress #15" ("Come Back Tomorrow (And We Do It Again)")	0:31
Total length:		45:33

== Credits and personnel ==
Credits adapted from the CD and vinyl liner notes.

- Recorded at Aerosol Grey Machine, Vallarum, Sweden between November 2004 and August 2005.
- Mixed at Aerosol Grey Machine between August and October 2005.
- CD version mastered by Bjorn Engelmann at Cutting Room, Stockholm.
- Vinyl version mastered by Janne Hansson at Atlantis Studio, Stockholm.

Musicians

- Per Gessle – vocals, composition, instrumentation, production, mixing, artwork and illustrations
- Jens Jansson – drums
- Helena Josefsson – vocals
- Christoffer Lundquist – backing vocals, instrumentation, string and horn arrangements, engineering, production and mixing
- Clarence Öfwerman – backing vocals, instrumentation, string and horn arrangements, production and mixing
- The Chico Chihuahua Vocal Ensemble – backing vocals
- The Funky Färs Härads Chamber Orchestra – strings and horns

Additional personnel

- Kjell Andersson – cover artwork
- Anton Corbijn – photography
- Lennart Haglund – engineering assistant
- U.N. Owen – photography
- Pär Wickholm – cover artwork

== Charts ==
=== Weekly charts ===
Chart (2005)	Peak; position
Swedish Albums (Sverigetopplistan)	1

=== Year-end charts ===
Chart (2005)	Position
Swedish Albums (Sverigetopplistan)	3
Chart (2006)	Position
Swedish Albums (Sverigetopplistan)	75

== Certifications ==
Region	Certification	Certified units/sales
Sweden (GLF)	Platinum	60,000^{^}
^{^} Shipments figures based on certification alone.
