= Dea Norberg =

Swedish singer and choirgirl (born 1974)

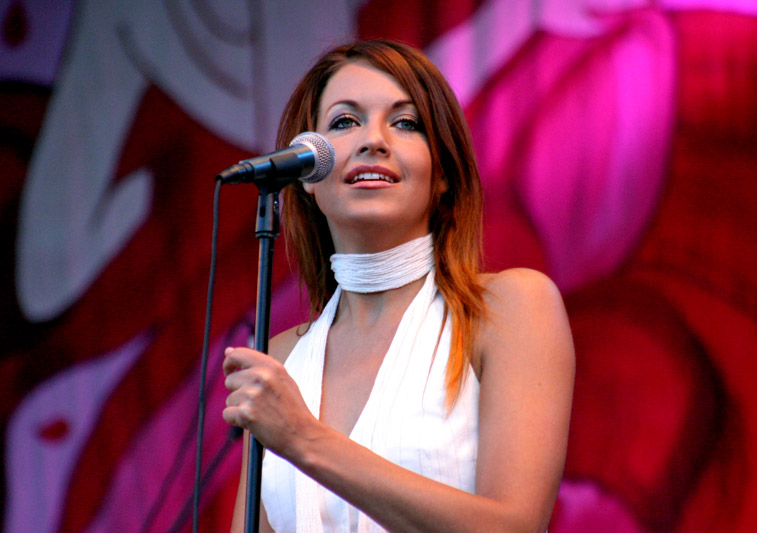
- Dea Norberg during a concert

Background information
- Born: Andrea Heléna Norberg; 3 March 1974 (age 52)
- Origin: Bräkne-Hoby, Sweden
- Genres: Pop, Soul, R&B, Rock
- Occupation: Singer
- Instrument: Vocals
- Years active: 1999–present

Andrea Heléne "Dea" Norberg (born 3 March 1974 in Bräkne-Hoby, Sweden) is a Swedish singer and choirgirl who sang in most of Sweden's Eurovision Song Contest entries during the 2000s.

Norberg has been involved in the Melodifestivalen house-choir between 2003 and 2006 and 2009, and the choir for Sweden in Eurovision in 1999, 2003, 2004, 2005, 2006, 2008, 2009, 2013, 2014. However Norberg saw 2009 as her last year in Melodifestivalen as she moved to Las Vegas, Nevada, United States to do shows there.

Aside from her participations in the Eurovision Song Contest as a backing vocalist for Sweden, Norberg has also provided backing for Malta in 2000, Australia and Azerbaijan in 2016, Austria in 2024 and Switzerland in 2026.

As from January 2012, Dea joined the band of Roxette as a backing vocalist on various Australian, Asian, European and North- and South American legs of their 2011–2012, 2014–2016 & 2025 world tours.

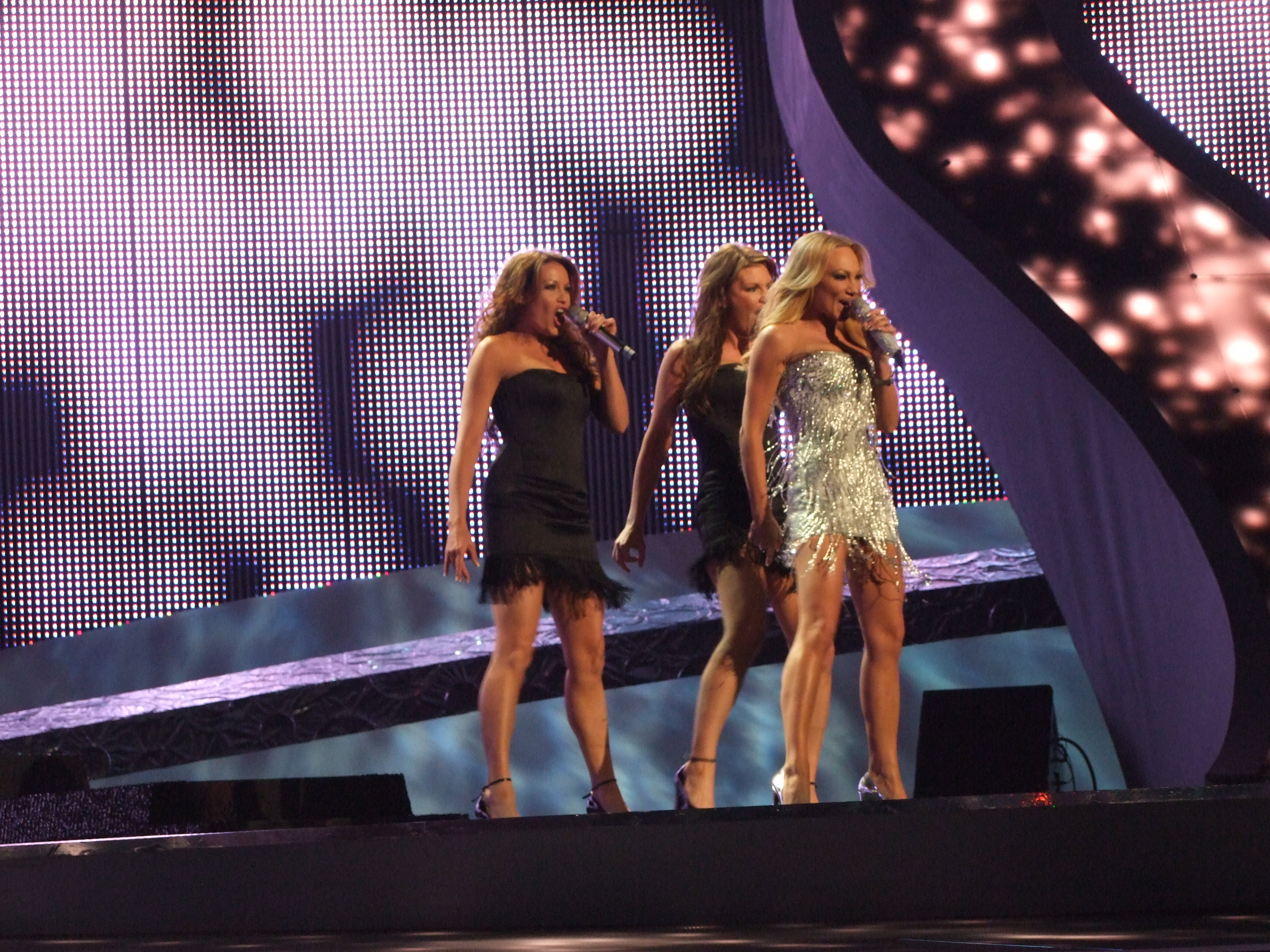
Dea Norberg (left) behind Charlotte Perrelli in the Eurovision Song Contest 2008

Dea is one of the vocalists in the Viva Elvis Live Band and sings "Love Me Tender" with Elvis in the show and on the 2010 album "Viva Elvis, The Album".

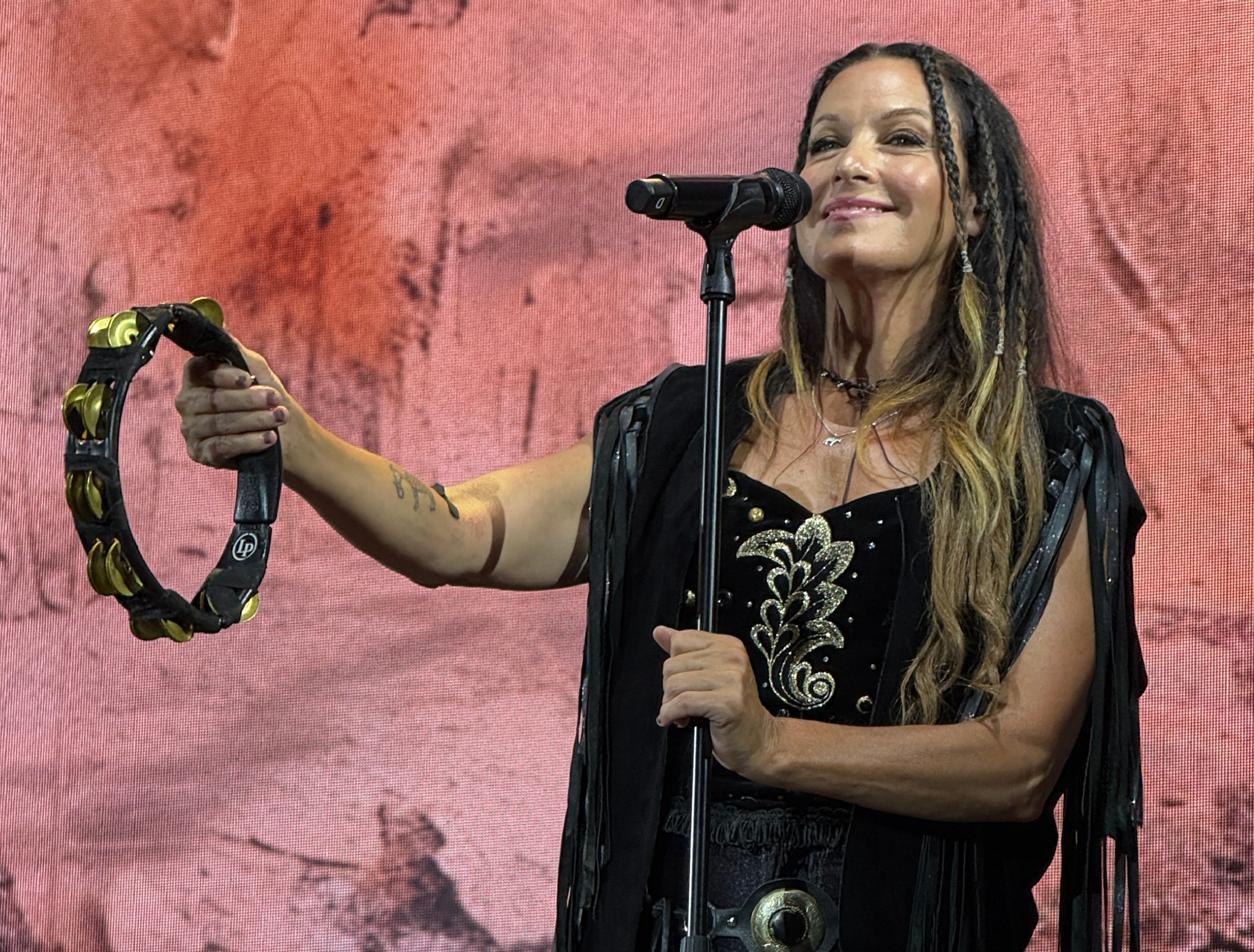
Norberg live in Halmstad, Sweden, in July 2025
