= Ola Magnell =

Swedish musician (1946–2020)

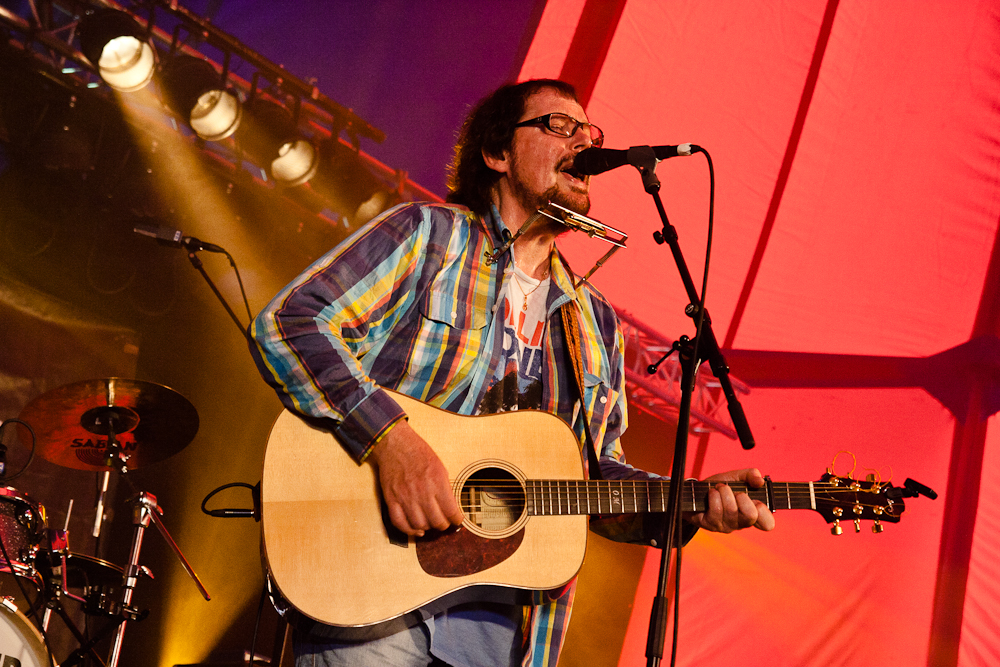
- Ola Magnell during Trästockfestivalen in Skellefteå, Sweden in July 2011

Background information
- Born: 20 January 1946; Skälby gård, Sweden
- Died: 6 February 2020 (aged 74) Tunby, Sweden
- Occupations: singer, songwriter, producer
- Instruments: guitar, harmonica
- Years active: 1972–2020
- Label: Metronome

Nils Olaus Lennart Karl Magnell (20 January 1946 – 6 February 2020) was a Swedish pop-rock singer and guitarist. His works were first put out by Metronome Records in the 1970s.
