= Helena Josefsson =

Swedish singer and songwriter (born 1978)

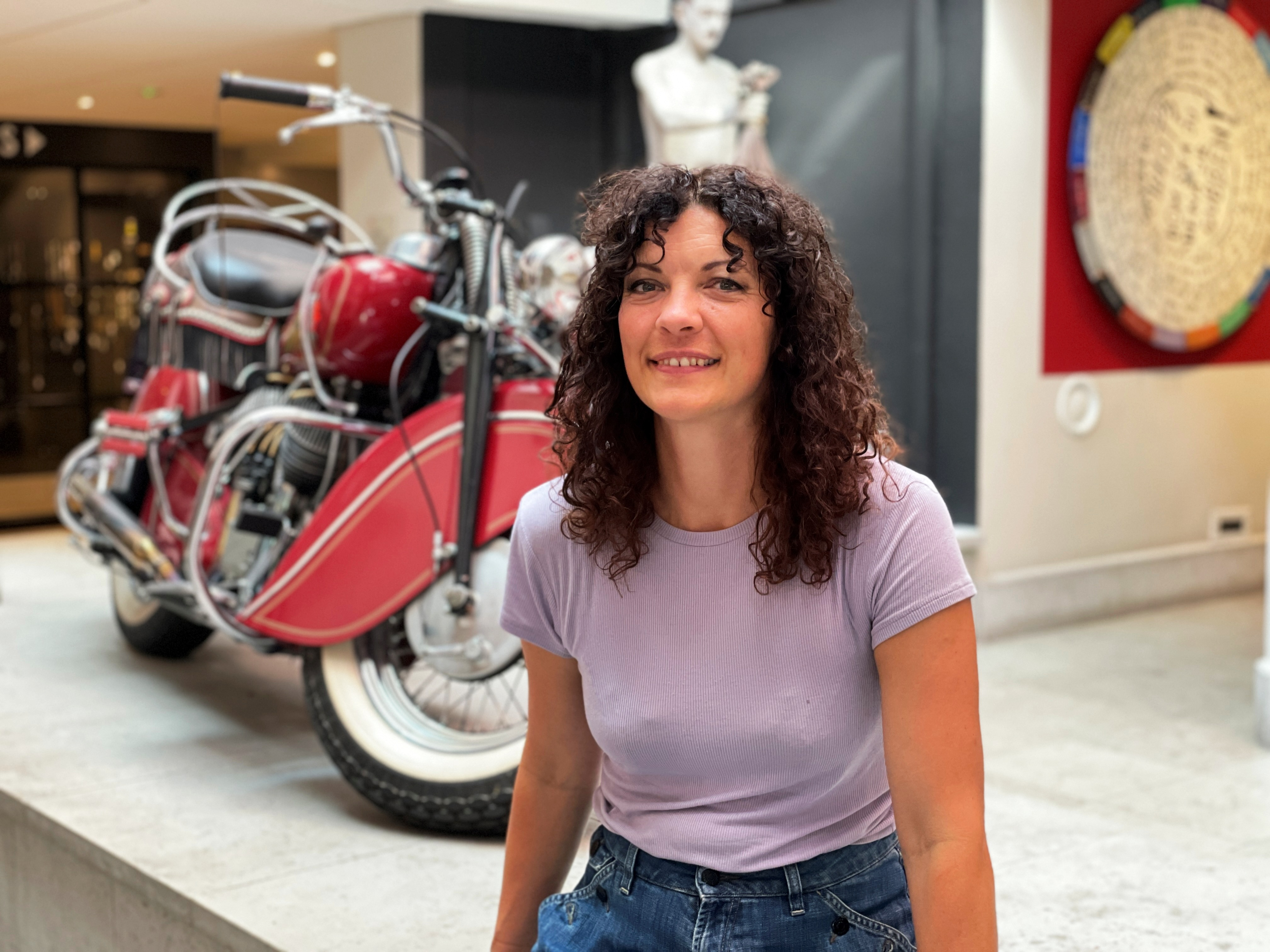
- Josefsson on 14 July 2021

Background information
- Born: Helena Marianne Josefsson; 23 March 1978 (age 48)
- Origin: Kalmar, Sweden
- Genres: Pop, indie-pop
- Occupations: singer; songwriter
- Instrument: Vocals
- Years active: 1999–present
- Labels: EMI, Elevator Entertainment
- Website: Official Website (from archive)

Helena Marianne Josefsson (born 23 March 1978) is a Swedish singer and songwriter. She is the lead vocalist in the band Sandy Mouche and has collaborated with Per Gessle, Roxette, Arash Labaf, The Ark and various other Swedish musical projects as a backing vocalist. Josefsson toured with Roxette during 2011 on their Neverending World Tour and also toured with Gessle, most notably during his 2018 Per Gessle's Roxette tour around Europe, where she was lead singer in a number of songs. In 2015 she recorded a jazz-covers album Happiness with Swedish trio Kontur, as well as cooperating with Roxette's bass guitarist Magnus Börjesson in a "jazz electronique" project. In addition to Happiness she has released three other solo albums, Dynamo (2007), Kyss Mej (Kiss me 2011) and Beauty Love Anything (2019).

== Early life and Sandy Mouche ==
Helena Marianne Josefsson was born in Kalmar, Sweden on 23 March 1978. Her parents, Per Olof Josefsson (born 1947 in Virserum, Kalmar County) and Margareta (née Danielsson) (born 12 February 1952 in Landskrona), divorced when Helena was seven years old, and she and her sisters moved with their mother to a village called Björnstorp (outside of Lund, Skåne County, southern Sweden) when she was ten. Helena has four sisters (Charlotta, Sofia, Hanna (born on 2 April 1988) and Carolina).

Josefsson began to play in some groups of Lund and Malmö at High School. Her first band was Plastic Soul (firstly called "Jive with Clive"), with Josefsson, Johan Duncanson (guitar), Fredrick Whitling (lead-guitar and keyboards), Olof Martinsson (bass) and Per Blomgren (drums). Between 1996 and 2000, they took part in club gigs and indie Summer festivals and released some singles, "Uneasy" and "Take a dive". Johan and Per began a new successful project, The Radio Dept. Josefsson also took part in two non-long-lasting projects. In 1999, she played and recorded two promo E.P.'s with Magnus Tingsek and their band ewing.1. Between 2000 and 2001, she was the lead singer of Dan Bornemark's rock band, The Good Mornings, recording an album (The Good Mornings, 2000).

In the fall of 2001, during a holiday trip to the Greek island of Crete, Josefsson and her boyfriend Martinique Josefsson started the band Sandy Mouche with their friends, the Blomgren brothers, Per (drums) and Ola (guitar) and Danyal Taylan (bass until 2004). They toured Japan, France and Poland, and went on to release three albums, White Lucky Dragon (2004), ... and poems for the unborn (2006) and Glory and grace (2013). The song, "Spiderweb suit", written by Josefsson, features in the film New York Waiting (directed by Joachim Hedén, 2006). Sandy Mouche played together in a gig in Malmö in 2010.

== Backing vocals ==
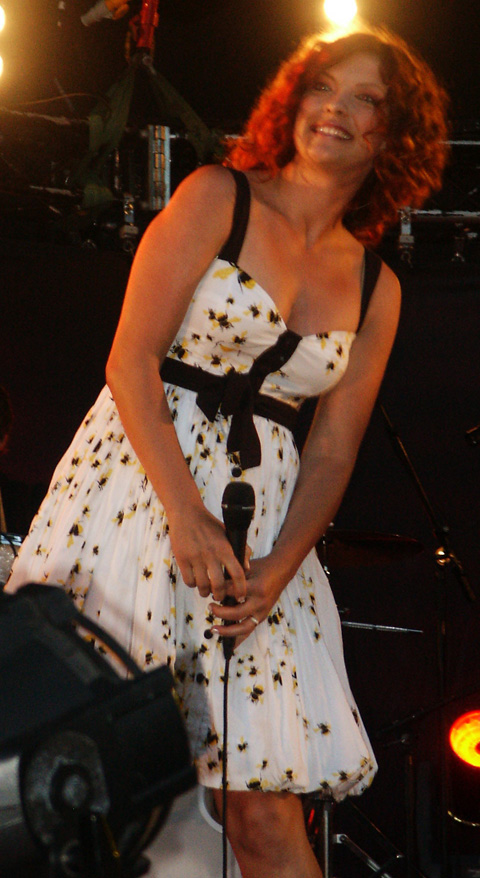
Josefsson at Per Gessle's live concert in Helsingborg, Sweden on July 19, 2007

Josefsson started as a backing vocalist for The Ark, singing on their We Are the Ark (2000) and In Lust We Trust (2002) albums. In early 2003, Josefsson started collaborating with Per Gessle as a backing singer for his successful solo album Mazarin, which topped the charts in Sweden. Christoffer Lundquist, Gessle's producer was looking for a female singer and picked Josefsson. She first came to the attention of Lundquist after she and Sandy Mouche wanted to record at his Aerosol Grey Machine (AGM) studio. "I remember driving a car between Lund and Lomma when Christoffer called and wondered if I was interested in starting singing with Per who wanted a girl for his solo projects.", recalled Josefsson.

She went on the Mazarin Sommarturne (Summer tour) in 2003 with Gessle and his solo band: Clarence Öfwerman (keyboards), Christoffer Lundquist (bass), Jonas Isaakson (guitar), Jens Jansson (drums). She then was involved with Gessle's band Gyllene Tider for their album Finn 5 fel! (2004) and then sung in Swedish and English for Gessle's solo albums, Son of a Plumber (2005), En händig man (2007) and Party Crasher (2008). Her voice became more prominent in Party Crasher, significantly contributing to the songs, "Hey, I Died and Went to Heaven" and "Perfect Excuse". She toured Sweden again with Gessle for the En händig man Sommarturne (2007), and around Europe for The Party Crasher Tour (2009), and then went on a world tour with Roxette in 2011.

She has also featured in a number of songs for Iranian singer Arash Labaf. The video for their 2010 collaboration, Broken Angel, has over 200 million views on YouTube. Their more recent releases include "One Night in Dubai" (2019) and "Angel's Lullaby" (2021).

Josefsson has also done backing vocals for other artists including, Righteous Boy, Swan Lee, Junior Senior, Andreas Johnson, Sebastian Karlsson, and Pelle Ossler.

== Solo albums and other projects ==
"What do you want to become when you grow up? Either a troll or an artist!, I replied to that question at 7 years of age. When I think about it, trolls and artists do have rather much in common. What I wanted, and still try to achieve, is the sense of liberty, being part of nature, getting room in the city, finding a spot for mushrooming. That it is all right to be the way one is and still being able to receive love. Being an artist and composer is probably one of the few lifestyles where one can be a troll simultaneously!"

In 2007 Josefsson released her first solo album, Dynamo. The album was produced by Lundquist at his AGM studio and was published by EMI and Gessle's own company, Elevator Entertainment. The album spent two weeks on the Swedish Charts reaching No. 23 as the highest position. Josefsson toured with her own band in 2007 to promote Dynamo in Sweden and Germany.

Her second album, Kyss Mej (Kiss me), followed in 2011. It was her first in Swedish but it received mixed reviews from the press. In the same year, she took part in a tribute project to the American country music singer Dolly Parton. Josefsson along with other Swedish female singers, Nina Persson (the Cardigans), Cecilia Nordlund (aka Cilihili), Lotta Wenglén and Gudrún Hauksdóttir, performed a live concert and recorded a documentary film Jag är min egen Dolly Parton (I am My Own Dolly Parton, dir. Jessica Nettelbladt). An English version of the documentary was also released.

In 2013 Josefsson sang together with the Vindla String Quartet, performing in French, notably "Hymne à l'amour" by Edith Piaf. and "Ne Me Quitte Pas" by Jacques Brel. "Ne Me Quitte Pas" was filmed by Sveriges Berlin, a Malmö based video magazine that followed local culture.

In late 2015 she released Happiness, a jazz-covers album with Swedish trio Kontur, and toured Sweden with them. Peter Eliasson of Skånska Dagbladet reviewed the tour premiere in Malmö, scoring the concert 3 out of 5. She released Beauty love anything in 2019.

== Personal life ==
Josefsson married Martinique Josefsson, her longtime boyfriend, in 2003; they live in Malmö and became the parents of a boy, Charles Didrik, on 8 November 2008. On 31 May 2012 her second child, a boy named Cornelis was born. In 2015 Helena graduated from the University of Copenhagen with an optometrist diploma. In between touring and recording sessions she works in one of the optic stores in Landskrona (near Malmö, south Sweden).

== Discography ==
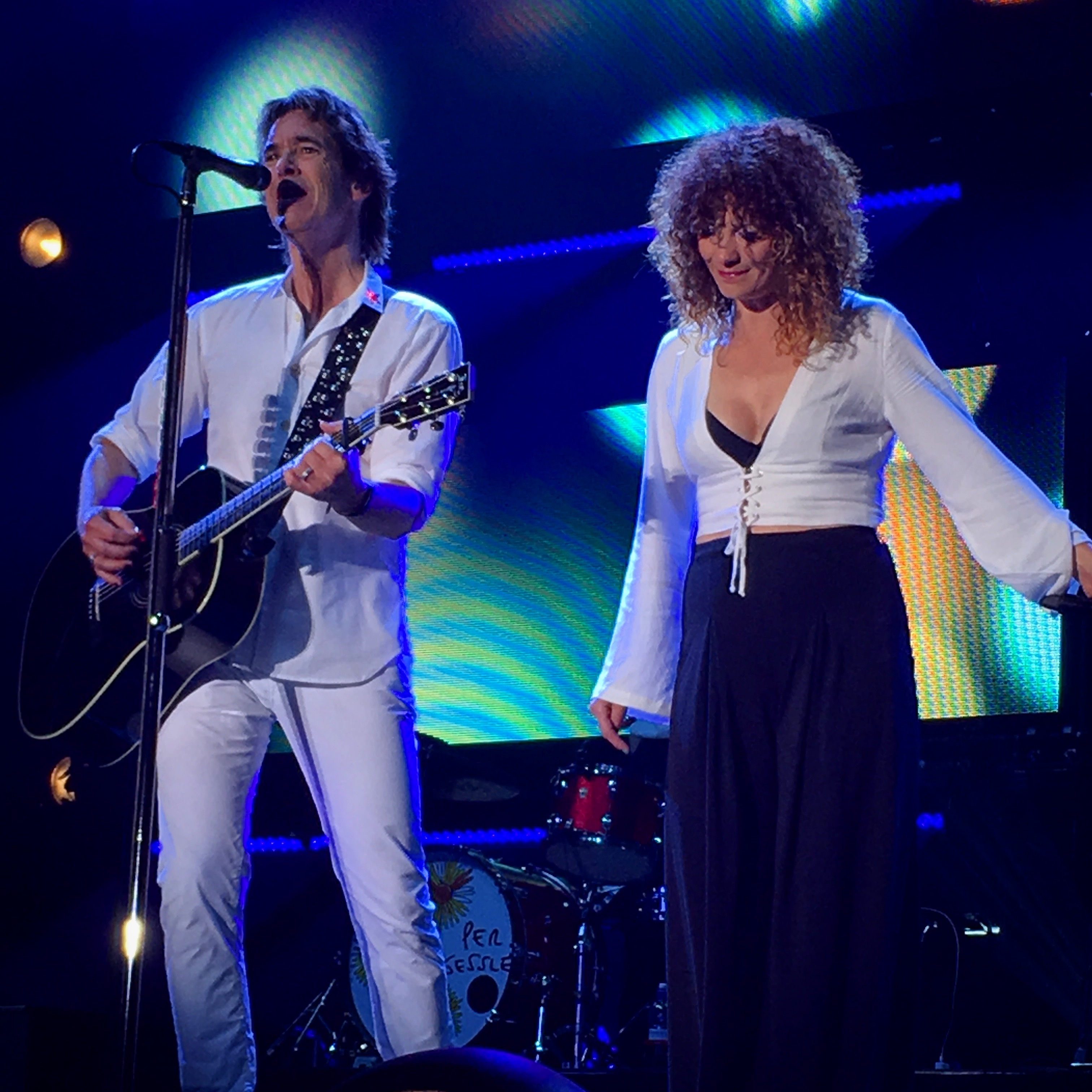
Josefsson with Per Gessle during his En vacker kvall Scandinavian tour in Grebbestad, Sweden on 21 July 2017

=== Solo albums ===
- Dynamo (2007)
- Kyss Mej (2011)
- Happiness feat. Kontur (2015)
- Beauty Love Anything (2019)

=== Singles ===
==== As featured artist ====
- Air Bureau: "Had it With You" (2006).
- Andreas Johnson: Mr. Johnson, your room is on fire (2005), The Collector (2007).
- The Ark: We Are the Ark (2000), In Lust We Trust (2002).
- Arash: "Arash" (2005), "Pure Love" (2008), "Broken Angel" (2010), "One Day" (2014), "Dooset Daram" (2018), "One Night in Dubai" (2019), "Angel's Lullaby" (2021).
- District 1269: "Summertown" (2006).
- Doug Wyatt: The Dream of I (2006).
- Fredo: Smack (2005), Remack (2006).
- Hideki Kaji: "This is Still OK" (2000, single), You will love me (2001).
- Gyllene Tider: Finn 5 fel! (2004).
- The Margarets: Love Will Haunt You Down (2005).
- Metro Jets: "Jingle Jangle Christmas" (2006).
- Pelle Ossler: Den siste som kom ut (2002).
- Per Gessle: Mazarin (2003), Son of a Plumber (2005), En Händig Man (2007), Party Crasher (2008), En vacker natt (2017), En vacker dag (2017), Small Town Talk (2018), Mind Control (Mono Mind, 2019), Sällskapssjuk (2024).
- Junior Senior: "Rhythm Bandits" (2003, single), D-D-Don't Don't Stop the Beat (2003).
- Justin Winokur: Thirteen Songs About Love (2004).
- Righteous Boy: I Sing Because Of You (2003).
- Roxette: Travelling (2012), Good Karma (2016)
- PG Roxette: Pop-Up Dynamo! (2022)
- Sebastian Karlsson: "Words and Violence" (2006), The Vintage Virgin (2007).
- stockfinster: Red wood (2004), Sunset (2005), All Becomes Music (2005), Car crash (2009), Dead line (2009).
- Swan Lee: Swan Lee (2004), The Complete Collection (2007).
