= Listapad =

Minsk International Film Festival, Belarus

Minsk International Film Festival Listapad
- Location: Minsk, Belarus
- Language: International
- Website: www.listapad.com

Listapad (Belarusian: Лістапад, meaning "November"), also known as Minsk International Film Festival (MIFF) or Minsk International Film Festival Listapad, is an annual film festival which takes place in November in Minsk, Belarus. It is the largest such festival in Belarus.

== History ==
=== 1994-2009 ===
The inaugural festival was held in 1994, at a time when Belarus had just gained independence and had fallen out of the world and post-Soviet film industry.

The idea to create the festival belongs to Serhey Artimovich, at the time the director of Tele-ARS studio. Listapad aimed to unite the best films of post-Soviet states and bring them to the screens in Minsk. In its first year, the festival was called Post-Soviet Film Festival Listapad, though films by Russian directors prevailed in the line-up. Later works of Ukrainian, Kazakh and Azerbaijani directors joined the program. Rostislav Yankovsky became the chairman of the festival in 1994. In 1996 the Audience Award was chosen as the main award of the festival; before that it was equal to the awards from filmmakers and journalists.

Between 1996 and 2008 Valentina Stepanova was directing the festival. During this period, representatives of 45 countries have joined the Festival as directors, producers, jury and press. New nominations were introduced and special prizes from media and guilds were established as well as prizes for Best Actress and Best Actor.

The Children and Youth Films Competition "Listapadzik" became the main novelty of the festival in 2008.

In 2003, Listapad officially became an International Film Festival. That year, films from Poland, Russia, Serbia, Bulgaria, Czech Republic, US, Iran, China and Japan were screened at the Festival.

In 2007, Listapad's director Valentina Stepanova and film critic and editor Irina Demyanova organized the first Documentary Films Competition. Since then Irina Demyanova holds the position of Documentary Film program director of the Festival.

The Children and Youth Films Competition "Listapadzik" became the main novelty of the festival in 2008.

In 2009, Listapad was accredited by the International Federation of Film Producers Associations (FIAPF) as a competitive film festival specialized on films from Baltic countries, as well as countries of Central Asia, Central and Eastern Europe. That year became the first when the tickets were sold for the opening and closing ceremonies.

=== 2010-present ===
2010, when Anzhela Krashevskaya became the director of the Festival and Igor Sukmanov headed the Feature Film section, was the year of renovation of the Festival. In its new format, the Festival included Main Feature Film Competition (at least 12 films participating), Feature Films Competition "Youth on the March" (9 film debuts from the directors from all around the globe), Main Documentary Film Competition (20 films participating) and National Schools Documentary Competition (for works of young directors, representing the particular film school) (12 films). Since 2010, the winners have been selected by an official jury.

In its most successful years, Listapad's line-up included up to 300 feature films an reached the attendance of 40,000. Since 2017, the festival has also presented the FIPRESCI prize.

In 2019, Listapad's program included 150 films from 50 countries.

In 2020, the festival was canceled by the authorities one day before its start. For next year's edition, Vladimir Karachevsky, General Director of the Belarusfilm film studio, was appointed Listapad's director. The authorities liquidated the ART Corporation centre and entrusted the festival's management to Belarusfilm state studio. As noted by the new director, after 2020 the festival spirit changed greatly and its program shifted from mainly auteur cinema to films that are in line with state ideology.

In 2022, the number of submissions reached 1360.

== Description ==
MIFF Listapad is Belarus' largest film festival, it is managed by a non-governmental institution ART Corporation center of visual and performing arts. Listapad takes place over a week in November and comprises three main sections: feature films, documentaries, and the children and youth film festival, Listapadzik. The festival also includes an out-of-competition program and the CIS Golden Collection screenings. In 2022, the animation competition program was inaugurated.

The top prize of the Festival is called "Golden Listapad", followed by "Silver Listapad" and "Listapad Bronze Audience Award". International Jury and International Film Critics Jury award them to the competing works.

The festival also provides an educational platform for communication between cinema professionals. Varied workshops, discussions and exhibitions are held to provide an opportunity to learn from masters of cinema and to discuss challenges related to the development of cinematography.

Special guests of the festival have included Fanny Ardant, Alyona Babenko, Juozas Budraitis, Lyudmila Gurchenko, Krzysztof Zanussi, Claire Denis, Andrey Zvyagintsev, Emir Kusturica, Sergei Loznitsa, Brillante Mendoza, Kira Muratova, Ornella Muti and Alexander Sokurov.

== Competition ==
As of 2019, the festival included following competitions:

- Main Feature Film Competition;
- Feature Film Competition "Youth on March";
- National Competition (for feature films, documentaries and animation);
- Main Documentary Film Competition;
- 1st-2nd Documentary Film Competition – National Film School Competition;
- Children and Youth Films Competition "Listapadzik".

Films should be no older than two years to be allowed to participate in the Competition. No fewer than 12 films that have never been screened in Belarus and produced in the Post-Soviet states and former Eastern Bloc countries participate in the Main Feature Films Competition.

"Youth on the March" Competition supports young directors. No less than 8 films produced by young professionals participate in the Competition. Participating films can be either debut or second work in the director's filmography.

Representatives of no less than 6 film schools from all over the world (each one of them presents 3-4 most outstanding student works including diploma works) participate in 1st - 2nd Documentary Films Competition –National Film Schools Competition.

Full-length feature films and animation films that have been specially mentioned and highly acclaimed at international festivals participate in the Children and Youth Films Competition "Listapadzik".

National Competition was introduced in 2014. Fiction, documentary and animated full-length and short films created by Belarusian authors in Belarus and abroad during the last two years can participate in the National Competition. International Jury will judge this Competition.

Traditional format of the Festival includes not only viewers' voting, but also discussions between authors and viewers. In 2013 Claire Denis (retrospective), Kira Muratova (Eternal Homecoming), Brillante Mendoza ("Captive" and "Thy Womb") and Alexander Veledinsky ("The Geographer Drank His Globe Away") have presented and discussed their works in Minsk.

== Jury ==
To judge the films in the Competition Programmes six juries are set up: International Jury of the Main Feature Films Competition (5 members), International Jury of the Feature Films Competition "Youth on the March" (3), International Jury of the National Competition (3), International Jury of the Main Documentary Films Competition (5), International Jury of the 1st - 2nd Documentary Films Competition – National Film Schools Competition (3).

International Film Critics Jury (7 members) judge all the feature and documentary films competitions of the Festival.

International Jury of 3 people judges Children and Youth Films Competition "Listapadzik".

== Awards ==
=== Feature Film Competition ===
Prizes for Main Feature Film Competition:

- The Grand-Prix "Golden Listapad" for best film;
- Award for Best Director;
- Yury Marukhin Memorial Award for Best Cinematography;
- Special Jury Award (awarded in accordance with the Jury's decision)

The International Jury of Feature Films Competition "Youth on the March" gives "Victor Turov Memorial Award for Best Film in "Youth on the March" Feature Films Competition".

=== Documentary Film Competition ===
The International Jury of the Main Documentary Films Competition gives the following awards:

- Grand-Prix for Best Documentary Film;
- Special Jury Award (awarded in accordance with the Jury's decision).

The International Jury of the 1st -2nd Documentary Films Competition gives the "Award for Best 1st - 2nd Documentary Film".

=== The Children and Youth Films Competition "Listapadzik" ===
The International Jury of Children and Youth Films Competition "Listapadzik" gives the following awards:

- Award for Best Film for Children;
- Award for Best Film for Youth;
- Award for Best Young Actor or Actress;
- Award for Best Adult Actor in Children's film.

The Main award of the Competition "Golden Listapadzik" is given after the results of audience vote.

==== The International Film Critics Jury gives the following awards ====
- Listapad Silver Award for Art as Phenomenon;
- Award for Best Actress in a Leading Role;
- Award for Best Actor in a Leading Role;
- Award for Best Actress in a Supporting Role;
- Award for Best Actor in a Supporting Role.

All judges have a right to award special prizes for the main film professions.

Listapad Bronze Audience Award for best feature film is given according to the results of preference vote. The audience can vote for all the feature film programs (except Retrospective Screenings).

The Prize "For Humanism and Spirituality in the Cinema" is awarded to the author of a competition film on spiritual, humanistic and moral questions. The award was instituted by Alexander Lukashenko. In 2013 Lithuanian actor Juozas Budraitis won this prize.

== Winners of the Gold Listapad ==
- 1999 — Voroshilov Sharpshooter by Stanislav Govorukhin;
- 2000 — The Captain's Daughter by Aleksandr Proshkin;
- 2001 — Come Look at Me by Oleg Yankovsky and Mikhail Agranovich;
- 2002 — The Cuckoo by Aleksandr Rogozhkin;
- 2003 — The Return by Andrey Zvyagintsev;
- 2004 — A Driver for Vera by Pavel Chukhraj;
- 2005 — Not by Bread Alone by Stanislav Govorukhin;
- 2006 — It Doesn't Hurt Me by Aleksey Balabanov;
- 2007 — The Lives of Others by Florian Henckel von Donnersmarck;
- 2008 — The Passenger by Stanislav Govorukhin;
- 2009 — The World is Big and Salvation Lurks around the Corner by Stefan Komandarev;
- 2010 — My Joy by Sergei Loznitsa;
- 2011 — The Hunter by Bakur Bakuradze;
- 2012 — In the Fog by Sergei Loznitsa;
- 2013 — Ida by Paweł Pawlikowski;
- 2014 — The Tribe by Myroslav Slaboshpytskiy;
- 2015 — The Lesson by Kristina Grozeva and Petar Valchanov;
- 2016 — Liliom ösvény by Benedek Fliegauf;
- 2017 — November by Rainer Sarnet;
- 2018 — I Do Not Care If We Go Down in History as Barbarians by Radu Jude;
- 2019 — Atlantis by Valentyn Vasyanovych;
- 2021 — Ilhaq by Jahongir Ahmedov;
- 2022 — Intensive Care by Pyotr Todorovsky Jr.;
- 2023 — Brooklyn Tailor by Eugene Serov.
