= Anthem (video game) =

Defunct 2019 video game

- Developer: BioWare
- Publisher: Electronic Arts
- Director: Jon Warner
- Producers: Mike Gamble; Ben Irving; Leonard C. Quam
- Designer: Preston Watamaniuk
- Programmer: Scott Neumann
- Artist: Derek Watts
- Writers: Drew Karpyshyn; Jay Watamaniuk; Cathleen Rootsaert
- Composer: Sarah Schachner
- Engine: Frostbite 3
- Platforms: PlayStation 4; Windows; Xbox One
- Release: February 22, 2019
- Genre: Action role-playing
- Mode: Multiplayer

Anthem was an online multiplayer action role-playing video game developed by BioWare and published by Electronic Arts. The game was released worldwide for PlayStation 4, Windows, and Xbox One on February 22, 2019.

Set on a fictional planet named Coda, players assumed the role of Freelancers, heroic adventurers who wear powerful exosuits to defend humanity from the threats beyond their cities' walls. The game's title refers to the Anthem of Creation, a powerful and mysterious force responsible for most of the extraordinary technology, phenomena, and threats in the world. In the main narrative, the player's Freelancer is tasked with stopping the villainous Monitor from seizing control of the Anthem.

Anthem received mixed reviews from critics, who criticized it for its grind and shallow gameplay, technical aspects, and story, although its combat, flight controls, and visuals received some praise. Despite some positive sales achievements, reaching over 5 million lifetime sales, the game failed to meet commercial expectations. Although BioWare announced in February 2020 that they would be reinventing the core gameplay of Anthem as part of a long-term plan, all future development ceased in February 2021. Anthem′s servers shut down on January 12, 2026, rendering the game unplayable.

== Gameplay ==
Anthem combined third-person shooter and action role-playing game elements in a "contiguous open world" shared with up to three other players. Each player took the role of a Freelancer donning fully customizable exosuits called Javelins.

Anthem featured four unique Javelin variants which the player unlocked while progressing through the game. Each Javelin featured unique attributes and abilities that encouraged different styles of play and evoked classic role-playing game character archetypes. The Ranger was the Javelin players began the game with, and was considered the "all-around master of combat"; the Colossus was the largest and slowest, but the most resilient and featured a large shield to absorb attacks or hit enemies; the Interceptor was the fastest and most agile, specializing in quick close-quarters melee strikes; the Storm was the least armored, but could remain airborne the longest, allowing it to attack from a distance with blasts of elemental energies.

Players could build relationships with various non-playable characters, but they could not establish romantic relationships with them, as was common in previous BioWare games. The central meeting point of the game took place in Fort Tarsis, which serves as a fortified settlement against the threats of the outside world, and was the point where the player went to receive new missions and freelance assignments. Fort Tarsis is a melting pot where all the different factions of the game meet, including the Sentinels, Corvus, Cyphers, and Arcanists.

The game featured both single-player and co-operative multiplayer elements in a "shared world" that could have up to four squad members per team. Teams could fight beasts and marauders while exploring lost ruins and experiencing massive, world-altering occurrences, such as "Shaper Storms".

== Synopsis ==
=== Setting ===
Anthem was set on the planet Coda, which is littered with advanced technological relics which harness an omnipresent energy known as the Anthem of Creation. Unstable relics can spontaneously terraform sections of the planet, mutate wildlife, change the local climate, create portals, and spawn monstrous creatures. Extremely unstable artifacts can envelope a significant area with destructive energies, storms, and creatures, rendering them barren and deadly. Such events are known as Cataclysms. Human knowledge about the relics is limited, but its believed they were created by a godlike race called the Shapers, who abandoned the planet millennia ago for unknown reasons. The Anthem and the Shapers are revered by some as the source of all life.

Centuries before the start of the game, humanity was enslaved by a race of creatures called the Urgoth. A human named Helena Tarsis and her compatriots used Shaper technology to invent powerful exosuits to fight back. These exosuits became known as Javelins, and Tarsis sacrificed herself to overthrow the Urgoth, who have not been seen since. Over the centuries, Tarsis and her Legion of Dawn became heroic legends to humanity, which reestablished itself as a dominant race.

In the nation of Bastion, most people live in fortified cities protected by Sentinels: Javelin pilots who act as the primary security and police force within the city walls. National security issues that require discretion and espionage are handled by Corvus, Bastion's intelligence and diplomatic agency. Beyond the cities is a frontier filled with dangerous creatures, exiled outlaws, a hostile insectoid race called Scars, and random disasters caused by unstable Shaper artifacts. Cities rely on Freelancers, a faction of altruistic Javelin-piloting mercenaries, to deal with these threats. In the field, Freelancers rely on the help of Cyphers, individuals who are naturally attuned to the Anthem and use resulting psychic gifts to remotely assist on missions and sense Anthem energy.

Ten years before the main campaign, an authoritarian faction called the Dominion attacked the city of Freemark, which was the Freelancers' primary base of operations. The Dominion wanted to access a Shaper relic beneath the city called the Cenotaph, believing it would grant them control over the Anthem. Their activation of the Cenotaph resulted in an explosion that annihilated Freemark and left an expanding Cataclysm in its place called the Heart of Rage.

=== Plot ===
A famed Freelancer named Haluk rallies an army of Freelancers to enter the Heart of Rage and deactivate the Cenotaph. Among them is the player's unnamed character (voiced by Sarah Elmaleh or Ray Chase), a rookie undertaking their first mission. Accompanying them is Faye, Haluk's Cypher and wife. Shortly into the mission, all the other Freelancers are killed, prompting Faye to call a retreat, with the player evacuating a wounded Haluk against his wishes. The resounding failure causes people to lose faith in the Freelancers, whose ranks are decimated. Two years later, the player has settled in Fort Tarsis, a frontier city between the Heart of Rage and Antium, Bastion's capital. Partnered with a young Cypher named Owen, they make a living completing modest Freelancer contracts for the locals. Owen aspires to be a Freelancer, despite his psychic abilities being a hindrance to piloting a Javelin.

An agent of Corvus named Tassyn hires the player to locate a spy who went missing while undercover with a smuggling gang called the Regulators. At a devastated Regulator hideout, they encounter a Dominion leader called the Monitor. The Monitor is a powerful Cypher, a skilled Javelin pilot, and participated in the assault on Freemark that created the Heart of Rage. The Monitor executes Tassyn's spy and takes a Shaper relic that they were hiding. Tassyn surmises that the Dominion is collecting relics for another attempt to reach the Cenotaph, and rehires the player to reach the Cenotaph first. She also notes that Haluk and Faye have spent the past two years developing a new plan to deactivate the Cenotaph, recruiting the pair to Tassyn's mission.

Faye and Haluk believe that the only Javelin able to survive the Heart of Rage is General Tarsis's legendary Javelin of Dawn. Within her tomb, the player's obtains Taris's signet, which acts as a key to the Fortress of Dawn- the site of her last stand and the Javelin of Dawn's resting place. At the Temple of Dawn, the player is challenged by trials of skill and resolve. After reenacting the last stand, an apparition of General Tarsis declares the player to possess the qualities of a Legionnaire of Dawn and grants access to her Javelin. Before the player can take possession of the Javelin of Dawn, their own Javelin freezes up. Owen appears and takes credit for sabotaging their Javelin so he can take the Javelin of Dawn for himself. He plans to accept the Monitor's offer to spare Fort Tarsis in exchange for assisting him with the Javelin of Dawn, and accuses the player of keeping him from his dream to be a Freelancer. Before Owen leaves in the Javelin of Dawn, Faye scans its unique shielding module, the Shield of Dawn, hoping that it can be duplicated so the player can enter the Heart of Rage with their own Javelin.

Haluk and Faye succeed in building a copy of the Shield of Dawn, but are unable to activate it. At the same time, Tassyn arrives to announce that the Dominion are nearing the Heart of Rage. Tassyn reveals that she hired the player at Faye's own request in order to replace Haluk's role as a Javelin pilot. Upset, Haluk flies his Javelin to the Fortress of Dawn to find a way to activate the Shield of Dawn, but is ambushed by the Dominion. The player arrives to find that Haluk was saved by Owen, who apologizes for his betrayal. As a peace offering, Owen gives up his own Shield of Dawn before leaving.

After activating the Shield of Dawn on their Javelin, the player returns to the Heart of Rage, with Faye and Haluk providing remote support. The player discovers that the Monitor has built a conduit to merge with the Anthem, and is forced to fight him. After the Monitor dies, Faye uses her powers to deactivate the Cenotaph and close the Heart of Rage. While celebrating in Fort Tarsis, the player is pulled away by Tassyn to see the corpse of an Urgoth recently discovered and killed inside of Bastion's borders. Suspecting another crisis, the player is asked to be ready to help again.

== Development ==
Development of Anthem started in 2012, after the release of Mass Effect 3, under the supervision of Casey Hudson, the executive producer of the original Mass Effect trilogy. Internally, the project was codenamed "Dylan" by BioWare, in reference to Bob Dylan in hopes that it would be a name that would be spoken about years later. The working title, up through 2017, was Beyond. According to Mark Darrah, a former producer at BioWare, Hudson had pitched the game to Electronic Arts as a new approach and change of direction for BioWare, incorporating live-service elements, with the potential to have monetary returns similar to the FIFA series, as to appeal to their publisher. Hudson had called it "the future of storytelling" in pitches to EA, but according to Darrah, no one at BioWare, including Hudson, had a firm idea of what that meant.

While BioWare did not have any strong ideas at the start of Anthem's development cycle, they knew they wanted an action game that players could play cooperatively, and which moved away from their Mass Effect and Dragon Age franchises. An early idea that focused the direction was the use of robotics-enhanced exosuits, akin to Iron Man's, to be able to survive on a planet that acted as a Bermuda Triangle that drew in all types of hazards and dangerous creatures to it, with the players having to survive these. It was initially stated to be a kind of mission-driven survival game rather than a loot shooter: players would team up with friends, go onto missions fighting their way to and from the site, collecting resources to upgrade their suits; all while behind the scenes, BioWare could pull various world event triggers to keep players surprised and alert to these events. The idea was that players after completing these missions would be able to share their stories with others. This was the state of the game as it was presented during EA's Electronic Entertainment Expo 2014 event. A primary concern at the early stage was scaling-up the concept in gameplay, art, and technical feasibility within the Frostbite engine.

Around August 2014, Hudson believed the team at BioWare Edmonton was in a sufficiently good place to continue without his oversight, and left BioWare. Some inside the Anthem team were concerned, as Hudson's leadership on past games kept their team on point, in contrast to the current development efforts on both Dragon Age: Inquisition and Mass Effect: Andromeda's teams. After Hudson's departure, the team started to struggle on the scaling aspects that impacted other parts of the development. In early 2015, Dragon Age's writer David Gaider was assigned to the Anthem team to help with the story. Gaider drew the story back towards something more in common with Mass Effect and Dragon Age, rather than pull away from those series. The narrative shifts put further strain on the artists and level designers to match with the story's direction. Gaider left BioWare in early 2016, and the story was brought back towards what the team had originally envisioned.

Furthermore, the team continued to struggle with the Frostbite engine, as EA's management under Patrick Söderlund wanted all its studios using the same technology. Frostbite was not originally designed for the purposes that the team had in mind for Anthem. BioWare had difficulty transitioning some of the systems they had built for Dragon Age and Mass Effect into Anthem, causing the team to scrap gameplay concepts like survival and crafting. Some of the BioWare team familiar with Frostbite were moved to support the FIFA series in 2016 when it transitioned to the Frostbite Engine, leaving fewer to help with Anthem. Four years into development, developers expressed concern that Anthem was nowhere close to the final production stages, and were facing similar issues with poor management of the project as had happened with Dragon Age: Inquisition and Mass Effect Andromeda, as few concrete decisions were being made by the lead designers. Despite trying to distance themselves from Bungie's Destiny, elements from that game, particularly related to the loot shooting aspects, started to appear into Anthem's gameplay as BioWare recognized that Bungie had greatly refined these elements.

The game features the voices of Catherine Tate, Joe Lo Truglio, Annie Wersching, Nick E. Tarabay, Rochelle Neil, Jack McBrayer, Kristen Schaal, Matthew Gravelle, Niamh McGrady, Peter Macon, and Mark Pellegrino.

=== Changes near release ===
Moving from 2016 to 2017, several events forced many of the decisions in Anthem's final design. As part of a holiday tradition in BioWare, one team provided the staff with a demo of their current project to play and test over the Christmas holidays, and Anthem had a demo available in 2016. The Christmas demo had reached Söderlund by early 2017. He expressed great concern with its state in contrast to the previous 2014 teaser, and ordered several senior members to fly to Stockholm, Sweden to discuss how to improve the game with EA DICE, Frostbite's creators. Söderlund told BioWare to create a new demo in anticipation of E3, which BioWare considered would be the end of the game if the demo did not impress Söderlund. BioWare spent six weeks to produce the best-looking demo to show Söderlund when he was to visit the studio in 2017 prior to E3. To put their best work forward, they re-added the flying aspect that had been added and removed several times over the course of development.

Söderlund was impressed with the demo, particularly the flying. That demo served as the basis for the game's reveal at E3 2017. Just weeks prior to E3, EA notified BioWare that their desired name for the game, Beyond, would be too difficult to trademark. BioWare chose Anthem, one of their backup names, instead. Separately, Mass Effect Andromeda shipped: the BioWare Austin office shifted from that to help with Anthem, while EA shuttered the Montreal offices. Andromeda had several problems at launch, drawing BioWare staff to resolve these issues. The game was not as successful, which put more pressure on the quality of Anthem. Even after resolving Andromeda, there was tension between the Edmonton and Austin teams, in part due to the lack of concrete decisions on gameplay elements.

After years in development hell, Anthem transitioned from pre-production to full production in late 2017, leading to a 16 month crunch period leading up to its official launch. As late as August, Anthem remained behind schedule. BioWare knew they would miss the expected Q4 2018 release. EA refused to allow the game to be delayed past March 2019. Meanwhile, several BioWare staff departed the studio and one of the lead gameplay designers, Corey Gaspur, suddenly died. Publisher EA cancelled work on Dragon Age 4, shifting most of its staff to Anthem, including Mark Darrah as the game's new executive producer. Hudson also returned as both the project lead and the new studio head in October 2017. Darrah focused the team on releasing Anthem by EA's deadline and firming decisions on elements of the game. BioWare developers speaking anonymously with Kotaku stated that most of Anthem was effectively developed in the year prior to release due to Darrah's leadership and pressure from EA. Because elements of Anthem were changing quickly, factors like game balance and narrative cohesion were difficult to address before launch. This further stressed the staff at BioWare and there were a large number of departures from the studio across 2017 and 2018. Drew Karpyshyn worked on the game's writing before leaving in early 2018.

=== Reworking after release and shutdown ===
EA CEO Andrew Wilson spoke on the state of Anthem in June 2019 during E3 2019, recognizing that the game had not reached the expectation EA had, but that EA still remains committed to improving the game. Wilson identified that the game generally ended up with two sets of players: those that are fans of BioWare and are expecting story-heavy content, and those that are fans of action-adventure games. Wilson said that, through playtesting, both sets of players were satisfied with Anthem up through about 30 hours of content, but afterwards the game had a diverging audience, with many of those BioWare fans finding the lack of story a disappointment. Wilson believed that BioWare will be able to evolve to find means to meet the expectations of both sets of players and will be able to improve Anthem in the long-term. In August 2019, following several months of delay, Bioware released the first timed act of Anthem's post-launch content, dubbed "Cataclysms", as part of a development plan to release three acts over a period of weeks. However, in September 2019, Bioware announced that plans for the remaining acts had been dropped and they would instead be delivering "seasonal updates" in order to improve core issues with the game. October 2019 saw the introduction of the first seasonal content launch, with heavy comparisons drawn between it and the prior Cataclysm event.

In a blog update in February 2020, BioWare said that they would be ending seasonal updates as they looked to reboot the game, requiring a "substantial reinvention" of the core game, a move comparable to Square Enix's reworking of the 2010 release of Final Fantasy XIV to the 2013 revised version. Casey Hudson said in the post that BioWare wants to "reinvent the core gameplay loop with clear goals, motivating challenges and progression with meaningful rewards – while preserving the fun of flying and fighting in a vast science-fantasy setting." BioWare Austin studio director Christian Dailey stated in a blog post in May 2020 that an "incubation team" of about 30 were evaluating Anthem's rework.

According to Bloomberg News, the fate of Anthem's rework was to be reviewed by Electronic Arts and BioWare's executives during the month of February 2021. BioWare announced on February 24, 2021, that they were discontinuing any future work on Anthem, though will continue to support the live servers for the immediate future, while the developers on the game would be transitioned to Mass Effect and Dragon Age titles. Bloomberg reported that this decision partially led EA and BioWare to cancel the multiplayer elements that had been planned in Dragon Age: Dreadwolf, instead focusing that game as a single-player experience.

On July 3, 2025, sales of premium in-game currency were discontinued, and it was announced that Anthem's servers would be shut down on January 12, 2026; since the game's content resides on its servers, its closure would render the game unplayable. The game was delisted from EA Play on August 5, though people who bought the game on that platform could download the game until it was shut down.

On January 5, 2026, some users reported that the EA app was preventing downloads for Anthem. The game was officially shut down and became unplayable on January 12, 2026. A fan-made patch was released days later, allowing the game to function independently of EA's servers.

=== Soundtrack ===
Bioware announced Sarah Schachner as Anthem's composer on August 20, 2018. Schachner was inspired by the idea of fusing fantasy and science fiction sounds to represent Anthem's setting and story: "(Bioware) were clear from the start that they wanted the music to feel somewhere between Avengers and Middle Earth. We talked about the duality of the ancient and futuristic feel of the world and the need for the music to have a sense of wonder and positivity. Not just darkness and danger. Outside of that, I was free to explore and it was really exciting to define the sound of a new [intellectual property]. People are hearing this stuff with a clean mental slate, so to speak." Several tracks feature vocalizations by Schachner processed through a vocoder and MIDI controller.

The Anthem-Original Soundtrack was released on digital music services by Lakeshore Records and EA Games on February 22, 2019.

== Marketing and release ==
BioWare Edmonton teased the game at E3 2014 during a developer diary video, only referring to as it "a new [intellectual property]" that they were developing as BioWare Montreal took the reins of Mass Effect: Andromeda.

On June 10, 2017, Anthem was formally announced with a cinematic reveal trailer during the EA Play pre-E3 press conference. On June 11, 2017, a six-minute gameplay trailer premiered during Microsoft's E3 press conference, running on Xbox One X.

At E3 2017, when the game was announced, its intended release date was Q4 2018, but was pushed back in January 2018 to early 2019, in part to make space on EA's release schedule for a new Battlefield title in late 2018 release. According to Patrick Söderlund, EA's vice president, BioWare plans to support the game with new content and updates long after the game's release, and that its launch will be "the start of maybe a 10-year journey" for BioWare.

A demo of the game was released for download on January 25, 2019, for pre-order customers, and on February 1 for the public. On February 14, 2019, a live-action short film/trailer called Conviction was released online, depicting a story which takes place before the game. The film was directed by Neill Blomkamp and produced by his independent Oats Studios. On February 15, 2019, Electronic Arts made the full-game available to Premium subscribers of their Origin Access subscription service, while both Origin Access Basic and EA Access (on Xbox One) subscribers had access to a 10-hour trial.

Anthem was released worldwide on all platforms on February 22, 2019. For its Russian marketing campaign, Electronics Arts and Russian consumer electronic retail chain M.video created a commercial voiced by television host and naturalist Nikolay Drozdov, which imitated his television program In the World of Animals. On September 13, 2019, the full game was added to Origin Access Basic and EA Access.

== Reception ==
Reception

Aggregate score
Aggregator	Score
Metacritic	PC: 59/100; PS4: 54/100; XONE: 65/100

Review scores
Publication	Score
Destructoid	7/10
Electronic Gaming Monthly	7.5/10
Eurogamer	3/5
Game Informer	7/10
GameRevolution	2.5/5
GameSpot	6/10
GamesRadar+	2.5/5
IGN	6.5/10
PC Gamer (UK)	55%
USgamer	2.5/5
VideoGamer.com	5/10

Edit on Wikidata

Anthem received "mixed or average reviews" according to review aggregator Metacritic.

Reviewer Kallie Plagge from GameSpot said that "Anthem has good ideas but it struggles significantly with the execution." IGN's James Duggan said: "Anthem has energetic combat but it saves too much of what precious little content it has for the endgame, making playing through its mismatched story a tediously repetitive grind." Sam Loveridge from GamesRadar+, was more critical of the game, saying that "Anthem is ultimately severely flawed, and very unfinished. There's half a good game in there, but it doesn't do enough to diminish the overall feeling of emptiness and repetition". Mike Williams from USgamer called the game a "frustrating experience", feeling that, aside from being tedious, the game lacked purpose and "ultimately doesn't feel like the best BioWare can do". PC Gamer said: "Anthem's disjointed story, boring loot, repetitive missions, and shallow endgame are all disappointing. At least it's pretty". EGM's Nick Plessas was more generous toward the game, saying: "Anthem is a beautiful car that is an absolute joy to drive...", despite saying that "...the wheels will periodically fall off". Destructoid's Chris Carter called the game a "fun experience" despite "some hard-to ignore faults".

In spite of the mixed reception, Anthem received praise for its combat and flight. GameSpot described the flight as "freeing, serene and exhilarating all at once", despite being disappointed that the player will be "frequently forced to land or stay on the ground". USgamer was also fond of the flying experience, stating "Flying through massive tunnels, through monuments to the old civilizations, or simply through the trees of a forest is awe-inspiring". When mentioning the combat, IGN said that "Anthem's combat is initially strong, engaging, and unique, thanks in part to responsive flight controls that feel good on both controller and mouse and keyboard".

Several critics noted long loading screens that could take up to 5 minutes or longer and could surpass the time necessary to complete an average in-game mission. The loading times were later improved as part of the game's day-one patch, among other improvements.

=== Sales ===
Anthem topped retail sales charts in the UK during its first week of release, although its total launch week retail sales matched half of those of BioWare's previous game Mass Effect: Andromeda. In Japan, Anthem reached the top of the sales charts with 78,000 copies sold at launch. In North America, according to NPD data tracking, "Anthem represents the second-highest launch month sales ever recorded for a BioWare developed game, trailing only the March 2012 release of Mass Effect 3". Anthem was at the top of PS4 downloaded video games via PlayStation Store by March 2019. SuperData reported that the game had earned over $100 million in digital revenue in February 2019, of which $3.5 million came from in-game purchases.

Anthem failed to meet Electronic Arts' sales expectations. With a target set at 6 million copies to be sold by the end of March, EA CEO Andrew Wilson said Anthem did not reach the sales goal, while EA CFO Blake Jorgensen admitted that more money was expected to come from the game's microtransactions as well. In June 2019, Wilson reiterated how Anthem was not working as planned in keeping players engaged, although he stated that BioWare would continue to support the game.

=== Awards ===
Year	Award	Category	Result	Ref.
2018	Game Critics Awards	Best of Show	Nominated	
2018	Game Critics Awards	Best Original Game	Nominated	
2018	Game Critics Awards	Best PC Game	Won	
2018	Game Critics Awards	Best Action Game	Won	
2018	Game Critics Awards	Best Online Multiplayer	Nominated	
2018	2018 Golden Joystick Awards	Most Wanted Game	Nominated	
2018	Gamers' Choice Awards	Most Anticipated Game	Nominated	
2020	Visual Effects Society Awards	Outstanding Visual Effects in a Commercial ("Conviction")	Nominated	
2020	NAVGTR Awards	Original Dramatic Score, New IP	Nominated	
