= Buratino (film) =

- Theatrical release poster
- Directed by: Igor Voloshin
- Written by: Andrey Zolotarev; Aksinya Borisova; Alina Tyazhlova
- Based on: The Golden Key, or The Adventures of Buratino by Alexei Tolstoy
- Produced by: Mikhail Vrubel; Aleksandr Andryushchenko; Fyodor Bondarchuk; Denis Baglay; Vadim Smirnov; Anastasiya Korchagina; Elena Bystrova; Pavel Gorin; Antonina Li; Aksinya Borisova; Daria Chigirinova; Denis Dubovik; Konstantin Ernst
- Starring: Vitaliya Korniyenko; Aleksandr Yatsenko; Anastasiya Talyzina; Mark Eydelshteyn; Stepan Belozyorov; Ruzil Minekaev; Fyodor Bondarchuk; Lev Zulkarnaev; Viktoriya Isakova; Alexander Petrov; Svetlana Nemolyaeva
- Cinematography: Maxim Zhukov
- Edited by: Alexey Starchenko; Alexander Puzyrev
- Music by: Alexey Rybnikov; Dmitry Rybnikov
- Production companies: National Media Group; Vodorod Film Company; Art Pictures Studio; Art Pictures Distribution; Channel One; Studio Plus; Cinema Fund; Russian Radio
- Distributed by: National Media Group Film Distribution
- Release dates: December 23, 2025 (KARO 11 October); January 1, 2026 (Russia)
- Running time: 102 minutes
- Country: Russia
- Language: Russian
- Budget: ₽1.3 billion $17.1 million
- Box office: ₽2.3 billion; $31.4 million

Buratino, also known as Pinocchio (Russian: Буратино) is a 2026 Russian musical fantasy film that is a remake of Leonid Nechayev's 1975 Soviet television film The Adventures of Buratino.

The film was directed by Igor Voloshin, an adaptation of the Soviet children's novel The Golden Key, or The Adventures of Buratino by Aleksey Nikolayevich Tolstoy (English: Alexei Tolstoy) and its literary source, the 1883 Italian novel The Adventures of Pinocchio by Carlo Collodi. The film stars child actress Vitaliya Korniyenko as the title character, and Aleksandr Yatsenko as Papa Carlo, alongside Anastasiya Talyzina, Mark Eydelshteyn, Stepan Belozyorov, Ruzil Minekaev, Fyodor Bondarchuk, Lev Zulkarnaev, Viktoriya Isakova, Alexander Petrov, and Svetlana Nemolyaeva.

Principal photography lasted from October to December 2024, with filming taking place at the MosKino Cinema Park in New Moscow.

The film will also feature legendary melodies by Alexey Rybnikov, the creator of the original soundtrack for the 1975 television film.

Buratino was theatrically released in Russia on January 1, 2026, by National Media Group Film Distribution.

== Plot ==
Three cockroaches steal a golden key from the wise old woman Tortilla the Turtle and plant it in the closet of the carpenter Carlo. Along with the key, they leave a note telling him to use it to open the metal door behind the old fireplace and make any wish. Carlo wants only one thing – a son. His wish almost comes true, but at the last moment, Tortilla the Turtle interrupts them and takes the key. However, Carlo suddenly notices a log in his closet starting to move and decides to make a puppet out of it. The resulting wooden boy immediately comes to life and begins to talk. Papa Carlo happily accepts his son and names him Buratino. Papa Carlo tries to enroll his son in school, giving up his jacket to buy an alphabet book. But at school, neither the principal nor the students accept Buratino. Realizing he's different, Buratino runs away in tears and runs to the theater. Having given the alphabet instead of a ticket, Buratino watches a performance performed by the theater actors – Malvina, Artemon the Poodle, Pierrot and Harlequin. When the actors begin to pretend to attack Pierrot, Buratino, unaware that everything in the theater is fake, comes on stage and defends the poor fellow. The theater's director, Karabas Barabas, notices this and decides to take Buratino as his star. Papa Carlo is reluctant to give him up, but after Karabas Barabas threatens to roast Buratino at the stake, he agrees. Buratino mistakenly believes his father no longer loves him.

Buratino becomes famous thanks to numerous performances around the world, and with the money he earns, he buys a new jacket for his father and decides to return, hoping that Papa Carlo will love him again. But after learning from the performers that Karabas Barabas is beating them, Buratino decides to give him an ultimatum. However, this doesn't end well, and the enraged Karabas Barabas decides to roast Buratino at the stake. The performers, who have sincerely fallen in love with Buratino, rescue him and all escape together. During their escape, they miss each other. Buratino, alone, ends up in the Land of Fools, where he meets street swindlers Alice the Fox and Basilio the Cat. Meanwhile, due to the departure of the performers, Karabas Barabas's theater suffers losses. Karabas decides to play Buratino himself on stage, but the audience is not happy and throws tomatoes at him. He becomes depressed.

Alice the Fox and Basilio the Cat stage a performance starring Buratino, stealing money and jewelry for themselves and jackets for Buratino from the audience. The swindlers also develop a genuine love for the puppet, and as a farewell, they even give her a tattoo on her finger. Returning to town, where his worried father and the performers are searching for him, Buratino happily gives his father all the jackets, hoping that he will love him again. But the townspeople recognize their stolen jackets and accuse Buratino of theft. Realizing he has committed a wrongdoing, Buratino runs away in tears. Karabas Barabas tricks his assistant Duremar into telling him that the performers are with Papa Carlo (who saw them searching for Buratino together) and sets off after them.

Arriving in the forest, Buratino decides he's a tree and wants to stay that way. But at that moment, Tortilla the Turtle emerges from the lake in a submarine and invites the boy to her home. Having learned from her the reason for his origin and how Papa Carlo longed for a son, Buratino asks her for a golden key to make a wish for his father to give him the son he deserves. She happily gives him the key, asking him to repeat it word for word when making his wish. Returning home, Buratino prepares to fulfill his father's wish, but they are met in the closet by Karabas Barabas, who shoots Carlo with a crossbow. Buratino jumps, shielding his father. Duremar arrives with the police and arrests Karabas. Having removed the arrow, Buratino begins to lose all the magical energy that kept him alive. With the last of his strength, Buratino opens the door with the key and wishes for Papa Carlo to have the son he truly deserves. The same thing happens, and in the end, Buratino emerges again. Papa Carlo tells the boy that he is the son he deserves, and they all embrace.

Time passes, and Papa Carlo becomes a good father to all the artists, with whom he creates a new theater. Buratino convinces Alice the Fox and Basilio the Cat to use their talents for good. While in prison, Karabas Barabas teaches acting skills to the jailers. At the film's finale, all the main and supporting characters perform a new song about Buratino.

== Cast ==
- Vitaliya Korniyenko as Buratino, a puppet
- Aleksandr Yatsenko as Papa Carlo, an organ grinder, and Buratino's adoptive father
- Anastasiya Talyzina as Malvina, a blue-haired girl, and an artist at the Karabas Theater
- Mark Eydelshteyn as Artemon the Poodle, Malvina's devoted servant, and an artist at the Karabas Theater
- Stepan Belozyorov as Pierrot, a poet in love with Malvina, and an artist at the Karabas Theater
- Ruzil Minekaev as Harlequin, Pierrot's stage partner, and an artist at the Karabasa Theater
- Fyodor Bondarchuk as Karabas Barabas, a wealthy doctor of puppet sciences and director of a puppet theater
- Lev Zulkarnaev as Duremar, a seller of medicinal leeches
- Viktoriya Isakova as Alice the Fox, a street swindler who pretends to be lame
- Alexander Petrov as Basilio the Cat, a street swindler who pretends to be blind
- Svetlana Nemolyaeva as Tortilla the Turtle, a wise old turtle from the pond
- Konstantin Khabensky as Professor Owl, a doctor
- Daniil Vorobyov as Feldsher Toad, a paramedic
- Sergey Burunov as Healer Mantis, a herbalist
- Gosha Kutsenko as Shushara the Rat, a evil rat and a little rat
- Andrey Lyovin as Giuseppe the Blue Nose, a carpenter

=== Voice cast ===
- Nikolay Drozdov as Alessandro the Cockroach
- Anton Shastun as Anton the Cockroach
- Vanya Dmitrienko as Giovanni the Cockroach

== Production ==
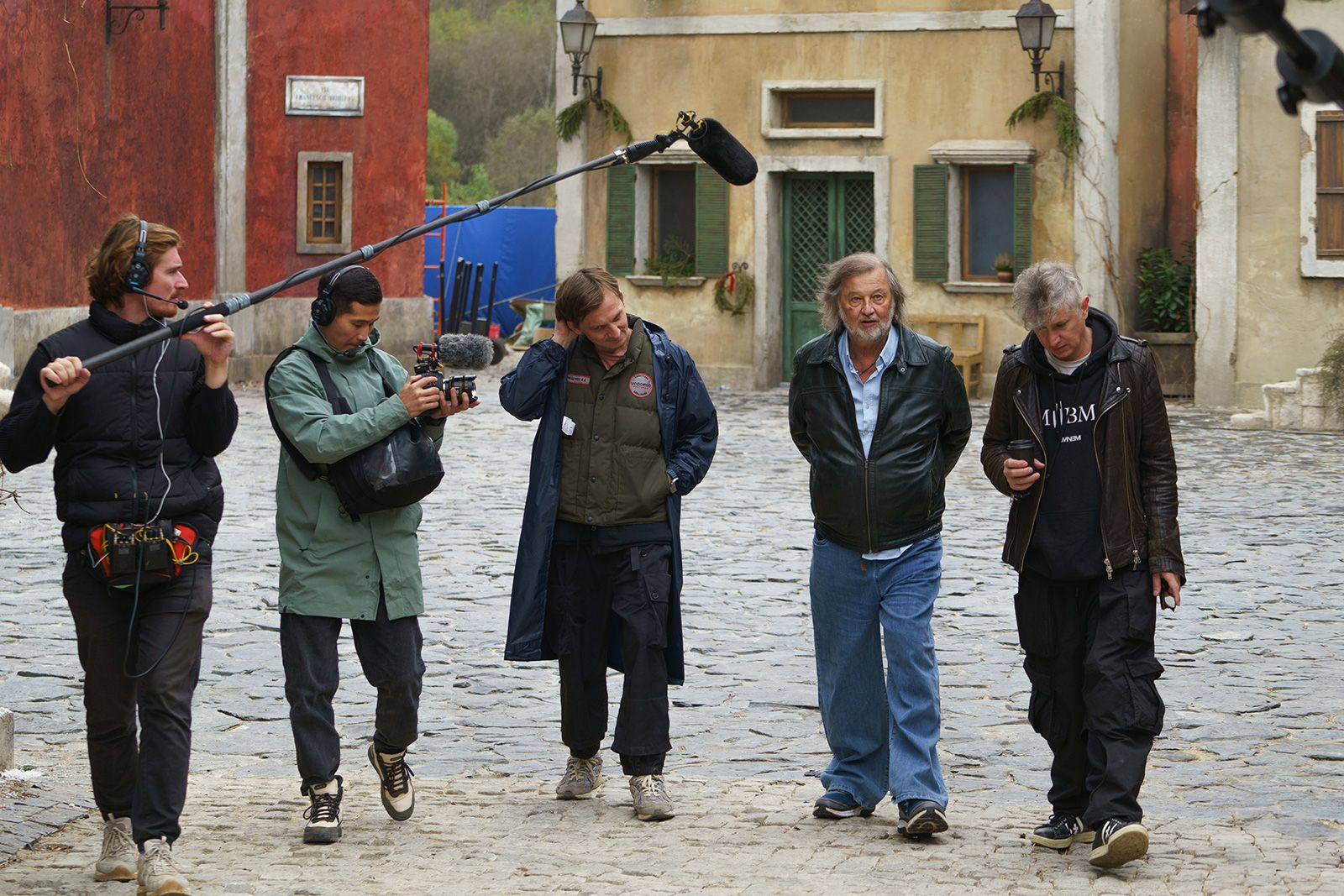
Aleksandr Andryushchenko, Alexey Rybnikov, and Igor Voloshin on the set of the film Buratino in 2024.

=== Development ===
The start of production on the film was announced in May 2023. In the summer of 2023, the project was successfully presented at a pitching event for major studios, organized by the Russian Cinema Fund.

Igor Voloshin is directing the project, and the original plot featuring characters beloved by several generations of viewers is being developed by screenwriters Aksinya Borisova and Andrey Zolotarev. The production is handled by the Vodorod Film Company, led by Mikhail Vrubel and Aleksandr Andryushchenko, with the participation of Art Pictures Studio, producers Fyodor Bondarchuk and partners (supported by the Cinema Fund). According to the film crew, in addition to Alexei Tolstoy's book The Golden Key, or The Adventures of Buratino, is based on the story of Carlo Collodi's The Adventures of Pinocchio.

=== Casting ===
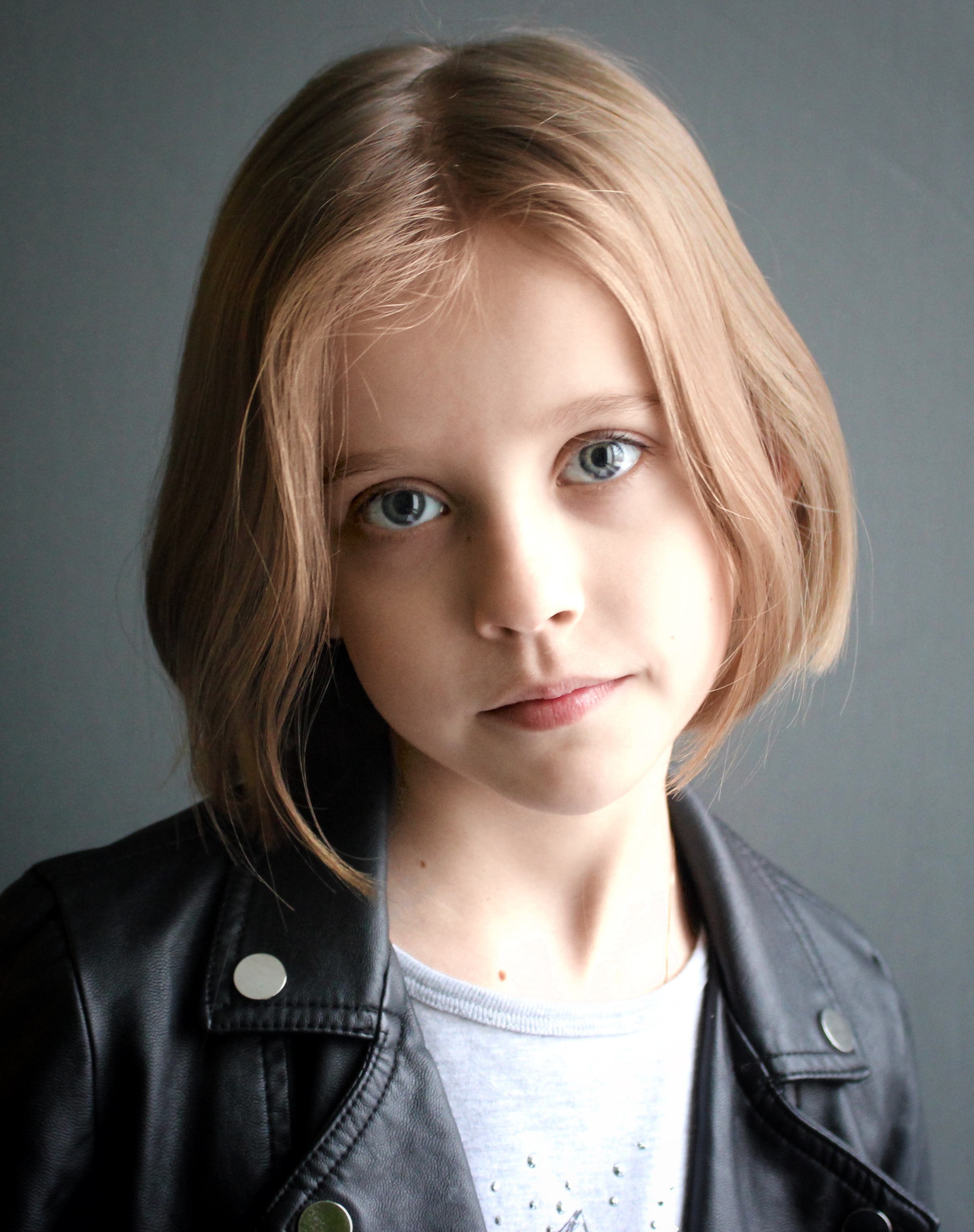
Vitaliya Korniyenko plays the role of Buratino.

By April 2024, the acting team had been formed. The role of Buratino will be played by 14-year-old Vitaliya Korniyenko, a child actress who plays a wooden boy in a mocap suit that uses sensors to track and record movements.

The roles of the living puppet's friends were played not by children, but by adult actors. Thus, Anastasiya Talyzina will play Malvina, a girl with blue hair, and her faithful dog, Artemon the Poodle, will be played by Mark Eydelshteyn. Stepan Belozyorov will play the sad, poetic Pierrot, while his opposite, the bright, playful Harlequin, will be played by Ruzil Minekaev. And the young actor Lev Zulkarnaev will play Duremar, Karabas Barabas's assistant.

In the cast, Aleksandr Yatsenko will play a loving father, Papa Carlo, and producer Fyodor Bondarchuk has been entrusted with the role of the cruel Karabas Barabas. As for the cunning couple, Basilio the Cat and Alice the Fox, they were assigned to Alexander Petrov and Viktoriya Isakova. And People's Artist of the RSFSR Svetlana Nemolyaeva was entrusted with the role of the wise Tortilla. Interesting details can be seen on the characters' clothes. For example, Alice has a braid attached to the back of her skirt, which resembles a tail, and a canvas with a turtle shell print was used in Tortilla's clothes.

=== Filming ===
Principal photography for the film Buratino began in October 2024 in Moscow and the region of Moscow Oblast, specifically at the MosKino Cinema Park, where a large-scale Italian town from the late 19th and early 20th centuries was specially constructed. The 7,000-square-meter set included squares, streets, and architecture reminiscent of old Europe, creating a fairytale atmosphere. This is one of the first large-scale projects of the new film cluster. Filming was completed by December 2024.

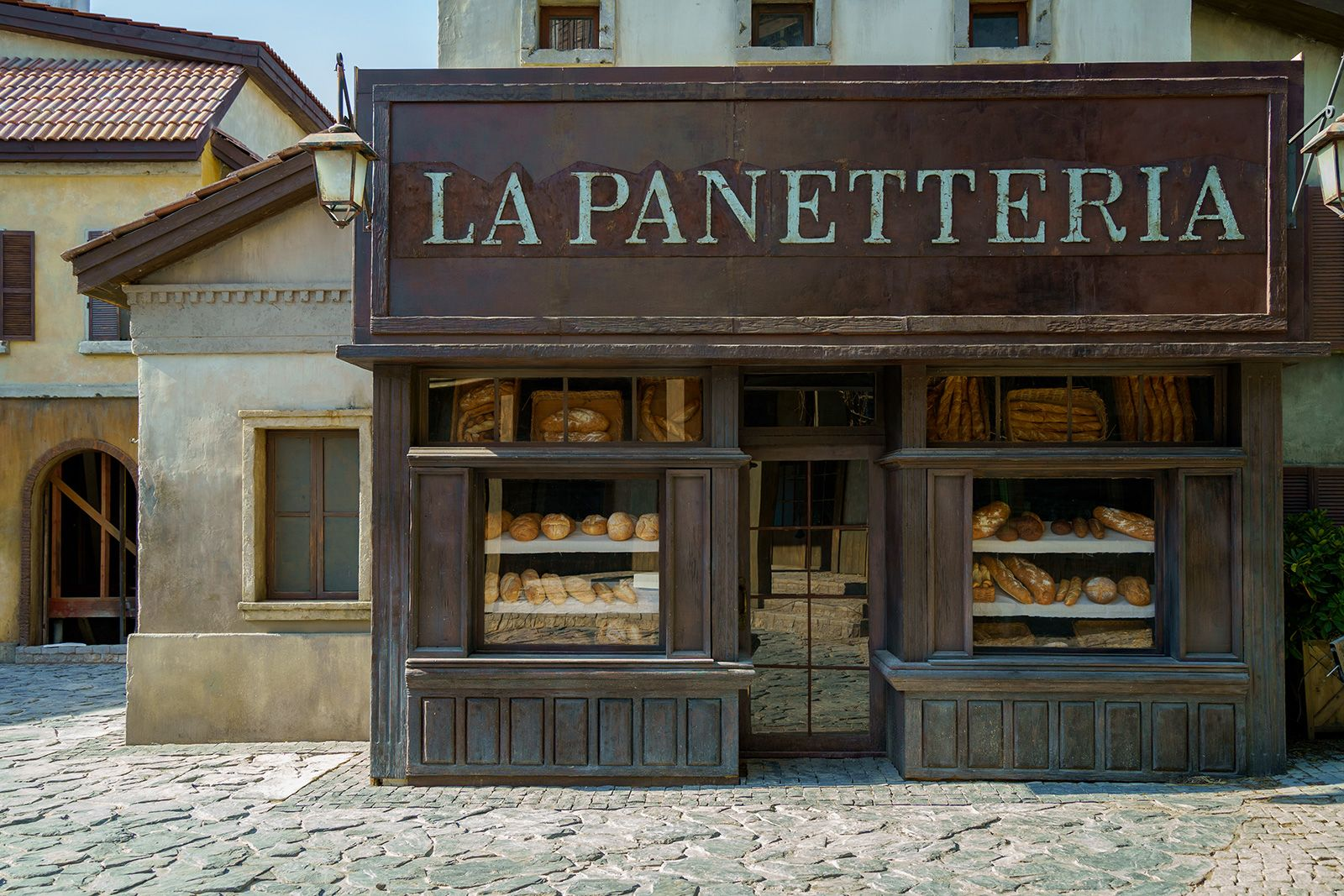
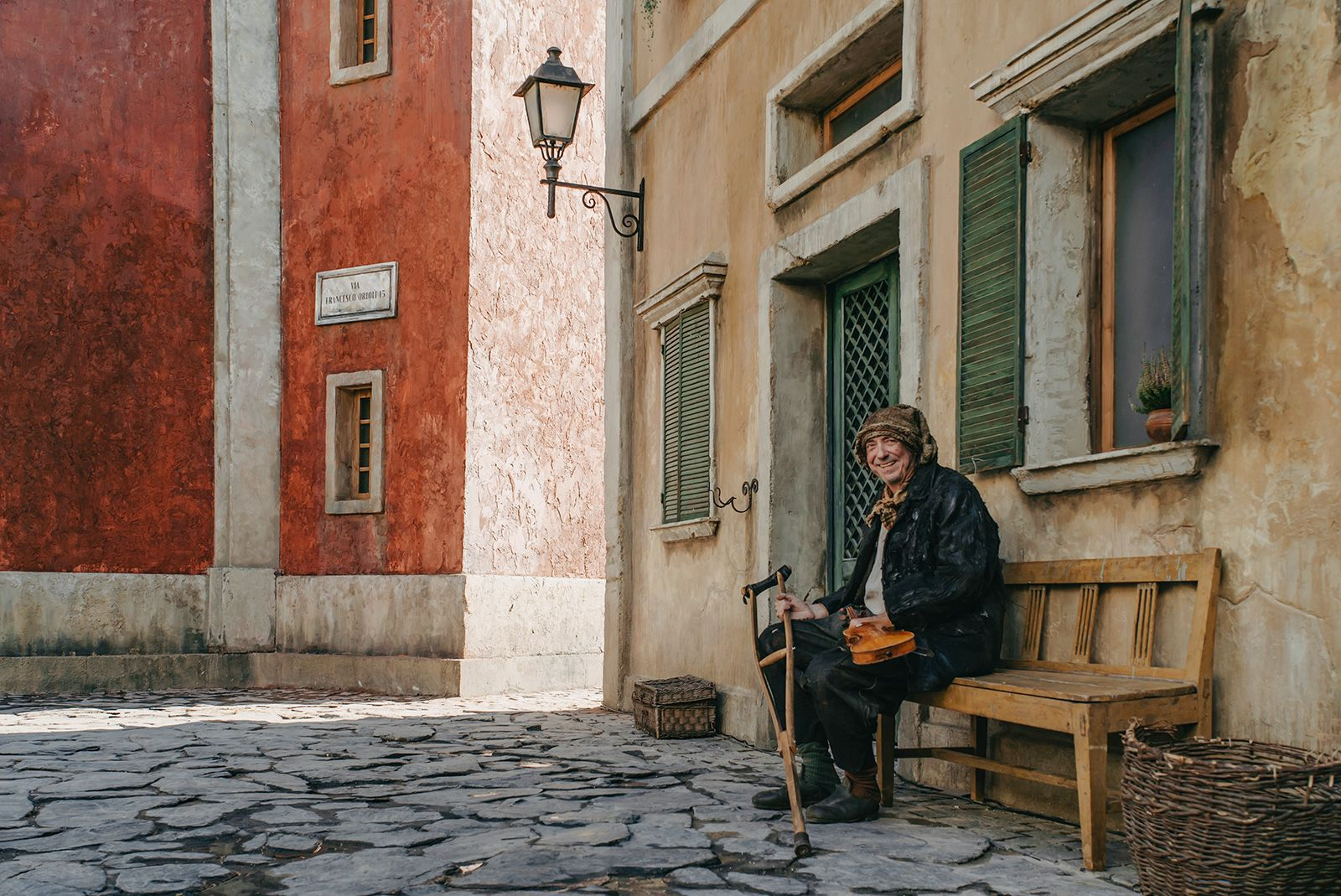
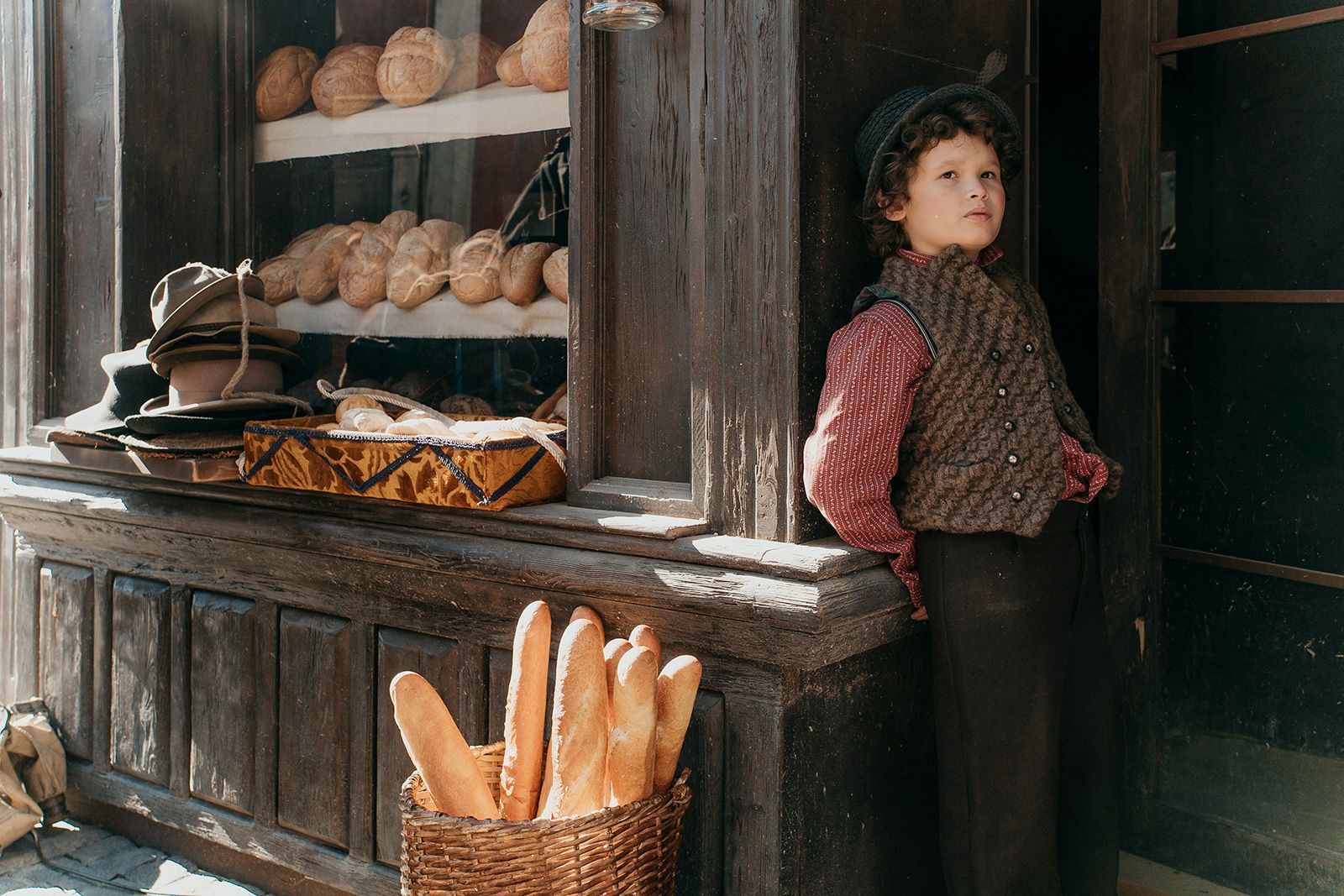
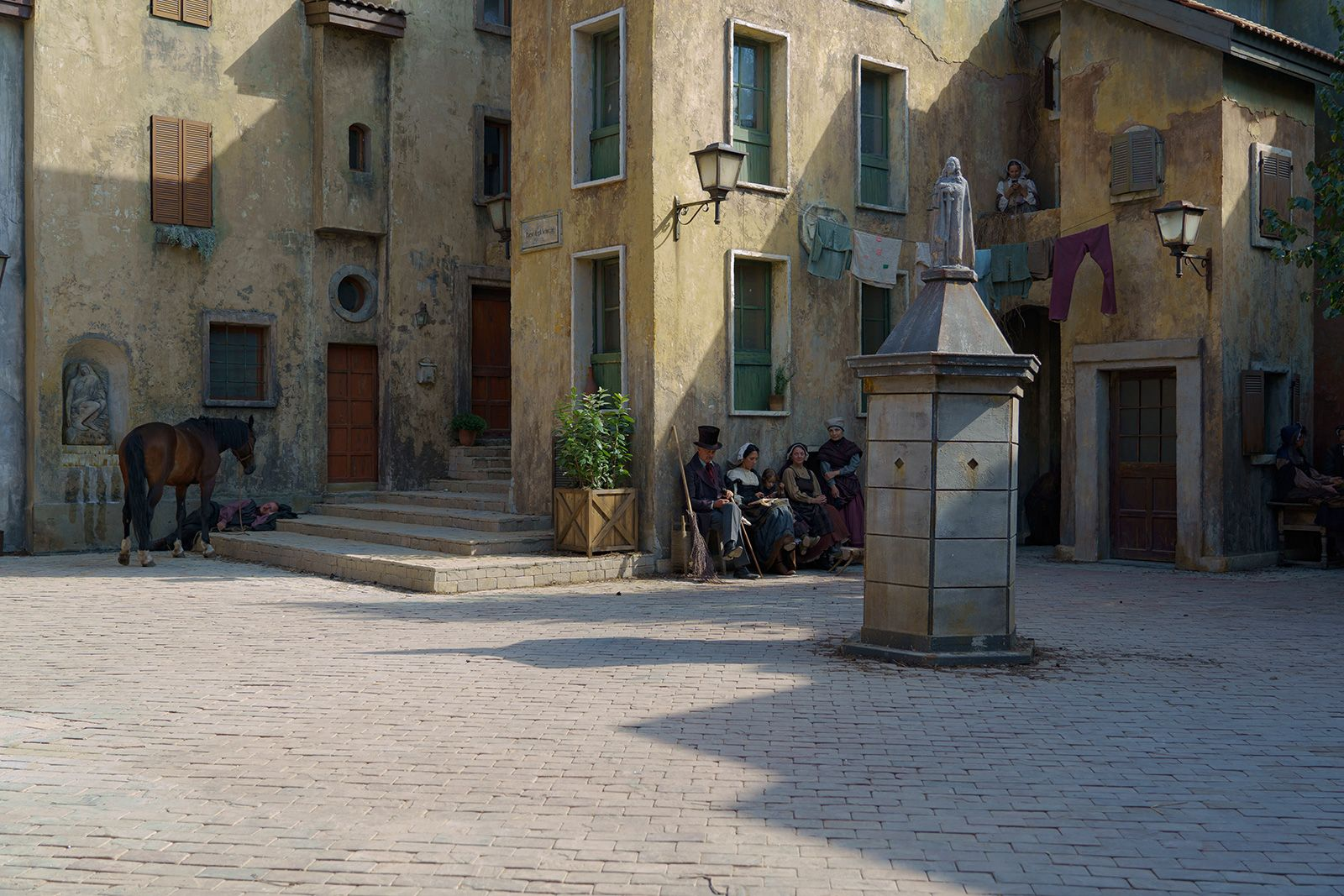
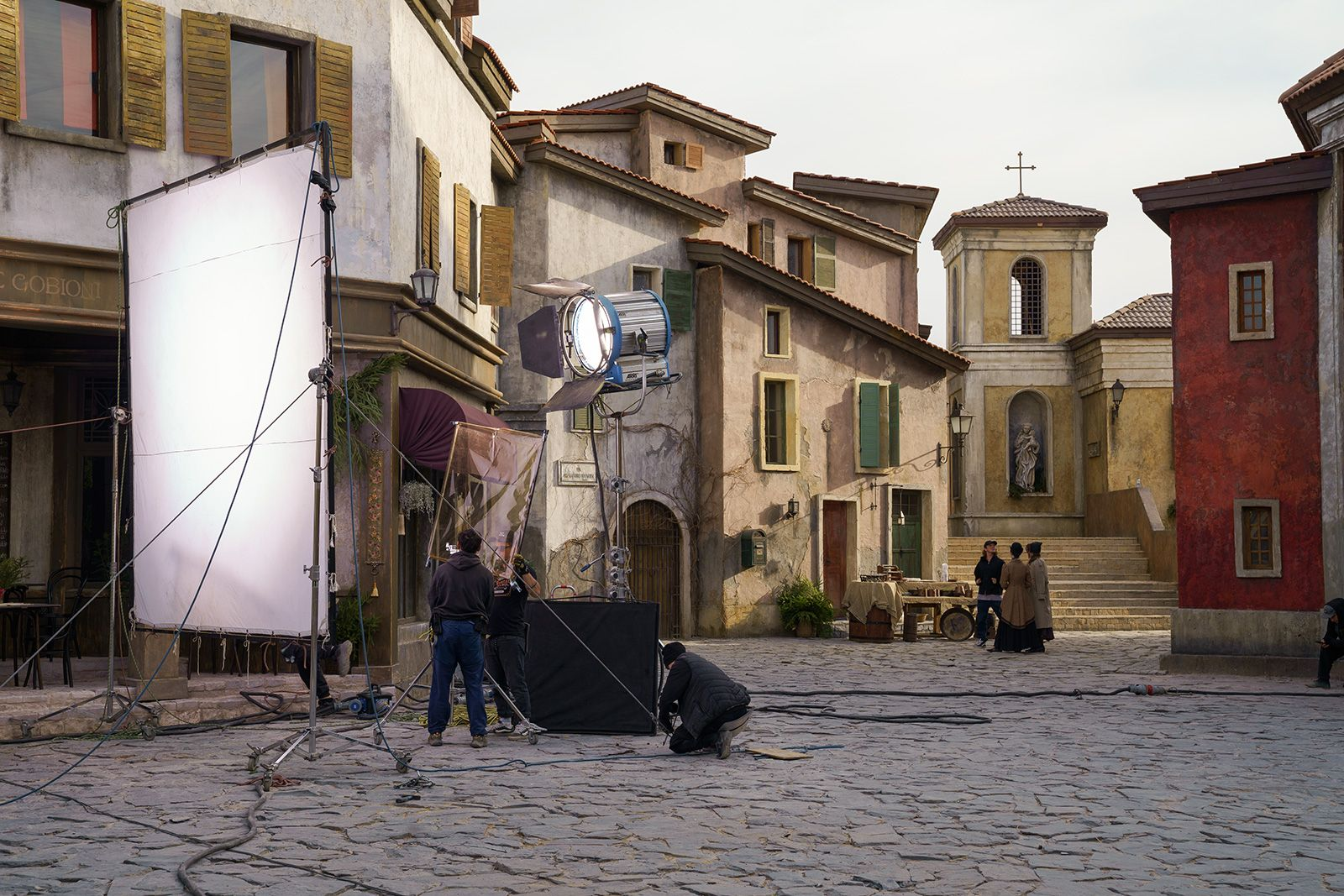
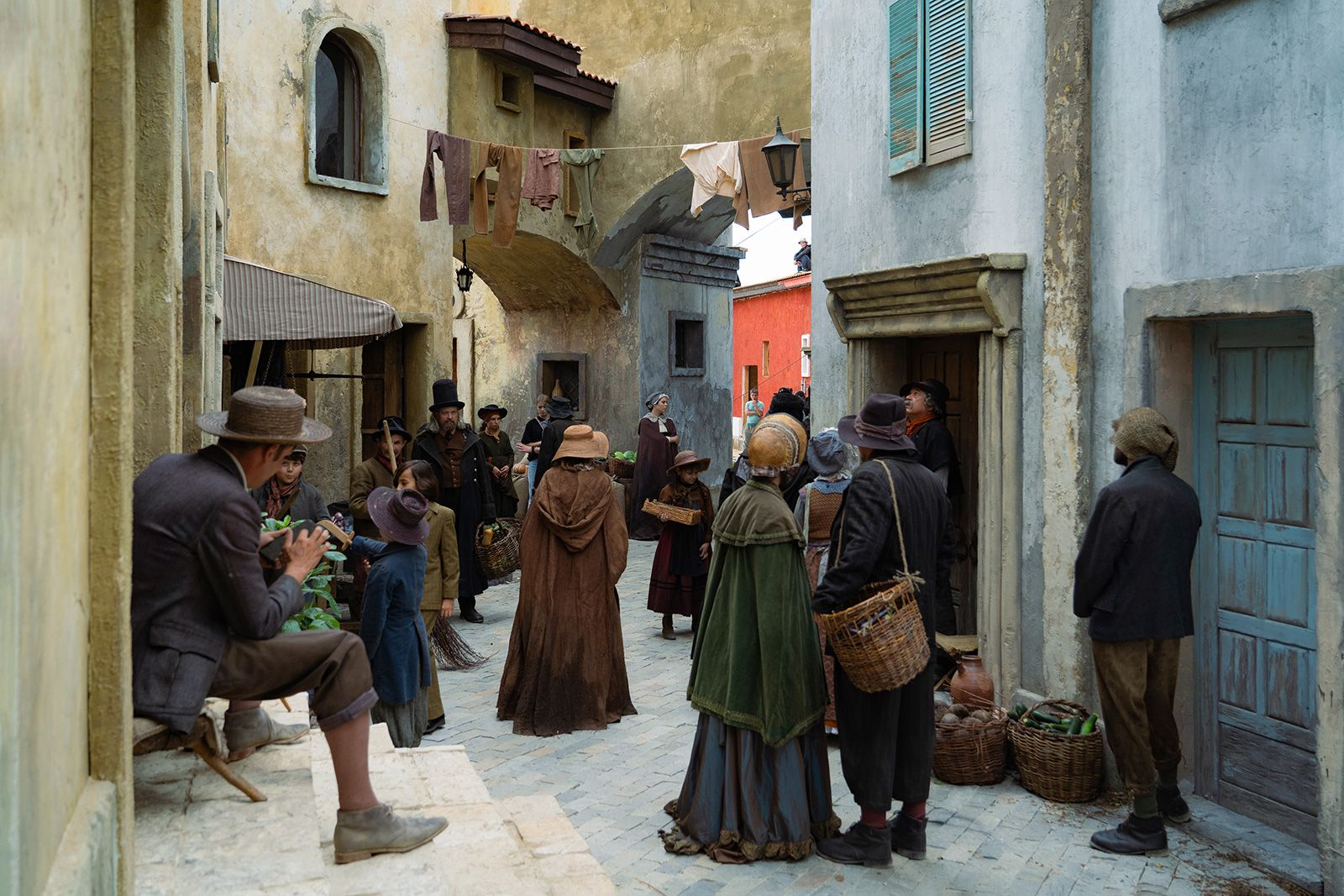
The MosKino Cinema Park

=== Visual effects ===
Vitaliya Korniyenko will transform into the real-life wooden boy Buratino on the big screen using motion capture technology.

Motion capture technology was used in the filming. Special makeup was applied to Vitaliya Korniyenko's body for 30 minutes, and putting on the costume took another half hour. Her movements and facial expressions were then digitized and used to animate Buratino's figure.

== Music ==
The film's soundtrack was created by Alexey Rybnikov and his son, Dmitry Rybnikov. The composer wrote the music for the 1975 Soviet film The Adventures of Buratino – its main song, Bu-ra-ti-no!, was co-written with poet Yuri Entin. It became one of the key musical themes, now firmly associated with the film and its protagonist. Alexey Rybnikov also wrote the music for one of the most famous Russian rock operas, Juno and Avos.

When writing the film's soundtrack, Alexey and Dmitry Rybnikov used artificial intelligence: it helped create the perfect Italian pronunciation for one of the songs.

== Release ==
=== Marketing ===
The first teaser trailer of Buratino was released on December 19, 2024. The second trailer was released on September 12, 2025. On the same day, Russian cinemas presented two more family premieres: Cheburashka 2 and Prostokvashino (film).

=== Theatrical ===
Buratino had its premiere at their “KARO 11 October” cinema center on New Arbat Avenue in Moscow on December 23, 2025, and was theatrically released by National Media Group Film Distribution in the Russian Federation on January 1, 2026, to coincide with the 50th anniversary of the classic Soviet film adaptation of 1975.

== Reception ==
=== Box office ===
In its first two days of release, the film grossed 524.5 million rubles, with pre-sales totaling approximately 184 million rubles, and over 226 million rubles on its first day. By the end of its four-day run, the film had grossed over 1 billion rubles. As of January 11, 2026, the film had surpassed the 2 billion ruble mark in total box office receipts.

== Sequels ==
In December 2024, distributor National Media Group announced two sequels. The second part will be released on January 1, 2028, and the third on January 1, 2029.
