= Roman Isaevich Zlotin =

Soviet-American biogeographer (1940-2023)

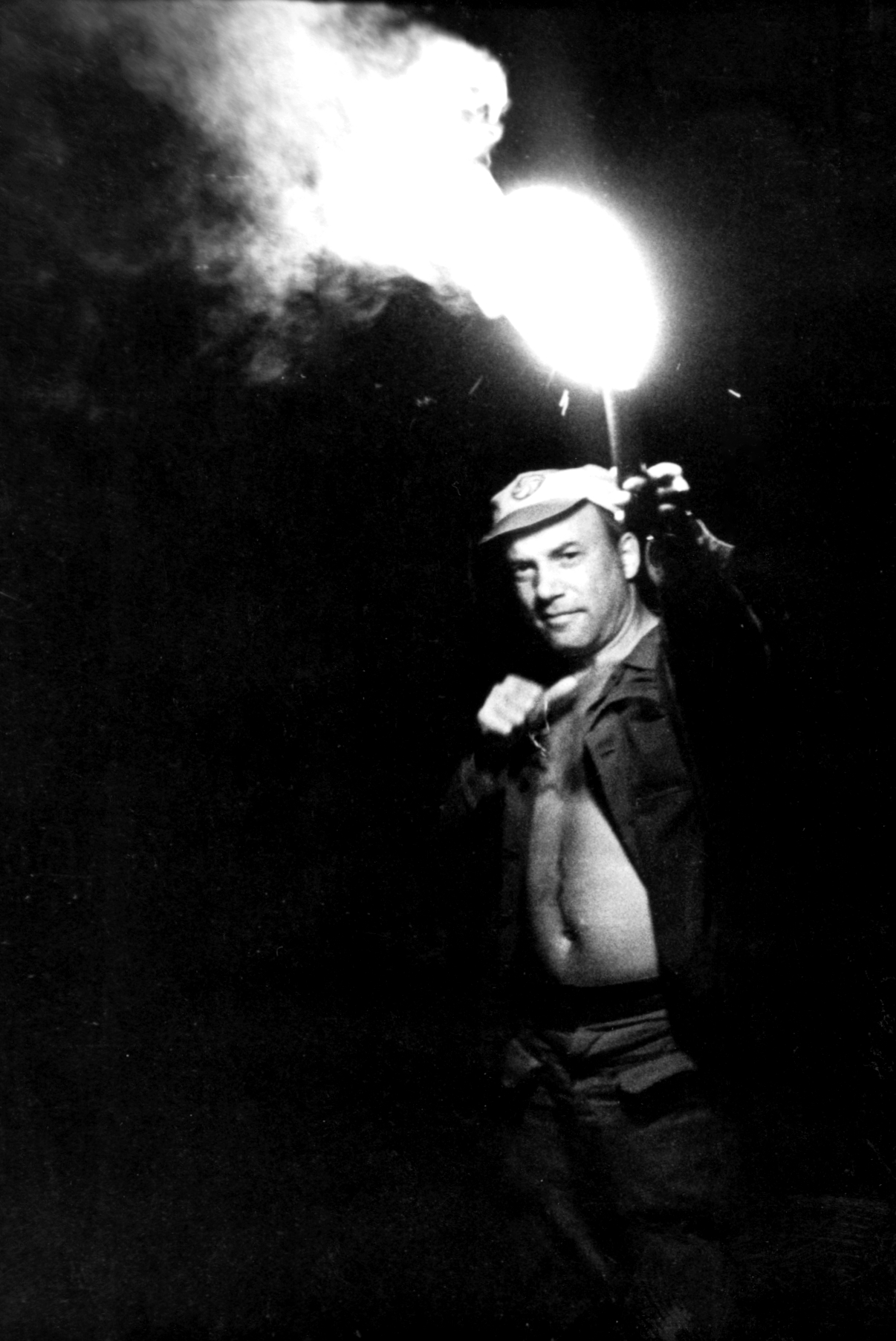
- Kyzylkum Desert, 1988
- Born: 22 November 1940; Moscow, USSR
- Died: 26 February 2023 (aged 82); Bloomington, Indiana
- Education: Moscow State University (1963)
- Known for: head of the Biogeography Laboratory
- Scientific career
- Fields: zoology, biogeography

Roman Isaevich Zlotin (Russian: Роман Исаевич Злотин; 22 November 1940 – 26 February 2023) was a Soviet and American biogeographer, zoologist, and ecologist. He was the head of the Biogeography Laboratory at the Institute of Geography of the USSR Academy of Sciences / Russian Academy of Sciences (1983–1994), and a professor at Indiana University Bloomington and the University of New Mexico (1994–2020).

== Biography ==
He was born on 22 November 1940 in Moscow. He spent his childhood in the Khamovniki District.

He received his secondary education at Moscow School No. 7, located at Kazansky Lane, building 10.

From 1952 to 1959, he participated in the work of the biological circle of the All-Russian Society for the Protection of Nature (VOOP) under the leadership of Pyotr Petrovich Smolin. Along with Boris Vilensky, Pyotr Vtorov, Yuri Puzyachenko, Olga Shokhina, Mikhail Chernyakhovsky, Leonid Lisovenko, and Nikolai Drozdov, they became prominent representatives of the second generation of VOOP members. Within VOOP, the trio Zlotin-Vtorov-Lisovenko was supervised by Yuri Ravkin, under whose guidance they prepared their candidate's (Ph.D.) work in the circle. Due to frequent expeditions, he was held back a year in the 8th grade and went to the Prioksko-Terrasny Nature Reserve for the summer.

From 1958 to 1963, he studied at the Faculty of Geography of Moscow State University, graduating from the Department of Biogeography.

=== Scientific work ===
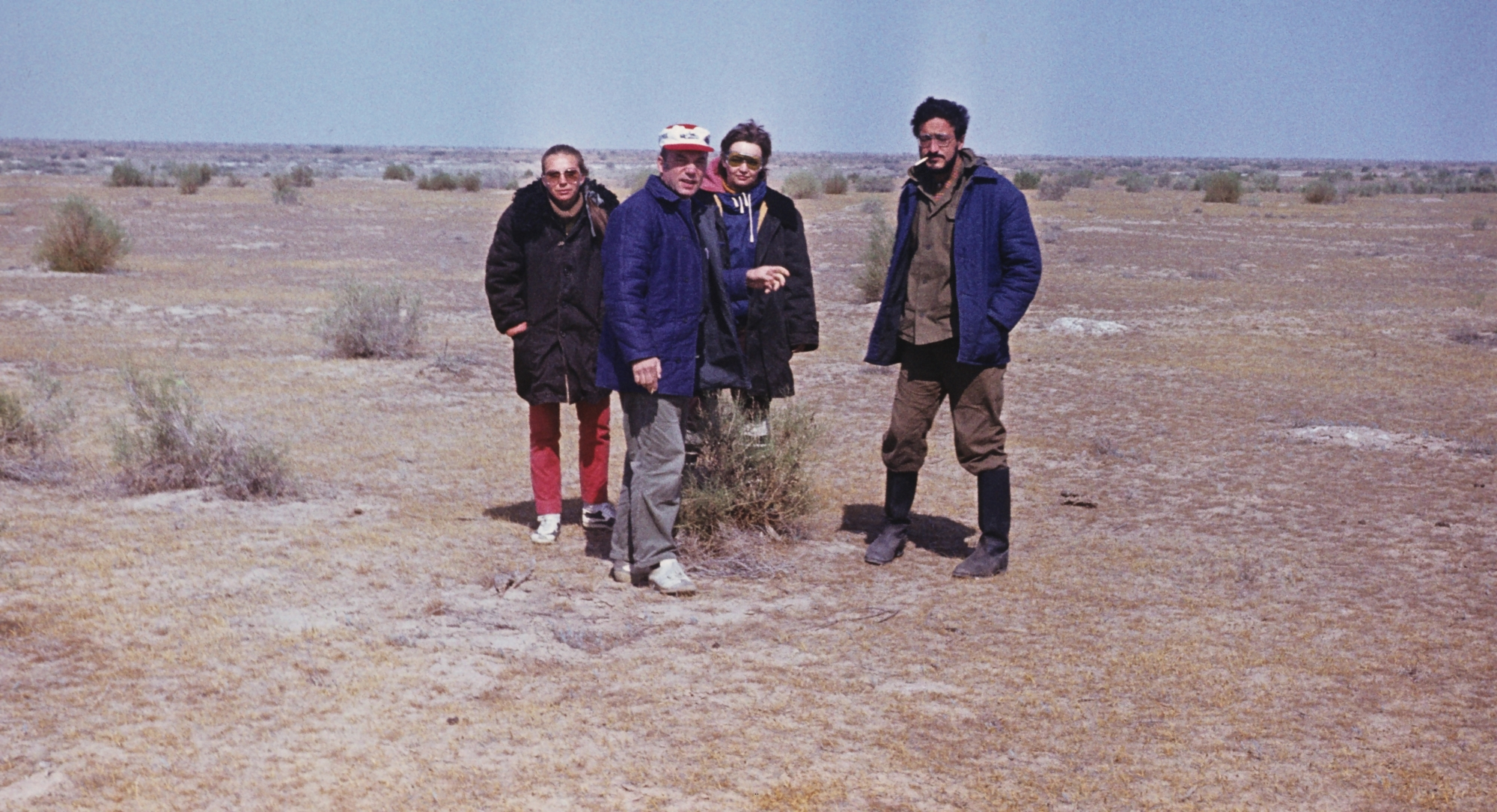
Expedition to the Kyzyl-Kum, 1989

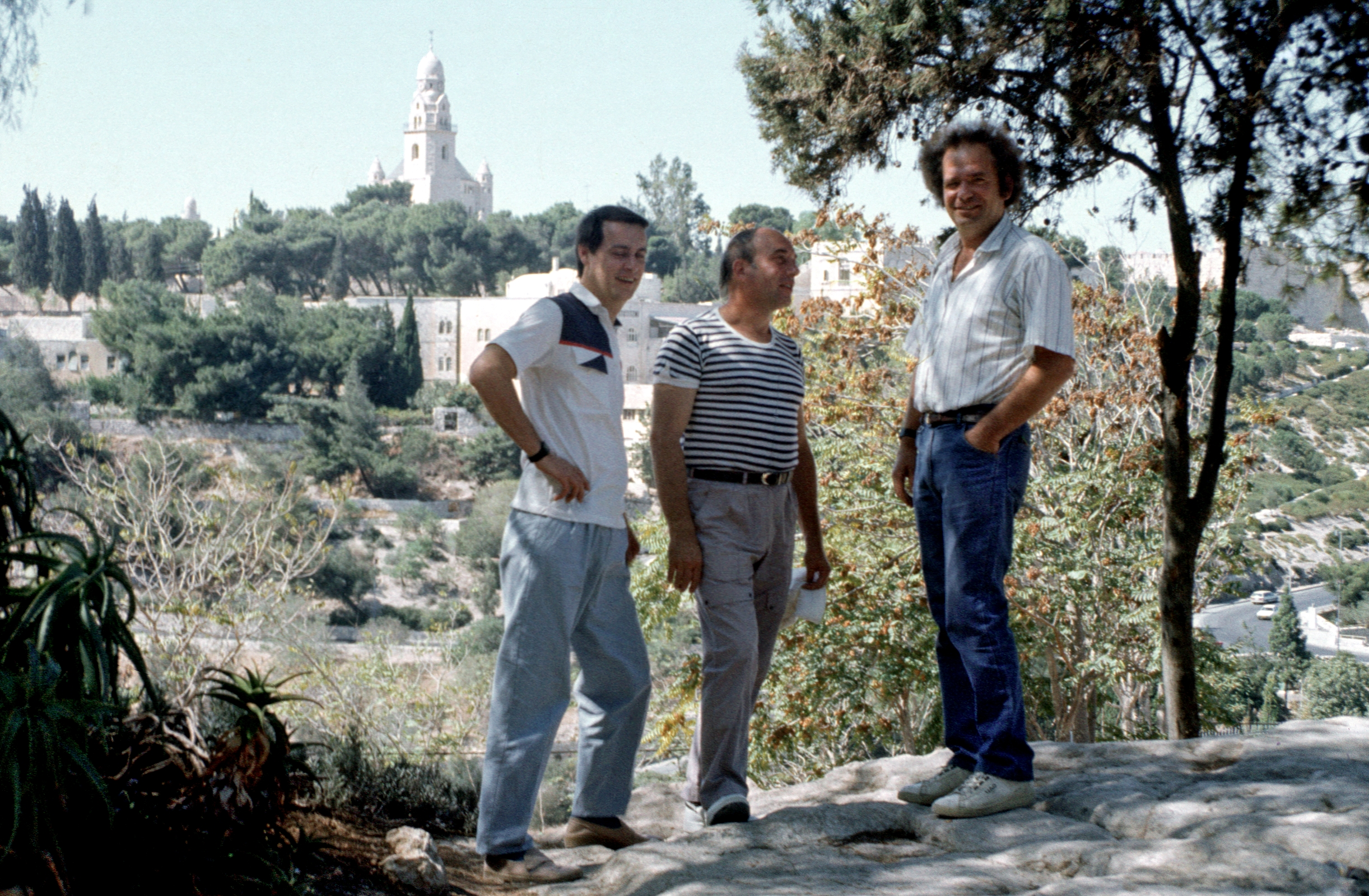
with Ivan Y. Chernov Garden of Gethsemane, 1991

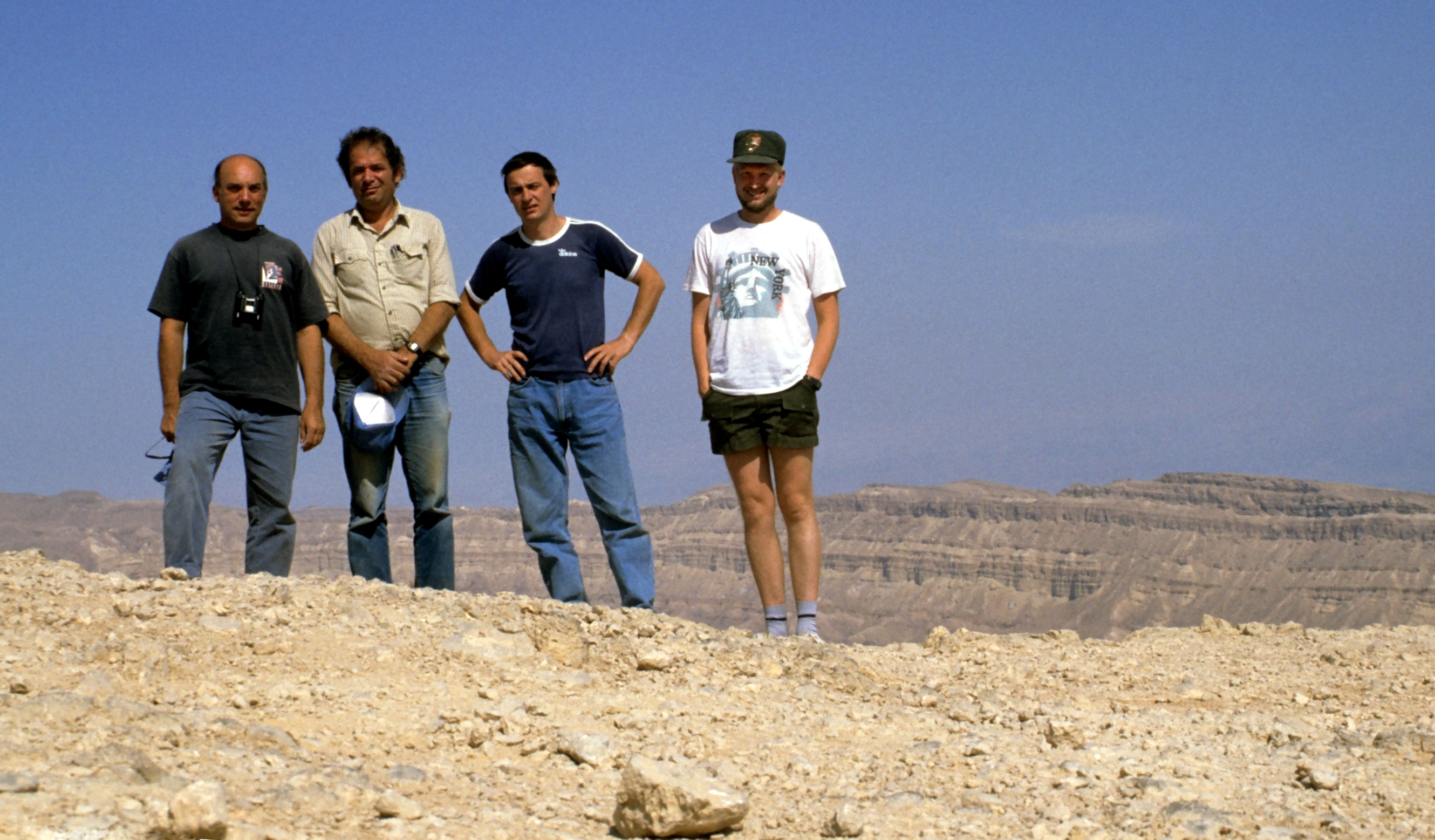
Negev, 1991

In 1963, he was assigned to the Institute of Geography of the USSR Academy of Sciences, starting work in the newly introduced position of research trainee..

In 1970, he defended his dissertation on "Structure and Productivity of High-Mountain Biogeocenoses of the Inner Tien Shan".

In 1976, he was Deputy Secretary-General of the 23rd session of the International Geographical Union Congress held in Moscow.

In 1979, he was the scientific secretary for the "Geography" and "Island Ecosystems" symposia at the 14th session of the Pacific Science Association Congress held in Khabarovsk.

He was one of the organizers of expeditions to the tropical islands of the Pacific Ocean on the research vessel "Kallisto", voyages in 1976–1977 and 1980. He is a member of the informal "Kallisto Club" (with Yuri P. Badenkov (expedition leader), Victor O. Targulyan, Yuri G. Puzyachenko, P. A. Kaplin, and Andrey A. Velichko).

He donated the collections of invertebrate animals and reptiles he gathered from the Tien Shan and tropical islands to the Zoological Museum of Moscow State University.

In 1983, he succeeded Yuri A. Isakov as head of the Biogeography Department at the Institute of Geography of the USSR Academy of Sciences. He actively supported the work of Natalia I. Bazilevich, organizing assistance for her from the laboratory staff. In 1991, the Biogeography Department split into two laboratories; Roman Isaevich remained head of one, and Arkady A. Tishkov headed the second. After R. I. Zlotin left the Institute in 1996, the laboratories were reunited, and the resulting unit retained its laboratory status.

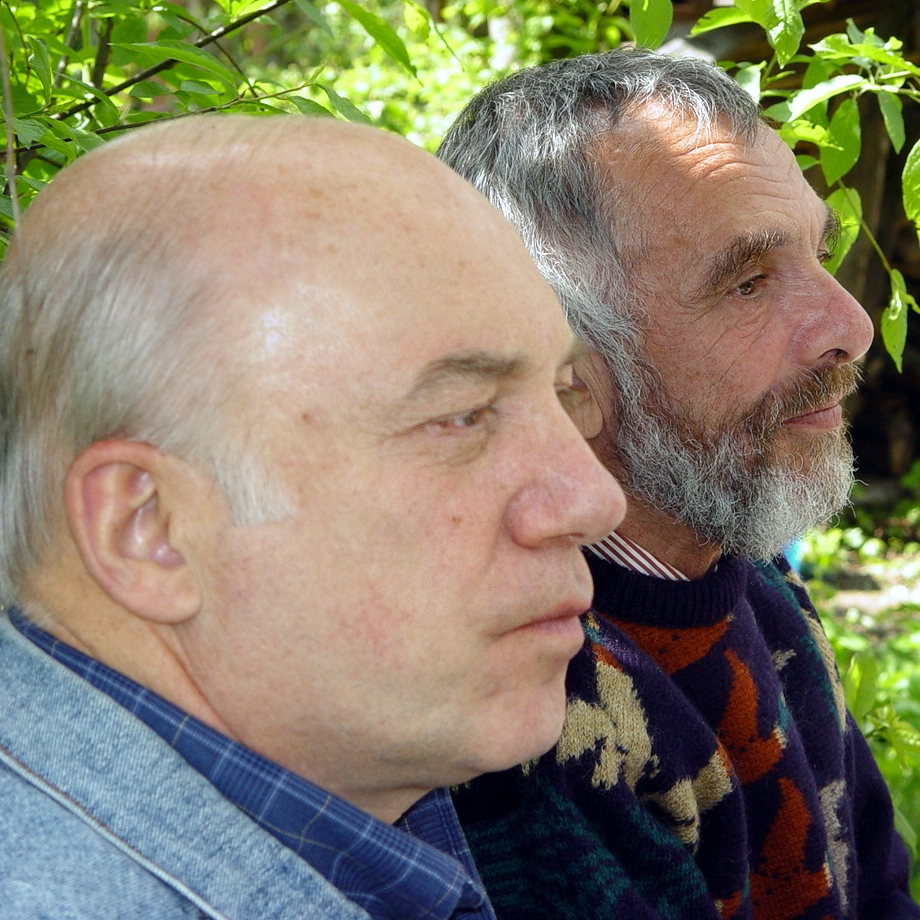
with Solomon L. Pereshkolnik Moscow Oblast, 2004

=== Professor and scientific work in the USA ===
From 1992 to 1993, he gave visiting lectures in the USA. He taught at the School of Public and Environmental Affairs, Department of Geography, Institute of Russia and Eastern Europe, Department of Central Eurasian Studies, Indiana University.

From 1997, he was a professor of geography at Indiana University Bloomington and biology at the University of New Mexico. He taught students in biogeography and ecology and conducted summer courses in experimental ecosystem ecology and biology.

Simultaneously, he conducted research in ecosystem ecology, regional geography, studied global climate change, and worked on nature conservation issues in the USA and Russia.

Main research topics:

- Long-term ecological research at field experimental sites in arctic, forest, steppe, desert, and alpine ecosystems.
- Expertise in ecological risk assessment and biodiversity conservation in areas of economic development.

In the spring of 2019, he retired but continued with science and consultations at Indiana University (professor emeritus).

He died on 26 February 2023 in Bloomington, Indiana, USA.

== Membership in organizations ==
- Russian Geographical Society (RGS)
- Moscow Society of Naturalists (MSNP)
- International Biological Program (IBP) (1972–1977)
- Man and the Biosphere Programme (MAB) (1980–1995)
- Ecological Society of America (ESA)
- Soil Ecology Society (SES) (USA)

== Bibliography ==
Author and editor of scientific books and articles on biogeography, including:

- Zlotin R.I., Flint V.E., Tishkov A.A., Panfilov D.V. In Memory of Yuri Andreevich Isakov (1912–1988). 2nd ed. (1989) // Russian Ornithological Journal. 2018. Volume 27. No. 1592. P. 1617–1622.
- Zlotin R.I., Parmenter R. R. Patterns of mast production in pinyon and juniper woodlands along a precipitation gradient in central New Mexico (Sevilleta NWR) // Journal of Arid Environments. 2008. P. 1562–1572.
- Zlotin R. I. Biodiversity and productivity of ecosystems // Physical Geography of Northern Eurasia: Russia and the Neighboring States. Cambridge: Cambridge University, 2002. P. 242–268.
- Zlotin R. I. Geography and organization of high mountain ecosystems in the former USSR // Ecosystems of the World. Vol. 3. Polar and Alpine Tundra. Amsterdam: Elsevier, 1997. P. 133–159.
- Bazilevich N.I., Drozdov A.V., Zlotin R.I. Geographical features of production and decomposition processes in the landscapes of Northern Eurasia // Izvestiya RAN. Seriya geograf. 1993. No. 4. P. 5-21.
- Zlotin R.I., Yasny E.V. Global degradation of biological diversity // Izvestiya RAN, Seriya geograficheskaya, 1992. No. 2. P. 76-88.
- Voropaev A.I., Zharikov S.N., Zlotin R.I. et al. Natural Environment of the European Part of the USSR. Moscow: Institute of Geography, USSR Academy of Sciences, 1989. 229 p.
- Kotlyakov V.M., Zlotin R.I. International cooperation of scientists // Izvestiya AN SSSR. Ser. geograf. 1989. No. 5.
- Bazilevich N.I., Zlotin R.I., Titlyanova A.A. Transformation of temperate grassland biogeocenoses under the influence of anthropogenic factors // Questions of Biogeocenosis Dynamics. Moscow: Institute of Geography, USSR Academy of Sciences, 1988. P. 28-59
- Veisman L.I., Zlotin R.I. The Northernmost Reserved Island Wrangel: Photo Album. Moscow: Sovetskaya Rossiya, 1986. 222 p.
- Bazilevich N.I., Zlotin R.I. [Ed.] Dynamics of Biota in Ecosystems of the Central Forest-Steppe. Moscow: Institute of Geography, USSR Academy of Sciences, 1986. 230 p.
- Eliseeva V.I., Zlotin R.I., Fedotov M.P. Twenty-year dynamics of nesting bird populations in a forest-steppe oak grove ecosystem // Dynamics of Biota in Ecosystems of the Central Forest-Steppe. Moscow: Publishing House of the Institute of Geography, USSR Academy of Sciences, 1986. P. 21-42.
- Zimina R.P., Zlotin R.I. The Role of Marmots in the Formation of Mountain Ecosystems of Central Asia. Frunze: Ilim, 1980. 107 p.
- Zlotin R.I., Pereshkolnik S.L. On the ecology of the green toad in the highlands of the Inner Tien Shan // Bulletin of MSNP. Department of Biology. 1977. No. 82. P. 67–74.
- Zlotin R.I. Life in the Highlands: A Study of the Organization of High-Mountain Ecosystems of the Tien Shan. Moscow: Mysl, 1975. 240 p.
- Zlotin R.I. [Ed.] The Role of Animals in the Functioning of Ecosystems: Proceedings of a Conference. Moscow: Nauka, 1975. 220 p.
- Zlotin R.I., Khodashova K.S. The Role of Animals in the Biological Cycle of Forest-Steppe Ecosystems. Moscow: Nauka, 1974. 220 p.
- Gerasimov I.P., Isakov Yu.A., Kirikov S.V., Nasimovich A.A., Zimina R.P., Panfilov D.V., Murzaev E.M., Richter G.D., Neyshtadt M.N., Khodasheva K.S., Zlotin R.I., Rakhilin V.K., Barykina V.V., Shubnikova O.N. Alexander Nikolaevich Formozov (1899–1973) // Izvestiya AN SSSR. Seriya geograficheskaya. 1974. No. 2. P. 158–160.
- Zlotin R.I. Materials on the trophic connections of birds in the syrts of the Tien Shan // Ornithology. 1968. No. 9.
- Zlotin R.I. Waterfowl of the Pokrovsky Syrts of the Tien Shan // Geography of Waterfowl Resources in the USSR. 1965. No. 2. P. 6-9.
- Zlotin R.I., Puzyachenko Yu.G. On the principles of typology of individual units of zoogeography // Vestnik Moskovskogo Universiteta, Ser. Geogr. 1964. No. 4. P. 235–241.
- Drozdov N.N., Zlotin R.I. On the geography of winter bird populations in the subalpine belt of the Central Caucasus // Ornithology. 1962. No. 5. P. 193–207.

== Film appearances ==
He appeared in Soviet popular science films, including:

- 1977 — "Kallisto" Goes to Suvorov Atoll. (Member of the Pacific Ocean expedition)
- 1988 — Where Do the Goitered Gazelles Go? (Biogeographer, member of the expedition to the Kyzyl-Kum)

== Literature ==
- Polunin N., Curme L. M. Zlotin Roman Isaevich // World who is who and Does what in Environment & Conservation. London: Earthscan, 1997. P. 336. (Environmentalism and politics; Vol. 4).
- Kovshar A. F. Zlotin Roman Isaevich // Ornithologists of Kazakhstan and Central Asia: 20th Century: Biographical Reference Guide. Almaty: Kompleks, 2003. P. 199.
