= Todorovsky =

Todorovsky (Russian: Тодоро́вский) is a surname. Notable people with the surname include:

- Pyotr Todorovsky (1925–2013), Soviet and Russian film director, screenwriter, cinematographer, actor, and film score composer
- Valery Todorovsky (born 1962), Soviet and Russian film director, screenwriter, and producer
- Pyotr Todorovsky Jr. (born 1986), Russian film director, screenwriter
