= Ruzil Minekaev =

Russian actor

- Tatar: Рузил Миңнекәев
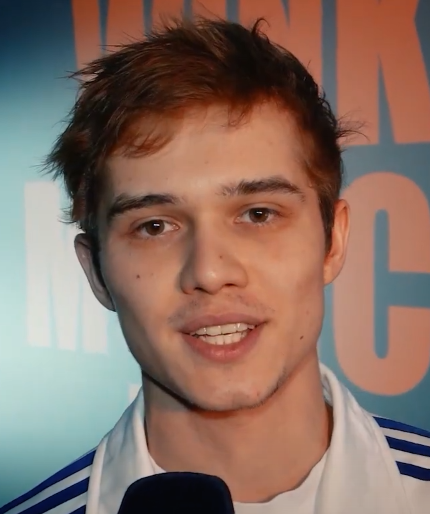
- Minekaev during an interview in February 2025
- Born: Ruzil Ramilevich Minekaev; May 20, 1999; Nurlat, Tatarstan, Russia
- Citizenship: Russian
- Occupation: Actor
- Years active: 2020–present

Ruzil Ramilevich Minekaev (Tatar: Рузил Рамил улы Миңнекәев; born May 20, 1999) is a Russian stage, film, and television actor. He is best known for his role as Marat in the television series The Boy's Word: Blood on the Asphalt, directed by Zhora Kryzhovnikov. From 2021 to 2023, he was an actor at the Moscow theatre School of Modern Play.

== Biography ==
Minekaev was born on May 20, 1999 in Nurlat, Republic of Tatarstan. He is ethnically Tatar. He has a twin sister named Ruzilya.

He studied at Secondary School No. 4 in Nurlat and from the age of 13 studied vocal performance at the local children's art school “Selet”.

After completing nine grades in 2015, he enrolled in the Kazan Theatre School, majoring in drama and film acting (course of Ildar Khairullin). During his studies, he appeared on stage in productions of The Curious Case of Benjamin Button and Comedy No. 13.

In 2019, Minekaev entered the acting group of the directing faculty at the Russian Institute of Theatre Arts, studying in the workshop of Joseph Raihelgauz. He graduated in February 2024.

Since 2020, Minekaev has appeared in film and television, including the series Street Justice, Partners, and Smychok. From 2021 to 2023, he worked at the School of Modern Play theatre but left due to increased involvement in film projects.

In 2023, Minekaev gained nationwide recognition for his role as Marat in The Boy's Word: Blood on the Asphalt. Critics praised his performance, with KinoPoisk naming him one of the series’ major discoveries.

In 2024, he was included in The Blueprint 100 list of the most promising figures in the creative industries.

== Personal life ==
Minekaev is married to actress Aziza Bekmanova, whom he met while studying at theatre school and later at GITIS. They have a son named Remil.

== Filmography ==
=== Film ===
Year	Title	Role	Notes
2024	Yolki 11	Damir	
2025	Yolki 12	Damir	
2026	Buratino	Harlequin	
TBA	Buratino 2	Harlequin	

=== Television ===
Year	Title	Role	Notes
2020–2021	Street Justice	Gnome	
2022	Smychok	Max	
2022–present	Partners	Kostya	
2023	The Boy's Word: Blood on the Asphalt	Marat Suvorov	
2025	Overheard in Rybinsk	Sasha Shirmanov	
2025	Moscow Does Not Believe in Tears: The Beginning	Matvey	

== Awards ==
- 2024 — Best Actor in a Television Series, Association of Film and Television Producers Awards
