= Yolki 11 =

- Directed by: Egor Chichkanov; Aleksandr Karpilovskiy; Aleksandr Kott; Sergey Trofimov
- Written by: Pyotr Vnukov
- Produced by: Timur Asadov; Ara Khachatryan; Lala Rustamova
- Starring: Dmitry Nagiyev; Ruzil Minekaev; Mariya Raskina; Kristina Babushkina; Burak Özçivit; Mikhail Trukhin; Anton Vasilyev; Irina Pegova
- Cinematography: Sergey Trofimov; Pyotr Dukhovsky; Valery Makhmudov; Duglas Machabeli
- Production companies: Bazelevs; Okko
- Release date: December 19, 2024 (Russia)
- Country: Russia
- Language: Russian

Yolki 11 is a Russian comedy film directed by Egor Chichkanov, Aleksandr Karpilovsky, Aleksandr Kott and Sergey Trofimov. It stars Dmitry Nagiyev, Ruzil Minekaev and Mariya Raskina. This film was theatrically released on December 19, 2024.

== Plot ==
The film shows people from different parts of Russia, whose fates are unexpectedly intertwined for the sake of congratulating a single teacher named Valentina Mikhailovna. The heroes will understand something very important and make a correct choice for entering the New Year with new hopes.

== Cast ==
- Dmitry Nagiyev as Yura
- Ruzil Minekaev as Damir Soktoyev
- Mariya Raskina as Zolushka
- Kristina Babushkina
- Burak Özçivit
- Mikhail Trukhin
- Anton Vasilyev
- Irina Pegova
