= Overheard in Rybinsk =

- Genre: Ironic thriller
- Created by: Ivan Baranov
- Written by: Ivan Baranov; Pyotr Todorovsky Jr.
- Directed by: Pyotr Todorovsky Jr.
- Starring: Timofey Tribuntsev; Ruzil Minekaev; Anton Vasilyev; Yuliya Khlynina; Mikhail Kremer
- Country of origin: Russia
- Original language: Russian
- No. of seasons: 1
- No. of episodes: 8

Production
- Executive producer: Darya Gradoboeva
- Producers: Ivan Golomovzyuk; Makar Kozhukhov; Marina Kataya; Elena Torchinskaya; Vladimir Shaposhnikov
- Production locations: Rybinsk, Russia
- Cinematography: Robert Sarukhanyan
- Running time: 48 minutes
- Production company: 1-2-3 Production

Original release
- Network: Premier; Start; NTV
- Release: 30 January 2025 – present

Overheard in Rybinsk (Russian: Подслу́шано в Ры́бинске, romanized: Podslushano v Rybinske) is a Russian television series produced by 1-2-3 Production in the genre of an ironic thriller. The series stars Timofey Tribuntsev, Ruzil Minekaev, Anton Vasilyev, Yulia Khlynina, and Mikhail Kremer.

The series premiered on the streaming platforms Premier and Start on January 30, 2025. On March 14, 2025, Premier announced that the series had been renewed for a second season, with the setting to change to a different city.

== Plot ==
The story centers on Yura Maltsev, a journalist for a small provincial newspaper who has spent his entire life writing mundane news about his hometown. Suddenly, Yura begins experiencing epileptic seizures during which he sees visions predicting murders that will secretly take place in Rybinsk. The situation becomes more complicated when Yura himself becomes the main suspect in one of the cases.

== Cast ==
- Timofey Tribuntsev as Yuri Nikolayevich Maltsev, a provincial newspaper journalist
- Ruzil Minekaev as Sasha Shirmanov (Shirmik), a local young man from Rybinsk
- Anton Vasilyev as Konstantin Sergeyevich Lukyanov, a local television host
- Yulia Khlynina as Zoya Grigoryeva, police captain
- Mikhail Kremer as Yegor Bayanov (Bayan), police captain
- Varvara Volodina as Tanya, Yura's daughter
- Svetlana Kolpakova as Yulia, Yura's wife
- Sergey Belyaev as Oleg Viktorovich Vasilyev, head of the Rybinsk police department
- Anatoly Kot as Georgy Markovich Shcherbakov, businessman and mayoral candidate
- Sergey Kozik as a fisherman murdered by Kostya
- Yekaterina Channova as Vika Bochkaryova, a student murdered by Kostya
- Irina Kryuchkova as Masha Volkova, an actress and Shirmik's friend
- Sergey Dyakov as Puzyr, Shirmik's friend
- Grigory Kalinin as Boris Kokin, a theater director
- Aleksey Kolubkov as Leonid Yevgenyevich, editor-in-chief of Volzhsky Vestnik
- Anton Afanasyev as a psychiatrist

== Episodes ==
=== Season 1 (2025) ===
| No. | Title | Original air date |
|---|---|---|
| 1 | "Not Rio de Janeiro" | January 30, 2025 |
| 2 | "The Fisherman's Word" | January 30, 2025 |
| 3 | "Enough Lies" | February 6, 2025 |
| 4 | "Tourists from Mooooscow" | February 13, 2025 |
| 5 | "Black Raven" | February 20, 2025 |
| 6 | "In the Moonlight" | February 27, 2025 |
| 7 | "Smog Chokes the Palms" | March 6, 2025 |
| 8 | "I Don’t Eat Meat" | March 13, 2025 |

== Production ==
The concept of the series was proposed by creative producer and screenwriter Ivan Baranov, who grew up in Rybinsk and was deeply familiar with the city.

Filming began on November 17, 2023, in Rybinsk, Yaroslavl Oblast. Some scenes were filmed along the Volga River and the Rybinsk Reservoir. Filming wrapped on February 13, 2024.

The series was presented at the New Season online cinema festival in September 2024.

The television premiere aired on NTV on December 8, 2025.

== Reception ==
The first season became a major hit within six weeks, ranking first among all original Premier series by total viewers. According to the platform, the premiere was Premier's strongest launch in the previous two years, accumulating around three million views after the first three episodes. The series also received a 100% positive rating from Russian film critics on the Kinopoisk review aggregator.
