= Pyotr Vtorov =

Russian biogeographer

Pyotr Petrovich Vtorov
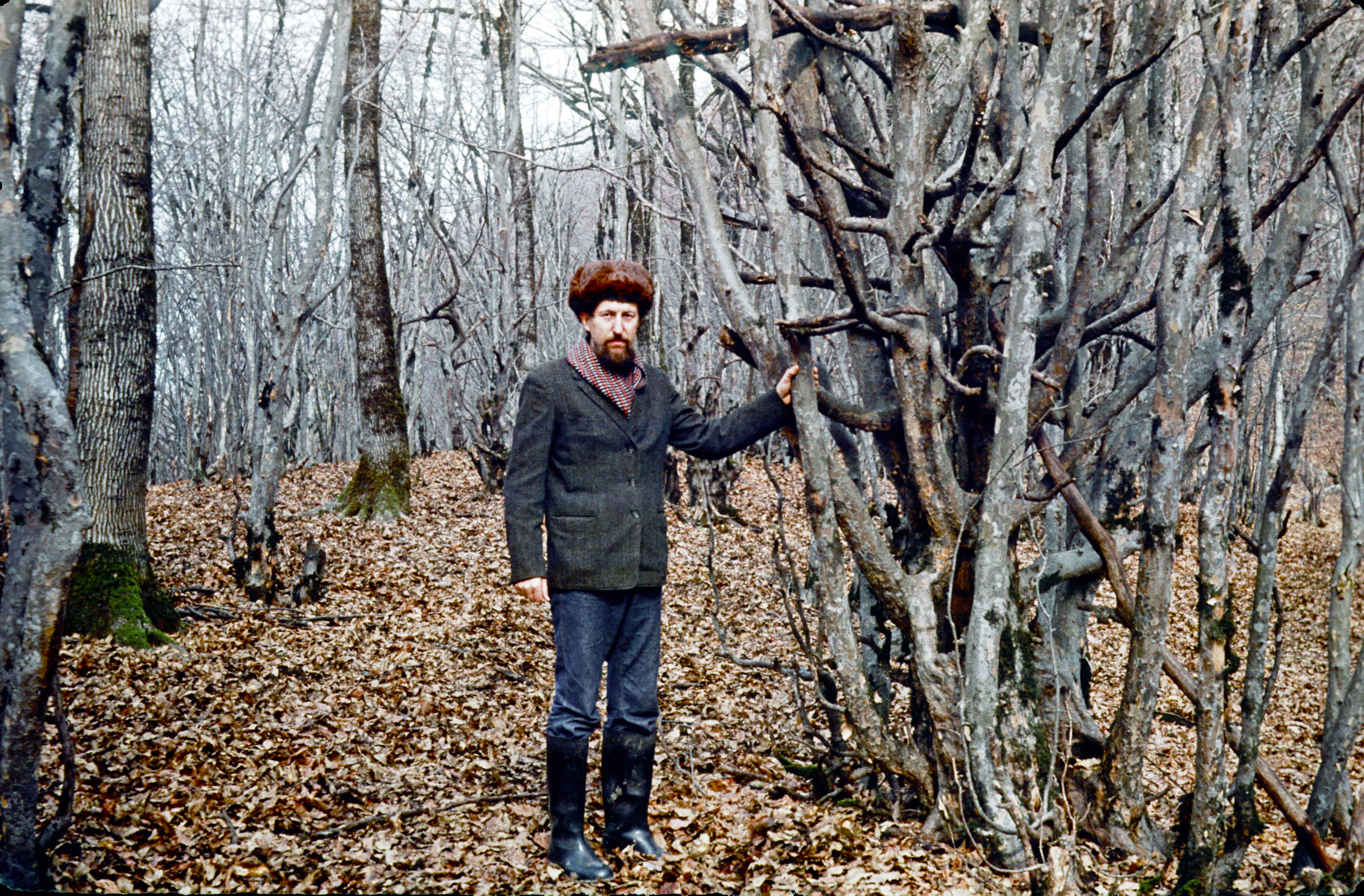
- Born: 1 August 1938; Moscow, USSR
- Died: 5 January 1979 (aged 40); Moscow, USSR
- Education: Moscow State University
- Known for: Synthetic Biogeography
- Scientific career
- Fields: Biogeography, Zoology
- Workplaces: Central Research Laboratory for Nature Conservation

Pyotr Petrovich Vtorov (Russian: Пётр Петро́вич Вто́ров; 1938–1979) was a Soviet scientist biogeographer, ecologist, zoologist and nature conservation activist. He founded a new direction of scientific research called Synthetic Biogeography, and developed a scientific concept for the creation of reference areas of the biosphere. He was an author of textbooks, a guide to birds, scientific and popular books.

== Biography ==
Born on August 1, 1938, in a family of architects of Stalin's high-rises in Moscow.

During the Great Patriotic War, he was evacuated to the city of Kuibyshev (now Samara). After returning, the house in Moscow was destroyed by a bomb and the family moved to their aunt in the village of Malakhovka near Moscow.

Since 1952 he actively attended the Club of Young Biologists of the State Darwin Museum. In 1955 he graduated from high school, and was winner of the Moscow Biology Olympiad.

In 1959, from the 3rd year of the Moscow State Pedagogical Institute, he was transferred to the second year of the Geography Faculty of the Moscow State University. Then he worked 8 years in field research in the Tien Shan, he published dozens of papers and several scientific monographs in biogeography and biogeophysics. In 1967 he received PhD in biological sciences under the guidance of Professor A. P. Kuzyakin. At the Tien Shan Physico-Geographical Station, he founded and headed the department of biogeography and wrote a number of monographs. In 1968 he developed a research program for the study of energy, chemical and information interactions in terrestrial ecological systems of various types.

In 1971, he returned to Moscow with his family and went to work as a senior researcher at the Central Scientific Research Laboratory for Nature Conservation.

He continued systematic field research using his own methods already throughout Soviet Central Asia.

Pyotr Vtorov collaborated with more than 30 scientists, taxonomists, who, using the materials he collected, described several dozen species of invertebrates that were new to science. Some of them were named after him:

- Collembola: Cryptopygus vtorovi, Martynova, 1978, Drepanura vtorovi, Martynova, 1970, Folsomia vtorovi, Martynova, 1971, Friesea vtorovi, Tshelnokov, 1977, Onychiurus vtorovi, Martynova, 1976, Parisotoma vtorovi, Martynova, 1977
- Pseudoscorpionida, Dactylochelifer vtorovi, Mahnert, 1977.
- Oribatida: Cultoribatula vtorovi, Krivolutsky, 1971, Furcoppia vtorovi, Krivolutsky, 1971, Oxyoppia vtorovi, Rjabinin, 1987
- Diptera, Campsicnemus vtorovi, Negrobov & Zlobin, 1978, Cheilosia vtorovi, Peck, 1969

=== Popularization of science ===
Vtorov independently learned English, Kyrgyz, French, German, Spanish, Portuguese, Polish and Czech. He actively translated and reviewed world literature in the Soviet Abstracts Journals. In 1969, he and his colleagues wrote a Russian-Kyrgyz phrasebook.

In 1978, according to the new Soviet School Program, a textbook for students of pedagogical institutes Biogeography was published. He proposed a new term Biofilotа.

In 1980, another textbook for students and teachers was published, in which P. Vtorov showed his long-standing passion for ornithology Identifier of birds of the USSR fauna. The book was illustrated by the ornithologist and artist Yu. V. Kostin.

Some of his textbooks with Nikolay Drozdov were translated from Russian:

- Bulgarian: Второв П. П., Дроздов М. М. Биогеография на континентите. София: Нар. просвета, 1978. 288 с.
- Polish: Wtorov P. P., Drozdow N. N. Biogeografia kontinentow. Warszawa: Panst. Wyd. Nauk, 1981. 284 p.; Wydanie II. 1988.
- Romanian: Второв П. П., Дроздов Н. Н. Бюгеографк. Кшв.: Вища школа, 1982. 240 с.
- Ukrainian: Второв П. П., Дроздов М. М. Біогеографія. Київ: Вища школа, 1987.

In 1970 Vtorov repeatedly appeared on the Soviet TV show In the World of Animals.

=== Nature Conservation ===
Since 1971, Pyotr Vtorov worked in the USSR's only Central Scientific Research Laboratory for Nature Conservation of the Ministry of Agriculture of the USSR. He took part in the creation of the first Red Data Book of the USSR. He studied the nature of protected areas and scientifically substantiated the creation of reference areas of the biosphere. Developed a program for cenotic and ecosystem inventory of protected areas. He worked on problems of community protection, ecosystem protection, biosphere inventory and appraisal.

In 1975 Vtorov prepared and join the Soviet delegation at the 12 General Assembly of the International Union for Conservation of Nature and Natural Resources (IUCN) in Kinshasa (Zaire). As part of the Soviet delegation, he met with President Mabutu. Was elected as a member of the IUCN Commission. Visited the eastern part of Zaire, and the national parks Virunga and Kahuzi-Bega. For the first time a group of zoologists from the USSR was able to see in nature, photograph and describe mountain or eastern gorillas.

In 1976 Vtorov studied the organization of nature conservation in Sweden (Swedish Environmental Protection Agency).

In 1978 he took part in the preparation and holding of the 14th General Assembly of the IUCN (Ashgabat. September 25 - October 5, 1978). This jubilee Assembly, timed to coincide with the 30th anniversary of the IUCN, brought together leading scientists and conservationists from around the world.

On October 16, 1978, he successfully defended his doctoral dissertation at the Faculty of Geography of Moscow State University.

On October 19 he was admitted to the Botkin hospital with a diagnosis of a blast crisis (the terminal stage of chronic myelogenous leukemia). He died on January 5, 1979, in this hospital. He was buried at the Nikolo-Arkhangelsk cemetery in Moscow.
