= Intensive Care (2022 film) =

- Directed by: Pyotr Todorovsky Jr.
- Written by: Pyotr Todorovsky Jr.
- Produced by: Valery Fedorovich; Yevgeny Nikishov; Ivan Golomovzyuk; Anna Gudkova; Yelena Torchinskaya
- Starring: Nikita Yefremov; Irina Starshenbaum
- Cinematography: Gleb Filatov; Aleksey Surkov
- Edited by: Aleksandra Koroleva
- Music by: Yelena Stroganova; Fyodor Zhuravlyov
- Production companies: 1-2-3 Production; Place of Power
- Distributed by: KaroRental
- Release dates: 2022 (Moscow International Film Festival); March 2, 2023 (Russia)
- Running time: 101 minutes
- Country: Russia
- Language: Russian
- Budget: ₽58.5 million

Intensive Care (Russian: Здоровый человек, romanized: Zdorovyy chelovek) is a 2022 Russian drama film written and directed by Pyotr Todorovsky Jr. about moral anxiety with Nikita Yefremov and Irina Starshenbaum.

This film was theatrically released on March 2, 2023.

== Plot ==
A sports news anchor named Egor Pogodin starts helping mothers of sick children and looking for people who have suddenly disappeared, but as a result, he loses his job and conflicts with his wife.

== Cast ==
- Nikita Yefremov as Egor Pogodin, sportscaster
- Irina Starshenbaum as Maya Pogodina, Egor's wife and colleague
- Polina Ainutdinova as Marusya Pogodina, Egor's daughter
- Oleg Chugunov as Alyosha Komarov, a patient in a children's hospital
- Mariya Shashlova as Alyosha's mother
- Masha Lobanova as Kristina Krapivina, Alyosha's classmate
- Darya Balabanova as Tanya, a volunteer
- Evgeniy Tkachuk as Boris, Egor and Maya's boss
- Aleksandr Mikhaylov as Efimov
- Ilya Iosifov as Mikhail, a guest at the birthday party
