= In the World of Animals =

1968 Russian television series

- Shot from the TV screen (1974—2009)
- Genre: Popular science broadcast
- Created by: Alexander Zguridi
- Starring: Alexander Zguridi; Vasily Peskov; Nikolay Drozdov
- Theme music composer: Ariel Ramirez
- Countries of origin: Soviet Union; Russia
- Original language: Russian
- No. of seasons: 48
- No. of episodes: 1318

Production
- Executive producer: Irina Lapina
- Production location: Moscow
- Running time: 27 min

Original release
- Network: Channel One Russia; Russia 1 Domashny; Russia-2; Carousel
- Release: 1968 – present

In the World of Animals (Russian: В мире животных, romanized: V mire zhivotnykh) is a Soviet and Russian television program dedicated to zoology and wildlife research, especially the habits and habitat of animals.

It began airing in 1968.

In the early 1970s, the show started with a composition by Paul Mauriat Orchestra Colombe Ivre, with giraffe and rhino depicted in the main titles.

In 1974, the title sequence depicted a flying monkey, running under the ostriches, with the music of Ariel Ramirez's La peregrinación (Pilgrimage) from the Christmas cantata Our Christmas, also in adaptation by Paul Mauriat Orchestra. This screensaver lasted until 2009.

The program was the winner of the TEFI prize in 1996 for Best journalistic program.

== List of hosts ==
- 1968–1975: Alexander Zguridi
- 1975–1990: Vasily Peskov (turns with Nikolay Drozdov in 1977)
- 1977–present: Nikolay Drozdov
