= Nikolay Drozdov =

Russian naturalist and broadcaster

- Николай Дроздов
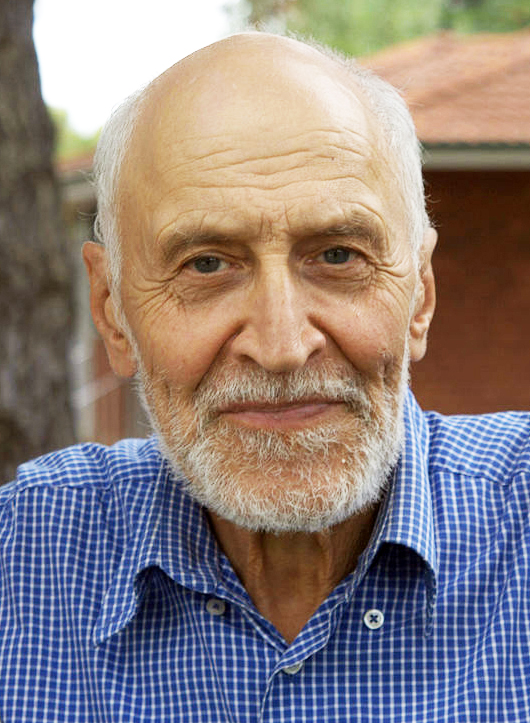
- Drozdov in 2011
- Born: 20 June 1937 (age 89); Moscow, Russian SFSR, Soviet Union
- Education: Moscow State University (geography)
- Occupations: broadcaster; naturalist; biological sciences; scientific zoology; geographical sciences; voice actor
- Title: Professor
- Spouse: Tanya Petrovna
- Children: 2
- Awards: Kalinga Prize (1994); UNESCO Albert Einstein medal (gold)

Nikolay Nikolaevich Drozdov (Russian: Николай Николаевич Дроздов; born 20 June 1937) is a Russian doctor of biological sciences, candidate of geographical sciences, zoological sciences, professor of Moscow State University, a public figure, member of the expert council of the national award "Crystal Compass", a member of the media council of the Russian Geographical Society.

Drozdov has worked on the Russian show In the World of Animals for over 50 years beginning in 1968. He served as a commentator, and then in 1977 became a writer on the show and an anchor. He is a recipient of The Golden Orpheus TV award. In the World of Animals won the TEFI award as the best popular scientific program in 1995. Drozdov was elected to the Russian TV Academy in 1996. Drozdov is a recipient of the Kalinga Prize as well as the UNESCO Albert Einstein medal (gold). He has written 20 books and numerous articles, and is an ecology adviser to the UN Secretary General.

== Biography ==
Nikolay Nikolaevich was born in Moscow, into a family of scientists. His father, Nikolay Sergeevich Drozdov (1902—1963), was Professor of Organic Chemistry at the 2nd Moscow State Medical Institute. His mother, Nadezhda Pavlovna Dreyling (1906—1993), was a physician at the 5th city hospital in Moscow and was assistant to academician P. E. Lukomskiy. The great-grandfather on the mother's side is Ivan Romanovich von Dreyling, from an old Tyrolean and then, a Russian noble family. He was a cuirassier officer, at the age of 17 he participated in the Battle of Borodino, was an orderly of the Field Marshal Mikhail Kutuzov, and then, went to Paris and participated in the battles, was awarded the Order of St. Anna of II degree and St. Vladimir of IV degree with a bow, kept a detailed diary of combat actions, stored in manuscript in the Historical Museum and published in the book “1812. Memories of the soldiers of the Russian army. While studying at school, he worked as a herdsman at the stud farm in the Rybnovsky District of Ryazan Oblast. After school, he entered the Faculty of Biology of the Moscow State University, where he became a friend of Vladimir Pozner. After leaving the second year of biology of the Moscow State University, he worked at a garment factory, first as a student, and then went to the master of the seventh category for sewing men's outerwear.

In 1952–1955, he actively participated in the work of the biology club of All-Russian Society for the Protection of Nature (VOOP) under the leadership of Pyotr Smolin. Together with Boris Vilenkin, Pyotr Vtorov, Yuri Puzachenko, Olga Shokhina, Mikhail Chernyakhovsky, Leonid Lisovenko and Roman Zlotin, they became prominent representatives of the second generation of VOOP.

In 1956-1957, he studied at the Faculty of Science of the Moscow City Pedagogical Institute of V.P. Potemkin. After the second year, he moved to the MSU Faculty of Geography. In 1963, he graduated from the Department of Biogeography of the Faculty of Geography of Moscow State University, and by 1966 pursued his prost-graduation education.

=== Scientific and social work ===
In 1968, he defended his postgraduation education thesis on the topic "Cultural landscapes of the arid regions of the USSR and their avifauna". Since then, he is working at the Department of Biogeography of the MSU Faculty of Geography - first junior, then senior research associate, since 1979 - associate professor, and since 2017 as professor. He has read courses in ecology, ornithology, nature conservation, world biogeography; he constantly gives lectures.

In 1968, for the first time he appeared in the popular television show "In the world of animals", A. G. Bannikov introduced him to the show host, A. M. Zguridi. Later he was a scientific consultant of the movies about animals “Black Mountain”, “Riki-Tiki-Tavi”, etc. Since 1977, he became the host of this program.

In 1971-1972, he passed a 10-month scientific internship at the Faculty of Zoology of the Australian National University (Canberra, Australia). Traveled to many areas of Australia and described this journey in the book "Flight of the boomerang."

In 1975, he worked as part of the Soviet delegation at the XII General Assembly of the International Union for Conservation of Nature in the city of Kinshasa (Zaire). Elected member of the IUCN National park Commission. Visited the eastern part of Zaire and the national parks of Virunga and Kahuzi-Biega. For the first time, a group of USSR zoologists saw mountain or Eastern gorilla in the natural environment. The photos and trip report were published in the Природа Nature magazine. In the same 1975, after visiting India, Drozdov became a vegetarian.

He participated in numerous scientific expeditions on the territory of the USSR (to Kamchatka Peninsula, the Far East, the Kuril Islands, the Pamir Mountains, the Tian Shan, the Karakum Desert). In 1979, he climbed to the top of Mount Elbrus. In 1980, he participated in a 4-month expedition on the research ship of the Academy of Sciences of the Soviet Union Callisto on the islands of Fiji, Tonga and Samoa, within the framework of the national project "Ecosystem" of the Academy of Sciences of the Soviet Union, on the topic "Protection and rational use of island ecosystems." In 1993 and 1995, he participated in the expeditions of the Russian icebreaker Yamal (to the North Pole and on the Northern Sea Route) and on the ship "Discoverer" (along the coast of Alaska and Canada). Since 1996, he was a member of the High Advisory Council on Sustainable Development under the United Nations Secretary-General. In 2002, as part of the International Expedition, made a landing on the North Pole and spent a week in the ice camp Barneo. In the same year, a member of the expert council of the national award "Crystal Compass". In 2000, in Petrozavodsk city, he defended his PhD thesis in Biological Sciences (having no dissertation text, based on several works) on the topic “Fauna, animal population and protection of biological diversity in arid regions of the Earth”. In 2014, he was elected to the Civic Chamber of the Russian Federation of the 5th legislature (by 2017). He is a member of Public Council of the International Public Movement "We love Russia".

=== Religious belief ===
Nikolay Nikolaevich Drozdov is a Christian who follows traditional Orthodox values. He adheres to Christian principles, emphasizing harmony with nature and spiritual growth.

=== Social stances ===
In 2010, he supported a protest against deforestation of protected forest in the Khimki Forest.

In 2012, he supported organizations and individuals promoting nature conservation.

As of the early 2010s, he maintained a close relationship with Patriarch Kirill of Moscow, the head of the Russian Orthodox Church.

In 2014, he advocated for the animals defense and for preservation of their habitat. For many years, he fruitfully cooperates with the national and international environmental organizations.

Drozdov has approved of the 2014 Russian annexation of Crimea.

=== Broadcasting jobs ===
In 1977—2019 - the host of the TV program "In the world of animals".

In 1996, he was elected the member of the Academy of Russian Television. In the same year, the program “In the animal world” was awarded the “TEFI” award as the “Best Educational Program”. Author and co-author of many documentaries and videos about nature and animals: the series “By the pages of the Red Book”, “Rare animals”, “Standards of the biosphere” (ordered by UNESCO) and the others.

In the early and mid-2000s, he translated and voiced BBC documentaries the “Wildlife”. The largest work is the 6-episode documentary Realms of the ”Russian Bear” (1988–1992), developed jointly with the natural history department of the BBC.

He was repeatedly a member of the jury of the Pop scientific film and television festivals about animals and the nature of Great Britain and Italy.

In 2003 and 2004, he took part in the reality show “Last Hero” (fourth and fifth editions). Participated in the special edition of the "What? Where? When?" program dated April 1, 2005 (on the 10th anniversary of the first broadcast at the Channel One Russia) as part of the team of hosts of those years, as well as in the KVN (in the second semi-final of the Higher League, in the fall of 2014).

In 2005, he starred together with Nikas Safronov in the reality TV show "Rublevka. Live" (NTV).

In 2008, he was the host of the program “In the world of people” at the Channel One Russia, but it did not last long, but caused a lot of negative emotions and criticism.

In 2014, he led the program “The Alphabet of the Forest” on the “Children's Radio”, in which he read N. Sladkov's stories about nature.

== Health ==
In January 2023, he broke eight ribs and ended up in intensive care in one of the hospitals in Moscow.
