= Pyotr Todorovsky Jr. =

Russian film director, screenwriter and cinematographer

Pyotr Todorovsky
- Born: 6 December 1986 (age 39); Moscow
- Citizenship: Russia
- Occupations: Film director, screenwriter
- Years active: 2012 — present

Pyotr Todorovsky Jr. (Russian: Пётр Валерьевич Тодоро́вский) is a Russian film director and screenwriter, son of Valery Todorovsky and grandson of Pyotr Todorovsky and Viktoriya Tokareva.

Todorovsky Jr. is an alumnus of High Courses for Scriptwriters and Film Directors.

His TV series The Flight won the main prize at Ser!alK!ller 2020 in Brno.

As of 2023, he worked on a detective TV series written by Ivan Baranov. The series premiered in 2025 under the title Overheard in Rybinsk.

== Selected filmography ==
=== Screenwriter ===
- 2016 — The Day Before, directed by Alexander Kott;
- 2021 — Obitel, directed by Alexander Veledinsky.

=== Director ===
- 2019 — The Flight TV Series;
- 2022 — Lovestory;
- 2022 — Intensive Care;
- 2025 — Overheard in Rybinsk.
