= List of Russian films of 2018 =

A list of films produced in Russia in 2018 (see 2018 in film).

== Film releases ==
Opening	Title	Russian title	Director	Cast	Details
January 18	The Bottomless Bag	Мешок без дна	Rustam Khamdamov	Svetlana Nemolyaeva, Sergey Koltakov	
January 18	The Scythian	Скиф	Rustam Mosafir	Aleksey Faddeev, Aleksandr Kuznetsov, Vitaly Kravchenko, Aleksandr Patsevich	Official website
February 1	Selfie	Селфи	Nikolay Khomeriki	Konstantin Khabensky, Feodor Bondarchuk	
February 14	Ice	Лёд	Oleg Trofim	Aglaya Tarasova, Alexander Petrov, Miloš Biković, Mariya Aronova, Yan Tsapnik	Walt Disney Studios Sony Pictures Releasing (WDSSPR)
February 22	Frontier	Рубеж	Dmitriy Tyurin	Pavel Priluchny, Stanislav Duzhnikov, Aleksndr Korshunov, Semyon Treskunov	
February 22	What Men Talk About. Continuation	О чём говорят мужчины. Продолжение	Flyuza Farkhshatova	Leonid Barats	
March 1	Beyond the Edge	За гранью реальности	Aleksandr Boguslavskiy	Milos Bikovic, Antonio Banderas, Lyubov Aksyonova, Evgeniy Stychkin	
March 1	Buy Me	Купи меня	Vadim Perelman	Svetlana Ustinova, Yulia Khlynina, Anna Adamovich	
March 1	Dovlatov	Довлатов	Aleksei German	Milan Marić, Danila Kozlovsky, Anton Shagin, Elena Lyadova	Walt Disney Studios Sony Pictures Releasing (WDSSPR) / Netflix; Berlinale
March 1	Beyond the Summit, aka King of the Mountain	Со дна вершины	Yana Polarush, Konstantin Kutuev	Pavel Shevando, Vladimir Vdovichenkov, Kseniya Kuznetsova, Natalia Berger, Konstantin Beloshapka	Central Partnership; Screened at many festivals, including SOSE International Film Festival, and won prizes at several, including for best film
March 8	I Am Losing Weight	Я худею	Aleksey Nuzhnyy	Aleksandra Bortich, Irina Gorbacheva, Yevgeny Kulik, Roman Kurtsyn, Yelena Valyushkina	Universal Pictures International (UPI)
March 15	Once Upon a Time	Жили-были	Eduard Parri	Fyodor Dobronravov	

Opening	Title	Russian title	Director	Cast	Details
April 5	Gogol. Viy	Гоголь. Вий	Egor Baranov	Alexander Petrov, Evgeniy Stychkin, Artyom Tkachenko	
April 19	Coach	Тренер	Danila Kozlovsky	Danila Kozlovsky, Olga Zueva, Irina Gorbacheva, Rostislav Bershauer, Vladimir Ilyin	Central Partnership
April 26	Kikoriki. Deja Vu	Смешарики. Дежавю	Denis Chernov	Anton Vinogradov, Vadim Bochanov, Vladimir Postnikov	
April 26	Tanks	Танки	Kim Druzhinin	Andrey Merzlikin, Aglaya Tarasova, Aleksandr Tyutin, Sergey Stukalov	Other examples include Panfilov's 28 Men, 2016 (also directed by Kim Druzhinin).
May 3	Sobibor	Собибор	Konstantin Khabensky	Konstantin Khabensky, Christopher Lambert	
May 25	A Rough Draft	Черновик	Sergey Mokritskiy	Nikita Volkov, Yevgeny Tkachuk, Olga Borovskaya, Yulia Peresild	
June 6	Russian Demon	Русский бес	Grigory Konstantinopolsky	Ivan Makarevich, Grigory Konstantinopolsky, Lyubov Aksyonova	
June 7	First	Первые	Rustam Mosafir	Yevgeny Tkachuk, Alina Lanina, Valery Barinov	
June 7	Leto	Лето	Kirill Serebrennikov	Roman Bilyk, Teo Yoo, Irina Starshenbaum, Filipp Avdeyev	
	Night Shift	Ночная смена	Maryus Vaysberg	Vladimir Yaglych, Pavel Derevyanko, Ksenia Teplova, Natalia Bardo	
	We Will Not Say Goodbye	Прощаться не будем	Pavel Drozdov	Andrey Merzlikin, Egor Beroev, Anna Churina, Ksenia Petrukhina	

Opening	Title	Russian title	Director	Cast	Details
July 19	Unforgiven	Непрощённый	Sarik Andreasyan	Dmitry Nagiev, Roza Khairullina, Mikhail Gorevoy	
August 30	Gogol. Terrible Revenge	Гоголь. Страшная месть	Egor Baranov	Alexander Petrov, Oleg Menshikov, Yevgeny Stychkin	
September 6	Story of One Appointment	История одного назначения	Dunya Smirnova	Aleksey Smirnov, Yevgeniy Kharitonov, Irina Gorbacheva	
September 13	Temporary difficulties	Временные трудности	Mikhail Raskhodnikov	Rinal Mukhametov, Ivan Okhlobystin, Viktoriya Solovyeva	
September 27	Core of the World	Сердце мира	Natalya Meshchaninova	Stepan Devonin, Dmitriy Podnozov, Yana Sekste	

Opening	Title	Russian title	Director	Cast	Details
October 4	Acid	Кислота	Alexander Gorchilin	Filipp Avdeyev, Aleksandr Kuznetsov, Aleksandra Rebenok	
October 4	In the Hood	На районе	Olga Zueva	Danila Kozlovsky, Ilya Malanin, Elena Obolenskaya	
October 11	Hoffmaniada	Гофманиада	Stanislav Sokolov	Vladimir Koshevoy, Slava Polunin, Natalya Fisson, Anvar Libabov	An epic stop-motion film from Soyzumultfilm, the first since 1985 and the last produced at the historical studio in 25 Dolgorukovskaya Street, near the Novoslobodskaya metro station, Moscow. Hoffmaniada on YouTube (in English)
October 11	The Perfect Ones	Без меня	Kirill Pletnyov	Lyubov Aksyonova, Polina Maksimova, Rinal Mukhametov, Kirill Pletnyov	
October 18	Elephants Can Play Football	Слоны могут играть в футбол	Mikhail Segal	Vladimir Mishukov, Sofya Gershevich, Varvara Pakhomova, Sasha Bystrzhitskaya	
October 25	Tankers	Несокрушимый	Konstantin Maksimov	Andrey Chernyshov, Vladimir Epifantsev, Oleg Fomin, Olga Pogodina	20th Century Fox CIS
November 1	The Crimean Bridge. Made with Love!	Крымский мост. Сделано с любовью!	Tigran Keosayan	Aleksey Demidov, Katerina Shpitsa, Artyom Tkachenko	
November 8	Forsaken	Пришелец	Alexander Kulikov	Andrey Smolyakov, Maksim Vitorgan, Grigoriy Siyatvinda	
November 8	Let It Be Liza	Пусть будет Лиза	Igor Kagramanov	Yelena Makhova	
November 29	All or Nothing	Всё или ничего	Dmitry Suvorov	Roman Kurtsyn, Kirill Kaganovich, Danila Yakushev	Three men start a real problem with breaking into a house.
November 29	The Soul Conductor	Проводник	Ilya Maksimov	Aleksandra Bortich, Yevgeny Tsyganov, Vladimir Yaglych, Vyacheslav Razbegaev	20th Century Fox CIS
December 6	Ferry Number Seven	Семь пар нечистых	Kirill Belevich	Yuri Borisov, Marie Vorozhi, Timofey Tribuntsev, Mikhail Evlanov, Aleksandr Vershinin	Shortly before the war in the North on the ship carrying a batch of future anti-aircraft guns. The rebellion of the prisoners on the ship is doubly terrible, prevents the onset of World War II.
December 27	T-34	Т-34	Aleksey Sidorov	Alexander Petrov, Viktor Dobronravov, Irina Starshenbaum, Yuri Borisov, Anton Bogdanov	Central Partnership; The T-34 is a Soviet medium tank of the Great Patriotic War (term). The cinema tape was to be released on December 27, five days after the planned date of January 1, 2019.
December 27	The Three Heroes. The Heiress to the Throne	Три богатыря и Наследница престола	Konstantin Bronzit	Sergei Makovetsky, Dmitriy Bykovskiy, Valeriy Solovyov, Dmitriy Vysotskiy	Melnitsa Animation Studio; Official website

=== Culturally Russian films ===
- Kursk is a 2018 French-Belgian drama film directed by Thomas Vinterberg.
- Red Sparrow is a 2018 American spy thriller film directed by Francis Lawrence.
- The White Crow is a 2018 British biographical drama film directed by Ralph Fiennes. The film has an international cast which includes Russian and Ukrainian actors.

== See also ==
- 2018 in film
- 2018 in Russia
