= Satoshi Mikami =

Japanese actor and voice actor

- 三上 哲
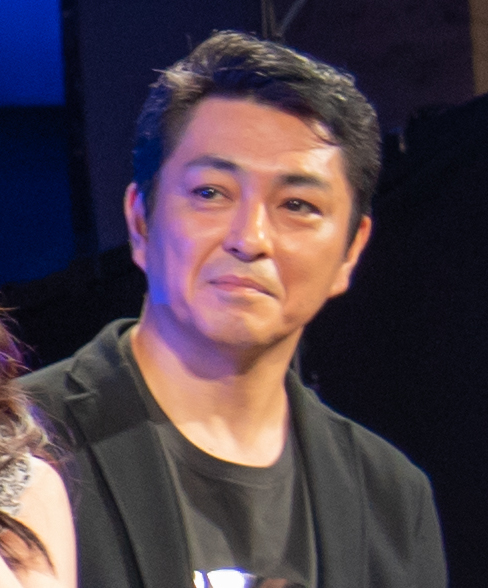
- Mikami in 2018
- Born: Tokyo, Japan
- Occupations: Actor; voice actor
- Years active: 1999–present

Satoshi Mikami (三上 哲, Mikami Satoshi) is a Japanese actor and voice actor from Tokyo. He is the best known official dubbing roles for Benedict Cumberbatch, especially in Doctor Strange and the film series Avengers.

Before pursuing a career in voice-acting, he was the lead singer of D.O.M.E., a short-lived spinoff group based on, and which included original members from, Omega Tribe.

== Filmography ==
=== Television dramas ===
- Bakuryū Sentai Abaranger (2003)
- Aibō (2006)
- Engine Sentai Go-onger (2008)
- Doubutsu Sentai Zyuohger (2016)

=== Television animation ===
- Jewelpet (2009) – Takeo Nanase
- Giant Killing (2010) – Sumita
- Lupin III: the Last Job (2010) – Detective Leone
- Rozen Maiden (2013) – Laplace's Demon
- Samurai Flamenco (2013) – Akira Konno
- Durarara!!x2 (2015) – Sloan
- Gangsta. (2015) – Theo
- 91 Days (2016) – Testa Lagusa
- Black Clover (2018) - Fanzell Kruger
- Zoids Wild Zero (2019) – Dias
- 86 (2021) – Jerome Carlstahl
- Battle Athletes Victory ReSTART! (2021) – Jefferson Natdhipytadd
- Peach Boy Riverside (2021) – Kyūketsuki
- The Night Beyond the Tricornered Window (2021) – Hiroki Hanzawa
- Akebi's Sailor Uniform (2022) – Sato Akebi
- Delicious Party PreCure (2022) – Fennel/Godatz
- Requiem of the Rose King (2022) – Earl of Warwick
- Mobile Suit Gundam: The Witch from Mercury (2023) – Olcott
- Golden Kamuy 4th Season (2023) – Michael Ostrog
- Meiji Gekken: 1874 (2024) – Kyōshirō Shuragami
- Tonari no Yōkai-san (2024) – Gorōzaemon Sanmoto
- The New Gate (2024) – Girard Estaria
- Orb: On the Movements of the Earth (2024–2025) – Antoni
- Solo Leveling (2025) – Ryuji Goto
- Lazarus (2025) – Instructor
- The Water Magician (2025) – Hugh McGrath
- Digimon Beatbreak (2026) – Klay Arslan

=== Theatrical animation ===
- Genocidal Organ (2017) – Williams
- My Oni Girl (2024) – Izuru

=== Video games ===
- Metal Gear Solid V: The Phantom Pain (2015) – Ocelot
- Watch Dogs (2014, Japanese dub) – Damien
- Dissidia Final Fantasy NT (2018) – Kam'lanaut
- Death Stranding (2019) – Higgs
- Nioh 2 (2020) – Akechi Mitsuhide
- Saint Seiya Awakening (2020) – Thanatos
- Tactics Ogre: Reborn (2022) – Lanselot Tartaros
- Fate/Grand Order (2023) – Tezcatlipoca
- Honkai: Star Rail (2024) - Gallagher

=== Dubbing ===
==== Live-action ====
- Benedict Cumberbatch
  - Marple: Murder Is Easy – Luke Fitzwilliam
  - Sherlock – Sherlock Holmes
  - Third Star – James
  - Wreckers – David
  - Parade's End – Christopher Tietjens
  - August: Osage County – "Little" Charles Aiken
  - Star Trek Into Darkness – Khan
  - The Imitation Game – Alan Turing
  - Black Mass – William "Billy" Bulger
  - Zoolander 2 – All
  - Doctor Strange – Dr. Stephen Strange
  - Thor: Ragnarok – Dr. Stephen Strange
  - The Child in Time – Stephen Lewis
  - Avengers: Infinity War – Dr. Stephen Strange
  - Patrick Melrose – Patrick Melrose
  - Avengers: Endgame – Dr. Stephen Strange
  - Between Two Ferns: The Movie – Benedict Cumberbatch
  - 1917 – Colonel Mackenzie
  - The Current War – Thomas Edison
  - The Power of the Dog – Phil Burbank
  - Spider-Man: No Way Home – Dr. Stephen Strange
  - Doctor Strange in the Multiverse of Madness – Dr. Stephen Strange
- 90210 – Oscar (Blair Redford)
- All Roads Lead to Rome – Luca (Raoul Bova)
- American Heist – Ray (Tory Kittles)
- Amsterdam – Tom Voze (Rami Malek)
- Anatomy of a Fall – Vincent Renzi (Swann Arlaud)
- Another Life – Erik Wallace (Justin Chatwin)
- Avengers Grimm – Rumpelstiltskin (Casper Van Dien)
- Bad Guy – Lee Beom-woo (Ji Hoo)
- Barefoot in the Park (Netflix edition) – Paul Bratter (Robert Redford)
- Blackway – Blackway (Ray Liotta)
- Broadchurch – Lee Ashworth (James D'Arcy)
- Colt 45 – Luc Denard (Simon Abkarian)
- A Dangerous Man – Chen (Terry Chen)
- Dark Skies – Daniel Barrett (Josh Hamilton)
- Deadpool & Wolverine - Peter (Rob Delaney)
- Downton Abbey – Thomas Barrow (Rob James-Collier)
- Dream Scenario – Chris (Al Warren)
- Eureka – Dr. Trevor Grant (James Callis)
- Fargo – Emmit Stussy and Raymond "Ray" Stussy (Ewan McGregor)
- Final Approach – Jack Bender (Dean Cain)
- The Finest Hours – Daniel Cluff (Eric Bana)
- The Games Maker – Morodian (Joseph Fiennes)
- The Girl with All the Gifts – Sergeant Eddie Parks (Paddy Considine)
- Gogol. The Beginning – Investigator Yakov Petrovich Guro (Oleg Menshikov)
- Gogol. Terrible Revenge – Investigator Yakov Petrovich Guro (Oleg Menshikov)
- Hard Kill – Derek Miller (Jesse Metcalfe)
- Hitchcock – Lew Wasserman (Michael Stuhlbarg)
- The Hot Zone – Trevor Rhodes (James D'Arcy)
- Ice Twisters – Frank (Robert Moloney)
- I Love You, Man – Tevin Downey (Rob Huebel)
- Irrational Man – Professor Abe Lucas (Joaquin Phoenix)
- Jurassic World Rebirth – Reuben Delgado (Manuel Garcia-Rulfo)
- The Last Rescue – Captain Beckett (Brett Cullen)
- Legend – Albert Donoghue (Paul Anderson)
- Mad Dogs – Joel (Ben Chaplin)
- The Magnificent Seven – Joshua Faraday (Chris Pratt)
- Marlowe – Lou Hendricks (Alan Cumming)
- Marriage Contract – Park Ho-joon (Kim Kwang-kyu)
- Métal Hurlant Chronicles – Joe Manda (Scott Adkins)
- Narcos: Mexico – Jaime Kuykendall (Matt Letscher)
- Precious Cargo – Jack (Mark-Paul Gosselaar)
- Reminiscence – Saint Joe (Daniel Wu)
- Rogue One – Orson Krennic (Ben Mendelsohn)
- The Roundup – Kang Hae-sang (Son Suk-ku)
- Shades of Blue – Robert Stahl (Warren Kole)
- Sputnik – Konstantin (Pyotr Fyodorov)
- Stiletto – Lee (Michael Biehn)
- The Twilight Zone – Dylan (Luke Kirby)
- Wrath of Man – Jackson Ainsley (Jeffrey Donovan)
- Zodiac: Signs of the Apocalypse – Neil Martin (Joel Gretsch)
- Zone 414 – David Carmichael (Guy Pearce)

==== Animation ====
- What If...? – Stephen Strange
