= Golden Eagle Award for Best Television Motion Picture (Russia) =

Annual Russian film award

- Awarded for: Best Television Motion Picture of the Year
- Country: Russia
- Presented by: National Academy of Motion Pictures Arts and Sciences of Russia
- First award: 2002
- Currently held by: Stolypin (Столыпин, 2024)
- Website: Official site of the National Academy of Motion Picture Arts and Sciences of Russia

The Golden Eagle Award for Best Television Motion Picture (Russian: Золотой Орёл для лучший игровой телевизионный фильм) is one of twenty award categories presented annually by the National Academy of Motion Pictures Arts and Sciences of Russia. It is one of the Golden Eagle Awards, which were conceived by Nikita Mikhalkov as a counterweight to the annual Nika Awards given by the Russian Academy of Cinema Arts and Sciences.

Each year the members of the academy choose three nominees from among television films (movies directly released to television), which have been popular in Russia since the 1950s because of their inexpensive production. The movies therefore typically have only Russian titles. The category excludes motion pictures and documentaries, which have their own categories. The first film to be awarded was Spetsnaz. The name of the award was changed to Golden Eagle Award for Best Mini-Series (up to 8 episodes) in 2004 and later Golden Eagle Award for Best Telefilm or Mini-Series (up to 10 episodes) in 2006, which merged mini-series with telefilms. Since then, the award has been won only by mini-series; no telefilms have received the prize since. The most recent award in 2024 was made to Stolypin (Столыпин).

Vladimir Khotinenko holds the record for the most wins, with three; other people with multiple nominations are Gleb Panfilov, Boris Khlebnikov (both with two wins), Andrei Malyokov (with two wins and three nominations), Vladimir Bortko, Egor Baranov, Alexey Andrianov (each with one win and one nomination), Bakhtyar Khudojnazarov, and Yuri Moroz (both with two nominations but no wins).

== Nominations and awards ==
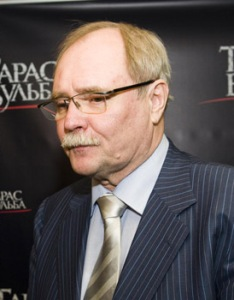
Vladimir Bortko's Idiot (Идиот) was the last television film to be awarded; since then only mini-series received this award until 2020.

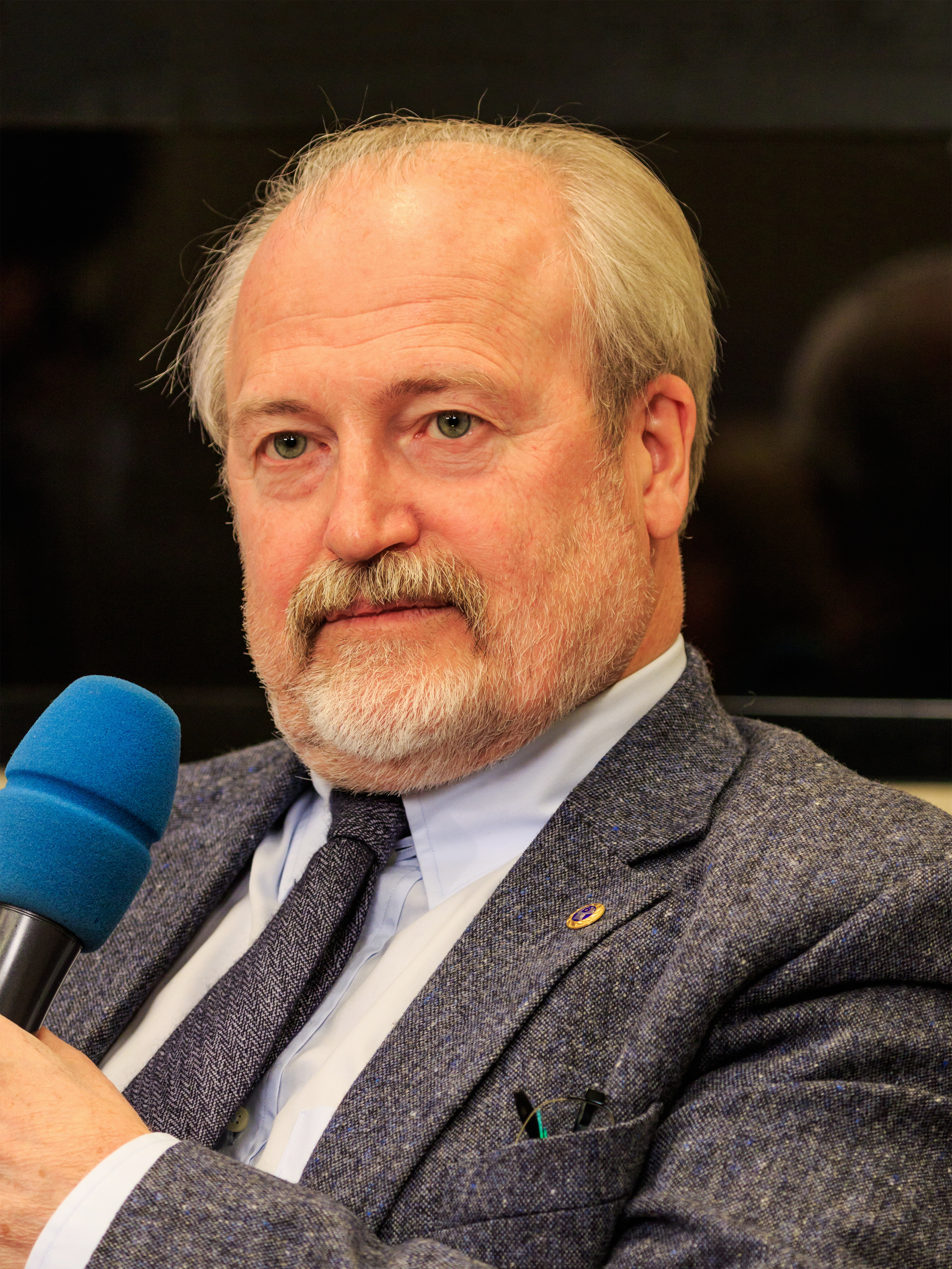
Vladimir Khotinenko holds the record for the most wins, with three.

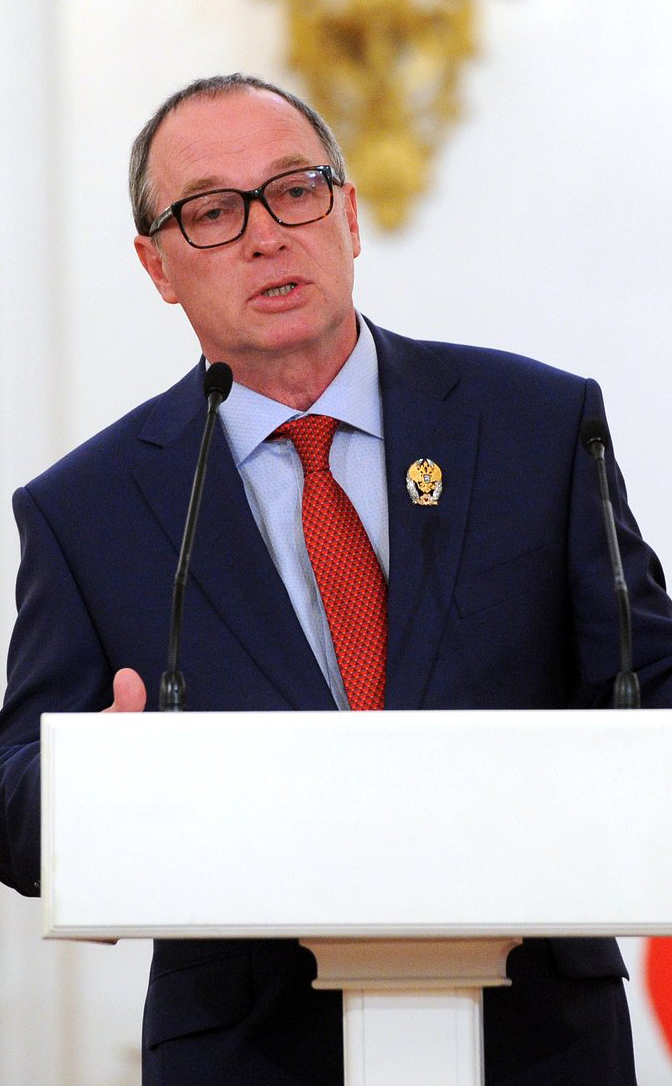
Sergei Ursuliak – the recent winner

Key

Sign	Meaning
Bold‡	Indicates the winner

Year	Original title	Transliterated title (per BGN/PCGN standard)	Director	Episodes (Mini-Series)	Ref
2002	Спецназ‡	Spetsnaz	Andrei Malyokov	—	
2002	Next	—	Oleg Fomin	—	
2002	Азазель	Azazel	Alexandr Abadashyan	—	
2003	Идиот‡	Idiot	Vladimir Bortko	—	
2003	Наследницы	Naslednitsy	Elyor Ishmukhamedov	—	
2003	Театральный роман	Teatral'nyy Roman	Yuri Goldin, Oleg Babitsky	—	
2004	Честь имею!..‡	Chest' imeyu!..	Viktor Buturlin	4 episodes	
2004	Нумер в гостинице города NN	Numer v gostinitse goroda NN	Valery Fokin	—	
2004	Француз	Frantsuz	Vera Storozheva	2 episodes	
2005	Гибель империи‡	Gibel' imperii	Vladimir Khotinenko	10 episodes	
2005	Курсанты	Kursanty	Andrey Kavun	10 episodes	
2005	Диверсант	Diversant	Andrei Malyukov	4 episodes	
2006	В круге первом‡	V Kruge Pervom	Gleb Panfilov	10 episodes	
2006	Грозовые ворота	Grozovye Vorota	Andrei Malyokov	4 episodes	
2006	Дело о мертвых душах	Delo o Mertvykh Dushakh	Pavel Lungin	8 episodes	
2007	Ленинград‡	Leningrad	Alexandr Buravsky	4 episodes	
2007	Билет в гарем	Bilet v Garem	Vadim Sokolovsky	8 episodes	
2007	На пути к сердцу	Na Puti k Serdtsu	Abay Karpykov	10 episodes	
2008	Диверсант. Конец войны‡	Diversant. Konets Voyny	Igor Zaitsev	8 episodes	
2008	Преступление и наказание	Prestuplenie i nakazanie	Dmitry Svetosarov	8 episodes	
2008	Танкер танго	Tanker Tango	Bakhtyar Khudojnazarov	6 episodes	
2009	Без Вины Виноватые‡	Bez Viny Vinovatye	Gleb Panfilov	2 episodes	
2009	Братья Карамазовиы	Brat'ya Karamasovyy	Yuri Moroz	8 episodes	
2009	Галина	Galina	Vitaly Pavlov	8 episodes	
2010	Веребное Воскресенье‡	Verebnoe Voskresenye	Anton Sivers	8 episodes	
2010	Котовский	Kotovsky	Stanislav Nazirov	8 episodes	
2010	Пелагер и белый бульдог	Pelager i belyy Bul'dog	Yuri Moroz	8 episodes	
2011	Достоевский‡	Dostoyevsky	Vladimir Khotinenko	8 episodes	
2011	Баллада о бомбере	Ballada o bombere	Vitaly Borobyev	8 episodes	
2011	Пётр Первый. Завещание	Pyotr Pervy. Zaveshchanie	Vladimir Bortko	4 episodes	
2012	Белая гвардия‡	Belaya gvardiya	Sergey Snezhkin	8 episodes	
2012	Дело гастронома No. 1	Delo gastronoma No. 1	Sergey Azhkenazi	8 episodes	
2012	Охотники за бриллиантами	Okhotniki za brilliantami	Alexander Kott	8 episodes	
2013	Мосгаз‡	Mosgaz	Andrei Malyukov	8 episodes	
2013	Людмила	Lyudmila	Aleksandr Pavlovskiy	8 episodes	
2013	Всё началось в Харбине	Vso nachalos' v Kharbine	Leo Zisman	8 episodes	
2014	Бесы‡	Besy	Vladimir Khotinenko	4 episodes	
2014	Гетеры майора Соколова	Getery mayora Sokolova	Bakhtyar Khudojnazarov	8 episodes	
2014	Крик совы	Krik sovy	Oleg Pogodin	10 episodes	
2015	Палач‡	Palach	Vyacheslav Nikiforov	10 episodes	
2015	Уходящая натура	Ukhodyashchaya natura	Dmitriy Iosifov	8 episodes	
2015	Чудотворец	Chudotvorec	Dmitriy Konstantinov	8 episodes	
2016	Клим‡	Klim	Karen Oganesyan	8 episodes	
2016	Деньги	Den'gi	Egor Anashkin	8 episodes	
2016	Фарца	Farca	Egor Baranov	8 episodes	
2017	Анна Каренина. История Вронского‡	Anna Karenina. Istoriya Vronskogo	Karen Shakhnazarov	8 episodes	
2017	София	Sofija	Alexey Andrianov	8 episodes	
2017	Торгсин	Torgsin	Dmitry Petrun	8 episodes	
2018	Sпарта‡	Sparta	Egor Baranov	8 episodes	
2018	Обычная женщина	Obychnaya zhenshchina	Boris Khlebnikov	9 episodes	
2018	Остаться в живых	Ostat'sya v zhivykh	Andrei Malyukov	6 episodes	
2019	Годунов‡	Godunov	Alexey Andrianov	17 episodes	
2019	Звоните ДиКаприо!	Zvonite DiKaprio!	Zhora Kryzhovnikov	8 episodes	
2019	Шторм	Shtorm	Boris Khlebnikov	8 episodes	
2020	Одесский пароход‡	Odesskiy parokhod	Sergei Ursuliak	—	
2020	Дипломат	Diplomat	Yuri Kuzmenko	16 episodes	
2020	Магомаев	Magomayev	Dmitriy Tyurin, Roman Prygunov	8 episodes	
