= Sputnik (film) =

2020 Russian science fiction horror film

- Promotional release poster
- Directed by: Egor Abramenko
- Written by: Oleg Malovichko; Andrei Zolotarev
- Produced by: Mikhail Vrubel; Aleksandr Andryushchenko; Fyodor Bondarchuk; Ilya Stewart; Murad Osmann; Pavel Burya; Vyacheslav Murugov; Alina Tyazhlova; Michael Kitaev; Ilya Jincharadze
- Starring: Oksana Akinshina; Fyodor Bondarchuk; Pyotr Fyodorov; Anton Vasiliev
- Cinematography: Maxim Zhukov
- Edited by: Aleksandr Puzyryov; Egor Tarasenko
- Music by: Oleg Karpachev
- Production companies: Vodorod Pictures; Art Pictures Studio; Hype Film; National Media Group Studio; STS
- Distributed by: Sony Pictures
- Release date: April 23, 2020 (Russia)
- Running time: 113 minutes
- Country: Russia
- Language: Russian
- Budget: ₽190 million (~US$2.6 million)
- Box office: $354,023

Sputnik (Russian: Спутник) is a 2020 Russian science-fiction horror film directed by Egor Abramenko in his feature directorial debut. It stars Oksana Akinshina as a young doctor who is recruited by the Soviet military to assess a cosmonaut who survived a mysterious space accident and returned to Earth with a dangerous organism living inside him. Alongside Akinshina, the film's cast includes Pyotr Fyodorov and Fyodor Bondarchuk.

Sputnik was scheduled to have its world premiere at the Tribeca Film Festival in April 2020 prior to the festival being postponed due to the COVID-19 pandemic. The film was released on video-on-demand in Russia on April 23, 2020. It received generally positive reviews from critics.

== Plot ==
In 1983, two Russian cosmonauts hear something moving outside their spaceship. The ship then crashes in Kazakhstan. The sole survivor is Konstantin Veshnyakov. The military takes Veshnyakov to a military research facility run by Colonel Semiradov.

Veshnyakov cannot remember the crash. The facility's scientist, Yan Rigel, tries and fails to cure the amnesia. Semiradov decides to recruit a controversial psychiatrist named Dr. Tatyana Yuryevna Klimova. Klimova quickly discerns that Veshnyakov shows symptoms of post-traumatic stress.

Semiradov shows Klimova that at night, an alien emerges from Veshnyakov's mouth as he sleeps. Semiradov explains the creature emerges every night without Veshnyakov's knowledge, and that it is responsible for Veshnyakov's survival. The facility tried to extract the alien, but it is now symbiotically bonded to Veshnyakov and both will slowly die if separated. Klimova agrees to investigate how to separate Veshnyakov from the alien permanently – much to Rigel's jealous chagrin.

Klimova decides she must test how Veshnyakov's hormones react to stress. She provokes him with accusations of abandoning his son and causing his colleague's death. Afterwards, Klimova asks for Veshnyakov to stay in a normal room during daylight hours instead of a cell, to see how he reacts to normal civilian life. She apologizes to Veshnyakov for her harsh words, and he tells her that he only found out about his son one week before his space mission. He had planned to meet his son after going home, but is now stuck in the facility.

At night, Klimova interacts with the emerged alien from behind protective glass. She notices it fixate on a toy that belongs to Veshnyakov, and daringly removes the glass so she can give the toy to the alien. The creature ignores Klimova and plays with the toy. But when Klimova tries to touch the creature, it attacks her. Soldiers extract Klimova and contain the creature.

Klimova theorizes the alien has merged with Veshnyakov, and it took interest in the toy because it reminds Veshnyakov of his son. She requests to take Veshnyakov to Moscow for treatment. Semiradov reveals this is impossible. His superiors in Moscow want to terminate Veshnyakov, and Semiradov has been lying about their research progress to keep Veshnyakov alive.

While reviewing surveillance footage of the alien, Klimova realizes it is edited. She confronts Rigel, and he takes her to see Semiradov feeding live humans to the alien at night. Rigel reveals that the creature needs cortisol from a living, terrified human to keep itself and Veshnyakov alive.

Disgusted, Klimova asks Veshnyakov to meet in secret. Veshnyakov incapacitates his guards, and Klimova shows him the bodies of the alien's victims. She explains the alien chose Veshnyakov as its host because his co-pilot had Addison's disease. Veshnyakov reveals he can remember everything the creature experiences, but has been hiding it because he wants the Moscow authorities to approve his release. Klimova is horrified that Veshnyakov could accept sacrificing human lives, but Veshnyakov explains that he will do anything to return to his son and his mother.

Semiradov summons Klimova and reveals he knows she spied on the feeding. He defends his actions by explaining the alien is a powerful weapon the Soviets need to maintain peace, and that he only feeds it prisoners who have committed monstrous crimes. Semiradov allows Klimova to watch another feeding. However, Klimova requests to enter the feeding area and sings Veshnyakov's favourite song to the alien. At first, the creature softens and backs away. But when the prisoner tries to run, the creature kills him anyways.

Klimova decides she must stop the experiment and help Veshnyakov escape. She convinces Rigel to help her. Then she convinces Veshnyakov that Semiradov will never let him leave. She plans to inject Veshnyakov with hormones that simulate Addison's disease, tricking the alien into rejecting Veshnyakov and permanently separating them. Rigel gives Klimova and Veshnyakov a set of car keys, and then confesses everything to the Moscow authorities by telephone just before Semiradov murders him.

Semiradov's soldiers intercept Klimova and Veshnyakov. Cornered, Veshnyakov injects himself with the hormones prematurely, forcing the alien to emerge and attack the soldiers. The resulting chaos allows Klimova to drag Veshnyakov into the car and drive off. But Veshnyakov begins dying, and Klimova realizes he still needs the alien to live.

Klimova allows Semiradov to catch up, knowing he will bring the injured alien to Veshnyakov. But before he can, Veshnyakov takes voluntary control of the alien and uses it to kill Semiradov and his men.

Klimova spots trucks coming from Moscow thanks to Rigel. However, Veshnyakov decides he must die with the creature to avoid more killing, and shoots himself in the head. Klimova survives and adopts Veshnyakov's son.

== Cast ==
- Oksana Akinshina as Tatyana Yuryevna Klimova, a physician/neurophysiologist
- Fyodor Bondarchuk as Colonel Semiradov
- Pyotr Fyodorov as Konstantin Veshnyakov
- Anton Vasiliev as Yan Rigel
- Vitaliya Korniyenko as young Tatyana
- Aleksey Demidov as Kirill Averchenko
- Anna Nazarova as Nurse
- Aleksandr Marushev as Convict Ruben
- Albrecht Zander as Convict Seryj
- Pavel Ustinov as Convoy
- Vasiliy Zotov as Biologist
- Natalya Shvets (ru) as Chairwoman of the Commission

== Production ==
Principal photography for the film took place in Moscow in the winter of 2018–2019. Most of the film's scenes were shot at the Shemyakin-Ovchinnikov Institute of Bioorganic Chemistry.

== Release ==
Sputnik was scheduled to have its world premiere at the Tribeca Film Festival in April 2020 before the festival was postponed due to the COVID-19 pandemic. Sony Pictures had slated a theatrical release for the film in Russia on April 16, 2020, but the film was instead released on video-on-demand in Russia on the platforms More.tv, Wink and Ivi.ru on April 23. IFC Midnight acquired the film's North American distribution rights earlier that same month. The film was released in select theaters and on video-on-demand in North America on August 14, 2020.

Upon release in Russia, over one million people streamed Sputnik on More.tv, Wink and Ivi.ru, making the film the most-streamed title across those services in two years, surpassing American titles and other Russian titles.

== Reception ==
=== Box office and VOD ===
In its debut American weekend, the film was the fifth-most rented film on Apple TV, and also grossed around $11,000 from 32 theaters.

=== Critical response ===
On review aggregator website Rotten Tomatoes, the film holds an approval rating of 88% based on 121 reviews, with an average rating of 7/10. The site's critics consensus reads: "Effective space alien horror with a Soviet-era twist, Sputnik proves there are still some scary good sci-fi thrillers left in the galaxy." Metacritic assigned the film a weighted average score of 61 out of 100, based on 19 critics, indicating "generally favorable reviews".

Pavel Voronkov of Gazeta.Ru called the film's story "charmingly uncomplicated", and wrote that, unlike "The Blackout by Egor Baranov (in which Fedorov also acted), it does not hurt at all to watch." Dmitry Shepelyov of Igromania commended the film's visuals but lamented that "clichés become the main driving force of the story", concluding: "Tweak the script, write the characters better, add more bloody action, and Sputnik could be called an excellent fantasy thriller. But this is just a more or less competent B-category film."

Matt Zoller Seitz, in his review of the film for RogerEbert.com, gave it a score of three-and-a-half out of four stars, and praised the relationship between the two main characters: "The performances and characterizations add heft, and the very Russian vibe of soulful heaviness sets it apart from its American cousins." Ian Freer of Empire gave the film three out of five stars, praising its "fun creature design and good gore" and calling it a "blunt but effective thriller". Joe Morgenstern of The Wall Street Journal wrote that the film's "strong performances, strikingly spare production design and somber cinematography convey a sense of something important going on. That's no small achievement in what proves to be a creature feature with flair."

The New York Times' Glenn Kenny wrote that "While Sputnik doesn't make its substantial borrowings from other sci-fi pictures entirely new, it does juice them up enough to yield a genuinely scary and satisfying experience." Tomris Laffley of Variety referred to the film as a "claustrophobic character study with gripping set pieces [and] serviceable spatters of gross-out B-movie gore"; she also praised Akinshina's "charismatic lead performance", comparing the character favorably to Ellen Ripley of the Alien franchise. Conversely, John DeFore of The Hollywood Reporter wrote that the film's "intensely serious tone belies some awfully silly stuff in its plot", and summarized the film as being "Duller than it sounds."

=== Accolades ===
Award	Year	Category	Recipient	Result	Ref(s)
Saturn Awards	October 26, 2021	Best International Film	Sputnik	Nominated	

== See also ==
- Life (2017 film)
