= Fartsa (TV series) =

Russian criminal TV drama

- Genre: Crime drama; Psychological thriller
- Directed by: Egor Baranov
- Starring: Alexander Petrov; Yevgeny Stychkin; Aleksei Serebryakov
- Composer: Pavel Esenin
- No. of seasons: 1
- No. of episodes: 8

Production
- Producers: Alexander Tsekalo; Ruslan Sorokin; Ivan Samokhvalov
- Running time: 50–52 minutes
- Production company: Sreda

Original release
- Network: Channel One
- Release: 30 March 2015

Fartsa (Russian: Фарца́) is a Russian criminal drama about fartsovka (a widespread phenomenon in the USSR from the 1950s-1980s).

In early 2017 Fartsa became one of the first Russian TV series to be sold to the world's largest American online video service, Netflix.

== Story ==
Kostya Germanov has lost badly at cards, and is heavily in debt to organized criminals. His three friends, Andrei, Boris and Sanya, decide to help Kostya. The four friends are forced to become speculators as it is the only way to help their friend.

== Cast ==
- Alexander Petrov as Andrei Trofimov
- Philipp Gorenstein as Boris Zeller
- Yevgeny Stychkin as Maksim Pontonov (Pont)
- Zoya Berber as Nadya Vostrikova
- Aleksei Serebryakov as German Vostrikov
- Taisiya Vilkova as Zina Zeller
- Aleksandr Yatsenko as Sergei Zadorozhny
- Yekaterina Volkova as Valeria Lanskaya, editor of Yunost
- Lyudmila Arinina as grandma Rusha
- Daniil Strakhov as Gennady Shpalikov
- Yevgeny Tsyganov as Yan Rokotov

== Crew ==
- Editors — Maxim Urmanov, Dmitry Slyusarchuk, Sergey Akimov
- Second Director — Galina Strizhevskaya
- Second Operator — Artyom Ignatov
- Chief Editor — Olga Shentorovich
- Stunt Coordinator — Viktor Ivanov
- Production Designer — Sergey Tyrin
- Costume Designer — Ekaterina Dyminskaya
- Make-up Artist — Natalia Krymskaya
- Make-up — Olga Mironova
- Sound Producer — Valentin Shupenich

== Episodes ==
The premiere was broadcast March 30, 2015 on Russia's Channel One.

No.	Title
1 2	"Episodes 1-2"
The series is set in 1961, Moscow, in the epoch of Gagarin and space exploration. Novice writer Andrei, who has had a short story published in Yunost, returns to his hometown. He is met by his childhood friends. Soon all of them - Andrei, Boris, Sanya, and Kostya - become fartsovschiki. At the same time, they have a stormy personal life: Andrei is happy with his fiancée Nadya, Kostya is in love with Boris's sister Zina, and Boris is fascinated by the prostitute Tatyana that he meets at work. Nobody knows about Sanya's secret love. Andrei, with the help of Yanskoy's editor, Lanskaya, becomes the secretary of Mikhail Svetlov. After daring successful adventures, the guys come to the attention of the criminal overlord Pont.
3	"Episode 3"
At the music-lover Boris's suggestion, the friends start producing and marketing illegal copies of records made on X-rays. They decide to hide the money from their sales in the cell of the storage chamber. The friends clash with currency traders, to whom Kostya in also heavily in debt. To save everyone, someone must take the blame.
4	"Episode 4"
A year later, the friends reach a new level and begin to experiment with cinematographic equipment. The director of commissions, against whom the guys have compromising evidence, is forced to help them. Major Vostrikov, Nadi's father, starts on the trail of the daring fartsovshchiki, unaware that he is well acquainted with the organizer of transactions.
5	"Episode 5"
Andrei has had a long-standing affair with Lanskaya, but she chases him away: everything that he now writes is gray and inept. Andrei gets drunk and does not attach importance to the disappearance of Tatiana, who is to meet with a foreigner at the National hotel to receive money. Zina is called to help - she speaks English well.
6	"Episode 6"
The friends decide to divide their shared money and engage in fartsovka. Vostrikov's investigation is complete: he demands that Andrei write a full confession, but Nadya does not allow it. Andrei learns about the underground illegal gambling den run by Pont.
7	"Episode 7"
The friends gather in the garage to share the money. But the cache is empty. Everyone suspects Kostya. Sanya proposes to Nadya, to her surprise. Vostrikov raids Pont's underground gambling den, but only arrests one person.
8	"Episode 8"
Vostrikov releases Andrei on parole from the cells for one hour so that he can take care of something. Zina comes to Andrei in the cells and confesses that she loves him. Andrei's trial sees an unexpected witness.
