= Gogol (film series) =

- Genre: Biographical
- Directed by: Egor Baranov
- Composer: RyanOtter
- Country of origin: Russia
- Original language: Russian
- No. of series: 1
- No. of episodes: 8

Production
- Producer: Alexander Tsekalo
- Cinematography: Sergei Trofimov
- Production company: Sreda

Original release
- Network: TV-3
- Release: 25 March – 4 April 2019

Gogol is a fantasy-horror films TV-series directed by Egor Baranov and produced by the Sreda production company. It is loosely based on works by Nikolai Gogol from the collection Evenings on a Farm near Dikanka. The title role is played by Alexander Petrov. Six episodes of the series had theatrical premieres as compilation films.

- Gogol. The Beginning is the first of three films of the project Gogol and the first Russian television series to have a theatrical release. It was released on August 31, 2017. It earned $7,757,988 at the box-office.
- Gogol. Viy was released on April 5, 2018, The box-office gross was $8 011 641.
- Gogol. Terrible Revenge was released on August 30, 2018.

The serial was shown on the TV channel TV-3 with two new episodes that didn't have a theatrical release.

== Films ==
- Gogol. The Beginning (2017)

- Chapter One. Murders in Dikanka
- Chapter Two. The Red Scroll

- Gogol. Viy (2018)

- Chapter Three. Enchanted place
  - Dead Souls (2019)
  - The well of blood (2019)
- Chapter Four. Viy

- Gogol. Terrible Revenge (2018)

- Chapter five. Rider's Lair
- Chapter six. Terrible Vengeance
