= Territory (2015 film) =

- Theatrical release poster
- Directed by: Aleksandr Melnik
- Written by: Aleksandr Melnik; Mikhail Aleksandrov; Oleg Kuvayev
- Based on: Territory is a novel (ru) by Oleg Kuvayev
- Produced by: Anton Melnik; Victoria Lupik
- Starring: Konstantin Lavronenko; Grigoriy Dobrygin; Egor Beroev; Kseniya Kutepova; Yevgeny Tsyganov
- Cinematography: Igor Grinyakin
- Edited by: Ekaterina Starovoytova
- Music by: Tuomas Kantelinen
- Production company: Andreevsky Flag Film Company
- Distributed by: VolgaFilm
- Release date: April 16, 2015 (Russia)
- Running time: 157 minutes
- Country: Russia
- Language: Russian
- Budget: $8.7 million ₽500 million
- Box office: $1.4 million ₽72 825 350

Territory (Russian: Территория, romanized: Territoriya) is a 2015 Russian adventure drama film written and directed by Aleksandr Melnik, a screen version of the same novel by Oleg Kuvaev. The film, like the book, is based on real events and narrates about the discovery of a grandiose gold deposit in the Far North-East of the Soviet Union. The film stars Konstantin Lavronenko, Grigoriy Dobrygin, Egor Beroev, Kseniya Kutepova and Yevgeny Tsyganov joining the cast.

The novel was previously adapted in the Soviet Union in 1978 by Aleksander Surin. The picture starred Donatas Banionis as Ilya Chinkov.

== Plot ==
1960 year. The Far North-East of the Soviet Union. Geographical reference: City Magadan and Village Pevek. After the war, the country needs gold, but the Territory continues to give only tin. Territory management is closed. Chief engineer, the legendary Ilya Chinkov is convinced that there is gold in the Territory. He challenges the fate and for one field season it is taken to find it. Using absolute authority, Chinkov organizes searches for gold in the Territory, despite the absence of direct instructions from the leadership and the sad fate of his predecessor, whose career was destroyed due to the fact that no gold was found in the Territory.

== Cast ==
- Konstantin Lavronenko as Ilya Chinkov
- Grigoriy Dobrygin as Sergei Baklakov
- Egor Beroev as Vladimir Mongolov
- Kseniya Kutepova as Sergushova, journalist
- Yevgeny Tsyganov as Andrei Gurin
- Vladislav Abashin as Zhora Apryatin
- Gerasim Vasilyev as Kyae
- Olga Krasko as Lyuda Hollywood
- Pyotr Fyodorov as Konstantin Vasilchikov (Uncle Kostya)
- Tamara Obutova as Tamara
- Oleg Shapkov as Kadorin (Sedoy)
- Konstantin Balakirev as Gigolov (Kefir)
- Andrey Nazimov as (Malysh)
- Oleg Sokolov
- Ramis Ibragimov
- Natalya Danilova as Lidiya Makarovna
- Aleksandr Korshunov as Sidorchuk
- Yevgeny Titov as Borya Bardykin

== Production ==
The production of film titles took place from May to October 2014. The video sequence is based on materials provided by the Department of the History of Geology, the Vernadsky State Geological Museum, the Russian Academy of Sciences (RAS).

== Release ==
On February 11, 2015, a preliminary screening for the press, artists, and the invited geological community of Russia took place in the Kremlin Palace of Congresses. The show was held on a 30-meter screen in 4K format.

Territory was released in the Russian Federation on April 16, 2015 by VolgaFilm.

== Reception ==
=== Box office ===
The film failed at the box office - with a budget of half a billion rubles, six times less was collected.
