= Love & Dance =

Israeli film from 2006

- סיפור חצי רוסי
- Directed by: Eitan Anner
- Written by: Eitan Anner
- Starring: Evgenia Dodina
- Cinematography: Itzik Portal
- Release dates: 20 May 2006 (Cannes); 5 October 2006 (Israel)
- Running time: 95 minutes
- Country: Israel
- Language: Hebrew

Love & Dance (Hebrew: סיפור חצי רוסי, translit. Sipur Hatzi-Russi) is a 2006 Israeli drama film directed by Eitan Anner. It was entered into the 28th Moscow International Film Festival.

== Cast ==
- Evgenia Dodina as Yulia
- Avi Kushnir as Rami
- Oksana Korostyshevskaya as Lena
- Kirill Safonov as Roman
- Vladimir Volov as Chen
- Valeria Voevodin as Natalie
- Talya Raz as Sharon
- David Kogen as Arthur
- Liron Alzrkiy as Esti
- Daniel Fridman as Shaaf
- Aviel Cohen as Stas
