= 101st Kilometer =

- Russian: 101-й километр
- Directed by: Leonid Maryagin
- Written by: Leonid Maryagin
- Produced by: Aleksandr Litvinov; Natalya Popova
- Starring: Pyotr Fyodorov; Sergey Kaplunov; Glafira Sotnikova; Oleg Zhukov; Evgeniy Kosyrev
- Cinematography: Yury Nevskiy
- Edited by: Leonid Maryagin
- Release date: 2001
- Country: Russia
- Language: Russian

101st Kilometer (Russian: 101-й километр) is a 2001 Russian drama film directed by Leonid Maryagin.

== Plot ==
The film takes place in the 50s in a city located at the 101st kilometre from Moscow, where criminals are sent, whose company includes a guy Leonid, whom the local leader offers to participate in robberies. And the militia, in turn, offer him to write denunciations.

== Cast ==
- Pyotr Fyodorov as Leonid
- Sergey Kaplunov as Zvonilkin
- Glafira Sotnikova as Rita
- Oleg Zhukov as Kostya
- Aleksey Chernykh as Trekalo
- Evgeniy Kosyrev
