= Taisiya Vilkova =

Russian actress

- Таисия Вилкова
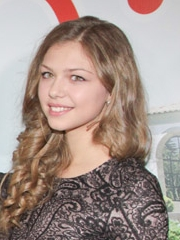
- Born: Taisiya Aleksandrovna Vilkova; October 25, 1996 (age 29); Moscow, Russia
- Occupation: Actress
- Years active: 2005-present
- Spouse: Semyon Serzin (actor)

Taisiya Aleksandrovna Vilkova (Russian: Таи́сия Алекса́ндровна Вилко́ва; born October 25, 1996) is a Russian actress. She appeared in over 30 films.

== Biography ==
Taisiya was born in Moscow on October 25, 1996, to actor Alexander Vilkov and producer Daria Goncharova. She was eight when her parents separated. Actor Mikhail Polosukhin is her step-father. She has two half brothers. In 2011, she began working as the host of the Disney channel. In 2013, Taisiya entered the Moscow Art Theatre School.

In March 2020, she married actor and director Semyon Serzin. In July of the same year, the couple had a daughter, Seraphim.

== Selected filmography ==
Year	Title	Role	Notes
2011	Lucky Trouble	Tasya	
2015	Fartsa	Zina Zeller	TV series
2016	Santa Claus. Battle of the Magi	Masha Petrova	
2017	Gogol. The Beginning	Liza Danishevskaya	
2017	Yolki 6	Yuliya	
2018	Alibi	Stasya Bobovskaya	TV series
2018	Gogol. Viy	Liza Danishevskaya	
2018	Gogol. Terrible Revenge	Liza Danishevskaya	
2020	Doctor Lisa	pregnant girl	
2020	Man from Podolsk	Galya	
2021	The Last Warrior: Root of Evil	Galina	
2021	Bender: The Beginning	Eva Machulskaya	
2021	Bender: Gold of the Empire	Eva Machulskaya	
2021	Bender: The Final Hustle	Eva Machulskaya	
2022	Disobedient	Nastya	
