= Kseniya Kutepova =

Russian actress

- Born: Kseniya Pavlovna Kutepova; 1 August 1971 (age 54); Moscow
- Occupation: Actress

Kseniya Pavlovna Kutepova (Russian: Ксе́ния Па́вловна Куте́пова; born 1 August 1971) is a Russian actress, Merited Artist of the Russian Federation, the winner of State Prize of the Russian Federation. She has appeared in over 40 films. She is the twin sister of actress Polina Kutepova.

== Biography ==
Kseniya was born on August 1, 1971, in Moscow. In her school years, together with her sister Polina, she studied in a theater studio and acted in two films. In 1988 she entered the directing department of Russian Institute of Theatre Arts in the studio of Pyotr Fomenko, after which she worked at the Moscow theatre Pyotr Fomenko Workshop and actively acted in films. Kseniya is the wife of Sergey Osipyan, with whom she has two children.

== Selected filmography ==
| Year | Title | Role | Notes |
|---|---|---|---|
| 1981 | Vasili and Vasilisa | Vologzhin's daughter | |
| 1995 | Small Demon | Valeriya | |
| 2003 | The Stroll | Elizabeth of Russia | |
| 2005 | Deadly Force 5 | investigator Golubeva | |
| 2011 | Guys from Mars | Liza Pryalkina | |
| 2013 | The Three Musketeers | Solicitor, Madame Coquenard | |
| 2015 | Territory | Sergushova, journalist | |
| 2019 | Beanpole | Lyubov Petrovna | |
| 2019 | The Blackout | Osmolovskaya | |
| 2022 | Young Man | Vanya's mom | |
