= Terra Nova (2008 film) =

2008 action film by Aleksandr Melnik

- Directed by: Aleksandr Melnik
- Written by: Arif Aliyev
- Starring: Konstantin Lavronenko; Andrei Feskov; Marat Basharov; Pavel Sborshchikov; Sergei Zhigunov; Aleksandr Samoylenko; Tommy 'Tiny' Lister; Ingeborga Dapkunaite
- Production company: Andreevsky Flag Film Company
- Distributed by: Nashe Kino
- Release dates: June 8, 2008 (Kinotavr Film Festival); August 28, 2008
- Running time: 120 minutes
- Country: Russia
- Languages: Russian; English

Terra Nova (transl. 'New Land'; Russian: Новая Земля) is an action film, directed by Aleksandr Melnik and released in 2008. The film stars Konstantin Lavronenko, Andrei Feskov, Marat Basharov, Pavel Sborshchikov, Sergei Zhigunov, Aleksandr Samoylenko, Tommy 'Tiny' Lister and Ingeborga Dapkunaite. It was filmed in Russia, Ukraine, Malta and Norway.

The film received the award for the Best Cinematography at the Sochi film festival.

== Plot ==
In 2013, capital punishment has been abolished. With prison spaces running out, a group of prisoners are taken to an island called Novaya Zemlya for the sake of an experiment.

== Cast ==
- Konstantin Lavronenko as Zhilin
- Andrei Feskov as Sipa
- Marat Basharov as Tolya
- Pavel Sborshchikov as Obezyan
- Sergei Zhigunov as Colonel
- Aleksandr Samoylenko as Ali
- Tommy 'Tiny' Lister as Sewing Dude
- Ingeborga Dapkunaite as Marta
- Sergey Koltakov as Makhov
- Evgeny Titov as Moryak
- Vladislav Abashin as Arzhanov
- Zaza Chichinadze as Amurbek
- Viktor Zhalsanov as Yakut
- Nikolai Stotsky as Volynets
- Igor Pismenniy as Olafson
