= Disobedient (film) =

- Directed by: Vladimir Kott
- Written by: Mikhail Bobrovnik; Vladimir Kott; Mikhail Zubko
- Produced by: Egor Shorokhov
- Starring: Viktor Khorinyak; Taisiya Vilkova; Aglaya Tarasova; Tatyana Orlova; Maksim Lagashkin
- Cinematography: Denis Panov
- Edited by: Dmitry Suvorov
- Music by: Alexey Chintsoz
- Production company: MEGOGO
- Distributed by: Karoprokat
- Release date: February 3, 2022
- Running time: 110 min.
- Country: Russia
- Language: Russian
- Budget: ~ $1 million (₽83 million)
- Box office: $ 280 288 (₽21,5 million)

Disobedient, also known as In the Name of a Prank (Russian: Непослушник, romanized: Neposlushnik) is a 2022 Russian comedy film directed by Vladimir Kott. It was theatrically released on February 3, 2022.

== Plot ==
The film tells the story of a popular Moscow blogger named Dima who runs a YouTube channel called "Dimonstr," where he posts videos of various pranks. After a provocative stunt in a church, he faces criminal charges for offending religious feelings. To evade the police, Dima steals a document of penance from his friend Sergey and heads to the Dimitrov Monastery in the Shuysky District of the Ivanovo region, planning to hide there while posing as a novice monk.

== Cast ==
- Viktor Khorinyak as Dima
- Taisiya Vilkova as Nastya
- Aglaya Tarasova as Olesya
- Tatyana Orlova as Efrosinya
- Maksim Lagashkin as Protoiereus
- Anatoly Zhuravlyov as Gena
- Sergey Selin as Petrovich, Dima's dad
- Leonid Gromov as Ivan Anatolyevich Shcherbakov
- Yury Kuznetsov as father Anatoly
