= Distant Loved Ones =

2022 Russian comedy drama film

- Directed by: Ivan Sosnin
- Written by: Ivan Sosnin
- Produced by: Aleksandr Bondarev; Igor Mishin; Andrey Tereshok
- Starring: Ekaterina Ageyeva; Filipp Avdeyev; Kirill Käro; Irina Pegova; Evgeniy Sytyy; Andrey Urgant; Elena Yakovleva
- Cinematography: Ivan Solomatin
- Music by: Arsen Baderkhan
- Production companies: KIT Film Studio; MTS Media; Red Pepper Film
- Release date: 29 September 2022 (Russia)
- Country: Russia
- Language: Russian

Distant Loved Ones (Russian: Далёкие близкие, romanized: Dalyokiye blizkiye, lit. 'distant close') is a 2022 Russian road comedy drama film directed by Ivan Sosnin, theatrically released on 29 September 2022.

== Plot ==
The film tells of a geography teacher at a Khabarovsk school who lives a routine life and gradually moves away from his son Misha. Everything changes when Misha decides to give his dad his old smartphone, as a result of which, the father begins to register on social media networks.

== Cast ==
- Ekaterina Ageyeva as Masha
- Filipp Avdeyev as Misha
- Kirill Käro as trucker
- Irina Pegova as Natalya Pavlovna
- Evgeniy Sytyy as Boris
- Andrey Urgant as Vova
- Elena Yakovleva as Nadezhda
- Dmitry Lysenkov as director
- Sofiya Suchkova as Masha's friend
- Andrei Blagoslovensky as neighbor
