= Brief Guide To A Happy Life =

- Genre: Drama
- Written by: Anna Kozlova
- Directed by: Valeriya Gai Germanika
- Starring: Svetlana Khodchenkova; Ksenia Gromova; Alisa Khazanova
- Country of origin: Russia
- Original language: Russian
- No. of series: 1
- No. of episodes: 16

Production
- Producers: Konstantin Ernst; Denis Evstigeniev
- Cinematography: Vsevolod Kaptur

Original release
- Network: Channel One Russia
- Release: 12 March – 5 April 2012

Brief Guide To A Happy Life (Russian: Краткий курс счастливой жизни, romanized: Kratkiy kurs schastlivoi zhizni) is a Russian sixteen serial television series, filmed by director Valeriya Gai Germanika and with a scenario by Anna Kozlova. It was aired on Channel One Russia from 12 March to 5 April 2012.

== Plot ==
The series tells the story of four young women working in the recruiting agency New recruit their families and relations with men.

Sasha is lonely and single. She is divorced, lives with her young son, mother and grandmother. When she meets Pyotr, who would later become her boss and lover, a new period begins in my life.

Not everything is perfect with her new colleagues either. The secretary Anya is busy searching for her second half. Lyuba is deciding how to deal with the fact that she is not able to have children, and Katya is mired in a family home which she can no longer tolerate.

== Cast ==
- Svetlana Khodchenkova as Sasha
- Ksenia Gromova as Katya
- Alisa Khazanova as Lyuba
- Anna Slyu as Anya
- Kirill Safonov as Pyotr Alekseevich Shirokov
- Alexey Barabash as Dima
- Kirill Zhandarov as Sergey
- Yekaterina Volkova as Polina
- Alexandra Nazarova as Bella
- Yola Sanko as Emma
- Sergey Burunov as Timur
- Igor Zolotovitsky as Alexander, lawyer
- Alisa Priznyakova as Natasha
- Roman Volobuev as Jura, a serial killer
- Valery Barinov as Vladimir Ivanovich
- Valeriya Gai Germanika as Ms. Fedora, clairvoyant
- Valentin Smirnitsky as Ilya Ilych
- Agniya Kuznetsova as girl
- Irina Khakamada as Vera Rodinka, psychologist
- Ksenia Sobchak as Nadya
- Valeria Kudryavtseva as Svetlana
- Tatyana Lyutaeva as Olga
- Bianka as cameo

== Soundtrack ==
In the series are performed by the composition of Eva Polna, Zveri, Yolka, Slava, Yulia Chicherina, NikitA, Linda, DJ Smash, Timati, Vintage, Noize MC, Auktyon, BoomBox, Bianka, Sergey Shnurov, Oskar Kuchera, Grigory Leps, Smyslovye Gallyutsinatsii, Irina Bogushevskaya, Brainstorm and others.
