= Territory (1979 film) =

- Directed by: Aleksander Surin
- Written by: Oleg Kuvaev
- Starring: Donatas Banionis; Vladimir Letenkov
- Cinematography: Yuri Nevsky
- Music by: Eduard Artemyev
- Production company: Mosfilm
- Release date: 1979
- Running time: 98 minutes
- Country: Soviet Union
- Language: Russian

Territory (Russian: Территория, romanized: Territoriya) is a 1979 Soviet adventure drama film directed by Aleksander Surin based on the novel of the same name by Oleg Kuvaev.

The film tells of the difficult search, exploration and the subsequent discovery of gold deposits in Chukotka in the late 1940s and early 1950s of Dalstroy.

In 2015 a remake was released which was directed by Aleksandr Melnik and starred Konstantin Lavronenko.

== Cast ==
- Donatas Banionis — Ilya Nikolaevich Chinkov
- Vladimir Letenkov — Sergey Baklakov
- Yury Sherstnev — Mongolov
- Yevgeny Gerasimov — Zhora Aptratin
- Nina Zasukhina — Lydia Makarovna
- Viktor Adeev — "Doctor" Gurin
- Leonty Polokhov — Kutsenko
- Vladimir Lomizov — Salakhov
- Dmitry Kuznetsov — "The Little One"
- Nikolay Volkov — "The God of Fire"
- Valentin Pechnikov — "Kefir"
- Mikhail Gluzsky — Sidorchuk
- Nikolai Zasukhin — Robykin
- Alexander Tavakai — Kyae
- Zoya Chowdu — daughter of Chiae Tamara
- Elena Melnikova — Lyudochka
