= Bunker, or Scientists Underground =

- Starring: Yevgeny Stychkin; Aleksandra Kulikova; Tomas Motskus; Aleksandr Anurov; Vladimir Bol'shov; Galina Kashkovskaya
- Country of origin: Russia
- No. of episodes: 20

Production
- Running time: 21 minutes

Original release
- Network: TNT
- Release: 27 May 2006

Bunker, or Scientists Underground (Russian: Бункер, или Учёные под землёй, translit. Bunker, ili Uchyonye pod zemlyoy) is a science-fiction mystery television series with comic undertones that was first broadcast on the Russian television network TNT in May 2006.

== Series premise ==
In the year 2012 (a future time when the film was made), an underground laboratory ten kilometres beneath the steppes of Western Siberia is the stage for the top-secret Project BUNKER. Distinguished scientists have been working on a mysterious scientific experiment for the last three years, with a strange, anonymous, and extremely popular erotic manuscript circulating through the complex serving as their only distraction. Now a new researcher has arrived — a veterinarian, despite the lack of animals at the facility — and the scientists already in place are wondering why.

== Performers ==
- Yevgeny Stychkin as Pogov
- Aleksandra Kulikova as Masha
- Tomas Motskus as Vasily
- Aleksandr Anurov as Sergey
- Vladimir Bolshov as Pyotr Petrovich
- Galina Kashkovskaya as Tamara
- Ivan Vyrypaev as Gvidon
