= Kirill Safonov =

Russian actor

Kirill Leonovich Safonov
- Кирилл Сафонов
- Born: 21 June 1973 (age 53); Krasnoyarsk Krai, Russia, Soviet Union
- Occupation: Actor
- Years active: 1997–present

Kirill Leonovich Safonov (Russian: Кири́лл Лео́нович Сафо́нов; born 21 June 1973), is a Russian actor, director, singer, poet and composer.

== Biography ==
Kirill Safonov was born on 21 June 1973 in the East Siberian village Yermakovskoe. Safonov's mother and two sisters currently reside in Ashkelon, Israel.

Safonov spent his childhood years in the Krasnoyarsk region. He attended school in Lviv, Ukraine, where his family moved around the time he was seven years old. His mother, Galina Semenovna, worked as a Director of the Lviv House of Pioneers in the 1980s, which enabled him to attend various clubs and read poetry at concerts. When he was 12 years old, his parents divorced. To help his mother, who had to raise three children on her own, Kirill worked in construction brigades while still in high school.

Kirill wanted to become an actor since his childhood. One of his first roles was the role of a mayor in a school play. After high school, he applied to the faculty of directing in the Cultural Institute of the city of Rivne. Successfully passing the creative rounds, he flunked out on the Ukrainian language test. After the failure with the theatrical institution, Kirill got a job as a seller of paintings in an art exhibition, and painted paintings for sale.

In the early 1990s, Kirill Safonov married to Elena and moved back to Krasnoyarsk, where his family moved back earlier.

In 1993, he enrolled in the theater faculty of the Krasnoyarsk Institute of Arts. After completing the first course, Kirill successfully passed the audition and was transferred to the second course of GITIS (Russian Academy of Theatre Arts), workshop of Andrey Goncharov. In 1997, the young actor was expelled from the fourth year of the Institute.

As a student of GITIS, Kiriill participated in performances of the Theatre of Mayakovsky, which was led by Goncharov. He played the main roles in Children of Vanyushin and The Waltz of the Dogs.

After a falling-out with Goncharov, Safonov moved to the Theater of Stanislavsky, where he participated in productions directed by Vladimir Mirzoev, The Taming of the Shrew and Twelfth Night. In parallel with his work in the theater, the artist was forced to work as a cab driver in order to support his family.

In 1999, following a recommendation by the actor Leonid Kanevsky, the actor was invited to Gesher theater in Israel. He left Russia with his wife Elena and their daughter Anastasia(who was born in 1995), where his mother and sisters, with their families, already lived. Having mastered Hebrew in two months, Kirill played roles in the plays Sea based on Carlo Goldoni's Brawling in Chioggia, The Devil in Moscow based on Mikhail Bulgakov's The Master and Margarita and Mademoiselle Julie by Swedish playwright August Strindberg.

In 2001, Kirill Safonov divorced his wife Elena. Maintaining friendly relations.

A turning point in his career came in 2006. As an already well-known Israeli artist, Safonov came to the Moscow film festival, in a competitive program which included the film Half-Russian Story in which he played one of the leading roles.

During his life in Israel, Kirill starred in films like Dust (2000), This Evening: The Survivor (2002), The Bird Doesn’t Mind (2003), Under the Sign of "Venus" (2004), Half-Russian Story (2006), and others.

Kirill Safonov: I didn't leave Russia permanently, but I wanted to return as a winner, not as a loser. Representing the Israeli film Half-Russian Story, being an Israeli actor, meant victory to me. I decided for myself: wherever I’ll be offered a good job, there I will stay.

After some time, the actor was invited to play the leading role in the TV series Tatiana's Day, after the release of which in 2007, Safonov became incredibly popular in Russia. According to results of the annual 7D rating for 2007, he became the winner of Opening of the Year nomination, for his role as Sergei in Tatiana's Day.

In 2008, Safonov, in duet with Anna Snatkina, recorded the song Two Loves, which was included in the soundtrack of the TV series Tatyana's Day.

The actor has played in theatrical enterprise plays The Postman Always Rings Twice and The Glass Menagerie / Blue Rose.

On 17 April 2010, Kirill Safonov married singer Sasha Savelyeva, after they met in 2009 at a nightclub. The wedding ceremony was held in the Tsaritsyno estate

The actor also wrote poetry, enjoys singing (recorded a solo album Dreams of Gulliver), painting (his works sold at art exhibitions), photography, and outdoor activities

In addition to Russian citizenship, Kirill Safonov has Israeli citizenship. Currently, the actor lives in Moscow. In recent years, he is in high demand as a theater actor.

On 26 June 2016, Kirill Safonov presented his debut film The Fourth, in the competition of short films at the Moscow International Film Festival.

Later this year, at the Golden Phoenix Film Festival for his short film The Fourth, Kirill Safonov received the Ruby Phoenix Debut Prize named after Yuri Gagarin.

== Personal life ==
- His first wife — Elena. The marriage lasted from 1991 to 2001. After the divorce, the former spouses have kept friendly relations.
  - Daughter — Anastasia (born 1995), lives with her mother in Israel.
- Second wife — Alexandra Savelieva, Russian singer, soloist of the pop group Fabrika. Since 2010. 27 March 2019 the couple had a son.

== Selected filmography ==
- 2000: Dust as episode
- 2002: This Evening: The Survivor as Andzhej Rubinshtejn
- 2003: The Bird Doesn't Mind as episode
- 2006: Half-Russian Story as Roman
- 2006: Bad Girls | Yeladot Ra'ot as episode
- 2007: Apocalypse Code as FSB operative
- 2007: Vera’s Crisis as Anton
- 2007: Thank You For Your Love as Lyonya
- 2007-2008: Tatiana’s Day as Sergei Nikiforov
- 2008: My Autumn Blues as Maksim
- 2009: Backwater District as Dmitry Zorin
- 2011: How I Met Your Mother as Vlad, Alina’s rich lover
- 2011: Bablo as Grigory, businessman
- 2012: Brief Guide To A Happy Life (TV) as Pyotr Alekseevich Shirokov
- 2013: Terms of Contract-2 as Oleg Arhipov
- 2013: Bad Blood as Fyodor Alekseevich Kostomarov
- 2014: Good Hands as Sergej Vladimirovich Ruzhnikov
- 2014: Smile of a Mockingbird as Kirill Valentinovich Kruchinin
- 2015: The New Wife as Gosha
- 2016: Penal as Captain Ignat Belov
