= Kirill Zhandarov =

Russian actor

- Born: Kirill Valerevich Zhandarov; 29 March 1983 (age 43); Lomonosov, RSFSR, USSR
- Occupation: Actor
- Years active: 2003–present
- Spouse(s): Nadezhda Tolubeeva (divorce); Maria Valeshnaya

Kirill Valeryevich Zhandarov (Russian: Кирилл Валерьевич Жандаров; born 29 March 1983) is a Russian actor of theater, cinema and TV. He is a best known for roles in television series The White Guard (as Strashkevich) and Brief Guide To A Happy Life (as Sergey).

== Biography ==
Zhandarov was born on March 29, 1983, in the town of Lomonosov (Petrodvortsovy District of Leningrad).

In 2004, he graduated from the Saint Petersburg State Theatre Arts Academy (SPbGATI, Sergey Parshin course).

In 2004-2005, he worked in Moscow at the Roman Viktyuk Theater. Since 2006, he has been an actor in the Tovstonogov Bolshoi Drama Theater.
