= Locust (2014 film) =

2015 film by Egor Baranov

- Directed by: Egor Baranov
- Screenplay by: Oleg Malovichko
- Produced by: Aleksandr Tsekalo; Konstantin Ernst; Ruslan Sorokin; Ivan Samokhvalov
- Starring: Pyotr Fyodorov; Paulina Andreeva
- Cinematography: Yuri Korobeinikov
- Edited by: Igor Otdelnov
- Music by: Aleksei Aigi; Oleg Chubykin; Ryan Otter
- Production company: Sreda
- Distributed by: Central Partnership
- Release date: June 25, 2014
- Running time: 118 minutes
- Country: Russia
- Language: Russian
- Budget: $2 million
- Box office: $477 167

Locust (Russian: Саранча, romanized: Sarancha) is a 2014 Russian erotic thriller directed by Egor Baranov.

An extended television version aired on Channel One Russia between 13 and 20 of March 2016.

== Plot ==
Artyom and Lera meet at a seaside resort and have a summer fling. He is a simple guy from the province, a hard worker and a poet; she is a Moscow bohemian girl from a rich family whose parents make all important decisions for her.

The summer goes by quickly and they each go back to their own lives. Lera goes back to Moscow to study and build a career for herself. Later, Artyom follows Lera to the capital, but she is not too happy to see him. Lera gets engaged to her father's friend and business partner, Gurevich. An older rich woman, Natalia, becomes interested in Artyom. At first he rejects her, but later he changes his mind and marries her. Later the romantic affair between Lera and Artyom is resumed and culminates in a series of brutal murders.

== Cast ==
- Pyotr Fyodorov as Artyom
- Paulina Andreeva as Lera
- Dmitri Shevchenko as Gurevich
- Yekaterina Volkova as Natalia
- Evgeniya Dmitrieva as Irina
- Maksim Pinsker as Valentin
- Oleksiy Gorbunov as Kavtorang
- Aleksander Golubkov as Marat
- Yevgeny Stychkin as Patsyfik

== Production ==
The film was shot in Moscow and Odessa.
