= Egor Baranov =

Russian film director

- Born: December 3, 1988 (age 37); Yekaterinburg
- Education: VGIK
- Occupations: film director, screenwriter, producer

Egor Baranov (Russian: Егор Баранов; born December 3, 1988, in Yekaterinburg) is a Russian film director. In 2006, he entered the All-Russian State Institute of Cinematography for directing faculty, studied in the studio of Sergei Solovyov and Valery Rubinchik. In 2018, he graduated from the university with a red diploma.

In 2012, Baranov published his directorial debut, Suicide, with Yevgeny Stychkin, Alexey Vorobyov and Oksana Akinshina.

Thriller Locust appeared on the Russian screens in 2015. In the lead roles were involved Paulina Andreeva and Pyotr Fyodorov. In 2015, a series was released from the producers Alexander Tsekalo and Alexander Kott Fartsa, created by Egor Baranov, as well as the Japanese Orthodox Western that he shot with the participation of Cary-Hiroyuki Tagawa and Ivan Okhlobystin Priest-San.

In 2016, Egor filmed the psychological series Sparta with Artyom Tkachenko and Alexander Petrov, and in 2017 the premiere of his mystical film Gogol. The Beginning with Alexander Petrov in the title role, the first of the film series Gogol.

== Filmography ==
- Suicides (2012)
- Nightingale the Robber (2012)
- Locust (2013)
- Priest-San (2015)
- Fartsa (TV series) (2015)
- Gogol. The Beginning (2017)
- Gogol. Viy (2018)
- Gogol. Terrible Revenge (2018)
- Sparta (2018)
- The Blackout (2019)
