= Vladimir Kott =

Russian film and theatre director

Vladimir Konstantinovich Kott (Russian: Владимир Константинович Котт; born February 22, 1973) is a Russian film and stage director, screenwriter, film editor and producer, involved in over 60 works. He is the twin of the Russian film director Alexander Kott.

He is a signatory of a 2022 open letter of the Union of Russian Cinematographers against the Russian Invasion of Ukraine.

== Selected filmography ==
- 2008: The Fly; director, screenwriter
- 2011: Gromozeka; director, screenwriter
- 2013: Pyotr Leschenko. Everything That Was...; director, screenwriter
- 2017: Thawed Carp, director
- 2022: Disobedient; director, screenwriter
- 2022: Disobedient 2, sequel; director, screenwriter
- 2023: Disobedients, sequel; director, screenwriter

== Awards ==
- 2005: Several awards for his student's short The Door
- 2008, 2009: several awards for the film The Fly, including the Best Film award at the 2008 Shanghai International Film Festival
- 2011: for Gromozeka:
  - Audience Award at the London Russian Film Festival
  - Best directing FilmFestival Cottbus - Festival of East European Cinema, Cottbus (Germany)
  - Audience Award FilmFestival Cottbus - Festival of East European Cinema, Cottbus (Germany)
  - First prize Honfleur Russian Film Festival, Honfleur (France)
