= Yekaterina Volkova (actress and singer) =

Russian actress and singer (born 1974)

- Екатерина Волкова
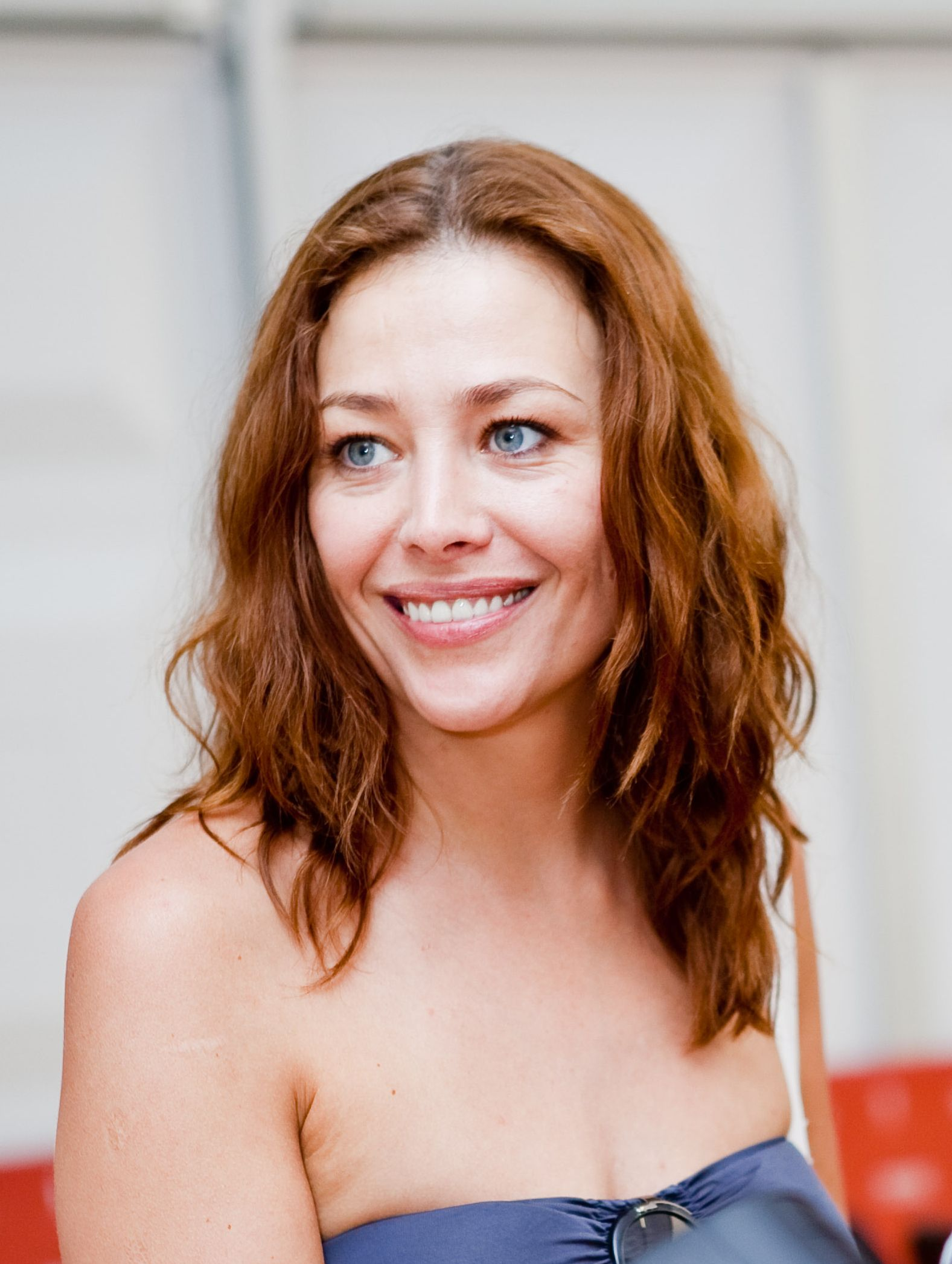
- Volkova in 2013
- Born: 16 March 1974 (age 52); Tomsk, Russian SFSR, Soviet Union
- Occupations: Actress; singer
- Years active: 1992–present
- Height: 1.66 m (5 ft 5 in)
- Spouses: Aleksei (divorced); Sergei Chilyants (divorced); Eduard Limonov (m. 2006; div. 2008)
- Children: 3

Yekaterina Yuryevna Volkova (Russian: Екатерина Юрьевна Волкова; born 16 March 1974) is a Russian actress of theatre and cinema, singer, songwriter, and model.

== Biography ==
Volkova was born in the city of Tomsk, the Russian SFSR, Soviet Union. She grew up in the city of Tolyatti, Samara Oblast.

== Career ==
In 1992, Volkova appeared in the film Eastern Roman.

== Personal life ==
She was married to Eduard Limonov. From this marriage, she has a son, Bogdan (born 2006), and daughter, Aleksandra (born 2008). The couple later divorced.

== Filmography ==
Year	Title	Role	Notes
1992	Eastern Roman	daughter	
1992	The third double	Zina Vituhova	
2001	Collector	Masha	
2002	Next 2	Olga Kirsanova	TV series
2003	Next 3	Olga Kirsanova	TV series
2003	Instructor	Rita	TV series
2003	People shadow 2. An optical illusion	Tanya	TV mini-series
2003	About Love	Nyuta	
2005	KGB in a tuxedo	Valentina Maltseva	TV series
2006	Inhale-Exhale	Vera	
2006	Alive	Slavik's wife	
2006	Captain's Children	Nina Soboleva	TV series
2008	Klinch	Anna Pogodina	TV
2008	My autumn blues	Varya	TV
2009	2-Assa-2	Adelaide	
2010	Goddess of justice	Evgeniya	TV mini-series
2010	Such ordinary life	Larisa Ageeva	TV series
2011	Retribution	Aleksandra	TV series
2011	Natural Selection	Olga Korobova	TV series
2011	Pandora	Elena Vityaeva	TV series
2011	Brief Guide To A Happy Life	Polina	TV series
2012	Equation of Love	Mira	TV series
2012	Atonement	Professor's wife	
2013	While still alive	Angela	
2013	Sex, coffee, cigarettes	Frivolous Woman (segment "Father")	
2013	Syndrome Chess Player	Marina Nikolaeva	TV mini-series
2013	Schuler	Ekaterina Andreevna	TV series
2014	Wind in the face	Alla	TV series
2014	Time to collect	Olga	TV
2014	Homeward	Larisa	TV series
2014	Goodbye, boys	Anna	TV series
2015	Locust	Natalya	
2015	Homeland	Kristina	
2015	Women in Love	Ekaterina	TV series
2015	Fartsa	Valerya Lanskaya	TV series
2015	Spider	Aleks Petrova	
2015	Male call	Inna	
2015	Communal	Anna Saburova	TV mini-series
2015	Value	Elena	Short
2016	Night guards (Wings)	Mama Pasha Smolnikov	
2020	Call-center	Toma	TV series
