= Pyotr Fyodorov =

Russian actor (born 1982)

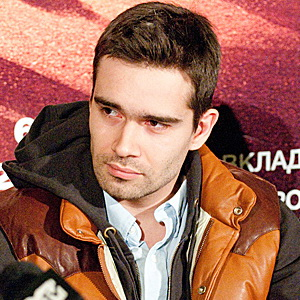
- Fyodorov in 2011
- Born: Pyotr Petrovich Fyodorov; 21 April 1982 (age 44); Moscow, Russian SFSR, Soviet Union
- Education: Boris Shchukin Theatre Institute
- Occupations: Actor, producer, screenwriter
- Years active: 2000–present
- Parent: Pyotr Evgenievich Fedorov

Pyotr Petrovich Fyodorov (Russian: Пётр Петрович Фёдоров, born 21 April 1982) is a Russian actor. He is known for playing the role of Guy Gaal in The Inhabited Island, Gromov in Stalingrad and Yakovlev in The Duelist.

== Biography ==
Fedorov was born on 21 April 1982 in Moscow into a family of actors. His father, Pyotr Evgenievich Fedorov (1959–1999), was a Soviet and Russian theater and film actor, art critic and television presenter who died of cancer at the age of 39. His grandfather, Yevgeny Fyodorov (1924–2020), was a Soviet and Russian theatrical actor, "Honored Artist of the RSFSR", and artist of the Vakhtangov State Academic Theater.

Pyotr spent his childhood in the Altai, Uimon Valley. He was fond of drawing and wanted to become an artist. The eight-grader moved with his family to Moscow. In 1997, after receiving an incomplete secondary education, he entered the Moscow Theater Art Technical School (MTTU), after which he planned to enter the Stroganov Moscow State University of Arts and Industry, but after his father's death changed his decision and left the school after the second year of training.

In 1999, he entered the acting department of the Boris Shchukin Theatre Institute. In 2003 he graduated from the institute. He played a student Belyaev in the graduation performance "Beautiful People" based on the play of Ivan Turgenev, where actors Grigory Antipenko and Olga Lomonosova were also engaged. In September 2003, the performance "Beautiful People" won the prize of the newspaper Moskovskij Komsomolets as the best performance of the season in the nomination "Beginners".

After graduating from the Theater Institute, he served at the Moscow Stanislavsky Drama Theater.

His first major role in film was of Lyonka in 101 km (2001), directed by Leonid Maryagin. Pyotr received wide popularity when he played Danila in the popular teen television series Club (2006), which became the most successful and rated project in the history of the television channel MTV Russia. After the third season, Pyotr left the project and began preparing for the shooting in the sci-fi film directed by Fyodor Bondarchuk Dark Planet (2008) based on the novel of the same name by Arkady and Boris Strugatsky.

In 2009, Pyotr appeared in one of his most significant projects at that time – Russia 88, a Russian pseudo-documentary film drama directed by Pavel Bardin about the youth subculture of the white power skinheads. It premiered 59th Berlin International Film Festival in the "Panorama" section.

In 2011 Pyotr acted in the film The PyraMMMid directed by Eldar Salavatov. The plot is based on the novel of the same name by Sergei Mavrodi, founder of the pyramid scheme MMM.

Fyodorov played the lead role in the film Stalingrad made in 2013 by director Fyodor Bondarchuk which broke box-office records for Russian films upon its release.

In the successful New Year comedies Yolki 2 (2011) and Yolki 3 (2013), Pyotr Fyodorov played Nikolai Kravchuk.

He played a supporting role in the 2014 film Territory by Aleksandr Melnik, a screen version of the novel of the same name by Oleg Kuvaev, which tells of the discovery of a gold-bearing deposit in the late 1950s of the 20th century.

In 2016, he had lead roles in the adventure-drama The Duelist and the disaster film The Icebreaker.

== Filmography ==
=== Film ===
| Year | English title | Original title | Role |
|---|---|---|---|
| 2000 | DMB | ДМБ | Conscript |
| 2001 | 101st Kilometer | 101-й километр | Leonid |
| 2004 | Dasha Vasilieva, Fan of Private Investigation | Даша Васильева, любительница частного сыска | Roman Vinogradov |
| 2004 | Jacked$ | Сматывай удочки | Max |
| 2005 | Velvet Revolution | Мужской сезон: Бархатная революция | Oper |
| 2005 | Unmanaged Skid | Неуправляемый занос | Oleg |
| 2008 | Dark Planet | Обитаемый остров | Guy Gaal |
| 2009 | Dark Planet: Rebellion | Обитаемый остров: Схватка | Guy Gaal |
| 2009 | Russia 88 | Россия 88 | Sasha "Shtyk" |
| 2010 | The Phobos | Фобос. Клуб страха | Mike |
| 2011 | Gop-Stop | гоп-стоп | Vasyanya |
| 2011 | Bullet Collector | Собиратель | Syoma |
| 2011 | The PyraMMMid | ПираМММида | Anton |
| 2011 | Yolki 2 | Ёлки 2 | Nikolai Kravchuk |
| 2011 | The Darkest Hour | самый темный час | Anton Batkin |
| 2011 | Boris Godunov | борис годунов | Basmanov |
| 2011 | Without Men | Без мужчин | Kolya Volkov |
| 2012 | Moms | мамы | Anton |
| 2012 | A Man With A Guarantee | Мужчина с гарантией | Vitaly |
| 2013 | Stalingrad | Сталинград | Capt. Gromov |
| 2013 | Rehearsals | репетиции | Fedor Petrov |
| 2013 | Yolki 3 | Ёлки 3 | Nikolai Kravchuk |
| 2013 | Classmates: Click for Luck | Одноклассники.ру: НаCLICKай удачу | Alexey |
| 2014 | Locust | Саранча | Artyom |
| 2014 | Runaways | Беглецы | Pavel Nechaev |
| 2015 | Territory | Территория | Dyadya Kostya |
| 2015 | The Dawns Here Are Quiet | А зори здесь тихие... | Foreman. Fedot Evgrafovich Vaskov |
| 2015 | Paws, Bones & Rock'n'roll | Ёлки лохматые | Nikolai "Kolya" Kravchuk |
| 2015 | Rodina | родина | Makar |
| 2015 | Priest San: Samurai Confession | Иерей-сан. Исповедь самурая | Pyotr Eremin |
| 2016 | Vacant: Life of a Chef | Вакантна жизнь шеф-повара | Andrey |
| 2016 | Mortal Affair | Чистое искусство | Andrey |
| 2016 | Duelist | Дуэлянт | Yakovlev/Kolyshev |
| 2016 | Her Name Is Mumu | Её звали Муму | Grisha |
| 2016 | The Icebreaker | Ледокол | Andrei Petrov |
| 2019 | The Blackout | Аванпост | Yuriy Grubov |
| 2020 | Sputnik | Спутник | Konstantin Veshnyakov |
| 2021 | Don't Heal Me | Не лечи меня | Vadim |
| 2021 | The Pilot. A Battle for Survival | Лётчик | Nikolai Komlev |
| 2022 | Our Kids | наши дети | Ivan Fyodorov |
| 2025 | There | Туда | Vadim |

=== Television ===
| Year | Title | Original title | Role | Notes |
|---|---|---|---|---|
| 2002 | Moscow Region Elegy | Подмосковная элегия | Vitya | TV movie |
| 2004 | Count Krestovsky | граф Крестовский | Timur | TV series |
| 2006 | Stealing Tarantino | Взять Тарантино | Maks Bogushev | TV series; 8 episodes |
| 2006 | The Club | клуб | Danilla Orlov | TV series; 1 episode |
| 2011 | Diamond Hunters | Охотники за бриллиантами | Anatoly "Bes" Bessonov | TV series; 7 episodes |
| 2012 | The Last Fight | Последний бой | Andrei | TV mini series |
| 2012 | Odessa-Mama | одесса-мама | | TV series |
| 2014 | War and Myths | Война и мифы | | TV series |
| 2016 | Angel's Heart | сердце ангела | Slavik Ilinsky | TV series |
| 2015−2016 | Sarancha | саранча | | Mini series; 4 episodes |
| 2017 | You All Infuriate Me | Вы все меня бесите | Kirill Vitalievich | 20 episodes |
| 2017 | The Departed | ГОРОД | Rodion Stotskiy | TV series |
| 2018 | Sirens | Русалки | Matvei | 16 episodes |
| 2020 | Territory | территория | | |
| 2020 | Dead Mountain | Перевал | Oleg Korstin | 4 episodes |

== Producer ==
- Per rectum
- Blood
- Robotrip
- Siberia - Bottomless Vial of Wishes (clip)
- From the Forest by Сlick-Boutique
- RACE TO SPACE - Endless Dream
- RACE TO SPACE - Is This Home (feat.Victor Gorbachev)
