= Artyom Tkachenko =

Russian film and theater actor (born 1982)

- Артём Ткаченко
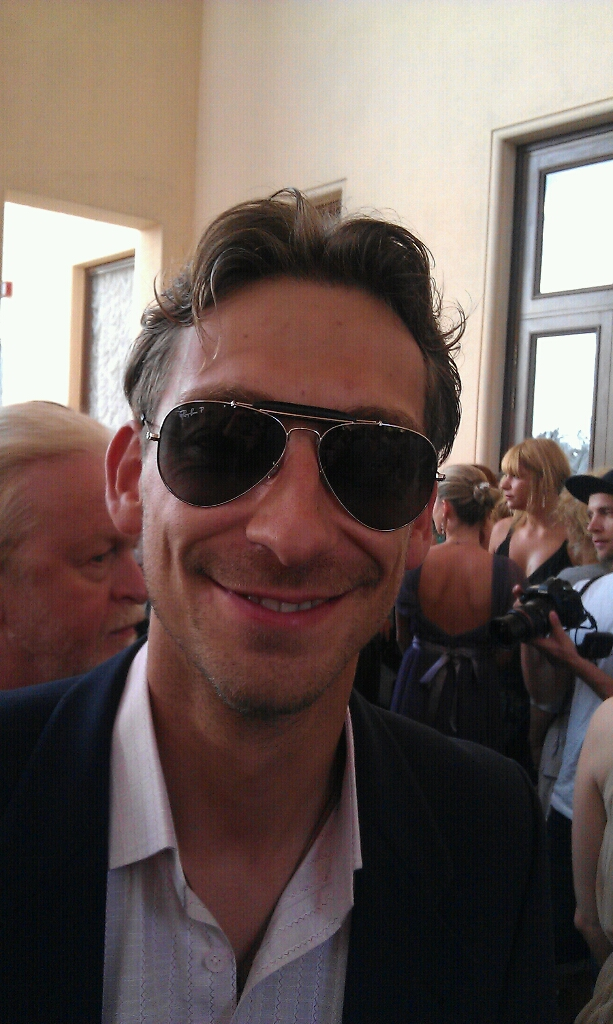
- Born: Artyom Valeryevich Tkachenko; April 30, 1982 (age 44); Kaliningrad, RSFSR, USSR
- Education: Mikhail Shchepkin Higher Theatre School
- Occupation: Actor
- Years active: 2004–present

Artyom Valeryevich Tkachenko (Russian: Артём Валерьевич Ткаченко; born April 30, 1982) is a Russian film and stage actor.

== Biography ==
He engaged in the theater studio under the direction of Boris Beinenson. After school he entered the Mikhail Shchepkin Higher Theatre School. Between 2003 and 2005 he worked in the troupe Shalom Theater. He played in such performances as Wandering Stars, Half of New York to Me Now Relatives and others.

In the film — since 2004.

Since September 2017 is the face of the television channel AXN Sci Fi in the territory of the CIS.

== Personal life ==
- His first wife — Ravshana Kurkova, actress (2004–2008)
- Second wife — Eugenia Khrapovitskaya, model, aspiring actress (2012–2015)
  - Son Tikhon (born January 23, 2013)
- Since 2015 he lives with Ekaterina Steblinа. Son Stepan (born November 7, 2016).

== Filmography ==
- 2004 — Don't Even Think! Independence Play as Bely
- 2005 — Dream On as Shnek
- 2006 — Filipp's Bay as Kostya
- 2006 — Insatiable as Riga
- 2006 — The Sword Bearer as Sasha / Swordsman
- 2007 — The Russian Triangle as Kolya Vorontsov
- 2007 — Waiting for a Мiracle as a passerby
- 2007 — Don Juan's Confession as Monk
- 2007 — Relatives and Friends as Kirill
- 2008 — Indigo as Pavel Maksimovich Soshin
- 2008 — Little Moscow as Sayat
- 2009 — Petrovka, 38 as senior lieutenant
- 2010 — Cherry Jam as geek
- 2010 — The Sky in Fire as Kostya Maretsky
- 2010 — Gift of Destiny as Stas
- 2011 — To smithereens as Eric
- 2011 — Guys from Mars as Kolya
- 2011 — The Life and Adventures of Mishka Yaponchik as Rzhevskij-Rajewski
- 2011 — Celestial Family as Artyom
- 2011 — Aliens Wings as Maretsky
- 2012 — Cinderella as Alexey Korolevich
- 2012 — Dragon Syndrome as Pan
- 2012 — Latest Romans as Armen
- 2012 — Southern Nights as Victor
- 2012 — Barbara (was not completed)
- 2012 — May Rain as Denis Pankratov
- 2013 — Courier of the Paradise as Andrey
- 2013 — Butterflies as Igor
- 2013 — Cesar as Alexey Govorkov
- 2013 — Alien War as Edvard Kozlovsky
- 2013 — Complex Usefulness as Maxim
- 2013 — Kukushechka as guy in the bank
- 2014 — Fotograf as Grisha
- 2014 — Alyoshkа's Love as Roman
- 2014 — Fort Ross as Kondraty Ryleyev
- 2014 — Friends From France as Victor
- 2015 — The Red Queen as Lev Barsky
- 2016 — Love as a Natural Disaster as Ruslan
- 2016 — Drunken Firm as Ruslan
- 2017 — Gogol. The Beginning as Alexey Danishevsky
- 2017 — Children For Sale as Kostya
- 2017 — Gogol. Viy as Alexey Danishevsky
- 2017 — 2019[Ekspropriator] as Baron
- 2018 — Sparta as Igor Kryukov
- 2018 — The Alchemist. Elixir Faust as Mark Terentyev, the illegitimate son of Oswald Rayner
- 2018 — Gogol. Terrible Revenge as Alexey Danishevsky
- 2018 — Player as Ilya Igorevich
- 2018 — The Crimean Bridge. Made with Love! as Viktor Felixovich Onegin, PR man
- 2019 — Gogol as Alexey Danishevsky
- 2019 — Abigail as William Garrett
- 2019 — Union of Salvation (film) as Amphelt, polkovnik
- 2020 — One Breath (film) as director of the sports institute
- 2020 --- North Star, Stanislav Rakitin
- 2021 — The Vampires of Midland as Zhan Ivanovich
- 2022 — Raiders of the Lost Library as Max
- 2024 — Commander as Stepan Khachiyants, terrorist
- 2026 — Be Gentle with Yourself as Boris
- 2026 — Deni i Meni v kino!
