= Filipp Avdeyev =

Russian actor and director (born 1991)

- Филипп Авдеев
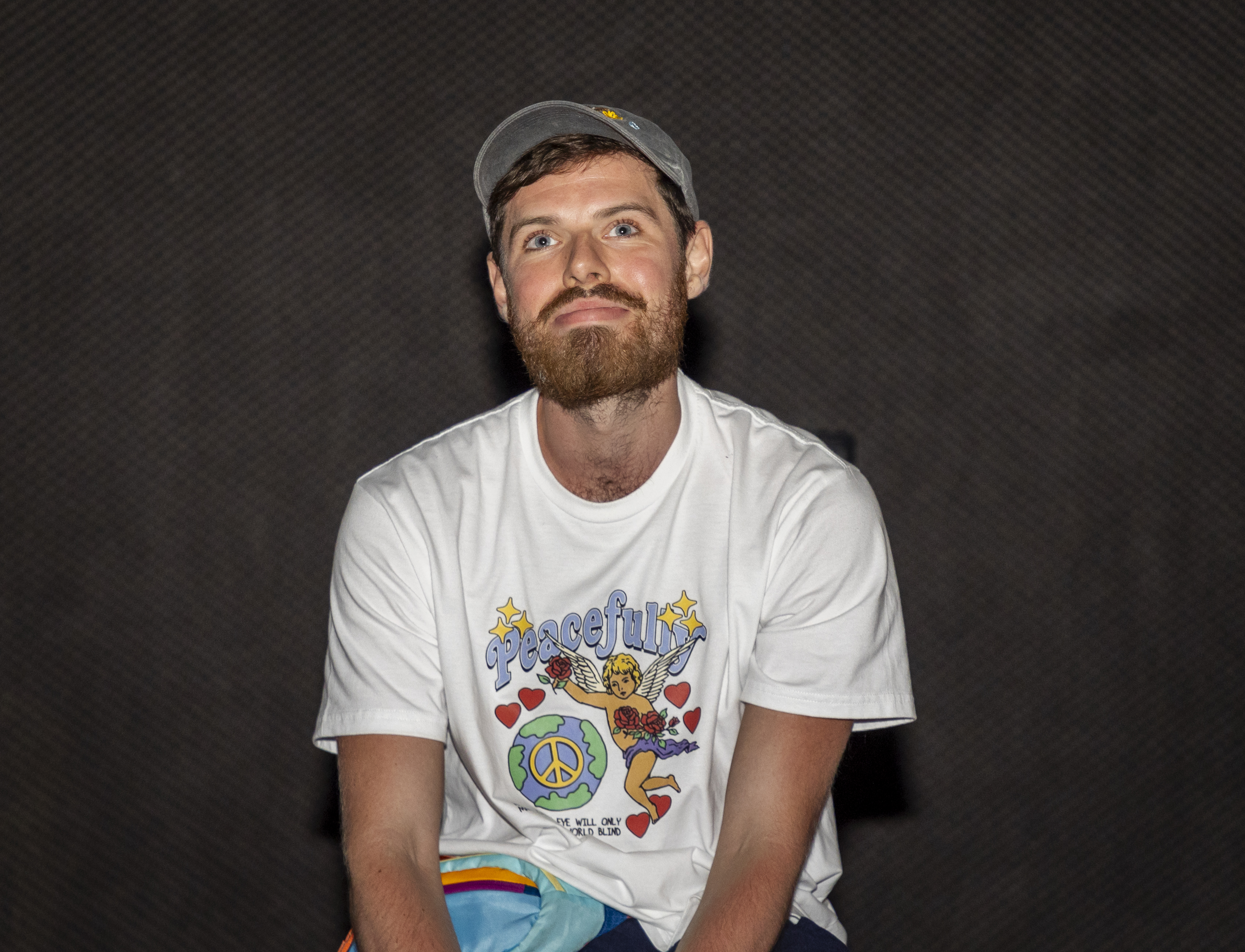
- Born: Filipp Vadimovich Avdeyev; November 10, 1991 (age 34); Moscow, RSFSR, USSR
- Education: Gogol Center
- Occupations: Actor; Theatre director
- Years active: 2003–present

Filipp Vadimovich Avdeyev (Russian: Фили́пп Вади́мович Авде́ев; born November 10, 1991) is a Russian actor and director. A graduate of the Moscow Art Theatre School. Since 2012 he has been an actor at the Gogol Center Theater.

== Biography ==
Filipp Avdeyev was born on November 10, 1991, in Moscow. In 2001 he became a part of the troupe of the musical Nord-Ost, then he played in the Children's Musical Theater of a young actor, Avdeyev children actors played in Yeralash. In 2003 he made his film debut. In 2012 he graduated from the workshop of Kirill Serebrennikov at the Moscow Art Theater School.

== Selected filmography ==
| Year | Title | Role | Notes |
|---|---|---|---|
| 2014 | Corrections Class | Anton Sobolev | |
| 2018 | Leto | Leonid (redirect from Lenya) | |
| 2018 | Acid | Sasha | |
| 2019 | The Blackout | Zhenya | |
| 2020 | Doctor Lisa | Mikhail Savchuk | |
| 2021 | Chernobyl: Abyss | Engineer Valera | |
| 2022 | Dalyokiye blizkiye | Misha | |

== Awards and nominations ==
- 2012 - Theater Award "Golden Leaf"
- 2016 - Parabola Award of the 2016 season
- 2019 - "Golden Mask", nomination "Drama / Male Supporting Role" - play "Little Tragedies", "Gogol Center", Moscow
- 2019 — OK! Magazine Award “More than stars / Main character. Theater"
- 2020 - "Golden Mask", nomination "Drama / male supporting role" - the play "Save the Orchid", "Gogol Center", Moscow.
