= The White Guard (TV series) =

- Genre: Historical drama
- Created by: Marina Dyashenko; Sergei Dyashenko; Sergei Snezhkin; Based on the works of; Mikhail Bulgakov
- Written by: Mikhail Bulgakov
- Directed by: Sergei Snezhkin
- Starring: Konstantin Khabensky; Mikhail Porechenkov
- Country of origin: Russia
- Original language: Russian
- No. of seasons: 1
- No. of episodes: 4

Production
- Running time: 65 mins
- Production companies: Russia-1; Non-Stop Production; Lenfilm

Original release
- Network: Russia-1 (2012)
- Release: 3 March – 4 March 2012

The White Guard (Russian: Белая гвардия, romanized: Belaya Gvardiya) is a Russian television series that is based on Mikhail Bulgakov's novel, The White Guard.

== Plot ==
The film tells about the arduous years of the Russian Civil War and portrays the fate of the Turbin family, which falls into a cycle of sad events of the winter of 1918-1919 in Kiev.

The historical background of the film is the fall from power of Ukrainian Hetman Skoropadsky, the capture of Kiev by Ukrainian People's Republic troops, and their subsequent flight under the blows of the Red Army.

The protagonist, Alexei Turbin is a military physician and has seen and experienced a lot during the three years of the First World War. Like tens of thousands of other Russian officers after the Russian Revolution, he finds himself in a situation of complete uncertainty in both political and private life. Many of them go to the service of Hetman Skoropadsky and his moderate regime under the German protectorate since they consider it a lesser evil to the Red Terror that has been noted in Kiev against the officers and the intelligentsia by the Bolsheviks. However, Germany loses the war, Skoropadsky flees with the Germans, and a few Russian officers and junkers (cadets) remain the only force that can stand in the way of Symon Petliura's followers from coming to Kiev.

== Cast ==
- Konstantin Khabensky as Alexei Vasilievich Turbin, military doctor.
- Mikhail Porechenkov as Victor Myshlaevsky, artillery lieutenant
- Yevgeny Dyatlov as Leonid Shervinsky
- Andrei Zibrov as Alexander Bronislavovich Studzinsky
- Yanina Studilina as Anna
- Sergei Brune as Lariosik
- Nikolay Yefremov as Nikolay Turbin
- Kseniya Rappoport as Elena Thalberg
- Sergei Garmash as Kozyr-Leshko, colonel of the Petlyura forces
- Yuri Itskov as Vasilisa (Lisovich), a neighbor of Turbin family
- Fyodor Bondarchuk as Shpolyansky, ensign futurist
- Alexei Serebryakov as Felix Nay-Tours, colonel of the Hussars
- Mariya Lugovaya as Irina Nay-Tours
- Yevgeny Stychkin as second lieutenant of Artillery Stepanov (Karas)
- Sergei Shakurov as Hetman Skoropadsky
- Sergei Barkovsky as Father Alexander, priest
- Kirill Zhandarov as Strashkevich, ensign
- Artur Smolyaninov as Adjutant Boyko
- Ekaterina Vilkova as Julia Reiss
- Yevgeny Yefremov as Wolf
- Vladimir Vdovichenkov as Pleshko, captain
- Yuri Stoyanov as Blokhin, major-general
- Yevgenia Dobrovolskaya as Vanda
- Aleksei Guskov as Malyshev, colonel and commander of mortar squadron
- Ivan I. Krasko as Maxim
- Arthur Vakha as Zamansky
- Igor Vernik as Shchur
- Sergey Trifonov as Bourgeois
- Igor Chernevich as Sergey Thalberg
- Dennis Reyshahrit as cashier in the cinema

It was written by Marina Dyachenko, Sergey Dyachenko, and Sergey Snezhkin. It was directed by Sergei Snezhkin. The screenplay was by Sergei Machilskiy.

The film was shot in St. Petersburg and Vyborg, Leningrad Oblast, with the help of Lenfilm studios.

== Reception ==
The series has received negative comments from all sides, with the alterations of Bulgakov's novel and the actors' acting skills being particularly criticized.

The Ukrainian Culture Ministry decided not to issue distribution licenses for the series and considered it to "show contempt for the Ukrainian language, people and the state," and "some facts are distorted to benefit Russia."

== See also ==
- The Days of the Turbins - a 1976 Soviet film
