= Aleksandr Melnik =

Russian film director (1958–2021)

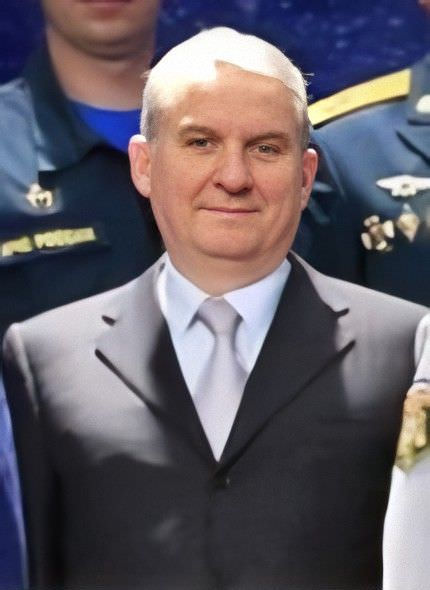
Melnik in 2019

Aleksandr Vladimirovich Melnik (Russian: Александр Владимирович Мельник; 11 June 1958, Chervonopartyzansk – 8 September 2021) was a Russian film director.

== Career ==
Melnik graduated from Odessa Hydrometeorological Institute, and worked for a time as a journalist and publisher. He was a member of the Guild of Russian Filmmakers.

He was the father of film producer Anton Melnik.

== Death ==
Melnik died at the Kitabo-Oron waterfall (Big Irkindinsky waterfall), located in the western part of the Putorana Nature Reserve, 120 km from Norilsk, together with the head of the Ministry of Emergency Situations Yevgeny Zinichev during the scouting of a filming location. Melnik slipped and fell off a cliff into the water. Zinichev died after he dove off the cliff to save Melnik, according to the ministry.

Melnik's funeral service was held at the Church of St. Nicholas in Tolmachi on 11 September 2021, and he was buried later that day in the village of Afineyevo, Moscow Oblast, where he had lived.

== Filmography ==
- Terra Nova (Новая Земля, Novaya Zemlya): film director, screenwriter and producer
- Territory (Территория, Territoriya): film director
