= Yan Tsapnik =

Soviet and Russian theatre and film actor

- Ян Цапник
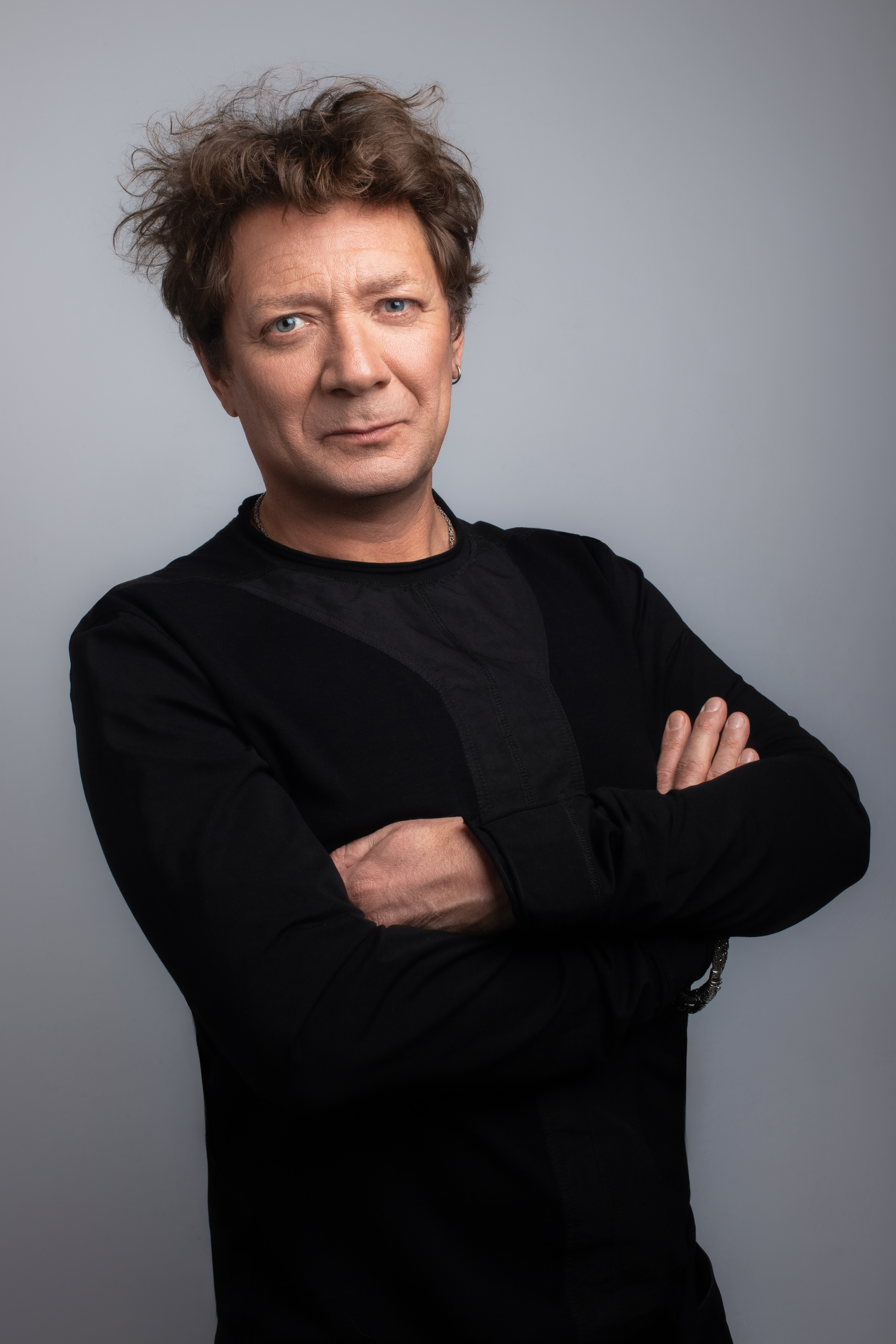
- Born: Yan Yurevich Tsapnik; 15 August 1968 (age 57); Irkutsk, RSFSR, USSR
- Citizenship: Soviet Union; Russia
- Occupation: Actor
- Years active: 1986-present

Yan Yurevich Tsapnik (Russian: Ян Ю́рьевич Ца́пник; born 15 August 1968) is a Soviet and Russian theatre and film actor. Yan has appeared in more than 200 films.

== Biography ==
=== Early life ===
Yan Tsapnik was born in Irkutsk, Russian SFSR, Soviet Union (now Russia).

== Selected filmography ==
Year	Title	Role	Notes
2000	Still Waters	Vlad	
2002	Brigada	Artur Lapshin	
2013	Kiss Them All!	Boris Ivanovich	
2014	Fizruk	Khromulya	
2014	Yolki 1914	Aleksandr Arkadyevich	
2015	Ghost	Gena	
2017	Gogol. The Beginning	Leopold Bomgart	
2018	Gogol. Viy	Leopold Bomgart	
2018	Gogol. Terrible Revenge	Leopold Bomgart	
2019	Leaving Afghanistan	Abdusalamov	
2019	Lev Yashin. The Goalee of My Dreams	journalist	
2020	The Last Minister	Tikhomirov	
2020	Cosmoball	a sports commentator	
2021	Love	Konstantin	
2021	Upon the Magic Roads	Chamberlain of the bedchamber	
2021	A Dog Named Palma	Igor Polsky	
2022	The One	a pilot	
2024	The Enchanted Tinderbox	Zhan	
