= The Blackout (2019 film) =

2019 film directed by Egor Baranov

- Theatrical release poster
- Directed by: Egor Baranov
- Written by: Natalya Dubovaya; Ivan Kapitonov; Svyatoslav Podgaevskiy
- Produced by: Valeriy Fedorovich; Ivan Golomovzyuk; Evgeniy Nikishov
- Starring: Elena Lyadova; Svetlana Ivanova; Pyotr Fyodorov; Konstantin Lavronenko; Aleksey Chadov
- Cinematography: Sergey Trofimov
- Music by: Ryan Otter
- Release dates: 15 March 2019 (Cinequest, San Jose); 21 November 2019
- Running time: 127 minutes
- Country: Russia
- Languages: Russian, English
- Budget: 300.000.000 Ruble; (≃$4 million)
- Box office: $2.8 million

The Blackout (Russian: Аванпост, romanized: Avanpost, lit. 'Outpost') is a 2019 Russian science fiction action thriller film directed by Egor Baranov and starring Pyotr Fyodorov. It had its world premiere at the Cinequest Film & Creativity Festival on 15 March 2019 and was released in the Russian Federation on 21 November 2019. The film is about an event that suddenly plunges the entire world into darkness, rapidly destroying life on Earth except for a small area in Eastern Europe. It received generally mixed reviews from film critics.

== Plot ==
After serviceman Oleg has a date with Alena, everywhere except for the area around Moscow and parts of Belarus, Ukraine and, Finland is plunged into darkness. The fate of billions is unknown. Communications are down, and only a small number of people have survived in the area that becomes known as the Circle of Life. A defensive perimeter is established, and reconnaissance groups fail to return. They find Earth has been attacked, leaving unknown numbers dead. To defend against the unknown enemy, the humans mobilize an army, and outposts are built. One reconnaissance group encounters a hostile, but it evades their gunfire while fleeing.

An outpost loses power, and a massive herd of brown bears attack it. Oleg survives, but his leg is injured. In Moscow, it is revealed some survivors from near the edge of the quarantine zone now have psychic abilities; one of them, Sasha, has a connection to the unknown attackers. A strange figure calling himself Eid comes to Sasha and asks for his help, since Sasha's psychic link can locate Eid's brother Ra, who is behind all this. Four soldiers, led by Marina, attempt to detain Eid, but he convinces Marina to trust him by demonstrating his powerful psychic abilities and offering to help.

Eid explains that his immortal race seeks a new home with a young star. They seeded Earth 200 millennia ago with a genetically engineered warrior race designed to exterminate all intelligent native life. However, the aliens' weapon – humanity – proved more successful than expected, and the aliens have become fearful of them. Ra introduced religion in an attempt to pacify humanity, but it only caused more violence. Now, he is mind-controlling the humans beyond the Circle of Life and seeks to use them to kill all other humans before the alien colony ship arrives. Eid assists Sascha in locating Ra, but Ra learns of Sascha's location too. Eid leaves Sascha at the outpost and leaves with several soldiers, including Zhenya and Marina, to stop Ra. Marina demands they return to pick up Sascha, but a missile strike destroys the outpost. Although outraged by Eid's callous reaction, Marina relents when he says their sacrifice was necessary.

Yura, a soldier on an unrelated reconnaissance mission, rescues a young boy. While being questioned, the boy suddenly murders Yura's lieutenant, and the squad kills the boy. A horde of mind-controlled people attacks the squad. Only Yura and Olya survive. They hijack an abandoned car and attempt to join with another squad. On the way, they meet the surviving outpost soldiers led by Marina and Major Dovlatov. Gathered together, they go to Kirov, where Ra is. They encounter a crowd of people under Ra's control, fight through a skyscraper, climb the roof and find Ra. Eid and Ra fight, and eventually Eid tears out a device from Ra's chest, allowing Yura to thrust a grenade into Ra's chest, killing him.

Eid telepathically kills the remaining drones. Eid says that he will be humanity's new god after they kill the alien colonizers. Zhenya demands to know why Eid did not take action sooner. Eid says that unless humanity were nearly exterminated, the aliens would be wary and harder to defeat. Furious, Oleg confronts Eid, but Yura says they need Eid's help. Zhenya attempts to stab Eid, but Eid fools him into killing Marina. Oleg and Yura fight over whether to serve Eid, and Olya shoots Yura. Oleg shoots Eid. When Oleg becomes confused by a psychic trick, Zhenya sacrifices himself to kill Eid.

An alien ship descends, and a hatch opens. Alena, Olya and Oleg enter the alien ship and find the aliens are in cryostasis. Countdown timers turn on, and the three break the pipes supplying oxygen, killing the aliens. Upon finding the last tubes, the humans find that they hold the aliens' children, and they decide not to break it. The capsule timers reach zero, the capsules open, and alien children crawl out of their capsules. The humans drop their weapons on the floor.

== Cast ==
- Kseniya Kutepova as Osmolovskaya
- Svetlana Ivanova as Olya
- Pyotr Fyodorov as Yura
- Konstantin Lavronenko as Mayor Dolmatov
- Aleksey Chadov as Oleg
- Lukerya Ilyashenko as Alena
- Filipp Avdeyev as Zhenya
- Ilya Volkov as Ra
- Artyom Tkachenko as Eid
- Sergey Godin as Lavrin
- Anastasiya Venkova
- Aleksandr Nedorezov as Spetsnazovets
- Angelina Strechina as Katia

== Production ==
Initially, the film was conceived as a series, but the creators had only the script of the first series. When this series was filmed, Egor Baranov made some changes to the history. After the first series was shot, it became clear that the changes in the script slightly change the intonation and direction of the plot. After that, it was decided to move the script in a slightly different direction. Baranov claims that his film is more anti-war, since he did not try to show the strength of the military, in contrast to films like Transformers and Top Gun. In the film, about 70% of the total timing is done using computer graphics.

=== Filming ===
According to Baranov, they worked on the filming of the full film for about six months, and sometimes about a year. On the set of the film, real soldiers with the latest military equipment were involved, who agreed to star in this film, offering only small tips and advice for scenes with their participation. At the same time, the military themselves did not interfere in the script of the film. Filming was completed in May 2019.

== Music ==
Released as a part of the film's official soundtrack, the song "fine" was released by American musician Mike Shinoda on 31 October 2019. Shinoda has also released a music video for the song on 3 December, which includes scenes from the film.

== Release ==
The film had its world premiere at the Cinequest Film & Creativity Festival in San Jose, California, on 15 March 2019. Its release in Russia took place on 21 November 2019, and on 26 November it was announced that the film would also be released in the USA and in two dozen other foreign countries. It was released on VOD as The Blackout: Invasion Earth by Shout! Factory on 29 May 2020.

=== Marketing ===
The film was presented by Premier Studios at Comic-Con Russia 2019 along with the film Caramora and the film adaptation of Metro 2033. The Blackout is the only film from Russia included in the program of the American festival Cinequest, combining cinema and high technology. On 20 August 2019, Mir Fantastiki magazine acted as the media partner of this film. On 23 October 2019, the filmmakers, together with Premier Studios, together with MY.GAMES launched the Warface Special Invitational Season 2: Outpost tournament, which combines the world of Warface with this film.

== Reception ==
=== Box office ===
The Blackout grossed $2.8 million worldwide, against a production budget of about $4 million.

=== Home rentals ===
In the first week of rental, the film was able to collect only about 100 million rubles (≃$1.3 million) by the end of the weekend. By late November, early December, fees amounted to about 144 million rubles.

=== Critical response ===
The film holds a 57% approval rating on review aggregator Rotten Tomatoes, based on 7 reviews, with an average of 5.3/10. Stanislav Zelvensky gave the film 2.9 stars out of 10. Vladislav Shuravin of film.ru gave the film 4 stars out of 10. Pavel Voronkov, in his review of the film for Gazeta.Ru, lamented its running time as overlong, calling it "painfully, criminally, inhumanly drawn out", and wrote that "the flow of entrails and guts will tire, perhaps, even the most bloodthirsty militarist." Sergey Ageev, who wrote a review for fatcatslim.ru, praised The Blackout for its effects and action sequences, but criticized the film's script as "very, very bland", called the acting "lousy" and the plot "ridiculous".

== Video game ==
On 7 November 2019, a browser game was launched, the main feature of which is integration with Google Maps. In the application window, the user can enter any address (or simply indicate the city) and see how his native streets will change in the ensuing post-apocalypse in the universe of this film. In the game there is also elements of a shooter, since the main task in the game will be cleaning the streets from aliens.

== TV series ==
The movie was re-released in October 2020 as 6-episode TV version on TV-3 channel.
