= Gogol. Viy =

- Directed by: Egor Baranov
- Written by: Alexey Chupov; Natalya Merkulova
- Produced by: Alexander Tsekalo; Artur Janibekyan; Valeriy Fyodorovoch; Evgeniy Nikishov
- Starring: Alexander Petrov; Evgeniy Stychkin; Artem Suchkov
- Cinematography: Sergei Trofimov
- Music by: Ryan Otter
- Production company: Sreda
- Release date: 5 April 2018
- Running time: 99 minutes
- Country: Russia
- Language: Russian
- Box office: $8 011 641

Gogol. Viy (Russian: Гоголь. Вий) is a 2018 Russian fantasy-horror film directed by Egor Baranov, sequel to the 2017 film Gogol. The Beginning and followed by Gogol. Terrible Revenge.

== Plot ==
After the events of the first film, Nikolai Gogol finds a case: among the things of Yakov Petrovich Guro is a secret file on himself with a postscript: "Mystery of birth — dark?". Five brothers of Gogol died at birth or soon after birth; later, in the visions of Nikolai and the memories of Yakim (who does not dare to reveal the truth to the gentleman), Vasily Gogol-Yanovsky accepts from despair the offer of a stranger with a bandage on his face, covering his nose. The stranger promises that the baby will survive, but payment for this will be an agreement with certain forces; Vasily replies that he is ready for anything, just to not bury his children anymore. When Nikolai is born, the stranger revives the stillborn baby.

=== Chapter Three. Enchanted place ===
In the morning, foreign sorcerer Basavryuk arrives in Dikanka: local people know him and are afraid, because he is famed as a hunter for the souls of Christians. However, there are no grounds for his arrest, and the priest warns Gogol to stay away from him.

When the next girl disappears in Dikanka (Darina) and her search leads to nothing, Gogol notices in Guro's notes a list of dates - church holidays and one victim of the Dark Horseman corresponds to each holiday. In attempts to find Darina, Gogol tries to learn how to control her gift and sees a red flower in the "den of the beast." Not knowing how to interpret the vision, he finally accepts Oksana's help; her condition - Nikolai must belong to her. The flower turns out to be a blossom, blooming once a year, where the magic of gold is hidden. It's only the innocent soul that can break it and get hold of the treasure if it spills the blood of another innocent.

"The lair of the beast" is the Bear's ravine, which the locals pass by, believing that this is a damned land. In the visions, Nikolai foresees that there will be a murder, and an unknown girl asks him a question: "Maybe you are my betrothed?". Taking the gun, Gogol goes there at night, but instead of the Horseman, Darina is brought there by the sorcerer. He proposes the fiancé of Darina's sister to shed blood so that he will receive gold (and become rich to marry), and the sorcerer will take his soul. When he agrees, Nikolai, unable to dissuade the villains, kills him, and the sorcerer disappears. Wounded Darina is saved Dr. Leopold Bomgart who exerts great efforts: although he has committed to operate on the living after he failed to save a child in the past, the doctor finds the courage to try again and he succeeds.

However, it is impossible to prevent the killing of the new victim of the Horseman: she is the second girl from visions. Nothing is left for Gogol, Bomgart, Yakim, blacksmith Vakula and investigator Binh, except to wait for the next holiday.

=== Chapter Four. Viy ===
On a new holiday, Gogol advises Binh to urge residents of Dikanka not to leave the houses at night. Although the night passes without new victims, the next morning seven houses are marked with the sign of the Horseman. What's unusual is that they also marked the Danishevskys' house, although the Dark Horseman had never touched noblemen before and killed only peasants. Not seeing other options, Nikolai suggests to hide all the girls from the labeled houses in a secret place under the protection of the Cossacks. This proposal does not find support from Binh, since he begins to suspect Gogol of having links to the murderer. Danishevsky also rudely rejects the proposal to take Lisa with him.

Thanks to the little daughter of the blacksmith Vakula, Gogol guesses that the signs on the houses were put by the witch from the village (the signs were painted with the blood of a dog, and in her house the girl saw a dead dog). However, the witch can not be interrogated: she is stabbed by a stranger with an aspen stake, who runs away when Nikolai appears. Waking up at the scene of the murder, Gogol falls under the suspicion of Binh (no one except him saw the killer) and finds on the floor the spell he wrote in Latin.

After studying the evidence and weapons of a stranger (Oksana, scarcely seeing him, says in horror that this is an aspen from the holy land, conspired against the evil forces), Nikolai comes to the conclusion that the murderer intended to perform a ritual over the body, but did not have time to complete it, which means that he will try to finish the deed later. The murderer is really ambushed in a shed, where the witch's body lies; it turns out to be the wandering exorcist Homa Brutus. He arrived in Dikanka to fight again with the demon Viy, and the witch needed him as a bait. Making sure that Gogol is not a murderer, Binh gives the go-ahead to hide the girls.

Khoma, escaping from imprisonment, takes Gogol hostage and asks him to help him defeat Viy: he simply does not have enough strength alone, and only a man with a dark gift strong enough that the spell that casts out the demon would work. Locked in a church with a witch's body and drawing a circle, Homa waits until Viy arrives, but dies. Gogol reads the spell himself, why Viy disappears, but Nikolai himself falls dead.

At night, the Dark Horseman finds a secret place (abandoned farm) and kills all Cossacks and girls inside it. Arriving at the site, Binh and Vakula conclude that someone had revealed the location of the shelter to the Horseman, which only four knew: Binh himself, his assistant (scribe Tesak), Gogol and Alexei Danishevsky. The first thing Binh decides to arrest and interrogate Gogol, but finds him in the church without signs of life.

The film ends with scenes from the sequel, "Gogol. Terrible Revenge": the return of Yakov Petrovich Guro, the funeral of Gogol and the battle with the Dark Horseman.

== Cast ==
- Alexander Petrov — Nikolai Vasilyevich Gogol
- Yevgeny Stychkin — head of the police department, Alexander Khristoforovich Binkh
- Artyom Suchkov — scribe Slasher
- Taisiya Vilkova — Elizaveta (Lisa) Danishevskaya
- Julia Franz — daughter of the miller Oksana
- Yan Tsapnik — doctor-pathologist Leopold Leopoldovich Bomgart
- Eugene — full servant of Gogol Yakim
- Sergey Badyuk — Blacksmith Vakula
- Artyom Tkachenko — Alexey Danishevsky
- Martha Timofeeva — daughter of the blacksmith Vakula Vasilina
- Kirill Polukhin — sorcerer-basurman Basavryuk
- Alexey Vertkov — Homa Brutus
- Ksenia Razina — Ulyana
- Svetlana Kireeva — Khristina
- Valery Rybin — The Dark Horseman
- Yulia Marchenko — Gogol's mother Maria Gogol-Yanovskaya
- Andrey Astrakhantsev — father of Gogol Vasily Gogol-Yanovsky
- Anvar Libabov — noseless
