= Gogol. Origins =

- Directed by: Egor Baranov
- Written by: Tikhon Kornev; Kim Belov; Alexey Chupov; Natalya Merkulova; Alexey Karaulov; Philip Konyashov
- Produced by: Alexander Tsekalo; Artur Janibekyan; Valeriy Fyodorovoch; Evgeniy Nikishov
- Starring: Alexander Petrov; Oleg Menshikov; Yevgeny Stychkin
- Cinematography: Sergei Trofimov
- Music by: Ryan Otter
- Production company: Sreda
- Release date: 31 August 2017
- Running time: 100 minutes
- Country: Russia
- Language: Russian
- Box office: $ 7,757,988

Gogol. Origins (Russian: Гоголь. Начало, romanized: Gogol. Nachalo) is a 2017 Russian fantasy-horror film directed by Yegor Baranov loosely based on works by Nikolai Gogol from the 1832 collection Evenings on a Farm near Dikanka. The title role is played by Alexander Petrov.

Gogol. Origins is the first of three films of the project Gogol and the first Russian television series to have a theatrical release. The first episode (film) was nominated for the Best TV CEE Series award at the Serial Killer festival.

The movie has two sequels: Gogol. Viy and Gogol. Terrible Revenge

== Plot ==
=== Chapter One. Murders in Dikanka ===
The year is 1829. Young Nikolai Vasilievich Gogol, an aspiring writer and judicial clerk in the Third Section of His Imperial Majesty's Own Chancellery in St. Petersburg, suffers seizures in which he experiences visions and writes seemingly meaningless words. The timing of his seizures coincides with acts of murder committed elsewhere.

Gogol meets with famous investigator Yakov Petrovich Guro, who immediately notices his scribbles are valuable clues and quickly finds the murderer. Guro, in turn, supports Gogol who struggles to deal with the harsh reception to his first published book. Learning Guro's next assignment involves the murders of girls in the Poltava province near Dikanka village, Gogol offers to join him as assistant and a clerk, prompted by his vision. Guro consents and they depart.

In Dikanka, Gogol and Guro begin investigating the murder, whose perpetrator is dubbed the Dark Horseman. However, the superstitious population and local investigator Alexander Khristoforovich Binh are uncooperative. Gogol meets Danishevsky, a mysterious landowner who lives in isolation with his wife Elizabeth. Gogol slowly falls for Elizabeth, who admires his creativity.

Oksana (as it turns out later, a rusalka) appears in Gogol's visions and asks for him to help identifying a witch, who drains her strength from drowned women. In return, Oksana offers to help with the investigation. Meanwhile, Guro learns that similar murders took place 30 years ago but were swept under the rug.

During the next vision, Gogol identifies the witch, Hannah from the local inn. At the inn, they find Hannah, who is missing a hand — torn off earlier by Oksana. The witch easily copes with Guro, then attacks Gogol, but Binh kills her. Concluding she is the Horseman, they close the case and prepare to return to St. Petersburg.

Oksana visits Gogol and informs him Hannah was only an accomplice, and the real killer is at large. Meanwhile, the Horseman fights Guro in a burning barn, which collapses, killing Guro. The remains of the Rider are not found. Gogol stays and continues the investigation himself.

That night, the Horseman resurrects Hannah, then proceeds to punish her for her failure.

=== Chapter Two. The Red Cape ===
A new murder occurs in Dikanka: Baba Khavronya dies during a tryst with her lover, the priest. The murder has the telltale signs of the Dark Horseman's work, but Gogol finds some discrepancies. When the murder weapon is found, the husband claims to be the killer.

Dr. Leopold Leopoldovich Bomgart comes to Dikanka. A man with an exclusively scientific mindset, Bomgart denies the existence of evil spirits. An autopsy shows that Khavronya died not from a wound, but from a rupture of the heart due to utmost terror. Khavronya's ghost appears and terrorizes the soon to be wedded stepdaughter Paraska.

Gogol is tormented by visions of Oksana and Elizabeth. According to Oksana, to fully control his gift, he must give up worldly attachments, specifically his feelings for Liza.

Aided by Bomgart and the blacksmith Vakula, Gogol find the cause of death: a candle, laced with hallucinogen, was lit during Khavronya's tryst. It causes terrifying hallucinations drawn from the victims' greatest fear. They realize the culprit is Paraska. As Gogol exposes her, she escapes into the forest.

Khavronya's ghost catches Paraska and offers her to the Horseman as a new sacrifice. The ghost also uses witchcraft to obstruct Gogol, Vakula, Vakula's servant Yakim, and Dr. Bomgart, preventing them from saving Paraska. Dr. Bomgart lights the candle which works on the ghost, who unexpectedly calls Gogol "Dark one" and vanishes in fear. They reach Paraska, but she is already killed by Dark Horseman.

The next morning, Gogol gathers Dr. Bomgart, the blacksmith Vakula and his servant Yakim, the only people he can trust. The three agree to help him in the fight against the terrible enemy. Vakula helps Gogol open a chest bequeathed to him by Guro. When touching the lock Gogol gets a new vision: the next victim of the Dark Horseman could be Liza.

The film ends with Yakov Petrovich Guro, who survived the barn fire, observing Dikanka from a cliff.

== Cast ==
- Alexander Petrov — Nikolai Vasilyevich Gogol
- Oleg Menshikov — investigator Yakov Petrovich Guro
- Yevgeny Stychkin — head of the police department, Alexander Khristoforovich Binh
- Taisiya Vilkova — Elizaveta (Lisa) Danishevskaya
- Artyom Tkachenko — Alexey Danishevsky
- Julia Franz — daughter of the miller, Oksana
- Yevgeny Sytiy— servant of Gogol, Yakim
- Yan Tsapnik — doctor-pathologist Leopold Leopoldovich Bomgart
- Sergey Badyuk — blacksmith Vakula
- Martha Timofeeva — daughter of the blacksmith Vakula Vasilina
- Valery Rybin — Dark Horseman
- Svetlana Kireeva — Khristina
- Artyom Suchkov — scribe Tesak
- Yevgeny Kapitonov — Father Bartholomew
- Pavel Derevyanko — Alexander Pushkin
- Kirill Polukhin — Basavryuk
- Dmitry Bykovsky-Romashov — Solopiy Cherevik
- Anvar Libabov — the noseless
- Yulia Marchenko — Gogol's mother, Maria Hohol-Yanovskaya
- Andrey Astrakhantsev — Gogol's father, Vasyl Hohol-Yanovsky
- Vitaly Kovalenko — investigator Kovleiskiy
- Beata Makovskaya — Khavronya
- Maria Myasnikova — Paraska
- Olga Alberti — girl in a bag

== Production ==
Filming took place in 2016 in the Pskov region and St. Petersburg, where the set of the village of Dikanka was created.

"Gogol. The Beginning" was produced by Alexander Tsekalo's Sreda Production Company, the general director of TV-3 Valery Fyodorovich, the general producer of TV-3 Yevgeny Nikishov (at that time Fedorovich and Nikishov were the producers of TNT) and Artur Janibekyan. The production of one series of "Gogol" cost about 29 000 000 rubles, while the fees of the first part of the film series amounted to 444,485,278 rubles.

== Critical response ==
Vasily Stepanov noted in his review for the Seans magazine: "Despite the questionable artistic choices and politically incorrect jokes that are hard to resist if you live in Russia, the main problem with Gogol isn't the blandness or salaciousness, but the screen size on which it's released. Everyone seems to understand this except the advertising department, which pushes the film on viewers as a sort of Russian blockbuster (though in reality, viewers are only seeing the first two episodes of a television series)".

== Sequels ==
The film Gogol. Viy was released on April 5, 2018, Gogol. A Terrible Vengeance was released on August 30, 2018. Then the three films will be divided into six episodes. The episodes in question, along with two filler episodes, have been aired on the Russian channel TV-3 in 2019.
