= Yevgeny Stychkin =

Russian actor (born 1974)

- Евгений Стычкин
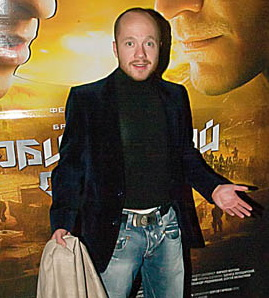
- Yevgeny Stychkin at the premiere in 2009.
- Born: Yevgeny Alekseevich Stychkin; 10 June 1974 (age 52); Moscow, RSFSR, USSR
- Citizenship: Soviet Union; Russia
- Education: Gerasimov Institute of Cinematography
- Occupations: Actor, director
- Years active: 1993–present
- Spouses: Ekaterina Skanavi (div. 2009; 4 children); Olga Sutulova (m. 2012)
- Website: http://www.stychkin.com/

Yevgeny Alekseevich Stychkin (Russian: Евге́ний Алексе́евич Сты́чкин; born 10 June 1974) is a Russian actor and director known for his roles in God Loves Caviar and Trotsky.

== Biography ==
Yevgeny Stychkin was born in Moscow. He graduated from the English special school No. 30. He studied at the All-Russian State University of Cinematography named after S. A. Gerasimov, course A. B. Dzhigarkhanyan and A. L. Filozov. From 1994 until 1995, actor of the Clownery Theater of Teresa Durova.

Starting from the year 1995, he is employed as an actor of the Moon Theater in Moscow. Played in the performances "Proposal" (School of modern plays, dir. I. Raihelgauz), "Fear and Misery of the Third Reich" (Theater "The Cherry Orchard", dir. A. Wilkin), "Mashenka" (Theatrical company of Sergey Vinogradov, dir. S. Vinogradov), "Charlie Cha" (Moon Theater, director, S. Prokhanov), "Seagull" Prize in the "Breakthrough-2000" nomination for the main role, "Faust" (Moon Theater, dir. F. Goifman) and others.

At the moment he cooperates with the theatrical company S. Vinogradov, the Mossovet Theatre, the Theater "School of Modern Play", the Vakhtangov State Academic Theatre.

In 2017 Stychkin was included in the blacklist of Myrotvorets.

In 2021 Stychkin directed television series Contact starring Pavel Maykov. It is his directorial debut.

== Personal life ==
Stychkin's mother is actress and ballet dancer Kseniya Ryabinkina, a former soloist of the Bolshoi Theater.

Yevgeny was married to pianist Ekaterina Skanavi until the year 2009. Has four children; sons Aleksey Stychkin and Lev Stychkin, daughter Aleksandra, illegitimate daughter Sonya (1995). Evgeny Stychkin's current wife is actress Olga Sutulova.

== Selected filmography ==
=== Film ===
- Day of the Full Moon (1999)
- Election Day (2007)
- Attack on Leningrad (2009)
- Alice's Birthday (2009, voice)
- Burnt by the Sun 2 (2010)
- God Loves Caviar (2012)
- Locust (2015)
- Collector (2016, voice)
- Friday (2016)
- Gogol. The Beginning (2017)
- Maximum Impact (2017)
- Beyond the Edge (2018)
- Gogol. Viy (2018)
- Gogol. Terrible Revenge (2018)

=== TV ===
- The First Circle (2006)
- Bunker, or Scientists Underground (2006)
- The White Guard (2012)
- The Dark Side of the Moon (2012)
- Chernobyl: Zone of Exclusion (2014, 2017)
- Locust (2016)
- The Road to Calvary (2017)
- Trotsky (2017)
- Gogol (2019)
- Just Imagine Things We Know (2020)
