= Gogol. Terrible Revenge =

Gogol. A Terrible Vengeance
- Directed by: Egor Baranov
- Written by: Alexander Tsekalo (idea); Alexey Chupov; Natalya Merkulova
- Produced by: Alexander Tsekalo; Artur Janibekyan; Valery Fyodorovoch
- Starring: Alexander Petrov; Oleg Menshikov; Yevgeny Stychkin
- Cinematography: Sergei Trofimov
- Music by: Ryan Otter
- Production company: Sreda
- Release date: 30 August 2018
- Running time: 92 minutes
- Country: Russia
- Language: Russian

Gogol. A Terrible Vengeance (Russian: Гоголь. Страшная месть, romanized: Gogol. Strashnaya mest) is a 2018 Russian fantasy action horror mystery thriller film directed by Egor Baranov and starring Alexander Petrov in the title role. It is the third and the final film in the title trilogy, after Gogol. The Beginning and Gogol. Viy. The film’s plot follows a resurrected Nikolai Gogol (who had died in the last movie) as he continues to try to find and stop the murderous and mysterious Dark Horseman, with the returning help of Inspector Yakov Petrovich Guro (Oleg Menshikov), only to stumble upon a shocking truth. The film was released in Russia and worldwide on August 30, 2018 and has received positive reviews.

== Plot ==
The series begins with cutting frames from Gogol's films. Start and Gogol. Viy: the Arrival of the Dark Rider and killing the first victim of the Horseman, the conversation Yakov Petrovich Guro Gogol about the Rider, first acquaintance Guro Gogol, arrival in Dikanka and familiarity Yakov Petrovich and Guro with Binh, familiarity with Gogol Danishevsky, swinging on the swings at the Oak tree with Lisa, the first murder in Dikanka, the battle of Guro in a burning house with the Rider, opening the chest, Yakov Petrovich, ad special provisions in Dikanka, Vasilina meeting with the witch Uliana, the mavok leaving the pond, the battle with the Wii, the murder of women Rider, the fall of Gogol (lethargy).

=== Chapter five. Rider's Lair ===
Soon after Gogol’s death, Binh names him guilty for the deaths of the Cossacks and the young women at the hands of the Dark Horseman, since he was the one who ordered them to be hidden in the barn. Bomgart is unable to perform a post-mortem analysis on Gogol’s body, while Vakula’s daughter Vasilina (who secretly has magic abilities) proclaims denial about Gogol’s demise.

Gogol’s body is buried at Dikanka’s graveyard, with Binh, Vakula, Bomgart, and Lisa presiding. Gogol awakens in the afterlife, where he meets his father and a noseless and bandaged man. The man tells Gogol "Live, Dark One.", resurrecting him. Gogol manages to get out of the coffin while the appalled crowd looks on. Gogol is soon arrested by Binh, who presumes him as the Dark Horseman, and locked him up at the police headquarters. Yakim is also willingly locked up. He reveals to Gogol that the man who resurrected him was a man with ties to his family’s past; At the time of Gogol’s birth, his father was acquainted with the man. When Gogol’s mother gave birth to him, he was stillborn. However the man managed to resurrect the child, and the story was kept secret from Gogol. Meanwhile, Alexey meets Oksana (whom he is able to see) and offers her to keep Gogol away from Dikanka in exchange for bringing her back to life.

Villagers suddenly attack the headquarters, subduing Binh, Yakim and Binh’s assistant. They attempt to burn Gogol at the stake, but Vasilina uses her abilities to create rain, saving Gogol. The villagers then try to hang Gogol, when their leader is suddenly shot in the leg. The shooter reveals himself to be Yakov Petrovich Guro, who survived the Dark Horseman’s attack as seen in the first chapter. He tells the mob to disperse, threatening them with execution and exile to Siberia, which they do. Guro reveals to Gogol that he has been manipulating the events after his presumed death in his attempt to find the real Dark Horseman. Gogol reveals that he suspects Alexei as the Horseman. As a result, Gogol, Guro, and Binh decide to search Alexei’s estate. At first, they are unable to find anything, but Gogol uses his visions to find the handle which opens a passage behind the fireplace. They go through the passage, discovering a cave. Inside they find Oksana with water gushing out of her mouth, a sign that she is being resurrected. Alexei suddenly appears, and Binh shoots him dead in the chest, surprising everyone as the Dark Horseman could not be taken down easily. Oksana suddenly comes to life, only to be killed seconds later by the Horseman, who absorbs her blood, creating a vortex. When the vortex recedes, the trio are appalled to see Lisa, revealing her to be the Dark Horseman.

=== Chapter six. Terrible Vengeance ===
The events of the present time and 163 years ago are shown in parallel.

163 years before the principal events of the film, the Cossack ataman is sent to repulse the Polish invaders led by sorcerer Kazimierz. Only one Cossack comes back from the whole army, saying that the Poles have broken them, the ataman was killed, and they will soon attack. The daughters of the ataman, Liza and Maria, turn to the sorceress-hermit, and she says that the Polish sorcerer can be defeated by wearing a tongued hoop: then Kazimir will lose his power and become mortal, but the price for his murder will be terrible. Nevertheless, Lisa and Maria, having crept into Casimir's tent, seize him and take him away to be surrendered. Along the way Kazimir says that his curse ends only when he loves someone, and asks Maria to let him go: if she answers him in return, he will be able to renounce witchcraft and become a man. Lisa decides to finish off the sorcerer on the spot, and enters with Maria in battle, until she falls, stumbling into the abyss. In anger, Liza beheads the Kazimir. However, his still living head tells her that she is now under the same curse and that every thirty years she needs to sacrifice twelve girls and one resurrected, not knowing death, until she falls in love herself. Maria is met in the next world by a fiery voice, telling her to go back: if she kills her sister, she can live, and until then she will wander in the guise of an old woman.

In the present day, Guro fetters Lisa with the same conjured hoop, and during the interrogation confesses that he is not going to bring her to court: on the orders of the secret society, he must deliver the immortal Horseman to St. Petersburg so that he shares the secret of eternal life with the Russian Empire. In case of refusal, he threatens to kill Gogol. After listening to the conversation, Nikolai and Binh rush to stop Yakov Petrovich, and Binh, in order not to let him carry out his plans, shoots at Lisa. Hearing from her that Gogol himself was to be the thirteenth victim, but for his love Lisa spared him and instead killed Oksana - also resurrected - Gogol removes the bewitched hoop, and Liza again becomes an immortal Horseman.

Hardly having coped with Guro, Liza, Gogol and Binh see on the threshold old woman Kristina from the village, which suddenly turns to Maria. She kills Binh and mortally wounds Gogol, and forces Liza to give her immortality to Nicholas, before decapitating her, like her sister did to Casimir. Vasilina, who sensed Gogol being in trouble, manages to save Gogol and Guro by distracting Maria long enough for Gogol to put the hoop around Maria's neck, making her mortal. Impressed, Guro offers membership in a secret society, since his mission was crowned with success, because the immortal is captured. After receiving a refusal, he returns to St. Petersburg. Gogol, along with Bogmart, Valkula and Binh's assistant, bury Binh at Dikanka's graveyard, promising to keep the events that happened here a secret, before departing. Gogol returns home, and inspired by Liza's praise of his work, begins to write a new novel based on his adventures.

In St. Petersburg, Gogol presents his work, titled "Evenings on a Farm Near Dikanka" and receives a standing ovation. He then encounters a witch trying to kill him, but is saved by Pushkin and Lermontov. Having introduced themselves as members of a brotherhood which is at odds with Guro's society, they invite Gogol to join their ranks, and he agrees.

== Cast ==
- Alexander Petrov — Nikolai Vasilyevich Gogol
- Oleg Menshikov — investigator Yakov Petrovich Guro
- Yevgeny Stychkin — Alexander Khristoforovich Binkh
- Artem Suchkov — Slasher
- Taisiya Vilkova — Elizabeth (Lisa) Danishevskaya/Dark horseman
- Julia Franz — Oksana
- Yan Tsapnik — Leopold Leopoldovich Bomgart
- Eugene Sytiy — Yakim
- Artyom Tkachenko — Alexey Danishevsky
- Marta Timofeeva — Vasilina
- Svetlana Kireeva — Christina
- Kirill Zaytsev — Kazimierz Mazowiecki
- Dana Abyzova — Maria
- Anvar Libabov — noseless
- Pavel Derevyanko — Alexander Sergeevich Pushkin
- Askar Nigamedzyanov — Mikhail Lermontov
- Andrey Astrakhantsev — Vasily Gogol—Janovsky, father of Gogol
- Yulia Marchenko — Maria Gogol—Yanovskaya, mother of Gogol
- Eugene Kapitonov — father of Bartholomew
- Vsevolod Tsurilo — Taras
- Lyudmila Lebedeva — old woman, recluse
- Oleg Gayanov — ataman of Danila
