= List of Russian television series =

This is a list of TV series that were made and shown in the Soviet Union and Russia. It does not include foreign-made imports.

== 1960s ==
Year	Channel	Title	Russian title	Genre
1960–2003	CT USSR, C1 Ostankino, C1R	Travelers' Club	Клуб путешественников	Travel
1960–1961		Animated Crocodile	Мультипликационный Крокодил	Adult animation
1961–present	CT USSR, C1 Ostankino, C1R, KVN TV	KVN	КВН (Клуб весёлых и находчивых)	Comedy
1962–present	CT USSR, Russia-1	Little Blue Light	Голубой огонёк	Variety
1963–2008	Russia-1	Fitil	Фитиль	Comedy
1964–present	Programme Two, C1 Ostankino, C1R, Russia-K, Russia-1	Good Night, Little Ones!	Спокойной ночи, малыши!	Children's
1965–present	all channels	Minute of Silence	Минута молчания	
1968–present	Programme One, C1 Ostankino, Russia-1, C1R, Domashny, Russia-2, Carousel	In the World of Animals	В мире животных	Zoology
1968–present	Programme One, C1 Ostankino, C1R	Time	Время	News
1969	CT USSR	The Adjutant of His Excellency	Адъютант его превосходительства	Drama
1969–2006	CT USSR	Well, Just You Wait!	Ну, погоди!	Animation

== 1970s ==
Year	Channel	Title	Russian title	Genre
1971–present	P1, C1R, Russia-1	Song of the Year	Песня года	Music
1971–2003	CT USSR, C1R	Investigation Held by ZnaToKi	Следствие ведут ЗнаТоКи	Crime
1972	Programme One	Seventeen Moments of Spring	Семнадцать мгновений весны	Espionage
1973–1983	CT USSR	Eternal Call	Вечный зов	Drama
1972	CT USSR	Big School-Break	Большая перемена	Comedy
1974–1977		Born by the Revolution	Рождённая революцией	Drama (Note: Directed by Grigory Kokhan; starring Evgeny Zharikov and Natalya Gvozdikova.)
1975	C5	For the Rest of His Life	На всю оставшуюся жизнь	Drama, war
1975	C1 Ostankino, C1R, NTV	What? Where? When?	Что? Где? Когда?	Game show
1975	CT USSR, Russia-1, TV-6, C1R, Carousel	Yeralash	Ералаш	Children's, comedy
1976	CT USSR	The Twelve Chairs	12 стульев	Musical, comedy
1978	CT USSR	D'Artagnan and Three Musketeers	д'Артаньян и три мушкетёра	Musical
1979–1986	CT USSR	The Adventures of Sherlock Holmes and Dr. Watson	Приключения Шерлока Холмса и доктора Ватсона	Crime
1979	CT USSR	The Adventures of the Elektronic	Приключения Электроника	Children's, science-fiction
1979	CT USSR	Little Tragedies	Маленькие трагедии	Drama
1979	CT USSR	The Meeting Place Cannot Be Changed	Место встречи изменить нельзя	Crime

== 1980s ==
Year	Channel	Title	Russian title	Genre
1980–1999	CT USSR, C1 Ostankino, C1R	Football Review	Футбольное обозрение	Sports
1983–2001	CT USSR, C1R	Till 16 and older...	До 16 и старше...	Youth program
1983	CT USSR	The Trust That Went Bust	Трест, который лопнул	Musical
1984	CT USSR	Dead Souls	Мёртвые души	Comedy, drama
1984–present	CT USSR, C1 Ostankino, C1R	Good Morning	Доброе Утро	Morning news
1984	CT USSR	TASS Is Authorized to Declare...	ТАСС уполномочен заявить...	Espionage
1985	CT USSR	Sofia Kovalevskaya	Софья Ковалевская	Biopic
1985	P1	Guest from the Future	Гостья из будущего	Children's, science-fiction
1985	CT USSR	Confrontation	Противостояние	Drama, war, crime
1986	P1	In Search for Captain Grant	В поисках капитана Гранта	Adventure
1987	CT USSR	Visit to Minotaur	Визит к Минотавру	Crime
1987–1993	C5	600 Seconds	600 секунд	News
1988	CT USSR	The Life of Klim Samgin	Жизнь Клима Самгина	Drama

== 1990s ==
Year	Channel	Title	Russian title	Genre
1990–present	CT USSR, C1 Ostankino, C1R	The Field of Wonders	Поле чудес	Game show
1990	NTV	Apartment Building	Дом	10-Episode telenovela
1990–1995	CT USSR, C1 Ostankino, C1R	Both to!	Оба-на!	Comedy
1991	ZDF	The Alaska Kid		Adventure
1992–1997	C1 Ostankino, C1R	Trifles of Life	Мелочи жизни	Telenovela
1993–present	C1 Ostankino, C1R	Gusto	Смак	Cooking
1993–2002	C1 Ostankino, C1R	Call of the Jungles	Зов джунглей	Children's, game show
1993		The White Horse	Конь белый	War, drama, biopic
1994–2002	NTV	Puppets	Куклы	Comedy, politics
1995–present	NTV, MTK, TV Centre, Russia-1	Hundred to One	Сто к одному	Game show
1996–2001	C1R, Russia-1	Calembour	Каламбур	Sketch comedy
1996–2007	NTV, STS	Sesame Street	Улица Сезам	Children's
1997		The Intercept	Перехват	Game show
1998–present	TNT, C1R, NTV, STS, Che	Streets of Broken Lights	Улицы разбитых фонарей	Crime
1998	Russia-K	Confession	Повинность	Documentary
1998	Russia-K	The Dialogues with Solzhenitsyn	Беседы с Солженицыным	Documentary
1999	M1	The Naked Truth	Голая правда	News, nudity

== 2000s ==
Year	Channel	Title	Russian title	Genre
2000	C1R	Empire under Attack	Империя под ударом	History, drama
2000–2003	NTV, TNT, TV-6, TVS	Turn off the Light!	Тушите свет!	Animation
2000–present	NTV, TV-6, Russia-1, House of Cinema	Secrets of Investigation	Тайны следствия	Crime
2000–2006	C1R, REN TV	Deadly Force	Убойная сила	Crime
2000–2007	NTV	Bandit Petersburg	Бандитский Петербург	Crime
2008–2014	C1R	Big Difference	Большая разница	Sketch comedy
2001–2009	C1R	Last Hero	Последний герой	Reality
2001–present	C1R	Let Them Talk	Пусть говорят	Talk show
2001–2008	C1R, C5	The Weakest Link	Слабое звено	Game show
2001–present	C1R, Russia-1, Russia-24, RTR-Planeta, Mir, RT, PTR	Direct Line with Vladimir Putin	Прямая линия с Владимиром Путиным	Annual Q&A
2002	C1R	Azazel	Азазель	Crime
2002	Russia-1	Law of the Lawless	Бригада	Crime
2002–2011	C1R	Star Factory	Фабрика звёзд	Talent show
2002–2005	STS, TNT	Windows	Окна	Talk show
2002–2003	C1R	Spetsnaz	Спецназ	War
2003–2013	Russia-1, STS	The Cleverest	Самый умный	Game show
2003	Russia-1	Lines of Fate	Линии судьбы	Drama
2003	Russia-1	The Idiot	Идиот	Drama
2003–present	NTV	Let's Eat at Home!	Едим дома!	Cooking
2003–2004	STS	Poor Nastya	Бедная Настя	Telenovela
2003–2006	Russia-1	People's Artist	Народный Артист	Talent show
2004–2007	STS	You are a Supermodel	Ты – супермодель	Reality
2004	C1R	Children of the Arbat	Дети Арбата	Drama
2004–present	TNT	House-2	Дом-2	Reality
2004	Russia-1	The Cadets	Курсанты	War
2004–2012	STS, Russia-1	Kikoriki	Смешарики	Animation
2004	C1R	Moscow Saga	Московская сага	Drama
2004–present	Russia-1, NTV	Mukhtar. The New Trace	Мухтар. Новый след	Crime
2004–2009	STS	My Fair Nanny	Моя прекрасная няня	Sitcom
2004–2005	C1R	All or Nothing	Пан или пропал	Game show
2005	C1R	Female Novel	Женский роман	Telenovela
2005	STS	Londongrad	Лондонград	Crime, comedy
2005	RTVi	They Chose Freedom	Они выбирали свободу	Documentary
2005–present	TNT	Comedy Club	Comedy Club	Comedy
2005	NTV	The Case of "Dead Souls"	Дело о «Мёртвых душах»	Fantasy
2005–2006	C1R	Adjutants of Love	Адъютанты любви	Telenovela
2005–2006	STS	Not Born Beautiful	Не Родись Красивой	Telenovela
2005	TNT	Big Brother	Большой брат	Reality
2005	C1R	Brezhnev	Брежнев	Biopic, politics
2005	C1R	The Fall of the Empire	Гибель империи	Drama
2005–2008	TNT	Inexplicable, yet a Fact	Необъяснимо, но факт	Documentary
2005	Russia-1	The Master and Margarita	Мастер и Маргарита	Fantasy
2005	C1R	Nine Lives of Nestor Makhno	Девять жизней Нестора Махно	Biopic, politics
2005	C1R	Yesenin	Есенин	Biopic
2005–2007	Russia-1	Secret of Success	Секрет Успеха	Talent show
2005–present	Russia-1	Yiddishkeit	Идишкайт	Documentary
2006	NTV	U.E.	У.Е.	Crime
2006–2016	Carousel, Russia-1, Russia-K, Mult	The Adventures of Luntik and his friends	Приключения Лунтика и его друзей	Animation
2006	Russia-1	Filipp's Bay	Бухта Филиппа	Crime
2006	Russia-1	The First Circle	В круге первом	Drama
2006–2013	TNT	Happy Together	Счастливы вместе	Sitcom
2006	TNT	Bunker, or Scientists Underground	Бункер, или учёные под землёй	Science-fiction
2006–2011	TNT	Our Russia	Наша Russia	Sketch comedy
2006–2007	Fenix-Art	Gold Field	Прииск	Drama
2006	REN TV	Deal!?	Сделка!?	Game show
2006–2007	NTV	Young Wolfhound	Молодой Волкодав	Fantasy
2006–2007	C1R	Russian Translation	Русский перевод	Crime, politics
2007	Russia-1	Liquidation	Ликвидация	Crime
2007–present	C1R, C5	Trace	След	Crime
2007–present	C1R	A Minute of Fame	Минута славы	Talent show
2007–2012	STS	Daddy's Daughters	Папины дочки	Sitcom
2007	C1R	A Second Before...	Секунда до...	Fantasy
2007–present	TNT	The Battle of Extrasensory	Битва экстрасенсов	Reality
2008–present	Russia-1, Carousel	Masha and the Bear	Маша и Медведь	Animation
2008	Russia-1	Name of Russia	Имя Россия	Greatest nationals
2008	STS	One Night of Love	Одна ночь любви	Telenovela
2008–present	C1R	Prozhektorperiskhilton	Прожекторперисхилтон	Comedy, talk show
2008–2011	TNT	Univer	Универ	Sitcom
2008–2011	C1R	Wedding Ring	Обручальное кольцо	Telenovela
2008–2015	RT, PTR, Russia-1, Russia 24, C1R	Talk with Dmitry Medvedev	Разговор с Дмитрием Медведевым	Annual Q&A
2009	C1R	The Admiral	Адмиралъ	Biopic, drama, politics
2009	C1R	Hot Ice	Жаркий лёд	Drama, sports
2009	REN TV	Top Gear Russia	Top Gear: Русская версия	Cars
2009–2012	STS	Infomania	Инфомания	News

== 2010s ==
Year	Channel	Title	Russian title	Genre
2010–2012	Muz-TV	Crocodile	Крокодил	Game show
2010–2016	TNT	Interns	Интерны	Medical, sitcom
2010–2012	Disney Channel	As the Bell Rings	Приколы на переменке	Sitcom
2011	Russia-1	Peter the Great: The Testament	Пётр Первый. Завещание	Biopic, drama, politics
2010–2015	2×2, STS, Carousel, Disney Channel, 360	Novators	Новаторы	Animation, science-fiction
2011	C1R	The Life and Adventures of Mishka Yaponchik	Жизнь и приключения Мишки Япончика	Crime
2011–present	Carousel, STS	Qumi-Qumi	Куми-Куми	Animation
2011–present	Muz-TV, You-TV	Top Model Russian-style	Топ-модель по-русски	Reality
2011–2014	TV Centre, C1R	Heavenly Court	Небесный суд	Courtroom drama, fantasy
2011–present	Carousel, Russia-1	The Barkers	Барбоскины	Animation
2011–present	TNT	Univer. New Dorm	Универ. Новая общага	Sitcom
2012	Russia-1	The White Guard	Белая гвардия	Drama
2012–present	C1R	The Voice	Голос	Talent show
2012–2016	STS	Kitchen	Кухня	Sitcom
2012	C1R	Brief Guide To A Happy Life	Краткий курс счастливой жизни	Drama
2012–present	C1R	The Dark Side of the Moon	Обратная сторона Луны	Speculative fiction, crime
2012–present	C1R	Evening Urgant	Вечерний Ургант	Talk show
2012	RT	World Tomorrow		Talk show
2013	C1R	Pyotr Leschenko. Everything That Was...	Пётр Лещенко. Всё, что было...	Biopic, drama, musical
2013	C1R	The Thaw	Оттепель	Drama
2013–present	C1R, Russia-1	One to One!	Один в один!	Talent show
2013–present	TV-3	The Invisible Man	Человек-невидимка	Game show
2013	C1R	Ex-Wife	Бывшая жена	Crime
2013–present	STS	The Junior Team	Молодёжка	Sports
2013–2016	STS, Carousel	Alisa Knows What to Do!	Алиса знает, что делать!	Animation
2013–present	TNT	SashaTanya	СашаТаня	Sitcom
2013	Russia-1	Sherlock Holmes	Шерлок Холмс	Crime
2013–present	STS	Two Fathers, Two Sons	Два отца и два сына	Sitccom
2014–present	C1R	Silver Spoon	Мажор	Crime
2014	C1R	The Three Musketeers	Три мушкетёра	Adventure
2014	C1R	House with Lilies	Дом с лилиями	Telenovela
2014–present	Russia-1	Ekaterina	Екатерина	Biopic, drama, politics
2014–present	Friday!	Revizorro	Ревизорро	Documentary
2014–2017	TNT, TV-3	Chernobyl: Zone of Exclusion	Чернобыль: Зона отчуждения	Science-fiction
2014–present	C1R, Carousel	The Voice Kids	Голос. Дети	Talent show
2015–present	Russia-1	Homeland	Родина	Thriller, espionage, politics
2015–present	Russia-1, Muz-TV	Faktor A	Фактор А	Talent show
2015	C1R	Catherine the Great	Великая	Biopic, drama, politics
2015	C1R	The Method	Метод	Crime
2015–present	Che	Utilizator	Утилизатор	Game show
2015	C1R	Vasilisa	Василиса	War
2016	C1R	Locust	Саранча	Thriller
2016–present	C1R	Klim	Клим	Crime
2016	Russia-1	Sophia	София	Drama
2016	C1R	The Dawns Here Are Quiet	А зори здесь тихие	War
2016–present	Che	The Running Thousand	Бегущий косарь	Game show
2016–present	Che	Man vs Fly	Человек против мухи	Game show
2016	Che	Name That Movie	Угадай кино	Game show
2017	NTV	The Road to Calvary	Хождение по мукам	War epic
2017	C1R	Trotsky	Троцкий	Biopic, drama, politics
2017–present	C1R	Raid	Налёт	Crime
2017–present	Russia-1	Doctor Richter	Доктор Рихтер	Medical
2017	C1R	Mata Hari	Мата Хари	Biopic, drama
2017	Russia-1	Anna Karenina: Vronsky's Story	Анна Каренина. История Вронского	Drama
2017	STS	You All Infuriate Me	Вы все меня бесите	Sitcom
2017–present	NTV	The Bridge	Мост	Crime
