= Dovhonosyky Show =

- Шоу довгоносиків
- Genre: comedy, sketch
- Screenplay by: Viktor Andriyenko; H. Konn
- Directed by: Viktor Prykhodko
- Starring: Viktor Andriyenko; Valentyn Opaliev; Tamara Yatsenko; Mykola Hudz; Vasyl Bendas; Hennadiy Korzhenko; Dmytro Tupchiy; Oleksandr Petrichenko; Petro Kuznietsov
- Composers: Ihor Stytsiuk; Mykola Brovchenko
- Country of origin: Ukraine
- Original languages: Ukrainian, Russian, surzhyk
- No. of episodes: 70 (around 50 saved)

Production
- Producer: Valentyn Opaliev
- Production locations: Kyiv, Dovzhenko Film Studios
- Camera setup: Oleh Maslov-Lysychkin
- Running time: 25-30 minutes
- Production company: PRO-TV

Original release
- Network: UT-2, 1+1, Inter, STB, TeleExpo
- Release: 18 May 1996 – 1999

Related
- Full Mamadu; Monty Python's Flying Circus; Calambur

The Dovhonosyky Show (Ukrainian: Шоу довгоносиків, literally The Long Noses Show) was a Ukrainian comedy TV show-series. It was broadcast on TV screens in Ukraine and Russia from 18 May 1996 to 1999, combining the Ukrainian language with Russian and surzhyk. In Ukraine it was rotated on the channels UT-2, 1+1, Inter, STB, in Russia it was rotated on TeleExpo channel. It was product of PRO-TV television company. The program aired weekly, getting 4 seasons with a total of 70 episodes. Filming for the new episodes stopped in 1998, when the show's creators decided that it should be closed so as not to lose quality due to a lack of new ideas. Each of the actors played several different roles in it. The content of most of the sketches was a parody of typical TV entertainment shows. All of the show's participants, including the guest stars, were adorned with unnaturally long noses, hence the show's name.

== Synopsis ==
Each episode consists of a number of rubrics and is devoted to a specific theme. At the beginning there is a meeting where the director scolds the staff or talks about his next plan to raise the popularity of the show, to save money, etc. Between the rubrics demonstrates the "normal" life of actors, cameramen or illuminators.

Rubrics:

- "The New Adventures of Sherlock Holmes and Dr. Watson" is a parody the Soviet TV series "The Adventures of Sherlock Holmes and Dr. Watson". Holmes is shown to be greedy and obsessed with Professor Moriarty, and Watson, in contrast, is prudent, though sometimes inconsiderate.
- "The Home of Wonderful People" is created on the model of historic documentary television shows that absurdly tells the biographies of famous people, such as how Nikolay Przhevalsky invented the horse. None of the characters speak, the voice-over tells about the image. Historical figures are presented as neighbors in a communal apartment.
- "My New Programme" is project of showman (and host of "Dovhonosyky Show") Ivan Shpykuliak from Bila Tserkva (in Russian-language version he is from Zhmerynka), confident in his significance and his own uniqueness.
- "News with Shenderovych" (allusion to Victor Shenderovich) are "newscastes", often in poetic form. A news presenter reads short humorous news on the topic of the program. The mole on the presenter's face is in a different place in each scene.
- "In Case of Fire Dial 01" is a parody of public service advertising. It demonstrates how overzealous firefighters pursue a fire safety offender (always the same one) and neutralize a "source of danger," such as a cigarette, kerosene lamp, boilermaker or a glass of absinthe. All sketches end with the firemen singing the phrase "In case of fire, dial zero-one" to the tune of The Beatles' Yellow Submarine song.

== Creators ==
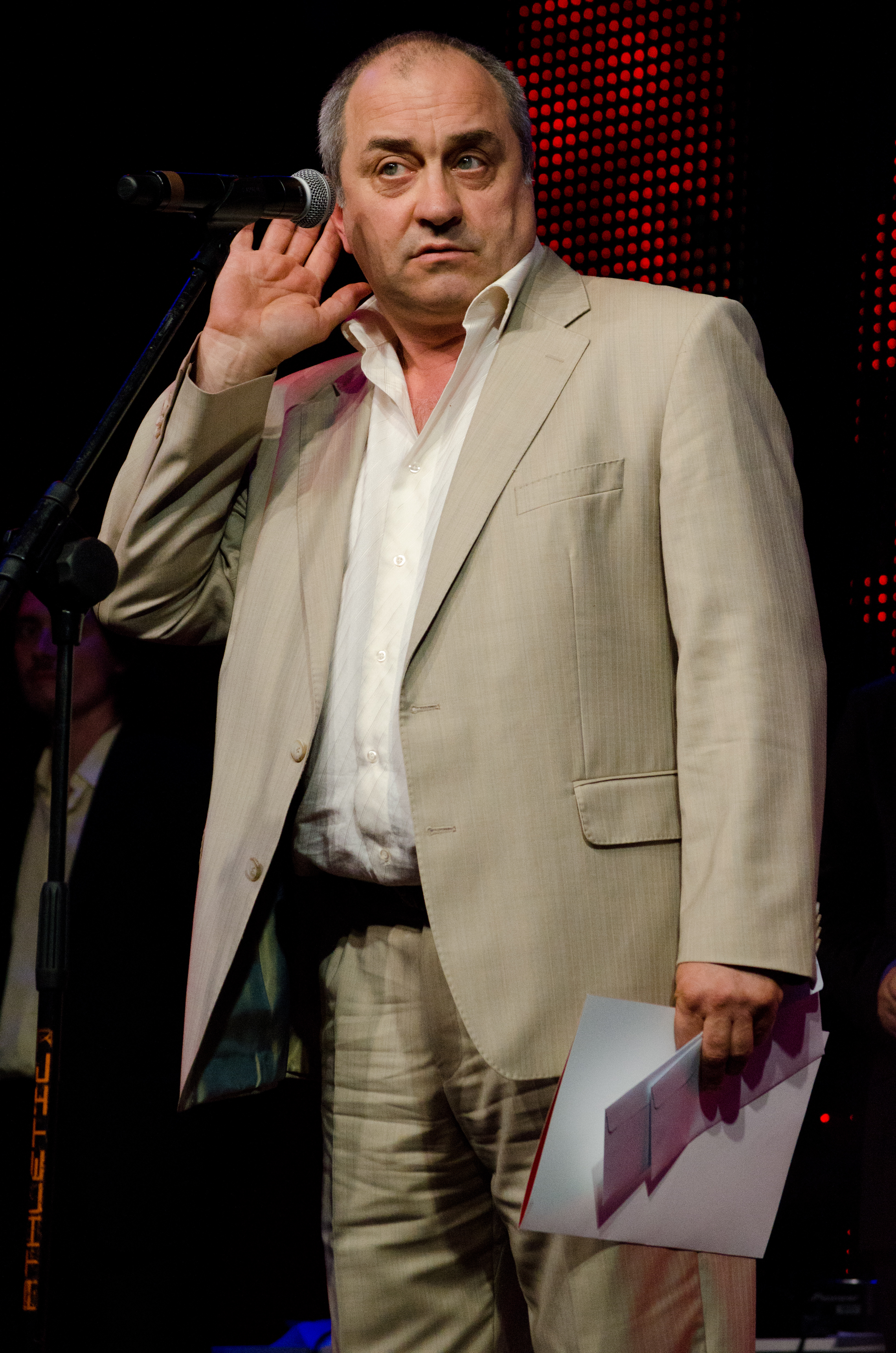
Ukrainian comedian Viktor Andriyenko, the show's main actor and scriptwriter

- Author and director - Viktor Prykhodko
- Script - Viktor Andriyenko, Heorhiy Conn
- Cameraman - Oleh Maslov-Lysychkin
- Editing director - Natalia Borovska
- Special effects and make-up - Vadym Tupchy
- General producer - Valentyn Opalev

== Cast ==
- Viktor Andriyenko: host/showman Ivan Shpykulyak, Sherlock Holmes, Shlioma Shendorovych (news anchor), Mendeleev, Count Lohudra, Marquis de Sade, firefighter, director, illuminator. Totally he played 14 characters.
- Valentyn Opalev: Dr. Watson, illuminator, firefighter, Jew (Dr. Shlyager), producer, Pr. Freud.
- Mykola Hudz: bartender.
- Petro Kuznietsov: cameraman, fire safety offender, master of special effects, Mrs. Hudson.
- Hennadiy Korzhenko (K. Henn): firefighter, Pr. Moriarty, sound engineer (Sharyk), Invisible Joe.
- Tamara Yatsenko: showwoman Anzhelika Bahniuk, The Death.
- Vadym Tupchy: inspector Lestrade, artist.
- Vasyl Bendas
- Oleksandr Petrychenko

=== Special guests ===
Taisia Povaliy, EL Kravchuk, Aleksandr Tsekalo, Lolita Milyavskaya, Serhii Syvokho, Volodymyr Danylets, Vladimir Moiseenko, Green Gray, Oleh Skrypka, Volodymyr Bystriakov, Olha Yunakova.

== Cultural significance ==
Since the early 2000s the phraseme of the "dovhonosyky show" has been known to refer to meaningless and/or comic events in Ukrainian politics.

In 2013, the Russian website oKino included the Dovhonosyky Show as one of the turning points of Ukrainian television. "Dovhonosyky" was called the Ukrainian "Monty Python", however, they noted that the show stood out among the comedy shows of its time and therefore did not have much success, although it did gain cult status

Actor Viktor Andriyenko said about the "Dovhonosyky Show" that its time has passed and it is not impractical to revive or imitate of the project in its former form. He added that "dovhonosyky" were relevant at the time, and modern viewer will not accept them, but it is possible to show old episodes retrospectively.
