= Channel One Worldwide (Russia) =

International service of Channel One Russia

Channel One Russia Worldwide (Russian: Первый канал. Всемирная сеть, romanized: Perviy kanal. Vsemirnaya set) is a subsidiary of Channel One Russia, responsible for the distribution of its television signal outside of Russia.

== History ==
On 27 November 1995, the company ORTV-Region was established with the task of developing international broadcasting. In its early years, the company was engaged in broadcasting the renewed Channel One in the countries of the former USSR, such as Kazakhstan, Kyrgyzstan, the Baltic states, Ukraine, Belarus, and Moldova.

On 27 September 1999, the company began satellite broadcasting by launching the channel ORT-International, which transmitted Channel One programmes for viewers in Europe. Channel One Worldwide broadcasts all Channel One productions licensed for international distribution. Since June 2019, an HD version of the channel has been available. The theoretical audience of Channel One Worldwide exceeds 250 million viewers.

In 2005, Channel One Worldwide launched a digital broadcasting project for cable and satellite channels called "Digital Television Family" (Russian: Цифровое Телесемейство, romanized: Tsifrovoye Telesemeystvo). By 2020, the package included 10 thematic channels: Dom Kino, Vremya, Muzyka Pervogo, Telekafe, Dom Kino Premium, Pobeda, O!, Poyekhali!, Bobyor, and Katyusha. In 2022, the rights to broadcast the Digital Television Family channels were acquired by Tricolor. From 25 February 2025, all channels switched to HD broadcasting.

== Versions ==
- On 27 September 1999, the first international version of ORT was launched for broadcasting outside the Russian Federation, particularly to Europe and the Middle East (MSK−2/−3). It was relaunched on 31 March 2013 (MSK+0)
- In 2000, ORT-International began distribution in Ukraine, and in 2002 Ukrainian advertising appeared on air. On 1 February 2007, a separate Ukrainian version of the channel was launched (MSK−1/−2), later relaunched on 31 March 2013 (MSK+0). Broadcasting ceased on 26 March 2014 following a ban on popular Russian TV channels in Ukraine. On 20 February 2015, the Ukrainian version was discontinued on the NTV-Plus Ukraine platform and replaced by the channel Kinomayak
- In 2004, broadcasting for the United States and Canada was launched (MSK−8)
- On 27 March 2006, broadcasting began in Australia and New Zealand (MSK+7)
- On 3 May 2006, broadcasting started for the Caucasus and Central Asia (MSK+3)
- On 13 December 2007, a version for the Asia-Pacific region was launched (MSK+5)

== Transformation into Channel One Digital ==
In mid-August 2014, it was announced that Channel One Worldwide would be reorganized as Channel One Digital JSC, which would retain all the functions of Channel One Worldwide, while also consolidating "a number of projects aimed at reaching audience groups with a low level of traditional viewing and at strengthening Channel One’s presence on alternative platforms and non-linear broadcasting services." These projects included the creation and adaptation of content for internet audiences, its distribution in Russia and abroad, mobile applications, second-screen apps, online content distribution, and online channels, in partnership with major internet companies.

Alexey Yefimov became CEO of Channel One Digital. He had previously served as CEO of Channel One Worldwide from 2004 to 2008, later headed MTV Russia, and since 2011 had been an adviser to Konstantin Ernst at Channel One. Since summer 2013, Yefimov had been developing the strategy for the Channel One Digital project. Former Channel One Worldwide CEO Nikolay Dubovoy (2008–2014) became CEO of the television channel Karusel.

== Structure ==
- Television channel Channel One Worldwide (satellite orbits: −8 USA, +0 Europe, +3 CIS, +5 Asia, and +7 Australia)
- Television channel Karusel (50%, jointly with VGTRK)
- Television channel Katyusha

== Satellite broadcasting ==
Broadcasts are carried out from satellites in FTA format:

- Channel One Europe — Express 103, 96.5°E, 3925 MHz, R polarization, symbol rate 4883 Msymb/s, FEC 1/2, DVB-S/MPEG-2
- Channel One Europe — Express AM8, 14°W, 11623 MHz, V polarization, symbol rate 6888 Msymb/s, FEC 3/4, DVB-S2/MPEG-2
- Channel One Europe — Express AM8, 14°W, 11623 MHz, V polarization, symbol rate 6888 Msymb/s, FEC 3/4, DVB-S2/MPEG-4
- Channel One USA — Express AM44, 11°W, 3662 MHz, R polarization, symbol rate 10808 Msymb/s, FEC 1/2, DVB-S/MPEG-2

== See also ==
- First Baltic channel
