= TeleExpo =

Television channel in Moscow, Russia

Teleexpo Телеэкспо
- Country: Russia

History
- Launched: March 1, 1995
- Closed: October 1, 2001

Teleexpo (Russian: Телеэкспо) was one of the first commercial television channels in Russia. It was founded by the government of Moscow and by the commercial house Mosexpo. It began broadcasting on March 1, 1995 on the UHF band. It was only broadcast in the territory of Moscow and the Moscow Region.

== History ==
=== 1994—1998. The opening ===
In the fall of 1994, the mayor of Moscow, Yury Luzhkov, sent a letter to the head of the FSTR, Alexander Yakovlev, in which he complained about the limited broadcasting time of the Moscow television program (MTK). Luzhkov, in order to "deeper coverage of the cultural potential of Moscow and the Moscow region" asked Yakovlev to issue the Moscow company "Teleexpo" a license for part of the airtime on the frequency occupied by the State TV and Radio Company "Petersburg - Channel Five" (33 TVK in Moscow and the Moscow region), namely 12 hours on weekdays and 9.5 hours on weekends. At that time, in the morning hours, the TV company Fresh Wind went on the air on Channel Five. A conflict situation arose, but a solution was found in it: in the morning, Fresh Wind programs were broadcast to Moscow and the Moscow Region with the Teleexpo logo, while the Teleexpo TV company itself was actively broadcasting in the first months only at night (in the morning hours, only advertising and infomercial).

The fact that the programs of the TV company "Fresh Wind" were aired without the "Petersburg" logo did not go unnoticed, because of which the "Fresh Wind" was forced to leave the air, and the State TV and Radio Company "Petersburg - Channel Five", by the court's decision, lost its morning air. Thus, from 1 January 1996 to 31 October 1997 "Teleexpo" began to go on air in the morning, while in the regions (including St. Petersburg itself) the morning broadcast of "Channel Five" was absent. In St. Petersburg itself, in May–June 1996 in the morning (until 12:30) and at night (from 1:00) on the frequency of the State Television and Radio Broadcasting Company "Petersburg - Channel Five" Muz-TV programs were broadcast; before and after that, the TV channel was not broadcast during the broadcasting periods of Teleexpo and there. If in the timeslot 23:30-1:00 on Channel Five there was a feature film, at 0:29 its broadcast was cut off, after which Teleexpo began broadcasting. If a public holiday or weekend falls on a weekday before and after it (1 January and 2, 8 March, 1 May or 9, 12 June, 7 November and 12 December), the channel still adhered to the standard broadcasting schedule and ended the show in the morning day block at 12:30. Also, by analogy, if Saturday or Sunday on the occasion of the postponement of holidays were working days, then the TV channel adhered to the volume of broadcasting weekends and ended the show of the morning block at 10:00. Initially, the morning broadcasting block began daily at 8:00, then on weekdays its beginning shifted gradually: first to 7:30, then to 7:00, and later to 6:30.

On 8 June 1998, the broadcast began to start at 7:00 daily. In some cases, the broadcast could end at 3:30, and on New Year's Eve the TV channel did not turn off for a break (while on 31 December 1997 and 1999 in the program provided technical breaks from 4:00 and 6:30, respectively). Sometimes, on the days of maintenance work on 33 TVKs in Moscow and the Moscow Region, which took place on one of the Mondays of the month, the morning air of the TV channel was also absent, and in such cases, the main broadcaster of the frequency began broadcasting at the frequency: "Channel Five" - from 14:00, later from 14:30, TV channel "Culture" - from 12:30.

From 1998 to 2001, on some penultimate Mondays of the month, the same preventive work was simultaneously extended to MTV (Russian TV channel) in Moscow and the Moscow region, where they took place until 17:00. In the event of maintenance work on 33 TVKs in Moscow and the Moscow Region from 10:00 to 18:00, the morning Teleexpo block came out cut-down from 7:00 to 10:00.

At the end of the TV channel broadcasting, the UEIT appeared on the air, which was used in the 1990s and 2000s for the preventive maintenance of the ORT, NTV (until 1997) and TV-6 (then TVS) TV channels in 1996-1997 before the start of the broadcast of the main owner of the frequency - Channel Five (in 10–20 minutes) its tuning table with the logo appeared.

Since 1998, in cases where maintenance work was underway on the Kultura TV channel by 12:30, the GPC table of this TV channel was used, in other cases, after the end of the morning-afternoon block of Teleexpo programs, the broadcast was switched to the opening screen saver of the Kultura TV channel ( at 12:30 on weekdays and at 10:00 on weekends).

The "Teleexpo" grid was composed mainly of numerous shops on the couch, musical programs ("Live with Max", "Musical cocktail", "KlipSa", "Manhattan Moose Express", "Musical rumors"), author's ("Anthropology" by Dmitry Dibrov) or entertaining nature ("Gentleman Show", "Weevils Show", "Rendezvous with a Star"), as well as music videos. Later, the channel began to show various television series, mainly Mexican production, feature films and television concerts. Once on the TV channel a basketball sports broadcast was shown.

In May 1995, the channel began to appear in some print media (for example, the newspaper Pravda (until 1998, within the broadcasting network of the Kultura TV channel), Antenna-Telesem, Argumenty i Fakty, Segodnya (until 1997), Nezavisimaya Gazeta, Novye Izvestia (until 1998), All TV Channels, Komsomolskaya Pravda ( until 1997), Izvestia (until 1997), Moskovskij Komsomolets, Vechernyaya Moskva, Russian Telegraph and the magazines 7 days ”, “ TV Park”, “MK-Bulvar”, “TV-Parade”, as well as the press in the cities of Moscow area).

=== 1998—2001. BIZ-TV/MTV Russia ===
Since 1 April 1998, a number of programs have been aired with a parallel logo BIZ-TV, previously broadcast on 2x2, and in the summer of the same year the broadcast almost entirely consisted of those programs, which then became an integral part of the MTV (Russian TV channel) in its first three to four years of broadcasting.

On 26 September 1998, the broadcast of their own programs was finally stopped. From 0:30 on that day, under license from Teleexpo with the channel's logo in the lower right corner, the MTV Russia TV channel was broadcasting in the morning and at night. However, according to the Decree of the President of the Russian Federation on the creation of the Kultura TV channel, the possibility of any other “neighbors” TV channels appearing on 33 TVKs in Moscow and the Moscow Region was not indicated. The retransmission of MTV Russia, according to the chairman of the board of directors of the TV channel Boris Zosimov, was carried out at Teleexpo solely in order to attract viewers' attention to this TV channel and the MTV brand in particular.

From 27 August to 5 September 2000, due to a fire at the Ostankino TV tower, MTV Russia did not broadcast on the Teleexpo frequency. The channel's broadcasting was resumed on the night of 5–6 September 2000. Also, from 5 to 24 September 2000, MTV Russia broadcast at Teleexpo around the clock from 0:30 to 12:30 on weekdays and from 0:30 to 10:00 on weekends without a four- and five-hour break from 2:00 until 7:00 and from 3:00 to 7:00, which was practiced earlier. This was done due to the fact that MTV Russia broadcast on its own frequency (38 TVK in Moscow, daytime and evening programs) was restored a little later, and at the time of the resumption of Teleexpo broadcasting it was completely absent.

Since September 25, 2000, the round-the-clock broadcasting of the TV channel was canceled, and at 2:00 (on Mondays) and at 3:00 (on the rest of the week) it again began to switch to the tuning table or the screensaver of the clock of the Kultura TV channel, which until 2003 it was identical to the clock of the RTR TV channel (in 2002-2003 - the Russia TV channel). At the same time, until 8 October 2000, the broadcast of the morning block began at 6:00 Moscow time.

=== 2001—2003. Euronews and license expiration ===
In August 2001, the first information appeared in the press that the MTV-Teleexpo air hours would be transferred either to the Russia-K channel or to the Euronews news channel. It was also noted that the coexistence of Kultury and Euronews on the same TV channel looks more natural than Kultury and MTV. It was planned that the programs of the MTV channel will be shown at Teleexpo until the license expires.

From 2 October 2001 (without prior mention in TV programs until October 14) instead of MTV Russia under the Teleexpo license, the programs of the European news channel Euronews began to be broadcast in Russian. Initially, Euronews aired under the Teleexpo license from 0:30 to 3:00 and from 6:30 to 12:30 on weekdays and until 10:00 on weekends and holidays, covering part of the morning programs of the Kultura TV channel.

From 15 October 2001 to July 2003, in a number of print media (“7 days”, “TV PARK”, “Arguments and Facts”), the column previously assigned to “Teleexpo”, continued to publish: in it, due to the lack of a rigid broadcasting grid, Euronews always wrote the same text: “News releases of the Euronews agency in Russian” or more often - “Program of the international information channel“ Euronews ”in Russian ", Registered in the publication" 7 Days "from 31 December 2001, and in" TV Park "- from 29 October of the same year; From 15 to 28 October 2001, the column with the Euronews program guide was missing in the magazine.

Since 1 April 2002, in connection with the appearance on the Kultura TV channel of Andrey Maksimov's Night Flight program, the lower boundary of the Euronews block moved from 0:30 to 1:00, and from 30 September 2002, the block was cut to 10:00.

On 30 November 2002, the Euronews channel began broadcasting under the license of the Kultura TV channel within its broadcasting network throughout the channel's entire distribution network.

Teleexpo's license expired on 8 June 2003, as evidenced by the TV channel's registration card as a media, the disappearance of a separate column from a number of print media allocated for Euronews and the beginning of publication of its morning block from July 2003 as a separate program in the broadcasting network TV channel "Culture" (there were only indirect references to the night block).

== Programs ==
Originally, it focused on music and entertainment. In the first year of broadcasting, it broadcast the programs Alive and A-Erotic, and soon added more television series, predominantly those produced in Mexico. In May 1996 the channel began to show art films and television concerts. At the same time, TeleExpo began to be listed in all television guides. By 1998 it increasingly began to focus on music, and by that summer was broadcasting musical programming almost exclusively. On September 26, 1998, Teleexpo began to transmit MTV Russia in the morning and at night.
