= List of Soviet television projects =

- Vremya Time (1968)
- Kinopanorama Cinema panorama (1962)
- Utrenyaya pochta Morning mail (1974)
- Spokoynoy nochi, malyshi! Good night, kids! (1964)
- Chto? Gde? Kogda? What? Where? When? (1975)
- Yeralash (1974)
- Minuta molchaniya Minute of silence (1965)
- Goluboi ogonyok Little blue light
- Prozhektor perestroiki Spotlight of perestroika (1987)
- Sluzhu Sovetskomu Soyuzu I serve the Soviet Union (1983)
- Futbolnoye obozreniye Football overview (1980)
- Mezhdunarodnaya panorama International panorama (1969)
- Do i posle polunochi Before and after the midnight (1987)
- Do 16 i starshe Before 16 and older (1983)
- V mire zhyvotnykh In the world of animals (1968)
- Vokrug smekha Around the laughter (1978)
- Budilnik Alarm (1965)
- Oba-na! Ugol-shou (1990)
- Fitil Fuse (1962)
- Pesnya goda Song of the year (1971)
- Ochevidnoye - neveroyatnoye Obvious - unbelievable (1973)
- Klub puteshestvennikov Wanderer's Club (1960)
- Zdorovie Health (1960)
- VID (1990)
  - Vzglyad Glance (1987)
  - Pole Chudes Field of Wonders (1990)
  - Muzoboz Music overview
  - Vedi
  - Eldorado
  - Shou birzha
  - Sinematograf
  - Matador
  - Programma 500
  - Sketch
  - Delo
  - Gospozha Udacha

== See also ==
- Soviet Central Television
