= Nosedive =

Nosedive or nose dive may refer to:

- Nosedive (aeronautics), a nose-forward dive of an aircraft
- "Nosedive" (Black Mirror), an episode of Black Mirror
- "Nosedive", a song by Dynamic Duo featuring Chen
- "Nosedive", a song by Post Malone from F-1 Trillion
- Nosedive, a character in Mighty Ducks
- "The Nose Dive", a sketch in the Ukrainian TV series Calambur
