= MTV (Russia) =

Russian music television network

MTV Russia MTV Россия
- Country: Russia
- Broadcast area: Armenia; Azerbaijan; Belarus; Georgia; Kazakhstan; Kyrgyzstan; Mongolia; Tajikistan; Uzbekistan
- Headquarters: Moscow, Russia

Programming
- Picture format: 1080i HDTV (downscaled to 16:9 576i for the SDTV feed)

Ownership
- Owner: Paramount Global
- Sister channels: Nickelodeon Russia; Paramount Comedy Russia

History
- Launched: 25 September 1998, 0:30 (original); 1 October 2013 (relaunch)
- Closed: 1 June 2013 (original); 28 April 2022 (in Russia); 14 December 2022 (in Belarus); 15 December 2022 (in Commonwealth of Independent States)
- Replaced by: Friday! (original); MTV Global; MTV Live (Relaunch, CIS Except Russia and Belarus)

Links
- Website: mtv.ru

MTV Russia (Russian: MTV Россия) was a Russian music and entertainment TV channel, which carried out its broadcasting from 25 September 1998 to 31 May 2013. On 1 October 2013, MTV Russia was relaunched as a pay TV channel.

In March 2022, Paramount Global announced that it intends to pause operations in Russia. The company did not comment on their plans of returning in the future.

== History ==
=== Pre-launch (1988–1998) ===
In October 1988, the management of MTV Networks Europe (now Paramount Networks EMEAA) visited the USSR for preliminary negotiations on the launch of MTV Europe, at the same time an application for registration of the TV channel was submitted.

In 1989, MTV Europe covered the Moscow Music Festival live from Lenin Stadium. Soviet artists officially debuted on MTV in the summer of 1989. The Moscow group "Cruise" released the "Hit for MTV" manifesto song at the same time.

On 8 March 1991, MTV Europe began broadcasting in the USSR, and thus became the first Western 24/7 TV channel that could be received in the country. Also, in 1993–1998, music videos with the MTV logo were consistently aired on some Russian channels, including 2x2, TV-6, Muz-TV.

The appearance of the Russian version of MTV became known on 6 April 1998, when the CEO of MTV Networks Tom Freston and the president of Biz Enterprises Boris Zosimov signed a five-year license agreement for broadcasting.

=== Launch and first years (1998–2002) ===
25 September 1998, MTV Russia began broadcasting in Moscow and St. Petersburg. The broadcast had been opened with the concert of The Prodigy in Moscow. The first Russian music video was Vladivostok 2000 by Mumiy Troll, the first foreign music video was Puff Daddy and Jimmy Page's Come With Me. In the initial period of the channel's operation, 35% of broadcast music videos were Russian, the remaining 65% were foreign, unlike its competitor in the face of the Muz-TV channel, whose broadcast was dominated by songs by Russian artists. In comparison with its competitor, MTV also attracted the attention of viewers by showing music videos of Russian and foreign bands and performers that are quite radical by the standards of domestic television, high-quality clips of foreign music stars, charts from around the world, programs about extreme sports, style and fashion, as well as documentaries about the lives of idols from the world of popular and rock music. Part of the first programs of MTV Russia originally appeared on Zosimov's BIZ-TV channel, almost the entire original cast of VJ's also moved from there.

Almost all Russian pop-music artists were blacklisted on MTV Russia back then, meaning their music videos weren't neither watched nor selected at channel's artistic councils. Non-musical programs of foreign versions of MTV in the first 3–4 years of broadcasting of the Russian channel almost did not get on the air. As the target audience of his channel, Zosimov considered viewers aged 12 to 25–30 years, among whom in those years channel was in the greatest demand.

Unlike Western countries, where MTV was primarily a cable or satellite TV channel, MTV Russia's broadcast in the period from 1998 to 2013 was carried out in the broadcast range on the principle of a network TV channel with a mixed signal distribution scheme: through its own frequencies or by retransmitting the air through network partners. In particular, from 26 September 1998, to 2 October 2001, MTV could be seen in the morning and at night in Moscow on Channel 33 Teleexpo (which occupied the morning and night hours of the TV channel Kultura), daytime and evening broadcasts been taking place only on Channel 38. In other regions of the country, the channel began broadcasting at 7:00 AM. From 2 October 2001, Euronews channel began to air on Channel 33 in the morning and at night, and MTV Russia completely switched to the UHF (Channel 38 in Moscow, where from 1998 to 2001 the channel broadcast only on weekdays from 12:30 PM to 12:29 AM, and on weekends from 10:00 AM to 12:29 AM).

During 1998–2001, the broadcasting of MTV was expanded to most of the regions of Russia, as well as to some cities in Kazakhstan (Astana, Karaganda, Almaty, Temirtau, etc.). Initially, the channel's broadcasting was end-to-end for all time zones of broadcasting. In 2002, MTV Russia began broadcasting in the new time zone MSK+4 (UTC+7; for Siberia and the Far East), which allowed viewers from these regions to watch programs at a convenient time, and not with a time shift, as it was before. In 2010, versions of MSK+2 (UTC+5; for the Urals) and MSK+7 (UTC+10; for the Far East) were added. The coast-to-coast broadcasting stopped simultaneously with the departure of the TV channel from broadcasting.

From 5 to 24 September 2000, in connection with the fire at the Ostankino TV Tower, MTV Russia was broadcast on Teleexpo around the clock from 0:30 to 12:30 on weekdays and from 0:30 to 10:00 on weekends, without a four- and five-hour break from 2:00 to 7:00 and from 3:00 to 7:00, which was practiced earlier. This was done due to the fact that the broadcast of "MTV Russia" on its frequency (38 TVC in Moscow, daytime and evening broadcasts) was restored somewhat later, and at the time of the resumption of broadcasting of "Teleexpo" it was completely absent. Since 25 September 2000, the round-the-clock broadcasting was canceled, and it began broadcasting according to the same schedule (from 7:00 to 2:00 on Mondays and from 7:00 to 3:00 on the rest of the week). Since 16 April 2002, MTV Russia has switched to 24-hour broadcasting on a permanent basis. Despite this, until the end of the 2000s, on the night from Monday to Tuesday, there was a weekly technical break from 1:45 to 6:00 in the round-the-clock operation of the TV channel.

=== Sale to Viacom (2002–2008) ===
In 2002, Boris Zosimov sold his stake to the owner of the MTV brand to Viacom, after which he left the channel. At the same time, Viacom began to change the channel format on the model of the original MTV channel. Due to the upcoming changes and the need to free up human and material resources for the implementation of new projects, the channel's management decided to remove a number of rating programs from the air, such as "12 angry viewers", "Good Morning", "Quiet Hour", "Gimlet Rule", "PaparazZi", "Shit Parade" and "Caprice". After the channel left: Asya Kalyasina, Vasily Strelnikov, Elena Zosimova, Lika Dlugach, Irma Ignatova, Mikhail Rolnik, Anton Komolov, Olga Shelest, Yana Churikova, Andrey Grigoriev-Apollonov — the hosts of these programs.

The editorial policy began to change gradually. In accordance with the views on the development of MTV Russia by its new president Linda Jensen, since 2002, the channel has expanded the time for foreign-produced programs with translation into Russian, as well as for animated series. Among the similar non—musical programs and series that appeared in those years were "Boiling Point", "In flight", "True Life", "Transformation", "Cribs", "I Bet You Will", "Pimp My Ride", "Viva la Bam", "South Park", "Stripperella". Instead of closed rating music programs, the daytime program "Total Show" was created. The channel's music broadcasts gradually increased the number of clips of Russian pop artists, including those who, for their part, lobbied major record labels or advertisers.

After Ilya Bachurin came to MTV Russia, the music blocks also often began to rotate and video clips of graduates of the "Factory of Stars" project created under his supervision, over time, the reality show itself began to air (Channel One was considered a friendly partner of MTV Russia in those years, from where Bachurin came). Against the background of the departure of the original VJ's, the quality of programs and the popularity of the channel began to gradually decline. In addition, the free airtime was gradually given to interactive programs that were based on voting conducted by sending SMS messages to a four-digit phone number. At various times, "SMS-chart", "Kinochart", "Mobile Robots", etc. were broadcast on MTV Russia. From 2004 to 2009, SMS services for ordering songs to mobile phones or performing various entertainment services, as well as chats that were displayed at the bottom of the screen during the clips and broadcasts, were constantly working on the channel. Similar services in those years during the broadcast worked on other specialized decimeter channels (DTV-Viasat, Muz-TV, TV-3 and 7TV).

Since 9 January 2004, the broadcasting of "MTV Russia" began to go with stereo sound. This was evidenced by a gray rectangular bar with the text "Stereo" under the logo, which was displayed on the Moscow broadcast of the TV channel from January 2004 to December 2005. At the same time, the TV channel carried out technical re-equipment of all TV studios involved in filming their own projects.

In the mid-2000s, the strengthening of the positions of such entertainment TV channels as STS and TNT forced MTV Russia to change the broadcasting schedule of the channel since 2005 in the direction of reducing the number of music videos and programs related to music being shown and increasing the number of entertainment programs — both of its own production and programs with voiceover translation into Russian, borrowed from MTV. Due to the difficult relationship with the new management (according to Tutta Larsen, who did not understand how talented the team was assembled on the channel by Zosimov), and due to the unfavorable environment for creative activity on the channel, the few remaining VJ's and voice-over workers from the old composition of MTV Russia continued to leave their places, In particular, in 2003–2006, general producer Dmitry Velikanov and VJ Tatiana Gevorkyan, Ivan Urgant, Grigory Kulagin left the channel.

Despite the outflow of personnel, around the same time, the TV channel began to master other, new for itself television genres. From autumn 2004 to autumn 2008, MTV Russia held its own music awards ceremony — the MTV Russia Music Awards (RMA). And from 2006 to 2009, the MTV Russia Film Awards ceremony was held. In 2006, the channel launched a high-budget television series of its own production "Club". The success of the series among viewers allowed the TV channel to shoot the second series — "Hello, I'm your dad".

From 2005 to 2006, the channel began showing more active foreign youth television series: "Less than Perfect", "Scrubs", "Californication", "Skins", "Turkish for Beginners" and others. At one time in the mid-2000s, anime was also broadcast on MTV Russia (as well as on Muz-TV). According to the memoirs of Ilya Bachurin, the then program director of the channel, most of the innovations on MTV Russia did not meet the expectations of viewers and management: as a result, the channel's youth audience has sharply decreased. Since 2006, as well as on other decimeter channels of those years, interactive TV games in the Call-TV format were released on MTV Russia (in which to win it was necessary to call by phone and guess the encrypted word, personality or solve a mathematical equation). At different times there were TV shows "Catch your luck", in the daytime and at night.

In June 2007, 100% of the shares of the TV channels "MTV Russia" and "VH1 Russia" were bought by the company "Prof-Media". The new owner immediately began the reorganization of the TV channel in order to convert it from music to entertainment. As part of this procedure, in January 2008, the general director Leonid Yurgelas was dismissed from the TV channel — the management of Prof-Media was dissatisfied with the results of his work on MTV Russia. If in the period 2004–2005, the share of MTV never fell below the 1-1.4% mark, then in 2006–2007, the share of the channel fell: in different months it ranged from 0.8% to 1.1%.

=== Rebranding (2008–2013) ===
In January 2008, Prof-Media Holding appointed acting CEO of MTV Russia Konstantin Likhodedov, who was previously engaged in the management of the TV-3 movie channel, which was transferred to the same holding company at about the same time. In April, Alexey Efimov, who previously worked in the broadcast promotion department on the international version of Channel One, as well as the program director of NTV, was appointed the new permanent general director of the channel. Alexey Sinitsyn, former deputy general director of 2x2, became the executive director.

In the summer of the same year, a rebranding was launched, which involved reducing the production of its own programs and staff. As a result, famous VJ's Marika and Timur Solovyov, as well as the penultimate presenter from the original line-up of VJs, left MTV Russia — Tutta Larsen (she left the TV channel on her own). Only Alexander Anatolyevich remained from the old team at MTV Russia; at the same time, his son Yaroslav Alexandrovich stopped working in the frame. The programming content has also changed significantly: by the end of the year, Russian third-party programs and programs adapted to Russian-speaking viewers of foreign branches of MTV began to dominate the air of MTV Russia. At the same time, the postscript "MUSIC TELEVISION" disappears from the logo of the TV channel, due to the fact that the management of MTV Russia considered that it had lost its relevance due to changes in the grid and the concept of broadcasting. The changes in the channel's broadcast schedule in those years were explained by the fact that showing exclusively video clips on the air with the development of the Internet and the distribution of free music there no longer attracts the viewer and does not give such high ratings as before, and young people are kept at the screens only by "bright and provocative reality shows and high-quality Western animation in the spirit of 'South Park'".

In October 2008, the channel began a new season, which was already being worked on by the team of Alexey Efimov and other people previously involved in Channel One. In particular, within the framework of this concept, "Stereo-morning" was released early every morning on MTV Russia, according to the statement of the TV channel — "the first morning music show in stereo format". During the clips within the framework of this program, the stereo sound icon with two crossed squares was already lit, by analogy with the one that was used from 2003 to 2008 on Channel One. The new managers continued the management policy towards the conversion of "MTV Russia" into an entertainment one. Already at the initial stage of the management, all interactive TV games in the Call-TV format were removed from the air (whose broadcasting had been going on since 2006), after a year and a half, the practice of showing clips for money was discontinued. Also, around the same years, all previously working SMS services for ordering songs to mobile phones were removed from the air.

On 9 September 2009 at 09:09:09 (Moscow time), as part of the global rebranding, the TV channel changed its broadcast design, and a new slogan "MTV is more than music" also appeared. New programs of a predominantly entertaining nature have appeared on the air. From that time until the end of broadcasting, MTV Russia, like other MTV channels abroad, finally became an entertainment TV channel. Alexey Efimov defined the then concept of "MTV Russia" as "a channel about a certain way of life and a view of the world around us that helps a young person navigate it and show their individuality" or "a channel for those who want to live in Moscow but feel like a European": "MTV is not only music. This is, if you like, a way of life. We are interested in everything radical, modern, advanced, funny, ironic, surprising, inspiring, dynamic — close to young people in all parts of the planet".

In November 2009, Roman Sarkisov became the new general director of the TV channel, who was also the general director of the 2x2 channel, which was then part of the same holding with MTV Russia. He was tasked with increasing the number of Russian-made entertainment projects in the broadcast network, which was subsequently done. The most famous of the projects launched under his leadership was the reality show "Vacation in Mexico", which was popular among viewers, including among the target audience of the show "Dom-2" (TNT). Despite all these innovations, the already low ratings of the TV channel continued to decline. According to the results of 2012 (the penultimate year of broadcasting), MTV Russia had an average daily share of 0.7%. On 18 January 2010, the transformation of Energia-TV from a closed joint-stock company into a limited liability company was completed

On the morning of 10 April 2010, the final global rebranding takes place on the channel, within which MTV Russia receives a new logo identical to the rest of the MTV channels around the world (like the old one, only slightly trimmed from the bottom).

On 1 June 2010, the TV channel "VH1 Russia" ended its broadcast on the night of 31 May to 1 June 2010 at exactly midnight Moscow time with the clip "Resistance" by the band "Muse". This information was officially confirmed by the press service of MTV Russia. Since that moment, Russian pay-TV operators have started broadcasting VH1 Europe again.

In the autumn — winter of 2010, Energia-TV LLC stopped distributing the TV channel in Kazakhstan, Moldova, and Belarus, and in April 2012 — in Kyrgyzstan.

On 25 September 2011, MTV Russia celebrated its 13th anniversary on the air, in honor of which the TV series "Club" was re-broadcast.

In June 2012, Roman Sarkisov left the post of general director of the TV channel. Nikolai Kartozia was appointed the new head of MTV Russia. After the change of management, the format also began to change — in the fall, the duration of the music block was shortened, sitcoms, Soviet cinema and animation began to appear in the broadcast network, as well as various TV shows that are not directly related to the MTV brand. And in mid-December, it was officially announced that from 31 May 2013, MTV Russia will stop broadcasting due to the launch of a new entertainment TV channel called Friday! on its frequency. In preparation for its launch on 11 February 2013, Energia-TV LLC was renamed into FRIDAY TV Company LLC.

From February to March 2013, repeats of rating programs of previous years — "Good Morning", "12 angry viewers", "Full Contact", "Shit Parade" (2007 version) and "Pimp My Ride" were broadcast on the night air from 1:00 to 5:00 in a specially dedicated block "Legends of MTV". Also, one episode of the programs "Weekend Caprice" and "VIP Caprice" were broadcast on the air.

31 May 2013, MTV Russia stopped broadcasting. The last broadcast of the MTV broadcast was the reality show "Vacation in Mexico-2". Despite this, a week before the termination of broadcasting, in many print media there was a formed MTV broadcast grid for 31 May 2013, where before the officially announced broadcast restart program, the channel had to show at least four more programs — "News Block", the detective series "Pretty Little Liars", the comedy series "Scrubs" and a block of music videos under the heading "Music".

=== Relaunch as a pay-TV channel (2013–2022) ===
In September 2013, VIMN launched Pick Me MTV: which is a competition to find the face and voice of MTV Russia. To promote the competition a website was launched at mtvpickme.ru.

On 1 October 2013, Viacom International Media Networks (VIMN), the copyright holder of the MTV brand, launched the "updated" satellite TV channel "MTV Russia" on a paid basis. The broadcasting center is now located in London, but the editorial office is in Moscow. Broadcasting of the updated TV channel was launched simultaneously in the 16:9 and HDTV formats (until 31 May 2013, the broadcast of the TV channel was carried out in the 4:3 SDTV format). A complete re-sounding of foreign content was also made for showing in Russian, since the new owner began to place high demands on the quality of translation and sound. At the same time, the rights to TV programs and other video content shown and released on MTV Russia from 1998 to 2013 do not belong to the new TV channel, as its authors have repeatedly stated in their news reports. New presenters are working on the air of the updated MTV Russia (the concept of "VJ" is no longer used on the channel) Tata Mehrabyan, Artem Kolesnikov and Sasha Shevtsov.

In addition to music blocks and concerts, premieres of new foreign shows are broadcast on the channel, as well as classics of the MTV brand: "Pimp My Ride", "Daria", "Beavis and Butthead", "Punk'd". The premieres of new original shows of Russian production also take place periodically: in 2020, the premieres of the projects "MTV K-pop Show" and "Fan will answer" took place. Also, such cult programs as "Good Morning" and "12 Angry Viewers" began to appear on the updated TV channel again.

In mid-March 2022, due to the invasion of Ukraine, Paramount, which owns the MTV brand, decided to suspend its activities in Russia. Initially, the MTV channel (along with all other TV channels of this company) planned to stop broadcasting in Russia on 20 April, but eventually broadcasting was discontinued on 28 April. Thematic music TV channels of the same brand — "MTV Live", "MTV 80s", "MTV 90s" and "MTV 00s" also stopped broadcasting in Russia. In the Commonwealth of Independent States (CIS), as well as Georgia, the broadcasting of Russian-language versions of MTV and other Paramount channels continued until 15 December.

On 14 December 2022, MTV Russia (alongside with MTV Live, MTV 80s, MTV 90s and MTV 00s) ceased broadcasting in Belarus. One day later on 15 December 2022, MTV Russia ceased broadcasting in the CIS at around 14:49 (Moscow time). The last program that was aired on the channel was the music program "More! Louder! Cooler!" (Больше! Громче! Круче!), with "Broken" (Сломана) by Serebro being the last music video to air on the channel.

== Ownership history ==
In 1998, Viacom International Media Networks Europe (VIMN Europe) signed a long-term agreement with Biz Enterprises to launch a 24-hour music channel in the Russian Federation. MTV became the first US television brand to localize in the Russian state. In 2002, Boris Zosimov sold his stake to the owner of the MTV brand to Viacom, after which he left the channel. At the same time, Viacom began to change the channel format on the model of the original MTV channel. In 2007, VIMN Europe signed a new agreement with Prof Media to operate and broadcast the channel along with VH1 Russia. Under Prof Media's ownership the channel moved from music orientated programming to youth-orientated programming. This move proved to be very unsuccessful for its new owners as research conducted by VIMN showed Russian viewers prefer music programming over reality based programming.

Prof Media announced in December 2012 that they would no longer operate MTV Russia from 1 June 2013 and would replace the channel with a new general entertainment channel called Friday!. On 30 May 2013 Viacom International Media Networks new division VIMA Russia announced it would relaunch MTV in Russia on 1 October 2013 which would be wholly operated by VIMN Russia in London. The relaunch will see many of its international programmes with Russian subtitles. As part of the relaunch MTV will launch 'The Face of MTV Russia' a contest to find a presenter for the channel to host MTV News.

A HD version of MTV Russia also launched on 1 October 2013. Paramount Networks Northern Europe (formerly Viacom International Media Networks Northern Europe) with their channels MTV Russia, VH1 Russia and Nickelodeon Russia is operated from their Moscow offices.

== Programming ==
=== Final programming ===
- 18+ Chart – Chart airs adult clips only in the night
- Awkward
- Catfish: The TV Show
- Class Hour (Russia)
- Daria
- Ex on the Beach
- Hot Right Now (music block)
- Jersey Shore (US, UK, Poland versions)
- MTV Dance Chart
- MTV Europe Music Awards
- MTV News in Russia – #MTVSelfieNews
- MTV Top 20 (a flagship music video countdown show hosted by MTV Russia's resident VJ)
- MTV Video Music Awards
- Rus Chart
- World Stage Live

=== Former programming ===
- Beauty and the Geek
- Boarding School (since 8 January 2013)
- Cheerful Morning
- City File
- The Club
- Entourage
- Euro Day (since 8 December 2018)
- Eurovision Diary (perennial)
- Holidays in Mexico (seasons 1–2)
- Live with Bilan (seasonal)
- Making the Video
- MTV Cribs
- MTV Live
- MTV News Block
- MTV News Block Daily
- MTV News Block Weekly
- MTV Russian Top 10
- My Super Sweet 16
- Naked Slow Business
- Next
- Night of Devourers of MTV (since 8 February 2013) – the greatest programmes of old MTV (1999–2002, 2004–2007)
- Oryol i Reshka (since December 2012)
- Parental Control (Russia)
- Pimp My Ride
- Program Minimum
- Project Runway Russia
- Room Raiders (Russia)
- Russian Top 10
- Scrubs
- Secret.net
- Sensation (2009, 2010, 2011, 2012)
- Silent Library
- South Park
- Stars. Here and Now
- Stereo Morning
- Ticket to Kiss
- Too Beautiful
- Trendy
- World Chart
- X-Play

=== Events broadcast on MTV Russia ===
- MTV Europe Music Awards
- MTV Video Music Awards
- MTV Movie Awards
- Isle of MTV

== Award shows ==
Following the success of the MTV Europe Music Awards, Viacom International Media Networks launched a localized awards show for Russia called MTV Russia Music Awards. The first awards show began in 2004 and aired on the channel annually until 2009. The awards show celebrated local and international artists. The 'Artist of the Year' award winner would go on to also win the winner of Best Russian Artist on the MTV Europe Music Awards. Russia is still represented at the MTV EMA's. Following on from the success of the local music awards show in Russia, 2006 saw the launch of MTV Russia Movie Awards. The awards show was presented by local and international actors such as Pamela Anderson in 2007 and Paris Hilton in 2008. The show was axed in April 2009.
