= Vasily Strelnikov =

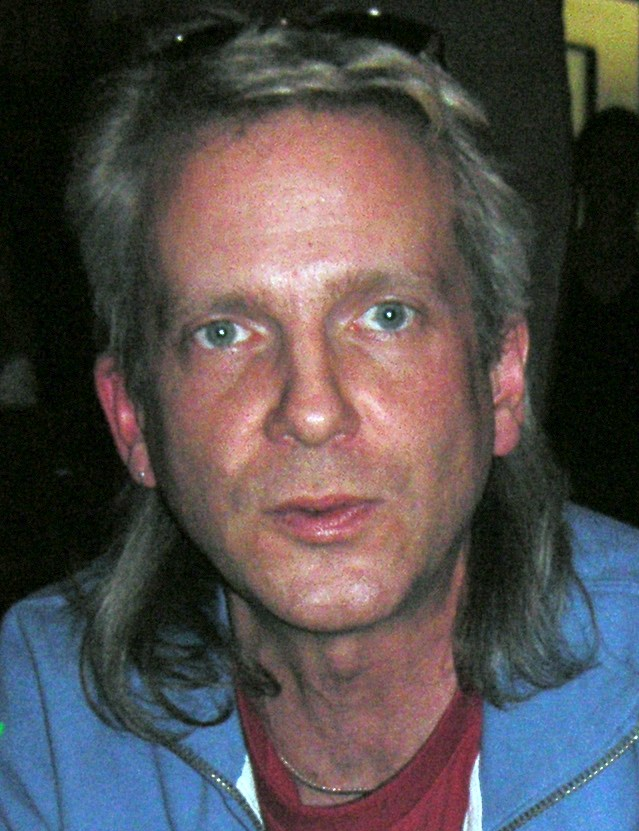
Strelnikov in 2006

Vasily Borisovic Strelnikov (Russian: 'Василий Боpисович Стрельников') is a Russian-American New York City-born VJ and DJ most commonly known to the Boomerang Generation as the voice behind MTV Russia from 1998 to 2002. Strelnikov's popularity was at its peak when he hosted the morning show Weekend's Whim (Викендный Каприз). He is currently associated with Radio Mayak.

Strelnikov was born in New York City on May 14, 1962 to Russian parents. His father, Boris Strelnikov, was a prominent Soviet-era journalist, who worked for many years as Pravda's correspondent in the United States. His mother was a Soviet embassy officer. Strenlikov holds dual American and Russian citizenship.

Strelnikov began his career as a radio presenter in the 1980s, working on shortwave radio for the Radio Moscow World Service. His 1990/1991 show, 'Vassily's Weekend' aired early on Sunday mornings, Moscow time. Vassily answered listener mail and played their requests. Some requests he played on Soviet National Radio were plainly in jest or as a protest against the regime, such as "Nikita", by Elton John, and "The Lumberjack Song", which he attributed to his KGB censors as "A Canadian Workers' Protest Song". He was best known as the host of the Listeners’ Request Club, one of Radio Moscow's most popular programmes which, due to its informal presentation, contrasted with most other shows on the station. During 2006, Strelnikov hosted Мозголомы - a Russian version of the Brainiac: Science Abuse TV programme on REN TV. As of 2007, he was hosting Упс! - another Russian TV programme.

From 2011 to 2015, he worked for Radio Moscow's successor, Voice of Russia, co-hosting the mailbag show, "From Moscow With Love". After Voice of Russia was dissolved at the end of 2014, the show was carried for several months on the Sputnik media platform that replaced it before ending in March 2015.

Strelnikov's father was a Soviet diplomat who, when Vassily was four years of age, was assigned to Washington D.C. His father served in this capacity for over a decade before being recalled to Russia for reassignment. Vassily Strelnikov went to American public schools and otherwise operated as an American boy. When he arrived in Russia for what amounted to the first time, Vassily was appalled at the dearth of Rock and Roll on the radio and vowed to change it, to work at the first Rock radio station in Russia, which he did after the dissolution of the USSR. The ten or twelve of his most formative years spent in the US explains his near lack of foreign accent and understanding of American culture.

In addition to his Soviet-era work on Radio Moscow, Vassily was invited back twice for stints at The Voice of Russia, Radio Moscow's successor. His show, From Russia With Love, was well-received and continued independently for some years as a podcast.
