= Name That Movie =

- Genre: quiz show
- Created by: Viktor Khomich
- Presented by: Sergey Belogolovtsev
- Country of origin: Russia
- Original language: Russian
- No. of seasons: 2
- No. of episodes: 40

Production
- Executive producers: Kirill Yemelyanov, Yekaterina Vasilyonok
- Producer: Ruben Oganesyan
- Production location: «Mosfilm» Film Studios
- Camera setup: multi-camera
- Running time: 23 minutes
- Production company: PLC «Everest»

Original release
- Network: Che
- Release: 25 April – 30 August 2016

Name That Movie (Russian: Угадай кино, romanized: Ugaday Kino) is a quiz show about Soviet movies where participants watch the movie and earn money for it. The grand prize is 90 000 rubles. The program premiered on April 25, 2016 on the Che. The quiz is hosted by Sergey Belogolovtsev.

== Rules ==
Three players participate. The host asks a question and they answer them by pressing the button before the other contestants. Correct answers win money. Incorrect answers do not. The amount increases in each round. At the end of three rounds the least successful player is dismissed and his money goes to the leader.

=== Round 1 ===
The players are offered short questions. 2 000 rubles is won for each correct answer.

=== Round 2 ===
The players watch a scene from an unnamed movie and must guess its name. The prize is 3 000 rubles, but decreases by 500 rubles after each 5 second interval.

=== Round 3 ===
Players watch a movie scene and must guess what happens in the next scene. The prize is 5 000 rubles for the first contestant, 3 000 for the second and 1 000 rubles for the third.

=== The final round ===
Two contestants participate in the last round. There are two final versions one of which the host selects.

==== Version 1 ====
The two remaining contestants watch fragments of 16 movies. The players must name each movie in order. Failing to do this costs the player all winnings. Each player may skip one movie, handing it to the opponent to answer.

==== Version 2 ====
Finalists are shown the freeze frames of seven movies. The players must name at least five of the seven movies. The winner may ask for "unfreezing" of the freeze frame, i.e. to show all the fragment, but this is only allowed once. The winner earns all winnings, earned by players during the entire game.

== Facts ==
- The first episodes were filmed on March 31, 2016 in the Mosfilm (Film Studios).
