= Yuri Senkevich =

Russian physician and television host (1937–2003)

Yuri Aleksandrovich Senkevich
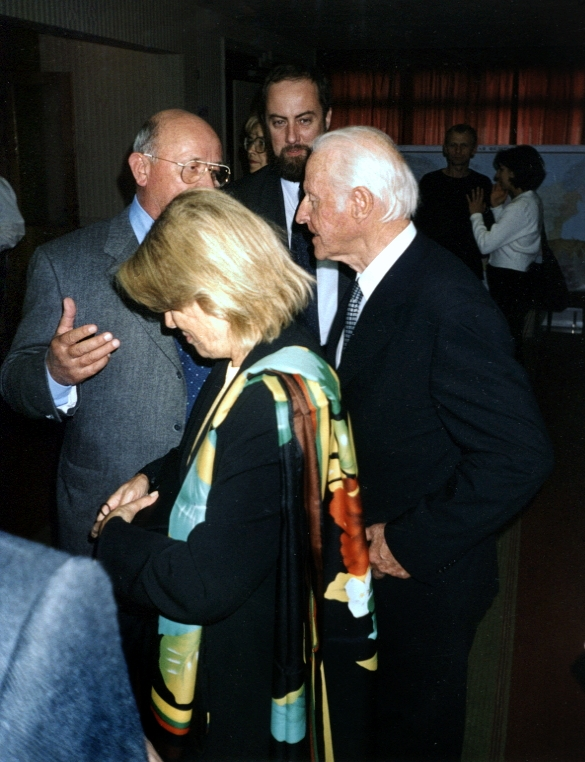
- Yuri Senkevich, Leonid Kolotilo and Thor Heyerdahl, the Congress of the Russian Geographical Society in Arkhangelsk, 2000. In the foreground standing sideways is Thor Heyerdahl's wife.
- Born: March 4, 1937; Choibalsan, Mongolia
- Died: September 23, 2003 (aged 66); Moscow, Russia
- Occupations: scientist, TV presenter

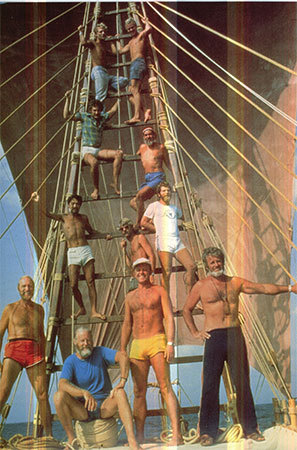
The crew of the reed boat Tigris in 1978. Thor Heyerdahl is sitting and on the right the Soviet doctor Yuriy Senkevich in yellow short trousers.

Yuri Aleksandrovich Senkevich (Russian: Юрий Александрович Сенкевич) (March 4, 1937 in Choibalsan, Mongolia – September 25, 2003 in Moscow, Russia) was a Soviet physician, voyager, scientist, and Candidate of Sciences (PhD equivalent degree).

Senkevich became famous in the USSR and worldwide for sailing with Thor Heyerdahl on the Ra Expedition.

Senkevich was born to Russian parents in Mongolia. In 1960, he graduated from the Military Medical Academy in Leningrad. After his graduation, he received an assignment as a military doctor. In 1962, Senkevich started at the Ministry of Defence's Moscow Institute of Aviation and Cosmic Medicine. On June 1, 1965, he was selected into Medical Group 2 (along with Yevgeni Illyin, Aleksandr Kiselyov) for the long-duration Voskhod flights in space, all of which were subsequently canceled to make way for the Soviet Moon program. All three were dismissed at the beginning of the following year. He continued his career in that field at the Institute of Medical and Biological Problems of the Ministry of Public Health. From 1966 to 1967, he participated in the twelfth Soviet Antarctic expedition at Vostok station.

In 1969, Thor Heyerdahl invited Senkevich to sail on the Ra papyrus boat, and later on Ra II in 1970. Yuri Senkevich also sailed on the Tigris across the Indian Ocean.

In 1973, Senkevich began his career as a host of the "Travelers' Club" (Клуб путешественников), a show on Soviet Central Television. Over the following 30 years, he visited more than 200 countries as a journalist. For his lifetime contribution to television, he was awarded the "TEFI" prizeby the Russian Academy of Television in 1997. Yuri Senkevich is in the Guinness Book of Records as "the world's longest serving TV anchorman".

He had a son, Nikolay Senkevich, who later became head of NTV. Senkevich died of heart failure.

== Other ==
The species of mites (family Spinturnicidae) Spinturnix senkevitchi is named in honor of Dr. Yuri A. Senkevitch (described by Maria Orlova and Nikolay Anisimov, leg. V.S. Lebedev)
