= Utilizator =

- Genre: game show
- Created by: Ruben Oganesyan, Yury Sidorenko, Kirill Yemelyanov
- Directed by: Sergei Vyrsky
- Creative director: Georgy Mheidze
- Presented by: Yury Sidorenko
- Composers: Sergei Avedov, Oleg Yarushin
- Country of origin: Russia
- Original language: Russian
- No. of seasons: 5
- No. of episodes: 130 (original); 140 (incl. remounted)

Production
- Executive producer: Arman Oganesyan
- Producer: Kirill Yemelyanov
- Production locations: Moscow, Tula Oblast (Seasons 1-3), Russia (mid. of Season 3)
- Camera setup: multi-camera
- Running time: 22 minutes (ep. 112-129); 25 minutes (Seasons 1-3); 48 minutes (Season 4-5)
- Production company: JSC «TV Daryal»

Original release
- Network: Che
- Release: October 26, 2015 – July 8, 2020

Utilizator (Russian: Утилизатор) is a RussianTV quiz show where car owners compete to earn money placed in a dustbin. The game is hosted by Yury Sidorenko, a professional mechanic. Prize money can be used to repair the winner's car, or transferred to a bank account, in which case the host destroys the car. The premier aired on October 26, 2015, on the Che channel.

In May 2016 the TV channel Che and Yury Sidorenko announced the continuation of the all-Russian car scrappage. The casting is at the Che official website where the owners of old cars sent their application to participate in Season 3 that was premiered on July 11 at the Che.

The car has been replaced to another one in Season 3 called «The loudest». If the host was going by Mercedes-Benz Vito in Seasons 1 and 2, while his is going by UAZ Patriot in Season 3.

From the middle of Season 3 called «All-Russian» the team of show went to rid the Russian cities from the auto junk.

The Che channel declares this new season starts on January 23, 2017, after a little bit break has been lasting. Old car owners are offered to visit website of the Che Channel (link) and applied at it to take part, a car owner must add his car picture and after to be waiting for when Yury Sidorenko, The «Utilizator» host, ringing you up.

In the Seasons 3-5, the crew of the show visited 34 Russian cities. A total of 100 people appeared, 86 of which utilized their cars.

On May 25, 2018, the show team launched an all-Russian casting for the season 5. Participation can be accepted by any Russian, who has an old car and a desire to earn money.

== Rules ==
The host finds out the cost of the car from an ad. The contestant is offered «Luck or Failure». If the host is able to start the car in 15 minutes and drive around, then he buys it at his price and if he cannot get the car to move, then he buys it at the price written in the ad.

If contestant isn’t satisfied with the host’s price, he can take the quiz. If the car failed to start, the contestant can play a game to increase the value of the car. The host and contestant go from the program car to the final designated, but while they move to the point designated by the host, he asks questions of varying difficulty: 9 multi-choice questions and one multi-choice question having no variants. One minute is given to answer the last question. Each right answer adds 5 000 rubles to the car price. At the final destination the host gives the choice to the contestant: either he spends money to repair his car (it is repaired over seven days). The contestant either takes the car or the money and leaves the car behind. The contestant has one minute to decide.

In season 5, changes were made to the rules: the "YES!" button was abolished, now the player receives 4,000 rubles for the correct answer to questions 1-3, 8,000 rubles for the correct answer to questions 4-9 and 20,000 rubles for the correct answer to the question 10. In order to collect the money, the participant needs to say the phrase "I do not need this car, I take the money." Thus, if the contestant answers all 10 questions correctly, then he can add a maximum of 80,000 rubles to the cost of the car. Also, he/she can now bargain.

== Facts ==
- The stunts are staged by the company 'Russian stuntmen'.
- The price of the cheapest car was 25 000 rubles, but the most expensive one is 118 000.
- Minimal real price of the car is 0 rubles (-4 400), but the maximum price is 72 600.
- Winnings ranged from 29 300 to 142 000 rubles.
- The oldest car was released in 1965 and the newest in 2009.
- Season 2 was filmed in Tula, Russia, but from 18 to 22 February 2016 it was filmed in Tula polygon
- Filming of the Season 3 took place in May and June 2016.
- The cleverest contestants were Yury (aired on 14 March 2016), Roman and Nadezhda (aired on 17 March 2016), Anna (aired on 12 July 2016), Klementy (aired on 21 July 2016), Ivan (aired on 4 October 2016), Alexander (aired on 11 September 2017), Alexey (aired on 28 September 2017), Nikolay (1 July 2019) and Ilya (aired on 3 July 2019). They were the only could answer 9 questions out of 10 correctly. Contestants Valery (aired on 3 November 2015), Daniel (aired on 22 March 2016) and Dmitry (aired on 29 March 2016) answered the fewest questions correctly only – 4 of 10.
- Two persons competed in episodes 24 and 70 in the quiz.
- According to the crew a filming of a car destruction lasting from 2 to 3 minutes on the TV screen lasts for no less than 3 hours.
- Since the season 3, the film crew visited of 34 cities in Russia: Astrakhan, Belgorod, Bryansk, Cheboksary, Chelyabinsk, Ivanovo, Izhevsk, Kazan, Kemerovo, Krasnodar, Krasnoyarsk, Moscow, Nizhny Novgorod, Novomoskovsk, Novosibirsk, Omsk, Oryol, Perm, Rostov-on-Don, Ryazan, Saint Petersburg, Samara, Saratov, Stary Oskol, Stavropol, Tolyatti, Tula, Tver, Ufa, Vladimir, Volgograd, Voronezh, Yaroslavl and Yekaterinburg.
- In episode 88, for the first time, they could not completely restore the participant's car; in the same episode, the participant himself took the car from the car service.
- In episode 103, the 100th car scrappage was carried out.
- In episode 104, the contestant gave a quick and correct answer to the 1st question before the host gave the answer options.
- The 127th episode received the largest number of views of all the Utilizator program episodes posted on the YouTube channel of the Che TV channel.
