= Sergey Druzhko =

Russian film actor and TV presenter

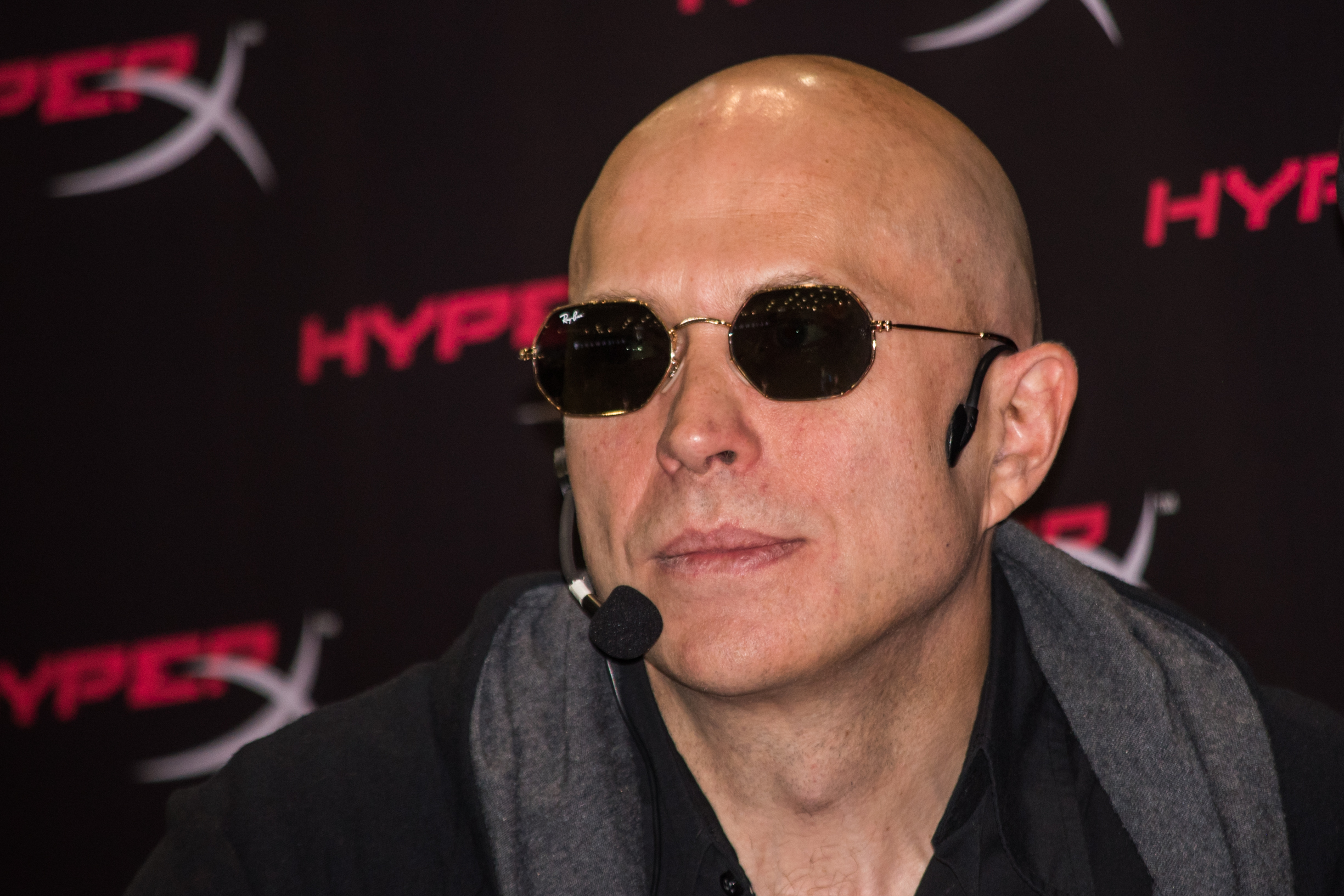
- Born: Sergey Yevgenyevich Druzhko; 3 November 1968 (age 57); Uralsk, Kazakh SSR, Soviet Union
- Occupations: Actor; TV presenter; vlogger
- Years active: 1984–present (acting career); 2017–present (YouTube career)

YouTube information
- Channel: Druzhko Show
- Subscribers: 1.94 million
- Views: 138 million
- Last updated: 2 September 2024

Sergey Yevgenyevich Druzhko (Russian: Серге́й Евге́ньевич Дружко́; born 3 November 1968, Uralsk, USSR) is a Russian film actor and TV presenter. From 2005 till 2008 he was a presenter of the popular TV show Inexplicable, yet a Fact. As of 2018 he is a web-based videoblogger of the "Druzhko Show", which has 2.6 million subscribers on YouTube.

== Biography ==
He was born on 3 November 1968, in the city of Uralsk.

In 1990 he graduated from the Russian State Institute of Performing Arts, played major roles in the educational theater "Na Mokhovaya".

After graduation, he lived in England for more than a year.

On his return to Russia, he worked as a DJ at a radio station, a referent to the chief of the forensic medical service on international issues, an organizer of tours of theatrical collectives, and as an organizer and manager of branded retail chains. He recorded several music CDs, performed with solo bardic programs.

In 2003 he moved to Moscow, where he graduated from VGIK with a degree in film-making. From 2005 to 2008, he was one of the authors and host of the program "Inexplicable, yet a Fact" on Russian TV channel TNT, where he received reports of clashes with various mystical anomalies, and then carried out investigations into their materials. He also collaborated with the Ren-TV channel, being the host of the program "Fantasy Stories".

In May 2016 he recorded the song "Our Crimea" («Наш Крым»), and later in an interview he stated that considers Crimea a historical Russian territory. Ukrainian website Myrotvorets included him in their database for this fact.

8 years later after the closure of the program "Inexplicable, yet a Fact", Druzhko gained popularity on the Internet. In 2016, the social network VKontakte began to gain popularity a community which published short videos cut from the program, in which the actor pronounces "capacious phrases" for all occasions. In November 2016, as a demonstration of the work of the algorithm that helps to group VKontakte posts in the user's tape for similar topics, VKontakte employees created a bot that responds to users' messages using clips with Druzhko's participation.

On 23 April 2017 on YouTube was published the first issue of "Druzhko Show". The video quickly became popular – in a week it was watched by seven million people, and about a million users subscribed to the channel. In the show, the actor, who acts as the host, parodies himself, deliberately and amateurishly telling about the funny moments on the Internet, and also trying to see everywhere the plot and mysticism. In less than two months, the channel has gained more than 2.7 million subscribers, becoming one of the most popular Russian-language channels on YouTube.

He is married to actress Olga Chursina; has three sons.

== Selected filmography ==
- 1999: Streets of Broken Lights (Улицы разбитых фонарей) as Maître d'hôtel
- 2006: Tainy Sledstviya (Тайны следствия-3. Бумажная работа)
- 2006: Russian Translation (TV series) (Русский перевод) as Gennadiy Ivashchenko (Геннадий Иващенко)
