= TV Park =

Russian television magazine

- Editor-in-chief: Ksenia Dmitriyeva
- Categories: entertainment industry news
- Frequency: weekly
- Circulation: 350,000
- Publisher: Media Park
- Founder: Nikolay Chernonog
- First issue: 1994
- Country: Russia
- Based in: Moscow
- Language: Russian
- Website: www.tv-park.ru

TV Park (Russian: ТВ Парк) was a Russian weekly television listings magazine, published by Media Park. As well as programme details, the publication also features articles on current TV events, films, sports news, music, a horoscope, and such regular columns as Person of the Week, Photo Project, Personal Life, Dynasty, and Mysteries.

The first issue of the magazine was released in March 1994, making it the first Russian TV listings magazine. Targeted at "the middle class", TV Park is one of Russia's leading weeklies: as of 2010, it was the 3rd most popular magazine in Moscow, 10th in Saint Petersburg, and nationally in 9th place overall.

The magazine was founded by, and belongs to, the general director of Media Park, Nikolay Chernogog. TV Park is the official sponsor of the TEFI television award.
