= Inexplicable, yet a Fact =

- A frame from the original opening sequence
- Genre: Docufiction
- Narrated by: Sergey Druzhko, Svetlana Starikova
- Composer: Andrey Zolotarev aka C.J.Shurup
- Country of origin: Russia
- Original language: Russian
- No. of seasons: 3
- No. of episodes: 149

Production
- Running time: 42 minutes
- Production company: Soho Media (then known as Soho Production)

Original release
- Network: TNT (Russian TV channel)
- Release: March 3, 2005 – July 19, 2008

A frame from the opening sequence. (Note: Showcasing the response of the graphic designer of the series Inexplicable, yet a Fact to the famous X-Files punchline, "The Truth is Out There." The artist's depiction of a blurred six-fingered grey alien's head and hand, with the blurred Inexplicable, yet a Fact logo on its palm, is accompanied with the caption "Alien image 321b/3" (in black) and the grammatically-incorrect subcaption "ALIENS IS OVER THERE" (in white): another piece of evidence to the claim that the information presented by the series is underverified.)

Inexplicable, yet a Fact (Russian: Необъяснимо, но факт, often abbreviated as ННФ and has also been translated as 'Inexplicable, but Factual') was a popular TV show on TNT.

== Content ==
=== Video ===
Videographically, the TV show features a roughly even blend of footage recorded originally and short sequences of shots from motion pictures. For this reason, Inexplicable, yet a Fact has featured a large number of films from experimental (notably, Jean-Pierre Jeunet's The Bunker of the Last Gunshots) to mainstream (notably, Bram Stoker's Dracula), with the heavier inclusion of the Qatsi trilogy, Mondo cane, and BBC documentaries (notably The Planets, The Human Body).

Stills showcasing themes of narration (such as images of books, people, and phenomena mentioned) are also present.

=== Audio ===
Inexplicable, yet a Fact features a bed of a roughly even blend of popular music (notably, soundtracks to the Matrix trilogy and Tom Clancy's Splinter Cell: Chaos Theory, Depeche Mode's album Playing the Angel, Skunk Anansie's popular single Charlie Big Potato, and tracks from Café del Mar's music compilations) and tracks from production music libraries.

== Release ==
The anthology television series Inexplicable, yet a Fact was shown on Russian TV channel TNT.

The title was translated as Inexplicable, but Factual at the Stalker Human Rights Film Festival in 2009.

== Impact ==
Inexplicable, yet a Fact is among the earliest pseudo-documentary projects on the Russian television and has influenced several similar projects on other Russian TV channels: Fantastical Stories (REN TV), Cannot Be! (STS (TV channel)), X Files (DTV), and others. The series has begun shortly after Syfy's Ghost Hunters, possibly influenced by the success of the series, and before Discovery Channel's A Haunting. Inexplicable, yet a Fact, as well as the aforementioned pseudo-documentaries, root in Chariots of the Gods (film), with Inexplicable, yet a Fact heavily using the footage and ideas from the film in several episodes.

== Criticism ==
The TV show has spread irrational, superstitious, and pseudoscientific belief in alien abductions, extrasensory perception, astrology, spiritism, numerology, palmistry, and related areas of human activity to the TNT viewers (mostly, the adolescent demographic).

=== Comicality ===
The active fan-community of the program exists on VK (social network), titled We are laughing at Inexplicable, yet a Fact (originally, Угарающие по "Необъяснимо, но факт"), which, together with TNT's mostly comic content (notably Comedy Club) and comic promotional videos, suggests that Inexplicable, yet a Fact is a parody of related television projects about mysticism, although the show presents itself in a grave, serious manner.
