= Man vs Fly =

- Genre: game show
- Presented by: Dmitry Guberniyev, Roman Vagin
- Country of origin: Russia
- Original language: Russian
- No. of seasons: 1

Production
- Camera setup: multi-camera
- Running time: 3 minutes 30 seconds
- Production company: PLC «M-Production»

Original release
- Network: Che

Man vs Fly (Russian: Человек против мухи) is an entertainment game show. Premiered on 13 March 2016 on Che channel. It is hosted by Dmitry Guberniyev and Roman Vagin. It's the Russian version of British show Man vs Fly.

== Rules ==
Eight battles are in one episode (each battle is one episode running 3 minutes 30 seconds). Celebrities and usual contestants are competing in a hilarious battle against the ordinary fly in small white room. The ‘chocolate’ girl and ordinary persons are among them. The configured fighters is given one minute to beat an annoying fly. For struggle against the fly contestants face in different sorts and with various items, such as the ventilator, the slippery Northern pike, PP Duster, a spell book, a guitar, a towel, blender, a racquet and even a ping-pong ball. It's strictly prohibited to use hands. If the insect was successful beaten, then the contestant earns 1 000 rubles.

== Facts ==
- As of March 10, 2016 was filmed 64 episodes.
