= Oba-na! =

- Genre: Comedy
- Created by: Igor Ugolnikov
- Composer: Sergey Chekryzhov
- Countries of origin: Soviet Union; Russia
- Original language: Russian
- No. of seasons: 3

Production
- Production location: Moscow
- Production company: ATV

Original release
- Network: Programme One (1990–1991); Channel One (1992–1995)
- Release: November 19, 1990 – June 1995

Related
- Dobry vecher

Oba-na! (Russian: О́ба-На) was a Soviet and Russian comedy television program that aired on Channel One and ATV from November 1990 until June 1995.

The first episode of Oba-na! was aired in 1990.

Launched in the twilight of the Soviet Union, the show challenged convensions of Soviet television with its irreverent and often absurdist humor. Its best known sketch, "Funeral of Food," parodied the solemn televised funerals of Soviet leaders to satirize food shortages and empty stores.

Oba-na! became the first winner of the Gold Ostap premium.

The actors from Oba-na! sang the Soviet national anthem in a jazz/rock style.

The last episode of Oba-na! was aired in June 1995.
