= All or Nothing (game show) =

- Presented by: Nikolai Fomenko
- Country of origin: Russia
- No. of episodes: 54

Production
- Running time: 50 minutes (with commercials)

Original release
- Network: Channel One
- Release: 20 September 2004 – 5 January 2005

All or Nothing (Russian: Пан или пропал, romanized: Pan ili propal) is a game show which aired on the Russian Channel One. It was one of the Russian versions of the Deal or No Deal show. The host was Nikolai Fomenko and the grand prize is 3,000,000 Russian ruble (about US$102,700). It was premiered on 20 September 2004.

== Box Values ==
Left Side	Right Side
0.01	10,000
Joke prize	15,000
1	25,000
5	50,000
10	100,000
Joke prize	200,000
100	300,000
500	500,000
1,000	750,000
2,500	1,000,000
5,000	3,000,000

== Link ==
Official Website
