= Novators =

Russian animated television series

Novators (Russian: Новаторы, romanized: Novatory) is a Russian popular-science cartoon which tells about the inventions of Russian scientists.

== Plot ==
It all starts on an ordinary day, when an alien literally falls on the heads of perfectly ordinary school children. The kids quickly find a common language with the visitor from space, and soon the fun intergalactic company is joined by a four-legged friend - hamster. The earthlings invited the alien to use an old refrigerator to use as spare parts for the broken flying saucer. But the refrigerator instead becomes useful in order to create a time machine for him.

The curiosity of the heroes leads them into a totally unexpected situation. They find themselves having to cope with the breakdown of the time machine, cold glacial period, unfriendly Papuan tribe.

Knowledge, wit, friendship and the ability to do something with their hands help the friends successfully overcome all difficulties while making different scientific discoveries.

== Background ==
All of the inventions that aid the heroes of the cartoon are based on original ideas and patented inventions by Russian scientists.

== Characters ==
Phill is 12-year-old captain of a group of young explorers who travel through time and space of human imaginations and intellect

Nana is Phil's younger sister.

Neo (Neon) is a charming alien from the planet Yum, who appeared on Earth because his flying saucer broke down. The accident happened near the house Phil and Nana, who invited Neo to stay with them in the attic.

Tesla is a prankish pet hamster, saved by the children from the cat. He loves to eat and consumes a lot of food. Was the absolute master of the attic, before the alien appeared. Fortunately, Tesla and Neo quickly found a common language.

== Episodes ==
1. Kinky Guests of the Old Attic
2. Include Helpful Blob
3. Operation "Clean Hands"
4. Time Fridge
5. Mask of the Ice Age
6. The Magic Power of Stormy Water
7. Treasure of Zapatista Bottle
8. Dental Magic
9. When Cans Are Closing
10. Adventure with a Twinkle
11. For the Phantom with a Lantern
12. The Smoke of the Stone Age
13. Royal Fir-tree
14. The Energy of Sea Tides
15. How to Swell the Enemy
16. Miracle-fuel
17. Underwater Safari
18. Hunters
19. Tent of Hawaiian Plaksa
20. Magic Wand the Navigator
21. Marathon Flight
22. Jumping on the Water
23. At Leonardo
24. Clean Thing
25. Humpbacked Horse with the Motor
26. Service for Rome

== See also ==
- History of Russian animation

== Links ==
- Official website
- Carousel channel
