= Travelers' Club =

Travelers' Club (Russian: Клуб путешественников, romanized: Klub puteshestvennikov) was a Soviet and Russian television program dedicated to the popularization of tourism and travel. Was in a televised broadcast from 18 March 1960 and at first was called Narrators Club . From 1991 to 2003 the program was on the Channel One Russia. During this time there were more than 2000 issues. The transfer was entered in the Guinness Book of Records as the oldest Russian television program.

The first presenter of the program was Vladimir Schneiderov. Then for 30 years (since 1973) program led the doctor and the famous traveler Yuri Senkevich. After the death of the master program was closed in October 2003.

Permanent special correspondent from 1977 to 1992 was Stanislav Pokrovsky.

transfer guests were such famous explorers as Thor Heyerdahl, Fyodor Konyukhov, Jacques-Yves Cousteau, Bernhard Grzimek, Haroun Tazieff, Carlo Mauri, Bruno Vailati, Jacques Mayol, Jacek Pałkiewicz, Vladimir Chukov and others.

The program has received a number of international and national awards: TEFI (1997), Crystal Globe.
