= Calambur =

Ukrainian-Russian 1996 television programme

- VHS cover
- Also known as: Full House, Kalambur
- Genre: Sketch show
- Created by: Yuri Stytskovsky
- Directed by: Yuri Stytskovsky
- Starring: Yuri Stytskovsky; Aleksey Agopyan; Vadim Nabokov; Sergey Gladkov; Tatyana Ivanova
- Narrated by: Yuri Stytskovsky
- Theme music composer: Eduard Tsiselsky
- Opening theme: "Calambur"
- Ending theme: "Calambur"
- Composers: Eduard Tsiselsky; Oleg Mikhayluta
- Country of origin: Ukraine
- Original language: Russian
- No. of seasons: 6
- No. of episodes: 135 (13 and 30 n/a)

Production
- Executive producer: Irina Kozyr
- Producers: Eduard Verkhoturov; Yuri Volodarsky
- Production locations: Kharkiv; Odesa
- Camera setup: Sergey Butyrin
- Running time: 25–30 min
- Production companies: Calambur Pictures; Privat TV; CIZ; Volax Productions; Comedy TeleELEvision; AFL Productions

Original release
- Network: Channel One Russia (ORT); Russia 1 (RTR)
- Release: 1996 – 2001

Related
- S.O.S.

Calambur (Ukrainian: Каламбу́р, Russian: Каламбур, Pun) is a Ukrainian sketch comedy TV show that was first aired on October 12, 1996 on Russian TV channel ORT (now Channel One Russia). It combines slapstick humor and stand-up elements to create what its creators describe as "video comics".

In early 2001, with the unanimous decision of the cast and producer, Calambur was ended.

== Production ==
In 1992 the clown trio Magazine «Foo» (Russian: Магазин «Фу») consisted of Sergey Gladkov, Tatyana Ivanova and Vadim Nabokov, and the comic troupe Sweet Life (Russian: Сладкая жизнь), with actors Yuri Stytskovsky and Aleksey Agopyan, joined popular Odesa comic troupe Maski (Russian: Маски). Their debut on TV was characterized by episodic and several main roles in Maski Show, a series of silent comedy movies that put slapstick and eccentricity into sitcom-style storytelling. Later, five actors created their own group, Full House (Russian: Фул Хаус). The name was motivated by the actors' specialization — three clowns and two comics, like in the poker hand, and a pun, which they roughly translate on Russian as "house full of fools".

The idea of "video comics" was created by Gladkov and Nabokov. The first two sketch movies of Magazine «Foo» characters were made in 1992 and 1993 as Snow Show (one of them was later used in the first New Year episode of Calambur). On the production of the TV show Anshlag they met comic actors Ilya Oleynikov and Yuri Stoyanov and decided to complete their "clown comics" with dialogue, but the actors could not arrange about location of production (Odesa in Ukraine or Saint Petersburg in Russia). Later this idea was realized after creating of Full House.

The production of the first 12 episodes of Full House show started in April 1996 in Kharkiv, at the studio of TV channel Privat TV. Yuri Stytskovsky became director, while his wife Irina Kozyr was executive producer. The first general producer of show was Eduard Verkhoturov of CIZ creative group. A demo tape with the first five pilot episodes was shown to direction of one of major Russian TV channels, ORT. It was accepted with a request to change the name and the Cabaret-inspired appearance of the host character (Yuri Stytskovsky); yet he is still seen in the opening title sequence of the final version. The show was renamed to Calambur, with the changing of several lines in the closing theme song, and sketches with host and makeup artist (Aleksey Agopyan) were reshot. For making a contract with the channel, Irina Kozyr invited producer Yuri Volodarsky, who closely worked with Maski.

Starting from the second season, production was relocated to Odesa, at the Odesa Film Studio.

In 2000 by the decision of general producer Yuri Volodarsky, Calambur moved to RTR TV channel for one season. This was due to ORT financial problems that began after the russian economic crisis, and a change in management policy. After the filming of new sketches ceased, the writers created digest series assembled from previously shown episodes.

No later than 2004 a global edit of all episodes was made, which "created" originally nonexistent 13 and 30 episodes, divided last New Year special episode on two parts and added three more episodes with previously unused sketches.

All animated sequences and intros for the show were produced by Odesa Animation Studio, which also worked with other Ukrainian comedy shows of the time, such as above mentioned Maski Show and Gentleman Show.

== End ==
In early in 2001, after the broadcast of its sixth season, with the unanimous decision of the cast and producer, production of show was stopped and Calambur was soon ended.

Yuri Stytskovsky continued making his own movies and TV projects (mostly sitcoms), while Sergey Gladkov, Tatyana Ivanova and Vadim Nabokov continued their theatrical activity as a Calambur (or Fool's Village) comic group, with actor Oleg Kolchin as Medved, and sometimes affiliating with Maski. Aleksey Agopyan has since participated in various Ukrainian and Russian movies and TV series (mostly in episodic roles), including Stytskovsky's projects, and several theatrical performance, sometimes with the mentioned comic groups and in the duet Odekolon with former Maski actor Vladimir Komarov.

In 2003 Gladkov, Nabokov and Agopyan planned to make a Fool's Village spin-off about Muzhik and Moryachok being at the North Pole with a polar bear, but it didn't rise for unknown reasons. At the Odesa Animation Studio they later produced the animated shorts series S.O.S., where fools were also on a desert island.

Plans on making new Calambur episodes were later mentioned in 2008 and 2011 but this didn't occur, presumably due to disagreements in the cast.

== Sketches ==
=== The Host and the Helper ===
The full name of the show was Magazine of video comics «Calambur» (Russian: Журнал видео комиксов «Каламбур»). The series was presented as a comic magazine and composed of different "rubrics". Rubrics are usually introduced to "readers" by the Host (Yuri Stytskovsky), who turns pages and conflicts with the unmindful Helper (Aleksey Agopyan). In the third and fourth seasons this gag was replaced with just Host alone, who introduced sketches via a giant illustrated magazine and sometimes appeared in various suits, talking with puns about his "new TV series in the making", or interacting with an audience of caricatured cardboard people. In the fifth season page turn gags weren't used, and in the sixth season the comic-book style of the show was completely removed, with quarrels of Host and Helper complemented by fake live transmissions with the audience via telephone booth and troubles with the broadcast control desk.

=== Bar "Calambur" ===
Bar "Calambur" (Russian: Бар «Каламбур») — set in a simple bar at the city. All characters talk with sped-up high-pitched voices (actually voiced by one actor) and speech bubbles appearing on screen.

- The Bartender (Aleksey Agopyan) — presumably the main worker of the bar, most of the time imperturbable, sometimes jokes on visitors.
- The Waitress (Tatyana Ivanova) — a blonde lady who endlessly talks on the telephone near the entrance, making the Bartender angry or clients wait too long.
- The Cook (Yuri Stytskovsky) — a large man with doubtful talents in cookery, but saying that would be an act of foolishness. He's also used by Bartender and Waitress as a bouncer.
- The Frequenter (or Drunkard) (Vadim Nabokov) — a regular guest of the bar, wears a hat and typically sits at bar desk in a sketch's beginning. Most of his dialogues with other characters are well-known drink-themed jokes or anecdotes.
- The Loser (Sergey Gladkov) — a clumsy man with glasses who always lacks money. Most of the time he orders a glass of boiled water, and as for meals he gets the worst dishes from the bar's kitchen and tries to raise jack over that. Sometimes he comes to the bar already drunk.
- Madam (Vadim Nabokov) — a chesty lady with heavy makeup and red wig, she works as a prostitute, sometimes waiting for clients outside of the bar. She always tries to get compliments from bar workers or visitors or seduce them, but everyone is only joking on her, after which she only says "Cad" (Russian: "Хам") to them.
- The Rocker (Yuri Stytskovsky) — a fearsome biker looking man with a ZZ Top tattoo on right hand. He always finds a reason to beat up someone in the bar and orders a bucket of vodka.
- Episodic characters:
  - Loser's girlfriend (Aleksey Agopyan) — clumsy and unlucky just as her boyfriend, she gets drunk after a single glass of soda. She appeared in three episodes.
  - Bar's owner (Sergey Gladkov) — appeared in one episode after Rocker started a brawl in the bar.
  - Madam's friend (Sergey Gladkov) — almost identical to the lady mentioned above, with the exception of hair color, appeared in one episode.

=== The Nose Dive ===
The Nose Dive (Russian: Крутое пике) is a parody on American disaster films with all characters talking broken English with VHS-esque one-voice translation and occasionally breaking the fourth wall. Every episode is accompanied by CGI footage of a falling airplane (in first episodes were used fragments of Airbus A340 demo footage) and starts with a relatively long introduction with a nervous air traffic controller (Sergey Gladkov) in the background: "Airliner Broiler 747" (an allusion on TWA Flight 800, when a Boeing 747 crashing into the Atlantic Ocean) during 325 episodes. The crew of airliner valiantly fighting to save the lives of passengers. Starring..."

- Resilient and courageous Commander (Yuri Stytskovsky) — always making fun of the rest of aircrew or passengers over their coming death and weak hopes and right away laughs at his own jokes on camera. He also pretends to have dementia (or actually has it) and always asks who just entered the cockpit or sometimes does any other thing except piloting the plane or trying to save the situation.
- Inventive and resourceful second pilot Drinkins (Aleksey Agopyan) — the main victim of Commander's tricks, he is nervous, sentimental and cowardly, trying to do something with their disaster. In the first episodes he also tried to calm down with alcohol, cigarettes, drugs and knitting.
- Cute and imperturbable Stewardess (Tatyana Ivanova) — most of the time she enters the cockpit to complain over "problems in the passenger class", after which she gets an advice from Commander. She sometimes sympathizes with almost crying Drinkins or plays along with Commander's jokes.
- Dispassionate and charming radioman Morse (Vadim Nabokov) — doesn't fit his own description: he has a facial tic and a stutter. He enters the cockpit mostly to pass a phone call, radiogram, newspaper, message from a flight mechanic or the air traffic control tower of Los Angeles, or the current state of the plane. He is the second victim of Commander's jokes after Drinkins.
- And Incomparable Miss Murple as Miss Burple (Sergey Gladkov) — a large lady in a red dress with a big hat and heavy makeup, she is the main source of "problems in the passenger class", but is actually seen only in the introduction and in the end of 28 episode.

=== Iron Kaput ===
Iron Kaput (Russian: Железный капут) was created as a replacement for The Nose Dive, sharing similar touches (long intro, German speech with dub translation and footage of transport between sketches), but remained only for one season. It starts with a compilation of military footage from the beginning of the 20th century and monotonous narration, like in a documentary film: "In the beginning of XX century in military laboratories of First Reichschmacht was created super secret tank which had military power and weaponry ahead of its time. For testing tank and not destroying Europe before given time, it was sent in Central Africa for taking over unruly Zusu (allusion on Zulu). After some time, for security reasons, everyone who knew about this project were eliminated and the tank was forgotten. Yet its fearless crew have not forgotten about their great mission and was ready to accomplish their duty. In the annals of history this secret project was called "Iron Kaput"." Sketches take place inside of the tank and rarely near Zusu village. The tank itself is far from the definition of Wunderwaffe as it has a lot of flaws in its construction and injudicious weapons. It's presented as a radio-controlled replica of World War I panzer with desert camouflage.

- Major Baron von Schwalzkopf XII (Yuri Stytskovsky) — the commander of the tank, referred to as Herr Major by other tank crew members (the word "Herr" is pronounced using an updated transcription that which sounds like a euphemism of a Russian vulgar slang word, unlike the traditional transcription which is now pronounced with a hard g). Proud and not very smart, he calls everyone "dummkopf" ("blockhead") while his "wise" decisions end up with explosions inside of the tank, his torn up uniform and his shout "Ha-a-ans".
- Hans Schmulke (Aleksey Agopyan) — gun-layer and the only technician of the tank. He isn't particularly smart, but at least he thinks about the consequences. Aside from servicing machines, he likes to read, listen to music, dance, etc. Whenever an explosion in the tank is unavoidable, he runs away to bring commander a new pair of gallifet trousers after blast.
- Drankel (from "drunk") (Sergey Gladkov) and Zhrankel (from "жрать", "fress") (Vadim Nabokov) — two fat private soldiers who actually fit under commander's swears. As their names suggest, one is always seen with a beer stein and other with a chain of bockwurst. Most of the time Herr Major checks their knowledge of military terms and laws or their physical endurance with fast push ups.
- Zusu (Aleksey Agopyan, Vadim Nabokov) — two members of the Zusu tribe who laugh over mistakes and futile attempts of invaders and fire their "weaponry" at the tank while being in the trenches.

=== Fool's Village ===
Fool's Village (Russian: Деревня дураков) is the most well-known and iconic sketch series which appear in every season. It has separate VHS releases and remains popular presently. It is the longest by run time. It is based on characters and early performances of Magazine «Foo» and is set as a silent slapstick comedy with clowns (in later seasons they have high-pitched dialogue). The action takes place in a courtyard and inside of a house of the main characters, a married couple.

- The Man (Мужик; Sergey Gladkov) — the husband, has a long mustache and red nose. Some time ago he was a pilot and even got the cross of St. George for an unknown act of bravery, but at the present time he has become a lazy drunkard. He likes hunting and fishing and always tries to get samagon under the nose of his harsh wife.
- The Woman (Баба; Tatyana Ivanova) — the housewife, always wearing a long green dress (in the first two seasons it is blue). Most of the time she represses Man' behaviors to getting drunk with aid of a frying pan and other houseware. At the same time she cuckolds her husband with his best friend.
- The Silly Sailor (Морячок-дурачок; Vadim Nabokov) — as his name suggests, he is cheerful and silly. He always greets people with a shake of the big orange pom-pom of his sailor cap. He is Man's best friend who shares his interests and hits on the head from Woman, but at the same time he is the housewife's lover.
- The Bear, also referred to as Misha (Aleksey Agopyan) — a forest neighbor, simple-minded and almost harmless, and because of that he often gets beaten up for no visible reason. He sometimes helps mentioned above, sometimes steals honey from beehive or picking berries near the house, and sometimes works as postman.
- The Bee — appears as a bizarre looking puppet and lives in a beehive in the courtyard. It is hostile most of the time, which makes it some kind of guarding animal. Sometimes the beehive is also used as a post box or safe.
- Some episodic characters:
  - The Sailor Lady (Aleksey Agopyan) — Silly Sailor's wife, who presumably still serves in the navy. Whenever she spots her husband getting drunk or cheating on her, Sailor Lady beats him up with an anchor or her fists. She appeared only in three episodes (the first time played by Tatyana Ivanova).
  - The She-Bear (Aleksey Agopyan) — Bears's wife, who wears a headscarf and apron. Her weapons of choice are a log and bench. She appeared only in two episodes.
  - Ded Moroz (Aleksey Agopyan) and Snegurochka (Tatyana Ivanova) — appear in episodes of the special New Year VHS tape.
  - Leonid Yakubovich as himself in one episode of said New Year tape.
  - Chort (Aleksey Agopyan) and Chertovka (Tatyana Ivanova) — a couple of chorts, appeared in one episode.
  - Relatives from other lands sending mail and gifts to main characters, they are identical but wear the corresponding national outfit, with the exception of Zaporizhia ones: their behaviors are total opposites, with a house working husband, drunkard wife and her pal — a cheerful sailor lady.

==== See also ====
- Punch and Judy

=== Less popular and short-lived ===
- Our little Aperitif (Russian: Наш аперитивчик) — random short sketches at the beginning of the show which should "create reader's humoristic appetite" for the next rubrics. It has a further recurring pair of robbers in a striped prison uniform — the smart but unlucky Chef (Aleksey Agopyan) and his big but simple-minded partner Fool (Yuri Stytskovsky). Sometimes sketches star Muzhik and Moryachok, especially ones based on aphorisms.
- Under the sound of "P" (Russian: Под звуком «Пи») — a talk show that was, as the host (Yuri Stytskovsky) says in the intro, copied after the American talk-show Without a Shadow of Doubt. The host talks with guests of the show (other actors) about various things, but words characterizing the theme of the talk are replaced by censoring "P" sound, creating an illusion of an inappropriate nature of talk. In the end the host whispers what word was "under the sound of "P"."
- You wrote, we played (Russian: Вы написали — мы сыграли) — a replacement of the Aperitif rubric for the third and fourth seasons, featuring sketches written by viewers for a contest. Most of the sent stories were already well-known among people or were harmless, making the actors come up with half of the rubric's content by themselves.
  - Sensation by any price (Russian: Сенсация любой ценой) — four sketches, written by one of the viewers, about professor (Aleksey Agopyan) and his unlucky partner Max (Yuri Stytskovsky). Max always becomes the victim of the professor's forgetfulness, after which he says "I'll kill you, professor!", but every time he's dragged into a new invention's test by promising, "This is gonna be a sensation."
- X, or streets of Y (Russian: X, или улицы Y) — another take on random sketches, but with changing titles, which are a parody on the name of the popular in 1999 Russian detective TV series Streets of Broken Lights or just Menty ("cops" for Militsiya).
- Who's There? (Russian: Кто там?) — sketches set near the entry door of an apartment, for example, the arriving of drunk pals to their hung over friend. The most recurring character of this rubric is stereotypical Odessian Alfred Rabinovich (Aleksey Agopyan).
- Black in White (Russian: Чёрное в белом) — dark humor sketches about medics and their patients, most of them based on well known anecdotes.
- Tales from the Infirmary (Russian: Байки из лазарета) — presumably a prequel for Iron Kaput, occurring in 1914 on the battlefields of World War I, with Herr Major becoming Herr Doktor and Drunken and Zhranken being sanitars.
- Miners (Russian: Шахтёры) — actually an untitled rubric with two miners, Vasilich (Vadim Nabokov) and Petrovich (Aleksey Agopyan), talking to each other while slowly moving a minecart in the tunnel.
- Men's Stories (Russian: Мужские истории) — short sketches set in a pub, which are mostly known for intrusive product placements of the current sponsor of the show. Most of the time it stars two pals, Vasily (Yuri Stytskovsky) and Aleksey (Aleksey Agopyan), drinking beer.
- From golden series of magazine «Calambur» (Russian: Из золотой серии журнала «Каламбур») — this rubric was in the premier versions of the first 11 episodes of the fifth season and consisted of the "best" sketches from previous seasons (with the exception of Fool's Village).

The fifth and sixth seasons also have various short and several long sketches that aren't presented as part of any above mentioned rubrics but serving same purpose as Aperitif rubric.
