= Channel One (Russia) =

Russian public TV channel

Channel One Первый канал
- Logo used since 2000
- Country: Russia
- Broadcast area: Worldwide
- Headquarters: Ostankino Technical Center, Moscow, Russia

Programming
- Language: Russian
- Picture format: 1080i HDTV (downscaled to 576i for the SDTV feed) 4K (during World Cup 2018)
- Timeshift service: 11 timeshift variants based on the Orbita system

Ownership
- Owner: (in 2023); Government of Russia (34.23%); VTB Bank (32.89%); National Media Group (19.46%); Sogaz (13.42%)
- Key people: Konstantin Ernst, CEO
- Sister channels: Karusel; Telecafe; Dom Kino; Music One TV; Vremya; Dom Kino Premium; Bober; Perviy Kanal Evraziya

History
- Launched: 22 March 1951; 75 years ago (original channel); 1 April 1995; 31 years ago (as present)
- Replaced: Ostankino Channel One
- Replaced by: LNK (May 1995, in Lithuania); Inter (1996, in Ukraine); ORT-Kazakhstan (1997, in Kazakhstan); ORT-Moldova (1999, in Moldova); ONT (2002, in Belarus)
- Former names: ORT (1995–2002)

Links
- Website: www.1tv.ru (Russian) www.1tv.com (Russian)

Availability

Terrestrial
- Digital terrestrial television: Channel 1

Streaming media
- Channel One internet broadcast: www.1tv.ru/live

Channel One (Russian: Первый канал, romanized: Pervyy kanal, IPA: [ˈpʲervɨj kɐˈnal], lit. 'First Channel') is a Russian federal television channel. Its headquarters are located at Ostankino Technical Center near the Ostankino Tower in Moscow. The majority of its shares are owned or indirectly controlled by the state.

It was created by decree of Russian president Boris Yeltsin to replace Ostankino Television Channel One, which in turn replaced Programme One in 1991.

From April 1995 to September 2002, the channel was known as Public Russian Television (Russian: Общественное Российское Телевидение, romanized: Obshchestvennoye Rossiyskoye Televideniye, ORT [oˈɛrˈtɛ]). The main news programmes are Vremya and Novosti.

Channel One's main competitors are the Russia-1, NTV, 5TV and TV Centre channels. The channel has over 2,900 employees as of 2023.

== History ==
When the Soviet Union was abolished, the Russian Federation took over most of its structures and institutions. One of the first acts of Boris Yeltsin's new government was to sign a presidential decree on 27 December 1991, providing for Russian jurisdiction over the central television system. The All-Union State Television and Radio Company (Gosteleradio) was transformed into the Russian State Television and Radio Company Ostankino, a shareholding company, with 51% of its shares remaining with the state.

Boris Abramovich Berezovsky, a Russian oligarch, gained control over ORT Television to replace the failing Programme One. He appointed the popular anchorman and producer Vladislav Listyev as the CEO of ORT. Three months later Listyev was assassinated amid a fierce struggle for control of advertising sales.

A presidential decree of 30 November 1994 transformed Ostankino into a closed joint-stock company, called Russian Public Television (Obshchestvennoe Rossiyskoye Televidenie, or ORT). The shares were distributed between state agencies (51%) and private shareholders, including numerous banks (49%). The partial privatization was inspired by the intolerable financial situation of Ostankino owing to huge transmission costs and a bloated payroll (total staff of about 10,000 in early 1995). In February 1995, the channel announced it would stop airing commercial advertising which was seen by network executives as a "source of great irritation and disappointment". It wasn't clear when the law would be passed; its lifting depended on the introduction of new advertising rules. After the fallout from Listyev's death on 1 March, Alexander Yakovlev resigned from his post as chairman, as the channel was facing an uncertain future on the verge of becoming ORT.

Following the 1998 financial collapse, which almost resulted in them becoming insolvent, the channel obtained a government loan of $100 million from state-controlled Vnesheconombank. Also in 1998, the closed joint stock company was transformed into an open stock company. However, controlling votes on the board of directors remained in the hands of structures linked to then-Kremlin-connected businessman Boris Berezovsky. Thanks to this state of affairs, Berezovsky was able to preserve control over the channel's cash flows as well as over its editorial line until 2000.

From 1 April 1995 to late 2002, the channel was called ORT (ОРТ—Общественное Российское Телевидение, Obshchestvennoye Rossiyskoye Televideniye; Public Russian Television). It maintained most of Ostankino Channel One's program lineup, many dating to the Soviet era, such as Vremya, KVN, Chto? Gde? Kogda?, V mire zhivotnykh and Travelers' Club; the last two are no longer broadcast on this channel.

Channel One was the host broadcaster of Eurovision Song Contest 2009, announced in December 2008.

On 8 May 2022, the Office of Foreign Assets Control of the United States Department of the Treasury placed sanctions on Channel One Russia pursuant to Executive Order 14024 for being owned or controlled by, or for having acted or purported to act for or on behalf of, directly or indirectly, the Government of Russia.

In November 2024, the German government ordered the closure of Channel One's local bureau in Berlin and expelled its employees, citing security threats to the European Union and the channel's role in the formation of public opinion.

== Broadcasting ==
The main broadcasting center is in Ostankino Tower, Moscow. In September 2008, the channel installed new digital audio mixing systems in their new state-of-the-art broadcast complex located in the Ostankino Television Technical Centre in Moscow. The new Channel One news facility opened in March 2008 and features advanced server technology with equipment from manufacturers such as Evertz. Channel One began broadcasting a 1080i high-definition signal on 24 December 2012.

At the end of 2018, a separate feed of Channel One's schedule was launched for each of the eleven time zones of Russia. Previously, there had been only five feeds for the entire country—one operating on Moscow Time and variations time-shifted ahead by two, four, six, and eight hours. This caused programming in some time zones to air one hour earlier or later than the time specified in schedules.

Channel One can be streamed on the internet for free on 1tv.ru for viewers in Russia and 1tv.com is for international viewers, though most programs of the Russian version of the channel can be seen internationally too.

== Production ==
Channel One has produced many films, including four of the highest-grossing Russian movies after the Soviet collapse, Night Watch (2004), The Turkish Gambit (2005), Day Watch (2006), and The Irony of Fate 2 (2007). It airs the Russian adaptations of Who Wants to Be a Millionaire?, Survivor, and Star Factory.

=== Original programming ===
- Children's
  - Good Night, Little Ones!
  - Sesame Street
  - Yeralash
  - Courage the Cowardly Dog
- Comedy
  - Big Difference – sketch comedy
  - Calambur – sketch comedy
  - Oba-na – comedy
- Cooking
  - Gusto
- Drama
  - Adjutants of Love – telenovela
  - Azazel – Boris Akunin adaptation
  - Brezhnev – biopic
  - Brief Guide To A Happy Life – romantic drama
  - Catherine the Great – biopic
  - Children of the Arbat – Anatoly Rybakov adaptation
  - The Dark Side of the Moon – detective series
  - The Dawns Here Are Quiet – war
  - Deadly Force – detective series
  - Empire under Attack – history
  - Ex-Wife
  - As the Reels Turn 1: With Friends Like You (Russian: Как вращаются барабаны 1: С такими друзьями, как ты) - comedy and drama series
  - As the Reels Turn 2: The Gamble (Russian: Как вращаются барабаны 2: Игра) - comedy and drama series
  - As the Reels Turn 3: Blinded by Love (Russian: Как вращаются барабаны 3: Ослепленный любовью) - comedy and drama series
  - The Fall of the Empire – history
  - Hot Ice – sports drama
  - House with Lilies – period drama
  - Investigation Held by ZnaToKi – detective series
  - Klim – detective series
  - The Life and Adventures of Mishka Yaponchik – biopic
  - Mata Hari – biopic
  - The Method – detective series
  - Moscow Saga – Vasili Aksyonov adaptation
  - Nine Lives of Nestor Makhno – biopic
  - Pyotr Leschenko. Everything That Was... – biopic
  - Raid – detective series
  - Russian Translation
  - A Second Before... – fantasy
  - Silver Spoon – crime
  - The Sniffer – detective series
  - Spetsnaz – war
  - Streets of Broken Lights – detective series
  - The Thaw
  - The Three Musketeers – Alexandre Dumas adaptation
  - Trace – detective series
  - Trifles of Life – telenovela
  - Trotsky – biopic
  - Wedding Ring – telenovela
  - Yalta-45 – war
  - Yesenin – biopic
- Game shows
  - All or Nothing
  - Field of Wonders
  - The People Versus
  - The Weakest Link
  - What? Where? When?
- Reality shows
  - Star Factory – talent show
  - Last Hero – version of Survivor
  - Let's Get Married (Давай поженимся) – helping people find people they are right for
  - Minute of Fame – talent show
  - One to One! – talent show
  - The Voice – talent show
  - The Voice Kids – talent show
- Sports
  - Lednikoviy period ("Ice Age", Ледниковый период) – ice skating show Ледниковый период – 2
  - Football Review
  - Tennis Review
  - ATP Uncovered
  - WTA All Access
  - WTA One on One with Chris Evert
  - Australian Open
  - Roland Garros
  - Wimbledon Championships
  - US Open
  - Davis Cup
  - Fed Cup
- News and Talk shows
  - Evening Urgant – Ivan Urgant's talk show
  - Good Morning
  - Gordon (Гражданин Гордон / Гордон Кихот) – Alexander Gordon's talk shows
  - Let Them Talk Dmitri Borisov's talk show
  - Pozner (Познер) – Vladimir Pozner's current affairs program
  - Prozhektorperiskhilton – satirical talk show with Ivan Urgant, Garik Martirosyan, Sergei Svetlakov and Alexander Tsekalo
  - Vremya ("Time", Время) – news program, on air since 1968
  - Vremya Pokazhet ("Time Will Tell", Вре́мя пока́жет)
- Other
  - In the World of Animals – zoology
  - Song of the Year – music festival
  - Till 16 and older... – problems of young people
  - Travelers' Club – travel
  - Vzglyad – current affairs

=== International series that were broadcasting on Channel One ===
- American series
  - Lost (Russian: Остаться в живых, Ostat'sya v Zhyvykh, "To Stay Alive" in English)
  - Lie To Me (Russian: Обмани меня, Obmani menya, "Deceive me" in English)
  - Ugly Betty (Russian: Дурнушка, Durnushka, "Ugly girl" in English)
  - FlashForward (Russian: Вспомни, что будет, Vspomni, chto budet, "Remember what will be" in English)
  - Boardwalk Empire (Russian: Подпольная империя, Podpolʹnaya imperiya, "The Underground Empire" in English)
  - Body of Proof (Russian: Следствие по телу, Sledstvie po telu, "The investigation of the body"), the series premiered on 7 February 2011.
  - Suits (Russian: Форс-мажоры, Fors-mazhory, "Force Majeures") premiered on 26 September 2011
  - Terra Nova premiered on 27 September 2011
  - White Collar (Russian: Белый воротничок)
  - Californication (Russian: Калифрения, Califreniya)
  - Ray Donovan (Russian: Рей Донован, Ray Donovan)
  - Bates Motel (Russian: Мотель Бейтс, Motel' Baits)
- Brazilian telenovelas
  - Tropicaliente April – December 1995
  - Mulheres de Areia – 3 January July 1996
  - A Próxima Vítima July 1996 – winter 1997
  - O Rei do Gado 1997–1998
  - Anjo mau 1998
  - Avenida Brasil 2013
- Other
  - Forbrydelsen (Russian: Убийство, Ubiystvo "The Kill") premiered on 28 September 2011
  - Sherlock (Russian: Шерлок Холмс, Sherlock Holmes)

=== Former International and Russian animated series ===
- Nu, Pogodi! (Russian: Ну, Погоди!) 1991–2006
- Looney Tunes and Merrie Melodies
- Alvin and the Chipmunks
- Challenge of the GoBots 1994
- Les Misérables (Russian: Отверженные) 1995
- Widget Autumn – Winter 1995
- Andy Panda 1995–1996 (only in Muftfireworks (Russian: Мультфейерверк))
- Woody Woodpecker (As "Woody and his Friends") 1995 – December 1997 (only in Muftfireworks (Russian: Мультфейерверк))
- Monster Force 22 January – 7 February 1996
- Dog City 1996
- The Legend of Prince Valiant Summer 1996
- Fievel's American Tails Summer 1996 (in Muftfireworks (Russian: Мультфейерверк)), April – May 2002
- Exosquad Autumn 1996
- The Pink Panther 1996–1997 (in Muftfireworks (Russian: Мультфейерверк)), 1998
- Orson & Olivia Winter-Spring 1997
- The Legends of Treasure Island Spring 1997
- The Real Adventures of Jonny Quest 30 October 1997 – 29 October 1998
- Albert - the 5th Musketeer Autumn 1998
- Action Man 9 March – 23 April 1999
- Around the World in 80 days May – July 1999
- Phantom 2040 10 July – September 1999
- Beast Wars 29 November 1999 – 20 January 2000
- Extreme Ghostbusters 23 January – 29 March 2000
- All Dogs Go to Heaven: The Series 13 November 2000 – 2002
- Pororo the Little Penguin Winter 2003 – 18 May 2009
- Fly Tales 12 September 1999 – 2000
- Kaput & Zösky 14 June 2003 – 2004
- Tayo the Little Bus 10 May 2010 – 2019
- Cocomong 2008 – 2015

=== Anime ===
- Maya the Honey Bee (German: Die Biene Maja) 1991 – 1993
- The Flying House 1992 – 1993, 1994
- The Adventures of Tom Sawyer (Japanese: トム・ソーヤーの冒険; Russian: Приключения Тома Сойера) 1994
- Topo Gigio (Japanese: トッポ・ジージョ) 21 November 1994 – 1 February 1995
- Wonder Beat Scramble (Japanese: ワンダービートS) 6 February – 27 March 1995
- Pokémon 18 December 2000 – 3 September 2001
- Yume no Crayon Oukoku 2001 – 2002
- Ojamajo Doremi 2003 – 2006
- Ashita no Nadja 2007

=== Walt Disney Presents ===
- DuckTales 1991, 1992
- Chip 'n Dale Rescue Rangers 1991, 1992
- Disney's Adventures of the Gummi Bears 1992
- TaleSpin 1992

== Editorial independence ==
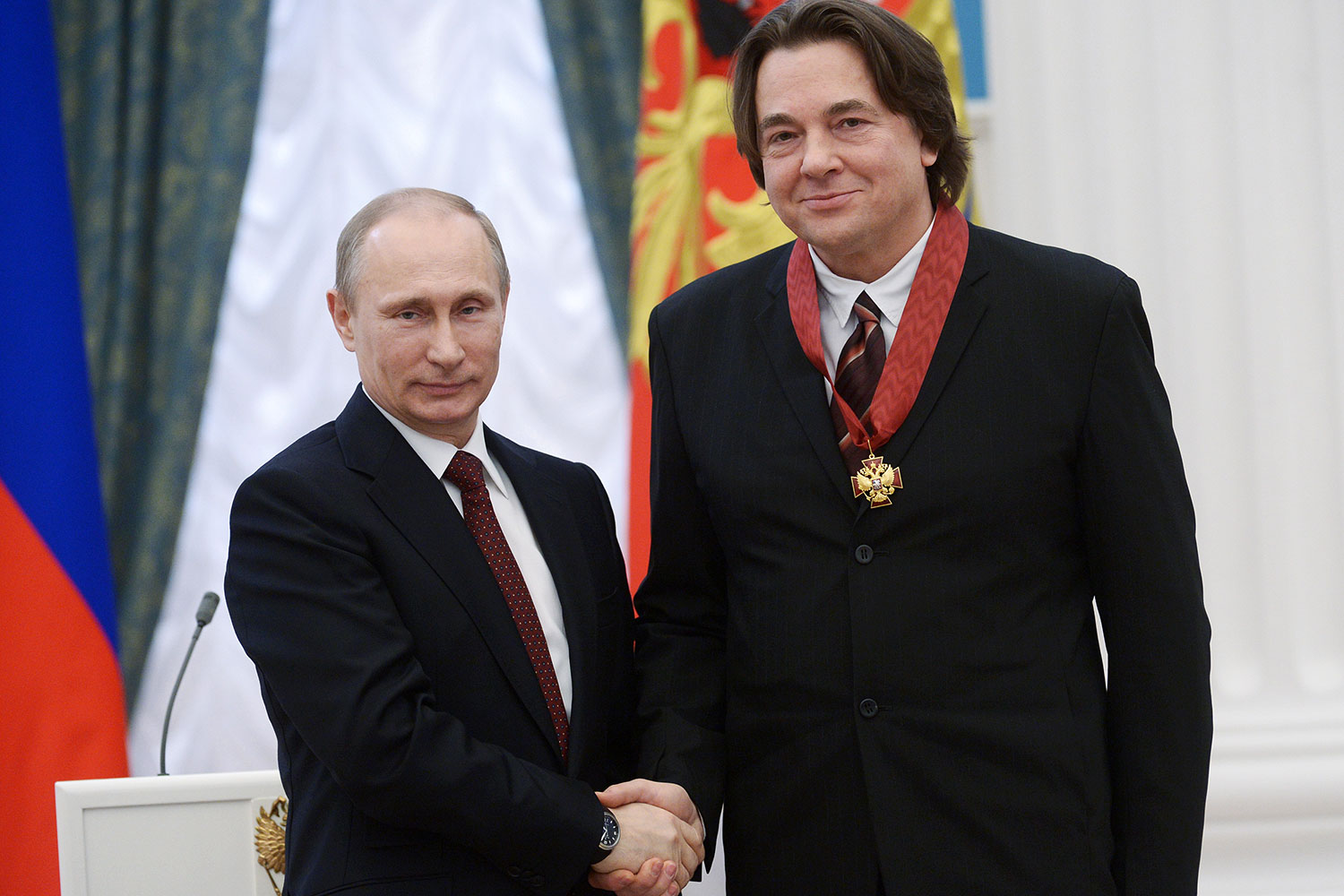
Vladimir Putin and Konstantin Ernst, chief of Channel One

A 2024 study found that throughout Putin's tenure as president or prime minister, Channel One has covered him in a positive light.

=== Political coverage ===
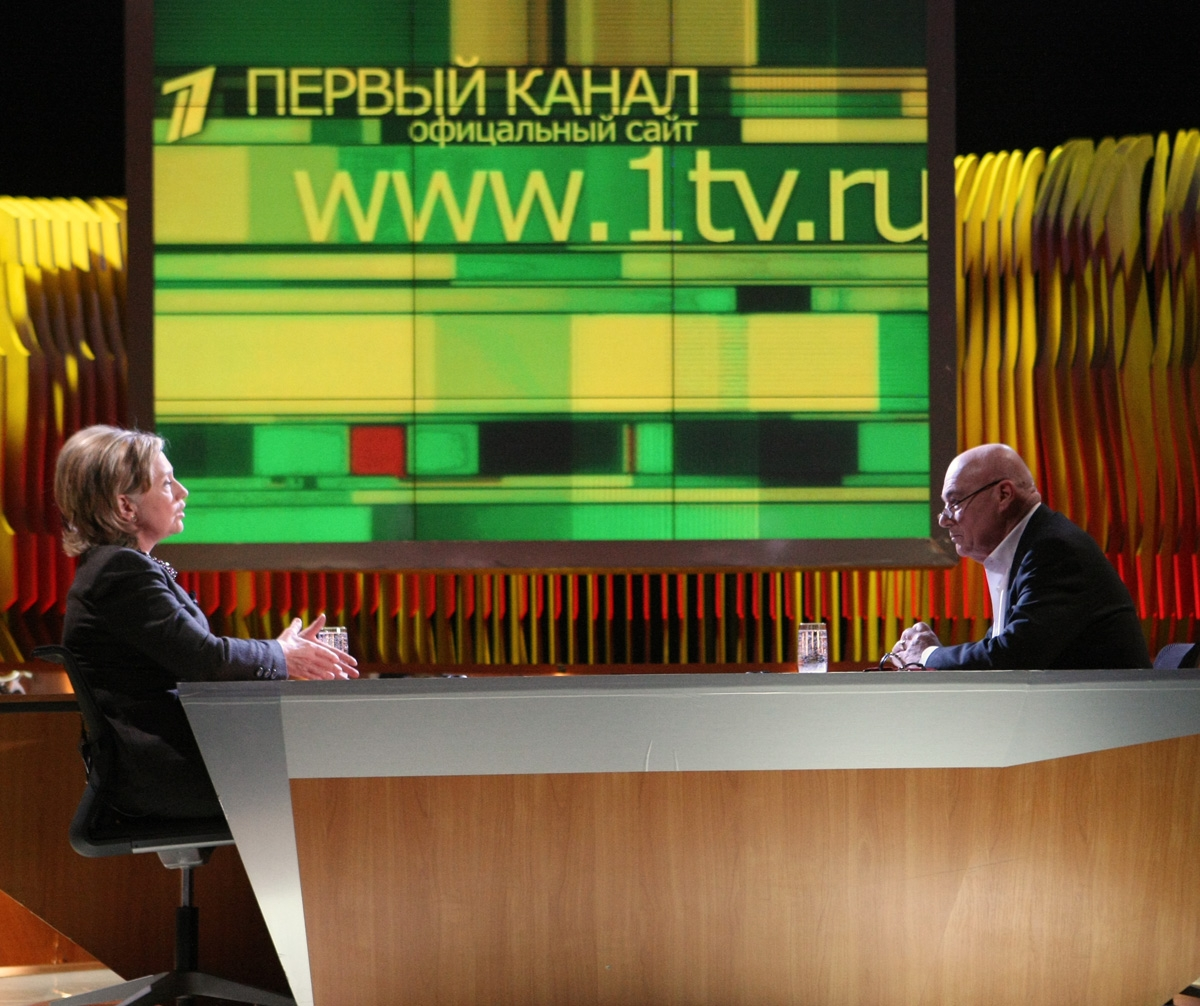
Vladimir Pozner interviews U.S. Secretary of State Hillary Rodham Clinton on the "Pozner Show" in Moscow, 19 March 2010

In autumn of 1999 the channel actively participated in that year's State Duma electoral campaign by criticizing Moscow mayor Yuriy Luzhkov, Yevgeny Primakov and their party Fatherland-All Russia, major opponents of the pro-Putin party Unity. Sergey Dorenko, popularly dubbed as TV-killer, was a close ally of business oligarch and media magnate Boris Berezovsky. From September 1999 to September 2000 he hosted the influential weekly program simply called Sergey Dorenko's Program on Saturdays at 9 pm. This was especially heavy on criticism and mercilessly attacked Putin's opponents.

In August 2000, however, his program criticized how the Putin government handled the explosion of the Russian submarine Kursk. When Dorenko's show was in turn suspended on 9 September 2000, ORT director-general Konstantin Ernst insisted that — contrary to Dorenko's allegations — the government had not been involved in the change. Ernst stated that he yanked the show because Dorenko had defied his orders to stop discussing the government's plan to nationalize Boris Berezovsky's 49-percent stake in the network.

Berezovsky claims that in 2001 he was forced by the Putin administration to sell his shares. He first tried to sell them to a third party, but failed. A close friend of Berezovsky, Nikolai Glushkov, was arrested while seriously ill, and Berezovsky gave up the shares and transferred them to Roman Abramovich's Sibneft with the understanding that Glushkov would then be released. This promise was not fulfilled. Soon after Berezovsky's withdrawal, the new ownership changed the channel's name to Pervy Kanal (Channel One). Konstantin Ernst remains as general director.

== Management and shareholders ==
=== 2005 ===
According to the inspection conducted by the Accounts Chamber of Russia and initiated by MP Alexander Lebedev, in 2005 the channel had the following shareholders structure and board of directors:

- Rosimushchestvo – 38.9%;
- ORT Bank Consortium – 24%;
- RastrKom 2002 – 14%;
- EberLink – 11%;
- ITAR-TASS – 9.1%;
- TTTs – 3%.

Alexey Gromov (Chairman of the Board of Directors, Press Secretary of President Vladimir Putin)
Konstantin Ernst (Director General of the Channel One)
Alexander Dzasokhov (then President of North Ossetia–Alania)
Galina Karelova (Chairman of Russia's Social Insurance Fund)
Mikhail Lesin (Adviser to President Vladimir Putin, former Mass Media Minister)
Nikita Mikhalkov (President of Russia's Cinematographers Union)
Mikhail Piotrovsky (Director of the State Hermitage Museum)
Ilya Reznik (poet, composer)
Alexander Chaikovsky (Chairman of the Composition Department of Moscow Conservatory)
Mikhail Shvydkoi (Chief of the Federal Agency of Culture and Cinematography, former Culture Minister of Russia)

ORT Bank Consortium, RastrKom 2002 and EberLink (49%) are controlled by Roman Abramovich, while Rosimushchestvo, ITAR-TASS and TTTs vote on behalf of the Russian state (51%).

=== 2006 ===
As of 2006, the Board of Directors of the Channel One consisted of:

Sergei Naryshkin (Chairman of the Board of Directors, Minister, Chief of Staff of the Russian Government);
Konstantin Ernst (Director General of the Channel One);
Lyudmila Pridanova (Deputy Head of Rosimushchestvo);
Alexey Gromov (Press Secretary of President Vladimir Putin);
Mikhail Lesin (Adviser to President Vladimir Putin, former Mass Media Minister);
Nikita Mikhalkov (President of Russia's Cinematographers Union);
Mikhail Piotrovsky (Director of the State Hermitage Museum);
Ilya Reznik (poet, composer);
Alexander Chaikovsky (Chairman of the Composition Department of Moscow Conservatory, Rector of Saint Petersburg Conservatory);
Mikhail Shvydkoi (Chief of the Federal Agency of Culture and Cinematography, former Culture Minister of Russia).

=== 2021 ===
In 2021, VTB Bank owned 32.89% of shares.

Vladimir Putin's close friend Yuriy Kovalchuk, through his holding company National Media Group, owns stakes in several of Russia's most influential television channels, including Channel One.

=== 2023 ===
As of 2023, the state owned 34.23% of Channel One, along with a "golden share". VTB Bank controlled 32.89% of the shares, National Media Group owned 19.46%, and Sogaz held a 13.42% stake.

== Sister channels ==
=== Active ===
Channel One owns some digital-only television channels (under brand Channel One Digital TV-family, Цифровое телесемейство Первого канала):

- Dom Kino (Cinema House) — movies
- Dom Kino Premium (Cinema House Premium) — movies
- Muzyka Pervogo (Channel One Music) — music
- Vremya (Time) — 20th century history
- Telecafe (Television Café) — food
- Bobyor (Beaver) — lifestyle
- O! — family
- Poyekhali (Let's Go) — travel
- Karusel (in co-operation with VGTRK) (Carousel) – for children

=== Defunct ===
- Telenyanya (TeleNanny) — for children

== Criticism ==
=== Pro-government bias ===
Critics charge that Channel One's news and information programs are frequently used for propaganda purposes. As Konstantin Ernst stated in his interview to The New Yorker, "it would be strange if a channel that belonged to the state were to express an anti-government point of view". The critics contend that Channel One airs a disproportionate number of stories focusing on positive aspects of official government policy, while largely neglecting certain controversial topics such as war in Chechnya or social problems. In addition, some have argued that the station's news reports often blur the line between factual reporting and editorial commentary, especially when broadcasting stories concerning Russian government policies or goals.

As of 2006, Vladimir Pozner, Ekaterina Andreeva, Pyotr Tolstoy and Mikhail Leontiev are among the most known political journalists of the channel. On Sunday, 28 January 2006, the Channel One news and analytical program Sunday Time (Voskresnoye Vremya) hosted by Petr Tolstoy distorted the content of a speech by Belarusian President Alexander Lukashenko related to the Russia-Belarus energy dispute to the contrary by editing it and deleting some crucial words.

Moreover, various media reported that the channel presented biased coverage of other events that were closely connected to Russia's foreign policy, including the Ukrainian elections to the Verkhovna Rada in 2007, the Euromaidan of 2013–2014, and the following annexation of Crimea. The channel was also criticized for ignoring Alexei Navalny's political activities, namely his participation in the Moscow mayoral election of 2013. Vladimir Pozner, one of the channel's most popular TV hosts, once admitted in an interview to The New Yorker that there is a list of people who are not allowed to participate in his show.

According to a BBC News analysis by Stephen Ennis, the channel has in its reports about Ukraine's war in Donbas "sought to further demonise and dehumanise the Ukrainian army".

Channel One news reports on 16 January 2016 about a 13-year-old girl with German and Russian citizenship in Berlin who was allegedly raped by immigrants was denounced by the German police as fake. German foreign minister Frank-Walter Steinmeier has accused the Russian government of using the alleged rape for "political propaganda".

On 26 February 2018, Channel One used footage from multinational military simulation organization Echelon International, attempting to pass it off as authentic Syrian War footage.

On 14 March 2022, Marina Ovsyannikova, an editor for Channel One, interrupted a live broadcast of Vremya to protest against the Russian invasion of Ukraine, carrying a poster stating in a mix of Russian and English: "Stop the war, don't believe the propaganda, here you are being lied to."

=== Original programming on historical themes ===
Some of the television period dramas produced by Channel One were series criticized for low level of historical accuracy, for instance – Brezhnev, The Saboteur, Yesenin and Trotsky.

=== Cruelty to animals ===
On the morning of 12 January 2008, during the current affairs program Health (Russian: «Здоровье») hosted by Yelena Malysheva covering Guillain–Barré syndrome, a rat was violently killed in one of the segments. Some viewers stated that this was intolerable for a program whose audience includes children, and that it violated the Criminal Code of the Russian Federation. In particular, some claim that viewing such violent and cruel scenes poorly affected the health of some children and people.

== Visual identity ==
Since its replacement on 1 April 1995, the logo features a 1 in various designs.

=== Logo history ===
When ORT began broadcasting, its first logo was a simple "1" block inside a circle outline, but on 1 October 1995, a logo featuring an italic "1" was launched, with the ОРТ typograph. An alternate version of the 1995 logo had blue and white colors.

On 1 January 1997, another logo featuring a golden italic "1" was launched, with a partial ring and the ОРТ letters now in 3 separate blocks, which was designed by Novocom, along with Igor Barbe. On 1 October 2000, the current logo was launched, featuring a "1" with a partial cut, on a dark blue background. The current logo was designed by ORT Design. With the renaming of "ОРТ" to "Channel One Russia" on 2 September 2002, the idents were changed to match the new network's name; however, the 2000 logo is still used.

1 April - 30 September 1995

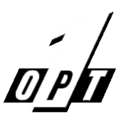
1 October 1995 - 31 December 1996

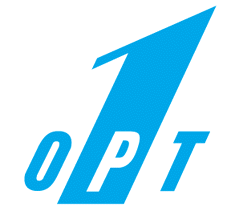
Alternate version of the 1995 logo

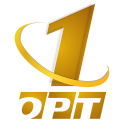
1 January 1997 - 30 September 2000

30 September/1 October 2000 – present

== See also ==
- Channel One Worldwide
- Channel One Cup (football)
- Channel One Cup (ice hockey)
- Eastern Bloc information dissemination

== Sources ==
- Beumers, Birgit; Hutchings, Stephen; Rulyova, Natalia, eds. (26 November 2008). The Post-Soviet Russian Media: Conflicting Signals. Routledge. ISBN 978-1-134-11239-5.
- Burton, Cathie; Drake, Alun (2004). Hitting the Headlines in Europe: A Country-by-country Guide to Effective Media Relations. Kogan Page Publishers. ISBN 978-0-7494-4226-2.
- Noam, Eli M. (2016). Who Owns the World's Media?: Media Concentration and Ownership Around the World. Oxford University Press. ISBN 978-0-19-998723-8.
