= Peretz (Russian TV channel) =

Russian federal TV channel

- Country: Russia

Programming
- Language: Russian
- Picture format: SECAM 576i (4:3 SDTV)

Ownership
- Owner: CTC Media, Modern Times Group and National Media Group

History
- Launched: 7 June 1999; 27 years ago
- Closed: November 12, 2015; 11 years ago

Links
- Website: https://peretz.ru/ (redirected to https://chetv.ru/)

Peretz (Russian: Перец, lit. 'pepper'; formerly known as Darial TV, DTV, and ДТВ) was a Russian national television channel, broadcasting original entertainment programs, as well as Russian and Western television shows.

The channel began broadcasting on June 7, 1999, under the name "Дарьял ТВ". In 2002, it was rebranded as DTV-Viasat, and in 2007, as ДТВ. In 2011, the channel finally took its ultimate name, Перец. By 2011, the channel had a technical penetration of 72.5% and broadcast in over 400 cities across Russia.

In 2015, ceased broadcasting due to the launch of a new channel, Че (телеканал). There were plans to relaunch the channel on satellite and cable networks, but broadcasting never resumed.

== History ==
Pepper was launched on July 7, 1999, as Дарьял ТВ. The channel was planned from the start to be family-friendly, without pornography, sex or violence. Prior to Viasat's acquisition, it primarily aired reruns of existing shows and films from the Soviet era, with virtually no new TV programs.

In 2001, Natalia Daryalova and her father Arkady Vainer sold the channel to Modern Times Group. Following the sale, the channel's name was eventually changed to DTV-Viasat, and its concept, logo, and name were updated. At the same time, the channel’s founder, Arkady Vainer criticized the new owners for firing creative teams and turning a formerly family-friendly channel into one featuring "vulgar films promoting violence" and superfluous sex.

In 2002, the channel had difficulty renewing its broadcast license, due to the actions of previous owners. Authorities also cited issues with advertising of alcoholic beverages and failure to broadcast on several frequencies specified in the license. Due to these violations, the broadcasting frequency was twice put up for auction in November 2002, an action later declared invalid. The channel eventually managed to renew its broadcasting rights for five years.

On February 1, 2003, the network introduced the concept of "seven thematic channels in one" to cater to a wider audience. According to this concept, each day of the week was dedicated to a specific genre.

In 2007, the channel's name changed from DTV-Viasat to ДТВ. The rebranding using Cyrillic lettering aimed to appeal to the Russian audience, which, according to recent studies, had growing confidence in domestic brands. Around this time, its programming changed to consist primarily of criminal shows and documentaries. Consequently, the channel began identifying ДТВ as an abbreviation for Detective Television. This orientation continued until the 2010–2011 season.

Since 2008, the channel was owned by CTC Media. On October 17, 2011, DTV underwent a large-scale rebranding, changing its name to Перец and completely altering the channel's concept. The channel's new CEO was Dmitry Troitsky, who had previously worked at STS and TNT. He aimed to modernise the channel "the first lighthearted channel for adults who still have a spark in their hearts."

On November 12, 2015, the channel was scheduled to cease broadcasting and transfer its frequencies to the new channel Che. The decision was made due to declining target audience ratings and revenue, as well as changes in legislation. However, the plans were adjusted, and, while Che took over its over-the-air broadcasting frequencies, Peretz was expected to continue operating on cable and satellite networks. However, to date, broadcasting has not yet resumed.

Peretz International continues to broadcast outside of Russia.

== See also ==
- CTC
- CarambaTV.ru
- +100500
- Че (телеканал)
