= Ilya Stewart =

Russian film producer

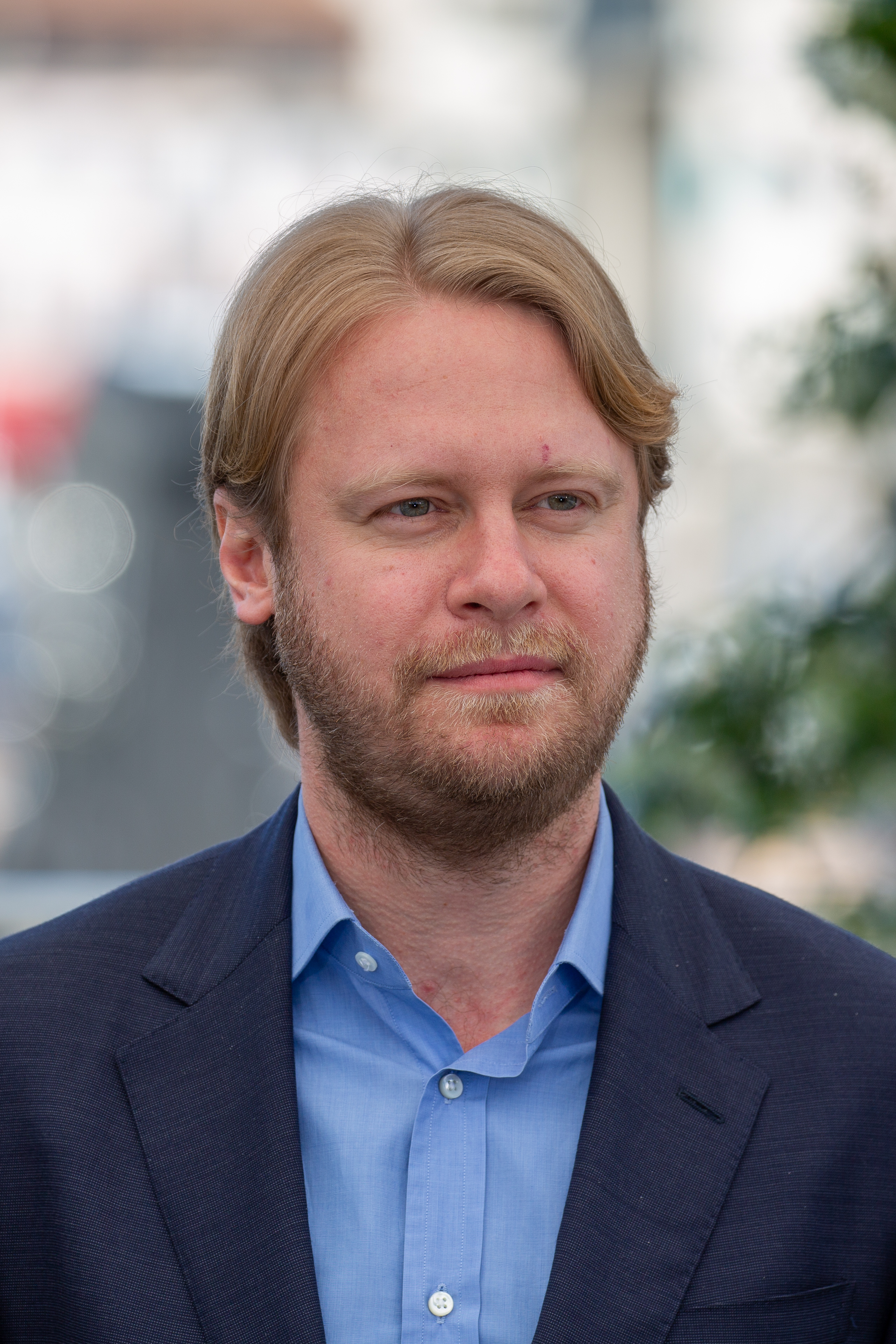
- Stewart in 2025
- Born: Ilya David Stewart; October 4, 1987 (age 39); Moscow, U.S.
- Education: Institut auf dem Rosenberg; Goldsmiths, University of London
- Occupation: Film producer
- Years active: 2014–present
- Spouse: Svetlana Ustinova
- Children: 1

Ilya Stewart (born October 4, 1987) is a Russian film producer. He is the founder of Hype Studios. Stewart is known for his work on internationally recognized films and for collaborations with director Kirill Serebrennikov.

== Early life and education ==
Stewart was born in 1987 in Russia. He is the son of Ella Stewart, chairman of the board of directors of the advertising company BBDO. He graduated from Institut auf dem Rosenberg in Switzerland before attending Goldsmiths, University of London.

== Career ==
Stewart began his career in advertising before co-founding Hype Production in 2011 with Murad Osmann. The company initially focused on commercials and music videos, working with emerging directors and building their careers across different media formats. Stewart began his career in advertising before co-founding Hype Production in 2011 with Murad Osmann. The company initially focused on commercials and music videos, working with emerging directors and building their careers across different media formats. Stewart stated that Hype's production model was centered on long-term collaborations with directors across advertising, music videos, film and television. Stewart also described the company's approach as "director-driven" and emphasized its focus on debut films and emerging talent, launching the careers of many emerging filmmakers..

In the mid-2010s, Stewart gained international recognition through collaborations with Kirill Serebrennikov, including The Student, which premiered at the Un Certain Regard Award at the Cannes Film Festival, and Leto, which premiered in competition at the Cannes Film Festival.

Stewart developed Leto before bringing the script to Kirill Serebrennikov, who directed the film while under house arrest in Russia. According to a 2022 The New York Times report, Stewart arranged for the film's sets to be rebuilt near Serebrennikov's neighborhood so the director could visit during his court-approved evening walks, while flash drives containing footage were slipped beneath Serebrennikov's door so he could review takes and provide notes remotely. During the film's premiere at the 2018 Cannes Film Festival, Serebrennikov was absent due to his detention, and an empty seat was left symbolically for the director as the film received a standing ovation. At the festival press conference, Stewart described the director's arrest during production as "ridiculous", and thanked Cannes and international critics for their support.

In 2018, Stewart was named among "Producers to Watch" by Variety, and he was recognized as Best Young Producer at the VI National Film Festival of Debuts "Movement."

In 2020, Stewart produced Persian Lessons, a World War II drama directed by Vadim Perelman. The film was an international co-production involving companies from Russia, Germany and Belarus, and premiered at the 70th Berlin International Film Festival. In the same year, he served as a producer on Sputnik, a science fiction thriller directed by Egor Abramenko, which premiered at the Tribeca Film Festival. He also served as an executive producer on The World to Come, directed by Mona Fastvold and starring Vanessa Kirby, Katherine Waterston and Casey Affleck, which premiered at the Venice Film Festival in 2020.

In 2021, Stewart produced Petrov's Flu, a film directed by Kirill Serebrennikov, which was selected to compete for the Palme d'Or at the Cannes Film Festival. The project marked a continued collaboration between Stewart and Serebrennikov, following their earlier films The Student and Leto. Serebrennikov, who was banned from leaving Russia at the time, was unable to attend the premiere in person and instead addressed the Cannes audience via FaceTime following the screening. During the premiere, the cast and producers wore red badges bearing the director's image, while an empty seat was symbolically reserved for him inside the theater.

In early 2022, it was announced that Stewart and his company Hype Film would produce a feature film by director Małgorzata Szumowska based on Andrew D. Kaufman's book The Gambler Wife. In the same year, Stewart served as a producer on Tchaikovsky's Wife, directed by Kirill Serebrennikov, which was selected to compete at the Cannes Film Festival. The film marked their fourth collaboration following The Student, Leto, and Petrov's Flu.

In August 2022, Stewart founded Hype Studios, an independent European production company focused on English-language film and television. Through the company, he expanded his work with international partners and developed projects for global audiences. Early productions and projects on its slate included Sanctuary, directed by Zachary Wigon, and Scarlet, directed by Pietro Marcello, as well as two collaborations with Kirill Serebrennikov: Limonov: The Ballad of Eddie, produced with Wildside and Chapter 2 and co-produced by Pathé; and The Disappearance of Josef Mengele, developed with CG Cinéma.

Stewart served as a producer on Scarlet, which opened the Directors' Fortnight section at the 2022 Cannes Film Festival. He also produced Sanctuary, starring Margaret Qualley and Christopher Abbott, which premiered at the 2022 Toronto International Film Festival. The film was subsequently acquired for U.S. distribution by Neon.

In early 2024, Stewart produced Limonov: The Ballad, directed by Kirill Serebrennikov and starring Ben Whishaw, which was selected to compete at the Cannes Film Festival. In June 2024, it was announced that Stewart would produce The Revolution According to Kamo alongside Mike Goodridge. Directed by Kornél Mundruczó from a screenplay by Paweł Pawlikowski, Ben Hopkins and Kata Wéber, the Georgian-language historical drama explores the early life of Joseph Stalin through the perspective of his childhood friend Kamo. Stewart and Goodridge described the project as "an ambitious and chilling story" with contemporary political parallels.

In 2025, Stewart produced The Disappearance of Josef Mengele, directed by Kirill Serebrennikov, which premiered in the Cannes Premiere section at the Cannes Film Festival on May 20, 2025. The project was originally brought to him by French producer Charles Gillibert, with Stewart producing through Hype Studios.

Later in 2025, the previously announced adaptation of Andrew D. Kaufman's The Gambler Wife was revealed under the title The Idiots, directed by Małgorzata Szumowska and Michał Englert, with Aimee Lou Wood, Johnny Flynn, Vicky Krieps and Christian Friedel announced as the cast. Stewart produced through Hype Studios alongside Gold Rush Pictures.

== Industry perspective ==
During the COVID-19 pandemic, Stewart commented on changes in the film industry, noting that government support helped stabilize production and distribution, while reduced competition from international releases created opportunities for domestic films. He stated that the growing importance of streaming platforms offers new opportunities for filmmakers, but that they are likely to coexist with theatrical exhibition as part of a balanced distribution model.

Stewart further stated that although his film The Relatives performed below its potential due to the COVID-19 pandemic, government support and favorable release timing made it commercially viable. He noted that domestic films benefited from reduced competition during this period, but emphasized that international releases remain essential to sustaining cinemas and audience engagement. He also highlighted the importance of theatrical exhibition, particularly for auteur-driven films, which he described as dependent on the cinema experience.

In a 2022 interview with Variety, Stewart stated that private financing has played a key role in the development of contemporary Russian auteur cinema, noting that several internationally recognized films were supported by investors including Roman Abramovich. He also commented on the impact of the Russian invasion of Ukraine on the film industry, stating that distribution was among the sectors most affected due to the withdrawal of international studio releases. Stewart further noted that independent filmmaking has become increasingly difficult amid tighter regulatory conditions and reduced access to financing, while emphasizing the importance of international co-production partnerships in sustaining independent cinema. He suggested that the industry may shift toward more commercially oriented and less politically sensitive content.

During the announcement of Hype Studios in August 2022, it was stated Stewart had relocated his business from Moscow and shifted his focus toward American and European co-productions.

== Filmography ==
Year	Title	Credit	Notes
2016	The Student	Producer	
2016	The Cold Front	Producer	
2017	The Myths	Producer	
2017	Middleground	Producer	
2018	Leto	Producer	
2020	Persian Lessons	Producer	
2020	Sputnik	Producer	
2020	The World to Come	Executive producer	
2021	Petrov's Flu	Producer	
2021	The Relatives	Producer	
2021	The Execution	Producer	
2022	Tchaikovsky's Wife	Producer	
2022	Scarlet	Producer	
2022	Sanctuary	Producer	
2022	Plotnik	Producer	
2022	Vremya goda zima	Producer	
2023	The Owner	Producer	
2023	Rabies	Producer	
2024	Limonov: The Ballad of Eddie	Producer	
2025	The Disappearance of Josef Mengele	Producer	
TBA	The Idiots	Producer	
TBA	Hot Year	Producer	
TBA	Après	Producer	

== Personal life ==
Stewart is married to actress Svetlana Ustinova. The couple began their relationship in 2013, became engaged in 2015, and married in 2017. They have since been based in the United States. In December 2024, they welcomed their first child.
