= Hype Studios =

European Independent Studio

- Industry: Film; Television
- Founded: August 2022; 4 years ago
- Founder: Ilya Stewart
- Website: hypestudios.com

Hype Studios is a European film and television production company founded in 2022 by Ilya Stewart.

== Overview ==
Hype Studios was established in 2022 by Ilya Stewart as a Europe-based production company aimed at expanding his work into international markets. Stewart had previously co-founded Hype Production in 2011 focused on commercials and music videos and later expanded into film production through Hype Film in 2016. Hype Studios was designed to develop and produce English-language projects for global audiences in collaboration with European and American partners. The company's did Sanctuary, directed by Zachary Wigon; Scarlet, directed by Pietro Marcello; and collaborations with Kirill Serebrennikov, including Limonov: The Ballad of Eddie and The Disappearance of Josef Mengele. Additional projects in development included two original English-language projects with Philip Yuryev; and an English-language remake of Sputnik, developed with Egor Abramenko.

In February 2025, Hype Studios entered into a multi-picture financing and co-production agreement with Gold Rush Pictures. The deal covered a slate of at least five feature films, including projects with Małgorzata Szumowska and multiple collaborations with Kirill Serebrennikov, such as The Disappearance of Josef Mengele, alongside additional projects in development in French and English-language production. Also The Revolution According to Kamo, an epic drama about the early life of Joseph Stalin directed by Kornél Mundruczó. In early May, it was announced that Hype Studios would produce Serebrennikov's first French-language feature, Après, starring Ludivine Sagnier, Louis Garrel, Vincent Macaigne, Fanny Ardant, and Guillaume Gallienne. It was further announced that Hype Studios was developing Phantom of the Opera, a contemporary television adaptation produced with Pathé. Later in May, casting was announced for The Idiot(s), the screen adaptation of Andrew D. Kaufman's novel The Gambler Wife, directed by Małgorzata Szumowska and Michał Englert, with Aimee Lou Wood, Johnny Flynn, Vicky Krieps and Christian Friedel among those attached to star.

== Filmography ==
| Year | Title | Director | Notes |
|---|---|---|---|
| 2022 | Scarlet | Pietro Marcello | Cannes premiere; Directors Fortnight section |
| 2022 | Sanctuary | Zachary Wigon | Toronto International Film Festival premiere |
| 2024 | Limonov: The Ballad of Eddie | Kirill Serebrennikov | Cannes premiere; Palm d'Or Nominee |
| 2025 | The Disappearance of Josef Mengele | Kirill Serebrennikov | Cannes premiere; Palm d'Or Nominee |
| 2026 | The Idiot(s) | Małgorzata Szumowska, Michał Englert | Telluride Film Festval premiere |
| TBA | The Revolution According to Kamo | Kornél Mundruczó | |
| TBA | Après | Kirill Serebrennikov | |
