= The Disappearance of Josef Mengele (film) =

2025 historical drama film

- German: Das Verschwinden des Josef Mengele
- Directed by: Kirill Serebrennikov
- Written by: Kirill Serebrennikov
- Based on: The Disappearance of Josef Mengele by Olivier Guez
- Produced by: Mélanie Biessy; Julio Chavezmontes; Christopher Cooper; Charles Gillibert; Abigail Honor; Ilya Stewart; Yan Vizinberg; Felix von Boem
- Starring: August Diehl; Max Bretschneider; David Ruland; Dana Herfurth; Burghart Klaussner; Rodrigo Costa Pereyra
- Cinematography: Vladislav Opelyants
- Edited by: Hansjörg Weißbrich
- Music by: Ilya Demutsky
- Production companies: Hype Studios; CG Cinéma; Lupa Films; Arte France Cinéma; Scala Films; Forma Pro Films
- Distributed by: Bac Films (France); DCM (Germany)
- Release dates: 20 May 2025 (Cannes); 22 October 2026 (France, Germany)
- Running time: 135 minutes
- Countries: France; Germany; United States; United Kingdom; Argentina; Spain; Latvia
- Languages: German; Portuguese; Spanish; Hungarian

The Disappearance of Josef Mengele (German: Das Verschwinden des Josef Mengele) is a 2025 German-language historical drama film written and directed by Kirill Serebrennikov, based on the 2017 non-fiction novel of the same name by Olivier Guez. It stars August Diehl as Nazi SS doctor Josef Mengele, during his escape to South America.

The film had its world premiere at the Cannes Premiere section of the 2025 Cannes Film Festival on 20 May. It was theatrically released in France and Germany on 22 October.

== Premise ==
The film follows Nazi physician Josef Mengele in the years following the end of the Second World War, detailing his later life in Argentina, Paraguay, and Brazil. The film explores his relationships with his second wife Martha and his estranged son Rolf as he justifies his actions at Auschwitz concentration camp.

== Cast ==
- August Diehl as Josef Mengele
- Max Bretschneider as Rolf Mengele
- David Ruland as Hans Sedlemeier
- Dana Herfurth as Irene Schönbein, Josef's first wife
- Friederike Becht as Martha Mengele, Josef's second wife
- Mirco Kreibich as Alois Mengele
- Burghart Klaussner as Karl Mengele
- Károly Hajduk as Nyzli
- Falk Rockstroh as Butler Falk
- Annamária Láng as Gitta Stammer
- Tilo Werner as Geza Stammer
- Rodrigo Costa Pereyra as Roberto Stammer

== Production ==
=== Development ===
In October 2022, it was announced that Russian director Kirill Serebrennikov was planning to make a film based on The Disappearance of Josef Mengele by Olivier Guez, with German actor August Diehl performing the role of Mengele. In 2023, the film was being produced by Charles Gillibert at CG Cinéma and Ilya Stewart at Hype Studios with Gillibert having brought the project to Stewart and the project in development for many years as Serebrennikov was under house arrest in Russia. Also on board the film were Kinology with Felix von Boem at Lupa Films, Arte France Cinéma, Mélanie Biessy with Scala Films, Forma Pro Films and Cimarron coproducing the film with Piano.

The cast includes Max Bretschneider, David Ruland, Dana Herfurth and Burghart Klaussner.

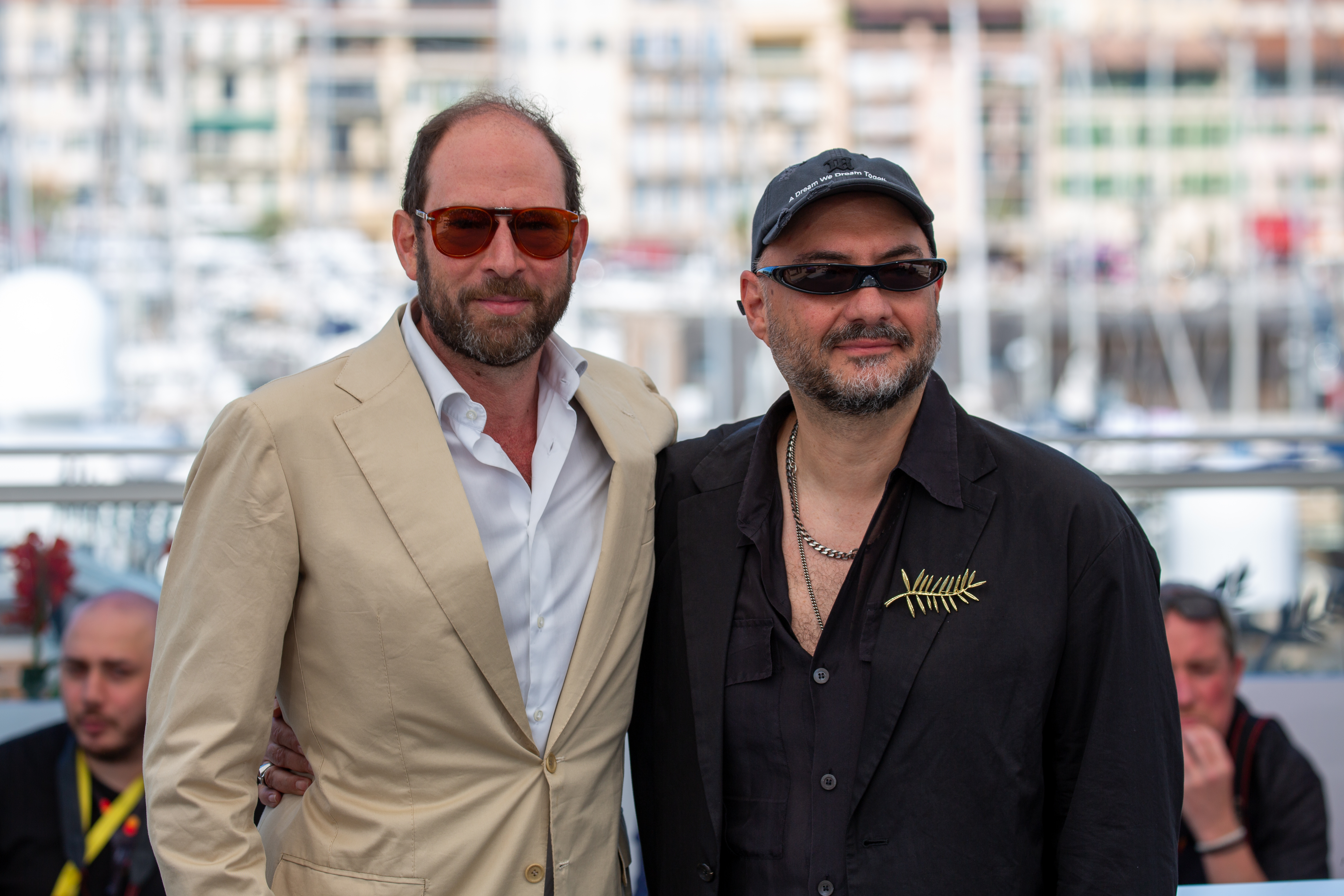
Olivier Guez and Kirill Serebrennikov at the 2025 Cannes Film Festival

=== Filming ===
Principal photography took place in Uruguay and Latvia. It was reported by Variety that filming had been completed by December 2024.

== Release ==
The film had its world premiere at the Cannes Premiere section of the 2025 Cannes Film Festival on 20 May 2025.

== Reception ==
Jordan Mintzer of The Hollywood Reporter described the film as a successful post-war thriller with fantastic direction and camerawork. Siddhant Adlakha for Variety, however, criticized the script as disjointed, needlessly jumping between time periods, losing its core themes in the process.

The decision to include an extended in-color flashback of Mengele employing torture and murder on prisoners at Auschwitz proved controversial. Some critics characterized the sequence as a brutal yet necessary segment for the viewers to understand Mengele's outlook later in life and how he viewed his past crimes. Others were more skeptical of its purpose in the film, characterizing it as an unnecessary showcase of violence that took away from the primary story. The scene's presentation in a home movie style also drew mixed reactions.
