= Aleksandr Kuznetsov (actor) =

Russian-Ukrainian actor

- Александр Кузнецов
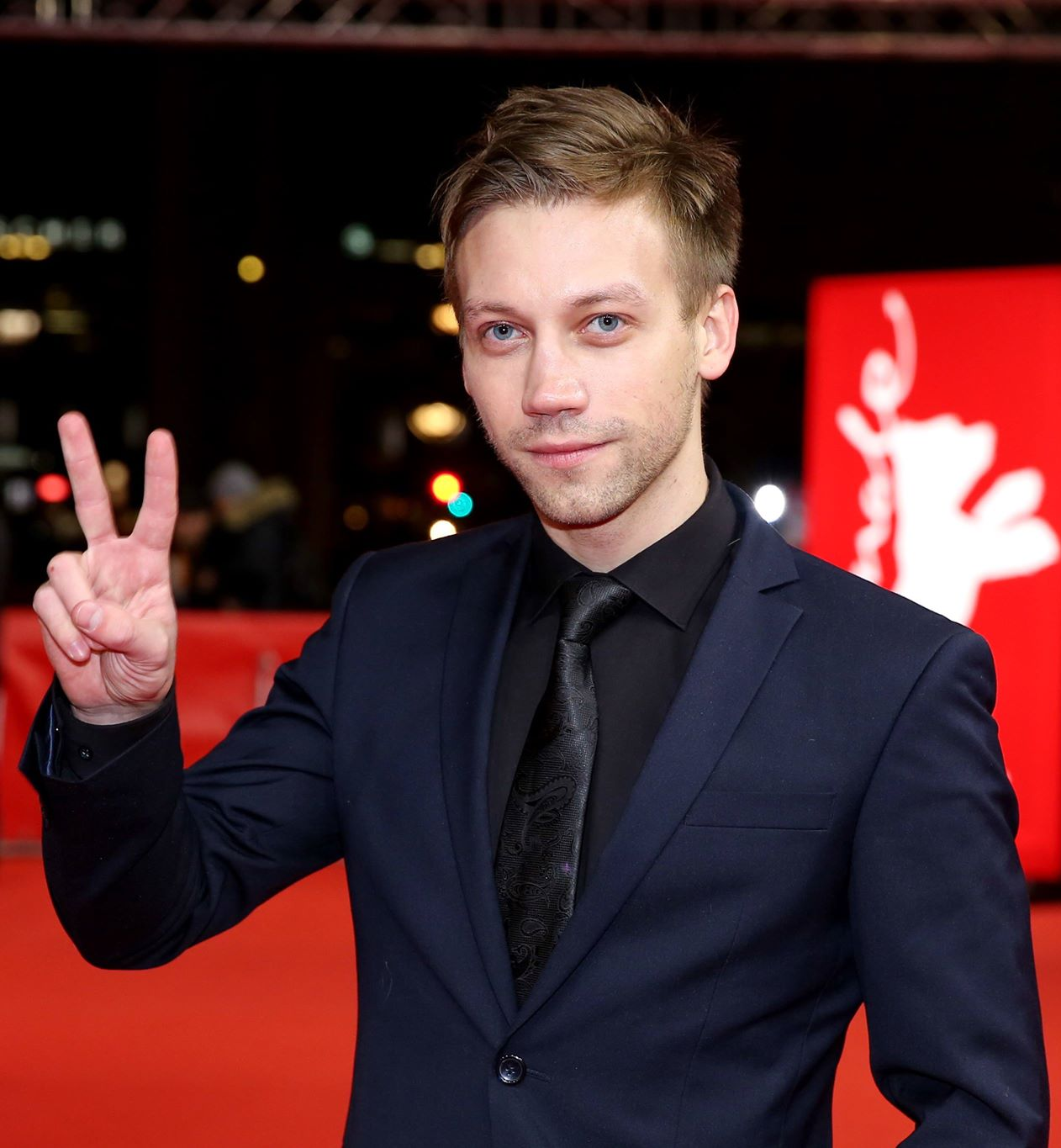
- Aleksandr Kuznetsov attending the premiere of "Acid" at the 69th Berlin Film Festival
- Born: Aleksandr Aleksandrovich Kuznetsov; 22 July 1992 (age 34); Sevastopol, Ukraine
- Citizenship: Russia
- Occupation: Actor
- Years active: 2014–present

Aleksandr Aleksandrovich Kuznetsov (Russian: Александр Александрович Кузнецов, born 22 July 1992) is a Russian actor. He has had prominent roles in Russian films and television.

== Early life ==
Aleksandr Kuznetsov was born on July 22, 1992, in Sevastopol, Ukraine. Kuznetsov felt creatively limited in Sevastopol and moved first to Kyiv and then, in 2011 year he moved to Moscow to pursue his education.

== Career ==
In 2015, he graduated from the Russian Institute of Theatre Arts – GITIS and was invited to join several leading Moscow theaters. He chose the Chekhov Moscow Art Theatre where he started as a leading actor the same year. In addition to film and television, he has performed in numerous theater productions, including "The Rebels" (2017), directed by Aleksandr Molochnikov, and "Oh, late love" (2014), directed by D. Krimov. He also directed and starred in his own production, "The Gamblers (IGQKI)" at the Na Strastnom Theatrical Center (2015).

In television and cinema, Kuznetsov is currently best known for his roles in the Russian Netflix television series Better Than Us, and the films Why Don’t You Just Die? (Papa, sdokhni), directed by Kirill Sokolov, and Leto, directed by Kirill Serebrennikov, which was selected to compete for the Palme d'Or at the 2018 Cannes Film Festival. Considered a fast rising star in Russian Cinema, critics have been mostly positive about his performances. For his leading role in Kislota (ACID) directed by Alexander Gorchilin, Alexander received an Angela Award at the SUBTITLE Spotlight European Film Festival.

In the fall of 2018, Kuznetsov won a "New Names (in Cinema)" Award at the OK! Magazine awards ceremony (Russia).

In 2019, Kuznetsov has been cast in a leading role in Our Men. The French feature film, which will be directed by Rachel Lang, also stars French actor Louis Garrel.

In 2021, Kuznetsov appeared as Krysztof in the HBO Max drama series Kamikaze. Directed by Kaspar Munk, the 8-part series is based on the Norwegian novel, Muleum, by Erlend Loe.

In 2022, Kuznetsov plays the role of Helmut in Fantastic Beasts: The Secrets of Dumbledore directed by David Yates and produced by Steve Kloves.

Aleksandr is represented by Subtitle Talent Agency.

== Personal life ==
Apart from his acting career, Kuznetsov is also the frontman of his band Space Punk Industry. He is currently working on their first album. Aleksandr describes his music as a mix of "britpop and alternative".

Kuznetsov has been vocally critical of the Russian invasion of Ukraine.

== Filmography ==
=== Film ===
| Year | Title | Role | Notes |
|---|---|---|---|
| 2015 | Puppet Syndrome (Sindrom Petrushki) | Young Peter | |
| 2017 | DOGMEAT (Sobachatina) | Brother (Bratik) | Short film |
| 2018 | The Last Warrior (The Scythian) | Marten (Kunitsa) | |
| 2018 | Spitak | Viktor | |
| 2018 | Leto (Summer) | Skeptic | |
| 2018 | Why Don't You Just Die! | Matvey | |
| 2018 | Acid (Kislota) | Peter | |
| 2019 | Mesto! | Konstantin | |
| 2019 | Bratstvo (Leaving Afghanistan) | Laryok | |
| 2019 | Lyubi ikh vsekh | Dima | |
| 2019 | Great poetry (Bolshaya poeziya) | Viktor | |
| 2019 | Groza | Kudryash | |
| 2019 | The kettle (Kotyol) | Sava | |
| 2020 | Our Men | Vlad | |
| 2022 | Heart of Parma | Prince Mikhail | |
| 2022 | Fantastic Beasts: The Secrets of Dumbledore | Helmut | |
| 2022 | Free Fall | Maxim Bortnikov | |
| 2025 | Two Prosecutors | Kornyev | |
| 2025 | Heads of State | Sasha the Killer | |

=== Television ===
| Year | Title | Role | Notes |
|---|---|---|---|
| 2014 | Besy (TV Mini-Series) | Grammar-school boy | Episodes #1.1-1.4 |
| 2018 | Nenastje (Bad Weather) | Jan Suchilin | Episodes #1.1-1.11 |
| 2019 | Better Than Us (Luchshe, chem lyudi) | Bars | |
| 2019 | Gold Diggers | Kirill Somov | |
| 2019 | Be Happy | Psychologist | |
| 2021 | Kamikaze | Krysztof | |

== Awards and nominations ==
| Award | Year | Category | Nominated work | Result |
|---|---|---|---|---|
| Sukhum International Film Festival | 2018 | Best Actor | Dogmeat | Won |
| SUBTITLE Spotlight European Film Festival | 2018 | Best Actor | Acid | Won |
| Chopard Talent Award at Moscow International Film Festival | 2019 | Best Young Actor | Acid | Won |
| Kinotavr | 2019 | Best Actor | Great Poetry | Won |
