= Yuliya Aug =

Russian actress

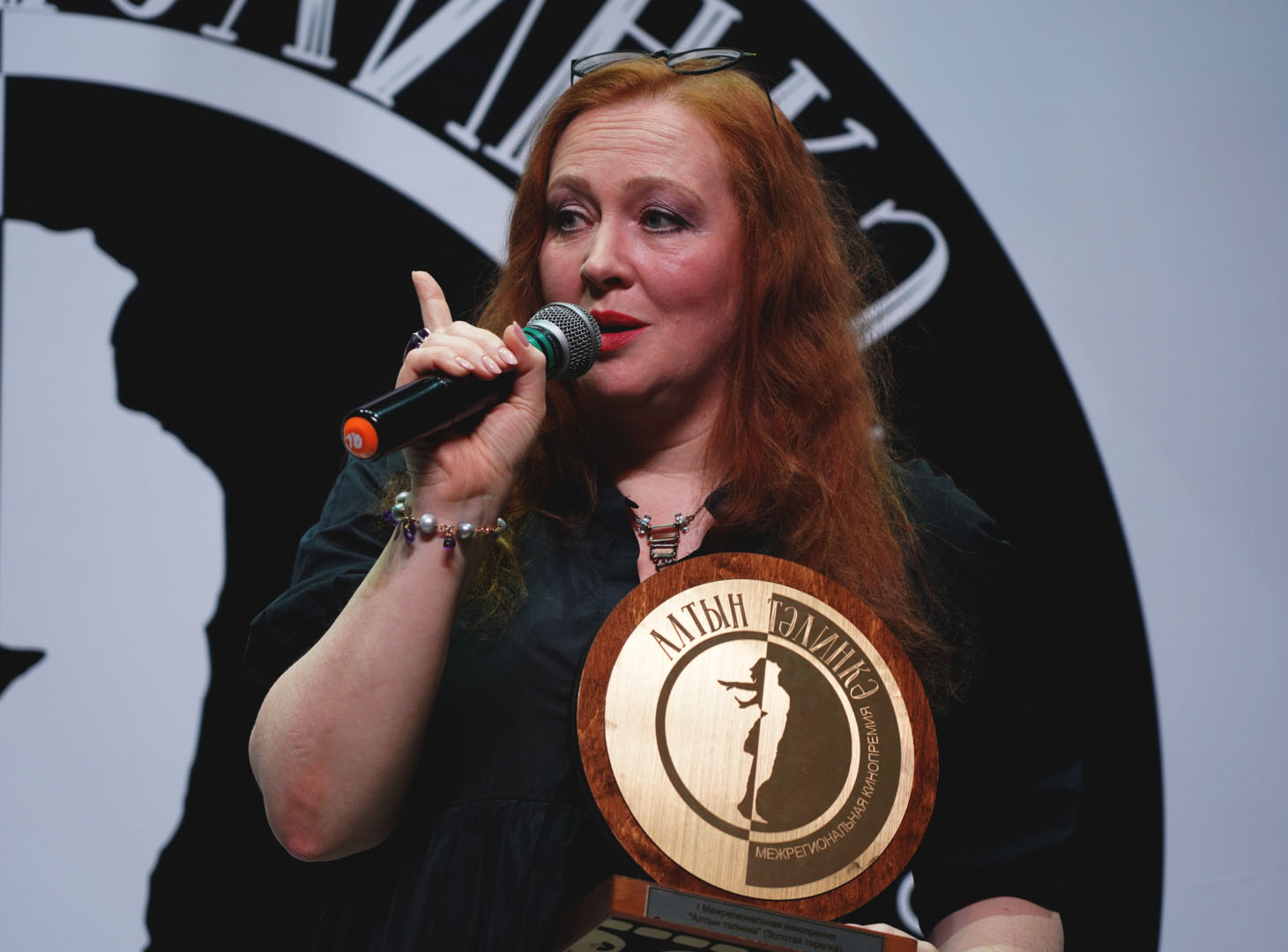
- Born: June 8, 1970 (age 56); Leningrad, USSR
- Occupations: actress, director
- Awards: TEFI, Nika Award

Yuliya Arturovna Aug (Russian: Юлия Артуровна Ауг; Estonian: Julia Aug; born 8 June 1970) is a Soviet and Russian actress, theater and film director, screenwriter, and music video director. Her film credits include The Student, Ekaterina and Leto. Aug is part of the Gogol Center (theater of Kirill Serebrennikov) troupe.

== Early life ==
Aug was born in Leningrad, RSFSR, Soviet Union, and spent her childhood in Narva, Estonian SSR. Her paternal grandfather Oskar Yanovich Aug, was Estonian; on her father’s side, she also has German ancestry, while on her mother’s side, she has Russian and Jewish roots

In 1993, Yulia graduated from the Russian State Institute of Performing Arts and was accepted into the troupe of the Bryantsev Youth Theatre, where she served for ten years, until 2004, playing eight main roles: Sophia in Woe from Wit, Mermaid in Pushkin's Mermaid, Lady Macbeth in Macbeth and others. In 2010 she graduated with honors from the directing department (remote learning) with a degree in Theater Directing of the Russian Institute of Theatre Arts in Moscow (workshop of Joseph Raihelgauz).

== Selected filmography ==
- Abduction of the Wizard (1989) as Anna Mazurkevich
- The White Horse (1993) as Grand Duchess Maria Nikolaevna of Russia
- Streets of Broken Lights (2000) as Marina
- The Master and Margarita (2005) as a woman in the shower
- Silent Souls (2010) as Tanya Kozlova
- Celestial Wives of the Meadow Mari (2012) as Orapti
- Intimate Parts (2013) as Lyudmila Petrovna
- Ekaterina (2014) as Elizabeth of Russia
- The Method (2015) as head of the city
- The Student (2016) as Inga Yuzhina
- Doctor Richter (2018) as Uvarov's mother
- Leto (2018) as Tatiana Ivanova
- The Humorist (2019) as lady with the book
- Passengers (2020) as Lyudmila
- Doctor Liza (2020) as Elena Alexandrovna Zavyalova
- Psycho (2020) as Nadenka
- Petrov's Flu (2021) as janitor
- Compartment No. 6 (2021) as conductor
- Hostel (2021) as Botova
- Container (2021-2023) as Valentina
- Tchaikovsky's Wife (2022) as crazy old woman
- Freeze Dance (2022) as old woman
