= Rabies (2023 film) =

- Directed by: Dmitry Dyachenko
- Written by: Alexey Kazakov
- Produced by: Pavel Burya; Alexey Kazakov; Murad Osmann; Ilya Stewart; Elizaveta Chalenko
- Starring: Aleksei Serebryakov; Vsevolod Volodin; Evgeniy Tkachuk; Georgy Dronov; Anna Ukolova; Kirill Polukhin
- Cinematography: Yuri Nikogosov
- Edited by: Anton Anisimov
- Music by: Dmitry Selipanov
- Production companies: Backup Copy; Hype Film; Cinema Fund
- Distributed by: VLG.FILM
- Release date: February 23, 2023 (Russia)
- Running time: 100 minutes
- Country: Russia
- Language: Russian
- Budget: ₽160 million
- Box office: ₽96.7 million; $1.1 million

Rabies (Russian: Бешенство, romanized: Beshenstvo) is a 2023 Russian thriller film based on the real story of the wild animal rabies outbreak in the Amur Oblast in 2019, the film was directed by Dmitry Dyachenko and written by Alexey Kazakov.

This film was theatrically released on February 23, 2023.

== Plot ==
The film takes place in the Russian taiga, where an outbreak of rabies infects the local wolves, turning the wilderness into a deadly landscape. Igor brings his drug-addicted son, Vovka, to a remote hunting lodge, chaining him to a wall in an effort to isolate him from his habit and get him clean. But as the rabid wolves close in, they face worsening dangers. After a rabid wolf breaks into the cabin, Igor fends it off, and local authorities begin to suspect he is holding his son against his will. As tensions rise, Igor, Vovka, and the police officer Abyzov are forced to flee deeper into the taiga, only to confront a rabid bear at dawn.

In the ensuing struggle, Abyzov and Roman, a forest ranger, are killed. Igor sets the lodge on fire and sacrifices himself to fend off the bear, managing to help his son escape. Vovka, deeply affected, promises to give up drugs for good. In the film’s final scenes, Vovka, now sober, visits his father’s grave with his wife, telling him he has turned his life around and that they are expecting a child.

== Cast ==
- Aleksei Serebryakov as Igor
- Vsevolod Volodin as Vladimir "Vovka", Igor's son
- Evgeniy Tkachuk as a policeman Abyzov
- Georgy Dronov as Yuri "Yura" at the village peasant, Igor's friend
- Anna Ukolova as Olga "Olya" Savchenko
- Kirill Polukhin as a hunter
- Angelina Strechina as Barbara "Varya"
- Aleksandr Ustyugov as Roman, a local gamekeeper
- Ivan Bychkov as "Mishka"
- Aleksandr Bulatov as "Lyoshka"
- Aleksandr Borisov as Major
- Aleksandr Korotkov as an emergency physician
- Irina Zubkova as Vovka's mother

== Production ==
The film was produced by Hype Film and Backup Copy with support from the Cinema Fund. Hype Film was created in 2011 by Murad Osmann and Ilya Stewart, and the director was Dmitry Dyachenko is decided in the harsh range of twilight Russian winter, known for the film trilogy The Last Warrior and the 2023 film Cheburashka. Principal photography began in January 2021 in Moscow and the Altai Republic.

== Release ==
The premiere date in Russia should take place in cinemas around the country from February 23, 2023, by VLG.FILM.
