= Persian Lessons =

2020 Russian-Belarusian war drama film

- Theatrical release poster
- German: Persischstunden
- Directed by: Vadim Perelman
- Written by: Ilya Tsofin
- Produced by: Rauf Atamalibekov; Timur Bekmambetov; Pavel Burya; Murad Osmann; Vadim Perelman; Ilya Stewart; Ilya Tsofin
- Starring: Nahuel Pérez Biscayart Lars Eidinger
- Cinematography: Vladislav Opelyants
- Edited by: Vessela Martschewski
- Production companies: Hype Film; LM Media; ONE TWO Films; Belarusfilm
- Release dates: 22 February 2020 (Berlin); 24 September 2020 (Germany)
- Running time: 127 minutes
- Countries: Russia; Germany; Belarus
- Languages: German; French; Persian

Persian Lessons (German: Persischstunden) is a 2020 historical drama film directed by Vadim Perelman. The film was partially inspired by the short story Erfindung einer Sprache by German writer Wolfgang Kohlhaase.

It was selected as the Belarusian entry for the Best International Feature Film at the 93rd Academy Awards. However, the film was disqualified by the Academy, due to the majority of those involved not coming from Belarus.

== Plot ==
To avoid being shot like the rest of the truckload of Jews travelling through France, Gilles, a Belgian Jew who speaks French and German, tells the German soldiers he is Persian, having acquired a Persian book, despite having no knowledge of the Persian language. They bring him to a nearby concentration camp where Koch, the deputy commandant, asks to be taught the Persian language. Calling himself Reza Joon, Gilles works for Koch in the kitchen, and invents "Persian" words to fool Koch and stay alive.

Koch hopes to learn 2,000 words in two years. He intends to visit Tehran after the war to start a restaurant. Section Leader Max warns Koch that Reza is lying about being Persian.

Koch tests Reza by giving him 40 words to translate, but no pencil. Reza must come to his office later and Koch will write them down. This task seems impossible, so Reza escapes the camp when taking out slop from the kitchen, and encounters a French man in a wood who advises him to return, which he does. Koch orders Reza to neatly copy into a ledger a list of newly arrived prisoners, omitting crossed out names as those died en route. Reza sees a way of using the ledger as a mnemonic to remember the 40 invented "Persian" words, using sections of the names of the dead. This works; he can recite all 40 words without the list, as he still has the ledger in front of him.

Reza is beaten by Koch when he mistakenly gives the same word two different meanings. Reza is sent to hard labour breaking rocks. Reza collapses and recovers in the camp hospital.

Other officers complain of Koch's behaviour and want Elsa, one of the female guards, reinstated as book-keeper. While Reza is sent to labour at a farm, Elsa does the book-keeping. Koch must explain his behaviour to Commandant Beyer. He says he knows who is spreading rumours that the commandant has a small penis. Suspecting Elsa of the small-penis rumours, Beyer sends her to the Russian front.

Reza takes food to a deaf Italian man he saw beaten earlier. The man's grateful brother says he will protect Reza. Max discovers a prisoner who may reveal Reza's deceitfulness, but the Italian brother kills this man, and is in turn killed by Max.

Koch learns that Reza has joined a consignment of prisoners walking to the train station to be conveyed to a death camp. Koch rushes to rescue him. Soon afterward, Commandant Beyer learns that the American Army is approaching, and orders his officers to destroy all records and execute the remaining prisoners. Koch marches Reza on his own out of the camp and Max reports this fact to Beyer, who takes no interest and dismisses Max.

Deep in the surrounding woods, Koch frees Reza, intending to travel alone to Iran. In Tehran, Iranian customs officials do not understand Koch's "Persian" speech and he is arrested.

Escaping to the American lines, Gilles is questioned by officers about the concentration camp. He recites the full names of 2,840 people - the names he memorised from the ledger.

== Cast ==
- Nahuel Pérez Biscayart as Gilles/Reza
- Lars Eidinger as Deputy Commandant Klaus Koch
- Jonas Nay as Section Leader Max Beyer
- David Schütter as Section Leader Paul
- Alexander Beyer as Camp Commandant
- Andreas Hofer as Adjutant von Dewitz
- Luisa-Céline Gaffron as Yana
- Leonie Benesch as Elsa Strumpf
- Giuseppe Schillaci as Marco Rossi
- Pascal Elso as French Policeman

== Production ==
The script of the film was first written in Russian, and then translated into English and eventually German. The fake version of Persian spoken in the film was invented by a Russian philologist at Moscow State University, who based the vocabulary on the real names of documented victims of the Holocaust.

== Release ==
Persian Lessons premiered at the Berlin International Film Festival on 22 February 2020. It was theatrically released in Germany by Alamode Film on 24 September 2020. The film was released in China on 19 March 2021.

== Reception ==
=== Critical response ===
On the review aggregator website Rotten Tomatoes, 80% of 49 critics' reviews are positive, with an average rating of 6.4/10. The website's consensus reads: "Persian Lessons is somewhat dramatically contrived, but it remains an effectively tense drama that's elevated by Nahuel Pérez Biscayart's performance." Metacritic assigned the film a weighted average score of 53 out of 100, based on 7 critics, indicating "mixed or average reviews".

=== Academic response ===
A study done by Grigoriy and Irina Konson in 2023, "On True and Supposed Humanity in Foreign Historical Cinema," provides an argument that states the film misleads the audience by creating a "supposed humanity." Specifically, that the music tries to show a connection between the prisoner and SS officers. The film is trying to find humanity where there is none. Portraying the officer(s) in any form of compassion is dangerous in regard to historical context.

=== Accolades ===
Date	Award	Category	Recipient(s) and nominee(s)	Result	Notes
30 December 2021	34th Golden Rooster Awards (China)	Best Foreign Language Film	Persian Lessons	Nominated	

== See also ==
- List of submissions to the 93rd Academy Awards for Best International Feature Film
- List of Belarusian submissions for the Academy Award for Best International Feature Film
