= Leto (film) =

2018 film

- Film poster
- Directed by: Kirill Serebrennikov
- Written by: Mikhail Idov; Lily Idova; Kirill Serebrennikov
- Produced by: Ilya Stewart; Mikhail Finogenov; Murad Osmann; Charles-Evrard Tchekhoff; Ilya Dzhincharadze; Elizaveta Chalenko
- Starring: Teo Yoo; Roma Zver; Irina Starshenbaum
- Cinematography: Vladislav Opelyants
- Music by: Ilya Demutsky; Roma Zver
- Production companies: Hype Film; Kinovista
- Release dates: 9 May 2018 (Cannes); 7 June 2018 (Russia)
- Running time: 126 minutes
- Countries: Russia; France
- Language: Russian

Leto (Russian: Лето, romanized: Leto, lit. ''Summer'') is a 2018 musical film directed by Kirill Serebrennikov that depicts the Leningrad underground rock scene of the early 1980s. The film draws loosely from the lives of the Soviet rock musicians Viktor Tsoi and Mike Naumenko. It was selected to compete for the Palme d'Or at the 2018 Cannes Film Festival, where it won the Cannes Soundtrack Award. Leto also won the Best Production Designer at the 2018 European Film Awards.

== Plot ==
The film is mainly set in the summer of 1981 in Leningrad. The main storyline of the film tells the story of the relationship between the 19-year-old Viktor Tsoi (Teo Yoo), 26-year-old Mike Naumenko (Roman Bilyk), and Naumenko's girlfriend Natalia (Irina Starshenbaum), as well as the formation of the Leningrad Rock Club and the recording of Kino's first album, 45.

The film's setting, the Leningrad Rock Club, was one of the few state-permitted public performance spaces for rock musicians in its time. The Club is generally a theatrical venue for boundary-pushing music, where audiences are instructed to sit politely and listen rather than mosh. However, interjections by narrator Skeptic (Alexander Kuznetsov) occasionally recast the club as extravagant, hedonistic, reckless, and dangerous. The musicians live frugally; their indulgences are creative rather than material.

Much of the narrative focuses on Mike, the frontman of one of the Club's more popular, old-guard bands, and his girlfriend Natacha, whose close, initially monogamous relationship stands in contrast to the expected behavior of rockstars. Also significant to the plot is Viktor, a quiet, slightly otherworldly young man with a knack for melody and a beguilingly peculiar turn of lyrical phrase. Natacha is the first to notice a kind of melancholic magic about Viktor, as the film gradually reorients itself around his budding stardom rather than Mike's less obviously ascending career. However, the film maintains a more general look at the musicians in the club, including the various musicians who come in and out of the lives of the protagonists.

The film's musical numbers alternate between diegetic stage performances and sudden flights of music-video fancy. In one such performance, an altercation between musicians and more conservative citizens on a packed train escalates into a demented, carriage-traversing singalong of Talking Heads' "Psycho Killer," the hitherto realist imagery disrupted with early-MTV-style cartoon flourishes. There are a few sequences in which Mike and the other Leningrad rockers seize their moment, using their music to defy the bureaucrats and wow audiences. However, nearly all of these scenes all followed by a caveat to the effect of "this didn’t really happen."

== Cast ==
- Teo Yoo as Viktor Tsoi (Kino singer)
- Roman Bilyk (Zveri vocalist) as Mike Naumenko
- Irina Starshenbaum as Natasha Naumenko
- Filipp Avdeyev as Lyosha (prot. Alexei Rybin, first guitarist of Kino)
- Evgeniy Serzin as Oleg (prot. Oleg Valinskiy, first drummer of Kino)
- Alexander Gorchilin as Punk (prot. Andrey «Svin» Panov, frontman of Avtomaticheskie udovletvoriteli)
- Yuliya Aug as Tatyana Ivanova, head of Leningrad Rock Club
- Nikita Yefremov as Bob (prot. Boris Grebenshchikov)
- Georgy Kudrenko as Zhora
- Nikita Yelenev as Virus
- Alexandra Revenko as Mariana's friend I
- Liya Akhedzhakova as apartment owner
- Anton Adasinsky as apartment owner
- Yelena Koreneva as woman in red
- Aleksandr Bashirov as angry man on train
- Seva Novgorodsev as antiquarian
- Vasily Mikhailov as Isha
- Aleksandr Kuznetsov as skeptic
- Andrey Khodorchenkov as Artemy Troitsky

== Production ==
Filming began in July 2017 in St. Petersburg. At the end of August 2017, Serebrennikov was arrested, deported to Moscow on charges of fraud, and placed under house arrest. Nevertheless, by February 2018 he managed to finish the film without violating the prohibitions imposed by the court, as he completed his work using a computer not connected to the Internet. A few unfinished scenes were finished using his notes and based on previous rehearsals. Initial stills from the film were shown in the edition of 2 February 2018 of Variety.

=== Music ===
The film features the music of Kino and other Soviet rock bands. The soundtrack also includes covers of Talking Heads' "Psycho Killer", Iggy Pop's "Passenger", Lou Reed's "Perfect Day", and David Bowie's "All the Young Dudes" by contemporary Russian artists, such as Glintshake and Shortparis. Leto won the Cannes Soundtrack Award.

== Reception ==
=== Critical response ===
Allocine's review aggregator gave the film a score of 4.4 out of 5, with numerous outlets placing the film among the world's top films of 2018.

On the English-language review aggregator Rotten Tomatoes, the film holds an approval rating of 78%, based on 59 reviews with an average rating of 7.3/10. The site's critical consensus reads, "A love story set against the backdrop of a pivotal moment in Russian culture, Leto captures people -- and a generation -- in thrilling flux." Metacritic gives the film a weighted average score of 69 out of 100, based on 17 critics, indicating "generally favorable reviews".

Ben Sachs, the top critic from the Chicago Reader, gave a positive review of the film: "If you can disregard the derivativeness, this has some decent music and charismatic performances, and it provides some insights into the Western aspirations of Soviet youth culture." By contrast, Ty Burr from The Boston Globe stated, "Maybe you had to be there, but it's a movie's job to take us, and this one gets only partway."

Published by the New York Times, Jeannette Catsoulis states, “Kirill Serebrennikov’s gentle mood piece brings an underground music scene to vivid life.”

=== Music community ===
On 15 February 2018, the film was criticized by musician Boris Grebenshchikov, who felt that the script of the film was "a lie from beginning to end."

We lived differently. His scenario is about Moscow hipsters who only know how to do copulate at the expense of others. The script was written by a man from another planet. I think that, in those days, the script writer would have worked for the KGB.

— Boris Grebenschikov

Alexei Rybin, one of the founders of Kino, criticized the script and forbade the use of his image in the film. The film was sharply criticized by the music producer Andrei Tropillo, who described the director Serebrennikov as "a person alien to rock culture and knowing nothing about it". Music critic Artemy Troitsky agreed that the script "causes great doubts", but urged people to wait for the finished film.
