= The Disappearance of Josef Mengele =

2017 French novel about Nazi official Josef Mengele

The Disappearance of Joseph Mengele
- Author: Olivier Guez
- Original title: La disparition de Josef Mengele
- Translator: Georgia de Chamberet
- Language: French
- Genre: historical novel
- Publisher: Grasset
- Publication place: France
- Awards: Prix Renaudot
- ISBN: 9782246855873 French original

The Disappearance of Josef Mengele (French: La disparition de Josef Mengele) is a 2017 French non-fiction novel by Olivier Guez. It details the post-WWII life of Josef Mengele, the "Angel of Death" of Auschwitz, who was infamous for his experiments conducted on Auschwitz prisoners. Released in 2017, it won the Prix Renaudot and became a bestseller: As of 2022, at least 300,000 copies have been sold, and the book has been translated into at least 25 languages.

== Summary ==
Josef Mengele arrives under the pseudonym of “Helmut Gregor” in 1949 in Argentina. He was on the run for 4 years, abandoned by his wife and son, but believes now he can find refuge under Perón, who was friendly to Nazis, as he believed Nazis would help in the war against communist atheism. Mengele does not regret his actions. In fact, he has carried a suitcase of Auschwitz specimens with him, so that he may continue his experiments.

Perón loses power in 1955, and those who fled to Argentina lose protection as they are pursued by Nazi hunters. Adolf Eichmann is caught, brought to Israel, and executed. Mengele goes on the run again, moving to Paraguay, and eventually to Brazil, where he drowns after having a stroke in 1979.

The novel also details the mock trial of Mengele in 1985, where survivors gave their testimony of Mengele.

== Reception ==
The book won the Prix Renaudot in 2017, and was a nominee for the Prix Goncourt. The Spectator wrote a positive review, describing the novel as "compelling reading...This surprising historical novel, highly successful in its shocking impact, should be read as a timely warning of atrocities that barbaric, deranged fanatics commit in war." Publishers Weekly gave a negative review, writing "Journalist Guez makes his English-language debut with a staid portrait of a monstrous man...the narrative is remarkably humdrum and slack."

== Film adaptation ==
In October 2022, it was announced that Russian director Kirill Serebrennikov was planning to make a film based on the book, with German actor August Diehl performing the role of Mengele.
