= Petrov's Flu =

2021 film

- Russian theatrical release poster
- Петровы в гриппе
- Directed by: Kirill Serebrennikov
- Written by: Kirill Serebrennikov
- Based on: The Petrovs In and Around the Flu by Alexey Salnikov
- Produced by: Pavel Burya; Murad Osmann; Ilya Stewart
- Starring: Seymon Serzin; Chulpan Khamatova
- Cinematography: Vladislav Opelyants
- Edited by: Yuriy Karikh
- Production companies: Columbia Pictures; Hype Film; Arte France Cinéma; Logical Pictures; Bord Cadre Films; Charades
- Distributed by: Sony Pictures Production and Releasing (Russia); BAC Films (France); Xenix Filmdistribution (Switzerland); Farbfilm Verleih (Germany); Strand Releasing (United States)
- Release dates: 12 July 2021 (Cannes); 9 September 2021 (Russia); 1 December 2021 (France and Switzerland); 23 September 2022 (United States); 26 January 2023 (Germany)
- Running time: 145 minutes
- Countries: Russia; France; Switzerland; Germany; United States
- Language: Russian
- Box office: $650,482

Petrov's Flu (Russian: Петровы в гриппе, romanized: Petrovy v grippe) is a 2021 drama film written and directed by Kirill Serebrennikov based on Alexey Salnikov's novel The Petrovs In and Around the Flu (Petrovy v grippe i vokrug nego). It was selected to compete for the Palme d'Or at the 2021 Cannes Film Festival where it won the Vulcan Award for cinematography.

== Plot ==
Petrov is an auto mechanic in post-Soviet Yekaterinburg. He is separated from his wife, a librarian, and together they have a son. Just before the start of the new year, his family gets sick with the flu. Then he meets a trickster named Igor who can mix the world of the living and the dead. The Petrov family begin to suffer surrealistic hallucinations and the line between reality and hallucination begins to disappear.

== Cast ==
- Semyon Serzin as Petrov
- Chulpan Khamatova as Nurlinsa Petrova, Petrov's estranged wife
- Vladislav Semiletkov as Petrov's son
- Yuri Kolokolnikov as Igor Artyukhin, Petrov's neighbor and the trickster. His initials in Russian spell out "Hades".
- Ivan Dorn as Sergei, Petrov's friend, and an aspiring writer
- Yuri Borisov as Sasha, Petrov's childhood friend
- Yulia Peresild as Marina, the Snow Maiden from Petrov's childhood memory
- Aleksandr Ilyin as Viktor Mikhailovich, Marina's brother

Additional credited roles were played by Husky, Timofey Tribuntsev and Marina Kleshchyova.

== Production ==
The first plans to make a film based on Salnikov's novel were announced in May 2019, with Serebrennikov helming the project. Serebrennikov wrote the screenplay for the film while under house arrest. Filming began in October 2019, took place in Moscow and Yekaterinburg and was finished in January 2020.

The film was Ivan Dorn's first successful venture into cinema. According to Serebrennikov, "Dorn was a "wonderful dramatic artist" with "an interest in the paradoxical, energy, control of his tools, an ability to exactly recreate the image he wanted to impress on his audience, and a very deliberate approach to art." According to Dorn, he had tried and failed twice to venture into cinema, but Serebrennikov encouraged him to try once more. Dorn also announced that with this film he would conclude his musical career and begin his acting career.

Distribution was provided by Hype Production, and several French, Swiss, German and American production companies participated in the production of the film.

== Reception ==
=== Critical response ===
Petrov's Flu has an approval rating of 84% on review aggregator website Rotten Tomatoes, based on 37 reviews, and an average rating of 7/10. The website's critical consensus states, "A gritty Russian satire with a big, beating heart, Petrov's Flu is highly contagious". It also has a score of 79 out of 100 on Metacritic, based on 18 critics, indicating "generally favorable reviews".

=== Awards and nominations ===
2021 Golden Unicorn Awards: nominated for Best Screenplay, Best Actor, and Best Actress awards.
