= The Idiot(s) =

2026 historical drama film

- Directed by: Małgorzata Szumowska; Michał Englert
- Screenplay by: Kasper Bajon; Brid Arnstein; Michal Englert; Małgorzata Szumowska
- Based on: The Gambler Wife: A True Story of Love, Risk and the Woman Who Saved Dostoyevsky by Andrew D. Kaufman
- Produced by: Lota Dascioraite; Vladimir Zemtsov; Ilya Stewart
- Starring: Aimee Lou Wood; Johnny Flynn; Vicky Krieps; Christian Friedel
- Cinematography: Michał Englert
- Production companies: Gold Rush Pictures; Hype Studios
- Release date: 4 September 2026 (Telluride)
- Running time: 118 minutes
- Countries: Poland; Germany
- Languages: English; German; French

The Idiot(s) is a 2026 drama film directed by Małgorzata Szumowska and Michał Englert, written by Szumowska, Brid Arnstein Michal Englert and Kasper Bajon and based on the novel The Gambler Wife: A True Story of Love, Risk and the Woman Who Saved Dostoyevsky by Andrew D. Kaufman. A co-production of Poland and Germany, it stars Aimee Lou Wood and Johnny Flynn as Anna and Fyodor Dostoyevsky.

The film premiered at the 53rd Telluride Film Festival on 5 September 2026.

== Cast ==
- Aimee Lou Wood as Anna Dostoyevsky
- Johnny Flynn as Fydor Dostoyevsky
- Vicky Krieps
- Christian Friedel
- Barbara Marten
- Rainer Bock

== Production ==
=== Development ===
The project was announced in February 2022 to be entitled The Idiots and directed by Małgorzata Szumowska and Michał Englert, who adapted with Kasper Bajon the novel The Gambler Wife: A True Story of Love, Risk, and the Woman Who Saved Dostoyevsky by Andrew D. Kaufman (2021) which follows the lives of the writer Fyodor Dostoyevsky and his wife Anna Dostoevskaya through the challenging period of writing his novel, The Idiot. Matt Dillon was originally attached to star as Fyodor Dostoevsky before Johnny Flynn replaced him in the role in May 2025, with production by Hype Studios and Gold Rush Pictures and producers Lota Dascioraite, Ilya Stewart and Vladimir Zemtsov. Principal photography was scheduled for June 2025 with Michał Englert as cinematographer and co-director. That month, Barbara Marten, Rainer Bock, Vicky Krieps and Christian Friedel joined the cast.

=== Filming ===
Principal photography started on 16 June 2025 in Poland, with filming locations including Lower Silesia. First-look images from the set were released in July 2025.

== Release ==
The film had its world premiere at the 53rd Telluride Film Festival on 5 September 2026. It was also selected for the Special Presentations section of the 2026 Toronto International Film Festival, where it was screened on 15 September and in October it entered official competition at the 2026 BFI London Film Festival. In November 2026, the film will be screened at PÖFF in Tallinn, Estonia.
