= The Scythian =

- Film poster
- Directed by: Rustam Mosafir
- Written by: Vadim Golovanov; Rustam Mosafir
- Produced by: Sergey Selyanov; Andrei Rydanov
- Starring: Aleksey Faddeev; Aleksandr Kuznetsov; Vitaly Kravchenko; Aleksandr Patsevich; Yuriy Tsurilo; Andrey Permyakov; Vasilisa Izmaylova; Aleksey Ovsyannikov
- Cinematography: Dmitry Karanchik
- Edited by: Andrey Nazarov
- Music by: POTIR
- Production company: CTB Film Company
- Distributed by: Nashe Kino (Our Cinema)
- Release date: January 18, 2018
- Running time: 105 minutes
- Country: Russia
- Language: Russian
- Budget: ₽150 million
- Box office: ₽56.3 million; $1.062.977 (Worldwide); $1.053.002 (Russia/CIS)

The Scythian, also in English territories as The Last Warrior (Russian: Скиф) is a 2018 Russian action drama fantasy film directed by Rustam Mosafir, starring Aleksey Faddeev, Aleksandr Kuznetsov and Vitaly Kravchenko. It takes place in the 11th century in Kievan Rus', during a time in which grandiose changes are taking place in Eurasia. Once proud warriors, the Scythians have degenerated into vile mercenaries, raiding the civilian population. During one of these raids, warrior Lutobor's wife and child are abducted. However, the hero does not intend to resign himself to fate, and pursues the Scythians in an attempt to save his family. As a guide, he takes the captive Scythian Marten (Kuznetsov) and, despite the huge differences between them, they must work together to survive their journey.

The film was released on January 18, 2018. in Philippines and Vietnam.

== Plot ==
These are times when one civilization is replacing another. A new era is about to begin in Central Eurasia.

The Scythians, once proud warriors, are all but gone. Their few descendants have become ruthless mercenary assassins, the "Wolves of Ares." Lutobor, is a soldier with a difficult task at hand. He becomes involved in internecine conflicts and sets off on a perilous journey to save his family. His guide is a captive Scythian by the name of Marten. Lutobor and Marten are enemies. They pray to different gods but must embark on this journey together. They brave the wild steppes, moving toward the last haven of the Scythians, to what seems to be their inevitable demise.

== Cast ==
- Aleksey Faddeev as Lutobor
- Aleksandr Kuznetsov as Marten / Kunitsa
- Vitaly Kravchenko as Yar
- Aleksandr Patsevich as Vseslav
- Yuriy Tsurilo as Oleg, Prince of Tmutarakan
- Andrey Permyakov as Wolf Ares
- Vasilisa Izmaylova as Tatyana, wife of Lutobor
- Aleksey Ovsyannikov as Luchezar
- di. Rustam Mosafir as Kumai
- Viktor Solovyov as Anagast
- Saido Kurbanov as Gonczak
- Elena Solomina as Midwife
- Aleksey Ingelevich as Priest of Berendeyev
- Boris Zverev as Berenday
- Oleg Rudenko-Travin as Guard of Perun
- Aleksandr Samoylov as Troyan
- Sergey Tsepov as Merchant Gojko
- Andrey Fomin (actor) as Prova
- Vyacheslav Yurovskikh as Scythian
- Fyodor Roshchin as Episode
- Mikhail Gagarin as Episode

== Production ==
=== Filming ===
Filming took place in the Republic of Crimea in autumn 2016. They filmed near Kerch, as well as near Yevpatoriya and Yalta.
