= Limonov: The Ballad =

2024 film by Kirill Serebrennikov

- Italian theatrical release poster
- Directed by: Kirill Serebrennikov
- Screenplay by: Ben Hopkins; Paweł Pawlikowski; Kirill Serebrennikov
- Based on: Limonov by Emmanuel Carrère
- Produced by: Ilya Stewart; Ardavan Safaee; Dimitri Rassam; Mario Gianani; Lorenzo Gangarossa
- Starring: Ben Whishaw
- Cinematography: Roman Vasyanov
- Edited by: Yurii Karikh
- Music by: Massimo Pupillo
- Production companies: Wildside; Chapter 2; Fremantle Spain; France 3 Cinéma; Hype Studio
- Distributed by: Pathé (France); Vision Distribution (Italy); Filmin (Spain)
- Release dates: 19 May 2024 (Cannes); 5 September 2024 (Italy); 4 December 2024 (France); 21 February 2025 (Spain)
- Running time: 138 minutes
- Countries: France; Italy; Spain
- Language: English
- Budget: €17.5 million
- Box office: $400,000

Limonov: The Ballad is a 2024 biographical film directed by Kirill Serebrennikov, co-written by Ben Hopkins, Paweł Pawlikowski and Serebrennikov. It is based on Emmanuel Carrère's 2011 book Limonov, a novelized biography of the Russian dissident writer and politician Eduard Limonov, who founded the National Bolshevik Party. It stars Ben Whishaw in the titular role alongside Viktoria Miroshnichenko, Tomas Arana, Corrado Invernizzi, Evgeniy Mironov, Andrey Burkovskiy and Odin Biron.

The film was selected to compete for the Palme d'Or at the 77th Cannes Film Festival, where it premiered on 19 May 2024. Vision Distribution released the film in Italy on 5 September 2024.

== Cast ==
- Ben Whishaw as Eddie
- Viktoria Miroshnichenko as Elena
- Tomas Arana as Stephen
- Corrado Invernizzi as Lonya
- Evgeniy Mironov as Kuznetsov
- Andrey Burkovskiy as Poet
- Maria Mashkova as Anna
- Odin Biron as Ethan
- Vadim Stepanov as Model
- Vlad Tsenev as Waiter
- Sandrine Bonnaire as Radio Interviewer
- Céline Sallette as Intellectual
- Louis-Do de Lencquesaing as Intellectual
- Ivan Ivashkin as poet
- Donald Sumpter as Eddie's father

== Production ==
In 2017, Paweł Pawlikowski adapted Emmanuel Carrère's biographical novel Limonov (2011), based on the life of Eduard Limonov, into a screenplay. Pawlikowski planned to direct the film adaptation but revealed in 2020 that he lost interest in the character and abandoned plans to direct.

== Release ==
Limonov: The Ballad was selected to compete for the Palme d'Or at the 2024 Cannes Film Festival, where it had its world premiere on 19 May 2024. It was released in Italy on 5 September 2024 by Vision Distribution. Pathé released the film in France on 4 December 2024. It was released in Spain on 21 February 2025 by Filmin.

== Reception ==
=== Critical response ===
On Rotten Tomatoes, the film holds an approval rating of 63% based on 27 reviews, with an average rating of 6.2/10.The website's critical consensus states: "Limonov: The Ballad rides Ben Whishaw's electrifying performance through a seductive haze of countercultural cool, capturing the self-mythologizing chaos of its antihero while remaining too enamored to fully interrogate him." On Metacritic, the film has a weighted average score of 61 out of 100 based on 9 critic reviews, indicating "generally favorable" reviews.

=== Accolades ===
| Award | Date of ceremony | Category | Recipient(s) | Result | Ref. |
|---|---|---|---|---|---|
| Cannes Film Festival | 25 May 2024 | Palme d'Or | Kirill Serebrennikov | Nominated | |
