= Spitak (film) =

2018 film

- Film poster
- Directed by: Alexander Kott
- Written by: Marina Sochinskaya
- Starring: Aleksandr Kuznetsov
- Release date: April 2018 (Russia)
- Running time: 88 minutes
- Country: Armenia
- Language: Armenian

Spitak is a 2018 Armenian drama film directed by Alexander Kott. It was selected as the Armenian entry for the Best Foreign Language Film at the 91st Academy Awards, but it was not nominated.

== Cast ==
- Aleksandr Kuznetsov as Viktor
- Olivier Pagès as Jerome
- Oleg Vasilkov as Sergey

== See also ==
- List of submissions to the 91st Academy Awards for Best Foreign Language Film
- List of Armenian submissions for the Academy Award for Best Foreign Language Film
