= Olivier Guez =

French writer and journalist (born 1974)

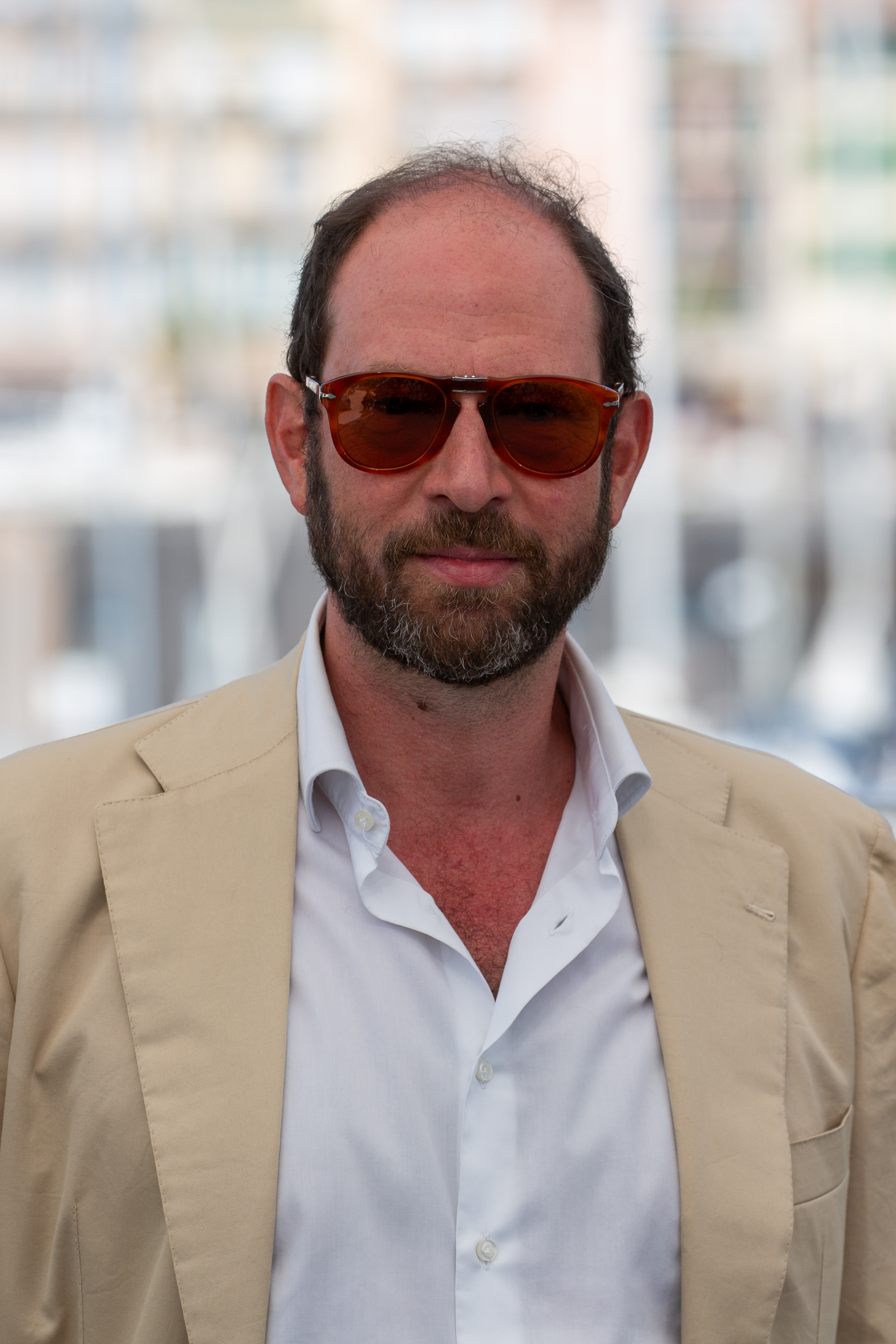
- Guez in 2025
- Born: 15 June 1974 (age 52); Strasbourg, France
- Education: Institut d'études politiques de Strasbourg; London School of Economics (LSE); College of Europe
- Occupations: Writer, journalist
- Known for: Winner of the 2017 Prix Renaudot

Olivier Guez (French pronunciation: [ɔlivje ɡɛz]; born 15 June 1974) is a French journalist, essayist and writer. He won the 2017 Prix Renaudot for his novel The Disappearance of Josef Mengele (La disparition de Josef Mengele).

== Life ==
Guez was born and grew up in Strasbourg, France to French doctors. His maternal grandmother introduced him to reading at a very young age.

He studied at Sciences Po Strasbourg, the London School of Economics (LSE) and the College of Europe. He worked as a freelance journalist, for The New York Times, Le Monde, the Frankfurter Allgemeine Zeitung, Le Figaro Magazine, L'Express, Le Point, Politique Internationale, Der Freitag, Der Tages Anzeiger, Das Magazin and Il Foglio.

Between 2000 and 2005, he worked as a reporter in the International Economy Department of La Tribune. He wrote Surveys and reports on Central Europe, Latin America, the Middle East, the European Union, and the geopolitics of oil. He wrote his first book, La Grande Alliance, in collaboration with Frédéric Encel,

In 2017, he wrote a biographical novel The Disappearance of Josef Mengele, (awarded the Prix Renaudot). It documents Josef Mengele (1911–1979), Nazi German SS officer, war criminal who worked as a doctor at Auschwitz. The Disappearance of Josef Mengele was one of eight novels in the second selection for the 2017 Prix Goncourt.

In 2024, he wrote another biographical novel, Mesopotamia, that telles the story of Gertrude Bell, an English spy, explorer and archeologist, who had a major role in the creation of Iraq, in the 20's.

== Works ==
- The Grand Alliance. De la Chechnyaie à l'Irak, un nouvel ordre mondial, with Frédéric Encel, éditions Flammarion, 2003, 304 p. ISBN 2-08-210281-5
- The Impossible Return. Une histoire des Juifs en Allemagne depuis 1945, éditions Flammarion, 2007, 336 p. ISBN 978-2-08-210554-5
- La Chute du mur, with Jean-Marc Gonin, éditions Fayard, 2009, 359 p. ISBN 978-2-213-63312-1
- American Spleen. Un voyage d'Olivier Guez au cœur du déclin américain, éditions Flammarion, coll. « At large », 2012, 270 p. ISBN 978-2-08-126952-1
- Éloge de l'esquive, éditions Flammarion, 2014, 107 p. ISBN 978-2-246-81189-3
- Les Révolutions de Jacques Koskas, éditions Belfond, 2014, 331 p. ISBN 978-2-7144-5792-9
- The Disappearance of Josef Mengele, éditions Grasset, Paris, 2017, 240 p. ISBN 978-2-246-85587-3
- Mesopotamia, éditions Grasset, 2024, 420 p. ISBN 978-2-246-81895-3
