= Alexander Gorchilin =

Russian actor (born 1992)

- Александр Горчилин
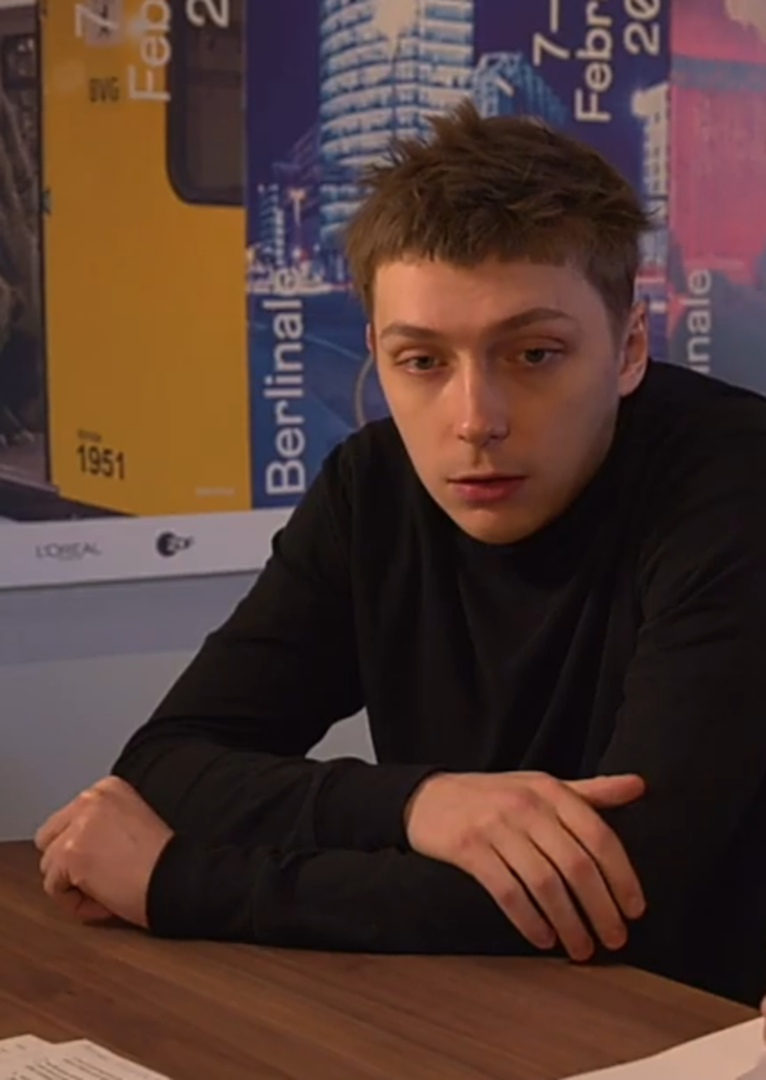
- Interview with Alexander Gorchilin, director of the Acid
- Born: Alexander Pavlovich Gorchilin; March 3, 1992 (age 34); Moscow, Russia
- Education: Gogol Center
- Occupations: Actor; Voice actor; Film director
- Years active: 2007–present

Alexander Pavlovich Gorchilin (Russian: Алекса́ндр Па́влович Горчи́лин; born March 3, 1992) is a Russian film and stage actor, voice actor and film director. Gained fame after playing roles in the TV series Daddy's Daughters and Atlantis (ru). Actor of the Gogol Center Theater. In 2018, he made his debut as a film director, presenting the full-length picture Acid.

== Biography ==
Alexander Gorchilin began acting as a child. He played a role in the musical Nord-Ost and then in commercials and TV-series. In 2012 he graduated from the Moscow Art Theatre School (the course of Kirill Serebrennikov) and joined the troupe of Gogol Center.

== Acting career ==
He continued his film career, among his most notable roles are Antonin in Yes and yes by Valeriya Gai Germanika, Grigoriy Zaytsev in The Student, and Punk in Leto by Kirill Serebrennikov.

In 2018 Gorchilin made his debut as a filmmaker with his first feature film Acid. He received a "Debut" prize at the 29th Kinotavr film festival.

== Filmography ==
=== Film ===
List of film credits
Year	Title	Role	Notes
2008	Twice in the same river	Olezhka	
2012	Teacher's Day	son	
2014	Yes and Yes	Antonin	(ru)
2016	The Student	Grigoriy Zaytsev	
2016	Zoology	Stylist	
2016	City Birds		
2017	Blockbuster	Artemiy	(ru)
2018	Leto (English: Summer)	Punk	
	Icaria	Filipp	
2020	Has Anyone Seen My Girl?	Sergei	
2021	Mama, I'm Home	Nazarov	
2022	Tchaikovsky's Wife	Anatoliy Brandukov	
2023	Clipmakers	Gregory "Grisha" Vizantysky	

=== Television ===
List of television credits
Year	Title	Role	Notes
2007-2013	Daddy's Daughters	Zhenya Zaharov	
2007-2008	Atlantis	Maxim Andreev	(ru)
2009	Sea Patrol 2	Kostya	(ru)
2017	Law of the Stone Jungle	Vanya	(ru)
2019	Hanna	Arvo	
2021	Happy End	Max	

=== As director ===
- Acid (2018)

== Dubbing roles ==
- Phineas Flynn (Phineas and Ferb)
- Ferb Fletcher (Phineas and Ferb)
- Jackson Stewart (Hannah Montana)
