= Acid (2018 film) =

2018 film directed by Alexander Gorchilin

- Directed by: Alexander Gorchilin
- Produced by: Sabina Eremeeva; Natella Krapivina
- Starring: Filipp Avdeyev; Aleksandr Kuznetsov; Aleksandra Rebenok
- Cinematography: Ksenia Sereda
- Edited by: Vadim Krasnitsky
- Production companies: Elephant Film Studio; TRUEMEN Pictures
- Release date: 4 October 2018
- Running time: 98 min.
- Country: Russia
- Language: Russian

Acid (Russian: Кислота, romanized: Kislota) is a 2018 Russian drama film directed by Alexander Gorchilin. In June 2018, the film participated in the Kinotavr film festival debut competition, where Gorchilin was awarded the prize for best film. The film premiered in Russia on 4 October 2018 and in Berlin, Germany on 8 February 2019.

== Plot ==
Sasha (Filipp Avdeev) and Petya (Aleksandr Kuznetsov) live the crazy life of young musicians in modern-day Moscow: loud parties, ups and downs, the wheel of unstable relationships with others and themselves. Knowing the importance of love, family, and opportunity, but feeling lonely and disconnected, has left them both with a sense that they are corroding from the inside. Suddenly an event occurs in their lives that requires them both to take an honest look at themselves.

== Cast ==
- Filipp Avdeyev as Sasha
- Aleksandr Kuznetsov as Petya
- Aleksandra Rebenok as Sasha's mother
- Anastasia Yevgrafova as Lyubochka
- Yevgenia Sheveleva as Girl
- Pyotr Skvortsov as Ivan
- Daniela Stojanovic as the Ivan's mother

== Awards and nominations ==
- Kinotavr — Best Debut (Alexander Gorchilin): won
- 2018 SUBTITLE Spotlight European Film Festival — Angela Award for role as Petya (Aleksandr Kuznetsov): won
- Russian Guild of Film Critics — Best Supporting Actress (Aleksandra Rebenok), Best Debut (Aleksandr Gorchilin, Sabina Eremeeva, Natella Krapivina): nominated
- GoEast Film Festival — Golden Lilly for Best Film (Alexander Gorchilin, Sabina Eremeeva, Natella Krapivina)
