= The Heart Machine =

- Theatrical release poster
- Directed by: Zachary Wigon
- Screenplay by: Zachary Wigon
- Based on: Someone Else's Heart by Zachary Wigon
- Produced by: Lucas Joaquin; Alex Scharfman; Jordan Lewis
- Starring: John Gallagher, Jr.; Kate Lyn Sheil; David Call; Louisa Krause; Roderick Hill; Halley Wegryn-Gross; Libby Woodbridge
- Cinematography: Rob Leitzell
- Edited by: Louise Ford; Ron Dulin
- Music by: Christopher White
- Production companies: Parts and Labor
- Distributed by: FilmBuff
- Release date: March 8, 2014 (SXSW)
- Running time: 85 minutes
- Country: United States
- Language: English

The Heart Machine is a 2014 romantic thriller film written and directed by Zachary Wigon in his feature directorial debut. The film is based Wigon's 2012 short film Someone Else's Heart. The film is about a man (played by John Gallagher Jr.) who attempts to track down the woman (played by Kate Lyn Sheil) with whom he has been in an online-only relationship, as he suspects that she has lied to him about key details of her life. The film was released in a limited release on October 24, 2014, by Filmbuff.

== Plot ==
After they meet on a dating site, Cody and Virginia begin chatting with each other over Skype and subsequently start a long-distance relationship. Virginia tells Cody that although she lives in Germany, she plans to return to the New York City area in six months, and they make plans to meet. As they grow emotionally closer, Cody experiences second thoughts when a series of details seem to contradict Virginia's story, such as the sirens of emergency vehicles that sound North American. Cody becomes very confused when he sees what he believes to be Virginia on a New York City subway train. He does not approach her, but in his next Skype chat with her, he says he spotted her doppelgänger.

Virginia is revealed to be living in New York City and using social networking apps to meet people for casual sex. Cody, who uses aural cues in their Skype chats to track down likely locations, begins to visit places she has mentioned. In a bar, he meets a man who recognizes her face but does not know her. After listening to Cody's story, he says that Virginia is likely messing with him, and he directs Cody to a cafe that Virginia frequents. There, Cody meets a barista that matches the profile of someone Virginia said she once dated. Later, Cody ingratiates himself into the barista's house, where he attempts to casually inquire about Virginia. When the man becomes suspicious of his motives, Cody excuses himself and leaves.

Cody further investigates Virginia's life and studies her pictures on Facebook to find out who her friends are. When he discovers one of them is going to a venue, he waits until she arrives and then joins the line. After making small talk with her, they end up at her apartment and begin to make out. Cody stops and asks her questions about Virginia, which confuses her. After he checks her phone and computer for evidence that she knows Virginia, she angrily orders him to leave. Cody uses Craigslist's missed connections feature to meet with another of Virginia's friends. Later, he locates the apartment complex in which she lives, and when he finds evidence of food that she has eaten on Skype in the building's trash, he stops accepting her calls.

Virginia realizes that she can not keep the illusion up any longer, and they finally meet face-to-face. Virginia explains that she has had many failed relationships that began very well, and she wanted to find some way to make this one work. Thinking that if they could never meet in person that it might preserve the relationship, she impulsively lied when he asked to meet her in their first Skype conversation. Cody silently listens to her explanation, then tells her that the relationship was a mistake. The film ends as he walks away.

== Cast ==
- John Gallagher, Jr. as Cody
- Kate Lyn Sheil as Virginia
- David Call as Dale
- Louisa Krause as Jessica
- Roderick Hill as Brett
- Halley Wegryn-Gross as Sarah
- Libby Woodbridge as Caitlyn

== Production ==
The initial idea came to Wigon after one of his relationships ended. Although the relationship had gone well while it temporarily transitioned to Skype, it ended once they reunited and Wigon realized that they had drifted apart. This experience inspired Wigon to imagine a character who prefers Skype-based relationships. Wigon wrote the film when he was going through a period of loneliness and feeling isolated. The script was designed to focus on these everyday issues for two people: one who uses the Internet to escape, and another who descends into obsession. One of the themes of the film is how convenience comes at a price, such as how Wigon feels technological convenience can cause the loss of a human aspect in Internet-based relationships. The film is not meant to be a criticism of technology itself but an exploration of how technology facilitates compartmentalization, such as different apps that can compartmentalize the various aspects of a relationship. Gallagher said it was "a very nonjudgmental story of people doing some very questionable things". Sheil said that, as two shy people, the characters depended on technology as a buffer in order to open up to each other; however, it also made it easier for them to be self-destructive in their relationship. Sheil was worried that her character could be an object of obsession for Gallagher's character, but she and Wigon worked to make sure that Virginia was more fleshed-out.

Shooting took place in New York City over 18 days. For the scenes in which the actor conversed using Skype, the actors were put in different rooms of the same house and filmed their conversations using the application. Due to Internet outages and software failures, they had to reshoot several scenes. The actors rehearsed their scenes face-to-face prior to shooting to develop a sense of intimacy. Wigon estimated 10–15% of the film was improvised, and he encouraged the actors to improvise during the Skype conversations. In order to illustrate Virginia's deception, the set design was deliberate, as Wigon wanted to ensure that it showed she was attempting to hide her location. Wigon used slow, 360 degree pan shots in order to build tension. He said that he wanted to build as much tension and paranoid anxiety as possible, so as to make it seem as though Cody may be in danger of losing his mind from the ordeal. Wigon also wanted avoid what he called generic sitcom shots that reveal nothing about the scene. Wigon, a film critic for The Village Voice among other publications, said that his filmmaking helped inform his criticism more than the reverse; while editing the film, he said he developed a greater understanding of narrative construction. Influences included The Conversation, Simon Killer, and Eyes Wide Shut.

== Release ==
After a crowdfunding campaign to finance its distribution, The Heart Machine premiered at SXSW on March 8, 2014. It was theatrically released on October 24, 2014.

== Reception ==
Rotten Tomatoes, a review aggregator, reports that 95% of 20 surveyed critics gave the film a positive review; the average rating is 7/10. Metacritic rated it 72/100 based on nine reviews. Andrew Barker of Variety wrote, "Kate Lyn Sheil and John Gallagher Jr. give excellent performances in Zachary Wigon's impressive debut." John DeFore of The Hollywood Reporter called it "a thoughtful, emotionally tricky debut benefiting from two strong lead performances". Nicolas Rapold of The New York Times wrote that it "neatly expresses anxieties about love" in a modern context, but "it doesn’t entirely deliver on its promising buildup". Shelley Farmer of Indiewire rated it "B" and wrote, "While Wigon's film lacks emotional weight, that deficiency is not a matter of style over substance, but an effective comment on the peculiarly isolating nature of modern communication technology." Sheila O'Malley of The Dissolve rated it 3.5/5 stars and wrote, "Except for its ending, which deflates the tension and makes a brief gesture toward profundity, it’s an unblinking look at one man's total unraveling." Neha Aziz of The Austin Chronicle wrote that it "has a deeply compelling storyline and solid performances", but Virginia's back story is lackluster. Calum Marsh of The Village Voice wrote, "What results is an exemplary mystery, a paranoid thriller rooted in contemporary technology but not crafted to denounce it." Tomas Hachard of NPR wrote that the film's deliberate pacing "is central to making The Heart Machine such an unsettling love story". Jenni Miller of The A.V. Club wrote, "The Heart Machine’s denouement is ultimately disappointing, but the film is still one of the more successful cinematic portrayals of online intimacy." Jennifer Chang of Under the Radar rated it 3/10 stars and wrote, "Despite Gallagher and Sheil’s acting finesse, an hour and half is simply too long to spend with self-absorbed characters as they sum up all the unpleasantness of online dating."

Details listed it as a must-see Netflix film for March 2015.
