= Leaving Afghanistan =

Film directed by Pavel Lungin

Battle of Afghanistan
- Russian theatrical release poster
- Братство
- Directed by: Pavel Lungin
- Written by: Aleksandr Lungin; Pavel Lungin
- Produced by: Pavel Lungin; Evgeniy Panfilov
- Starring: Mikhail Kremer; Aleksandr Kuznetsov; Kirill Pirogov; Yan Tsapnik
- Cinematography: Igor Grinyakin
- Production company: Pavel Lungin Studio
- Distributed by: Walt Disney Studios Sony Pictures Releasing CIS
- Release date: May 10, 2019
- Country: Russia
- Language: Russian

Leaving Afghanistan (Russian: Братство, romanized: Bratstvo lit. brotherhood) is a 2019 Russian war film directed and written by Pavel Lungin.

== Plot ==
The story is set in 1988–1989, during the final phase of the Soviet-Afghan War. Based on real events, it follows soldiers of the 108th Motor Rifle Division, whose withdrawal from Afghanistan is put on hold to rescue the kidnapped son of a Soviet general by the Mujahideen as a result of a plane crash, fighting their way through the Salang Pass and experiencing the hardship of war along the way.

== Cast ==
- Mikhail Kremer
- Aleksandr Kuznetsov
- Kirill Pirogov
- Yan Tsapnik

== Reception ==
=== Controversy ===
The film was criticized by politicians and Soviet Army veterans for being "unpatriotic", among which Federation Council member Igor Morozov noted the film featuring scenes of Soviet soldiers looting and fighting amongst themselves as being unsuitable for "educating young people with a sense of patriotism", accusing director Pavel Lungin of distorting history. Lungin rejected criticism of the film as being "anti-Russian", stating how it is instead an anti-war film that instead shows "how good guys are sent to fight ugly, pointless wars" and how it promotes conversation about the role of Russia’s armed forces during and after the Cold War period.

=== Awards ===
Leaving Afghanistan was entered into the 2019 Shanghai International Film Festival’s Golden Goblet Awards, where writers Aleksandr and Pavel Lungin won the award for Best Screenplay.
