= Limonov (novel) =

2011 biographical novel by Emmanuel Carrère

- Author: Emmanuel Carrère
- Translator: John Lambert
- Language: French
- Publisher: P.O.L.
- Publication date: 2011
- Publication place: France
- English publication date: 2014
- Pages: 488
- ISBN: 978-2-8180-1405-9

Limonov is a 2011 biographical novel by the French writer and journalist Emmanuel Carrère. The book is based on the life of Eduard Limonov, a Russian politician and opposition figure, as well as a poet and novelist.

The book focuses on all aspects of Limonov's life, emphasizing the literary and the political components, while not neglecting ethical issues and the biographer's personal views. In Carrère's book, Limonov emerges as a subtle and loyal figure, prone to occasional violence and excess based on his many frustrations, be it political, creative or emotional. The book is also a historical and sociological approach to 20th century Russia with its leaders and dissidents as it is a complex non-fiction narrative based on the life of a living person.

Carrère's testimony is based on a three-week period the author spent with Limonov in Moscow, after he briefly frequented him in the Paris of the 1980s.

== Film adaptation ==
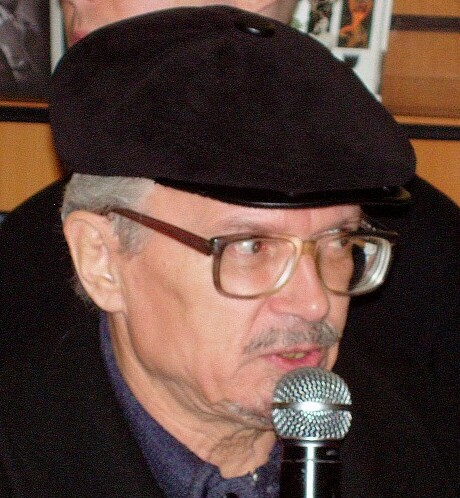
Picture of Eduard Limonov

In December 2017, Variety reported that a film adaptation of the novel was in development by Polish filmmaker Paweł Pawlikowski. Pawlikowski completed a screenplay and was set to direct the film. However, in May 2020, Pawlikowski revealed he lost interest in the character and abandoned plans to direct the film. In 2022 it was announced that the novel will be adapted by Russian filmmaker Kirill Serebrennikov, with Limonov to be played by English actor Ben Whishaw.

== Prizes and awards ==
- 2011 - Prix de la langue française
- 2011 - Prix Renaudot
- 2013 - Europese Literatuurprijs

== See also ==
- 2011 in literature
- Contemporary French literature
