= Frédéric Encel =

French writer and scholar of geopolitics

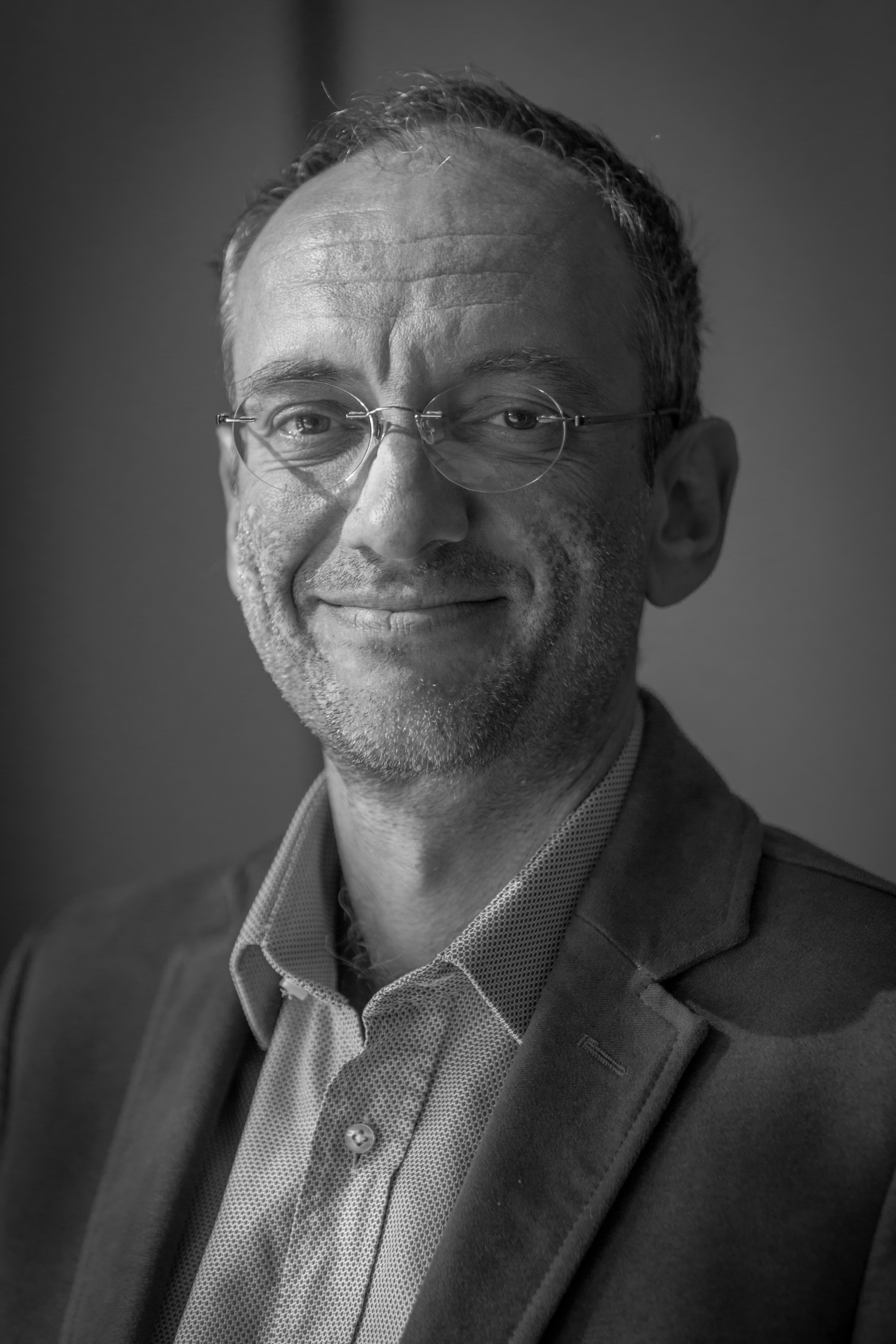
- Born: 4 March 1969 (age 56); Paris, France
- Education: Grenoble Institute of Political Studies; Paris 8 University
- Occupation: Writer

Frédéric Encel (born 4 March 1969) is a French essayist and scholar of geopolitics. He received his DEA in geopolitics from the Centre of Geopolitical Analysis and Research (known in French as the Centre de recherches et d’analyses géopolitiques) at the University of Paris VIII in 1992. He remained there studying under Yves Lacoste and earned his doctorate in geopolitics in 1997. He teaches international relations at the ESG Management School. He frequently points out the Iranian danger in French press.

== Works ==
- Horizons géopolitiques. Seuil. 2009. ISBN 978-2-02-084799-5.
- Atlas géopolitique d'Israël. Aspects d'une démocratie en guerre. Autrement. 2008. ISBN 978-2-7467-1114-3.
- Géopolitique du sionisme. Armand Colin. 2006. ISBN 978-2-200-34542-6.
- Comprendre le Proche-Orient. Une nécessité pour la République. Bréal. 2005. ISBN 978-2-7495-0563-3. (with Eric Keslassy)
- Géopolitique d'Israël. Dictionnaire pour sortir des fantasmes. Seuil. 2004. ISBN 978-2-02-063820-3. (with François Thual)
- La Grande alliance. De la Tchétchénie à l'Irak, un nouvel ordre mondial. Flammarion. 2003. ISBN 978-2-08-210281-0. (with Olivier Guez)
- Géopolitique de l'Apocalypse. La démocratie à l'épreuve de l'islamisme. Flammarion. 2003. ISBN 978-2-08-080066-4.
- L'Art de la guerre par l'exemple. Stratèges et batailles. Flammarion. 2000. ISBN 978-2-08-080035-0.
- Le Moyen-Orient entre guerre et paix. Une Géopolitique du Golan. Flammarion. 1999. ISBN 978-2-08-080012-1.
- Géopolitique de Jérusalem. Flammarion. 1998. ISBN 978-2-08-035573-7. (new edition 2008, ISBN 978-2-08-121303-6)
