= August Diehl =

German actor (born 1976)

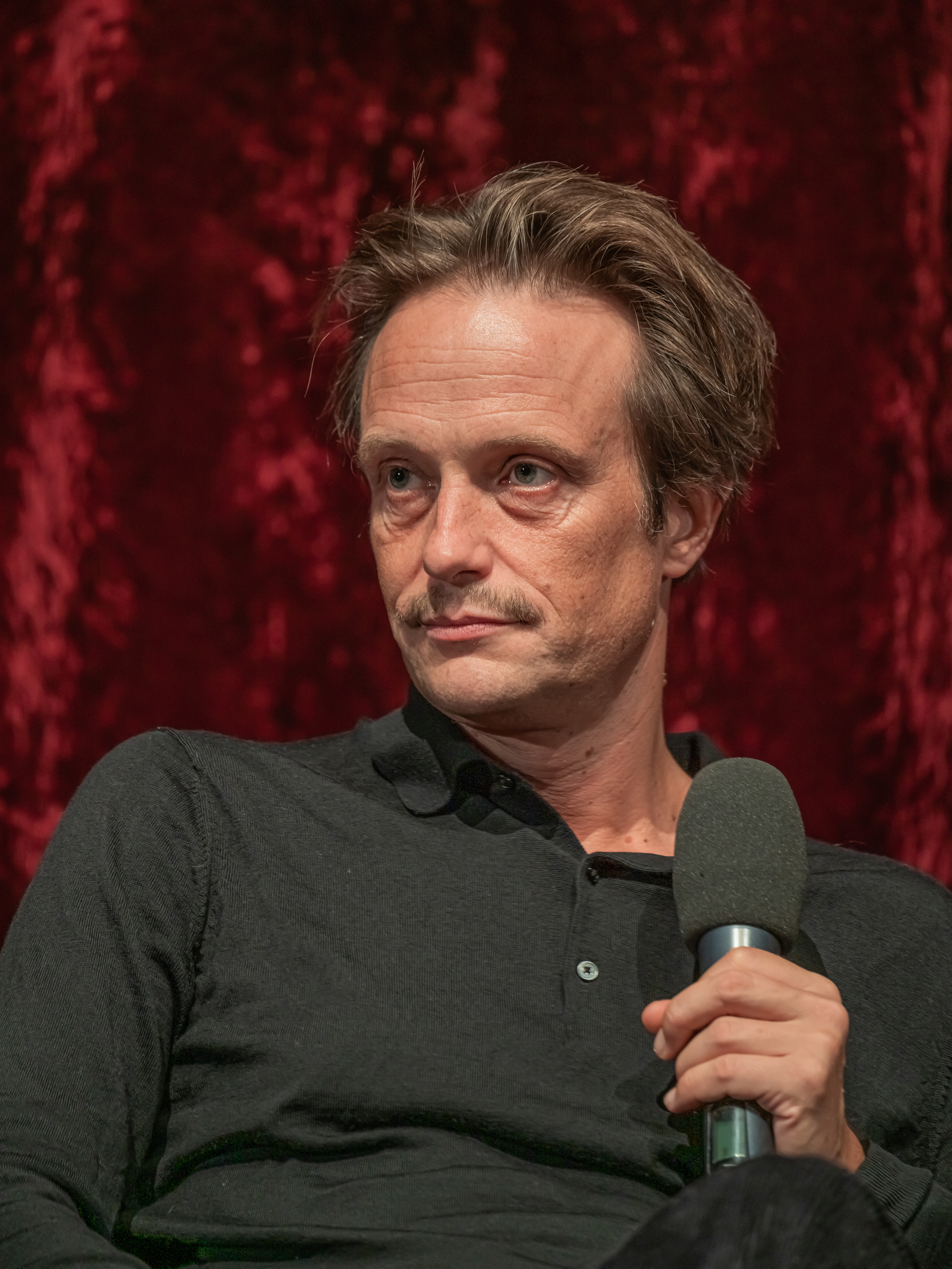
- Diehl in 2024
- Born: 4 January 1976 (age 50); West Berlin, West Germany
- Education: Ernst Busch Academy of Dramatic Arts
- Occupation: Actor
- Years active: 1998–present
- Spouse: Julia Malik (m. 1999; div. 2016)
- Children: 2

August Diehl (German pronunciation: [aʊ̯ˈɡʊst diːl]; born 4 January 1976) is a German actor, primarily known to international audiences for playing Gestapo major Dieter Hellstrom in Quentin Tarantino's Inglourious Basterds (2009) and Michael "Mike" Krause, Evelyn Salt's husband, in the movie Salt. He is also known for his leading roles in the films The Counterfeiters (2007), The Young Karl Marx (2017), and Terrence Malick's A Hidden Life (2019).

== Early life ==
Diehl was born in West Berlin. His father is actor Hans Diehl, his mother is a costume designer, and his brother Jakob is a composer and actor. Diehl spent his childhood in Auvergne, France, and moved back to West Germany when he was nine years old. The family lived in Hamburg, Vienna, and Düsseldorf.

== Career ==
=== 1998–2008: Early career ===
After graduating from a Waldorf school, Diehl studied acting at the Ernst Busch Academy of Dramatic Arts in Berlin. He made his film debut in 1998 as computer hacker Karl Koch in 23, winning the German Film Award (1998) for Best Actor and the Bavarian Film Award (1999) for Best Young Actor. In 2000, he was named one of the European Shooting Stars at the Berlin International Film Festival.

Over the next decade, Diehl worked extensively in film and theater. His early roles included Tattoo (2002), Love in Thoughts (2004), and Volker Schlöndorff's The Ninth Day (2004). Diehl's performance in Love in Thoughts earned him several awards, including the German Film Critics Award for Best Actor. He later appeared in films such as The Counterfeiters and Buddenbrooks.

Diehl also established a substantial stage career, working with director Peter Zadek in Sarah Kane's Cleansed, and started performing at the Burgtheater in 2000. His early roles included Konstantin in Anton Chekhov's The Seagull, for which he received the Alfred Kerr Acting Prize in 2001.

=== 2009–2016: International productions ===
In 2009, Diehl played Gestapo Major Dieter Hellstrom in Quentin Tarantino's Inglourious Basterds, followed by the action thriller Salt (2010) in which he appeared opposite Angelina Jolie. Other work during this period included If Not Us, Who? (2011), for which he earned a German Film Award nomination for Best Actor, Confession of a Child of the Century, Layla Fourie, Night Train to Lisbon, and Robert Zemeckis's Allied.

He also appeared regularly on stage at the Burgtheater in productions of Major Barbara, The Prince of Homburg, and Shakespeare's Hamlet. His performance in Hamlet earned him the 2014 Nestroy Theatre Prize for Best Actor.

=== 2017–2023: Leading roles in television and film ===
In 2017, Diehl appeared in the title role in Raoul Peck's The Young Karl Marx. He later played the leading role of Austrian conscientious objector Franz Jägerstätter in Terrence Malick's A Hidden Life, which competed for the Palme d'Or at the 2019 Cannes Film Festival.

He continued his television work during this time, appearing in the historical series Bauhaus: A New Era (2019), in which he played architect and Bauhaus founder Walter Gropius. His other television and film appearances included Perfume, Kursk, The Emperor of Paris, Plan A, The King's Man, and Munich: The Edge of War.

=== 2024–present: Recent work ===
In 2024, Diehl appeared in the fantasy-drama The Master and Margarita, based on the novel by Mikhail Bulgakov, playing a devil-like character named Woland. He also appeared in the historical drama Bonhoeffer and in The Ice Tower.

In Kirill Serebrennikov's The Disappearance of Josef Mengele (2025), he portrayed SS doctor Josef Mengele during his years evading capture in South America. His performance earned him the 2026 German Film Award for Best Leading Actor, his second win in that category.

In 2026, Diehl appeared as writer Klaus Mann in Paweł Pawlikowski's Fatherland, along with Sandra Hüller and Hanns Zischler. He is also set to appear in Peter Morgan's Netflix adaptation of The Boys from Brazil with Jeremy Strong.

== Personal life ==
Diehl was married to actress Julia Malik, but the marriage ended amicably in 2016. They have two children: a daughter born in May 2009 and a son born in 2012. Diehl plays the guitar and speaks German, Spanish, French, and English.

== Filmography ==
=== Film ===
Year	Title	Role	Notes
1998	23	Karl Koch	
1999	Entering Reality	Leon	Short film
1999	Die Braut	Fritz von Stein	
1999	Poppen	Alex	Short film
2000	Cold Is the Evening Breeze	Young Hugo Wimmer	
2000	Der Atemkünstler	—	Writer
2001	Love the Hard Way	Jeff	
2002	Tattoo	Marc Schrader	
2002	Haider lebt – 1. April 2021	A.M. Kaiser	
2003	Anatomy 2	Benjamin 'Benny' Sachs	
2003	Distant Lights	Philip	
2003	The Birch-Tree Meadow	Oskar	
2004	Love in Thoughts	Günther Scheller	
2004	The Ninth Day	Untersturmführer Gebhardt	
2005	Mouth to Mouth	Tiger	
2005	Wattläufer	Robert	Short film
2006	Slumming	Sebastian	
2006	I Am The Other Woman	Robert Fabry	
2006	Nothing But Ghosts	Felix	
2007	The Counterfeiters	Burger	
2007	Lichtblick	Perpetrator	Short film
2007	Head Under Water	Martin Wegner	
2008	Dr. Alemán	Marc	
2008	Mr. Kuka's Advice	Lothar	
2008	A Woman in Berlin	Gerd	
2008	Buddenbrooks	Christian Buddenbrook	
2009	Inglourious Basterds	Major Dieter Hellstrom	
2010	Salt	Mike Krause	
2010	The Coming Days	Konstantin Richter	
2011	If Not Us, Who?	Bernward Vesper	
2012	Confession of a Child of the Century	Desgenais	
2012	Shores Of Hope	Andreas Hornung	
2012	The Adventure of Huck Finn	Pap Finn	
2013	Layla Fourie	Eugene Pienaar	
2013	Night Train to Lisbon	Young Jorge O'Kelly	
2013	The Husband	Karl 'Rusty' Rost	
2013	Frau Ella	Klaus	
2015	The Disappearing Illusionist	Dirk Ohm	
2015	Come What May	Hans	
2016	Dark Inclusion	Gabi Ulmann	
2016	Allied	Hobar	
2017	The Young Karl Marx	Karl Marx	
2017	Midnight Confession	Kurt	Short film
2018	Kursk	Anton Markov	
2018	The Emperor of Paris	Nathanaël	
2018	The Bird Catcher	Herman	
2019	A Hidden Life	Franz Jägerstätter	
2019	The Last Vermeer	Alex De Klerks	
2021	The King's Man	Vladimir Lenin	
2021	Plan A	Max	
2022	Munich – The Edge of War	SS-Hauptsturmführer Franz Sauer	
2022	The Perfumier		
2022	The Robber Hotzenplotz	Petrosilius Zwackelmann	
2022	The Sauerdogs	Hans	Short film
2023	Sidonie in Japan	Antoine	
2024	The Master and Margarita	Woland	
2024	Bonhoeffer	Martin Niemöller	
2025	The Ice Tower	Max	
2025	The Disappearance of Josef Mengele	Josef Mengele	
2026	Fatherland	Klaus Mann	
2026	The Rays and Shadows	Otto Abetz	
2026	Beautiful Souls	Freddy	
TBA	Control		Post-production

=== Television ===
Year	Title	Role	Notes
2004	Feuer in der Nacht	Lukas Stein	Television film
2005	Kabale und Liebe	Ferdinand von Walter	Television film
2016	Close to the Enemy	Dieter Koehler	Miniseries; 7 episodes
2018	Perfume	Moritz de Vries	Miniseries; 6 episodes
2019	Bauhaus: A New Era	Walter Gropius	Miniseries; 6 episodes
2021	Furia	Jan	3 episodes
2022	Documentary Now!	Dieter Daimler	"Soldier of Illusion" Parts 1 and 2
2023	Pagan Peak (Der Pass)	Stefan Polt	Season 3
2025	Tatort: Borowski und das Haupt der Medusa	Robert Frost	Television film
2027	The Boys From Brazil	Johann-Friedrich Meinhardt	Limited series; 5 episodes

== Awards and nominations ==
Year	Award	Category	Work	Result
1999	German Film Awards	Best Leading Actor	23	Won
1999	Bavarian Film Awards	Best Young Actor	23	Won
2000	Berlin International Film Festival	Shooting Stars	—	Won
2005	German Film Awards	Best Leading Actor	The Ninth Day	Nominated
2005	German Film Critics Association Awards	Best Actor	Love in Thoughts	Won
2007	Bambi Awards	Best Actor	Nothing But Ghosts	Nominated
2010	Screen Actors Guild Awards	Outstanding Performance by a Cast in a Motion Picture	Inglourious Basterds	Won
2011	German Film Awards	Best Leading Actor	If Not Us, Who?	Nominated
2011	German Film Critics Association Awards	Best Actor	The Coming Days	Nominated
2012	Nestroy Theatre Prize	Best Actor	The Prince of Homburg	Nominated
2013	German Screen Actors Awards	Best Leading Actor	Shores of Hope	Nominated
2014	Jupiter Awards	Best German Actor	Frau Ella	Nominated
2014	Nestroy Theatre Prize	Best Actor	Hamlet	Won
2016	Nestroy Theatre Prize	Best Actor	Diese Geschichte von Ihnen	Nominated
2025	Russian Guild of Film Critics	Best Supporting Actor	The Master and Margarita	Won
2026	German Film Awards	Best Leading Actor	The Disappearance of Josef Mengele	Won
2026	Braunschweig International Film Festival	The EUROPA (European Acting Award)	Career achievement	Won
