= The Student (2016 film) =

2016 film

- International promotional poster
- Directed by: Kirill Serebrennikov
- Written by: Kirill Serebrennikov
- Starring: Pyotr Skvortsov; Viktoriya Isakova; Aleksandr Gorchilin; Yuliya Aug
- Cinematography: Vladislav Opelyants
- Music by: Ilya Demutsky
- Production company: Hype Film
- Release date: 13 May 2016 (Cannes)
- Running time: 118 minutes
- Country: Russia
- Language: Russian

The Student (Russian: Учени́к, romanized: Uchenìk) is a 2016 Russian drama film written and directed by Kirill Serebrennikov, based on Marius von Mayenburg's play Märtyrer. It stars Peter Skvortsov, Yuliya Aug, Viktoriya Isakova, and Aleksandr Gorchilin.

The film had its world premiere at the Un Certain Regard section of the 2016 Cannes Film Festival on 13 May, where it won the François Chalais Prize. It also won Best Composer at 29th European Film Awards.

== Plot ==
Veniamin Yuzhin, nicknamed Vĕnia, is a high school teenager in suburban Russia going through troublesome emotional setbacks following the harsh divorce of his parents and the subsequent disappearance of his father. His mother is a hard-working single parent holding down three jobs in order to keep her only son in school and living in their modest apartment. Venia turns to reading the Bible selectively and intensely in seeking guidance and solace in response to his changed family circumstances. His selective readings from the miniature Bible carried in the back pocket of his jeans make him disruptive in class. He is given to constant moralistic outbursts, quoting favorite Biblical passages with compulsive zeal. As a result, his mother is repeatedly summoned to the principal’s office to sort out Venia’s bizarre behavior.

In one instance, after seeing his female classmates wearing bikinis in physical education class, Venia goes on a tirade by loud, obtrusive reading of his favorite Biblical passages on chastity and continence. Although subject to derision by other classmates, the principal of the high school sees merit in his morality campaign and calls for a school code requiring female students to wear only one-piece swimsuits for physical education. One of Venia’s classmates, who walks with a congenital limp, seems attracted to this moral call and befriends the apparently otherwise friendless Venia.

Later in the week, Venia takes exception to his high school biology teacher as she is demonstrating to the class the responsible use of condoms for safe sex. Her choice of demonstration involves a show-and-tell segment involving the distribution of raw carrots to all the students in the class with sample condoms in order to teach their proper use, using the carrots as makeshift substitutes for the male organ. Venia sees this demonstration as shameless and morally corrupt, again using his favorite Biblical quotations to support his protest. When his biology teacher disagrees, Venia then takes the extreme position of making his case by counterexample and he strips naked in the classroom to “prove” the error of her ways and what would “logically” result from her classroom teachings about condoms if he did not protest. The classroom erupts in an outburst of laughter and confusion in response to Venia’s nudity and the principal is called to the classroom to quell the commotion. After restoring order to the classroom, the principal finds the biology teacher at fault for poor planning by her demonstration of safe sex with the use of raw carrots, which the principal considers is in poor taste, and the biology teacher is reprimanded.

Venia feels vindicated by the actions of the principal and intensifies his selective reading of the Bible. He tries to make a disciple out of his new-found classmate with the lame leg, and at one point Venia has him strip down to his shorts while laying his hands on his friend’s bare leg in order to heal the lameness through prayer. The attempt at healing fails and he blames his classmate’s lack of faith for the failed healing. At school, one of the female students was aroused by Venia’s nude display the other day and amorously declares that she would like him to be her boyfriend. She behaves lecherously and becomes very sexually aggressive. After some coaxing, she and Venia exchange several romantic kisses in the empty classroom, after which Venia guiltily recoils.

Matters become complicated when the biology teacher makes further protests to the administration about Venia’s seeming to get away with his zealous readings of the Bible in her classroom, which she sees as disruptive for the other students and to her classroom instruction. Meanwhile, Venia’s friend with the impaired walk seeks to deepen his relationship with Venia by asking Venia to repeat the healing exercise from the other day, and when that fails, they go down to the shore of a local lake, where he kisses Venia on the mouth to express his sexual attraction to him. Venia is shocked by the behavior which he considers aberrant to his new-found Biblical obscurantism and, ordering his classmate to read a passage aloud from his Bible, steps behind him to grab a heavy rock and strikes his classmate dead with it. He then heads back to school leaving the dead body by the shore.

Back at the school, the high school biology teacher summons a conference in the principal’s office to formalize her complaint against Venia, and Venia is called to attend the formal hearing of the complaint. During the conference, Venia suddenly and falsely accuses the biology teacher of causing him to disrobe while alone with her in her classroom while she groped his bare legs and male organs. Outraged at his slanderous accusations, the teacher soundly slaps his face. The faculty in the principal’s office are shocked by the entire spectacle and the biology teacher is fired on the spot. At the same time, a report is made to one of the other faculty members from the local police that the body of one of the other students at the school has been found by the lake dead from a mortal head injury. Not knowing of the death of this other student, the biology teacher is still emotionally shaken by Venia’s scandalous accusations and the firing from her job by the principal. She marches back to her classroom, nails her shoes to the floor, and vocally vows that she will not leave regardless of the false complaint, as she defiantly considers herself to be without fault and blameless of the accusations which have been made against her as the film ends.

== Cast ==
- Peter Skvortsov as Veniamin Yuzhin
- Yuliya Aug as Inga Yuzhina, Veniamin's mother
- Viktoriya Isakova as Elena Krasnova, Veniamin's biology teacher
- Aleksandr Gorchilin as Grigoriy Zaytsev, Veniamin's friend
- Aleksandra Revenko as Lidiya Tkacheva
- Anton Vasilev as Oleg Selnenko, Veniamin's physical education teacher
- Nikolay Roshchin as father Vsevolod
- Svetlana Bragarnik as Lyudmila Stukalina, the principal of the school
- Irina Rudnitskaya as Irina Petrovna
- Marina Klescheva as steward

== Production ==
The film is an adaptation of the stage play Märtyrer (“Martyrs”).

== Reception ==
=== Critical response ===
The Student has an approval rating of 86% on review aggregator website Rotten Tomatoes, based on 37 reviews, and an average rating of 7.3/10. The website's critical consensus states, "As visually arresting as it is thought-provoking, The Student takes a fearlessly confrontational approach to difficult themes -- and proves richly rewarding in its execution". It also has a score of 76 out of 100 on Metacritic, based on 11 critics, indicating "generally favorable reviews".
