= Zachary Wigon =

American film critic and film director

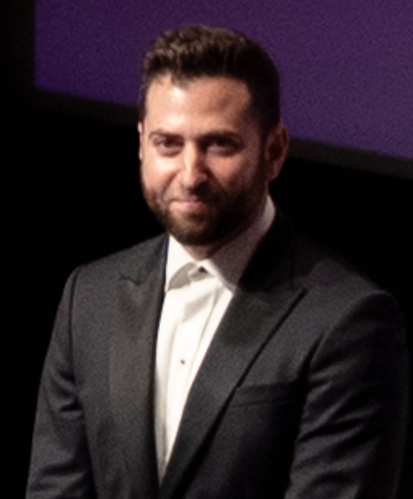
- Wigon in 2026
- Born: 1985 or 1986 (age 39–40); New York City, New York, US
- Occupations: Film critic, film director

Zachary Wigon is an American film critic and film director. He has directed the feature films The Heart Machine, Sanctuary, and Victorian Psycho.

== Biography ==
Wigon was raised in Scarsdale, New York, and attended Scarsdale Middle School, Scarsdale High School, and Tisch School of the Arts. He has contributed to Slant Magazine, Filmmaker, and The Village Voice as a film critic. Wigon has said that his experience as a filmmaker has informed his film criticism more than the reverse.

His short film Someone Else's Heart won the Hammer to Nail Short Film Contest. The short film was the basis for his debut feature film, The Heart Machine, a romantic thriller loosely based on his own experiences. It debuted at the 2014 SXSW after a crowdfunding campaign.

His next film was the 2022 psychological thriller Sanctuary, which premiered at the 47th Toronto International Film Festival. The films stars Margaret Qualley and Christopher Abbott and received positive reviews. In 2026, Wigon's third feature film, Victorian Psycho starring Maika Monroe, premiered at the Un Certain Regard section of the 2026 Cannes Film Festival.

In 2014, L Magazine named him #7 in their "Top 30 Under 30", and Paste named him #8 in their Top Ten Best New Filmmakers of 2014.

== Filmography ==
- Someone Else's Heart (2012) (short film)
- The Heart Machine (2014)
- Sanctuary (2022)
- Victorian Psycho (2026)
