= Sanctuary (2022 film) =

Film by Zachary Wigon

- Theatrical release poster
- Directed by: Zachary Wigon
- Written by: Micah Bloomberg
- Produced by: David Lancaster; Stephanie Wilcox; Ilya Stewart; Pavel Burian
- Starring: Margaret Qualley; Christopher Abbott
- Cinematography: Ludovica Isidori
- Edited by: Kate Brokaw; Lance Edmands
- Music by: Ariel Marx
- Production company: Rumble Films
- Distributed by: Neon
- Release dates: September 11, 2022 (TIFF); May 19, 2023 (United States)
- Running time: 96 minutes
- Country: United States
- Language: English
- Box office: $794,362

Sanctuary is a 2022 American dark comedy psychological thriller film directed by Zachary Wigon from a screenplay by Micah Bloomberg. It stars Margaret Qualley and Christopher Abbott as a dominatrix and her client who have an emotionally intense final session as he transitions to the life of CEO of a large company. The film had its world premiere at the Toronto International Film Festival on September 11, 2022, and received a limited theatrical release in the United States on May 19, 2023.

== Plot ==
As Hal Porterfield orders room service in a fancy hotel, Rebecca Marin arrives to interview him for the position of CEO at this hotel chain. Her questions become increasingly personal and eventually turn to sexual degradation; she is actually a dominatrix following a script that Hal has prepared. After she forces him to clean the bathroom in his underwear, she allows him to climax. While having dinner together out of character, they discuss his real-life transition to being CEO of the company after his father's death. He explains that their relationship is inappropriate for his new lifestyle and that they can no longer see each other, and gives her an expensive watch as a parting gift. Offended, she leaves abruptly.

She soon returns to the hotel room and, using some of the business philosophy that Hal's father put into his management book, alleges that Hal is unfit for his job and demands half of his first year salary ($4 million), revealing that she has recorded their sessions and will leak them to the public if he refuses. Hal acts unbothered by the blackmail threat, but he eventually trashes the apartment in a rage looking for the camera as Rebecca mocks him.

Hal accidentally shocks himself. While lying on the floor, Rebecca points out that he has become aroused. Hal says that their relationship is purely transactional; he has no emotional attachment to her and if he wanted, he could have her killed. Rebecca seems disturbed by this at first, but initiates sex at knifepoint and asserting that Hal will impregnate her, tying them together for life.

Hal goes to his laptop to arrange to have the money wired to Rebecca. She leaves again, but Hal intercepts her at the elevator and demands collateral to ensure that she will not continue to deliver blackmail threats indefinitely. She refuses and insists that there is nothing he can do to gain control. He drags her back into the hotel room and demands to know what is really happening. She shows him footage of the two of them that she has secretly recorded. Despondent, Hal ties Rebecca to a bedpost and demands she delete the footage. Instead, she reveals she has quit her job as a dominatrix and even left her fiancé as she only feels self-actualized during their sessions. Hal demands Rebecca admit she is lying, and even uses their safe word "sanctuary", but she continues to insist that they are no longer playing a game.

At his wits' end, Hal threatens to commit murder–suicide. Rebecca proposes that they engage in one final roleplay - she will act as Hal's resurrected father. Hal is reluctant, but she continues the roleplay and eventually leads him into the bathroom where she tells him to say, "I am nothing like you and I never will be." Hal responds, "I am nothing like you and I don't have to be." The two embrace and fall asleep.

Rebecca awakens on the bathroom floor as Hal cleans up the apartment. The two exit at the same time. As Hal is on his way to a ceremony in which his mother will hand over control of the company, he proposes that Rebecca become CEO instead so she can be near Hal and live the life of an independent woman in charge while he offers her emotional comfort, material support, and sex. Rebecca asks how he will explain this to his mother, and he responds that he will tell her they are in love. They kiss.

== Cast ==
- Christopher Abbott as Hal Porterfield
- Margaret Qualley as Rebecca Marin

== Production ==
In September 2021, it was announced Margaret Qualley and Christopher Abbott had joined the cast of the film, with Zachary Wigon directing from a screenplay by Micah Bloomberg. Principal photography took place in New York City.

== Release ==
Sanctuary had its world premiere at the 47th Toronto International Film Festival on September 11, 2022. A few days later, Super LTD, a division of Neon, acquired distribution rights to the film; however, it ended up being distributed under Neon. In May 2023, Universal Pictures acquired international distribution rights outside Italy, the CIS, Estonia, Latvia, Lithuania, Australia and New Zealand to the film. The film also screened at Miami Dade College's 40th Annual Miami Film Festival on March 11, 2023, where it was nominated for the Knight Marimbas Award.

It had a limited theatrical release in the United States on May 19, 2023. It was released digitally on June 20, 2023, and a physical media release on August 15.

== Reception ==
On the review aggregator website Rotten Tomatoes, 88% of 91 critics' reviews are positive, with an average rating of 7.5/10. The website's consensus reads: "Revolving around outstanding performances from Margaret Qualley and Christopher Abbott, Sanctuary confounds expectations with élan." Metacritic, which uses a weighted average, assigned the film a score of 67 out of 100, based on 17 critics, indicating "generally favorable" reviews.
