= Murad Osmann =

Russian photographer

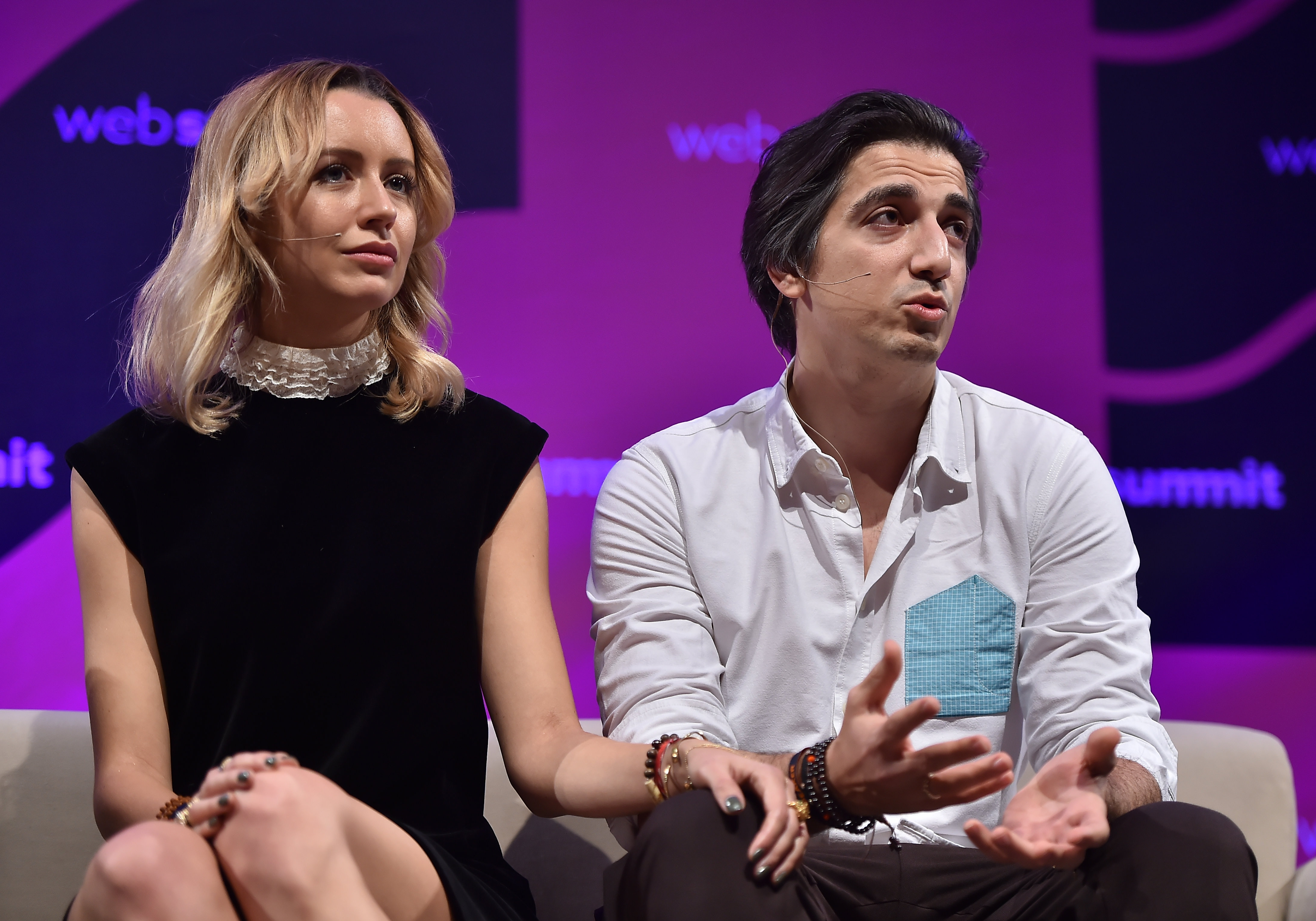
- Murad Osmann and Natalia Zakharova at Web Summit 2017
- Born: Murad Yusupovich Osmanov; 15 May 1985 (age 41); Dagestan ASSR, Russian SFSR, USSR
- Occupation: Photographer
- Known for: "Follow me" project
- Spouse: Natalia Zakharova (m. 2015)

Murad Yusupovich Osmanov (Russian: Мурад Юсупович Османов; born 15 May 1985), known professionally as Murad Osmann, is a Russian photographer based in Dubai. His series "Follow Me To" (''Следуй за мной''), made with his wife Natalia Zakharova, went viral in 2012, and the couple have since been named as top travel influencers.

== Biography and career ==
Osmann was born in the mountains of Dagestan, Russia. In 1990, when he was five years old, his family moved to Moscow. In 2001, he went to England to pursue a degree in civil engineering at Imperial College London. Osmann told FabWeb, "Photography is about capturing things other people might miss. It is a way to communicate, a way to bring images that I hold in my mind to the surface".

Osmann is a leading Travel influencer with an influencer score of 96, from influencer marketing platform Klear. Osmann is best known for the "Follow Me" project that began in Barcelona, Spain in 2011 when his then-girlfriend, Natalia Zakharova, became annoyed each time he kept stopping to take photos. She would pull him away, but he took the photograph anyway, this sparked the "Follow Me" series. According to Osmann, Nataly's impatience was the inspiration behind what has since become a social media phenomenon. Osman currently has 4.1 million followers on his Instagram account. Originally all #Followmeto photos were made on an iPhone, but recently Osmann is using a DSLR camera to have a wider field of view.

On Saturday, 6 June 2015, Osmann and Zakharova got married. The pair had two weddings, one in Moscow and the second one at Murad's birthplace in Dagestan. The photographer captured moments from their wedding to include in the "Follow Me" series.

== Books ==
In 2015, Skyhorse Publishing published Follow Me To: A Journey (a life)Around the World Through the Eyes of Two Ordinary Travelers by Murad Osmann and Nataly Zakharova.
