= Kirill Serebrennikov =

Russian director and theatre designer

- Кирилл Серебренников
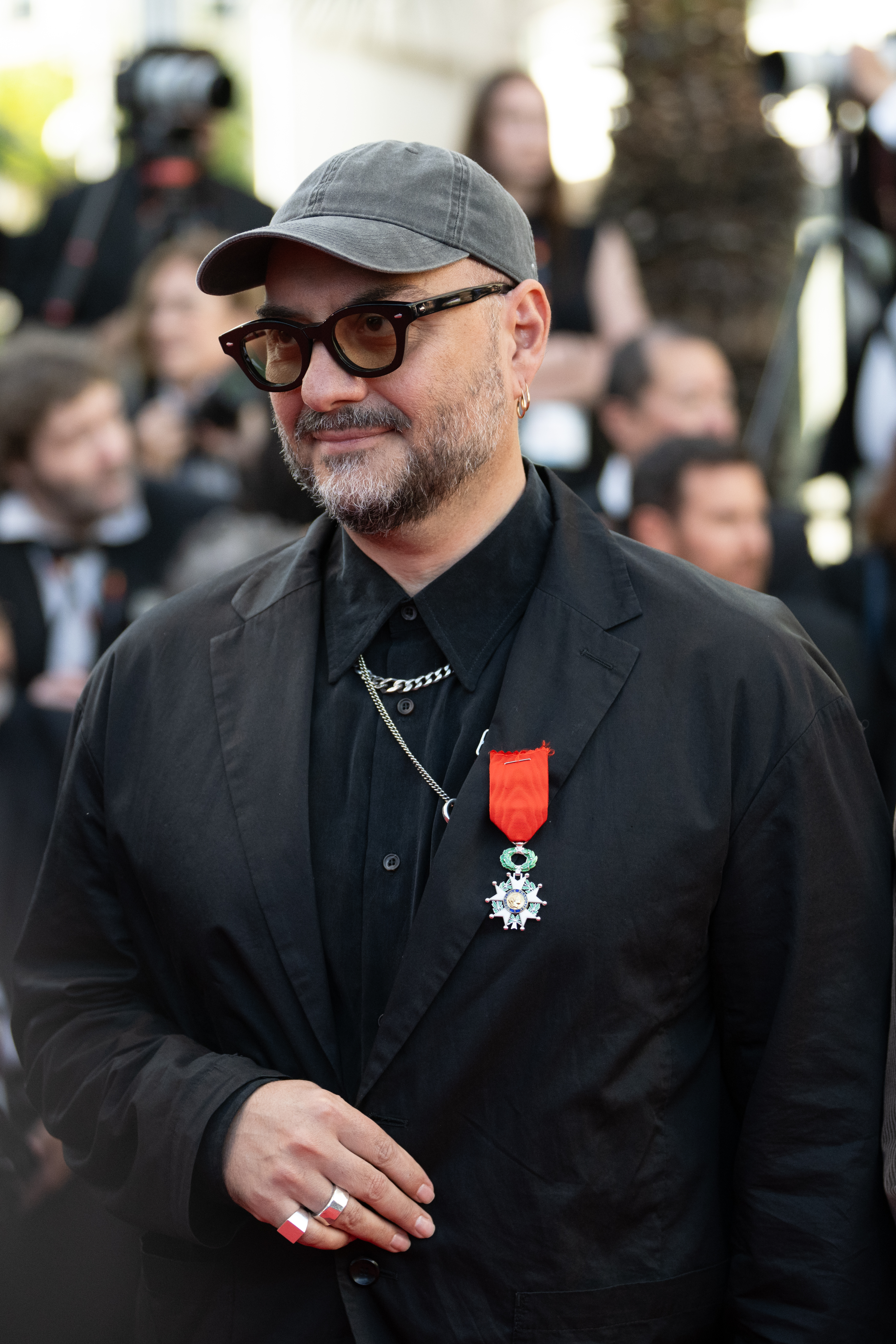
- Serebrennikov at the 2025 Cannes Film Festival
- Born: 7 September 1969 (age 57); Rostov-on-Don, Soviet Union
- Education: Rostov State University
- Occupations: Stage and film director
- Years active: 1994–present

Kirill Semyonovich Serebrennikov (Russian: Кирилл Семёнович Серебренников; born 7 September 1969) is a Russian filmmaker, stage director and theatre designer. He is most known for his drama films about Russian contemporary history and society, including: The Student (2016), Leto (2018) and Limonov: The Ballad (2024).

He won numerous international awards, including the Ordre des Arts et des Lettres in 2018, and the National Order of the Legion of Honour of France in 2025.

In 2017, he was arrested for alleged embezzlement of state funds given to the Seventh Studio, a cultural institution he headed. Serebrennikov spent almost two years under house arrest. A key witness confessed that she made accusations under pressure from the investigators, and the judge was changed. Media, international cultural community and human rights activists unanimously considered the case politically motivated and fabricated because Serebrennikov was known for his liberal and LGBTQ-friendly stances that oppose the Russian government's positions. In March 2022 the sentence was canceled.

== Early years ==
Serebrennikov was born in Rostov-on-Don, Russian SFSR, to a Jewish father and a Ukrainian mother. His father, Semyon Mikhailovich Serebrennikov, (Note: Russian: Семён Михаилович Серебренников; born 1933) was a surgeon, and his mother, Iryna Oleksandrivna Lytvyn, (Note: Ukrainian: Ірина Олександрівна Литвин; Russian: Ирина Александровна Литвин, romanized: Irina Aleksandrovna Litvin; died 17 February 2018) a teacher of Russian language and literature. Having graduated from Rostov State University with majors in physics in 1992, Serebrennikov had no formal theatre education before debuting as a stage director debut in 1994. His grandfather Alexander Ivanovich Litvin (Note: Russian: Александр Иванович Литвин) (Note: Born 1907 in Poltava, Russian Empire (now Ukraine) and died in 1987 in Kishinev, Moldovan SSR (now Chișinău, Moldova)) was a film director and screenwriter who worked at Moldova-Film from 1953 to 1972 and was titled an Honored Culture Worker of the Moldavian Soviet Socialist Republic.

According to his mother, Serebrennikov was drawn to theater as early as kindergarten age. He studied at a math school and in 8th grade established his own student theater and staged a play called Shadow. Following the will of his parents, he entered the physics department at Rostov State University and graduated with honours in 1992, but soon after graduation he started working on TV.

== Career ==
=== 1990s-2000s ===
Serebrennikov made his first steps as a professional director in 1990. In 1998 he emerged as a film director. In 2001, he staged his first production in Moscow. Serebrennikov staged Plastilin at the Centre of Drama and Directing. Later he worked at the Moscow Chekhov Theatre, Latvian National Theatre, and the Theatre of Nations. He has been active in opera staging productions for the Mariinsky Theatre and the Bolshoi Theatre, where he has also been a stage director and a designer for a ballet, and at Komische Oper Berlin and Stuttgart Opera.

For several years Serebrennikov’s career flourished under the patronage of "grey cardinal" Vladislav Surkov, the Putin aide who developed the notion of Russia’s "sovereign democracy": he even directed a stage version of a novel that Surkov wrote under a pseudonym.

In 2006 Serebrennikov became an art director of the Territory International Festival. Since 2008, he has been a professor of the Moscow Art Theatre School, where he has a class of actors and directors. His productions have been presented at the Wiener Festwochen and the Avignon Theatre Festival. His films have been screened at the Cannes Film Festival, Locarno Film Festival, Rome Film Festival, and the Warsaw International Film Festival, where his film Yuri's Day (2008) received the Grand Prix.

For TV, Serebrennikov has directed more than 100 commercials, two documentaries, 11 music videos, and three series. In 2006–07 he hosted the TV show ”Drugoe Kino” (”Other Cinema”) on channel TV3. In 2007 he hosted the talk show ”Details (Talk Show)” on STS.

In 2009 Serebrennikov launched the Platforma art incubator, a platform that supported theatre projects around Russia. By 2015, more than 340 projects were staged and released.

=== 2010s ===
In 2011 Serebrennikov staged Rimsky-Korsakov's The Golden Cockerel for the Bolshoi. The play received wide acclaim and was perceived by many as a biting satire of the Kremlin. In 2012, he was appointed artistic director of The Gogol Center. Many peers criticized his edginess and deviation from the conservative course led by Russian authorities. Zhenya Berkovich, one of Serebrennikov's students, staged one of the first plays at the Gogol Centre.

His drama film Betrayal (2012), competed for the Golden Lion at the 69th Venice International Film Festival. Marking his only entry at the Italian festival to date.

His drama film The Student (2016), based on Marius von Mayenburg's play Märtyrer, was screened in the Un Certain Regard section at the 69th Cannes Film Festival, where it won the François Chalais Prize. Also in 2016, his version of Gioachino Rossini's The Barber of Seville premiered at the Komische Oper Berlin.

Serebrennikov worked fruitfully during the home arrest in 2017: he watched videos from rehearsals, recorded the comments and sent them to cast with the help of his lawyers. That way he managed to release Mozart’s “Così Fan Tutte” in Zurich, and Verdi’s “Nabucco” in Hamburg. Also in 2017, the Bolshoi Ballet postponed the premiere of his ballet Nureyev to 2018 due to alleged "gay propaganda".

His musical film Leto (2018), filmed before his arrest, follows Soviet rock legends Viktor Tsoi and Mike Naumenko in the Leningrad underground rock scene of the early 1980s. It competed for the Palme d'Or at the 71st Cannes Film Festival, where it won the Cannes Soundtrack Award.

Three of Serebrennikov's plays received awards at the Festival d’Avignon: The Idiots, Dead Souls, and Outside (2019). In 2019 he staged ”Nasha Alla” (”Our Alla”), a tribute to the Russian prima donna Alla Pugacheva.

=== 2020s ===
In 2020 his 'Decamerone' play was staged in Berlin.

His film Petrov's Flu (2021), about a flu epidemic in Russia began filming in October 2019, few months before the COVID-19 pandemic. It competed for the Palme d'Or at the 74th Cannes Film Festival, where it won the CST Award for Best Artist-Technician for Vladislav Opelyants cinematography. It was Serebrennikov's last film theatrically released in Russia.

Serebrennikov opposed the 2022 Russian Invasion of Ukraine, leading to the cancellation of Nureyev. In March 2022, Serebrennikov was chosen to open the 76th Festival d’Avignon. His new play "The Black Monk" premiered at the festival in July 2022.

Following the invasion of Ukraine, Serebrennikov became the only Russian director to participate in the 75th Cannes Film Festival with his film Tchaikovsky's Wife (2022), which competed for the Palme d'Or. Starring Alyona Mikhaylova and Odin Biron, it follows the marriage of convenience of a young naive Antonina Miliukova with the famous composer Pyotr Ilyich Tchaikovsky. The film's premiere at Cannes was met with controversy, despite Serebrennikov's stance against the war. It was his last Russian-language production before moving to exile in Germany.

Serebrennikov's ballet adaptation of Mikhail Lermontov's A Hero of Our Time was supposed to premiere at the Bolshoi Ballet in Russia in May 2023. However, it was cancelled without explanation.

His English-language debut, Limonov: The Ballad (2024), premiered at the 77th Cannes Film Festival, marking his fourth film in a row to premiere in competition for the Palme d'Or. Co-written with Ben Hopkins and Paweł Pawlikowski, and based on Emmanuel Carrère's 2011 book Limonov. The screenplay was originally planned as Pawlikowski's next feature film, before being dropped and reworked by Serebrennikov. Starring Ben Whishaw as Russian dissident writer and politician Eduard Limonov, who founded the National Bolshevik Party. Its production was halted in Russia in early 2022, during the Russian invasion of Ukraine, filming eventually resumed in Germany in 2023, where Serebrennikov went to live in exile.

His German-language debut, The Disappearance of Josef Mengele (2025), was selected to the Cannes Premiere section of the 2025 Cannes Film Festival, marking Serebrennikov's first film to not compete for the Palme d'Or since 2016. Shot in black-and-white, it stars August Diehl as Josef Mengele, and follows the former Nazi officer in hiding in South America.

=== Upcoming projects ===
His upcoming French-language debut, After, stars Ludivine Sagnier, Fanny Ardant, Vincent Macaigne , Guillaume Gallienne and Louis Garrel. It is expected to be released in 2026.

== Personal life ==
Serebrennikov is openly gay, and is an activist of LGBTQ rights in Russia. In a 2020's interview given to The Hollywood Reporter, Serebrennikov said, “Look, if gay people are under pressure, then art and particular theater should be on their side. If there is trauma somewhere that’s where we should be — with theater, with art, with everything, right?".

=== Political beliefs ===
Serebrennikov opposed the 2022 Russian Invasion of Ukraine. Since 2022, he lives in exile in Germany.

=== Arrest and prosecution ===
On 23 May 2017, Serebrennikov's apartment and the Gogol Center facilities were raided by law enforcement agents in connection with an alleged embezzlement at the Seventh Studio. While initially no charges against Serebrennikov were filed, some of Russia's most prominent cultural figures saw the raid of his apartment as a political gesture, discouraging him and others from criticizing the government. Serebrennikov had criticised the 2014 Russian annexation of Crimea and spoken out in support of Russia’s LGBT community. Vladimir Urin and Yevgeny Mironov, among others, in May 2017 expressed their support of Serebrennikov in a letter passed on to Russian president Vladimir Putin at a public function. In July 2017 Serebrennikov's premiere of the ballet ‘Nureyev’ in Bolshoi was cancelled at the last minute.

On 22 August 2017, Serebrennikov was detained by the Investigative Committee of Russia and accused of masterminding a fraud scheme involving a state subsidy of almost 129 million rubles (about $1.9 million) the Seventh Studio received from the government of Russia for the ‘Platforma’ project from 2011 to 2014. Serebrennikov has been placed under house arrest until 19 October. Seventh Studio former director Yuri Itin was also already been placed under house arrest since 31 May 2017. While ex-chief accountant of Seventh Studio, Nina Maslyaeva, gave confessions and was held in custody. Serebrennikov refused any accusations and called the charges laughable because all the money was spent for the theater that thrived and became a world-renowned institution.

On 23 August 2017, hundreds of people gathered in front of the courthouse protesting against arrest. The case received significant media coverage and was unanimously perceived as politically motivated. Colleagues told the media that Serebrennikov was hated by many officials for his views. 34 prominent artists and cultural workers pledged to guarantee Serebrennikov’s bail payment. More than 3500 artists signed a letter of support asking the Culture Ministry to drop charges from the director. The prosecutors asked for six years in prison.

During Serebrennikov’s house arrest, in December 2017 his ballet ‘Nureev’ was premiered at the Bolshoi. Later, in 2018, the ballet received the ‘Benois de la Danse’ award.

The trial was called Kafkaesque by the media and unanimously perceived as a political mock by Serebrennikov supporters. Though the ‘Platform’ bookkeeping was indeed sloppy, the prosecutors tried to claim that the play ‘A Midsummer Night's Dream’ was never staged, though it was actually released, played abroad and won numerous international awards. Key witness of prosecution Eleonora Filimonova later told the court that she was pressured and threatened by the investigators. The house arrest was prolonged several times.

After 18 months, in June 2020, Serebrennikov was convicted and given three years of probation and a three-year ban on leading any cultural institution with governmental support. He was also required to pay a fine of 800,000 roubles. Itin and Maslyaeva were also sentenced to probation. In February 2021, Serebrennikov was fired from the Gogol Centre. On November 12, 2021, Serebrennikov repaid 129 mln roubles claimed as compensation by the Culture Ministry.

On March 28, 2022, the court canceled the suspended sentence taking into account that all financial damage was repaid and Serebrennikov received a positive profile during his term. The travel ban was lifted and Kirill was able to leave Russia.

== Filmography ==
=== Films ===
Year	English title	Original title	Notes
1998	Undressed		
2004	Ragin	Рагин	
2006	Playing the Victim	Изображая жертву	
2008	Yuri's Day	Юрьев день	
2009	Crush: 5 Love Stories		
2012	Betrayal	Измена	
2016	The Student	Учени́к	
2018	Leto	Лето	
2021	Petrov's Flu	Петровы в гриппе	
2022	Tchaikovsky's Wife	Жена Чайковского	
2024	Limonov: The Ballad		English-language debut
2025	The Disappearance of Josef Mengele	Das Verschwinden des Josef Mengele	German-language debut
TBA	After	Après	Post-production; French-language debut

=== Television ===
- Rostov-Papa (2001), 10 episodes
- The Murderer’s Diary (2002), 12 episodes
- The Golovlyov Family (2006), based on Mikhail Saltykov-Shchedrin's eponymous novel.
- Bed Stories (2003)

== Accolades ==
=== Europe Theatre Prize ===
In 2017 he was awarded the XIV Europe Prize Theatrical Realities, in Rome, with the following motivation:

Author, screenwriter, playwright, stage and film director, professor of theatre, inventor of innovative solutions in scenography, architect of new theatre spaces, teacher and instructor, Kirill Serebrennikov is the artistic director of the Gogol Centre, Moscow, where he also teaches at the School of Theatre Arts. His wide-ranging activities can be explained in part by the fact that he has no specific theatre or film training: instead he has a master’s degree in physics. Often taken for a provocateur, what he shows in his work comes essentially from his open mentality, his vision, his many talents and a way of lateral thinking, that of a scientist or a true artist, who knows how to assess and understand reality in order to critically distil its fundamental aspects, and contribute to its transformation by letting the anxieties of our time find expression.

=== Others ===
- Ordre des Arts et des Lettres (2018);
- Person of the Year in 2018 (Association of Theatre Critics) and 2019 (GQ)
- National Order of the Legion of Honour of France (2025)
