= Robert Patrick Malkassian =

American businessman and film producer

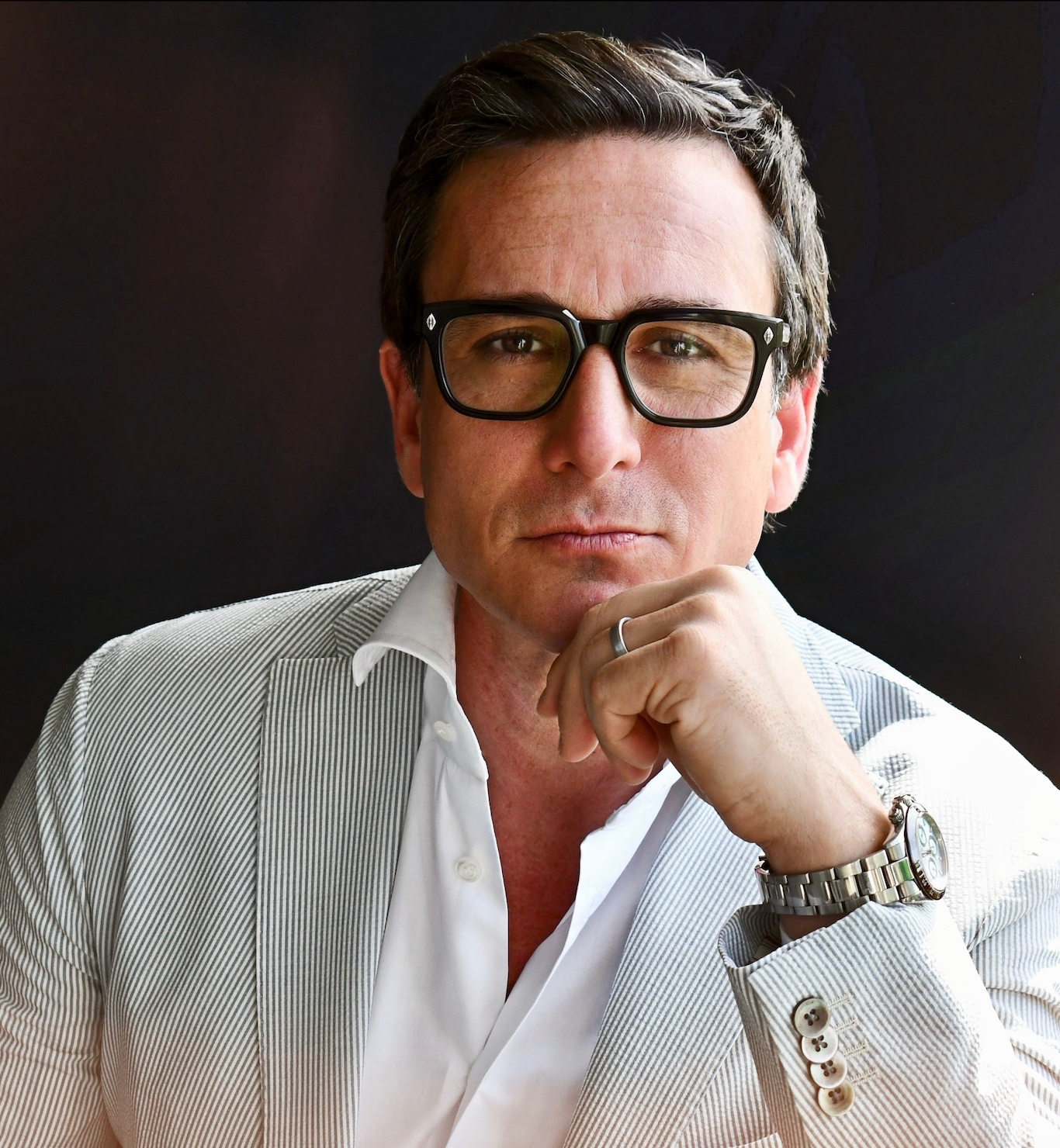
- Born: Robert Patrick Malkassian; March 17, 1971 (age 55); Oakland, California, U.S.
- Citizenship: American
- Education: Bishop O'Dowd High School, Oakland, California; University of California, Los Angeles
- Occupation: Film producer
- Years active: 2015–present
- Notable work: Amerikatsi

Robert Patrick Malkassian (born March 17, 1971) is an American film producer currently residing in San Francisco. He is best known for the film Amerikatsi, which had its premiere at the Woodstock Film Festival in 2022, where it won the Best Narrative Feature award. It was also selected as the Armenian entry for the Best International Feature Film at the 96th Academy Awards and was shortlisted for the international feature film category.

Robert Patrick Malkassian's latest feature film Sasquatch Sunset was directed by David Zellner and Nathan Zellner, and starring Riley Keough and Jesse Eisenberg. Sasquatch Sunset had its world premiere at the 2024 Sundance Film Festival on January 19, 2024, and it was released by Bleecker Street on April 12, 2024.
