= Prozhektorperiskhilton =

- Also known as: PPH
- Starring: Ivan Urgant; Garik Martirosyan; Sergei Svetlakov; Alexander Tsekalo
- Country of origin: Russia
- Original language: Russian
- No. of seasons: 5
- No. of episodes: 147

Production
- Executive producers: Maria Danielyan (2008–12); Alexander Tsekalo (2017)
- Running time: 26-50 minutes (including commercials)
- Production companies: Krasny Kvadrat (2008-2012); Sreda (2017)

Original release
- Network: Channel One (Russia)
- Release: 17 May 2008 – 10 June 2012; 4 March 2017 – 23 December 2017

Related
- Big Difference

Prozhektorperiskhilton (Прожекторперисхилтон; Spotlight on Paris Hilton) was a Russian satirical television talk show aired on Channel One. The first episode was aired on 17 May 2008.

Four hosts (Ivan Urgant, Garik Martirosyan, Sergei Svetlakov, Alexander Tsekalo) discuss current news and comment on different issues in politics and economics, similar to 7 Tage, 7 Köpfe. The show's name is a reference to the 1980s TV program "Прожектор Перестройки" ("Prozhektor Perestroyki", "Spotlight on Perestroika")—a program that was discussing current events on Soviet television during the times of Perestroika—and American socialite Paris Hilton, who, according to Svetlakov, symbolizes lack of taste. Thus, the name of the show implies that this is a current events program that shouldn't be taken seriously.

The four hosts usually discuss interesting news from newspapers, journals and the internet. From time to time they also answer questions from the audience. The show usually ends with the hosts performing a well-known song. In most cases the song is connected to an event (like the birthday of the song's author). The show is half improvised.

The show first aired until June 2012, when most hosts have switched to performing as hosts on shows airing on competing channels.

It returned in 2017 with Tsekalo as executive producer in 4 March—airing weekly on Saturdays. However, it aired only until December 23, and was cancelled starting from 2018. One of the reasons, as Svetlakov stated in an interview on Ksenia Sobchak's YouTube channel in April 2019, was that "in this stressful time our jokes would definitely offend someone".
