= Amerikatsi =

- Theatrical release poster
- Directed by: Michael A. Goorjian
- Written by: Michael A. Goorjian
- Produced by: Robert Patrick Malkassian; Sol Tryon; Arman Nshanian
- Starring: Michael A. Goorjian; Hovik Keuchkerian; Nelli Uvarova; Mikhail Trukin; Narine Grigoryan; Jean-Pierre Nshanian
- Cinematography: Ghasem Ebrahimian
- Edited by: Michael A. Goorjian; Mike Selemon
- Music by: Andranik Berberyan
- Production companies: People of Ar; Paleodon Pictures
- Distributed by: Variance Films
- Release dates: September 29, 2022 (Woodstock Film Festival); September 8, 2023 (United States)
- Running time: 116 minutes
- Country: Armenia
- Languages: Armenian; English; Russian
- Box office: $409,476

Amerikatsi (Armenian: Ամերիկացի, romanized: Amerikats'i) is a 2022 Armenian comedy-drama film written, edited, directed by, and starring Michael A. Goorjian. The film is about an Armenian-American who repatriates to the Armenian SSR after World War II and ends up in a Soviet prison.

The film premiered at Woodstock Film Festival in 2022, winning the Best Narrative Feature award. It received positive reviews. Armenian Film Society held an additional premiere for the film at its 2023 Armenian Film Festival in Glendale, California. It was also selected as the Armenian entry for the Best International Feature Film at the 96th Academy Awards.

== Synopsis ==
Armenian-American repatriate Charlie Bakhchinyan is arrested for the absurd crime of wearing a tie in Soviet Armenia. Alone in solitary confinement, he soon discovers that he can see inside of an apartment building near the prison from his cell window. By watching the native Armenian couple living in the apartment, day in and day out, Charlie soon discovers everything he returned to Armenia for.

Amerikatsi is about hope and the art of survival in the worst of conditions.

== Cast ==
- Michael A. Goorjian as Charlie Bakhchinyan
- Hovik Keuchkerian as Tigran
- Nelli Uvarova as Sona
- Mikhail Trukin as Dmitry
- Narine Grigoryan as Ruzan
- Jean-Pierre Nshanian as Warden Sargisyan

== Reception ==
Amerikatsi won the Best Narrative Feature award at the Woodstock Film Festival, the Audience Award at the Hamburg Film Festival, and the Best Narrative Feature at the Beloit International Film Festival.

It holds a 89% "Fresh" rating on review aggregator Rotten Tomatoes based on 28 reviews, with an average rating of 7.3/10. Alan Ng of Film Threat, who gave the film a positive score for example, argued that the story brings "humor and levity to a solemn subject." Film critic Richard Propes says Amerikatsi is a "film of tremendous spirit and hope."

Variety called it “gentle, humane and quietly gripping,” noting the film’s warmth and Goorjian’s nuanced portrayal. ScreenDaily praised its balance of humor and political history, describing it as “an affecting and unexpectedly uplifting story.” The Armenian outlet CivilNet noted the film’s cultural resonance and authenticity, especially in its depiction of diaspora identity and all-Armenian production.

== Accolades ==
Awards and nominations received by Amerikatsi
| Year | Award / Festival | Category | Recipient | Result | Ref |
|---|---|---|---|---|---|
| 2022 | Pomegranate Film Festival | Audience Award | Amerikatsi | Won | |
| 2023 | Woodstock Film Festival | Best Narrative Feature | Amerikatsi | Won | |
| 2023 | Hamburg Film Festival | Critics' Choice Award (Michel Award nomination noted) | Amerikatsi | Won | |
| 2023 | Beloit International Film Festival | Best Narrative Feature | Amerikatsi | Won | |
| 2023 | Salento International Film Festival | Best Actor | Michael A. Goorjian | Won | |
| 2023 | International Oriental Film Festival of Geneva (FIFOG) | Silver FIFOG Award – Feature Film Competition | Amerikatsi | Won | |
| 2024 | Anahit National Film Awards (Armenia) | Best Feature Film | Amerikatsi | Won | |
| 2024 | Anahit National Film Awards | Best Actress | Narine Grigoryan | Won | |
| 2024 | Anahit National Film Awards | Best Music | Andranik Berberyan | Won | |
| 2024 | Anahit National Film Awards | Best Production Design | Amerikatsi | Won | |

== See also ==
- List of submissions to the 96th Academy Awards for Best International Feature Film
- List of Armenian submissions for the Academy Award for Best International Feature Film
