= Beyond the Bar =

2025 South Korean television series

- Promotional poster
- Hangul: 에스콰이어: 변호사를 꿈꾸는 변호사들
- Lit.: Esquire: Lawyers Who Dream of Being Lawyers
- RR: Eseukwaieo: byeonhosareul kkumkkuneun byeonhosadeul
- MR: Esŭk'waiŏ: pyŏnhosarŭl kkumkkunŭn pyŏnhosadŭl
- Genre: Workplace; Legal drama
- Written by: Park Mi-hyun
- Directed by: Kim Jae-hong
- Starring: Lee Jin-wook; Jung Chae-yeon; Lee Hak-joo; Jeon Hye-bin
- Music by: Kim Min-ji; Yoo Min-ho
- Country of origin: South Korea
- Original language: Korean
- No. of seasons: 1
- No. of episodes: 12

Production
- Executive producer: Park Ki-yeol
- Producers: Kim Ji-won; Jang Won-seok; Kim Gun-hong; Seo Young-hee; Hong Sung-chang; Kwon Nam-jin
- Running time: 70 minutes
- Production companies: SLL; B.A. Entertainment; Studio S; Story Allum Corporation (Note: Content production division of Management Allum)

Original release
- Network: JTBC
- Release: August 2, 2025 – present

Beyond the Bar (Korean: 에스콰이어: 변호사를 꿈꾸는 변호사들) is a 2025 South Korean television series written by Park Mi-hyun, directed by Kim Jae-hong, and starring Lee Jin-wook, Jung Chae-yeon, Lee Hak-joo and Jeon Hye-bin. The first season aired on JTBC from August 2, to September 7, 2025, every Saturday and Sunday at 22:40 (KST). It is also available for streaming on Netflix. The series was renewed for a second season.

== Synopsis ==
An office drama about Kang Hyo-min, a rookie lawyer at Yullim Law Firm, who is upright and confident but awkward in social life. With the help of her partner, the cold but experienced and talented lawyer Yoon Seok-hoon, she flowers into a full-fledged lawyer.

== Cast and characters ==
=== Main ===
- Lee Jin-wook as Yoon Seok-hoon

A cold but experienced and talented lawyer.

- Jung Chae-yeon as Kang Hyo-min / Kang Hyo-ju
1. Kang Hyo-min: A rookie lawyer at Yullim Law Firm.
2. Kang Hyo-ju: Hyo-min's older twin sister.
- Lee Hak-joo as Lee Jin-woo
- Jeon Hye-bin as Heo Min-jeong

=== Supporting ===
==== Yullim's Lawyers ====
- Kim Kang-min as Ji Gook-hyeon
- Lee Ju-yeon as Choi Ho-yeon
- Pyo Jae-beom as Oh Sang-cheol
- Kim Yeo-jin as Kwon Na-yeon
- Kim Eui-sung as Ko Seung-cheol
- Park Jeong-pyo as Go Tae-seop
- Hong Seo-jun as Kim Yul-seong

==== People related to Kang Hyo-min ====
- Kwon Ah-reum as Han Seol-ah
- Lee Seung-yeon as Lee Ji-eun
- Kang Sang-jun as Han Seong-chan

== Production ==
Beyond the Bar is directed by Kim Jae-hong, who co-directed Revenant (2023), Love Scout (2025) and directed Flex X Cop (2024), and the script is written by Park Mi-hyeon. It is a co-production between SLL, BA Entertainment, Studio S and Story Allum Corporation. Kim Min-ji and Yoo Min-ho was assigned for the soundtrack of the series.

On April 1, 2026, Xports News reported that a second season was in development. In response to these reports, SLL stated that while a second season was discussed, specific details regarding the production schedule and returning cast members have not been finalized.

== Release ==
The series premiered on JTBC on August 2, 2025, and aired every Saturday and Sunday at 22:40 (KST). It is also available for streaming on Netflix.

== Viewership ==
Beyond the Bar : South Korea viewers per episode (millions)

Season	Episode number												Average
Season	1	2	3	4	5	6	7	8	9	10	11	12	Average
1	0.987	1.153	1.531	1.905	1.739	1.792	1.622	2.050	1.716	2.219	1.710	1.981	1.700

Source: Audience measurement performed nationwide by Nielsen Korea.

Average TV viewership ratings
Ep.	Original broadcast date	Average audience share (Nielsen Korea)	
Ep.	Original broadcast date	Nationwide	Seoul
1	August 2, 2025	3.703% (1st)	3.965% (1st)
2	August 3, 2025	4.714% (1st)	5.175% (1st)
3	August 9, 2025	6.727% (1st)	7.208% (1st)
4	August 10, 2025	8.318% (1st)	8.987% (1st)
5	August 16, 2025	7.168% (1st)	7.537% (1st)
6	August 17, 2025	7.701% (1st)	8.001% (1st)
7	August 23, 2025	7.044% (1st)	7.215% (1st)
8	August 24, 2025	8.681% (1st)	9.298% (1st)
9	August 30, 2025	7.141% (1st)	7.400% (1st)
10	August 31, 2025	9.101% (1st)	9.889% (1st)
11	September 6, 2025	7.541% (1st)	8.027% (1st)
12	September 7, 2025	8.439% (1st)	9.078% (1st)
Average		7.190%	7.648%
In the table above, the blue numbers represent the lowest ratings and the red numbers represent the highest ratings.; This drama aired on a cable channel/pay TV which normally has a relatively smaller audience compared to free-to-air TV/public broadcasters (KBS, SBS, MBC, and EBS).
