= The Last Minister =

- Promotional poster
- Genre: Black comedy; Political satire
- Created by: Roman Volobuev
- Written by: Roman Volobuev; Lena Vanina; Dmitry Minaev (Season 2)
- Directed by: Roman Volobuev
- Starring: Yan Tsapnik; Olga Sutulova; Sergey Epishev; Sofia Lebedeva
- Country of origin: Russia
- Original language: Russian
- No. of seasons: 2
- No. of episodes: 31

Production
- Producers: Aleksandr Tsekalo; Olga Filipuk; Dmitriy Nelidov
- Production location: Moscow
- Camera setup: Single-camera
- Running time: 24-46 minutes
- Production company: Sreda

Original release
- Network: KinoPoisk HD
- Release: March 26, 2020 – February 19, 2022

The Last Minister (Russian: Последний Министр, translit. Posledniy Ministr) is a Russian dark comedy television series made by Sreda for KinoPoisk streaming service. As of 2024, two seasons have been produced, plus a 40-minute Christmas special. Season 2 premiere episode was screened at the Kinotavr Film Festival on September 25, 2021 with the rest of the season starting to air on December 2 the same year. In February 2022 the show permanently went off the air at the request of its show-runner Roman Volobuev in protest against the Russian invasion of Ukraine.

== Premise ==
Tikhomirov, a well-meaning but hapless apparatchik in grips of mid-life crisis is appointed to run Russia's Ministry of Long-term planning - a small, underfunded, understaffed and generally ignored state agency. With a team consisting of sycophants and corrupt cynics he embarks on an idiotic quest to make Russia great again.

== Cast and characters ==
=== Main ===
- Yan Tsapnik as Tikhomirov, Minister of Long-term planning
- Olga Sutulova as Nechaeva, a corrupt 1st Deputy Minister
- Sergey Epishev as Vikentyev, an insane 2nd Deputy Minister
- Sofia Lebedeva as Sonya, a naive intern who's rapidly rising through the Ministry's ranks
- Anna Shepeleva as Ingeborge, a permanently pregnant Minister's personal assistant
- Alexey Zolotovitsky as Dudar, director of the Ministry's Directorate for External Communications
- Darya and Ekaterina Nosik as Lutch and Skotch, diabolical twins who run the Ministry's Analytical Department
- Sergey Styopin as Ukhov, an undercover FSB agent who is believed to be the Ministry's fire safety officer
- Elvira Kekeyeva as Gemma, the Ministry's HR officer
- Alexandra Drozdova as Lera, Sonya's assistant (Season 2)

=== Recurring ===
- Nelli Uvarova as Raisa, Minister's ex-wife and concrete tycoon
- Olga Dibtseva as Larisa, a biathlete and Minister's mistress
- Polina Fedina as Kira, Minister's teenage daughter
- Fyodor Lavrov as Plotnikov, a functionary from the Prime Minister's Office
- Farhad Guseinov as Nodir, Minister's personal driver
- Alisa Khazanova as Antonova, a detective with the Investigative Committee of Russia (season 2; guest season 1)
- Grigoriy Kaninin as Smirnov, a federal investigator and Antonova's partner (season 2; guest season 1)
- Alexander Iliyn as X, prime minister's chief of staff
- Roman Volobuev as Y, head of the Department of External Policy
- Ekaterina Vilkova as Z, head of the Department of Internal Policy (season 2)
- Konstantin Murzenko as Father Vitaliy, a liaison with the Russian Orthodox Church
- Ekaterina Gorina as Oksana Gerasimenko, an investigative reporter for Telegraph, Russia's only surviving newspaper (season 1)
- Ekaterina Steblina as Polina Nemirovskaya, a Moscow correspondent for The Guardian (season 2; guest season 1),
- Andrey Merzlikin as Vasya, Minister's childhood friend and a former gangster
- Yuri Tsurilo as Ranevskiy, the Governor of Saratov Oblast

=== Guests ===
- Konstantin Bogomolov as Fyodor, Russia's only Oscar-winning filmmaker (seаson 1)
- Anna Chipovskaya as Redkina, a vice president of Pornhub (seаson 1)
- Anton Bagmet as Zakhar, a writer (seаson 1)
- Viktor Kulyukhin as Snegirev, a filmmaker (seаson 1)
- Vadim Lobanov as Vladimir Pozner (seаson 1)
- Odin Biron as Edward Snowden (season 2)
- Alexander Gorchilin as Andrey Zvyaginsev (season 2)
- Sergey Gilyov as Igor F. Baranoff, Alaskan separatist (season 2)
- Timofey Tribuntsev as the voice of Prime Minister (seаson 1)
- Aleksandr Bashirov as Prime Minister (seаson 2)
- Andrey Arzyaev as Leskov, First Vice Premier (seаson 2)

== Episodes ==
Season	Episodes	Originally released	
Season	Episodes	First released	Last released
1	15	March 26, 2020	May 23, 2020
2	16	December 2, 2021	February 26, 2022

=== Season 1 (2020) ===
No. overall	No. in season	Title	Directed by	Written by	Original release date
1	1	"The Idiot (Parts I and II)"	Roman Volobuev	Roman Volobuev, Lena Vanina & Dmitriy Nelidov	March 26, 2020
2	2	"Civil Society"	Roman Volobuev	Roman Volobuev, Lena Vanina & Roman Nepomnyashchiy	April 3, 2020
3	3	"Hochwälder's Hamster"	Roman Volobuev	Roman Volobuev & Lena Vanina	April 3, 2020
4	4	"Metaphor of Childhood"	Roman Volobuev	Roman Volobuev, Lena Vanina & Roman Nepomnyashchiy	April 6, 2020
5	5	"Benevolent Paws"	Roman Volobuev	Roman Volobuev & Lena Vanina	April 11, 2020
6	6	"Love Is"	Roman Volobuev	Roman Volobuev & Lena Vanina	April 14, 2020
7	7	"I Won't Be Back"	Roman Volobuev	Roman Volobuev & Lena Vanina	April 18, 2020
8	8	"The Bigger Picture"	Roman Volobuev	Roman Volobuev & Lena Vanina	April 21, 2020
9	9	"A Sober Way"	Roman Volobuev	Roman Volobuev & Lena Vanina	April 25, 2020
10	10	"The Return"	Roman Volobuev	Roman Volobuev & Lena Vanina	May 5, 2020
11	11	"Panda Strategy"	Roman Volobuev	Roman Volobuev, Lena Vanina & Roman Nepomnyashchiy	May 9, 2020
12	12	"20 Minutes"	Roman Volobuev	Roman Volobuev	May 12, 2020
13	13	"Soul State"	Roman Volobuev	Roman Volobuev & Lena Vanina	May 16, 2020
14	14	"Heartland"	Roman Volobuev	Roman Volobuev & Lena Vanina	May 19, 2020
15	15	"Shadow On the Wall"	Roman Volobuev	Roman Volobuev	May 23, 2020

=== Season 2 (2021) ===
No. overall	No. in season	Title	Directed by	Written by	Original release date
16	0	"The Short Day"	Roman Volobuev	Roman Volobuev	December 26, 2020
17	1	"No One Promised It Would Be Easy"	Roman Volobuev	Roman Volobuev & Dmitriy Minaev	December 2, 2021
18	2	"Petting Zoo"	Roman Volobuev	Roman Volobuev & Dmitriy Minaev	December 2, 2021
19	3	"A Better Tomorrow"	Roman Volobuev	Roman Volobuev & Dmitriy Minaev	December 2, 2021
20	4	"Ministry of Fear"	Roman Volobuev	Roman Volobuev & Dmitriy Minaev	December 11, 2021
21	5	"Nostalghia"	Roman Volobuev	Roman Volobuev & Dmitriy Minaev	December 18, 2021
22	6	"Russian Spring"	Roman Volobuev	Roman Volobuev & Dmitriy Minaev	December 25, 2021
23	7	"First on the Moon"	Roman Volobuev	Roman Volobuev & Dmitriy Minaev	January 1, 2022
24	8	"Citizen X"	Roman Volobuev	Roman Volobuev & Dmitriy Minaev	January 8, 2022
25	9	"Unit B"	Roman Volobuev	Roman Volobuev & Lena Vanina	January 15, 2022
26	10	"Biopic"	Roman Volobuev	Roman Volobuev & Dmitriy Minaev	January 22, 2022
27	11	"The New Ethics"	Roman Volobuev & Polina Fedina	Roman Volobuev & Dmitriy Minaev	January 29, 2022
28	12	"The Voice of Mordor"	Roman Volobuev	Roman Volobuev & Dmitriy Minaev	February 5, 2022
29	13	"Provisional"	Roman Volobuev	Roman Volobuev & Dmitriy Minaev	February 12, 2022
30	14	"Volga Gambit"	Roman Volobuev	Roman Volobuev & Dmitriy Minaev	February 19, 2022
31	15	"The Last Draft"	Roman Volobuev	Roman Volobuev	Unaired

== Production ==
=== Background ===
Producer Aleksandr Tsekalo started developing a comedy about corrupt bureaucrats originally known as The Ministry in 2015. The pilot was written by Pavel Bardin with Maksim Pezhemsky slated to direct. Due to high level of political censorship on Russian broadcast TV Tsekalo was unable to find a network willing to commission the show, but the emergence of streaming services eventually allowed him to sidestep the obstacle. In 2018 Roman Volobuev and Lena Vaninа were signed to write a 15-episode first season with Volobuev directing.

=== Writing ===
Volobuev described The Last Minister as "an Aaron Sorkin show were everyone has irrevocably lost their conscience". Some of the show's characters and ideas were borrowed from Volobuev and Vanina's aborted series Zavtra about Russia’s liberal opposition unexpectedly winning presidential elections in 2018.

=== Filming ===
The show's first season was filmed in 2019 over period of 3 months mostly on soundstage in Moscow. Principal photography on the second season started in October 2020.

== Reception ==
=== Critical response ===
The show's first season won acclaim from Russian critics for its absurdist setting, writing and visual stile. Mikhail Trofimenkov of Kommersant called it “the one comedy to capture and preserve the spirit of ‘era of stability’ (an ironic Russian moniker for Putin's years in power)”. It was also praised for breaking an unofficial ban on LGBTQ characters on Russian TV by making one of its main protagonists — Nechaeva — a closeted lesbian. Some outlets criticised the series for relying too heavily on inside jokes and playing safe with its political subject matter. Ogoniok’s Andrey Archangelsky called out show’s writing team for “falling too much in love with their own characters, effectively becoming their hostages” and eventually “drifting away from the subjects of big politics, greed and power-lust towards much safer and well-trodden melodramatic story”.

=== Awards ===
For its first season The Last Minister was nominated for APKiT Awards in a Best Comedy Series category.

Second season was nominated for National Web Industry Awards in three categories: best series, best director and best actor.

== Censorship controversy ==
After Season 2 was completed in early 2021 its release was delayed, pre-production on the planned Season 3 was also halted. According to the BBC investigation the show was deemed ‘politically problematic’ because of episodes depicting a fictional secession of Saratov Oblast from the Russian Federation and satirising a real-life criminal case against the former Khabarovsk Krai Governor Sergei Furgal. A week after BBC Russian Service broke the story Season 2 air date was announced. KinoPoisk CEO and show’s executive producer Olga Filipuk later denied censorship claims citing “boring aspects of repertoire planning, nothing as dramatic as being banned or unbanned” as a sole reason for Season 2 being delayed.

== Going off the air in protest against Russian invasion of Ukraine ==
Season 2 finale slated to air on February 23, 2022 was shelved indefinitely in protest against Russian invasion of Ukraine. In a statement posted on Twitter Roman Volobuev wrote that this was done at his request since he no longer saw it possible to make light-hearted jokes about Russian politics. He also called out show’s supposed fans among Russian government officials: ‘Horror films should be made about you, not comedies. Go take a look in a mirror, check if your reflection still looks human’.
