= Aleksandr Tsekalo =

Soviet and Russian musician (born 1961)

- Александр Цекало
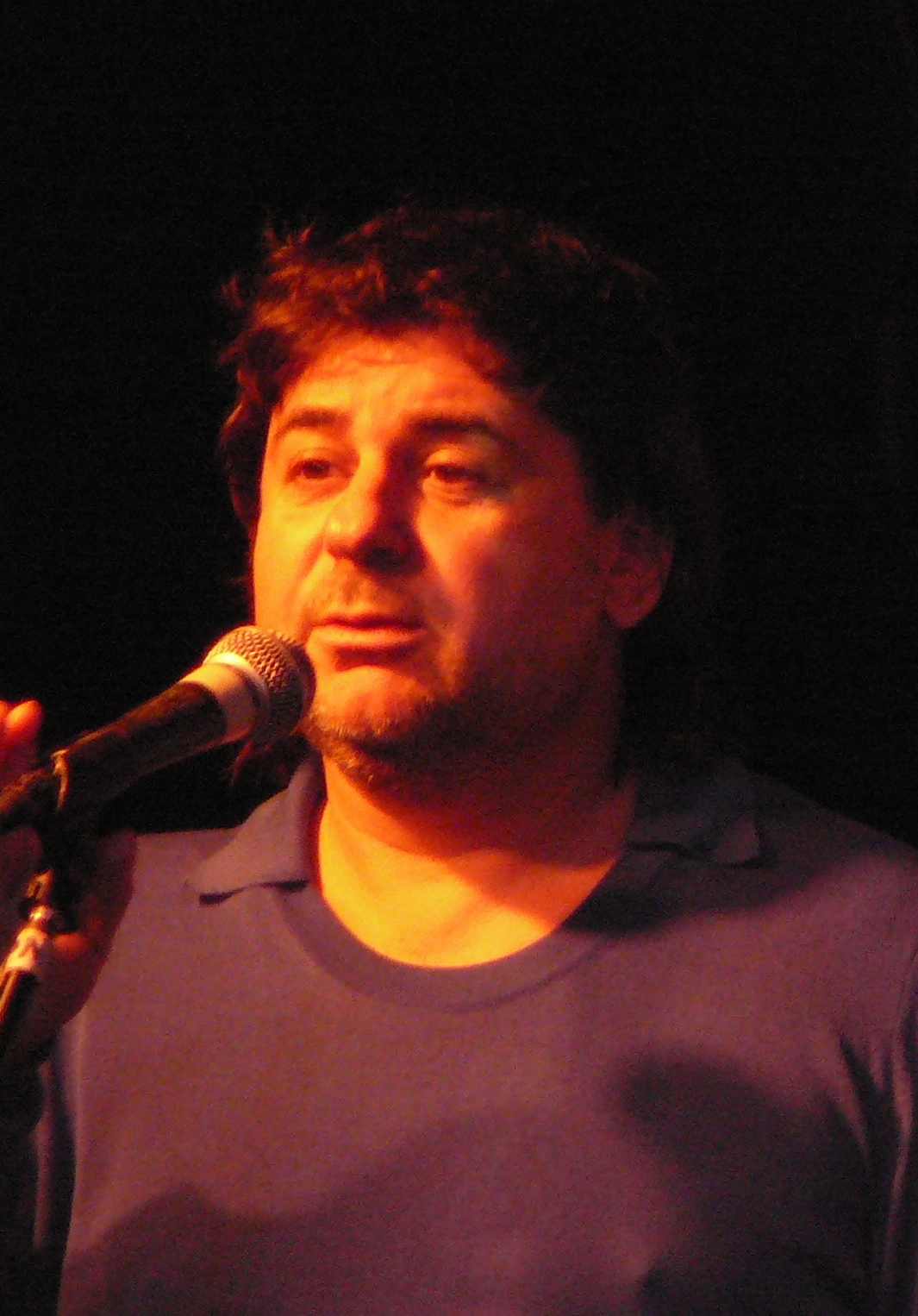
- Tsekalo in 2008
- Born: 22 March 1961 (age 65); Kyiv, Ukrainian SSR, Soviet Union
- Occupations: Television host; comedian; actor; musician; producer
- Years active: 1986–present
- Spouse: Viktoria

Aleksandr Yevgenyevich Tsekalo (Note: Russian: Александр Евгеньевич Цекало, Ukrainian: Олександр Євгенович Цекало, romanized: Oleksandr Yevhenovich Tsekalo) (born 22 March 1961) is a Soviet and Russian musician, actor, radio and TV host. Founder of production company Sreda, he has been active in television since 1986. Tsekalo was the host of Minute of Fame and Big Difference.

== Biography ==
Aleksandr Tsekalo was born on 22 March 1961 in Kyiv, in the family of thermal engineers Yevgeny Borisovich Tsekalo (11 March 1931 – May 2007), who was Ukrainian, and Elena Leonidovna Volkova (24 March 1933 – 2000), who was Jewish.

He learned to play the piano and the guitar. and at school, tried himself in stage performance activity, creating the band "ONO". He participated in amateur performances and theatrical productions.

After graduating from the Kyiv School No. 89 in 1978, Tsekalo entered the correspondence department of the Leningrad Technological Institute of the Pulp and Paper Industry; at the same time he worked in Kyiv as a fitter and adjuster and also played in amateur theatre.

In 1979 he created the quartet "Shlyapa". Later, by the invitation of the Kyiv Variety and Circus School, along with other members of the quartet entered the second year. In 1982 he graduated externally from the Leningrad Technological Institute of the Pulp and Paper Industry, worked in the chemical laboratory, as a locksmith, later at the Kyiv stage theatre as a stage installer, and as a lighting technician.

After graduating from college in 1985, he began working at the Odessa Philharmonic Theater, then at the Odessa Variety Theater "Sharzh" from Ilya Noyabryov. In 1985, together with Lolita Milyavskaya, Tsekalo formed the cabaret-duet "Akademiya", and in 1989 they arrived in Moscow. The duo performed on the stage, in clubs and restaurants, and by the mid-1990s, "Akademiya" became one of the most popular actor ensembles.

By his own admission, in parallel with the variety career in the 1990s he was engaged in political campaign managing, in particular, in 1991 he was engaged in the elections of the mayor of the French city, as a result of which the candidate whom Tsekalo supported won.

In 1996, together with Lolita Milyavskaya, he began to present the program "Good morning, country!". After the collapse of the cabaret duet "Akademiya" in 2000, Tsekalo participated in a number of television projects, including the popular series of musical films "Old Songs on the Main" (played in the third and fourth parts, and also directed and scripted a live version of the television project), voiced the film "Private Chronicles. Monologue".

In 2000, Tsekalo played the main role in Tigran Keosayan's film "Silver Lily of the Valley", for which he wrote and performed the song "Istoriya". In 2007, this song was performed by Filipp Kirkorov and was included in his album For You.

Until February 2003 he was the executive producer of the musical Nord-Ost, and then became the general producer of the company "Russian Musical", the director of the musical "12 chairs".

From September 2002 to 2005 he held the post of executive producer of entertainment programs of the department of own production of the STS channel. From 2005 to 2006 – the general producer of STS. From 1 August 2006 to 1 June 2007 – director of the department of entertainment programs of the STS. He was fired after the conflict with the general director of the channel, Alexander Rodnyansky: the latter was dissatisfied with the fact that Tsekalo, as a staff member of the STS, worked as a leading music contest "Two Stars" on Channel One, while Tsekalo himself did not accept the financial terms proposed to him.

From 2006 to 2014 and in 2017 – the presenter of the Channel One ("Two Stars", Minute of Fame, Big Difference, Prozhektorperiskhilton). From 25 June 2007 to 30 July 2008 – Deputy General Director, Director of the Directorate of Special Projects "Channel One".

In 2008 he founded Sreda, which has become one of the most significant television production companies in Russia.

In 2014, he made his debut as a journalist, interviewing the director of the directorate of the cinema channel "Channel One" Sergei Titinkov and the general producer of TNT Alexander Dulerain for the magazine GQ and with his sister-in-law Vera Brezhneva for the magazine Interview.

Tsekalo appeared as the director of creative evenings of Igor Krutoy (also a screenwriter and presenter), the Kinotavr festival (также являлся сценаристом и ведущим (also the host), the Silver Galosh prize (also a host), solo concerts by Angelica Varum (also made a video for the song "Whistle Man") and Alsou (also took part in preparing Alsou for the Eurovision Song Contest, where the singer took the second place), in addition, he was the artistic director of the award ceremony of the TEFI 2006 award, as a model and participated in the avant-garde exhibition of artists Dmitry Vrubel and Victoria Timofeeva "Orgy of Humanism", in addition, he was the host of the concert version of the CTC "Leningrad Stand-Up Club", the award of the magazine "Sobaka.ru" "TOP 50. The most famous people of Petersburg" and the weddings of ballerina Anastasia Volochkova and businessman Igor Vdovin.

Together with Ivan Urgant, Tsekalo owns the restaurant "The Sad" (meaning "garden" or "orchard") in Moscow on the Yakimanskaya Embankment, and also in late 2010, together with Alexei Bokov and Alexander Orlov, opened the restaurant "Chichibio".

== Selected filmography ==
=== Host ===
- 2006: Ty - supermodel
- 2008: Minuta slavy
- 2008–2012, 2017: Prozhektorperiskhilton
- 2008–2014: Big Difference

=== Producer ===
- 2012: Cinderella
- 2012: The Dark Side of the Moon
- 2014–2022: Silver Spoon
- 2015–2020: The Method
- 2017: Prozhektorperiskhilton
- 2017: Gogol. The Beginning
- 2017: Trotsky
- 2018: Gogol. Viy
- 2018: Gogol. Terrible Revenge
- 2019: Cop
- 2020: The Last Minister
- 2020: Just Imagine Things We Know
