= Yeva (film) =

2017 film

Yeva Եվա
- Film poster
- Directed by: Anahit Abad
- Written by: Anahit Abad
- Produced by: Taghi Aligholizadeh
- Starring: Narine Grigoryan
- Release date: 24 September 2017
- Country: Armenia
- Language: Armenian

Yeva (in Armenian Եվա, in Persian یه‌وا) is a 2017 Armenian drama film directed by Armenian-Iranian filmmaker Anahit Abad. The joint Iranian and Armenian produced film financed by the National Cinema Center of Armenia and Iran's Farabi Cinema Foundation is Anahid Abad's first long film feature. It was selected as the Armenian entry for the Best Foreign Language Film at the 90th Academy Awards held in 2018 but it was not nominated.

== Plot ==
After her husband's death, a young woman flees Yerevan to the Artsakh Republic with her daughter to escape her in-laws, but events follow her there.

== Cast ==
- Narine Grigoryan
- Shant Hovhannisyan
- Marjan Avetisyan
- Rozi Avetisyan
- Mardjan Avetisyan
- Sos Janibekyan
- Vrej Kasuni
- Nanor Petrosyan

== See also ==
- List of submissions to the 90th Academy Awards for Best Foreign Language Film
- List of Armenian submissions for the Academy Award for Best Foreign Language Film
