= Ex-Wife (TV series) =

Ex-Wife (Russian: Бывшая жена; Byvshaya zhena) is a 2013 Russian television series whose lead character, Natasha, played by Nelli Uvarova, works in a government department that seeks to collect unpaid alimony. The bailiffs of the office pursue deadbeat fathers (there's no example of a woman owing alimony) in a Russian city. In the first episode, Natasha quits a singing gig in order to join the department as an intern, and hopes to collect from her own ex-husband. Real-life tough guy (a mixed martial artist) Oleg Taktarov plays as Natasha's protective boss.

In a review of Russian television shows, The Verge called it "most inventive twist on a cop show".

It has twelve episodes in its single season.

== Cast ==
Characters include:

- Natalia (Natasha) Sergeyevna Melnik, played by Nelli Uvarova
- Victor Mikhailovich Lukin, Natasha's boss, played by Oleg Taktarov
- Kirill Valentinovich Popov, Natasha's ex-husband, played by Yuriy Baturin
- Galina Borisovna, Natasha's friend who hired her into the department, played by Viktoriya Fisher
- co-worker Anzhela Kislevskaia, played by Kristina Babushkina
- internet-savvy student co-worker Piotr (Petya) Smyslov, played by Grigoriy Kalinin
- Danila, Natasha's son, played by Sasha Drobitko

It is a Russian World Series / Russian Golden Series production.
