= Nelli Uvarova =

Russian theater and film actress (born 1980)

Nelly Uvarova
- Нелли Уварова
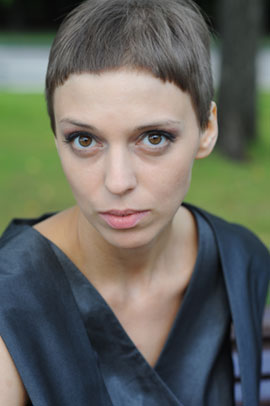
- Nelly Uvarova in 2009
- Born: Nelli Vladimirovna Uvarova; 14 March 1980 (age 46); Mažeikiai, Lithuanian SSR, USSR
- Education: All-Russian State University of Cinematography
- Occupation: Actress
- Years active: 1999–present
- Awards: (2015)
- Website: uvarovanelly.ru

Nelli Vladimirovna Uvarova (Russian: Не́лли Влади́мировна Ува́рова; born 14 March 1980) is a Russian theater and film actress.

== Early life ==
Nelli Uvarova was born in Mažeikiai, Lithuania to a Russian father and Armenian mother.

Uvarova graduated from the All-Russian State University of Cinematography, one of the most prestigious universities throughout the film industry.

== Career ==
In 1999, Nelly began to appear in the films, including the famous Boomer.

Her debut film was Let’s fly directed by Anna Melikyan. For the role in this film Uvarova was awarded the main prize at the International Institute Film Festival. For the role in the short film On Demand the actress was awarded St. Anna prize. In 2001, Uvarova joined Russian Academic Youth Theatre, where she played many prominent roles. She played Dorothy in The Wizard of Oz and Natalie Herzen in the play The Coast of Utopia.

However, a one-man show Rules of Behavior in Modern Society, became one of her most striking works. For this role, she was awarded the prize of the international festival Rainbow and was also nominated for the Golden Mask award.

The role of a charming ugly girl, (Katya) Yekaterina Pushkareva, in the TV series Not Born Beautiful (2005) became a breakthrough in Nelly's career and brought her national acclaim. During the broadcast of the series, she turned into a star of Russian television. Uvarova played in TV series such as The First Circle (2006), Atlantida (TV series) (2007), Heavy Sand and feature films I Stay, M + F and some others.

She played Natasha in Ex-Wife (Russian TV series) in 2013. Other television series she acted in include Tower: New People (2012).

In 2007, Uvarova won Lithuanian Kids Choice award for Personality of the Year.

== Selected filmography ==
- Boomer (Russian title: Бумер) (2003) as girl
- Not Born Beautiful (2005) as Yekaterina (Katya) Pushkareva
- The First Circle (2006) as Ninel
- Atlantida (Атлантида) (TV series) (2007) as Vera Stepnova
- I’m Staying (Я остаюсь) (2007) as Evgeniya Tyrsa
- Heavy Sand (Тяжёлый песок) (TV series) (2008) as Dina Ivanovskaya
- Closed Spaces (Закрытые пространства) (2008) as Tamara
- Mysterious Island (2008) as Olga
- M + F (2009) as Veronika
- Love Journal (2009)
- Close Enemy (2010) as Mariya
- Mommy (2010) as Madina
- Tower: New People (2012) as Larisa
- Ex-Wife (2013) as Natalia (Natasha) Melnik
- The Last Minister (2020) as Tikhomirova
- Amerikatsi (2022) as Sona
