= Roman Volobuev =

Russian film director, screenwriter and film producer

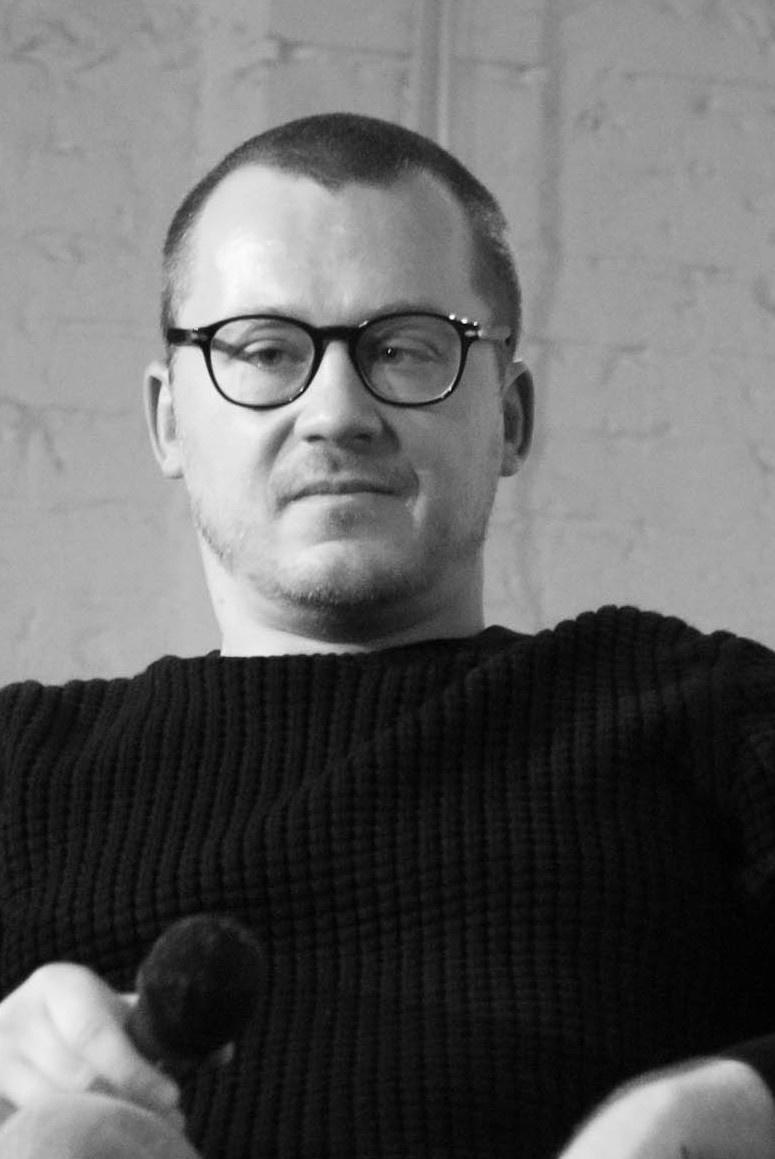
- Born: Roman Olegovich Volobuev; July 31, 1977 (age 49); Moscow, Soviet Union
- Occupations: Film director, screenwriter, producer
- Years active: 2014–present

Roman Olegovich Volobuev (Russian: Роман Олегович Волобуев; born July 31, 1977) is a Russian film and television director, writer, producer, and former film critic. Volobuev is best known for his 8-year tenure as film reviewer at Afisha magazine and for writing and directing TV series The Last Minister and Just Imagine Things We Know.

== Early life and media career ==
Born and raised in Moscow, Volobuev briefly worked as an investigative reporter at Obshaya Gazeta before starting to write film reviews for the Russian edition of Première magazine, Izvestia, Vedomosti and Iskusstvo Kino and in 2004 became a film section editor at Afisha. He also served as founding editor-in-chief of the short-lived Russian edition of Empire film magazine in 2007 and as deputy editor of GQ Russia in 2012.

== Film and TV career ==
In 2013, Volobuev and his co-writer Lena Vanina developed a political comedy series Zavtra (Tomorrow) about Russian liberal opposition winning presidential election for an independent cable news station TV Rain. Only pilot episode was produced, since TV Rain ran into political and financial troubles and could no longer finance the show. Volobuev's debut feature film The Cold Front (2016) a chamber mystery drama shot in Normandy was met with mostly lukewarm reviews and failed at the Russian box-office. His second film a satirical action comedy Blokbaster (2017) fared much better with critics and received the Special Jury Prize at Kinotavr film festival, but was disowned by Volobuev after a public spat with producers over the final cut. He eventually found a mainstream success with the black political comedy TV series The Last Minister and a 4-part mini-series about Moscow media industry Just Imagine Things We Know both released in 2020. Volobuev also co-wrote a post-apocalyptic drama series Survivors (2021) and appeared as an actor in Valeriya Gai Germanika's Brief Guide To A Happy Life (2011), Boris Khlebnikov's Hot and Bothered (2015) and Konstantin Bogomolov's A Good Man (2020).

In 2022 Volobuev condemned the Russian invasion of Ukraine and emigrated from Russia, effectively ending his local film career.

In 2023 he directed Riot Days an hour-long concert film featuring a live performance by the feminist art collective Pussy Riot.

== Political views ==
Volobuev is highly critical of Russian authorities, once calling modern Russia "an authoritarian state with good Wi-Fi and a nice urban planning". He was a vocal supporter of 2011–2013 Russian protests and has been detained during street protests in Moscow in 2012.

In 2018, after the arrest of the fellow director Kirill Serebrennikov he publicly urged Russian filmmakers to stop applying for funding from Russia's Ministry of Culture.

In 2022, in a manifesto explaining his decision to stop working in Russia after its invasion of Ukraine he compared moral choices Russian filmmakers currently face to the ones German filmmakers faced under Hitler.

== Filmography ==
Source: Kinopoisk

=== Feature films ===
Year	Film	Credited as			
Year	Film	Director	Writer	Editor	Producer
2016	The Cold Front	Yes	Yes	Yes	No
2017	Blokbaster	Yes	Yes	Yes	No
2017	Middleground	No	No	Yes	Yes
2023	The White List	No	Yes	Yes	Yes
2023	Riot Days	Yes	No	Yes	Yes

=== Television ===
Year	Title	Credited as			Notes
Year	Title	Director	Writer	Editor	Notes
2014	Zavtra	Yes	Yes	Yes	Pilot
2020–2022	The Last Minister	Yes	Yes	No	31 episodes
2020	Just Imagine Things We Know	Yes	Yes	No	4 episodes
2021	Survivors	No	Yes	No	3 episodes
2021	Okayannie Dni	Yes	No	No	1 episode
2022	Aurora	Yes	Yes	No	8 episodes

== Bibliography ==
- 500 фильмов изменивших мир (500 films that changed the word). 2006, Afisha Industries. 432 pages. ISBN 5-91151-001-4.
