= Cinderella (2012 film) =

- Directed by: Anton Bormatov
- Written by: Dmitri Zverkov; Maksim Tukhanin
- Produced by: Alexander Tsekalo; Ruslan Sorokin
- Starring: Kristina Asmus; Nikita Yefremov; Artyom Tkachenko
- Cinematography: Ilya Demin
- Music by: Konstantin Meladze
- Production companies: Sreda; Channel One Russia
- Distributed by: Central Partnership
- Release date: 14 February 2012
- Running time: 87 minutes
- Country: Russia
- Language: Russian

Cinderella (Russian: Zолушка, romanized: Zolushka) is a 2012 Russian romantic comedy film directed by Anton Bormatov. The picture is a modernized version of the Charles Perrault tale.

== Plot ==
Masha Krapivina (Kristina Asmus) comes to Moscow from Lipetsk. She studies at an institute and works as a maid for a rich family, where she has to please the mean-spirited mistress Lyudmila (Margarita Bychkova) and her two daughters: Polina (Elizaveta Boyarskaya) and Ksenia (Anna Sherling).

Meanwhile, the maid has a crush on the famous singer Alexey Korolevich (Artyom Tkachenko). Learning that the host family is going to a private party with his participation, Masha is ready to do anything to see her idol. Her aunt Agniya Bordo (Nonna Grishayeva), editor-in-chief of "Yellow PRESS", comes to her aid. She is ready to give her an invitation, but only with the condition that she fulfills a journalistic task.

== Cast ==
- Kristina Asmus as Masha "Cinderella" Krapivina
- Nikita Yefremov as Pasha, art director of the night club
- Artyom Tkachenko as Alexey "Prince" Korolevich
- Nonna Grishayeva as the Fairy / Agnia Bordo
- Margarita Isaykova as the little girl
- Yuri Stoyanov as Viktor Pavlovich Chugainov, the oil magnate
- Elizaveta Boyarskaya as sister Polina
- Anna Sherling as sister Ksenia
- Sergey Burunov as Boris Markovich, the producer
- Margarita Bychkova as stepmother Lyudmila, owner of the garbage business
- Vitaly Grebennikov as Yakov
- Alexander Tsekalo as Agnia's husband
- Semyon Strugachyov as Mikhail Levitsky

=== Cameo appearances ===
- Nikolay Baskov
- Sergey Lazarev
- Vlad Topalov
- Sati Kazanova
- Irina Toneva
- Victoria Lopyreva
- Victoria Dayneko
- Victoria Bonya
