= Attack on Leningrad =

- DVD Cover
- Directed by: Aleksandr Buravsky
- Written by: Aleksandr Buravsky; Chris Solimine
- Produced by: Aleksandr Buravsky; Chris Curling; Peter Doyle; David Gamburg; Andre Gromkovski; Leo Zisman
- Starring: Gabriel Byrne; Mira Sorvino; Aleksandr Abdulov; Vladimir Ilyin; Mikhail Efremov; Mikhail Trukhin; Yevgeni Sidikhin; Olga Sutulova; Kirill Lavrov; Armin Mueller-Stahl Alexander Beyer
- Cinematography: Vladimir Klimov
- Edited by: Mariya Sergeyenkova
- Music by: Yuri Poteyenko
- Release dates: 19 September 2009 (Oldenburg International Film Festival); 21 January 2010 (Russia)
- Running time: 110 minutes
- Countries: United Kingdom; Russia
- Languages: English; German; Russian

Attack on Leningrad, or just Leningrad, is a 2009 war film written and directed by Aleksandr Buravsky, set during the Siege of Leningrad.

== Plot ==
In 1941 Nazi Germany invaded the Soviet Union and their troops besieged the city of Leningrad. A group of foreign journalists are flown in for one day, but one of them, Kate Davis (Mira Sorvino), is presumed dead and misses the flight out. Alone in the city, she is helped by Nina Tsvetkova (Olga Sutulova), a young and idealistic police officer, and together they fight for their own and other people's survival.

== Cast ==
- Gabriel Byrne as Phillip Parker
- Mira Sorvino as Kate Davis
- Aleksandr Abdulov as Chigasov
- Vladimir Ilyin as Malinin
- Mikhail Yefremov as Omelchenko
- Marat Basharov as Yura Krasko
- Mikhail Trukhin as Vernik
- Yevgeni Sidikhin as Korneyev
- Olga Sutulova as Nina Tsvetkova
- Kirill Lavrov as Radio announcer
- Armin Mueller-Stahl as Field Marshal Von Leeb
- Alexander Beyer as Walter Hoesdorff
- Yevgeny Stychkin as Kapitsa
- Valentina Talyzina as Valentina
- Ecki Hoffmann (Ekard Khoffman) as Adolf Hitler (Gitler)

== Reception ==
=== Critical response ===
According to review aggregator site Rotten Tomatoes, it has a critic rating of 44% based on 250+ reviews.

The film was nominated for the Warsaw Award (Aleksandr Buravskiy) at the 2007 Warsaw International Film Festival, and Best Cinematography (Vladimir Klimov) at the 2008 Russian Guild of Cinematographers awards, but did not win either.
