= Middleground (film) =

- Promotional poster
- Directed by: Alisa Khazanova
- Screenplay by: Alisa Khazanova; Michael Kupisk
- Produced by: Claudio Bellante; Jillian Bokatzian; Fabrizio Conte; Ryan Alan Dearth; Ilya Dzhincharadze; Roman Volobuev
- Starring: Marisa Ryan; Rob Campbell; Noah Huntley; Chris Beetem; Daniel Raymont; Adam Davenport; Ari Barkan; Zachary Le Vey; Claudio Bellante
- Cinematography: Fedor Lyass
- Edited by: Roman Volobuev
- Music by: Igor Vdovin
- Production companies: Hype Film; IlCapo Films
- Release dates: November 2, 2017 (Russia); May 18, 2018 (United States)
- Countries: United States, Russia
- Language: English

Middleground is a Russian-American indie drama film directed and co-written by Alisa Khazanova. The film premiered at the Moscow International Film Festival on 27 June 2017 followed by a release in Russia on 2 November 2017. The film will receive a limited theatrical and VOD release in the United States on 18 May 2018.

== Plot ==
A European woman is stuck in an Upstate hotel where she keeps reliving the same day while slowly drifting away from her preoccupied American husband and towards a mysterious stranger who claims they were in love with each other some time ago.

== Cast ==
- Alisa Khazanova as Woman
- Noah Huntley as Man
- Chris Beetem as Husband
- Rob Campbell as Bartender
- Daniel Raymont as Marcus
- Marisa Ryan as Marcus' Wife
- Adam Davenport as Dinner Guest
- Ari Barkan as Partygoer #2
- Zachary Le Vey as Bill
- Claudio Bellante as James

== Reception ==
=== Critical response ===
Midleground received negative reviews from US critics. The Hollywood Reporter called it "glossily made and ambitious" while noting that its story "would have better odds on stage, where mannered, nearly content-free dialogue might play as a literary device". Filipe Freitas of Film Threat wrote in a review for the film, "Although well acted, mindful, and visually arresting, Middleground runs whimsically loose and exploratory throughout, living essentially from the intensity of its mood".

Critical reception in Russia was much more positive, with Kinopoisk reporting an 88% critical approval rating based on 18 reviews. Mikhail Trofimenkov of Kommersant called Middleground "a brave and surprising film".
