= Trotsky (TV series) =

- Genre: Biographical
- Written by: Oleg Malovichko; Ruslan Galeev; Pavel Tetersky
- Directed by: Alexander Kott; Konstantin Statsky
- Starring: Konstantin Khabensky; Olga Sutulova; Aleksandra Mareeva
- Composer: RyanOtter
- Country of origin: Russia
- Original language: Russian
- No. of series: 1
- No. of episodes: 8

Production
- Producers: Konstantin Ernst; Alexander Tsekalo; Maksim Polinskiy; Nikolai Bulygin; Aleksandra Remizova
- Cinematography: Sergei Trofimov; Nikolai Bogachov
- Production company: Sreda

Original release
- Network: Channel One Russia
- Release: 6 November – 9 November 2017

Trotsky (Russian: Троцкий) is a Russian biographical eight-episode television mini-series about Leon Trotsky directed by Alexander Kott and Konstantin Statsky. The series stars Konstantin Khabensky in the title role. It debuted on Channel One in Russia on 6 November 2017 for the centenary of the Russian Revolution. The series is a rare high-budget artistic representation of Trotsky in post-Soviet Russia, as his name was a taboo during most of the Soviet period.

A number of professional historians have strongly criticized the mini-series for its historical inaccuracies. This includes the misrepresentation of Soviet personalities including Lenin and Trotsky along with the wider events of the Russian Revolution.

== Plot ==
The series is structured as a series of flashbacks to earlier episodes in Trotsky's life, framed by events during his asylum in Mexico City (1939–1940). The first episode begins in May 1940, on the outskirts of Mexico City, when a group of Mexican Communists dressed as policemen attack Trotsky's house. After shooting into the house for nearly a quarter hour, Trotsky and his wife amazingly survive untouched. Afterwards, he reflects on his situation. Having lost almost all those close to him during his eleven years of exile from the USSR, Trotsky perceives USSR leader Stalin, will relentlessly pursue him until he is dead. Trotsky decides to leave a political testament of how a man from an oppressed minority managed to successfully overthrow the Tsarist regime and establish a new social order. He invites an ideological opponent – a Canadian journalist sympathetic to Stalin – to work with him and write that testament. Each episode of the series then explores a period in his life as an emerging leader of the Communist Revolution who then lost his new power to Stalin.

== Cast and characters ==
- Konstantin Khabensky as Leon Trotsky
- Olga Sutulova as Natalia Sedova
- Aleksandra Mareeva as Aleksandra Sokolovskaya
- Maksim Matveyev as Frank Jacson (Ramón Mercader)
- Yevgeny Stychkin as Vladimir Lenin
- Aleksandra Remizova as Nadezhda Krupskaya
- Mikhail Porechenkov as Alexander Parvus
- Andreyus Paulavichyus as Herr Kobert
- Orkhan Abulov as Joseph Stalin
- Igor Chernevich as Sigmund Freud
- Oleg Gayanov as Georgy Stepanovich Khrustalev-Nosar
- Viktoria Poltorak as Frida Kahlo
- Sergei Garmash as Nikolai Trotsky
- Mikhail Eliseev as Nicholas II
- Vitaly Kovalenko as Pyotr Stolypin
- Denis Sinyavskiy as Alexander Kerensky
- Andrei Zibrov as Wilhelm II
- Pyotr Zhuravlyov as Paul von Hindenburg
- Artur Kharitonenko as Max Hoffmann
- Sergey Bezrukov as Vladimir Skalon
- Andrei Smelov as Lavr Kornilov
- Sergey Sosnovsky as David Bronstein
- Aleksandr Bargman as Diego Rivera
- Nikolai Kachura as Maxim Gorky
- Dmitri Vorobyov as Georgi Plekhanov
- Boris Khasanov as Lev Kamenev
- Denis Pyanov as Grigory Zinoviev
- Boris Ivushin as Felix Dzerzhinsky
- Vadim Skvirskiy as Mikhail Tukhachevsky
- Vladimir Chernyshov as Yakov Sverdlov
- Anton Momot as Kliment Voroshilov
- Sergei Umanov as Leonid Krasin
- Maria Skuratova as Nina Sedova
- Artyom Bystrov as Nikolai Markin
- Ivan Tarabukin as Yakov Agranov
- Kirill Zaytsev as Fyodor Raskolnikov
- Kirill Pirogov as Ivan Ilyin
- Anastasia Meskova as Larissa Reissner
- Anton Khabarov as Alexey Schastny

== Production ==
The proposal for the series came from Konstantin Ernst, the chief of Channel 1 (other series produced by the Sreda production company were offered to TV channels during the screenwriting stage).

According to Elena Afanasieva, Director of Creative Channel Planning Directorate of the Channel 1, less than a year passed since the idea of the series was introduced and until the end of the shooting. Subsequently, Konstantin Ernst confirmed this, saying that another TV series about the revolution that the channel planned to implement was shelved, as a result which he had to urgently appeal to Alexander Tsekalo with a proposal to shoot a series about Trotsky.

Konstantin Khabensky previously portrayed Lev Trotsky in the 2005 TV series Yesenin. According to Konstantin Ernst, producer of both TV series, Khabensky played "incorrectly". Khabensky himself claims that 80% of his role was cut out, and in the new television series he plays Trotsky in accordance with his first idea.

== Reception ==
=== Release ===
It premiered on 16 October 2017 at the MIPCOM in Cannes, which was the featured highlight of the "Russian Content Revolution" program.

According to Mediascope, the series started on Channel One on 6 November 2017 with a rating of 4.9% and 14.8%, becoming the most popular TV series of Russian television for the period from 6 to 12 November 2017, having overtaken another series about the October Revolution Demon of the Revolution in the same time slot (rating - 3.6%, share - 9.7%) on Russia-1. At the end of 2018, streaming company Netflix bought the distribution right of the series and made it available on its platform.

=== Criticism ===
The series has been criticized for numerous historical inaccuracies in its depiction of Trotsky as a megalomaniacal leader who masterminded the October Revolution, invoking many of the antisemitic tropes used by the anti-communist White movement during the Russian Civil War. Among the many historical falsehoods are that he knew his assassin to be a Stalinist and invited him to write his biography for him. The important (and final) episode of Trotsky's assassination by Ramon Mercader, the NKVD agent, ordered by Joseph Stalin, and the role of his lover Sylvia, who facilitated his admission to Trotsky's household, are totally misconstrued or downplayed. Facing the criticism, Konstantin Ernst, the general producer of the series, insisted that they were aiming to weave a fictionalized narrative around the basic facts of Trotsky's biography rather than making a documentary.

The series has also been criticized by RFE/RL journalist Luke Johnson for "taking contemporary Russia’s anti-revolutionary ideology global" and for being a vehicle for Russian state propaganda, "unmistakably align[ed] with the Kremlin worldview", critical of "Western decadence" and foreign "interference" in Russian domestic affairs.

=== Awards ===
The Association of Film and Television Producers in Russia awarded the series in the categories Best Sound, Best Editing, Best Makeup, Best Art Direction, Best Cinematography, Best Special Effects, Best Actress (Olga Sutulova), Best Actor (Konstantin Khabensky), Best TV series.
