= Survivors (2021 TV series) =

Russian web television series

- Russian: Выжившие
- Genre: post-apocalyptic
- Created by: Alexander Lungin; Roman Volobuev; Yelena Vanina
- Written by: Alexander Lungin; Roman Volobuev; Yelena Vanina
- Directed by: Andrey Proshkin
- Starring: Artur Smolyaninov; Aleksey Filimonov; Anna Slyu; Aleksey Rozin; Darya Ekamasova
- Composer: Nikita Proshkin
- Country of origin: Russia
- Original language: Russian
- No. of series: 1
- No. of episodes: 8

Production
- Executive producers: Alexander Plotnikov; Bakur Bakuradze; Anton Schwartz
- Producers: Boris Khlebnikov; Anna Tikhonova; Valentin Lushkevich
- Cinematography: Artyom Emelyanov
- Running time: 52 minutes
- Production companies: Onion Film; OKKO Studios

Original release
- Network: Okko
- Release: 12 August – 23 September 2021

Survivors (Russian: Выжившие, romanized: Vyzhivshie) is a Russian science fiction television series directed by Andrei Proshkin, which premiered in the summer of 2021.

== Plot ==
The series takes place in a small Russian town where a deadly virus appears. Most of the inhabitants die, only a few people remain alive, who are affected by sleeping sickness: people cannot wake up on their own, and after two hours of sleep they fall into a coma.

== Cast ==
- Artur Smolyaninov as Sergey Shadrin
- Aleksey Filimonov as Alexander Morozov
- Darya Savelyeva as Nastya
- Anna Slyu as Dr. Marina Lavrova
- Vitaliya Korniyenko as Liza
- Aleksey Rozin as Rotny
- Darya Ekamasova as Dina
- Rosa Khairullina as Reverend
- Filipp Avdeyev as Viktor
- Natalia Bardo as Lena

== Production and premiere ==
The project was announced in 2019. The director is Andrey Proshkin, the creative producer is Boris Khlebnikov. The script was written by Alexander Lungin, Roman Volobuyev and Elena Vanina. Filming took place in November–December 2020 in the Chelyabinsk Oblast (mainly in Zlatoust, as well as in Miass and Satka).

In July 2021 the premiere took place at the International Web Series Festival Realist Web Fest. From August 12, 2021, the series is available in an online cinema Okko.

In April 2023 filming of the second season began, which took place in Moscow and the Orenburg region.
