= Flex X Cop =

2024 South Korean television series

- Hangul: 재벌X형사
- Hanja: 財閥X刑事
- Lit.: Chaebol X Detective
- RR: Jaebeol X hyeongsa
- MR: Chaebŏl X hyŏngsa
- Genre: Action; Comedy; Crime; Romance
- Written by: Kim Ba-da
- Directed by: Kim Jae-hong
- Starring: Ahn Bo-hyun; Park Ji-hyun; Kang Sang-jun; Kim Shin-bi; Kwak Si-yang
- Music by: Kim Min-ji; Yoo Min-ho
- Country of origin: South Korea
- Original language: Korean
- No. of seasons: 2
- No. of episodes: 30

Production
- Executive producers: Lee Ok-gyu (CP); Kim Jung-yeon
- Producers: Han Jung-hwan; Shin In-soo; Jang Won-suk; Kim Min-tae; Kim Dae-hyun; Park Ki-yeol
- Cinematography: Hong Seung-hyuk; Lee Jung-chul
- Editors: Lee Sang-rok; Cho Hye-sol
- Running time: 56–70 minutes
- Production companies: Studio S; Big Ocean ENM; B.A. Entertainment

Original release
- Network: SBS TV
- Release: January 26, 2024 – September 19, 2026

Related
- Silver Spoon

Flex X Cop (Korean: 재벌X형사) is a South Korean television series starring Ahn Bo-hyun, Park Ji-hyun, Kang Sang-jun, Kim Shin-bi, and Kwak Si-yang. It is based on a format created by Sreda, and a remake of the 2015 Russian television series, Silver Spoon. The first season aired on SBS TV from January 26, to March 23, 2024, every Friday and Saturday at 22:00 (KST). A second season has been confirmed. It is also available for streaming on Wavve in South Korea, and on Disney+ in selected regions. The second season aired from August 7 to September 19, 2026, every Friday and Saturday at 21:50 (KST).

== Synopsis ==
=== Season 1 ===
The series narrates the storyline of Jin I-soo, an immature third generation chaebol turned detective, and Lee Gang-hyun, a veteran detective in the violent crime department. Gang-hyun initially holds reservations about I-soo, seeing him as a disruption in her life. However, a pivotal moment in their relationship ultimately leads to them becoming partners.

=== Season 2 ===
In this season, Jin I-soo, having officially become a detective, takes on investigations on an even larger scale. Joo Hye-ra, the new leader of the violent crime department, joins the team, bringing changes to its dynamics as they take on major cases.

== Cast and characters ==
=== Main ===
- Ahn Bo-hyun as Jin I-soo
  - Jang Sun-yool as young Jin I-soo

An immature third generation chaebol turned detective who loves having fun. He catches criminals by mobilizing not only his enormous wealth and personal connections of the chaebol family, but also his brilliant brain power and various activity skills acquired while having fun.

- Park Ji-hyun as Lee Gang-hyun (season 1)
  - Nam Goong-rin as young Lee Gang-hyun

A veteran detective who loves risking her life during investigation, and apprehending criminals. She is the first female team leader in the violent crime department.

- Kang Sang-jun as Park Jun-young

Gang-hyun's friend and a member of Gangha Police Station's violent crime department. He dreamed of becoming a soccer player but decided to join the police force to not burden his mother.

- Kim Shin-bi as Choi Kyung-jin

The youngest member of Gangha Police Station's violent crime department.

- Kwak Si-yang as Jin Seung-ju

I-soo's older brother who is vice chairman of Hansu Group.

- Jung Eun-chae as Joo Hye-ra (season 2)

A former ace of the National Police Agency's Counter-Terrorism Team and the new team leader of the violent crime department team 1 at Gangha Police Station.

=== Supporting ===
==== Gangha Police Station ====
- Kim Byung-chun as Hwang Sung-gu

Chief of Gangha Police Station.

- Lee Do-yeop as Park Chan-gun

Chief detective of Gangha Police Station.

- Kim Gyeol as Ahn Byeong-sik

Team 2 leader of Gangha Police Station's violent crime department.

==== Others ====
- Jeong Ga-hee as Yoon Ji-won

A forensic doctor at the National Forensic Service.

- Kim Myung-soo as Cho Jeong-hun

I-soo's secretary who is honorary director of Hansu Group.

=== Recurring ===
==== Season 1 ====
I-soo's family

- Jang Hyun-sung as Jin Myeong-chul

I-soo's father who is chairman of Hansu Group.

- Jeon Hye-jin as Cho Hee-ja

Jin Myung-chul's wife and I-soo's step mother. She is the daughter of the Minister of Commerce, Industry and Energy.
Gang-hyun's family

- Kwon Hae-hyo as Lee Hyung-jun

Gang-hyun's father who is a former head of the criminal division at Gangha Police Station.

- Yoon Yoo-sun as Ko Mi-sook

Gang-hyun's mother.
Others

- Choi Dong-gu as Kim Young-hwan

I-soo's friend from middle school who is CEO of a movie production company. He is later killed in Season 2 and the murder was initially pinned on I-soo as it had happened at his place.

- Seo Dong-won as Lee Gi-seok

Team leader of SBC Investigative Reporting.

- Jang Hyuk-jin as Wang Jong-tae

A third-term member of the National Liberal Party and candidate for the Seoul mayoral election.

- Baek Soo-hee as Kim Jeong-yeon
- Lee Dal as Cheon Tae-sung

The youngest son of DN Group.

- Kwon Hyuk-beom as Cheon Tae-young

CEO of DN Studio and the second son of DN Group.

- Cheon Hee-ju as Jung I-na

A model of STM who is found dead on a yacht, and the illegitimate child of DN Group.

- Park Se-jun as Kwon Do-jun

Young-jae's assistant.

- Yang Jae-sung as Cheon Bang-ho

Chairman of DN Group.

- Kim Ro-sa as Lee Su-min

CEO of DN Agent and the second wife of DN Group.

- Kim Nak-kyun as Park Jong-wook

Hyeon-ju's secretary.

- Kwon Han-sol as Lee Ye-seon

Gyeong-sun's daughter.

- Lee Eun-joo as Oh Gyeong-sun

The paint attacker.

- Choi Jung-woo as Bo-ri

A member of Oryun community.

- Kim Bum-soo as Bae Jin-kyu

Hwa-young's lover who has seven convictions of fraud.

- Lee Hwa-jung as Lee Hwa-jung

An art gallery director.

- Jin Cho-rok as an auction manager
- Myung Jae-hwan as Choi Seon-u

CEO of SW Soft and an entrepreneur who is called a legend in the Korean IT industry.

- Jung Jin-woo as Cho Sung-gu

Seon-u's subordinate and leader of Customer Management Team at SW Soft.

- Lee Kwan-hun as Kim Do-young

A solver who handles complaints from high ranking people.

- Park Jin-young as Yoo Myeong-suk

A professor and psychiatrist at Hankook University Hospital and Yu-kyung past advisor.

- Choi Sung-hyuk as Woo Sang-tae

A manager and stalker of Yu-ra.

Special appearances

- Kim Eui-sung as himself
- Ahn Se-ho as Lee Chang-hyun

A serial killer.

- Oh Hee-joon as Oh Byeong-su
- Baek Jong-won as himself
- Park Se-ri
- Yoo Hee-kwan as himself
- Jung Chan-sung as himself
- Cho Gue-sung as himself
- Park Bo-kyung as CEO Ha Hye-kyung
- Kim Sun-kyung as Choi Hyeon-ju

CEO of DN Broadcast and the first wife of DN Group.

- Park Hyung-soo as Cheon Tae-jun

Vice chairman of DN Media and the first son of DN Group.

- Lee Hwang-eui as Noh Young-jae

A famous painter who was found dead at the site of his private exhibition.

- Lee Jin-hee as Joo Hwa-young

Wife and murderer of Young-jae.

- Lee Si-a as Kim Seon-young

I-soo's mother who committed suicide in the bathtub. He believed she died in a car accident through hypnotherapy

- Jang Gyu-ri as Tae Cho-hee

Kyung-jin's girlfriend.

- Kim Joong-hee as Park Jae-geun

A serial murderer pretending to be part of a volunteer organization that would take portrait photos for free.

- Han Joon-woo as Go Young-bum

A serial murderer pretending to be part of a volunteer organization that would take portrait photos for free.

- Ha Yoon-kyung as Hong Eun-a

I-soo's ex-girlfriend.

- Lee Na-eun as Han Yu-ra

A celebrity who was murdered at the filming location.

- Choi Hee-jin as Seo Yu-kyung

A psychiatrist at YK Hospital.

- Kang Sung-yeon as Baek Sang-hee

An actress who is cold and scary. She has the nickname "Ice Witch."

- Choi Tae-joon as Ha Nam-su

A famous celebrity with a huge fandom who stalks Yu-ra after their breakup.

=== Recurring ===
==== Season 2 ====
- Uhm Jun-gi as Jang Hyun-woo

An assistant director.

- Yoo Hyeon-jong as Jang Hyun-seok

Jang Hyun-woo's older brother.

- Kim Eui-sung as Jang Deuk-su

The terrorists' great-grandfather, a pro-Japanese police officer who tortured hundreds of independence activists during the Japanese colonial era.

- Ryu Abel as Kang Jae-eun

A filming Team PD.

- Lee Da-eun as Jung Da-eun
- Jung Joon-hwan as Park Hyun-soo
- Hwang Jung-yoon as Kim Min-seo
- Kim Kyu-baek as Jo Beom-gi
- Jeon Seung-hoon as Jang Jae-chun

Special appearances

- Yoo Seung-ho as Yoo Seong-won

A third-generation chaebol heir, the youngest son of UBS media group and a genius sculptor.

- Kim Hye-eun as Jung Tae-sun

A former news announcer for UBS, who later married its parent company's then-chairman and gave birth to Yoo Seong-won. She later became the chairwoman of UBS media group after her husband's death.

- Park So-yi as Park Ah-in

A 3rd-year female student at Myeongun Middle School.

- Lee Hak-joo as Yoo Tae-kwang

Leader of a killing-for-hire gang.

- Choi Deok-moon as Yum Jae-sup

President and CEO of Rosebud Hotel.

- Lee Suk as Kang Chun-sik

The only son of the president of Chunshik Food and a friend of Jin Yi-soo.

- Son Woo-hyeon as twins Park Jae-ha and Park Jae-hyung

Park Jae-ha: A magician famous for his fire-based performances.
Park Jae-hyung: A magic props engineer.

- Heo Sung-tae as Ham Sung-wook

Chairman of HMR Holdings and former leader of the Hammurabi Gang.

- Jung Chae-yeon as Ham Soo-jung

Ham Sung-wook's only daughter and Park Jae-ha's girlfriend.

- Jeon Hye-bin as Jung Joo-hee

A famous, award-winning dancer who later became the principal of Juyeon Arts High School.

- Joo Hyun-young as Ma Hyun-young

The owner of the "Witch Shop", specializing in the sale of occult and cursed items. She is also a fan of Jin Yi-soo.

- Min Kyoung-ah as Ko Dan-bi

A famous singer who lived next door to Jin Yi-soo's house, and a victim of a stalking and harassment incident.

== Production ==
=== Season 2 ===
Development

On March 18, 2024, SBS confirmed the production of Flex X Cop Season 2.

Casting

On August 14, 2025, it was reported that Park Ji-hyun would not return for the upcoming season due to scheduling conflicts, with a new actor set to join the cast.

On October 15, 2025, it was reported that Jung Eun-chae was in talks to join the second season as a new character.

On December 4, 2025, SBS officially confirmed the main cast for the second season, with Ahn Bo-hyun reprising his role and Jung Eun-chae joining the cast as the new female lead.

== Original soundtrack ==
=== Part 1 ===
Released on January 26, 2024
No.	Title	Lyrics	Music	Artist	Length
1.	"Hey!"	Kim Bum-joo; Kim Si-hyuk	Kim Bum-joo; Kim Si-hyuk	Lucy	3:03
2.	"Hey!" (Inst.)		Kim Bum-joo; Kim Si-hyuk		3:03
Total length:					6:06

=== Part 2 ===
Released on February 3, 2024
No.	Title	Lyrics	Music	Artist	Length
1.	"Shadows in the Night"	Hersh	Hersh; Taeone	Hersh	3:16
2.	"Shadows in the Night" (Inst.)		Hersh; Taeone		3:16
Total length:					6:32

=== Part 3 ===
Released on February 16, 2024
No.	Title	Lyrics	Music	Artist	Length
1.	"To. Me" (수고했어 많이)	U Seon	Jayins; Shin Jin-seop; Moon Jeong-uk	Bernard Park	4:07
2.	"To. Me" (수고했어 많이; Inst.)		Jayins; Shin Jin-seop; Moon Jeong-uk		4:07
Total length:					8:14

=== Part 4 ===
Released on March 15, 2024
No.	Title	Lyrics	Music	Artist	Length
1.	"Our Memories" (추억들로)	Jeon Je-ni	Jeon Je-ni; Park Ki-tae	Daesung	3:07
2.	"Our Memories" (추억들로; Inst.)		Jeon Je-ni; Park Ki-tae		3:07
Total length:					6:14

== Viewership ==
Flex X Cop : South Korea viewers per episode (millions)

Season	Episode number																Average
Season	1	2	3	4	5	6	7	8	9	10	11	12	13	14	15	16	Average
1	1.054	1.216	1.187	1.135	1.063	1.109	1.762	1.987	1.588	1.694	1.410	1.764	1.390	1.683	1.668	1.510	1.453
2	1.239	1.096	1.053	1.135	1.165	1.487	1.305	1.580	1.260	1.450	1.246	1.407	1.746	2.247	–		1.387

Source: Audience measurement performed nationwide by Nielsen Korea.

=== Season 1 ===
Average TV viewership ratings (season 1)
Ep.	Original broadcast date	Average audience share (Nielsen Korea)	
Ep.	Original broadcast date	Nationwide	Seoul
1	January 26, 2024	5.7% (10th)	5.8% (8th)
2	January 27, 2024	6.9% (4th)	7.0% (4th)
3	February 2, 2024	6.6% (6th)	7.2% (5th)
4	February 3, 2024	6.3% (6th)	6.6% (4th)
5	February 16, 2024	6.0% (7th)	6.9% (4th)
6	February 17, 2024	6.2% (5th)	7.2% (4th)
7	February 23, 2024	9.9% (2nd)	10.4% (1st)
8	February 24, 2024	11.0% (2nd)	11.5% (2nd)
9	March 1, 2024	9.3% (2nd)	9.9% (1st)
10	March 2, 2024	9.7% (3rd)	10.0% (2nd)
11	March 8, 2024	8.3% (2nd)	8.7% (2nd)
12	March 9, 2024	10.1% (3rd)	11.0% (2nd)
13	March 15, 2024	8.3% (4th)	8.1% (4th)
14	March 16, 2024	9.8% (2nd)	10.6% (2nd)
15	March 22, 2024	9.5% (2nd)	9.9% (1st)
16	March 23, 2024	9.3% (2nd)	10.1% (2nd)
Average		8.3%	8.8%
In the table above, the blue numbers represent the lowest ratings and the red numbers represent the highest ratings.

=== Season 2 ===
Average TV viewership ratings (season 2)
Ep.	Original broadcast date	Average audience share (Nielsen Korea)	
Ep.	Original broadcast date	Nationwide	Seoul
1	August 7, 2026	6.1% (6th)	6.0% (7th)
2	August 8, 2026	5.8% (5th)	6.8% (4th)
3	August 14, 2026	5.1% (8th)	5.3% (7th)
4	August 15, 2026	5.7% (3rd)	6.2% (3rd)
5	August 21, 2026	6.2% (6th)	7.0% (3rd)
6	August 22, 2026	7.5% (3rd)	7.8% (3rd)
7	August 28, 2026	6.7% (6th)	6.8% (4th)
8	August 29, 2026	7.9% (3rd)	8.0% (3rd)
9	September 4, 2026	6.7% (5th)	6.9% (3rd)
10	September 5, 2026	7.8% (3rd)	7.6% (3rd)
11	September 11, 2026	6.4% (6th)	6.7% (3rd)
12	September 12, 2026	7.2% (3rd)	7.2% (3rd)
13	September 18, 2026	9.4% (1st)	9.7% (1st)
14	September 19, 2026	11.8% (2nd)	11.7% (2nd)
Average		7.2%	7.4%
In the table above, the blue numbers represent the lowest ratings and the red numbers represent the highest ratings.

== Awards and nominations ==
Name of the award ceremony, year presented, category, nominee of the award, and the result of the nomination
Award ceremony	Year	Category	Nominee / Work	Result	Ref.
SBS Drama Awards	2024	Excellence Award, Actor in a Miniseries	Kwak Si-yang	Won	
SBS Drama Awards	2024	Excellence Award, Actress in a Miniseries	Park Ji-hyun	Won	
SBS Drama Awards	2024	Best New Actor	Kang Sang-jun	Won	
SBS Drama Awards	2024	Best New Actor	Kim Shin-bi	Won	
SBS Drama Awards	2024	Top Excellence Award, Actor in a Miniseries	Ahn Bo-hyun	Won	
SBS Drama Awards	2024	Excellence Award, Actor in a Miniseries	Ahn Bo-hyun	Nominated	
SBS Drama Awards	2024	Excellence Award, Actress in a Miniseries	Jeong Ga-hee	Nominated	
SBS Drama Awards	2024	Grand Prize (Daesang)	Ahn Bo-hyun	Nominated	
SBS Drama Awards	2024	Top Excellence Award, Actress in a Miniseries	Park Ji-hyun	Nominated	
SBS Drama Awards	2024	Top Excellence Award, Actress in a Miniseries	Yoon Yoo-sun	Nominated	
SBS Drama Awards	2024	Top Excellence Award, Actress in a Miniseries	Jeong Ga-hee	Nominated	
SBS Drama Awards	2024	Top Excellence Award, Actress in a Miniseries	Jeon Hye-jin	Nominated	
