= Olga Sutulova =

Russian actress (born 1980)

- Ольга Сутулова
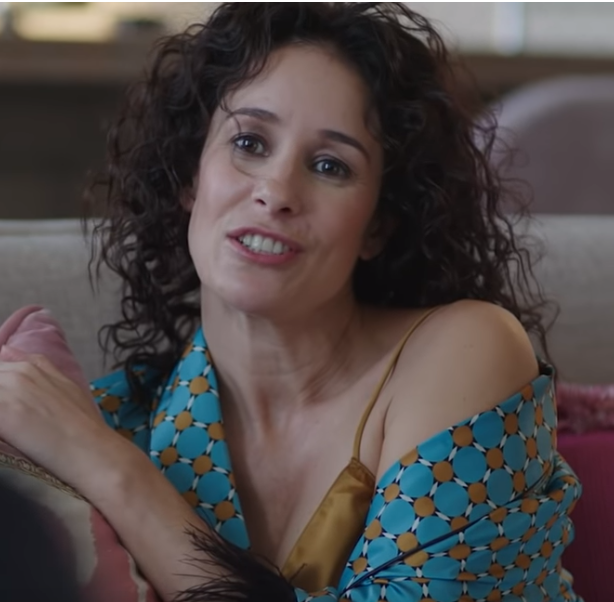
- Sutulova on the set of Gold Diggers (TV series)
- Born: Olga Aleksandrovna Sutulova; 4 May 1980 (age 46); Leningrad, RSFSR, USSR
- Occupation: Actress
- Years active: 1998–present
- Spouse: Yevgeny Stychkin

Olga Aleksandrovna Sutulova (Russian: О́льга Алекса́ндровна Суту́лова; born 4 May 1980) is a Russian theater and film actress.

== Biography ==
Olga Sutulova was born on 4 May 1980, in Leningrad, Russian SFSR, Soviet Union (now Saint Petersburg, Russia), into a family of mathematicians and engineers. She studied English from the age of five and then went to a school with in-depth study of English. For some months, Olga left for Oxford on a student exchange program. But her relationship with teachers and classmates at the Oxford school did not work out. Afterwards, Olga went to a vocational school at a shipping company, passed all the exams perfectly, but her parents did not want Olga to be a technician-mechanic, and some time later enrolled her in a school named after Alexander II in Peterhof. At age 15, she met the screenwriter Oleg Danilov and soon starred in the television series Waiting Room.

After finishing high school, Olga entered a university to study history. She graduated from the acting department VGIK (workshop of Iosif Rayhelgauz).

In late 2009, Olga married actor Yevgeny Stychkin. They starred together in the 2012 Russian-Greek film God Loves Caviar and in the 2017 TV miniseries Trotsky.

== Selected filmography ==
- 1998: Waiting Room as Sveta
- 1998: Contract with Death as Anya
- 2001: The Arena as Livia
- 2001: Give Me Moonlight as daughter
- 2002: Investigation Held by ZnaToKi: Pood of Gold as Jenya
- 2007: Attack on Leningrad as Nina Tsvetkova
- 2008: Nirvana as Alisa
- 2012: God Loves Caviar as Helena
- 2017: Trotsky as Natalia Sedova
- 2019: Russian Affairs as Alisa Olkhovskaya
- 2020: The Last Minister as Nechaeva
- 2024: Major Grom: The Game as Lieutenant General Maria Arkhipova
