= Just Imagine Things We Know =

- Genre: Drama
- Created by: Mila Prosvirina; Ilya Malanin
- Written by: Roman Volobuev; Mila Prosvirina; Ilya Malanin
- Directed by: Roman Volobuev
- Starring: Yevgeny Stychkin; Anfisa Chernykh; Rina Grishina; Katya Fedina; Yuliya Snigir
- Country of origin: Russia
- Original language: Russian
- No. of seasons: 1
- No. of episodes: 4

Production
- Producers: Aleksandr Tsekalo; Olga Filipuk
- Production location: Moscow
- Camera setup: Single-camera
- Running time: 46-37 minutes
- Production company: Sreda

Original release
- Network: KinoPoisk HD
- Release: September 24, 2020

Just Imagine Things We Know (Russian: Просто представь что мы знаем, translit. Prosto Predstav' Chto Mi Znaem) is a Russian television miniseries about the inner workings of Moscow media industry directed and primary written by Roman Volobuev, that premiered on KinoPoisk streaming service on September 24, 2020. Initially planned as an anthology series, it was renewed for a second season in 2021. Season 2 was written but never produced as a result of director being blacklisted for opposing Russian Invasion of Ukraine and eventually emigrating from Russia.

== Premise ==
5 years after surviving an assassination attempt and fleeing with his family to UK a veteran investigative journalist Evgeny Malyshev returns to Moscow to find Russian media stifled by censorship and himself effectively blacklisted. Unable to find work he's forced to join a guerrilla news operation run on a banned Telegram messenger by three 20-something clueless tabloid reporters.

== Production ==
=== Background ===
The show was inspired by a recent trend among Russia's news outlets to migratе to alternative platforms to avoid censorship and is loosely based on a real-life story behind founding of Mash one of Russia's most popular Telegram channels that currently boasts more than 895 000 subscribers.

=== Writing ===
The script originated from a series of in-depth interviews with media industry insiders and is described by its authors as a cross between a journalistic procedural and a satirical roman à clef with most of it characters being based on a real-life personalities from Moscow's media world.

=== Filming ===
Most of the first season's principal photography was done in March 2020 during the first wave of the COVID-19 pandemic allowing filmmakers to use empty exteriors of quarantined Moscow as a backdrop. The filming was halted only when city went into full lockdown. During this forced hiatus the show's script was rewritten to incorporate pandemic and also some shifts in the political climate such as unexpected decision by the Russian government of to lift a formal ban on Telegram messenger which show's characters use.

== Cast ==
=== Main ===
- Evgeny Stychkin as Malyshev, a former investigative reporter with Kommersant newspaper, who left Russia after failed assassination attempt. Controversial opposition journalist Oleg Kashin has been named as a main inspiration for the character
- Anfisa Chernykh as Bella Mambetova, a Muslim from a strict Kabardin family and a former tabloid reporter
- Rina Grishina as Ira Gromova, a former SMM, Bella's friend and business partner
- Katya Fedina as Ksusha Pogorelova, a queer Berkley-educated rich kid, operation's main field reporter

=== Recurring ===
- Yulia Snigir as Terletskaya, a paraplegic socialite and radio host, Malyshev's ex-lover and his main connection to Moscow's business and political elites
- Ekaterina Vilkova as Katya, Malyshev's philanthropist wife he leaves in London
- Maksim Vitorgan as Tyoma, a former political journalist now «working for the Dark Side» as a spokesman for the unspecified government-affiliated entity
- Artur Vakha as Georg Papa, a pro-Kremlin tabloid tycoon
- Denis Burgazliev as Ilya Khamaganov, an oligarch rumoured to be behind the attempt on Malyshev's life

== Reception ==
=== Critical response ===
The first season's critical reception in Russia was mostly positive, with Kinopoisk reporting a 79% critical approval rating based on 29 reviews, Iskusstvo Kino calling it «a smart and beautiful depiction of an ugly subject» and Gazeta.ru going as far as dubbing it «the best Russian series about journalism». Most of the criticism was directed at the small number of episodes, disorienting open ending and mentioning of real-life media figures that Snob Magazine called «a name dropping ad nauseam» and «the endless inside baseball nobody outside media crowd cares about». The show's casual depiction of LGBTQ characters also caused a backlash with Russian conservative critics, who called the series «obsessively and pointlessly queer».

Russian-Armenian media tycoon and founder of LifeNews media empire Aram Gabrelyanov on whom the character of Papa was based posted a profanity-laden review of the show on his (now deleted) personal Telegram channel in which he unfavourably compared it to HBO's «The Loudest Voice» and nicknamed it «The Loudest Fart»
