= Silver Spoon (Russian TV series) =

- Genre: Crime drama; Psychological thriller
- Directed by: Konstantin Statskiy
- Starring: Pavel Priluchny; Denis Shvedov; Karina Razumovskaya
- Composer: Pavel Esenin
- No. of seasons: 4
- No. of episodes: 41

Production
- Producers: Alexander Tsekalo; Ruslan Sorokin; Ivan Samokhvalov
- Running time: 50–52 minutes
- Production company: Sreda

Original release
- Network: C1R
- Release: 18 October 2015

Related
- Flex X Cop

Silver Spoon (Russian: Мажо́р, romanized: Mazhor) is a Russian crime drama television series produced by Sreda for Channel One Russia. It debuted in 2014. Silver Spoon was the first Russian television show to be acquired by Netflix.

== Plot ==
=== Season One ===
Igor Sokolovsky is the son of a very rich and high ranking Russian oligarch. He has received a legal education but is not in a hurry to find work for himself. Igor's parents provide for him everything and he spends all his time partying in nightclubs. While defending a friend, he gets into a fight with two policemen. His father, Vladimir Sokolovsky, uses his connections to make sure that the incident is quickly forgotten. Afterwards he deprives his son of everything and sends him to work at the very same police station with on-the-job training under the supervision of Lieutenant-Colonel Pryanikov. Initially, Igor hates his new life, but after passing through humiliation from his comrades, he gradually matures, meets his love – Captain Viktoriya Rodionova, and sets out to investigate the death of his mother who supposedly killed herself 20 years ago.

Igor Sokolovsky is arrested for the attempted murder of oligarch Arkadiy Ignatiev. He spends half a year in the penitentiary.

=== Season Two ===
Igor Sokolovsky is released from jail, as businessman Ignatiev has taken back his claim. Igor goes to freedom with the desire to take revenge, because he considers Ignatiev guilty of the death of his parents. The silver spooned one is restored in service, he leads his father's firm, passed to him by inheritance, starts a romance with Katya, the daughter of Ignatiev. Conflicts with Danila Korolev over Vika continue: between Igor and Vika there are still feelings left. And day after day hastens the denouement – the destruction of Ignatiev.

=== Season Three ===
Igor Sokolovsky has long ceased to be the Silver Spoon, for which the police service is a necessary link. His mother's death and the recent murder of his father – the two events that shaped his life can be explained largely due to this service. Silver Spoon grows as a professional every day working on the disclosure of various crimes, but the investigation of the main drama of his life puts before them new challenges.

== South Korean adaptation ==
On June 18, 2019, it was confirmed that Silver Spoon would be remade as a Korean drama series. It was planned to be produced by Supermoon Pictures (Goodbye to Goodbye, My Strange Hero) on 2020 for 16-episode series. Due to Supermoon Pictures being merged into Big Ocean ENM in 2020, the production didn't start until 2023. It was finally aired on January 26, 2024 in SBS and using the title Flex X Cop for the international audience on Disney+.
