= Rob Campbell =

American actor

Rob Campbell (born 1965 or 1966) is an actor in stage, television and films.

A native of Rochester, New York, Campbell graduated with an English degree from Wesleyan University in 1987. Disliking his job as a bond trader on Wall Street, in 1988 he began studies at the Yale School of Drama.

He performed in numerous Yale Repertory Theatre productions including The Winter's Tale alongside actress Lupita Nyong'o. On Broadway, he appeared as Yevgen Lvov in Ivanov (1998), as Governor George Wallace in All the Way (2014), and as Manus in Translations (1995).

Campbell made his screen debut in Clint Eastwood's Unforgiven.

== Filmography ==
- Unforgiven (1992) as Davey Bunting
- Ethan Frome (1993) as Young Ned
- The Stars Fell on Henrietta (1995) as Kid
- Lone Justice 2 (1995) as Roby
- The Crucible (1996) as Reverend Hale
- Hostile Waters (1997) as Sergei Preminin
- Boys Don't Cry (1999) as Brian
- The Photographer (2000) as Romeo
- Hedwig and the Angry Inch (2001) as Krzysztof
- City of Ghosts (2003) as Simon
- Dark Matter (2007) as Small
- Admission (2013) as Richard
- Winter's Tale (2014) as Gwathmi
- Middleground (2017) as Bartender

== TV series appearances ==
- Sex and the City

The Cheating Curve (1999), as Ethan Watson

- Law & Order

"Shangri-La" (2002), as Mr. Gary 'Boz' Bergan

- Law & Order: Criminal Intent

The Posthumous Collection (2004), as Daniel Heltman

- Hope & Faith, 1 episode, 2004
  - Almost Paradise (2004) TV episode .... Donnie Fuller
- Brotherhood (2006), as Carl Hobbs
- The Crossing (2018), as Paul
- The Gilded Age (2026), as Andrew Carnegie
