= Kang Sang-jun =

South Korean actor (born 1991)

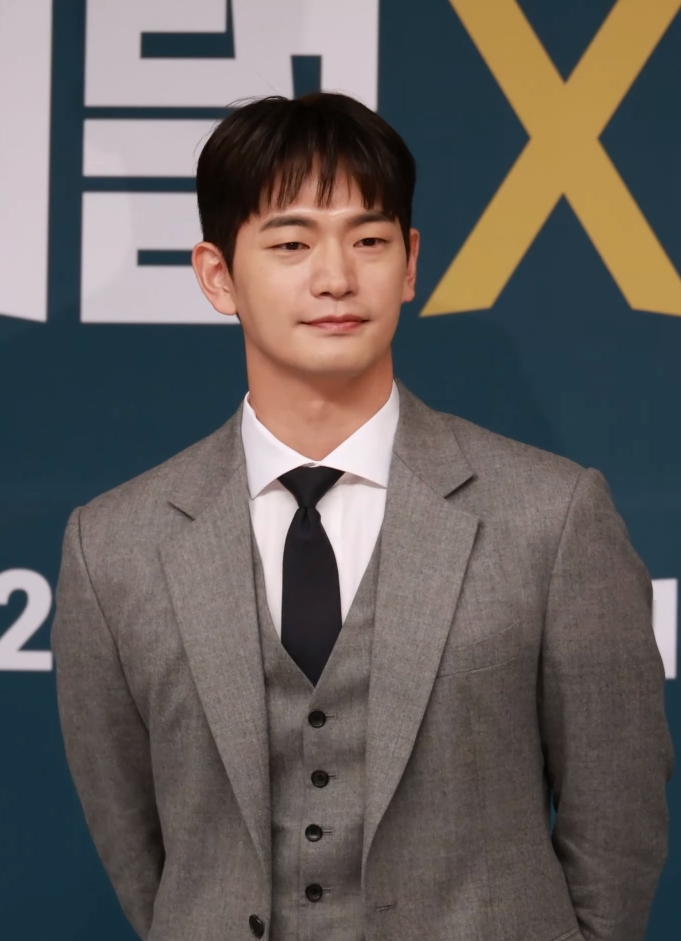
- Kang in January 2024
- Born: February 28, 1991 (age 35); South Korea
- Occupation: Actor
- Years active: 2017–present
- Agent: Cre Company
- Spouse: Lee So-na (m. 2021)

Korean name
- Hangul: 강상준
- RR: Gang Sangjun
- MR: Kang Sangjun

Kang Sang-jun (Korean: 강상준; born February 28, 1991) is a South Korean actor. He made his debut in the 2017 musical Along with the Gods: The Afterworld.

== Filmography ==
=== Television series ===
Year	Title	Role	Notes	Ref.
2023	The Villain of Romance	Oh Jin-wook		
2023	O'pening: "One Reason Why We Cannot Meet"	Kim Ki-jun		
2024	Marry My Husband	Yoo Sang-jong		
2024	Doctor Slump	Son Chan-young		
2024	Dear Hyeri	Moon Ji-on		
2024–present	Flex X Cop	Park Jun-yeong	Season 1–2	
2025	Beyond the Bar	Han Seok-chan		
2025	Cashero	Director Ki		
2026	Filing for Love	Jeong Seong-yeol		
2026	Azure Spring	Yoon Deok-hyeon		
