= Anfisa Chernykh =

Russian actress and model

- Анфиса Черных
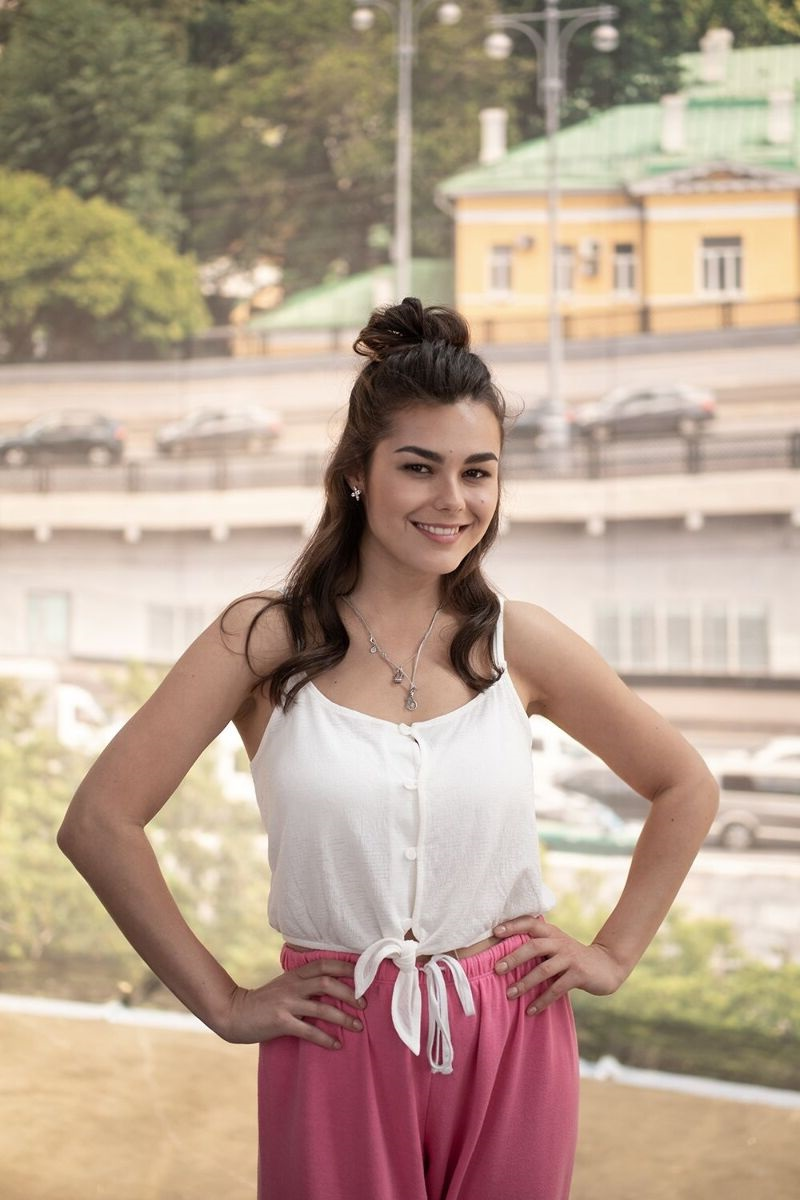
- Chernykh in 2025
- Born: Anfisa Maksimovna Chernykh; April 30, 1996 (age 30); Moscow, Russia
- Occupation: Actress
- Years active: 2009–present
- Height: 171 cm (5 ft 7 in)

Anfisa Maksimovna Chernykh (Russian: Анфи́са Макси́мовна Черны́х; born April 30, 1996) is a Russian actress and model.

== Biography ==
She was born in Moscow, Russia. She studied at the English grammar school number 297. She learned cello and piano at the Skryabin Music School and studied at Schepkin drama school. After high school, Anfisa entered the Russian Academy of Theatre Arts.

In the film debuted in 2009. Lena's role in the social drama directed by Boris Grachevsky Krysha.

She became widely known after the work in the film The Geographer Drank His Globe Away on the novel by Alexei Ivanov. Anfisa starred as Masha Bolshakova, her partner on the film was Konstantin Khabensky, starred as teacher Sluzhkin.

For this role, she was awarded several film awards, and was nominated Discovery of the Year on Nika Award, but lost to the director Zhora Kryzhovnikov.

She took part and became the winner in the show Last Hero (Season 8), which appeared on TV3 channel in 2019.

== Filmography ==
Year	Title	Role	Notes
2009	Krysha	Lena	
2013	The Geographer Drank His Globe Away	Masha Bolshakova	
2013	Flowers of Evil	Lena	miniseries
2014	Seasons of Love	episode	TV series
2014	Maya	Kristina	TV series
2016	Amateur	Dasha	TV series
2017	Buy Me	Galya	
2017	Kitchen. Last Fight	Anna Sirina	
2017	Yolki 6	Katya, nurse	
2019	Holiday	Liza	
2020	Just Imagine Things We Know	Bella	TV series
2020	Great Expectations	Zina Tarasenko	TV series
