= Woodstock Film Festival =

Annual film festival in the United States

- Promotional poster for the 2007 festival
- Location: Woodstock, New York, U.S. France
- Founded: 2000
- Awards: Maverick Award
- Language: English
- Website: woodstockfilmfestival.org

The Woodstock Film Festival (previously known as International Film Festival) is an American film festival launched in 2000 by filmmakers Meira Blaustein and Laurent Rejto in the Hudson Valley region of New York. The festival takes place each fall in the towns of Woodstock, Rosendale, Saugerties and the city of Kingston.

The Woodstock Film Festival is a not-for-profit, 501(c)(3) organization. The festival is an Academy Award-qualifying festival in the short film categories: Live Action Short Film, Animated Short Film and Documentary Short Film.

== History ==
With offices located in Woodstock, New York, the first festival ran September 21–24, 2000. It included workshops, documentaries, concerts and films from the United States and abroad.

== Awards presented ==
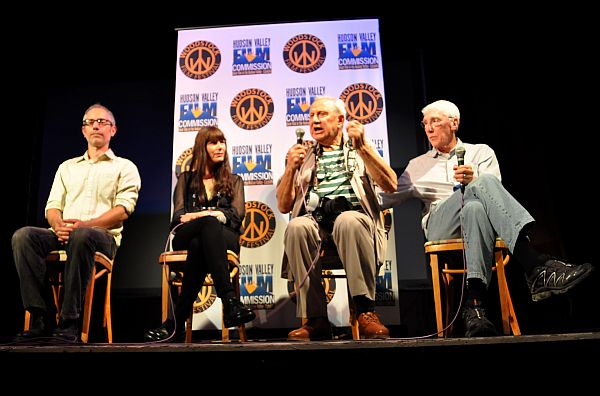
Left to right, editor Doug Abel, Woodstock Film Festival founder Meira Blaustein, photographer Ron Galella, director Leon Gast, 2010 edition

The Woodstock Film Festival is a competitive festival that offers cash and in-kind prizes in a variety of categories. The festival's "Maverick Awards," held the Saturday night of the festival are given for:

- Honorary Maverick Award
- Best Feature Narrative
- Best Feature Documentary
- Best Short Documentary
- Best Narrative
- Best Student Short
- Best Cinematography–The Haskell Wexler Award
- Best Editing
- Best Animated Short
- Audience Award for Best Feature Narrative
- Audience Award for Best Feature Documentary

== Maverick Award Honorees ==
The Honorary Maverick Award is given each year to a fixture in the world of film, typically veteran directors, actors or industry professionals who have left their permanent mark on entertainment. Past recipients have included:

- Paul Schrader (2024)
- Ethan Hawke (2022)
- Roger Ross Williams (2021)
- Julie Taymor (2018)
- Susan Sarandon (2017)
- Alejandro Gonzālez Iñárritu (2016)
- Atom Egoyan (2015)
- Darren Aronofsky (2014)
- Peter Bogdanovich (2013)
- Jonathan Demme (2012)
- Tony Kaye (2011)
- Bruce Beresford (2010)
- Richard Linklater (2009)
- Kevin Smith (2008)
- Christine Vachon (2007)
- Barbara Kopple (2006)
- Steve Buscemi (2005)
- Mira Nair (2004)
- Woody Harrelson (2003)
- Tim Robbins (2002)
- D.A. Pennebaker (2001)
- Chris Hegedus (2001)
- Les Blank (2000)

Recipients have also included professionals in the entertainment industry who have made an impact in their craft. Past recipients have included:

- Tom Quinn (2021)
- Robin Bronk (2011)
- Bob Berney (2010)
- Ted Hope (2009)
- James Schamus (2008)
- Ted Sarandos (2007)
- Jonathan Sehring (2006)
- John Sloss (2005)

== Year-round programming ==
The Woodstock Film Festival holds year-round screenings of independent films, and an annual "Taste of Woodstock" event.

2018 was the inaugural year of the Woodstock Film Festival's Youth Film Lab.

The festival holds a yearly Career Day, focused on bringing direct insight from the film world to aspiring students.

== Award winners ==
=== 2022 ===
- Best Narrative Feature: Amerikatsi
- Best Documentary Feature: Last Flight Home
- Ultra Indie Award: Hannah Ha Ha
- Best Shorts: Moshari for Short Narrative; As Far As They Can Run for Best Short Documentary; Buzzkill for Best Animation
- Honorary award recipients included Ethan Hawke, Awkwafina, Leave No Trace director Debra Granik and IFC Films president Arianna Bocco.
