= Big Difference =

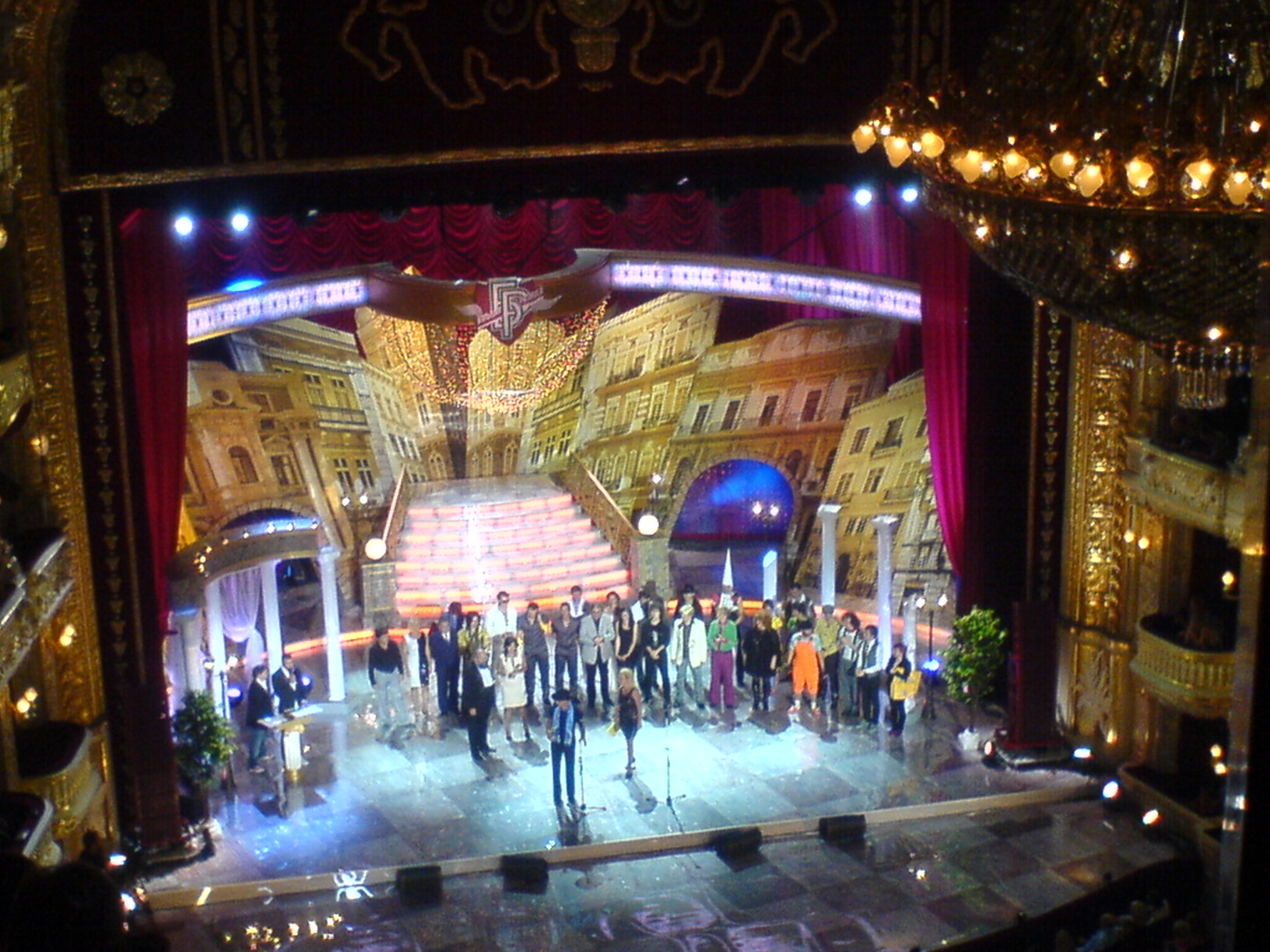
- Created by: Aleksandr Tsekalo; Ruslan Sorokin
- Presented by: Sergey Burunov, Nonna Grishaeva
- Composer: Aleksandr Pushnoy
- Countries of origin: Russia, Ukraine

Production
- Running time: 50 minutes
- Production companies: Krasny Kvadrat / "TechnoStyle" (1 season); Sreda (2—5 season); Juice (from 6 season)

Original release
- Network: Channel One Most popular episodes are repeated on the Friday!.
- Release: 1 January 2008

Big Difference (Russian: Большая разница, romanized: Bolshaya raznitsa) was a Russian parody TV show. Conceptually it is similar to the MADtv show or the German comedy show, Switch. Created by producers Aleksandr Tsekalo and Ruslan Sorokin in 2007. The actors within the project are performing parodies of the most popular Russian and world celebrities, TV programs, movies, etc.

In 2012, the show was rebranded to Big Difference TV and one of the hosts, Ivan Urgant, was contracted by the Russian competing channel TNT to leave the show.

== History ==
The first episode was broadcast on January 1, 2008, on Channel One Russia. Three more episodes were created because of the audience's approval. After hiatus TV show resumed in September 2008. On June 5, 2014, the last episode of the project was released. After 10 years hiatus TV show resumed on 1 January 2024.

=== Hosts ===
- Nonna Grishayeva
- Sergey Burunov

=== Actors ===
- Nonna Grishayeva
- Aleksandr Oleshko
- Sergey Burunov
- Igor Kistol
- Svetlana Galka
- Vladimir Kisarov
- Valentina Rubtsova
- Vyacheslav Manucharov
- Maria Zykova
- Vladimir Zhukov
- Aleksandr Lobanov
- Galina Konshina
- Viktor Andriyenko
- Aleksey Fedotov
- Maria Slastyonkova
- Dmitry Malashenko
- Inga Ilyushina
- Igor Afanasyev
- Andrey Barinov

=== Former actors ===
- Fyodor Dobronravov
- Eduard Radzyukevich
- Mikhail Politseymako
- Olga Medynich

=== Authors ===
- Ruslan Sorokin
- Maxim Tukhanin
- Vitaly Kolomiets
- Alexey Alexandrov
- Alexey Poymanov

== Headings ==
=== Little difference ===
"Little difference" (Russian: Malenkaya raznitsa) is heading, in which little children are performing in the parodies.

Little actors:

- Ivan Chuvatkin
- Yeryoma Cherevko
- Pavel Artyomov
- Yegor Fadeyev

=== Sketch with star ===
"Sketch with star" (Russian: Sketch so zvezdoy) is heading, in which guest stars are playing in sketches together with the actors. Currently named "World history" (Russian: Vsemirnaya istoriya), in which guest stars play different historic figures.

Guest stars:

- Gosha Kutsenko (film actor)
- Mikhail Yefremov (film actor)
- Semyon Slepakov (TV producer)
- Mikhail Trukhin (film actor)
- Ksenia Sobchak (TV presenter)
- Filipp Kirkorov (singer)
- Aleksandr Tsekalo
- Aleksandr Samoylenko (film actor)
- Tatiana Orlova (film actress)

=== Animated painting ===
"Animated painting" (Russian: Ozhivshaya kartina) is heading, in which actors play characters from well-known paintings.

== International editions ==
The Ukrainian version of Big Difference has been produced since January 1, 2010. January 1, 2011 is the expected date for the release of a Belarusian version.
