= Narine Grigoryan =

Armenian actress

- Նարինե Գրիգորյան
- Born: Narine Grigoryan; 14 June 1980 (age 46); Stepanakert, Nagorno-Karabakh Autonomous Oblast, Soviet Union
- Occupation: Actress
- Years active: 2014–present

Narine Grigoryan (Armenian: Նարինե Գրիգորյան born 14 June 1980) is an Armenian actress known for her role in Yeva, the Armenian entry for the Best Foreign Language Film at the 90th Academy Awards. In this film she portrays, a young woman flees to Karabakh with her daughter to escape her in-laws after her husband's death. She also known for her roles in Half Moon Bay (2014), Bravo Virtuoso (2016), The Line 2: 25 Years Later (2017) and Long Return (2017).
