= Sreda (production company) =

Russian television production company

- Founded: 2008
- Founder: Alexander Tsekalo
- Headquarters: Russia

Sreda (Russian: Среда, Environment) is a production company which produces TV programs and serials for Channel One, Russia-1, NTV, Channel 5, TV Centre, REN TV, STS, TV-3, Friday!, also collaborated with the Ukrainian channels Ukraine, Inter, 1+1 and ICTV, the Belarus channel Belarus-1 and the Kazakh channel Channel One Eurasia. It was founded in June 2008 by Alexander Tsekalo after he departed from the post of deputy general director for special projects of the Channel One.

Until March 31, 2014, the company's co-owner was producer Ruslan Sorokin.

It is the first TV company in the history of Russian television to adapt the serial format of the BBC channel (the series The Dark Side of the Moon). In 2016, Sreda adapted another BBC series (Luther), under the title of Klim.

It is also the first Russian television company which managed to sell its series (Silver Spoon) to Netflix. Other series which Netflix acquired from Sreda include The Method, Locust, Fartsa, Territory, and Sparta.

== Filmography ==
- TV series
  - The Dark Side of the Moon (2012)
  - Silver Spoon (2014–present)
  - The Method (2015-present)
  - Fartsa (2015)
  - Locust (2016)
  - Klim (2016)
  - Trotsky (2017)
  - Territory (2018)
  - Sparta (2018)
  - Gogol (film series) (2019)
  - Sherlock in Russia (2020)
  - Trigger (2020-present)
- Films
  - Cinderella (2012)
  - Locust (2015)
- TV shows
  - Big Difference (2008–2014)
  - Prozhektorperiskhilton (2017–present)
