= Artur Janibekyan =

Armenian television producer

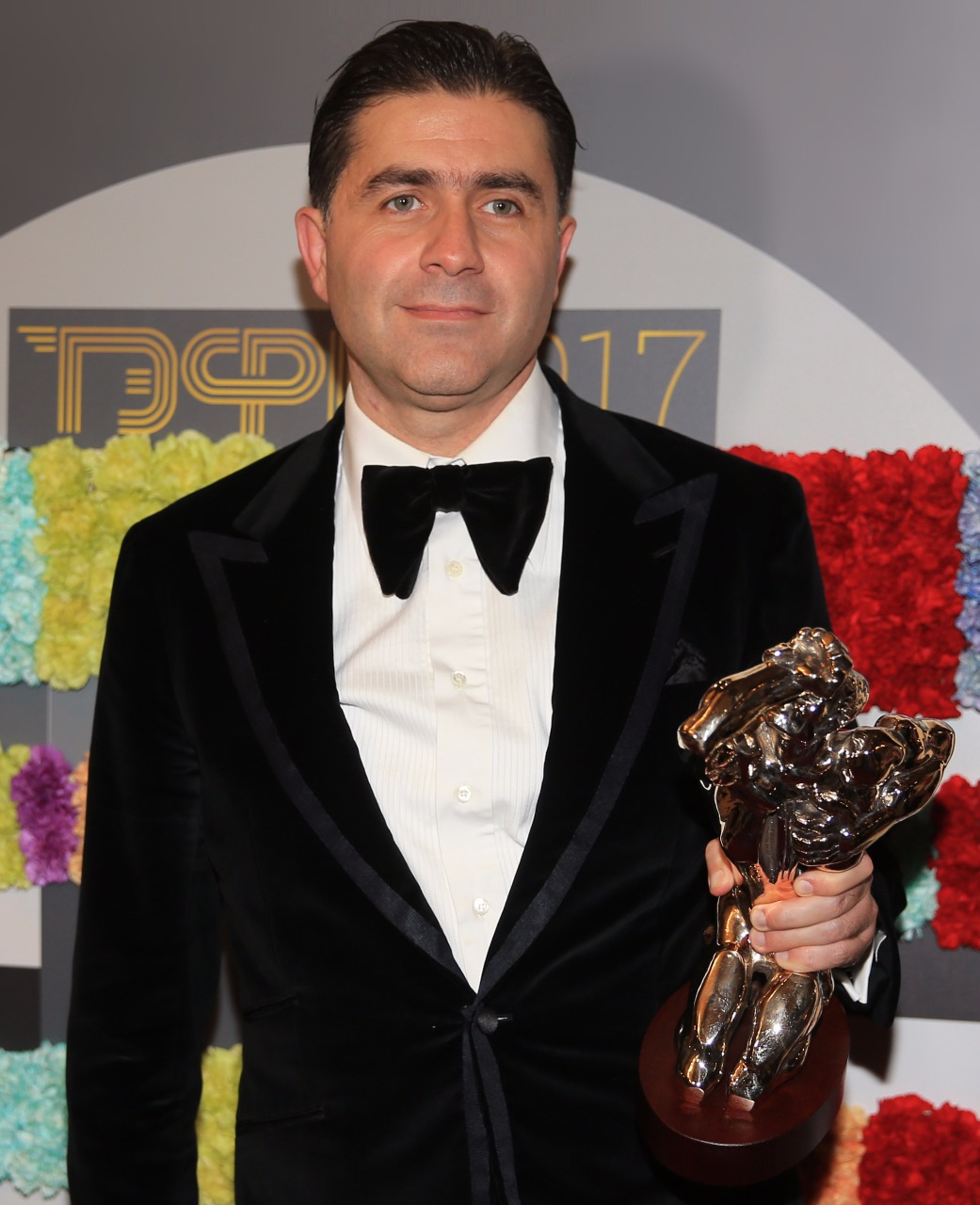
- Citizenship: Armenia
- Occupations: Television Producer and media manager, member of the International Academy of Television Arts “Emmy”, the owner of a lot of Armenian media activities, member of the Armenian National Film Academy․
- Spouse: Elina Janibekyan
- Children: 4
- Parent(s): Otari Akopyan; Ella Akopyan

Artur Janibekyan (Armenian: Արթուր Օթարիի Ջանիբեկյան, Russian: Артур Отариевич Джанибекян) is a founder of Comedy Club Production, television producer and media manager. He is a member of the International Academy of Television Arts Emmy International and a member of the Armenian National Film Academy.

== Professional career ==
From 1993 to 1996, Janibekyan worked as an advertiser, administrator, project coordinator, and film set director for the Sharm company. Since 1994, he has been one of the founders and directors of the New Armenians KVN team who won the 1997 Top KVN League Championship. From 2000 to 2005, he was the producer for the New Armenian Radio program and the producer of Good Evening with Igor Ugolnikov on STS from 2001 to 2002.

=== Comedy Club ===
In 2003, he created the comedy show Comedy Club with his comedy sketch friends. Comedy Club introduced Russian viewers to comedy. Since 2005 Comedy Club has aired on TNT (a Russian TV channel). In 2006, Comedy Club entered the top 10 of the most commercially successful Russian projects (a ninth place with 3.5 million dollars) according to Forbes magazine.
In 2007, he founded the multi-functional producer center Comedy Club Production, where he continues to serve as CEO and general producer. This year GQ magazine (Russia) named Artur Person of the Year in the 'Producer of the Year' category.

In 2008 he launched the 24-hour humor channel Comedy TV.

In November 2009 he opened a chain of restaurants under the name Comedy Café.

He founded 7 Art, the company that produced the popular sitcoms UNI and the TV series The Interns. 7 Art later became a part of Comedy Club Production.

In 2011, the controlling stake in Comedy Club Production was sold to TNT, a popular TV channel in Russia. The stake amounted to 350 million dollars, and was a record sale for the Russian TV.

In 2013, Comedy Club Production took second place in the list of the largest companies producing content for major federal Russian TV channels according to Forbes Magazine.

In March 2015, Janibekyan took charge of the entertainment television group, which included four terrestrial TV channels: TNT, TV-3, Friday! and 2х2. In November, the TV-3 TV channel was relaunched under Artur Janibekyan's management. On January 1, 2016, the new TV channel was launched: TNT-4.

In June 2016, Artur Janibekyan became the General Director of TNT.

In January 2017, the TNT-4 channel became the first federal TV channel to expand its broadcasting reach beyond the country's borders within a year. In May 2017, the Friday! TV channel was launched internationally. The international TV channel versions were created for Russian speakers living abroad and Russian-speaking tourists around the world.

On July 6, 2017, Janibekyan was awarded for "development and effective management, for outstanding achievements in creating entertaining and humorous content".

Janibekyan's TNT team developed and launched the broadcasting of premium TV series that increased the audience share of the TV channel, enabled collecting more precise nationwide audience coverage data, and fought piracy. From September 2017, TNT transitioned to premiere broadcasts on workdays with posting content online immediately after the TV broadcast.

=== Gogol. The Beginning (the mini-series) ===
In 2017, Artur Janibekyan partnered with Valeriy Fedorovich and Evgeniy Nikishov became a producer of the Gogol. The Beginning project – the first mini-series in the world to be widely released in theaters. The mini-series broke even on the day of its premiere and set several box-office records. The production was ranked in the top 10 ten movie theatre releases in 2017. In addition to the CIS, Gogol. The Beginning was released to the United States, UK, Germany, Spain, Austria and Cyprus. Gogol's promotional campaign received several professional awards and diplomas and aroused interest in the professional community during its presentation in Cannes at MIPCOM.

=== House arrest (the series) ===
In 2018, Janibekyan collaborated with Semyon Slepakov and Alexander Dulerain to produce the series House arrest, which was considered the "best series of 2018". House arrest took first place in the top 5 Russian television series, and became an eight-time winner of the VII APKIT Prize. The series was awarded a special prize of the 32nd film awards "Nika" "for creative achievements in the art of television cinema". House arrest”also won the ninth international television Festival "TEFI-Commonwealth" awards.

From 2016 to 2018, projects of TNT, Friday! and TV-3 channels altogether received 19 awards at TEFI in 2016, 2017, 2018 in the Daytime Broadcast and Evening Primetime categories.

In January 2018, the Super TV channel was launched under Janibekyan's management.

In 2019 Artur Janibekyan became a member of the International Academy of Television Arts “Emmy”.

Since 2022, Artur Janibekyan has been actively engaged in producing new unique digital content for digital media and environments.

In March 2023, Artur Janibekyan became a member of the Armenian National Film Academy.

== Personal initiatives and public activity ==
=== “Renaissance” cultural and intellectual foundation ===
Janibekyan helped found the "Renaissance" cultural and intellectual foundation in 2013. It works on preserving, developing and sharing Armenian cultural and intellectual heritage. Its goal is to make the treasures of Armenian culture available to Armenians and others. Modern technologies and new solutions are used to complete the foundation's projects. The foundation has executed many projects, such as the sculptures "The Life of Eternity" and "Men"; the monument to Grigor Narekatsi in the Vatican; contributing to the development the Armenian Wikipedia, the Armenian National Musical Treasury, the Armenian translation of "Khan Academy, the Renaissance of Narekatsi, the Armenian Public Radio’s “Golden Fund”, and the Saroyan House; and supporting the “HIGH FEST” international performing arts festival. The fund also reprinted a number of valuable books, some of which were acquired and deposited at Matenadaran.

=== Other ===
He is a member of the Snob discussion club; he also holds workshops for students of the Skolkovo MBA program.

He founded and sponsored the Ayb Education Foundation, an Armenian educational center comprising a school, a church, a community center, and a kindergarten that combines Armenian education with state-of-the-art educational technologies. He also holds educational masterclasses.

In 2013 he lectured on "Trends in Russian Media" for students at Columbia University.

He produced and sponsored "The Book" (2013), a documentary film directed by V. Mansky.

He supports of Gregory of Narek's ideas and organizes and sponsors all events and activities associated with Narek's name and work in Armenia.

For his devotion to spiritual values and holy grounds in 2013 he was awarded the highest honor of the Armenian Apostolic Church, the Order of St. Gregory the Illuminator.

In 2016 Janibekyan was awarded the first-class medal for "Merit for the Motherland" in Armenia. His name is immortalized in a bas-relief in the Cathedral of the Holy Transfiguration of the Lord of the Armenian Apostolic Church in the city.

In 2016 an open letter "The Future of the Armenian Nation is Decided Now" was published in The New York Times and Hayastani Hanrapetutyun on the initiative of the IDeA Fund, which was timed to the 110th anniversary of the All-Armenian Charitable Union (AGBU). The letter called on individuals, organizations, state and public institutions of Armenia to rethink the future and to join to improve the Armenian people's lifestyle. The letter was signed by Ruben Vardanyan, Noubar Afeyan, Vartan Gregorian, Charles Aznavour, Lord Ara Darzi, Samvel Karapetyan, Janibekyan, and others.

In 2016 Janibekyan co-founded the largest regional startup forum "Sevan Startup Summit" in Armenia. In 2018, the project entered the international arena and was held in the UAE and India under the name "Seaside Startup Summit". In 2019, he co-founded the Seaside Startup Holdings Investment Fund. And since 2019 he has been a speaker of the forum.

In January 2017, Arthur Janibekyan donated to the Cathedral a piece of the relics of Saint Gregory, the Illuminator purchased at one of the auctions in Paris, where relics of Armenian culture were presented.

In 2017, 120 years after the first edition, one of the most important gems of Armenian sacred music, the Sacred Liturgy of Makar Yekmalyan, was released in Yerevan. The liturgy of the classic of Armenian sacred music was republished with new notes and additions thanks to the initiative of the Cultural Revival Foundation and its founder Artur Janibekyan personally.

Since 2017, with the support of the Renaissance Foundation founded by Artur Janibekyan, the Public Radio of Armenia has digitized the unique treasures of the largest Armenian audio archive containing over 100,000 recordings. The project was carried out using modern technologies, which made it possible to significantly improve the quality of the recordings, ensure their long-term preservation, publication and free access to listening. Since 2019, the Golden Fund of the Public Radio of Armenia has been available on the website armradioarchive.am.

Together with the team of the Intellectual Renaissance Foundation, Arthur Janibekyan developed the Saroyan House project, within which the mansion of the American writer and playwright of Armenian origin William Saroyan located in the California city of Fresno was turned into a functioning house-museum, which was solemnly opened to the public in August 2018 - to the 110th anniversary of the birth of the great writer.

Established by Arthur Janibekyan in partnership in 2016, the Startup Armenia Scientific and Educational Foundation successfully implemented a number of projects aimed at developing innovative areas and the start-up industry in the region in subsequent years. Among them are such projects as Coworking Armenia - the first workspace in Armenia for freelancers and start-up entrepreneurs, Startup Club - regional centers for teaching school-age children the basics of entrepreneurship for the peripheral regions of Armenia, Startup School - a business school with a unique program for high school students, Drone Edu Lab - a school of robotics and programming for school children. Children and teenagers from Armenia and abroad take part in the projects and programs of the foundation.

Artur Janibekyan is one of the founders of the Startup School established to develop and promote business thinking among school-age children in Armenia. In July–August 2021, he sponsored the organization of events and personal speeches by business coaches for project participants. In December 2021, he took part in SSSholidays, an annual international startup conference in the United Arab Emirates and India. He is a co-founder and investor of the Triple S (3S) venture capital fund based on the Seaside Startup Summit in the United States of America. The main focus of this fund is aimed at the development and support of innovative technology industries: artificial intelligence, security and others.

In 2024, Arthur Janibekyan headed the opening of the Seaside Startup Summit UAE 2024, which was held in Ras Al Khaimah under the esteemed patronage of His Highness Sheikh Saud bin Saqr Al Qasimi, Supreme Council member and Ruler of Ras Al Khaimah. The summit featured over 100 startups, 100 mentors, and companies from the MENA region, creating a fertile ground for collaboration and innovation. The winning teams had the chance to secure investments․ Additionally, a pivotal agreement was forged with the UAE government, outlining plans for the organization of two Seaside Startup Summits annually for the next five years in the MENA region.

== Family and personal life ==
Janibekyan was born to father Otari Akopyan, a top-level political party member during the Soviet regime, and mother Ella Akopyan, a dentist. He has a sister, Lilit Akopyan. He is married to Elina Janibekyan, and they have four children: three sons, Narek, Aram, and Areg; and one daughter, Eva.

== Projects ==
=== TV ===
TV show producer:

- Comedy Club (2005, TNT )
- Nasha Russia (2006, TNT)
- Celebrities against Karaoke (2006, TNT)
- Beshenl Geographic (2007, TNT)
- No-Rules Laughing (2007, TNT)
- The Smash League (2007, TNT)
- The Smash Night (2008, TNT)
- Comedy Woman (2008, TNT)
- Univer (2008, TNT)
- Show News (2008, TNT)
- Dom-2 (2009, TNT)
- The Smash Evening (2009, TNT)
- Two Antons (2009, TNT)
- Proverb Busters (2010, DTV)
- New Comedy Club (2010, TNT)
- The Ideal Man (2010, STS)
- Comedy Battle (2010, TNT)
- Nezlobin and Gudkov (2010, MTV)
- The Interns (2010, TNT)
- Univer. New Dorm (2011, TNT)
- Comedy Club in Jūrmala (2013, 2014, TNT)
- SashaTanya (2013, TNT)
- KhB (2013, TNT)
- Nezlob (2013, TNT)
- Stand Up (2013, TNT)
- No sleep! (2014, TNT)
- What a morning! (2014, TNT)
- Danc-off (2014, TNT)
- Once upon a time in Russia (2014, TNT)
- Adulteries (2015, TNT)
- Show of improvisations (2015, TNT)
- Where's the logic? (2015, TNT)
- Hot and bothered (2015, TNT)
- Borodach. To understand and forgive (2016, TNT)
- Open microphone (2017, ТНТ)
- Love is... (2017, TNT)
- Soyuz Studio (2017, TNT)
- Money or infamy (2017, TNT4)
- Songs (2018)
- Big Breakfast (2018)
- Comedian in the city (2018)
- Marry Buzova (2018)
- Prozharka (2018)
- Home Arrest (2018)
- Year of Culture (2018)
- Beetles (2019)
- Plan B (2019)
- The Triad (2019)
- Two Damsels are Broke (2019, Friday!)
- Sing Without Rules (2020)
- Two in a Million (2020)
- Secret (2020)
- TALK (2020)
- You Like Me (2020)
- TEAM Improvisation (2020)
- Hussar (2020)
- Women Stand Up (2020)
- New Morning (2020)
- Battle With Girls (2020, Friday!)
- We Need to Talk Seriously (2020)
- Musical Intuition (2021)
- Girls with Makarov (2021)
- Bachelor 8th season (2021)
- I don't Believe you (2021)
- New Dances (2021)
- The Big Country Show (2021)
- THE GAME (2021)
- Lab with Anton Belyaev (2021)
- Univer. 10 years later (2021)
- Triad, season 2 (2021)
- Yazhotets (2021)
- Sveta from the Other World 2 (2021)
- Stas (2022)
- Girls with Makarov 2 (2022)
- Bachelor, season 9 (2022)
- Year of Culture 2 (2022)
- Sister (2022, Friday!)
- Family (2022)

=== Film ===
- The Best Movie (2008)
- The Best Movie 2 (2009)
- Our Russia. The Balls of Fate (2010)
- The Best Movie 3 (2011)
- The Parrot Club (2014)
- The Book (2014)
- Gogol. The Beginning (2017)
- Zomboyashik (2017)
- Gogol. Viy (2018)
