= House Arrest (Russian TV series) =

- Домашний арест
- Genre: Comedy drama Political satire
- Created by: Semyon Slepakov
- Written by: Semyon Slepakov; Maxim Tukhanin
- Directed by: Pyotr Buslov
- Starring: Pavel Derevyanko; Aleksandr Robak; Anna Ukolova; Sergey Burunov; Marina Aleksandrova
- Country of origin: Russia
- Original language: Russian
- No. of seasons: 1
- No. of episodes: 12

Production
- Executive producers: Andrey Levin; Taimuraz Badziev
- Producers: Semyon Slepakov; Alexander Dulerayn; Vyacheslav Dusmukhametov; Artur Janibekyan
- Running time: 67-86 minutes
- Production company: Comedy Club Production

Original release
- Network: Premier; TNT
- Release: 16 August – 25 October 2018

House Arrest (Russian: Домашний арест, romanized: Domashniy arest) is a Russian political comedy television series, broadcast on Premier streaming service in 2018 and on TNT television channel in 2020.

== Plot ==
Arkady Anikeev, the mayor of Sineozersk (lit. Blue Lake Town), a small town in the interior of Russia, gets arrested by the federal investigative service on bribery charges. Until the start of his trial, the town court sentences him to house arrest, but in his childhood home rather than his luxurious mansion. His wife has abandoned him, as all property was registered in her name. Once in the communal apartment, Arkady runs into Ivan Samsonov, who was a neighbor of his in the same apartment block during their childhood and used to bully him. Despite their differences, Arkady decides to assist Samsonov in becoming the new mayor of Sineozersk in order to help remove all charges against himself.

== Cast ==
- Pavel Derevyanko as Arkady Anikeev, ex-mayor of Sineozersk on house arrest
- Aleksandr Robak as Ivan "Samson" Samsonov, an excavator driver and Arkady's neighbor who becomes a mayoral candidate
- Anna Ukolova as Nina Samsonova, a nurse and wife to Ivan
- Sergey Burunov as Pavel Osipenko, deputy mayor of Sineozersk who becomes acting mayor and mayoral candidate after Arkady's arrest
- Marina Aleksandrova as Marina Bylinkina, associate professor of history and opposition opinion journalist
- Egor Klinaev as Slava Samsonov, Ivan's teenage son
- Yuliya Sorokina as Yulya Samsonova, Ivan's teenage daughter
- Olesya Sudzilovskaya as Viktoria Anikeeva, Arkady's wife
- Yana Koshkina as Lyolya, Arkady's and Pavel's mistress
- Albina Tikhanova as Klavdia Saprykina, Arkady's elderly communist neighbor and a sassy gossiper
- Vladimir Simonov as Eduard Kargopolov, rector of the University of Sineozersk and Marina's lover
- Roman Pogorelov as Alexey Bylinkin, Marina's disabled son
- Yola Sanko as Arkady's grandmother (appears in flashbacks)
- Dmitry and Vadim Smirnov as Vitaly and Valery Smirnitsky, Arkady's twin bodyguards
- Roman Madyanov as Viktor, the governor
- Dmitry Lysenkov as Captain Vsevolod Zavarzin, a Federal Security Service officer from Moscow
- Anatoly Kot as Major Anatoly Lavrov, a Federal Security Service officer from Moscow
- Gosha Kutsenko as General Georgy Kruglov of Federal Security Service
- Igor Savochkin as Mikhail, the head of Federal Security Service directorate for Sineozersk
- Artyom Bobtsov as Lieutenant Lev Sokolov, Mikhail's nephew who works for the Federal Security Service archive
- Dmitry Astrakhan as Andrey Mishkin, Arkady's lawyer from Moscow
- Timofey Tribuntsev as Daniil Golovkin, Arkady's stuttering public defender
- Aleksandr Nazarov as Ilya Berg, chief judge of the Sineozersk Town Court
- Svetlana Khodchenkova as Ilona Radchenko, a campaign manager from Moscow and a former stripper
- Lev Leshchenko as himself
- Aleksandr Bashirov as Grigory, a debt collector / Father Gregory, a parson of the Sineozersk Monastery in 12th century
- Dmitry Karanevsky as Konstantin, Grigory's nephew and a debt collector / a young monk at the Sineozersk Monastery in 12th century
- Irina Pegova as Tatyana, a woman of easy kind who works in a local shop
- Pyotr Buslov as Pyotr Tretyakov, presidential envoy

== Production ==
- The TV series was announced on October 22, 15.
- The pilot episode was directed by a different director (Egor Baranov instead of Pyotr Buslov) and contented different cast. For example, Viktoria's character was portrayed by Elena Korikova instead of Olesya Sudzilovskaya.
- The main character, mayor Arkady, could have been played by Fyodor Bondarchuk.
- The filming took place in Yaroslavl, Podolsk, and Moscow.
- The original soundtrack for the TV series was composed by a French Oscar-Winning composer Ludovic Bource.
- The animated intro was created by an Oscar-Winning animator Aleksandr Petrov, and the closing credits were designed by Art. Lebedev Studio.

== Awards ==
The series received the 2019 Nika Special Prize, received by Semyon Slepakov and Pyotr Buslov, and the 2019 Golden Eagle Award for the best TV actor (Pavel Derevyanko).
