= Alexey Lyaporov =

- Born: April 19, 1979 (age 46); Pyatigorsk, Soviet Union
- Occupations: Creative producer, author

Alexey Vasilyevich Lyaporov (Russian: Алексей Васильевич Ляпоров, born 19 April 1979 in Pyatigorsk, Stavropol Krai) is a creative producer of Comedy Club TV show on TNT channel (since 2012), a former member and author of the “Pyatigorsk” KVN team, one of the screenwriters of the iconic sketch comedy show "Nasha Russia" and the film "Our Russia. The Balls of Fate".

== Biography ==
Since 2000 Alexey was an author and member of the “Pyatigorsk” KVN team. In 2004, the Team became the champion of the KVN Top League of Russia. In 2006, he became a Comedy Club script writer. In 2008 he became an editor, since 2012 – a creative producer of the show. From 2006 to 2011 Alexey was one of the screenwriters of the iconic sketch comedy "Nasha Russia". In 2008, he was also one of the screenwriters of the feature film "Our Russia. The Balls of Fate". In 2014, 2016, 2018 and 2021 he was one of the authors of Pavel Volya's solo concerts "Big Stand Up".

== Awards ==
=== For the Comedy Club project ===
- TEFI Award in the category "Humorous program" (2017).

== Personal life ==
Married. Has four children.
