= Garik Kharlamov =

Russian actor (born 1981)

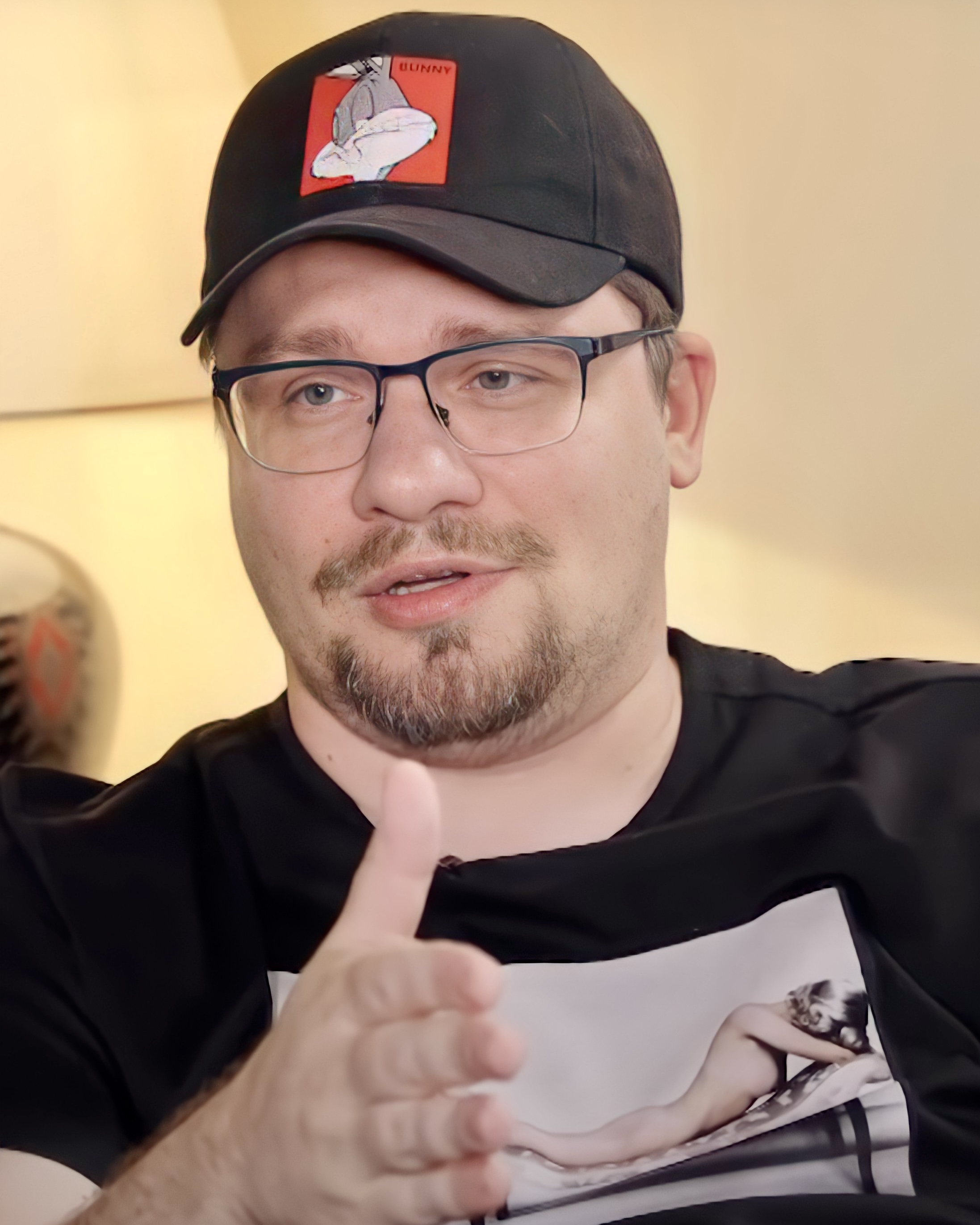
- Born: Andrey Yuryevich Kharlamov; February 28, 1981 (age 45); Moscow, Soviet Union
- Citizenship: Russia
- Occupations: Actor, television presenter, comedian, singer, film producer, television producer, showman, youtuber
- Years active: 2004–present
- Spouse(s): Yulia Leshchenko (m. 2010; div. 2013) Kristina Asmus (m. 2013; div. 2020) Yekaterina Kovalchuk (m. 2024)
- Awards: MTV Russia Movie Awards (2008)

Igor Yuryevich Kharlamov (Russian: Игорь Юрьевич Харламов, born February 28, 1981), known professionally as Garik Kharlamov (Russian: Гарик Харламов) is a Russian film, television, and voice actor, comedian, television presenter, singer, and producer. He is best known as the long-time resident, co-host, and creative producer of the Comedy Club show on TNT channel.

== Biography ==
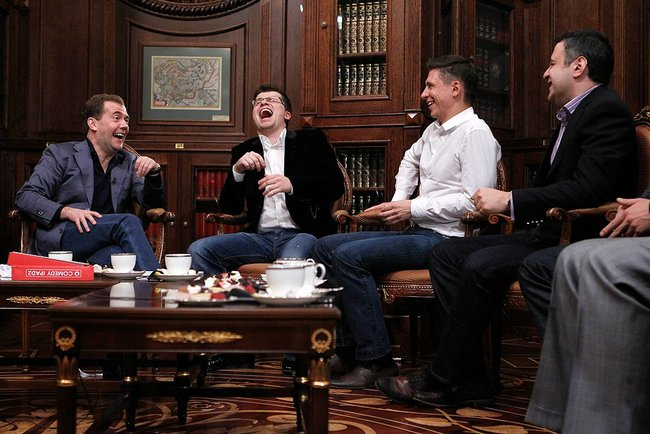
Kharlamov (second from the left) meeting with Russian president Dmitry Medvedev among other residents of the Comedy Club, 2011

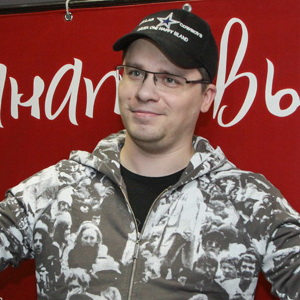
Kharlamov in 2013

Born Andrey, he had his name changed to Igor at three months as a tribute to his late grandfather. In the 1990s, when Kharlamov was still a teenager, his parents divorced. He emigrated to the United States with his father. At the age of 14 in Chicago, Kharlamov studied acting under Billy Zane. He also worked part-time selling cell phones and as a cashier at McDonald's. Kharlamov returned to Russia in 1999.

He graduated from the State University of Management with a degree in human resource management. During his university years, he gained his first fame by participating in KVN.

He has worked for several Russian television channels, including Muz-TV, TNT, STS, and NTV. A permanent resident of the Comedy Club, Kharlamov replaced Garik Martirosyan as the show's co-host in 2015, and became its creative producer in 2024.

Despite having been a trusted person of Vladimir Putin during his 2012 and 2018 presidential campaigns, Kharlamov condemned the 2022 Russian invasion of Ukraine. However, he still got on the Ukraine's sanctions list for "calling publicly for a war of aggression, excusing and legitimizing Russia's armed aggression against Ukraine and temporary occupation of Ukrainian territories.

== Personal life ==
From 2013 to 2020, Kharlamov was married to actress Kristina Asmus. They have a daughter together.

Kharlamov supports PFC CSKA Moscow.

== Selected filmography ==
- The Best Movie (2008)
- The Best Movie 2 (2009)
- The Best Movie 3-De (2011)
- Univer. New Dorm (2014)
- Interns (2015)
- Bender: The Beginning (2021)
- What Men Talk About. Simple Pleasures (2023)

=== Voice roles ===
- Alisa Knows What to Do! (2012)
- The Snow Queen 2 (2015)
- The Last Warrior: Root of Evil (2021)
- The Last Warrior: A Messenger of Darkness (2021)
- Prostokvashino (2024)

=== Russian dubbing ===
- Legends of Oz: Dorothy's Return (2013) (Martin Short)
- The Lego Movie (2014) (Nick Offerman)
- Jungle Shuffle (2014) (Drake Bell)
- Suburbicon (2017) (Matt Damon)
- Show Dogs (2018) (Ludacris)
- The Secret Life of Pets 2 (2019) (Nick Kroll)
- The Canterville Ghost (2023) (Stephen Fry)
- Peter Five Eight (2024) (Kevin Spacey)
