= Hooked (Artur Pirozhkov song) =

"Зацепила"

Single by Artur Pirozhkov
- Language: Russian
- English title: Hooked
- Released: March 6, 2019
- Genre: Pop; Deep House
- Length: 3:39
- Label: Warner Music Russia

"Hooked" (Russian: "Зацепила") is a song by Russian singer Aleksandr Revva, released on 6 March 2019 through the label Warner Music Russia under the pseudonym Artur Pirozhkov. The author for the lyrics and music for the song is Denis Kovalskiy.

== Awards & Nominations ==
Year	Platform	Nomination	Result	Ref.
2019	RU.TV 2019	Best song	Nominated	
2019	RU.TV 2019	Stars of the dancefloor	Won	

== Music video ==
The music video for the song was released on 6 March 2019, simultaneously with the launch of the single. The video received its first 10 million views two weeks after its release, and two months later, the number of views on YouTube reached 50 million. In less than five months, the video was viewed over 100 million times.
