= Aleksandr Revva =

Ukrainian-Russian comedian (born 1974)

- Александр Ревва
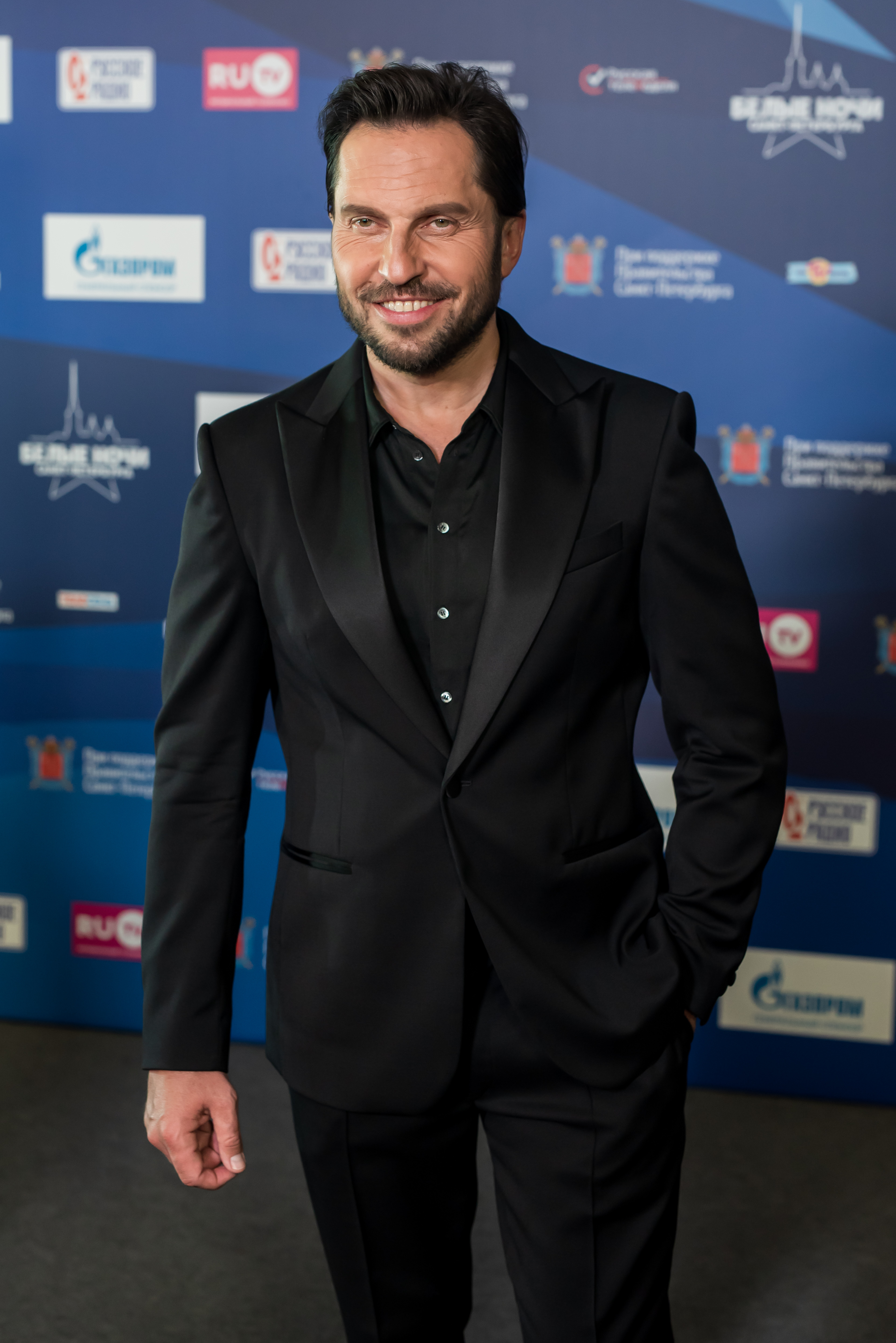
- Revva in 2021
- Born: Aleksandr Vladimirovich Revva; 10 September 1974 (age 51); Donetsk, Ukrainian SSR, Soviet Union
- Other name: Arthur Pirozhkov
- Citizenship: Ukraine, Russia
- Occupations: Actor, TV presenter, singer, lyricist
- Years active: 1995 (KVN); 2005–present (actor)
- Musical career
- Genres: Russian pop
- Instruments: singing
- Label: Warner Music Russia

Aleksandr Vladimirovich Revva (Russian: Александр Владимирович Ревва; Ukrainian: Олександр Володимирович Ревва, romanized: Oleksandr Volodymyrovych Revva; born 10 September 1974), better known by his stage name Arthur Pirozhkov (Russian: Артур Владимирович Пирожков), is a Russian stand-up comedian, TV host and voice actor of Ukrainian origin. A former KVN player, in 2006 Revva became a "resident" of the Russian Comedy Club show.

== Early life ==
Aleksandr Revva was born in Donetsk, Ukrainian SSR. According to his own statement, announced in the program "Пока Все Дома" (While Everyone's Home), "Revva" is not his original surname. His family, who lived in Estonia and used the name Erwa, immigrated to Ukraine, where he changed his name to Revva. He graduated from the College of Industrial Automation, then the Faculty of Management of the Donetsk State University of Management. He worked as an electrical mechanic at a mine.

Since 1995, he has been a member of the KVN team "Don State Agrarian University" from Donetsk and, since 2000, a member of the KVN team "Burnt by the Sun". As a KVN player, Revva performed alongside his teammate, Mikhail Galustyan.

== Television career ==
From 2006 to 2013, he was president of the Moscow «Comedy Club». In 2013 he was a host of the show «Repeat!». In 2015, he returned to the television show. In «Comedy Club», he performs acts with Timur Batrutdinov, Garik Martirosyan, Andrei Rozhkov, and Garik Kharlamov.

With Andrey Rozhkov, he led the program NTV "You're Funny!" Under the pseudonym Arthur Pirozhkov. December 25, 2010, the opening of the joint project of the restaurateur Dmitry Orlinsky and Aleksandr Revva - «Spaghetteria», has settled into a two-story house near Tver ulitsy. November 3, 2013, to January 26, 2014, led by the Channel One show "Repeat!". From March 3 to May 26, 2014, Revva was one of the judges of the First TV channel, "One to one!". He is currently the producer of the animated series "Kolobanga," which was withdrawn in Orsk, Orenburg Oblast. The series is scheduled for release by the end of 2014 on the channel STS.

== Music career ==
In 2009, Revva started releasing music under his Arthur Pirozhkov pseudonym. His songs, combining comedic elements with catchy tunes, became very popular, and as of 2022 he is considered one of the most popular Russian pop stars.

== Civic position ==
Later, he changed his mind about condemning the war in eastern Ukraine, returned to Russia and started working there again (he appeared for New Year's shows).

== Personal life ==
Revva is husband to Angelika; their daughters are Alisa and Ameli.

While Alexandr Revva was critical of the 2022 Russian invasion of Ukraine, his father (who still lived in Donetsk) supported Putin and the invasion, which led to a conflict between the two.

== Filmography ==
=== Actor ===
- 2005 Comedy Club (TV Series)
- 2008 Yeralash (TV show) as Robot teacher
- 2008 The Tale of Soldier Fedot, The Daring Fellow as Baba Yaga (voice)
- 2008 Adventures of Alenushka and Erema as Voevoda Gordey (voice)
- 2009 The New Adventures of Alenushka and Erema as Voevoda Gordei / Hedgehog / Horse (voice)
- 2011 Yeralash (TV show) as psychologist
- 2011–2014 Zaytsev+1 (TV Series) as Sergei Mavrodi
- 2012 Rzhevsky Versus Napoleon as groom
- 2013 Understudy as Igor Uspensky / Mikhail Vladlenovich Stasov / Sebastian Ullenovich Vasilkov
- 2013 Odnoklassniki: CLICK for Luck as Bum
- 2014 Russian: Лёгок на помине as boatman Lenya
- 2014 Mixed feelings as Phil
- 2014 Parrot Club (TV) as Chaykin (voice)
- 2015 Bet on love – poker player
- 2016 Magic Cup Rorrima Bo 3D as Brazembeld
- 2016 Day all lovers
- 2016 Bet on Love as Dyadya Leon
- 2016 Son wolverines
- 2017 Naughty Grandma as Sanya Rubenstein
- 2017 Kolobanga as a grandmother (voice)
- 2017 Yana+Yanko as Zhenya
- 2021 Till Lindemann – Ich hasse Kinder (The Short Movie) as a policeman Mikhail Korepin

=== Producer ===
- 2010 The Devil's Flower

=== Singles ===
- 2009 – «Пэрэдайс» Paradise
- 2010 – «Революция» "Revolution" (with Quest Pistols)
- 2011 – «Плачь, детка» Cry baby
- 2012 – «Я не умею танцевать» I can't dance
- 2012 – «Лучший спорт» The best sport
- 2012 – «Красивая песня» Beautiful song
- 2013 – «Я-Звезда» I am a Star
- 2014 – «Luna» Luna (featuring Vera Brezhneva)
- 2014 – «Не плачь, девчонка» Don't cry babe
- 2015 – «На лету лето» Summer on the fly
- 2016 – «Я буду помнить» I will remember
- 2016 – «#КакЧелентано» #Like Celentano
- 2017 – «Либо Любовь» Either love
- 2018 – «Я не Андрей» I'm not Andrey
- 2018 – «Чика» Chika
- 2018 – «Запутался» Confused
- 2019 – «Моя Богиня» My goddess (featuring Doni)
- 2019 – «Зацепила»" She hooked me
- 2019 – «Алкоголичка» Alcoholic lady
- 2019 – «Она решила сдаться» She decided to surrender
- 2020 – «Летим со мной» Let's fly with me
- 2020 – «Перетанцуй меня» "Outdance me"
- 2020 – «Перетанцуй меня Remix (with DJ Nejtrino)»
- 2020 – «#туДЫМ-сюДЫМ» #Hither-and-thither
- 2021 — «#туДЫМ-сюДым Remix (with DJ Nejtrino)»
- 2021 – "Dancing All Through the Night"
- 2021 – «Деньги» Money
- 2021 – «Деньги» Remix (with DJ Leo Burn)
- 2021 – «Летом на фиесте» Summer at the fiesta
- 2021 – «Задыхаюсь» Suffocating (cover of a song by Dima Bilan)
- 2021 – «Хочешь» Do you want (featuring Klava Koka)
- 2022 — «Красивое тело» Beautiful body
