= The Best Movie =

2008 film by Kirill Kuzin

- Directed by: Kirill Kuzin
- Written by: Artak Gasparyan; Garik Kharlamov; Artur Tumasyan
- Produced by: Artak Gasparyan; Garic Kharlamov; Alexander Dulerayn
- Starring: Garic Kharlamov; Mikhail Galustyan; Pavel Volya
- Cinematography: Sergey Danduryan; Ulugbeck Khamraev
- Edited by: Pavel Andryushenko
- Music by: Yuri Poteenko
- Release date: January 24, 2008
- Running time: 115 min.
- Country: Russia
- Language: Russian
- Budget: $10 million
- Box office: $30.5 million

The Best Movie (Russian: Самый лучший фильм, Samy luchshiy film) is a 2008 Russian comedy film from TNT and Comedy Club Russia, spoofing such famous Russian films as Night Watch and Day Watch, The 9th Company, Heat and TV series: My Fair Nanny, Dalnoboyshchiki and Brigada. The movie includes numerous cameos by Russian celebrities, some of them involving a humorous touch on their public image. For instance, socialite Kseniya Sobchak appears as a luxury prostitute, and gay icon Boris Moiseev plays a rough-and-tumble policeman, his only line being: "You gonna sign it all, you faggot!"

== Plot ==
During his wedding to his fiancée Nastya, Vadik Volnov smokes a joint, offered by his friend "Half-Kilo." This leads him to experience clinical death, transporting him to the afterlife, where he meets God’s secretary (whom he initially mistakes for God) and they begin discussing Vadik's life. Vadik recalls memories from his childhood, such as drinking with his father, Grigory, during a Soviet hockey match and his youthful pursuits in sports.

As he grows older, Vadik serves in a military training unit where he and his friends Lyuty, Sparrow, and Joconda are sent to the 10th company for misconduct. Here, they encounter a peculiar officer, Sgt. Khokhol, dressed in a Dolce & Gabbana vest, who retaliates against Vadik for joking about his last name. Later, Vadik reflects on his experiences in the 1990s, including a botched robbery attempt at a jewelry market and a failed scheme to steal Lenin’s body from the Mausoleum. Following a stint in jail, Vadik and his friends rise as small-time crime bosses, earning the nickname "The Three Scoundrels." The group’s antics continue, involving confrontations with competitors, run-ins with police while intoxicated, and a wild chase after a banker that ends with Vadik being knocked unconscious by his own friend.

Later, Vadik meets Nastya, the daughter of a man he once assaulted. Despite her father’s initial objections, Vadik and Nastya start a relationship, but this is interrupted when Nastya is duped by her idol, the singer Tim Milan, into a shady film project. Vadik comes to her rescue, reconciling with her after a confrontation. In his plea to God’s secretary, Vadik asks to be returned to Earth and recounts several good deeds, but the secretary tells him that God was preoccupied with His son’s birthday that day (Christmas). Ultimately, Vadik wakes up from what appears to have been a dream, only to repeat his actions, falling back in a stupor at the wedding after another smoke. The film concludes with Vadik and Nastya strolling through Moscow during the credits.

== Cast ==
- Garik Kharlamov — Vadik
- Mikhail Galustyan — Polkilo
- Elena Velikanova — Nastya
- Armen Dzhigarkhanyan — God's secretary
- Pavel Volya — Tima Milan (parody of Dima Bilan)
- Valery Barinov — Nastya's father
- Iosif Buyanovsky — Lyalya
- Dmitry Nagiev — Drill Sergeant
- Dmitry Sychyov — Himself
- Boris Moiseev — Mаjor

== Box office ==
Supported by an omnipresent marketing campaign, the film grossed 403 Mil. roubles on its opening weekend in Russia. From Russia and the CIS combined, it earned $16.5 million, breaking the opening-weekend record. This record was first surpassed by Avatar, although the film still holds the opening-weekend record for Russian films.

== Sequels ==
The film was followed by the sequels The Best Movie 2 and The Best Movie 3.
