= Plato (film) =

- Directed by: Vartan Akopyan
- Written by: Ametkhan Magomedov; Vartan Akopyan
- Produced by: Armen Adilkhanyan; Armen Manasaryan
- Starring: Pavel Volya; Elizaveta Lotova
- Cinematography: Vaagn Ter-Akopyan
- Music by: Arto Tunçboyacıyan
- Production companies: Python; Paradise
- Release date: June 2008 (Moscow Film Festival)
- Running time: 90 minutes
- Country: Russia
- Language: Russian
- Budget: $2.5 million
- Box office: $5 141 876

Plato (Russian: Платон) is a 2008 Russian drama film directed by Vartan Akopyan.

== Plot ==
Fashionable metropolitan party-goer, "seller of happiness" Plato, earns money by finding the most beautiful girls in Russia on all sorts of castings and offers them to rich people who are willing to pay a large sum of money for a girl. Due to his attractive appearance and outstanding intellectual abilities, Plato always achieves his goal, until one day he meets Lyuba, a saleswoman in a fashion store. A romance develops between them but one of the most important clients of Plato, oligarch Abdul, asks him to arrange a meeting with Lyuba. Plato offers Lyuba a deal – both in order to make money and to satisfy Abdul, and she accepts. Lyuba's meeting with Abdul takes place where she sets her condition - the murder of one person, namely, Plato. Abdul agrees to satisfy this whim of the girl, but later Lyuba disowns this idea. Lyuba marries Abdul, becomes one of his wives and moves to his house in London.

Plato continues to do his job, wheeling the city in search of promising girls, but can not forget Lyuba. And one day he decides to find Abdul and goes to visit him, where he finds Lyuba, who is perfectly happy and does have any romantic feelings for him.

== Cast ==
- Pavel Volya — Plato
- Elizaveta Lotova — Lyuba
- Evelyn Bledans — Ellochka
- Olegar Fedoro — man
- Stanislav Bondarenko — Banderas
- Ksenia Knyazeva — Nastya
- Alexander Lymarev — Anton
- Mukhtar Gusengadzhiev — Abdul
- Alexei Grishin is an oligarch
- Patimat Davydova — Patimat
- Oleg Kamenshchikov — Pit Bull
- Ekaterina Strogova — a girl from Bryansk
- Olga Smirnova — a girl from Bryansk
