= TNT (Russian TV channel) =

Russian federal television channel

TNT ТНТ
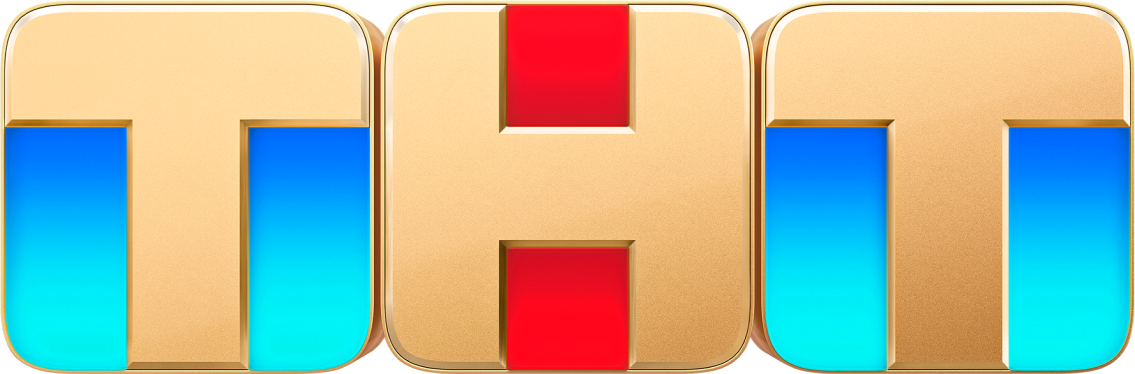
- Logo from 2022
- Country: Russia
- Broadcast area: International
- Headquarters: Moscow

Programming
- Language: Russian
- Picture format: HDTV 1080i

Ownership
- Owner: Gazprom Media

History
- Launched: 1 January 1998

Links
- Website: tnt-online.ru

Availability

Terrestrial
- Digital terrestrial television: Channel 19

TNT (Russian: ТНТ, Твоё Новое Телевидение, romanized: Tvoyo Novoe Televidenie, lit. 'Your New Television') (Russian: Телевидение нового тысячелетия, romanized: Televidenie Novogo Tisyacheletiya, lit. 'Television of the New Millennium') is a Russian federal TV channel founded in 1997, and is considered one of the five most-popular TV channels in Russia. At the beginning of 2012, it reached more than 104 million people.

Although its target audience is viewers 14 to 44 years old, its core demographic is ages 18 to 30. The channel focuses on entertainment, particularly comedy series. Since 2001 it has been a member of the Gazprom-Media, the flagship TV channel of Gazprom-Media Entertainment TV (founded in 2015).

TNT's main source of income is advertisements. It has regional TV stations and regional partners, who receive advertising time on the channel. The channel delivers its signal via satellites in four orbits, which allow its 27 television stations to receive it in their corresponding time zones. The signal is received and redistributed by local stations broadcasting in most large cities and 5,900 smaller communities in the Russian Federation.

TNT reserves the rights to all original shows and owns two of Russia's largest production companies: Comedy Club Production and Good Story Media. It also has exclusive contracts with a number of Russian showrunners. Since 2016, TNT has been directed by Artur Janibekyan (head of Gazprom-Media Entertainment TV). In February 2022, Tina Kandelaki was named channel`s interim CEO as a substitute for Roman Petrenko, the new adviser to Gazprom-Media CEO.

== History ==
=== Founding ===
TNT was founded in September 1997 as part of the Media-Most holding company. Its general director was Sergei Skvortsov, appointed by Media-Most first deputy chairman Igor Malashenko (who had launched World war, Russia's first non-state TV network, a year before). The new channel initially focused on regional viewers.

Designed to provide family entertainment, its goal was to attract the widest possible audience. TNT broadcast feature films, documentaries, series (including soap operas), talk and game shows, videos of Russian and foreign musicians, musical programs (including concerts by bardic musicians), comedy, news, children's entertainment and educational programs, and cartoons. Within its first five years, sports programs were also frequently shown. The NTV Plus satellite service participated in the channel's founding.

TNT was intended to compete with STS and NTV, presenting little-known videos from European and American companies. Streets of Broken Lights was a long-running series about the everyday life of the Russian police.

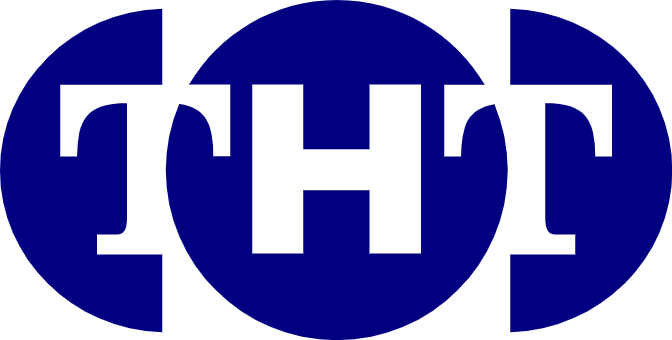
Logo used from 1998 to 2002

The channel is delivered via Intelsat 604 (60° E) for European Russia in digital format and Intelsat 704 (64° E) for eastern Russia; the latter used an analog format for its first six months. On January 1, 1998, TNT began broadcasting. In Moscow, it operated on UHF channel 35, which had been used in 1996-1997 by the VGTRK-owned Meteor-Sport, Russia's first (and failed) sports channel, whose frequency was acquired by Media-Most in the summer of 1997 to broadcast an experimental service without a definitive format.

=== 1998–1999 ===
Streets of Broken Lights gave TNT a stable but comparatively small (2–3 percent) audience during its first year of broadcasting. By mid-1998, the channel could be seen in 100 Russian cities. Inspired by Broken Lights' success, channel executives ordered another series: National Security Agent, about the adventures of an FSB agent. It premiered on January 1, 1999, but failed to duplicate the first series' success. In March 1999, Sergei Skvortsov left NTV-Holding and Pavel Korchagin became TNT's general director.

The channel had a production system for its own series and a talk show with Vladimir Solovyov (a newcomer to television), and presented television premieres of blockbuster films. It was apolitical, there was no clear concept, its target audience was not defined, and its management assigned no special tasks; therefore, its development was unlikely. In 1999, TNT received two TEFI awards for the first season of Broken Lights (for television feature film or series and television project of the year) and finished eighth in the rating with 3.2 percent of the audience. The audience for STS, its main competitor, was twice as large.

=== 2000–2001 ===
In June 2000, TNT began a news program in the Moscow region. Today in the Capital was produced by NTV and, according to Skvortsov, was intended for broadcast throughout Russia: "Our city's news will be interesting in any city". Its staff consisted of young NTV correspondents and students and recent graduates of the MSU Faculty of Journalism.

On August 27, 2000, after a fire at the Ostankino Tower, TNT was one of the few channels which remained on the air and temporarily allocated part of its airtime to NTV channel for its news program Today. At this time, TNT ranked fourth among Moscow TV channels.

In 2000–2001, the channel and its Media-Most parent (which also owned NTV, NTV Plus, and the publisher Seven Days) were on the brink of liquidation. During the spring of 2001, while NTV ownership was changing, TNT broadcast NTV programs. After the seizure and redistribution of NTV, most of its journalists moved to TNT until Boris Berezovsky proposed Yevgeny Kiselyov to head TV-6. After some of its journalists moved to TV-6, TNT changed directors; Pavel Korchagin went to TV-6, and Andrey Skutin became general director. In November 2001, TNT became part of Gazprom-Media.

=== 2002–2005 ===
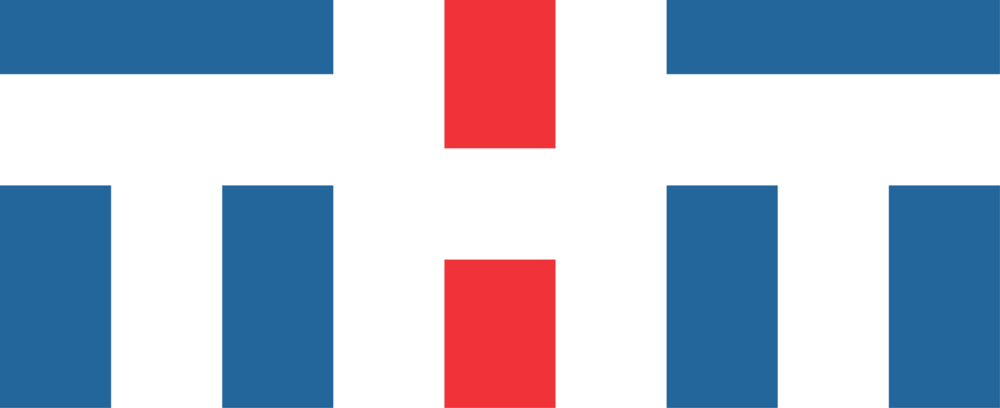
Logo used from 2002 to 2011

TNT targeted a wide range of viewers before the 2002–03 season, broadcasting documentaries, cartoons, and series. There was a proposal to make TNT a sports channel. During the fall of 2002 a sports program, created with NTV Plus Sport, was added to TNT's schedule.

The channel, unable to purchase (or produce) blockbusters, focused on new and less-expensive programming. This approach was successful, and TNT's audience increased from 2.7 to 5.4 percent by the end of 2002. The ratings increase was primarily due to the addition of Okna, a tabloid talk show hosted by Dmitry Nagiyev, and several other programs launched by a new team of managers led by former STS CEO Roman Petrenko. TNT aired Today’s Day, its last old-regime show (whose ratings had fallen precipitously) for the last time on November 15, 2002.

At the end of 2002 the channel adopted a new slogan ("TNT helps you!"), describing itself as "a unique TV channel that not only entertains, but helps you". On February 1, 2003, TNT overhauled its schedule. One of the first programs produced with the new concept was Moscow: Instructions for Proper Use, which replaced Today’s Day. TNT prioritized reality shows and a variety of alternative-entertainment programs. The closed joint-stock company TNT-Teleset became an open one. With the direct participation of Roman Petrenko and Dmitry Troitsky, a number of low-rated programs were replaced with original productions: The Forbidden Zone, The Famine, Reparation School, The Taxi, The Child Robot, Big Brother, Dom, and Dom-2. The latter jump-started the careers of hosts Ksenia Sobchak, Kseniya Borodina and Olga Buzova:

For the first time I saw [Ksenia Sobchak] in 2004 on a video cassette when doing a casting of the future hosts of Home-2 ... I must admit that as a host she was completely inexperienced. But my first impression, which only strengthened in the following years, was: "Boy, she's smart!" Sobchak's daughter, a secular party girl – choosing her as a host seemed to us to be quite a peculiar decision, as we were going to promote as a new host somebody that many have heard about, but which no one had ever seen.

— Dmitry Troitsky

On September 1, 2003, the animated block Nickelodeon on TNT began airing during the day. That month TNT premiered Sasha + Masha, a comedy series which became one of the channel's highest-rated shows. Five seasons were produced until September 2005, when it was rerun. TNT's Comedy Club, featuring stand-up comedy, was inspired by members KVN's New Armenians team:

When I first came to their party, I immediately realized - this is what we needed for the TNT. I saw how their audience reacts to their humor. After the show (which was on Saturday) I approached them and said, on Monday we will sign a contract.

— Dmitry Troitsky

Comedy Club showcases TNT's stable of resident TV comedians, popularizing a "new kind of humor".

=== 2006–2007 ===
The 2006–07 season began not in September but in July, hoping to attract an over-30 audience watching TV at their summer cottages. To expand its reality-show reputation, TNT executives introduced a number of new programs: The Candidate (with Vladimir Potanin), Nanny To the Rescue, Former Wives Club, Wife Exchange, and A Different Life. According to former director-general Roman Petrenko, TNT "had studied almost the entire experience of the TV companies of all around the world and picked up the ideas seeming to have a greater potential, as well as hiring British producers":

We invite foreign specialists. In addition, we have managed to acquire licenses for all of the most famous world TV formats. So, if some channels want to stop broadcasting series - realizing that they do not have any perspective - they cannot get licenses for reality shows. All the packages already belong to us.

— Roman Petrenko

Channel executives began publicly expressing dissatisfaction with Dom-2 (despite its record ratings), and wanted to put it on hiatus for a season or two. None of the new programs was able to match its popularity, however, and Dom-2 remains on the air as Russia's longest-lasting reality TV show.

Happy Together, an adaptation of the American sitcom Married... with Children, premiered in March 2006. Running for seven years, it was one of TNT's most successful sitcoms.

Nasha Russia, a sketch comedy series based on Little Britain and starring Mikhail Galustyan and Sergei Svetlakov, premiered on November 4, 2006. It was popular, and some of its characters (such as the foreign workers Ravshan and Dzhamshut) became national symbols. After running for five seasons, in 2016 (five years after the end of the original series) it was followed by a spin-off: The Bearded Guy. Understand and Forgive, developing one of Nasha Russia's storylines and starring Mikhail Galustyan as unlucky Ryazan guard Sashka Borodach. Galustyan's character became symbolic of a negligent worker.

Also in November 2006, TNT's on-air style was updated. The channel began promoting the people directly (or indirectly) connected with it: hosts, actors in series, participants in Dom-2 and Comedy Club comedians. Clips and advertisements with the slogans "TNT about life. TNT about love. TNT for fun" were shown in a month-long campaign throughout Russia.

The fall advertising campaign was followed by a larger one in spring 2007, featuring the slogan "Feel our love". According to its creator, Alexander Dulerain, "In the entire new advertising history, we wanted to overturn all the concepts familiar to the viewer, to shock him." In a series of short commercials promoting TNT stars (Ksenia Sobchak, Olga Buzova, Alyona Vodonaeva, Garik Kharlamov, Timur Rodriguez, Pavel Volya and Mikhail Galustyan) the multiple meanings of some phrases were played with, balancing between romance and humor.

Competitions between comedians and stand-up teams, a new TV format, began in 2007. Laughter Without Rules, from the producers of Comedy Club, premiered in April. Young comedians competed for large cash prizes, with the winner moving on to A Crazy League. Laughter Without Rules lasted until the December 2009 death of host Vladimir Turchinsky. In August 2010, the show was revived as Comedy Battle and dedicated to Turchinsky. It continued until the end of 2016, and was replaced the following year by Open Mic. In 2007, TNT received the Best TV Channel of the Year award at the Russian Entertainment Awards.

=== 2008–2009 ===
At the beginning of 2008, TNT's most successful reality shows were Dom-2 and Bitva extrasensov, based on Britain's Psychic Challenge. The channel produced its first parody comedy (The Best Movie, from the producers of Comedy Club and starring Garik Kharlamov, Mikhail Galustyan and Pavel Volya) on January 24. The theatrical film co-starred Armen Dzhigarkhanyan and Valery Barinov.

According to its producers, The Best Movie was a "response" to Scary Movie. Their intention was "not just get back the cost of the movie and make more money with its sequel, but to create a successful parody comedy, a new genre unknown to Russian audiences". The producers lacked "raw material", because the Russian film industry does not produce blockbusters comparable to Hollywood's. The film parodies the Russian movies Night Watch, The 9th Company, Shadowboxing and Bimmer, the foreign films Star Wars, The Matrix, Pirates of the Caribbean and Bruce Almighty and the Russian television series Brigada and The Truckers.

With a budget of $5 million (and an equal amount spent on advertising), The Best Movie earned over $30 million at the box office and set the first-weekend record for Russia and the CIS countries ($19.2 million). Second-weekend earnings dropped 72 percent, however, due to poor reviews and negative word of mouth. The Best Movie 2 was released a year later, followed by The Best Movie 3-De in January 2011; both starred Kharlamov. Produced by Monumental Pictures, their runs followed the first film's: a good start, a collapse during the second week and some profit at the end.

TNT targeted young audiences in 2008. Univer, a sitcom about students living in a Moscow dormitory, premiered on August 25. The series, created and produced by Semyon Slepakov and Vyacheslav Dusmukhametov, was directed by Pyotr Tochilin (director of Khottabych):

Semyon and I have long planned a comedy about the hostel, since the time they had lived there. All students know that without jokes and ridiculous situations, studying and living in a hostel is impossible. So we decided to show everything without embellishment.

— Vyacheslav Dusmukhametov

Love in a District, a series about young people belonging to different social groups, premiered on December 19 and ran for two seasons. Univer was more successful and, with its two-season sequel Univer. New Dorm, has produced over 500 episodes. SashaTanya, another Univer spin-off about a couple from the original series, premiered in 2013 and was also successful.

Made in Woman (soon renamed Comedy Woman), inspired by the all-male Comedy Club, premiered at the end of 2008 and was conceived in 2006 by KVN Moscow Megapolis team member Natalia Yeprikyan. Other women from KVN who were involved in the show were Elena Borshcheva, Ekaterina Skulkina, Ekaterina Barnabas, Ekaterina Baranova, Marina Kravets, Maria Kravchenko, Polina Sibagatullina, Tatyana Morozova, Natalia Medvedeva, and Marina Bochkareva. Egor Druzhinin was an occasional host.

Made in Woman is not the same as Comedy Club, and not "a female Comedy Club. It has nothing to do with stand-up but is a completely different genre: pop comedy. It's bright, loud and funny. Remember in the past, when terms as "a variety artist", "a pop star" and "theatre of variety miniatures" existed? A variety of performance does not just mean a person with a microphone, delivering a monologue or a set of jokes. It's also dances, songs, disguises, and tricks! In Made in Woman, there are jokes that you need to think about and pure clowning.

— Director Dmitry Efimovich,

Barvikha, a comedy-drama about school life in an elite cottage community, premiered in fall 2009. Its creators described it as a "new-generation series" and "cinematic" (the series was filmed in 1080p), with carefully written dialogue – the writers visited Barvikha – and good performances. The series raised questions about the interaction of children with others from families with a different social status. Two seasons were filmed (one 20 episodes and the other 15), and the second season was broadcast in 2011 as Bright Young Things: Barvikha 2.

TNT participated in 2009's Year of the Young, supporting the youth-volunteer Train of Youth and broadcasting over 500 public service announcements. The channel supported 12 information campaigns about healthy lifestyles, the HIV prevention, combating tobacco and other addiction, supporting blood donation and inclusive education, and counteracting human trafficking. A year earlier, TNT was an information sponsor of the Year of the Family and produced election videos with the slogan "Don't be a vegetable - vote!" In November 2009, TNT received an award from the Coalition of Nonprofit Organizations for "Socially Responsible Media: Putting Social Advertising on the Air".

=== 2010–2011 ===
Alexander Dulerain became TNT's general producer of the TNT in 2010, replacing Dmitri Troitsky (who left the channel). The channel premiered two sitcoms: "The Interns" in March and The Swell Guys in November.

Interns writer Vyacheslav Dusmukhametov graduated from the South Ural State Medical University. His experiences inspired the series:

When I was in ninth grade, my grandmother underwent surgery. After the operation, a doctor with heavy boots and a pack of Marlboros in his hand went out and asked: "Dusmuhametov?" – then lit a cigarette and inhaled the smoke. "Your grandma will live." He was, literally, playing God. It seemed to me that being a doctor was a brutal and hot-shot kind of profession.

— Vyacheslav Dusmukhametov

Like Univer, The Interns did not copy American sitcoms. In the magazine The Art of Cinema, Olga Ganzhara agrees with star Ivan Okhlobystin that The Interns is more than a traditional situational comedy; it "has discovered a new genre – having something in common with a classic kind of TV series and a sitcom based on an incredible playwriting material". The Interns was filmed like a "full-length movie", with rehearsals, multiple takes, a Red One camera, and no laugh track. According to Dusmukhametov, The Interns expanded the TNT demographic from 18–30 to 14–44.

Okhlobystin's character, department head Andrei Evgenievich Bykov, inspires a "Bykov's army" and creates a "paradoxical and ironic rationalism with which he tends to percept the reality" reminiscent of Hugh Laurie's portrayal of Gregory House. Okhlobystin's character, however, is purely Russian: full of love and respect for human suffering. Dr. Bykov regularly mocks a foreign colleague; learning in an early episode that the intern Levin (like House) is going to treat rare, complex illnesses, he asks who is going to treat ordinary patients – the ones filling up the hospitals:

Indeed - the patient and the way he is being treated in "The Interns" are of little, or better say, almost zero importance. They just make the background for developing and organizing the action, the most convenient way to bring forward all sorts of adventures, a source of adrenaline, a real school of life, a place for the youngsters to get mature. The disease is an informational cause that initiates communication ...

— Olga Ganzhara

The last episode of The Interns aired in February 2016; that June, the series received a TEFI award for best TV sitcom series.

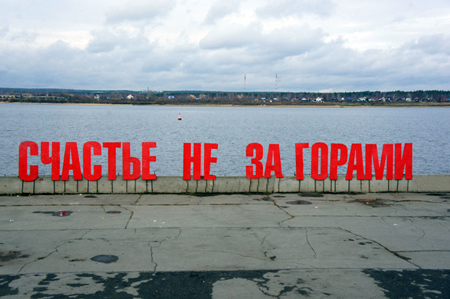
"Happiness is coming soon", a slogan popular with Perm residents, is part of the Swell Guys title sequence. The sign is on the river called Kama, near the Perm I rail station.

Swell Guys, a reality series, premiered on November 8, 2010, and finished second in the ratings (after The Interns). It was conceived by Anton Zaitsev, a founder of Good Story Media and member of the KVN Parma team. Directed by Jeanne Kadnikova, the series starred Nikolai Naumov.

Swell Guys was set and filmed in Perm. Kolyan (Naumov), known to the police, is caught committing a petty theft; to avoid jail, he agrees to participate in a reality show. A camera operator follows him everywhere (filming his life, work and friends), and his only requirement is to live honestly. Swell Guys involved the whole city in its production; most of the series' over 150 characters are non-professional actors, often using their own names. The sitcom, with no fixed plot, was improvised by the actors, the director and the producers:

The situation was to be so ridiculous and paradoxical that whatever character was able to exist in it would be ridiculous, no matter what he said. We tell the actors you have to talk about that and that, and he or she improvises in the episode.

— Anton Zaitsev

The series featured a gallery of city characters: bright young people, students, party girls, marginalized people, traders, hard workers, managers, businessmen, soldiers, policemen, criminals, and "the guys" (Kolyan and his friends). After several months, the entire cast became known in Perm and throughout Russia. Actor Konstantin Khabensky, Serbian volleyball team captain Bojan Janić, and writer Alexei Ivanov were fans:

I had a lot of fun watching Swell Guys ... I liked the acting. It looked extremely real; the characters seem quite real, the replicas are exact, [and] the movie resembles real-life ... In this series I first saw a new style of living born before my eyes ... Do not forget, I was born in the Soviet Union. I saw people who are quite well off, feeling comfortable with the existing lifestyle, understanding its laws and avoiding conflict with it. And I'm interested in looking at people for whom such a life is quite common. It's like watching the inhabitants of the sea depths. It's interesting to see how things are going on at the bottom of the ocean. I cannot live there, but fish can. That's the way I interpret Swell Guys.

— Aleksey Ivanov

An award for a "criminal" series set in Perm was controversial. It was accepted by five members of the Swell Guys team: Anton Zaitsev, Zhanna Kadnikova, producer Yuri Ovchinnikov, director Sergei Dolgushin, and star Nikolai Naumov.

The most successful 2011 premiere was Zaitsev + 1, a sitcom about a clumsy student with a split personality. Created by Denis Kosyakov, Sasha Zaitsev and his alter ego Fedor were played by Philip Kotov and Mikhail Galustyan. The first episode, aired on April 11, had a 30.4-percent share of the 18–32 demographic; that night, TNT was the most-watched channel from 20:30 to 21:00. The series was watched by 16 percent of viewers from six to 54 years old. Gérard Depardieu guest-starred in season three:

I had a lot of fun in the series ... I'm also glad that I worked with good, creative actors. For the first time, I acted in front of a green screen ... The show makes you feel young. It has been an honor for me to participate in Zaitsev +1.

— Gerard Depardieu

TNT executives promised to attract more top foreign actors for their programs. During the summer of 2011, TNT-Teleset became a co-owner of the TRK SKAT channel in Samara Oblast after purchasing 26 percent of its shares.

On November 2, the Federal Antimonopoly Service included TNT on its list of federal channels and published its ratings for national and regional advertising. The channel's national share was in fifth place, at 9.3 percent.

=== 2012–2013 ===
On February 6, 2012, TNT began its Rainbow TV service on the ABS-1 satellite in the UTC+2 time zone. It was discontinued on December 5, 2014. After the success of Univer and Swell Guys, a sitcom entitled Girrrls premiered in April 2012. The series was about four girls from Saratov who live in a Moscow apartment:

The series has something in common with Sex and the City and Friends, but the former is designed for a younger audience. There is no single woman left by an unfaithful husband or a corrupt police officer, and there are no former KVN players (who, to put it mildly, have already made everybody sick).

— Katerina Matveeva

The series was filmed in Moscow with local actors, and the choice of Saratov as the girls’ hometown was due to the city's dialect. It ran for five seasons, with the sixth scheduled for fall 2017. TNT was included in Russian digital television's second multiplex set on December 14, 2012.

Through my Eyes, a point-of-view series, premiered on January 27, 2013. Its narrative is nonlinear, and the POV filming reveals a character's personality and history. Created by Ilya Kulikov and directed by Zaur Bolotayev, it was advertised as a "movie series":

We came up with the "movie series" description for a product that could be sold to viewers; it was not just a movie but involves drama, history, skilled direction, and good writing. We do not want the series to last for ten years and more; we want to launch two or three seasons, and then make a full-length film based on the material.

— Through My Eyes producer Valery Fedorovich in 2016

Fox Television Studios bought the rights for an American adaptation with the same name, and it was announced that filming had begun. It was produced by Lawrence Bender, a frequent collaborator with Quentin Tarantino.

The adaptation of the Russian TV series in the US is a huge success not only for TNT but for Russian television. We hope very much that after this, our American colleagues will pay attention to our television series and discover Russia in the same way as they have discovered the UK and Israeli productions.

— Valery Fedorovich

TNT considered and dismissed the possibility of a second season of Through my Eyes, so the series has 19 episodes and an open ending. Roman Petrenko became chairman of the TNT-TeleNet board of directors and Igor Goichberg became TNT's general director in July 2013.

=== 2014 ===
At the end of January 2014, Igor Mishin replaced Igor Goyhberg as TNT's general director. The channel purchased Swell Guys producer Good Story Media, which had primarily produced for STS. Although the purchase price was not announced, analysts estimated it at $50 million; according to Kommersant, a total of about $400 million was spent on Comedy Club Productions (in 2012) and Good Story Media.

This is one of the ways we react to the fall of the market. The seemingly expensive acquisition of the two large companies (Comedy Club Productions and Good Story Media) turned out to be a magic wand which led to a good solution during the difficult years. Indeed, two-thirds of our content is being produced by these two companies. They work within the consolidated budget of TNT and do nothing for anyone else except TNT.

— Igor Mishin in 2016

P. E. Teacher, starring Dmitry Nagiyev as Oleg Evgenevich Fomin ("Foma", a reformed criminal who is forced to get a job as a gym teacher), premiered in April. Its first episode was watched by 31.8 percent of Moscow viewers aged 14 to 44, a record for the channel. The Moscow share of viewers aged 6 to 54 was 22.6 percent, and 23.8 percent throughout Russia. Its 18–30 share was 41.8 percent in Moscow, and 36 percent in the rest of the country. According to TNS Gallup, the series was the fifth-most-popular program on Russian television (with a rating of five percent and a share of 12.7 percent) in April 2014. The main reasons for its success (unexpected even by the series' creators) were Nagiyev's performance and the intersection of two eras: the criminal 1990s and the present:

The hero is forced to leave his habitual environment, and begins his wandering in an unfamiliar world with the only desire to pacify his mind. The world of the past in the series is a world of bandits, violence, shooters, raids, and falsifications, a world of tough guys in black jeeps with gold chains on the necks. We are sure it has disappeared; it has stopped existing because life has changed ... The new world is also not an exemplar of honesty ... In this world, a university diploma can be bought if you have enough money ... The crooks have not vanished, they have just moved to the governmental offices stealing the budget. This world is just as cruel as the former one but more hypocritical ... In today's world, the veterans are forced out of their apartments, fake cognac is being sold and drugs can be brought into schools.

— Film Art magazine critic Vladimir Kolotaev

In his new world, the brutal, simple-minded and defenseless Foma tries to do two things he has never done before: win the heart of a woman and save a child. His students are not afraid of him, and they are teaching each other. Although Foma's path is rough, he slowly and painfully improves. Critics noted an improvement in TNT program quality from Interns to Swell Guys and P. E. Teacher:

Never before had such a diverse audience - from the fifth column to the average commoners - been so unanimous about a TV program ... Hearing discussion of a new episode of P. E. Teacher and praise for Nagiyev from people who appreciate Little Britain more than Nasha Russia is an incredible thing ... The most amazing thing is that for artists it does not seem to be a guilty pleasure or a zone-out but a full-fledged pleasure.

— Bulat Latypov

P. E. Teacher was included on Afisha magazine's list of top-10 Russian TV series of 2014. It received Best Comedy TV Series and Best Screenplay awards from the Association of Producers of Cinema and Television in 2014, and a TEFI nomination for Best Sitcom in 2015. Its fourth-season premiere was scheduled for the end of June 2017.

Sweet Life is a series produced by Andrei Dzhunkovsky about a single mother (Marta Nosova), a go-go dancer from Perm. After spurning the governor's son, Sasha acquires dangerous enemies, alienates her friends (including her sweetheart), leaves her child with her grandmother and goes to Moscow in the hope of vanishing. In the capital city, she has relationships with six successful 30-year-old men. Because of adult situations and mat (obscene language), two versions of the series were produced: one for prime time and an uncensored version for late night.

It was the first Russian series to premiere on the Internet two weeks before being broadcast; some episodes of Swell Guys appeared on the Internet several hours before their TV premiere to attract an audience. Amediateka (a paid video service) bought the rights to the series, and made all six uncensored first-season episodes available on May 15, 2014. The cost was not disclosed:

This transaction is not just profitable for TNT, because we make money on it. This is a new source of income, giving us more opportunities to produce TV series. We are not afraid of competition from the Internet; on the contrary, we consider it a wonderful opportunity for our channel to become better known.

— Alexander Dulerain, General Producer of TNT

Sweet Life was the first domestic series shown by Amediateka. It was the service's second-most-popular show, after the first season of Game of Thrones. During its first two weeks, Sweet Life was seen by almost 11,000 viewers.

Dancing, based on So You Think You Can Dance, premiered in August. Contestants competed for the title of the best dancer in Russia and a top prize of ₽3 million. The show was produced by Comedy Club Productions, which had produced TNT's Dancing Without Rules in 2008.

It was not the first popular dance program on Russian television; Russia-1 premiered Dancing with the Stars in 2006 and Big Dancing in 2013, and Channel One Russia aired Dance! in 2015. According to music critic Boris Barabanov, Dancing had the greatest audience impact:

Dancing has changed not only Miguel's life but the nationwide perception of choreography. The show attracts about ten thousand people to the selection committee every year, and the number of subscribers to Miguel's Instagram page has exceeded one and a half million.

— Boris Barabanov (2016)

Chernobyl: Zone of Exclusion, directed by Anders Banke, was influenced by Through My Eyes. Its premiere was postponed several times, and its script (by Ilya Kulikov and Yevgeny Nikishov) was inspired by The Blair Witch Project. Set in the Chernobyl Exclusion Zone, it was rewritten at the request of TNT creative producer Valery Fedorovich. In the series, five teenagers enter the ghost town of Pripyat in pursuit of a thief. Although they have an opportunity to return to 1986 and prevent the Chernobyl disaster, the zone is their worst enemy. What begins as a road movie becomes a mystical thriller, an action film and a disaster film. The first-season suggests an alternate history in which the Soviet Union avoids dissolution and the US loses its superpower status.

The producers decided that the series needed a foreigner to have a look at it. The setting of Chernobyl seemed really powerful to me. It is original. It brings together all my favorite genres, and the series is flavored with some wonderful and light black humor the Russians like so much ... In the world of big commercial movies, changing genres is considered to be quite dangerous. But I like this kind of risk.

— Director Anders Banke

The series was the first in Russia to be shown in cinemas before its TV premiere. All eight first-season episodes were previewed on September 24, 2014, at the October Cinema in Moscow for an audience of show-business figures. The season was later previewed in 18 Russian cities: Saint Petersburg, Perm, Krasnoyarsk, Yekaterinburg, Vladivostok, Kemerovo, Novosibirsk, Saratov, Irkutsk, Izhevsk, Omsk, Ulyanovsk, Tula, Barnaul, Tomsk, Ufa, Chelyabinsk and Voronezh.

Chernobyl: Zone of Exclusion received good ratings; its premiere had a nationwide 28.4-percent share of the age 14–44 audience (29.9 percent in Moscow), and its nationwide 18–30 share was 34.9 percent (40.4 percent in Moscow). In the first week after the placement of the series on Rutube, it had a record 6.1 million views (1.6 million more than the first episode of P. E. Teacher, the previous record-holder. With P. E. Teacher, Chernobyl was included on Afisha's 2014 list of 10 best Russian series and was nominated for a number of awards. The second season was filmed in the US and broadcast on TV-3. The TNT-Comedy channel was launched on September 1, replacing the satellite Comedy TV channel.

=== 2015 ===
Law of the Stone Jungle, a series about gangsters and hipsters, premiered in March 2015. The series was directed by Ivan Burlakov, in his directing debut. According to Gazeta.Ru reporter Yaroslav Zabaluev, it is an "ingenious show about former students who decide to become gangsters". Law of the Stone Jungle was inspired by Danny Boyle's Trainspotting, Guy Ritchie's Lock, Stock and Two Smoking Barrels, the films of Quentin Tarantino and Robert Rodriguez, and the British teenage series Misfits and Skins.

The writers play with genres, diluting gloomy Moscow reality with comic-book aesthetics. Law of the Stone Jungle turns into a black comedy, then into a film about growing up and falling in love for the first time, then into a parody of classic criminal movies ... TNT again confirmed that it can successfully compete with the best-known Russian TV channels.

— Vera Tsvetkova in Nezavisimaya Gazeta

The pilot episode of Law of the Stone Jungle had a nationwide age 14–44 share of 18.8 percent (12.8 percent in Moscow). Its 18–30 Moscow share was 25 percent.

After the success of Swell Guys and P. E. Teacher, Anton Shchukin produced a more-traditional sitcom: A Private Security Agency. The series' characters, five hapless employees of the Cedrus security agency who are guarding the Nightingale shopping center, get into awkward situations due to their naiveté and honesty. Star Sergei Styopin said that he did not know what aspects of the series are fictional. According to Shchukin, he intended to depict the humor in the natural and habitual. The series ran for two seasons.

Two series dealt with sex. Infidelity, starring Elena Lyadova, was a 16-part series about adultery in which Asya (Lyadova) and her husband each have three lovers; its theme was that people are not what they seem. Its pilot premiere had a nationwide age 18–30 share of 25 percent. Lyadova and director Vadim Perelman received 2016 TEFI awards, and the series was nominated for Best TV Movie/Series. Youth sitcom The Sex-Obsessed, or Love is Evil was created by Comedy Club resident Semyon Slepakov, written by Irina Denezhkina (author of the novel Let Me!) and directed by Boris Khlebnikov.

=== 2016 ===
On January 1, 2016, TNT4 replaced the 2×2 channel and began broadcasting TNT reruns and TNT-Comedy programs. The following month, TNT's general director was transferred to the GPM Entertainment TV subsidiary (whose general director was Artur Janibekyan) as its channel director. The position was created for Igor Mishin, who left on June 15.

TNT premiered Island, a reality show spoofing Dom-2, on February 8. Four men and four women reach a deserted island on which TV cameras are hidden. On the first day, the film crew "dies" in a yacht explosion. The show's participants, falsely convinced that millions of viewers are watching them, rush to produce the show and organize SMS voting. Like the participants in Dom-2, they pair off and begin relationships. They are accompanied by a local resident who does not speak their language and whom they do not understand. There are a number of mocking references to Dom-2 and other TNT programs. Igor Karev of Gazeta.ru recommended Island to fans of Interns and those who "have always dreamed of watching Dom-2, but hesitated to do so." The series' success spawned a second season, followed by a third scheduled for 2018.

Olga, starring Yana Troyanova, was a comedy drama which outdid Interns and P. E. Teacher in popularity among its target nationwide 14–44 audience in September. Its ratings doubled TNT's average daily audience.

The Bearded Guy: Understand and Forgive was based on Nasha Russia. Grigory Constantinople's four-episode black comedy, A Drunken Firm, starred Mikhail Yefremov, Elizaveta Boyarskaia, Anna Mikhalkova and Marat Basharov. It received the Best TV Film/Series award from the Association of Producers of Cinema and Television, and Efremov received the Best Actor award. On December 27, TNT began broadcasting in HD.

=== 2017 ===
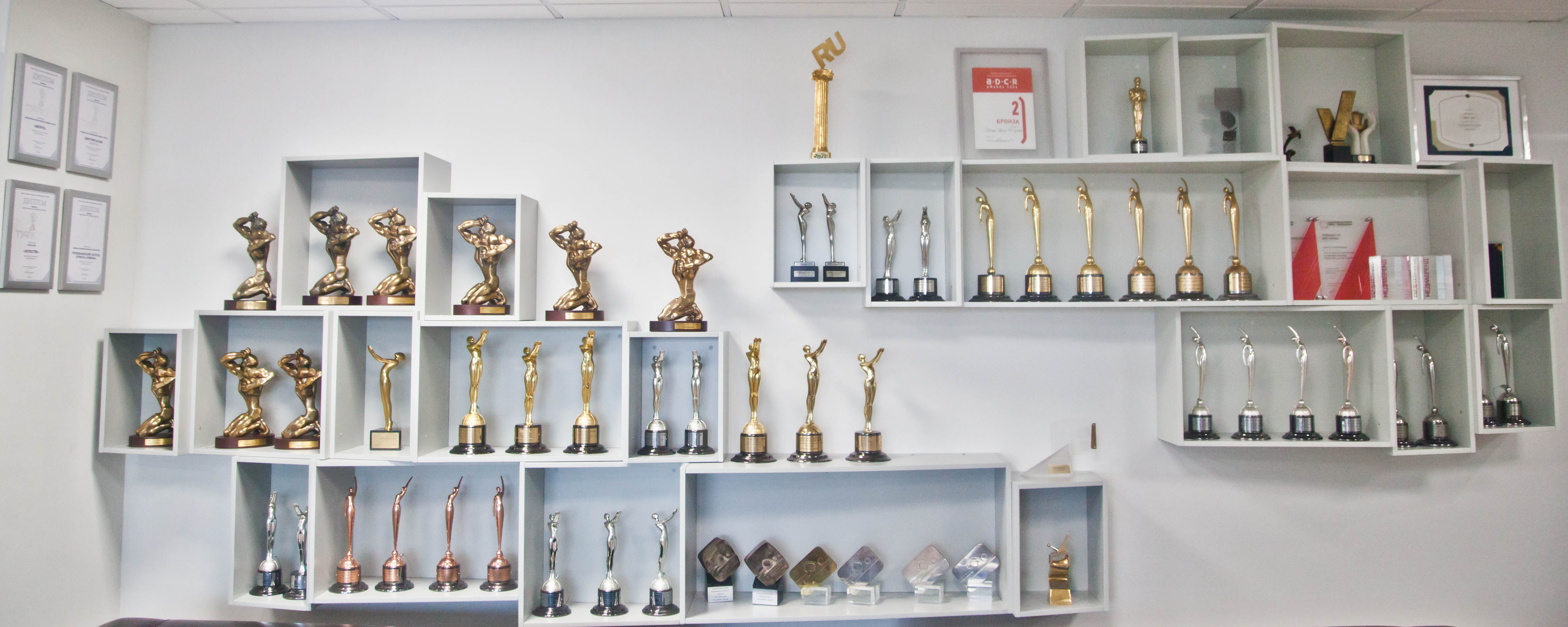
TNT awards in 2017

The Adaptation, a comedy series, premiered in February. The Central Intelligence Agency conducts a secret operation, Rosilda, to gather information about Russian technology for gas production. The CIA's best agent, Ashton Ivey, infiltrates Gazprom Dobycha YANAO in Noyabrsk as Russian engineer Oleg Menshov. He meets Marina and Valera on the way to Noyabrsk, who complicates his work. The series stars Leonid Bichevin and Peter Jacobson. Although it begins with an announcement that the plot is "imaginary", the authors say that it is based on some fact.

The Philological Faculty, directed by Fedor Stukov, premiered in April. An attempt to repeat the success of Univer, it examines the issue that Russian philological faculties teach mostly women; at a university, three men find themselves among a lot of women. Singer and humorist Efim Shifrin was invited to play the teacher.

Series expected in 2017 were Zhora Kryzhovnikov's Phone DiCaprio, The Cultural Year with Fyodor Bondarchuk, Home Confinement with Pavel Derevyanko, Polar-17 with Mikhail Porechenkov and Alexander Bashirov, The Mounted Police with Arthur Smolyaninov, Big Cheese with Roman Popov, and The Light from Another World. TNT also planned to premiere Bonus, a rap musical by Valeriya Gai Germanika. Other programs were Bitva extrasensov, Dances, Bachelor and Dom-2. Upcoming Comedy Club productions were HB, Stand Up, Comedy Woman, Comedy Club, Comedy Battle, Improvisation, Once in Russia, Love Is and Open Microphone.

=== 2020 ===
In November 2020, TNT launched in the United Kingdom and debuted on Freeview channel 271 as part of the line-up of local and international channels provided by Channelbox.
