= Garik Martirosyan =

Armenian comedian

- Гарик Мартиросян
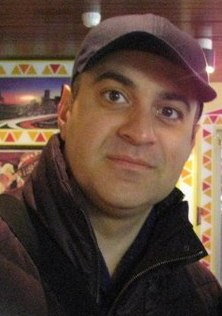
- Martirosyan in 2013
- Born: February 14, 1974 (age 52); Yerevan, Armenian SSR, Soviet Union
- Spouse: Zhanna Levina

Comedy career
- Years active: 1996–present
- Genres: Stand-up, Sketch comedy

Garik Yurievich Martirosyan (Russian: Гарик Юрьевич Мартиросян, Armenian: Գարիկ Մարտիրոսյան; born February 14, 1974) is a Russia-based Armenian entertainer, comedian, TV host, actor, and singer. He is the co-producer and host of the Comedy Club Russia which airs on Russian TV channel TNT. He was also one of four hosts of Prozhektorperiskhilton broadcast on Channel One.

== Biography ==
Garik Martirosyan was born on February 14, 1974, in Yerevan, Armenian SSR, Soviet Union. In 2002, he graduated from Yerevan State Medical University with a degree in neurology. He worked three years in a psychological hospital. From 1993 to 2002, he was a member (captain from 1997) of the New Armenians team of the Russian TV show KVN. In 2003, with the help of fellow New Armenians Artur Janibekyan and Artash Sarksyan, he founded Comedy Club. Together with Larisa Dolina, he won the Two Stars TV show. He hosted the first two seasons of Minute of Fame, the Russian version of America's Got Talent on Channel One. He and his wife Zhanna Levina met in Sochi and have a daughter named Jasmine, who was born in 2004, and son Daniel, born in 2009.

== Politics ==
In March 2007, his brother Levon Martirosyan announced that Garik intends to participate in the pre-election campaign of the United Liberal-National Party of Armenia. The idea to establish the party belonged to Garik.

== Selected filmography ==
=== TV ===
- Comedy Club (2005–present)
- Nasha Russia (2006–2011)
- Minute of Fame (2007–present)
- Prozhektorperiskhilton (2008–present)
- Main Stage (2015)

=== Film ===
- Our Russia. The Balls of Fate (2010)

== See also ==
- Armenians in Russia
