= Real Comedy =

- Created by: Andriy Molochny, Anton Lirnyk
- Country of origin: Ukraine
- Original language: Russian (predominantly)

Production
- Production locations: Kyiv, Ukraine

Original release
- Network: 2+2
- Release: present

Related
- Faina Yukraina

Real Comedy (Ukraine) is a Ukrainian stand-up comedy television show.

The show was created by former members of the Comedy Club UA and Comedy Club Andriy Molochny and Anton Lirnyk who are known for their performance as a comic-duo "Chekhov's duet". The project is part of the Comedy Club Production initiatives that established the Comedy Club in Moscow followed by several spin-offs across the territory of the former Soviet Union including Ukraine.

The new project conducts the battle of candidates providing the current rating for each performer (individual or collective).

== Residents ==
- Duo "DiCh – the Duet in honour of Chekhov" (Andriy Molochny and Anton Lirnyk)
- Duo "Love" (Katya and Seryozha)
- Yevhen Bozhestveny
- Duo "T.V.U.Z." (Bohdan "Baian" and Frank)
- Duo "Chornoslyv" (Val and Billy)
- Duo "Vorner Brothers" (Rutem de Niro and Oleksandr Viktorovych)
- Galust
- Duo "Of small and middle business" (Mykyta "Arystokrat" and "That one, what's his name")
- Igor Shmigar (Igor Gvedde) - costumed stand-up

== See also ==
Faina Yukraina
