= The Best Movie 3-De =

- Theatrical release poster
- Directed by: Kirill Kuzin
- Written by: Artak Gasparyan; Garic Kharlamov
- Starring: Garik Kharlamov; Mikhail Galustyan; Timur Batrudinov; Evgeniy Vereschagin; Dmitriy Khrustalyov
- Production companies: Columbia Pictures; Monumental Pictures; Comedy Club Production
- Distributed by: Sony Pictures Releasing International
- Release date: January 20, 2011
- Running time: 97 minutes
- Country: Russia
- Language: Russian
- Budget: RUR 6.5 million
- Box office: RUR 9.8 million

The Best Movie 3-De (Russian: Самый лучший фильм 3-Дэ, romanized: Samiy luchshiy film 3-De) is a 2011 Russian comedy from Monumental Pictures (Sony Pictures Entertainment) and Comedy Club Production, continuation of 2009 The Best Movie 2 film, spoofing such famous Russian films as Admiral, Burnt by the Sun 2, Stilyagi, Black Lightning, and others.

== Plot ==
The film opens with a black-and-white sequence titled The Leader’s Secret, a parody of Soviet-era cinema set in Petrograd in 1918. A soldier wanders through a vast building, asking people for hot water and eventually meets Vladimir Lenin, who invites him to a grand, empty hall. As they enter, Lenin suddenly transforms into a terrifying creature with wings (resembling a werewolf, triggered by a full moon) and devours the soldier. The scene then shifts to a normal-looking Lenin smoking by the window, cryptically remarking, "How many soldiers have I trapped with hot water!" The sequence ends with two soldiers outside, hearing a wolf's howl and commenting that Lenin must have devoured someone again. This surreal short film is the work of Maxim Utyosov, an underappreciated amateur director.

Meanwhile, the Russian Film Academy is hosting a prestigious "Best Russian Film" competition featuring acclaimed movies like Admiral, Black Lightning, and Taras Bulba. The tapes, the only copies, are locked in a safe before the awards ceremony. Viktor Palych, head of a major illegal film-copying operation, bribes the event's organizer, Eduard Rykov, to acquire the tapes for piracy. Max and his friend Sania are tasked with delivering them, but after a series of chaotic events, they accidentally destroy the tapes in a car explosion. Now pursued by video pirates, Max, Sania, and an amnesiac girl must recreate the lost films in just three days. Enlisting help from friends and family, they manage to make slapdash versions of the films. On the festival day, these improvised "copies" fail to impress, but Max's amateur film, The Leader’s Secret, unexpectedly wins the grand prize.

== Cast ==
- Garik Kharlamov - Maxim Utyosov
- Peter Vince - Alexander Poplavkov
- Ekaterina Kuznetsova - Varya Vytrisopleva
- Alexander Baluev - Viktor Pavlovich
- Valentin Smirnitsky - Edward Rykov
- Mikhail Olegovich Yefremov - teacher Misha
- Alexander Semchev - Uncle Pasha
- Oleg Sorokin - Askold
- Alexander Andrienko - Major
- Denis Yakovlev - Bondarchuk
- Michael Gorsky - Lieutenant
