= Our Russia. The Balls of Fate =

- Theatrical release poster
- Directed by: Gleb Orlov; Maksim Pezhemsky
- Written by: Semyon Slepakov; Vyacheslav Dusmukhametov; Alexey Lyaporov; Garik Martirosyan
- Produced by: Artur Janibekyan; Ruben Dishdishyan; Garik Martirosyan; Semyon Slepakov; Alexander Dulerayn
- Starring: Sergei Svetlakov; Mikhail Galustyan; Valeriy Magdiash; Viktor Verzhbitsky
- Music by: Pavel Volya; DJ Groove
- Production companies: Central Partnership; Comedy Club Production
- Release date: 21 January 2010
- Running time: 85 minutes
- Country: Russia
- Language: Russian
- Budget: 2 million dollars
- Box office: 22 212 223 dollars

Our Russia. Balls of Fate (Russian: Наша Russia. Яйца судьбы, romanized: Nasha Russia. Yaitsa sudby) is a 2010 Russian comedy film directed by Gleb Orlov and Maksim Pezhemsky and starring Sergey Svetlakov, Mikhail Galustyan, Valeriy Magdiash and Viktor Verzhbitsky. It is based on the sketch-comedy series Our Russia (which itself is an adaptation of the show Little Britain) and follows most of its characters, mainly gastarbeiters Ravshan (Galustyan) and Dzhamshut (Magdiash) and their boss Leonid (Svetlakov). The film was the highest-grossing film of 2010 in Russia with $22.2 million in ticket sales.

== Plot ==
The story begins with Viktor Marianovich Ryabushkin, the richest billionaire in Moscow. He had the Golden Balls of Genghis Khan, which brought him wealth and power. He would show them to his family and friends but after that, he killed them so that they would not tell anyone his secret. After he murdered them all, he decided to make repairs since the traces of bullets damaged the walls in the house. Brigadier Leonid receives an order to repair the apartment.

Ravshan and Dzhamshut again come to Moscow for repairs in Marjanovic's apartment. Once there, migrant workers tear down and ruin expensive interior items and find the hiding place with the Golden Balls of Genghis Khan. Hearing on the TV about an accident with a minibus, they think that their boss is in trouble and start looking for him around the city. They manage to lose his money in a lottery, but having stolen a car from the casino, they visit the corporation of another oligarch, Oleg Robertovich, and destroy the career of Nikolai Baskov. Later they came to the Sklifosovsky Institute, bury the skeleton with the chief's clothes and fight against the "zombie boss", defeat Victor Marjanovich, get the Balls of Fate and return.

== Cast ==
- Sergei Svetlakov - Leonid, "boss" / Ivan Dulin the gay / Siphon the homeless / Slavik the teenager / Snezhana Denisovna the teacher / Inspector of the traffic police Laptev / Sergei Yuryevich Belyakov
- Mikhail Galustyan - Ravshan / Beard the homeless / Dimon the teenager / Alyona
- Valeriy Magdiash - Jamshut
- Sergei Svetlakov - Leonid, "boss"
- Alexander Semchev - Bison
- Viktor Verzhbitsky - Victor Marjanovich Ryabushkin

== Tajikistan ban ==
The film is banned in Tajikistan.
