= Marina Kravets =

Russian actress (born 1984)

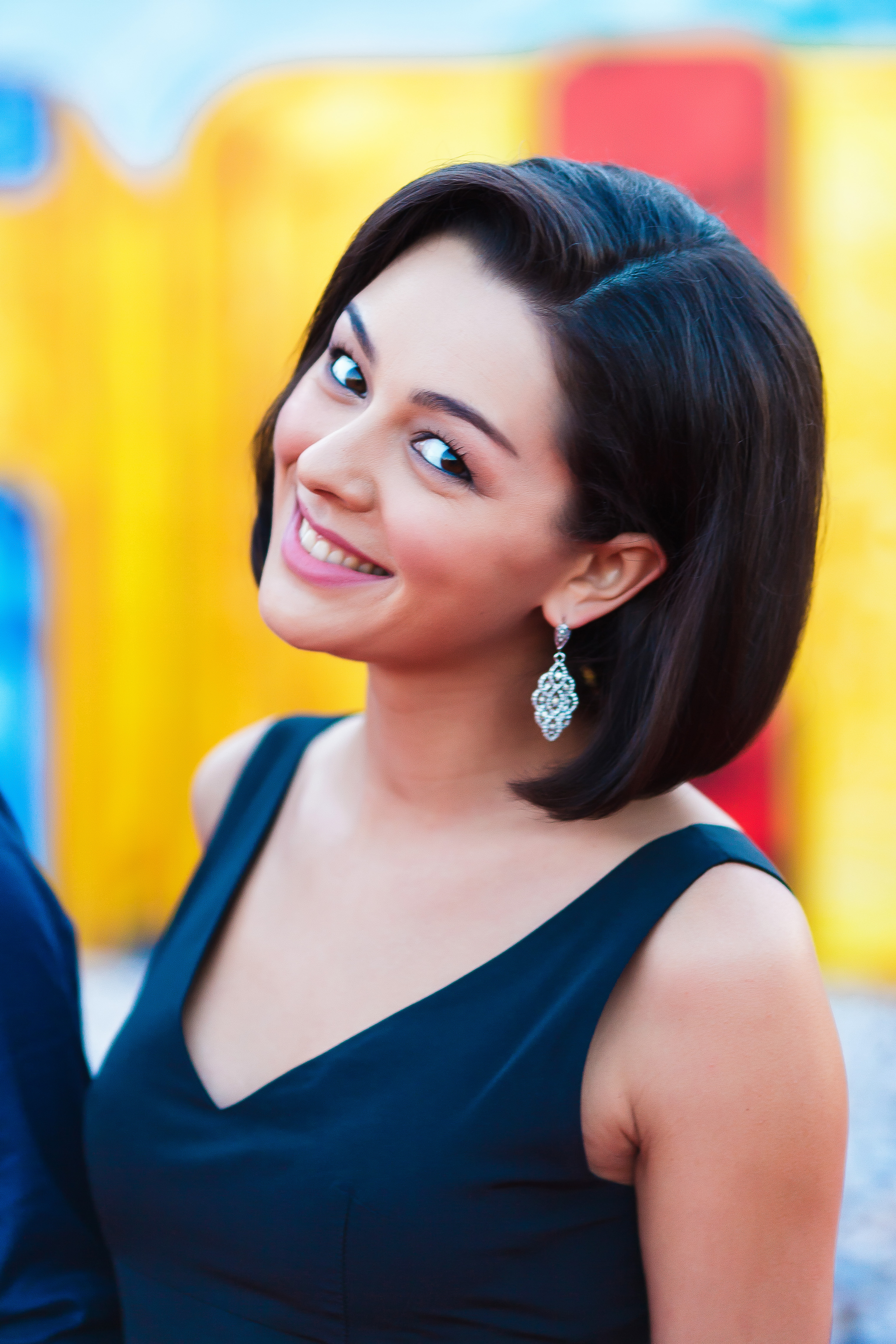
- Born: May 18, 1984 (age 42); Leningrad, Russian SFSR, Soviet Union
- Education: Saint Petersburg State University
- Occupations: Radio moderator, singer, actress
- Known for: Comedy Club
- Height: 5 ft 7 in (170 cm)

Marina Leonidovna Kravets (Russian: Марина Леонидовна Кравец, born 18 May 1984 in Leningrad, USSR) is a Russian actress radio moderator and singer. She is the only permanent female participant of the Russian television show Comedy Club.

== Early life ==
Marina was born on 18 May 1984 in Saint Petersburg as the youngest child with two older brothers. She attended school at gymnasium number 524. Graduated from Saint Petersburg State University with a degree in philology.

== Private life ==
Kravets married Arkady Vodakhov on the 20 July 2013, who studied together with Kravets at the philological faculty and took part in KVN. In 2020 she gave birth to a daughter Veronika.
