= Nasha Russia =

Russian sketch show

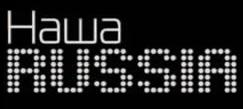
- Created by: Semyon Slepakov; Maxim Pezhemsky
- Starring: Mikhail Galustyan; Sergey Svetlakov; Valery Magdiash; Mikhail Dodzin
- Country of origin: Russia
- No. of episodes: 98

Production
- Running time: 30 mins

Original release
- Network: TNT
- Release: 2006 – 2011

Nasha Russia (Russian: Наша Russia, literally "Our Russia") is a Russian sketch show based on the British comedy show Little Britain, created by Comedy Club Production. It was written by former KVN players and producers Semyon Slepakov, Garik Martirosyan and Ilya Romanko. A 2010 film was made based on the characters in the show titled Our Russia. The Balls of Fate.

== Content ==
The name of the show references the fact that while the name of the country is pronounced "Rossiya" in Russian, foreigners pronounce it "Russia," or as the show emphasizes, "RASHA." Thus to native Russian speakers the name of the show is, "OUR RASHA." The shows offers social and political satire of everyday life in modern-day Russia. The premise is that although Russian people recognize that many aspects of their society are in a poor state ripe for comedy, they are still proud to live in their country, hence the title of the show ("Our Russia"). Each episode features a unique introductory monologue that describes this concept. The following was used in the first episode:

We live in the most wonderful country in the world, while all other countries are envious of us. We were the first to fly to outer space and we were the first to return. We invented the hydrogen bomb, the Zhiguli automobile, and many other horrifying things. We were the ones who cultivated the virgin lands of Kazakhstan and abandoned Georgian mineral water. We were the ones who reversed the flow of rivers and women. We proudly call our country Rossiya, while envious foreigners call it Russia! But still, it is ours. It is NASHA (our) RUSSIA!

Original quote in Russian

Мы живем в самой прекрасной стране на свете, а все остальные страны нам завидуют. Ведь именно мы первыми полетели в космос и первыми прилетели из него. Это мы придумали водородную бомбу, автомобиль «Жигули» и много других страшных вещей. Это мы подняли казахстанскую целину и опустили грузинскую минералку. Это мы повернули вспять реки и женщин. Мы гордо называем свою страну Россия, а иностранцы завистливо говорят РАША! Но все-таки она наша. НАША РАША!

	Season count
Season 1	November 2006 - March 2007
Season 2	March 2007 - May 2007
Season 3	December 2007 - February 2008
Season 4	November 2008 - March 2009
Season 5	December 2010 - October 2011

== Personalities ==
=== Ravshan and Jamshut ===
Ravshan and Jamshut (Равшан и Джамшут), the most popular characters of the sketch show, are gastarbeiters from Tajikistan. They work for their boss Leonid in Moscow and call him "nasäĺnika" (Russian: насяльника, mispronounced word "начальник" - boss). Ravshan does all the talking in bad Russian while Jamshut is silent for the most part, presumably because he does not understand Russian. The workers' job is to make building repairs in typical Russian apartments, but something goes wrong every time because they're terrible at their jobs and generally foolish, which is satirizing the current state of general disrepair in many Soviet-era buildings throughout Russia. They act like buffoons in front of their boss, who always gets so frustrated that he calls them idiots before storming out.

=== Ivan Dulin and Mikhalych ===
Ivan Dulin (Иван Дулин) is the first homosexual milling-machine operator in Russia. He works at the Chelyabinsk steel factory number 69 (the show's creators originally wanted to depict factory number 68, which actually exists, but the factory's manager refused to have it on the show; he said that there are no gays at his factory). Ivan Dulin is in love with his boss Mikhalych (Михалыч is a patronymic, his first and last names vary from season to season), who is heterosexual and refuses to sleep with Dulin. The gay miller constantly comes up with clever plots to seduce Mikhalych, but fails. At the end of most sketches, some factory workers walk in on Dulin and Mikhalych's quarrels and assume they are having sexual intercourse.

=== Sergey Belyakov ===
Sergey Yurievich Belyakov (Сергей Юрьевич Беляков) lives in Taganrog and likes to argue with his TV every evening. He is very critical of the shows he watches and always makes fun of celebrities and news reports. On nights when his wife is not at home, Belyakov sometimes watches pornography, which he also makes fun of. In the third season, he watches TV with his son, to whom he attempts to explain the shows they watch.

=== F.C. Gazmyas ===
Football club "Gazmyas" (Russian: Газмяс, or "Gasmeat") from Omsk plays in the Fourth Division and badly loses every one of their games. Their coach Evgeny Mikhailovich Kishelsky (Евгений Михайлович Кишельский) is a sadist. He enjoys beating the players up after every game, coming close to killing their goalkeeper Gatalsky (Гатальский) and forward Prokopenko (Прокопенко). "Gazmyas" is a parody of Russian football, but after the Russia national football team's EURO-2008 success, the "Gazmyas" part of the show was largely removed and jokes about Russian football in general became less common. In the third season, the team gets kicked out from the Fourth Division and becomes "Omskaya Gazmyasochka" when Kishelsky dresses his players up like women in the hopes of playing against women's teams and thus winning. However, this plan does not work either and the team still loses all of their games.

=== Ludwig Aristarkhovich ===
The concierge Ludwig Aristarkhovich (Людвиг Аристархович) lives in Saint Petersburg. Unlike all other Petersburgians, who are considered very polite and civilized, Ludwig Aristarkhovich is an elderly security guard at an apartment building who plays nasty tricks on the tenants. These tricks include leaving excrement at people's doorsteps and writing inappropriate graffiti on the walls. It's his way of avenging petty injustices, such as people not wiping their shoes before entering the building.

=== Slavik and Dimon ===
Teenagers Slavik (Славик, short for Vyacheslav) and Dimon (Димон, short for Dmitry) live in Krasnodar, where they make several unsuccessful attempts at hooking up with hot girls. Slavik is always coming up with not-so-clever plans to lure the girls in, but he is usually too scared to act these plans out himself and instead encourages Dimon to put them to life. When Dimon fails (as always), Slavik calls him "loshara" (lout) to prove that the plan was perfect, and was just poorly executed. Some of their memorable sketches include the time when the boys were too shy to buy condoms, try buying pornography at a local video store, and in the fourth season try their luck at the girls vacationing in Anapa.

=== Mamonov and Pronin ===
Politicians Yuri Venediktovich Pronin (Юрий Венедиктович Пронин) and Victor Kharitonovich Mamonov (Виктор Харитонович Мамонов) live in the fictional city of Nefteskvazhinsk (Нефтескважинск, or Oilderrickcity). All they ever talk about is how much they think of Russia and how they want to change things for the better. In reality, they are not doing anything other than living the good life and counting their money.

=== Nikolay Laptev ===
Highway patrol officer Nikolay Laptev (Николай Лаптев) from Vologda is the only honest man in his city and he never takes bribes. His wife and son secretly hate him for his honesty because it is the reason for the family's utter poverty.

=== Penza-Kopeisk Highway ===
Police officer Gavrilov (Гаврилов) and prostitute Elvira (Эльвира) work on the M5 highway (called "Penza-Kopeisk", Пенза-Копейск) and constantly get into arguments. This highway is referred to as one of the worst in Russia ("Only here can you find a pothole the size of a KaMAZ", "The workers took the secret of its construction to the grave."). The prostitute also keeps bringing up the fact that she makes a lot more money than he does.

=== Anastasia Kuznetsova ===
Waitress Anastasia Kuznetsova (Анастасия Кузнецова) works in Ivanovo ("a town with almost no men") in a sushi restaurant called "The White Willow". She is always looking for a man and is therefore only nice to the male customers. The female customers, particularly those who are there with a man, are always rudely insulted and brutally thrown out of the restaurant.

=== Snezhana Denisovna ===
Elementary school teacher Snezhana Denisovna (Снежана Денисовна) works in Voronezh. She tricks her students into bringing her money from their parents, saying that the money is going for a good cause. She also encourages her students to swear, drink, and steal. In one of the episodes she gave ecstasy to the pupils and asked if they liked the "candy" she gave them, then offered them to others for a higher price.

=== Siphon and Boroda ===
Homeless men Siphon (Сифон, lit. plumbing trap) and Boroda (Борода, lit. beard) live on the Rublyovka scrapyard. Like all the people living there, they are spoiled and they can have anything they want just by looking in the garbage bins, where they find computers, appliances, and Louis Vuitton bags. In the end of fourth season Siphon and Boroda become government officials (see Mamonov and Pronin).

=== Zhorik Vartanov and Rudik ===
Zhorik Vartanov (Жорик Вартанов) is a news anchorman, who works at the TV channel, Sev-Kav TV (Сев-Кав ТВ, from Северный Кавказ, Severnyy Kavkaz), in Pyatigorsk. He is very emotional about the stories he reports, gets into arguments with his cameraman Rudik (Рудик), swears and acts in an unprofessional manner.

=== Alexander Rodionovich Borodach ===
Alexander Rodionovich Borodach (Alexander Rodionovich "Beard-man"/ Александр Родионович Бородач) is a funny security guard and a loser who always works at a different location (supermarket "Daisy", a music store, etc.) because he cannot work anywhere longer than three days due to indestructible affliction to having fun at work - leading a "normal life" in his understanding, or compensating for lack of it - which leads to terrible violations. Boradach is a petty thief and alcohol addict, renowned in the police for stupidity and distinct lack of morals. He could be called very charismatic if he was just a wee bit smarter. He also comically emphasizes "R"'s. Example: Alexanderrr Rrrodionovich Borrrodach, the "R" in French, German and Hebrew, etc. He is always being interrogated by the police while being filmed on a hand-held camera. He is constantly beaten by the policemen with rolled up newspapers during the interrogation for comically lengthy periods of time, as indicated by the time on the video tapes.

=== Gena and Vovan from Nizhny Tagil ===
Gena (Sergei Svetlakov) and Vovan (Mihail Galustyan) are Russian tourists from Nizhny Tagil who are on vacation in Turkey. They are extremely rude and always engage in bad behavior, like destroying property, going to the bathroom in the middle of a swimming pool, and making fun of the staff and other visitors at their hotel while filming their own behavior with a camcorder. Gena's and Vovan's wives and children will sometimes also make an appearance. The sketch satirizes the stereotypical behavior of some Russian tourists abroad.

=== Dronov and Yermolkina ===
Major Yegor Sergeevich Dronov (Mikhail Galustyan) and police detective Yermolkina Yelena (Sergei Svetlakov) fight crime in their fictional hometown of Ust-Kuzminsk. Dronov constantly teaches inexperienced Yermolkina "proper police procedure", which turns out to be abuse of authority and police brutality, as well as how to cover up for rich and influential citizens of their town, who are relatives of their town's government officials. At the beginning of each sketch, Dronov is seen walking out of an interrogation room where he had just brutally beaten people for minor offenses (i.e. using public transportation without buying a ticket). He justifies his behavior to Yermolkina by citing examples of fictional cops who act the same way in movies, TV shows, and detective novels. This satirizes the fact that Russian people view their police as being brutal against normal citizens and very lenient against the rich and powerful ones.

=== Valera and Vasya ===
Football fans Vasya (Mikhail Galustyan), a fan of St. Petersburg's "Neva", and Valera (Roman Yunusov), supporter of Moscow's "Muscovite or Moskvich (Russian: Москвич)". Together they are treated at the hospital after each match as a result of the post-game riot. Always dressed in full body casts, they still manage to fight each other, being fans of opposing teams. These two football teams are fictional, but their logos are based on "Spartak Moscow" and "Zenit SPB", who are noted rivals.

=== Vadim Rudolfovich and patients ===
Doctor Vadim Rudolfovich (Sergei Svetlakov) works at a clinic where the patients are separated into two rooms: one patient's (Anna Sergeyevna) treatment is paid for by the government, while the other patient (Igor Anatolyevich) pays out of his own pocket. Accordingly, the doctor treats them differently. The rooms themselves look different as well, with the room containing Anna Sergeyevna having cracked walls, exposed wiring, uncomfortable beds and dirty floors, while the room containing Igor Anatolyevich includes a giant plasma TV and is well decorated.

=== Philip Valentinovich and Anna Viktorovna ===
Pensioners Philip Valentinovich (Sergei Svetlakov) and Anna Viktorovna gave 50 years of life working in scientific research institutes. They solve all their problems with weapons, and they don't talk. This satirizes the disregard of people of retirement age, the sketch contains black humor. To all strangers and phenomena, they are extremely aggressive, even to the innocent ones. The tango "The Weary Sun" plays at the end of the sketch.
