= Pavel Volya =

Russian TV host, actor and singer

- Павел Воля
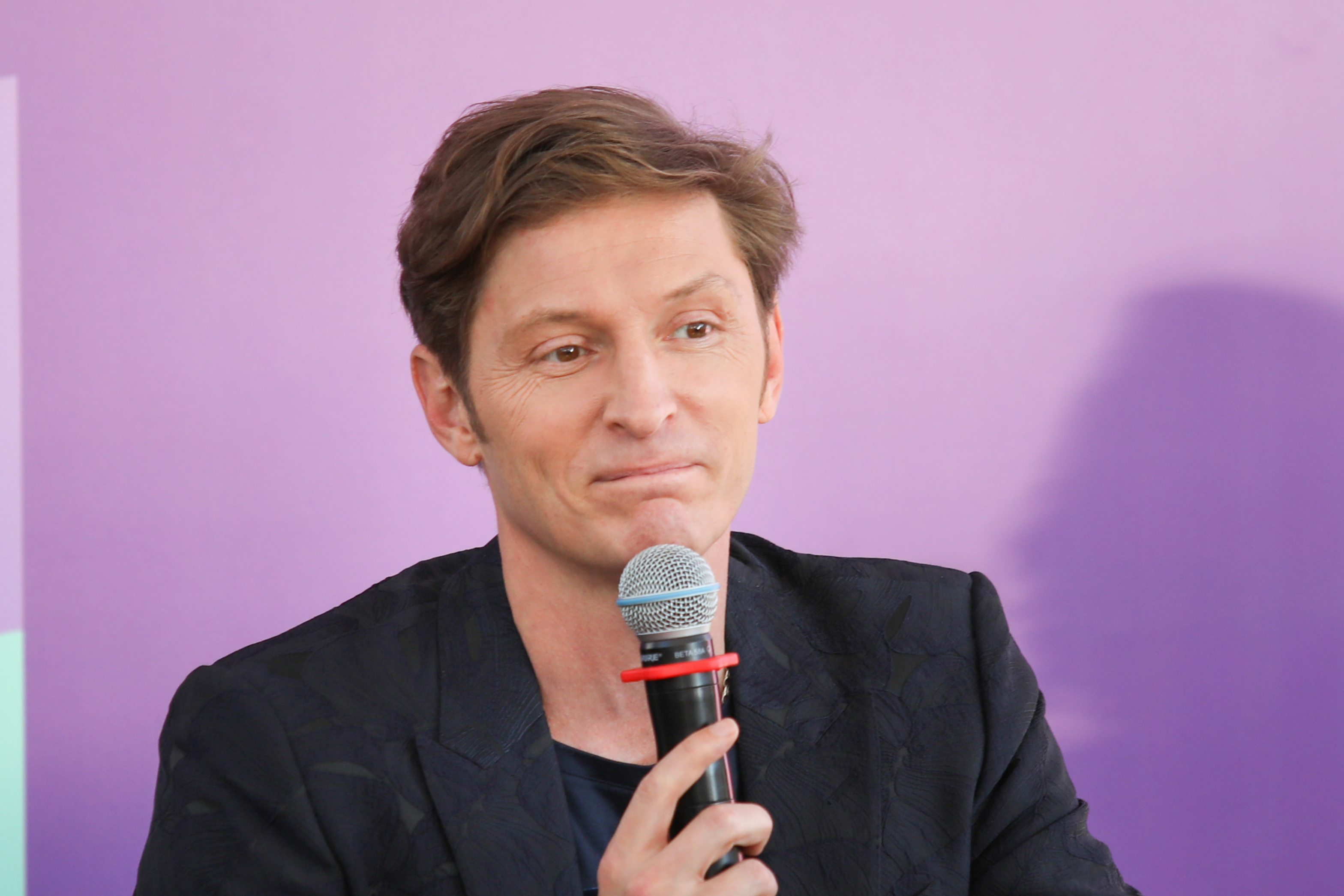
- Volya in 2022
- Born: Pavel Alekseyevich Volya; 14 March 1979 (age 46); Penza, Russian SFSR, Soviet Union
- Occupations: Actor; singer; TV host; comedian
- Spouse: Lyasan Utiasheva (m. 2012)
- Children: 2
- Website: pavelvolya.com

Pavel Volya (Russian: Павел Воля, lit. 'ˈpavʲɪl ˈvolʲə'; born 14 March 1979) is a Russian TV host, actor and singer. A former KVN player, he first came to prominence as the "resident" of the Russian Comedy Club show, co-produced by Garik Martirosyan and aired on TNT channel. In 2007, Volya released his first studio album. As of 2008, he hosts a TV Show on TNT.

== Personal life ==
Volya is married to sportswoman and TV presenter Lyasan Utiasheva. They have a son, born 14 May 2013, and a daughter, born 6 May 2015.

== Acting career ==
- 2006 – Club ("Клуб", Russian TV Series)
- 2007 – Surf's Up – Chicken Joe (Dubbing in the Russian version)
- 2008 – The Best Movie ("Самый лучший фильм") – Tima Milan
- 2008 – Plato ("Платон") – Plato
- 2009 – Bride at any Cost ("Невеста любой ценой") – Stas
- 2010 – Love in the Big City 2 ("Любовь в большом городе 2") – Hamlet The Taxi Driver
- 2011 – Kiss through a Wall ("Поцелуй сквозь стену") – Kondratyev
- 2011 – Office Romance. Our Time ("Служебный роман. Наше время") – Vadim The Secretary
- 2011 – Paul – Paul (Dubbing in the Russian version)
- 2012 – Happy New Year, My Mother! ("С новым годом, мамы!") – Son (In the storyline "To see Paris and...")
- 2024 – The Undiamond Arm – smuggler-pharmacist
