= Alexander Dulerayn =

Russian film director (born 1966)

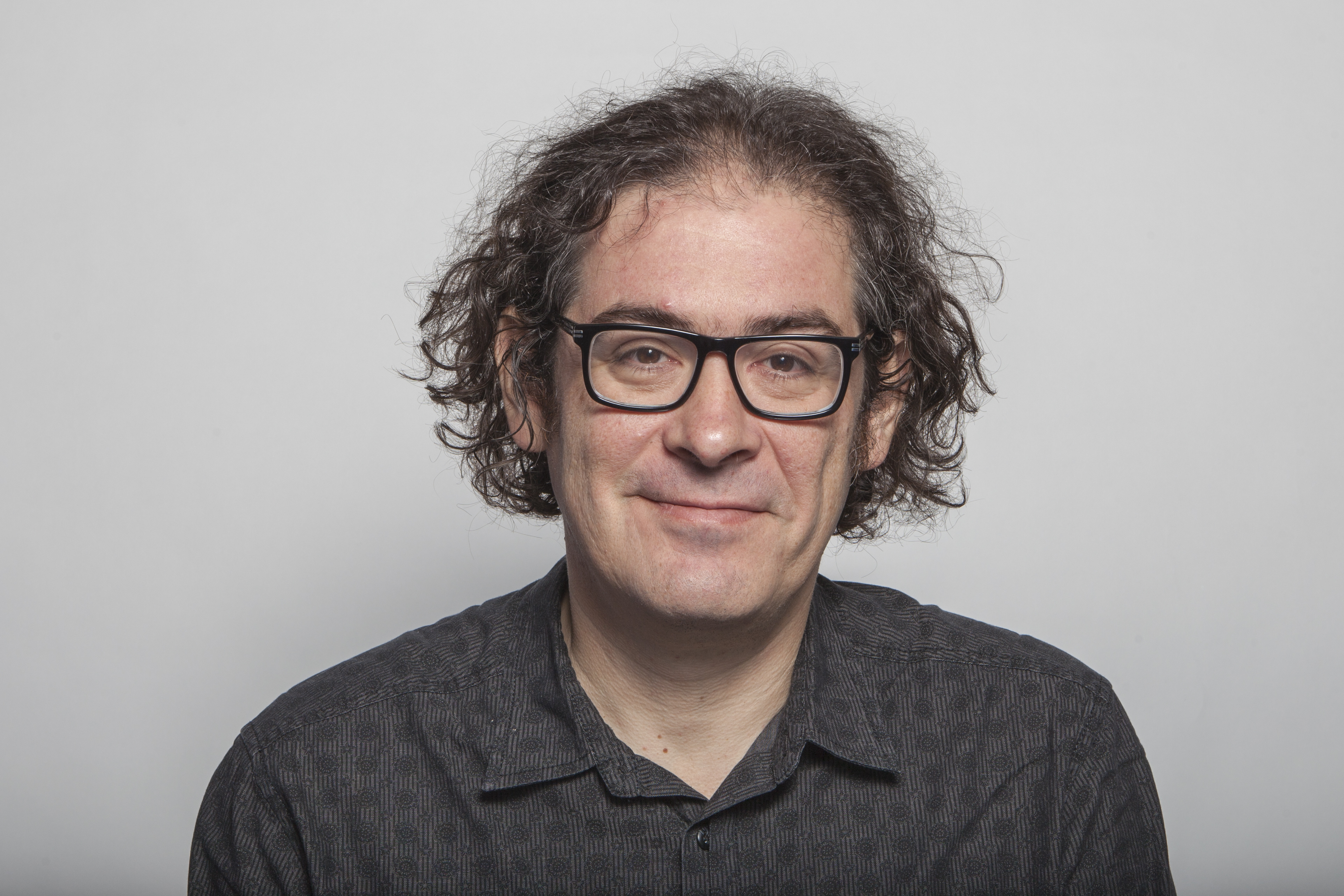
- Born: Alexander Georgievich Dulerayn; August 21, 1966 (age 59); Grozny, Checheno-Ingush Autonomous Soviet Socialist Republic, RSFSR, USSR
- Citizenship: USSR → Russia
- Occupations: Television producer, script writer, Television director
- Years active: 1990–present

Alexander Georgievich Dulerayn (Russian: Алекса́ндр Гео́ргиевич Дулера́йн; born August 21, 1966, Grozny) is an independent russian producer, director and script writer. He also was the general producer of TNT TV (2009–2021), Chief Content Officer of Storyworld Entertainment (2017–2021).

== Biography ==
Alexander Dulerayn was born on August 21, 1966, in Grozny, USSR.

== Professional career ==
Since 1991, as a producer, script writer and director, he has shot a number independent short-length films.

Alexander Dulerayn was a co-creators of 'CINE PHANTOM CLUB'.

Since 2002, he has been the Deputy General Director, Marketing Director at the TNT TV channel.

Between 2008 and 2016, Dulerayn produced and created promotional campaigns for full-length films, such as 'The Best Movie' (box office gross of RUB 400 mln over the first weekend, at the time a record-high figure for Russian film distribution), 'Our Russia. The Balls of Fate' (over RUB 375 mln) and 'The Groom' (RUB 194 mln over the first weekend).

Between 2009 and 2021 Alexander Dulerayn was the general producer of the TNT.

In 2017, the TNT audience exceeded 124 mln people. The channel was an absolute leader for the 14-44 audience for 6 years in a row and the leader for the 18-30 young audience for 7 years. In 2016–2017, TNT owned 7 out of the 10 series topping search queries on the Russian Internet.

Between 2017 and 2021 Dulerayn was the Chief Content Officer of the Storyworld Entertainment.

== Awards and honors ==
- Special prize of New York Film Academy, 1995 – 'Desire to Watch a Film by Rainer Werner Fassbinder'
- Award from the Association of Cinema and TV Producers for Best TV Mini-Series, 2019 – 'Call DiCaprio!' TV Series

== Projects ==
=== Producer of TV series ===
==== TNT ====
- RF List of People in Love (2003)
- Bunker, or the Scientist under Ground (2006)
- Univer (2008)
- Love on the Block (2008)
- Barvikha (2009)
- Interns (2010)
- The real boys (2010)
- Zaitsev+1 (2011)
- Univer. New Dorm (2011)
- Girlzzz (2012)
- Country in the Shop (2012)
- Through My Eyes (2013)
- KhB (2013)
- SashaTanya (2013)
- Studio 17 (2013)
- NonEvil (2013)
- People's Friendship (2014)
- Fizruk (2014)
- It's Always Sunny in Moscow (2014)
- La Dolce Vita (2014)
- Chernobyl: Zone of Exclusion (2014)
- Is it easy to be young? (2015)
- Laws of the Concrete Jungles (2015)
- PSC – Private Security Company (2015)
- Infidelity (2015)
- Concerned, or Love is Evil (2015)
- Beardman (2016)
- The Island (2016)
- Poor people (2016)
- Tender age crisis (2016)
- Olga (2016)
- Civil marriage (2017)
- Adaptation (2017)
- Faculty of Philology (2017)
- The Street (2017)
- Triad (2019)
- Ivanko (2020)
- Correction and punishment (2022)

==== Premier ====
- House Arrest (2018)
- Call DiCaprio (2018)
- Be Happy (2019)
- Damned days (2020)
- The Territory (2020)
- The Contact (2021)

=== Producer of Mini-series and TV films ===
==== TNT ====
- Drunk company (2016)
- Chicha from "Olga" (2020)

==== Premier ====
- Year of the pig (2018)
- To the edge of the world (2019)
- What does Slava want? (2021)
- Be my Kirill (2021)

=== Director of TV series ===
- Bunker, or the Scientist under Ground (2006, with Sergey Koryagin)
- Mental (2021, with Klim Kozinsky)

=== Script writer of TV projects ===
- Bunker, or the Scientist under Ground (2006, with Ivan Vyrypaev and Sergey Koryagin)
- Mental (2021, with Andrey Zolotarev)

=== Producer of Cinema projects ===
- Winter Spring (2004, short-length film)
- Other Block (2004, short-length film)
- Bedroom Scenes (2005, feature film)
- The Best Movie (2007, full-length feature film)
- Our Russia. The Balls of Fate (2010, full-length feature film)
- BRANDED aka Moscow 2017 (2012, full-length feature film)
- The Groom (2016, full-length feature film)
- Real boys vs zombies (2020, full-length feature film)

=== Director of Cinema projects ===
- Dachniki (Summerhouse Residents) (1991, short-length film)
- Desire to Watch a Film by Rainer Werner Fassbinder (1993, short-length film)
- 4 Objects (1995, short-length film)
- The Youth of the Design Engineer (1995, short-length film)
- Reconnaissanceman's Heroic Deed (1996, short-length film)
- Dzenboxing (1998, short-length film)
- Offshore Reserves (2004, short-length film)
- BRANDED aka Moscow 2017 (2012, full-length feature film)

=== Script writer of Cinema projects ===
- Draw (1996)
- Dzenboxing (1998, short-length film)
- Good and Bad (1999, full-length feature film)
- Ivan-Durak (2002, full-length feature film)
- BRANDED aka Moscow 2017 (2012, full-length feature film)

== Family and personal life ==
Alexander and his wife live in London with their son and daughter.
