= Levon Martirosyan =

Armenian politician (born 1976)

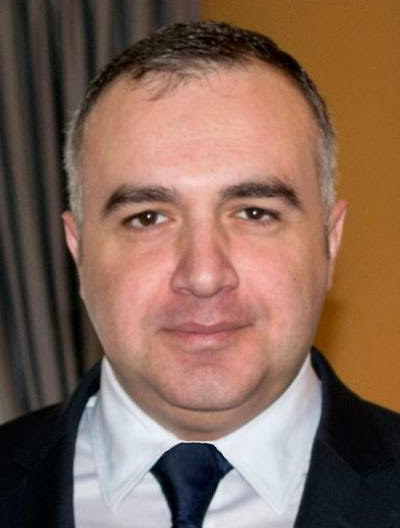
Levon Martirosyan, Julie Payette and Ann Cavoukian (cropped) - Levon Martirosyan

Levon Martirosyan was Armenia’s ambassador to Canada

He was born on February 19, 1976, in Yerevan.

== See also ==
- Armenia–Canada relations
