= Comedy Club (TV program) =

- Logo
- Also known as: Комеди клаб
- Created by: Artashes Sarkisyan
- Country of origin: Russia
- Original language: Russian
- No. of episodes: 654

Production
- Executive producers: Garik Martirosyan; Artur Janibekyan; Alexey Lyaporov (since 2012)
- Production locations: Moscow, Russia
- Production company: Comedy Club Production

Original release
- Network: TNT
- Release: April 23, 2005

Related
- Nasha Rasha

Comedy Club is a Russian stand-up comedy TV show broadcast by the Russian TNT channel since January, 2001.

Long-time residents of the club are Garik Martirosyan, Timur Batrutdinov, Garik Kharlamov, Pavel Volya, Alexandr Revva, Marina Kravets and others. The show host is Garik Martirosyan.

Comedy Club headquarters is located in Moscow.

== Russia, Ukraine and Belarus ==
United URS Comedy

Comedy Club has developed spin offs in Ukraine (Real Comedy), Belarus (Comedy Club Belarus), St Petersburg (Comedy Club Peter-style), Nizhny Novgorod (Comedy Club Gorky Style), Rostov-on-Don (Comedy Club Rostov-style). The residents of the developed branches perform regularly in Moscow and some like "Elvis" from the Peter-style, the "Chekhov duet" from Ukraine are even shown on TNT channel. On April 29, 2007 in Comedy Club Moscow an African - Lubinda from the Rostov-style debuted signaling the internationalizing of Comedy Club.

== Residents ==
=== Current ===
- Garik Martirosyan - represents "residents" of the Comedy Club. In 2010-2015 he was the leading show. Since 2005.
- Pavel Volya - the current show host, performances in the genre Stand Up, miniatures, improvisation (usually in the course of communication with celebrities present in the hall). Since 2005.
- Garik Kharlamov - since March 14, 2015 co-host Pavel Volya in conversation with the invited stars, appears in miniatures, most often together with Timur Batrutdinov
- Timur Batrutdinov - miniatures (often with Garik Kharlamov). From January 16 to March 7, 2015, was co-host Will in a conversation with the stars. Characters: candidate for deputy Yegor Batrudov, Valery Alevdinovich Babushkin. Since 2005.
- Aleksandr Revva - miniatures. Characters: Arthur Pirozhkov, Don Digidon, grandmother, Super Stas, magician-illusionist. From 2005 to 2013, he returned to the program in 2015.
- Alexander Nezlobin - his own humorous monologue, sometimes miniatures. Also in 2010 he led the column "Good evening, Mars!" With Igor Meerson. Since September 13, 2006.
- Dmitry "Lusyok" Sorokin, Zurab Matua and Andrey Averin - musical sketches, musical experiments, former members of the group "Lips." Sorokin since 2005, Matua and Averin - since 2007.
- Marina Kravets - miniatures, usually with Andrei Averin, Zurab Matua and Dmitry Sorokin, as well as with other members of the Comedy Club. Since the year 2009.
- Dmitry Grachov - miniatures, mostly parodies Vladimir Putin. Usually with Dmitry Sorokin, Zurab Matua, Andrey Averin, Garik Martirosyan, Garik Kharlamov and Timur Batrutdinov. Since 2010.
- Sergey Gorelikov ("Serge Gorely") is a member of the group "United Sexy Boys" (under the pseudonym of Turbo). From 2010 to 2015 and from 2017 leads the rubric "Preliminary caresses". Since May 14, 2010.
- Mikhail Galustyan - miniatures. Appears mainly in special issues as a guest. Since 2010.
- Sergey Mokhnachev ("Sergey Bessmertny") - resident in 2006-2011.
- Demis Karibidis and Andrey Skorokhod - miniatures. Also in 2013, Karibov led his rubric "Foreign Languages". Karibov - since March 2011, Skorokhod - since 2013.
- The trio "Smirnov, Ivanov, Sobolev" (Ilya Sobolev, Anton "Banderas" Ivanov and Alexei "Smirnyaga" Smirnov) - miniatures. Former members of the "lethal league". Since November 2013.
- Duet "YES!" (Mahmud Huseynov and Magomed Murtazaliev) are miniatures. Winners of Comedy Battle. Since December 2013.
- Ivan Pyshnenko and Dmitry Kozhoma - miniatures, usually with Marina Kravets, Andrei Skorokhod and Demis Karibidis. Since March, 2014.
- Andrey Beburishvili - performances in the genre Stand Up. Winner of Comedy Battle. Since December 2014.
- Yevgeny "Zhenya" Sinyakov - performances in the genre Stand up with a screen. Participant of Comedy Battle. Since December 2015.
- The trio "The Crisis of Genre" (Igor "Gar" Dmitriev, Vasily Zinin, Nikolai Tereshchenko) - miniatures. Participants of the Comedy Battle. Since December 2015.
- The trio "Tommy Lee Jones" (Arthur Dadashev, Islam Kantayev, Ibrahim Baisagurov) - miniatures. Winners of Comedy Battle. Since December 2015.

=== Groups ===
- "Lips" is a singing merry song folk group, founded in 2007 by Timur Batrutdinov, Roman Yunusov, Havre, Garik Kharlamov, Andrei Averin, Dmitry Sorokin and other residents.
- "Jukebox" - Acted in the Comedy Club in 2008, 2010 and 2015.
- "United Sexy Boyz" (abbreviated to "USB") is a band that has been parodying variety music since 2010. The stage image is a group "banned on all TV and radio channels of Russia", allegedly recording an album a week and making clips to it. Also from 2014, besides clips, parody known things like full-length films, television series, commercials, cartoons, fragments of news releases and plots of various TV channels, entries in Internet blogs, video and computer games begin to parody. Clips begin with the phrase Dyushi Metelkin "USB here. Here everything: Nikita, Stas, Gena, Turbo and Dyusha Metolkin. " Members of the group: Nikita (Konstantin Malasayev) - every phrase begins with the words: "And I'm Nikita ...", followed by a joke, usually on a subway / homosexual topic. Gena (Dmitry Vyushkin) - always silent. Stas (Andrey Shelkov) - every phrase begins with the words: "Let me say, yeah ...". Turbo (Sergey Gorelikov) - each phrase begins with the words "Listen, Host!", Often comparing Martirosyan / Volya / Kharlamov with incompatible things and phenomena. Dyusha Metelkin (Andrey Minin) is the leader of the group. Operates style of clothes and behavior of foreign rap artists.
- "The Nest Band." The main part of the group includes: Alexander Nezlobin, Igor "Elvis" Meerson, Marina Kravets, Alexei Smirnov. It was founded in 2010.

== Production ==
Film crew

Directed by Roman Novikov (2010 – present).

Location

From 2005 to 2017, the filming of the Comedy Club took place at the Golden Palace. In September 2017, the project moved to the Barvikha Luxury Village concert hall, and only test parties remained in the Golden Palace.

Producers

Alexey Lyaporov, Alexey Poymanov, Ilya Romanko, Sergey Mokhnachev. Garik Martirosyan (2005-2017), Tash Sargsyan (2003-2005).

== See also ==
- The Best Movie
- Our Russia. The Balls of Fate
