= The Best Movie 2 =

- Directed by: Oleg Fomin
- Written by: Artak Gasparyan; Garic Kharlamov
- Starring: Garik Kharlamov; Mikhail Galustyan; Timur Batrudinov; Evgeniy Vereschagin; Dmitriy Khrustalyov
- Production companies: Monumental Pictures; Columbia Pictures; Comedy Club Production
- Distributed by: Walt Disney Studios Sony Pictures Releasing CIS
- Release date: January 22, 2009
- Running time: 80 minutes
- Country: Russia
- Language: Russian
- Budget: RUR 10 million

The Best Movie 2 (Russian: Самый лучший фильм 2, romanized: Samiy luchshiy film 2) is a 2009 Russian comedy from Monumental Pictures (Sony Pictures Entertainment) and Comedy Club Production, continuation of 2008 The Best Movie film, spoofing such famous Russian films as Zhara, The Irony of Fate 2 and TV-programs: Malakhov+, King of Ring and Taxi.

== Plot ==
Four friends—Sailor, Actor, Dimati, and Major—reunite after a long separation at a café to celebrate Major's birthday. However, the celebration is cut short when Major is suddenly kidnapped, and his captors demand a hefty ransom of 1,000,000 euros from his friends.

The friends embark on separate quests to gather the ransom money: Sailor heads to Saint Petersburg to sell someone else's apartment, where Muscovites with a fondness for alcohol are welcome; Dimati spends the entire movie fleeing angry skinheads due to his skin color; Major grows anxious and repeatedly tries to escape, with each attempt failing; and Actor takes part in various TV shows to earn money.

After their attempts to collect the ransom fail, Sailor, Dimati, and Actor regroup by a lake. They decide to travel back in time to prevent Major from getting into the kidnappers’ car. However, they accidentally end up in 1772, during the reign of Catherine the Great, where they steal her crown. Returning to the present with the crown, they approach Major's captors, only to find out the entire kidnapping was a prank orchestrated by Major's father to ensure his friends valued him for more than his money.

== Cast ==
- Garik Kharlamov as Sailor
- Mikhail Galustyan as Catherine II
- Evgeniy Vereschagin as Majore
- Timur Batrudinov as Actor
- Dmitry Khrustalyov as Dimaty
- Dmitry Nagiev as Gennady Malakhov / Afanasy Uzda, a hermit healer from Khabarovsk Krai / appraiser Speizman
- Tatyana Lyutaeva as Nadezhda Vasilyevna Shevelyova
- Aleksandr Chislov as Adolf Hitler
- Mikhail Yefremov as Aleksandr Olegovich, Sailor's father
- Aleksandr Bashirov as Afanasy Grigoryevich, Majore's father
- Sergey Lazarev as himself (cameo appearance)
- Fyodor Bondarchuk as himself (cameo appearance)
- Aleksei Panin as himself (cameo appearance)
- Yuri Galtsev as the herald
