= Mikhail Galustyan =

Russian comedian (born 1979)

- Михаил Галустян
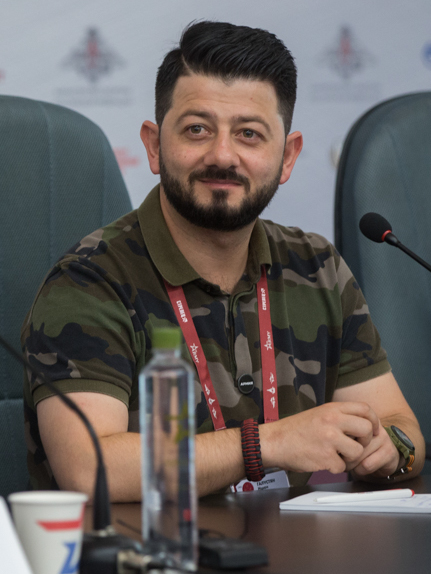
- Galustyan in 2016
- Born: Nshan Sergeyevich Galustyan; October 25, 1979 (age 46); Sochi, Soviet Russia, USSR
- Citizenship: Russian; Armenian (since 2023)
- Occupations: Showman, humorist, comedian, screenwriter, producer
- Years active: 1999-present
- Television: KVN

Nshan Sergeyevich Galustyan (Russian: Ншан Сергеевич Галустян, Armenian: Նշան Սերգեյի Գալուստյան, romanized: Nshan Sergeyi Galustyan; born October 25, 1979), known professionally as Mikhail Galustyan (Russian: Михаил Галустян) is a Russian showman, comedian, screenwriter, and producer. Mikhail Galustyan was also a former participant in KVN and a show called Comedy Club. Awards Champion League KVN 2003, Winner of the Summer Cup of KVN 2004, 2005, 2009.

== Biography ==
Galustyan was born in the resort town of Sochi, Krasnodar Krai, Russian SFSR, Soviet Union in southern Russia. Galusyan's ethnology roots back to the city of Trabzon in modern Turkey, which used to be populated by a large Armenian community. His paternal grandfather, along with his 12 siblings escaped the Armenian Genocide during the early years of the 20th century and moved to Sochi, what was a Black Sea coastal town in the Russian Empire. Galustyan's mother originates from Armenia. Being ethnically Armenian, Galustyan is of Hemshin origin, a branch of the ethnic Armenians who in the past or present have been affiliated with the Hemşin district in the province of Rize, Turkey.

After graduating from college, Galustyan entered the Sochi State University of Tourism and Resort Business with a focus in Social Pedagogy. Galustyan was eventually expelled from the institute for serious lapse in attendance.

Galustyan is one of the Judges in the reality competition TV program Humor the comedian. (Рассмеши комика) on TV channel "Inter" (Ukraine).

In 2011, Mikhail became a student of the Kutafin Moscow State Law University.

Galustyan was a torchbearer for the 2014 Winter Olympics in his hometown of Sochi. He participated on the last day of the torch relay from Olympia to Sochi in what has been recognized as the largest and longest relay in the history of the Winter Olympics. Galustyan stated, "I'm proud and delighted that I helped my country and my hometown Sochi welcome the 22nd Winter Olympic games."

He appeared in the first season of ice show contest Ice Age.

=== Sanctions ===
In February 2023 Canada sanctioned Mikhail Galustyan for being involved in Russian propaganda and spreading misinformation relating to the Russian invasion of Ukraine.

== Awards ==
- 1995 - the Champion of KVN Sochi
- 1996 - the Premium "For acting" Moscow
- 1998 - Award "Ovation", Saint-Petersburg
- 1999 - Prize "Overcome!" Moscow
- 2000 - Prize "For hard work" Moscow
- 2003 - Champion of the Highest league of KVN Moscow
- 2008 - the Cup of "the Legend of KVN" Moscow
- 2008 - Was nominated in the "MTV Russia Movie Awards" for the best comedy role, but the award has not received
- 2009 - Summer cup of KVN "In the style of a Retro" (Sochi)

== Filmography ==
1. 2006 Spanish voyage of Stepanycha as Yanychar
2. 2008 The Best Movie as «Polkilo»
3. 2008 Hitler goes Kaput! as guerrilla Rabinovich
4. 2008 Kung Fu Panda as Po (Russian dubbing-in)
5. 2009 The Best Movie 2 as ru:Екатерина II
6. 2010 Our Russia. The Balls of Fate as Ravshan / «Beard» / Dimon / Alyona (friend of the bride)
7. 2011 Zaytsev+1 as Feodor (main role)
8. 2011 Kung Fu Panda 2 as Po (Russian dubbing-in)
9. 2011 Pregnant as Zhora
10. 2012 Rzhevsky versus Napoleon as Marquis de Mazo-sad
11. 2012 That still Karlosson! as Karlsson
12. 2014 8 New Dates as Timur
13. 2015 A Warrior's Tail as Semi-Baron Fafl (voice)
14. 2015 Brigadier as Kesha Black
15. 2017 Kolobanga as Trojan (voice)
16. 2022 Summer Time: Travel Back as Sergey Sergeyevich Kurochkin
17. 2024 The Undiamond Arm as smuggler-pharmacist's assistant

=== Television ===
1. 2006 — Nasha Russia — various roles (see below)
2. 2007 — Happy Together — cameo
3. Lednikoviy Period (2008, 2009, 2 and 3 seasons)
4. Prozhektorperiskhilton (2008)
5. ru:Рассмеши комика (since 2011)
6. ru:Стенка на стенку (2008)
7. Kto khochet stat' millionerom? (Who Wants to become a Millionaire) (2010)
8. ru:Пока все дома (2008)
9. Bolshie gonki (2008)
10. Comedy Club (since 2006)
11. ru:Кино в деталях (2010)

== Roles in Nasha Russia ==
1. Ravshan - Tajik builder (Moscow & Sochi)
2. Ludwig Aristarchovich - concierge, (St. Petersburg)
3. Eugene (Gennady) Mikhailovich Kishelskiy - the trainer of Omsk football clubs ГазМяс (GazMyas, lit. means Gas Meat) and later, of the women's club ГазМясочка (GazMyasochka)
4. Mikhalich - the shop chief of pipe-rolling plant No.69 (Chelyabinsk) - in the first season, his name was Igor Mikhalich, in the 2nd and 3rd season Alexey, and in the 4th his name was Victor Mikhailovich Oreshkin.
5. Dimon - teenager (Krasnodar)
6. Anastasia Kuznetsova - the waitress at the sushi bar (Ivanovo). In the film, the character is named Alena.
7. Gavrilov - inspector of traffic police on the Penza-Kopeysk highway
8. Victor Haritonovich Mamonov - Duma representative of Nefteskvazhinsk (a fictional town)
9. Boroda ("beard") - tramp (Rublyovka)
10. Zhorik Vartanov - presenter on the "Sev-Kav TV" (Pyatigorsk)
11. Egor Sergeevich Dronov - major of militia (Ust-Kuzminsk, fictional town in Krasnoyarsk Krai)
12. Vovan is a tourist from Nizhny Tagil visiting Turkey
13. Alexander Rodionovich Borodach - a former security guard of Kseniya Sobchak (Ryazan).
14. Valera - neighbor of Sergei Belyakov (Taganrog).
15. Vasiliy - fan of football club "Neva" (Saint-Petersburg).
