= Semyon Slepakov =

Russian-Israeli comedian (born 1979)

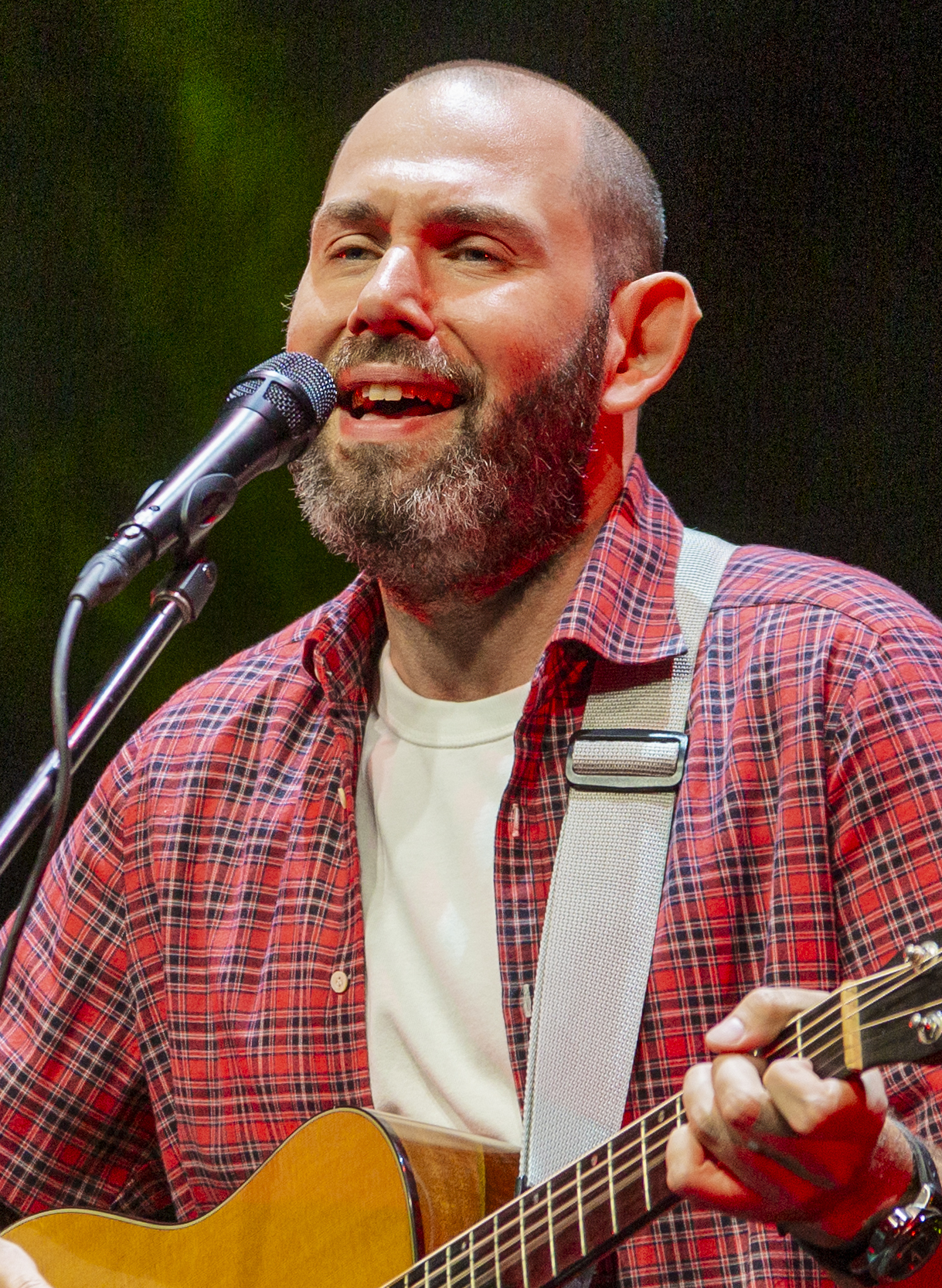
- Slepakov in 2022

Background information
- Born: 23 August 1979 (age 47); Pyatigorsk, Stavropol Krai, RSFSR, Soviet Union
- Occupations: Singer-songwriter, comedian, actor, producer, screenwriter

Semyon Sergeyevich Slepakov (Russian: Семён Серге́евич Слепако́в; born 23 August 1979 in Pyatigorsk) is a Russian producer, screenwriter and show-runner.

Winner of the Nika Award (2019).

== Biography ==
Slepakov is a Russian - Israeli comedian and writer. He was born on August 23, 1979, in Pyatigorsk, Stavropol Krai and raised in a Jewish family. He holds both Russian and Israeli citizenship.

In 2005, he moved to in Moscow. He moved to Israel in October 2022 and was threatened with arrest by Russian authorities for releasing a song critical of the Russian invasion of Ukraine.

== Filmography ==
=== As actor ===
- 2010 — Our Russia. The Balls of Fate
- 2020 — Dead Souls
- 2021 — BOOMERang

=== As playwright ===
- 2008 — Univer
- 2010 — Our Russia. The Balls of Fate
- 2018 — House Arrest
