= Gevorg =

Gevorg (Armenian: Գևորգ), also spelled Gevork and pronounced and transliterated as Kevork in Western Armenian, is the Armenian version of the name George. Notable people with the name include:

== Gevorg ==
=== Given name ===
- Gevorg Abajian (1920–2002), Armenian literary critic
- Gevorg Aleksanyan (born 1981), Armenian weightlifter
- Gevorg Alikhanyan (1897–1938), Armenian Soviet politician and statesman
- Gevorg Arutyunyan (born 1997), Russian-Armenian footballer
- Gevorg Avagyan (1922–2013), Soviet Armenian painter
- Gevorg Badalyan (born 1991), Armenian footballer
- Gevorg Bashinjaghian (1857–1925), Armenian painter
- Gevorg Dabaghyan (born 1965), Armenian folk musician
- Gevorg Davtyan (born 1983), Armenian weightlifter
- Gevorg Emin (1918–1998), Armenian writer
- Gevorg Geodakyan (1928–2015), Armenian musicologist
- Gevorg Gharadjian (1861–1936), Armenian political activist and revolutionary
- Gevorg Gharibyan (born 2002), Armenian wrestler
- Gevorg Ghazaryan (born 1988), Armenian football player
- Gevorg Ghazaryan, 20th-century Armenian politician
- Gevorg Gorgisyan (born 1986), Armenian politician and parliamentarian
- Gevorg Harutjunyan (born 1981), Armenian chess grandmaster
- Gevorg Harutyunyan (born 1990), Armenian singer
- Gevorg Hovhannisyan (born 1983), Armenian footballer
- Gevorg Jahukyan (1920–2005), Armenian linguist and philologist
- Gevorg Karapetyan (born 1963), Lebanese-Armenian footballer
- Gevorg Karapetyan (born 1990), Armenian footballer
- Gevorg Kasparov (born 1980), Armenian footballer and coach
- Gevorg Khachatrian (1936–1996), Armenian scientist, teacher and engineer
- Gevorg Manukian (born 1993), Armenian-born Ukrainian boxer
- Gevorg Martirosyan, Armenian singer and actor
- Gevorg Melik-Karagyozyan, 20th-century Armenian politician
- Gevorg Najaryan (born 1998), Kazakh footballer of Armenian descent
- Gevorg Petrosyan (born 1972), Armenian lawyer and politician
- Gevorg Petrosyan (born 1985), Armenian-Italian kickboxer
- Gevorg Sahakyan (born 1990), Polish wrestler of Armenian origin
- Gevorg Sargsyan (born 1981), Armenian conductor
- Gevorg Tamamyan, Armenian doctor
- Gevorg Tarakhchyan (born 2002), Armenian footballer

=== Middle name ===
- Ervand Gevorg Kogbetliantz (1888–1974), Armenian-American mathematician
- Tigran Gevorg Martirosyan (born 1988), Armenian weightlifter

=== Mononym ===
- Gevorg II of Armenia, 9th-century Armenian bishop
- Gevorg V of Armenia (1847–1930), Armenian religious leader
- Gevorg VI of Armenia (1868–1954), Armenian religious leader

== Gevork ==
- Gevork Kotiantz (1909–1996), Russian-Armenian painter
- Gevork Minaskanian, American professor and pharmacologist
- Gevork Sarkisyan (born 1999), Russian footballer of Armenian descent
- Gevork Vartanian (1924–2012), Soviet intelligence agent

== Kevork ==
- Kevork Ajemian (1932–1998), Armenian writer, journalist, novelist, theorist and public activist, one of the founders of ASALA
- Kevork Aslan (1849–?), Armenian historian
- Kevork Chavush (1865–1907), Armenian fedayi in the Ottoman Empire
- Kevork Hovnanian (1923–2009), Iraqi-born Armenian-American businessman and home builder, who founded Hovnanian Enterprises in 1959
- Kevork Malikyan (born 1943), English character actor of Armenian descent; played Kazim in Indiana Jones and the Last Crusade
- Kevork Mardikian (born 1954), Syrian footballer
- Kevork Mardirossian (1954–2024), American violinist
- Kevork Shadoyan (born 1974), Syrian-Armenian fashion designer

== Other uses ==
- Sourp Kevork Church, Limassol, Cyprus
- St. Gevorg Church (disambiguation), multiple churches in Armenia
- Gevorg Marzpetuni (novel), an 1896 Armenian novel
- Oh, Gevorg, a 1979 Soviet film

== See also ==
- Gevorgyan, a surname derived from the name
