= Ministry of Education, Science, Culture and Sports (Armenia) =

Government ministry of Armenia

- Կրթության, գիտության, մշակույթի և սպորտի նախարարություն

Agency overview
- Formed: 1918
- Jurisdiction: Government of Armenia
- Headquarters: 3 Vazgen Sargsyan, Yerevan 0010, Yerevan
- Minister responsible: Zhanna Andreasyan, Minister of Education, Science, Culture and Sports
- Website: escs.gov.am

The Ministry of Education, Science, Culture and Sports of Armenia (MoESCS) (Armenian: Կրթության, գիտության, մշակույթի և սպորտի նախարարություն) is the Armenian state body of executive authority, which elaborates and implements the policies set out by the Government of Armenia in the education, science, culture, sports and youth policy sectors.

== History ==
=== Recent structural changes ===
As of June 2019, the Ministry of Education and Science and the Ministry of Culture have merged.

=== Ministry of Education and Science ===
The history of the Ministry of Education and Science is best separated into three periods.

Beginning with the First Republic, the Ministry was formed on 24 July 1918 when the National Council released the composition of the Supreme Executive Body. Not long after in 1919, requested by then Minister Gevorg Karagyozyan, the Ministry would expand to include arts and antiquities.

This structure would follow into the Soviet period, when by decree of the ASSR Revolutionary Council the People's Commissariat of Enlightenment was established. Besides being renamed to the Ministry of Enlightenment, this system would persist until 1973. Afterwards, elements of the Ministry were formed into the Ministry of Higher and Vocational Education. This split would be reverted in 1988 by the ASSR Supreme Council, which resulted in the establishment of the Ministry of National Education. The Ministry of National Education did not last long though. Another ASSR Supreme Council decision in late 1990 led to the split into the Ministry of Enlightenment and State Committee for Higher Education and Science.

Following Armenian independence and the formation of the Republic of Armenia, in 1992 the State Committee for Higher Education and Science was reorganized into the Ministry of Higher Education and Science. In 1995, the Ministry of Enlightenment and prior would be merged into the Ministry of Education and Science.

=== Ministry of Culture ===
The history of the Ministry of Culture is more convoluted. Ultimately only being established in 1953 during the Armenian Soviet Socialist Republic, its sectors of authority and structure predated this formation.

Before the Ministry's establishment it was part of the predecessors of the Ministry of Education and Science. However, it is to be emphasized that the Ministry of Education and Science still precedes those structures. In the first year of the First Republic of Armenia's existence, there was no administrative body in charge of cultural affairs. Like stated in the section on the Ministry of Education and Science, this jurisdiction was added to it in 1919.

Even into the Soviet administration, cultural affairs would stay departments of subsequent executive offices for education. This would change with the establishment of the Ministry of Culture in 1953. Given the task of implementation and management of affairs in the field of Culture, Enlightenment, Theatre, Music and Arts.

Besides name changes and minor restructuring following Armenia's independence, the Ministry would persist until 2019.

== List ==
=== First Republic of Armenia (1918–1920) ===
Minister	Term start	Term end	Head of Government
Mikayel Atabekyan	November	December	Hovhannes Kajaznuni
Gevorg Melik-Gharagyozyan	December	June	Hovhannes Kajaznuni
Sirakan Tigranyan	June	August	Alexander Khatisian
Nikol Aghbalyan	August	May	Alexander Khatisian
Gevorg Ghazaryan	May 5, 1920	November 23, 1920	Hamo Ohanjanyan
Vahan Minakhoryan	November 23, 1920	2 December 1920	Simon Vratsyan

=== Soviet Period (1920–1991) ===
Minister	Term start	Term end	Head of Government
Suren Mikayelyan	1949	1954	Sahak Karapetyan
Shavarsh Simonyan	1954	1973	Anton Kochinyan
Semyon Hakhumyan	1973	1988	Grigory Arzumanyan
Lyudvig Gharibjanyan	1975	1988	Grigory Arzumanyan
Semyon Hakhumyan	1988	1989	Vladimir Markaryants
Misak Davtyan	1989	1990	Vladimir Markaryants
Vilik Harutyunyan	1990	1991	Vazgen Manukyan
Areg Grigoryan	1990	1992	Vazgen Manukyan Gagik Harutyunyan

=== Third Republic of Armenia (1991–present) ===
Minister	Term start	Term end	Prime Minister
Vardges Gnuni	1991	1991	Vazgen Manukyan Gagik Harutyunyan Khosrov Harutyunyan Hrant Bagratyan
Hayk Ghazaryan	1992	1994	Hrant Bagratyan
Ashot Bleyan	1994	1995	Hrant Bagratyan
Armenak Ghazaryan	1995	1995	Hrant Bagratyan
Vardges Gnuni	1996	1996	Armen Sarkissian
Artashes Petrosyan	1996	1998	Armen Sarkissian Robert Kocharyan
Levon Mkrtchyan	1998	1999	Robert Kocharyan Armen Darbinyan
Eduard Ghazaryan	1999	2001	Vazgen Sargsyan Aram Sargsyan Andranik Margaryan
Levon Mkrtchyan	2001	2003	Andranik Margaryan
Sergo Yeritsyan	2003	2006	Andranik Margaryan
Levon Mkrtchyan	2006	2008	Serzh Sargsyan
Spartak Seyranyan	2008	2009	Tigran Sargsyan
Armen Ashotyan	2009	2016	Tigran Sargsyan Hovik Abrahamyan
Levon Mkrtchyan	2016	2018	Karen Karapetyan Serzh Sargsyan
Arayik Harutyunyan	2018	2019	Nikol Pashinyan
Arayik Harutyunyan	2019	2020	Nikol Pashinyan
Vahram Dumanyan	2020	2022	Nikol Pashinyan
Zhanna Andreasyan	December 2022	Incumbent	Nikol Pashinyan

== Name changes ==
Before the 2019 merger, both ministries experienced several name changes. These name changes being primarily of stylistic nature rather than following changes in their sectors of executive authority; (exceptions mentioned prior).

- Ministry of Education and Science:
  - July 1918 - June 1919 → Ministry of Public Education
  - July 1919 - Nov. 1920 → Ministry of Public Education and Arts
  - Dec. 1920 - 1946 → People's Commissariat of Enlightenment
  - 1946 - 1988 → Ministry of Enlightenment
  - 1988 - 1990 → Ministry of National Education
  - 1990 - 1995 → Ministry of Enlightenment
  - 1995 - July 2019 → Ministry of Education and Science
- Ministry of Culture:
  - July 1919 - 1920 → (Part of) Ministry of Public Education and Arts
  - Dec. 1920 - 1936 → (Arts Department of) People's Commissariat of Enlightenment
  - 1936 - Apr. 1953 → Department of Arts Affairs (of the ASSR People's Council)
  - Apr. 1953 - Nov. 1996 → Ministry of Culture
  - Nov. 1996 - June 2003 → Ministry of Culture, Youth Affairs and Sports
  - June 2003 - May 2006 → Ministry of Culture and Youth Affairs
  - May 2006 - July 2019 → Ministry of Culture

== See also ==
- Culture of Armenia
- Education in Armenia
- Science and technology in Armenia
- Sports in Armenia
