= St. Gevorg Church =

St. Gevorg Church may refer to several former Armenian churches in the Nakhchivan Autonomous Republic of Azerbaijan:

- St. Gevorg Church (Disar), in Ordubad district
- St. Gevorg Church (Julfa), in Gulustan
- St. Gevorg Church (Nakhchivan) in the city of Nakhchivan
- St. Gevorg Church (Nor Poradasht), in Julfa district

== See also ==
- Surp Gevork Church, Kosh, Armenia
- St George's Church (disambiguation)
- St. Gevorg Monastery (Khanagah)
- Sourp Kevork Church, Limassol, Cyprus
