= Armen Ashotyan =

Armenian politician

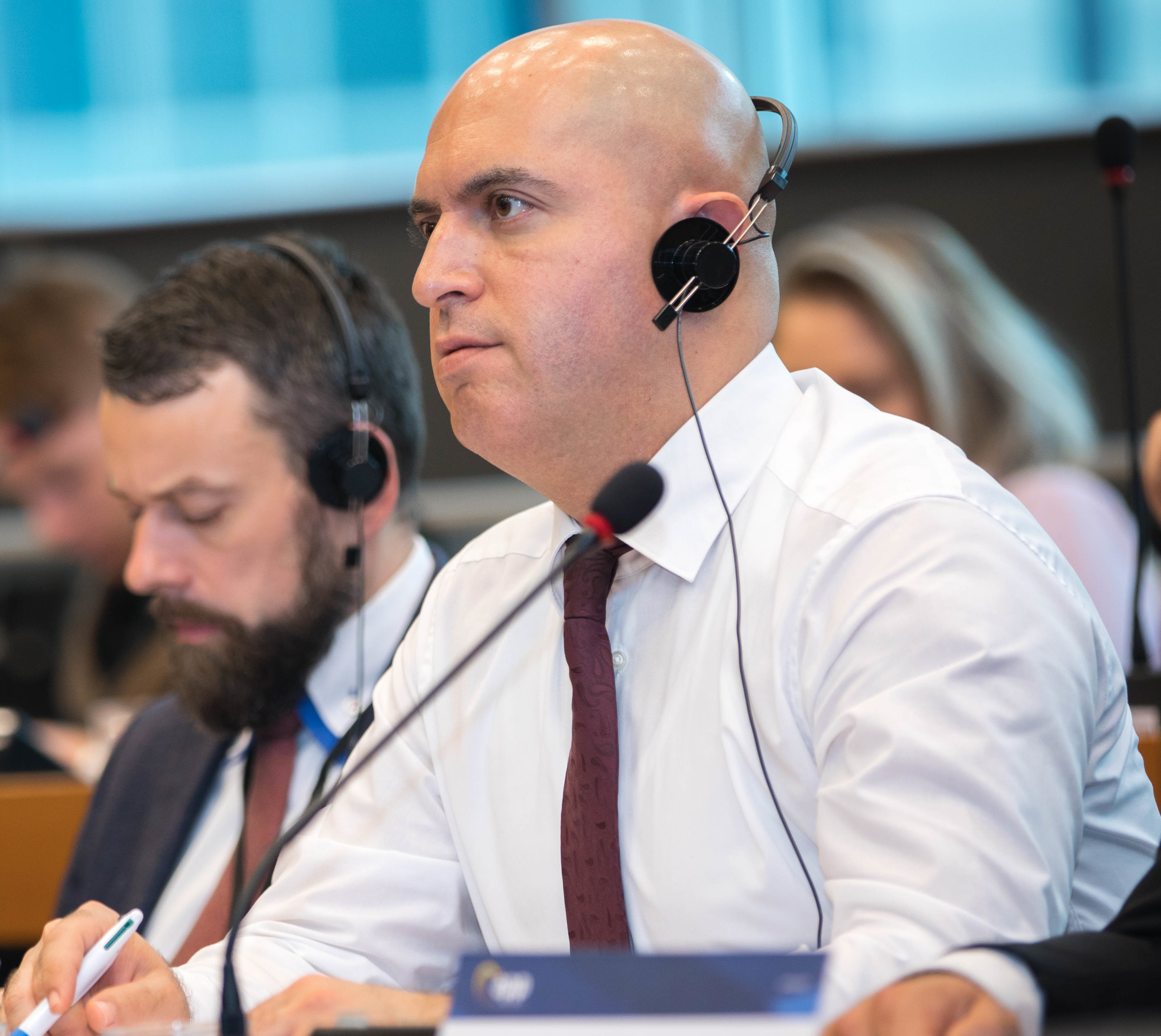

Minister of Education and Science
- In office May 12, 2009 – February 24, 2016
- President: Serzh Sargsyan
- Prime Minister: Tigran Sargsyan; Hovik Abrahamyan
- Preceded by: Spartak Seyranyan
- Succeeded by: Levon Mkrtchyan

Member of the National Assembly
- In office 2005–2009
- In office 2017–2018

Personal details
- Born: July 25, 1975 (age 51) Yerevan, Armenian SSR, Soviet Union
- Party: Republican Party of Armenia
- Education: Yerevan State Medical University
- Occupation: Politician

Armen Gevorgi Ashotyan (Armenian: Արմեն Գևորգի Աշոտյան; born July 25, 1975) is an Armenian politician who served as Minister of Education and Science of Armenia from 2009 to 2016. He is currently deputy chairman of the Republican Party of Armenia.

== Early life and education ==
Armen Ashotyan was born in Yerevan in 1975. He graduated from the Faculty of General Practice of the Mkhitar Heratsi Yerevan State Medical University (YSMU) with a specialization in general medicine in 1998. In 2000, he received his clinical residency training from the same university with a specialization in forensic medicine. Ashotyan graduated from the Moscow School of Political Science in 2005.

== Career ==
Ashotyan joined the Republican Party of Armenia (RPA) in 2002 and from 2003 to 2005 served as the chairman of its youth wing. Ashotyan was first elected to the National Assembly of Armenia in 2005 by the proportional system of voting, and was a member of the RPA's parliamentary faction. He was a member of the Standing Committee on Social Affairs, Health Care and Environment. On May 12, 2007 he was elected to the National Assembly again as a member of the RPA's electoral list. On May 12, 2009 he was appointed Minister of Education and Science of Armenia.

In September 2020, when the Second Karabakh War broke out, he was called into the Armenian armed forces and served in the medical corps for the duration of the conflict. Since the end of the conflict, he has been instrumental in leading anti-government protests that seek to oust Prime Minister Nikol Pashinyan.

He was arrested on abuse of power and money laundering charges on 15 June 2023.

== Personal life ==
Ashotyan is married and has 2 sons.

== Sources ==
- http://www.parliament.am/deputies.php?sel=details&ID=919&lang=eng
- https://www.gov.am/am/previous-ministers/
- http://www.hhk.am/en/executive-body/bio/59/
- http://www.europarl.europa.eu/meetdocs/2004_2009/documents/dv/dsca20081124_0/dsca20081124_03b.pdf
