= Artsruni (surname) =

Artsruni (Armenian: Արծրունի; also transliterated as Ardzruni), an ancient Armenian noble family.

Artsruni / Ardzruni is a common Armenian surname and may refer to:

- Gagik Artsruni or Gagik I of Vaspurakan (c. 879 – c. 936/943), Artsruni ruler of Vaspurakan in southern Armenia, first as prince of northwestern Vaspurakan (Gagik III, 904–908) and after that until his death as king, claiming also the title of "King of Armenia" from the Bagratid line
- Gagik Apumrvan Artsruni (or Abu Morvan), Armenian prince of the Artsruni line
- Grigor Artsruni (1845–1892), Armenian journalist, critic, writer and public activist
- Mariam Artsruni, or Mariam of Vaspurakan, daughter of John-Senekerim Artsruni, an Armenian king of Vaspurakan, and the first consort of the king George I of Georgia
- Meruzhan Artzruni, Nakharar, Armenian feudal lord who ruled c. 355–369
- Tovma Artsruni, 9th-century to 10th-century Armenian historian
- Vahan Artsruni (born 1965), Armenian rock musician, singer, composer and artist
- Şahan Arzruni (born 1943), Armenian classical pianist, composer
