= Jabir Imanov =

Azerbaijani comedian and entertainer (1976–2025)

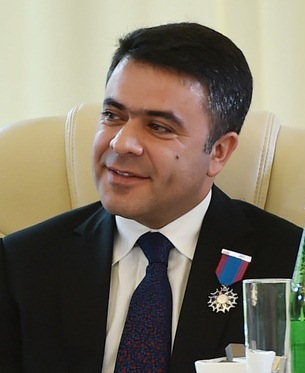
Jabir Imanov in 2019

Jabir Gorkhmaz oglu Imanov (Azerbaijani: Cabir Qorxmaz oğlu İmanov; 22 June 1976 – 29 September 2025) was an Azerbaijani comedian and entertainer. A member of Guys from Baku satirical team, he formed the comic duo Elish and Roshka with his brother Tahir Imanov. In 2015 he received the title of Merited Artist of Azerbaijan and in 2021 was awarded the Taraggi Medal.

== Early years ==
Jabir Imanov was born in Baku to a family of Professor Gorkhmaz Imanov, an economist and corresponding member of Azerbaijan National Academy of Sciences. In 1997, Jabir Imanov graduated from the Faculty of Economics of the Azerbaijan State University of Economics and in 2003, from the Faculty of Law of Baku State University.

== Stage and screen ==
In 1992–2001, Imanov was a member of KVN's Guys from Baku team which received multiple distinctions. In 2001 Imanov joined a follow-up comedy project, The Guys from Baku Planet. In the same year, Imanov made a film debut in Etimad telefonu (Helpline). In the 2003 film Məhəllə (Neighbourhood) he reprised his Guys from Baku role as Elish. Imanov continued his comic acting into the 2020s with the film Ağanatiq 2 (2021).

== Police ==
In 1999–2018, Imanov held various positions in the Azerbaijani Ministry of Internal Affairs, rising to the rank of police lieutenant colonel. In that period, he has also been the head of the Cultural Centre of the State Security Service. As a police officer, he reportedly used excessive force during the 2003 Azerbaijani protests and a footage of his actions was published by Meydan TV. In a 2015 interview Imanov said that police was "a very interesting job", while admitting that "sometimes completely innocent people end up in prison".

== Death ==
Imanov died from a heart attack at a gym in Baku, on 29 September 2025, at the age of 49. Although arriving paramedics attempted to revive him for 20 minutes, he was pronounced dead.
