= Abajyan =

Abajian (Armenian: Աբաջյան) is an Armenian surname western Armenian: (Ապաճեան). Notable people with the surname include:

- Gevorg Abajian (1920–2002), Armenian theatrical and literary critic
- Robert Abajian (1932–1995), American fashion designer
- Robert Abajyan (1996–2016), Armenian junior sergeant
