= Andreasyan =

Andreasyan (Armenian: Անդրեասյան) is an Armenian surname derived from the given name Andreas, equivalent to English Anderson. Notable people with the surname include:

- Arkady Andreasyan (1947–2020), Soviet-Armenian football player
- Karen Andreasyan (born 1977), Armenian lawyer and minister
- Sarik Andreasyan (born 1984), Russian-Armenian film director
- Zhanna Andreasyan (born 1981), Minister of Education, Science, Culture and Sport
