= Karine Sargsyan =

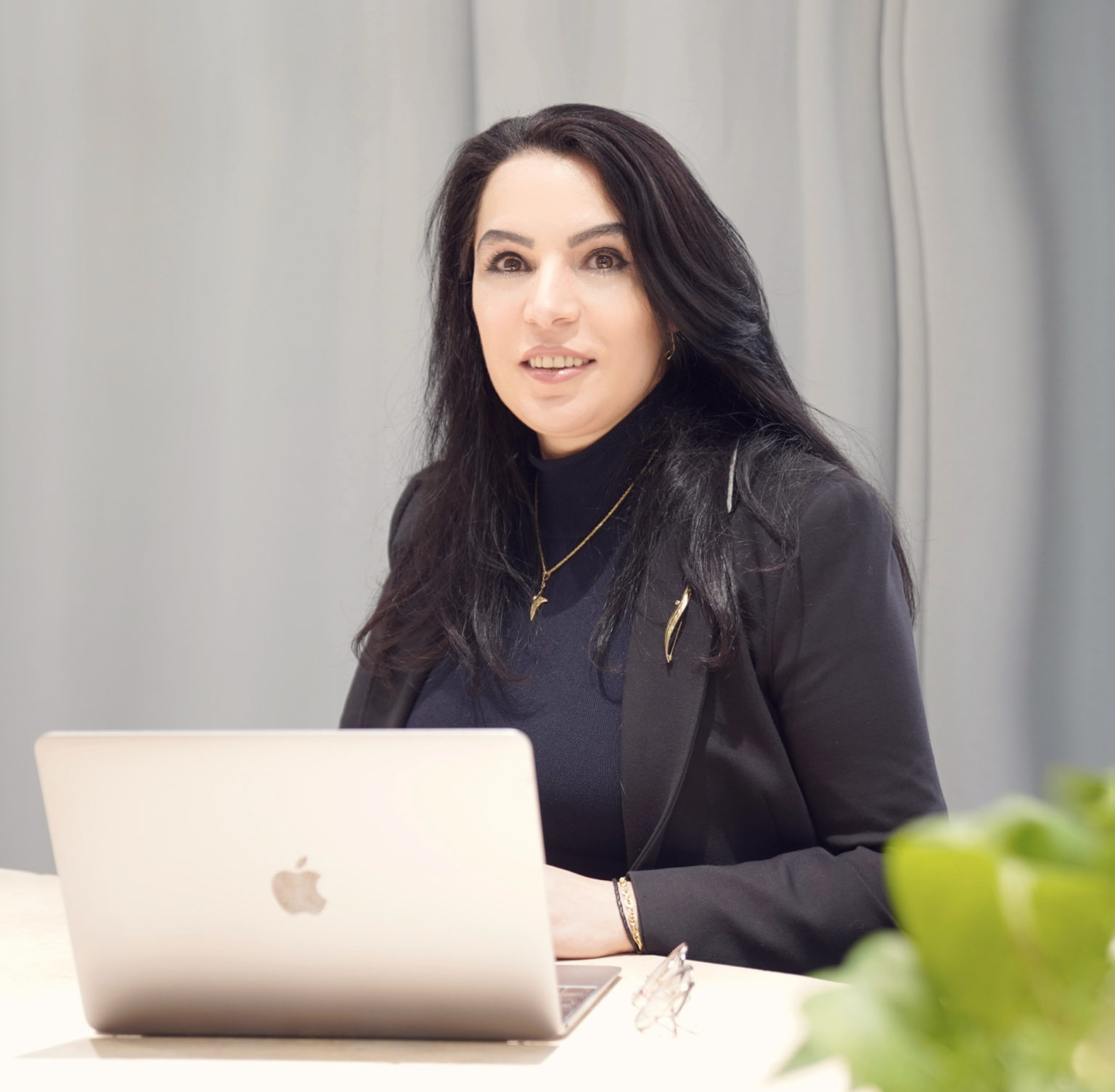
Karine Sargsyan

Karine Sargsyan (Armenian: Կարինե Սարգսյան) is an Armenian-Austrian physician, pediatrician, and geneticist. She currently serves as the Director of Inflammatory Bowel Disease Institute Operations and as Scientific Director of Oncobiobank at Cedars-Sinai Medical Center in Beverly Hills, California, US, and Managing Director for International Biobanking and Education at Medical University of Graz. Her work focuses on biobanking infrastructure, digitalization of medicine, artificial intelligence applications in healthcare, precision and predictive medicine (including molecular twin approaches), and medical foresight. She is also an initiator and Vice Scientific Leader, and Lecturer of the first Bologna conform M.Sc. Biobanking since 2016 and University Course Artificial Intelligence in Medicine at the Medical University of Graz starting in 2022. She was one of the pioneers who spoke about quality measures and regulation requirements in the biobanking field and is also a pioneer in biobanking education. She is lecturing at Cedars Sinai, at Msc Biobanking at MedUniGraz, Austria, at MSc in Biobanks & Complex Data Management at Université Côte d’Azur, Nice, France, and at the Institute of medical Genetics at Yerevan State Medical University, Armenia. Previously, she was the founding managing director of Biobank Graz (MedUni Graz) and directed it from 2007 to 2019. Sargsyan was Scientific Director of Competence Center BioPersMed (2009-2011). She was acting president of ESBB (European, Middle Eastern & African Society for Biopreservation and Biobanking) from September 2022 to May 2023.

She also serves as an advisor (ACC - ILCEC: Oncology Research Vietnam, Qatar Biobank, German Space Agency, MoHs, DDZ, BBMRI-ERIC, DLR, etc.). Most of her work is focused on scientific education (from kindergarten to adult and retraining possibilities) and specifically in innovative technology.

She was granted "Visiting Professor" and “Honorary Doctor” recognition statutes at her alma mater, Yerevan State Medical University, where she graduated as a pediatrician and is still lecturing at the Department of Medical Genetics. She became a voting advisory board member of Center for Molecular Fingerprinting led by Nobel laureate Dr. Ferenc Krausz. She is actively working in future sciences, providing content in lectures and TEDx speeches as well at World Economic Forum, UNGA, UNDP, St Moritz Longevity Forum and Digital Davos Convention.

== Selected publications ==
- Book: Digitalization of Medicine in Low- and Middle-Income Countries: Paradigm Changes in Healthcare and Biomedical Research, Editors: Zisis Kozlakidis, Armen Muradyan, Karine Sargsyan, Springer Cham, Medicine (R0), 2024, ISBN 978-3-031-62331-8
- Book: Future Intelligence: The World in 2050 - Enabling Governments, Innovators, and Businesses to Create a Better Future, Editors: Tamás Landesz, Sangeeth Varghese, Karine Sargsyan, Springer Nature, Business 2023 ISBN 978-3-031-36384-9
- Overview of Cancer Control in Armenia and Policy Implications, Bedirian K, Aghabekyan T, Mesrobian A, Shekherdimian Sh, Zohrabyan D, Safaryan L, Sargsyan L, Avagyan A, Harutyunyan L, Voskanyan A, Tadevosyan A, Melik-Nubaryan D, Khachatryan P, Saghatelyan T, Kostanyan M, Vardevanyan H, Hovhannisyan M, Sarkisian T, Sargsyan K, Babikyan D, Tananyan A, Danielyan S, Muradyan A, Tamamyan G, Bardakhchyan S; 2022, Frontiers in Oncology (11) 782581
- Book: Biobanks in Low- and Middle-Income Countries: Relevance, Setup and Management, 1st ed. 2022, Editors: Sargsyan K, Huppertz B, Gramatiuk S, Springer Nature ISBN 978-3-030-87637-1
- Susceptibility of different mouse wild-type strains to develop diet-induced NAFLD/AFLD-associated liver disease, VHI Fengler, T Macheiner, SM Kessler, B Czepukojc, K Gemperlein, PloS one 11 (5), e0155163, 2016
- Magnetomitotransfer: An efficient way for direct mitochondria transfer into cultured human cells, T Macheiner, VHI Fengler, M Agreiter, T Eisenberg, F Madeo, D Kolb, Scientific Reports 6 (1), 35571, 2016
- Respiratory chain complex I is a mitochondrial tumor suppressor of oncocytic tumors, FA Zimmermann, JA Mayr, R Feichtinger, D Neureiter, R Lechner, Frontiers in Bioscience-Elite 3 (1), 315–325, 2011
- Adiponectin serum concentrations in men with coronary artery disease: the LUdwigshafen RIsk and Cardiovascular Health (LURIC) study, S Pilz, W Maerz, G Weihrauch, K Sargsyan, G Almer, M Nauck, BO Boehm, Clinica chimica acta 364 (1-2), 251–255, 2006
