= Varvara Gabrielyan =

Soviet Armenian pathologist (1901–1972)

- Վարվառա Գաբրիելյան
- Born: Varvara Tumanovna Gabrielyan; 10 January 1901; Tskhna, Nakhichevan uezd, Erivan Governorate, Caucasus Viceroyalty, Russian Empire
- Died: 8 August 1972 (aged 71); Yerevan, Armenian Soviet Socialist Republic, USSR
- Education: Yerevan State Medical University
- Awards: Honored Doctor of the Armenian SSR
- Medical career
- Profession: Physician
- Field: Pathologist

Varvara Tumanovna Gabrielyan (Վարվառա (Վարդուհի) Թումանի Գաբրիելյան; 1901–1972) was a Soviet Armenian physician, pathologist and Honored Doctor of the Armenian SSR.

== Early life and education ==
Varvara Gabrielyan was born on 10 January 1901 in the village of Tskhna (now Chananab), Caucasian Viceroyalty, Russian Empire. In 1929, she graduated from the medical faculty of the Yerevan State Medical Institute. From 1927 to 1929, Gabrielyan worked as a nurse while studying at the institute. Having received a diploma, she worked as a doctor in the villages of Armenia.

== Career ==
From 1930 to 1939, Gabrielyan taught as an assistant professor at the Department of Pathological Anatomy of the Yerevan Medical Institute. From 1939 to 1941, she served as the head of the Department of Pathological Anatomy, and from 1941 to 1944, as an associate professor of the same department.

In 1940, Gabrielyan defended her Ph.D. thesis on Cancer of the Uterus. In 1941, she received the title of associate professor. During the World War II, she provided significant assistance to military hospitals, particularly evacuation hospitals.

From November 1944 to December 1963, Gabrielyan served as the head of the Department of Pathological Anatomy of the Medical Institute. Until December 1963, she worked as the chief pathologist of the Ministry of Health of the Armenian SSR. Gabrielyan was the organizer of the Scientific Society of Pathologists-Anatomists of the Armenian SSR and the president of this society until 1963. She was also a board member of the Society of Pathologists of the USSR. Gabrielyan is the author of numerous scientific papers.

From January 1963 to 1965, Gabrielyan worked as head of the laboratory of pathological morphology at the Institute of Occupational Health and Occupational Diseases. At the Institute of Obstetrics and Gynecology, Gabrielyan created a laboratory for the early diagnosis of tumors, which she headed until 1970.

In 1961, Gabrielyan was awarded the title of Honored Doctor of the Armenian SSR. She was elected to the city council of Yerevan three times. Varvara Gabrielyan died on 8 August 1972 in Yerevan.

== Personal life ==
Gabrielyan's daughter Ida Avetovna Movsesyan (1922-2004) was a candidate of medical sciences, associate professor of Yerevan Medical University.

== Awards and honors ==
- Medal "For Valiant Labor in the Great Patriotic War of 1941-1945"
- Medal "For the Victory over Germany in the Great Patriotic War of 1941-1945"
- Diploma of the Republican Committee of the Union of Medical Workers (1949)
- Order of the Red Banner of Labor (1953)
- Diploma of the Supreme Soviet of the Armenian SSR (1963)
