= KVN =

Soviet and Russian television program

- Genre: Game-show franchise
- Created by: Sergey Muratov, Albert Axelrod, Mikhail Yakovlev
- Countries of origin: Soviet Union, Russian Federation

Production
- Running time: 60–180 minutes (depending on the version)
- Production companies: Home Edition programs for the youth of the Central Television of the USSR (1961-1972, 1986-1990); Igra-Tekhnika (1988-1990); AMiK (Alexander Maslyakov & Company) (1990-present)

Original release
- Network: Programme One (1961-1972, 1986-1991); Ostankino Channel One (1992-1995); Channel One (1995-present)
- Release: 8 November 1961 – present

KVN (Russian: КВН, an abbreviation of Клуб весёлых и находчивых, Klub vesyolykh i nakhodchivykh or Ka-Ve-En, "Club of the Funny and Inventive [people]") is a Russian and formerly Soviet comedy television show and international competition in which teams compete by giving humorous answers and show prepared sketches. The show originated in the Soviet Union and is based on the earlier program An Evening of Funny Questions (Russian: Вечер весёлых вопросов, romanized: Vecher vesyolykh voprosov). The program was first aired on the Soviet First Channel on 8 November 1961.

In 1972, Soviet censors, who found the students' impromptu jokes offensive and anti-Soviet, banned KVN. The show was revived in 1986 during the perestroika era, with Alexander Maslyakov as its host. It is one of the longest-running programs on Russian television; its anniversary on 8 November is celebrated by KVN players every year since its inception and was widely celebrated for the first time in 2001.

During the perestroika era (c. 1985-1991), KVN spread to Russian expatriate communities. In 1992, an Israeli team played against the Commonwealth of Independent States (CIS) team. The game became a success, and more international games followed: the CIS team visited Israel, Germany and the United States. In 1994, the first KVN World Festival was held in Israel; it featured four teams representing the United States, Israel, the CIS and Germany.

== Leagues and competitions ==
Groups of KVN teams were organized into several leagues, in which they annually competed for the League Champion title. To organize the movement, the KVN Union created a structure of regional and multi-regional arrangements of Leagues. The Major League and the Premier League are regularly broadcast on Russian television station Channel One. Other leagues were broadcast on local channels. The winner of the Major League (Vysshaya Liga Russian: Высшая Лига) is declared the Champion of the Club. There are other KVN competitions outside the leagues: the KVN Festival (KiViN) is held in Sochi each January and attracts hundreds of teams from around the world: this is where teams are arranged into leagues for the season; the Musical Festival, which is called "Singing KiViN" (Golosyaschiy KiViN, Russian: Голосящий КиВиН), was held every July in Jūrmala, Latvia; and has been held in Svetlogorsk, Kaliningrad Oblast, Russia, since 2015. At the festival, teams compete to win prestigious prizes; the Summer Cup or Supercup is usually played in August every year, usually in Sochi, and only Major League champions are allowed to compete (with some exceptions: in 2003, when a team of famous KVN players competed, and in 2007, 2008 and 2010, when finalists were invited). A game called the Specproject (pronounced "Spetsproyekt") is held every November to celebrate KVN's anniversary. Many places, both inside and outside the CIS, have leagues independent from the KVN Union and hold their own competitions.

== Format ==
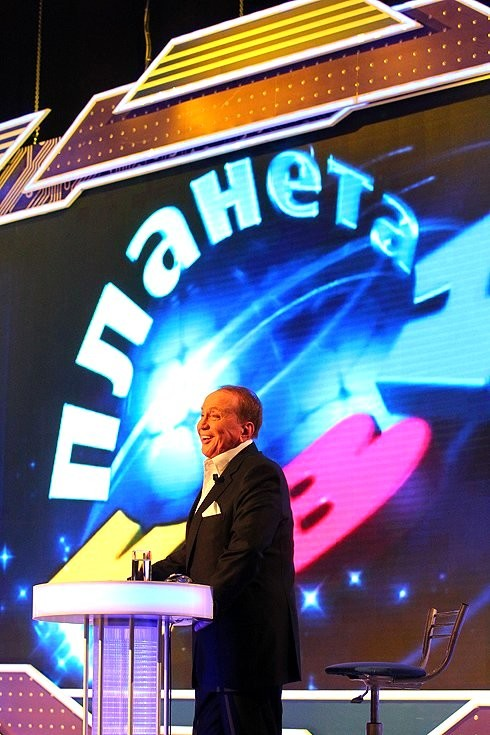
Alexander Maslyakov hosts the Major League on 1 April 2013

KVN is a task-based team competition that is played in front of a live audience and a panel of judges. Typically, each team is asked to complete four or five themed assignments, such as:

- Mandatory
  - Greeting (Privetstviye, Russian: Приветствие): witty introduction of the team, humorous greeting to the jury and spectators.
  - Warm-up (Razminka, Russian: Разминка) is usually the second contest; a rapid exchange of funny questions and improvised answers, sometimes played against the audience, jury and the host.
  - Musical Competition (Muzykalnyy Konkurs, Russian: Музыкальный конкурс): the competing teams perform musical sketches, sing, play musical instruments and dance. Sometimes an alternative, shorter version called One Song-Contest (Konkurs Odnoy Pesni, Russian: Конкурс одной песни) is played; players must use one melody throughout the competition.
- Optional
  - STEM ("students' variety miniature theater") (Russian: СТЭМ): three performers from a team are allowed to be on stage simultaneously.
  - Captains' contest (Kapitanskiy Konkurs, Russian: Капитанский конкурс): individual competition between the team captains.
  - Homework (Domashneye Zadaniye, Russian: Домашнее задание): comedy sketches on a given topic; sometimes Musical Homework is played when there is no Musical Competition.
  - BRIZ (Bureau of Rationalization and Invention) (Russian: БРИЗ): teams present an invention, a brief historical survey, movies, photo-albums or any type of new idea. It is also called a literature contest because it mainly consists of textual jokes.
  - News Contest (Konkurs Novostey, Russian: Конкурс новостей): similar to the BRIZ but focuses on strange and funny news items.
  - Biathlon (Russian: Биатлон): a representative of each team "shoots" one or more jokes at the audience. The jury decides who leaves the "shooting range" until only two contestants remain and the jury chooses one winner who gets one point. In case of a draw the finalists receive 0.9 points each.
  - Freestyle (Russian: Фристайл): a more-modern and freer version of the Greeting, in which the teams have no genre restrictions.
  - Cinema Contest (Kinokonkurs, Russian: Киноконкурс) involves contestants making a movie, a music video, a clip consisting of different video and audio pieces, or dubbing a well-known movie.

A panel of celebrity judges evaluates performances on wit, humor, production values and audience reaction, and declares a winner by awarding points to the teams. In the Premier League, the jury usually consists of famous KVN players.

== Analysis of the content of KVN releases for the presence of political censorship ==
The recognition of KVN as a political tool by the NATO StratCom Center for Strategic Communications became the reason for conducting a content analysis of KVN releases. Based on the results of a content analysis of political humor in four episodes of KVN from 23 October to 27 November 2016, in various formats, one with the participation of the President of the Russian Federation, the following conclusions were drawn:

1. The format and location of the game affect the nature of the content of political jokes.
2. Jokes containing foreign policy themes construct a positive image of the state and Russia's superiority in the international arena, even if the situation differs from reality.
3. In the anniversary release of KVN, which Russian President Vladimir Putin attended, political humor does not contain some of the relevant topics that were the subject of jokes earlier and were discussed on the Internet (2016 State Duma elections, corruption scandals, the dismissal of P. A. Astakhov, and calls for an abortion ban).
4. Jokes contain ethnic and gender stereotypes.
5. Jokes about domestic politics contain political correctness; as a rule, there are no specific characters in them except Vitaly Mutko and Alexei Kudrin.
6. The European Union, the United States of America, Barack Obama, Hillary Clinton, Angela Merkel, Mikheil Saakashvili, the political leadership of Ukraine, the West, Vitaly Mutko, Alexei Kudrin, the builders of the Zenit Arena, and the Police of Russia received a negative assessment in political humor.
7. President of the Russian Federation Putin received a positive assessment and was portrayed in a heroic and mythological image.
8. Donald Trump, Ramzan Kadyrov, Alexander Lukashenko, and Alexander "The Surgeon" Zaldastanov also received a positive assessment.
9. The main stereotypes of political humor are: the USA and the West are unfriendly to Russia, American politicians violate international law, and corruption in Russia is a problem only Putin can solve.
10. The subtext in political humor: without Russia and Putin, it is impossible to solve global problems; sanctions against Russia do not harm Russia; while Europe has a migrant crisis, Russia is doing well; officials and deputies should not fence themselves off from the people; the President should not be ashamed of the development of the regions; and United Russia has an advantage in the upcoming elections.

Based on the content analysis results, it was revealed that the political humor in KVN unquestioningly contains political censorship. In an interview with the Youtube channel Wanna Banana, the former leader of the SOK KVN team and ex-editor of the Higher League of KVN in 2017 spoke about the presence of censorship on stage and in editing. He said that Channel One could single-handedly cut segments out of the program. An example was the case of how in 2011, Channel One cut a parody of a viral YouTube clip of Dmitry Medvedev dancing from a televised airing.

== Popularity ==
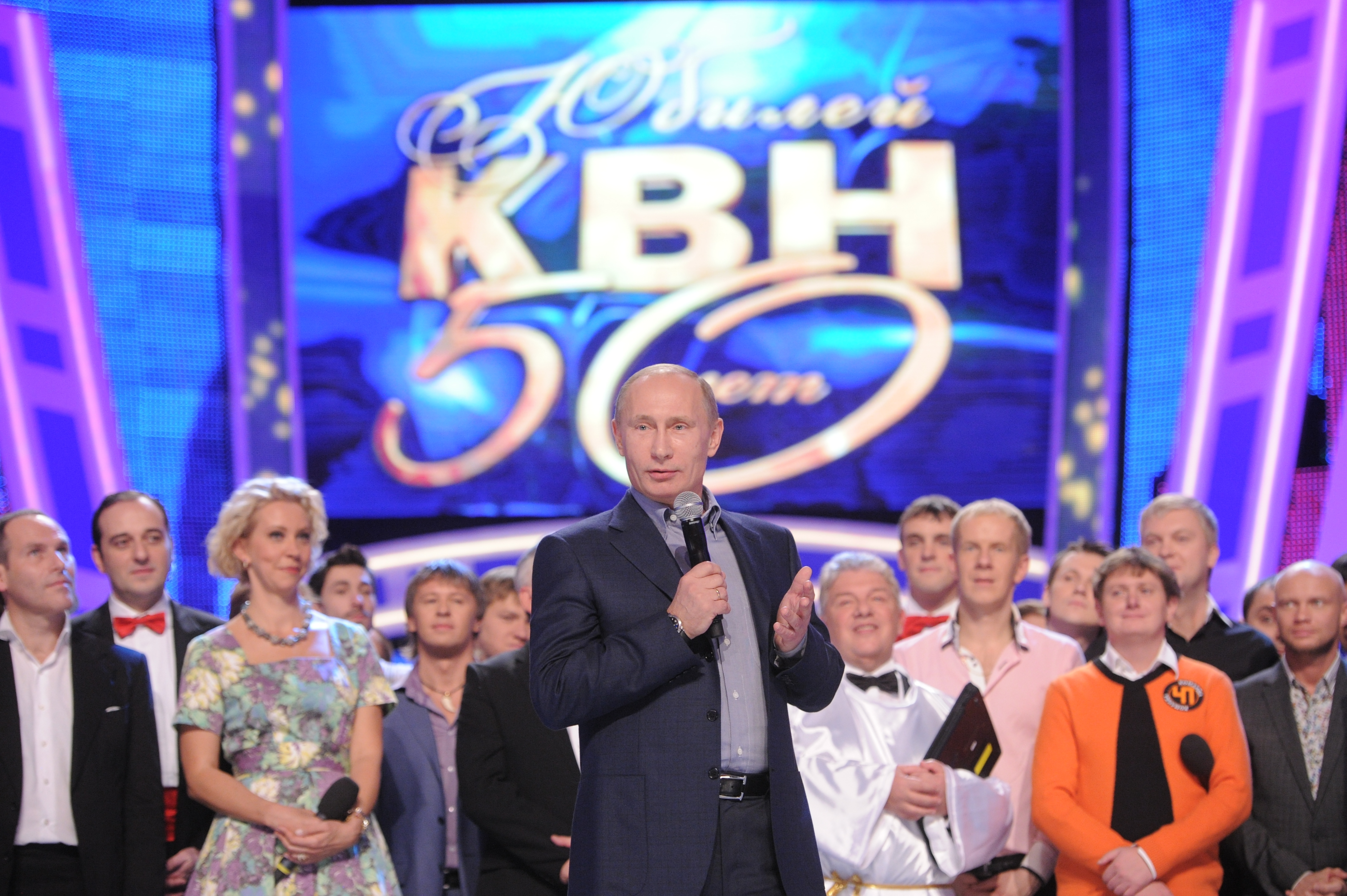
Vladimir Putin attends the taping of the 50th anniversary episode of the KVN comedy show and congratulates KVN members, 13 November 2011

According to the official website of KVN Union, the game has over five million live viewers annually; more than 40,000 participants organized into more than 3,000 regularly competing teams from more than 100 cities.

For more than 20 years, television broadcasts of KVN games received the highest ratings in Russia. The game is so popular politicians use it as an opportunity to gain extra points: Boris Yeltsin, Vladimir Putin and Dmitry Medvedev attended games played before elections. The game of KVN helps in interstate relationships; the CIS–Israel game broadcast on 19 September 1992, helped improve relationships between the two countries—mostly on Russia's side. KVN became part of the culture and became a game of choice in Russian-speaking communities worldwide.

In 2006, the president of the club Alexander Maslyakov received one of the highest awards from Vladimir Putin, the President of Russia, for hosting the game for so many decades, at the end of the game dedicated to KVN's 45th anniversary.

== International reach ==
Since perestroika opened Soviet borders for emigrants, KVN has reached Israel, Germany, Australia, Portugal, France, the United Kingdom, Vietnam and the United States. Many countries created their own teams, leagues and competitions. In 1992, the Israel team played against the CIS team. The game was a success and more international games followed; the CIS team visited Israel, Germany and the United States. In 1994, the first KVN World Festival was held in Israel with four teams from the United States, Israel, the CIS and Germany. This event attracted a new generation of players. Currently, the American league includes more than 30 teams from universities, including Harvard, Berkeley and New York University (NYU), the first League Champion. KVN Israel comprises two leagues with about 30 teams. The UK also has a prominent KVN community, with teams from a number of universities.

In 1996, VTV3 launched their first gameshow called SV, which was inspired by the format of KVN according to the director and host Lai Van Sam. The success of the first season in 1996 leading VTV3 held the next four seasons in 2000, 2012, 2016 and 2020.

== Notable KVN players ==
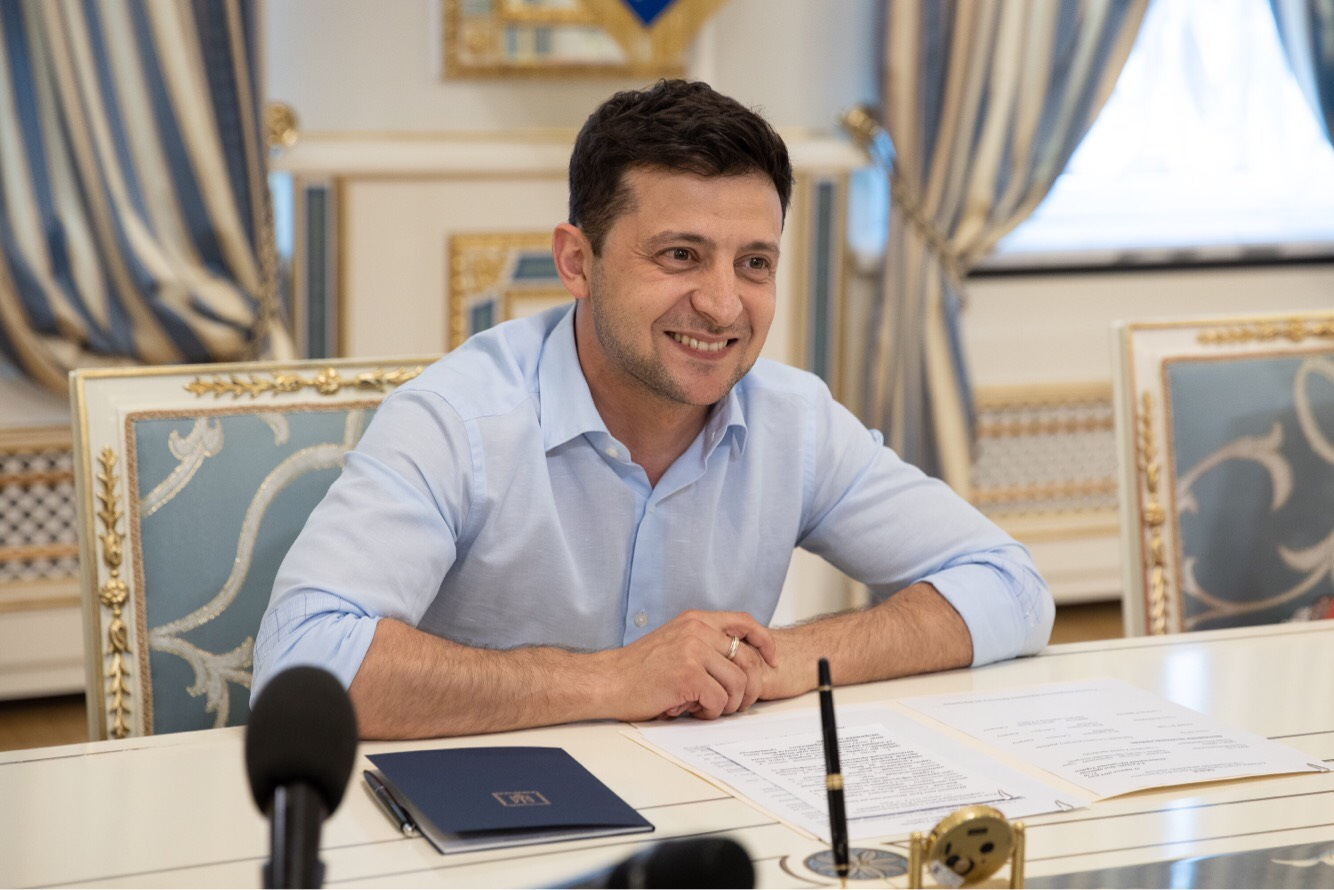
Volodymyr Zelenskyy, President of Ukraine (2019–present), captain of Kvartal 95, Kryvyi Rih (1998–2003, Major League).

- Yuli Gusman, captain of the Guys from Baku team (1967–1971, Major League) and a long-time jury member (since 1986).
- Ismail Abdullaiev, member of the Donetsk Polytechnic Institute team (1987–1996) and director of pro-Russian television networks in Ukraine.
- Gennady Zyuganov, captain of the Physics and Mathematics Faculty team of the Oryol State University (1960s).
- Leonid Yakubovich, Gennady Khazanov and Vladimir Semago, members of the MISI team (1960s, Major League) and jury.
- Mikhail Zadornov, captain of the Riga Technical University team (1970s), guest star (2013, Major League). Jury member.
- Mikhail Yevdokimov, captain of the Novosibirsk Trade University team (1979–1981).
- Valdis Pelšs, Alexei Kortnev and Neschastny Sluchai, members of the MSU team (1987–1988, Major League) and jury.
- Leonid Slutsky, The Third Sons team of FC Olimpia Volgograd (1990s), guest star (2013 and 2014, Major League). Jury.
- Volodymyr Zelenskyy, President of Ukraine (2019–present), captain of Kvartal 95, Kryvyi Rih (1998–2003, Major League).
- Elchin Azizov, Anar Mammadkhanov and Bahram Bagirzade, members of the Parni iz Baku team (1991–2001, Major League).
- Pelageya, member of the NGU team (1997, Major League), the youngest KVN player of her time. Jury member.
- Grigori Gorin and Arkady Arkanov, wrote for the Sechenov University team (1960s). Jury members.
- Vadim Samoylov of the Agatha Christie rock band, member of the UPI team (1987–1988, Major League).
- Aleksandr Filippenko, member of the Moscow Institute of Physics and Technology team (1962/1963 champions).
- Garik Martirosyan and Artur Janibekyan, members of the New Armenians team (1993–2002, Major League).
- Sergei Svetlakov, member of the Ural pelmeni team (2000–2009, Major League).
- Petr Elfimov, member of the BSU and RUDN teams (1999–2003, Major League).
- Sergey Lazarev, captain of the school KVN team (revealed it during one of the games while serving as a jury member).
- Dmitry Koldun, member of the RSMU team Storm Warning (2005, Euroleague, Premier-League). Also a jury member.
- Sitora Farmonova, member of the Asia MIX team (2015–2016, Major League).
- Yolka, member of the united Uzhhorod-Vinnytsia team (2001–2003).
- Ruben Jaghinyan, member of the Yerevan State Medical University team (1991–1994, Major League).
- Mikhail Galustyan, member and captain of the Burnt by the Sun team (1999–2003, Major League). Jury member.
- Semyon Slepakov, captain of the United Pyatigorsk team (2000–2006, Major League). Jury member.
- Yelena Khanga, member of the World United team (1980s).
- Anatoly Wasserman, member of the Odesa team (1970s), jury member.
- Verka Serduchka, captain of the CPTU No.30 team, a famous singer, comedian and dancer that won second place representing Ukraine in the Eurovision Song Contest 2007
