= Guys from Baku =

The Guys from Baku (Russian: Парни из Баку, Azerbaijani: Bakılı oğlanlar or Parni iz Baku) is a former KVN team from Baku, Azerbaijan that was active from the late 1980s to the early 2000s. Within KVN, they were Premier League champions in 1992, finalists in 1993, and winners of the Tournament of the Ten in 2000. They also won the KVN Summer Cup in 1995 that was held in their home city. The Guys from Baku often travestied politicians, police and highlighted social issues in satirical and comic performances. Their performances were particularly popular in late 1990s and early 2000s. The team's prominent regulars included Anar Mammadkhanov, Bahram Bagirzade, Tahir Imanov, Jabir Imanov, Murad Dadashov, Elchin Azizov, Timur Weinstein and Vado Korovin.

Since the 2000s the team has been running a follow-up comic project, The Guys from Baku Planet.

== KVN ==
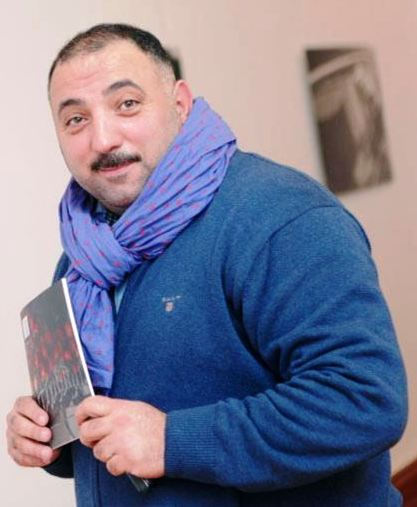
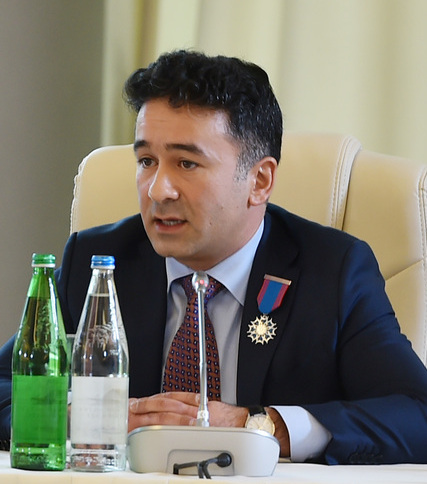
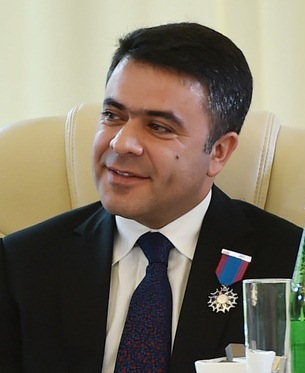
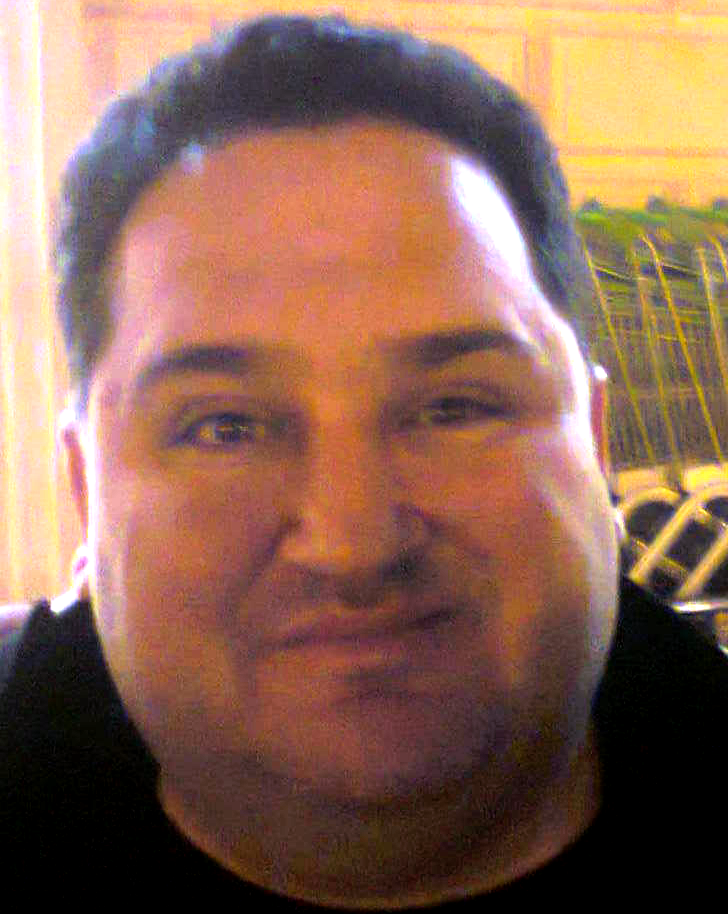
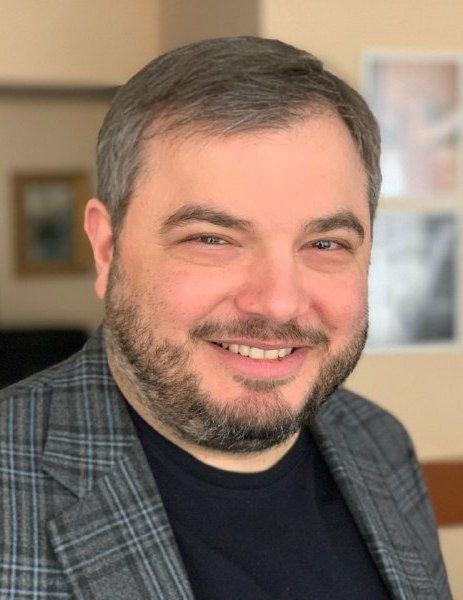
The main KVN roster of Guys from Baku, left to right: Bahram Bagirzade, Tahir Imanov, Jabir Imanov, Murad Dadashov, Timur Weinstein.

The Guys from Baku team was created in 1988 by Anar Mammadkhanov who became its captain. The team succeeded its less known KVN iteration with the same name from 1967–1971.

In 1992, with the support of the then-Minister of Culture of Azerbaijan, Polad Bulbuloglu, the Guys from Baku entered KVN's Premier League and successfully progressed into the semi-final. The next game with the team of Simferopol State University also ended in favor of the Guys from Baku who ultimately won the 1992 KVN season.

In the 1993 season, the Guys from Baku faced the Novosibirsk team Girls from Jazz in the final. The game had an unconventional scoring system, where the final score was calculated based on the scores of two jury panels (the regular jury and members of the Moscow government) and the rounding was done to the nearest tenth. Because of that, the final was won by the Girls from Jazz, but had rounding been done to hundredths, the victory would have been awarded to the Guys from Baku.

In 1995 the Guys from Baku won the KVN Summer Cup in Baku, having defeated the team Odessa Gentlemen for a second time since 1970.

In 2000 the Guys from Baku also faced Odessa Gentlemen in the KVN Premier League semifinal and eventually won the final game.

== The Guys from Baku Planet ==
In 2001 some members of the team launched a follow-up television and stage project, The Guys from Baku Planet that is also billed as theatre.

== Censorship ==
The Azerbaijani government stance on the Guys from Baku satires was initially appreciative, and two Azerbaijani presidents (Heydar Aliyev and Ilham Aliyev) attended their performances. Although the Guys from Baku have been consistently loyal to Azerbaijani government and did not support political opposition, from 2015 they ultimately faced censorship. The Guys from Baku were restricted particularly in satirizing Azerbaijani police, customs and tax administration. Local TV channels Lider TV and ANS TV eventually refused to cooperate with The Guys from Baku Planet.
