= Gevorg Tamamyan =

Armenian pediatric oncologist and hematologist

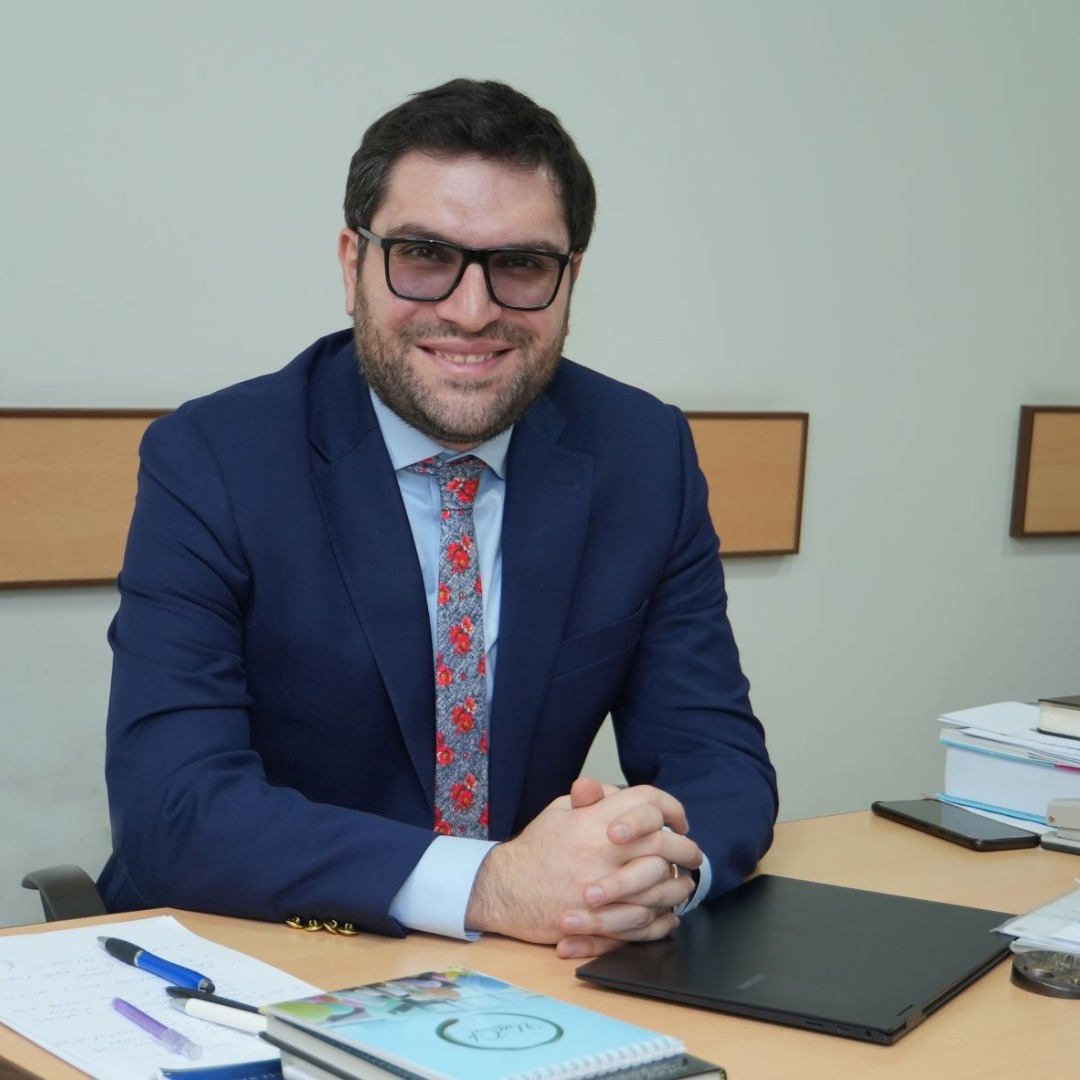
Gevorg Tamamyan

Gevorg Tamamyan is an Armenian pediatric oncologist and hematologist. He is a professor and chair of the Department of Pediatric Oncology and Hematology at Yerevan State Medical University, chief executive officer of the Immune Oncology Research Institute (IMMONC), and co-founder and editor-in-chief of OncoDaily. In September 2026, the World Health Organization (WHO) listed him as a prospective candidate for the post of Director-General, proposed by Botswana.

Tamamyan is president of the Asia Continental Branch of the International Society of Pediatric Oncology (SIOP Asia) and the Pediatric Oncology East and Mediterranean (POEM) Group. His career has included clinical practice, medical education, research, and the development of pediatric cancer services in Armenia.

== Education and training ==
Tamamyan received his medical degree from Yerevan State Medical University in 2010, a master's degree in advanced oncology from the University of Ulm in 2015, and a PhD in oncology from Yerevan State Medical University in 2016. He also holds a Doctor of Medical Sciences (DSc) degree.

His postgraduate training included pediatric hematology and oncology at China Medical University in Taiwan and St. Anna Children's Hospital in Vienna. He undertook a research fellowship at the European Organisation for Research and Treatment of Cancer in Brussels in 2014, a postdoctoral fellowship in the Department of Leukemia at the University of Texas MD Anderson Cancer Center in 2014–2015, and a visiting scientist appointment at Dana-Farber/Boston Children's Cancer and Blood Disorders Center in 2015.

He also completed postgraduate programs in cancer research at Harvard Medical School and global health delivery at the Harvard T.H. Chan School of Public Health.

== Career ==
=== Academic and clinical work ===
Tamamyan became chair of the Department of Pediatric Oncology and Hematology at Yerevan State Medical University in 2019 and a professor in the department in 2021. He has also served as an adviser to the university's rector and was an adviser on oncology to the Armenian Ministry of Health in 2018–2019.

In 2019, he became head of the Pediatric Cancer and Blood Disorders Center of Armenia. The center consolidated pediatric oncology and hematology services previously provided by the Hematology Center, the National Center of Oncology, and Yerevan State Medical University's Muratsan hospital complex.

The university's Department of Pediatric Oncology and Hematology developed residency programs in pediatric oncology and hematology, hematology, and transfusion medicine under his chairmanship.

=== Cancer care and medical organizations ===
Tamamyan co-founded the City of Smile Charitable Foundation, which supports the costs of treatment and related care for children with cancer in Armenia, including medicines, diagnostic testing, and psychosocial support.

He is co-founder and chief executive officer of the Immune Oncology Research Institute. He also co-founded the Institute of Cancer and Crisis and serves as chair of its board.

Tamamyan is co-founder and editor-in-chief of OncoDaily, a media platform covering oncology.

=== International roles ===
Tamamyan was elected president-elect of SIOP Asia in 2024 and subsequently became president. He also serves as president of the POEM Group, an international network of pediatric cancer centers, and co-chair of the St. Jude EURO Regional Advisory Committee.

He previously chaired the American Society of Clinical Oncology (ASCO) IDEA steering group and co-chaired SIOP's Pediatric Oncology in Developing Countries Supportive Care Working Group. He was president of the Harvard Club of Armenia in 2018–2019.

== Awards and recognition ==
Tamamyan's awards and professional distinctions include:

- International Development and Education Award (IDEA), ASCO (2013).
- Long-term International Fellowship (LIFe) Award, ASCO (2014).
- Young Leader recognition from the Union for International Cancer Control and the International Agency for Research on Cancer (2016).
- 40 Under 40 in Cancer Award (2022).
- Fellow of the American Society of Clinical Oncology (FASCO) (2025).
- Award for Global Oncology Leadership, Latin American and Caribbean Society of Medical Oncology (SLACOM) (2026).

In September 2026, OncoDaily announced that Tamamyan had been selected to receive the Global Health Catalyst Distinguished Leader Award.

== Personal life ==
Tamamyan is married and has two daughters.
