= Day.az =

Azerbaijani news portal founded 2003

- Website type: News site
- Available in: Azerbaijani; Russian
- Website: www.day.az
- Registration: Free/Subscription
- Launched: 2003
- Current status: Active

Day.az is an Azerbaijani news portal established in 2003 by MP Anar Mammadkhanov, trading as the Day.Az Media Company. The content is published in Russian (day.az), English (today.az) and in Azerbaijani (milli.az) since February 1, 2010.

== Disruptions ==
The operators of Day.az claimed that they were the victim of cyberattacks during the 2008 South Ossetia war. On 11 August 2009, Day.az and ANS Press were disrupted, with day.az being inaccessible for almost two hours. On 18 February 2009, the portal became inaccessible, and on the following day the domains' day.az and today.az were removed from the .az top-level domain. Reports concerning the cause ranged from speculation about "political mistakes", hackers, to creation of a new website.

The sale process was triggered by the interview of Boris Berezovsky who is in exile in UK which angered Russian president at the time, Vladimir Putin, who demanded the shut-off the website. Later, the website was reopened by Trend News Agency management, loyal to the existing government.
