= Mikael Atabekyan =

Armenian politician

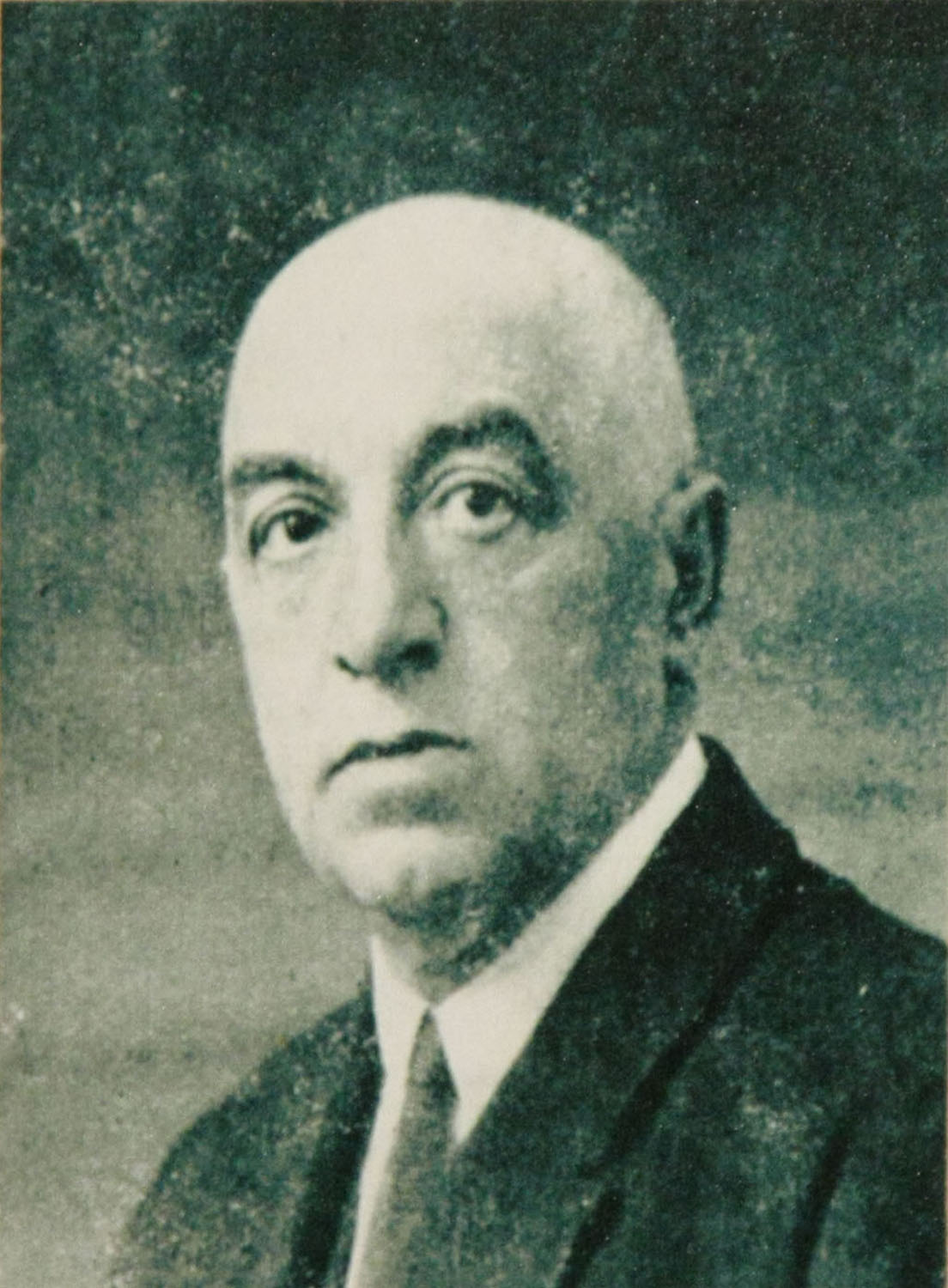

Minister of Enlightenment (Public Education and Art) of the First Republic of Armenia
- In office 4 November 1918 – 4 December 1918
- Prime Minister: Hovhannes Katchaznouni
- Preceded by: Position created
- Succeeded by: Gevorg Melik-Karagyozyan

Personal details
- Party: Armenian Populist Party

Mikael Atabekyan (Armenian: Միքաել Աթաբեկյան) was an Armenian politician who served as Minister of Enlightenment (Public Education and Art) of the First Republic of Armenia in 1918. He was a member of the Armenian Populist Party.

== Bibliography ==
- Hovannisian, Richard G. (1971). The Republic of Armenia: The First Year, 1918–1919. Vol. 1. Berkeley: University of California Press. ISBN 978-0520019843.
