= Elchin Azizov =

Azerbaijani opera singer (born 1975)

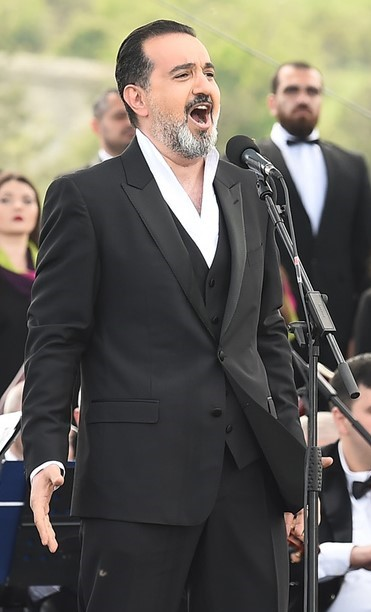
- Azizov at the Khari Bulbul Music Festival in Shusha, 2021

Background information
- Born: Elchin Yashar oglu Azizov; August 13, 1975 (age 51); Baku, Azerbaijan
- Genres: Opera
- Years active: 1992–present

Elchin Azizov (Azerbaijani: Elçin Əzizov, born Elchin Yashar oglu Azizov; August 13, 1975) is an Azerbaijani opera baritone. From 1992 to 2001, he was a member of the Parni iz Baku team of the Russian TV show KVN. Since 2008, he has been a soloist at the Bolshoi Theater in Moscow.

== Biography ==
Azizov was born in 1975, in Baku. He studied at the Azerbaijan State University of Culture and Arts and obtained his diploma as a movie stage director. He continued his studies at the opera studio at the Baku Music Academy (with Azad Aliyev, conductor), and at the Mozarteum University in Salzburg (with Richard Miller and Alessandro Misciasci). Thereafter, he was a member of Galina Vishnevskaya's Opera Centre in Moscow, with Badri Maisuradze. Since 2008, Azizov has been a soloist at the Bolshoi Theater in Moscow.

In 2015, Azizov was expected to make his debut at both Metropolitan Opera in New York City as Ibn-Hakia in Tchaikovsky's Iolanta and Opéra de Montréal as Nabucco in Verdi's Nabucco.

== Performances ==
He performed as Escamillo in Carmen (Galina Vishnevskaya's Opera Centre, Bolshoi Theatre), the title role in Eugene Onegin (Galina Vishnevskaya's Opera Centre, Bolshoi Theatre, and Mikhailovsky Theatre in St. Petersburg), Ibn-Hakia in Iolanta, Tomsky in The Queen of Spades, Leandro in Love for Three Oranges, and Doctor Falke in Die Fledermaus (all at the Bolshoi Theatre).

== Awards ==
Azizov is the winner of the 2nd Prize of The International Opera Singers Contest of Galina Vishnevskaya (2008), and the 4th Prize of The International Opera Singers Contest of Bulbul in Baku (2005).

== Personal life ==
Elchin Azizov is married to artist Hamida Malikova, great-granddaughter of Jalil Mammadguluzadeh and Hamida Javanshir (whom she was named after). They have one son.
