= Anar Mammadkhanov =

Azerbaijani political leader (1970–2011)

Anar Mammadkhanov Member of the National Assembly of Azerbaijan

Member of the Azerbaijan Parliament for Surakhani
- In office 1995–2010
- Preceded by: new constituency

Personal details
- Born: July 20, 1970 Baku, Azerbaijan SSR, Soviet Union
- Died: April 23, 2011 (aged 40) Baku, Azerbaijan
- Party: Independent
- Education: Baku State University

Anar Jamal oghlu Mammadkhanov (Azerbaijani: Anar Camal oğlu Məmmədxanov, 20 July 1970, Baku, Azerbaijan SSR, Soviet Union – 23 April 2011, Baku, Azerbaijan) was a Member of the National Assembly of Azerbaijan, social activist and the captain of Guys from Baku KVN team.

== Life ==
After graduating from Baku State University in 1991, he became the captain of Parni iz Baku KVN team. He served as an MP from Surakhani constituency from 1995 to 2005. He was widely praised for creating Day.az, which was Azerbaijan's first news portal.

On 23 April 2011, he died from sudden heart attack.

== Criticism ==
He has been described in the media as populist and labeled far-right, though this is disputed by other observers. Mammadkhanov, who has refused to align himself with Azerbaijani far-right politicians such as Ganira Pashayeva and Ali S. Hasanov, views himself as a right-wing liberal. Mammadkhanov was also criticized as being a mere demagogue who attacks politicians on superficial issues and their private lives while being unable to provide a valid alternative.

== Personal life ==
Mammadkhanov was greatly influenced by Winston Churchill's policies. He was an avid smoker and drinker for most of his life, something which eventually led to his death.
