= Ruben Jaghinyan =

Soviet and Armenian actor, producer, and TV presenter

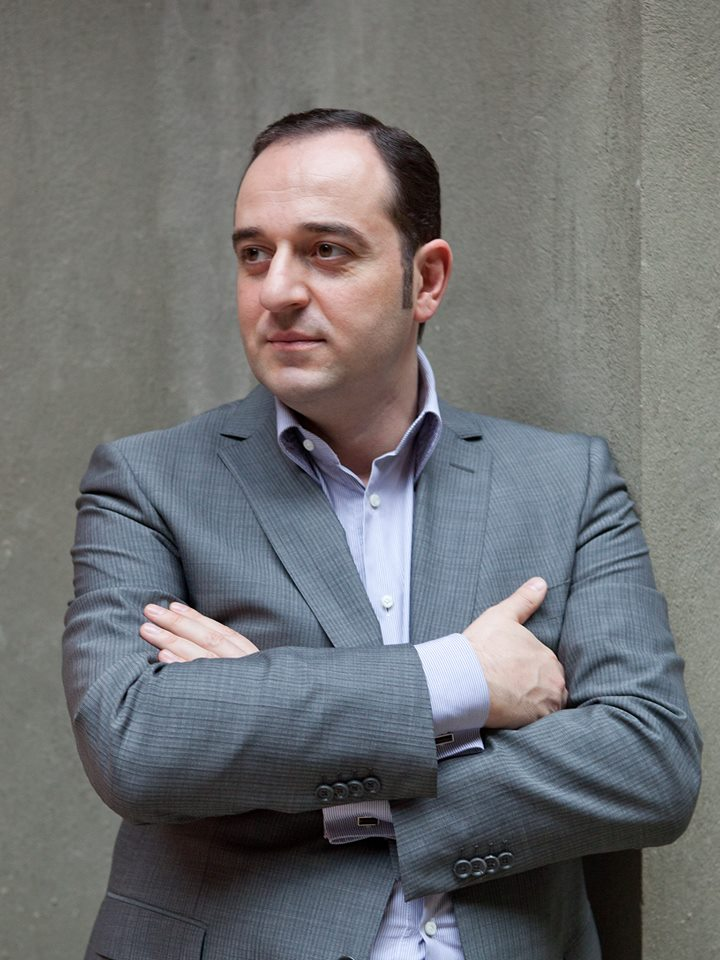
- Born: Yerevan, Soviet Union

Ruben Vladimiri Jaghinyan (Armenian: Ռուբեն Վլադիմիրի Ջաղինյան (born 28 April 1969, Yerevan, Armenian SSR, USSR) is a Soviet and Armenian actor of KVN (Club of the Funny and Inventive), producer, and TV presenter. From 2013 to 2019 Jaghinyan has been the Chairman of the Council of Public TV and Radio Company of Armenia. In 2019 he was appointed the President of the National Film Academy of Armenia.

== Education ==
In 1994 Ruben Jaghinyan graduated from the National Polytechnic University of Armenia with a specialty in Electrotechnical Engineering.

== Early years ==
From 1991 to 1994 Ruben Jaghinyan participated in the Major League of KVN within the Yerevan State Medical University (YSMU). He became a champion of the Major League once in 1992, and a second time in 1994. In 1991 Ruben Jaghinyan established “Sharm” Holding together with his teammates, occupying the position of the General Director (1991-2013). Since 2013 Jaghinyan has been the Chairman of the Council of Public TV and Radio Company of Armenia.

== Family ==
Jaghinyan is married, and has two daughters with his wife Tamara Jaginyan. His wife was born in 1979 in Yerevan and graduated from Lomonosov Moscow State University with a specialization in Asian Studies. Later she received a second education in Moscow State Institute of International Relations with the qualification of an international jurist.

== Artistic achievements ==
Ruben Jaghinyan has appeared as a producer in a number of entertaining TV programs (Armenian Way, Armenian Radio), TV projects (100 option, Red or Black, Armenian Cuisine, Garage), feature films (Our Yard 1, Our Yard 2, Our Yard 3, Taxi Eli Lav a, A Millionaire Wanted), documentaries (The Wizard's Autumn, Uncle Valya, The Story of one Photo, Our Mayor, Petrified Melody, Order, While I am), musical projects (Yerevan-Moscow Transit, Yerevan-Kiev Transit, Two Stars, Erebuni-Yerevan), TV projects for children (We know that you do know) and fashion-shows (ISIS, Style Fashion House, Fashion Jazz Quartet). From 2005 to 2009 project manager of Yerevan magazine. Member of International Academy of Radio and Television. From 2006 to 2011 supervisor of Arts Management course in the Yerevan State Institute of Theatre and Cinema. Since 2019 member of EFA the European Film Academy.

=== Producing work ===
Ruben Jaghinyan is the General producer of the following projects:

- Our Yard, feature film (1996)
- Our Yard 2, feature film (1998)
- As Long as I Live, documentary (2000)
- Armenian Radio, (2002)
- Yerevan-Moscow Transit musical project (2004-2007)
- Our Yard 3, feature film (2005)
- 100 Options, TV project (2006-2007)
- The Songs of Special Purpose event, on the National Army anniversary celebrations (2007)
- Erebuni-Yerevan, the City Day celebrations (2007)
- Two Stars, musical project (2007-2008)
- Our Mayor, documentary (2008)
- Armenian Jazz 70, the Year of Jazz celebration events (2008)
- Fashion Jazz Quartet, fashion show (2008)
- The Songs of Special Purpose, event on the National Army anniversary celebrations (2009)
- Taxi Eli Lav a, feature film (2009)
- Autumn of the Magician, documentary (2009)
- Uncle Valya, documentary (2009)
- The Story of a Photo, documentary (2009)
- Stoned Melody, documentary (2009)
- Exhortation, documentary (2009)
- Erebuni-Yerevan, the City Day celebrations (2009)
- Yerevan-Kiev Transit, musical project (2009)
- Red or Black, TV project (2009)
- Erebuni-Yerevan, the City Day celebration events (2009)
- Spartacus, ballet (2009)
- Erebuni-Yerevan, the City Day celebration events (2010)
- Armenian Cuisine, TV project (2010)
- Aida opera (2010)
- A Millionaire Wanted, feature film (2010)
- The Fiancé from Circus, adventure comedy (2011)
- Poker AM, comedy movie (2012)
- Musical "Love Bridge" (2013)
- Anahit, animation film (2014)
- The Line, feature film (2016)
- The Line 2, feature film (2017)
- The Path of Our Dream, film (2017)

== Awards ==
- 2007 Garegin Njdeh medal awarded by RA Ministry of Defense for contributions to the formation and strengthening of the National Army.
- 2008 Movses Khorenatsi medal for creative achievements in Armenian culture.
- 2008 Gold medal awarded by the RA Ministry of Culture for organizing the celebration of the 70th anniversary of Armenian Jazz (Armenian Jazz 70).
- 2009 The Presidential award for contributions in art.
- 2015 Second-class medal of the Order of Merit for the Motherland.
- 2016 Medal for the Order of Merit for the Motherland for significant achievements in state and socio-political work.
