= Kosh fortress and churches =

Armenian village

Coordinates: 40°18′26″N 44°9′34″E

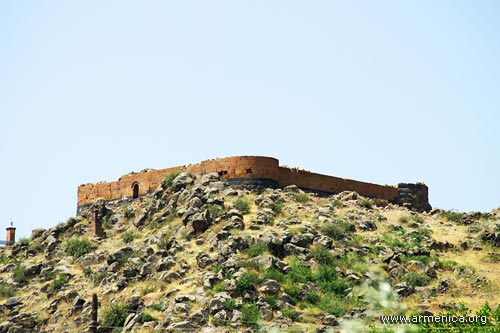
Kosh castle from the nearby fruit garden

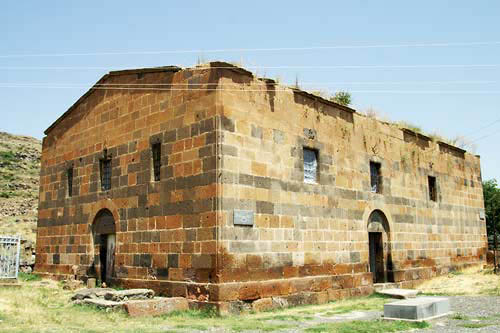
St Gevork church, 19th century

The village of Kosh is in the Ashtarak district, about 18 kilometres (11 mi) south-west of the district centre. There are numerous remains from early Iron Age residential ruins and buildings of large basalt stone blocks. There is information referring to Kosh in Armenian scripts from the 5th century.

== Churches ==
The churches of St Grigor (13th–14th centuries) and St. Gevork (19th century) are protected within Kosh, along with an oil refinery (18th century).

== Fortress ==
The fortress of Kosh (13th century) is in the northern part, on top of a hill, and has right-angled corners and circular towers, built with clear cut large tuff stone blocks, with the lower part consisting of rough-cut basalt blocks. The entrances are situated in the north and south with ceiling-covered corridors.

South of Kosh, stands a large khatchkar-monument of red tuff from 1195. It is 6.8 metres (22 ft) tall). According to inscriptions, it is dedicated to the liberation of Aragatzotn from Seljuk Turks.
