= Bahram Bagirzade =

Entertainer, TV host, actor, comedian and film director

Bahram Bagirzade (Bəhram Bağırzadə)
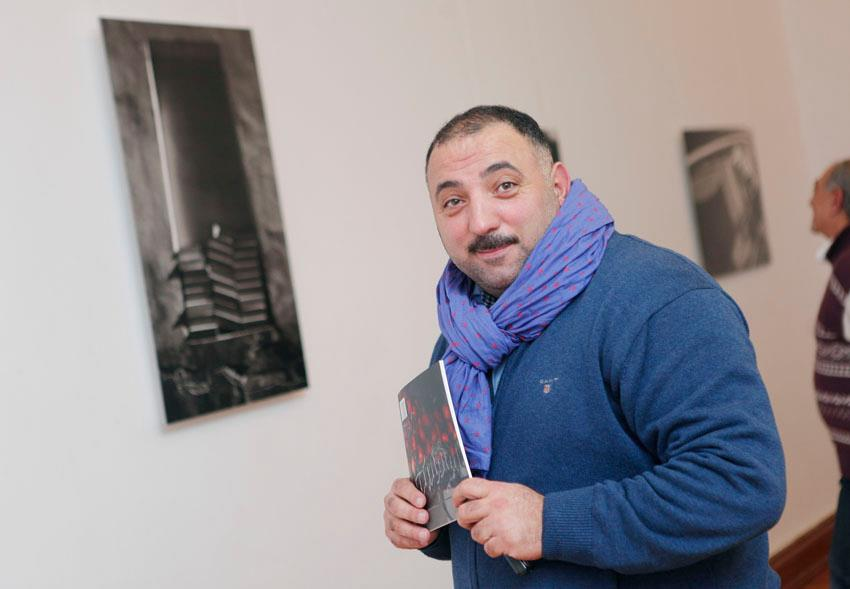
- Born: September 4, 1972 (age 54); Baku, Azerbaijani SSR, USSR

Comedy career
- Medium: TV
- Website: www.bahrambooks.az

Bahram Arif oglu Bagirzade (Azerbaijani: Bəhram Arif oglu Bağırzadə) (born September 4, 1972 in Baku, Azerbaijan) is a TV host, actor, comedian and film director.

== Biography ==
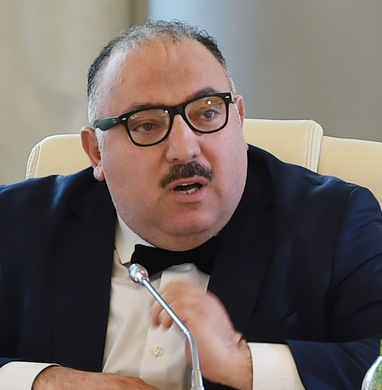
Bəhram Bağırzadə 01.03.2019

In 1994, he graduated from Azerbaijan State University with a degree in filmmaking. He worked three years in a psychological hospital. From 1992 to 2001 he was a member of the Parni iz Baku team of the Russian TV show KVN.

He was diagnosed with COVID-19 on June 7, 2020. His situation became critical on June 14, 2020. He has since made a full recovery.

== Personal life ==
He is married, has two children and currently resides in Baku, Azerbaijan. Bagirzade is an avid fan of Neftchi Baku and is a cartoonist.

== Films ==
=== Actor ===
- 1995: Morning (Səhər)
- 1997: All goes to good (Hər şey yaxşılığa doğru)
- 1999: Between land and sky (Yerlə göy arasında)
- 2001: Dream (Yuxu)
- 2004: National Bomb (Milli bomba)
- 2006: Examination (Yoxlama)
- 2007: Once in Caucasus (Bir dəfə Qafqazda)
- 2008: Halal Money (Halal pullar)
- 2010: Person (Adam)
- 2011: Where's the lawyer? (Vəkil hanı?)
- 2012-2014: 3 Sisters (3 bacı)
- 2013: Fear not, I'm with you! 1919 (Qorxma, mən səninləyəm! 1919)
- 2014: Last stop (Axırıncı dayanacaq)
- 2015: 100 Papers (100 kağız)
- 2015: The yard (Həyət)
- 2017: Aghanatig (Ağanatiq)
- 2018: The Engagement Ring 2 (Bəxt üzüyü 2)
