= St. Gevorg Church (Julfa) =

Armenian church in Nakhchivan, Azerbaijan

- Սուրբ Գեվորգ Եկեղեցի
- St. Gevorg Church
- Location: Gülüstan, Nakhchivan
- Country: Azerbaijan
- Denomination: Armenian Apostolic Church

History
- Founded: 1851

Architecture
- Demolished: 2003–2009

St. Gevorg Church was an Armenian church located in the village of Gulustan (Julfa District) of the Nakhchivan Autonomous Republic of Azerbaijan. The church was located to the south of the Armenian cemetery in the northwestern part of the village.

== History ==
The church was built in 1851, according to an Armenian inscription in the church. The church was on the 1988 list of historical and Cultural monuments of the Azerbaijan SSR under inventory No2613.

== Architecture ==
St. Gevorg was a single nave structure with a wooden roof, semicircular apse, and entrance on the south facade. There were Armenian inscriptions on the bema and the western facade.

== Destruction ==
The foundations of the church were still extant by September 23, 2003. However, by May 28, 2009, the church had been erased, as documented by Caucasus Heritage Watch.
