= St. Gevorg Church (Nor Poradasht) =

Armenian church in Nakhchivan, Azerbaijan

- Սուրբ Գևորգ եկեղեցի
- St. Gevorg Church
- Location: Poradasht
- Country: Azerbaijan
- Denomination: Armenian Apostolic Church

History
- Status: Destroyed
- Founded: 1681

Architecture
- Demolished: October 7, 2001 – November 11, 2009

St. Gevorg Church was an Armenian church located in the abandoned Nor Poradasht village (Julfa District) of the Nakhchivan Autonomous Republic of Azerbaijan.

== History ==
The church was constructed in 1681, according to an Armenian language building inscription on one of the crosses on the moulding inside the arches. The village of Nor Poradasht had been emptied of its Armenian inhabitants by the 1950s. Before the 1950s, the church building was converted into a school. It was in a ruinous condition in 1964–1987. The wooden roof, southern wall, and second-story vestry were gone, but the plan could still be reconstructed.

== Destruction ==
The foundations of the church were still extant on October 7, 2001. However, by November 11, 2009, the ruins had been demolished and the site bulldozed, according to investigation of the Caucasus Heritage Watch. Amidst the ruins of an abandoned village, only the remains of the Armenian church were targeted for elimination. This, according to Caucasus Heritage Watch, testifies to the precision of Azerbaijan's program of cultural erasure.
