= Gevorg Harutjunyan =

Armenian chess grandmaster (born 1981)

Personal information
- Born: May 7, 1981 (age 45) Yerevan, Armenia

Chess career
- Country: Armenia
- Title: Grandmaster (2009)
- Peak rating: 2522 (January 2009)

Gevorg Harutjunyan (Armenian: Գևորգ Հարությունյան; born May 7, 1981) is an Armenian chess grandmaster. In 2008, he achieved 6.0/9 in the 10th Rector Cup, in joint first alongside Alexander Onischuk and Michail Brodsky, but tiebreak decider games brought him down to 3rd place. He also participated in the Dubai Open 2010, where he defeated Gadir Guseinov in 29 moves. He became a grandmaster in 2009 after crossing 2500 fide, but since has mainly remained below 2500. In 2019, he won the December Evenings B-Group in Chelyabinsk.

Guseinov vs. Harutjunyan, Dubai 2010

Position: d1 white rook, c1 white bishop, a1 white king, f2 white pawn, e2 black queen, c2 white pawn, b2 white pawn, a2 white pawn, e4 black rook, h5 white pawn, g5 white rook, f5 white queen, d5 black pawn, c5 black pawn, h6 white knight, g6 white knight, f6 black knight, h7 black king, g7 black pawn, d7 black knight, b7 black pawn, a7 black pawn, f8 black bishop, a8 black rook

Final position
