= Vahan Artsruni =

Armenian rock musician

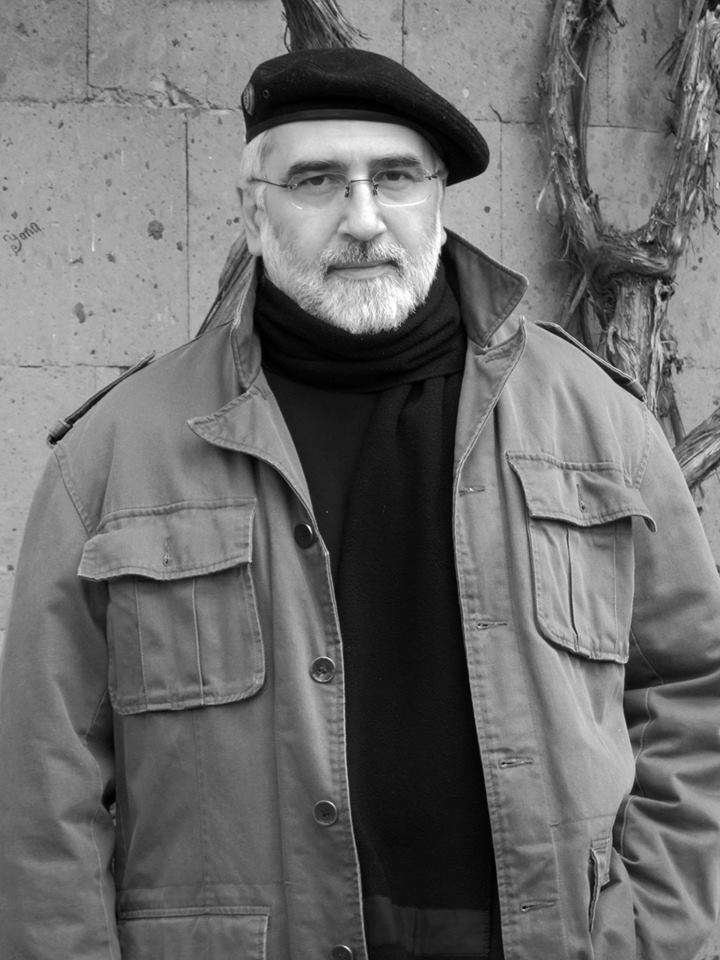
Vahan Artsruni

Vahan Artsruni (born December 5, 1965, Yerevan) is a modern Armenian rock musician, singer, composer and artist.

== Biography ==
Artsruni started his musical career in 1984 in the underground minstrel and rock musician Arthur Meschian's band. He graduated at the Yerevan State Medical University and the Yerevan State Musical Conservatory (in 1995) majoring in vocal with the outstanding Armenian singer Gohar Gasparyan. Subsequently, he was soloing with "Narek" Male Choir from 1989 to 1994 and in 1993–1994 at the State Academic Cappella of Armenia and "Haysmavourk" Medieval Choir. He gave concerts with the Armenian National Symphonyc Orchestra, represented "Ethnophonica" and "Komitas. Ten Revelations" cycles. In 2000 Vahan Artsruni organized a progressive music band called ARTSRUNI.

== Awards ==
- Best Alternative Folk Album, Armenian Music Awards, 2004
- Best Album Cover and Design, Armenian Music Awards, 2004

== Discography ==
=== As Vahan Artsruni ===
- "Prologue." 1991
- Rouben Hakhverdyan, Lilit Pipoyan and Vahan Artsruni, 1991
- "The Spirit of War." Videofilm,1996
- "Idea Fix." Videofilm,1997
- "This is our Motherland" 1998 (CD and cassette)
- “Armenia” - 2001 (P-CD), Australia
- “Ethnophonica” - 2002 (CD), Armenia
- “Komitas. Ten revelations” - 2002 (CD), Armenia, USA

=== As ARTSRUNI band ===
- “Live Cuts” - 2002 (CD), France
- “Cruzaid”- 2002 (CD), France
- “That’s all LIVE” - 2002 (CD), Armenia
