= Gevorg Khachatrian =

Armenian engineer

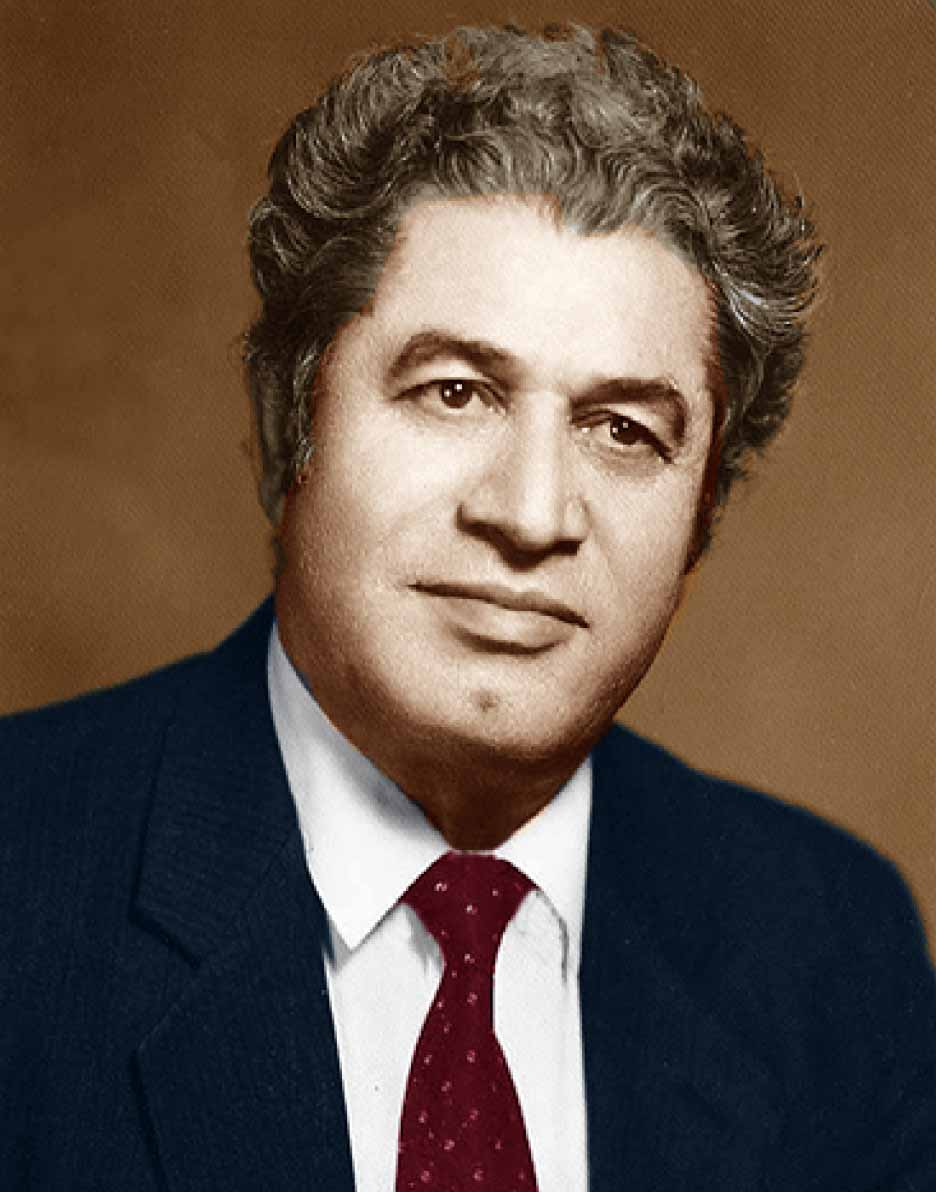
- Born: 1936; Yerevan
- Died: 1996 (age 60)
- Scientific career
- Institutions: Department of Mining Engineering and Metallurgy of Yerevan State Polytechnic Institute

Gevorg Avetisi Khachatrian (PhD) (Armenian: Գևորգ Ավետիսի Խաչատրյան; 1936–1996) was an Armenian scientist, teacher, and engineer. He was a scientist in the field of Mining Industry. He earned a Doctor of Technical Sciences (PhD in Mining Engineering) in 1986. He became a professor in 1988, and a Corresponding Member of the Academy of Sciences of Ukraine in 1991.

He is an Honorary Member of the Freiberg University of Mining and Technology and an Emeritus Professor of Mining Profile Universities in several countries. Օne of the only two doctors in the field of Mining in the history of Soviet and post-Soviet Armenia, along with Yu. Agabalyan.

== Biography ==
Khachatrian was born in 1936 in Yerevan․

In 1958 he graduated from the Yerevan Polytechnic Institute. Since 1967 worked at the same institute. From 1976 to 1995 was the Dean of the Mining and Metallurgical Faculty of Yerevan Polytechnic Institute.He is the author of more than 500 scientific articles, monographs, manuals, textbooks, and dozens of discoveries.

The works are related to the study of the Physics-mechanical and Technological Properties of Rocks, and the Scientific Substantiation of Work Standards in the Mining Industry and Geological Prospecting Service. Author of the "Russian-Armenian Explanatory Dictionary of Mining Terms/1985/.

Khachatrian died in 1996 at age 60.
