= Kevork Shadoyan =

Armenian fashion designer (born 1974)

Personal details
- Born: February 14, 1974 (age 52) Aleppo, Syria
- Education: National Academy of Arts Yerevan

Kevork Shadoyan (Armenian: Գևորգ Շադոյան; Arabic: كيفورك شادويان; born 14 February 1974, Aleppo, Syria) is a Syrian-Armenian fashion designer, tailor, and interior designer.

== Early life ==
Shadoyan was born in 1974 in Aleppo, Syria, to an Armenian family. His father was a tailor, and he worked with clothing during his teenage years.

After finishing school, Shadoyan relocated to Beirut to study fashion. He then received offers to design dowry dresses in Saudi Arabia. Upon returning to Aleppo, he opened his own storefront.

== Education ==
Shadoyan was educated in the Armenian schools of Aleppo, such as Karen Jeppe Gemaran School. In 1997, he graduated from the "College Artistique de la Mode Moderne" institute in Lebanon, as a designer and tailor.

In 2004, he graduated from the State Academy of Fine Arts of Armenia with an honors degree, and was qualified in Decorative Design of Textile Manufacture, where he specialized in the history of Armenian costumes and ornaments.

== Career ==
He has begun his fashion shows in Lebanon, Syria, and then Armenia "Fashion week".

- In 2004, he exhibited his first collection, "The Modern Armenian Wedding" in Boston, Los Angeles, and Houston.
- In 2005, he exhibited his second collection, "The Golden Autumn" in the LA and Houston.
- In 2006, he exhibited his collection "The Armenian Traditional Garments Today" in Sydney, Australia.
- Besides his many individual fashion shows in Armenia in 2006, he participated in the Prêt à Porter Yerevan, and then in a contest in Hong Kong.
- In 2006, he was offered a high-rank title in Moscow for participating in the "Fashion Assembly".
- In 2007, he prepared the final dance costumes for the "Navasart Ensemble" in Paris, and he exhibited his works during the festival there.
- In 2007, he exhibited his paintings and his most recent collection, "The Armenian Silk Road" in Sydney.
- In 2008, he showed the newest collection; Autumn/Winter 2008–2009 in Lviv Fashion Week, Ukraine.
- In 2014, his spring/summer 2015 runway show was revealed on one of the many catwalks of Belarus Fashion Week (BFW).
- Oriflame Fashion Night 2015 was organized in Yerevan, at Swan Lake, showing new collections by well-known designers in Armenia. Oriflame influenced stylists for the creation of the hair-dos and make-up of models.
- In 2015, Estet Fashion Week "Renaissance" collection of national costumes, which received the Best Foreign Collection Award at Estet Fashion Week in Moscow.

== Reincarnation ==
The latest collection of the Shadoyan Couture House is called "Reincarnation" and is dedicated to the Armenian Genocide Centennial. The collection only includes Armenian national costumes.

Shadoyan presented his Renaissance collection of late 18th century and early 19th century Armenian national costumes, inclined towards the Centennial of the Armenian Genocide at Ararat Armenian Sport and Cultural Union of New Julfa.

== Awards ==
Shadoyan won the Best Foreign Collection Award during Estet Fashion Week in Moscow, Russia.
