= Surp Gevork Church, Kosh =

19th-century church in Armenia

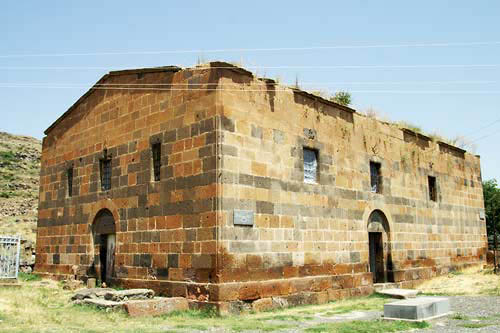
St Gevork church, 19th century.

St. Grigor (13th-14th centuries) and St. Gevork (19th century) are protected within Kosh, Armenia, and an oil refinery (18th century). The fortress of Kosh (13th century) is located in the northern part, top of a hill with right-angled corners and circular towers, built with clear cut large tuff stone blocks, with the lower part consisting of rough-cut basalt blocks. The entrances are situated in the north and south with ceiling-covered corridors. South of Kosh, stands a large khatchkar-monument of red tuff from 1195 (6.8m tall). According to inscriptions, it is dedicated to the liberation of Aragatzotn from Seljuk Turks.

== See also ==
- Kosh fortress and churches
