= St. Gevorg Church (Nakhchivan) =

- Սուրբ Գեվորգ Եկեղեցի
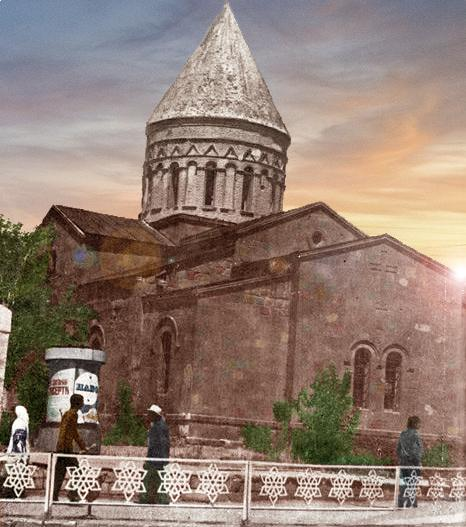
- St. Gevorg Church
- Location: Nakhchivan (city)
- Denomination: Armenian Apostolic Church

History
- Status: destroyed
- Founded: 1869

Architecture
- Style: Basilica
- Years built: 1869-1872
- Demolished: 1997-2005

Saint Gevorg Church, a ruined Armenian apostolic church in Nakhchivan, the capital of the Nakhchivan Autonomous Republic of Azerbaijan.

== History ==
The church was built in 1869 on the foundations of a previously existing church that existed on the site. The construction was completed in 1872.

In Soviet times, it was still a standing monument. The church was completely destroyed at some point between 1997 and 2005.

== Architectural characteristics ==
The church had a quadripartite domed basilica design. It was made up of a rectangular plan of the main shrine, a pair of storage rooms and a hall. The dome, lined with bricks, was located in the center of the cross-like roof of the building, on four gables.

It had three entrances, which were located on the western, northern and southern facades.

The outer walls were lined with red tuff brought from the quarry of Karmir Vank valley in Astapat village.

The church looked quite interesting from the outside, but modestly decorated. The ornamental sculptures were only on the arches of the entrances and windows.

On the two windows on the west side, in a frame, the compositional iconography of St. Sargis was carved. St. Sargis was depicted riding a horse and killing a snake-dragon with a cross-shaped spear under the horse's feet. A praying man was also depicted in front of the horse. A halo was depicted on the head of St. Sargis.
