= Zhanna Andreasyan =

Armenian politician and sociologist (born 1981)

- Ժաննա Անդրեասյան
- Andreasyan in 2026

Minister of Education, Science, Culture and Sports
- Incumbent
- Assumed office 13 December 2022
- Prime Minister: Nikol Pashinyan
- Preceded by: Vahram Dumanyan

Personal details
- Born: Zhanna Arami Andreasyan; 14 February 1981 (age 45) Georgian Soviet Socialist Republic
- Spouse: Petros Ghazaryan
- Education: Yerevan State University

Zhanna Arami Andreasyan (Armenian: Ժաննա Արամի Անդրեասյան; born 14 February 1981) is an Armenian sociologist and politician. She has been serving as Minister of Education, Science, Culture and Sports of Armenia since 2022.

== Career ==
Andreasyan was born on 14 February 1981 in Georgian Soviet Socialist Republic. She obtained a degree in sociology from Yerevan State University in 2002 and a master's degree in 2004, completing postgraduate studies in sociology at the same university between 2004 and 2008.

Between 1997 and 2002, Andreasyan was a correspondent for the children's and youth weekly magazine Kanch. In 2003, she began working at the Centre for Educational Programmes, where she was responsible for ICT implementation, project manager and deputy director until 2019. Since 2004, she has been teaching at the Yerevan State University. She has also been deputy director of the Armenian National Agrarian University.

She was appointed Deputy Minister of Labour and Social Affairs during Minister Zaruhi Batoyan's term in February 2019, a position she held until 2020 when she was appointed Deputy Minister of Education, Science, Culture and Sports under Arayik Harutyunyan and Vahram Dumanyan until 12 December 2022. On 13 December 2022, Andreasyan was appointed Minister of Education, Science, Culture and Sports by Prime Minister Nikol Pashinyan.

== Personal life ==
She is married to journalist and broadcaster Petros Ghazaryan, with whom she has two daughters. Aside from her native Armenian, Andreasyan is fluent in English and Russian.
