= Gevork Minaskanian =

Gevork Minaskanian is a former professor in the Department of Chemistry at Virginia Commonwealth University and Co-founder/Vice President of Synthetic Chemistry at Aderis Pharmaceuticals who was a contributor to the development of rotigotine and Neupro (a transdermal patch that delivers rotigotine). Rotigotine is a drug developed to mimic the actions of dopamine in the brain to help cope with restless legs syndrome and the abnormal movements (dyskinesia) found in Parkinson's disease patients. This drug is an alternative to oral medications for the treatment of Parkinson's disease, considered by the VCU Department of Chemistry as "an unprecedented medication for the benefit of millions of Parkinson's patient worldwide." Minaskanian's main contribution to Neupro was improving the efficiency of manufacturing rotigotine, thereby making the process commercially viable and enabling patients to afford this important medication. Minaskanian is the inventor and author of over 50 patents and publications in various fields of organic and medicinal chemistry. Some of his US patents include patents 5,470,848; 4,801,586; 5,234,959; 5,118,676; and other related research done on rotigotine and Neupro US patent 7,309,497 found in the United States Patent and Trademark Office linked to the penetration enhancers for transdermal delivery of systemic agents.
