= Yerevan State Medical University =

Medical university in Yerevan, Armenia

Mkhitar Heratsi Yerevan State Medical University
- Երեվանի Մխիթար Հերացու անվան Պետական Բժշկական Համալսարան
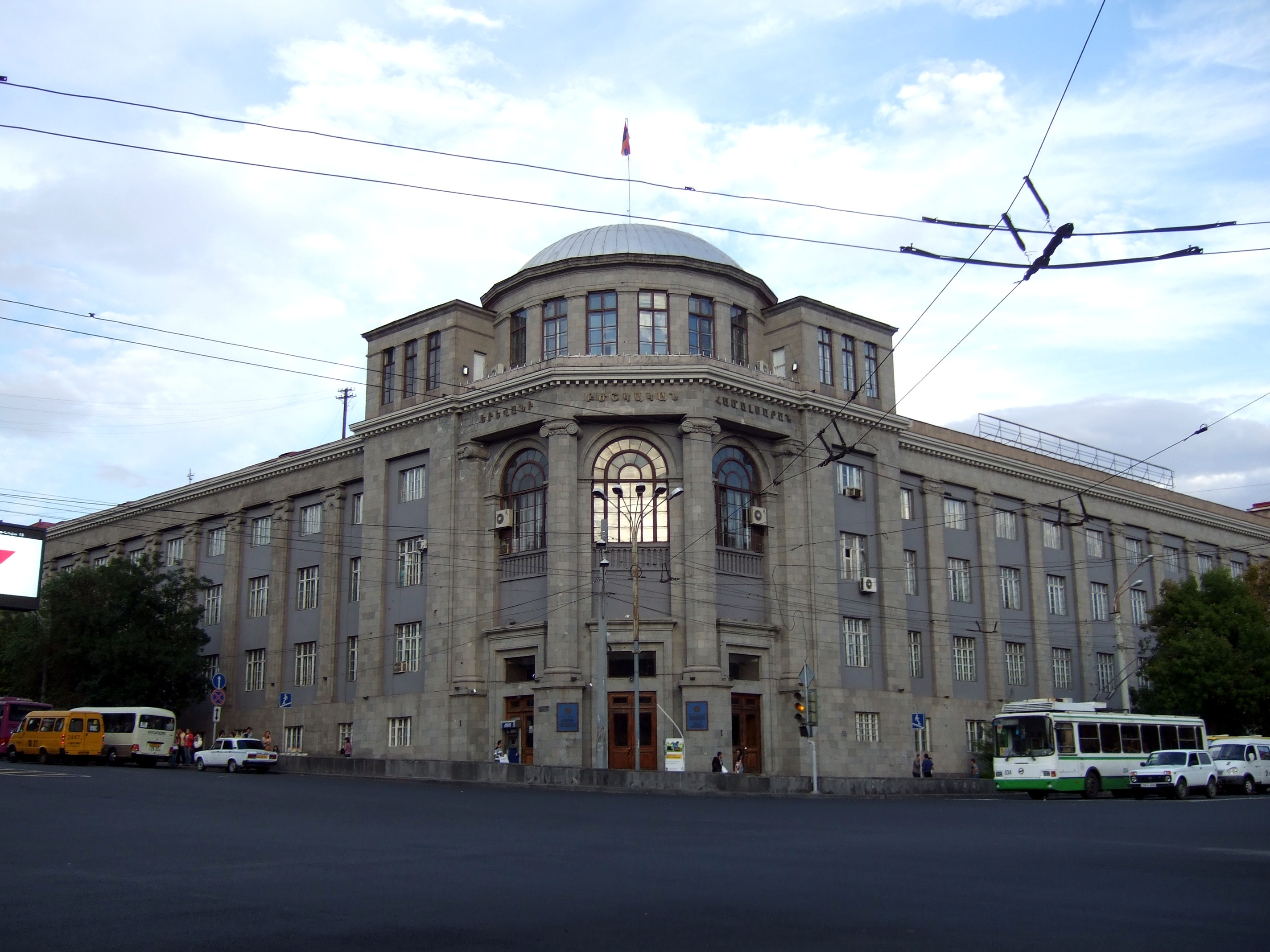
- Other names: YSMU
- Type: Public
- Established: 1920; 106 years ago
- Rector: Armen A. Muradyan
- Students: 8,000
- Location: Yerevan, Armenia; 40°11′16.02″N 44°31′31.15″E
- Website: ysmu.net
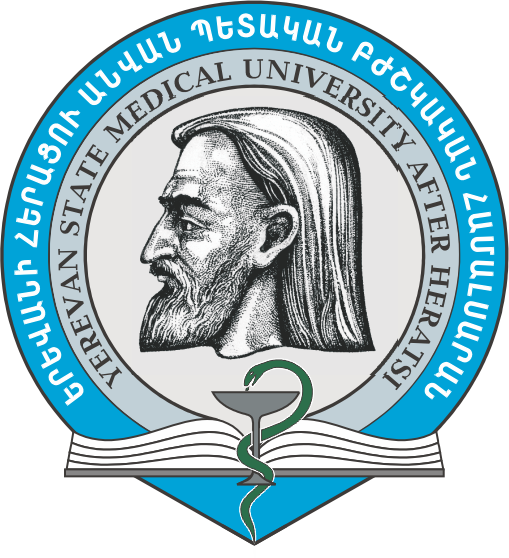

The Mkhitar Heratsi Yerevan State Medical University (YSMU, Armenian: Երեվանի Մխիթար Հերացու անվան Պետական Բժշկական Համալսարան), is an Armenian medical university located in Yerevan, Armenia.

== History ==
On 31 January 1920, during the First Republic of Armenia, the People's University of Armenia opened in Alexandropol, with the presence of prime minister Alexander Khatisian and minister of culture and public education Nikol Aghbalian. In October of the same year, a decision was passed by then-minister of education Gevorg Ghazarian to establish the faculty of medicine in the university. However, due to political circumstances, the plan was never fulfilled. Armenia became a republic in December 1920.

In 1920, the medical faculty of Yerevan was founded by the government of Armenia.

On 25 May 1989 Yerevan State Medical University was named after the 12th-century Armenian physician Mkhitar Heratsi.

== Campuses and hospitals ==
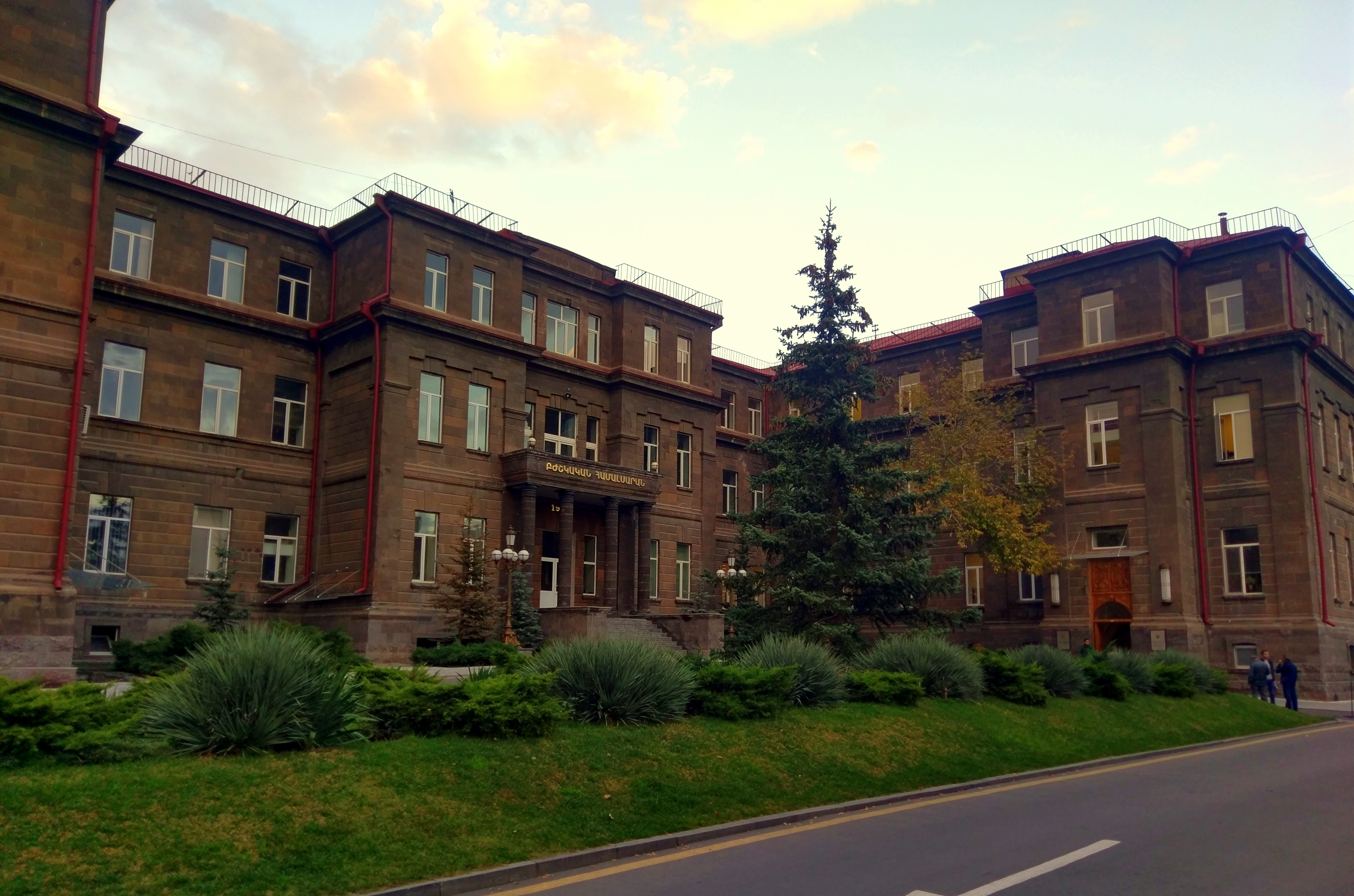
Heratsi Hospital

The Medical University's campus is located in the center of the city on Koryun street. It is home to the following buildings:

- Main university building
- Administrative building
- Laboratory building
- Anatomical building
- Dental clinics building

Two hospitals operate under the jurisdiction of the Yerevan Medical University, where students complete practical experience. The Heratsi Hospital Complex No.1 is located near the university complex, while the Muratsan Hospital Complex is located in the Erebuni District of Yerevan.

== Organization and administration ==
The management of the Yerevan State Medical University is carried out according to legislation of the Republic of Armenia and the Charter of the university, on the basis of self-governance, in conjunction with the principles of sole management and collegiality.

The university's governing bodies are the council, the rector, the scientific council, and the rectorate. The council is composed of 32 members and is drawn from the university professoriate, students, representatives of the Armenian government, the Ministry of Education and Science. The primary objectives of the University Council are the selection of the university rector, the university's development as well as the major directions of international cooperation, with the rector's presentation. The Board also debates and approves the university budget.

=== Faculties ===
Currently, YSMU has seven faculties:

- Faculty of General Medicine
- Faculty Stomatology
- Faculty of Pharmacy
- Faculty of Public Health
- Faculty of Military Medicine
- Professional and Continuing Education Centre
- Dean's Office of International Student's Education

The chair of each faculty is the dean; the faculty committees manage each of them. The dean reports to the vice-Rector, who in turn reports to the rector. The current rector is Armen Muradyan, and the chair of the board is Armen Ashotyan.

== Academics ==
=== Programs ===
The duration of the continuous and integrated educational program for bachelor's degree is six years in general medicine and military medical faculties and five years in the dental faculty. The duration of the Bachelor's Qualification Education Program is four years in the Faculty of Pharmacy.

Master's degree is offered in the following specializations:

- Medicine,
- Public Health and Health Care
- Pharmacy
- Medical work in the armed forces

=== Research ===
Foundation's faculty has 689 employees with a scientific degree, including 165 doctors of sciences, 524 candidates. As of December 2016, 28 post-graduate students and 96 applicants implement research activities in the fund.

=== Cooperation and international relations ===
Yerevan State Medical University has international membership in:

- Association of Dental Education in Europe (ADEE)
- International Association of Universities (IAU)
- International Federation of Medical Students Association (IFMSA)
- International Pharmaceutical Students Federation (IPSF)
- International Federation of Dental Students Association (IFDSA)
- SGroup European Universities' Network (SGroup)

It is also included in international educational and scientific program such as Tacis-Tempus and World Bank.

=== Libraries ===
YSMU University Library has a collection of research and academic materials.

There is also an online library comprising study materials, tests, and questionnaire, which are available to both students and interested people.

== Yerevan State Basic Medical College ==
The Yerevan State Basic Medical College is an intermediate technical college opened in 1996, operating under the administration of the Yerevan State Medical University. The college provides 2-year study programs in 5 fields:

- Dental Laboratory Technician,
- Medicine,
- Pharmaceuticals,
- Laboratory Diagnosis,
- Nursing (female).

== People ==
=== Students ===
The university has more than 8000 students. 24% of these students are international students from 26 countries.

=== Faculty and staff ===
The university has more than 1100 professors.

=== Honorary Doctor Award ===
YSMU's University Honorary Doctor Award was conferred to many remarkable and distinguished people.

- Tom Catena, Doctor in Sudan's Nuba mountains, winner of Aurora prize
- Princess Dina Mired of Jordan, director general of King Hussein Cancer Foundation (KHCF), the chairwoman of the Union of International Cancer Control, the Princess of Jordan
- Bhairon Singh Shekhawat, Indian former vice-president
- Hagop Kantarjian, professor from the University of Texas MD Anderson Cancer Center
- Agop Bedikian, from the University of Texas MD Anderson Cancer Center
- Aaron Ciechanover, Israeli biologist and winner of the Nobel prize in Chemistry
- Klaus-Peter Hellriegel, chairman of the Berlin Cancer Society, secretary and board member of the German Society of Hematology and Oncology
- Nirmal K.Ganguly, president of the Jawaharlal Institute of Post Graduate Medical Education
- Leo Bokeria, cardiologist, heart surgeon, professor, academician, Head of Bakulev Scientific Center of Cardiovascular Surgery, Russia
- Philippe Jeanty, scientist in the field of prenatal diagnosis, the founder of prenatal echocardiography
- Edgar M. Housepian, neurosurgeon and professor
- Levon Nazarian, professor and vice chairman of the Department of Radiology and the Residency Program Director at Thomas Jefferson University Hospital in Philadelphia
- Leonid Roshal, chairman of International Charity Fund to Help Children in Disasters and Wars, expert for the World Health Organization
- Karine Sargsyan, founding managing director of Biobank Graz, leader of MSC Biobanking, Scientific Director of Oncobiobank at Cedars Sinai Medical Center, expert, key-Note speaker, futurist

== Alumni ==
Alumni of the university include:

- Ara Babloyan, President of the National Assembly of Armenia
- Emil Gabrielian, Pharmacologist and Surgeon, Minister of Health of Armenian SSR
- Varvava Gabrielyan, pathologist, Honored Doctor of the Armenian SSR
- Bella Qocharyan, the former First Lady of Armenia
- Ruben Jaghinyan, Chairman of the Council of Public TV and Radio Company of Armenia
- Vahan Artsruni, Armenian rock musician, singer, composer and artist
- Garik Martirosyan, comedian, TV host, actor
- Karine Sargsyan, doctor, scientist, key-not speaker, foresight scientist
