= Levon Mkrtchyan =

Armenian director (born 1953)

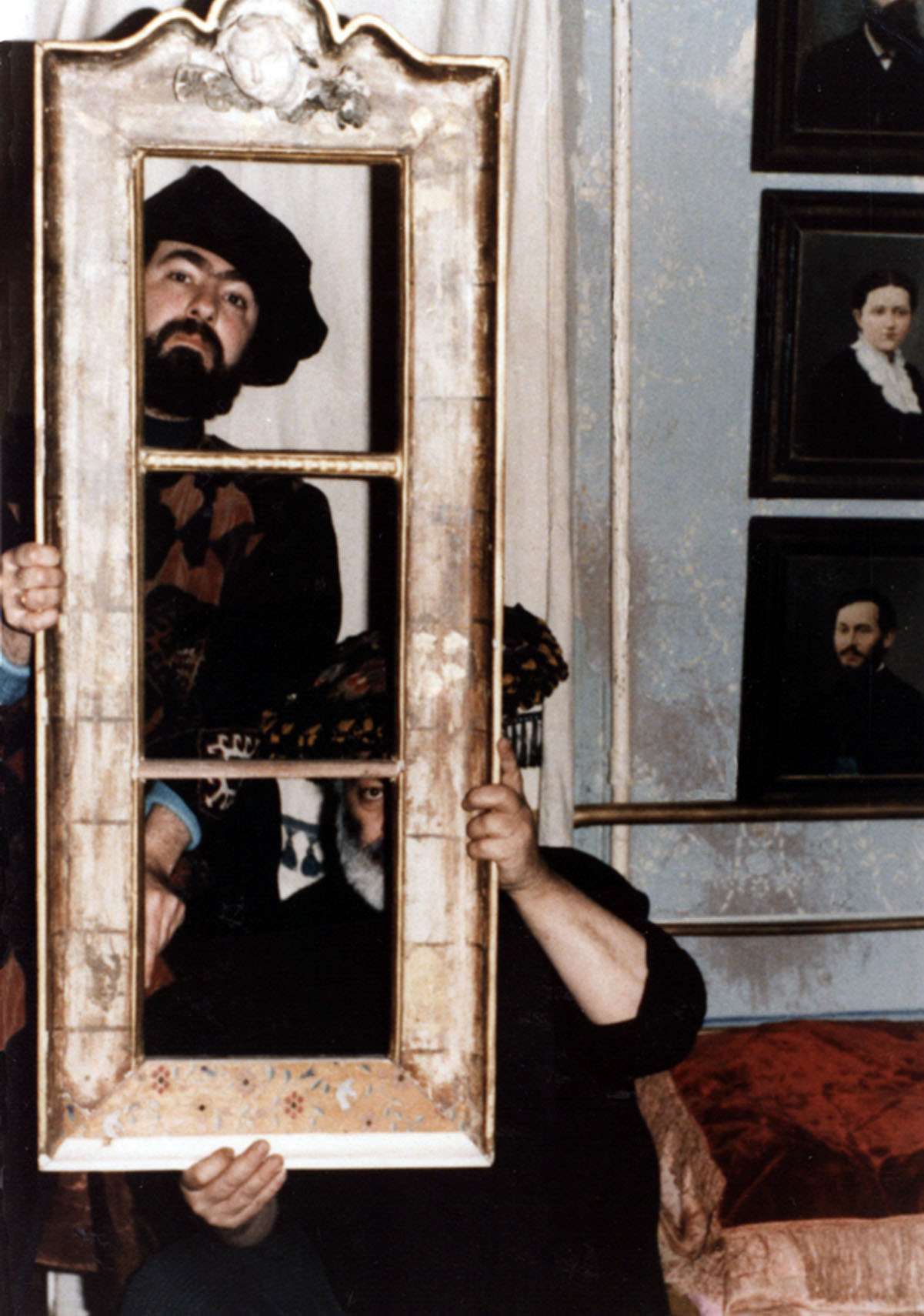
- Levon Mkrtchyan and Sergei Parajanov.
- Born: February 25, 1953 (age 73); Leninakan (now Gyumri)
- Occupation: Film director

Levon Mkrtchyan (Armenian: Լևոն Մկրտչյան; Russian: Левон Гайкович Мкртчян; born February 25, 1953, in Leninakan (now Gyumri) is an Armenian director, known for his documentary films about Armenian culture and history, such as Davit Anhaght, Charents: Known and Unknown Sides, Jean Garzu, Mesrop Mashtots, My Komitas, And There Was Light, The Book of Independence. He has received the highest award of the Soviet Union, the Lenin Prize. He has earned numerous awards for his documentaries. His last prestigious award was received during the Golden Eagle film festival for his film The Book of Independence, in the Best Documentary category. He studied in the Directing Department of the Yerevan Fine Arts and Theater Institute. In 1978, he released his debut short film The Muses. In 1984, he graduated from the Directing Department of the All-Union State Institute of Cinematography (VGIK) in Moscow. Since 1978, he has shot thirty-three documentaries. He has made a number of films about well known Armenians, including the only film footage of Hovhannes Shiraz, footage of Charles Aznavour visiting Armenia after the 1988 earthquake, as well as the funeral of William Saroyan. He was a close friend and film partner with the Armenian director Sergei Parajanov, and has a rare footage of him, including the last days of his life.

== Filmography ==
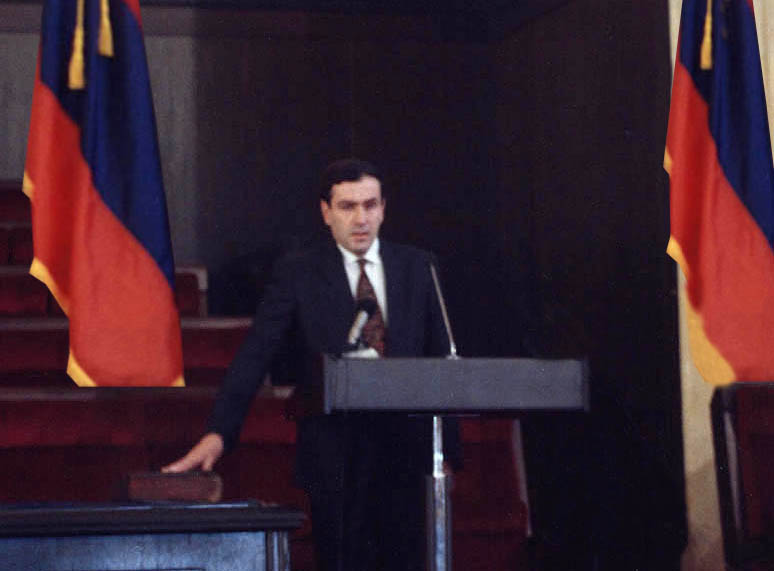
Shot from The Manuscript of Independence (Matyan ankakhutyan) showing first President of Armenia Levon Ter-Petrosyan

- 1983: On the Path to Eternity (about Hovhannes Shiraz)
- 1984: Paruyr Sevak
- 1987: Gyumri
- 1987: Charents: Known and Unknown Sides
- 1988: Mesrop Mashtots
- 1989: Curfew (Paretayin Zham)
- 1989: Charles Aznavour Armenia
- 1990: General Andranik (Zoravar Andranik)
- 1993: Armenian Kingdom of Cilicia (Kilikiayi haykakan tagavorutyune)
- 1996: 5 years in Armenia
- 2001: And There Was Light (Yev yeghav luys)
- 2002: The Book of Independence (Matyan ankakhutyan)
- 2005: Hovhannes Shiraz: A Documentary
- 2007: We Love Armenia

== Publications ==
- Documentary Films of the Armenian Soviet Republic, Berlin, 1990
- Armenian Association of Film - Critics and Cinema - Journalists, 1924-1999
- Armenians - Author Toros Toranian, Aleppo, Syria, 1998 (Թող Հայաստանը Խոսի)
