= Gevorg Melik-Karagyozyan =

Armenian politician

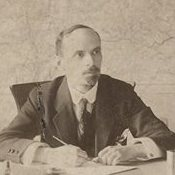

Minister of Enlightenment (Public Education and Art) of the First Republic of Armenia
- In office December 04, 1918 – June 24, 1919
- Prime Minister: Hovhannes Katchaznouni Alexander Khatisyan
- Preceded by: Mikael Atabekyan
- Succeeded by: Sirakan Tigranyan

Gevorg Melik-Karagyozyan (Armenian: Գևորգ Մելիք-Ղարագյոզյան) was an Armenian politician who served as Minister of Enlightenment (Public Education and Art) of the First Republic of Armenia from 1918 to 1919.
