= Gevorg Abajian =

- Born: December 12, 1920; Shnogh village, Lori Province, Soviet Armenia
- Died: 2002 (aged 81–82); Yerevan, Armenia
- Occupation(s): Theatrical and literary critic

Gevorg Hambardzumi Abajian (Armenian: Գևորգ Համբարձումի Աբաջյան, December 12, 1920, Shnogh village, Lori Province, Armenia – 2002, Yerevan) was an Armenian theatrical and literary critic. PhD on Philology (1956), awarded by the Renowned Activist of Armenian SSR Arts title in 1972.

Abajian was a World War II veteran. Starting in 1945 he was an artist of Gyumri Dramatic Theatre, then chief-editor of the cultural programs of Armenian SSR state TV-committee, the head of press-department of the Committee of Cultural Relations with Armenian diaspora. He is an author of many books, novels and articles.

== Books ==
- Suren Surenian, Yerevan, 1959
- Isahak Alikhanian, Yerevan, 1967

== Sources ==
- Armenian Concise Encyclopedia, Ed. by acad. K. Khudaverdian, Yerevan, 1990, Vol. 1, p. 8
