= Gevorg Ghazaryan (politician) =

Armenian politician

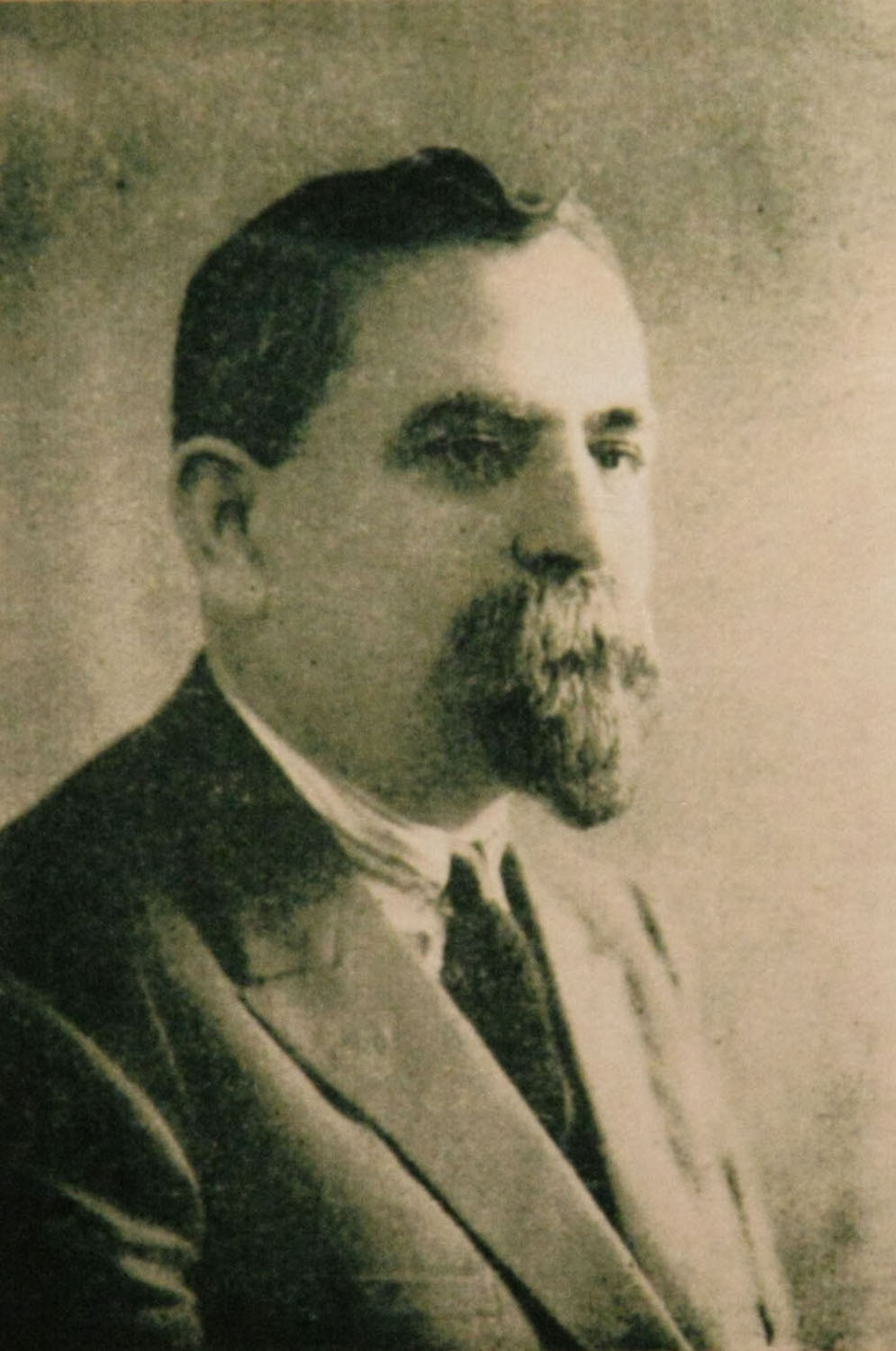

Minister of Enlightenment (Public Education and Art) of the First Republic of Armenia
- In office May 5, 1920 – November 23, 1920
- Prime Minister: Hamo Ohanjanyan
- Preceded by: Nikol Aghbalyan
- Succeeded by: Vahan Minakhoryan

Gevorg Ghazaryan (Armenian: Գևորգ Ղազարյան) was an Armenian politician who served as Minister of Enlightenment (Public Education and Art) of the First Republic of Armenia in 1920.
