= Vahan Minakhoryan =

Armenian politician (1884–1946)

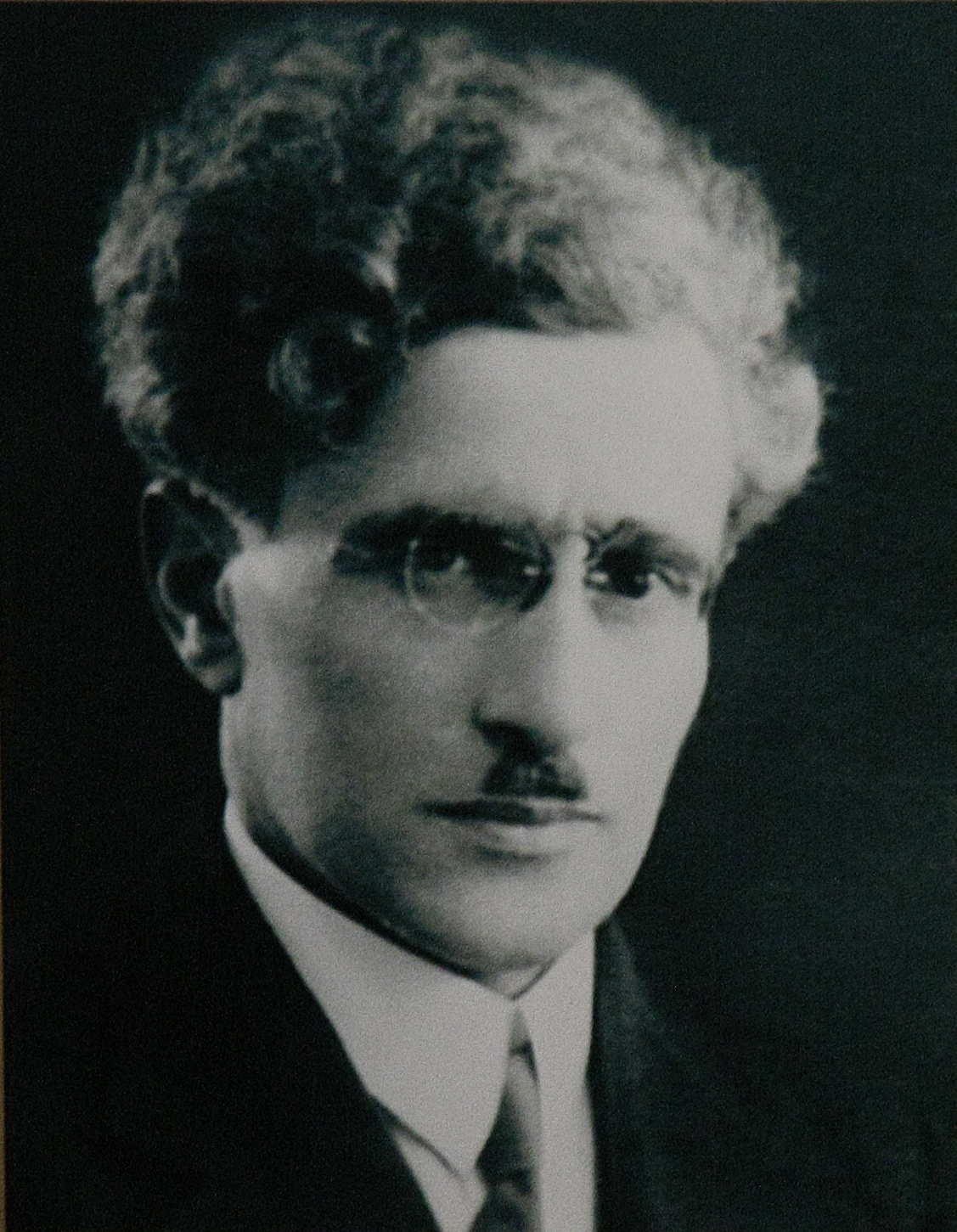

Vahan Minakhoryan (Armenian: Վահան Մինախորեան; 1884–1946) was a politician of the early 20th century in Armenia. He was also a prominent member and spokesman of the Social-Revolutionary Party of Armenia.

In 1919 he openly rejected the Armenian Revolutionary Federation decision to use regular army units for subduing Muslim revolts in Yerevan province of Armenia in 1919. However, he did not succeed in making this happen and the Armenian Revolutionary Federation continued its governmental policy of utilizing the national army to suppress the revolts.

Minakhoryan was an adamant supporter of establishing bi-literal relations between Armenia and Turkey, which as he believed, would allow Armenia to gain some of the lost Western Armenian regions of Van, Bitlis and Erzurum and thereby creating a state smaller than the borders of Armenia, but which also allowed the development and security of its borders. He also believed that this will prevent and protect any sort of unjustified Turkish and Azeri actions against Armenia in the future. These ideas were taken as absurd by governing Armenian Revolutionary Federation leadership at the time.
