= Celebrities in Africa =

- Created by: Tina Kandelaki; Arkady Vodakhov
- Directed by: Lika Blank; Tatiana Mironova
- Presented by: Olga Buzova; Mikhail Galustyan
- No. of series: 6 + 1

Production
- Executive producers: Natalia Ochigava; Konstantin Obukhov
- Production locations: South Africa, Kruger National Park (1–4); Dominican Republic, Los Haitises National Park (5–); Colombia, Tayrona National Park (All-Stars)
- Running time: 60–120 min
- Production company: Plan B Media

Original release
- Network: TNT
- Release: 19 September 2021 – present

Celebrities in Africa (Russian: Звёзды в Африке) is a Russian reality television show, that broadcast on TNT. The format sees a group of celebrities living together in the camp and undertaking team challenges to avoid being voted out by fellow participants and to secure the prize pot (1 star equals 100.000; peak bank is 15 million rubles), half of which will be given to selected charity. The programme was filmed within Kruger National Park, South Africa and hosted by Olga Buzova and Mikhail Galustyan.

It was the Russian version of the international franchise I'm a Celebrity...Get Me Out of Here!, however since 2023 it airs without ITV Studios' involvement in the production.

From 2024 the location had changed to Los Haitises National Park, Dominican Republic as well as the name to Celebrities in Jungle (Russian: Звёзды в Джунглях).

In 2026 an All-Stars special was held to celebrate the five years anniversary with Tayrona National Park, Colombia as the recording spot.

Despite some accusations in staged results and scripted dialogues, two times awarded for "the most-watched TV show online": consistently scored top views on Rutube.

== Series overview ==
Series	Cast	Total	Episodes	Originally released		Winner	Runner-up	Third place
Series	Cast	Total	Episodes	First released	Last released	Winner	Runner-up	Third place
1	17	12.300.000₽	15	19 September 2021	26 December 2021	Vyacheslav Malafeev	Anna Khilkevich	Svetlana Permyakova
2	17	12.500.000₽	15	20 February 2022	29 May 2022	Oleg Vereshchagin	Karina Kross	Valya Karnaval
3	17	11.400.000₽	15	12 March 2023	18 June 2023	Alexander Stepanov	Natalia Bardo	Maria Pogrebnyak
4	17	13.400.000₽	15	17 September 2023	24 December 2023	Evgenia Iskandarova	Karina Koks	Karina Nigay
5	17	11.600.000₽	15	15 September 2024	22 December 2024	Egor Chekhov	Natan Mirov	Alena Zhigalova
6	17	11.300.000₽	15	14 September 2025	21 December 2025	Renat Mukhambaev	Asya Reznik	Anna Tsukanova-Kott

=== Series 1 (2021) ===
Celebrity	Known for	Entered	Exited	Finished
Vyacheslav Malafeev	Football goalkeeper	Day 1	Day 30	1st
Anna Khilkevich	Univer actress	Day 1	Day 30	2nd
Svetlana Permyakova	Interns actress	Day 1	Day 30	3rd
Viki Odintcova	Instagram blogger	Day 1	Day 28	4th
Stas Yarushin	Univer actor	Day 1	Day 26	5th
Alexey Yagudin	Figure skater	Day 1	Day 24	6th
Vladimir Selivanov	Real guys actor	Day 5	Day 22	7th
Mitya Fomin	Hi-Fi singer	Day 1	Day 20	8th
Yulia Gavrilina	TikTok blogger	Day 1	Day 18	9th
Alena Shishkova	Model	Day 11	Day 16	10th
Lena Katina	t.A.T.u singer	Day 9	Day 14	11th
Mikhail Bashkatov	KVN comedian	Day 7	Day 12	12th
Andrey Gaidulyan	Univer actor	Day 1	Day 10	13th
Roza Syabitova	Let's Get Married presenter	Day 3	Day 8	14th
Vlad Sokolovsky	BiS singer	Day 1	Day 6	15th
Aiza-Liluna Ai	Beauty salons owner	Day 1	Day 4	16th
Victoria Bonya	Journalist	Day 1	Day 2	17th

Celebrity	Episode 1	Episode 2	Episode 3	Episode 4	Episode 5	Episode 6	Episode 7	Episode 8	Episode 9	Episode 10	Episode 11	Episode 12	Episode 13	Episode 14	Episode 15	
Vyacheslav	Safe	Safe	Safe	Immunity	Safe	Risk	Safe	Immunity	Safe	Safe	Risk	Safe	Immunity	Safe	SAFE	1st
Anna	Safe	Safe	Immunity	Safe	Safe	Safe	Safe	Risk	Risk	Safe	Safe	Immunity	Safe	Immunity	SAFE	2nd
Svetlana	Risk	Safe	Safe	Safe	Safe	Immunity	Safe	Safe	Safe	Immunity	Safe	Safe	Risk	Risk	OUT	3rd
Viki	Safe	Safe	Risk	Safe	Risk	Safe	Safe	Safe	Safe	Safe	Immunity	Safe	Safe	Lose	4th	
Stas	Safe	Immunity	Safe	Risk	Safe	Safe	Immunity	Safe	Safe	Risk	Safe	Risk	Lose	5th		
Alexey	Immunity	Safe	Safe	Safe	Safe	Safe	Safe	Safe	Safe	Safe	Safe	Lose	6th			
Vladimir	Not in	Not in	New	Safe	Immunity	Safe	Safe	Safe	Safe	Safe	Lose	7th				
Mitya	Safe	Risk	Safe	Safe	Safe	Safe	Safe	Safe	Immunity	Lose	8th					
Yulia	Safe	Safe	Safe	Safe	Safe	Safe	Risk	Safe	Lose	9th						
Alena	Not in	Not in	Not in	Not in	Not in	New	Safe	Lose	10th							
Lena	Not in	Not in	Not in	Not in	New	Safe	Lose	11th								
Mikhail	Not in	Not in	Not in	New	Safe	Lose	12th									
Andrey	Safe	Safe	Safe	Safe	Lose	13th										
Roza	Not in	New	Safe	Lose	14th											
Vlad	Safe	Safe	Lose	15th												
Aiza	Safe	Lose	16th													
Victoria	Lose	17th														
Money added	1.000.000₽	1.000.000₽	600.000₽	800.000₽	700.000₽	1.000.000₽	600.000₽	900.000₽	500.000₽	1.000.000₽	700.000₽	1.000.000₽	800.000₽	700.000₽	1.000.000₽	12.300.000₽
Leader	Alexey	Stas	Anna	Vyacheslav	Vladimir	Svetlana	Stas	Vyacheslav	Mitya	Svetlana	Viki	Anna	Vyacheslav	Anna	Vyacheslav	
Elimination challenge	Svetlana	Mitya	Viki	Stas	Viki	Vyacheslav	Yulya	Anna	Anna	Stas	Vyacheslav	Stas	Svetlana	Svetlana	Vyacheslav	
Elimination challenge	Victoria	Aiza	Vlad	Roza	Andrey	Mikhail	Lena	Alena	Yulya	Mitya	Vladimir	Alexey	Stas	Viki	Svetlana	Anna

=== Series 2 (2022) ===
Celebrity	Known for	Entered	Exited	Finished
Oleg Vereshchagin	Comedy Woman comedian	Day 1	Day 30	1st
Karina Kross	Instagram blogger	Day 1	Day 30	2nd
Valya Karnaval	TikTok blogger	Day 1	Day 30	3rd
Anya Pokrov	TikTok blogger	Day 5	Day 28	4th
Vyacheslav Chepurchenko	Zhuki actor	Day 1	Day 26	5th
Vladimir Sychev	Fizruk actor	Day 3	Day 24	6th
Roman Yunusov	Comedy Club comedian	Day 11	Day 22	7th
Nikita Dzhigurda	Russian Love actor	Day 9	Day 20	8th
Anatoly Tsoy	MBAND singer	Day 1	Day 18	9th
Alena Vodonaeva	Journalist	Day 1	Day 16	10th
Natalia Rudova	Univer actress	Day 1	Day 14	11th
Alina Alexeeva	Choreographer	Day 1	Day 12	12th
Anton Ivanov	Comedy Club comedian	Day 7	Day 10	13th
Ruslan Nigmatullin	Football goalkeeper	Day 1	Day 8	14th
Maxim Lagashkin	Zhuki actor	Day 1	Day 6	15th
Sasha Stone	MMA fighter	Day 1	Day 4	16th
Karolina Sevastyanova	Rhythmic gymnast	Day 1	Day 2	17th

Celebrity	Episode 1	Episode 2	Episode 3	Episode 4	Episode 5	Episode 6	Episode 7	Episode 8	Episode 9	Episode 10	Episode 11	Episode 12	Episode 13	Episode 14	Episode 15	
Oleg	Safe	Risk	Risk	Immunity	Safe	Safe	Safe	Safe	Immunity	Safe	Immunity	Risk	Risk	Risk	SAFE	1st
Karina	Immunity	Safe	Safe	Safe	Safe	Risk	Immunity	Safe	Safe	Safe	Safe	Safe	Safe	Immunity	SAFE	2nd
Valya	Safe	Safe	Safe	Safe	Safe	Safe	Risk	Immunity	Safe	Safe	Safe	Safe	Safe	Safe	OUT	3rd
Anya	Not in	Not in	New	Safe	Risk	Safe	Safe	Safe	Safe	Immunity	Risk	Safe	Immunity	Lose	4th	
Vyacheslav	Risk	Safe	Safe	Safe	Safe	Safe	Safe	Risk	Safe	Safe	Safe	Immunity	Lose	5th		
Vladimir	Not in	New	Safe	Risk	Safe	Safe	Safe	Safe	Safe	Risk	Safe	Lose	6th			
Roman	Not in	Not in	Not in	Not in	Not in	New	Safe	Safe	Risk	Safe	Lose	7th				
Nikita	Not in	Not in	Not in	Not in	New	Safe	Safe	Safe	Safe	Lose	8th					
Anatoly	Safe	Safe	Safe	Safe	Safe	Safe	Safe	Safe	Lose	9th						
Alena	Safe	Immunity	Safe	Safe	Safe	Immunity	Safe	Lose	10th							
Natalia	Safe	Safe	Immunity	Safe	Immunity	Safe	Lose	11th								
Alina	Safe	Safe	Safe	Safe	Safe	Lose	12th									
Anton	Not in	Not in	Not in	New	Lose	13th										
Ruslan	Safe	Safe	Safe	Lose	14th											
Maxim	Safe	Safe	Lose	15th												
Sasha	Safe	Lose	16th													
Karolina	Lose	17th														
Money added	800.000₽	1.000.000₽	1.000.000₽	900.000₽	700.000₽	800.000₽	1.000.000₽	700.000₽	900.000₽	400.000₽	1.000.000₽	1.000.000₽	600.000₽	700.000₽	1.000.000₽	12.500.000₽
Leader	Karina	Alena	Natalia	Oleg	Natalia	Alena	Karina	Valya	Oleg	Anya	Oleg	Vyacheslav	Anya	Karina	Oleg	
Elimination challenge	Vyacheslav	Oleg	Oleg	Vladimir	Anya	Karina	Valya	Vyacheslav	Roman	Vladimir	Anya	Oleg	Oleg	Oleg	Oleg	
Elimination challenge	Karolina	Sasha	Maxim	Ruslan	Anton	Alina	Natalia	Alena	Anatoly	Nikita	Roman	Vladimir	Vyacheslav	Anya	Valya	Karina

=== Series 3 (2023) ===
Celebrity	Known for	Entered	Exited	Finished
Alexander Stepanov	Rapper	Day 3	Day 30	1st
Natalia Bardo	Girls with Makarov actress	Day 11	Day 30	2nd
Maria Pogrebnyak	Instagram blogger	Day 1	Day 30	3rd
Denis Lebedev	Boxer	Day 1	Day 28	4th
Igor Oznobikhin	Real guys actor	Day 1	Day 26	5th
Tornike Kvitatiani	The Voice star	Day 1	Day 24	6th
Natalia Medvedeva	Comedy Woman comedienne	Day 1	Day 22	7th
Maria Kravchenko	Comedy Woman comedienne	Day 1	Day 20	8th
Dmitry Kozhoma	KVN comedian	Day 1	Day 18	9th
Ivan Pyshnenko	KVN comedian	Day 1	Day 16	10th
Zoya Berber	Real guys actress	Day 7	Day 14	11th
Semyon Molokanov	Screenwriter	Day 9	Day 12	12th
Omar Alibutaev	Once in Russia comedian	Day 1	Day 10	13th
Andrey Sviridov	Univer actor	Day 5	Day 8	14th
Alina Akilova	Instagram blogger	Day 1	Day 6	15th
Evelina Bledans	Maski-show actress	Day 1	Day 4	16th
Vitaly Gogunsky	Univer actor	Day 1	Day 2	17th

Celebrity	Episode 1	Episode 2	Episode 3	Episode 4	Episode 5	Episode 6	Episode 7	Episode 8	Episode 9	Episode 10	Episode 11	Episode 12	Episode 13	Episode 14	Episode 15	
Alexander	Not in	New	Safe	Safe	Safe	Risk	Safe	Safe	Immunity	Safe	Safe	Safe	Risk	Risk	SAFE	1st
Natalia B.	Not in	Not in	Not in	Not in	Not in	New	Risk	Safe	Safe	Safe	Immunity	Safe	Safe	Safe	SAFE	2nd
Maria P.	Safe	Risk	Safe	Safe	Safe	Safe	Safe	Immunity	Safe	Risk	Safe	Safe	Safe	Immunity	OUT	3rd
Denis	Safe	Safe	Safe	Safe	Safe	Immunity	Immunity	Safe	Safe	Immunity	Risk	Risk	Immunity	Lose	4th	
Igor	Safe	Safe	Safe	Safe	Risk	Safe	Safe	Risk	Safe	Safe	Safe	Immunity	Lose	5th		
Tornike	Risk	Immunity	Immunity	Safe	Safe	Safe	Safe	Safe	Risk	Safe	Safe	Lose	6th			
Natalia M.	Immunity	Safe	Risk	Risk	Safe	Safe	Safe	Safe	Safe	Safe	Lose	7th				
Maria K.	Safe	Safe	Safe	Immunity	Safe	Safe	Safe	Safe	Safe	Lose	8th					
Dmitry	Safe	Safe	Safe	Safe	Immunity	Safe	Safe	Safe	Lose	9th						
Ivan	Safe	Safe	Safe	Safe	Safe	Safe	Safe	Lose	10th							
Zoya	Not in	Not in	Not in	New	Safe	Safe	Lose	11th								
Semyon	Not in	Not in	Not in	Not in	New	Lose	12th									
Omar	Safe	Safe	Safe	Safe	Lose	13th										
Andrey	Not in	Not in	New	Lose	14th											
Alina	Safe	Safe	Lose	15th												
Evelina	Safe	Lose	16th													
Vitaly	Lose	17th														
Money added	1.000.000₽	700.000₽	500.000₽	800.000₽	600.000₽	1.000.000₽	1.000.000₽	600.000₽	900.000₽	700.000₽	800.000₽	800.000₽	1.000.000₽	400.000₽	600.000₽	11.400.000₽
Leader	Natalia M.	Tornike	Tornike	Maria K.	Dmitry	Denis	Denis	Maria P.	Alexander	Denis	Natalia B.	Igor	Denis	Maria P.	Alexander	
Elimination challenge	Tornike	Maria P.	Natalia M.	Natalia M.	Igor	Alexander	Natalia B.	Igor	Tornike	Maria P.	Denis	Denis	Alexander	Alexander	Alexander	
Elimination challenge	Vitaly	Evelina	Alina	Andrey	Omar	Semyon	Zoya	Ivan	Dmitry	Maria K.	Natalia M.	Tornike	Igor	Denis	Maria P.	Natalia B.

=== Series 4 (2023) ===
Celebrity	Known for	Entered	Exited	Finished
Evgenia Iskandarova	Stand-Up comedienne	Day 1	Day 30	1st
Karina Koks	Slivki singer	Day 1	Day 30	2nd
Karina Nigay	Fashion stylist	Day 3	Day 30	3rd
Anton Filipenko	Film director	Day 9	Day 28	4th
Konstantin Malasaev	KVN comedian	Day 5	Day 26	5th
Yana Enzhaeva	Holidays actress	Day 11	Day 24	6th
Prokhor Shalyapin	Socialite	Day 7	Day 22	7th
Alexander Ptashenchuk	Once in Russia comedian	Day 1	Day 20	8th
Elena Borshcheva	Comedy Woman comedienne	Day 1	Day 18	9th
Oskar Kuchera	Radio personality	Day 1	Day 16	10th
Yulia Topolnitskaya	Unprincipled actress	Day 1	Day 14	11th
Mikhail Stognienko	Once in Russia comedian	Day 1	Day 12	12th
Violetta Chikovani	Instagram blogger	Day 1	Day 10	13th
Maria Skornitskaya	Real guys actress	Day 1	Day 8	14th
Irakly Pirtskhalava	Fabrika zvezd star	Day 1	Day 6	15th
Vlad Topalov	Smash!! singer	Day 1	Day 4	16th
Vic Wild	Snowboarder	Day 1	Day 2	17th

Celebrity	Episode 1	Episode 2	Episode 3	Episode 4	Episode 5	Episode 6	Episode 7	Episode 8	Episode 9	Episode 10	Episode 11	Episode 12	Episode 13	Episode 14	Episode 15	
Evgenia	Safe	Immunity	Safe	Safe	Immunity	Safe	Safe	Safe	Immunity	Risk	Safe	Safe	Risk	Risk	SAFE	1st
Karina K.	Safe	Safe	Safe	Immunity	Safe	Safe	Risk	Safe	Risk	Safe	Safe	Risk	Immunity	Safe	SAFE	2nd
Karina N.	Not in	New	Safe	Safe	Risk	Safe	Immunity	Safe	Safe	Safe	Safe	Safe	Safe	Immunity	OUT	3rd
Anton	Not in	Not in	Not in	Not in	New	Safe	Safe	Safe	Safe	Safe	Risk	Immunity	Safe	Lose	4th	
Konstantin	Not in	Not in	New	Safe	Safe	Safe	Safe	Immunity	Safe	Safe	Safe	Safe	Lose	5th		
Yana	Not in	Not in	Not in	Not in	Not in	New	Safe	Safe	Safe	Immunity	Immunity	Lose	6th			
Prokhor	Not in	Not in	Not in	New	Safe	Safe	Safe	Safe	Safe	Safe	Lose	7th				
Alexander	Immunity	Safe	Risk	Safe	Safe	Immunity	Safe	Safe	Safe	Lose	8th					
Elena	Safe	Safe	Safe	Risk	Safe	Safe	Safe	Risk	Lose	9th						
Oskar	Risk	Safe	Safe	Safe	Safe	Risk	Safe	Lose	10th							
Yulia	Safe	Risk	Safe	Safe	Safe	Safe	Lose	11th								
Mikhail	Safe	Safe	Safe	Safe	Safe	Lose	12th									
Violetta	Safe	Safe	Immunity	Safe	Lose	13th										
Maria	Safe	Safe	Safe	Lose	14th											
Irakly	Safe	Safe	Lose	15th												
Vlad	Safe	Lose	16th													
Vic	Lose	17th														
Money added	1.000.000₽	1.000.000₽	1.000.000₽	900.000₽	1.000.000₽	800.000₽	700.000₽	1.000.000₽	800.000₽	700.000₽	900.000₽	600.000₽	1.000.000₽	1.000.000₽	1.000.000₽	13.400.000₽
Leader	Alexander	Evgenia	Violetta	Karina K.	Evgenia	Alexander	Karina N.	Konstantin	Evgenia	Yana	Yana	Anton	Karina K.	Karina N.	Evgenia	
Elimination challenge	Oskar	Yulia	Alexander	Elena	Karina N.	Oskar	Karina K.	Elena	Karina K.	Evgenia	Anton	Karina K.	Evgenia	Evgenia	Evgenia	
Elimination challenge	Vic	Vlad	Irakly	Maria	Violetta	Mikhail	Yulia	Oskar	Elena	Alexander	Prokhor	Yana	Konstantin	Anton	Karina N.	Karina K.

=== Series 5 (2024) ===
Celebrity	Known for	Entered	Exited	Finished
Egor Chekhov	Unprincipled actor	Day 1	Day 30	1st
Natan Mirov	Rapper	Day 1	Day 30	2nd
Alena Zhigalova	Interviewer	Day 1	Day 30	3rd
Alana Mamaeva	Model	Day 1	Day 28	4th
Valeria Chekalina	Fitness studios owner	Day 1	Day 26	5th
Alexander Volokhov	Comedy Woman comedian	Day 1	Day 24	6th
Vyacheslav Manucharov	Stage actor	Day 11	Day 22	7th
Bianka	Singer	Day 9	Day 20	8th
Dmitry Sorokin	Comedy Club comedian	Day 7	Day 18	9th
Igor Tsvirko	Ballet dancer	Day 3	Day 16	10th
Klava Koka	Singer	Day 1	Day 14	11th
Alexandra Zvereva	Disc jockey	Day 5	Day 12	12th
Daria Blokhina	Voice actress	Day 1	Day 10	13th
Zhenya Krivtsova	Instagram blogger	Day 1	Day 8	14th
Filipp Voronin	Once in Russia comedian	Day 1	Day 6	15th
Daniil Vakhrushev	Fizruk actor	Day 1	Day 4	16th
Dana Borisova	Army store presenter	Day 1	Day 2	17th

Celebrity	Episode 1	Episode 2	Episode 3	Episode 4	Episode 5	Episode 6	Episode 7	Episode 8	Episode 9	Episode 10	Episode 11	Episode 12	Episode 13	Episode 14	Episode 15	
Egor	Safe	Safe	Safe	Safe	Risk	Safe	Safe	Risk	Safe	Safe	Safe	Risk	Safe	Immunity	SAFE	1st
Natan	Safe	Safe	Safe	Immunity	Safe	Safe	Immunity	Safe	Risk	Safe	Risk	Safe	Immunity	Risk	SAFE	2nd
Alena	Safe	Safe	Safe	Risk	Safe	Safe	Safe	Safe	Safe	Safe	Immunity	Safe	Risk	Safe	OUT	3rd
Alana	Safe	Safe	Safe	Safe	Safe	Safe	Safe	Safe	Safe	Risk	Safe	Immunity	Safe	Lose	4th	
Valeria	Safe	Safe	Safe	Safe	Safe	Safe	Safe	Safe	Immunity	Immunity	Safe	Safe	Lose	5th		
Alexander	Safe	Risk	Risk	Safe	Safe	Safe	Safe	Safe	Safe	Safe	Safe	Lose	6th			
Vyacheslav	Not in	Not in	Not in	Not in	Not in	New	Safe	Safe	Safe	Safe	Lose	7th				
Bianka	Not in	Not in	Not in	Not in	New	Risk	Safe	Safe	Safe	Lose	8th					
Dmitry	Not in	Not in	Not in	New	Safe	Safe	Safe	Immunity	Lose	9th						
Igor	Not in	New	Safe	Safe	Immunity	Safe	Risk	Lose	10th							
Klava	Safe	Safe	Safe	Safe	Safe	Immunity	Lose	11th								
Alexandra	Not in	Not in	New	Safe	Safe	Lose	12th									
Daria	Risk	Safe	Immunity	Safe	Lose	13th										
Zhenya	Safe	Immunity	Safe	Lose	14th											
Filipp	Safe	Safe	Lose	15th												
Daniil	Immunity	Lose	16th													
Dana	Lose	17th														
Money added	700.000₽	600.000₽	1.000.000₽	1.000.000₽	800.000₽	500.000₽	900.000₽	700.000₽	600.000₽	1.000.000₽	1.000.000₽	800.000₽	900.000₽	300.000₽	800.000₽	11.600.000₽
Leader	Daniil	Zhenya	Daria	Natan	Igor	Klava	Natan	Dmitry	Valeria	Valeria	Alena	Alana	Natan	Egor	Egor	
Elimination challenge	Daria	Alexander	Alexander	Alena	Egor	Bianka	Igor	Egor	Natan	Alana	Natan	Egor	Alena	Natan	Egor	
Elimination challenge	Dana	Daniil	Filipp	Zhenya	Daria	Alexandra	Klava	Igor	Dmitry	Bianka	Vyacheslav	Alexander	Valeria	Alana	Alena	Natan

=== Series 6 (2025) ===
Celebrity	Known for	Entered	Exited	Finished
Renat Mukhambaev	KVN comedian	Day 7	Day 30	1st
Asya Reznik	Naughty actress	Day 1	Day 30	2nd
Anna Tsukanova-Kott	Silver Spoon actress	Day 5	Day 30	3rd
Andrey Minin	Comedy Club comedian	Day 1	Day 28	4th
Ekaterina Shkuro	TikTok blogger	Day 1	Day 26	5th
Aristarkh Venes	Cadetship actor	Day 1	Day 24	6th
Ramil Alimov	Rapper	Day 9	Day 22	7th
Elena Kuletskaya	Model	Day 1	Day 20	8th
Jeff Monson	Politician	Day 1	Day 18	9th
Natalia Bochkareva	Happy Together actress	Day 11	Day 16	10th
Vadim Dubrovin	Zhuki actor	Day 1	Day 14	11th
Yan Dilan	KVN comedian	Day 1	Day 12	12th
Albina Kabalina	Holidays actress	Day 1	Day 10	13th
Margo Ovsyannikova	Dom-2 star	Day 1	Day 8	14th
Marina Vetrova	Once in Russia comedienne	Day 3	Day 6	15th
Sergey Rost	Radio personality	Day 1	Day 4	16th
Masha Malinovskaya	Video jockey	Day 1	Day 2	17th

Celebrity	Episode 1	Episode 2	Episode 3	Episode 4	Episode 5	Episode 6	Episode 7	Episode 8	Episode 9	Episode 10	Episode 11	Episode 12	Episode 13	Episode 14	Episode 15	
Renat	Not in	Not in	Not in	New	Safe	Safe	Safe	Safe	Safe	Safe	Risk	Immunity	Safe	Risk	SAFE	1st
Asya	Safe	Immunity	Safe	Safe	Risk	Safe	Safe	Safe	Safe	Immunity	Safe	Safe	Risk	Immunity	SAFE	2nd
Anna	Not in	Not in	New	Safe	Immunity	Risk	Safe	Immunity	Safe	Risk	Immunity	Safe	Safe	Safe	OUT	3rd
Andrey	Safe	Safe	Safe	Safe	Safe	Safe	Immunity	Safe	Risk	Safe	Safe	Risk	Immunity	Lose	4th	
Ekaterina	Safe	Safe	Safe	Risk	Safe	Safe	Safe	Risk	Safe	Safe	Safe	Safe	Lose	5th		
Aristarkh	Safe	Risk	Safe	Immunity	Safe	Safe	Safe	Safe	Immunity	Safe	Safe	Lose	6th			
Ramil	Not in	Not in	Not in	Not in	New	Safe	Safe	Safe	Safe	Safe	Lose	7th				
Elena	Safe	Safe	Risk	Safe	Safe	Immunity	Safe	Safe	Safe	Lose	8th					
Jeff	Immunity	Safe	Safe	Safe	Safe	Safe	Risk	Safe	Lose	9th						
Natalia	Not in	Not in	Not in	Not in	Not in	New	Safe	Lose	10th							
Vadim	Risk	Safe	Safe	Safe	Safe	Safe	Lose	11th								
Yan	Safe	Safe	Safe	Safe	Safe	Lose	12th									
Albina	Safe	Safe	Safe	Safe	Lose	13th										
Margo	Safe	Safe	Immunity	Lose	14th											
Marina	Not in	New	Lose	15th												
Sergey	Safe	Lose	16th													
Masha	Lose	17th														
Money added	800.000₽	600.000₽	500.000₽	700.000₽	900.000₽	1.000.000₽	700.000₽	800.000₽	1.000.000₽	900.000₽	600.000₽	700.000₽	700.000₽	500.000₽	900.000₽	11.300.000₽
Leader	Jeff	Asya	Margo	Aristarkh	Anna	Elena	Andrey	Anna	Aristarkh	Asya	Anna	Renat	Andrey	Asya	Renat	
Elimination challenge	Vadim	Aristarkh	Elena	Ekaterina	Asya	Anna	Jeff	Ekaterina	Andrey	Anna	Renat	Andrey	Asya	Renat	Renat	
Elimination challenge	Masha	Sergey	Marina	Margo	Albina	Yan	Vadim	Natalia	Jeff	Elena	Ramil	Aristarkh	Ekaterina	Andrey	Anna	Asya

== All-Stars ==
=== Continental Battle (2026) ===
Celebrity	Known for	Original position	Team	Exited	Finished
Aiza-Liluna Ai	Beauty salons owner	Season 1 (16th)	Red Team		
Alana Mamaeva	Model	Season 5 (4th)	Blue Team		
Alena Zhigalova	Interviewer	Season 5 (3rd)	Red Team		
Alexander Stepanov	Rapper	Season 3 (1st)	Red Team		
Anatoly Tsoy	MBAND singer	Season 2 (9th)	Green Team		
Anna Tsukanova-Kott	Silver Spoon actress	Season 6 (3rd)	Blue Team		
Aristarkh Venes	Cadetship actor	Season 6 (6th)	Red Team		
Evelina Bledans	Maski-show actress	Season 3 (16th)	Green Team		
Evgenia Iskandarova	Stand-Up comedienne	Season 4 (1st)	Green Team		
Karina Nigay	Fashion stylist	Season 4 (3rd)	Red Team		
Maria Pogrebnyak	Instagram blogger	Season 3 (3rd)	Blue Team		
Natan Mirov	Rapper	Season 5 (2nd)	Green Team		
Oleg Vereshchagin	Comedy Woman comedian	Season 2 (1st)	Red Team		
Oskar Kuchera	Radio personality	Season 4 (10th)	Blue Team		
Svetlana Permyakova	Interns actress	Season 1 (3rd)	Green Team		
Vadim Dubrovin	Zhuki actor	Season 6 (11th)	Green Team		
Vladimir Sychev	Fizruk actor	Season 2 (6th)	Blue Team		
Vyacheslav Malafeev	Football goalkeeper	Season 1 (1st)	Blue Team		

Celebrity	Episode 1	Episode 2	Episode 3	Episode 4	Episode 5	Episode 6	Episode 7	Episode 8	Episode 9	Episode 10	Episode 11	Episode 12	Episode 13	Episode 14	Episode 15
Aiza															
Alana															
Alena															
Alexander															
Anatoly															
Anna															
Aristarkh															
Evelina															
Evgenia															
Karina															
Maria															
Natan															
Oleg															
Oskar															
Svetlana															
Vadim															
Vladimir															
Vyacheslav															
Money added															
Leader															
Elimination challenge															
