= Roman Petrenko =

Russian businessman (born 1964)

- Рома́н Евге́ньевич Петре́нко
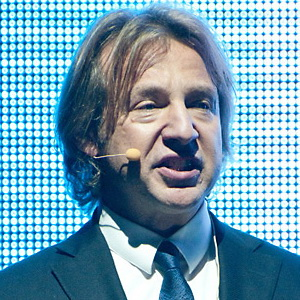
- Born: Roman Evgenievich Petrenko; October 24, 1964 (age 61); Murmansk, RSFSR, USSR (now Russia)
- Occupation: media manager
- Awards: Media Manager of Russia for the E-Media nomination (2002); Man of the year prize among the TV and Printed Issues (2002); Media Manager of Russia for the TV nomination (2004); Media Manager of Russia in a special nomination (2005); Prize winner of the National NAT Award in the category of 10 MEGA STARS (2005); Media-Manager of the Decade – the title given for the work as the President of TNT TV Station (2010); Awarded the Medal of Order of Merit for the Motherland, II degree. (2010)

Roman Evgenievich Petrenko (Russian: Рома́н Евге́ньевич Петре́нко; born 24 October 1964 in Murmansk, Soviet Union) is a Russian media executive; member of the Russian Television Academy; chief executive officer of Russian television broadcast networks STS (1998–2002) and TNT (2002–2013); co-founder Storyworld Entertainment, Santa Monica, California & Storyworld Entertainment WGA, Beverly Hills, California (2016–2018); former Head of TNT broadcast network and PREMIER (since October, 2018 up to February, 2022).

== Biography ==
1991 — Graduated from Kaliningrad Naval Engineering Academy, Kaliningrad, Russia.

1993 — Received an MBA from LETI School of Business, Saint Petersburg, Russia.

== Professional career ==
1992 — Sales manager for UNILEVER COMPANY, Saint Petersburg, Russia.

1993 — Marketing manager for MARS COMPANY, a transnational corporation.

1996 — Marketing manager for R. J. Reynolds Tobacco Company.

1996–1998 — Marketing Director for Russia and the territories of the Commonwealth of Independent States (former Soviet republics) for MARS Company Petfood Division. Created the "talking animals" advertising campaign for "Chappi" dog food, a model successfully adapted and implemented in 16 other countries.

1998–2002 — Named as CEO of television broadcast network STS. Revolutionized Russian television business by eliminating newscasts and implementing an exclusively entertainment-driven strategy aimed at younger audiences, transforming a formerlystate-subsidized ideological instrument into a profit-generating business enterprise.

Under his leadership, STS became the first television network in the country to turn profitable for its shareholders.

2002 — Named Chief Executive Officer of "TNT-Teleset", a small, low-rated network with limited regional coverage. Re-tooled TNT's programming, focusing on “reality TV” and light entertainment. Under his leadership, TNT becomes first Russian network to premiere new TV shows during summer hiatus months when other broadcasters traditionally aired only reruns. Implemented an aggressive advertising campaign to build TNT's brand awareness and gain market share, transformed network optics with stylized state-of-the-art graphics. Developed a new profit-oriented business model for TNT network.

2004 — Developed the original concept for Dom-2, a reality show which up to now is the longest-running program in the world and is one of the highest-rated and profitable shows in Russian television history.

2004–2005 — Guided development of original content for TNT, focusing on comedy (including sitcoms) and variety shows, leading to TNT achieving consistently high ratings, widening TNT's reach and appeal to the mass audience.

2005 — Happy Together (Shastlivy vmeste) (adapted from American hit sitcom Married... with Children) and Comedy Club (an original sketch-comedy/variety show) become national sensations; their successes cementing TNT's reputation as a leader in comedy and humor programming.

2006 — The Office, a reality show which lets the viewers witness first-hand all the trials and tribulations of creating a start-up commercial company from the ground up and at an accelerated pace.

2006 — Nasha Russia, a half-hour comedy show, goes on the air. The show's satire of Russian life makes it the most-quoted series in the country.

2010 — Interns (Interny), half-hour scripted comedy series begins its first season run, gathering up to 20% of the youth audience. Remarkably high ratings solidify TNT's position as leader in the most coveted 14- to 44-year-old audience demographic. TNT follows with a string of original comedy shows that were considered successful: Univer, SashaTanya, Girls (Deffchonki), The P.E. Teacher (Phizruk), The Real Dudes (Realniye Patsany), Olga, VIP Cop (Policeyskyy s Rublevki), Year of Culture (God Kultury), House Arrest (Domasniy Arest) and others.

2008 — Honored with the special Presidential appreciation award "for contribution to the development of domestic mass media and communications and in recognition of career achievements".

2011 — Launches NOW.ru the first internet pay-per-view streaming service in Russia offering a huge catalogue of foreign and domestic feature films, television shows and animation projects, signing agreements with Hollywood studios such as Sony Pictures and Walt Disney Pictures along with Warner TV (first-ever deal with a Russian internet resource portal), MTV Networks, BBC and Playboy Enterprises.

2012 — Leads TNT during its largest acquisition deal with company becoming co-owner of Comedy Club Productions, which will go on to become (and still is) a key content provider with shows like: Comedy Club, Comedy Woman, Nasha Russia, Interns, Univer, Stand Up, Open Mike (Otkrytiy Mikrofon), Dance (Tancy), The Improv (Improvizaciya) and Where's the Logic? (Gde Logika?).

2002–2013 — During his tenure as CEO, TNT's national audience share grows sharply from 2.5% to 13.4%, earning TNT the top spot in the 14 to 44 year old demographic and receiving multiple Russian Entertainment Awards as well as being honored by Promax/BDA European Awards and Worlds Design Awards.

2013–2014 — Named as Chairman of the Board of Directors for TNT Network.

2017 — Joined STORYWORLD ENTERTAINMENT together with Alexander Dulerayn to help expand TNT's international market reach by developing English-language content for a global audience.

2018 — Begins second tenure as head of TNT and named as executive in charge of content creation for PREMIER, Russia's leading online streaming platform.

2022 - He resigned from his positions as a CEO of TNT Network and a Managing director of GPM-RTV on Feb 8, 2022 and assumed a position of an advisor to CEO of Gazprom-Media. He resigned from his position as an advisor on February 28, 2022.

== Awards and public activity ==
- Elected member of the State Academy of TV and Radio-Broadcasting, 2001
- Named one of the best managers of the year according to the Kompania Magazine in the Service Sector, 2001
- Media Manager of Russia for the E-Media nomination, 2002
- Man of the year prize among the TV and Printed Issues, 2002
- Media Manager of Russia for the TV nomination, 2004
- Media Manager of Russia in a special nomination, 2005
- Prize winner of the National NAT Award in the category of 10 MEGA STARS, 2005
- Special honorary mention from the President of Russia For a major contribution in the development of national mass media and multi-year fruitful career, 2008
- Award from the Ministry for Sport, Tourism and Youth Policy of the Russian Federation for the Most Active Position on Information Support of the Year of the Youth Events, 2009
- Citation from the Ministry for Sport, Tourism and Youth Policy of the Russian Federation for a significant contribution in the development of physical education and sport, tourism, and the youth policy in the Russian Federation, 2009
- Media-Manager of the Decade — the title given for the work as the President of TNT TV Station, 2010
- For direct help provided by TNT TV Channel after the tragic events in Beslan, Roman Petrenko received a personal citation from the Head of the Government of the Republic of North Ossetia, 2004.
- Awarded the Medal of Order of Merit for the Motherland, II degree, 2010

== Projects ==
- Zapretnaya Zona (2003)
- Golod (2003)
- Dom (2003)
- Shkola remonta (2003)
- Sasha + Masha (2003)
- Dom-2 (2004)
- Taxi (2005)
- Bolshoy Brat (2005)
- Sex s Anfisoy Chekhovoy (2005)
- Comedy Club (2005)
- Rebyonok-robot (2006)
- Shastlivy vmeste (2006)
- Candidat (2006)
- Nyanya spechit na pomosh (2006)
- Office (2006)
- Goliye steny (2006)
- Obmen zhenami (2006)
- Drugaya zhizn (2006)
- Nastoyashiy muzhchina (2006)
- Nasha Russia (2006)
- Smeh bez pravil (2007)
- Uboynaya liga (2007)
- Klub byvshih zhen (2007)
- Bitva extrasensov (2007)
- Univer (2008)
- Samiy luchshiy film (2008)
- Lyubov na rayone (2008)
- Comedy Woman (2008)
- Barvikha (2009)
- Interny (2010)
- Realniye patsany (2010)
- Olga (2010)
- Phizruk (2010)
- Zaitsev+1 (2011)
- Deffchonki (2012)
- Moimi glazami (2013)
- KhB (2013)
- SashaTanya (2013)
- Bolshoy zavtrak (2018)
- God Kultury (2018)
- Policeiskiy s Rublevki 4 (2018)
- God svinyi (2018)
- Policeiskiy s Rublevki. Novogodniy bespredel (2019)
- Adaptatsiya 2 (2019)
- Realniye patsany. Noviy Seson (2019)
- Tolya-robot (2019)
- Sekta (2019)
