= Valentina Rubtsova =

Russian actress and singer (born 1977)

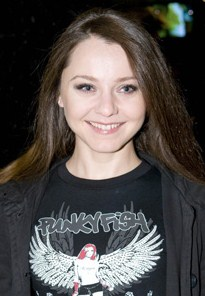
- Rubtsova in 2009
- Born: Valentina Pavlovna Rubtsova; 3 October 1977 (age 48); Makiivka, Ukrainian SSR, Soviet Union
- Occupations: Actress; Singer

Valentina Pavlovna Rubtsova (Note: Ukrainian: Валентина Павлівна Рубцова; Russian: Валентина Павловна Рубцова.) (born 3 October 1977) is a Ukrainian-born Russian actress and singer. She is best known for her role as Tanya Sergeeva (Arkhipova) in the TV series Univer, Univer. New Dorm, and SashaTanya.

== Biography ==
Rubtsova was born on 3 October 1977 in Makiivka. Since childhood, she dreamed of becoming an actress. In her youth, she participated in various theatrical productions and performances. From 1994 to 1996, she worked at the Donetsk Regional Theater for Young Spectators (Makiivka), performances: "Masquerade", "Two Maples". In 1996 she entered the Russian Institute of Theatre Arts for an acting course, which she graduated in 2001. It was here that she participated in the plays "The Naked King", "The Flea", "Both Laughter and Sin". While studying at GITIS from 1999 to 2003, Rubtsova was a soloist in the girl group Devochki. Her stint in this group lasted 4 years.

In 2003, Rubtsova began working in the musicals "12 Chairs" and “Cats”. Since 2004, she began appearing on television, first in the program "Thank God, you came!" on STS, also took part in the program "Saturday Night". After some time, she joined the cast of the TV series Univer. She found out about the casting for the series by chance, but showed herself successfully during the auditions, after which she was cast in the role of Tanya Arkhipova. This is Rubtsova's first work, which truly brought her fame. She would reprise her role as Tanya in the spinoff SashaTanya. She took part in the filming of the programs Big Difference on Channel One, and "The Investigation Was Conducted..." on NTV.

== Personal life ==
In 2009, after receiving Russian citizenship, Rubtsova married Arthur Martirosyan. On 1 December 2011, their daughter Sofia was born.
