= Andrey Gaydulyan =

Russian theater and film actor (born 1984)

- Андрей Гайдулян
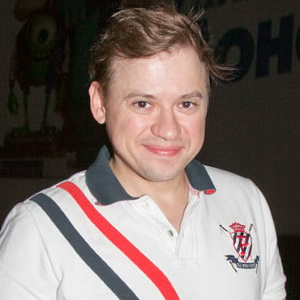
- Gaydulyan in 2013
- Born: 12 April 1984 (age 42); Kishinev, Moldavian SSR, Soviet Union
- Citizenship: Russia • Moldova

Andrey Sergeyevich Gaydulyan (guy-dool-ee-YAN, Russian: Андрей Сергеевич Гайдулян, Romanian: Andrei Gaydulean, born 12 April 1984) is a Moldovan-Russian theater and film actor. He is best known for the TV series Univer, Univer. New Dorm, and SashaTanya.

== Biography ==
Gaydulyan was born 12 April 1984 in Chișinău. His father Sergey Ivanovich Gaydulyan was a retired colonel of the Ministry of Internal Affairs while his mother was a teacher. His grandfather Ivan Vasilyevich Gaydulyan was a naval officer who was a participant in the Battle of Sevastopol.

He began to get involved in theater at school. He engaged in a theatrical circle at the Honored Artist of Moldova Sergey Tiranin, actor of the State Russian Drama Theater named after Chekhov.

In 2002, he entered the acting department of the Institute of Contemporary Art, from which he graduated in 2006. After graduation, while playing in the theater Glas, he began acting in small roles.

In 2007, he was selected for the lead role in the TV series, the sitcom University. The series brought the actor a lot of popularity and success. In 2013, he was the voice of the character Art in the Russian dubbing of the cartoon Monsters University.

On 24 July 2015, the actor was diagnosed with Hodgkin's lymphoma, after which he went to Germany for treatment.

== Selected filmography ==
=== Films ===
List of film credits
Year	Title	Role
2011	Full Contact	Vlad
2013	Friends of Friends	cameo
2018	Zomboyashchik	cameo
2021	#VShkole	Pimple's brother
2021	Red Prophecies	agent 3
2022	Self-Irony of Fate	Zhenya Lukashin

=== TV series ===
List of television credits
Year	Title	Role
2006	Kulagin and Partners	episode
2007	Law & Order: Division of Field Investigation	Laboratory assistant
2008 — 2011	Univer	Sasha Sergeev
2011 — 2014	Univer. New Dorm	Sasha Sergeev
2013 — present	SashaTanya	Sasha Sergeev
