= Alexander Nezlobin =

Russian stand-up comedian, actor, and television host

- Александр Васильевич Незлобин
- Born: Alexander Vasilyevich Nezlobin; July 30, 1983 (age 43); Polevskoy, Sverdlovsk Oblast, Russian SFSR, Soviet Union
- Occupations: Actor, television host, stand-up comedian, Film director, Screenwriter, producer, DJ
- Years active: 2000s–present
- Known for: Comedy Club, Nezlob
- Spouse: Alina Kruglova (m. 2012)
- Children: 1
- Website: nezlobin.com

Alexander Vasilyevich Nezlobin (Russian: Александр Васильевич Незлобин; born 30 July 1983 in Polevskoy, Sverdlovsk Oblast) is a Russian stand-up comedian, actor, television host, screenwriter, film director, and producer. He was a long-running resident of Comedy Club on TNT before moving to the United States in 2021.

== Early life and education ==
Nezlobin was born on 30 July 1983 in Polevskoy, Sverdlovsk Oblast. He attended School No. 13 in the Seversky district of the city. After finishing school, he enrolled in the economics faculty of the Ural State University of Economics in Yekaterinburg. While at university he began performing with the local KVN team, and soon joined the Yekaterinburg KVN all-star team Sverdlovsk.

== Career ==
=== Russian Federation ===
He started performing at the Yekaterinburg Comedy Club and was subsequently invited to Moscow. At Comedy Club he first performed as part of the duo Babochki (Butterflies) with Elvis (Igor Meerson), then as a solo act. Together with Elvis, he created the video segment Good Evening, Mars for Comedy Club. His stand-up material typically centers on male–female relationships. From 2009 he performed in clubs as DJ Nezlob. In 2010, he presented his stand-up show Let's Tell the Truth in Yekaterinburg, consisting of monologues, improvisation, and audience interaction.

The sitcom Nezlob, starring Alexander Nezlobin and loosely based on his life, premiered on TNT on 5 November 2013. The series had been three years in the making. The sitcom featured Nezlobin's mother, his real-life friends, former TNT CEO Roman Petrenko, TNT executive producer Alexander Dulerayn, Comedy Club Production founder Artur Janibekyan, TNT programming director Vladimir Voronov, and a number of celebrity guests.

Nezlobin wrote the screenplay for and played a role in the film Graduation (Выпускной), which premiered in October 2014.

In July 2018, Nezlobin left TNT, later explaining that he did so because he couldn’t fully realise his talent within Comedy Club. Nezlobin moved to STS, where he worked until the end of the 2020/2021 television season. He served as producer and host of the shows Thank God you came! (Слава Богу, ты пришел!) and Russians Don't Laugh (Русские не смеются), and created the late-night show Stand-Up Underground for the online service More.tv.

=== United States ===
In 2021, Nezlobin left Russia and settled in the United States with his family. While he initially cited a lack of professional prospects, later statements and interviews linked his departure to political circumstances, including his opposition to the Russian invasion of Ukraine. He stated that he left because he could not "remain safe and speak openly", describing disagreement with the actions of the Russian authorities as a decisive factor in his emigration.

His departure also occurred amid a broader tightening of restrictions on comedians in Russia, including high-profile cases related to jokes and public statements. Nezlobin had previously spoken out in support of stand-up comedian Idrak Mirzalizade, who was banned from residing in Russia following a controversial joke, criticising the decision as disproportionate.

Based in the United States, he has continued touring for Russian-speaking diaspora audiences. His US appearances have included venues such as the Kirkland Performance Center in Washington and the Improv comedy clubs. He has also performed in Europe, including a show at The Comedy Store in London in late 2022.

By 2024, Nezlobin was among a cohort of Russian comedians working on English-language material, aiming to reach audiences beyond the Russian-speaking world.

In January 2026, Nezlobin was featured in a new interview with Yuri Dud, where he spoke about his life and work in the United States. Nezlobin described the early period after relocation as marked by instability and uncertainty, stating that he had little sense of long-term prospects and struggled to understand how to sustain himself financially. He emphasised that stand-up became his primary means of adaptation, including writing new material based on personal experiences and performing it both in Russian and in English.

== Personal life ==
His wife is Alina Kruglova (born 1989), who was born and raised in Saint Petersburg. She graduated from a Saint Petersburg State Institute of Culture and has a younger sister, Yulia. She met her future husband in 2007 at a Saint Petersburg club.

In 2010, Kruglova moved to Moscow to be with Nezlobin. In 2012, they married secretly, away from the press. Their honeymoon was in the United States. Some time later, Nezlobin took his pregnant wife to Miami, where she gave birth to their daughter Linda.

== Filmography ==
Year	Title	Role	Notes
2011	Gnomeo & Juliet, Russian voiceover	Actor (voice)	Voice role
2013	Studio 17 (Студия 17)	Actor	Cameo
2013	Nezlob (Неzлоб)	Writer, Actor, Producer	Cameo
2014	Graduation (Выпускной)	Writer, Actor	Cameo
2016	The Groom (Жених)	Director, Writer	
2016	The Island (Остров) (Episode 5)	Actor	Cameo
2021	Love	Producer	
2021	I'm Not Joking (Я не шучу)	Producer	
2022	Doomsday (Конец Света)	Director	

=== Documentaries ===
- 2020 – Nezlobin: Sasha From Russia

=== Stand-up specials ===
- Half-baked concer... (Недоконцер...)
- Think like a millionaire (Думай как миллионер)
