= Nastasya Samburskaya =

Russian actress, singer and TV presenter (born 1987)

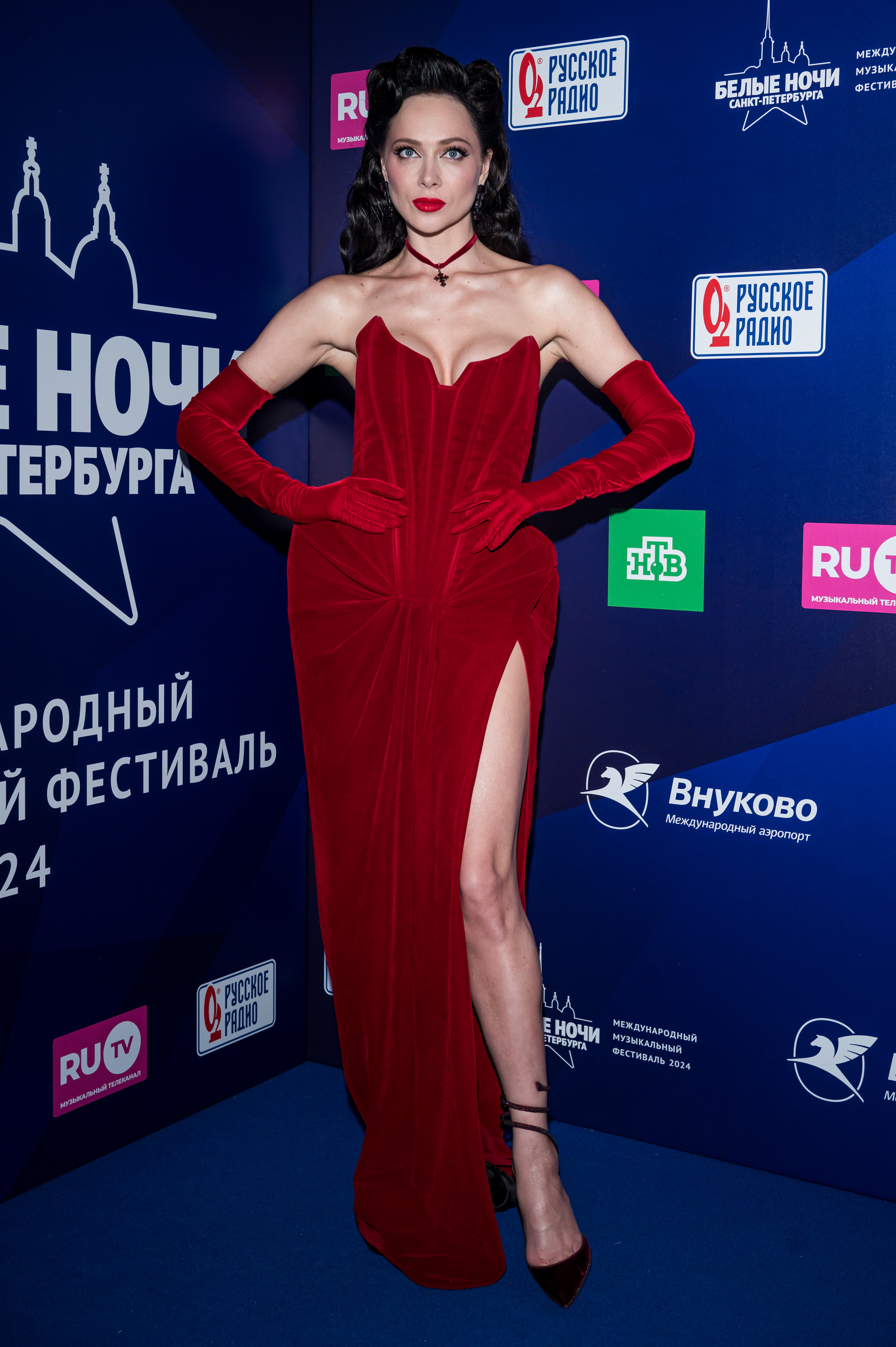
- Born: Nastasya Anislavovna Samburskaya; 1 March 1987 (age 39); Priozersk, Leningrad Oblast, RSFSR, USSR
- Occupations: Actress; singer; TV presenter
- Known for: "Univer"
- Musical career
- Genres: Pop-folk, folk-rock, classical crossover
- Years active: 2008–present

Nastasya Anislavovna Samburskaya (Russian: Настасья Аниславовна Самбурская; born 1 March 1987) is a Russian actress, folk-singer and TV presenter. Best known for her role as Kristina Sokolovskaya in comedy television series Univer.

== Biography ==
Nastasya Samburskaya was born in Priozersk, Leningrad Oblast, Russian SFSR, Soviet Union. After school Nastasya decided to first learn to be a stylist, hairdresser.

In 2010 she graduated from the Russian University of Theatre Arts - GITIS, workshop Sergey Golomazov, after which the group was invited to Malaya Bronnaya Theater, which serves as the moment.

The actress began her career in 2008. Since 2011, she has starred in the TV series Kristina Sokolovskaya Univer. New Dorm on TNT, playing a girl with a very complex character.

In 2016, she was in a relationship with Belarusian singer IVAN.

== Filmography ==
Year	Title	Role	Notes
2008	Wedding Ring	Natasha	TV series
2008	Univer	Kristina Sokolovskaya	3 season 53 series, Episode "Very Russian Detective", TNT
2009	Detectives	Anastasia, daughter of main character	TV series 344 "The last effort"
2009	Wild		TV series, Episode
2009	How to be Heart	Nurse	
2010	Bachelorette Party	Nastya, seller is in showroom	TV series
2011	Amazon	Anastasia, victim	TV series, Episode "The Case of suffocation"
2011-2014	Univer. New Dorm	Kristina Sokolovskaya, student	TV series, TNT
2012	Swallow's Nest	Lena	TV series, Episode
2012	Ahead of the Shot	Olga	TV series
2013	The First Autumn of the War	Nina	
2013	SashaTanya	Kristina Sokolovskaya	TV series, TNT
2014	Give My Love	Ilona Orlova	
2015	Women Vs Men	Zlata	
2016	Friday	Lara	
