= Darya Sagalova =

Russian actress and choreographer

- Born: Darya Dmitrievna Sagalova; December 14, 1985 (age 40); Podolsk, Moscow Oblast, Russian SFSR, Soviet Union
- Occupations: Actress, choreographer
- Years active: 2003–present
- Spouse(s): Konstantin Maslennikov (m.2011–present; 3 children)
- Children: 3
- Website: Official website

Darya Dmitrievna Sagalova (Russian: Да́рья Дми́триевна Сага́лова; born December 14, 1985) is a Russian film and stage actress, and choreographer.

== Career ==
Sagalova has appeared in theatrical productions and films since 2003. She is best known for her role as Sveta Bukina from the TV series Happy Together (Russian: Счастливы вместе) - an adaptation of the American TV series Married... with Children.

== Personal life ==
On January 21, 2011, Sagalova married police officer Konstantin Maslennikov. They have three children.

In February 2011, it became known that the couple were expecting their first child, who was born on July 1, 2011. Their child was named Elizaveta. Sagalova gave birth again on July 31, 2015, to a girl named Stefania. On April 1, 2019, Sagalova gave birth to a third child - a boy.

== Filmography ==
Year	Title	Role	Notes
2005	Dreaming is Not Harmful	Marina	
2005	Loneliness of Love	Rimma	
2006-2013	Happy Together	Sveta Bukina	TV series
2007	Night Nurses	hospital attendant	
2008	I Will Never Forget You	Marina	
2008-2011	Univer	Sasha Sergeeva	TV series
2011	Yeralash	bookstore salesperson	TV series
2014	Friends of Friends	Police Officer (episode)	(ru)
2018	Flying Crew	flight attendant Nastya Kasatkina	TV series
