= The Groom =

- Directed by: Alexander Nezlobin
- Written by: Alexander Nezlobin; Sergei Svetlakov
- Produced by: Sergei Svetlakov; Polina Arustamova; Alexander Prokudin; Valery Fyodorovich; Evgeny Nikishov; Alexander Dulerayn; Igor Mishin
- Starring: Sergei Svetlakov; Mikhail Galustyan; Valeriy Matdash; Viktor Verzhbitsky
- Music by: Anton Silaev
- Production companies: Karoprokat; Solaris Promo Production; TNT
- Release date: 15 September 2016
- Running time: 90 minutes
- Country: Russia
- Language: Russian
- Budget: $1,500,000
- Box office: $8,294,260

The Groom (Russian: Жених, romanized: Zhenikh) is a 2016 Russian comedy film, directorial debut of Alexander Nezlobin.

== Plot ==
A German named Helmut, having fallen in love with a Russian girl named Alena, whom he met in Berlin, arrives in Russia on Victory Day (9 May) to ask for her hand in marriage. Having welcomed the groom, Alena goes to the village to introduce him to her relatives. But at this time Tolya - her ex-husband, is visiting the village, who suddenly decided to get his wife back.

Serious rivalry awakes when the ex-husband is introduced to the new groom. All friends, relatives, residents of the neighboring village, businessman Erofeev, who bought the house next door, and even a tankman with a snake - all are involved in the family affair.

== Cast ==
- Sergei Svetlakov - Tolya
- Olga Kartunkova - Lyuba
- Sergey Burunov - Erofeev
- George Dronov - Lyapichev
- Alexander Demidov - Pokuchaev
- Philippe Reinhardt - Helmut
- Svetlana Smirnova-Martsinkevich - Alena
- Dmitry Nikulin - Lyoshka
- Natalia Parshenkova - Balasha
- Magomed Murtazaliev - Maga
- Mahmoud Huseynov - Maga's brother
- Timothy Zaitsev - tanker
- Yan Tsapnik - policeman
- Roman Madyanov - General
- Grigory Bagrov - border guard
- Lisa Izmaylova is a girl
- Albina Evtushevskaya - grandmother No. 1
- Violetta Beketova - grandmother № 2

== Sequel ==
A sequel has been announced, titled The Groom 2: To Berlin!.
