= Karina Kross =

Russian vlogger & singer (born 1992)

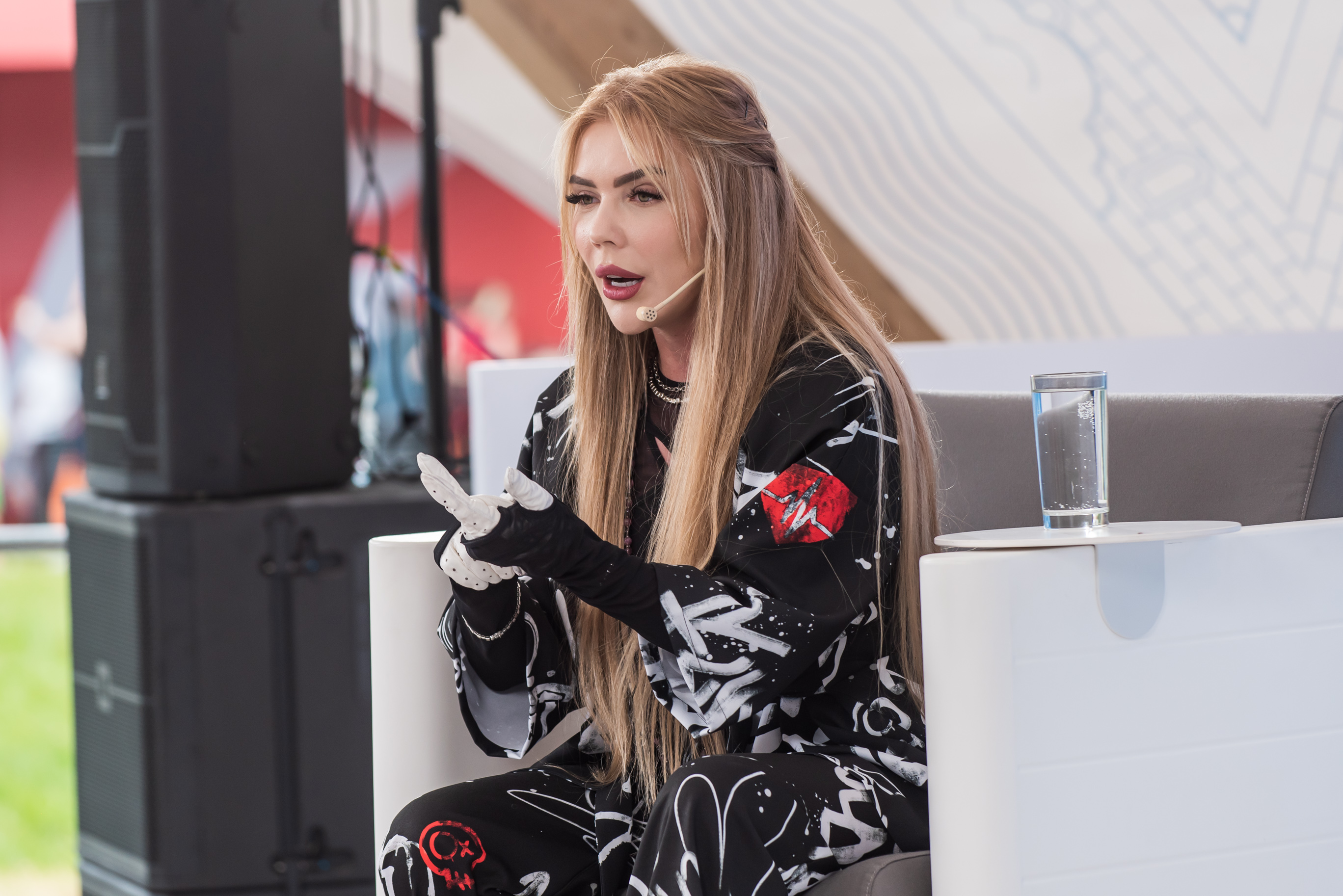

Background information
- Born: Karina Vadimovna Lazaryants; October 25, 1992 (age 33); Moscow, Russia
- Genres: Pop
- Occupations: Vlogger; singer; actress; tv presenter
- Years active: 2012–present
- Label: Atlantic Records

Karina Vadimovna Lazaryants (Russian: Карина Вадимовна Лазарьянц (born. 25 October 1992, Moscow), better known under the pseudonyms Karina Kross (Russian: Кари́на Кросс) & Kara Kross is a Russian Vlogger, TV presenter, singer, and actress, as well as the founder of her company Kross Cosmetic.

== Biography ==
Karina Kross was born on 25 October 1992 in Moscow to an Armenian Jewish family. Her parents are Vadim Lazaryants and Ekaterina Galdina. Her father is Armenian, a jurist and entrepreneur, while her mom is Jewish and an equestrian coach.

In 2017, Lazaryants (already under the name Karina Kross) took part in the cooking show «Званый ужин» on REN TV.

In 2020, Karina hosted on «YouTube» here own teen comedy serial called «Бездатая жизнь».

In February 2022, she became a member of the second season of the show «Celebrities in Africa» on TNT.

== Discography ==
=== Albums ===
| Title | Information |
|---|---|
| «Чёртово колесо-EP» | Release: 7 April 2023; Label: VK Records; Format: digital distribution |

| Year | Title | Charts | | | Notes |
| Year | Title | CIS | | | Notes |
| Year | Title | TopHit Top Radio & YouTube Hits | TopHit Top Radio Hits | TopHit Top YouTube Hits | Notes |
|---|---|---|---|---|---|
| 2018 | «Внутри» (DAVA & KROSS) | | | | digital single, 4 Dec. 2018 |
| 2019 | «BOOOM» (DAVA feat. KARA KROSS) | | | | digital single, 16 Jan. 2019 |
| 2019 | «Самого самого» | | | | digital single, 11 Feb 2019 |
| 2019 | «Холодный кипяток» | | | | digital single, 14 May 2019 |
| 2019 | «Не враг» | | | | digital single, 16 July 2019 |
| 2019 | «Блогинг» | | | | digital single, 22 Nov. 2019 |
| 2019 | «ТикиТок» | | | | digital single, 17 Dec. 2019 |
| 2019 | «Тики Ток» (SkazkaMusic Remix) | | | | digital single, 29 Dec. 2019 |
| 2020 | «Country Dancer» | | | | digital single, 9 Jun 2020 |
| 2020 | «Не смогу» (VERBEE & KARA KROSS) | 82 | 103 | 60 | digital single, 10 Aug. 2020 |
| 2020 | «Поколение» | | | 26 | digital single, 1 Dec. 2020 |
| 2020 | «Kross Cosmetic» | | | | digital single, 19 Dec. 2020 |
| 2021 | «Просто Друг» | | | | digital single, 10 Feb. 2021 |
| 2021 | «Тусы» | | | | digital single, 10 Feb. 2021 |
| 2021 | «Время утекай» (KARA KROSS & Mumiy Troll) | | | | digital single, 30 Jul. 2021 |
| 2022 | «Пора повзрослеть» | | | | digital single, 17 Jun. 2022 |
| 2023 | «Истерика» | | | | digital single, 24 Mar. 2023 |
| 2023 | «Апатия» | | | | digital single, 31 Mar. 2023 |
| 2023 | «Чёртово Колесо» (KARA KROSS & MANIIL) (Phonk Club Remix) | | | | digital single, 28 Apr. 2023 |

==== Music videos featuring Karina Kross ====
- Anna Boronina — «Васаби» & «Королева караоке»;
- Loboda feat. Pharaoh — «Boom Boom»;
- Olga Buzova — «Заплачу»;
- Klava Koka — «Замуж»;

== Awards and nominations ==
| Year | Award | Category | Nominee | Results | Ref. |
|---|---|---|---|---|---|
| 2019 | Best Blogger Awards | Funniest Blog | Karina Lazaryants | Won | |
| 2020 | Zhara Music Awards | Blogger of the year | Karina Kross | Won | |

== Ratings ==
- Most popular Russian TikToker – 6th place.
