= Married... with Children =

American television sitcom (1987–1997)

- Genre: Sitcom; Surreal humour; Satire
- Created by: Michael G. Moye; Ron Leavitt
- Showrunners: Ron Leavitt (seasons 1–7); Michael G. Moye (seasons 1–6; 8–9); Richard Gurman; Kim Weiskopf (both; season 10); Pamela Eells (season 11)
- Starring: Ed O'Neill; Katey Sagal; David Garrison; Amanda Bearse; Christina Applegate; David Faustino; Ted McGinley
- Theme music composer: Sammy Cahn; Jimmy Van Heusen
- Opening theme: "Love and Marriage" by Frank Sinatra
- Ending theme: "Love and Marriage" (instrumental)
- Composer: Jonathan Wolff
- Country of origin: United States
- Original language: English
- No. of seasons: 11
- No. of episodes: 259 (list of episodes)

Production
- Executive producers: Ron Leavitt; Michael G. Moye; Katherine Green; Richard Gurman; Kim Weiskopf; Pamela Eells
- Producers: Barbara Blachut Cramer; John Maxwell Anderson
- Camera setup: Videotape; Multi-camera
- Running time: 22–23 minutes
- Production companies: Embassy Communications; Columbia Pictures Television

Original release
- Network: Fox
- Release: April 5, 1987 – June 9, 1997

Related
- Top of the Heap; Vinnie & Bobby

Married... with Children is an American television sitcom created by Michael G. Moye and Ron Leavitt for the Fox Broadcasting Company, broadcast from April 5, 1987, to June 9, 1997. It is the longest-running live-action sitcom ever aired on Fox. Married... with Children was the first primetime series broadcast on the new Fox network and Fox's second series overall (after The Late Show Starring Joan Rivers debuted in 1986). The series' run ended with the episode broadcast on May 5, 1997. Two previously unaired episodes were broadcast on June 9, 1997, and June 18, 2002.

The show is set in Chicago and follows the lives of Al Bundy, a former high school football player turned hard-luck women's shoe salesman, his lazy wife Peggy, their lazy daughter Kelly, and their lazy son Bud. The show also features their neighbors Steve and Marcy Rhoades, both of whom Al finds annoying, and who feel the same way about him. Later in the series, Marcy marries Jefferson D'Arcy, a white-collar criminal and former CIA agent who becomes her "trophy husband" and Al's best friend.

The series is one of the longest-running sitcoms in American television history, covering 11 seasons with 259 episodes in its run. Its theme song is "Love and Marriage" by Sammy Cahn and Jimmy Van Heusen, performed by Frank Sinatra. Critical reception was mixed during its original run, and the show's sexually charged humor and depiction of a dysfunctional family were in stark contrast to family sitcoms of the era.

The first two seasons were videotaped in front of a studio audience at ABC Television Center in the Los Feliz section of Los Angeles, with seasons 3 through 8 recorded at Sunset Gower Studios in Hollywood, and seasons 9 through 11 at Sony Pictures Studios in Culver City. The series was a production of Columbia Pictures Television for FOX, through Embassy Communications for Season 1 and ELP Communications for Seasons 2–11.

In 2008, the show made the top 100 on Entertainment Weekly's "New TV Classics" list, placing number 94.

== Cast and characters ==
Actor	Role	Years	Seasons	Appearances
Ed O'Neill	Al Bundy	1987–1997	1–11	259
Katey Sagal	Margaret "Peggy" Bundy	1987–1997	1–11	247
Christina Applegate	Kelly Bundy	1987–1997	1–11	256
David Faustino	Bud Bundy	1987–1997	1–11	257
Amanda Bearse	Marcy Rhoades/D'Arcy	1987–1997	1–11	236
David Garrison	Steve Rhoades	1987–1990, 1992–93, 1995	1–4, guest 6–7, 9	73
Ted McGinley	Jefferson D'Arcy	1989, 1991–97	Guest 4, main 5–11	166

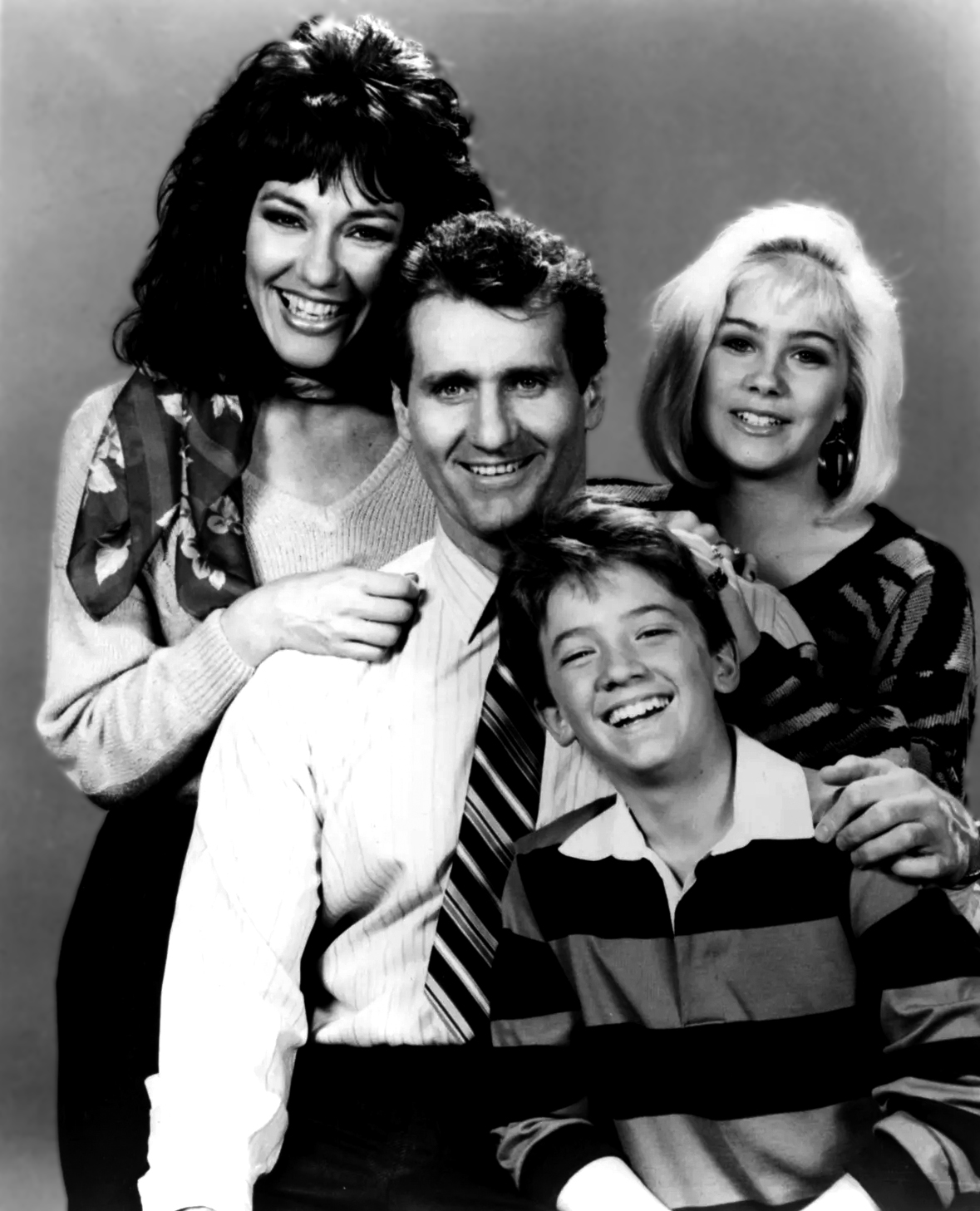
- The cast of Married... with Children in 1987. (L–R): Katey Sagal, Ed O'Neill, David Faustino and Christina Applegate.
  Alphonse "Al" Bundy (Ed O'Neill) – A misanthrope, afflicted by the so-called "Bundy curse" that consigns him to an unrewarding career selling women's shoes and a life with a family that mocks and disrespects him, who still enjoys the simple things in life. He constantly attempts to relive his high-school football days, when he was an "All State Fullback". His most noted achievement was having scored four touchdowns in a single game for Polk High. His favorite things in life are the local nudie bar, his collection of BigUns magazine, his 1972 Dodge Dart with more than 1 million mi (1.6 million km) on the odometer, and a television show called Psycho Dad. Despite his family's antipathy for him, and his for them, Al is always ready to defend his family and the Bundy honor.
- Margaret "Peggy" Bundy (née Wanker) (Katey Sagal) – Al's wife who is always pestering him about money and refuses to do any housework or get a job. Peggy is a lazy redhead who spends most of her time watching talk shows such as Oprah or stealing Al's limited funds to go shopping; she frequently mocks Al about his unglamorous job, his meager earnings, his hygiene, and his poor sexual abilities. Her careless spending on things like clothes and male strip clubs has run Al into debt on numerous occasions. A recurring joke in the series is Al's and Peggy's regrets of having married each other, although on occasion they will show affection towards one another. Peggy's best friend is Marcy, with whom Peggy occasionally heads into trouble. Peggy's side of the family is a backwoods clan of hillbillies whom she often forces the other Bundys to endure, especially her morbidly obese mother, whom Al finds intolerable.
- Kelly Bundy (Christina Applegate) – the Bundys' firstborn; a dumb blonde who is often derided as promiscuous and dates guys who irritate Al to the point that he wants to physically assault them. Her stupidity manifests in many ways, from forgetting ideas on the spot to mispronouncing or misspelling simple words. She and her brother Bud generally get along, but enjoy belittling one another.
- Budrick "Bud" Franklin Bundy (David Faustino) – the younger Bundy offspring, and sometimes the more level-headed family member, although his preoccupation with sex sometimes leads to inevitable failures with women. He and older sister Kelly constantly taunt each other, but when Kelly is in a legitimate bind he will support her, much like Kelly does for him under similar circumstances.
- Marcy Rhoades, later Marcy D'Arcy (Amanda Bearse) – the Bundys' next-door neighbor, Al's nemesis and Peggy's best friend; an educated banker, but also a feminist and environmentalist who often protests Al's schemes with his NO MA'AM (National Organization of Men Against Amazonian Masterhood) group. Marcy is the founder and leader of an anti-man support group called "FANG" (Feminists Against Neanderthal Guys). Marcy and Al constantly bicker and do not get along. For the first few seasons of the show, Marcy is married to Steve Rhoades. After Marcy and Steve divorce and he leaves during the fourth season, Marcy meets and marries Jefferson D'Arcy, giving her the name Marcy D'Arcy.
- Steven "Steve" Bartholomew Rhoades (David Garrison) is Marcy's first husband, a stuffy banker who finds himself frequently entangled in Al's schemes. Steve's most prized possession is his Mercedes-Benz, which he does not even let Marcy drive. Although very much in love at the beginning of the series, Steve and Marcy grow apart and he leaves her during the fourth season to become a forest ranger at Yosemite National Park. He later comes back in "The Egg and I" episode to try and reclaim his old life with Marcy, but finds trouble with Jefferson, Marcy's second husband. Steve later has another job as the dean of Bud's college, after blackmailing the previous one he worked under as a chauffeur.
- Jefferson Milhouse D'Arcy (Ted McGinley), a pretty-boy scammer to whom Marcy wakes up one morning and discovers she has married. Unlike Steve, Jefferson is more of a free spirit, likes to have fun, is constantly unemployed, has no money of his own, and uses Marcy for financial purposes. Marcy is aware of this, but whenever Jefferson gets into trouble with her, he distracts her by working his charm and resorting to sexual bartering. In several episodes, Jefferson is implied, but never confirmed, to have had a past life as a former spy/CIA operative.

=== Pilot episode ===
In the show's pilot episode, actors Tina Caspary and Hunter Carson played the roles of Kelly and Bud Bundy, respectively. Before the series aired publicly, the roles for the two Bundy children were re-cast. Ed O'Neill and the show's producers worried about a lack of chemistry with the parents and the original actors cast as the children. The roles were re-cast and all of the scenes in the pilot with Carson and Caspary were re-shot with David Faustino and Christina Applegate playing Bud and Kelly Bundy.

== Development ==
The working title of Married... with Children was Not the Cosbys, as a mockery of family sitcoms that were common on primetime television in the mid-1980s such as The Cosby Show. Creators Ron Leavitt and Michael G. Moye were told by Garth Ancier and other Fox executives "to be as outrageous as they could be, doing the sort of material the Big Three would never allow on the air", wrote Daniel M. Kimmel in 2004. However, Fox CEO Barry Diller had initial doubts that Married... with Children would be successful.

During the show's development Christina Applegate had turned down the role of Kelly, so in the show's pilot episode, Tina Caspary played the role. When that didn't work out, the producers asked Applegate again.

During the show's first season, 15-year-old Applegate was paid $20,000 per episode.

== Reception ==
=== Critical response ===
For season 1, Metacritic calculated an average of 58 out of 100 based on 5 reviews, indicating "mixed or average reviews". Reviews of the debut episode were mixed. In 1987, Howard Rosenberg of the Los Angeles Times praised the casting of the Bundys, found the character development of the Rhoades lacking, and warned viewers: "The satire is heavy-handed." Conversely, also in 1987, Tom Shales of The Washington Post called the debut episode "nasty-minded, overacted and poorly cast". For The New York Times, John J. O'Connor described it as "loud, coarse and life-of-the-party vulgar". O'Connor also compared Married... unfavorably to other family shows like The Life of Riley and All in the Family, describing the show as "pure blue-collar shtick, dressed up with the usual sexual-potency and bathroom jokes".

=== Ratings ===
Despite the show's enduring popularity and fanbase, Married... with Children was never a major ratings success. Part of the reason was that Fox, a startup network, did not have the affiliate base of the Big Three television networks, thus preventing the series from reaching the entire country. In an interview for a special commemorating the series' 20-year anniversary in 2007, Katey Sagal stated that part of the problem the series faced was that many areas of the country were able to get Fox only through low-quality UHF channels well into the early 1990s, while some areas of the country did not receive the new network at all, a problem not largely rectified until the launch of Foxnet in June 1991 and later the network's acquisition of National Football League rights which led to several stations across the United States changing affiliations. For instance, Ed O'Neill's hometown of Youngstown, Ohio did not have its own Fox affiliate until CBS affiliate WKBN-TV signed on WFXI-CA/WYFX-LP in 1998, one year after the show went off the air (the area was served by WPGH-TV in Pittsburgh and Cleveland's Fox affiliates—initially WOIO, then WJW—as default affiliates on cable), so many of O'Neill's friends and family mistakenly thought he was famous for beer commercials during this time.

Another problem lay in the fact that many of the newly developed series on Fox were unsuccessful, which kept the network from building a popular lineup to draw in a larger audience. In its original airing debut, Married... with Children was part of a Sunday lineup that competed with the popular Murder, She Wrote and Sunday-night movie on CBS. Fellow freshman series included Duet, cancelled in 1989, along with It's Garry Shandling's Show and The Tracey Ullman Show, both of which were canceled in 1990. The success of The Simpsons, which debuted on The Tracey Ullman Show in 1987, helped draw some viewers over to Fox, allowing Married... with Children to rank in the Nielsen Top 50 from Season 4 through Season 8, peaking at No. 37 in Season 6. Although these ratings were somewhat small in comparison with the other three networks, they were nonetheless more than good enough for Fox to keep renewing the show. In its prime in the early 1990s, the show was averaging more than 20 million viewers every week.

While the series did not end on a cliffhanger, it was expected to be renewed for a 12th season (which would have been the final season) and thus did not have a proper series finale when Fox decided to cancel it in 1997. With Fox announcing the cancellation publicly before informing the cast and crew, most if not all of them found out about the series cancellation from fans and low-level employees instead of from network executives. Katey Sagal stated that she constantly felt that the series was neglected by Fox despite helping bring the fledgling network on the map (Married... with Children having been on even before The Simpsons); for his part, Ed O'Neill attributed possible neglect of the series by Fox to constant turnover of some of the top positions at the network. In a 2013 interview, O'Neill stated that he felt that TV stations that owned syndication rights to the series put pressure on Fox and Sony Pictures Television to end it since it had nearly three times the episodes needed for syndication and the production of more episodes would have resulted in higher rights fees.

Ratings overview
Season	Episodes	Timeslot (EDT)	Premiere	Finale	TV season	Rank	Rating
1	13	Sunday 8:00 PM	April 5, 1987	June 28, 1987	1986–87	#142	–
2	22	Sunday 8:00 PM (September 27 – October 18, 1987); Sunday 8:30 PM (October 25, 1987 – May 1, 1988)	September 27, 1987	May 1, 1988	1987–88	#115	4.7
3	22	Sunday 8:30 PM	November 6, 1988	May 21, 1989	1988–89	#63	10.5
4	23	Sunday 9:00 PM	September 3, 1989	May 13, 1990	1989–90	#41	12.9
5	25	Sunday 9:00 PM	September 23, 1990	May 19, 1991	1990–91	#41	12.4
6	26	Sunday 9:00 PM	September 8, 1991	May 17, 1992	1991–92	#37	12.5
7	26	Sunday 9:00 PM	September 13, 1992	May 23, 1993	1992–93	#43	11.4
8	26	Sunday 9:00 PM	September 5, 1993	May 22, 1994	1993–94	#46	10.8
9	26	Sunday 9:00 PM	September 4, 1994	May 21, 1995	1994–95	#66	9.5
10	26	Sunday 9:00 PM	September 17, 1995	May 19, 1996	1995–96	#78	8.2
11	24	Saturday 9:00 PM (September 28 – October 12, 1996); Sunday 7:30 PM (November 10 – December 29, 1996); Monday 9:30 PM (January 6–27, 1997); Monday 9:00 PM (February 24 – June 9, 1997)	September 28, 1996	June 9, 1997	1996–97	#97	6.7

=== Controversy and legacy ===
The sexual humor and depiction of family life on Married... with Children were controversial from its debut. Daniel M. Kimmel reflected on the show in 2004: "It had achieved a cult status as a somewhat tasteless family sitcom that was so well written and acted that some actually saw it as dark satire of modern suburban life rather than simply an unending stream of sex jokes." In 2007, Time TV critic James Poniewozik, in ranking the show among the 100 greatest of all time, called it "a twisted mirror of TV's instant-gratification culture...suitable for a medieval morality play." Poniewozik concluded about the characterization of the show: "Zestily lowbrow and sex-obsessed, Married was dedicated to the classical ideal that unhappy families were more interesting than happy ones... and a lot funnier." Reviewing Sony's original DVD release of the first season in 2003, Aaron Belerle of DVD Talk reflected that the show's humor "doesn't seem so edgy anymore".

In 1989, Terry Rakolta from Bloomfield Hills, Michigan, attempted to lead a boycott of the show after viewing the episode "Her Cups Runneth Over". Offended by the images of an old man wearing a woman's garter and stockings, the scene in which Steve touches the pasties of a mannequin dressed in S&M gear, a homosexual man wearing a tiara on his head (and Al's line "...and they wonder why we call them 'queens'"), and a half-nude woman who takes off her bra in front of Al (and is shown with her arms covering her bare chest in the next shot), Rakolta began a letter-writing campaign to advertisers, demanding they boycott the show.

Rakolta's campaign resulted in Gillette, Warner–Lambert, and Coca-Cola ending sponsorships; ironically, Coca-Cola owned the studio that produced the show, Columbia Pictures Television. Fox pulled the episode titled "I'll See You in Court" (in which the Bundys attempt to improve their love life by having marital relations in a different setting). This episode became known as the "Lost Episode" and was aired on FX on June 18, 2002, with some parts cut. The episode was packaged with the rest of the third season in the January 2005 DVD release (and in the first volume of the Married... with Children Most Outrageous Episodes DVD set) with the parts cut from syndication restored.

Viewers' curiosity over the boycott and over the show itself led to a dramatic ratings boost. Rakolta has been alluded to twice on the show: "Rock and Roll Girl", in which a newscaster mentions the city Bloomfield Hills, and "No Pot to Pease In", in which a television show is made about the Bundy family and then cancelled because, as Marcy stated, "some woman in Michigan didn't like it."

Socially conservative criticisms of the show were not limited to Rakolta. The Media Research Center named Married... with Children the worst show of the 1995–96 television season, calling it the "crudest comedy on prime time television" for "lewd punch lines". Republican U.S. Senator Jesse Helms called the show "trash". Fellow Senator Joe Lieberman (D-CT) also strongly criticized the sitcom, after having walked in on his stepson and young daughter watching an episode one evening in late 1993. In an interview many years later, Lieberman would specifically cite Married...With Children as the impetus for his becoming a vocal opponent of pop culture and the entertainment industry throughout his Senate career.

However, the show was recognized for giving women prominent roles behind the scenes. Producers decided to rewrite the sixth season storyline of Peggy's pregnancy, which coincided with Sagal's actual pregnancy, as a dream that Al had. This was done to prevent Sagal from suffering further trauma by having her character Peggy interact with a new baby, when Sagal's pregnancy ended with her going into premature labor and the baby being stillborn.

Amanda Bearse (Marcy B. Rhoades/D'Arcy) also became one of the first mainstream actresses to publicly come out as a lesbian, which she did during the series run; she received positive recognition for doing so.

On April 22, 2012, Fox re-aired the series premiere in commemoration of its 25th anniversary.

=== Accolades ===
Award	Year	Category	Nominee(s)	Result	Ref.
ASCAP Film and Television Music Awards	1995	Top TV Series	Jonathan Wolff	Won	
ASCAP Film and Television Music Awards	1996	Top TV Series	Jonathan Wolff	Won	
Casting Society	1987	Best Casting for TV – Comedy Episodic	Marc Hirschfeld	Nominated	
Golden Globe Awards	1991	Best Television Series – Comedy or Musical	Married... with Children	Nominated	
Golden Globe Awards	1991	Best Actress in a Television Series – Comedy or Musical	Katey Sagal	Nominated	
Golden Globe Awards	1992	Best Actor in a Television Series – Comedy or Musical	Ed O'Neill	Nominated	
Golden Globe Awards	1992	Best Actress in a Television Series – Comedy or Musical	Katey Sagal	Nominated	
Golden Globe Awards	1993	Best Actor in a Television Series – Comedy or Musical	Ed O'Neill	Nominated	
Golden Globe Awards	1993	Best Actress in a Television Series – Comedy or Musical	Katey Sagal	Nominated	
Golden Globe Awards	1994	Best Actress in a Television Series – Comedy or Musical	Katey Sagal	Nominated	
Kids' Choice Awards	1993	Favorite TV Actress	Christina Applegate	Nominated	
Kids' Choice Awards	1995	Favorite Animal Star	Buck	Nominated	
Primetime Emmy Awards	1987	Outstanding Lighting Direction (Electronic) for a Series	Mark Buxbaum (for "But I Didn't Shoot the Deputy")	Nominated	
Primetime Emmy Awards	1988	Outstanding Lighting Direction (Electronic) for a Series	Ted Polmanski (for "Girls Just Wanna Have Fun")	Nominated	
Primetime Emmy Awards	1989	Outstanding Editing for a Series - Multi-Camera Production	Larry Harris (for "Requiem For A Dead Barber")	Nominated	
Primetime Emmy Awards	1990	Outstanding Costuming for a Series	Marti M. Squyres (for "Raingirl")	Nominated	
Primetime Emmy Awards	1990	Outstanding Editing for a Series - Multi-Camera Production	Larry Harris (for "Who'll Stop The Rain")	Nominated	
Primetime Emmy Awards	1991	Outstanding Achievement in Costuming for a Series	Marti M. Squyres (for "Married...With Aliens")	Nominated	
Primetime Emmy Awards	1994	Outstanding Individual Achievement in Costuming for a Series	Marti M. Squyres (for "Take My Wife, Please")	Nominated	
TV Guide Awards	1993	Favorite TV Pet	"Buck" The Dog	Nominated	
Young Artist Awards	1988	The Most Promising New Fall TV Series		Nominated	
Young Artist Awards	1988	Best Young Actor Starring in a New TV Comedy Series	David Faustino	Nominated	
Young Artist Awards	1988	Best Young Actress Starring in a New TV Comedy Series	Christina Applegate	Nominated	
Young Artist Awards	1989	Best Young Actress – TV Comedy Series	Christina Applegate	Won	
Young Artist Awards	1989	Best Young Actor – TV Comedy Series	David Faustino	Nominated	
Young Artist Awards	1990	Best Young Actor – TV Series	David Faustino	Nominated	
Young Artist Awards	1991	Outstanding Young Comedian in a TV Series	David Faustino	Nominated	
Young Artist Awards	1992	Outstanding Young Comedian in a TV Series	David Faustino	Nominated	
Young Artist Awards	1993	Outstanding Young Comedian in a TV Series	David Faustino	Nominated	
Young Artist Awards	1993	Outstanding Actor Under Ten in a TV Series	Shane Sweet	Nominated	
Young Artist Awards	1994	Best Actor Under Ten in a TV Series or Show	Shane Sweet	Nominated	
Young Artist Awards	1997	Best Performance in a TV Comedy – Guest Starring Young Performer	Miles Marsico	Nominated	

== Episodes ==
Season	Episodes	Originally released	
Season	Episodes	First released	Last released
1	13	April 5, 1987	June 28, 1987
2	22	September 27, 1987	May 1, 1988
3	22	November 6, 1988	May 21, 1989
4	23	September 3, 1989	May 13, 1990
5	25	September 23, 1990	May 19, 1991
6	26	September 8, 1991	May 17, 1992
7	26	September 13, 1992	May 23, 1993
8	26	September 5, 1993	May 22, 1994
9	26	September 4, 1994	May 21, 1995
10	26	September 17, 1995	May 19, 1996
11	24	September 28, 1996	June 9, 1997

During its 11-season run on the Fox network, Married... with Children aired 258 episodes. A 259th episode, "I'll See You in Court" from season 3, never aired on Fox, but premiered on FX and has since been included on DVD and in syndication packages. Three specials also aired following the series' cancellation, including a cast reunion.

== Home media ==
Sony Pictures Home Entertainment has released all 11 seasons of Married... with Children on DVD in Regions 1, 2, and 4. On December 12, 2010, Sony released a complete series set on DVD in Region 1.

In December 2007, the Big Bundy Box—a special collection box with all seasons plus new interviews with Sagal and David Faustino—was released. This boxset was released in Australia (Region 4) on November 23, 2009.

The Sony DVD box sets from season 3 onward do not feature the original "Love and Marriage" theme song in the opening sequence because Sony was unable to obtain the licensing rights to the song for later sets. Despite this, the end credits on the DVDs for season 3 still include a credit for "Love and Marriage."

On August 27, 2013, it was announced that Mill Creek Entertainment had acquired the home media rights to various television series from the Sony Pictures library including Married... with Children with the original theme song "Love and Marriage" sung by Frank Sinatra. They have subsequently re-released the 11 seasons on DVD. The Mill Creek Entertainment version (along with the versions available for streaming and downloading) include scenes that are normally edited in syndication and most of the licensed music that's dubbed over or deleted due to copyright issues. A Complete Series DVD set was re-released on July 7, 2015, in Region 1. All seasons of Married... with Children are now available for online download and streaming through Amazon Prime Video, Apple iTunes, Peacock, Hulu, and Vudu.

DVD name	Ep #	Release dates			DVD special features
DVD name	Ep #	Region 1	Region 2	Region 4	DVD special features
Season One	13	October 28, 2003	April 7, 2004	October 25, 2005	Married with Children reunion
Season Two	22	March 16, 2004	October 26, 2004	September 22, 2008	Clips from the 2003 reunion
Season Three	22	January 25, 2005	February 10, 2005	September 22, 2008	Clips from the 2003 reunion
Season Four	23	August 30, 2005	December 22, 2005	September 22, 2008	None
Season Five	25	June 20, 2006	June 27, 2006	September 22, 2008	Promos for other TV shows
Season Six	26	December 19, 2006	August 17, 2006	September 22, 2008	Promos for other TV shows
Season Seven	26	September 18, 2007	October 5, 2006	September 22, 2008	None
Season Eight	26	March 18, 2008	December 19, 2006	October 22, 2008	None
Season Nine	26	August 19, 2008	February 20, 2007	October 22, 2008	None
Season Ten	27	March 17, 2009	March 20, 2007	March 11, 2009	None
Season Eleven	24	October 13, 2009	May 8, 2007	March 11, 2009	Promos for other TV shows
The Big Bundy Box	209	N/A	N/A	December 3, 2008	Seasons 1–9 with room for 10 & 11. Special features same as individual seasons.
The Complete Series	259	October 13, 2009; July 7, 2015 (re-release)	November 22, 2009	November 23, 2009; June 17, 2020 (re-release)	Married with Children reunion (2003); Clips from the 2003 reunion David Faustino interview Katey Sagal interview Promos for other TV shows Bonus wall poster

== Merchandise ==
=== Books ===
- Pig Out with Peg: Secrets from the Bundy Family Kitchen, by Linda Merinoff and Peg Bundy, Avon Books, November 1990, ISBN 0-380-76431-8
- Bundyisms: The Wit and Wisdom of America's Last Family, Boulevard Books, May 1997, ISBN 1572972513
- The Complete "Married... with Children" Book: TV's Dysfunctional Family Phenomenon, by Denis Noe, Bear Manor Media, August 2017, ISBN 1629331899
- Married... with Children vs. the World, by Richard Gurman, Permuted Press, April 2024, ISBN 9781637588314

==== Comic books ====
Married... with Children was adapted into a comic book series by NOW Comics starting in 1990.

=== Toys ===
==== Board game ====
- Married with Children: Act Like...Think Like...Be Like a...Bundy was released in 1990 by Galoob.

==== Dolls and action figures ====
Two series (10 in all) of 8" dolls were produced by Classic TV Toys in 2005 and 2006. In 2018, Funko produced figures of Al, Kelly, Bud and Peggy as a part of their Funko POP! line. That same year, Funko also released a Married... with Children action figures box set. In 2018 and 2019, Mego released Target exclusives of Al, Peggy and Kelly in 1/9 scale.

== International remakes ==
=== Argentina ===
An Argentine remake was made by Telefe in 2005, called Casados con Hijos. Two seasons were made (2005 and 2006), totaling 215 episodes and it became a smashing success during the replaying. More than fifteen years after the release, it is still aired on Saturdays at 7:30 pm. The series has been also shown by local channels in Uruguay, Paraguay, and Peru.

The character names are: José "Pepe" Argento (based on Al, played by Guillermo Francella), Mónica "Moni" Argento (based on Peggy, played by Florencia Peña), Paola Argento (based on Kelly, played by Luisana Lopilato), Alfio "Coqui" Argento (based on Bud, played by Darío Lopilato), Dardo and María Elena Fuseneco (based on Jefferson D'Arcy, Steve Rhoades and Marcy; played by Marcelo de Bellis and Érica Rivas).

=== Armenia ===
An Armenian remake was made in 2016, called The Azizyans, an Armenian television sitcom television developed by Robert Martirosyan and Van Grigoryan. The series premiered on Armenia TV on October 31, 2016. However, it was not available to the public until Armenia TV started airing it from October 10, 2017. It takes place in Yerevan, Armenia. The Azizyans sitcom stars Hayk Marutyan. He embodies the character of Garnik Azizyan – a clothes store seller, who is the only one working in the family. Mrs. Ruzan Azizyan is too lazy to perform the duties of a housewife.

The problems of the father do not bother his 3 children – his daughter, who is internet-addicted and active in all social networks, his unemployed eldest son, a complete loser, and his youngest son, who is a schoolboy. The roles in this sitcom, created for family watching, are played by Ani Lupe, Satenik Hazaryan, Ishkhan Gharibyan, Suren Arustamyan and other popular Armenian actors. The project is directed by Arman Marutyan. In the second season of the sitcom, the Azizyan family continues to survive thanks to the meager salary of Garnik.

Garnik's wife, Ruzan, remains a housewife, without even thinking about finding a job. Their elder son, Azat, continues to look for a new job. A young man appears in Marie's life, trying to win her heart. Their younger son Levon, continues to live his own life and does not understand what he has in common with this family. Their neighbors Irina and Alik continue to be friends with the family, which the Azizyans do not quite approve. The only bright spot in their life is their house, which Garnik inherited from his grandfather.

=== Brazil ===
In Brazil, Rede Bandeirantes made a remake in 1999 with the name A Guerra dos Pintos (The War of The Pintos). 52 episodes were recorded but only 22 aired before cancelation.

=== Bulgaria ===
In Bulgaria a remake is aired from March 26, 2012, with the name Женени с деца в България (Zheneni s detsa v Bulgaria) (Married with children in Bulgaria).

=== Croatia ===
In Croatia, a remake called Bračne vode was broadcast from September 2008 until November 2009 on Nova TV channel. The characters based on the Bundys were called Zvonimir, Sunčica, Kristina and Boris Bandić, while the ones based on Marcy and Steve were called Marica and Ivan Kumarica.

=== Germany ===
In Germany, the 1992 remake Hilfe, meine Familie spinnt, broadcast in the prime time, reached double the audience of the original (broadcast in the early fringe time). This, however, was not enough to maintain the series, so it was cancelled after one season with 26 episodes. The remake used the exact translated scripts of the original series (which already substituted localised humour and in-jokes for incomprehensible references to American TV shows not shown in Germany, as well as some totally different jokes) and just renamed places and people according to the new setting. It had a rerun twice on Super RTL in 1996 and 1997.

Hilfe, meine Familie spinnt was aired from March to December 1993 for 26 episodes.

=== Hungary ===
In 2006, Hungarian TV network TV2 purchased the license rights including scripts and hired the original producers from Sony Pictures for a remake of the show placed in a Hungarian environment. It was entitled Egy rém rendes család Budapesten (in English: Married with children in Budapest, loan translation: A gruesomely decent family in Budapest). The main story began with the new family called the Bándis inheriting an outskirt house from their American relatives the Bundys. They filmed a whole season of 26 episodes, all of them being remade versions of the plots of the original first seasons. It was the highest budget sitcom ever made in Hungary. First it was aired on Tuesday nights, but was beaten by a new season of ER, then placed to Wednesday nights. The remake lost its viewers, but stayed on the air due to the contract between Sony and TV2. Hungarian critics have strongly condemned the copyright infringement of the original series. They also criticized the lack of quality and the dilettante forcing of the American cliches in Eastern European (Hungarian) environment.

=== Israel ===
The complete American series aired in Israel in the 1990s, with reruns of it ever since. There has also been an Israeli remake to the show titled Nesuim Plus (Married Plus) that aired its two seasons from 2012 to 2017.

=== Mexico ===
In May 2023, Sony Pictures Television announced a Mexican remake for Sony Channel. The series premiered on 8 May 2024 and stars Adrián Uribe and Sandra Echeverría.

=== Russia ===
The Original Married... With Children ran on TV-6 Russia in the late 1990s and early 2000s (before the closing of the channel) in prime-time basis, broadcasting the episodes from seasons 1–11. The show later aired on DTV and Domashniy TV. A Russian adaptation, titled Happy Together (Schastlivy Vmeste; Happy Together), was broadcast on TNT across the country in 2006.

The character names are: Gena Bukin (based on Al, played by Viktor Loginov), Dasha Bukina (based on Peggy, played by Natalya Bochkareva), Sveta Bukina (based on Kelly, played by Darya Sagalova), Roma Bukin (based on Bud, played by Alexander Yakin), Elena and Anatoliy Poleno (based on Marcy and Jefferson D'Arcy, played by Yulia Zaharova and Pavel Savinkov), Evgeniy Stepanov (based on Steve Rhoades, played by Aleksey Sekirin), Sema Bukin (based on Seven, played by Ilya Butkovskiy), and Baron Bukin (based on Buck and Lucky, played by Bayra).

=== Turkey ===
A remake was aired in Turkey in 2004 for one season under the name Evli ve Çocuklu (Married and with Children), featuring Ege Aydan and Yıldız Kaplan in the roles of Niyazi (based on Al) and Jale (based on Peg) Tonguç. The producer, Med Yapım, has published 10 episodes on YouTube in 2018.

=== United Kingdom ===
ITV had been screening the original Married... with Children since 1988. In 1996, the British production company Central Television and Columbia Pictures Television (Columbia TriStar Central Productions) produced a British version called Married for Life, which lasted for one series with seven episodes.

== Spin-offs ==
Top of the Heap was a sitcom starring Matt LeBlanc. The show was about Vinnie Verducci (played by LeBlanc) and his father Charlie (played by Joseph Bologna) always trying get rich quick schemes. The Verduccis were introduced in an earlier episode where Vinnie dated Kelly Bundy, and Charlie was introduced as an old friend of Al Bundy's. The end of the pilot episode shows Al breaking into their apartment and stealing their TV to replace the one he lost betting on Vinnie in a boxing match. However, the show did not last long and was ultimately cancelled. It had its own spin-off/sequel called Vinnie & Bobby a year later, which was also cancelled.

Also, an attempt was made to make a spin-off out of David Garrison's Steve Rhoades character which took place on Bud's Trumaine University. The spin-off was called Radio Free Trumaine where Garrison played the Dean. Enemies was another spin-off, but played to be a spoof on the TV series Friends. Meanwhile, a proposed series focusing on the NO MA'AM group without Al Bundy was outright rejected by Fox over fears of misogyny.

On September 11, 2014, it was announced that a spin-off was in the works, centered on the character of Bud Bundy. Ed O'Neill revealed plot details for the proposed spin-off in 2016: "Bud is now grown up and living in the old house with some of his buddies, but they're all bust-outs, they aren't working. His ex-wife is living in one of the bedrooms with Bud's best friend [...] Peg and Al are retired and living in Vegas; they won the lottery."

== Reunions ==
The cast of Married... with Children has remained close-knit since the show's conclusion, making public appearances together as well as taking part in each other's various projects. In 2003, the cast reunited to share their memories of making the show for the one-hour televised reunion special, Married with Children Reunion Special.

=== 2026 live reunions ===
On October 28, 2025, it was announced that Ed O'Neill, Katey Sagal, Christina Applegate, and David Faustino would reunite live on stage for An Evening with The Bundys: The Married with Children Cast Reunion at the Wiltern Theatre in Los Angeles on January 28, 2026. A portion of the ticket sales will go to the multiple sclerosis organization Race to Erase MS.

Another live reunion is set to take place on May 9, 2026, at the Orpheum Theatre in Los Angeles as part of the Netflix Is a Joke Festival.

== Scrapped animated revival ==
On May 13, 2022, Deadline reported that an animated revival of the series was currently in the works with the original cast attached to return. It was further revealed that Sony Pictures Television had been working on the animated series for over a year and waited until they had closed deals with the cast before presenting it to networks and streamers. It was felt that an animated revival worked best due to the original cast's busy schedule. Applegate confirmed in a 2023 Vanity Fair interview that she, O'Neill, Sagal, and Faustino remained attached to the revival and were just waiting.

A sample clip of the animated series leaked onto the internet on May 14, 2024, along with a synopsis and presentation web site.

After a string of misfortunes, the Bundys move to the cheapest home in Dumpwater, FL – a small house with a sinkhole front yard. As they get to know their Latin neighbors, war with HOA snobs, & yuck it up at their community pool, Al is desperate to be a big shot but continually gets fleeced in Florida – where the weather is sunny, but the people are shady. Adapted from the series Married... with Children.

— Animated series synopsis from Sony Pictures

In July 2025, it was confirmed that the animated revival was no longer in development.

== Memoir ==
In April 2024, a memoir, Married... with Children vs. the World, written by Married... with Children writer and producer Richard Gurman, was published by Permuted Press. In it, Gurman gives a behind-the-scenes look at the creation of the show and his time working on it. The show's cast also contributed to the book.

== American syndication and international airings ==
Distributed by Columbia Pictures Television Distribution, later Sony Pictures Television since 2002, (Note: As Sony Pictures Television Studios since 2024) Married... with Children debuted in off-network syndication in the fall of 1991. The series later began airing on cable on FX from September 1999 until September 2008. In June 2002, FX became the first television network to air the controversial, previously banned episode "I'll See You in Court", albeit in an edited format. The full version of "I'll See You in Court" can only be seen on the DVD release Married... with Children: The Most Outrageous Episodes Volume 1 and the Mill Creek Entertainment complete series collection. The version found on the Third Season DVD set under Sony is the edited-for-TV version. In 2008, the Spike network reportedly paid US$12 million for broadcast rights to every episode including the unedited version of the infamous episode "I'll See You in Court".

Following its acquisition by Nexstar Media Group and rebrand to NewsNation, the network indicated it would start rolling off its non-news programming as those contracts expire to expand news coverage. In November 2018, the entire 11-season run became available to watch through Hulu. On September 17, 2018, GetTV began airing the show and continued until around 2020 or 2021. In July 2024, Cozi TV acquired the rights to the show along with The King of Queens and began airing on August 5, 2024.

Married...with Children has also been a ratings success in other countries around the world.

Country	Foreign title	Translation	Network(s)	Notes
Brazil	Um amor de Família (A Lovely Family)	Dubbed; Subtitled	Sony Entertainment Television; PlayTV Rede 21	The show runs on Sony Entertainment Television and Comedy Central Brasil (since 2012 February) with original sound and subtitles, the dubbed version runs on PlayTV (also aired when it was called Rede 21). 57 dubbed and subtitled episodes are now available on the Brazilian version of Netflix.
Bulgaria	Женени с деца (Married with Children)	Dubbed	bTV; Fox life Diema	Airing on bTV Comedy.
Canada	Married...with Children	None	CMT; Global; Spike; DejaView; TVtropolis; CFMT; Much; MTV	Broadcasting on Spike, DejaView, Much, and MTV. Episodes available to stream for free (with ads) on the CTV app.
Chile	Casado con hijos (Married... with Children)	Subtitled	Sony Entertainment Television	Today the show runs on Sony Entertainment Television.
Colombia	Casado con hijos (Married... with Children)	Subtitled	Cadena 1 Sony Entertainment Television; Comedy Central	The original series aired in Colombia presented by Cinevision on Channel 1 from 1992 to 1994. Reruns on the original language aired on basic cable channels Sony and Comedy Central. The Colombian remake Casados con hijos aired on Caracol Channel (2004–2006, 2011–2012) and CityTv (2014–2016).
Croatia	Bračne vode (Marriage Waters)	Subtitled	HRT; RTL Televizija; Nova TV; Fox Life	The show runs on Nova TV and Fox Life.
Czech Republic	Ženatý se závazky (Married with commitments)	Dubbed	TV Prima; TV Nova; Nova Cinema; Smíchov	The show runs weekly from Monday to Friday on TV Smíchov.
Denmark	Vore værste år (Our Worst Years)	Subtitled	TV3; Comedy Central	
Dominican Republic	Casado con Hijos (Married with Children)	Dubbed	Telesistema Canal 11	
Estonia	Tuvikesed (Loveydoves)	Subtitled	Kanal 12	Broadcast before midnight on Kanal 12, episodes rerun on the next weekday morning.
Finland	Pulmuset (Loveydoves)	Subtitled	MTV3; Nelonen; TV5	Being rerun on TV5.
France	Mariés, deux enfants (Married, Two Children)	Dubbed	M6; Comédie!	Runs on the cable channel Comédie!.
Germany	Eine schrecklich nette Familie (An Awfully Nice Family)	Dubbed	RTL; ProSieben; Kabel1; Comedy Central kabel eins classics RTL Nitro	It first ran from 1992 on RTL ("RTLplus" at that time), moving to ProSieben for the final 51 episodes, ending in 1997. It airs two episodes a day Monday-Friday on RTL Nitro, with an additional two episodes on Thursday night.
Greece	Παντρεμένοι με παιδιά (Married with Children)	Subtitled	ANT1; Mega Channel; Makedonia TV	The series returned on January 9, 2016, for reruns, airing every weekend at 10:40 p.m., starting from season 1, on Mega Channel which initially aired just the last seasons.
Hungary	Egy rém rendes család (A gruesomely decent family)	Dubbed	TV3; RTL Klub; Viasat 3 CoolTV; Humor+	A cable television called CoolTV airs 3 episodes and PrizmaTV 2 episodes each day.
Italy	Sposati...con figli (Married...with Children)	Dubbed	Canale 5 Sky Show	
Norway	Bundy (Bundy)	Subtitled	TV3; Viasat 4	Originally named Våre verste år (Our worst years), but was later renamed Bundy. It had its on run on TV3, and now in reruns after midnight every day except weekends on TV3. Reruns have also been shown on TV3's sister channel Viasat 4.
Poland	Świat według Bundych (The World According to the Bundys)	Voice-over	Polsat	The show was aired many times on Polsat and is still broadcast on that channel. The series' success brought about a local TV show Świat według Kiepskich (The World According to the Kiepskis) that paraphrased the Polish title of Married... with Children; however, the premise of the Polish show is significantly different from that of the American original (e.g. has got other characters only similar to the original ones and satirises Polish, not American reality), which is why it is usually not considered a remake. In the book "Świat według Kiepskich. Zwariowana historia kultowego serialu" (The World According to the Kiepskis. A crazy story of the cult TV series) by Jabłonka and Łęczuk, a producer of Świat według Kiepskich- Tomasz Kurzewski says that Polsat wanted to create a brand new sitcom and announced a competition for the best idea and Kurzewski was advised to make a Polish version of the most popular Polsat sitcom, which was Married... with Children and competitive ideas were not connected with Married... with Children, so the American TV series is only an inspiration of the Polish one, not an original version of a remake. Świat według Kiepskich was not made under the American licence.
Romania	Familia Bundy (The Bundy Family)	Subtitled	Pro TV	The show was aired in the 1990s, multiple times.
Russia	Женаты... с детьми (Married... with Children), Счастливы вместе (Happy Together)	Voice-over (original)	TV-6, DTV, Domashniy TV (original); TNT (remake)	The Russian remake of the show, Счастливы вместе, has been broadcast since March 2006 on TNT every weekday. The series was cancelled in 2013.
Serbia	Брачне воде / Bračne vode (Marriage Waters)	Dubbed (Season 1); Subtitled	Fox televizija Fox Life	Fox televizija aired season 1 dubbed, by the studio "Prizor". The show aired on Fox Life too, with all of its seasons in subtitles only.
Spain	Matrimonio con hijos (Marriage with Children)	Dubbed	TVE2; SET en VEO	The original series was a classic that ran for a decade in the public national channel TVE2. The Spanish TV channel Cuatro did a remake of the original series under the name Matrimonio con Hijos. In Catalonia, the Catalan dub was aired on the DTT channels Canal 300, while in Valencia the full series was aired with a dub of their own.
Sweden	Våra värsta år (Our Worst Years)	Subtitled	TV3; ZTV; TV6	The name "Våra värsta år" is a pun on the name "Våra bästa år" ("Our best years") as Days of Our Lives is called in Swedish.
Ukraine	Одружені... та з дітьми (Married... with Children); Щасливі разом (Happy Together)	Voice-over	TET, 1+1 (original); Novyi Kanal (Russian remake)	The show aired on TET (first two seasons) in 2009 and on 1+1 (all seasons) in 2011–2012. The Russian remake of the show, Счастливы вместе, is being shown on Novyi Kanal (New Channel) every Sunday from 12:20–14:20. There was also a Ukrainian version of Polish Świat według Kiepskich which was called Nepruhi and was aired in 2010.

== Locations ==
The opening footage comprises views of Chicago, opening with a shot of Buckingham Fountain in Grant Park. The aerial downtown shot was taken from the Lake Shore Drive section north of the Loop. The expressway entrance shot was taken from the 1983 movie National Lampoon's Vacation featuring the Griswolds' green family truckster with a northeastward view of the Dan Ryan/Stevenson junction southwest of the Loop. The exterior shot used for the Bundys' house was taken in a subdivision in Deerfield, Illinois. Non-English versions might differ, e.g. the dubbed German version always includes the expressway shot.

== See also ==
- Modern Family, a show where Ed O'Neill also plays a family man.
- Star-ving, a web series created by David Faustino, where the original cast was reunited.
- Unhappily Ever After, another show created by Ron Leavitt, treating similar themes.
