= Fizruk =

Russian television series

- Genre: Drama; Sitcom
- Created by: Fyodor Stukov; Sergey Sentsov
- Country of origin: Russia
- Original language: Russian
- No. of seasons: 4
- No. of episodes: 77

Production
- Producers: Anton Zaytsev; Alexander Dulerayn; Yevgeny Nikishov; Anton Shchukin; Anton Loginov; Konstantin Mayer; Dmitry Lanskoy
- Camera setup: Konstantin Postnikov; Bakhodyr Yuldashev
- Running time: 21—25 minutes
- Production company: Good Story Media

Original release
- Network: TNT
- Release: 7 April 2014 – 1 November 2017

Fizruk (Russian: Физрук) (Note: Физрук is a Russian acronym for "физкультурный руководитель", i.e., "teacher of physical education") is a Russian situation comedy television series. The first run started on 7 April 2014.

In 2015, Fizruk received the TEFI Television Award.

== Plot ==
This is a story about the collision of two times: the "dashing" 90s and the "stable" tenths. The main character Foma has been the "right hand" of an influential Moscow businessman with a semi-criminal past all his life. When his boss fires Foma because of his "outdated" methods of work, Foma decides to go back at all costs. At first it seemed that everything would be simple: get close to the child of the former boss, bend over, remind yourself of yourself and return to business. But Thomas' plan collapses on the first day. He has to stay at school for a long time. Once in a completely unfamiliar world of children and teachers, which is radically different from his usual circle, Foma not only changes his life, but also changes himself.

== Cast ==
- Dmitry Nagiyev as Foma
- Anastasiya Panina as Tatyana Chernyshova
- Vladimir Sychyov as Psikh
- Alexander Gordon as Mamay
- Viktor Sukhorukov as Ernest Shilovsky
- Sofya Rayzman as Sofya
- Daniil Muravyov-Izotov as Petya
- Aleksandr Yakin as Sanya
- Georgy Kudrenko as Vitalik
- Yelena Muravyova as Lukovka
- Karina Mishulina as Svetlana Yermakova
- Yevgeny Kulakov as Lev
- Roman Indyk as Albert Moiseyevich
- Natalya Korennaya as Olga Timofeyevna
- Yekaterina Lisovaya as Vera Ivanovna
- Sergey Plaksin as Georgy Kuzmich
- Daniil Vakhrushev as Valya
- Artur Sopelnik as Borzy
- Viktoriya Klinkova as Pupok
- Andrey Kryzhny as Banan
- Sergey Zhuravlyov as Minus
- Dmitry Gogu as Oduvan
- Varvara Bogdanova as Cheburashka
- Yan Tsapnik as Khromulya
- Yekaterina Melnik as Belka
- Igor Lifanov as Gena
- Evgeniya Dmitrieva as Ksenia Panina
- Boris Klyuyev as Chernyshov
- Aleksandr Kokorin, Alexei Ivanov, Sergey Lemokh, Sergey Zhukov, Igor Vernik, Sergey Shnurov, Roman Viktyuk as cameo
