= Kirkland Performance Center =

Theater in downtown Kirkland, Washington

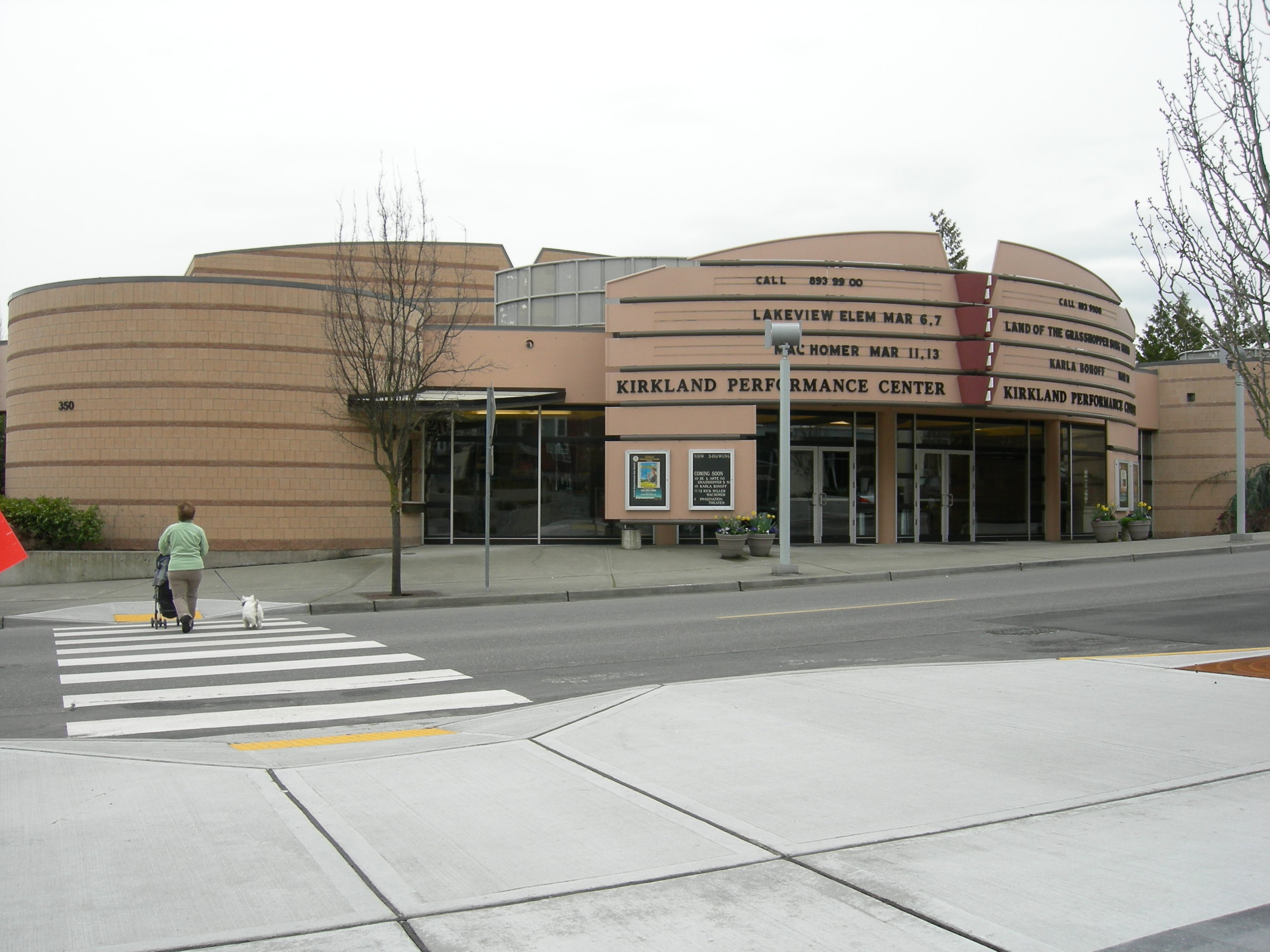
- Interactive map of Kirkland Performance Center
- Location: Kirkland, Washington
- Coordinates: 47.6757°N 122.201°W

Website
- Official website

The Kirkland Performance Center is a 394-seat theater in downtown Kirkland, Washington. It opened in June 1998. The campaign to open the center was supported by Kirkland leaders, including former city councilman Larry Springer and former mayor Bill Woods. After raising about $100,000, the city of Kirkland eventually chipped in about $1.4 million for the creation of the center. State, county, and individual contributions supplied the rest, totaling to about $5.8 million. In 2014, Jeff Lockhart came on as executive director. The following year, in the center's 16th season, interior and exterior renovations were done to reflect the change in programming, including emphasizing performances by Seattle indie groups.

== Notable performances ==
- Philip Glass (2012)
- Judith Hill (2017)
- Rufus Wainwright (2018 and 2022)
