= Natalya Bochkareva =

Russian actress and television presenter

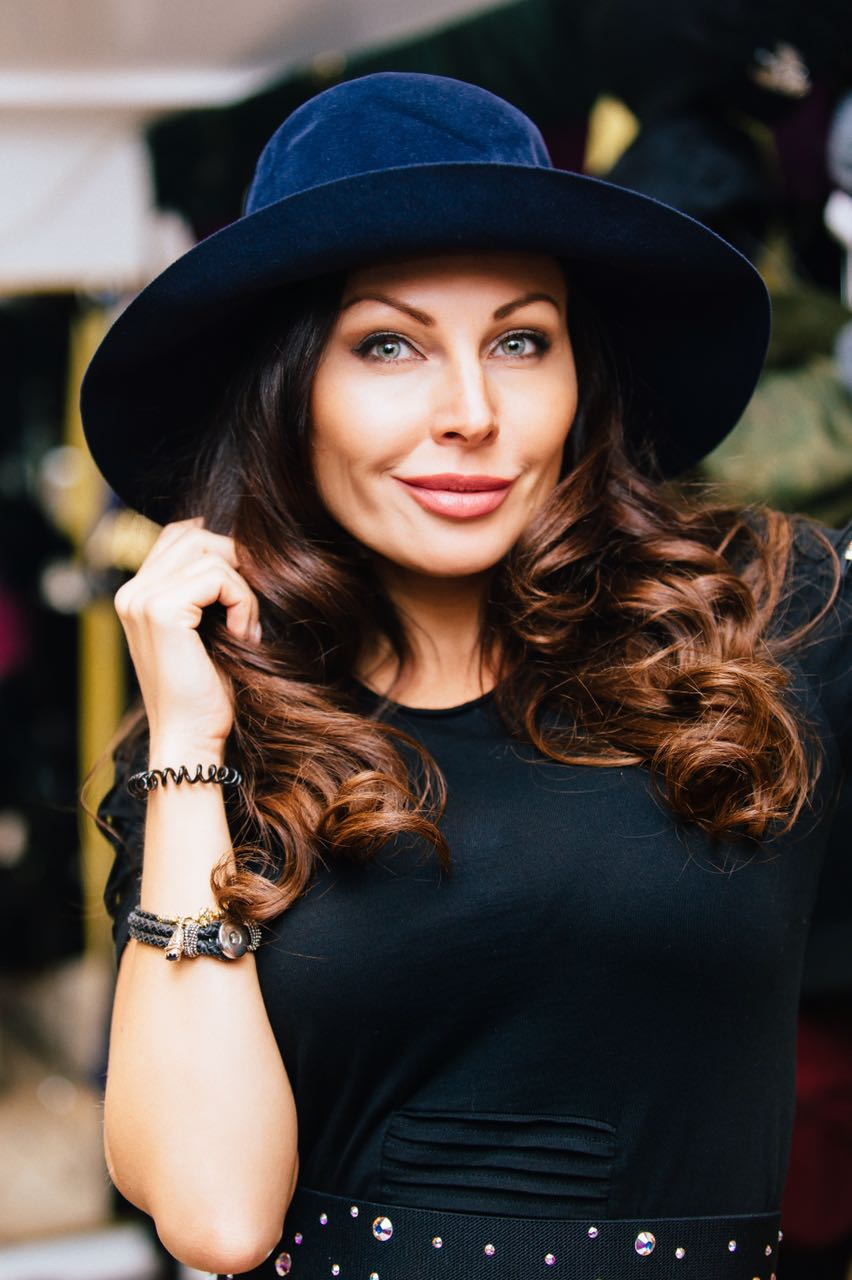
- Born: Natalya Vladimirovna; July 25, 1980 (age 46); Gorky, Russian SFSR, USSR [now Nizhny Novgorod, Russia]
- Occupations: Actress, television presenter
- Years active: 1999–present
- Spouse(s): Nikolai Borisov (m.2007-present; 2 children)
- Children: Ivan Borisov; January 4, 2007 (age 19); Maria Borisova; February 22, 2008 (age 18)
- Parent: Vladimir Bochkarev (deceased)
- Relatives: Nadezhda Bochkareva (younger sister); Alysa Borisova (step-daughter)

Natalya Vladimirovna Bochkareva (Russian: Ната́лья Влади́мировна Бочкарёва; July 25, 1980) is a Russian stage and film actress and television presenter.

== Biography ==
Natalya Vladimirovna Bochkareva was born in Gorky (now Nizhny Novgorod) on July 25, 1980. Both her parents died - her mother at age 54 from complications after strokes - and her father at age 52 several years later. She has one sibling, younger sister Nadezhda Bochkareva.

She graduated from Nizhny Novgorod Theatre School in 2000 and from Moscow Art Theatre School in 2002.

== Career ==
She started her career in 1999 when she played a small role in the movie Chinese Service.

From 2006 to 2013, she played the main role of Darya Bukina in the Russian TV series Happy Together - an adaptation of the American TV series Married... with Children.

Since 2002, she has been an actress for the Moscow Art Theatre, and since 2010 she has worked as a television presenter.

In 2018, she appeared in the comedy film Night Shift.

== Personal life ==
On September 28, 2007, she married lawyer Nikolai Borisov. They have two children, son Ivan Borisov (born January 4, 2007) and daughter Maria Borisova (born February 22, 2008). Natalya also has a step-daughter, Alysa Borisova.

In 2019, Bochkaryova married Roman Gavrilov. On 3 December 2022, it was reported that the actress was pregnant with her third child. On 1 April 2023, she confirmed that she had given birth, without disclosing the child's sex. On 2 June 2023, during an appearance on the television programme Life and Fate, the actress stated that she had given birth to a son, Alexander.

== Drug possession arrest ==
On the night of 28–29 September 2019, the actress was detained for possession of cocaine. During the investigation, Bochkaryova fully admitted her guilt and expressed remorse, although she had initially denied the accusation.

On 20 January 2020, the Preobrazhensky District Court of Moscow fined the actress 30,000 rubles and terminated the criminal case against her. The investigator stated that Bochkaryova had made amends "by transferring funds to Yevgeny Voskresensky's charitable foundation".
