= Aiza-Liluna Ai =

Russian rapper and businesswoman (born 1984)

- Born: Aiza Khamzatovna Vagapova; December 10, 1984 (age 41); Grozny, Russian SFSR, Soviet Union
- Occupations: Television presenter; rapper; entrepreneur

Aiza-Liluna Khamzatovna Ai (Russian: Айза-Лилуна Хамзатовна Ай) (born Aiza Khamzatovna Vagapova (Russian: Айза Хамзатовна Вагапова), later Dolmatova (Russian: Долматова) and Anokhina (Russian: Анохина); 10 December 1984, Grozny) is a Russian TV presenter, rap singer, and businesswoman. She was formerly married to rapper Guf.

== Biography ==
She recorded the songs "Famalam" and "I Don't Know TP", which placed 4th on the Google Play charts.

In 2019, she released the single "Portman".

She is the founder and owner of the Ai Lab beauty salon chain. In 2021, she received the Cosmopolitan Beauty Awards for Best Beauty Salon Chain.

== Personal life ==
From 2008 to 2014, she was married to Alexey Dolmatov (Guf). On May 5, 2010, the couple had a son, Sami.

From 2015 to 2020, she was married to surfer Dmitry Anokhin. The couple had a son, Elvis, in 2016.

In October 2020, she changed her last name from Anokhina to her first husband Dolmatov's last name.

== Discography ==
=== Albums ===
«The Monkey»
Review scores
Source	Rating
InterMedia	3/5 stars

Year	Title	Information
2018	«The Monkey»	Released: 13 April 2018; Format: CD; Label: Media Land
