= SashaTanya =

- Genre: Comedy, Situation comedy, Sitcom
- Created by: Vyacheslav Dusmuchametov; Semyon Slepakov
- Written by: Salim Rachmanov, Vladislav Pak, Emil Valiev
- Directed by: Michael Starchak; Sergey Kazachansky
- Composers: Irina Tumanova; Svetlana Khodchenkova
- Country of origin: Russia
- Original language: Russian
- No. of seasons: 8
- No. of episodes: 300

Production
- Executive producer: Taymuraz Badziev
- Producers: Artur Janibekyan; Alexander Dulerayn; Vyacheslav Dusmuchametov; Semyon Slepakov
- Camera setup: Alexander Kuznetsov; Yury Korobeinikov
- Running time: 20–24 minutes
- Production company: Comedy Club Production

Original release
- Network: TNT; NLO TV; Novyi Kanal; NTK
- Release: 3 June 2013 – present

SashaTanya (Russian: СашаТаня) is a Russian situation comedy television series, a spin-off of Univer. The first run started on June 3, 2013.

== Plot ==
After graduation, Sasha and Tanya move into a two-room rented apartment on the outskirts of Moscow with their son. Sylvester A. Sergeyev cares about them. In a season 2 Sasha is doing well at work, and he is buying an apartment in a new residential complex. Sylvester A. Sergeyev is marrying Eva and becomes a father of a daughter.

== Main сharacters ==
=== Sasha Sergeev ===
Sasha Sergeev was a student of the Astronomical Faculty in the past, Insurance Manager at present. From the Season 2 he is a General Manager, Insurance. He is married to Tanya, with whom he lived in a dormitory. He has a son Alex. He loves fast food, because dissatisfied with Tatiana’s cooking. To the displeasure of his wife it is affecting his figure. He is struggling to be independent from his father, oligarch Sylvester A. Sergeyev.

=== Tanya Sergeeva ===
Tanya Sergeeva is a posting-graduate student of Law Faculty in the past. She is a wife of Sasha Sergeev, with whom she lived in a dormitory. In the Season 1 she was a housewife. From the Season 2 she is an Administrator in a Beauty Salon.

== Minor characters ==
=== Aleksey ===
Aleksey is a son of Sasha and Tanya. He was born in that times when they were students.

=== Sylvester A. Sergeyev ===
Sylvester A. Sergeyev is an oligarch, dollar billionaire (37th place in the Forbes), a father of Sasha. He lives on Rublyovka, and he has an expensive luxury car Rolls-Royce Phantom LONG. He is cynical, harsh, hot-tempered, but he has a very good sense of humor. Sylvester A. Sergeyev always tries to help to son and his family financially, though he understands that they don't like it. He often criticizes Gena using humorous epithets, but he considers Gena as a part of his family. In a Season 2 he married Eva, loved her very much and he cared about her and daughter.

=== Gena ===
Gena is Sylvester A. Sergeyev’s head bodyguard. Born in Zlatoust, he previously served in the Russian Airborne Troops. Although initially portrayed as taciturn and stern, he is a capable bodyguard with artistic abilities. Sergeyev often jokes about him, but Gena remains devoted to him.

=== Gosha Rudkovsky ===
A student of the Faculty of Journalism, he was in the army. Tricky and lazy. He loves beer and video games. He has a good sense of humor, but mostly makes jokes on his friends. He is a friend of Sasha and Tanya, and he dates Lily Volkova (they married in Episode 65).

=== Lily Volkova ===
A student of Faculty of Biology. She was born in Ufa. She is fond of spiritualism and esoteric, very superstitious person. She always tells the truth (even insulting one) and she can’t keep people's secrets. She is vegetarian, extravagance in everything, but in the Season 2 she is more calm. A friend of Sasha and Tanya, she dates with Gosha Rudkovsky (they married in Episode 65).

=== Arthur "Michael" Mikaelyan ===
Armenian from Adler. Womanizer. He graduated from the Faculty of History; he started to study in post-graduate course to avoid the conscription. He has a good sense of humor, a common sense, and he is very well in business, which helps him expertly extricate from a variety of unpleasant situations. A friend of Sasha and Tanya.

=== Vyacheslav Grigorievich ===
Vyacheslav Grigorievich Komarov is Sasha's boss. He is democratic: he regularly catches employees for laziness, inactivity and mistakes at work, but he tells them about this with a bit of humor and irony.

=== Albert ===
Neighbor of Sasha and Tanya. He prefers sporty style clothes and drinking alcohol. He is harmless, always ready (for a small fee) to help, but does not disdain small frauds (eg, in the Season 2 he takes the place of concierge in the building where Sergeyev lives).

=== Edyard "Kuzya" Kuzmin ===
He studied at the Faculty of Philology and was also involved in sports. He enjoys playing the guitar and writes and performs his own songs. He previously practised karate and earned a black belt, but had to give up the sport following a head injury. He is also a skilled chess player. Born in Agapovka, he spent much of his time in Kurgan. He is a friend of Sasha and Tanya.

=== Eva ===
Eva Sergeeva is a former flight attendant from Krasnoyarsk, a wife Sylvester A. Sergeyev at present (Episode 56), mother of his daughter. She appears in Season 2. She is nice and friendly. She turns to Tanya for assistance in family life, considering her more experienced in it.

== Cast ==
- Andrey Gaidulyan as Sasha Sergeev
- Valentina Rubtsova as Tanya Sergeeva
- Артемий Широков, Yuriy Kepper as Alex
- Alexey Klimushkin as Sylvester A. Sergeyev
- Andrey Sviridov as Gena
- Larisa Baranova as Lily Volkova
- Alexey Gavrilov as Gosha Rudkovsky
- Ararat Keschyan as Arthur "Michael" Mikaelyan
- Sergey Rudzevich as Vyacheslav Grigorievich
- Pavel Kassniskiy as Albert
- Alina Lanina as Eva
- Svetlana Khodchenkova as Veronica

=== Episodes ===
- Vitaliy Gogunskiy as Edward "Kuzya" Kuzmin (Episodes 1.1, 1.20)
- Stanislav Yarushin as Anton Martinov (Episodes 1.6, 1.8)
- Anna Kuzina as Yana Semakina (Episodes 1.6, 1.8)
- nastasya Samburskaya as Kristina Sokolovskaya (Episodes 1.6, 1.8)
- Anna Khilkevich as Maria Belova (Episodes 1.6, 1.8)
- Irina Rizhakova as Regina, owner of the apartment (Episode 1.9)
- Ashot Keschyan as Ashot Mikaelyan, brother of Arthur (Episode 1.9)
- Sergey Murzin as Neighbor (Episode 1.14)
- Elena Khlibko as Lingerie shop worker (Episode 1.18)
- Irina Bashkireva as Galina, Tanya's mother
- Dmirtiy Filimonov as Nikolay, Tanya's father

=== Invited celebrities ===
- Elka — Episode 1.5
- Sergey Zverev — Episode 1.21
- Vlad Topalov — New Year Episode
- Pavel Volya — New Year Episode
- Diskoteka Avariya — New Year Episode
- Ekaterina Varnava — Episodes 2.2, 2.5
- Timur Batrutdinov — Episode 2.10
- Sergey Saphronov — Episode 2.18
- Gradusi — Episode 2.25
- Sergey Gorelikov — Episode 2.26

== Film credits ==
=== Idea ===
- Vyacheslav Dusmuchametov
- Semyon Slepakov

=== Directed by ===
- Michael Starchak
- Sergey Kazachansky

=== Camera ===
- Alexander Kuznetsov
- Yury Korobeinikov

=== Executive producer ===
- Taymuraz Badziev

=== Creative producers ===
- Maxim Shkalikov
- Alexey Ivanov
- Zaur Bolotaev

=== Producers ===
- Artur Janibekyan
- Alexander Dulerayn
- Vyacheslav Dusmuchametov
- Semyon Slepakov
