= Happy Together (Russian TV series) =

- Genre: Sitcom
- Created by: Ron Leavitt; Michael G. Moye
- Starring: Victor Loginov; Natalya Bochkareva; Darya Sagalova; Aleksandr Yakin; Yulia Zaharova; Pavel Savinkov
- Composers: Nikolai Rostov; Ivan Lubennikov
- Country of origin: Russia
- No. of seasons: 6
- No. of episodes: 365

Production
- Producers: 1-6 Seasons: Dmitry Troitsky; Alisa Tanskaya; 1-5 Seasons: Timur Vainshteyn; Oleg Osipov; Rauf Atamalibekov; 6th Season: Pyotr Gudkov; Viktor Gel’man; Darya Komleva
- Running time: 20-25 minutes
- Production companies: Lean M Sony Pictures Television International (seasons 1–3); Sony Pictures Television (seasons 4–6)

Original release
- Network: TNT
- Release: March 8, 2006 – March 1, 2013

Happy Together (Russian: Сча́стливы вме́сте, romanized: Schastlivy vmeste) is a Russian TV series that was broadcast on TNT from 2006 through 2013. It is a remake of the American TV series Married... with Children.

== Plot ==
Instead of living in a house, the Bukins live in a box on the top floor of a small building, and the Stepanovs and Polenos live in the box in front of theirs. Prior to the series' beginning, the Bukins could buy off a part of the building's attic for extra rooms, so apart from the lack of a cellar, the lack of a backdoor, a garage in a separate building instead of being adjacent to the house, and a balcony used instead of the yard, the layout of Bukins' flat looks like the Bundys' house. The apartment is in a mess from some fixes in the house which were never finished, and in the show's early episodes an unfortunately placed construction site outside allowed people (and Baron, the family dog) to go in and out the Bukins' apartment by the balcony.

As a major change, instead of disappearing like Seven after a few episodes, Syoma stays with the Bukins until the end of the series, and the often bizarre explanations for his absence from events the whole family should attend became a running gag. Also, the family dog Baron does not die and reincarnate, he remains the same until the end of the series. The episode Requiem For The Dead Briard was however adapted, with Baron being sold to a rich person by Syoma instead of dying.

In April 2008, the producers announced all episodes of Married... With Children have been adapted as Schastlivy vmeste (including all the episodes from the seldom seen 11th season) and an online contest was started where fans could submit new ideas for episodes. Starting from the 31 December 2009, the show resumed its run with an initial order of 60 new episodes, the order might be doubled based on the viewers' response. According to the episodes' opening credits, some of the new episodes are co-written by original Married... With Children writers, mostly Richard Gurman and Katherine Green.

The series was cancelled in 2013.

== Characters ==
- Gena Bukin (Russian: Геннадий Петрович Букин) (based on Al, played by Victor Loginov)
- Dasha Bukina (Russian: Евдокия «Даша» Евкакиевна Букина) (based on Peggy, played by Natalya Bochkareva)
- Sveta Bukina (Russian: Светлана Геннадьевна Букина) (based on Kelly, played by Darya Sagalova)
- Roman Bukin (Russian: Роман Геннадьевич Букин) (based on Bud, played by Aleksandr Yakin)
- Yelena (Russian: Елена Владимировна Полено) and Anatoly Poleno (Russian: Анатолий Иванович Полено) (based on Marcy and Jefferson D'Arcy, played by Yulia Zaharova and Pavel Savinkov)
- Yevgeny Stepanov (Russian: Евгений Варфоломеевич Степанов) (based on Steve Rhoades, played by Aleksey Sekirin)
- Syoma Bukin (Russian: Сёма Букин) (based on Seven, played by Ilya Butkovsky)
- Baron Bukin (Russian: Барон Букин) (based on Buck and Lucky, played by Bayra)

== Broadcast dates ==
Season	Episodes	Date of Release	
Season	Episodes	First Aired	Last Aired
1	100	March 2006	December 2006
2	96	June 2007	November 2007
3	49	April 2008	May 2008
4	49	December 2009	April 2010
5	21	September 13, 2010	October 7, 2010 (20th Episode); August 9, 2012 (21st Episode, Ukraine)
6	49 (50)	July 10, 2012	September 19, 2012 (49th Episode, Ukraine); January 1, 2013 (50th Episode, Ukraine)
Overall	364 (365)	March 8, 2006 — January 1, 2013	
