= Univer. New Dorm =

- Genre: Sitcom
- Written by: Vyacheslav Dusmuhametov; Semyon Slepakov; Artur Dzhanibekyan; Alexander Dulerayn
- Directed by: Konstantin Smirnov; Maxim Zykov; Timofey Shotalov; Rustam Mosafir
- Starring: Stanislav Yarushin; Ararat Keshchyan; Alexander Stekolnikov; Nastasya Samburskaya; Anna Kuzina; Anna Khilkevich
- Music by: Promuse
- Country of origin: Russia
- Original language: Russian

Production
- Cinematography: Ivan Mamonov; Yury Korobeynikov; Ivan Lebedev
- Editor: 7 Art Media
- Running time: 22–25 minutes

Original release
- Release: 10 October 2011 – 11 October 2018

Related
- Univer

Univer. New Dorm (Russian: Униве́р. Новая общага, romanized: Univer. Novaya obshchaga) is a Russian comedy sitcom was aired on the TNT channel from October 10, 2011 to 2018 October 1 . The show is a spin-off of the popular Russian TV Series Univer.

== Plot ==
The action takes place after the events of the series Univer. The dorm where the characters lived in the previous series got demolished and three students, Michael, Anton and Kusya move into a new dorm, where they are placed in a unit with three girls, Kristina, Masha, and Yana. The plot revolves around comedic situations and relationships formed among the students.

== Main cast ==
- Stanislav Yarushin as Anton Martynov
- Ararat Keshchyan as Arthur Mikaelyan
- Vitaly Gogunsky as Eduard Kuzmin (season 1)
- Nastasya Samburskaya as Kristina Sokolovskaya (season 1-3)
- Anna Khilkevich as Masha Belova
- Anna Kuzina as Yana Semakina
- Aleksandr Stekolnikov as Valentin Budeyko (season 2-onward)
- Anastasiya Ivanova as Yulya (season 2)
- Konstantin Shelyagin as Maxim (season 3, recurring season 2)
- Grigory Kokotkin as Aleksey (season 3, recurring season 2)
- Yuliya Frants as Victoria Beaver (season 3)
- Ekaterina Shumakova as Veronica Beaver (season 3)
