= Univer (Russian TV series) =

Russian sitcom

- Screenplay by: Vyacheslav Dusmuhametov; Semyon Slepakov; Yevgeny Sobolev
- Directed by: Pyotr Tochilin; Zhanna Kadnikova; Ivan Kitaev; Roman Samgin
- Starring: Andrey Gaydulyan; Valentina Rubtsova; Svetlana Khodchenkova; Mariya Kozhevnikova; Vitaly Gogunsky; Ararat Keschyan
- Country of origin: Russia
- Original language: Russian

Production
- Cinematography: Yuri Vazhnov; Dmitry Vetchinin; Dmitry Karnachik
- Editor: 7 Арт Медиа
- Running time: 23 min

Original release
- Release: 2008 – 2011

Univer (Russian: Универ) is a Russian sitcom which aired on TNT about the life of students living in a dormitory block in Moscow. The show aired from 2008 to 2011, having a total of 5 seasons and 255 episodes. The show triggered two spin-offs: Univer. New Dorm (started in 2011) and SashaTanya (started in 2013).

== Plot ==
Son of an oligarch Sylvester Sergeev, Sasha, escaped from a university in England, where he studied finance, and enrolled in the Astronomy Department of the Physics Faculty of MVGU, a university in Moscow. Sylvester wants his son to return to his former life, but Sasha believes that he must achieve everything by himself and refuses financial support from his father. Parallel to this, other students living with Sasha go through various entertaining situations and build long-lasting relationships.

== Cast ==
- Andrey Gaydulyan as Sasha Sergeev
- Valentina Rubtsova as Tanya Arkhipova-Sergeeva
- Mariya Kozhevnikova as Alla Grishko
- Vitaly Gogunsky as Eduard Kuzmin
- Svetlana Khodchenkova as Tatyana
- Ararat Keschyan as Arthur Mikaelyan (season 2-5)
- Alexey Klimushkin as Silvestr Andreevich Sergeev
- Alexey Gavrilov as Gosha Rudkovsky (season 1, 4–5, guest season 2)
- Larisa Baranova as Lily Volkova (season 4-5)
- Stanislav Yarushin as Anton Martynov (season 5)

== Cameo ==
- Pavel Volya
- Olga Buzova
- Martina Stella
- Garik Martirosyan
- Anfisa Chekhova
- Vladimir Kristovsky
- Sergei Glushko
- Nyusha
