= Daria Pynzar =

Russian businesswoman, model and blogger

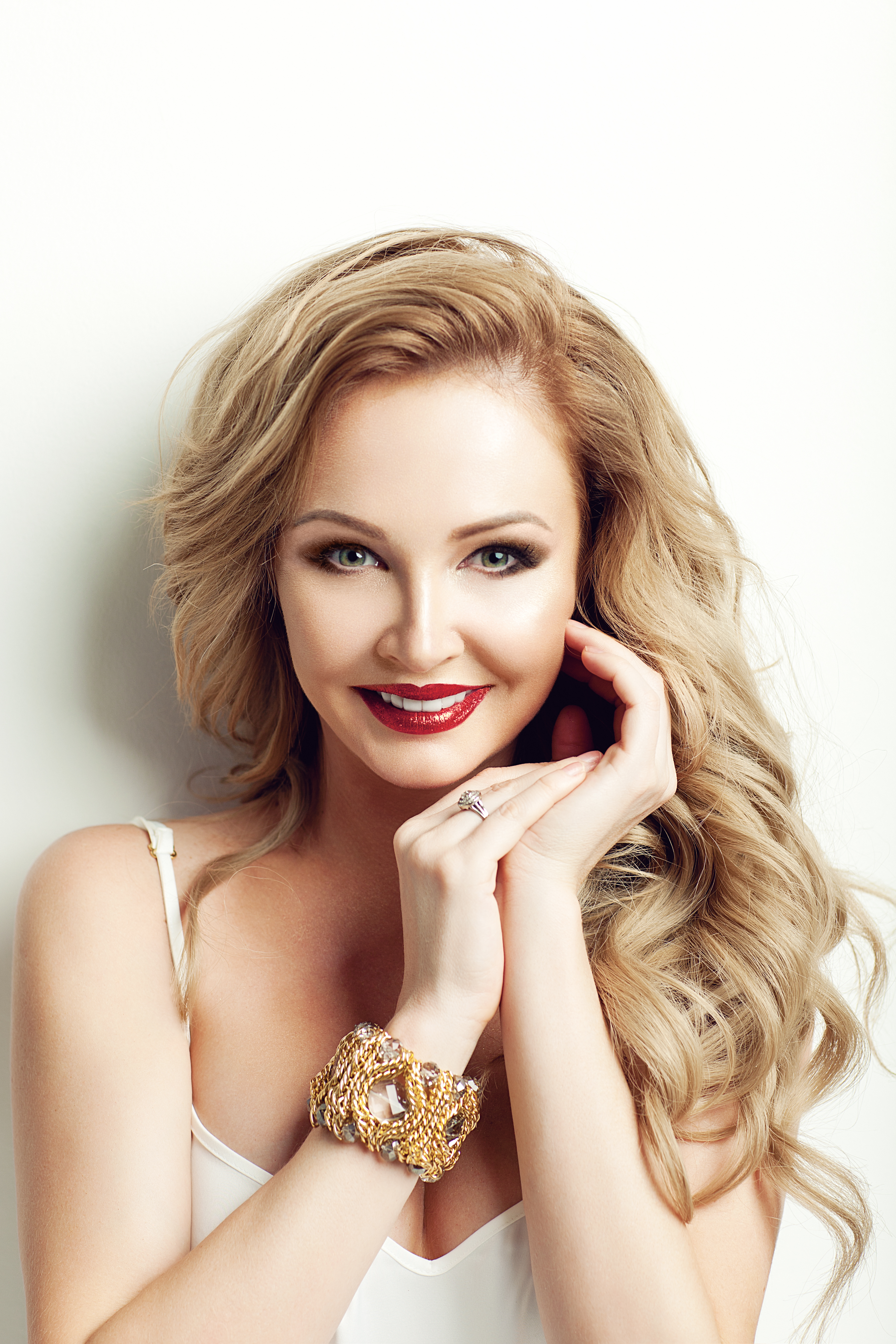
- Born: Daria Vitaliyevna Chernykh; January 6, 1986 (age 40); Yenakievo, Donetsk Oblast, Ukrainian Soviet Socialist Republic, Soviet Union
- Occupations: businesswoman, model, blogger, TV host
- Years active: since 2007
- Known for: Dom-2 participant

Daria Vitaliyevna Pynzar, née Chernykh (Russian: Дарья Витальевна Пынзарь (Черных), born 6 January 1986) is a Russian businesswoman, model, blogger and TV host known for her participation in the Dom-2 TV reality show.

== Biography ==
Daria Chernykh comes from Yenakievo, Donetsk Oblast.

=== TV celebrity ===
On the third year of her education Daria entered the TV reality show Dom-2 and began her career in show business. She met her future husband Sergei Pynzar at the project and left the project finally in 2015 after the marriage. At the current moment she is the host of Domashny TV Channel: she took part in the show “The Pregnant Ones” while expecting the birth of her second child and in the show “Wedding Size” together with her husband Sergei Pynzar. She is the co-host of the show “Happy Mom’s Diary” (together with Lipa Teterich and Yelena Kuletskaya).

Pynzar uses Instagram to post advice related to raising children.

=== Personal life ===
She has two sons: Artyom (born 23 July 2011) and David (born 2016). Daria and Sergei had the wedding in 2010, since 2015 they have been living in a three-room apartment in Moscow. Daria is a godmother for Daniel Gusev, a son of Evgeniya Feofilaktova-Guseva, another Dom-2 participant. However, Daria and Evgeniya do not have relationships because of a serious conflict after Evgeniya’s leaving the reality show.

Daria’s hobbies are travelling the tropical countries, shopping and food cooking. She underwent several plastic surgery operations.

=== Business ===
Daria Pynzar has her family business: together with her husband she is a co-owner of Internet clothes shop and name boutique (opened in 2012). She had been an owner of two beauty salons till 2018, but because of the conflict with business partners she had to leave the salons.

== Sources ==
- Official website
