= Lyudmila Narusova =

Russian politician (born 1951)

- Людмила Нарусова
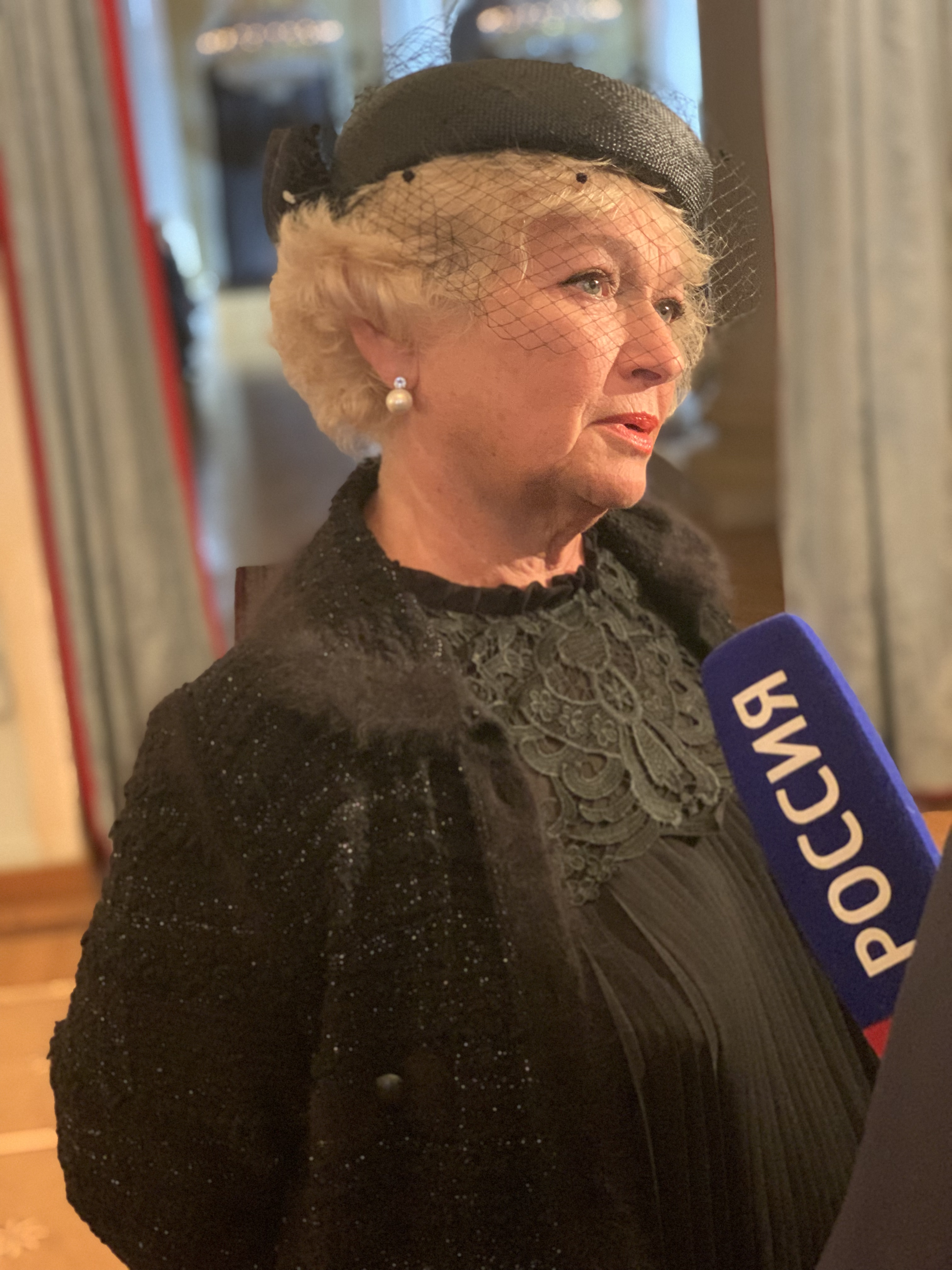
- Narusova in 2022

Russian Federation Senator from the Republic of Tuva
- Incumbent
- Assumed office 23 September 2016
- Preceded by: Mergen Oorzhak
- In office 16 October 2002 – 13 October 2010
- Preceded by: Chamyr Udumbara
- Succeeded by: Aleksey Pimanov

Russian Federation Senator from Bryansk Oblast
- In office 14 October 2010 – 22 October 2012
- Preceded by: Alexander Yurievich Petrov
- Succeeded by: Mikhail Marchenko

Member of the State Duma
- In office 17 January 1996 – 18 January 2000

Personal details
- Born: 2 May 1951 (age 75) Bryansk, Russian SFSR, Soviet Union
- Party: Our Home – Russia; Russian Party of Life
- Spouse: Anatoly Sobchak (m. 1980; died 2000)
- Children: Ksenia Sobchak (daughter)
- Education: Leningrad State University
- Profession: Professor
- Website: l-narusova.ru

Lyudmila Borisovna Narusova (Russian: Людмила Борисовна Нарусова; born 2 May 1951) is a Russian politician, a Russian Federation Senator, representing Tuva. From 2010 to 2012, she represented Bryansk Oblast in the Federation Council of Russia.

== Early life, education and early career ==
Narusova was born in Bryansk, Russian SFSR, Soviet Union, the daughter of a Russian mother and of Boris Narusovich, a Jewish platoon commander in the Red Army and a lieutenant of the Komsomol, who later was appointed the director of the School for the Deaf in Bryansk. In 1969–1974, she studied history at the Leningrad State University. Then, in 1977–1980, she studied history at the graduate school of the Institute of History of the Academy of Sciences of the Soviet Union and worked at the Leningrad State University. In 1980, she married Anatoly Sobchak. After obtaining a Ph.D. in history (Russian: кандидат наук), she taught history at the Saint Petersburg Academy of Culture.

== Political career ==
Narusova entered Russian politics when she was elected to the State Duma in 1995. She was a member of "Our Home – Russia" faction until 2006. Since 2000, Narusova became a host of TV-show "Freedom of speech" at St. Petersburg branch of RTR.

In October 2002, she was elected a member of the Federation Council of Russia from Tuva Republic. Since 2010, Narusova served as a senator from Bryansk Oblast, but she was dismissed by Nikolay Demin, a former governor of Bryansk Oblast. In 2016, she became a member of the Federation Council of Russia from Tuva Republic for a new term.

In 2013, Narusova was expelled from the Fair Russia party. However, she later claimed she had never formally been a member of a party.

Narusova did not vote in favour of the pension reform in 2018.

=== Criticism of invasion of Ukraine ===
In response to 2022 Russian invasion of Ukraine, Narusova on 27 February stated in a television interview: "I do not identify myself with those representatives of the state that speak out in favor of the war. I think they themselves do not know what they are doing. They are following orders without thinking." She also stated that Russian soldiers in Ukraine lay "unburied; wild, stray dogs gnawing on bodies that in some cases cannot be identified because they are burned." On 4 March, Narusova told the Federation Council, in livestreamed proceedings, of the heavy losses Russian forces were suffering in Ukraine. She claimed to know of a 100-strong Russian conscript company of whom "only four were left alive" when the unit was withdrawn. She criticized the censorship law about "discrediting" Russian Armed Forces and its operations. In 2023, she was the only one to abstain voting for electronic draft in the Russian army mobilization.

== Family ==
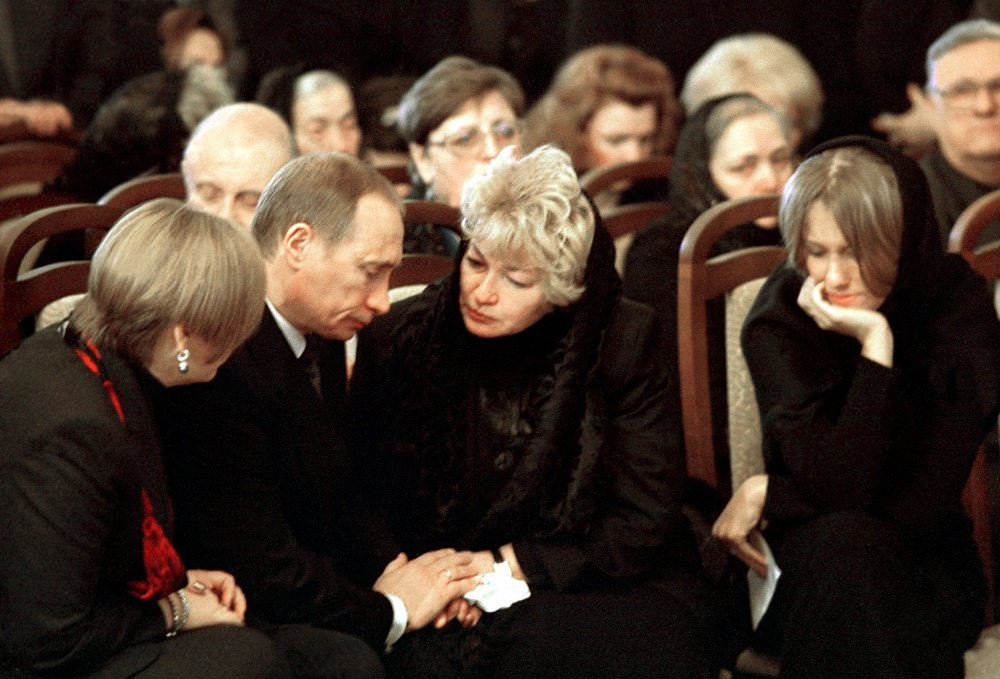
Narusova, Vladimir Putin and Ksenia Sobchak at the funeral of Anatoly Sobchak

Narusova is the widow of Anatoly Sobchak (1937–2000), who was a prominent Russian politician, mentor and teacher of both Vladimir Putin and Dmitry Medvedev, and the mother of Ksenia Sobchak (born 1981), who is widely known in Russia as a presenter on Dom-2 and other TV shows.

== Honours ==
- Medal "In Commemoration of the 850th Anniversary of Moscow"
- Medal "In Commemoration of the 300th Anniversary of Saint Petersburg"
