= Ksenia Sobchak =

Russian journalist and media manager (born 1981)

- Ксения Собчак
- Sobchak in 2026
- Born: Ksenia Anatolyevna Sobchak; 5 November 1981 (age 44); Leningrad, Russian SFSR, Soviet Union
- Citizenship: Soviet Union (until 1991); Russia (since 1991); Israel (since 2022)
- Education: Saint Petersburg State University (did not graduate); Moscow State Institute of International Relations
- Occupations: TV host; radio host; TV producer; media manager; journalist; YouTuber; entrepreneur; actress; politician; writer; restaurateur
- Employers: TNT (2004–2012); NTV (2005); Muz-TV (2006–2008, 2018); Channel One (2008–2009, 2020–2022); 5TV (2010); MTV (2012); Ukraine (2014); TV Rain (2012–2018); L'Officiel Russia (2015–2018); Super (2019–2021)
- Television: Dom-2; Last Hero
- Political party: Civic Initiative (2017–2023); Party of Changes (2018–2019)
- Spouses: Maksim Vitorgan (m. 2013; div. 2018); Konstantin Bogomolov (m. 2019)
- Partners: Umar Dzhabrailov (2001); Sergey Kapkov (2011); Ilya Yashin (2012)
- Children: 1
- Parents: Anatoly Sobchak (father); Lyudmila Narusova (mother)
- Ksenia Sobchak's voice recorded November 2012

Ksenia Anatolyevna Sobchak (Note: Also romanised as Kseniya) (Russian: Ксения Анатольевна Собчак, IPA: ['ksʲenʲɪjə ɐnɐ'tolʲjɪvnə sɐpˈt͜ɕak]; born 5 November 1981) is a Russian journalist, media manager, television personality, and former politician. She is the younger daughter of Anatoly Sobchak, the first democratically elected mayor of Saint Petersburg and one of Vladimir Putin's mentors, and Senator Lyudmila Narusova.

Sobchak became known to the wider public as the host of the TNT reality show Dom-2. She later became an anchor at the independent television channel TV Rain and served as editor-in-chief of L'Officiel Russia. Sobchak was the Civic Initiative's candidate for the 2018 Russian presidential election. From 2020 to 2021, she co-hosted the television talk show Dok-Tok with Alexander Gordon on Channel One. Currently, Sobchak leads her own independent media holding, Ostorozhno Media, which includes a network of popular Telegram channels and her YouTube journalism project "Ostorozhno: Sobchak".

Sobchak is the second daughter of the first democratically elected mayor of Saint Petersburg, Anatoly Sobchak, and Lyudmila Narusova, a Russian politician. Sobchak has described herself as being of part‑Jewish heritage. Sobchak also revealed that she and her family had experienced antisemitism.

As a child, Sobchak attended the ballet school attached to the Mariinsky Theatre. She also attended the Hermitage Museum art school. In 1998, Sobchak left the school attached to Herzen University and enrolled at Saint Petersburg State University (Department of International Relations). In 2001, Sobchak moved to Moscow and enrolled in the International Relations programme at the Moscow State Institute of International Relations.

On 31 October 2026, Latvia banned Ksenia Sobchak and her husband Konstantin Bogomolov from entering the country indefinitely.

== Entertainment career ==
=== Television ===
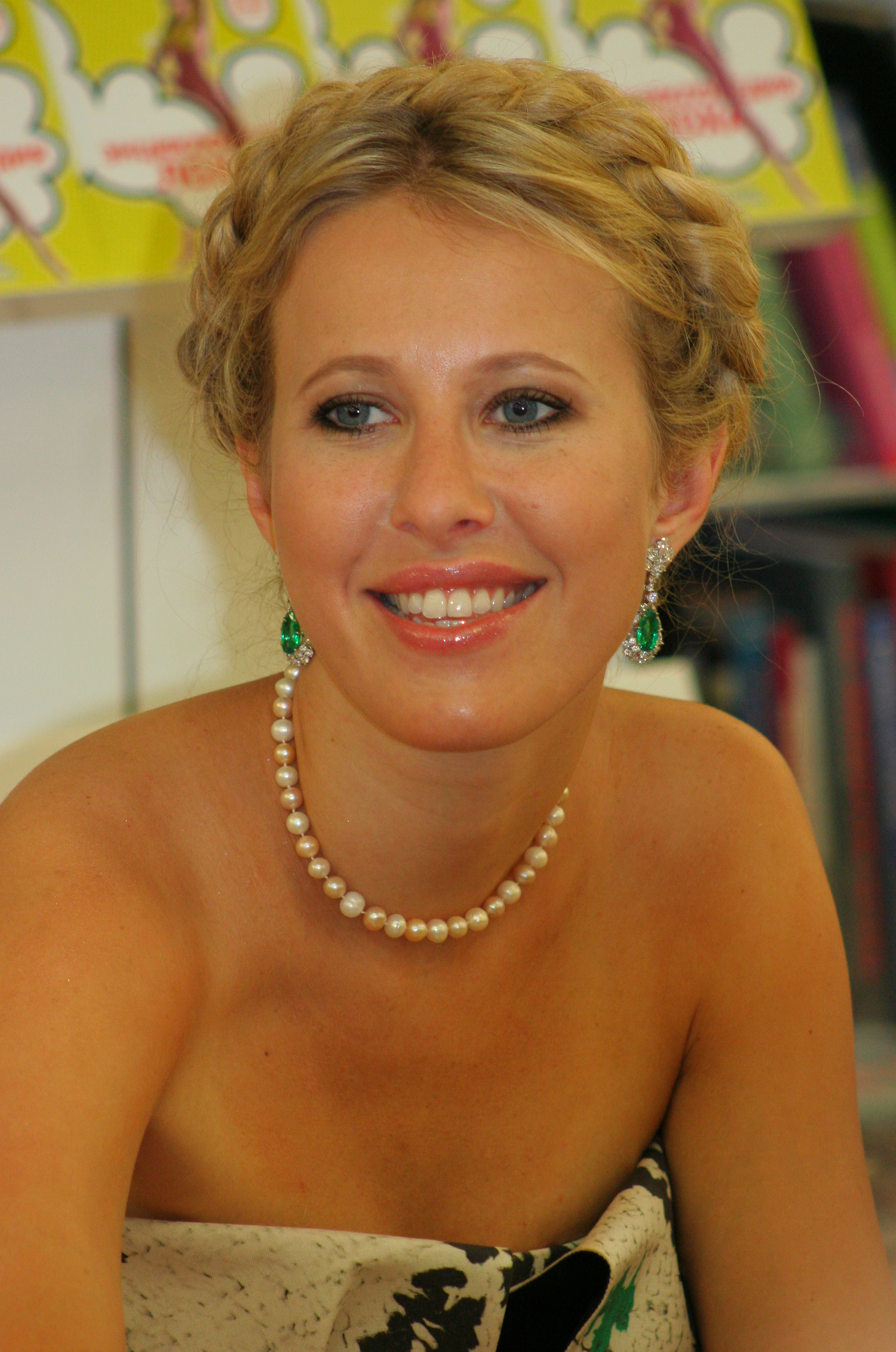
Sobchak in 2010, before her involvement in politics

Sobchak became famous in 2004 as a host of the reality show Dom-2. She left the show in 2012 because the show's lowbrow orientation had become incongruent with her political activism.

From 2008 to 2010, Sobchak was a host of the reality shows Who Does NOT Want to Be a Millionaire?, Last Hero‑6, Sweet Life of a Blonde, the Muz‑TV Awards, and Two Stars.

In 2010, Sobchak became a host of the television programme Freedom of Thought on the state‑run Channel 5. She soon left the programme because, according to her, it had turned into a never‑ending discussion of public utilities maintenance.

In 2011, Sobchak hosted the programme Sobchak Live on the independent channel TV Rain and became the host of Top Model po-russki on Muz-TV.

In 2012, she appeared in the television series Brief Guide To A Happy Life.

On 7 September 2012, MTV Russia launched a talk show, GosDep (State Department) with Ksenia Sobchak. The show aimed to cover hot social and political issues. The first episode, titled 'Where Is Putin Leading Us?', featured interviews with the head of Left Front, Sergei Udaltsov; a member of the 'Solidarnost' (Solidarity) movement, Ilya Yashin; and the eco‑activist Yevgeniya Chirikova. The show was cancelled after one episode. The second episode would have included an interview with the anti‑corruption blogger Alexei Navalny. MTV Russia representatives said the show was cancelled because of a lack of interest in politics among the channel's audience.

=== Film ===
Sobchak acted in the comedies Hitler Goes Kaput!, Rzhevsky Versus Napoleon, The Best Movie, and Entropiya. Sobchak also acted in the film Thieves and Prostitutes.

=== Music ===
In 2007, Sobchak recorded the song 'Dance with Me' (Потанцуй со мной) with the Russian rapper Timati, as well as a music video. Russian media at the time attributed a relationship between Sobchak and Timati.

=== Annual income ===
According to Forbes magazine, in 2021 Sobchak was the seventh highest‑paid celebrity in Russia. She has been ranked as high as fourth (in 2010) and as low as 15th (in 2016) among Russian celebrities. Her income in 2017 was approximately US$2.1 million. The main source of this annual revenue is advertising contracts.

=== Euroset ===
It was reported that Sobchak sold her ownership stake in Euroset for $2.3 million in December 2012.

=== Other ===
Around the time of her interview with Valērijs Kargins in Riga, she and Oksana Robski (Russian: Оксана Робски) released the perfume Married to a Millionaire (Russian: Zамуж за миллионера).

On 28 December 2008, Sobchak was on an Aeroflot flight from Moscow to New York City when she and other passengers determined that the pilot was drunk before take‑off. Sobchak phoned Aeroflot, who replaced the flight deck crew.

In 2009, Russia's Tatler magazine included her on its list of the most desirable single women in the country. The list was based on women's fortune and celebrity status. She is known across Russia as a socialite, TV host, and presenter. Sobchak was Russia's No. 1 'it girl', an analogue of Paris Hilton.

Sobchak served as editor‑in‑chief of L'Officiel Russia from 2015 to 2018.

== Political background and activities ==
=== Background ===
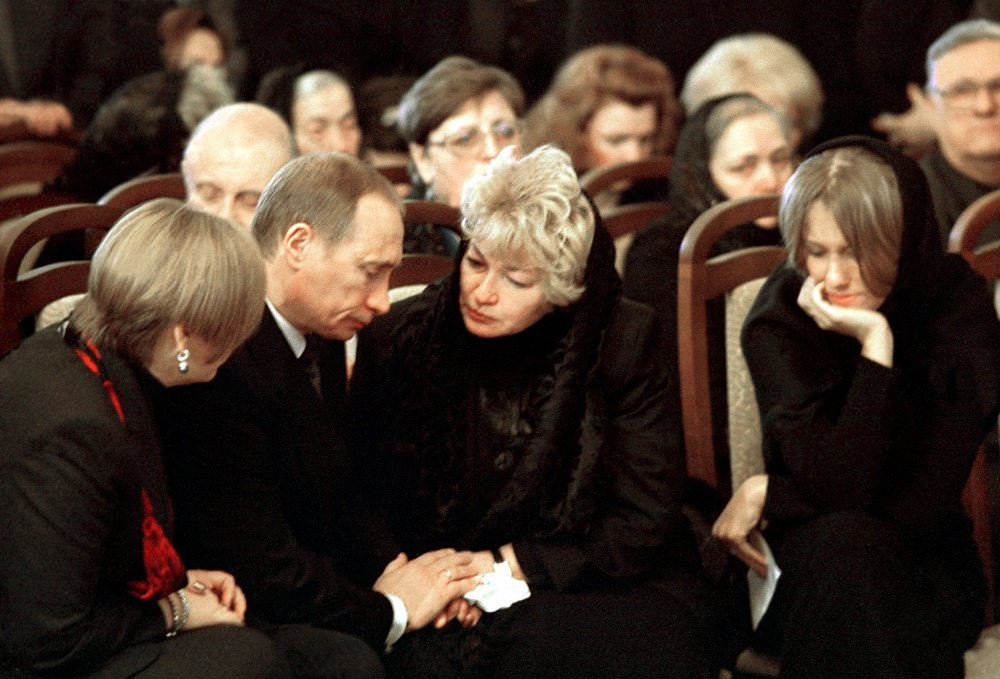
Lyudmila Putina, Vladimir Putin, Lyudmila Narusova, and Ksenia Sobchak (left to right) at the funeral of her father, who was Putin's former mentor, Anatoly Sobchak, in 2000

Sobchak's father, Anatoly, had been both Vladimir Putin's and Dmitry Medvedev's law professor at Leningrad State University. He built a particularly close relationship with Putin, and in 1991 Anatoly helped launch Putin's career in politics when he was the mayor of Saint Petersburg. Putin later helped Anatoly flee Russia when he was wanted on corruption charges. According to the Moscow News, "Putin's reported affection for the Sobchak family is widely believed to give Ksenia Sobchak a protected status, which may also explain her boldness" – such as her encounter in October 2011 with Vasily Yakemenko, the controversial leader of the pro‑Kremlin Nashi youth movement, when she reprimanded him for eating at an expensive restaurant in Moscow and published a video of the encounter on the internet.

=== "Everyone is Free!" ===
At the end of March 2006, Sobchak rented a two‑storey mansion at 16 Arbat Street and convened a press conference to announce the creation of the youth movement 'Everyone is Free!' According to the television presenter, she was prompted to take this step by numerous letters in which fans of her work on Dom-2 shared their problems and experiences. Sobchak felt that political positions and opposition served only as a pretext for realising her ambitions and declared her movement non‑political, aimed at providing help and support to young people. Sobchak promised to fund 'Everyone is Free!' from her personal funds. The rented building on Arbat was hastily renovated and decorated in the movement's 'signature' colour of blue denim; it housed the movement's headquarters and a reception area for those wishing to join. The Izvestia newspaper conducted an online survey in which, after the press conference, users were asked about their desire to join Sobchak's movement. The results showed a lack of enthusiasm: of 2,133 respondents, only 6% expressed a desire to join for political reasons or sympathy for the leader, and 38% admitted that they did not know who Ksenia Sobchak was. After the first press conference, Sobchak stopped communicating with journalists for a month. On 7 July, she avoided participating in a debate with the leader of the youth branch of the Rodina party, Sergey Shargunov, at the Club on Brestskaya, which caused dissatisfaction among the youth politicians and journalists who attended the event.

On 12 June, 'Everyone is Free!' declared itself with a street action dedicated to improving the square around the monument to Sergei Yesenin on Tverskoy Boulevard. Participants in the movement collected rubbish, painted benches and playgrounds on the boulevard, and Sobchak herself, in the presence of journalists and onlookers, wiped off a yellow bikini with a red heart drawn by an unknown vandal from the crotch of the Yesenin monument. According to local residents, on the morning of that day, there was no paint on the monument, and it appeared only before the event. The action ended with a small concert and fashion show on a stage near the monument. In early July, a 'club day' was held at the movement's headquarters. Sobchak made policy statements and issued club cards to the most active participants, providing free access to nightclubs, discounts, and other privileges. During the meeting, Sobchak gave a presentation on the goals and moral guidelines of the movement, in which two slides were occupied by the declared sponsors: Microsoft, Coca‑Cola, Russian Standard Bank, the Renaissance Capital investment bank, Lukoil, MegaFon, the Bilingua café‑club, and other companies. 'Club day' ended with a debate between the writers Oksana Robski and Sergey Minaev.

At first, the movement was the cause of gossip in political circles: experts and young politicians tried to understand Sobchak's motivations. The political scientist and contemporary art collector Marat Gelman suggested that Sobchak might have set her sights on a political career in United Russia and was gathering her supporters ahead of the 2007 Russian legislative election. The head of Yabloko Youth, Ilya Yashin, doubted Sobchak's independence and shared with journalists his opinion that 'Everyone is Free!' could have been created to criticise the opposition with the approval of the Presidential Administration. The leader of the pro‑Kremlin Nashi movement, Vasily Yakemenko, doubted the Kremlin's involvement in the creation of the 'Everyone is Free!' movement: in his opinion, Sobchak could both be useful to the Presidential Administration and discredit the Russian authorities. Subsequently, the movement ceased any activity, and journalists mentioned Sobchak as the head of 'Everyone is Free!' only once – in the context of discussing the elections to the Legislative Assembly of Saint Petersburg of the fourth convocation, which it considered fictitious, and the construction of the Okhta Centre skyscraper for Gazprom on the right bank of the Neva opposite the Smolny Cathedral.

=== Russian presidential election, 2018 ===
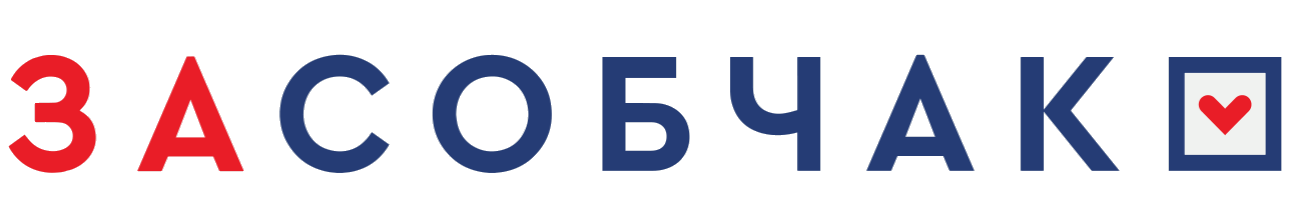
Sobchak 2018 logo

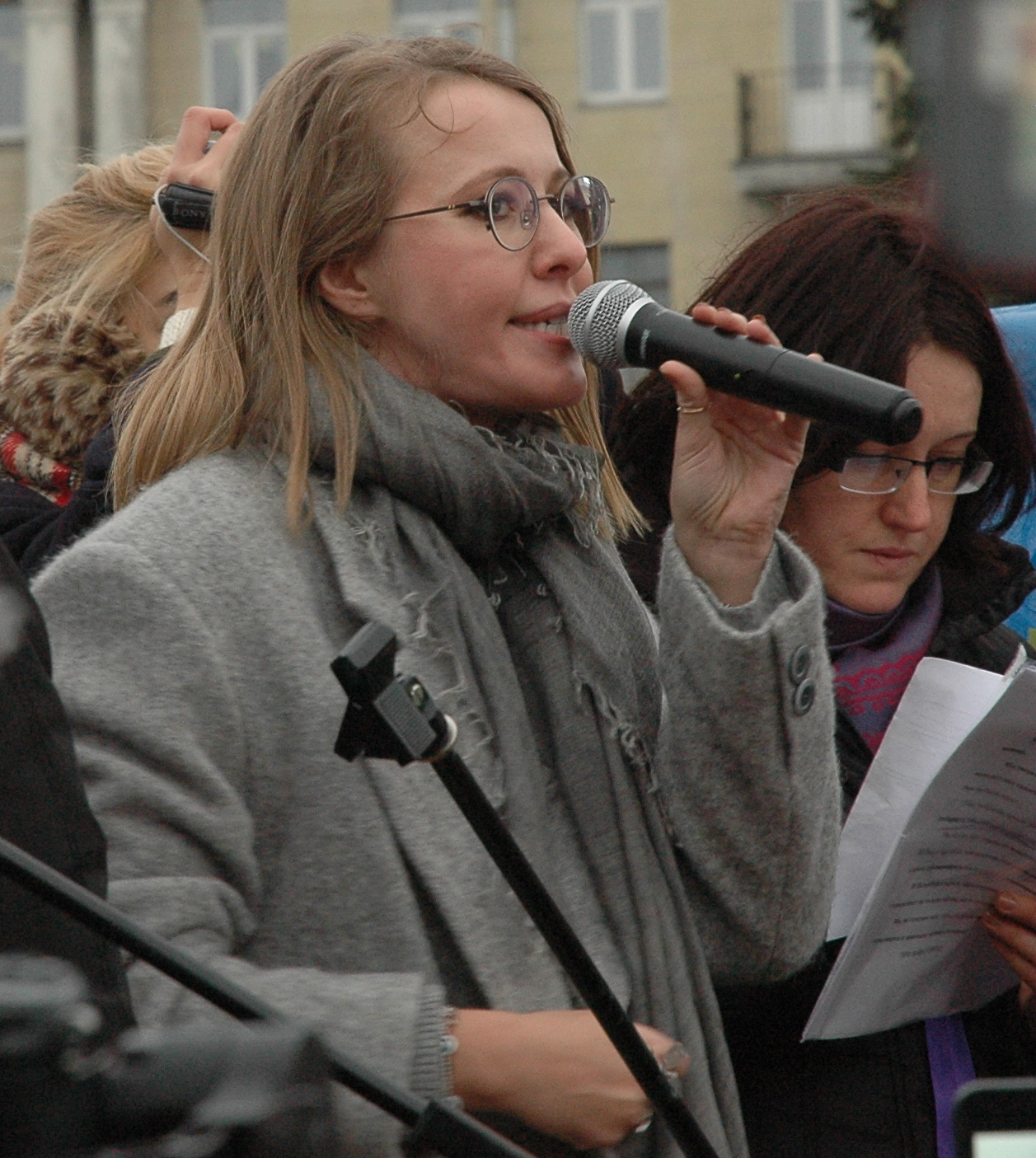
Sobchak during the presidential election campaign

In September 2017, before she announced her intention to run, Putin said of Sobchak's presidential intentions at a press conference during the 9th BRICS summit: "Every person has the right to nominate himself in accordance with the law. And Ksenia Sobchak is no exception here. I respect her father Anatoly Sobchak; I believe that he was an outstanding figure in contemporary Russian history. I am saying this without a trace of irony. He was very decent and played a big role in my own destiny. But when it comes to running for the presidency, matters of a personal nature cannot play any significant role. It depends on what programme she is offering, if she actually runs, and how she builds her presidential campaign."

Sobchak declared her candidacy for the 2018 Russian presidential election on 18 October 2017. Before announcing her intention to enter the presidential race in 2018, Sobchak discussed her intention personally with Putin. She said: "With Vladimir Vladimirovich, my family has been associated a great deal … so I felt it right to say that I had made such a decision." Putin, she said, told her that "every person has the right to make their own decisions and must be responsible for them".

Sobchak was the Civic Initiative's candidate for the 2018 Russian presidential election.

Some sceptics accused Sobchak of being a spoiler candidate intended to undermine Alexei Navalny; every recent presidential election has featured a prominent liberal candidate handpicked by the Kremlin. Other sceptics suspect that Sobchak's candidacy is mostly about building her brand. Sobchak did not believe she could win against Putin in 2018, but stated that she was in it for the long haul: "Of course I want to be president. I want to win, but I also want to be sincere. In a system created by Putin, it is only possible for Putin to win. I am realistic about who will become president."

On 15 March 2018, Sobchak and Dmitry Gudkov announced the creation of a new party, called the Party of Changes, based on the Civic Initiative party. The aim of the party was to "return our freedom and your freedom". Sobchak won 1.68% of the vote in the 2018 presidential election.

=== Flight from Russia ===
On 26 October 2022, Russian media reported that Sobchak would be detained as part of an investigation into the alleged extortion of 11 million roubles from the head of Rostec, Sergei Chemezov, by Sobchak's director, Kirill Sukhanov. Lithuanian authorities confirmed that Sobchak had entered Lithuania and was entitled to stay for 90 days without a visa because she was an Israeli citizen. The raid came after the arrest of Kirill Sukhanov, a commercial director at Sobchak's media group, 'Ostorozhno, Media', for alleged extortion, with Sobchak reportedly being a suspect in the case. Lithuanian border officials said that Sobchak had arrived on an Israeli passport, while Sobchak called the case an attack on her editorial team. Then, days after she fled the country, she returned to Russia, according to state media.

== Ostorozhno Media holding ==
In 2019, Sobchak expanded her independent digital presence by launching the YouTube interview and documentary channel Careful, Sobchak! (Russian: Осторожно, Собчак!). The success of the channel led to the gradual formation of a larger independent media holding company named Ostorozhno Media (styled as Осторожно Media). The holding encompasses a wide network of digital projects across various platforms, focusing on news reporting, social documentaries, lifestyle journalism, and podcasts. As of the mid-2020s, the key components of Ostorozhno Media include:

- Ostorozhno, Novosti (Careful, News) – A major breaking news Telegram channel with over 1.5 million subscribers, which also operates a mirrored community on the VK social network.
- Bloody Lady (Russian: Кровавая барыня) – Sobchak’s personal public socio-political Telegram channel, commanding an audience of more than 1.1 million subscribers.
- Regional News Network – A branch of regional digital outlets focusing on local journalism, including Ostorozhno, Moskva (launched for the Moscow region) and Ostorozhno, Peterburg (launched in March 2026 to cover Saint Petersburg).

=== 2026 data leak and censorship allegations ===
On July 9, 2026, the hacker group Black Mirror and the anonymous project VChK-OGPU published a large archive, claiming to possess over 350 gigabytes of Sobchak's personal and corporate correspondence spanning from 2015 to 2026. The leaks allegedly contained text and voice messages detailing editorial censorship and hidden financial and political agreements between Sobchak's media empire and various Russian officials, including the Moscow Mayor's Office and the Presidential Administration.

Among the disclosures were documents showing that her news channel, Ostorozhno, Novosti, deliberately minimized coverage of drone strikes on Russian oil refineries and public grievances regarding fuel shortages to comply with shifting Kremlin-backed censorship rules. The leaked logs also detailed backchannel communication with Alexey Nemeryuk (First Deputy Chief of Staff of the Moscow Mayor), Vladimir Tabak (head of the state-backed ANO Dialog), and Sergey Novikov (head of the Kremlin's Presidential Directorate for Social Projects), concerning the informal coordination and official approval of her media and public projects. Despite this, Sobchak continued to maintain that the entire leak had been fabricated by the hackers.

== Political views ==
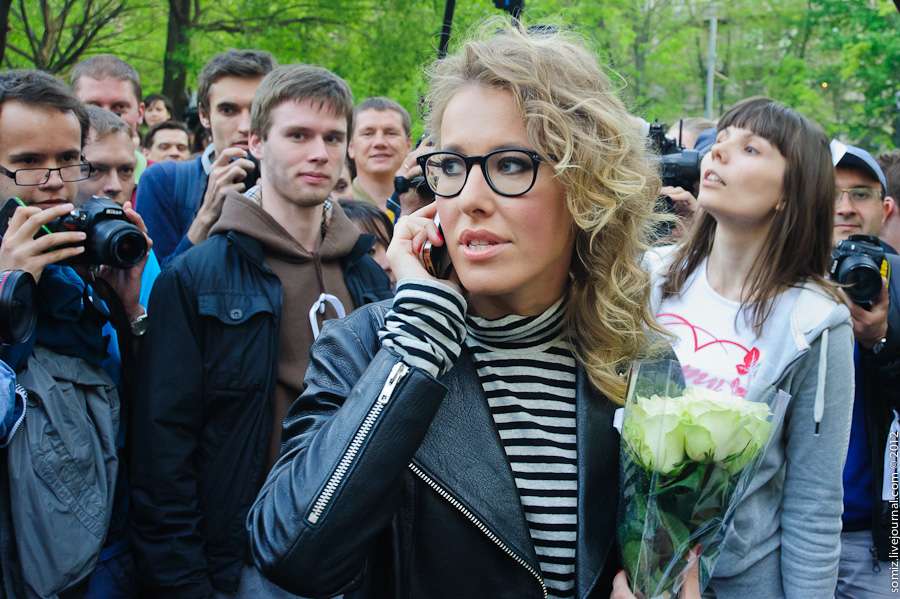
Sobchak at a demonstration in Moscow in May 2012

In 2012, Sobchak was critical of Putin's political policies. Although she stated that she had "happily" voted for Putin when she was younger, she would not do so any longer. In the 2012 Russian presidential election, Sobchak says she voted for Mikhail Prokhorov.

After the parliament elections held on 4 December 2011, which are known for the large number of alleged fraud reports, Sobchak joined the protest rallies held in Russia as a response to the alleged electoral frauds. She also took part in the campaign against Putin's re-election, working as an observer during the presidential elections held on 4 March 2012. She was one of the Russian protest participants targeted by the Investigative Committee of Russia on 12 June 2012, when her apartment in Moscow was entered and searched.

=== Economic views ===
Outlining her economic views, she writes:

Russia is a country of a free economy with a strong state sector. All large state corporations should be privatized with antitrust restrictions. The state should not control any sectors of the economy, the state's share in enterprises and industries should be limited to breaking up monopolies. Private property should be protected by law, the review of any ownership and nationalization are possible only on a reimbursable basis on the basis of independent market valuations. Reform of tax and regulatory legislation and practices should stimulate the development of private entrepreneurship, small and medium-sized businesses, technological and innovative development of enterprises, education. The list of licensed branches of the economy should be significantly reduced.

=== Views on feminism ===
In her 2017 manifesto, she criticised the lack of women's representation in industry and politics.

Almost 500 heavy professions in Russia are officially closed to women. But among all the others – the salary of a woman is almost 30% less than that of a man. Among the most important companies in the country, women head only about 5%. ... In any case, half the country's population deserves a female voice for the first time in 14 years in these allegedly male games.

=== On the status of Crimea ===
Ksenia Sobchak is of the opinion that, having annexed Crimea from Ukraine in 2014, Russia violated the 1994 Budapest Memorandum; she claimed on 24 October 2017 that "Under these agreements, we agreed that Crimea is Ukrainian, which is the most important for me". Sobchak stressed that she did not consider the issue with Crimea resolved. "I believe that these things need to be discussed, it is very important to discuss them ... look for some ways out." She also added that "the most important thing that Russia and Ukraine should do now is to restore our friendship at any cost." Simultaneously she suggested to hold a new referendum on the status of Crimea after "a broad and equal campaign." In December 2017, Sobchak claimed that an unconditional withdrawal of Russia from Crimea would lead to a civil war in Russia.

=== Other views ===
Sobchak has said that if she becomes president, she will remove the body of Vladimir Lenin from Red Square, since, in her opinion, this is an indicator of a "medieval way of life in the country... so the corpse of Lenin must be removed from Red Square."

In her interview with Julia Volkova in 2021, Sobchak voiced her support for LGBT rights in Russia, stating that she disagrees with the country's controversial "gay propaganda law". On 24 February 2022, Sobchak voiced opposition to the Russian invasion of Ukraine, writing that "We the Russians will be dealing with the consequences of today for many more years".

== Personal life ==
On 1 February 2013, Sobchak married actor Maksim Vitorgan (born 10 September 1972 in Moscow, RSFSR, USSR). Together they have a son named Platon, born 18 November 2016. They divorced in 2018. Sobchak married theatre director Konstantin Bogomolov on 13 September 2019. They arrived to their wedding ceremony in a hearse.

In 2015, Sobchak said that if there was ever the possibility of political persecution against her, she had thought about emigration or getting an Israeli passport, but would prefer the United States where she could find a Russian-speaking community:

I'm a very big patriot. I really love my job, the city, my friends. And if tomorrow is war, then the place for emigration will have to be a Russian-speaking place. I have to work in Russian.

In April 2022, she received Israeli citizenship.

On 15 July 2023, TASS said that seven people were arrested in connection with a plot to kill Sobchak and Margarita Simonyan, the chief editor of RT.

== Notes ==
Media offices
| Preceded by Ksenia Gorbacheva | Editor-in-Chief of L'Officiel Russia; 2015–2018 | Succeeded by Edward Dorozhkin |
