= Anatoly Sobchak =

Russian politician (1937–2000)

- Анатолий Собчак
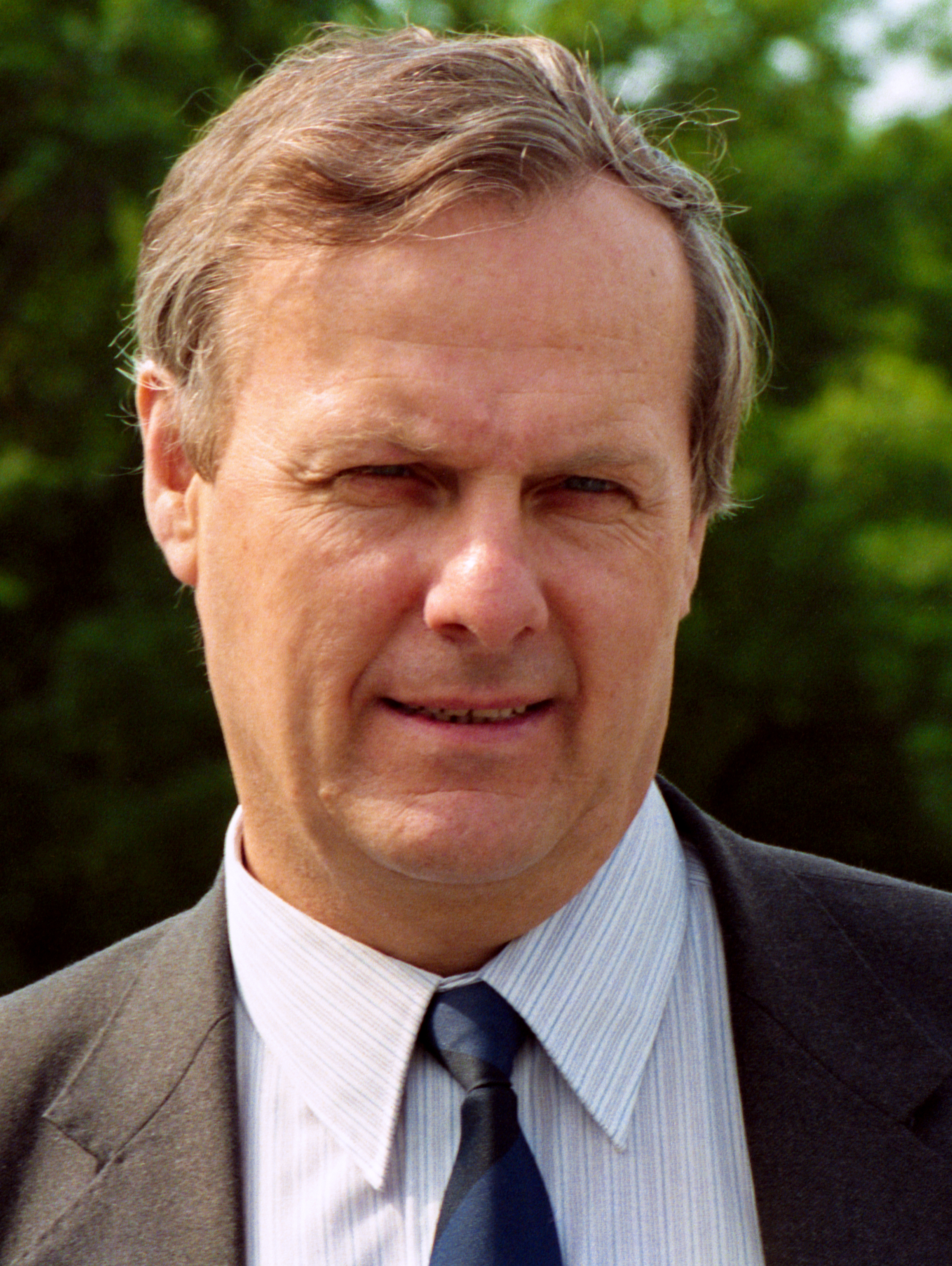
- Sobchak in 1990

Mayor of Saint Petersburg
- In office 12 June 1991 – 5 June 1996
- Preceded by: Alexander Shchelkanov (as Chairman of the Lensovet Executive Committee)
- Succeeded by: Vladimir Yakovlev (as Governor of Saint Petersburg)

Member of the Congress of People's Deputies
- In office 25 May 1989 – 12 June 1991

Personal details
- Born: 10 August 1937 Chita, Russian SFSR, Soviet Union
- Died: 19 February 2000 (aged 62) Svetlogorsk, Kaliningrad Oblast, Russia
- Resting place: Nikolskoe Cemetery, Saint Petersburg, Russia
- Party: Communist Party of the Soviet Union (1988–1990); Russian Democratic Reform Movement (1991–1994); Independent (1994–1996); Our Home – Russia (1996–2000)
- Spouses: Nonna Gandzyuk (m. 1958, divorced) Lyudmila Narusova (m. 1980)
- Children: Maria, Ksenia
- Education: Andrei Zhdanov Leningrad State University
- Profession: Legal scholar, educator
- Awards: Jubilee Medal "300 Years of the Russian Navy"; Olympic Order; Letter of Gratitude from the President of Russia; Order of Holy Prince Daniel of Moscow

Anatoly Aleksandrovich Sobchak (Russian: Анатолий Александрович Собчак, IPA: [ɐnɐˈtolʲɪj ɐlʲɪˈksandrəvʲɪtɕ sɐpˈtɕak]; 10 August 1937 – 19 February 2000) was a Russian politician and legal scholar, a co-author of the Constitution of the Russian Federation, and the first democratically elected mayor of Saint Petersburg.

== Biography ==
=== Soviet legal scholar ===
Anatoly Sobchak was born in Chita, Russian SFSR, Soviet Union, on 10 August 1937. His father, Aleksander Antonovich, was a railroad engineer of Polish and Czech origin, and his mother, Nadezhda Andreyevna Litvinova, was an accountant of Russian and Ukrainian origin. Anatoly was one of four brothers. In 1939, the family moved to Uzbekistan, where Anatoly lived until 1953 before entering Stavropol Law College. In 1954, he transferred to Leningrad State University. In 1958, he married Nonna Gandzyuk, a student of Herzen Teacher's College. They had a daughter called Maria Sobchak, born in 1965, who is currently a St. Petersburg lawyer, while her son Gleb Sobchak, born in 1983, graduated from the Law Faculty of St. Petersburg State University.

After graduating from Leningrad State University, he worked for three years as a lawyer in Stavropol, then returned to Leningrad State University for graduate studies (1962–1965). After obtaining his Candidate of Sciences (Ph.D. equal) degree, he taught law at the Leningrad Police School and the Leningrad Institute for Cellulose and Paper Industries' Technology (1965–1973), and between 1973 and 1990 he taught at the Leningrad State University Faculty of Law. In 1980, he married Lyudmila Narusova, at that time a history student at the Leningrad Academy of Soviet Culture and later a prominent MP. They had a daughter, Ksenia Sobchak.

After obtaining his Doctor of Sciences (habilitation) degree in 1982, he was appointed Professor and Head of the Department of Commercial Law in Socialist Economics. He was very popular among law students, especially for his mildly anti-government comments. During his work at Leningrad State University, he met Vladimir Putin.

=== Legislator ===
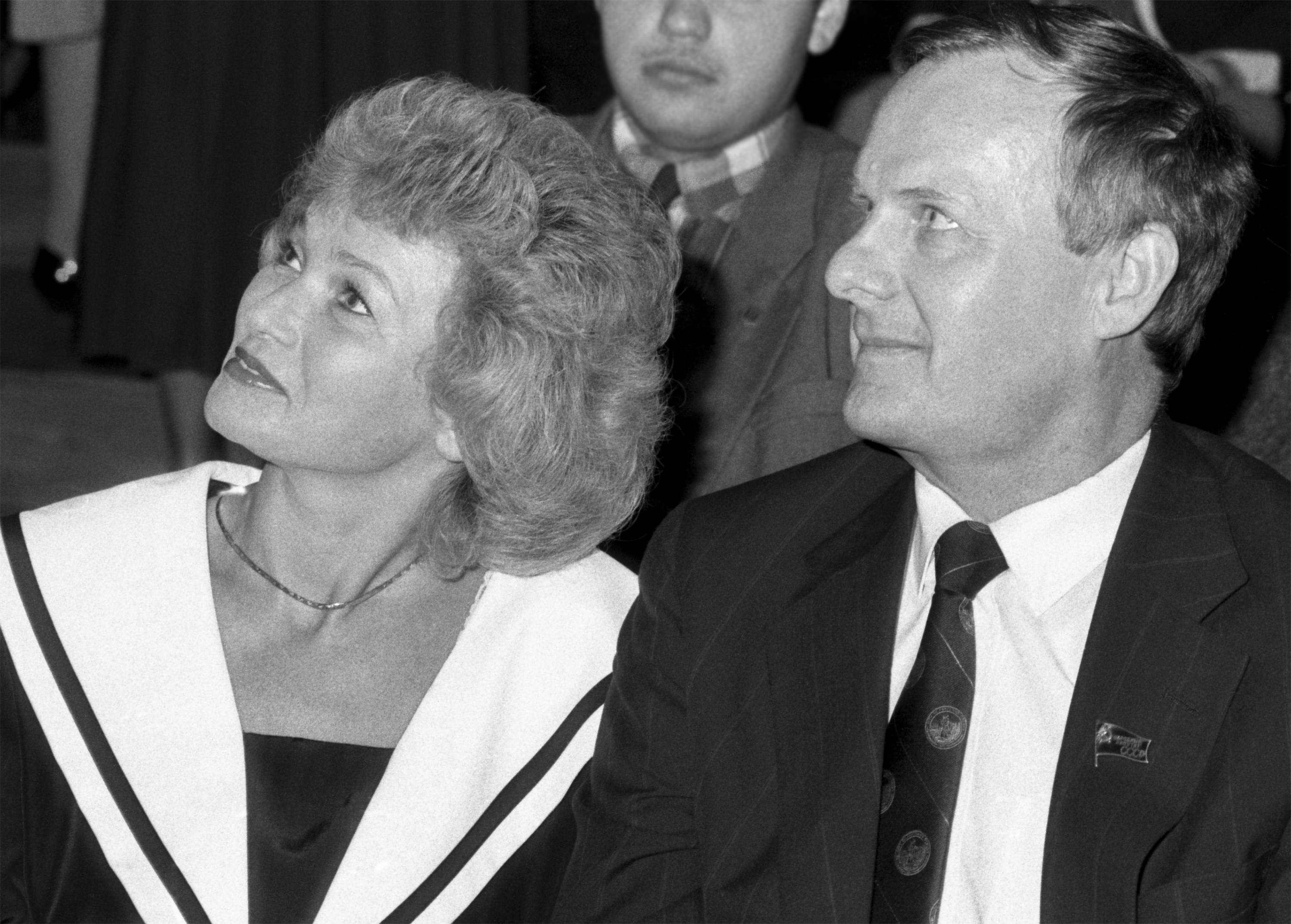
Sobchak with his wife Lyudmila Narusova in 1990

In 1989, after election laws changed during Perestroika, he was elected as an independent candidate to the Congress of People's Deputies of the Soviet Union. He was one of only a few deputies who had a legal background, so he contributed enormously to most of the laws created from 1989 to 1991. He became one of the founders and a co-chairman of the Inter-Regional Deputies Group along with Andrei Sakharov and Boris Yeltsin. He also was a chairman of the Parliamentary Commission on the Investigation of the events of 9 April 1989 in Tbilisi. The Commission condemned the military, which was blamed for many deaths when dispersing demonstrators. The Commission's report made it more difficult to use military force against civil demonstrations in the Soviet Union and Russia.

He was a member of the President's Consultative Council during Mikhail Gorbachev's tenure and contributed to legislation that originated from the presidential administration.

After the Soviet Union was dissolved in 1991, Sobchak was not a member of the central Parliament but was a member of Yeltsin's Presidential Council and the chairman of the Constitutional Assembly that prepared the Constitution of the Russian Federation in 1993. The constitution is often informally called Sobchak's constitution, although its real authors have been somewhat less known.

=== Mayor of Saint Petersburg ===
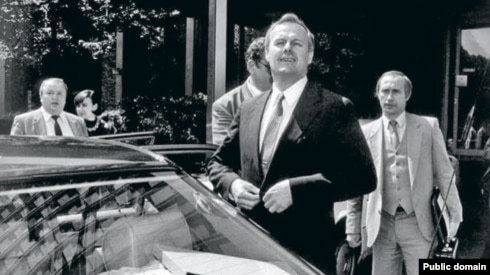
Mayor Anatoly Sobchak with his assistant Vladimir Putin in 1992

In April 1990, Sobchak was elected a deputy of the Leningrad City Council, and in May he became the chairman of the Council. From the beginning, his leadership was marked by a strongly authoritarian bent. The Council decided to change the structure of the city governance so as to have a Mayor elected by direct elections. The first of such elections in June 1991 were combined with the referendum on the city name. Sobchak won the elections, and the city voted to return to its historical name of Saint Petersburg. The name change was established in one of the last sessions of the Congress of People's Deputies of the Soviet Union, held on 12 September 1991. The change needed an amendment of the Constitution of the Soviet Union and its passage required much effort by Sobchak.

During his tenure, a Kissinger-Sobchak commission was formed in order to attract western investment into St. Petersburg. According to Putin who had met with Kissinger a couple of times, when Kissinger stated that the Soviet Union had pulled out of Eastern Europe too quickly under Gorbachev and that Kissinger was being blamed but Kissinger had thought it was impossible, Putin had agreed with Kissinger because so many problems would have been avoided if the pullout had not been so hasty.

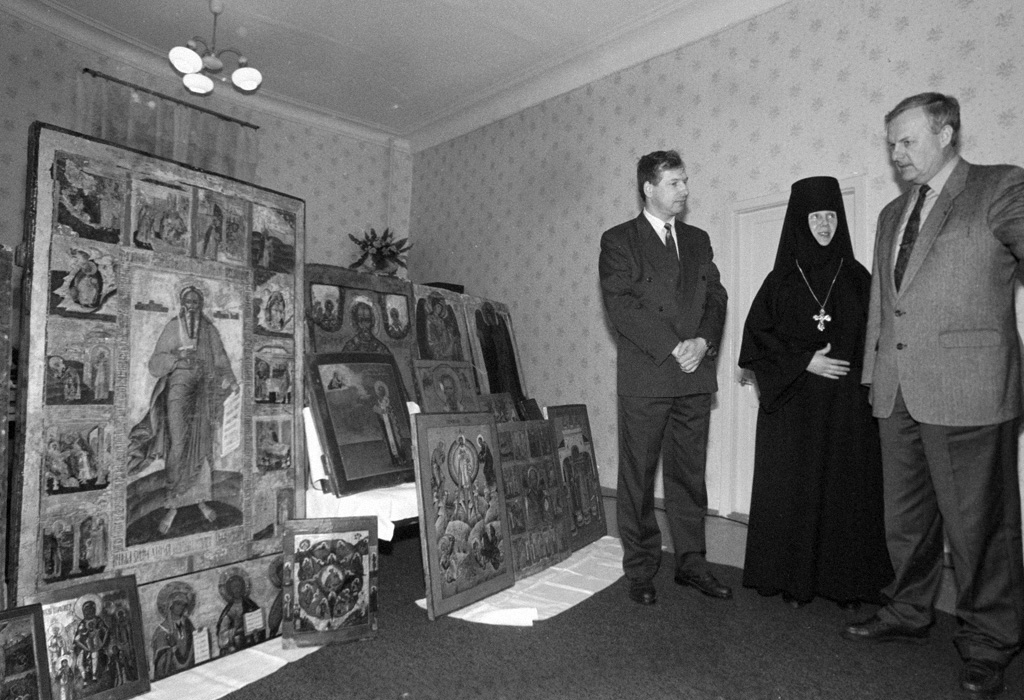
Anatoly Sobchak and Viktor Cherkesov, director of Federal Security Service Saint Petersburg Directorate, present icons confiscated from smugglers to Mother-Superior Serafima of Ioannovsky Convent

A deputy of the Saint Petersburg Legislative Assembly Yury Shutov, claimed that Vladimir Putin got hold of a file with compromising KGB materials on Sobchak at the time when Putin worked as the KGB's overseer at Leningrad State University. Putin used this materials to blackmail Sobchak and secure his own appointment in the city administration, according to Shutov.

Sobchak was Mayor of Saint Petersburg from 1991 to 1996. During his tenure, the city became a place of glamorous cultural and sporting events. Most of the everyday control of the city structure was handled by two Mayor's deputies – Vladimir Yakovlev and Vladimir Putin; critics alleged deterioration of city infrastructure, growing corruption, and crime during this time. In the 1996 mayoral election, Sobchak was opposed by his former first deputy Vladimir Yakovlev and lost by a margin of 1.2%. The major pitch of Yakovlev's campaign was that Sobchak's patronage of the arts (with city money) and involvement in federal politics prevented him from solving the real problems of the city.

=== Emigration and return ===
In 1997, a criminal investigation started against Sobchak. He was accused of irregularities in the privatization of his own apartment, his elder daughter's apartment, and his wife's art studio. By the standards of the 1990s in Russia, the allegations were relatively minor (although the alleged losses for city finances were still in the tens of thousands of dollars). Thus, Sobchak's supporters saw the criminal proceedings as a political repression. According to Ksenia Sobchak, this campaign was started in 1995 from Moscow to prevent her father from running in future presidential elections.

On 7 November 1997, Sobchak flew to Paris on a private plane without passport processing on the Russian side. The formal reason for his departure was medical treatment in a Paris hospital for his heart condition, but Sobchak never checked in at the hospital. Between 1997 and 1999, he lived the typical life of a political émigré in Paris.

In June 1999, his friend Vladimir Putin became much stronger politically (in a few weeks he became the Prime Minister of Russia), and he was able to make the prosecutors drop the charges against Sobchak. On 12 June 1999, Sobchak returned to Russia. After his return, Sobchak became a very active supporter of Putin in his quest for the Russian presidency.

=== Death ===
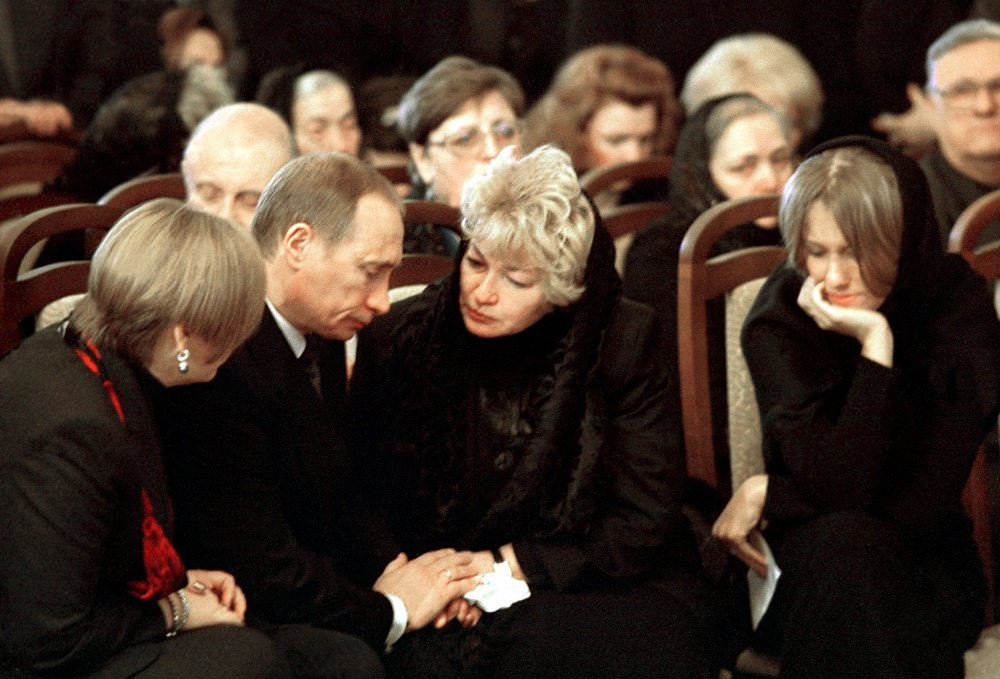
Sobchak's wife Lyudmila Narusova (centre), daughter Ksenia Sobchak (far right), and Vladimir Putin at his funeral

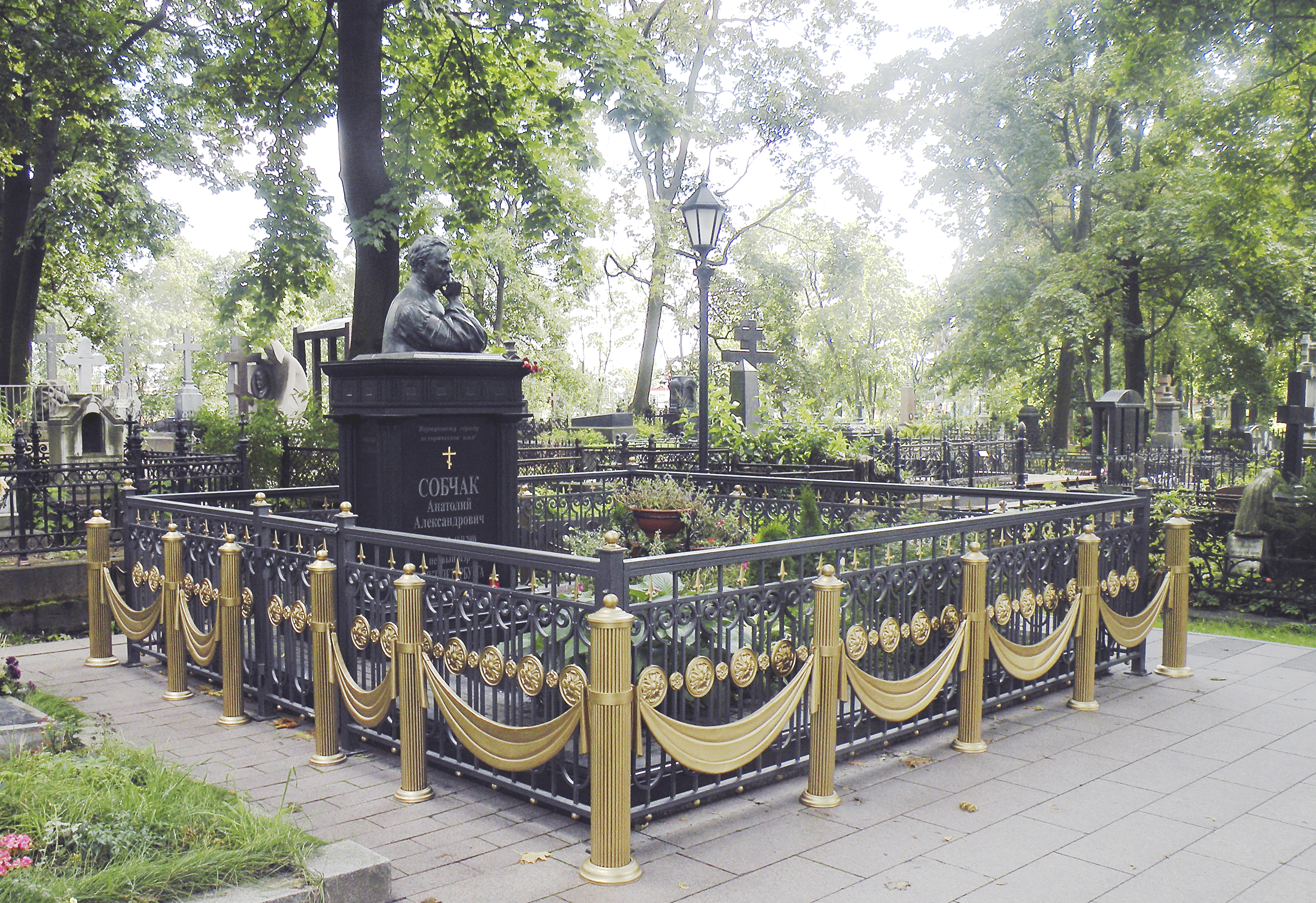
Sobchak's grave at the Nikolskoe Cemetery

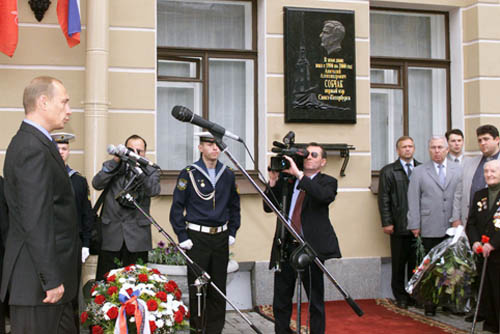
Vladimir Putin at the ceremony of unveiling of a memorial plaque for Anatoly Sobchak in St. Petersburg

On 17 February 2000, Putin met with Sobchak and urged him to travel to Kaliningrad to support his election campaign. Sobchak travelled there, accompanied by two assistants who also served as his bodyguards. (Note: Baltic-Escort (Russian: «Балтик-Экскорт»), a company headed by Roman Tsepov, provided bodyguards for St Petersburg officials including Sobchak and Vladimir Putin. Baltic-Escort provided bodyguards for not only Anatoly but also his wife Lyudmila Narusova and daughter Ksenia Sobchak. Viktor Zolotov had been Sobchak's bodyguard while he was mayor of St. Petersburg.) On 19 February 2000, Sobchak died suddenly in the town of Svetlogorsk in Kaliningrad Oblast. The initial suspected cause of death was a heart attack, but the findings of two medical experts were contradictory. A criminal investigation of Sobchak's death as a possible "premeditated murder with aggravating circumstances" was opened only on 6 May 2000, more than two months later. After three months, the investigation was closed without a finding. The Democratic Union party led by Valeria Novodvorskaya made an official statement that not only Sobchak, but also two of his aides had heart attacks simultaneously, which indicated poisoning. Two other men were present with Sobchak during his death, but their names were not publicly disclosed.

According to an independent investigation by Arkady Vaksberg, both bodyguards of Sobchak were treated for symptoms of poisoning after Sobchak's death, indicating a probable contract killing by poisoning. Sobchak's widow Lyudmila had her own autopsy done on her husband's body, but never made the results public; she told the BBC that she keeps the findings in a secure location outside Russia.

He was interred in Nikolskoe Cemetery at the Alexander Nevsky Monastery in St. Petersburg, near the grave of Galina Starovoitova.

== Honours and awards ==
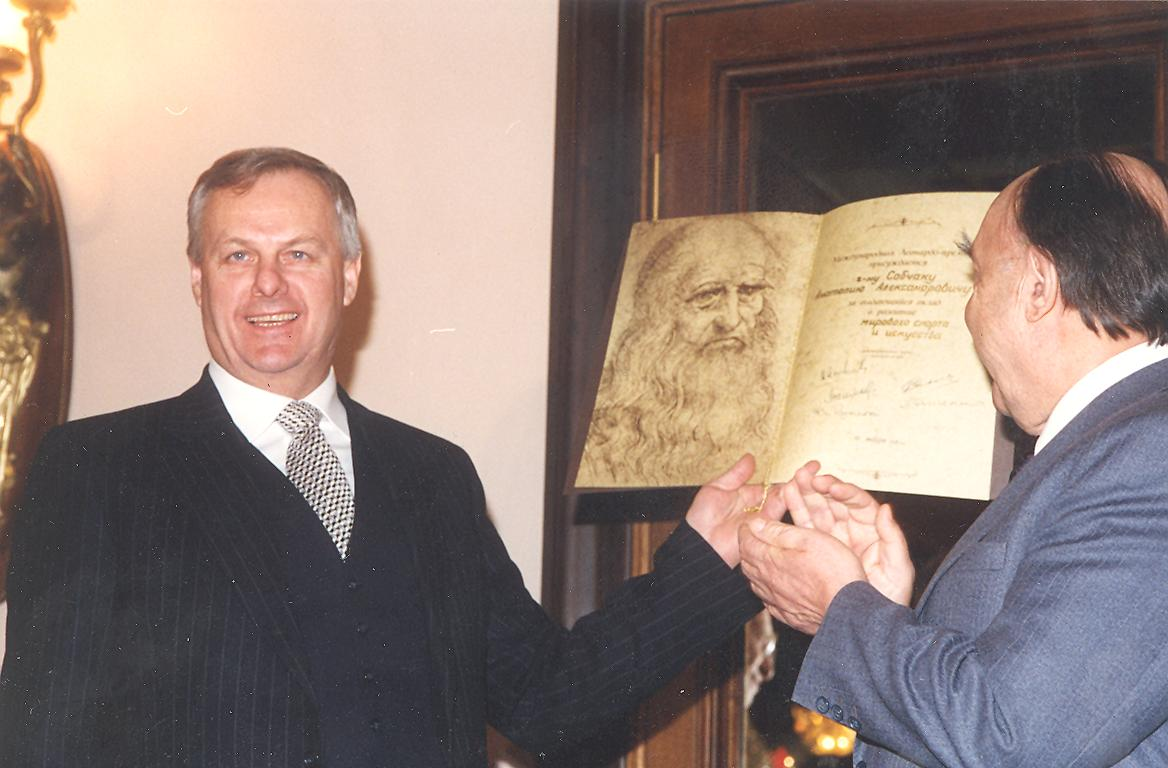
Anatoly Sobchak receiving the International Leonardo Prize, 1996

- Jubilee Medal "300 Years of the Russian Navy" (1996)
- Order of Holy Prince Daniel of Moscow, 1st class
- Silver medal of the International Olympic Committee (1995)
- Honorary citizen of St. Petersburg (2010, posthumous), Tbilisi (Georgia, 1991), Indianapolis (USA, 1992), Maryland (USA, 1993), Oklahoma (USA, 1994), Georgia (1995)
- Honorary Doctor of Law at the University of South Florida St. Petersburg (1991), University of Macerata (Italy, 1992), St. Petersburg Law Institute of the Russian Interior Ministry
- Honorary Doctor of Political Science, University of Genoa (Italy, 1992)
- Honorary Doctor of the University of Arts in Oklahoma City (1993)
- Honorary Doctor of Humanities, Towson University (Baltimore, USA, 1993)
- Professor Emeritus of the University of Bordeaux (France), East European Institute of Psychoanalysis (St. Petersburg, Russia)
- Mitterrand awarded the Foundation "Memoria" (France, 1991)
- Prize winner of the National Democratic Institute of the A. Garrimana (USA, Washington, 1992)
- Prize winner J. Fulbright National Law Center at George Washington University (Washington, USA, 1992)
- International Leonardo Prize (1996)
- Prize winners Starovoitova (2000, posthumously)
- Tsarskoye Selo Art Prize (2001, posthumously)
- Winner of the International Prize for the development and strengthening of cultural ties in the Baltic Sea Region "Baltic Star" (2005, posthumously)
- Gold Medal of the city of Dubrovnik (Croatia, 1991)
- Gold Medal of the city of Florence (Italy, 1991)
- Full member of the St. Petersburg Academy of Engineering (Department of economic and legal sciences) (1992)
- Member of the International Informatization Academy (Moscow, 1995)
- Honorary member of the St. Petersburg Union of Engineering Societies (1992)
- Gagarin Medal (1996)
- Medal Admiral MP Lazarev (1996)
- "Gratitude" medal of the Nagorno-Karabakh Republic (2002, posthumously)
- Imperial Order of St. Alexander Nevsky (2002, posthumously)

== See also ==
- Saint Petersburg City Administration
