= Olga Buzova =

Russian singer (born 1986)

- Ольга Бузова
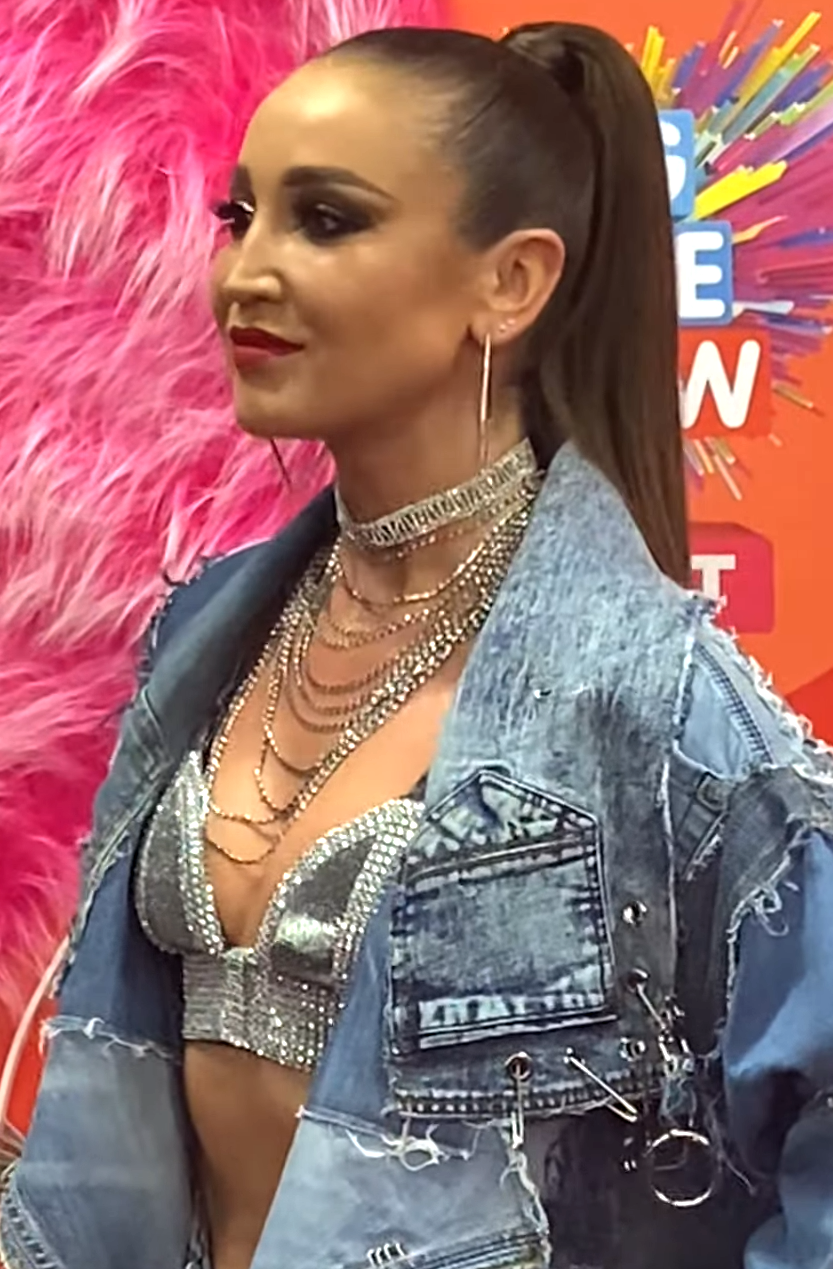
- Buzova in 2024
- Born: 20 January 1986 (age 40); Leningrad, Russian SFSR, Soviet Union
- Education: Saint Petersburg State University
- Occupations: TV presenter, writer, singer, actress, designer
- Spouse: Dmitri Tarasov (m. 2012; div. 2016)

Olga Igorevna Buzova (Russian: Ольга Игоревна Бузова; born 20 January 1986) is a Russian media personality and singer. She is regarded as one of the most successful Russian contemporary entertainers. Buzova is known for appearing on Dom-2, a Russian reality TV show.

== Biography ==
Olga Igorevna Buzova was born on 20 January 1986 in Leningrad into the family of Igor Dmitriyevich Buzov, a veteran of the Soviet Armed Forces, and Irina Aleksandrovna Buzova, a dentist. Buzova has a younger sister, Anna, as well as a grandmother who lives in Klaipėda, Lithuania.

In 2019, she participated in the Russian version of Fort Boyard.

She appeared in the seventh season of ice show contest Ice Age.

She was the tenth-highest Russian earner on Instagram and YouTube in 2021, with net revenue of about 3.3 million US dollars from 23.4 million subscribers.

== Assessments ==
A. E. Koshcheev, in his article "Glamour in the Space of Modern Variety Art", states:

The image of Olga Buzova essentially appears to represent a stereotypical standard of a pop performer, expressed in the following characteristics: songs with trivial content and music, provocative behavior on stage and screen, putting her private life on public display, and seeking attention through various scandals and conflicts.

T. N. Novozhilova, in her academic study analyzing the values of different generations, concludes that "while for the older generation, for example, Olga Buzova is the embodiment of promiscuity and vulgarity, for the young people of Generation Z she is a symbol of success and financial independence".

Researchers O. A. Logunova and P. A. Lebedev, in an article devoted to "digital celebrities", see the phenomenon of Olga Buzova's success in her "perfect 'ordinariness'" and argue that she has become a prominent example of an "ordinary celebrity possessing no obvious talents, while her sphere of quasi-expertise extends to such areas as beauty, fashion, music and, more recently, theatre".

== Public position ==
Buzova has repeatedly expressed support for the LGBT community: she has performed concerts at gay clubs, spoken out against homophobia, and held a rainbow flag. In July 2020, she published a post on her Instagram blog in support of members of the LGBT community. Buzova discussed her experience of interacting with members of sexual minorities and expressed her affection for them, stating, "I adore gays, lesbians and transgender people". She believes that same-sex marriage should be legalized in Russia.

In 2021, Buzova stated that she supported the incumbent government and President Vladimir Putin.

In 2022, she supported the Russian invasion of Ukraine, visited the occupied territories of Ukraine, mocked Russians who had left Russia because of the war with Ukraine, and promoted the symbol of the Russian invasion on social media.

In June 2023, both of Buzova's scheduled concerts in Israel were cancelled following protests by activists who accused her of supporting Russian aggression against Ukraine.

== Sanctions ==
In July 2017, because she toured in annexed Crimea, Buzova was included in the "Myrotvorets" database for "deliberate violation of the state border of Ukraine" and "illegal touring activities on the territory of Russia-occupied Crimea".

On 19 October 2022, amid Russia's invasion of Ukraine, Buzova was placed on Ukraine's sanctions lists for "supporting Putin's regime". The sanctions involve the blocking of assets, the complete cessation of commercial operations, and the suspension of fulfillment of economic and financial obligations. She was also listed by the Anti-Corruption Foundation as a corrupt person and a warmonger because she "took part in a pro-Russian propaganda campaign in the Russian-occupied territories of Ukraine".

== Personal life ==
Buzova married football player Dmitry Tarasov on 26 June 2012. The marriage ended in divorce on 30 December 2016.

She was in a relationship with David Manoukian starting 7 August 2019. On 22 January 2021, Olga announced the couple had broken up.

In 2022, she openly endorsed the Russian invasion of Ukraine.

In addition to her native Russian, Buzova speaks English, German, and Italian.

== Discography ==
=== Albums ===
- Под звуки поцелуев (2017) (To the Sound of Kisses) (Certifications – Russia 3×Platinum 200,000 units)
- Принимай меня (2018) (Accept Me) (Certifications – Russia 2×Platinum 100,000 units)
- Вот она я (2021) (Here I Am)

=== Singles ===
- Под звуки поцелуев (2016) (Sounds of Kisses)
- Привыкаю (2017) (Getting Used)
- Люди не верили (2017) (People Didn't Believe)
- Улететь (2017) (Fly Away)
- Нам будет жарко (feat. Настя Кудри) (2017) (We Will Be Hot feat. Nastya Kudri)
- Мало половин (2017) (Few Halves) (Certifications – Russia Platinum 100,000 units)
- Not Enough for Me (2017)
- Хит-парад (2017) (Hit Parade)
- WIFI (2017)
- Одна ночь (2018) (One Night)
- Она не боится (2018) (She's Not Afraid)
- Тоже музыка (2018) (Also Music)
- Чемпион (2018) (Champion)
- Ночь текила (2018) (Tequila Night)
- Принимай меня (2018) (Accept Me)
- На Доме-2 (ЛОVА ЛОVА) (feat. Витя АК) (2017) (At House 2 (LOVA LOVA) feat. Vitya AK)
- Миром правит любовь (Love Rules The World) (2018)
- Танцуй под Бузову (Dance Under Buzova) (2018)
- Очень хорошо (Very Good) (2019)
- Поцелуй на балконе (feat. Лёша Свик) (Kiss on the balcony feat. Lesha Svik) (2019)
- Женское слово (Woman Word) (2019)
- Водица (Water) (2019)
- Лайкер (Liker) (2019)
- Вот она я (Here l Am) (2019)
- Я еще верю (I Still Believe) (2019)
- Не виновата (Not Guilty) (2019)
- Мандаринка (feat. DAVA) (2019) (Tangerine feat. DAVA)
- В огне (On Fire) (2020)
- SWIPE (2020)
- Давай останемся дома (Let's Stay Home) (2020)
- Сука весна (Bitch Spring) (2020)
- Скука весна (Boredom Spring) (2020)
- Орбит без сахара (Orbit without sugar) (2020)
- Mira me Bebe (2020)
- X.О (2020)
- Проблема (Problem) (2020)
- Ненормальный вайб (Abnormal vibe) (2020)
- Хейт (Hate) (2020)
- Снежинки (Snowflakes) (2020)
- Колбаса (Sausage) (2020)
- Розовые очки (Pink glasses) (2021)
- Грустный трек (Sad track) (2021)
- Так сильно (So strong) (2021)
- Завязывай (Finish) (2021)
- Женская доля (Female share) (2021)
- Без дел (Without affairs) (2021)
- Код любви (Love code) (2021)
- Игрушка (Toy) (2021)
- Не буди во мне зверя (Don't wake the beast in me) (2022)
- Делать добро (To do good) (2022)
- Baby Tonight (2022)
- Михаил (Mikhail) (2022)
- Антитела (Antibodies) (2022)
- Худи (Hoodie) (2022)
- Заплачу (Will Pay) (2023)
- Верни (Refund) (2023)
- Позови (Call) (2023)

== Videography ==
- Под звуки поцелуев (2017) (Sounds of Kisses) (DJ PitkiN Remix) – Lyric Video
- Привыкаю (2017) (Getting Used) – Mood Video
- Привыкаю (2017) (Getting Used)
- Люди не верили (2017) (People Didn't Believe)
- Нам будет жарко (feat. Настя Кудри) (2017) (We Will Be Hot feat. Nastya Kudri)
- Мало половин (2017) (Few Halves)
- Not Enough For Me (2017) – Lyric Video
- Хит-парад (2017) (Hit Parade)
- Неправильная (2017) (Wrong)
- WIFI (2018)
- Бери меня (2018) (Take me)
- Чемпион (2018) (Champion)
- Принимай меня (2018) (Accept Me)
- Губы (2018) (Lips) – Lyric Video
- Пятница (2018) (Friday) – Lyric Video
- Алкоголь (2018) (Alcohol) – Lyric Video
- АтоМы (2018) (Atoms) – Lyric Video
- Эгоистка (2018) (Selfish) – Lyric Video
- На Доме-2 (ЛОVА ЛОVА) (feat. Витя АК) (2017) (At House 2 (LOVA LOVA) feat. Vitya AK)
- Танцуй под Бузову (Dance Under Buzova) (2018)
- Эгоистка (2019) (Selfish)
- Поцелуй на балконе (feat. Лёша Свик) (Kiss on the balcony feat. Lesha Svik) (2019) – Mood Video
- Очень хорошо (Very Good) (2019)
- Водица (Water) (2019)
- Лайкер (Layker) (2019)
- Не виновата (Not Guilty) (2019)
- Мандаринка (feat. DAVA) (2019) (Tangerine feat. DAVA) – Mood Video
- Мандаринка (feat. DAVA) (2019) (Tangerine feat. DAVA)
- В огне (On Fire) (2020) – Lyric Video
- В огне (On Fire) (2020) – Mood Video
- SWIPE (2020) – Lyric Video
- Давай останемся дома (Let's Stay Home) (2020) – Lyric Video
- Давай останемся дома (Let's Stay Home) (2020)
- Сука весна (Bitch Spring) (2020) – Mood Video
- Орбит без сахара (Orbit without sugar) (2020)
- Mira me Bebe (feat. Джаро и Ханза) (feat. Jaro and Hanza) (2020) – Lyric Video
- Mira me Bebe (feat. Джаро и Ханза) (feat. Jaro and Hanza) (2020)
- X.O. (2020) – Lyric Video
- Проблема (Problem) (2020) – Mood Video
- Проблема (Problem) (2020) – Comic Video
- Хейт (Hate) (2020) – Mood Video
- Снежинки (Snowflakes) (2020)
- Снежинки (Snowflakes) (2020) – Lyric Video
- Колбаса (Sausage) (2020)
- Розовые очки (Pink glasses) (2021) – Mood Video
- Розовые очки (Pink glasses) (2021) – Lyric Video
- Грустный трек (Sad track) (2021) – Lyric Video
- Грустный трек (Sad track) (2021) – Mood Video
- АтоМы (Atoms) (2021)
- Так сильно (So strong) (2021)
- Женская доля (Female Share) (2021) – Mood Video
- Без дел (Without Affairs) (2021)
- Код любви (Love Code) (2021) – Mood Video
- Выключим рассвет (Turn Off The Dawn) (2021) – Mood Video
- Спойлер (Spoiler) (2021) – Mood Video
- Я не знакомлюсь (I Don't Meet) (2021) – Mood Video
- Танцы на слезах (Dancing On Tears) (2021)
- Игрушка (Toy) (2021)
- Не буди во мне зверя (Don't wake the beast in me) (2022) – Mood Video
- Делать добро (To do good) (2022) – Mood Video
- Baby Tonight (2022) – Mood Video
- Михаил (Mikhail) (2022) – Mood Video
- Антитела (Antibodies) (2022) – Mood Video
- Худи (Hoodie) (2022) – Mood Video
- Заплачу (Will Pay) (2023)
- Верни (Refund) (2023)
- Позови (Call) (2023)

== Tours ==
- Под звуки поцелуев (2017–2018) (Sounds of Kisses)
- Принимай меня (2018–2021) (Accept Me)
- Вот она я (2022–2023) (Here I Am)
