= Pod zvuki potseluyev =

2017 studio album by Olga Buzova

Studio album by Olga Buzova
- Released: 6 October 2017
- Recorded: 2016–2017
- Genre: Pop music, deep house, indie pop, R&B
- Language: Russian, English
- Label: Archer Music Production LLC
- Producer: Aram Archer

Olga Buzova chronology
Pod zvuki potseluyev (2017)	Prinimay menya (2018)

Singles from Pod zvuki potseluyev
- 1. "Privykayu" Released: 19 January 2017; 2. "Lyudi ne verili" Released: 10 April 2017; 3. "Malo polovin" Released: 5 June 2017; 4. "Khit-parad" Released: 8 September 2017; 5. "Nepravilnaya" Released: 1 December 2017; 6. "Beri menya" Released: 9 April 2018

Professional ratings
Review scores
Source	Rating
InterMedia	2/5 stars

Pod zvuki potseluyev (Russian: Под звуки поцелуев; transl. To the Sound of Kisses) is the debut studio album by Russian singer Olga Buzova, released on 6 October 2017 through Archer Music Production LLC.

== Commercial performance ==
In the first 15 minutes after the release, the album reached the top spot on iTunes in Russia, which was a record, as the album has 3 platinum in the same country and is one of the best-selling releases of 2017, as well as the most discussed. Olga received more than 10 awards and nominations for the album, including "Breakthrough of the Year".

== Promotion ==
Six official singles were released in support of the album: "Privykayu", "Lyudi ne verili", "Malo polovin", "Khit-parad", "Nepravilnaya" and "Beri menya", each of which had a music video.

After the release of the album, Olga announced a concert tour with the same name "Pod zvuki potseluyev" in the CIS countries. The first two concerts were held in St. Petersburg and Moscow, which took place on 2 and 3 November 2017.

== Track listing ==
No.	Title	Length
1.	"Pod zvuki potseluyev"	3:30
2.	"Khit-parad"	3:52
3.	"Lyudi ne verili"	4:14
4.	"Ravnovesiye"	3:18
5.	"Privykayu"	3:48
6.	"Malo polovin"	3:33
7.	"Nepravilnaya"	4:04
8.	"Beri menya"	2:45
9.	"Sama po sebe"	3:51
10.	"Not Enough for Me"	3:44
11.	"Uletet'"	3:01
12.	"Malo polovin" (DJ Tarantino / DJ Dyxanin Remix)	4:22
13.	"Pod zvuki potseluyev" (DJ Pitkin Remix)	2:56
14.	"Privykayu" (DJ Sasha Veter Remix)	4:48
Total length:		51:46

== Certifications ==
Region	Certification	Certified units/sales
Russia (NFPF)	3× Platinum	150,000^{*}
^{*} Sales figures based on certification alone.
