= Kseniya Borodina =

Russian television presenter and actress

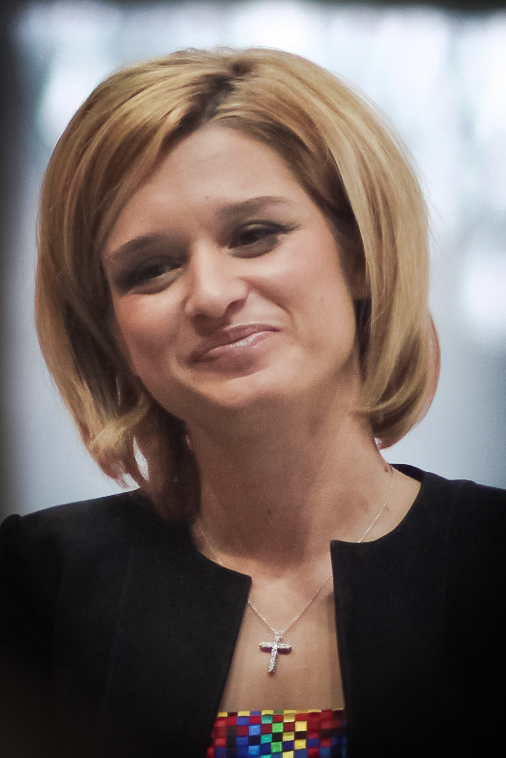
- Borodina in 2011
- Born: Ksenia Kimovna Amoyeva; March 8, 1983 (age 43); Moscow, USSR
- Occupations: Television presenter, actress
- Years active: 2004–present
- Known for: Reality show House 2
- Height: 5 ft 5 in (165 cm)
- Spouse(s): Yury Budagov (m.2008-2011; 1 child)
- Partner(s): Mikhail Teryokhin (d.2011-2012, broken engagement)
- Children: Maria Budagova; June 10, 2009 (age 17)
- Parent: Kim Amoyev

Kseniya Kimovna Borodina (born Amoyeva) (Russian: Ксе́ния Ки́мовна Бородина́ (Амо́ева); born on March 8, 1983) is a Russian television presenter and actress. From 2004 to 2023, she was the presenter of the reality show House 2.

== Personal life ==
From 2008 to 2011 Kseniya was married to businessman Yury Budagov, they have one child together — a daughter named Maria Budagova (born June 10, 2009). From June 2011 to August 2012 Kseniya was in a relationship with now ex-member of House 2 Mikhail Teryokhin, they were engaged just a month before their split.

On 3 July 2015, she married businessman Kurban Omarov. Besides Maria, they have two other children: step-son Omar (born on 1 February 2008) and daughter Teona "Tenya" (born on 22 December 2015). They moved to Zhukovski region in 2016, at the current moment Kseniya lives in Moscow with her family.
