= Super (Russian TV channel) =

Subbota!
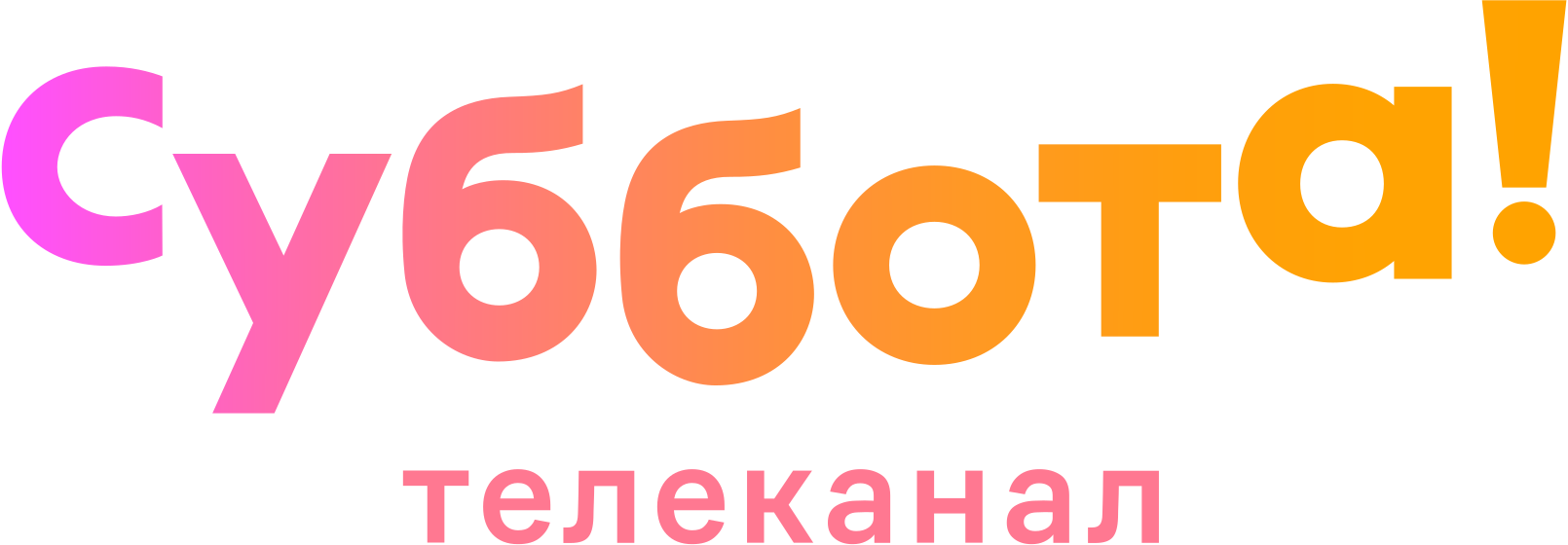
- Country: Russia
- Headquarters: Moscow

Programming
- Language: Russian

Ownership
- Owner: Gazprom Media

History
- Launched: 15 December 2017; 8 years ago

Subbota! is an all-Russian entertainment TV channel.

It began test broadcasting on December 15, 2017. On January 1, 2018, it went into main broadcasting under the name "Super", positioning itself as a TV channel of romantic comedies for family viewing. The target audience consisted of viewers from 14 to 44 years old, and its core was young families with children.

On February 1, 2021, at 5:00 Moscow time, the channel changed its name to "Subbota!" due to insufficiently high ratings. The target audience changed to female.

== History ==
=== Super (2017-2021) ===
The channel was created by the descendants of the company Yellow, Black and White, which produced rated humor programs and series for the STS TV channel. The company's executives, Vitaly Shlyappo, Eduard Iloyan, Alexei Trotsyuk and Denis Zhalinsky, had for several years offered the holding company CTC Media to buy their company, but each time the offer was rejected.

After another failed deal, in the fall of 2017, YBW management decided to start a partnership with Gazprom-Media Holding, as a result of which the employees who left Yellow, Black and White (more than 100 people) became engaged in content production and marketing for the future TV channel. Especially for this purpose, Solaris Promo Production bought from YBW the content previously produced for the STS TV channel. It was this content that was to become the basis for the Super TV channel.

As part of the exclusive contracts, the staff of the new channel was prohibited from cooperating with other channels and, thus, the cooperation with STS ceased after filming the second season of the series Ivanovs-Ivanovs.

Shortly before the start of broadcasting, STS Media bought back its video library from Solaris Promo Production, and instead of it “Super” in the first months of broadcasting showed foreign TV series and movies, animated series, as well as some TNT projects, including “Deffchonki”, “Filfak”, “Sweet Life”, “Sasha+Masha”.

On December 15, 2017, test broadcasting of the channel was launched on Yamal-401 (90 degrees E) and ABS-2 (75 degrees E) satellites. Then the TV channel received the first pool of frequencies in 8 cities of Russia. On December 29, ahead of schedule, “Super” was launched in Moscow, St. Petersburg and Saratov on analog frequencies of TNT4 and TV-3 channels.

On January 1, 2018, the official launch of the channel took place. The channel's rating at the start was ten times lower than that shown two years ago by another channel of the holding - TNT4. In the first week of broadcasting “Super” was watched by an average of 3.5 thousand viewers aged 14–44 per day. In the first days of its operation the broadcasting was without advertising blocks (instead of them there was a promotional video about the new TV channel). Commercial advertising appeared only on January 14, 2018.
