= Dom-2 =

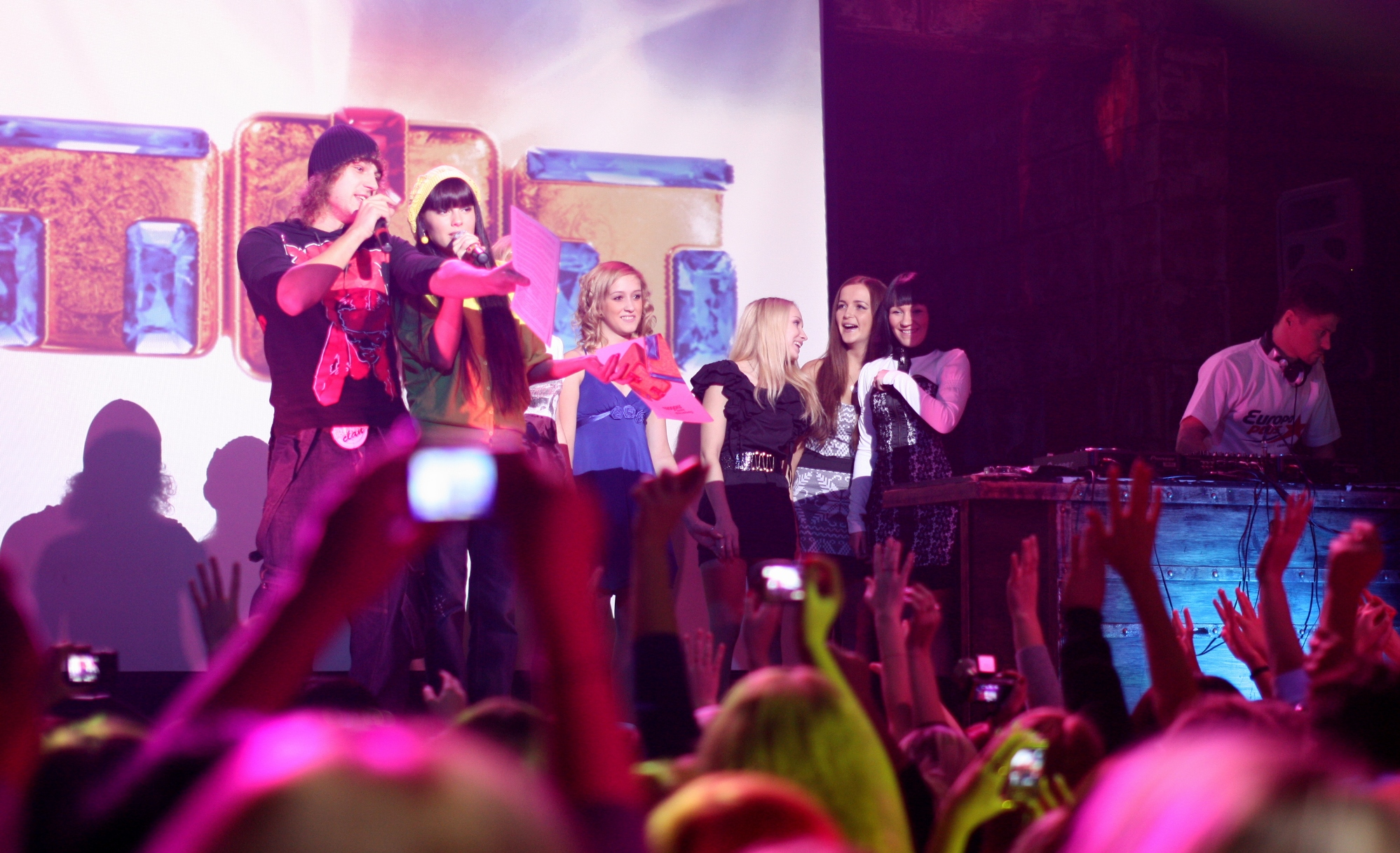
- "Dom-2 party" in Severodvinsk. Nelli Yermolayeva (Kuznetsova) and Nikita Kuznetsov
- Also known as: House-2
- Presented by: Kseniya Sobchak; Kseniya Borodina; Olga Buzova
- Country of origin: Russia
- Original language: Russian
- No. of seasons: 13
- No. of episodes: 5500

Production
- Executive producers: Aleksey Mikhailovskiy; Dmitriy Troitskiy
- Running time: 60 minutes

Original release
- Network: TNT

Dom-2 (Russian: Дом-2, literally: "House-2") is a Russian reality TV show created by TNT channel. In the show, the contestants' main objective is to construct a house whilst trying to find a partner in the process. Couples then compete for the house itself.

The first episode of Dom-2 was aired on May 11, 2004. It remains one of the most highly rated, profitable and longest-running reality shows on television in Russia. Dom-2 broadcasts on the TNT channel at 11 pm every day. It is hosted by Kseniya Sobchak and Kseniya Borodina.

After more than 5,500 episodes, as of July 2019, it is the longest running reality show in Russia. In December 2020, Dom-2 started to be shown in the United Kingdom when the TNT channel started to be broadcast on Freeview via Channelbox. On December 18, 2020 TNT officially announced a Dom-2 lockdown. The last episode of the show came out on December 30, 2020.

The show continued to air on U channel since April 19, 2021.

== Seasons ==
1. "House-2. Love" – May 11, 2004 – November 6, 2004
2. "House-2. Wintering" – November 7, 2004 – February 28, 2005
3. "House-2. The First Spring" – March 1, 2005 – May 31, 2005
4. "House-2. Heat" – June 1, 2005 – August 31, 2005
5. "House-2. That's Love!" – September 1, 2005 – November 14, 2005
6. "House-2. New Love" – November 15, 2005 – August 31, 2006
7. "House-2. Fallove" – September 1, 2006 – November 30, 2006
8. "House-2. About Love" – December 1, 2006 – August 31, 2007
9. "House-2. Dreams Come True" – September 1, 2007 – October 31, 2007
10. "House-2. City of Love" – November 1, 2007 – 2020
11. "House-2. Island of Love" – November 28, 2014 – 2020
12. "House-2. New Love" – April 19, 2021 – present

=== Man of the Year ===
1. Unofficially 2007. Semyon Frolov (Russian: Семён Фролов), Tver, Russia (1st place; rejection of title, was given the title to Stepan Menshchikov, got the right to give immunities); Olga Nikolayeva (Russian: Ольга Николаева), Penza, Russia (2nd place; she won a money); Stepan Menshchikov (Russian: Степан Меньщиков), Yekaterinburg, Russia (3rd place; was given the title of Semyon Frolov)
2. 2009. Rimma Pənciyeva, Bakı, Azerbaijan (1st place; basically voted from Azerbaijan and Ukraine); Natalya Varvina (Russian: Наталья Варвина), Voljsky, Volgograd Region (2nd place, dupe of the Year; basically voted from South Volga Region); Gleb Strawberry (Russian: Глеб Строберри), Vladivostok (3rd place; basically voted from Far East)
3. 2010. Women's Final. The finalists were only women: Natalya Varvina (Russian: Наталья Варвина), Voljsky, Volgograd Region (1st place; finalist of previous competition; previous dupe of the Year; basically voted from South Volga Region of Russia); Nelli Yermolayeva (Russian: Нелли Ермолаева), Samara (2nd place; basically voted from Uralic and Volga Region of Russia); Inna Volovicheva (Russian: Инна Воловичева), Belgorod (3rd place; basically voted from Belgorod and Voronej Region)
4. 2011. Vlad Kadonyi (Russian: Влад Кадони), Novosibirsk (1st place; basically voted from All Russia); Inna Volovicheva (Russian: Инна Воловичева), Belgorod (2nd place; finalist of previous competition; basically voted from Belgorod and Voronej Region); Yevgeniya Feofilaktova (Russian: Евгения Феофилактова), Kirov (3rd place; basically voted from North Russia)
5. 2012. Liberge Kpadonou (French: Liberge Kpadonou; Bashkir: Liberž Kpadonu), Öfö, Bashkortostan (1st place; basically voted from Bashkortostan and French-speaking African diaspora); Yevgeniya Feofilaktova (Russian: Евгения Феофилактова), Kirov (2nd place; finalist of previous competition; basically voted from North Russia); Serghei Pînzari, (Ukrainian: Сіргей Пинзарь; Romanian: Serghei Pînzari) St. Petersburg (3rd place; basically voted from St. Petersburg and Leningrad Region, Moldova and Ukraine)
6. 2013. Men's Final. The finalists were only men: Siarhei Syčkari (Belarusian: Сяргей Сычкарь), Minsk, Belarus (1st place; basically voted from Belarus and Ukraine); Serghei Pînzari, (Ukrainian: Сіргей Пинзарь; Romanian: Serghei Pînzari) St. Petersburg (2nd place; finalist of previous competition; dupe of the year; basically voted from St. Petersburg and Leningrad Region, Moldova, Romania and Ukraine); Andrei Cercassov (Russian: Андрей Черкассов), Milano, Italy (3rd place; website man; basically voted from Moscow and Italian Diaspora of Russia)
7. 2014. Controversies Tournament: Marina Afrikantova (Bulgarian: Марина Африкантова), Burgas, Bulgaria (automatically 1st place, but basically voted from Bulgaria, Balkan states, European Bulgarian diaspora and Post-Soviet Bulgarian diaspora); Aleksandr Zadoynov (Russian: Александр Задойнов), Yaroslavl (DSQ); Aliyono Ustinenko (Uzbek: Алиёно Устиненко), Farg'ona, Uzbekistan (DSQ in final); Siarhei Syčkari (Belarusian: Сяргей Сычкарь), Minsk, Belarus (previous winner; DSQ in final); Anna Kruchinina (Russian: Анна Кручинина), Moscow Oblast (automatically 2nd place)
8. 2015. Viktorija Romanjec, Maribor, Slovenia (1st place; basically voted from the Yugoslavian Diaspora of the Russian Federation); Ricardo José Zalas García, Gijón, Asturia, Spain (2nd place; basically voted from Spain); Alexandra Gozias, Cape Town (3rd place; basically voted from German-speaking countries)

=== Dupe of the Year ===
1. 2009. Natalya Varvina (Russian: Наталья Варвина), Voljsky, Volgograd Region
2. 2010. Nadezhda Yermakova (Russian: Надежда Ермакова), Oryol
3. 2011. Irina Aleksandrovna Agibalova (Russian: Ирина Александровна Агибалова), Pavlovski Posad, Moscow oblast (1st place); Nelli Yermolayeva (Russian: Нелли Ермолаева), Samara (2nd place); Margo Agibalova (Russian: Марго Агибалова), Pavlovski Posad, Moscow oblast (3rd place)
4. 2012. Irina Aleksandrovna Agibalova (Russian: Ирина Александровна Агибалова), Pavlovski Posad, Moscow oblast (1st place, 2nd title); Yevgeniya Feofilaktova (Russian: Евгения Феофилактова), Kirov (2nd place; finalist of 2012 final competition); Oksana Ryaska (Russian: Оксана Ряска), St. Petersburg
5. 2013. Serghei Pînzari, (Ukrainian: Сіргей Пинзарь; Romanian: Serghei Pînzari) St. Petersburg (1st place, finalist of the current final competition); Daria Pînzari (Russian: Дарья Пынзарь), Balakovo, Saratov oblast (2nd place, wife of current title holder); Aliyono Ustinenko (Uzbek: Алиёно Устиненко), Farg'ona, Uzbekistan (3rd place)
6. 2014. Aliyono Ustinenko (Uzbek: Алиёно Устиненко), Farg'ona, Uzbekistan (1st place; disqualifying finalist of the current final comp.); Alexander Gobozov, Vladikavkaz, Ossetia (2nd place; Aliyono Ustinenko's husband); Svetlana Ustinenko Uzbek: Светлана Устиненко, Farg'ona, Uzbekistan (3rd place; Aliyono's mother and Gobozov's mother-in-law).

=== Man of the Year for the Magazine (Journal) ===
1. 2009. Nektariy Liberman (Hebrew: נכטארי ליברמאן; Yiddish: נכטארי ליברמאן; Russian: Нектарий Либерман), Jerusalem
2. 2010. Węcesław Węgrzanowski (Polish: Węcesław Węgrzanowski), Krasnodar
3. 2011. Vlad Kadonyi (Viktor Golynov) (Russian: Влад Кадони (Виктор Голунов)), Novosibirsk (winner of this season final of the Man Year; 3rd place in the Bitva Extrasensov 'Battle of the Extrasenses; Russia's Psychics Challenge' TNT Project)
4. 2012. Serghei Pînzari, (Ukrainian: Сіргей Пинзарь; Romanian: Serghei Pînzari) St. Petersburg (finalist of this season final of the Man Year)
5. 2013. Yekaterina Korol (Russian: Екатерина Король), Rostov-on-Don
6. 2014. Elina Camiren (Russian: Элина Камирен), Tumen

=== Man of the Year for the Official Website ===
1. 2009. Andrei Cercassov (Russian: Андрей Черкассов), Milano, Italy (1st place; 2013 Man of Year for Official Website winner); Andrei Chuev (Russian: Андрей Чуев), Miami, Florida, United States (2nd place; 2013 Man of Year for Official Website winner); Daria Cherni'x (Russian: Дарья Черных), Balakovo, Saratov obl. (3rd place)
2. 2010. Sergey Adoyevtsev (Russian: Серге́й Адоевцев), Moscow/Serghei Pînzari, (Ukrainian: Сіргей Пинзарь; Romanian: Serghei Pînzari) St. Petersburg (1st/2nd place); Gleb Strawberry (Russian: Глеб Клубничка (Строберри)), Vladivostok (3rd place)
3. 2011. Węcesław Węgrzanowski (Polish: Węcesław Węgrzanowski), Krasnodar (1st place); Vlad Kadonyi (Russian: Влад Кадони), Novosibirsk (2nd place); winner of the 2011 Man of the Year and Winner of the 2011 Man of the Year for the Official Magazine; Yevgeni Kuzin (Russian: Евгений Кузин), Novorossiysk, Krasnodar Region
4. 2012. Valeriya Masterko (Russian: Валерия Мастерко), Novokuznetsk, Kemerovo oblast/Valeriya Kashubina (Russian: Валерия Кашубина), Elektrostal, MSK (1/2 1st place); Yekaterina Tokarewa (Russian: Екатерина Токарева), Rostov-on-Don (2nd place); Olga Hajiyenko (Russian: Ольга Гажиенко), Pavlovski Posad, Moscow Region (3rd place)
5. 2013. Andrei Cercassov (Russian: Андрей Черкассов), Milano, Italy/ Andrei Chuev (Russian: Андрей Чуев), Miami, Florida, United States (1/2 1st place); Węcesław Węgrzanowski (Polish: Węcesław Węgrzanowski), Krasnodar (2nd place); Nikolay Dolzhanskiy (Russian: Николай Должанский), Moscow (3rd place)
6. 2014. Andrei Cercassov (Russian: Андрей Черкассов), Milano, Italy (1st place; Andrei Cercassov; the second times in succession); Aleksandr Gobozetâ (Iron Ossetic: Александр Гобозеты), Vladikavkaz, North Ossetia (2nd place); Hanna Kudymava (Belarusian: Ганна Кудымава), Minsk, Belarus (3rd place)

=== Record for length of time on the project ===
Former members:

- Stepan Menshchikov, Yekaterinburg — 1758 days (from May 12, 2004, to March 5, 2009)
- Olga Buzova, St. Petersburg – 1677 days (from May 22, 2004, to December 24, 2008)
- Nadejda Yermakova – 1528 days (April 22, 2007, to June 30, 2011)
- Olga "Sun" Nikolayeva, Penza – 1460 days (с May 12, 2004 г по 11 мая 2008 г)
- Natalya Varvina – 1378 дней (с 2 августа 2007 г по 11 мая 2011г)
- Viktoriya Karasyova (Tori), MSK – 1375 дней (с 30 сентября 2005 г по 6 июля 2009 г)
- Anastasiya Dashko, Salexard – 1203 дня (с 22 октября 2004 г по 7 февраля 2008г)
- Roman Tretyakov, Taganrog – 1202 дня (с 15 мая 2004 г по 30 августа 2007 г)
- Alyona Vodonayeva, Tumen – 1067 дней (с 10 июля 2004 г по 12 июня 2007 г).
- Rɵstəm Solntsev-Qalğanov – 1054 дня (с 3 января 2007 г по 22 ноября 2009 г)
- Sam Selezniov, Sochi – 1049 дней (с 25 марта 2005 г по 7 февраля 2008 г).
- Alexander Nelidov, Moscow – 946 дней (с 12 мая 2004 г по 14 декабря 2006 г).
- May Abrikosov, Voroneж – 906 дней (с 9 июля 2004 г по 1 января 2007 г)
- Vlad Kadonyi (Viktor Golynov), Novosibirsk – 880 дней (c 20 февраля 2009 по 27 сентября 2011 г.)
- Inna Volovicheva, Belgorod – 875 дней (c 25 февраля 2009 по 11 октября 2011 г.)
- Yelena Bushina, Yekaterinburg – 860 дней (с 19 октября 2007 г по 25 февраля 2010 г)
- Sergey Adoyevtsev (Sergey Pali'ch), MSK – 874 дня (с 6 июля 2008 г по 27 ноября 2010)
- Mariya Adoyevtseva (Krugli'xina), MSK – 872 дня (с 8 июля 2008 г по 27 ноября 2010)
- Natalya Nelidova, Moscow – 825 дней (с 10 сентября 2004 г по 14 декабря 2006 г)
- Nelli Yermolayeva (Kuznetsova), Samara – 822 дня ( с 5 июня 2009 г по 5 сентября 2011 г)

Дарья Пынзарь, Сент-Китс И Невис Петербург – 1418 дней (c 28 декабря 2007 г) Сергей Пынзарь, Балаково, Саратов-1327 ((c 28 2008 2008) Марго Агибалова, Павловский Посад, Московский-1124 ((C 17 2008 2008) Венцеслав Венгжановский (Ярослав Шурупов), Краснодар – 1047 ((C 3 2009 2009) Jevgenija Феофилактова, Кирова-991 ((C 27 2009 2009)

=== Domestic pair ===
1. Aleksandr Titov (Russian: Александр Титов) and Olga Kravchenko (Russian: Ольга Кравченко) on July 17, 2004
2. Aleksandr Nelidov (Russian: Александр Нелидов) and Natalya Pavlova (Russian: Наталья Павлова) on July 9, 2005
3. Yevgeni Kuzin (Russian: Евгений Кузин) and Margo Agibalova (Russian: Марго Агибалова) on May 26, 2009 (divorce on March 1, 2011)
4. Yelena Bushina (Russian: Елена Бушина) and Dmitri Zheleznyak (Russian: Дмитрий Железняк) on February 12, 2010
5. Serghei Pînzari (Ukrainian: Сергій Пинзар, Romanian: Serghei Pînzari) and Darya Cherni'x (Russian: Дарья Черных) on May 2, 2010
6. Sergey Adoyevsev (Russian: Сергей Адоевцев) and Mariya Krugli'xina (Russian: Мария Круглыхина) on May 2, 2010
7. Nichita Cuznețov and Nelly Yermolayeva (Russian: Нелли Ермолаева) on February 14, 2011 (divorce on June 6, 2012)
8. Ilya Hajiyenko (Ukrainian: Илья Гажиєнко) and Olga Agibalova (Russian: Ольга Агибалова) on September 27, 2011
9. Tiğran Sælibekov (Iron Ossetic: Тигъран Сӕлибеков) and Yuliya Kolesnichenko (Ukrainian: Юлія Колесниченко) on December 13, 2011
10. Węcesław Węgrżanowski and Yekaterina Tokareva (Russian: Екатерина Токарева) on December 31, 2011 (divorce on August 26, 2012)
11. Ivāns Novikovs and Inna Volovicheva (Russian: Инна Воловичева) on February 21, 2012
12. Anton Gusev (Russian: Антон Гусев) and Yevgeniya Feofilaktova (Russian: Евгения Феофилактова) on June 15, 2012 (divorce on February 3, 2013)
13. Węcesław Węgrżanowski and Yekaterina Korol (Russian: Екатерина Король) on July 7, 2013
14. Vasili Toderică and Antonina Klimenko (Ukrainian: Антонина Кліменко) on October 16, 2013
15. Aleksandar Gobozetâ (Iron Ossetic: Александар Гобозеты) and Aliyono Ustinenko (Uzbek: Алиёно Устиненко) on November 30, 2013 (divorce on October 4, 2014)
16. Constantine Press and Alisa Nikitina (Russian: Алиса Никитина) on December 1, 2013
17. Gabriel Díaz Álvarez and Chryścina Liaskaviec (Belarusian: Хрысьціна Ляскавец) on December 23, 2013
18. Elina Camiren (Russian: Элина Камирен) and Aleksandr Zadoynov (Russian: Александр Задойнов) on January 26, 2014
19. Tatyana Kiryluk (Ukrainian: Тат'яна Кірилюк) and Eugenio Higo on December 8, 2014
20. Liberge Kpadonou and Yevgeni Rudnev (Russian: Евгений Руднев) on December 8, 2014
