= Don't Bore Us, Get to the Chorus! – Roxette's Greatest Video Hits =

Don't Bore Us, Get to the Chorus! - Roxette's Greatest Video Hits

Video by Roxette
- Released: 20 December 1995
- Genre: Pop rock
- Length: 87:29
- Language: English
- Label: EMI; Picture Music International

Roxette chronology
Live-Ism (1992)	Don't Bore Us, Get to the Chorus! - Roxette's Greatest Video Hits (1995)	Crash! Boom! Live! (1996)

Don't Bore Us, Get to the Chorus! – Roxette's Greatest Video Hits is the second music video compilation by Swedish pop music duo Roxette, released on 20 December 1995 on VHS, LaserDisc and double VCD formats by EMI and Picture Music International. The video is a companion piece to the duo's first greatest hits compilation album, Don't Bore Us, Get to the Chorus! - Roxette's Greatest Hits, which had been released two months earlier.

== Track listing ==
All songs written by Per Gessle, except "You Don't Understand Me" by Gessle and Desmond Child and "Listen to Your Heart", "Spending My Time", "(Do You Get) Excited?" and "Queen of Rain" by Gessle and Mats Persson. All songs produced by Clarence Öfwerman.

Don't Bore Us, Get to the Chorus! – Roxette's Greatest Video Hits
No.	Title	Director	Length
1.	"You Don't Understand Me"	Greg Masuak	4:24
2.	"The Look"	Peter Heath	3:55
3.	"Dressed for Success"	Peter Heath	4:09
4.	"Listen to Your Heart"	Doug Freel	5:04
5.	"Dangerous"	Doug Freel	3:54
6.	"It Must Have Been Love"	Doug Freel	4:18
7.	"Joyride"	Doug Freel	4:38
8.	"Fading Like a Flower (Every Time You Leave)"	Doug Freel	3:56
9.	"The Big L."	Anders Skog	4:27
10.	"Spending My Time"	Wayne Isham	4:45
11.	"Church of Your Heart"	Wayne Isham	3:17
12.	"(Do You Get) Excited?"	Wayne Isham	4:17
13.	"How Do You Do!"	Anders Skog	3:14
14.	"Queen of Rain"	Matt Murray	4:51
15.	"Fingertips '93"	Jonas Åkerlund	3:41
16.	"Almost Unreal"	Michael Geoghegan	4:18
17.	"Sleeping in My Car"	Michael Geoghegan	3:45
18.	"Crash! Boom! Bang!"	Michael Geoghegan	4:53
19.	"Fireworks"	Michael Geoghegan	3:37
20.	"Run to You"	Jonas Åkerlund	3:38
21.	"Vulnerable"	Jonas Åkerlund	4:28
Total length:			87:29

== Charts ==
Chart (1996)	Peak; position
UK Music Videos (OCC)	16
