= Crash! Boom! Live! =

Video by Roxette
- Released: 19 September 1996
- Recorded: Ellis Park Stadium, South Africa on 14 January 1995
- Genre: Pop rock
- Length: 87 minutes (approximate)
- Language: English
- Label: EMI; Picture Music International
- Director: Koos Hattingh
- Producer: Storm Productions

Roxette chronology
Don't Bore Us, Get to the Chorus! – Roxette's Greatest Video Hits (1995)	Crash! Boom! Live! (1996)	All Videos Ever Made & More! (2001)

Crash! Boom! Live! is the fourth concert film by Swedish pop music duo Roxette, released on 19 September 1996 on VHS and LaserDisc formats by Picture Music International and EMI. It contains a shortened version of the duo's 14 January 1995 concert in the Ellis Park Stadium in Johannesburg, South Africa of the Crash! Boom! Bang! Tour, which saw the band performing to over one million people during its eighty-plus concerts throughout South Africa, Europe, Australia, Asia and Latin America. According to the video's liner notes, attendance for this show was in excess of 52,000 people.

== Formats and track listings ==
All songs written by Per Gessle, except "Listen to Your Heart", "Lies" and "Spending My Time" by Gessle and Mats Persson.

- LaserDisc (Japan TOLW-3239)
- VHS (Europe MVN-491555-3 · Japan TOVW-3239)
1. "Sleeping in My Car"
2. "Fireworks"
3. "Almost Unreal"
4. "Dangerous"
5. "Crash! Boom! Bang!"
6. "Listen to Your Heart"
7. "The First Girl on the Moon"
8. "Harleys & Indians (Riders in the Sky)"
9. "Lies"
10. "The Rain"
11. "Run to You"
12. "It Must Have Been Love"
13. "Dressed for Success"
14. "The Big L."
15. "Spending My Time"
16. "The Look"
17. "Love Is All (Shine Your Light on Me)"
18. "Joyride"

== Credits and personnel ==
Credits adapted from the liner notes of Crash! Boom! Live!.

- Directed by Koos Hattingh
- Produced by Storm Productions on behalf of Roxette and South African Broadcasting Corporation
- Executive produced by Tor Nielsen and Thomas Johansson at EMA Telstar
- Concert promoted by Big Concerts
- Audio recording and mixing by Alar Suurna

Musicians

- Marie Fredriksson – vocals, electric guitar, piano
- Per Gessle – vocals, rhythm guitar, harmonica
- Per "Pelle" Alsing – drums and percussion
- Micke "Nord" Andersson – electric and lap steel guitars, mandolin, backing vocals
- Anders Herrlin – bass
- Jonas Isacsson – acoustic and electric guitars
- Clarence Öfwerman – keyboards
- Mats "M.P." Persson – drums, percussion, backing vocals
