= Rarities (Roxette album) =

Compilation album by Roxette
- Released: 10 February 1995
- Genre: Pop rock
- Length: 53:10
- Label: EMI
- Producer: Clarence Öfwerman; Per Gessle; Marie Fredriksson

Roxette chronology
Crash! Boom! Bang! (1994)	Rarities (1995)	Don't Bore Us, Get to the Chorus! (1995)

Singles from Rarities
- 1. "Vulnerable" Released: March 1995

Rarities is a compilation album by Swedish pop duo Roxette, released from 10 February 1995 by EMI exclusively in Southeast Asia and South America. The record is composed of previously released B-sides, demos, single mixes and remixes, as well as several songs from the duo's 1993 performance for MTV Unplugged. As of 2001, the compilation has sold in excess of a million copies worldwide.

== Album information ==
The album was issued exclusively in Latin America and Southeast Asia, with its release in those territories timed to coincide with dates of the band's "Crash! Boom! Bang! Tour". "Vulnerable" concomitantly served as both lead single from Rarities, as well as the fifth and final single from previous studio album Crash! Boom! Bang! (1994). The record includes four previously released remixes, including two single mixes: "Fingertips '93" – originally from 1992's Tourism – and Chris Lord-Alge's US Single Remix of "Dressed for Success". In addition to these, a remix of "Fireworks" created by British alternative rock band Jesus Jones was also included, along with an "Electric Dance Remix" of "Spending My Time" by MC King Carli and Dr Renault (pseudonyms used by regular Roxette producer Clarence Öfwerman and engineer Anders Herrlin). These had all been previously released on their respective singles.

Rarities also contains two previously released b-sides: "The Voice" appeared as the b-side to their 1988 single "Dressed for Success", while "The Sweet Hello, The Sad Goodbye" was released as the b-side to their November 1991 single "Spending My Time". Earlier that year, in April, the song had been released as the lead single from Thomas Anders' (of Modern Talking fame) second solo album, Whispers. The song also appeared on the 1993 album Over My Heart, by American pop chanteuse Laura Branigan. The demo version of their 1993 single "Almost Unreal" appeared on the "Run To You" CD single in 1994 while another demo - the non-album track "One Is Such a Lonely Number" - had previously appeared as the b-side to "The Big L." in 1991. The album also includes three recordings – "Joyride", "The Look" and "Dangerous" – from the band's 9 January 1993 performance at the Stockholm Circus for MTV Unplugged. The rest of their MTV Unplugged set remained unreleased until a DVD of their entire performance was included in The Rox Box/Roxette 86–06 box set.

== Track listing ==
All lyrics are written by Per Gessle; all music is composed by Gessle, except "Spending My Time" by Gessle and Mats MP Persson.

No.	Title	Producer(s)	Length
1.	"Vulnerable" (Single Version)	Clarence Öfwerman	4:30
2.	"Fingertips '93"	Öfwerman	3:42
3.	"Dressed for Success" (Look Sharp! U.S. Mix)	Öfwerman; Chris Lord-Alge^{[a]}	4:53
4.	"Joyride" (from MTV Unplugged)	Per Gessle; Marie Fredriksson; Öfwerman	5:35
5.	"The Look" (from MTV Unplugged)	Gessle; Fredriksson; Öfwerman	5:11
6.	"Dangerous" (from MTV Unplugged)	Gessle; Fredriksson; Öfwerman	3:13
7.	"The Sweet Hello, The Sad Goodbye"	Öfwerman	4:49
8.	"The Voice"	Öfwerman	4:27
9.	"Almost Unreal" (Demo, February 1993)	Gessle	3:25
10.	"Fireworks" (Jesus Jones Remix)	Öfwerman; Jesus Jones^{[a]}	4:11
11.	"Spending My Time" (Electric Dance Remix)	Öfwerman; Öfwerman^{[a]}; Herrlin^{[a]}	5:27
12.	"One Is Such a Lonely Number" (Demo, September 1987)	Öfwerman	3:33
Total length:			53:10

Notes

- ^{^[a]} signifies a remixer.

== Personnel ==
Credits adapted from the liner notes of Rarities.

Musicians

- Marie Fredriksson – lead vocals, tambourine (track 4), production (tracks 4–6)
- Per Gessle – lead vocals, acoustic guitar, keyboards, programming, mixing, production (tracks 4–6, 9), compiling
- Per "Pelle" Alsing – drums and percussion
- Vicki Benckert – backing vocals (tracks 4–6)
- Christer Jansson – drums (track 10)
- Anders Herrlin – acoustic bass, bass guitar, engineering, programming and remixing
- Jonas Isacsson – acoustic and electric guitars
- Jarl "Jalle" Lorensson – harmonica (track 10)
- Clarence Öfwerman – grand piano, keyboards, programming, production, mixing and remixing
- Staffan Öfwerman – backing vocals and percussion (tracks 4–6)
- Mats "MP" Persson – acoustic and electric guitars, keyboards, programming and engineering
- Per "Pelle" Sirén – electric guitars (track 10)
- Alar Suurna – percussion (track 10), engineering and mixing
- Nicolas "Nicki" Wallin – drums (track 10)

Technical

- Chris Lord-Alge – remixing (track 3)
- Mike Edwards – remixing (track 10)

== Charts ==
Chart (1995)	Peak; position
Japanese Albums (Oricon)	17

== Release history ==
Region	Date	Format	Label	Catalog #
Thailand	10 February 1995	CD; cassette	EMI	368 832277-2
Malaysia	10 February 1995	CD; cassette	EMI	368 832277-2
Indonesia	10 February 1995	CD; cassette	EMI	368 832277-2
Taiwan	17 February 1995	CD; cassette	EMI	368 832277-2
Japan	17 February 1995	CD; cassette	Toshiba EMI	TOCP-8488
Brazil	5 April 1995	CD; cassette	EMI	832277-2
Chile	5 April 1995	CD; cassette	EMI	832277-2
Argentina	5 April 1995	CD; cassette	EMI	832277-2
