= Don't Bore Us, Get to the Chorus! =

Don't Bore Us – Get to the Chorus! Roxette's Greatest Hits

Greatest hits album by Roxette
- Released: 23 October 1995
- Recorded: 1987–1994; July–August 1995
- Genre: Pop rock
- Length: 75:11
- Label: EMI
- Producers: Clarence Öfwerman; Per Gessle; Michael Ilbert

Roxette chronology
Rarities (1995)	Don't Bore Us – Get to the Chorus! Roxette's Greatest Hits (1995)	Baladas en Español (1996)

Alternative cover
- 2000 North American release

Singles from Don't Bore Us, Get to the Chorus!
- 1. "You Don't Understand Me" Released: 2 October 1995; 2. "The Look '95" Released: 13 November 1995 (UK); 3. "June Afternoon" Released: 8 January 1996; 4. "She Doesn't Live Here Anymore" Released: 22 April 1996

Don't Bore Us – Get to the Chorus! Roxette's Greatest Hits is the first greatest hits compilation album by Swedish pop duo Roxette, released on 30 October 1995 by EMI. The record contains the duo's four number ones from the US Billboard Hot 100 chart: "The Look", "Listen to Your Heart", "It Must Have Been Love" and "Joyride", and a further two which reached number two on the chart: "Dangerous" and "Fading Like a Flower (Every Time You Leave)". It also includes four newly recorded tracks, three of which were released as singles: "You Don't Understand Me", "June Afternoon" and "She Doesn't Live Here Anymore". The album's title is based on a quote from Motown-founder Berry Gordy.

The album was an immediate commercial success, selling over 2 million copies worldwide within 2 months of release. As of 2001, the compilation has sold in excess of 6 million copies worldwide. The record would not be released in the United States until 26 September 2000. This edition featured different cover art and consisted of an altered track listing—it excluded singles which were never released in the US, and included two singles from their then-most recent album, Have a Nice Day (1999).

== Background and recording ==
Roxette recorded four new songs for the compilation, three of which went on to be issued as commercial singles. "You Don't Understand Me" was released in October 1995 as the compilation's lead single internationally. It was co-written by Per Gessle with American composer Desmond Child, and was originally intended for submission to other recording artists. However, Gessle was so pleased with the song that he asked Marie Fredriksson to record the vocals. In the album's liner notes, Gessle described it as the first Roxette song to be written by an "outsider". In the United Kingdom, a remixed version of "The Look" – titled "The Look '95" – was released in November as the album's lead single there, where it peaked at number 28. This remixed version does not appear on the album.

"June Afternoon" and "She Doesn't Live Here Anymore" were released as subsequent singles. Both songs were predominantly recorded with members of Gessle's former band Gyllene Tider. The former would go on to become a top 40 hit in Belgium, Sweden, and Switzerland, while the latter charted in the lower regions of the German Singles Chart. The remaining new song, "I Don't Want to Get Hurt", was issued as a promotional single in Brazil, and became a sizable airplay hit there after it was predominantly featured in a Brazilian telenovela. Also included on the compilation are two previously released non-album singles: "It Must Have Been Love" and "Almost Unreal", from the soundtracks of Pretty Woman (1990) and Super Mario Bros. (1993), respectively.

== Critical reception ==
Professional ratings
Review scores
Source	Rating
Aftonbladet	3/5 stars
AllMusic	4.5/5 stars
Music Week	3/5 stars

Bryan Buss of AllMusic said that the album "exhibits what pop masters Per Gessle and Marie Fredriksson are, ... [they have] crafted some of the best tunes of the '80s and '90s." He described every song as a gem, and said: "Even with the pop renaissance of the late '90s, no one picked up where Roxette left off. This is a comprehensive collection of great contemporary music from overlooked and underrated pros." A 2016 feature in Renowned for Sound praised the record as being the "definitive greatest hits record to own above all other hits collections over the last 30 years." Editor Brendon Veevers described the new songs as "some of the bands finest work." Ronny Olovsson from Swedish publication Aftonbladet also complimented the new songs, calling them "just as strong [melodically]" as their biggest hit singles, but claimed that the production on their earlier material had aged badly.

In a review of the 2000 US version of the album, Billboard said: "It's ironic how some acts just rack up hit after hit, seemingly under the radar of pop culture. It's also interesting to note how easy it is to take such acts for granted. During its early-'90s heyday, no one took Roxette seriously. And yet the masses happily consumed one tasty treat after another—as evidenced by this compilation." Commenting on the performance of "Wish I Could Fly" at US radio, they opined: "[Do Roxette] still have the golden touch? If ["Wish I Could Fly"] is an accurate indicator, the answer is resoundingly positive. ... It looks like Roxette will be adding to that pile of much-deserved (if guilty pleasure) hits."

== Commercial performance ==
The album was an immediate commercial success throughout Europe, debuting at number three on Billboard's European Albums Chart. It was later certified platinum by the International Federation of the Phonographic Industry in 1996 for sales of over a million copies throughout Europe. The record topped the charts in Portugal, while reaching the top five in Austria, Denmark, Finland, Ireland, Scotland, Sweden, Switzerland, and the UK. In Germany, the record peaked at number seven, and was certified platinum by the BVMI for shipments in excess of 500,000 units. The album also peaked at number seven in Italy, and was one of the top 40 best-selling albums of the year. Don't Bore Us sold over 2 million copies worldwide within two months of release.

The record was also successful in Oceania, peaking in the top ten in both Japan and New Zealand. It was certified platinum in both countries for shipments in excess of 200,000 and 15,000 units, respectively. Conversely, the album initially had little impact on the ARIA Charts when it was released in Australia in late 1995, failing to enter the top 40 there. In mid-1996, some six months later, EMI Australia began to promote the album with a collection of TV commercials. The record would go on to peak in the top ten, and was certified double platinum by the ARIA for shipments in excess of 140,000 copies. It finished 1996 as the 35th best-selling album in the country.

=== North America ===
The original album was not released in the United States. However, it was released in Canada, where it peaked at number forty and was certified gold by Music Canada – then the Canadian Recording Industry Association – in 1996 for shipments in excess of 50,000 units. It was finally issued in the US in 2000, with an amended track listing: all of the new songs, aside from "You Don't Understand Me", were cut, along with the singles which were never released in the US (namely "The Big L." and "Vulnerable"). These were replaced by the fifth and final single from their third studio album Joyride (1991), "Church of Your Heart"—which reached number 36 on the Billboard 200 in 1992; as well as two singles from their then-most recent album, Have a Nice Day (1999): "Stars" and "Wish I Could Fly". The latter had reached number 24 on Billboard's Adult Contemporary and number 40 on Adult Pop Songs.

As of 2005, the album had sold over 78,000 copies in the US, with worldwide sales estimated at over 6 million copies.

== Track listing ==
All lyrics are written by Per Gessle, except "You Don't Understand Me" by Gessle and Desmond Child; all music is composed by Gessle, except "You Don't Understand Me" by Gessle and Child and "Listen to Your Heart", "Spending My Time" and "She Doesn't Live Here Anymore" by Gessle and Mats MP Persson.

No.	Title	Length
1.	"June Afternoon"	4:15
2.	"You Don't Understand Me"	4:28
3.	"The Look" (from Look Sharp!, 1988)	3:56
4.	"Dressed for Success" (US Single Mix; from Look Sharp!)	4:11
5.	"Listen to Your Heart" (Swedish Single Edit; from Look Sharp!)	5:14
6.	"Dangerous" (Single Version; from Look Sharp!)	3:48
7.	"It Must Have Been Love" (from the Pretty Woman soundtrack, 1990)	4:19
8.	"Joyride" (Single Edit; from Joyride, 1991)	4:02
9.	"Fading Like a Flower (Every Time You Leave)" (from Joyride)	3:53
10.	"The Big L." (from Joyride)	4:28
11.	"Spending My Time" (from Joyride)	4:38
12.	"How Do You Do!" (from Tourism, 1992)	3:12
13.	"Almost Unreal" (from the Super Mario Bros. soundtrack, 1993)	3:59
14.	"Sleeping in My Car" (Single Edit; from Crash! Boom! Bang!, 1994)	3:33
15.	"Crash! Boom! Bang!" (Single Edit; from Crash! Boom! Bang!)	4:25
16.	"Vulnerable" (Single Version; from Crash! Boom! Bang!)	4:30
17.	"She Doesn't Live Here Anymore"	4:03
18.	"I Don't Want to Get Hurt"	4:17
Total length:		75:11

Don't Bore Us - Get to the Chorus! Roxette's Greatest Hits – 2000 US release
No.	Title	Length
1.	"Wish I Could Fly" (from Have a Nice Day, 1999)	4:40
2.	"Stars" (from Have a Nice Day)	3:56
3.	"The Look"	3:56
4.	"Dressed for Success" (US Single Mix)	4:11
5.	"Listen to Your Heart" (Swedish Single Edit)	5:13
6.	"Dangerous" (Single Version)	3:47
7.	"It Must Have Been Love"	4:18
8.	"Joyride" (Single Edit)	3:59
9.	"Fading Like a Flower (Every Time You Leave)"	3:51
10.	"Spending My Time"	4:36
11.	"Church of Your Heart" (from Joyride, 1991)	3:16
12.	"How Do You Do!"	3:11
13.	"Almost Unreal"	3:57
14.	"Sleeping in My Car" (Single Edit)	3:32
15.	"Crash! Boom! Bang!" (Single Edit)	4:25
16.	"You Don't Understand Me"	4:27
Total length:		65:15

== Personnel ==
Credits adapted from the liner notes of Don't Bore Us, Get to the Chorus! Roxette's Greatest Hits.

- Roxette are Per Gessle and Marie Fredriksson
- Recorded at Tits & Ass Studio in Halmstad, Sweden; EMI Studios, Audio Sweden, Polar Studios and Studio Stacken in Stockholm, Sweden; Mayfair Studios in London, England and Capri Digital Studios in Capri, Italy between 1987 and August 1995.
- All songs produced by Clarence Öfwerman, except "She Doesn't Live Here Anymore" by Per Gessle and Michael Ilbert
- All songs published by Jimmy Fun Music, except "You Don't Understand Me" by Jimmy Fun Music/EMI Songs
- Mastered by George Marino at Sterling Sound Studios, New York City

Musicians

- Marie Fredriksson – lead and background vocals, piano, keyboards and liner notes
- Per Gessle – lead and background vocals, acoustic and electric guitars, Benny-piano, kazoo, whistling, tambourine, mixing and liner notes
- Per "Pelle" Alsing – drums and percussion
- Micke "Syd" Andersson – drums and tambourine
- Vicki Benckert – background vocals
- Anders Herrlin – background vocals, bass guitar, synthesizer, engineering and programming
- Mats Holmquist – string arrangements and conducting
- Jonas Isacsson – acoustic and electric guitars and harmonica
- Henrik Janson – talkbox
- Christer Jansson – hi-hat and percussion
- Jarl "Jalle" Lorensson – harmonica
- Clarence Öfwerman – backing vocals, keyboards, Synclavier, string and horn arrangements, programming and mixing
- Staffan Öfwerman – background vocals
- Jan "Janne" Oldaeus – electric guitar
- Mats "MP" Persson – acoustic and electric guitars, engineering and mixing
- Per "Pelle" Sirén – electric guitar
- Stockholms Nya Kammarorkester (credited as SNYKO) – strings
- Alar Suurna – tambourine, engineering and mixing
- Sveriges Radios Symfoniorkester – woodwind quartet

Technical

- Kjell Andersson – sleeve design
- Humberto Gatica – mixing (track 7)
- Michael Ilbert – engineering and mixing (tracks 1, 2, 17 and 18)
- Sven Lindström – liner notes
- Jonas Linell – photography
- Chris Lord-Alge – mixing (track 4)
- Björn Norén – engineering (tracks 1 and 18)

== Charts ==
=== Weekly charts ===
Chart (1995–2026)	Peak; position
Australian Albums (ARIA)	10
Austrian Albums (Ö3 Austria)	4
Belgian Albums (Ultratop Flanders)	4
Belgian Albums (Ultratop Wallonia)	13
Canadian Albums (RPM)	40
Croatian International Albums (HDU)	6
Danish Albums (Hitlisten)	3
Dutch Albums (Album Top 100)	12
European Albums (Billboard)	3
Finnish Albums (Suomen virallinen lista)	2
French Compilation Albums (SNEP)	20
German Albums (Offizielle Top 100)	7
Hungarian Albums (MAHASZ)	23
Italian Albums (FIMI)	7
Irish Albums (IRMA)	5
Japanese Albums (Oricon)	19
New Zealand Albums (RMNZ)	8
Norwegian Albums (VG-lista)	14
Portuguese Albums (AFP)	1
Scottish Albums (OCC)	5
Spanish Albums (Promúsicae)	7
Swedish Albums (Sverigetopplistan)	2
Swiss Albums (Schweizer Hitparade)	2
UK Albums (Official Charts)	5

=== Year-end charts ===
Chart (1995)	Position
Belgian Albums (Ultratop Flanders)	26
Dutch Albums (MegaCharts)	64
German Albums (GfK)	98
Italian Albums (FIMI)	37
UK Albums (OCC)	50

Chart (1996)	Position
Australian Albums (ARIA)	35

== Certifications and sales ==
Region	Certification	Certified units/sales
Argentina (CAPIF)	Gold	30,000^{^}
Australia (ARIA)	2× Platinum	140,000^{^}
Austria (IFPI Austria)	Gold	25,000^{*}
Belgium (BRMA)	Platinum	50,000^{*}
Brazil (Pro-Música Brasil)	Platinum	250,000^{*}
Canada (Music Canada)	Gold	50,000^{^}
Finland (Musiikkituottajat)	Platinum	45,149
Germany (BVMI)	Platinum	500,000^{^}
Italy	—	200,000
Japan (RIAJ)	Gold	100,000^{^}
Netherlands (NVPI)	Gold	50,000^{^}
New Zealand (RMNZ)	Platinum	15,000^{^}
Poland (ZPAV)	Platinum	100,000^{*}
Spain (Promusicae)	2× Platinum	200,000^{^}
Sweden (GLF)	3× Platinum	300,000^{^}
Switzerland (IFPI Switzerland)	Platinum	50,000^{^}
United Kingdom (BPI)	Platinum	300,000^{^}
United States	—	78,000
Summaries
Europe (IFPI)	Platinum	1,000,000^{*}
Worldwide	—	6,000,000
^{*} Sales figures based on certification alone.^{^} Shipments figures based on certification alone.
