= Crash! Boom! Bang! Tour =

1994–95 concert tour by Roxette

- World tour by Roxette
- Promotional poster for 15 November 1994 concert at the Royal Highland Centre
- Associated album: Crash! Boom! Bang!
- Start date: 6 September 1994
- End date: 2 May 1995
- Legs: 6
- No. of shows: 48 in Europe; 14 in Asia; 9 in Latin America; 8 in Australia; 4 in Africa; 81 total

Roxette concert chronology
- Join the Summer Joyride! Tour (1991–92); Crash! Boom! Bang! Tour (1994–95); Room Service Tour (2001)

The "Crash! Boom! Bang! World Tour" was the fourth concert tour by Swedish pop music duo Roxette, launched in support of their fifth studio album Crash! Boom! Bang! (1994).

== Box office and commercial recordings ==
The "Crash! Boom! Bang! Tour" saw the band performing to over one million people during its eighty-plus concerts throughout Europe, South Africa, Australia, Asia and Latin America from September 1994 until May 1995. It saw Roxette becoming one of the first international acts to perform in territories which, in the mid-90s, were not seen as touring markets, including Indonesia, Singapore, Thailand, the Philippines and China, as well as Costa Rica, Venezuela, Chile, Peru and Russia. These concerts attracted some criticism from the European music press – particularly in Sweden – who accused the band of exploiting the people of those countries for financial gain.

Per Gessle dismissed these claims, saying: "There's been some irritation over us going to Beijing and Moscow but, I don't know, we have lots of fans everywhere—we do this for our fans, we don't do it for the money because there's no money there", conceding: "We're not going to be the generation of artists that's gonna, you know, 'cash-in' from the Chinese people. That belongs to the future [generation of artists]." Marie Fredriksson argued: "I get so pissed off with all these people who don't understand that this is a really good thing we are doing. It's for the fans, of course it's for us too, because we learn so much. It's not like 'We have to go. It's a big market. We can sell a lot of albums there.'"

They became the second act to tour in post-Apartheid South Africa, playing four shows to 65,000 people in stadiums throughout the country in January 1995. Whitney Houston was the first act to tour there, and her shows the previous month had been plagued by organisational issues: thousands of ticket holders were unable to find their seats and, due in part to poor security, hundreds of concertgoers were openly robbed outside Johannesburg's Ellis Park Stadium. In contrast, Roxette's four concerts in the country passed off without incident, which was instrumental in other international acts deciding to perform there soon after—specifically The Rolling Stones and Phil Collins. Their 14 January 1995 show at Johannesburg's Ellis Park Stadium was filmed for the live video Crash! Boom! Live!.

Rarities, a compilation of previously released b-sides, demos and remixes, was issued exclusively in Latin America and Southeast Asia, with its release timed to coincide with dates of the tour. On 19 February 1995, Roxette performed to over 15,000 people at the Workers Indoor Arena in Beijing. The procedure to get permission for this concert had taken over a year, and included self-censoring the lyrics of "Sleeping in My Car", of which Gessle said: "We agreed, but didn't change them in the end." This made Roxette the first Western act to be allowed to perform in China since Wham! in 1985.

Two months later, on 8 April, they performed the first of two scheduled concerts at Buenos Aires' Estadio Ricardo Etcheverry – then called the Ferrocarrill Oeste Stadium – to a sold-out crowd of over 30,000 fans. Approximately 150 attendees were treated for minor injuries at the venue, however, after a reported crowd rush toward the stage during the concert. The second concert the following night was cancelled over security concerns. The tour concluded on 2 May 1995 in Moscow, with Roxette becoming the first act since 1917 to hold a concert on that date—a public holiday in Russia. In 2008, the duo were ordered to pay SEK 4.5 million (approximately US $500,000) in unpaid taxes to the Swedish Tax Agency, for money earned during the German dates of the tour. In court papers, it was alleged that Gessle and Fredriksson paid the revenue into their joint production company, instead of declaring it as taxable income.

== Set list ==
This set list is representative of the tour's second show on 9 September 1994 at the Globen Arena in Stockholm. It does not represent all dates throughout the tour.

1. "Sleeping in My Car"
2. "Fireworks"
3. "Almost Unreal"
4. "Dangerous"
5. "So You Want to Be a Rock 'n' Roll Star" (The Byrds cover)
6. "Crash! Boom! Bang!"
7. "Listen to Your Heart"
8. "The First Girl on the Moon"
9. "Harleys & Indians (Riders in the Sky)"
10. "Lies"
11. "The Rain"
12. "I Love the Sound Of Crashing Guitars"^{[a]}
13. "It Must Have Been Love"
14. "Fading Like a Flower (Every Time You Leave)"
15. "Dressed for Success"
16. "The Big L."
17. "Spending My Time"
18. "Cry"
19. "Hanging on the Telephone" (The Nerves cover)
20. "The Look"
21. "Love Is All (Shine Your Light on Me)"
22. "Joyride"

Notes

- ^{^[a]} "I Love the Sound of Crashing Guitars" was played up until the end of 1994. From the South African shows onwards, it was replaced on the set by "Run to You".

== Tour dates ==
List of concerts, showing date, city, country, venue and opening act
| Date | City | Country | Venue | Opening act |
Europe
| 6 September 1994 | Helsinki | Finland | Jäähalli | Brainpool |
| 9 September 1994 | Stockholm | Sweden | Globen Arena | Brainpool |
| 10 September 1994 | Norrköping | Sweden | Himmelstalundshallen | Brainpool |
| 12 September 1994 | Copenhagen | Denmark | Valby-Hallen | Brainpool |
| 13 September 1994 | Halmstad | Sweden | Halmstad Arena | Brainpool |
| 14 September 1994 | Oslo | Norway | Oslo Spektrum | Brainpool |
| 16 September 1994 | Karlskoga | Sweden | Nobelhallen | Brainpool |
| 17 September 1994 | Jönköping | Sweden | Jönköping Concert Hall | Brainpool |
| 18 September 1994 | Gothenburg | Sweden | Scandinavium | Brainpool |
| 20 September 1994 | Rotterdam | Netherlands | Rotterdam Ahoy | Brainpool |
| 21 September 1994 | Rotterdam | Netherlands | Rotterdam Ahoy | Brainpool |
| 23 September 1994 | Kiel | Germany | Sparkassen-Arena | Brainpool |
| 24 September 1994 | Bielefeld | Germany | Seidenstickerhalle | Brainpool |
| 25 September 1994 | Bremen | Germany | ÖVB Arena | Brainpool |
| 6 October 1994 | Berlin | Germany | Deutschlandhalle | Brainpool |
| 7 October 1994 | Berlin | Germany | Deutschlandhalle | Brainpool |
| 8 October 1994 | Halle | Germany | Eissporthalle | Brainpool |
| 10 October 1994 | Cologne | Germany | Sporthalle | Brainpool |
| 12 October 1994 | Munich | Germany | Olympiahalle | Brainpool |
| 13 October 1994 | Munich | Germany | Olympiahalle | Brainpool |
| 15 October 1994 | Mannheim | Germany | Maimarkthalle | Brainpool |
| 18 October 1994 | Frankfurt | Germany | Festhalle Frankfurt | Brainpool |
| 19 October 1994 | Memmingen | Germany | Eissporthalle | Brainpool |
| 21 October 1994 | Stuttgart | Germany | Hanns-Martin-Schleyer-Halle | Brainpool |
| 22 October 1994 | Stuttgart | Germany | Hanns-Martin-Schleyer-Halle | Brainpool |
| 24 October 1994 | Hamburg | Germany | Alsterdorfer Sporthalle | Brainpool |
| 25 October 1994 | Hamburg | Germany | Alsterdorfer Sporthalle | Brainpool |
| 26 October 1994 | Prague | Czech Republic | Tipsport Arena | Brainpool |
| 27 October 1994 | Prague | Czech Republic | Tipsport Arena | Brainpool |
| 9 November 1994 | London | England | Wembley Arena | Brainpool |
| 11 November 1994 | Dublin | Ireland | Point Depot | Brainpool |
| 14 November 1994 | Sheffield | England | Sheffield Arena | Brainpool |
| 15 November 1994 | Edinburgh | Scotland | Royal Highland Centre | Brainpool |
| 17 November 1994 | Birmingham | England | National Exhibition Centre | Brainpool |
| 18 November 1994 | Brussels | Belgium | Forest National | Brainpool |
| 19 November 1994 | Brussels | Belgium | Forest National | Brainpool |
| 21 November 1994 | Zürich | Switzerland | Hallenstadion | Brainpool |
| 22 November 1994 | Lausanne | Switzerland | Halle des Fêtes | Brainpool |
| 25 November 1994 | Innsbruck | Austria | OlympiaWorld Innsbruck | Brainpool |
| 26 November 1994 | Vienna | Austria | Wiener Stadthalle | Brainpool |
| 28 November 1994 | Dortmund | Germany | Westfalenhalle | Brainpool |
| 29 November 1994 | Hanover | Germany | Hannover Messe | Brainpool |
| 1 December 1994 | Barcelona | Spain | Palau Sant Jordi | Brainpool |
| 2 December 1994 | Madrid | Spain | Palacio de Deportes | Brainpool |
| 3 December 1994 | Madrid | Spain | Palacio de Deportes | Brainpool |
| 4 December 1994 | San Sebastián | Spain | Velódromo de Anoeta | Brainpool |
South Africa
| 6 January 1995 | Durban | South Africa | Kings Park Stadium | |
| 9 January 1995 | Port Elizabeth | South Africa | St. George's Stadium | |
| 11 January 1995 | Cape Town | South Africa | Green Point Stadium | |
| 14 January 1995 | Johannesburg | South Africa | Ellis Park Stadium | |
Australia
| 18 January 1995 | Perth | Australia | Perth Entertainment Centre | |
| 21 January 1995 | Sydney | Australia | Sydney Entertainment Centre | |
| 25 January 1995 | Newcastle | Australia | Newcastle Entertainment Centre | |
| 27 January 1995 | Brisbane | Australia | Brisbane Entertainment Centre | |
| 29 January 1995 | Canberra | Australia | National Convention Centre | |
| 31 January 1995 | Adelaide | Australia | Adelaide Entertainment Centre | |
| 1 February 1995 | Melbourne | Australia | Melbourne Entertainment Centre | |
| 2 February 1995 | Melbourne | Australia | Melbourne Entertainment Centre | |
Asia
| 6 February 1995 | Jakarta | Indonesia | Jakarta Convention Center | |
| 8 February 1995 | Kallang | Singapore | Singapore Indoor Stadium | |
| 10 February 1995 | Hong Kong | Hong Kong | Queen Elizabeth Stadium | |
| 12 February 1995 | Bangkok | Thailand | Queen Sirikit National Convention Center | |
| 14 February 1995 | Manila | Philippines | Folk Arts Theater | |
| 16 February 1995 | Taipei | Taiwan | Taipei County Stadium | |
| 19 February 1995 | Beijing | China | Workers Indoor Arena | |
| 22 February 1995 | Tokyo | Japan | Nakano Sun Plaza | |
| 23 February 1995 | Tokyo | Japan | Nakano Sun Plaza | |
| 24 February 1995 | Sendai | Japan | Sendai Sun Plaza | |
| 26 February 1995 | Tokyo | Japan | Kōsei Nenkin Kaikan | |
| 27 February 1995 | Osaka | Japan | Osaka Festival Hall | |
| 28 February 1995 | Fukuoka | Japan | Fukuoka Sunpalace | |
| 2 March 1995 | Yokohama | Japan | Kanagawa Kenmin Hall | |
Latin America
| 22 March 1995 | Heredia | Costa Rica | Palacio de los Deportes | |
| 24 March 1995 | Caracas | Venezuela | Poliedro de Caracas | |
| 27 March 1995 | São Paulo | Brazil | Olímpia | |
| 28 March 1995 | São Paulo | Brazil | Olímpia | |
| 30 March 1995 | Rio de Janeiro | Brazil | Metropolitan | |
| 31 March 1995 | Rio de Janeiro | Brazil | Metropolitan | |
| 2 April 1995 | Santiago | Chile | Teatro Caupolicán | |
| 5 April 1995 | Lima | Peru | Colegio Roosevelt | |
| 8 April 1995 | Buenos Aires | Argentina | Ricardo Etcheverry Stadium | |
Russia
| 1 May 1995 | Moscow | Russia | Olympic Stadium | |
| 2 May 1995 | Moscow | Russia | Olympic Stadium | |

== Cancelled dates ==
List of cancelled concerts, showing date, city, country and venue
| Date | City | Country | Venue |
|---|---|---|---|
| 5 September 1994 | St. Petersburg | Russia | —N/a |
| 8 November 1994 | London | England | Wembley Arena |
| 12 November 1994 | Dublin | Ireland | Point Depot |
| 17 January 1995 | Perth | Australia | Perth Entertainment Centre |
| 22 January 1995 | Sydney | Australia | Sydney Entertainment Centre |
| 23 January 1995 | Sydney | Australia | Sydney Entertainment Centre |
| 3 February 1995 | Melbourne | Australia | Melbourne Entertainment Centre |
| 9 April 1995 | Buenos Aires | Argentina | Ricardo Etcheverry Stadium |

== Personnel ==
Personnel taken from the credits of the 1995 tour documentary Really Roxette.

Musicians

- Marie Fredriksson – vocals, electric guitar, piano
- Per Gessle – vocals, rhythm guitar, harmonica
- Per "Pelle" Alsing – drums and percussion
- Mikael "Nord" Andersson – electric and pedal steel guitars
- Anders Herrlin – bass
- Jonas Isacsson – acoustic and electric guitars
- Clarence Öfwerman – keyboards
- Mats Persson – drums and percussion

Management

- Dave Edwards – tour manager
- Åsa Gessle – PA to Per Gessle
- Bo Johansson – security
- Thomas Johansson – tour management
- Bill Leabody – production manager
- Tor Nielsen – tour coordinator

Production

- Fredrik All – stage carpenter
- Mattias Dalin – sound engineer
- Lisa Derkert – wardrobe
- Lars Jungmark – monitor engineer
- Pontus Lagerbielke – lighting designer
- Max Lökholm – guitar technician
- Anders Mikkelsen – guitar technician
- Stefan Rubensson – guitar technician
- Mats Wennersten – keyboard technician
