= Crash Boom Bang =

Crash Boom Bang may refer to:

- Crash! Boom! Bang!, a 1994 album by Roxette
  - Crash! Boom! Bang! (song), a song
  - Crash! Boom! Bang! Tour, 1994–1995 concert tour
- Crash Boom Bang!, a 2006 video game
- Crash Boom Bang (band), an American pop rock band
