= Vulnerable (Roxette song) =

1995 single by Roxette

Single by Roxette

from the album Crash! Boom! Bang! and Rarities
- B-side: "The Sweet Hello, The Sad Goodbye"
- Released: March 1995
- Recorded: April 1993
- Studio: Mayfair (London, England)
- Genre: Alternative pop
- Length: 5:03 (album version); 4:30 (single edit)
- Label: EMI
- Songwriter: Per Gessle
- Producer: Clarence Öfwerman

Roxette singles chronology
"Run to You" (1994)	"Vulnerable" (1995)	"You Don't Understand Me" (1995)

Music video
- "Vulnerable" on YouTube

"Vulnerable" is a song by Swedish pop music duo Roxette, released in March 1995 by EMI Records as the fifth and final single from their fifth studio album, Crash! Boom! Bang! (1994), while simultaneously acting as the lead single from the duo's 1995 compilation album, Rarities. It was written by Per Gessle and produced by Clarence Öfwerman, peaking at number 12 in Sweden. The accompanying music video was directed by Jonas Åkerlund.

"The Sweet Hello, The Sad Goodbye" had previously been released as the B-side on the duo's 1991 single "Spending My Time". Earlier that year, in April, it had been released as the lead single from Thomas Anders' (of Modern Talking fame) second solo album, Whispers.

== Composition and style ==
The song was written by Per Gessle in December 1990, although it would not be recorded by the band until April 1993 at Mayfair Studios in London. In the liner notes of their 1995 greatest hits compilation Don't Bore Us, Get to the Chorus!, Gessle indicated that the song was "written a week too late for the Joyride album and it didn't really suit the Tourism sessions, so we kept it in the drawer until we started the Crash!-project in London."

According to Ultimate Guitar, the track is an alternative pop ballad with a moderate tempo of 134 beats per minute. The verse is composed of two repetitions of an E–G♯m–A–F♯m–B sequence, with the final note amended to a C♯ on the second repetition. The chorus consists of three repetitions of a F♯–F♯maj7–B–C♯ sequence, followed by one shortened bar of F♯–C♯–F♯.

== Critical reception ==
AllMusic editor Bryan Buss described the song as "apathetic". Music Week gave it two out of five, noting that "Per Gessle takes over vocal dutied for the new ballad from the Swedish duo." Ian McCann from NME wrote, "She's coloured all the secrets of my soul, sings Sven or whatever he's called. Ah, soul."

== Commercial performance ==
"Vulnerable" became the second-biggest hit from the parent album in the duo's native country, peaking at number 12 and spending almost three months on the Swedish Singles Chart. Although lead single "Sleeping in My Car" debuted at number one in Sweden, the title track stalled at number 17, and "Fireworks" spent a sole week on the chart, peaking at number 34. The album's fourth single, "Run to You", became the duo's first single since 1988's "I Call Your Name" to not enter the Swedish top fifty.

The song spent almost three months on the German Singles Chart, eventually peaking at number 71 on its sixth week. In the UK, "Vulnerable" peaked at number 44, ending a run of seventeen consecutive top forty singles on the UK Singles Chart. It performed marginally better in Scotland, peaking at number 41.

== Music video ==
The music video for "Vulnerable" was directed by Swedish director Jonas Åkerlund.

== Track listings ==
All songs were written by Per Gessle.

- 7-inch single and cassette (Australia 8651514 · UK TCEM369)
1. "Vulnerable" (Single Edit) – 4:30
2. "The Sweet Hello, The Sad Goodbye" – 4:49
- CD single (Australia · Europe 8651522)
1. "Vulnerable" – 4:30
2. "The Sweet Hello, The Sad Goodbye" – 4:49
3. "Vulnerable" (Demo, 28 December 1990) – 4:44
4. "I'm Sorry" (Demo, 18 August 1993) – 3:25
- UK CD single (CDEM369)
1. "Vulnerable" – 4:30
2. "The Sweet Hello, The Sad Goodbye" – 4:49
3. "Vulnerable" (Demo, 28 December 1990) – 4:44

== Personnel ==
Personnel are adapted from the liner notes of Don't Bore Us, Get to the Chorus!

- Per Gessle – lead and background vocals, mixing
- Marie Fredriksson – background vocals
- Jonas Isacsson – acoustic and electric guitars
- Anders Herrlin – programming, engineering
- Mats Holmquist – string arrangement, conducting
- Clarence Öfwerman – keyboards, programming, string arrangement, production, mixing
- Alar Suurna – engineering, mixing
- Stockholms Nya Kammarorkester (credited as SNYKO) – orchestration

== Charts ==
Chart (1995)	Peak position
Germany (GfK)	71
Europe (European Hit Radio)	28
Iceland (Íslenski Listinn Topp 40)	20
Scotland Singles (OCC)	41
Sweden (Sverigetopplistan)	12
UK Singles (OCC)	44
UK Airplay (Music Week)	40

== Release history ==
Region	Date	Format(s)	Label(s)	Ref.
Europe	March 1995	CD	EMI	
United Kingdom	27 March 1995	7-inch vinyl; CD; cassette	EMI	
