= She Doesn't Live Here Anymore =

Single by Roxette

from the album Don't Bore Us, Get to the Chorus! Roxette's Greatest Hits
- B-side: "The Look '95"
- Released: 22 April 1996
- Recorded: July 1995
- Genre: Power pop
- Length: 4:03
- Songwriters: Per Gessle; Mats Persson
- Producers: Gessle; Michael Ilbert

Roxette singles chronology
"June Afternoon" (1996)	"She Doesn't Live Here Anymore" (1996)	"Un Día Sin Ti" (1996)

Music video
- "She Doesn't Live Here Anymore" on YouTube

"She Doesn't Live Here Anymore" is a song by Roxette, released as the fourth and final single from their greatest hits compilation Don't Bore Us, Get to the Chorus! Roxette's Greatest Hits (1995). The song had originally been written and recorded for the duo's 1994 studio album Crash! Boom! Bang! but, according to Marie Fredriksson, that version "sounded really tired", and has yet to be released. It was later re-recorded in July 1995 with members of Per Gessle's former band Gyllene Tider. It is the only song in Roxette's discography to not be produced by Clarence Öfwerman. "She Doesn't Live Here Anymore" was only released in Germany, Italy and the Netherlands, also in Hungary, in the Czech Republic peaking at number 86 on the German Singles Chart. The single included two remixed versions of "The Look" as b-sides. Its music video was directed by Jonas Åkerlund.

== Formats and track listings ==
All songs written by Per Gessle, except "She Doesn't Live Here Anymore" lyrics by Gessle, music by Gessle and Mats "MP" Persson.

- CD Single (Europe 8652332)
1. "She Doesn't Live Here Anymore" – 4:03
2. "The Look '95" (Chaps 1995 Remix) – 5:08
3. "The Look" (Rapino 7" Remix) – 4:10

== Personnel ==
Credits adapted from the liner notes of Don't Bore Us, Get to the Chorus! Roxette's Greatest Hits.

- Recorded at Polar Studios, Stockholm in July 1995

Musicians

- Micke "Syd" Andersson – drums and tambourine
- Per Gessle – lead and background vocals, Benny-piano, tambourine, production and mixing
- Anders Herrlin – bass guitar and synthesizer
- Michael Ilbert – engineering, production and mixing
- Mats "MP" Persson – acoustic and electric guitars

== Charts ==
Chart (1996)	Peak position
Germany (GfK)	86
Hungary (Mahasz)	10
