= Fingertips '93 =

1993 single by Roxette

Single by Roxette

from the album Tourism
- Released: 26 January 1993
- Recorded: May; December 1992
- Studio: Nas Nuvens (Rio de Janeiro, Brazil); EMI (Stockholm, Sweden)
- Length: 3:42
- Label: EMI
- Songwriter(s): Per Gessle
- Producer(s): Clarence Öfwerman

Roxette singles chronology
"Queen of Rain" (1992)	"Fingertips '93" (1993)	"Almost Unreal" (1993)

Music video
- "Fingertips '93" on YouTube

"Fingertips '93" is a song by Swedish pop duo Roxette, released as the third and final single from their fourth studio album, Tourism (1992), on 26 January 1993. The single was only released in a select few countries, including Belgium, Germany, the Netherlands, Sweden and Spain, and charted moderately. The song would be given a wider release when it was issued as one of the B-sides on the duo's proceeding single, "Almost Unreal", which was released four months later in May 1993.

== Music video ==
The music video was Roxette's first collaboration with director Jonas Åkerlund, who would go on to direct a total of twelve music videos for the duo.

== Formats and track listings ==
All music and lyrics were written by Per Gessle, except "Hotblooded", with music composed by Marie Fredriksson and Gessle.

- 7-inch single and cassette (Europe 8650237)
1. "Fingertips '93" – 3:42
2. "Dressed for Success" (live from the Sydney Entertainment Centre on 13 December 1991) – 4:49
- CD single (Australia · Europe 8650222)
1. "Fingertips '93" – 3:42
2. "Dressed for Success" (live from Sydney) – 4:49
3. "Hotblooded" (live from Sydney) – 3:55
4. "The Voice" – 4:27

== Credits and personnel ==
Credits and personnel adapted from the liner notes of Tourism and Rarities.

Studios

- Original album version recorded in May 1992 at Nas Nevans Recording Studio (Rio de Janeiro, Brazil)
- Single version remixed in December 1992 at EMI Studios (Stockholm, Sweden)

Personnel

- Marie Fredriksson – lead and backing vocals
- Per Gessle – lead vocals, acoustic guitar, programming, mixing
- Per "Pelle" Alsing – drums
- Dave Edwards – psychedelic voice (single version)
- Anders Herrlin – bass guitar, engineering and programming
- Jonas Isacsson – acoustic and electric guitars, mandolin
- Clarence Öfwerman – keyboards, production, mixing
- Staffan Öfwerman – backing vocals
- Alar Suurna – percussion, engineering, mixing

Technical

- Paulo Junqueiro – engineering
- Antoine Midani – assistant engineering

== Charts ==
Chart (1993)	Peak position
Belgium (Ultratop 50 Flanders)	29
Germany (GfK)	45
Netherlands (Dutch Top 40 Tipparade)	2
Netherlands (Single Top 100)	32
Sweden (Sverigetopplistan)	39
Spain (AFYVE)	30
