= Jonas Åkerlund =

Swedish director

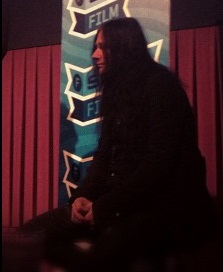
- Åkerlund in March 2012
- Born: Hans Uno Jonas Åkerlund; 10 November 1965 (age 60); Bromma, Sweden
- Occupation: Filmmaker
- Years active: 1983–present
- Spouse: Bea Åkerlund

Hans Uno Jonas Åkerlund (Swedish: [hɑːns ˈʉ̌ːnʊ ˈjûːnas ˈôːkɛˌɭɵnd]; born 10 November 1965) is a Swedish filmmaker and musician who is best known for his work in music videos. Åkerlund was a member of the Swedish black metal band Bathory. According to Jillian Drachman of Metal Injection, "many people do not know that Jonas Åkerlund is a musician."

He has directed well-known videos for artists such as Queens of the Stone Age, Christina Aguilera, Taylor Swift, Beyoncé, Blink-182, Blondie, Duran Duran, Lady Gaga, David Guetta, Jamiroquai, Kesha, Lenny Kravitz, Madonna, Paul McCartney, Metallica, Moby, Ozzy Osbourne, P!nk, the Prodigy, the Smashing Pumpkins, Rammstein, Britney Spears, the Rolling Stones, U2, Robbie Williams and Ghost.

Åkerlund's video for Madonna's song "Ray of Light" won the Grammy Award for Best Short Form Music Video and a record five MTV Video Music Awards, including Video of the Year. In 2008, he won the Grammy Award for Best Music Film for directing Madonna's The Confessions Tour DVD, and won the award again in 2014 for his work on Paul McCartney's Live Kisses DVD. He also directed the films Spun (2002), Horsemen (2009), Small Apartments (2012), Lords of Chaos (2018), and Polar (2019).

== Career ==
Åkerlund was a member of the Swedish black metal band Bathory from 1983 to 1984. He directed Candlemass' first music video "Bewitched", which was also his debut as a music video director. He then became the main video director for Roxette. In 1997, he directed the video for the Prodigy's "Smack My Bitch Up", which sparked controversy due to its depiction of drug use, violence, and nudity. In 1998, he worked with Madonna on the song "Ray of Light". He directed the music video for the Smashing Pumpkins' song "Try, Try, Try", from which a short film entitled Try was spawned. He was also the designer and photographer for the Roxette album Room Service in 2001. His first full-length film, Spun, depicting three days in the lives of Methamphetamine addicts, debuted in 2002.

Åkerlund directed commercials for Swedish clothing retailer MQ and the re-imagining of the Devo song "Watch Us Work It" used in Dell Computers commercials. He is a long-time collaborator of Madonna, having worked on such music videos as "Music", "American Life" (which was pulled due to its graphic content and the Iraq War), and "Jump". He also directed the documentary film I'm Going to Tell You a Secret about Madonna and her concert special The Confessions Tour: Live from London.

Åkerlund's other work includes the controversial music video for Rammstein's "Pussy", the video for the song "Telephone" by Lady Gaga and Beyoncé, "Moves like Jagger" by Maroon 5 and Christina Aguilera, and Duran Duran's single "Girl Panic!" In 2009, Åkerlund's second film, the psychological thriller Horseman, had a limited release before going to home video.

Åkerlund's third movie, Small Apartments (2012), went direct to DVD. Per Gessle, of Roxette, was credited for the music and soundtrack. In 2018, Åkerlund's fourth film, Lords of Chaos, premiered at Sundance Film Festival in Park City, Utah, receiving its wide release the next year. The film is adapted from the 1998 book of the same name, and is a historical fiction account of the 1990s Norwegian black metal scene, told from the perspective of Mayhem co-founder Euronymous.

In 2019, Åkerlund released his fifth film on the streaming service Netflix, Polar, an action-noir film starring Mads Mikkelsen based on the graphic novel.

== Videography ==
1988

"Bewitched" for Candlemass

1989

"What's the Noise?" for Walk on Water

1992

"Shame, Shame, Shame" for Izabella Scorupco
"Så länge det lyser mittemot" for Marie Fredriksson (Female half of Roxette)
"Mellan sommar och höst" for Marie Fredriksson

1993

"Fingertips '93" for Roxette

1994

"Run to You" for Roxette

1995

"A la ronde" for Sinclair
"Vulnerable" for Roxette
"Pay for Me" for Whale

1996

"Rainbow" for Meja
"June Afternoon" for Roxette
"She Doesn't Live Here Anymore" for Roxette
"Un Dia Sin Ti" for Roxette (Spanish version of "Spending My Time")

1997

"Do You Wanna Be My Baby?" for Per Gessle (Male half of Roxette)
"James Bond Theme" for Moby
"Kix" for Per Gessle
"I Want You To Know" for Per Gessle
"Smack My Bitch Up" for the Prodigy

1998

"Ray of Light" for Madonna

(Won the 1999 Grammy Award for Best Short Form Music Video)

"My Favourite Game" for the Cardigans
"Turn the Page" for Metallica

1999

"Whiskey in the Jar" for Metallica
"Wish I Could Fly" for Roxette
"Canned Heat" for Jamiroquai
"Anyone" for Roxette
"Corruption" for Iggy Pop

2000

"The Everlasting Gaze" for the Smashing Pumpkins
"Music" for Madonna
"Porcelain" (version 1) for Moby
"Try, Try, Try" for the Smashing Pumpkins
"Beautiful Day" (version 1: airport) for U2
"Black Jesus" for Everlast
"Still" (version 2: white hair) for Macy Gray

2001

"Gets Me Through" for Ozzy Osbourne
"Walk On" for U2
"The Centre of the Heart" for Roxette
"Circus" for Stina Nordenstam

2002

"A Thing About You" for Roxette
"Lonely Road" for Paul McCartney
"Fuel for Hatred" for Satyricon
"Me Julie" for Ali G and Shaggy
"If I Could Fall in Love" for Lenny Kravitz
"Beautiful" for Christina Aguilera

2003

"Opportunity Nox" for Roxette (co-directed with Kristoffer Diös)
"American Life" for Madonna
"Good Boys" for Blondie
"Aim 4" for Flint
"True Nature" for Jane's Addiction
"Come Undone" for Robbie Williams
"Sexed Up" for Robbie Williams
"Carnival Girl" for Texas

2004

"I Miss You" for blink-182
"Tits on the Radio" for Scissor Sisters (internet video only)

2005

"Rain Fall Down" for the Rolling Stones

2006

"Jump" for Madonna
"One Wish" for Roxette
"Mann gegen Mann" for Rammstein
"Country Girl" for Primal Scream

2007

"Wake Up Call" for Maroon 5
"Good God" for Anouk
"Same Mistake" for James Blunt
"Watch Us Work It" for Devo

2008

"No. 5" for Hollywood Undead
"Undead" for Hollywood Undead
"Sober" for Pink

2009

"Paparazzi" for Lady Gaga
"When Love Takes Over" for David Guetta feat. Kelly Rowland
"We Are Golden" for Mika
"Celebration" for Madonna
"Pussy" for Rammstein
"Fresh Out the Oven" for Jennifer Lopez and Pitbull
"Ich tu dir weh" for Rammstein

(Won the 2011 Echo for best video national)

2010

"Telephone" for Lady Gaga feat. Beyoncé
"Hot-n-Fun" for N.E.R.D feat. Nelly Furtado
"Let Me Hear You Scream" for Ozzy Osbourne
"Who's That Chick?" for David Guetta feat. Rihanna (Day Version)
"Who's That Chick?" for David Guetta feat. Rihanna (Night Version)
"One (Your Name)" for Swedish House Mafia feat. Pharrell

2011

"Hold It Against Me" for Britney Spears
"Hear Me Now" for Hollywood Undead
"Moves like Jagger" for Maroon 5 feat. Christina Aguilera
"Girl Panic!" for Duran Duran
"Mein Land" for Rammstein

2012

"Daylight" for Maroon 5
"Doom and Gloom" for the Rolling Stones

2013

"Haunted" for Beyoncé
"Superpower" for Beyoncé feat. Frank Ocean

2014

"Magic" for Coldplay
"Get Her Back" for Robin Thicke
"True Love" for Coldplay
"Dangerous" for David Guetta

2015

"Ghosttown" for Madonna
"Bitch I'm Madonna" for Madonna feat. Nicki Minaj
"RM486" for Rose McGowan feat. Punishment
"Could Have Been Me" for the Struts

2016

"New Romantics" for Taylor Swift
"Hold Up" for Beyoncé
"Óveður" for Sigur Rós
"Make America Great Again" for Pussy Riot
"ManUNkind" for Metallica

2017

"John Wayne" for Lady Gaga
"Praying" for Kesha
"The Way You Used to Do" for Queens of the Stone Age
"A Little Work" for Fergie
"You're the Best Thing About Me" for U2

2018

"Here Comes the Change" for Kesha

2019

"God Control" for Madonna
"Under the Graveyard" for Ozzy Osbourne

== Filmography ==
Feature films

Spun (2002)
Horsemen (2009)
Small Apartments (2012)
Lords of Chaos (2018)
Polar (2019)

Concert and documentary films

Madonna: I'm Going to Tell You a Secret (2005)
Madonna: The Confessions Tour (2007) (won the 2008 Grammy Award for Best Long Form Music Video)
Paul McCartney: Live Kisses (2012) (won the 2014 Grammy Award for Best Music Film)
On the Run Tour: Beyoncé and Jay Z (2014)
Taylor Swift: The 1989 World Tour Live (2015)
Roxette: Roxette Diaries (2016)
Rammstein: Paris (2017)
DuEls (2024)
Madonna – Made of the future (2024)
Madonna: The Celebration Tour in Rio (2024)
Metallica Saved My Life (2025)
Billy Idol Should Be Dead (2025)

Television

Clark (2022, TV series) (directed all 6 episodes with Kirke Ailio Rodwell as 1st Assistant Director)

== Awards ==
- 2014 – Grammy – Best Music Film: Paul McCartney's "Live Kisses"
- 2011 – Echo Awards – Best National Video: Rammstein "Ich tu dir weh"
- 2010 – MVPA Awards – Best Collaboration: Lady Gaga feat Beyoncé "Telephone"
- 2009 – MVPA Awards – Lady Gaga "Paparazzi"
- 2008 – MVPA Awards – James Blunt "Same Mistake"
- 2008 – Grammy – Best Long Form Music Video: Madonna NBC Special "The Confessions Tour"
- 2008 – Silver Addy – Dell "Work it Out"
- 2007 – MVPA Hall of Fame – Prodigy "Smack My Bitch Up"
- 2004 – MVPA Awards – Robbie Williams "Come Undone"
- 1999 – Grammy – Best Short Form Music Video: Madonna "Ray of Light"
- 1998 – MTV Video Music Award – Madonna "Ray of Light" (five awards: Video of the Year, Best Female Video, Best Director, Best Editing and Best Choreography - Jonas Åkerlund was also the editor and he and Madonna were the choreographers for this video)
- 1998 – MTV Video Music Award – Best Dance Video: The Prodigy "Smack My Bitch Up"
