= Super Mario Bros. (film) =

1993 film by Rocky Morton and Annabel Jankel

- Theatrical release poster by Steven Chorney
- Directed by: Rocky Morton; Annabel Jankel
- Written by: Parker Bennett; Terry Runté; Ed Solomon
- Based on: Mario by Nintendo
- Produced by: Jake Eberts; Roland Joffé
- Starring: Bob Hoskins; John Leguizamo; Dennis Hopper; Samantha Mathis; Fisher Stevens; Fiona Shaw; Richard Edson
- Cinematography: Dean Semler
- Edited by: Mark Goldblatt
- Music by: Alan Silvestri
- Production companies: Lightmotive; Allied Filmmakers; Cinergi Productions
- Distributed by: Buena Vista Pictures Distribution (United States) (Note: Distributed under the Hollywood Pictures banner.); Entertainment Film Distributors (United Kingdom)
- Release date: May 28, 1993
- Running time: 104 minutes
- Countries: United States; United Kingdom
- Language: English
- Budget: $42–48 million
- Box office: $38.9 million

Super Mario Bros. (also known as Super Mario Bros.: The Movie) is a 1993 science fantasy adventure film based on the Mario video game series by Nintendo. It was directed by the husband-and-wife team Rocky Morton and Annabel Jankel, written by Parker Bennett, Terry Runté and Ed Solomon and distributed by Buena Vista Pictures through Hollywood Pictures. The first American feature-length live-action film based on a video game, it follows the brothers Mario (Bob Hoskins) and Luigi (John Leguizamo) in their quest to rescue Princess Daisy (Samantha Mathis) from a dystopian parallel universe ruled by the ruthless President Koopa (Dennis Hopper).

Development began after the producer, Roland Joffé, obtained the Mario rights. Given free creative license by Nintendo, which believed the Mario brand was strong enough for experimentation, the screenwriters envisioned Super Mario Bros. as a subversive comedy influenced by Ghostbusters (1984) and The Wizard of Oz (1939). Its dinosaur theme was inspired by the most recent Mario game, Super Mario World (1990), with other elements drawn from fairy tales and contemporary American culture. Filming took place from May to July 1992. The production used several techniques considered innovative in the transition from practical to digital visual effects, including the use of Autodesk Flame.

Released on May 28, 1993, Super Mario Bros. was a financial failure, grossing $38.9 million worldwide on a budget of $42–48 million. It received generally negative reviews from critics and is considered one of the worst films ever made. Despite this, it has developed a cult following. Nintendo did not license another Mario film until The Super Mario Bros. Movie, an animated film released by Universal Pictures in 2023, which received mixed reviews and was a commercial success, breaking multiple box-office records.

== Plot ==
Following the impact of a meteorite into Earth 65 million years ago, the universe is split into a pair of parallel dimensions. Surviving dinosaurs escape into the new dimension, evolving into a humanoid race and founding a city known as Dinohattan. In 1973, a mysterious woman leaves a large egg and a fragment of the meteorite at a Catholic orphanage in Brooklyn, New York City. The egg hatches into a baby girl.

Twenty years later, Italian-American brothers Mario and Luigi working as plumbers in Brooklyn are close to being driven out of business by mafioso Anthony Scapelli's construction company. Luigi meets Daisy, a New York University archaeology student who shows him she has been excavating for dinosaur bones under the Brooklyn Bridge. There, they witness Scapelli's cronies sabotaging it by leaving the water pipes open. Mario and Luigi fix it, but Iggy and Spike—henchmen and cousins of President "King" Koopa, the illegitimate leader of the other dimension—kidnap Daisy after mistakenly kidnapping other girls, including Mario's girlfriend, Daniella. The duo pursues them through an interdimensional portal to Dinohattan, where they lose track of Daisy and her necklace, which is stolen by Big Bertha, the bouncer of a local nightclub.

Daisy learns she is descended from dinosaurs and the long-lost princess of the other dimension. Her father, the king, was devolved by Koopa, then a general in the king's army, into a fungus that has since spread across Dinohattan; her mother, the queen, took her to Brooklyn, only to be crushed to death when the portal was sealed. Iggy and Spike realize that they lost Daisy's necklace, which contains a fragment of the meteorite that will allow it to merge the dimensions. They believe only Daisy can do so because of her royal heritage. Mario and Luigi break out of the city's local prison and go to rescue Daisy, aided by the fungus as well as Toad, a good-natured guitarist who was devolved into a Goomba, a semi-humanoid dinosaur, as punishment for his protests against Koopa. Daisy's escape attempt is aided by Yoshi, a pet of the royal family, and Iggy and Spike, who decide to turn on Koopa following their cousin's use of the (d)evolution gun to enhance their intelligence. While Luigi rescues Daisy, Mario saves Daniella and the other girls who were mistaken for the princess.

Koopa's jealous girlfriend, Lena, tries unsuccessfully to kill Daisy, then obtains the fragment with plans to overthrow him, but is fossilized when she merges the dimensions. In Brooklyn, Koopa attempts his takeover, but Luigi and Daisy remove the fragment from the meteorite, and the dimensions separate. Toad gives Mario and Luigi handheld devolution devices, and they defeat Koopa by devolving him into a Tyrannosaurus rex, then primeval slime. Daisy's father is evolved back to normal and regains his position. The citizens celebrate and immediately destroy anything involving Koopa. Daisy decides to stay in Dinohattan and kisses Luigi goodbye as she opens the portal for him and Mario to return home.

Three weeks later, the Mario brothers are heralded as heroes. Daisy arrives at their apartment in Brooklyn and asks them to help her on a new mission. In a post-credits scene, two Japanese businessmen approach unseen figures for permission to develop a video game based on their experiences; it is revealed they are talking to Iggy and Spike, who christen the game The Super Koopa Cousins.

== Cast ==
The cast of Super Mario Bros. is as follows:

- Bob Hoskins as Mario Mario
- John Leguizamo as Luigi Mario
- Dennis Hopper as President "King" Koopa
- Samantha Mathis as Princess Daisy and the Queen
- Fisher Stevens as Iggy Koopa
- Richard Edson as Spike Koopa
- Dana Kaminski as Daniella Verducci
- Fiona Shaw as Lena
- Mojo Nixon as Toad
  - John Fifer as Goomba Toad
- Francesca P. Roberts as Big Bertha
- Gianni Russo as Anthony Scapelli
- Don Lake as Sergeant Simon
- Lance Henriksen as the King
- Frank Welker as the voice of Yoshi and Goombas
- Dan Castellaneta as the narrator

== Production ==
=== Development ===
Following the release of Super Mario Bros. (1985), a video game developed and published by Nintendo, numerous producers attempted to purchase the rights to make a Super Mario Bros. film. In 1989, Nintendo gave DIC Entertainment the right to make a film out of The Super Mario Bros. Super Show!, but it was never produced. In 1990, Dustin Hoffman attempted to purchase the rights to produce a film with himself as Mario, Danny DeVito as Luigi, and Barry Levinson directing. However, this was not made because of scheduling conflicts for DeVito. Jake Eberts purchased the film rights and started developing an adaptation to be directed by Penny Marshall.

Producer Roland Joffé first came up with the idea of making a live-action adaptation of the video games himself during a script meeting at Eberts' production company Lightmotive. Joffé met Nintendo of America then-president and Hiroshi Yamauchi's son-in law, Minoru Arakawa. He presented Arakawa with an initial draft of the script. One month after their meeting, Joffé traveled to Nintendo's headquarters in Kyoto to pitch the storyline to Yamauchi, which led to Nintendo receiving interest in the project. Joffé left with a $2 million contract giving the temporary control of the Mario character to Joffé. Nintendo retained merchandising rights through a "creative partnership" with Lightmotive.

When Yamauchi asked Joffé why Nintendo should sell the rights to Lightmotive over a major company, Joffé assured them that Nintendo would have more control over the film. However, Nintendo had no interest in creative control and believed the Mario brand was strong enough to allow an experiment with an outside industry. Joffé said, "I think they looked at the movie as some sort of strange creature that was kind of rather intriguing to see if we could walk or not."

=== Writing ===
The first screenplay was written by Oscar-winning screenwriter Barry Morrow. His story followed brothers Mario and Luigi on an existential road trip so similar to Morrow's prior Rain Man (1988) that production titled the script "Drain Man". Morrow described his screenplay as "a study in contrast, like Laurel and Hardy or Abbott and Costello", that would have "an odyssey and a quest" like the game itself. Co-producer Fred Caruso later said that Morrow's story was "more of a serious drama piece as opposed to a fun comedy". One of the earliest scripts involved being closer to the video game and Arnold Schwarzenegger as King Koopa.

The writing team of Jim Jennewein and Tom S. Parker were brought on next to write a more traditional adaptation. Jennewein said, "So right away we knew that the best way to do this is to essentially have a journey into this world, not unlike The Wizard of Oz." His and Parker's take on the story was to subvert and satirize fairy tale clichés, and to focus on the relationship between Mario and Luigi. Jennewein said, "Essentially what we did was what Shrek did [...] And we knew the story had to be about the brothers and that the emotional through-line would be about the brothers." Greg Beeman of License to Drive (1988) was attached to direct and development had already moved into pre-production, but the failure of Beeman's recent Mom and Dad Save the World (1992) led to his dismissal by nervous producers. Joffé then offered Harold Ramis the director position, but though he was a fan of the video game, Ramis declined the opportunity, which he later said he was "glad" about and which the Associated Press would observe was his "smartest career decision".

Joffé said, "We tried some various avenues that didn't work, that came up too medieval or somehow wasn't the right thing. I felt the project was taking a wrong turn [...] And that's when I began thinking of Max Headroom." Joffé traveled to Rome to meet with creators Rocky Morton and Annabel Jankel. Morton said, "We come from the Tim Burton school of filmmaking, because our background is in animation and comic books [...] So we started off basing everything in reality, and then tried to have fun and exaggerate it as much as possible." Joffé, Morton, and Jankel agreed their approach to adapting the video games should follow the darker tone popularized by Batman (1989) and Teenage Mutant Ninja Turtles (1990). Joffé said, "This wasn't Snow White and the Seven Dinosaurs [...] The dino world was dark. We didn't want to hold back." Morton described the film as a prequel to the video games that tells the "true story" behind Nintendo's inspiration. Joffé viewed the games as a "mixture of Japanese fairy tales and bits of modern America", and wanted to create a "slightly mythic vision of New York". Screenwriter Parker Bennett elaborated: "Our take on it was that Nintendo interpreted the events from our story and came up with the video game. We basically worked backwards." The film also took inspiration from Die Hard (1988), Mad Max (1979), and Blade Runner (1982).

The concept of a parallel universe inhabited by dinosaurs was inspired by Dinosaur Land from the recently released Super Mario World (1990). Jankel envisioned the parallel dimension as "a whole world with a reptile point-of-view, dominated by aggressive, primordial behavior and basic instincts", while Morton considered the ecological and technological consequences of a dinosaur society that holds fossil fuels sacred. Joffé noted, "It's a wonderful parody of New York and heavy industry [...] We call it the New Brutalism." Parker Bennett and Terry Runté were tasked with re-writing the script to balance comedy with a darker tone: Bennett said, "Ghostbusters was the model [...] We were aiming towards funny, but kind of weird and dark."

Though working well with the directors, the producers dismissed Bennett and Runté from the project for being too comedic and replaced them with the British writing team of Dick Clement and Ian La Frenais to deliver a more adult and feminist tone. Princess Daisy and Lena's roles were expanded and Bertha was introduced as a black woman. With this script, the main cast signed, and Bob Hoskins was finally convinced to take the role of Mario. The film officially moved into pre-production. However, producers Joffé and Eberts feared the project had both skewed too far from the intended young adult and family audiences, and had become too effects-heavy to film within budget, so without informing directors Morton and Jankel or the signed cast they hired screenwriters Ed Solomon and Ryan Rowe to provide a more family-friendly script with more restrained effects requirements. The script doctoring was partially motivated by a studio purchasing the film's distribution rights.

Directors Morton and Jankel considered leaving the project but decided to stay after discussing together and realizing that no other director could at that point understand the material enough to properly adapt it. Morton and Jankel also said they owed it to the cast and crew and believed they could reclaim their vision during production. Rowe returned home to work on another project, but Solomon remained for several weeks to provide additional rewrites. Without invitation, Bennett and Runté traveled to Wilmington and immediately returned to the project. They would remain through production to provide final rewrites, dialogue for ADR, and the dialogue for the expository animated dinosaur opening. The intelligent fungus was inspired by both the Mushroom Kingdom from the games and tabloid reports of a discovered gigantic fungus. Production designer David Snyder recalled: "As each script developed the fungus was sort of a metaphor for the mushroom element in a Nintendo game." Joffé reflected, "For me a screenplay is never finished [...] You work a screenplay all the time. When you bring actors in a screenplay goes through another evolution. So you can say that rather like the fungus in the movie the screenplay constantly evolves."

=== Casting ===
After securing the film rights, Lightmotive began the casting for the characters. Hoffman continued to express interest in portraying Mario. However, Arakawa did not believe that he was right for the role. DeVito was offered both the role of Mario and director. Arnold Schwarzenegger and Michael Keaton were approached to play Koopa, but both turned down the role. The studio considered Tom Hanks for the role of Luigi, but a string of recent box-office failures dropped him from consideration. Actors Bob Hoskins and John Leguizamo were ultimately cast as Mario and Luigi.

Initially, Hoskins disliked the script and did not want to do another children's film: "I'd done Roger Rabbit. I'd done Hook. I didn't want to become like Dick Van Dyke." Hoskins wondered how he would prepare for the role, saying, "I'm the right shape. I've got a mustache. I worked as a plumber's apprentice for about three weeks and set the plumber's boots on fire with a blowtorch." Producer Roland Joffé kept sending Hoskins new script revisions until finally, the actor agreed. Co-director Jankel said, "Bob was a no brainer [...] Unabashed shameless physical type casting. Bob was brilliant at assuming the character, in a slightly amplified way that would be in keeping with his supposed subsequent game iteration."

Leguizamo said, "What I liked about the script was the adventure and the action that was involved". He joked that "You always see a lot of Italians playing Latin people, like Al Pacino did in Scarface. Now it's our turn!" Jankel said, "John was a brilliant up and coming stand-up comic and actor [...] We went to see him at Second City, and we were 100% sold. He had a wonderful combination of empathy and irreverence but was entirely without guile. It was not specifically scripted to be cast with a Hispanic or Latino actor, but it made perfect sense that the Mario Bros. themselves should be this contemporary unconventional family, so the small unit of just two, couldn't be pegged as one thing or another." Mojo Nixon said he was cast as Toad because the production wanted an actual musician for the character, but their first choice Tom Waits was unavailable. Nixon's agent pitched him to casting as a "third-rate Tom Waits—for half-price".

=== Filming ===
Several weeks before filming began, the Walt Disney Studios acquired the film rights and was to produce it under its film division Hollywood Pictures. After Disney requested rewrites of the script, Morton said the final result was a script that was not at all like the script that he, Jankel, and the cast had signed on to film, and that the tone of the new script was not at all compatible with the sets, which had already been built. Solomon recalled that he "felt like [his draft of the screenplay] was at least coherent," but upon visiting the set, [Morton] had cut it up with a bunch of other stuff he liked from other drafts and a bunch of new stuff. [...] There was no through line." Leguizamo said, "It's eight-year-olds who play the game and that's where the movie needed to be aimed. [...] But [the directors] kept trying to insert new material. They shot scenes with strippers and with other sexually-explicit content, which all got edited out anyway." Richard Edson said that he and co-star Fisher Stevens were permitted to contribute their own dialogue at the writers' approval: "If we could improve the script, they were more than happy. So we did our own [dialogue] and they loved it [...] that made it a lot more fun for us."

Principal photography began on May 6, 1992, and wrapped on July 27, 1992. It was filmed at Carolco Studios in Wilmington, North Carolina. Contrary to many reports, directors Morton and Jankel did complete the contracted shooting, though director of photography Dean Semler and several second unit directors provided additional reshoots. Morton and Jankel would even provide such instructions as the camera aperture settings, to which Semler responded by questioning his employment on the production. Morton said, "I was locked out of the editing room [...] I had to get the DGA to come and help me get back into the editing room. I tried to get the editor to cut it digitally, but they refused. They wanted to edit on Moviola and Steenbeck machines, so the process was laboriously slow, which didn't help us get the special effect cut in on time." Initially, the film's ending had Mario and Luigi returning to Brooklyn, New York, and the scene was filmed, but the producers cut it out; Morton later said that the initial ending would have saved the film.

==== Production design ====
Production Designer David Snyder approached turning the Mushroom Kingdom into the live-action setting of Dinohattan (which was first given the tentative names "DinoYawk" and "Koopaville") by "[taking] all the elements that are in the video game" and "[turning] them into a metaphor and [combining] them with 3-D and real characters". Art Director Walter P. Martishius said, "Koopa gets a single glimpse of Manhattan at the beginning of the movie". This inspires Koopa to recreate Dinohattan, but "he didn't get it quite right. The place is twisted, off balance, different. And he doesn't even know it."

Co-producer Fred Caruso located the deserted Ideal Cement Co. plant in Wilmington, North Carolina. Snyder found the location a unique opportunity: "In this building, with all the existing concrete structure, we could hang the scenery from the structure, and not have to build scaffolding, and could integrate the concrete structure into the design." Snyder said: "In Blade Runner [a film he was the Art Director on], the street was one level. Here I have a street level, a pedestrian walkway and above that Koopa's Room, plus six or seven stories in height. I have more flexibility in layering of levels. It's a major, major opportunity. You'd never be able to do this on a sound stage. There isn't a sound stage big enough." "We've designed this film with the idea of looking at New York while on some mind-altering drugs." The intelligent fungus, later revealed as the rightful King devolved, was created from a fishing lure base and hot glue by prop designer Simon Murton.

==== Creature effects ====
Lead creatures designer and supervisor Patrick Tatopoulos was aware of the concurrent Jurassic Park production, so he consciously designed the dinosaurs for Super Mario Bros. to be more cute and cartoon-like with inspiration from Beetlejuice. Tatopoulos described Yoshi as "an abstract, fantasy T. rex", and designed the baby dinosaur with large eyes to evoke a softer and less menacing quality. Lead SFX sculptor Mark Maitre compared Yoshi to a cross between "a Tyrannosaurus rex and an iguana". Four versions of the Yoshi puppet were built: a stand-in, a wireless model, a half-puppet for the tongue, and a fully functional model. The fully functional puppet utilized 70 cables and nine operators, costing $500,000 (equivalent to $1.12 million in 2024). Producers from Jurassic Park visited the set and were so impressed with the Yoshi puppet they briefly considered hiring its engineers for a second Jurassic Park creatures shop. Originally, the Goombas were only background characters, but their final designs were so impressive that directors Morton and Jankel promoted them to main characters with major stunts.

==== Visual effects ====
Super Mario Bros. introduced several techniques considered innovative in the transition from practical to digital visual effects. It is the first film to have used the compositing software Flame before it was acquired by Autodesk. The film was also the first to be scanned with the Kodak Cineon film scanner to create a digital intermediate, allowing for the compositing of more than 700 visual effects shots. The team consisted of both traditional rotoscope artists and digital artists, comprising approximately 30 people in total.

Visual effects supervisor Chris Woods directed all of the live-action plate shots required for effects work. Woods explained that "it was much too expensive in those days to put a whole film through [the scanner]," so only those shots were scanned by Kodak, which animator and compositor Sheena Duggal stated was the first time the company had ever done so. Technicolor provided visual effects dailies for the team, scanning the shots back onto film with the effects integrated. The disintegration effect for the inter-dimensional merge was inspired by the transporter from Star Trek. The film was shortlisted at the 66th Academy Awards for Best Visual Effects, but it was ultimately not nominated.

== Reception ==
=== Box office ===
In the US and Canada, Super Mario Bros. grossed $8.5 million during its opening weekend, ranking fourth at the box office, below Cliffhanger, Made in America and Dave. It went on to gross $20,915,465, with approximately 5.059 million tickets sold in the United States. It earned ¥300 million ($2.7 million) from distribution rentals in Japan, and sold 106,083 tickets in Seoul. It grossed £2,823,116 ($4,232,558) in the UK, and sold 391,800 tickets in France and 290,098 tickets in Germany. It grossed $17.997 million internationally for a worldwide total of $38,912,465.

=== Critical response ===
On the review aggregator website Rotten Tomatoes, 26% of 46 critics' reviews are positive, with an average rating of 4.1/10. The website's consensus reads: "Despite flashy sets and special effects, Super Mario Bros. is too light on story and substance to be anything more than a novelty." Metacritic, which uses a weighted average, assigned the film a score of 35 out of 100, based on 24 critics, indicating "generally unfavorable" reviews. Audiences surveyed by CinemaScore gave the film an average grade of "B+" on an A+ to F scale.

Michael Wilmington of the Los Angeles Times said "It's a movie split in two: wildly accomplished on one level, wildly deficient on another." He gave it high marks for its effects and the "sheer density and bravura of the production design", but ultimately provided a low final score for poor writing. Janet Maslin of The New York Times also commended the visual effects, and suggested Bob Hoskins could "handle any role with grace and good humor", but concluded "it doesn't have the jaunty hop-and-zap spirit of the Nintendo video game from which it takes—ahem—its inspiration". Mark Caro of the Chicago Tribune said "The movie's no stinker", lauded Hoskins and Leguizamo for their brotherly dynamic, and called the Goombas "wonderfully daffy supporting characters". Hal Hinson of The Washington Post likewise praised the performances and creature effects: "In short, it's a blast."

Gene Siskel of the Chicago Tribune and Roger Ebert of the Chicago Sun-Times gave the film two thumbs down on the television program Siskel & Ebert at the Movies, citing tonal inconsistency and lack of narrative, and named it one of the worst films of 1993. Stephen Hunter of The Baltimore Sun thought Yoshi had "more personality than all the human actors put together".

== Home media ==
The film was first released on LaserDisc in the United States on December 8, 1993. It was released for rental on VHS in the United States in January 1994. It was released on DVD in the United States on June 3, 2003, and again in 2010. The DVD release is presented in non-anamorphic widescreen with an English Dolby Digital 5.1 audio track.

It was released on Blu-ray by Second Sight Films in the United Kingdom on November 3, 2014, and was re-released as a limited edition Blu-ray SteelBook by Zavvi in the UK in February 2017. It was released on Blu-ray in Japan on December 22, 2017, which has the same features and extras as the Second Sight Films release.

An Australian Blu-ray release by Umbrella Entertainment was released in October 2021, with the same bonus features as Second Sight's release, plus the original workprint including deleted scenes. This release is region-free, and can be played on systems from any region. As of 2018, fan website Super Mario Bros.: The Movie Archive was working with original VFX Supervisor Christopher F. Woods on a 4K resolution transfer and restoration. In 2024, Umbrella released the film on 4K Blu-ray to commemorate its 30th anniversary.

== Legacy ==
In a 2007 interview, Hoskins was asked what he considered the worst choice in his acting career. He responded: "Super Mario Bros. It was a fuckin' nightmare. The whole experience was a nightmare. It had a husband-and-wife team directing, whose arrogance had been mistaken for talent. After so many weeks their own agent told them to get off the set! Fuckin' nightmare. Fuckin' idiots." He and Leguizamo got drunk before each day of filming and continued to drink between takes. In a 2011 interview with The Guardian, Hoskins reiterated this response when asked, "What is the worst job you've done?", "What has been your biggest disappointment?", and "If you could edit your past, what would you change?" His answer to all three was Super Mario Bros. His son, Jack Hoskins, is a fan of the Mario series as well as the film and praised his performance.

Though Leguizamo wrote in his autobiography that he hated the film and regretted acting in it, it was widely considered his breakout role in film acting. He prepared a video message for the film's 20th anniversary in 2013, saying "I'm glad people appreciate the movie [...] It was the first, nobody had ever done it before [...] I'm proud of the movie in retrospect."

Hopper disparaged the production, recounting in 2008: "It was a nightmare, very honestly, that movie. It was a husband-and-wife directing team who were both control freaks and wouldn't talk before they made decisions. Anyway, I was supposed to go down there for five weeks, and I was there for 17. It was so over budget." He added, "My six-year-old son at the time—he's now 18—he said, 'Dad I think you're probably a pretty good actor, but why did you play that terrible guy King Koopa in Super Mario Bros.?' And I said, 'Well Henry, I did that so you could have shoes,' and he said, 'Dad, I don't need shoes that badly.'"

Morton reflected on the film in 2014 as a "harrowing" experience. Morton felt "very uneasy" being put in the position of having to defend the new script. In addition, working with Hopper was "really, really hard. Really hard. I don't think [Hopper] had a clue what was going on." He described the experience as humiliating, but was proud of the film's originality. For the film's 20th anniversary, Morton said: "I wanted parents to really get into it. At that time, there was a very hardcore movement against video games, and a lot of anti-video games sentiment. I wanted to make a film that would open it up and get parents interested in video games."

Despite not being "one of [my] proudest moment as an actor", Mathis said of the film: "[I]t's maybe [the one] that I get asked the most about [...] There are a lot of people who are really excited to meet me because I was [Princess] Daisy. That's all you can ask for as an actor—that your work, and something you were part of, left an impression on people and makes them feel good."

Co-director Jankel said, "I do feel in my heart, it was a hell of an achievement to have made it, under those circumstances, and it has in time, happily, achieved cult status [...] I am often hearing how many people loved it growing up, watch it repeatedly, and are genuine fans."

Producer Joffé remains proud: "It's not that I defend the movie, it's just that, in its own extraordinary way, it was an interesting and rich artefact and has earned its place. It has strange cult status." He never heard what Yamauchi or Nintendo thought of the finished product. He said, "They never phoned up to complain [...] They were very polite." The Nintendo of America president Reggie Fils-Aimé said in 2017 that the film "left a really bad taste in the mouth of our developers" and that he had heard "horror stories" about its production from Nintendo employees.

In 2018, Phil Harnage, writer of The Super Mario Bros. Super Show!, revealed that the box office failure was considered a relief to the crew of the animated series, saying, "[We] were all very happy because everybody hated it! It was such a waste of time and talent." He added that they were never contacted about the film.

Mario creator Shigeru Miyamoto said: "[In] the end, it was a very fun project that they put a lot of effort into [...] The one thing that I still have some regrets about is that the movie may have tried to get a little too close to what the Mario Bros. video games were. And in that sense, it became a movie that was about a video game, rather than being an entertaining movie in and of itself." Aaron Horvath, co-director of 2023's The Super Mario Bros. Movie, felt the film differentiated from what he had hoped for in an adaptation of the games growing up, although he conceded to retrospectively enjoying it. Seth Rogen, who voiced Donkey Kong in the 2023 film, called Super Mario Bros. one of the worst films ever made and what "made me realize that movies, like, could be bad. That never occurred to me until that moment."

=== Cultural impact ===
Ryan Hoss, a longtime fan of the film, launched the fansite Super Mario Bros: The Movie Archive. He told Playboy for the film's 25th anniversary, "I had this collection, and the Internet was growing in terms of fansites during that era, the late '90s, and I always knew the Mario Bros. movie was misunderstood and a sore spot in people's minds—at least, the way it was being portrayed on the Internet, the 'worst movie ever' kind of deal." He characterized the site: "It's a way to celebrate the film itself and showcase the work of all the people who had a part in it—warts and all, good and bad."

In 2010 Steven Applebaum joined the site as editor-in-chief to help collect production materials and organize interviews. He said, "Most of the [cast and crew] were very happy about it because, at the time, it was a very revolutionary movie [...] They were introducing a lot of great special effects that hadn't been done before, and they had these really talented actors, and it was a project they were proud to work on. [...] Giving them a chance to talk about everything they did, it really helped them to share what they contributed and what they felt was important to the industry." The film returned to theaters through fan efforts in 2012, and in 2013 for the 20th anniversary. The Nintendo Power 20th anniversary retrospective issue states that the fact that the film was made—regardless of quality—shows how much the game series had impacted popular culture.

=== Themes ===
Thomas Leitch has written that Super Mario Bros. is an example of post-literary adaptation and that it "drops facetious references" to The Wizard of Oz, Star Wars, and Doctor Zhivago. Stephen Hunter of The Baltimore Sun compared the Goombas to the winged monkeys of The Wizard of Oz, suggesting they similarly evoke a "mix of pity and terror". The phrase "Trust the Fungus" has been compared to "May the Force be with you" from Star Wars.

=== Extended cut ===
On June 1, 2021, editor and film preservationist Garrett Gilchrist and members of The Super Mario Bros. (Movie) Archive released a "semi-official" restoration of the extended cut of Super Mario Bros. The restorationists named it The Morton-Jankel Cut because it was based on an earlier VHS workprint which had been discovered. Gilchrist was hired to get the most out of the low-quality VHS. The film is extended by twenty minutes in this cut, with additional scenes including Koopa devolving a technician into slime for the crime of sneezing, Mario's rivalry with the mafia-affiliated Scapelli plumbing company, and an anti-Koopa rap by Spike and Iggy at the Boom Boom Bar, backed up with scantily clad lizard dancers. Though the Morton-Jankel Cut was theoretically intended as an official Blu-ray extra, there are no plans for this to happen, and it was leaked to Internet Archive instead. The Australian Blu-ray by Umbrella (released October 2021) used a raw edit of the VHS workprint rather than Gilchrist's restoration.

The "Trust the Fungus – Super Mario Bros. 30th Anniversary Collector's Edition" was released on Blu-ray by Umbrella Entertainment in 2023. This featured deleted scenes and the "Lasagna Workprint" from the same VHS source used previously for the Morton-Jankel Cut, but restored differently for this edition.

== Soundtrack ==
Super Mario Bros.

Soundtrack album by Various Artists
- Released: May 10, 1993
- Genres: Pop; rock; heavy metal; funk; Hip-hop; soul; jazz rap
- Length: 55:16
- Label: Capitol Records
- Producer: Various Artists

Singles from Super Mario Bros.
- 1. "Almost Unreal" Released: May 10, 1993; 2. "Love Is the Drug" Released: November 29, 1993

Professional ratings
Review scores
Source	Rating
AllMusic	2.5/5 stars
Entertainment Weekly	D
Music Week	2/5 stars
Philadelphia Inquirer	1.5/4 stars

The soundtrack, released on May 10, 1993, by Capitol Records, features two songs from Roxette: "Almost Unreal", which was released as a single, and "2 Cinnamon Street", which is an alternate version of the song "Cinnamon Street" from Roxette's album Tourism. The music video for "Almost Unreal" was inspired by the film, featuring scenes from the film and a de-evolution theme. "Almost Unreal" was originally written for the film Hocus Pocus, but was switched out to an En Vogue song instead. Roxette subsequently gave the song to the Mario film. Roxette co-founder Per Gessle said "the film turned out to be ridiculous (so thought Dennis Hopper by the way ... I met him at a Formula 1 race many years ago discussing this...) but the song isn't that bad".

Track listing
No.	Title	Writer(s)	Performed by	Length
1.	"Almost Unreal"	Per Gessle	Roxette	3:59
2.	"Love Is the Drug" (Originally performed by Roxy Music)	Bryan Ferry, Andy Mackay	Divinyls	4:35
3.	"Walk the Dinosaur" (Originally performed by Was (Not Was))	Randy Jacobs, David Was, Don Was	George Clinton & The Goombas	4:06
4.	"I Would Stop the World"	Mick Leeson, Peter Vale	Charles & Eddie	4:24
5.	"I Want You"	Donnie Wahlberg	Marky Mark and the Funky Bunch	6:11
6.	"Where Are You Going?"		Extreme	4:34
7.	"Speed of Light"	Joe Satriani	Joe Satriani	5:10
8.	"Breakpoint"	Dave Mustaine, David Ellefson, Nick Menza	Megadeth	3:29
9.	"Tie Your Mother Down"	Brian May	Queen	3:46
10.	"Cantaloop (Flip Fantasia)"	Herbie Hancock, Rahsaan Kelly, Mel Simpson, Geoff Wilkinson	Us3 Featuring Rahsaan & Gerrard Prescencer	4:29
11.	"Don't Slip Away [ * ]"	Tracie Spencer, Narada Michael Walden, Sylvester Jackson	Tracie Spencer	5:19
12.	"2 Cinnamon Street [ * ]"	Per Gessle	Roxette	5:06
Total length:				55:16

* These tracks were not included in the U.S. and Canada releases, only on the international versions of the album.

== 2023 animated film ==
Rumors of a more source-accurate theatrical animated Mario film began in late 2014, with leaked emails between film producer Avi Arad and Sony Pictures head Tom Rothman suggesting that Sony would be producing it. On November 14, 2017, Universal Pictures and Illumination announced a computer-animated Mario film. On January 31, 2018, Nintendo of America announced its partnership with Illumination, stating that the film would be co-produced by Shigeru Miyamoto and Chris Meledandri. On November 6, 2018, Meledandri stated that the film would be a "priority" for the studio, with a tentative 2022 release date, while reaffirming that Miyamoto would be involved "front and center" in the film's creation. Speaking of the challenge of adapting the series into an animated film, Meledandri stated the film would be "an ambitious task...taking things that are so thin in their original form and finding depth that doesn't compromise what generations of fans love about Mario, but also feels organic to the iconography and can support a three-act structure".

The Super Mario Bros. Movie was released in the United States on April 5, 2023. It received mixed reviews from critics, and was a major commercial success, grossing $1.363 billion worldwide and setting multiple box-office records including the biggest worldwide opening weekend for an animated film and the highest-grossing film based on a video game. It became the second-highest-grossing film of 2023, the third-highest-grossing (now sixth-highest-grossing) animated film of all time, and the highest-grossing film produced by Illumination. A sequel, The Super Mario Galaxy Movie, was released on April 1, 2026.

== See also ==
- List of films based on video games
- List of films considered the worst
- Super Mario Bros.: The Great Mission to Rescue Princess Peach! – 1986 Japanese anime film
