= Fireworks (Roxette song) =

1994 single by Roxette

Single by Roxette

from the album Crash! Boom! Bang!
- Released: 5 September 1994
- Length: 3:40
- Label: EMI
- Songwriter: Per Gessle
- Producer: Clarence Öfwerman

Roxette singles chronology
"Crash! Boom! Bang!" (1994)	"Fireworks" (1994)	"Run to You" (1994)

Music video
- "Fireworks" on YouTube

"Fireworks" is a song by Swedish pop music duo Roxette, released on 5 September 1994 by EMI Records as the third single from the duo's fifth studio album, Crash! Boom! Bang! (1994). Written by Per Gessle and produced by Clarence Öfwerman, the song achieved moderate success in various European countries. It peaked within the top 20 in Austria, Finland and Israel, and reached number 30 on the UK Singles Chart. The accompanying music video was directed by Michael Geoghegan.

== Release ==
The song was the only internationally released single by Roxette to be omitted from their career retrospective The Rox Box, which included every other single released by the duo up to 2006, and it has never appeared on any of the duo's compilation albums—excluding the Jesus Jones remix of the song included on Rarities (1996). In an interview with The Daily Roxette in 2009, Per Gessle was asked why the song was ignored on compilations, saying: "I guess it just wasn't big enough. There are so many other [Roxette] tracks that kick its ass. And on The Rox Box, we decided to use demos and other uplifting stuff instead."

== Music video ==
Irish filmmaker Michael Geoghegan, who also directed videos for their preceding three singles "Almost Unreal", "Sleeping in My Car" and "Crash! Boom! Bang!", directed the music video, which centers around twin sisters who emigrate from the Swedish countryside to London to pursue fame and fortune. In London, the sisters are seen at various locations, including Piccadilly Circus and the London Underground. During the song's bridge, the sisters are sexually assaulted underneath a bridge. They return to Sweden, and, at the end of the video, their younger brother is revealed to be Per Gessle.

== Formats and track listings ==
All songs were written by Per Gessle.

- 7-inch single and cassette (Australia 8651124 · UK TCEM324)
1. "Fireworks" (Single Edit) – 3:40
2. "Dangerous" (Unplugged Version) – 3:13
- CD single (Australia · Europe 8651132)
1. "Fireworks" – 3:40
2. "Fireworks" (Jesus Jones Remix) – 4:11
3. "Dangerous" (Unplugged Version) – 3:13
4. "The Rain" (Demo, 29 December 1991) – 4:44
- UK CD1 (CDEMS345)
1. "Fireworks" – 3:40
2. "Dangerous" (Unplugged Version) – 3:13
3. "The Rain" (Demo) – 4:44
4. "Crash! Boom! Bang!" (Radio Edit) – 4:25
- UK CD2 (CDEM345)
1. "Fireworks" – 3:40
2. "I'm Sorry" (Demo, 18 August 1993) – 3:20
3. "Fireworks" (Jesus Jones Remix) – 4:11
4. "Sleeping in My Car" – 3:47

== Charts ==
Chart (1994)	Peak position
Australia (ARIA)	68
Austria (Ö3 Austria Top 40)	18
Belgium (Ultratop 50 Flanders)	24
Canada Top Singles (RPM)	60
Europe (Eurochart Hot 100)	33
Europe (European AC Radio)	5
Europe (European Hit Radio)	8
Finland (Suomen virallinen lista)	14
Germany (GfK)	51
Iceland (Íslenski Listinn Topp 40)	32
Israel (Israeli Singles Chart)	13
Netherlands (Dutch Top 40 Tipparade)	7
Netherlands (Single Top 100)	41
Scottish Singles Sales (Official Charts)	26
Spain Airplay (AFYVE)	2
Sweden (Sverigetopplistan)	34
UK Singles (Official Charts)	30
UK Airplay (Music Week)	14
