= Workers' Gymnasium =

Indoor arena located at Workers' Stadium in Beijing, China

- Workers Indoor Arena
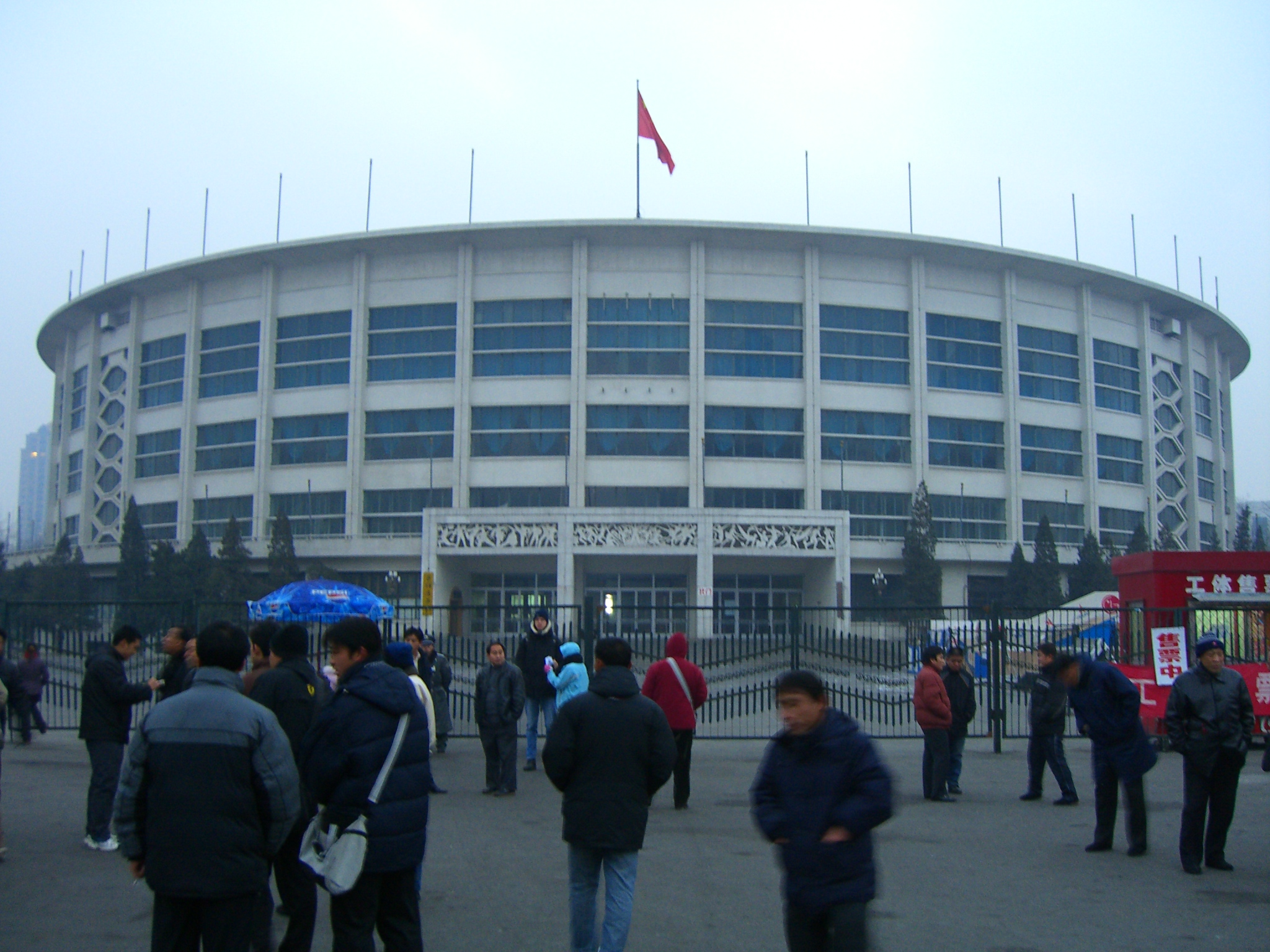

- Location within Beijing
- Location: Gongti Road, Beijing, China
- Coordinates: 39.9308°N 116.4359°E
- Capacity: 13,000 (lower for Olympics)

Construction
- Opened: 1961
- Renovated: Completed by 2008

Tenants
- 1961 World Table Tennis Championships; Boxing at the 2008 Summer Olympics; Judo at the 2008 Summer Paralympics

Workers' Gymnasium
- Traditional Chinese: 北京工人體育館
- Simplified Chinese: 北京工人体育馆
- Literal meaning: Beijing Workers’ Gymnasium
Transcriptions
Standard Mandarin
- Hanyu Pinyin: Běijīng gōngrén tǐyùguǎn

The Workers' Gymnasium (official name) is an indoor arena located west of the Workers' Stadium in Beijing, China. It was inaugurated in 1961 for the 26th World Table Tennis Championships.

It hosted the boxing events at the 2008 Summer Olympics and the Judo events at the 2008 Summer Paralympics. It is one of 11 Beijing-based venues to be renovated and upgraded for the Olympics. The arena has a seating capacity of 13,000.

== Notable events ==
- 21 and 22 October 1981: Jean-Michel Jarre, first Western musician to perform in China.
- 10 April 1985: Wham!, the first Western band to perform in China.
- 19 February 1995: Roxette – Crash! Boom! Bang! Tour
- 4 December 1998: Ricky Martin – Vuelve World Tour
- 1 February 2000: 2000 H.O.T. Live Concert in Beijing
- 31 March 2004: Deep Purple
- 7 March 2005: Norah Jones – Norah Jones & The Handsome Band Tour
- 1 November 2008: Kanye West – Glow in the Dark Tour
- 1 December 2008: Kylie Minogue – KylieX2008
- 6 April 2011: Bob Dylan – Never Ending Tour 2011
- 4 November 2013: OneRepublic – Native Tour
- 9 November 2013: T-ara 2013 Showcase Live in Beijing
- 10 July 2014: Jessie J
- 10 January 2015: Winner WWIC 2015
- 11 July 2015: T-ara Great China Tour
- 30 October 2015: Vitas – 15 Years With You – China Tour 2015
- 16 April 2016: Road FC 30
- 14 August 2016: Scorpions (band) – Get Your Sting and Blackout World Tour
- 2 September 2017: Black Panther (band) – Hei Bao 30 Years Anniversary Concert

== See also ==
- List of indoor arenas in China
- List of indoor arenas by capacity
