= Sleeping in My Car =

1994 single by Roxette

Single by Roxette

from the album Crash! Boom! Bang!
- Released: 7 March 1994
- Studio: EMI (Stockholm, Sweden)
- Genre: Pop rock
- Length: 3:48
- Label: EMI
- Songwriter: Per Gessle
- Producer: Clarence Öfwerman

Roxette singles chronology
"Almost Unreal" (1993)	"Sleeping in My Car" (1994)	"Crash! Boom! Bang!" (1994)

Music video
- "Sleeping in My Car" on YouTube

"Sleeping in My Car" is a song by Swedish pop music duo Roxette, released on 7 March 1994 by EMI Records as the lead single from the duo's fifth studio album, Crash! Boom! Bang! (1994). The song was composed by Per Gessle in under an hour, and was the final song the band recorded for the album. It is produced by Clarence Öfwerman and is a pop rock song containing elements drawn from pop punk. Marie Fredriksson's vocal range on the track spans over three octaves. The band performed the song at the inaugural 1994 MTV Europe Music Awards.

The song was an immediate commercial success in numerous territories, including Europe, Canada, Israel, Australia, and New Zealand. It became the duo's second number one single in their home country and peaked within the top 20 in 15 other territories. It also peaked at number seven on Billboard's European Hot 100 Singles. In Canada, the song reached the top three on two different national charts. In contrast, it was the duo's final song to enter the US Billboard Hot 100, peaking at number 50. Michael Geoghegan directed its accompanying music video, featuring the duo performing in a parking garage at night.

== Composition and style ==
"Sleeping in My Car" was the final song the band recorded for Crash! Boom! Bang!, and was written by Per Gessle. In the liner notes of their 1995 greatest hits compilation Don't Bore Us, Get to the Chorus!, Gessle described how, on listening to the first playback of the album just before Christmas 1993, the duo realised that it was "missing something. It all sounded so... perfectly grown up." He elaborated: "We had worked for a year, much too long, endless hours of studio time... I mean, I loved it but there was too little P-O-P. Went straight home, really pissed off and came up with this neanderthal-riff and wrote it in an hour."

According to Ultimate Guitar, the track is an uptempo pop rock song, with a moderately fast tempo of 135 beats per minute. The song contains elements of pop punk, and its verse is composed of an F♯m–E–F♯m–D–F♯m–E–C♯–D sequence, while the chorus consists of a sequence of F♯–C♯–D♯m–B–F♯–C♯–B–C♯. The first two lines of the bridge are made up almost entirely of slash chords, consisting of two repetitions of a F♯–C♯/E♯–B/D♯–F♯/C♯ sequence. Marie Fredriksson's vocal range in the song spans over three octaves, from a bass note of F♯3 in the first verse to a C♯5 in the final chorus.

When Roxette performed in the Workers Indoor Arena in Beijing, China in 1995 during the "Crash! Boom! Bang! Tour", Chinese government officials demanded that the band alter the lyrics of this song. "We agreed, but didn't change them in the end," said Gessle.

== Critical reception ==
AllMusic editor Bryan Buss wrote that with "their loose, jangly guitars", "Sleeping in My Car" is a "skillful pop/rock song", and noted further that it "might have been too pop for rock listeners and too rock for mid-'90s pop fans." Upon the release, Larry Flick from Billboard magazine felt the popular act from Sweden ends a lengthy break from recording with "a breezy pop/rocker that is easily its best single since 'It Must Have Been Love'." He added, "Crisp production is heavy on tightly woven electric/acoustic guitar swapping and thunderous drumming, while singer Marie Fredriksson proves her evolution into a pouty rock belter. First single from the forthcoming Crash! Boom! Bang! is a sunny li'l toe-tapper that has already done well all over the world. A similar fate in the U.S. is likely." Troy J. Augusto from Cash Box commented, "Well now, Roxette, no stranger to No. 1 records, has returned, hoping to recapture its past glories with this light and airy pop gem, already a hit across Europe." He stated that the song "stays true to the duo's hit-filled past, mixing lightweight guitar lines, the sharpest pop production and Marie Fredriksson's soaring vocals into a sure-fire hit single."

Swedish Expressen said that Fredriksson "has not sung so cocky" since their 1988 hit "Dressed for Success". Dave Sholin from the Gavin Report remarked that the duo "unleash some hot pop/rock" on the song. Another Swedish newspaper Göteborgsposten complimented it as a "typical Roxette song in good old pop tradition", with a chorus "that stick quickly". Chuck Campbell from Knoxville News Sentinel named it "an obvious choice" as a single, "which rides a traditional rollicking Roxette sound and packs a powerful hook." In his weekly UK chart commentary, James Masterton opined that it "may not be as instantly classic as past hits but is certain to hang around for a couple of weeks." People Magazine called it a "drive-time throwaway", that "sport write-them-in-your-sleep hooks". Pete Stanton from Smash Hits gave the song two out of five, noting its explicit lyrics, and "screaming guitars and even screamier vocals". Another Smash Hits editor, Mark Sutherland, wrote, "And, despite the dodgiest lyrics in pop, they're rather good at it, especially on the storming single 'Sleeping in My Car'."

== Commercial performance ==
The song was an immediate commercial success throughout Europe, and became their second number one single in their native Sweden, where it debuted at number one. It spent a total of three weeks on top of the Swedish Singles Chart. The song peaked at number two in Denmark and Finland—held off the top spot in both countries by Dr. Alban's "Look Who's Talking!". The song peaked in the top 10 of numerous other national record charts, including Austria (6), Belgium (4), Iceland (9), Norway (3) and Switzerland (7). It also peaked at number seven on Billboard's European Hot 100 Singles. The song was also a hit in Germany, where it peaked at number 11 for two non-consecutive weeks, and spent a total of four months on the German Singles Chart.

"Sleeping in My Car" became the duo's final chart success in Australia and New Zealand, peaking within the top 20 in both territories. The duo would have only one further single reach the top 50 in each country: "Run to You" (number 49 in Australia) and "Crash! Boom! Bang!" (number 50 in New Zealand). It was also the final Roxette song to appear on the US Billboard Hot 100, where it peaked at number 50. Conversely, the song was a major commercial success in Canada, peaking at number two on the RPM Top Singles chart. Likewise, the song peaked at number three on The Record's concurrent singles chart—which incorporated airplay into its methodology.

== Music video ==
The music video for "Sleeping in My Car" was filmed in a parking garage at night. It was directed by Irish filmmaker Michael Geoghegan. The video received heavy rotation on MTV Europe and was A-listed on Germany's VIVA in April 1994. Geoghegan would also be directing the video for the duo's next single, "Crash! Boom! Bang!".

== Formats and track listings ==
All songs were written by Per Gessle.

- 7-inch single and cassette (Australia 8650694 · Europe 8650697 · UK EM314 · US 4KM-58143)
1. "Sleeping in My Car" – 3:33
2. "The Look" (Unplugged Version) – 5:11
- Australian and European CD single (8650712)
1. "Sleeping in My Car" – 3:33
2. "The Look" (Unplugged Version) – 5:11
3. "Sleeping in My Car" (The Stockholm Demo Version) – 3:13
- UK and US CD single (UK CDEM314 · US E2-58143)
1. "Sleeping in My Car" – 3:33
2. "The Look" (Unplugged Version) – 5:11
3. "Sleeping in My Car" (The Stockholm Demo Version) – 3:13
4. "Almost Unreal" – 3:59

== Personnel ==
Personnel are adapted from the liner notes of Don't Bore Us, Get to the Chorus!.

- Marie Fredriksson – lead and background vocals
- Per Gessle – electric guitar and mixing
- Anders Herrlin – bass guitar and engineering
- Clarence Öfwerman – keyboards, production and mixing
- Staffan Öfwerman – backing vocals
- Mats "Myrdal" Persson – drums
- Per "Pelle" Sirén – electric guitar
- Alar Suurna – tambourine, engineering and mixing

== Charts ==
=== Weekly charts ===
1994 weekly chart performance for "Sleeping in My Car"
Chart (1994)	Peak position
Australia (ARIA)	18
Austria (Ö3 Austria Top 40)	6
Belgium (Ultratop 50 Flanders)	4
Canada Top Singles (RPM)	2
Canada Retail Singles (The Record)	3
Denmark (Tracklisten)	2
Eurochart Hot 100 (Billboard)	7
Europe (European AC Radio)	4
Europe (European Hit Radio)	2
Finland (Suomen virallinen lista)	2
Germany (GfK)	11
Iceland (Íslenski Listinn Topp 40)	9
Ireland (IRMA)	16
Israel (Israeli Singles Chart)	1
Netherlands (Dutch Top 40)	15
Netherlands (Single Top 100)	19
New Zealand (Recorded Music NZ)	20
Norway (VG-lista)	3
Scottish Singles Sales (Official Charts)	13
Spain (AFYVE)	12
Spain Airplay (AFYVE)	1
Sweden (Sverigetopplistan)	1
Switzerland (Schweizer Hitparade)	7
UK Singles (Official Charts)	14
UK Airplay (Music Week)	5
US Billboard Hot 100	50
US Pop Airplay (Billboard)	22
US Cash Box Top 100	30
US Top 40 (Gavin Report)	17
US CHR/Top 40 (Radio & Records)	27

2025 weekly chart performance for "Sleeping in My Car"
Chart (2025)	Peak position
Poland (Polish Airplay Top 100)	54

=== Year-end charts ===
Year-end chart performance for "Sleeping in My Car"
Chart (1994)	Position
Belgium (Ultratop)	54
Canada Top Singles (RPM)	26
Europe (Eurochart Hot 100)	45
Europe (European Hit Radio)	16
Germany (Media Control)	75
Israel (Israeli Singles Chart)	26
Netherlands (Dutch Top 40)	133
Sweden (Topplistan)	15
UK Singles (OCC)	158

== Certifications ==
Certifications and sales for "Sleeping in My Car"
Region	Certification	Certified units/sales
Sweden (GLF)	Gold	25,000^{^}
^{^} Shipments figures based on certification alone.

== Release history ==
Release dates and formats for "Sleeping in My Car"
Region	Date	Format(s)	Label(s)	Ref.
Europe	7 March 1994	CD	EMI	
United Kingdom	14 March 1994	7-inch vinyl; CD; cassette	EMI	
Japan	8 April 1994	Mini-CD	EMI	
Australia	11 April 1994	CD; cassette	EMI	
United States	2 June 1994	Radio	EMI	
