= Run to You (Roxette song) =

1994 single by Roxette

Single by Roxette

from the album Crash! Boom! Bang!
- B-side: "Don't Believe in Accidents" (demo)
- Released: 21 November 1994
- Genre: Europop; soft rock
- Length: 3:39
- Label: EMI
- Songwriter: Per Gessle
- Producer: Clarence Öfwerman

Roxette singles chronology
"Fireworks" (1994)	"Run to You" (1994)	"Vulnerable" (1995)

Music video
- "Run to You" on YouTube

"Run to You" is a song by Swedish pop music duo Roxette, released on 21 November 1994 by EMI Records as the fourth single from the duo's fifth studio album, Crash! Boom! Bang! (1994). Written by Per Gessle and produced by Clarence Öfwerman, the song charted moderately in several territories, peaking at number 20 in Finland, while reaching the top forty in Belgium, Scotland, Switzerland and the UK. "Run to You" was the duo's final single to chart in the top fifty of the Australian Singles Chart, peaking at number 49. The song's accompanying music video was directed by Jonas Åkerlund, consisting of behind-the-stage footage.

== Composition and style ==
According to Ultimate Guitar, "Run to You" has a medium tempo of 99 beats per minute. The verse is composed of two repetitions of Bm–A–G–A–Bm–A–G–D–Bm, with the pre-chorus consisting of two short bars of E–D–C. The first two choruses are made up of two sequences of G–C–E–D–G–C–G–D. The middle 8 consists of an E–Bm–G–Bm–D sequence, followed by an orchestral instrumental refrain of A–D–E–A–D–A–E–Bm–A–E–D. The final chorus and outro are made up of a repeating A–D–E–A–D–A–E pattern.

Writer Per Gessle said he is "especially fond of the middle-8. It's not as important in today's pop music as it used to be, but for me the greatest songs always had a fantastic middle-8, taking you somewhere else before building up to the chorus again. It's almost like a song within a song." The single contains one B-side: a demo titled "Don't Believe in Accidents", which was written by Gessle on 29 March 1988 as a way to "learn how to use my new synthesizer. I wrote another one as well, probably the same day... that was "The Look". A decent Tuesday."

== Critical reception ==
In his weekly UK chart commentary, James Masterton wrote, "The current single sees the Swedish duo in jangly acoustic mode, producing a not totally unpleasant single but one with work to do if it is going to be a major hit for them." A reviewer from People Magazine complimented Fredriksson's vocals as "more subtle and graceful than her partner’s grating, affected rasp." Pete Stanton from Smash Hits gave it a score of four out of five, stating that "Per and Marie have done it again", adding that Roxette are "big Euro-pop-marshmallow-soft-rocking stars". He noted the song's "pleasant guitars frolic with twirling violins and wow, we're in Happy Land."

== Music video ==
The music video for "Run to You" was directed by Swedish director Jonas Åkerlund, and consists of behind-the-stage footage of the band during the "Crash! Boom! Bang! Tour". It features shots of the band travelling and performing during sound-checks, and ends with a scene of the band taking to the stage at the tour's 18 October 1994 date at the Festhalle in Frankfurt, Germany.

== Track listings ==
All songs were written by Per Gessle, except "Listen to Your Heart" by Gessle and Mats Persson.

- UK 7-inch and cassette single (EM360)
1. "Run to You" – 3:39
2. "Love Is All (Shine Your Light on Me)" (Edit) – 4:33
- CD single (Australia · Europe 8651292 · UK CDEMS360)
1. "Run to You" – 3:39
2. "Don't Believe in Accidents" (Demo, 30 March 1988) – 3:42
3. "Crash! Boom! Bang!" (Demo, 6 May 1993) – 4:15
4. "Almost Unreal" (Demo, February 1993) – 3:25
- UK CD2 (CDEM360)
1. "Run to You" – 3:39
2. "Listen to Your Heart" (7-inch edit) – 4:05
3. "Joyride" (7-inch version) – 3:59
4. "How Do You Do!" – 3:12

== Credits and personnel ==
Credits adapted from the liner notes of The Pop Hits.

Studios

- Recorded at Capri Digital Studios (Capri, Italy) and EMI Studios (Stockholm, Sweden)
- Mixed at EMI Studios (Stockholm, Sweden)

Personnel

- Marie Fredriksson – lead and background vocals
- Per Gessle – lead and background vocals, guitars, mixing
- Anders Herrlin – bass guitar, engineering, programming
- Mats Holmquist – string arrangement, conducting
- Jonas Isacsson – guitars
- Clarence Öfwerman – keyboards, string arrangement, production, mixing
- Stockholms Nya Kammarorkester (credited as SNYKO) – orchestration
- Alar Suurna – mixing, engineering

== Charts ==
Chart (1994–1995)	Peak position
Australia (ARIA)	49
Belgium (Ultratop 50 Flanders)	33
Europe (Eurochart Hot 100)	79
Europe (European AC Radio)	3
Europe (European Hit Radio)	9
Finland (IFPI)	20
Germany (GfK)	51
Iceland (Íslenski Listinn Topp 40)	24
Scottish Singles Sales (Official Charts)	27
Spain Airplay (AFYVE)	21
Switzerland (Schweizer Hitparade)	31
UK Singles (Official Charts)	27
UK Airplay (Music Week)	6
