= Vicki Benckert =

Swedish singer (born 1960)

- Also known as: Victoria B.
- Born: 17 October 1960 (age 65); Lidingö, Sweden
- Genres: Schlager
- Occupations: Singer, composer, musical singer, actress, translator
- Years active: 1984–

Vicki Benckert (born 17 October 1960) is a Swedish pop singer.

Vicki Benckert broke through in the Swedish Melodifestivalen 1984, where she had written three of the songs "Kärleksmagi", "Sankta Cecilia", and "Livet är som ett träd", which she performed herself. Of the 90 songs selected to participate in Melodifestivalen 1984, she wrote or performed in seven.

She also performed in the Schlagerfestival in Sopot, Poland, where she won three of four prizes for singing. She then performed in Moscow to an audience of 80,000. She was also one of many famous backing vocalists for Tommy Nilsson, for his song, "En dag", which represented Sweden in the Eurovision Song Contest 1989.

She has also sung in the choir for Army of Lovers, Tomas Ledin, Niklas Strömstedt, Christer Sandelin, Tommy Körberg and Carola Häggkvist. She has toured the world with Roxette. Vicki still performs in the Stockholm Pride event, on keyboard, guitar and as a vocalist.

She's often known as the original voice for both Harley Quinn and Poison Ivy in the Swedish dub of Batman: The Animated Series.
