= Almost Unreal =

1993 single by Roxette

Single by Roxette

from the album Super Mario Bros.
- B-side: "Fingertips '93"
- Released: 10 May 1993
- Recorded: March 1993
- Studio: Mayfair (London, England); Polar (Stockholm, Sweden)
- Genre: Pop rock
- Length: 3:59
- Label: Capitol; EMI
- Songwriter: Per Gessle
- Producer: Clarence Öfwerman

Roxette singles chronology
"Fingertips '93" (1993)	"Almost Unreal" (1993)	"Sleeping in My Car" (1994)

Music video
- "Almost Unreal" on YouTube

"Almost Unreal" is a song by Swedish pop music duo Roxette, released on 10 May 1993 by EMI Records as the lead single from the soundtrack of the 1993 live action film Super Mario Bros., which starred Bob Hoskins, John Leguizamo, Dennis Hopper, and Samantha Mathis. The song became a top-20 hit in numerous territories, including Scandinavia, Ireland and the UK. It would also be the duo's final top ten hit in the latter two countries, excluding a re-release of "It Must Have Been Love" two months later.

The song proved to be unsuccessful in the United States, failing to enter the top 75 on both the Billboard Hot 100 and Cash Box Top 100, but it peaked within the top 30 in Canada. It appeared as a bonus track on the Japanese edition of their next studio album, Crash! Boom! Bang! (1994), mistitled "It's Almost Unreal". The accompanying music video for "Almost Unreal" was directed by Michael Geoghegan.

== Background and recording ==
Per Gessle wrote "Almost Unreal" after Walt Disney Pictures contacted him about composing the theme song to Bette Midler's upcoming film Hocus Pocus. The song's backing track had already been completed at London's Mayfair Studios in March 1993 when Disney informed Gessle that US girlband En Vogue had been invited to record the film's theme song. "Almost Unreal" was then transferred to another Disney project, the live action adaptation of the Nintendo game series Super Mario Bros., which was released under the Hollywood Pictures banner. Although hesitant about the project, the duo decided to allow the company to use the song in the film, as they were both fans of Bob Hoskins and Dennis Hopper. The group re-recorded the lyrics to omit most references to Hocus Pocus, although the title would still remain in the song's chorus, with the lyric "I love when you do that hocus pocus to me". Marie Fredriksson's vocals were recorded at Polar Studios in Stockholm in March 1993, when she was nine months pregnant.

== Composition and style ==
According to Ultimate Guitar, "Almost Unreal" is a mid-tempo pop rock song composed in the key of E major, and is written in common time with a moderate tempo of 92 beats per minute. The intro is composed of two repetitions of an E–B–Asus_{2} sequence, followed by a further two lines composed of C♯m–B–Asus_{2}. Each verse is composed of variations of a B–G♯m_{7}–E–C♯m–E–A–G♯sus_{4}–G♯ sequence, while the chorus is composed of two repetitions of E–B–A, followed by a C♯m–B–A–F♯ sequence.

== Critical reception ==
Larry Flick from Billboard magazine complimented the song as a "familiar power pop ballad" and said that "ABBA-esque harmonies at the chorus give the track a cute vibe, while hard drums and nimble guitar riffs lend an bright rock-ish glow." Alan Jones from Music Week wrote, "Roxette have produced a string of catchy pop smashes, so this frankly rather dreary song from the forthcoming Super Mario Brothers is a bit of a disappointment. What could be anthemic with a little work just sounds pompous." Mike Schiller from PopMatters called the song "awful"; and wrote, "...not only does it sound like corporate pandering, but it's probably the most forced smash-hit wannabe Roxette ever created."

Roxette themselves later dismissed both the song and the associated film, calling the latter a "flop" and "ridiculous". In the liner notes of the duo's first greatest hits compilation, Don't Bore Us, Get to the Chorus!, Fredriksson referred to the track as "not one of our most inspired moments", while Gessle said, "I still like the song, in a way... but if you wanted to make a parody of Roxette, it would probably sound something like this."

== Music video ==
The music video for "Almost Unreal" was directed by Irish director Michael Geoghegan, and stars the British actor Nick Pickard as a young man playing a video game in which he's watching parts of the film, as well as both band members performing the song, ending with him being de-evolved into a reptile like in the film.

== Formats and track listings ==
All music and lyrics were written by Per Gessle.

- 7-inch single and cassette (Australia 8806494 · Europe 8806492 · North America 4KM-44942 · UK EM268)
1. "Almost Unreal" – 3:59
2. "The Heart Shaped Sea" – 4:10
- UK exclusive 12-inch picture disc (12EMPD268)
1. "Almost Unreal" – 3:59
2. "The Heart Shaped Sea" – 4:10
3. "Fingertips '93" – 3:42
- CD single (Europe 8806762 · UK CDEM268)
1. "Almost Unreal" – 3:59
2. "The Heart Shaped Sea" – 4:10
3. "Fingertips '93" – 3:42
4. "Almost Unreal" (AC mix) – 3:56

== Credits and personnel ==
Credits are adapted from the liner notes of The Ballad Hits.

Studios

- Recorded in March 1993 at Mayfair Studios (London, England) and Polar Studios (Stockholm, Sweden)
- Mixed at Mayfair Studios

Musicians

- Marie Fredriksson – lead and backing vocals
- Per Gessle – lead and backing vocals, acoustic guitar, mixing
- Per "Pelle" Alsing – drums
- Vicki Benckert – backing vocals
- Anders Herrlin – bass guitar, engineering, programming
- Jonas Isacsson – electric guitars
- Clarence Öfwerman – keyboards, programming, production, mixing
- Staffan Öfwerman – backing vocals
- Alar Suurna – mixing, engineering

== Charts ==
=== Weekly charts ===
Chart (1993)	Peak position
Australia (ARIA)	17
Austria (Ö3 Austria Top 40)	20
Belgium (Ultratop 50 Flanders)	23
Canada Top Singles (RPM)	29
Canada Adult Contemporary (RPM)	29
Denmark (IFPI)	7
Europe (Eurochart Hot 100)	11
Europe (European Hit Radio)	12
Germany (GfK)	20
Iceland (Íslenski Listinn Topp 40)	9
Ireland (IRMA)	5
Netherlands (Dutch Top 40)	27
Netherlands (Single Top 100)	31
Norway (VG-lista)	6
Spain (AFYVE)	21
Sweden (Sverigetopplistan)	8
Switzerland (Schweizer Hitparade)	15
UK Singles (Official Charts)	7
UK Airplay (Music Week)	12
Uruguay (UPI)	6
US Billboard Hot 100	94
US Adult Contemporary (Billboard)	45
US Cash Box Top 100	88

=== Year-end charts ===
Chart (1993)	Position
Australia (ARIA)	81
Europe (Eurochart Hot 100)	85
Europe (European Hit Radio)	35
Germany (Media Control)	83
Sweden (Topplistan)	51
UK Singles (OCC)	72

== Release history ==
Region	Date	Format(s)	Label(s)	Ref.
Europe	10 May 1993	CD	Capitol	
Australia	7 June 1993	CD; cassette	Capitol; EMI	
Japan	16 June 1993	Mini-CD	Capitol	
United Kingdom	12 July 1993	7-inch vinyl; 12-inch vinyl; CD; cassette	Capitol; EMI United Kingdom	
