= The Big L. =

1991 single by Roxette

Single by Roxette

from the album Joyride
- B-side: "One Is Such a Lonely Number" (demo)
- Released: 12 August 1991
- Recorded: June 1990
- Studio: EMI (Stockholm, Sweden)
- Genre: Pop rock
- Length: 4:29
- Label: EMI
- Songwriter: Per Gessle
- Producer: Clarence Öfwerman

Roxette singles chronology
"Fading Like a Flower (Every Time You Leave)" (1991)	"The Big L." (1991)	"Spending My Time" (1991)

Music video
- "The Big L." on YouTube

"The Big L." is a song by Swedish pop duo Roxette. Written by Per Gessle, it was released on 12 August 1991 by EMI Records as the third single from their third studio album, Joyride (1991). The song is produced by Clarence Öfwerman and became a top-10 hit in Belgium, Ireland and Sweden and was the album's highest-charting single in France, where it reached number 24. Despite a US radio mix of the song appearing on CD versions of the single, it was never released as a single in North America.

== Critical reception ==
Scottish Aberdeen Press and Journal stated that "they can still bang out a decent tune." AllMusic editor Bryan Buss wrote in his review of Joyride, that "The Big L." follows in the successful vein Gessle and Fredriksson mined with "The Look". Swedish Expressen called it a "peppery pop song adorned with details from old rock 'n' roll". I Dag described it as "classic pop that could just as well be Gyllene Tider in the 90s". Kim Såtvedt from Norwegian Laagendalsposten named it a "useful up-tempo song". A reviewer from Music & Media wrote that the song is "again proof of Per Gessle's knack for writing pleasant pop underpinned by rocking beats. The casual but economic production further adds to the song's power."

== Formats and track listings ==
All songs were written and composed by Per Gessle.

- Cassette and 7-inch single (Europe 1364347 · UK EM204)
1. "The Big L." – 4:29
2. "One Is Such a Lonely Number" (Demo, September 1987) – 3:33
- 12-inch single (Europe 1364346)
1. "The Big L." (The Bigger, The Better Mix) – 6:17
2. "The Big L." – 4:29
3. "One Is Such a Lonely Number" (Demo) – 3:33
- CD single (Europe 1364342)
1. "The Big L." – 4:29
2. "One Is Such a Lonely Number" (Demo) – 3:33
3. "The Big L." (The Bigger, The Better Mix) – 6:17
4. "The Big L." (US Mix) – 4:35

== Credits and personnel ==
Credits are adapted from the liner notes of The Rox Box/Roxette 86–06.

Studios

- Recorded in June 1990 at EMI Studios (Stockholm, Sweden)
- Mixed at EMI Studios (Stockholm, Sweden)

Musicians

- Marie Fredriksson – lead vocals, background vocals
- Per Gessle – lead vocals, background vocals, mixing
- Anders Herrlin – programming, engineering
- Jonas Isacsson – electric guitars, acoustic guitars, harmonica
- Clarence Öfwerman – keyboards, programming, production, mixing
- Staffan Öfwerman – background vocals
- Alar Suurna – mixing, engineering

== Charts ==
=== Weekly charts ===
Chart (1991)	Peak position
Australia (ARIA)	20
Austria (Ö3 Austria Top 40)	11
Belgium (Ultratop 50 Flanders)	9
Europe (Eurochart Hot 100)	17
Europe (European Hit Radio)	5
Finland (Suomen virallinen lista)	11
France (SNEP)	24
Germany (GfK)	13
Ireland (IRMA)	9
Luxembourg (Radio Luxembourg)	16
Netherlands (Dutch Top 40)	14
Netherlands (Single Top 100)	15
New Zealand (Recorded Music NZ)	34
Spain (AFYVE)	14
Sweden (Sverigetopplistan)	10
Switzerland (Schweizer Hitparade)	13
UK Singles (OCC)	21
UK Airplay (Music Week)	2

=== Year-end charts ===
Chart (1991)	Position
Belgium (Ultratop 50 Flanders)	65
Europe (European Hit Radio)	38
Germany (Media Control)	96
Sweden (Topplistan)	66

== Release history ==
Region	Date	Format(s)	Label(s)	Ref.
Australia	12 August 1991	7-inch vinyl	EMI	
Europe	26 August 1991	7-inch vinyl; CD	EMI	
Australia	9 September 1991	CD; cassette	EMI	
Japan	16 October 1991	Mini-CD	EMI	
