= Crash! Boom! Bang! (song) =

1994 single by Roxette

Single by Roxette

from the album Crash! Boom! Bang!
- Released: 9 May 1994
- Studio: Capri Digital (Capri, Italy); EMI (Stockholm, Sweden)
- Genre: Pop rock
- Length: 5:02; 4:25 (radio edit)
- Label: EMI
- Songwriter: Per Gessle
- Producer: Clarence Öfwerman

Roxette singles chronology
"Sleeping in My Car" (1994)	"Crash! Boom! Bang!" (1994)	"Fireworks" (1994)

Music video
- "Crash! Boom! Bang!" on YouTube

"Crash! Boom! Bang!" is a song by Swedish pop music duo Roxette, released in May 1994 by EMI Records as the second single from the duo's fifth studio album, Crash! Boom! Bang! (1994). The song, written by Per Gessle and produced by Clarence Öfwerman, became a moderate hit in several European countries, peaking in the top 20 in Austria, Belgium, Finland and Sweden. It spent over five months on the German Singles Chart, peaking at number 31. The accompanying music video for the song, directed by Michael Geoghegan, featured Marie Fredriksson ascending a never-ending circular staircase. It had to be filmed twice before release, due to technical issues.

== Critical reception ==
AllMusic editor Bryan Buss described the song as "tender", complimenting it as "one of the best ballads they've recorded". Larry Flick from Billboard magazine wrote that "given the song's title, you might expect a pop/rocker. However, Swedish duo goes in the opposite musical direction, opting for a twangy, quasi-psychedelic ballad." He also felt that frontwoman Marie Fredriksson "has developed into an impressive singer, rising above a buzzing stew of sitars and strings with ease." Chuck Campbell from Knoxville News Sentinel commented, "Despite its name, "Crash! Boom! Bang!" is an easy listen (though an overlong one) as Gessle's fine pop sensibilites guide the twosome over the smooth terrain of catchy hooks and polished ballads. Fredriksson's sweet vocals are the fuel."

In his weekly UK chart commentary, James Masterton said, "Roxette have made some gorgeous ballads in the past but this one drifts by without ever grabbing the attention and so seems destined to become one of their smaller hits." Pan-European magazine Music & Media wrote, "Sometimes the vocabulary used is a bit confusing. Despite the cartoon-esque words, the title track of the new CD is everything but an earth-shattering rocker. Forget it, it's a classy ballad!" Alan Jones from Music Week gave it a score of four out of five, naming it as "one of Roxette's gentler songs, a slowly building ballad similar to some of Heart's hits. A grower rather than an instant hit, but likely to prove bigger than 'Sleeping in My Car'." People Magazine complimented Fredriksson's vocals on the song as "subtle and graceful". Mark Sutherland from Smash Hits called it a "soppy" ballad and "a lovely title track for the weeds."

== Music video ==
Irish filmmaker Michael Geoghegan, who would go on to direct a total of four music videos for the duo, directed the song's accompanying video, which was inspired by the work of Polish director Zbigniew Rybczyński, and consists of one continuous shot of Marie Fredriksson ascending a never-ending circular staircase. Per Gessle commented that the video had to be recorded twice due to technical issues: "The first version turned out to have technical problems with the audio sync. We had to re-shoot the entire video! The director, Michael, and the insurance company almost had heart attacks. We had to start all over again. No big deal. We regarded [the first version] as a £250,000 rehearsal. Ah, the music biz in those days." The music video was A-listed on German music television channel VIVA in July 1994.

== Formats and track listings ==
All songs were written by Per Gessle.

- 7-inch single and cassette (Australia 8650847 · Europe 8650844 · UK TCEM324 · US 4KM-58240)
1. "Crash! Boom! Bang!" (Radio Edit) – 4:25
2. "Joyride" (Unplugged Version) – 5:35
- CD single (Australia · Europe 8650852)
1. "Crash! Boom! Bang!" – 4:25
2. "Joyride" (Unplugged Version) – 5:35
3. "Run to You" (Demo, December 1992)– 3:45
- UK CD1 (CDEMS324)
1. "Crash! Boom! Bang!" – 5:02
2. "Joyride" (7" Version) – 3:59
3. "The Look" – 3:56
- UK CD2 (CDEM324)
1. "Crash! Boom! Bang!" – 4:25
2. "Joyride" (Unplugged Version) – 5:35
3. "Run to You" (Demo) – 3:45
4. "It Must Have Been Love" – 4:18

== Personnel ==
Personnel are adapted from the liner notes of Don't Bore Us, Get to the Chorus!

- Marie Fredriksson – lead and background vocals
- Per Gessle – mixing
- Per "Pelle" Alsing – drums
- Christer Jansson – percussion
- Jonas Isacsson – acoustic and electric guitars
- Anders Herrlin – bass guitar, programming and engineering
- Mats Holmquist – string arrangement and conducting
- Clarence Öfwerman – keyboards, programming, string arrangement, production and mixing
- Alar Suurna – engineering and mixing
- Stockholms Nya Kammarorkester (credited as SNYKO) – orchestration

== Charts ==
=== Weekly charts ===
Chart (1994)	Peak position
Australia (ARIA)	73
Austria (Ö3 Austria Top 40)	19
Belgium (Ultratop 50 Flanders)	14
Canada Top Singles (RPM)	27
Europe (Eurochart Hot 100)	37
Europe (European AC Radio)	2
Europe (European Hit Radio)	7
Finland (Suomen virallinen lista)	16
Germany (GfK)	31
Iceland (Íslenski Listinn Topp 40)	32
Israel (Israeli Singles Chart)	3
Netherlands (Dutch Top 40)	23
Netherlands (Single Top 100)	23
New Zealand (Recorded Music NZ)	50
Scottish Singles Sales (Official Charts)	74
Spain Airplay (AFYVE)	1
Sweden (Sverigetopplistan)	17
UK Singles (Official Charts)	24
UK Airplay (Music Week)	13

=== Year-end charts ===
Chart (1994)	Position
Belgium (Ultratop 50 Flanders)	77
Netherlands (Dutch Top 40)	199

== Release history ==
Region	Date	Format(s)	Label(s)	Ref.
Europe	9 May 1994	7-inch vinyl; CD	EMI	
United Kingdom	23 May 1994	7-inch vinyl; CD; cassette	EMI	
Australia	27 June 1994	CD; cassette	EMI	
