= List of songs recorded by Roxette =

The following is a list of released songs recorded and performed by Roxette.

Contents:	Top - 0-9 A B C D E F G H I J K L M N O P Q R S T U W Y X Z

The goal here is to capture all songs and their initial source.

Alternate versions are captured as indents following the main song (album) version.

Alternates and B-sides may include other publications beyond the initial source.

Live versions not included unless it was the only or initial source of the song.

== 0–9 ==
- "2 Cinnamon Street" (Super Mario Bros OST, 1993)
- "7Twenty7" (Have a Nice Day, 1999)
  - Demo (The Rox Box/Roxette 86-06, 2006) (Rox Box 15)
- "20 BPM" (Good Karma, 2016)

== A ==
- "A Thing About You" (The Ballad Hits, 2002) (A collection . . ) (XXX) (Rox Box 06) (Rox Box 15)
- "After All" (Charm School, 2011)
  - T&A demo 27/7/10 (Charm School revisited, 2011)
- "All I Ever Wanted" (The Rox Box/Roxette 86-06, 2006)
- "Almost Unreal" (A-Side from "Almost Unreal"/Super Mario Bros OST, 1993) (Don’t bore us ...) (Ballad hits) (A collection . . ) (XXX) (Rox Box 06) (Rox Box 15)
  - Demo Feb 1993 (Roxette Rarities, 1995)
- "Always Breaking My Heart" (The Rox Box/Roxette 86-06, 2006) (Rox Box 15)
- ”Always the Last to Know” (Bag of Trix, 2020)
- "Angel Passing" (Travelling, 2012)
- ”Another Place, Another Time” (Heartland, 1984) (US mini-album of six Gyllene Tider songs featuring Marie & Per and using the name Roxette before the official formation)
  - T&A demo (Joyride 30th)
- "Anyone" (Have a Nice Day, 1999)
- "Anyone/I Love How You Love Me" (The Rox Box/Roxette 86-06, 2006) (Rox Box 15)
- "April Clouds" (Good Karma, 2016) (Rewrite of "Wish You the Best" on the Gessle album The World According to Gessle)

== B ==
- “Beautiful Boy” (Bag of Trix, 2020)
- "Beautiful Things" (Have a Nice Day, 1999)
- ”Before You Go To Sleep” demo (Bag of Trix, 2020)
- "Better Off on Her Own" (B-Side from "Stars", 1999) (The Pop Hits, 2003)
  - Demo (The Rox Box/Roxette 86-06, 2006)
- "Big Black Cadillac" (Charm School, 2011)
  - T&A demo 2/7/10 (Charm School revisited, 2011)
- "Bla Bla Bla Bla Bla (You Broke My Heart)" (The Pop Hits, 2003) (The Rox Box/Roxette 86-06, 2006) (Rox Box 15)
- "Break Another Heart"(Heartland, 1984)
- "Breathe" (The Ballad Hits, 2002) (Rox Box 06) (Rox Box 15)
- "Bringing Me Down to My Knees" (Room Service, 2001)

== C ==
- "Call of the Wild" (Pearls of Passion, 1986)
- "Chances" (Look Sharp!, 1988)
- "Church of Your Heart" (Joyride, 1991)
  - US ac-mix (Joyride 30th, 2021)
  - T&A demo (Joyride 30th, 2021)
- "Cinnamon Street" (Tourism, 1992)
- "Come Back (Before You Leave)" (B-Side from "Joyride", 1991)
  - T&A Demo (Joyride 30th, 2021)
- "Cooper" (Have a Nice Day, 1999)
  - Cooper(Closer to God) (Bag of Trix, 2020)
- "Crash! Boom! Bang!" (Crash! Boom! Bang!, 1994)
  - Single edit (Don't Bore Us, Get to the Chorus - Roxette's Greatest Hits, 1995)(Ballad hits) (A collection . . ) (Rox Box 06) (Rox Box 15)
  - Radio edit (Roxette XXX The 30 Biggest Hits)
- "Crazy About You" (B-Side from "You Don't Understand Me",1995)
- "Crush on You" (Have a Nice Day, 1999)
- "Cry" (Look Sharp!, 1988)
  - Demo (The Rox Box/Roxette 86 - 06) (Rox Box 15)

== D ==
- "Dance Away" (Look Sharp!, 1988)
- "Dangerous" (Look Sharp!, 1988)
  - MTV Unplugged (Roxette Rarities, 1995)
  - Single version (Don't Bore Us, Get to the Chorus - Roxette's Greatest Hits, 1995) (A collection . . ) (Rox Box 15)
  - Swedish single version (Bag of Trix, 2020)
- "(Do You Get) Excited?" (Joyride, 1991)
  - T&A demo (Joyride 30th, 2021)
- "Do You Wanna Go the Whole Way?" (Crash! Boom! Bang!, 1994)
- "Don't Believe in Accidents" (Demo, Spring 1988) (B-Side from "Run to You", 1994)
- "Dream On" (Charm School, 2011)
  - T&A demo 25/1/10 (Charm School revisited, 2011)
- "Dreaming" (Heartland, 1984)
- "Dressed for Success" (Look Sharp!, 1988)
  - U.S. single mix (Roxette Rarities, 1995) (Don’t bore us ...) (The Pop Hits, 2003) (A collection . . ) (XXX) (Rox Box 06) (Rox Box 15)

== E ==
- "Easy Way Out" (Travelling, 2012) (Rewrite of "Walk On, Lonely Eyes")
- "Entering Your Heart" (B-Side from "The Centre Of The Heart", 2001)
- "Every Day" (The Ballad Hits, 2002) (Rox Box 06) (Rox Box 15)
  - Studio Vinden demo (Bag of Trix, 2020)
- "Excuse Me, Sir, Do You Want Me to Check on Your Wife?" (Travelling, 2012)

== F ==
- "Fading Like a Flower (Every Time You Leave)" (Joyride, 1991)
  - US single, Humberto Vatican mix (Joyride 30th, 2021)
  - T&A demo (Joyride 30th, 2021)
- "Fingertips" (Tourism, 1992)
  - Fingertips ‘93 (Roxette Rarities, 1995)
- "Fireworks" (Crash! Boom! Bang!, 1994)
  - Jesus Jones remix (Roxette Rarities, 1995)
- "Fool" (Room Service, 2001)
- "From a Distance" (Good Karma, 2016)
- "From Head to Toe" (Look Sharp! 30th, 2022)
- "From One Heart to Another" (Pearls of Passion, 1986)
  - Montezuma demo (Bag of Trix, 2020)

== G ==
- "Go to Sleep" (Crash! Boom! Bang!, 1994)
  - Skinnarviksringen demo (Bag of Trix, 2020)
- "Good Karma" (Good Karma, 2016)
- "Goodbye to You" (Pearls of Passion, 1986)
  - Montezuma demo (Bag of Trix, 2020)

== H ==
- "Half a Woman, Half a Shadow" (Look Sharp!, 1988)
- "Happy on the Outside" (Charm School, 2011)
  - T&A demo 17/8/05 (Charm School revisited, 2011)
- "Happy Together" (B-Side from "Wish I Could Fly", 1999) (Rox Box 06) (Rox Box 15)
- "Harleys & Indians (Riders in the Sky)" (Crash! Boom! Bang!, 1994)
- "Help" (The Rox Box/Roxette 86-06, 2006) (Rox Box 15) (Trix)
- "Here Comes the Weekend" (Tourism, 1992)
- "Hotblooded" (Joyride, 1991)
  - T&A demo 13/12/90 (Bag of Trix, 2020) (Joyride 30th)
  - T&A demo 23/1/90 (Joyride 30th, 2021)
- "How Do You Do!" (Tourism, 1992)

== I ==
- "I Call Your Name" (Pearls of Passion, 1986)
  - Montezuma demo (Pearls of Passion reissue 1997)
  - Frank Mono-mix (Pearls of Passion reissue 1997)
- "(I Could Never) Give You Up" (Look Sharp!, 1988)
- "I Don't Want To Get Hurt" (Don't Bore Us, Get to the Chorus - Roxette's Greatest Hits, 1995) (Rox Box 06) (Rox Box 15)
- "I Love the Sound of Crashing Guitars" (Crash! Boom! Bang!, 1994)
- "I Remember You" (Joyride, 1991)
  - T&A demo 15/3/90 (Bag of Trix, 2020) (Joyride 30th)
  - T&A demo 1/4/90 (Joyride 30th, 2021)
- "I Want You" (Limited edition single with Eva Dahlgren & Ratata, 1987)
  - Digital Lägerelds mix (B-side from "I Want You" single, 1987)
- "I Was So Lucky" (Have a Nice Day, 1999)
  - Outtake (Bag of Trix, 2020)
- "I'm Glad You Called" (Charm School, 2011)
  - Live Demo Rotterdam 19/11/09 (Charm School revisited, 2011)
- "I'm Sorry" (Crash! Boom! Bang!, 1994)
- "In My Own Way" (Charm School, 2011)
  - T&A demo 8/7/09 (Charm School revisited, 2011)
- "It Hurts" (The Ballad Hits, 2002) (Rox Box 06)
  - T&A demo (Bag of Trix, 2020)
- "It Just Happens" (Good Karma, 2016)
- "It Must Have Been Love" (A-Side from "It Must Have Been Love"/Pretty Woman Soundtrack, 1990) (Ballad hits) (A collection . . ) (XXX) (Rox Box 06) (Rox Box 15)
- "It Must Have Been Love (Christmas for the Broken Hearted)" (A-Side from "It Must Have Been Love (Christmas for the Broken Hearted)", 1987)
- "It Takes You No Time to Get Here" (Room Service, 2001)
  - Outtake (Bag of Trix, 2020)
- "It Will Take a Long Long Time" (Have a Nice Day, 1999)
  - Modern Rock version (The Rox Box/Roxette 86-06, 2006) (Rox Box 15) (Bag of Trix, 2020)
- "It's Possible" (Travelling, 2012)
  - Version 2 (Travelling, 2012)

== J ==
- "Jefferson" (Room Service, 2001)
- "Joy of a Toy" (Pearls of Passion, 1986)
  - Montezuma demo (Bag of Trix, 2020)
- "Joyride" (Joyride, 1991)
  - MTV Unplugged (Roxette Rarities, 1995)
  - Single edit (Don't Bore Us, Get to the Chorus - Roxette's Greatest Hits, 1995) (The Pop Hits, 2003) (A collection . . ) (XXX)
  - Brian Malouf U.S. single (Bag of Trix, 2020) (Joyride 30th)
  - Radio edit (The Rox Box/Roxette 86 - 06) (Rox Box 15)
  - T&A demo (Joyride 30th, 2021)
  - Joyrider T&A demo (Joyride 30th, 2021)
- "June Afternoon" (Don't Bore Us, Get to the Chorus - Roxette's Greatest Hits, 1995) (The Pop Hits, 2003) (XXX) (Rox Box 06) (Rox Box 15)

== K ==
- "Keep Me Waiting" (Tourism, 1992)
- "Knockin' on Every Door" (Joyride, 1991)
  - T&A demo (Joyride 30th, 2021)

== L ==
- "Let Your Heart Dance with Me" (Bag of Trix, 2020)
- "Lies" (Crash! Boom! Bang!, 1994)
- "Like Lovers Do" (Pearls of Passion, 1986)
  - Montezuma demo (Bag of Trix, 2020)
- "Listen to Your Heart" (Look Sharp!, 1988)
  - Swedish single (Don't Bore Us, Get to the Chorus - Roxette's Greatest Hits, 1995) (Ballad hits) (A collection . . ) (XXX) (Rox Box 06) (Rox Box 15)
  - Abbey Road sessions 1995 (Bag of Trix, 2020)
- "Little Girl" (Room Service, 2001)
  - Studio Vinden demo (Bag of Trix, 2020)
- "Little Miss Sorrow" (The Pop Hits, 2003) (Rox Box 06) (Rox Box 15)
- "Looking for Jane" (Room Service, 2001)
- "Love Is All (Shine Your Light On Me)" (Crash! Boom! Bang!, 1994)
- "Love Spins" (The Rox Box/Roxette 86-06, 2006) (Rox Box 15) (Joyride 30th)
- "Lover, Lover, Lover" (Travelling, 2012)

== M ==
- "Make My Head Go Pop" (Room Service, 2001)
- "Makin' Love to You" (The Pop Hits, 2003)
- "Me & You & Terry & Julie" (Travelling, 2012)
- "Milk and Toast and Honey" (Room Service, 2001)
  - Single master (Ballad hits, 2002) (XXX)
- "My World, My Love, My Life" (Room Service, 2001)
- "Myth" (The Rox Box/Roxette 86-06, 2006) (Rox Box 15)

== N ==
- "Never Is a Long Time" (Tourism, 1992)
- "Neverending Love" (Pearls of Passion, 1986)
  - T&A demo (Pearls of Passion reissue, 1997)
  - Frank Mono-mix (Pearls of Passion reissue 1997)
- "New World" (The Rox Box/Roxette 86-06, 2006) (Trix)
- "No One Makes It on Her Own" (Charm School, 2011)
  - T&A Demo 26/7/10 (Charm School revisited, 2011)
  - Alternate version is on the Per Gessle album, Small Town Talk, 2018

== O ==
- "One Is Such a Lonely Number" (B-Side from "The Big L.", 1991)
  - Demo September 1987 (Roxette Rarities, 1995)
- "One Wish" (A Collection of Roxette Hits: Their 20 Greatest Songs!, 2006) (Rox Box 15)
- "Only When I Dream" (Charm School, 2011)
  - T&A demo 7/8/09 (Charm School revisited, 2011)
- "Opportunity Nox" (The Pop Hits, 2003) (XXX) (Rox Box 06) (Rox Box 15)

== P ==
- "Paint" (Look Sharp!, 1988)
- "Pay the Price" (Have a Nice Day, 1999)
- "Pearls of Passion" (B-Side from "Soul Deep", 1987)
  - Montezuma demo (Bag of Trix, 2020)
- "Perfect Day" (Joyride, 1991)
  - T&A demo (Bag of Trix, 2020) (Joyride 30th)
- "Perfect Excuse" (Travelling, 2012) (Original version is on the Per Gessle album Party Crasher)
- "Piece of Cake" (Bag of Trix, 2020)
- "Physical Fascination" (Joyride, 1991)
  - T&A demo (Joyride 30th, 2021)
- "Place Your Love" (Crash! Boom! Bang!, 1994)
- ”Pocketful of Rain” (Bag of Trix, 2020)

== Q ==
- "Queen of Rain" (Tourism, 1992)
  - T&A demo (Joyride 30th, 2021)

== R ==
- "Real Sugar" (Room Service, 2001)
- "Reveal" (A Collection of Roxette Hits: Their 20 Greatest Songs!, 2006)
  - Attic remix (Rox Box 15)
- “Run Run Run” (Heartland, 1984)
  - T&A Demo (Joyride 30th, 2021)
- "Run to You" (Crash! Boom! Bang!, 1994)

== S ==
- "Salvation" (Have a Nice Day, 1999)
- "Secrets That She Keeps" (Pearls of Passion, 1986)
  - T&A demo (Pearls of Passion reissue 1997)
- "Seduce Me" (B-Side from "June Afternoon", 1996) (Rox Box 06) (Rox Box 15)
- "See Me" (B-Side from "Salvation", 1999) (Rox Box 06)
- "Shadow of a Doubt" (Look Sharp!, 1988)
- "She Doesn't Live Here Anymore" (Don't Bore Us, Get to the Chorus - Roxette's Greatest Hits, 1995) (Rox Box 06) (Rox Box 15)
- "She's Got Nothing On (But the Radio)" (Charm School, 2011)
  - Adam Rickfors remix (Charm School revisited, 2011)
  - Adrian Lux remix (Charm School revisited, 2011)
  - T&A Demo 7/8/10 (Charm School revisited, 2011)
- "Silver Blue" (B-Side from "Chances", 1988)
- "Sitting on Top of the World" (Charm School, 2011)
  - T&A demo 13/7/10 (Charm School revisited, 2011)
- "Sleeping in My Car" (Crash! Boom! Bang!, 1994)
  - Single edit (Don't Bore Us, Get to the Chorus - Roxette's Greatest Hits, 1995) (The Pop Hits, 2003) (A collection . . ) (XXX) (Rox Box 06) (Rox Box 15)
  - Stockholm demo (Bag of Trix, 2020)
- "Sleeping Single" (Look Sharp!, 1988)
- "Small Talk" (Joyride, 1991)
  - T&A demo (Joyride 30th, 2021)
- "So Far Away" (Pearls of Passion, 1986)
- "Some Other Summer" (Good Karma, 2016)
- "Soul Deep" (Pearls of Passion, 1986)
  - Tom Lord-Alge mix (Bag of Trix, 2020) (Joyride 30th)
- "Speak to Me" (Charm School, 2011)
  - Bassflow remake (Charm School revisited 2011) (Rox Box 15)
  - T&A Demo 13/7/10 (Charm School revisited, 2011)
- "Spending My Time" (Joyride, 1991)
  - Electric Dance remix (Roxette Rarities, 1995)
  - T&A demo (Joyride 30th, 2021)
- "Staring at the Ground" (Have a Nice Day, 1999)
  - Demo (The Rox Box/Roxette 86-06, 2006) (Rox Box 15)
- "Stars" (Have a Nice Day, 1999)
- "Stupid" (The Pop Hits, 2003) (Original version is on the Gessle album, The World According to Gessle)
- "Surrender" (Pearls of Passion, 1986)
- ”Sweet Thing” (Joyride 30th, 2021)

== T ==
- "Teaser Japanese" (Heartland, 1984)
- "The Big L." (Joyride, 1991)
  - T&A demo 29/3/90 (Bag of Trix, 2020) (Joyride 30th)
  - T&A demo 1/4/90 (Joyride 30th, 2021)
- "The Centre of the Heart (Is a Suburb to the Brain)" (Room Service, 2001)
  - Outtake (Bag of Trix, 2020)
- "The First Girl on the Moon" (Crash! Boom! Bang!, 1994)
- "The Heart Shaped Sea" (Tourism, 1992)
- "The Rain" (Tourism, 1992)
- "The Sweet Hello, the Sad Goodbye" (B-Side from "Spending My Time",1991) (Rarities) (Rox Box 06)
  - Bassflow remake (A Collection of Roxette Hits: Their 20 Greatest Songs!, 2006) (XXX) (Rox Box 15)
  - T&A demo (Joyride 30th, 2021)
- "The Look" (Look Sharp!, 1988)
  - MTV Unplugged (Roxette Rarities, 1995)
  - Abbey road sessions 1995 (Bag of Trix, 2020)
  - 2015 remake
- "The Voice" (B-Side from "Dressed for Success", 1988) (Rarities) (Rox Box 06) (Rox Box 15)
- "The Weight of the World" (The Ballad Hits, 2002) (Rox Box 06) (Rox Box 15)
- "Things Will Never Be the Same" (Joyride, 1991)
  - T&A demo 13/12/90 (Bag of Trix, 2020) (Joyride 30th)
  - T&A demo 17/6/89 (Joyride 30th, 2021)
  - T&A demo 17/9/89 (Joyride 30th, 2021)
- "This One" (Good Karma, 2016)
- "Touched by the Hand of God" (Travelling, 2012)
- "Try (Just a Little Bit Harder)" (Room Service, 2001)
- "Turn of the Tide" (Travelling, 2012)
- "Turn to Me" (B-Side from "It Must Have Been Love (Christmas for the Broken Hearted)",1987)

== V ==
- "View from a Hill" (Look Sharp!, 1988)
- "Voices" (Pearls of Passion, 1986)
- "Vulnerable" (Crash! Boom! Bang!, 1994)
  - Single version (Roxette Rarities, 1995)
  - Single edit (Don't Bore Us, Get to the Chorus - Roxette's Greatest Hits, 1995) (Ballad hits) (Rox Box 06) (Rox Box 15)

== W ==
- "Waiting for the Rain" (Have a Nice Day, 1999)
  - Studio Vinden demo (Bag of Trix, 2020)
- Walk On, Lonely Eyes (T&A demo 16/12/99) (Room Service 25th Anniversary edition)
- "Watercolours in the Rain" (Joyride, 1991)
  - T&A demo (Bag of Trix, 2020) (Joyride 30th)
- "Way Out" (Charm School, 2011)
  - T&A Demo 25/1/10 (Charm School revisited, 2011)
- "What's She Like?" (Crash! Boom! Bang!, 1994)
- "When Love's on the Phone (You Just Have to Answer)" (Heartland, 1984)
- "Why Don't You Bring Me Flowers?" (Good Karma, 2016)
- "Why Dontcha?" (Good Karma, 2016)
- "Wish I Could Fly" (Have a Nice Day, 1999)

== Y ==
- "You Can't Do This to Me Anymore" (Good Karma, 2016)
- "You Can't Put Your Arms Around What's Already Gone" (Have a Nice Day, 1999)
- "You Don't Understand Me" (Don't Bore Us, Get to the Chorus - Roxette's Greatest Hits, 1995) (Ballad hits) (XXX) (Rox Box 06) (Rox Box 15)
  - Abbey Road sessions 1995 (Bag of Trix, 2020)
  - T&A demo (Bag of Trix, 2020)
- "You Make It Sound So Simple" (Good Karma, 2016)
