= The RoxBox!: A Collection of Roxette's Greatest Songs =

Box set by Roxette
- Released: 6 February 2015
- Recorded: 1986–2012
- Genre: Pop rock
- Labels: Roxette Recordings; Parlophone

Roxette chronology
| Roxette XXX – The 30 Biggest Hits (2014) | The RoxBox!: A Collection of Roxette's Greatest Songs (2015) | Good Karma (2016) |

The Roxbox!: A Collection of Roxette's Greatest Songs is the second box set compilation by Swedish pop duo Roxette, released exclusively in Australia on 6 February 2015 by Roxette Recordings and Parlophone. The set was issued in conjunction with the final Australian leg of The Neverending World Tour, which took place the same month the compilation was released.

The Roxbox! is a shortened and updated version of the duo's 2006 box set The Rox Box/Roxette 86–06. Like its predecessor, the set contains the majority of the duo's greatest hits, as well as assorted b-sides, demos and album tracks, although The Roxbox! was updated to include several tracks from the duo's proceeding albums, Charm School (2011) and Travelling (2012), along with two non-album remixes created by Bassflow: "Speak to Me" and "The Sweet Hello, The Sad Goodbye". This set also omits the two DVDs contained on The Rox Box.

== Commercial performance ==
The box set was a commercial success upon release in Australia. It debuted at number twenty before rising to number seventeen on its second week. In all, the album spent seven weeks on the Australian Albums Chart, peaking at number twelve.

== Track listing ==
All songs written by Per Gessle and produced by Clarence Öfwerman, except where noted.

The Roxbox! – CD1
| No. | Title | Writer(s) | Producer(s) | Length |
|---|---|---|---|---|
| 1. | "Neverending Love" (from Pearls of Passion, 1986) | | | 3:27 |
| 2. | "Secrets That She Keeps" (from Pearls of Passion) | | | 3:40 |
| 3. | "Goodbye to You" (from Pearls of Passion) | | | 4:00 |
| 4. | "Soul Deep" (from Pearls of Passion) | | | 3:32 |
| 5. | "The Look" (from Look Sharp!, 1988) | | | 3:56 |
| 6. | "Dressed for Success" (US Single Mix) (from Look Sharp!) | | | 4:11 |
| 7. | "Sleeping Single" (from Look Sharp!) | | | 4:38 |
| 8. | "Paint" (from Look Sharp!) | | | 3:30 |
| 9. | "Dangerous" (Single Version) (from Look Sharp!) | | | 3:49 |
| 10. | "Listen to Your Heart" (Swedish Single Edit) (from Look Sharp!) | Gessle; Mats "MP" Persson | | 5:13 |
| 11. | "The Voice" (Look Sharp! outtake) | | | 4:15 |
| 12. | "Cry" (Demo) | Marie Fredriksson; Gessle | Fredriksson; Gessle | 5:07 |
| 13. | "It Must Have Been Love" (from the Pretty Woman soundtrack, 1990) | | | 4:19 |
| 14. | "Joyride" (Radio Edit) (from Joyride, 1991) | | | 4:00 |
| 15. | "Fading Like a Flower (Every Time You Leave)" (from Joyride) | | | 3:52 |
| 16. | "Spending My Time" (from Joyride) | Gessle; Persson | | 4:35 |
| 17. | "Watercolours in the Rain" (from Joyride) | Fredriksson; Gessle | | 3:39 |
| 18. | "Church of Your Heart" (from Joyride) | | | 3:23 |
| 19. | "Perfect Day" (from Joyride) | Gessle; Persson | | 4:05 |
| Total length: | | | | 77:11 |

The Roxbox! – CD2
| No. | Title | Writer(s) | Producer(s) | Length |
|---|---|---|---|---|
| 1. | "The Big L." (from Joyride) | | | 4:28 |
| 2. | "(Do You Get) Excited?" (from Joyride) | Gessle; Persson | | 4:15 |
| 3. | "Things Will Never Be the Same" (from Joyride) | | | 4:26 |
| 4. | "Love Spins" (Demo) | | Gessle | 3:28 |
| 5. | "Seduce Me" (Demo) | Fredriksson; Gessle | Fredriksson; Gessle | 3:54 |
| 6. | "How Do You Do!" (from Tourism, 1992) | | | 3:09 |
| 7. | "The Heart Shaped Sea" (from Tourism) | | | 4:18 |
| 8. | "The Rain" (from Tourism) | | | 4:49 |
| 9. | "Never Is a Long Time" (from Tourism) | | | 3:44 |
| 10. | "Silver Blue" (from Tourism) | | | 4:06 |
| 11. | "Come Back (Before You Leave)" (from Tourism) | | | 4:31 |
| 12. | "Queen of Rain" (from Tourism) | Gessle; Persson | | 4:55 |
| 13. | "Almost Unreal" (from the Super Mario Bros. soundtrack, 1993) | | | 3:52 |
| 14. | "Sleeping in My Car" (Single Edit) (from Crash! Boom! Bang!, 1994) | | | 3:32 |
| 15. | "Crash! Boom! Bang!" (Single Edit) (from Crash! Boom! Bang!) | | | 4:25 |
| 16. | "Vulnerable" (Single Edit) (from Crash! Boom! Bang!) | | | 4:26 |
| 17. | "The First Girl on the Moon" (from Crash! Boom! Bang!) | | | 2:56 |
| 18. | "I'm Sorry" (from Crash! Boom! Bang!) | | | 3:11 |
| 19. | "See Me" (Crash! Boom! Bang! outtake) | Fredriksson; Gessle | | 3:45 |
| Total length: | | | | 76:10 |

The RoxBox! – CD3
| No. | Title | Writer(s) | Producer(s) | Length |
|---|---|---|---|---|
| 1. | "Run to You" (from Crash! Boom! Bang!) | | | 3:35 |
| 2. | "June Afternoon" (from Don't Bore Us, Get to the Chorus!, 1995) | | | 4:06 |
| 3. | "You Don't Understand Me" (from Don't Bore Us, Get to the Chorus!) | Desmond Child; Gessle | | 4:26 |
| 4. | "She Doesn't Live Here Anymore" (from Don't Bore Us, Get to the Chorus!) | Gessle; Persson | Gessle; Michael Ilbert | 4:03 |
| 5. | "I Don't Want to Get Hurt" (from Don't Bore Us, Get to the Chorus!) | | | 4:17 |
| 6. | "Always Breaking My Heart" (Demo) | | Gessle | 3:04 |
| 7. | "Help!" (Live from Abbey Road) | Lennon–McCartney | | 2:56 |
| 8. | "Wish I Could Fly" (from Have a Nice Day, 1999) | | Fredriksson; Gessle; Ilbert; Öfwerman | 4:39 |
| 9. | "You Can't Put Your Arms Around What's Already Gone" (from Have a Nice Day) | | Fredriksson; Gessle; Ilbert; Öfwerman | 3:31 |
| 10. | "Waiting for the Rain" (from Have a Nice Day) | Fredriksson | Fredriksson; Gessle; Ilbert; Öfwerman | 3:38 |
| 11. | "Anyone" (from Have a Nice Day) | | Fredriksson; Gessle; Ilbert; Öfwerman | 4:30 |
| 12. | "Stars" (from Have a Nice Day) | | Fredriksson; Gessle; Ilbert; Öfwerman | 3:56 |
| 13. | "Salvation" (from Have a Nice Day) | | Fredriksson; Gessle; Ilbert; Öfwerman | 4:38 |
| 14. | "Beautiful Things" (from Have a Nice Day) | Fredriksson; Gessle | Fredriksson; Gessle; Ilbert; Öfwerman | 3:47 |
| 15. | "It Hurts" (Have a Nice Day outtake) | | Fredriksson; Gessle; Ilbert; Öfwerman | 3:50 |
| 16. | "Little Miss Sorrow" (Have a Nice Day outtake) | | Fredriksson; Gessle; Ilbert; Öfwerman | 3:54 |
| 17. | "Happy Together" (Have a Nice Day outtake) | | Gessle | 3:55 |
| 18. | "Staring at the Ground" (Demo) | | Gessle | 3:48 |
| 19. | "It Will Take a Long Long Time" (Modern Rock Version) | | Fredriksson; Gessle; Ilbert; Öfwerman | 3:58 |
| Total length: | | | | 74:31 |

The RoxBox! – CD4
| No. | Title | Writer(s) | Producer(s) | Length |
|---|---|---|---|---|
| 1. | "7Twenty7" (Demo) | | Gessle | 3:25 |
| 2. | "Anyone/I Love How You Love Me" (Demo) | Gessle; Larry Kobler; Barry Mann | Gessle | 4:10 |
| 3. | "Myth" | Fredriksson; Gessle | Fredriksson; Mikael Bolyos; Persson | 4:22 |
| 4. | "Real Sugar" (from Room Service, 2001) | | Fredriksson; Gessle; Öfwerman | 3:12 |
| 5. | "The Centre of the Heart" (from Room Service) | | Fredriksson; Gessle; Öfwerman; Ilbert^{[a]} | 3:21 |
| 6. | "Milk and Toast and Honey" (from Room Service) | | Fredriksson; Gessle; Öfwerman | 4:00 |
| 7. | "Jefferson" (from Room Service) | | Fredriksson; Gessle; Öfwerman | 3:50 |
| 8. | "Little Girl" (from Room Service) | Fredriksson | Fredriksson; Gessle; Öfwerman | 3:37 |
| 9. | "The Weight of the World" (Room Service outtake) | | Fredriksson; Gessle; Öfwerman | 2:50 |
| 10. | "Every Day" (Room Service outtake) | Fredriksson; Gessle | Fredriksson; Gessle; Öfwerman | 3:21 |
| 11. | "Bla Bla Bla Bla Bla (You Broke My Heart)" (Demo) | | Gessle | 4:34 |
| 12. | "A Thing About You" (from The Ballad Hits, 2002) | | Gessle; Öfwerman | 3:46 |
| 13. | "Breathe" (from The Ballad Hits) | | Gessle; Öfwerman | 4:31 |
| 14. | "Opportunity Nox" (from The Pop Hits, 2003) | | Fredriksson; Gessle; Öfwerman | 2:57 |
| 15. | "One Wish" | | Gessle; Öfwerman; Christoffer Lundquist | 3:02 |
| 16. | "Reveal" (The Attic Remix) | | Gessle; Öfwerman; Lundquist; The Attic^{[b]} | 3:28 |
| 17. | "She's Got Nothing On (But the Radio)" (from Charm School, 2011) | | Lundquist; Öfwerman; Gessle | 3:33 |
| 18. | "No One Makes It on Her Own" (from Charm School) | | Lundquist; Öfwerman; Gessle | 3:41 |
| 19. | "Speak to Me" (Bassflow Remake) (non-album single, 2011) | | Lundquist; Öfwerman; Gessle; Peter Boström^{[b]} | 3:37 |
| 20. | "It's Possible" (from Travelling, 2012) | | Lundquist; Öfwerman; Gessle | 2:35 |
| 21. | "The Sweet Hello, The Sad Goodbye" (Bassflow Remake) (Radio Edit) (non-album single, 2012) | | Lundquist; Öfwerman; Gessle; Boström^{[b]} | 3:46 |
| Total length: | | | | 75:38 |

Notes

- ^{^a} signifies backing track co-production
- ^{^b} signifies remix and additional production

== Charts ==
| Chart (2015) | Peak position |
|---|---|
| Australian Albums (ARIA) | 12 |

| Chart (2020) | Peak position |
|---|---|
| Swiss Albums (Schweizer Hitparade) | 55 |
