= Ballad & Pop Hits – The Complete Video Collection =

Ballad & Pop Hits - The Complete Video Collection

Video by Roxette
- Released: 17 November 2003
- Recorded: 1987–2003
- Genre: Pop rock
- Length: 254:08
- Language: English
- Label: Roxette Recordings; EMI
- Director: Various

Roxette chronology
All Videos Ever Made & More! (2001)	Ballad & Pop Hits - The Complete Video Collection (2003)	Live: Travelling the World (2013)

Ballad & Pop Hits – The Complete Video Collection is the fourth music video compilation by Swedish pop music duo Roxette, released on 17 November 2003 on DVD by Roxette Recordings and EMI. It features all of the music videos the duo recorded from 1987 to 2003 on one DVD, split into Ballad Hits and Pop Hits. It is a companion piece to the similarly-titled greatest hits compilation albums The Ballad Hits (2002) and The Pop Hits (2003).

== Track listing ==
All songs written by Per Gessle, except "Listen to Your Heart", "Spending My Time", "Queen of Rain", "(Do You Get) Excited?" and "She Doesn't Live Here Anymore" by Gessle and Mats Persson; "You Don't Understand Me" by Gessle and Desmond Child; "Un Día Sin Ti" by Gessle, Persson and Luis Gómez-Escolar. All songs produced by Clarence Öfwerman, except "A Thing About You" and "Opportunity Nox" by Gessle and Öfwerman; "Wish I Could Fly", "Anyone", "Salvation", "Stars" and "The Centre of the Heart" by Marie Fredriksson, Gessle, Michael Ilbert and Öfwerman; "Milk and Toast and Honey" and "Real Sugar" by Fredriksson, Gessle and Öfwerman; "She Doesn't Live Here Anymore" by Gessle and Ilbert.

The Ballad Hits
No.	Title	Director	Length
1.	"A Thing About You"	Jonas Åkerlund	3:43
2.	"It Must Have Been Love"	Doug Freel	4:18
3.	"Listen to Your Heart"	Doug Freel	5:04
4.	"Fading Like a Flower (Every Time You Leave)"	Doug Freel	3:56
5.	"Spending My Time"	Wayne Isham	4:45
6.	"Queen of Rain"	Matt Murray	5:00
7.	"Almost Unreal"	Michael Geoghegan	4:18
8.	"Crash! Boom! Bang!"	Michael Geoghegan	4:53
9.	"Vulnerable"	Jonas Åkerlund	4:28
10.	"You Don't Understand Me"	Greg Masuak	4:30
11.	"Wish I Could Fly"	Jonas Åkerlund	4:40
12.	"Anyone"	Jonas Åkerlund	4:54
13.	"Salvation"	Anton Corbijn	4:15
14.	"Milk and Toast and Honey"	Jesper Hiro	4:12
Total length:			1:02:56

The Pop Hits
No.	Title	Director	Length
15.	"Opportunity Nox"	Jonas Åkerlund & Kristoffer Diös	3:07
16.	"The Look"	Peter Heath	3:55
17.	"Dressed for Success"	Peter Heath	4:09
18.	"Dangerous"	Doug Freel	3:54
19.	"Joyride"	Doug Freel	4:38
20.	"The Big L."	Anders Skog	4:29
21.	"Church of Your Heart"	Wayne Isham	3:25
22.	"How Do You Do!"	Anders Skog	3:14
23.	"Sleeping in My Car"	Michael Geoghegan	3:45
24.	"Run to You"	Michael Geoghegan	3:40
25.	"June Afternoon"	Jonas Åkerlund	4:15
26.	"Stars"	Anton Corbijn	3:58
27.	"The Centre of the Heart"	Jonas Åkerlund	3:27
28.	"Real Sugar"	Jesper Hiro	3:54
Total length:			1:56:46

Rarities
No.	Title	Director	Length
28.	"Neverending Love"	Rikard Petrelius	3:33
29.	"Soul Deep"	Rikard Petrelius	3:52
30.	"I Call Your Name"	Jeroen Kamphoff	3:20
31.	"Chances"	Jeroen Kamphoff	4:05
32.	"(Do You Get) Excited?"	Wayne Isham	4:18
33.	"Fingertips '93"	Jonas Åkerlund	3:45
34.	"Fireworks"	Michael Geoghegan	3:38
35.	"She Doesn't Live Here Anymore"	Jonas Åkerlund	4:04
36.	"Un Día Sin Ti"	Jonas Åkerlund	4:39
Total length:			2:32:00

Documentaries
No.	Title	Director	Length
37.	"The Making of Joyride"	Mats Jonstam	49:56
38.	"Really Roxette"	Peter O Ekberg	52:12
Total length:			4:14:08

== Certifications ==
Region	Certification	Certified units/sales
Argentina (CAPIF)	2× Platinum	16,000^{^}
^{^} Shipments figures based on certification alone.
