= All Videos Ever Made & More! =

All Videos Ever Made & More! - The Complete Collection 1987–2001

Video by Roxette
- Released: 19 November 2001
- Recorded: 1987–2001
- Genre: Pop rock
- Length: 269:10
- Language: English
- Label: Roxette Recordings; EMI
- Director: Various

Roxette chronology
Crash! Boom! Live! (1996)	All Videos Ever Made & More! - The Complete Collection 1987–2001 (2001)	Ballad & Pop Hits – The Complete Video Collection (2003)

All Videos Ever Made & More - The Complete Collection 1987–2001 is the third music video compilation by Swedish pop music duo Roxette, released on 19 November 2001 on DVD by Roxette Recordings and EMI. The video is over 4 hours in length, and features every music video the duo created between 1987 and 2001, as well as numerous rare and unreleased performance videos and two feature-length documentaries created by Sveriges Television: the 1990 documentary "The Making of Joyride", and the 1996 road movie documenting the band on their "Crash! Boom! Bang! Tour".

== Track listing ==
All songs written by Per Gessle, except "Listen to Your Heart", "Spending My Time", "(Do You Get) Excited?", "Queen of Rain" and "She Doesn't Live Here Anymore" by Gessle and Mats Persson; "You Don't Understand Me" by Gessle and Desmond Child; "Un Día Sin Ti" by Gessle, Persson and Luis Gómez-Escolar. All songs produced by Clarence Öfwerman, except "She Doesn't Live Here Anymore" by Gessle and Michael Ilbert; "Wish I Could Fly", "Anyone", "Stars", "Salvation" and "The Centre of the Heart" by Marie Fredriksson, Gessle, Ilbert and Öfwerman; "Real Sugar" and "Milk and Toast and Honey" by Fredriksson, Gessle and Öfwerman.

All Videos Ever Made & More - The Complete Collection 1987–2001
No.	Title	Director	Length
1.	"Neverending Love"	Rikard Petrelius	3:33
2.	"Soul Deep"	Rikard Petrelius	3:52
3.	"I Call Your Name"	Jeroen Kamphoff	3:20
4.	"Chances"	Jeroen Kamphoff	4:05
5.	"The Look"	Peter Heath	3:55
6.	"Dressed for Success"	Peter Heath	4:09
7.	"Listen to Your Heart"	Doug Freel	5:04
8.	"Dangerous"	Doug Freel	3:54
9.	"It Must Have Been Love"	Doug Freel	4:18
10.	"Joyride"	Doug Freel	4:38
11.	"Fading Like a Flower (Every Time You Leave)"	Doug Freel	3:56
12.	"The Big L."	Anders Skog	4:29
13.	"Spending My Time"	Wayne Isham	4:45
14.	"Church of Your Heart"	Wayne Isham	3:25
15.	"(Do You Get) Excited?"	Wayne Isham	4:18
16.	"How Do You Do!"	Anders Skog	3:14
17.	"Queen of Rain"	Matt Murray	5:00
18.	"Fingertips '93"	Jonas Åkerlund	3:45
19.	"Almost Unreal"	Michael Geoghegan	4:18
20.	"Sleeping in My Car"	Michael Geoghegan	3:45
21.	"Crash! Boom! Bang!"	Michael Geoghegan	4:53
22.	"Fireworks"	Michael Geoghegan	3:38
23.	"Run to You"	Jonas Åkerlund	3:40
24.	"Vulnerable"	Jonas Åkerlund	4:28
25.	"You Don't Understand Me"	Greg Masuak	4:30
26.	"June Afternoon"	Jonas Åkerlund	4:15
27.	"She Doesn't Live Here Anymore"	Jonas Åkerlund	4:04
28.	"Un Día Sin Ti"	Jonas Åkerlund	4:39
29.	"Wish I Could Fly"	Jonas Åkerlund	4:40
30.	"Anyone"	Jonas Åkerlund	4:54
31.	"Stars"	Anton Corbijn	3:58
32.	"Salvation"	Anton Corbijn	4:15
33.	"The Centre of the Heart"	Jonas Åkerlund	3:27
34.	"Real Sugar"	Jesper Hiro	3:54
35.	"Milk and Toast and Honey"	Jesper Hiro	4:12
Total length:			2:27:08

Rarities
No.	Title	Director	Length
36.	"Neverending Love" (Original Version)	Lars Lööv	3:23
37.	"It Must Have Been Love (Christmas for the Broken Hearted)"	Unknown director; 1987 performance on STV's Listan chart show	4:47
38.	"I Call Your Name"	Unknown director; 1988 performance on STV's Listan chart show	3:38
39.	"The Look" (Original Version)	Mats Jonstam	4:01
40.	"Silver Blue" (Previously Unreleased)	Doug Freel	4:06
Total length:			2:47:03

Documentaries
No.	Title	Director	Length
41.	"The Making of Joyride"	Mats Jonstam	49:55
42.	"Really Roxette"	Peter O Ekberg	52:12
Total length:			4:29:10

== Charts ==
Chart (2001)	Peak; position
Swedish Videos (Sverigetopplistan)	1
