= A Collection of Roxette Hits: Their 20 Greatest Songs! =

Greatest hits album by Roxette
- Released: 18 October 2006
- Recorded: November 1987 – June 2006
- Genre: Pop rock
- Length: 79:28
- Labels: Roxette Recordings; Capitol
- Producers: Clarence Öfwerman; Per Gessle; Marie Fredriksson; Michael Ilbert; Christoffer Lundquist

Roxette chronology
The Pop Hits (2003)	A Collection of Roxette Hits: Their 20 Greatest Songs! (2006)	The Rox Box (2006)

Singles from Roxette Hits
- 1. "One Wish" Released: 9 October 2006; 2. "Reveal" Released: 10 January 2007

A Collection of Roxette Hits: Their 20 Greatest Songs! is the fourth greatest hits compilation album by Swedish pop duo Roxette, released on 18 October 2006 by Roxette Recordings and Capitol to celebrate 20 years since the release of their debut album, Pearls of Passion. It was issued in conjunction with a six-disc box set, The Rox Box/Roxette 86–06. The duo recorded "One Wish" and "Reveal" in June 2006, their first songs recorded as a duo since vocalist Marie Fredriksson's brain tumour diagnosis four years earlier.

Original deluxe editions of the record featured a bonus DVD containing 18 music videos. It was a commercial success upon release, and went on to be certified gold or platinum in several territories, namely Germany, Ireland, Sweden, Switzerland and the United Kingdom. In 2011, the compilation was reissued in numerous territories to coincide with dates of The Neverending World Tour—this version included the Ballad & Pop Hits – The Complete Video Collection as its bonus DVD. This version was the first to appear on the Australian Album Chart, peaking within the top twenty.

== Background and production ==
The compilation contains two new songs, "One Wish" and "Reveal", which were both released as singles. These were the first new tracks recorded by the duo following vocalist Marie Fredriksson's brain tumour diagnosis in 2002. The songs were recorded and produced by Per Gessle alongside frequent collaborators Clarence Öfwerman and Christoffer Lundquist in June 2006 at The Aerosol Grey Machine in Skåne—a studio where Gessle had recorded the majority of his other work since Fredriksson's diagnosis, including his solo albums Mazarin (2003) and Son of a Plumber (2005), as well as Gyllene Tider's comeback album, Finn 5 fel! (2004). Gessle later said it was a "big mistake to record ["One Wish" and "Reveal"] in Skåne. Marie didn't feel comfortable there. I think she felt excluded."

== Critical reception ==
Professional ratings
Review scores
Source	Rating
AllMusic	4.5/5 stars
Classic Rock	7/10 stars
Expressen	2/5 stars
PopMatters	6/10 stars

James Christopher Monger of AllMusic incorrectly described the compilation as containing just four singles, along with twelve album tracks and two "new cuts, and a couple of remixes", but said that the album "dutifully sums up the hook-filled careers" of Fredriksson and Gessle, whom he called "Swedish pop masters". He also commented on the conjunctive release of this compilation with The Rox Box/Roxette 86–06, writing: "Longtime fans who balked at the group's mammoth six-disc box set will find this concise and impossibly catchy compilation a whole lot easier to digest, both cerebrally and monetarily."

Mike Schiller of PopMatters gave the album a positive review, calling it "the best [Roxette] compilation out there for a pseudo-fan simply looking for all the radio tunes", and saying: "The first half of this collection is full of songs that any child of the late '80s will absolutely recognize, even if the immediate recollection is met with a bit of a blush." He also lamented the duo's drop in popularity in the United States in the late '90s, writing: "Given the latter half of the album, [that's] kind of a shame, because the straightforward, fairly rocking "Sleeping in My Car", and the rather lovely "Milk and Toast and Honey" (which sounds like Dido before Dido was Dido) could have livened up the American pop landscape that had so unfortunately passed them by. Heck, even "Stars" could have made some noise as the best "Ray of Light" knockoff out there." Anders Nunstedt of Swedish publication Expressen was more critical, complaining that the new songs were inferior to the unreleased tracks contained on prior compilations The Ballad Hits (2002) and The Pop Hits (2003), but said that, during their early '90s peak, Roxette "scored an ideal radio sound and made precise pop songs in a different class than the competition".

== Track listing ==
All lyrics are written by Per Gessle, except "No Sé Si Es Amor" by Gessle and Luis Escolar; all music is composed by Gessle, except "Listen to Your Heart" and "Spending My Time" by Gessle and Mats Persson.

A Collection of Roxette Hits: Their 20 Greatest Songs! – Original release
No.	Title	Length
1.	"One Wish"	3:03
2.	"The Look" (from Look Sharp!, 1988)	3:57
3.	"Dressed for Success" (US Single Mix; from Look Sharp!)	4:11
4.	"Listen to Your Heart" (Swedish Single Edit; from Look Sharp!)	5:14
5.	"Dangerous" (Single Version; from Look Sharp!)	3:49
6.	"It Must Have Been Love" (from the Pretty Woman soundtrack, 1990)	4:19
7.	"Joyride" (Single Edit; from Joyride, 1991)	4:02
8.	"Fading Like a Flower (Every Time You Leave)" (from Joyride)	3:53
9.	"Spending My Time" (from Joyride)	4:35
10.	"How Do You Do!" (from Tourism, 1992)	3:11
11.	"Almost Unreal" (from the Super Mario Bros. soundtrack, 1993)	3:58
12.	"Sleeping in My Car" (Single Edit; from Crash! Boom! Bang!, 1994)	3:34
13.	"Crash! Boom! Bang!" (Single Edit; from Crash! Boom! Bang!)	4:26
14.	"Run to You" (from Crash! Boom! Bang!)	3:38
15.	"Wish I Could Fly" (from Have a Nice Day, 1999)	4:42
16.	"Stars" (from Have a Nice Day)	3:58
17.	"The Centre of the Heart" (from Room Service, 2001)	3:24
18.	"Milk and Toast and Honey" (Single Master; from Room Service)	4:04
19.	"A Thing About You" (from The Ballad Hits, 2002)	3:47
20.	"Reveal"	3:43
Total length:		79:28

A Collection of Roxette Hits: Their 20 Greatest Songs! – Original Spanish release
No.	Title	Length
15.	"No Sé Si Es Amor" (from Baladas en Español, 1996)	4:43
16.	"Wish I Could Fly"	4:42
17.	"Stars"	3:58
18.	"The Centre of the Heart"	3:24
19.	"Milk and Toast and Honey"	4:04
20.	"Reveal"	3:43
Total length:		80:24

A Collection of Roxette Hits: Their 20 Greatest Songs! – 2012 Canadian Tour edition
No.	Title	Length
18.	"The Sweet Hello, The Sad Goodbye" (Bassflow Remake; non-album single, 2012)	3:48
19.	"A Thing About You"	3:47
20.	"She's Got Nothing On (But the Radio)" (from Charm School, 2011)	3:34
Total length:		79:03

A Collection of Roxette Hits: Their 20 Greatest Songs! – Deluxe edition bonus DVD (music videos)
No.	Title	Director	Length
1.	"The Look"	Peter Heath	3:55
2.	"Dressed for Success"	Heath	4:09
3.	"Listen to Your Heart"	Doug Freel	5:04
4.	"Dangerous"	Freel	3:54
5.	"It Must Have Been Love"	Freel	4:18
6.	"Joyride"	Freel	4:38
7.	"Fading Like a Flower (Every Time You Leave)"	Freel	3:56
8.	"Spending My Time"	Wayne Isham	4:45
9.	"How Do You Do!"	Anders Skog	3:14
10.	"Almost Unreal"	Michael Geoghegan	4:18
11.	"Sleeping in My Car"	Geoghegan	3:45
12.	"Crash! Boom! Bang!"	Geoghegan	4:53
13.	"Run to You"	Jonas Åkerlund	3:38
14.	"Wish I Could Fly"	Åkerlund	4:38
15.	"Stars"	Anton Corbijn	3:58
16.	"The Centre of the Heart"	Åkerlund	3:27
17.	"Milk and Toast and Honey"	Jesper Hiro	4:12
18.	"A Thing About You"	Åkerlund	3:43
Total length:			74:25

A Collection of Roxette Hits: Their 20 Greatest Songs! – 2011 reissue bonus DVD
No.	Title	Length
1.	"Ballad & Pop Hits – The Complete Video Collection"
Total length:		218:45

== Charts ==
=== Weekly charts ===
Chart (2006–20)	Peak; position
Australian Albums (ARIA)	17
Austrian Albums (Ö3 Austria)	8
Belgian Albums (Ultratop Flanders)	17
Belgian Albums (Ultratop Wallonia)	75
Brazilian Albums (Pro-Música Brasil)	6
Czech Albums (ČNS IFPI)	18
Danish Albums (Hitlisten)	9
Dutch Albums (Album Top 100)	48
European Albums (Billboard)	13
Finnish Albums (Suomen virallinen lista)	40
German Albums (Offizielle Top 100)	21
Hungarian Albums (MAHASZ)	14
Irish Albums (IRMA)	8
Italian Albums (FIMI)	41
Norwegian Albums (VG-lista)	7
Polish Albums (ZPAV)	5
Scottish Albums (OCC)	18
Spanish Albums (Promusicae)	25
Swedish Albums (Sverigetopplistan)	2
Swiss Albums (Schweizer Hitparade)	7
UK Albums (Official Charts)	22

=== Year-end charts ===
Chart (2006)	Position
Swedish Albums (Sverigetopplistan)	85
Swiss Albums (Schweizer Hitparade)	84

== Certifications ==
Region	Certification	Certified units/sales
Germany (BVMI)	Gold	100,000^{^}
Ireland (IRMA)	Platinum	15,000^{^}
Sweden (GLF)	Gold	30,000^{^}
Switzerland (IFPI Switzerland)	Gold	15,000^{^}
United Kingdom (BPI)	Gold	100,000^{^}
^{^} Shipments figures based on certification alone.
