= Reveal (Roxette song) =

Single by Roxette

from the album A Collection of Roxette Hits: Their 20 Greatest Songs!
- Released: 10 January 2007
- Recorded: June 2006
- Studio: The Aerosol Grey Machine, Skåne
- Genre: Pop rock
- Length: 3:43
- Label: Roxette Recordings; Capitol
- Songwriter(s): Per Gessle
- Producer(s): Clarence Öfwerman; Gessle; Christoffer Lundquist

Roxette singles chronology
"One Wish" (2006)	"Reveal" (2007)	"She's Got Nothing On (But the Radio)" (2011)

Alternative Cover
- CD single artwork for the remix version

"Reveal" is a song by Swedish pop music duo Roxette, released on 10 January 2007 as the final single from the duo's fourth greatest hits compilation album, A Collection of Roxette Hits: Their 20 Greatest Songs! (2006). Gessle was reportedly unhappy with the original album version of the track, so a slightly remixed single version was created, incorporating a re-recorded middle 8. Two other remixes were also created: one by Swedish house duo The Attic, and another by record producer Kleerup.

"Reveal" became the duo's 35th and – as of 2021 – final song to enter the Swedish Singles Chart, where it peaked at number 59. Despite peaking outside the top hundred of the Russian Airplay Chart, the song has been played over 22,000 times on Russian radio alone.

== Formats and track listings ==
All lyrics and music by Per Gessle.

- Digital download (Europe 384416–2)
1. "Reveal" (Single Version) – 3:43
- CD single (Europe 388416–0)
1. "Reveal" (The Attic Remix) – 3:29
2. "Reveal" (Kleerup Remix) – 3:34
3. "Reveal" (Single Version) – 3:44
4. "One Wish" (Enhanced Music Video) – 3:10

== Personnel ==
Credits adapted from the liner notes of A Collection of Roxette Hits: Their 20 Greatest Songs!.

- Recorded at The Aerosol Grey Machine, Skåne, Sweden in June 2006
- Mixed by Christoffer Lundquist

Musicians

- Marie Fredriksson — lead and background vocals
- Per Gessle — background vocals, production
- Jens Jansson — drums
- Christoffer Lundquist — background vocals, electric and bass guitars, programming, engineering, production
- Maria Nygren — oboe
- Clarence Öfwerman — piano, synthesizer, programming, production

== Charts ==
Chart (2007)	Peak position
Sweden (Sverigetopplistan)	59
Russian Airplay (Tophit)	106

== Release history ==
Format	Version	Date	Label	Catalog #
Radio airplay	Album version	December 2006	EMI	—
Digital download	Single remix	10 January 2006	EMI; Parlophone	9463 84416–2 5
CD single	Remixes	14 February 2007	Roxette Recordings; Capitol Records	9463 88416–0 9
