= The Pop Hits =

Greatest hits album by Roxette
- Released: 24 March 2003
- Recorded: May 1988 – October 2002
- Genre: Pop
- Length: 56:06
- Label: Roxette Recordings; Capitol
- Producer: Clarence Öfwerman; Per Gessle; Marie Fredriksson; Michael Ilbert

Roxette chronology
The Ballad Hits (2002)	The Pop Hits (2003)	A Collection of Roxette Hits: Their 20 Greatest Songs! (2006)

Singles from The Pop Hits
- 1. "Opportunity Nox" Released: 25 February 2003

The Pop Hits is a compilation album by Swedish duo Roxette, released on 24 March 2003 by Roxette Recordings and Capitol Records. It was the second in a two-part series of "best of" albums released by the duo in quick succession, and was preceded by The Ballad Hits in November 2002. In contrast to that collection, it contains the duo's best known uptempo songs. The album was not as commercially successful as its predecessor, although it did peak within the top twenty of various Scandinavian record charts. It was also certified gold in Brazil.

== Recording and promotion ==
Per Gessle originally planned to record two new songs for The Pop Hits. "Opportunity Nox" was written by Gessle, and first recorded at his Tits & Ass Studios in Halmstad on 4 March 2002. Recording later took place at EMI Studios in Stockholm in October 2002, a month after vocalist Marie Fredriksson's diagnosis of a brain tumour. Due to her illness, the track features very little of Fredriksson's vocals. Her illness also affected the recording of another song intended to appear on the compilation: "I Like It Like That", which Gessle said "was never recorded because Marie got ill, so there was no chance to record it." The track later appeared on Gessle's 2005 album Son of a Plumber. Instead, the compilation concludes with "Little Miss Sorrow", a re-recording of an outtake from the duo's 1999 album Have a Nice Day. "Opportunity Nox" was issued as the compilation's first and only single on 25 February 2003, with an animated music video for the song being directed by Jonas Åkerlund and Kristoffer Diös.

Limited edition units of the compilation contained a bonus EP of three more previously unreleased recordings, along with a song which had previously been released as a b-side on their 1999 single "Stars", "Better Off on Her Own". The EP also included another Have a Nice Day outtake, "Makin' Love to You", which was recorded in January and February 1998. A further two outtakes from the sessions of their 2001 album Room Service are also featured. "Stupid" had originally appeared as the album opener on Per Gessle's 1997 solo album The World According to Gessle, and appears on this album in a slightly re-recorded (in November 2000) form, while "Bla Bla Bla Bla Bla (You Broke My Heart)" was recorded January 2000.

== Critical reception ==
Professional ratings
Review scores
Source	Rating
AllMusic	3/5 stars

Although Heather Phares from AllMusic gave the album a positive review, she wrote that "casual fans will have their needs better-met by a Roxette collection that features their classic ballads as well". She went on to call The Pop Hits "an exhilarating collection of their sugar-buzz pop moments." Tina Kindler of Laut.de said that the album contained "earworm-like pop songs which have a high recognition factor", but lamented the absence of other singles such as "Fingertips '93" and "Fireworks", and was critical of the songs on the bonus disc for not "fitting in to the overall concept. With the exception of "Stupid", the bonus tracks are all very quiet and slow, and would have been better placed on The Ballad Hits." She went on to say that "because Roxette made relatively simple pop music, it wasn't 'cool' to admit to liking Roxette. But it was a completely different story behind closed doors, of course, otherwise one can hardly explain the incredible success of the two Swedes." She summarised by saying: "People who only briefly flirted with Roxette will be overjoyed with this album. And people who enjoy this album no longer need to feel ashamed. Honestly."

== Track listing ==
All tracks are written by Per Gessle.

No.	Title	Length
1.	"Opportunity Nox"	2:59
2.	"The Look" (from Look Sharp!, 1988)	3:58
3.	"Dressed for Success" (US Single Mix; from Look Sharp!)	4:12
4.	"Dangerous" (Remastered Album Version; from Look Sharp!)	3:50
5.	"Joyride" (Single Edit; from Joyride, 1991)	4:01
6.	"The Big L." (from Joyride)	4:30
7.	"Church of Your Heart" (Remastered Version; from Joyride)	3:23
8.	"How Do You Do!" (from Tourism, 1992)	3:12
9.	"Sleeping in My Car" (Single Edit; from Crash! Boom! Bang!, 1994)	3:33
10.	"Run to You" (Remastered Version; from Crash! Boom! Bang!)	3:39
11.	"June Afternoon" (from Don't Bore Us, Get to the Chorus! Roxette's Greatest Hits, 1995)	4:19
12.	"Stars" (Remastered Version; from Have a Nice Day, 1999)	3:57
13.	"The Centre of the Heart" (Remastered Version; from Room Service, 2001)	3:22
14.	"Real Sugar" (from Room Service)	3:17
15.	"Little Miss Sorrow"	3:54
Total length:		56:06

The Pop Hits – Bonus EP
No.	Title	Length
1.	"Stupid" (Roxette Version; previously unreleased)	3:25
2.	"Makin' Love to You" (Have a Nice Day outtake; previously unreleased)	3:52
3.	"Better Off on Her Own" (Have a Nice Day outtake; previously released as a b-side to "Stars")	2:50
4.	"Bla Bla Bla Bla Bla (You Broke My Heart)" (Room Service outtake; previously unreleased)	3:24
Total length:		13:31

== Personnel ==
Credits adapted from the liner notes of The Pop Hits.

- Roxette are Per Gessle and Marie Fredriksson
- Recorded in various studios in Sweden, Italy and Spain between May 1988 and October 2002.
- All songs produced by Clarence Öfwerman, except tracks 1 and 14 by Öfwerman, Per Gessle and Marie Fredriksson; tracks 12 and 15 by Fredriksson, Gessle, Öfwerman and Michael Ilbert; track 13 by Fredriksson, Gessle and Öfwerman with backing track co-production by Ilbert.
- Mixed by Ronny Lahti, Clarence Öfwerman and Per Gessle at Polar Studios, Stockholm.
- Mastered by George Marino at Sterling Sound Studios, New York City in January 2003.

Musicians

- Marie Fredriksson — lead and background vocals; piano (track 12); mixing
- Per Gessle — lead and background vocals; guitars (tracks 1, 9–11, 13–15); harmonica (track 7); kazoo (track 11); engineering; programming and mixing
- Per "Pelle" Alsing — drums (tracks 2, 7, 8)
- Anders Herrlin — bass guitar (tracks 7–11); background vocals (track 4); engineering and programming (tracks 2–10)
- Michael Ilbert — synthesizer (track 12); engineering, programming and mixing (tracks 11–13, 15)
- Jonas Isacsson — guitars (tracks 2–8, 10, 14, 15); harmonica (track 6)
- Christer Jansson — drums (tracks 13–15)
- Christoffer Lundquist — background vocals (tracks 12, 14, 15); bass guitar (tracks 1, 14, 15); electric guitar (tracks 1, 14)
- Clarence Öfwerman — keyboards (tracks 2–10, 13–15); background vocals (track 4); string arrangement (track 11); engineering, programming and mixing
- Staffan Öfwerman — background vocals (tracks 6–9); percussion (track 8); choir conducting (track 12)
- Mats "MP" Persson — electric guitar (tracks 1, 11); drums (track 9); keyboards and tremolo guitar (track 14); engineering (tracks 1, 8)
- Alar Suurna — tambourine (track 9); engineering and mixing (tracks 2–10)

Additional musicians and technical personnel

- Jonas Åkerlund — art direction and design layout
- Micke "Nord" Andersson — drums and tambourine (track 11); acoustic guitar (track 12)
- Vicki Benckert — background vocals (track 8)
- Karla Collantes — choir vocals (track 12)
- Marie Dimberg — management
- Mattias Edwall — photography
- Malin Gille — choir vocals (track 12)
- Cecilia Grothén — choir vocals (track 12)
- Mats Holmquist — string arrangements and conducting (tracks 10, 11, 13)
- Henrik Janson — talkbox (track 4)
- Ronny Lahti — engineering (tracks 1, 13, 14)
- Sven Lindström — liner notes
- Chris Lord-Alge — mixing (track 3)
- Jalle Lorensson — harmonica (track 4)
- Paulina Nilsson — choir vocals (track 12)
- Björn Norén — strings and horns recording engineer (track 11)
- Jackie Öfwerman — choir vocals (track 12)
- Janne Oldaeus — slide guitar (track 4)
- Darina Rönn-Brolin — choir vocals (track 12)
- Sarah Sheppard — art direction and design layout
- Shooting Star — programming (tracks 13, 14)
- Per "Pelle" Sirén — electric guitar (track 9)
- Stockholm Session Strings— orchestration (track 13)
- Stockholms Nya Kammarorkester (credited as SNYKO) — orchestration (tracks 10, 11)
- Sveriges Radios Symfoniorkester — woodwind quartet (track 11)

== Charts and certifications ==
=== Charts ===
Chart (2003)	Peak; position
Austrian Albums (Ö3 Austria)	32
Belgian Albums (Ultratop Flanders)	17
Danish Albums (Hitlisten)	17
Dutch Albums (Album Top 100)	27
Finnish Albums (Suomen virallinen lista)	40
German Albums (Offizielle Top 100)	22
Norwegian Albums (VG-lista)	13
Scottish Albums (OCC)	96
Spanish Albums (Promúsicae)	29
Swedish Albums (Sverigetopplistan)	16
Swiss Albums (Schweizer Hitparade)	27
UK Albums (OCC)	84

=== Certifications ===
Region	Certification	Certified units/sales
Brazil (Pro-Música Brasil)	Gold	50,000^{*}
^{*} Sales figures based on certification alone.
