= Gjesdalbuen =

Local newspaper in Norway

- Owner(s): Amedia (100%)
- Founded: 1990
- Headquarters: Ålgård, Norway
- Website: gbnett.no

Gjesdalbuen is a local newspaper published in Norway. The paper has its headquarters in Ålgård and has been in circulation since 1990.

== History and profile ==
Gjesdalbuen was established by Morten Gjesdal as a free newspaper in 1990. It was part of Nordsjø Media until 2018 when it was sold to Amedia. The paper is published twice per week. As of 2021 Eugen Hammel was the editor-in-chief.

The circulation of Gjesdalbuen was 3,422 copies in 2008. The paper had a circulation of 3,175 copies in 2012. In March 2014 the paper had a readership of 9,000.
