= Opportunity Nox =

Single by Roxette

from the album The Pop Hits
- Released: 25 February 2003
- Recorded: March; October 2002
- Studio: Tits & Ass Studio, Halmstad; Polar Studios, Stockholm
- Genre: Electronic rock; dance-rock
- Length: 2:59
- Label: Roxette Recordings; Capitol
- Songwriter(s): Per Gessle
- Producer(s): Clarence Öfwerman; Gessle; Marie Fredriksson

Roxette singles chronology
"A Thing About You" (2002)	"Opportunity Nox" (2003)	"One Wish" (2006)

Music video
- "Opportunity Nox" on YouTube

"Opportunity Nox" is a song by Swedish pop music duo Roxette, released on 25 February 2003 as the lead single from the duo's third greatest hits compilation album, The Pop Hits (2003).

== Background and recording ==
The song was originally recorded at Per Gessle's Tits & Ass Studios in Halmstad on 4 March 2002. Further recording took place later in October at EMI Studios in Stockholm, a month after vocalist Marie Fredriksson was diagnosed with a brain tumour. Due to her illness, the song features practically none of her vocals: she sings just two line fragments during the song's final chorus.

== Release and promotion ==
The song was issued as the compilation's first and only single on 25 February 2003. Following Fredriksson's diagnosis, neither Roxette or Gessle himself publicly promoted the track, although an animated music video was directed by the duo's longtime collaborator Jonas Åkerlund, as well as Kristoffer Diös. The animation for the video was created by South African animation director Murray John. Despite the lack of promotion, the song became a substantial hit in the duo's native Sweden. It spent two weeks at number 2 on Sveriges Radio P3's Tracks chart, held off the top spot in both weeks by The Cardigans' "For What It's Worth". It also spent two weeks at number 9 on Svensktoppen, becoming the first Roxette song to enter that chart. The single peaked at number 11 on the national Sverigetopplistan sales chart. It was also a minor hit in Germany, Spain, and Switzerland.

The song received positive reviews from various Swedish publications. Per Bjurman of Aftonbladet called it "one of Gessle's strongest songs", and praised the chorus as a "classic distillate of the hardest power pop Per Gessle had knocking around in his Guaranteed-Gold-Disc-Collection—and it hits like a pissed-off hornet's nest." He went on to describe it as their best song since "Dangerous" (1989). Anders Nunstedt of Expressen called it their best up-tempo single since "Joyride" (1991).

== Formats and track listings ==
All songs written by Per Gessle.

- CD Single (Europe 5518972)
1. "Opportunity Nox" – 2:59
2. "Fading Like a Flower (Every Time You Leave)" (Live from Forest National, Brussels on 22 October 2001) – 4:08
3. "Breathe" (Tits & Ass Demo, 10 January 2002) – 4:33

== Personnel ==
Credits adapted from the liner notes of The Pop Hits.

- Recorded at Tits & Ass Studio, Halmstad in December 2001 and Polar Studios, Stockholm in March and October 2002.
- Mixed by Ronny Lahti, Clarence Öfwerman and Per Gessle at Polar Studios, Stockholm.

Musicians

- Per Gessle – lead and background vocals, acoustic, electric and lead guitars, production
- Marie Fredriksson – background vocals and production
- Ronny Lahti – engineering
- Christoffer Lundquist – bass and electric guitars
- Clarence Öfwerman – electric guitars, programming and production
- Mats "MP" Persson – electric guitars and engineering
- Shooting Star – programming

== Charts ==
Chart (2003)	Peak position
Germany (GfK)	69
Spain (AFYVE)	31
Spanish Airplay (AFYVE)	18
Sweden (Sverigetopplistan)	11
Switzerland (Schweizer Hitparade)	87
