= Salvation (Roxette song) =

Single by Roxette

from the album Have a Nice Day
- B-side: "See Me" and "Crazy About You"
- Released: 22 November 1999
- Recorded: January–April 1998
- Studio: El Cortijo Studios, Marbella
- Genre: Pop
- Length: 4:04
- Label: Roxette Recordings; EMI
- Songwriter: Per Gessle
- Producers: Marie Fredriksson; Gessle; Clarence Öfwerman; Michael Ilbert

Roxette singles chronology
"Stars" (1999)	"Salvation" (1999)	"The Centre of the Heart" (2001)

Music video
- "Salvation" on YouTube

"Salvation" is a song by Swedish pop music duo Roxette, released on 22 November 1999 by labels Roxette Recordings and EMI as the fourth and final single from their sixth studio album, Have a Nice Day (1999).

== Release and promotion ==
The song was released on CD as the album's fourth and final single on 22 November 1999, and was backed by two b-sides "See Me" and "Crazy About You"—both outtakes from the duo's 1994 studio album, Crash! Boom! Bang!. "Crazy About You" had previously been released in a slightly remixed form as a b-side to the duo's 1995 single "You Don't Understand Me". This is the first release of the Marie Fredriksson-composed "See Me", a song that would go on to feature on a number of releases: it appeared as a bonus track on deluxe editions of their 2002 compilation The Ballad Hits, and on both Roxette box sets The Rox Box/Roxette 86–06 (2006) and The RoxBox!: A Collection of Roxette's Greatest Songs (2014). A newly recorded version of the song was also released on their ninth studio album, Travelling (2012). The single also includes the music video of preceding single "Stars".

The video for "Salvation" was directed by Dutch director Anton Corbijn, and was shot in both Naples and Amalfi in Italy in October 1999. The song became a top 20 hit in Finland, but failed to replicate the success of preceding singles elsewhere: charting at number 46 in the duo's native Sweden, and at number eighty in Germany. A Spanish-version of the track, titled "Lo siento", achieved minor airplay in Spanish-speaking regions.

== Formats and track listings ==
All lyrics and music by Per Gessle, except "See Me" music by Marie Fredriksson.

- CD single (8879200)
1. "Salvation" (Single Version) – 4:04
2. "See Me" – 3:46
3. "Crazy About You" (Crash! Boom! Bang! Version) – 4:04
4. "Stars" (Enhanced Video) – 3:55

== Personnel ==
Credits adapted from the liner notes of The Ballad Hits.

- Recorded at El Cortijo Studios, Marbella, Spain between January and April 1998
- Mixed by Marie Fredriksson, Per Gessle, Michael Ilbert and Clarence Öfwerman at Mono Music, Stockholm.

Musicians

- Marie Fredriksson – lead and background vocals, keyboards and production
- Per Gessle – background vocals, acoustic guitar, programming and production
- Michael Ilbert – engineering, programming and production
- Jonas Isacsson – electric guitar
- Christoffer Lundquist – background vocals and bass guitar
- Clarence Öfwerman – synthesizer, tubular bells, programming and production

== Charts ==
=== Weekly charts ===
Weekly chart performance
Chart (1999)	Peak position
Finland (Suomen virallinen lista)	18
Germany (GfK)	80
Sweden (Sverigetopplistan)	46

=== Year-end charts ===
Year-end chart performance for "Salvation"
Chart (1999)	Position
Europe Border Breakers (Eurochart Hot 100)	93
