= The Ballad Hits =

Greatest hits album by Roxette
- Released: 4 November 2002
- Recorded: November 1987 – June 2002
- Genre: Pop
- Length: 66:42
- Labels: Roxette Recordings; Capitol
- Producers: Clarence Öfwerman; Per Gessle; Marie Fredriksson; Michael Ilbert

Roxette chronology
Room Service (2001)	The Ballad Hits (2002)	The Pop Hits (2003)

Singles from The Ballad Hits
- 1. "A Thing About You" Released: 14 October 2002

The Ballad Hits is the second greatest hits compilation album by Swedish pop duo Roxette, released on 4 November 2002 by Roxette Recordings and Capitol Records. It was the first of a two-part series of "best of" albums released by the duo in quick succession, and was followed by The Pop Hits in March 2003. Two new songs were recorded specially for The Ballad Hits: lead single "A Thing About You" and "Breathe". The album was a commercial success upon release, and has been certified gold or platinum in a number of territories.

== Release and promotion ==
The album contains two newly recorded songs: "Breathe" and "A Thing About You", which was issued as the album's lead single on 14 October 2002. CD versions of the album released on mainland Europe, as well as Brazil and Russia, feature copy protection. A limited edition of the compilation containing a bonus EP of previously unreleased tracks was also released in select territories. The EP contained "The Weight of the World", "It Hurts" and "Every Day", along with a fourth song, "See Me", which had previously been released as a b-side on the duo's 1999 single "Salvation". Its release in Australia, the United Kingdom and the United States was timed to coincide with Valentine's Day of 2003. The album was due to be promoted by Roxette performing with an orchestra at the pan-European concert series Night of the Proms. However, Roxette had to be pull out of the event when singer Marie Fredriksson was diagnosed with a brain tumour.

== Critical reception ==
Professional ratings
Review scores
Source	Rating
AllMusic	3/5 stars
Uncut	3/5 stars

The compilation received generally positive reviews. William Ruhlmann of AllMusic described Roxette as a "much bigger act in Europe than in America. Indeed, as far as the United States is concerned, there are only five chart entries [on the album], and only three real hits. ... Americans may have lost interest at about the time that Nirvana came roaring in from the Northwest, but Roxette has been consistent, scoring hits throughout the 90's and beyond with their usual practice of attractive pop hooks and Marie Fredriksson's emotive vocals." He summarised by writing that the album contained "plenty of ear candy" and rated it 3 stars out of 5. A writer for Uncut gave a positive review as well, saying that the album contained "not ballads in the conventional folksy sense, but rather, at their best, pomp-rock steamrollers crushing the puny likes of Jennifer Rush with the mighty weight of their sentimentality." They also rated the album 3 stars out of five, and called it "A must for drama queens and pop aficionados alike."

== Commercial performance ==
The album was successful throughout Europe, particularly in Scandinavia. It peaked within the top five in both Denmark and the duo's native Sweden, and was certified gold in both territories for shipments in excess of 25,000 and 30,000 units, respectively. It reached number eight on the Norwegian Albums Chart, and was certified platinum by the IFPI there for sales in excess of 40,000 copies. It also reached the top ten in Belgium, Germany, the Netherlands, and Switzerland, and was certified gold in both of the latter territories for shipments in excess of 40,000 and 20,000 units, respectively.

The Ballad Hits was promoted in the United Kingdom with a high-profile marketing campaign, which included airing commercials for the album during the popular British soap opera Coronation Street over the week leading up to Valentine's Day. The album debuted at number 23 on the UK Albums Chart on the chart dated 9 February 2003, before rising to its peak of number 11 on its second week. It peaked even higher on the Scottish Albums Chart, reaching number seven there. It was certified silver by the British Phonographic Industry for shipments in excess of 60,000 units.

== Track listing ==
All tracks are written by Per Gessle, except tracks 3, 5 and 6 written by Gessle and Mats Persson; track 10 written by Gessle and Desmond Child.

No.	Title	Length
1.	"A Thing About You"	3:51
2.	"It Must Have Been Love" (from the Pretty Woman soundtrack, 1990)	4:19
3.	"Listen to Your Heart" (Swedish Single Edit; from Look Sharp!, 1988)	5:14
4.	"Fading Like a Flower (Every Time You Leave)" (from Joyride, 1991)	3:54
5.	"Spending My Time" (from Joyride)	4:39
6.	"Queen of Rain" (from Tourism, 1992)	4:57
7.	"Almost Unreal" (from the Super Mario Bros. soundtrack, 1993)	3:59
8.	"Crash! Boom! Bang!" (Single Edit; from Crash! Boom! Bang!, 1994)	4:25
9.	"Vulnerable" (Single Version; from Crash! Boom! Bang!)	4:30
10.	"You Don't Understand Me" (from Don't Bore Us, Get to the Chorus! Roxette's Greatest Hits, 1995)	4:28
11.	"Wish I Could Fly" (from Have a Nice Day, 1999)	4:40
12.	"Anyone" (from Have a Nice Day)	4:31
13.	"Salvation" (from Have a Nice Day)	4:38
14.	"Milk and Toast and Honey" (Single Master; from Room Service, 2001)	4:03
15.	"Breathe"	4:34
Total length:		66:42

The Ballad Hits – Japanese bonus tracks
No.	Title	Length
16.	"The Weight of the World" (Room Service outtake; previously released as a b-side to "A Thing About You")	2:52
17.	"It Hurts" (Have a Nice Day outtake; previously unreleased)	3:54
Total length:		73:28

The Ballad Hits – Bonus EP
No.	Title	Writer(s)	Length
1.	"The Weight of the World" (Room Service outtake; previously released as a b-side to "A Thing About You")	Gessle	2:52
2.	"It Hurts" (Have a Nice Day outtake; previously unreleased)	Gessle	3:54
3.	"See Me" (Crash! Boom! Bang! outtake; previously released as a b-side to "Salvation")	Marie Fredriksson; Gessle	3:48
4.	"Every Day" (Room Service outtake; previously unreleased)	Fredriksson; Gessle	3:24
Total length:			13:58

== Personnel ==
Credits adapted from the liner notes of The Ballad Hits.

- Roxette are Per Gessle and Marie Fredriksson
- Recorded in various studios in Sweden, Italy and Spain between November 1987 and June 2002.
- All songs produced by Clarence Öfwerman, except tracks 1 and 15 by Öfwerman and Per Gessle, tracks 11, 12 and 13 by Fredriksson, Gessle, Michael Ilbert and Öfwerman, and track 14 by Fredriksson, Gessle and Öfwerman.
- Mixed by Ronny Lahti, Clarence Öfwerman and Per Gessle at Polar Studios, Stockholm in June 2002.
- Mastered by George Marino at Sterling Sound Studios, New York City in July 2002.

Musicians

- Marie Fredriksson – lead and background vocals; piano (track 2); keyboards (track 13); mixing
- Per Gessle – lead and background vocals; acoustic guitar (tracks 1, 7, 11, 13); 12-stringed acoustic guitar (track 14); string arrangement (track 11); engineering; programming; mixing
- Per "Pelle" Alsing – drums (tracks 2, 3, 7, 8)
- Anders Herrlin – bass guitar (tracks 6, 7, 8, 10); engineering and programming (tracks 2–10)
- Jonas Isacsson – acoustic and electric guitars; additional bass guitar (track 11)
- Christer Jansson – drums (tracks 10, 12, 14); percussion (tracks 8, 11, 12, 14)
- Christoffer Lundquist – background vocals (tracks 1, 11–15); acoustic guitar (track 15); bass guitar (tracks 1, 12, 13); extended-range bass (track 11); zither (track 12)
- Mats "MP" Persson – electric guitar (track 14); string arrangement (track 11); engineering (track 1)
- Clarence Öfwerman – keyboards (tracks 2–12, 14, 15); Synclavier (track 2); tambourine (track 12); synthesizer and tubular bells (track 13); string arrangements (tracks 8, 9, 12); programming

Additional musicians

- Micke Andersson – 12-stringed acoustic and Rickenbacker guitars (track 11)
- Milla Andersson – background vocals (track 1)
- Vicki Benckert – background vocals (track 7)
- Magnus Blom – alto saxophone (track 12)
- Hasse Dyvik – trumpet and flugelhorn (track 12)
- Bo Eriksson – oboe (track 6)
- Anders Evaldsson – trombone (track 12)
- Staffan Öfwerman – background vocals (tracks 4, 7)
- Stockholm Session Strings – orchestration (track 14)
- Stockholms Nya Kammarorkester (credited as SNYKO) – orchestration (tracks 8, 9, 11, 12)

Technical personnel

- Jonas Åkerlund – photography and art direction
- Marie Dimberg – management
- Mattias Edwall – photography
- Humberto Gatica – mixing (track 2)
- Mats Holmquist – string arrangements (tracks 8, 9); conducting (tracks 8, 9, 12, 14)
- Michael Ilbert – string arrangement (track 11); engineering, programming and mixing (tracks 10–13)
- Ronny Lahti – engineering (tracks 1, 14, 15)
- Sven Lindström – liner notes
- Sarah Sheppard – photography and art direction
- Shooting Star – programming (tracks 1, 14, 15)
- Alar Suurna – engineering and mixing (tracks 2–9)

== Charts ==
=== Weekly charts ===
Chart (2002–03)	Peak; position
Austrian Albums (Ö3 Austria)	16
Belgian Albums (Ultratop Flanders)	6
Danish Albums (Hitlisten)	3
Dutch Albums (Album Top 100)	4
Finnish Albums (Suomen virallinen lista)	15
German Albums (Offizielle Top 100)	10
Italian Albums (FIMI)	24
Norwegian Albums (VG-lista)	8
Portuguese Albums (AFP)	21
Scottish Albums (OCC)	7
Spanish Albums (Promúsicae)	20
Swedish Albums (Sverigetopplistan)	5
Swiss Albums (Schweizer Hitparade)	8
UK Albums (Official Charts)	11

=== Year-end charts ===
Chart (2002)	Position
Belgian Albums (Ultratop Flanders)	49
Swedish Albums (Sverigetopplistan)	44
Chart (2003)	Position
Dutch Albums (MegaCharts)	64

== Certifications and sales ==
Region	Certification	Certified units/sales
Brazil (Pro-Música Brasil)	Gold	50,000^{*}
Denmark (IFPI Danmark)	Gold	25,000^{^}
Netherlands (NVPI)	Gold	40,000^{^}
Portugal (AFP)	Gold	20,000^{^}
Sweden (GLF)	Gold	30,000^{^}
Switzerland (IFPI Switzerland)	Gold	20,000^{^}
United Kingdom (BPI) BPI Cert 1	Silver	60,000^{^}
United Kingdom (BPI) BPI Cert 2	Silver	60,000^{‡}
United States	—	14,000
^{*} Sales figures based on certification alone.^{^} Shipments figures based on certification alone.^{‡} Sales+streaming figures based on certification alone.
