= Anyone (Roxette song) =

1999 single by Roxette

Single by Roxette

from the album Have a Nice Day
- Released: 8 May 1999
- Recorded: September 1998
- Studio: Atlantis (Stockholm, Sweden)
- Genre: Pop
- Length: 4:32
- Label: Roxette Recordings; EMI
- Songwriter: Per Gessle
- Producers: Marie Fredriksson; Per Gessle; Clarence Öfwerman; Michael Ilbert

Roxette singles chronology
"Wish I Could Fly" (1999)	"Anyone" (1999)	"Stars" (1999)

Music video
- "Anyone" on YouTube

"Anyone" is a song by Swedish pop music duo Roxette, released on 8 May 1999 as the second single from their sixth studio album, Have a Nice Day (1999). Composed by Per Gessle, the song was inspired by the work of Burt Bacharach and Phil Spector, and the album version of the song was mostly performed in a single take at Atlantis Studios in Stockholm. In Japan, the single was released as a double A-side with "Pay the Price", although no music video was created for that song.

The music video for "Anyone" was directed by Jonas Åkerlund and proved controversial upon release. It ends with a distressed Marie Fredriksson attempting to commit suicide by drowning herself in the ocean, and was banned from airplay on MTV Europe. As a result of this, the song performed poorly on national record charts, becoming a top 30 hit in Belgium, Spain and Switzerland. Its performance on European charts led to EMI UK deciding against releasing the single there, despite it entering the top 50 of the UK airplay chart.

== Composition and style ==
"Anyone" was composed by Per Gessle, who said that he was inspired by the work of Burt Bacharach when writing the song. His original demo recording of the track incorporated a large portion of "I Love How You Love Me", a 1961 single by The Paris Sisters which was produced by Phil Spector. The demo version released as a B-side on this single differs from the original demo, with all trace of "I Love How You Love Me" removed. The original demo was later released on The Rox Box/Roxette 86–06, and also as a bonus track on the 2009 reissue of Have a Nice Day.

Spector was an influence on the song's production aesthetic. With the exception of overdubbed brass instruments, the album version of the track was recorded "almost completely live" in Stockholm's Atlantis Studio in September 1998. Vocalist Marie Fredriksson has described it as one of her favourite Roxette songs. According to Ultimate Guitar, "Anyone" is a pop ballad with a moderately fast tempo of 143 beats per minute. Its basic chord structure during each verse consists of two repetitions of an A–F♯m–C♯m–D–E sequence, followed by a further two repetitions of B–A–Fm–E. The chorus is made up of two sequences of A–F♯m–E, while the bridge consists of E–D–B–A–F♯m–D–B–E.

== Release and promotion ==
In Japan, "Anyone" was released as a double A-side with "Pay the Price" on 8 May 1999, although no music video was created for that song. "Anyone" was released as the album's second single outside Japan on 10 May 1999, backed by multiple B-sides. Included on maxi-single editions was the previously released Abbey Road Studios version of their 1995 single "You Don't Understand Me". Also included was the "Wish I Could Fly" music video, as well as an exclusive, orchestral version of album track "Cooper", subtitled the 'Closer to God Version'. The video for "Anyone" was directed by longtime collaborator Jonas Åkerlund, and was filmed in the Tróia Peninsula region of Portugal. Although an edited version of the video was placed on medium rotation on MTV en Español in the United States, the video was banned from airplay on MTV Europe and other European TV stations as it ended with a scene in which a distressed Fredriksson attempted to commit suicide by drowning herself in the ocean.

== Critical reception ==
Jørn Holmen from Norwegian newspaper Gjesdalbuen called the song "beautiful and pompous" in his review of Have a Nice Day. Hege I. Hanssen from Nordlys described it as an "absolute candlelight-schläger". Brendon Veevers from Renowned for Sound stated that the song is "one of Roxette’s finest recordings". He wrote, "Heartbreak drips from every note on this track with Marie desperately trying to convey to the listener the pain of losing someone that you love and delivering moving lines like “lying awake in an ocean of teardrops, I float away”. The instrumentation of the track is truly epic – the strings are out in full force here and they complement the feeling of despair within this gem."

== Commercial performance ==
The song became a moderate airplay hit on charts across Europe, charting within the top 25 of the Spanish Airplay Chart. With the music video banned, "Anyone" performed poorly on national sales charts, peaking in the top thirty in both Belgium and Switzerland. It peaked at number 35 in the duo's native Sweden, but stalled at number 62 on the German Singles Chart. Following the poor performance of the song on European charts, EMI UK decided against releasing the single there, despite already issuing promotional CD-Rs to various radio stations, DJs and media. Conversely, it performed well in parts of South America, with the Spanish-version of the track – titled "Alguien" – receiving substantial amounts of airplay.

== Formats and track listings ==
All songs written by Per Gessle, except "You Don't Understand Me" written by Gessle and Desmond Child.

- CD single (Europe 8868922)
1. "Anyone" (Radio Edit) – 3:59
2. "Anyone" (Tits & Ass Demo, 29 July 1998) – 4:13
- Japanese CD single (TOCP-40118)
1. "Pay the Price" – 3:48
2. "Anyone" – 4:32
3. "Cooper" (Closer to God Version) – 4:20
4. "Anyone" (Tits & Ass Demo) – 4:13
- CD-Maxi (Europe 8868920)
1. "Anyone" – 4:32
2. "Anyone" (Tits & Ass Demo) – 4:13
3. "Cooper" (Closer to God Version) – 4:20
4. "You Don't Understand Me" (Abbey Road Version, 15 November 1995) – 3:43
5. "Wish I Could Fly" (Enhanced Music Video) – 4:38

== Credits and personnel ==
Credits are adapted from the liner notes of The Ballad Hits.

Studios

- Recorded at Atlantis Studio (Stockholm, Sweden) in September 1998
- Mixed at Mono Music (Stockholm, Sweden)

Musicians

- Marie Fredriksson – lead and background vocals, production, mixing
- Per Gessle – background vocals, production, mixing
- Magnus Blom – alto saxophone
- Hasse Dyvik – trumpet, flugelhorn
- Anders Evaldsson – trombone
- Mats Holmquist – conducting
- Michael Ilbert – engineering, production, mixing
- Jonas Isacsson – electric guitar
- Christer Jansson – drums, percussion, tambourine
- Christoffer Lundquist – background vocals, bass guitar, zither, tambourine, additional snare drum
- Clarence Öfwerman – keyboards, tambourine, string arrangement, production, mixing
- Stockholms Nya Kammarorkester (credited as SNYKO) – strings

== Charts ==
=== Weekly charts ===
Weekly chart performance for "Anyone"
Chart (1999)	Peak position
Belgium (Ultratop 50 Flanders)	30
Czech Republic (IFPI)	3
Germany (GfK)	62
Iceland (Íslenski Listinn Topp 40)	20
Netherlands (Dutch Top 40 Tipparade)	12
Netherlands (Single Top 100)	73
Spain Airplay (AFYVE)	23
Sweden (Sverigetopplistan)	35
Switzerland (Schweizer Hitparade)	30
UK Airplay (Music Week)	42

=== Year-end charts ===
Year-end chart performance for "Anyone"
Chart (1999)	Rank
Europe Border Breakers (Music & Media)	17
