= Wish I Could Fly =

1999 song by Roxette

Single by Roxette

from the album Have a Nice Day
- B-side: "Happy Together"
- Released: 1 February 1999
- Recorded: January; March 1998
- Studio: El Cortijo (Marbella, Spain); Polar (Stockholm, Sweden)
- Genre: Orchestral pop; electronic
- Length: 4:40
- Label: Roxette Recordings; EMI
- Songwriter: Per Gessle
- Producers: Marie Fredriksson; Per Gessle; Clarence Öfwerman; Michael Ilbert

Roxette singles chronology
"No Sé Si Es Amor" (1996)	"Wish I Could Fly" (1999)	"Anyone" (1999)

Alternative cover
- Artwork for the 2000 US version of the single

Music video
- "Wish I Could Fly" on YouTube

"Wish I Could Fly" is a song by Swedish pop music duo Roxette, released on 1 February 1999 as the lead single from their sixth studio album, Have a Nice Day (1999). An orchestral pop ballad containing elements of electronica, the song was written as an experiment by Per Gessle, who was attempting to establish if a prominently-placed drum loop would fit alongside a large orchestra. The track became a sizable hit for the duo, peaking within the top 20 of the Eurochart Hot 100 Singles, and was the most-played song on European radio of 1999. It would also become their final top-40 hit on the UK Singles Chart.

== Composition and style ==
"Wish I Could Fly"
Album version of "Wish I Could Fly". The song became the duo's final hit on the UK Singles Chart.

"Wish I Could Fly" is an orchestral pop ballad which contains elements of electronica. According to the liner notes of the duo's 2002 compilation The Ballad Hits, the song was written by Per Gessle as an experiment to "see how a drum machine loop would fit with a big orchestra, but it quickly evolved into something more substantial." Vocalist Marie Fredriksson has described it as a "very special song to me. One of my all-time favourite Roxette songs. I never get tired of this." A Spanish-language version of the song, titled "Quisiera volar", was included as a bonus track on deluxe edition versions of Have a Nice Day.

According to Ultimate Guitar, "Wish I Could Fly" has a moderately slow tempo of 80 beats per minute. The song is composed around a complex, orchestra-performed chord progression, however, its basic chord structure consists of four repetitions of an B♭–F–Gm–B♭–C sequence during the introduction. Each verse is composed of four repetitions of a Gm–B♭–C sequence, followed by a chorus consisting of F–Dm–Gm–C–F–E♭–B♭–C. The bridge is made up of three progressions of G–C–G–D, followed by two short progressions of a Dm–F–G sequence, while the outro is based around three elongated bars of Cm–E♭–F.

== Critical reception ==
Swedish newspaper Aftonbladet stated that the song "sounds modern but at the same time classic Roxette". AllMusic editor Jason Damas described it as "excellent pop" in his review of Have a Nice Day. Birmingham Evening Mail commented, "Marie Fredricksson and Per Gessle, once considered the hottest thing out of Sweden since ABBA and Volvo, are back with their first new release for four years. It's a simple song, a beautiful ballad with a big production, that's unmistakeably Roxette." Dagens Nyheter called it a "complete with Portishead loops and finger-in-the-air arrangement." Hege I. Hanssen from Norwegian newspaper Nordlys noted it as a "classic Roxette-song", while Brendon Veevers from Renowned for Sound said it is "classic Roxette balladry". Sunday Mirror commented, "Yes, the Swedish rock gods are back! With the same haircuts, the same sound and the same fans. A hit then."

== Commercial performance ==
The song became a sizable hit for the duo, peaking within the top 30 of numerous record charts throughout Europe and ending 1999 as the most-played song on European radio. The single charted highest in Hungary, where it reached number one and in the duo's native Sweden, reaching number four; it was certified gold in the latter country for shipments in excess of 25,000, and it was also certified gold in Italy for shipments of 15,000 units. The single reached the top 10 in Finland, Iceland and Italy, the top 20 in Denmark, Flanders, Norway and Switzerland, and the top 30 in Germany and the Netherlands. It peaked within the top 20 of the Eurochart Hot 100.

Roxette performed the song at numerous high-profile events in the UK, including the annual televised Party in the Park concert at London's Hyde Park, and on BBC One's Top of the Pops. "Wish I Could Fly" peaked at number 11 on the UK Singles Chart, making it their highest-charting single in the country since "Almost Unreal" reached number seven in 1993, although it would also prove to be their final top-40 hit in the UK. Similarly, the song peaked at number 11 on the singles charts of both Austria and Spain, also peaking at number one on the Spanish Airplay Chart. It became the duo's first single since "The Big L." in 1992 to enter the French Singles Chart, albeit spending six weeks on the chart and peaking at number 80.

While Have a Nice Day was not released in the United States, an updated and repackaged edition of their 1995 compilation Don't Bore Us, Get to the Chorus! Roxette's Greatest Hits was released there in September 2000 by Edel Records. This new edition of the compilation included "Wish I Could Fly" and subsequent single "Stars", with the former being serviced to adult contemporary radio formats from July 2000. The song went on to peak at number 27 on Billboard's Adult Contemporary chart and at number 40 on the Adult Top 40.

== Music video ==
The music video of the song was directed by long-time collaborator Jonas Åkerlund, and consists of a compilation of brief shots of different people's lives, prominently featuring Marie alone in her apartment yearning for a missed lover. Shots are sequenced through a moving spotlight that shines through the darkness, illuminating scenes of lovers sleeping or having sex, prostitutes, streets, buses and metro stations, as well as various inanimate objects. In one of those shots, we see Per with his one year old son Gabriel. The video was published on YouTube in November 2010. By November 2020, it has been viewed over 10.2 million times.

== Track listings ==
All songs were written by Per Gessle.

- CD single (Australia · Europe 8865422 · Japan TOCP-40111)
1. "Wish I Could Fly" – 4:40
2. "Happy Together" – 3:55
3. "Wish I Could Fly" (demo, November 1997) – 4:13
- Australian CD2 (8867942)
1. "Wish I Could Fly" – 4:40
2. "Happy Together" – 3:55
3. "The Look" – 3:56
4. "It Must Have Been Love" – 4:19
5. "Joyride" (single version) – 4:02
- UK cassette and CD1 (TCEM-537 · CDEMS-537)
1. "Wish I Could Fly" – 4:40
2. "Happy Together" – 3:55
3. "Wish I Could Fly" (Tee's In-House remix) – 7:57
- UK CD2 (CDEM-537)
1. "Wish I Could Fly" (Tee's radio mix) – 4:02
2. "Wish I Could Fly" (radio edit) – 3:59
3. "Wish I Could Fly" (StoneBridge R&B remix) – 4:32
4. "Wish I Could Fly" (StoneBridge club remix) – 6:34
- European CD-maxi (8867532)
1. "Wish I Could Fly" (Tee's radio mix) – 4:02
2. "Wish I Could Fly" (Tee's In-House remix) – 7:57
3. "Wish I Could Fly" (StoneBridge R&B remix) – 4:32
4. "Wish I Could Fly" (StoneBridge club remix) – 6:34
- 12-inch single (8867536)
1. "Wish I Could Fly" (Tee's In-House remix) – 7:57
2. "Wish I Could Fly" (StoneBridge club remix) – 6:34
3. "Wish I Could Fly" (Stoney's Dub Trax) – 6:10

== Credits and personnel ==
Credits are adapted from the liner notes of The Ballad Hits.

Studios

- Recorded at Polar Studios (Stockholm, Sweden) in January 1998 and at El Cortijo Studios (Marbella, Spain) in March 1998
- Mixed at Mono Music (Stockholm, Sweden)

Musicians

- Marie Fredriksson – lead and background vocals, production, mixing
- Per Gessle – background vocals, acoustic guitar, string arrangements, production, mixing
- Micke "Nord" Andersson – twelve string acoustic and Rickenbacker guitars
- Michael Ilbert – programming, engineering, string arrangements, production, mixing
- Jonas Isacsson – additional bass guitar
- Christer Jansson – tom-toms, cymbals
- Christoffer Lundquist – background vocals, extended-range bass
- Clarence Öfwerman – keyboards, programming, production, mixing
- Mats "MP" Persson – string arrangements
- Stockholms Nya Kammarorkester (credited as SNYKO) – strings

== Charts ==
=== Weekly charts ===
Weekly chart performance for "Wish I Could Fly"
Chart (1999–2000)	Peak position
Australia (ARIA)	57
Austria (Ö3 Austria Top 40)	11
Belgium (Ultratop 50 Flanders)	18
Canada Adult Contemporary (RPM)	65
Denmark (IFPI)	18
Europe (Eurochart Hot 100)	20
Finland (Suomen virallinen lista)	9
France (SNEP)	80
Germany (GfK)	26
Greece (IFPI)	5
Hungary (Mahasz)	1
Iceland (Íslenski Listinn Topp 40)	9
Italy (Musica e dischi)	10
Italy Airplay (Music & Media)	2
Netherlands (Dutch Top 40)	24
Netherlands (Single Top 100)	35
Norway (VG-lista)	13
Scottish Singles Sales (Official Charts)	16
Spain (AFYVE)	11
Spain Airplay (AFYVE)	1
Sweden (Sverigetopplistan)	4
Switzerland (Schweizer Hitparade)	12
UK Singles (Official Charts)	11
UK Airplay (Music Week)	15
US Adult Contemporary (Billboard)	27
US Adult Pop Airplay (Billboard)	40
US CHR/Pop Top 50 (Radio & Records)	48

=== Year-end charts ===
Year-end chart performance for "Wish I Could Fly"
Chart (1999)	Position
Europe Airplay (Music & Media)	16
Europe Border Breakers (Music & Media)	1
Netherlands (Dutch Top 40)	184
Sweden (Hitlistan)	86

== Certifications ==
Certifications and sales for "Wish I Could Fly"
Region	Certification	Certified units/sales
Italy (FIMI)	Gold	25,000^{*}
Sweden (GLF)	Gold	15,000^{^}
^{*} Sales figures based on certification alone.^{^} Shipments figures based on certification alone.

== Release history ==
Release dates and formats for "Wish I Could Fly"
Region	Date	Format(s)	Label(s)	Ref.
Europe	1 February 1999	Maxi CD	Roxette Recordings; EMI	
Japan	17 February 1999	CD	Roxette Recordings; EMI	
United Kingdom	8 March 1999	CD; cassette	Roxette Recordings; EMI	
United States	24 July 2000	Adult contemporary; hot adult contemporary radio	Edel America	
United States	25 July 2000	Contemporary hit radio	Edel America	
