= June Afternoon =

1996 single by Roxette

Single by Roxette

from the album Don't Bore Us, Get to the Chorus! Roxette's Greatest Hits
- B-side: "Seduce Me"
- Released: 8 January 1996
- Recorded: August 1995
- Studio: EMI, Stacken (Stockholm, Sweden)
- Length: 4:15
- Label: EMI
- Songwriter: Per Gessle
- Producer: Clarence Öfwerman

Roxette singles chronology
"The Look '95" (1995)	"June Afternoon" (1996)	"She Doesn't Live Here Anymore" (1996)

Music video
- "June Afternoon" on YouTube

"June Afternoon" is a song by Swedish pop music duo Roxette, released in January 1996 as the second single from their second greatest hits compilation album, Don't Bore Us, Get to the Chorus! Roxette's Greatest Hits (1995). The single was only released in Europe, Australia, and Canada, peaking at number one in the Czech Republic and within the top 40 in numerous territories. Its accompanying music video was directed by Jonas Åkerlund.

Written by Per Gessle, the song was predominantly recorded by members of Gyllene Tider, Gessle's former band. Gessle sang lead on the verses and chorus, while Marie Fredriksson sang the primary bridge. The single was backed by the previously unreleased demo "Seduce Me", which was written by Marie Fredriksson and Gessle for the duo's 1991 album, Joyride. It was later included on the 2006 release of The Rox Box/Roxette 86-06.

== Critical reception ==
Brendon Veevers from British webzine Renowned for Sound noted that "its lyrics are playful and its vibe is sweet bubblegum and sunshine."

== Track listings ==
All songs are written by Per Gessle except "Seduce Me", music by Marie Fredriksson and Gessle; "Listen to Your Heart" music by Gessle and Mats MP Persson.

- European CD single (7243 8 65208 2 1)
1. "June Afternoon" – 4:15
2. "Seduce Me" (Demo, 22 August 1990) – 3:55
- European maxi-CD single (7243 8 65209 2 0)
1. "June Afternoon" – 4:15
2. "Seduce Me" (Demo) – 3:55
3. "June Afternoon" (Demo, 17 July 1994) – 4:14
- UK CD single (CDEM 437)
1. "June Afternoon" – 4:15
2. "Seduce Me" (Demo) – 3:55
3. "It Must Have Been Love" – 4:19
4. "Listen to Your Heart" (Swedish single version) – 5:14

== Credits and personnel ==
Credits are adapted from the liner notes of The Pop Hits.

Recording

- Recorded in August 1995 at EMI Studios and Studio Stacken (Stockholm, Sweden)

Personnel

- Marie Fredriksson – lead (primary bridge) and background vocals
- Per Gessle – lead (main) and background vocals, acoustic and electric guitars, kazoo and mixing
- Micke "Syd" Andersson – drums and tambourine
- Anders Herrlin – bass guitar
- Mats Holmquist – string arrangements and conducting
- Michael Ilbert – engineering and mixing
- Björn Norén – strings and horns recording engineer
- Clarence Öfwerman – string and horn arrangements, production and mixing
- Mats "MP" Persson – acoustic and electric guitars
- Stockholms Nya Kammarorkester (credited as SNYKO) – orchestration
- Sveriges Radios Symfoniorkester – woodwind quartet

== Charts ==
Weekly chart performance for "June Afternoon"
Chart (1996)	Peak position
Australia (ARIA)	118
Belgium (Ultratop 50 Flanders)	33
Canada Top Singles (RPM)	76
Canada Adult Contemporary (RPM)	31
Czech Republic (IFPI CR)	1
European Border Breakers (M&M)	1
Germany (GfK)	57
Hungary (Mahasz)	7
Iceland (Íslenski Listinn Topp 40)	16
Netherlands (Single Tip)	3
Netherlands (Tipparade)	11
Scottish Singles Sales (Official Charts)	62
Spain (AFYVE)	27
Sweden (Sverigetopplistan)	24
Switzerland (Schweizer Hitparade)	35
UK Singles (Official Charts)	52

== Release history ==
Region	Date	Format(s)	Label(s)	Ref.
Europe	8 January 1996	CD	EMI	
United Kingdom	8 July 1996	CD; cassette	EMI United Kingdom	
