= A Thing About You =

Single by Roxette

from the album The Ballad Hits
- B-side: "The Weight of the World"
- Released: 14 October 2002
- Genre: Pop
- Length: 3:51
- Label: Roxette Recordings; Capitol
- Songwriter(s): Per Gessle
- Producer(s): Clarence Öfwerman; Gessle

Roxette singles chronology
"Milk and Toast and Honey" (2001)	"A Thing About You" (2002)	"Opportunity Nox" (2003)

Music video
- "A Thing About You" on YouTube

"A Thing About You" is a song by Swedish pop music duo Roxette, released on 14 October 2002 as the lead single from the duo's second greatest hits compilation album, The Ballad Hits (2002). Their first release following vocalist Marie Fredriksson's brain tumour diagnosis, the song charted in the top forty of numerous national record charts, including Austria, Belgium, Brazil, Germany, Italy, Spain, Sweden, Switzerland and Taiwan. The song received moderate airplay in the United Kingdom via BBC Radio 2, and remains their last single to enter the UK Singles Chart, peaking at number 77. Its music video was directed by longtime collaborator Jonas Åkerlund.

== Formats and track listings ==
All songs written by Per Gessle.

- CD Single (Europe 5515060)
1. "A Thing About You" – 3:51
2. "The Weight of the World" – 2:52
3. "A Thing About You" (Enhanced Video) – 3:43

== Personnel ==
Credits adapted from the liner notes of The Ballad Hits.

- Recorded at Tits & Ass Studio, Halmstad in December 2001 and Polar Studios, Stockholm in March and June 2002.
- Mixed by Ronny Lahti, Clarence Öfwerman and Per Gessle at Polar Studios, Stockholm in June 2002.

Musicians

- Per Gessle – lead and background vocals, acoustic guitar and production
- Marie Fredriksson – background vocals
- Milla Andersson – background vocals
- Jonas Isacsson – electric guitar
- Ronny Lahti – engineering
- Christoffer Lundquist – background vocals and bass guitar
- Clarence Öfwerman – programming and production
- Mats "MP" Persson – engineering
- Shooting Star – programming

== Charts ==
Chart (2002)	Peak position
Austria (Ö3 Austria Top 40)	39
Belgium (Ultratop 50 Flanders)	39
Czech Republic (IFPI)	4
Germany (GfK)	37
Italy (FIMI)	39
Netherlands (Single Top 100)	88
Scotland (The Official Charts Company)	99
Spain (AFYVE)	23
Spanish Airplay (AFYVE)	15
Sweden (Sverigetopplistan)	14
Switzerland (Schweizer Hitparade)	35
UK Singles (OCC)	77
