= The Centre of the Heart =

2001 single by Roxette

Single by Roxette

from the album Room Service
- B-side: "Entering Your Heart"
- Released: 19 March 2001
- Recorded: January 1998; November 2000
- Studio: El Cortijo (Marbella, Spain); Atlantis, Polar (Stockholm, Sweden)
- Genre: Pop
- Length: 3:22
- Label: Roxette Recordings; EMI
- Songwriter(s): Per Gessle
- Producer(s): Clarence Öfwerman; Gessle; Marie Fredriksson; Michael Ilbert (co-producer)

Roxette singles chronology
"Salvation" (1999)	"The Centre of the Heart" (2001)	"Real Sugar" (2001)

Music video
- "The Centre of the Heart" on YouTube

"The Centre of the Heart" is a song by Swedish pop music duo Roxette, released on 19 March 2001 as the lead single from their seventh studio album, Room Service. An uptempo pop song, it was written by Per Gessle and originally demoed in January 1998 during sessions for their previous album Have a Nice Day (1999). The single was backed by an exclusive B-side, "Entering Your Heart", along with several remixes by StoneBridge.

The track became one of the duo's biggest hits in their home country, spending four weeks on top of the Swedish Singles Chart. It also entered the top 10 in Romania and Spain and charted moderately in several other European territories. Longtime collaborator Jonas Åkerlund directed the song's music video, which was Roxette's most expensive and was criticised for negatively portraying women.

== Background and recording ==
The song was written by Per Gessle early in the development stages of Roxette's preceding studio album, Have a Nice Day (1999). It was first demoed in El Cortijo Studios in Marbella, Spain, in January 1998, and is the only track on Room Service to feature a co-production credit for Michael Ilbert.

== Release and promotion ==
The song is officially titled "The Centre of the Heart", although multiple promotional singles were issued which titled the track "The Centre of the Heart (Is a Suburb to the Brain)". Non-album track "Entering Your Heart" appears as a b-side on most editions of the single. An extended version of the b-side, containing an extra verse, also appeared on Japanese editions of Room Service. A maxi single was also issued, containing four remixes of the song by Swedish DJ StoneBridge, as well as an additional remix created by Jens Bjurman and Per Kalenius, titled the 'Yoga Remix'.

Roxette debuted "The Centre of the Heart" live on 23 February during an interval at the Swedish Melodifestivalen 2001. The song's music video was directed by longtime collaborator Jonas Åkerlund and was filmed over three days at The Madonna Inn in California. It remains Roxette's most expensive music video to date, surpassing the budget of "Spending My Time" from their 1991 album, Joyride.

== Commercial performance ==
The song became one of the duo's biggest hits in their home country Sweden, topping the Sverigetopplistan chart for four consecutive weeks and being certified platinum by the Swedish Recording Industry Association for sales in excess of 30,000 copies. It ended 2001 as the 14th-best-selling single in the country. It was also a hit in Spain, topping the Spanish Airplay Chart and peaking at number seven on the national sales chart. The single became a top-twenty hit in Finland, where it charted at number 13, and peaked within the top thirty in Austria, Belgium, and Switzerland. The track peaked at number 31 and spent nine weeks on the German Singles Chart. It was not released as a single in Ireland or the United Kingdom.

== Track listings ==
All songs were written by Per Gessle.

- CD single (Australia 8790312 · Europe 8791712)
1. "The Centre of the Heart" – 3:22
2. "Entering Your Heart" – 3:59
- CD maxi – remixes (8792302)
1. "The Centre of the Heart" – 3:22
2. "The Centre of the Heart" (StoneBridge Club Mix Edit) – 3:37
3. "The Centre of the Heart" (StoneBridge Club Mix) – 7:49
4. "The Centre of the Heart" (Yoga Remix) – 3:29
5. "The Centre of the Heart" (StoneBridge Peak Hour Dub) – 6:36
6. "The Centre of the Heart" (StoneBridge More Vox Dub) – 6:36

== Credits and personnel ==
Credits are adapted from the liner notes of The Pop Hits.

Studios

- Recorded at El Cortijo Studios (Marbella, Spain) in January 1998 and Atlantis and Polar Studios (Stockholm, Sweden) in November 2000
- Mixed at Polar Studios (Stockholm, Sweden)

Musicians

- Marie Fredriksson – lead and background vocals, production
- Per Gessle – background vocals, electric guitar, production, mixing
- Michael Ilbert – synthesizer, programming, engineering, co-production
- Christoffer Lundquist – background vocals, percussion
- Clarence Öfwerman – keyboards, programming, production, mixing
- Shooting Star – programming
- Strings by Stockholm Session Strings; conducted by Mats Holmquist
- Ronny Lahti – mixing

== Charts ==
=== Weekly charts ===
Chart (2001)	Peak position
Australia (ARIA)	162
Austria (Ö3 Austria Top 40)	30
Belgium (Ultratop 50 Flanders)	21
Belgium (Ultratip Bubbling Under Wallonia)	17
Europe (Eurochart Hot 100)	31
Finland (Suomen virallinen lista)	13
Germany (GfK)	31
Italy (FIMI)	43
Netherlands (Single Top 100)	74
Romania (Romanian Top 100)	3
Spain (PROMUSICAE)	7
Spanish Airplay (AFYVE)	1
Sweden (Sverigetopplistan)	1
Switzerland (Schweizer Hitparade)	28

=== Year-end charts ===
Chart (2001)	Position
Romania (Romanian Top 100)	51
Sweden (Hitlistan)	14

== Certifications ==
Region	Certification	Certified units/sales
Sweden (GLF)	Platinum	30,000^{^}
^{^} Shipments figures based on certification alone.

== Release history ==
Region	Date	Format(s)	Label(s)	Ref.
Europe	19 February 2001	Radio	Roxette Recordings; EMI	
Europe	19 March 2001	CD	Roxette Recordings; EMI	
Australia	30 April 2001	CD	Roxette Recordings; EMI	
