= Milk and Toast and Honey =

2001 single by Roxette

Single by Roxette

from the album Room Service
- Released: 10 September 2001
- Recorded: January; April 2000
- Studio: Atlantis, Polar (Stockholm, Sweden)
- Genre: Pop
- Length: 4:03
- Label: Roxette Recordings; EMI
- Songwriter: Per Gessle
- Producers: Clarence Öfwerman; Per Gessle; Marie Fredriksson

Roxette singles chronology
"Real Sugar" (2001)	"Milk and Toast and Honey" (2001)	"A Thing About You" (2002)

Music video
- "Milk and Toast and Honey" on YouTube

"Milk and Toast and Honey" is a song by Swedish pop music duo Roxette, released on 10 September 2001 as the third and final single from their seventh studio album, Room Service (2001). It was the only single from the album to be released in the United Kingdom, where it peaked at number 89. The song performed better elsewhere, becoming the album's highest-charting single in Portugal, and Roxette's longest-charting single in several years in both Sweden and Switzerland.

== Composition and style ==
The song was written by Per Gessle, who said he had the melody stuck in his head for six months before writing it down and recording a demo in his Tits & Ass recording studio in Halmstad. The liner notes of the duo's 2002 compilation The Ballad Hits describe vocalist Marie Fredriksson as believing the song would be "a piece of cake to sing, but [she] had to work harder than on any other Roxette track to find 'the magic moment'."

This is at odds with Fredriksson's own recollection of recording the song; she later said that she appeared at the recording studio as infrequently as possible during the Room Service sessions, and that she instructed her taxi driver to wait outside the studio while she performed the vocals of "Milk and Toast and Honey". Fredriksson said that she had "lost all desire to continue Roxette", primarily as a result of tension created by co-producer Michael Ilbert during the recording of Roxette's 1999 studio album Have a Nice Day, explaining: "I ended up under [Ilbert's] thumb. He would only communicate with Per and [Roxette's regular producer] Clarence Öfwerman. He complained to everyone that my voice was weak, that I needed to re-record vocals, and that my songs weren't good enough. He criticised me until I started crying. I lost all my confidence, and no longer felt happy in Roxette."

According to Ultimate Guitar, "Milk and Toast and Honey" has a moderately fast tempo of 141 beats per minute. The verse is composed of two repetitions of D♭–Fm/C–B♭m–D♭/A♭–G♭–D♭–A♭7, with the pre-chorus consisting of two short bars of G♭–D♭–A♭. The first chorus is made up of two sequences of D♭–G♭–B♭m–A♭, with subsequent choruses and the outro modified up a whole tone to a repeating pattern of E♭–A♭–Cm–B♭.

== Commercial performance ==
The single was only released commercially in Europe and Australia, and was the only single from Room Service to be released in the United Kingdom, albeit peaking at just number 89 there. It performed moderately well on several European record charts, peaking at number 21 and spending 14 weeks on the Sverigetopplistan chart to become their longest-charting single in their home country since "You Don't Understand Me" in 1995. It performed even better on the Swiss Hitparade: peaking at number 29 and spending 17 weeks on the chart, making it their longest-charting single in that country since "Sleeping in My Car" in 1994.

It became the parent album's biggest hit in various Spanish and Portuguese-speaking territories. It peaked at number five on the Portuguese Singles Chart, and also performed well in neighbouring Spain—reaching number 18 on their airplay chart and number 29 on their national sales chart.

== Formats and track listings ==
All songs written by Per Gessle.

- CD Single (Australia · Europe 8797140)
1. "Milk and Toast and Honey" – 4:03
2. "Milk and Toast and Honey" (Active Dance Remix) – 3:49
3. "Milk and Toast and Honey" (Shooting Star Treatment) – 4:18
4. "Milk and Toast and Honey" (Tits & Ass Demo, 2–3 August 1999) – 4:20
5. "Real Sugar" (Enhanced Video) – 3:27
- UK CD Single (CDEM-604)
1. "Milk and Toast and Honey" (Single Master) – 4:03
2. "Milk and Toast and Honey" (Active Dance Remix) – 3:49
3. "Milk and Toast and Honey" (Shooting Star Treatment) – 4:18
4. "Milk and Toast and Honey" (Enhanced Video) – 4:03
- UK Promo 12" (12EMDJ-604)
1. "Milk and Toast and Honey" (Active Dance Remix, Extended) – 6:11
2. "Milk and Toast and Honey" (Active Dance Remix, Version 2) – 3:48
3. "Milk and Toast and Honey" (Shooting Star Treatment) – 4:18
4. "Milk and Toast and Honey" (Active Dance Remix) – 3:49

== Personnel ==
Credits adapted from the liner notes of The Ballad Hits.

- Recorded at Atlantis and Polar Studios, Stockholm in January and April 2000.
- Mixed by Ronny Lahti, Clarence Öfwerman and Per Gessle at Polar Studios, Stockholm.

Musicians

- Marie Fredriksson – lead and background vocals and production
- Per Gessle – background vocals, 12-stringed acoustic guitar and production
- Jonas Isacsson – electric guitar
- Christer Jansson – drums and cymbals
- Ronny Lahti – engineering
- Christoffer Lundquist – backing vocals
- Clarence Öfwerman – keyboards, programming and production
- Mats "MP" Persson – electric guitar
- Shooting Star – programming
- Strings by Stockholm Session Strings; Conducted by Mats Holmquist

== Charts ==
=== Weekly charts ===
Chart (2001)	Peak position
Australia (ARIA)	197
Belgium (Ultratop 50 Flanders)	49
Belgium (Ultratip Bubbling Under Wallonia)	8
Germany (GfK)	54
Netherlands (Single Top 100)	80
Poland (PiF PaF)	23
Portugal (AFP)	5
Romania (Romanian Top 100)	6
Spain (AFYVE)	29
Spain Airplay (AFYVE)	18
Sweden (Sverigetopplistan)	21
Switzerland (Schweizer Hitparade)	29
UK Singles (OCC)	89

=== Year-end charts ===
Chart (2001)	Position
Brazil (Crowley)	49
Romania (Romanian Top 100)	42

== Release history ==
Region	Date	Format(s)	Label(s)	Ref.
United Kingdom	10 September 2001	CD	Roxette Recordings; EMI	
Australia	29 October 2001	CD	Roxette Recordings; EMI	
