= Stars (Roxette song) =

1999 single by Roxette

Single by Roxette

from the album Have a Nice Day
- B-side: "Better Off on Her Own"
- Released: 26 July 1999
- Recorded: September–October 1998
- Studio: Atlantis, Cosmos (Stockholm, Sweden)
- Genre: Electropop; dance; techno
- Length: 3:56
- Label: Roxette Recordings; EMI
- Songwriter: Per Gessle
- Producers: Marie Fredriksson; Per Gessle; Clarence Öfwerman; Michael Ilbert

Roxette singles chronology
"Anyone" (1999)	"Stars" (1999)	"Salvation" (1999)

Music video
- "Stars" on YouTube

"Stars" is a song by Swedish pop music duo Roxette, released on 26 July 1999 as the third single from their sixth studio album, Have a Nice Day (1999). It was their first – and only – foray into the techno subgenre and features a children's choir in the song's chorus. A remix of the song by production collective Almighty served as the version which was predominantly played on European radio. The song became a hit throughout Europe, particularly in Scandinavia and in Germany, where it became the album's best-performing single. Its music video was directed by Anton Corbijn.

== Background and recording ==
"Stars" was originally demoed as a guitar-driven rock song, but its arrangement was overhauled in the recording studio. It instead became an up-tempo dance, electropop and techno song, which was a new musical direction for Roxette. Lead vocals were performed by Marie Fredriksson, and the song features a children's choir in the chorus. Per Gessle was inspired to incorporate a children's choir in to one of his songs after hearing Keith West's 1967 single "Excerpt from A Teenage Opera".

The song was remixed numerous times. European radio predominantly aired a 7-inch mix of the song by production collective Almighty, although the original album version was used for the music video. Also included on the single was the exclusive b-side "Better Off on Her Own", and demos for two other tracks from Have a Nice Day: "I Was So Lucky" and "7Twenty7".

== Critical reception ==
Jørn Holmen from Gjesdalbuen picked the song as the "highlight" of the record. He wrote that "this techno-embossed song shows that Roxette has partially managed to innovate themselves." Brendon Veevers from Renowned for Sound wrote that "Stars" "showed us exactly what Roxette were capable of doing when they ventured outside of their signature power-ballad comfort zones. Though Have a Nice Day as a whole was techno-coated, Stars showed a prominent change of direction for Roxette. Its children’s-choir chorus and Marie’s power-house vocal delivery are stunning and contrasting features within the tracks electronic and energetic construction."

== Music video ==
The song's music video was directed by Anton Corbijn, and Fredriksson described making it as a "hilarious experience". It begins with a drunken Gessle passed-out in a cardboard box in an alleyway, with a sign emblazoned with the word "Me" hanging around his neck, although he is then transformed into an unidentified man. Meanwhile, Fredriksson awakens in a large bed inside a palace, surrounded by servants, who begin dressing her in royal attire. She leaves the palace and ventures down a crowded street, and is surrounded by men all wearing similar signs around their necks. After stumbling over the man in the cardboard box, she begins reading the song's lyrics to him from a royal decree.

During the song's first chorus, she becomes distracted by a passing children's choir and begins dancing frenetically, dropping the royal decree in the process. Disturbed by the scene, the man runs away and steals a boat, but is chased by Fredriksson who then jumps into the river after him. She once again becomes distracted during the song's second chorus when she is surrounded by a raft of serenading ducks. Enamored by Fredriksson, the man beckons her into the boat, and he emerges from the river carrying her in his arms. They are then seen emerging from a church in wedding attire. The video ends with a series of montages depicting the couple at a large dining room table throughout various stages of their lives: first accompanied by an infant child, then by two teenagers and, finally, as an elderly couple alone, walking arm-in-arm toward the camera.

== Commercial performance ==
The song became a hit throughout Europe, particularly in Scandinavia. The single charted highest in Finland, peaking at number nine. It also charted at number eleven in Norway, and at number thirteen in the duo's native Sweden, where it was certified gold by the Swedish Recording Industry Association for shipments in excess of 15,000 units. It went on to be one of the 100 best-selling singles of 1999 in the country. The song also charted in the top thirty in both Spain and Switzerland, while it became the highest-charting single from Have A Nice Day on the German Singles Chart, peaking at number 23 and spending almost four months on the chart. It became the duo's final single to enter the top 75 of the UK Singles Chart, where it reached number 56. It charted marginally higher – at number 53 – in Scotland. The music video also received a substantial amount of airplay throughout the continent, spending three consecutive weeks at number 19 on MTV Europe's Euro Top 20 chart.

In Italy, the song was featured in two Omnitel (now Vodafone) commercials with Megan Gale that were shown in 2000.

== Track listings ==
All songs were written by Per Gessle.

- European CD single
1. "Stars" (Almighty 7-inch Mix) – 3:48
2. "Better Off on Her Own" – 2:49
3. "I Was So Lucky" (Tits & Ass Demo, 4 June 1998) – 4:13
4. "7Twenty7" (Tits & Ass Demo, 20 November 1997) – 3:28
- UK cassette and CD1
1. "Stars" (Almighty 7-inch Mix) – 3:48
2. "Anyone" – 4:30
3. "Stars" – 3:56
4. "Stars" (Enhanced Video) – 3:55 (CD release only)
- UK CD2
1. "Stars" (Almighty 7-inch Mix) – 3:48
2. "Stars" (Almighty 12-inch Definitive Mix) – 8:00
3. "Stars" (X-Treme Club Mix) – 6:13
- CD-maxi
1. "Stars" (Almighty 7-inch Mix) – 3:48
2. "Better Off on Her Own" – 2:49
3. "I Was So Lucky" (Tits & Ass Demo) – 4:13
4. "7Twenty7" (Tits & Ass Demo) – 3:28
5. "Stars" – 3:56
6. "Anyone" (Enhanced Video) – 4:45
- European CD-maxi 2 and UK 12-inch single – The Remixes
1. "Stars" (Almighty 7-inch Mix) – 3:48
2. "Stars" (Almighty 12-inch Definitive Mix) – 8:00
3. "Stars" (Almighty Dub) – 6:43
4. "Stars" (Almighty Alternate 12-inch Mix) – 7:02
5. "Stars" (X-Treme Club Mix) – 6:13

== Credits and personnel ==
Credits are adapted from the liner notes of The Pop Hits.

Studios

- Recorded between September and October 1998 at Atlantis Studio and Cosmos Studios (Stockholm, Sweden)
- Mixed at Mono Music (Stockholm, Sweden)

Musicians

- Marie Fredriksson – lead and background vocals, piano, production, mixing
- Per Gessle – background vocals, production, mixing
- Micke "Nord" Andersson – acoustic guitars
- Karla Collantes – choir vocals
- Malin Gille – choir vocals
- Cecilia Grothén – choir vocals
- Michael Ilbert – synthesizer, programming, engineering, production, mixing
- Christoffer Lundquist – background vocals
- Paulina Nilsson – choir vocals
- Clarence Öfwerman – synthesizer, programming, production, mixing
- Jackie Öfwerman – choir vocals
- Staffan Öfwerman – choir conducting
- Darina Rönn-Brolin – choir vocals

== Charts ==
=== Weekly charts ===
Weekly chart performance for "Stars"
Chart (1999)	Peak position
Belgium (Ultratop 50 Flanders)	45
Europe (Eurochart Hot 100)	53
Finland (Suomen virallinen lista)	9
Germany (GfK)	23
Netherlands (Dutch Top 40 Tipparade)	20
Netherlands (Single Top 100)	74
Norway (VG-lista)	11
Scotland Singles (OCC)	53
Spain (AFYVE)	19
Sweden (Sverigetopplistan)	13
Switzerland (Schweizer Hitparade)	28
UK Singles (OCC)	56

=== Year-end charts ===
Year-end chart performance for "Stars"
Chart (1999)	Position
Europe (Radio Top 50)	94
Europe Border Breakers (Music & Media)	18
Sweden (Hitlistan)	94

== Certifications ==
Certifications and sales for "Stars"
Region	Certification	Certified units/sales
Sweden (GLF)	Gold	15,000^{^}
^{^} Shipments figures based on certification alone.

== Release history ==
Release dates and formats for "Stars"
Region	Date	Format(s)	Label(s)	Ref.
Europe	26 July 1999	CD	Roxette Recordings; EMI	
United Kingdom	27 September 1999	CD; cassette	Roxette Recordings; EMI	
