= Have a Nice Day (Roxette album) =

Studio album by Roxette
- Released: 22 February 1999
- Recorded: January–October 1998
- Studio: Studio Vinden, Djursholm; Tits & Ass, Halmstad; Atlantis, Stockholm; Cosmos, Stockholm; Polar, Stockholm; El Cortijo, Marbella
- Genre: Pop rock; alternative rock; electronica
- Length: 55:31
- Label: Roxette Recordings; EMI
- Producer: Marie Fredriksson; Per Gessle; Michael Ilbert; Clarence Öfwerman

Roxette chronology
Baladas en Español (1996)	Have a Nice Day (1999)	Room Service (2001)

Singles from Have a Nice Day
- 1. "Wish I Could Fly" Released: 1 February 1999; 2. "Anyone" Released: 8 May 1999; 3. "Stars" Released: 2 August 1999; 4. "Salvation" Released: 22 November 1999

Have a Nice Day is the sixth studio album by Swedish pop duo Roxette, released worldwide from 22 February 1999 by Roxette Recordings and EMI. Recorded over an 18-month period in studios in Sweden and Spain, the album was produced by Marie Fredriksson, Per Gessle, Clarence Öfwerman and Michael Ilbert, and was their first studio album since Crash! Boom! Bang! in 1994. The album was not released in the US, as the duo were no longer signed to a label there. A deluxe edition was released in Spanish-speaking territories and, in Arabian regions, the naked babies on the cover were digitally removed, due to religious concerns.

Gessle and Fredriksson separately recorded numerous demos for the album. These demos incorporated an elaborate level of production, using live instrumentation such as strings and brass instruments. The record features Fredriksson in a more prominent role than on any other Roxette album. She sings lead vocals on all but four of the album's tracks, and it also contains the first Roxette song to be written and composed solely by her: "Waiting for the Rain". The album's production style and aesthetic were inspired by some of Gessle's favourite childhood recording artists, namely Phil Spector, John Lennon and Keith West.

Four singles were released from the album. "Wish I Could Fly" was the most played song on European radio of 1999, and would also become their final top 40 hit on the UK Singles Chart. Conversely, "Anyone" performed poorly on record charts, mainly because of its controversial, Jonas Åkerlund-directed music video, which was banned from airplay on MTV. In Japan, "Anyone" was issued as a double a-side with album track "Pay the Price". Third single "Stars" became a top twenty hit across Europe, and was the album's best performing single on the German Singles Chart. "Salvation" was issued as the final single.

The record was released to generally positive reviews, with several publications commending Roxette for incorporating a more diverse set of musical styles – namely alternative rock and electronica – into their usual pop rock sound. British magazine NME called it a "clever-clever bastard of an album which defies Doctor Rock". Although not as successful as previous studio albums, it performed well commercially. Roxette won the "Best Selling Scandinavian Artist/Group" accolade at the 2000 World Music Awards. As of 2001, it had sold over 2.2 million copies worldwide. The album was remastered and reissued with bonus tracks in 2009, and was ultimately released on vinyl in 2019.

== Background and recording ==
"Crush on You"
Album opener "Crush on You", one of just four songs on the album to feature lead vocals from Per Gessle.

The album was recorded over an 18-month period in various studios, with sessions beginning in Spain in late 1997 and concluding in Sweden in October 1998. It was produced by Roxette members Marie Fredriksson and Per Gessle, their longtime producer Clarence Öfwerman, and mix engineer Michael Ilbert. Gessle worked meticulously on demos for the album at the Tits & Ass recording studio in Halmstad—a studio which he co-founded in 1984 with his then-Gyllene Tider bandmate Mats "MP" Persson. According to Gessle, many of these demos would become "full-fledged" recordings: he would begin by tracking an acoustic guitar in stereo, before laying the foundation for the rest of the song. He and Persson would then incorporate electric guitars, keyboards, programming, live drums and percussion into the mix. Eventually, the quality of the demos progressed to the point where live strings were added. He said: "Some of the songs I sing on the album, like 'Crush on You' and 'You Can't Put Your Arms Around What's Already Gone', are very close to the original demos. I even kept the original vocals, because I feel I'm at my best when I'm doing demos."

Have a Nice Day features Fredriksson in a more prominent role – both vocally and compositionally – than on any other Roxette album. Gessle sings lead vocals on four songs: the aforementioned two, as well as "7Twenty7" and "Cooper", and sings the bridges of another two songs: "Salvation" and "Pay the Price". All other tracks are sung entirely by Fredriksson. She was also much more involved in the album's composition than on preceding releases. During the making of their 1991 album Joyride, Fredriksson indicated that her limited involvement in the writing of Roxette material stemmed from her difficulty in writing lyrics in English, saying that it "feels very strange to write in another language." To combat this, Gessle gave Fredriksson several sets of lyrics to which she could compose music, with her version of "Beautiful Things" eventually being selected as the album closer. The record also contains the first Roxette song to be written and composed solely by Fredriksson: "Waiting for the Rain".

"Waiting for the Rain"
"Waiting for the Rain", the first Roxette song to be composed entirely by Marie Fredriksson. Swedish journalist Håkan Pettersson described it as the best song on the record.

Alongside her husband, Mikael Bolyos, Fredriksson recorded numerous demos for the album at her home studio in Djursholm. Like the demos created by Gessle, Fredriksson's recordings contained an elaborate level of production, incorporating live instrumentation such as piano, keyboards, drums, electronic organs and various brass instruments—namely tenor saxophones, trumpets, flugelhorns and trombones. Several of her demos have since been officially released: "New World" and "Myth" appeared as bonus tracks on the 2009 reissue of Have a Nice Day, and "All I Ever Wanted" featured among the bonus content on the reissue of their next studio album, Room Service (2001). A re-recorded Swedish version of "Always the Last to Know" (retitled "Det som var nu" and featuring Patrik Isaksson), was released as a single from her greatest hits compilation, Äntligen – Marie Fredrikssons bästa 1984–2000. A slightly re-recorded version of another track, "Bad Moon", was later included on her 2004 English-language solo album The Change. The two remaining songs, "Remember" and "Do You Wanna Go With Me", remain unreleased, although all of these demos were leaked onto the internet in 2002 after a former member of EMI staff sold a bootleg CD at a Dutch record fair.

Gessle's intention with the album was to create a modern-sounding, contemporary record that was inspired by the compositional style of his favourite childhood recording artists. He described "Anyone" as a "big, old-fashioned ballad that is very much in the Phil Spector mode." He also said: "I loved John Lennon's 'Instant Karma!' era, because it was sort of stark sounding, with dry tom-toms. On ['Salvation'], we tried to copy the piano sound from 'Mother' [a track on 1970's John Lennon/Plastic Ono Band]. I think it's great to be able to go back into pop history like that." "Stars" juxtaposes techno beats with a children's choir; Gessle had wanted to incorporate a children's choir into one of his songs after hearing Keith West's 1967 single "Excerpt from A Teenage Opera". "I Was So Lucky" was written by Gessle in dedication to his son.

== Release and promotion ==
Prior to the album's release, the duo signed a lucrative new recording contract with their longterm label EMI. Under this new agreement, Fredriksson and Gessle, through their newly formed Roxette Recordings sub-label, obtained full control to the copyrights of their entire back-catalog – both their solo work and their work as Roxette – with the duo licensing their discography for a limited time back to EMI Sweden. Including Have a Nice Day, the deal would encompass three studio albums, with options for further albums afterwards. The duo also entered into negotiations with several record labels – namely RCA, Capitol and Epic – with respect to releasing both Have a Nice Day and their 1995 compilation Don't Bore Us, Get to the Chorus! Roxette's Greatest Hits in the United States. The latter had not been released there, as the relationship between Roxette and the North American branch of EMI collapsed shortly after the release of Crash! Boom! Bang! in 1994. Have a Nice Day would remain unreleased in the US until the album was reissued globally with bonus tracks in 2009, although an updated and repackaged edition of the greatest hits compilation was released in 2000 by Edel Records.

Have a Nice Day was released in Japan on 17 February 1999, in Spain on 22 February, and in Sweden three days later. A wider European release followed throughout March. In Spain, Portugal and parts of Latin America, a special edition of the album was released. This edition included Spanish versions of "Wish I Could Fly", "Anyone" and "Salvation" as bonus tracks. Its artwork also differed from other versions of the record, showing a blue-coloured floor instead of the standard edition's pink one. In Arabian territories, the naked babies on the cover were digitally removed, due to religious concerns.

"Wish I Could Fly" was released as the lead single. It was a sizable hit for the duo, becoming the most played song on European radio of 1999. It peaked within the top twenty of Billboard's European Hot 100 Singles. It would also become the duo's final top 40 hit on the UK Singles Chart, peaking at number 11—their highest-charting single in the country since "Almost Unreal" reached number seven in 1993. Roxette performed the song at numerous high-profile events in the UK, including the annual televised Party in the Park concert at London's Hyde Park, and on BBC One's Top of the Pops. "Anyone" was released as the second single, and performed poorly on record charts. Directed by long-time collaborator Jonas Åkerlund, the controversial video ends with a distressed Fredriksson attempting to commit suicide, and was banned by MTV. The poor performance of the song on European charts resulted in EMI UK refusing to release it as a commercial single there, despite already sending out promo CDs to radio DJs.

The third single to be released from the album was "Stars". Its music video was directed by Anton Corbijn, and Fredriksson described making it as a "hilarious experience"—it featured her singing the song's chorus to a raft of ducks. A techno-driven dance song, it became a top twenty hit across Europe, particularly in Scandinavian countries. The song spent over three months on the German Singles Chart, peaking at number 23—their highest-charting single in Germany since "Sleeping in My Car" reached number 11 in 1994. "Salvation" was released as the fourth and final single, which became a top twenty hit in Finland, but had little success elsewhere. The track "It Will Take a Long Long Time" was featured in the Julia Roberts and Richard Gere romantic comedy Runaway Bride, although it was not included on the soundtrack album. On its twentieth anniversary, Have a Nice Day was issued as a limited edition gatefold double LP yellow vinyl.

== Critical reception ==
Professional ratings
Review scores
Source	Rating
AllMusic	3/5 stars
NA	3/5 stars
NME	4/5 stars

The album received generally positive reviews upon release. Jason Damas of AllMusic commented on how the landscape of pop changed since the release of Crash! Boom! Bang!, saying: "[Over those] five years, Britpop brought alternative rock back towards pop, electronica made dance music cool once more, and bubblegum like the Spice Girls made unabashed pop fun again. ... What resulted, then, was really rather ambitious: Have a Nice Day is an effort to encapsulate Roxette's trademark sound with Britpop and electronica and, by gosh, it works. It's easily as good as any other Roxette album – save maybe only the stellar Joyride – and it shows that, artistically, the band is still on top." However, Damas also noted the "presence of filler, mostly in the form of pace-destroying ballads", but said that was "a small price to pay for the return of one of the best mainstream pop bands of the past decade." Similarly, a writer for NME wrote: "They don't mess about, do these Roxette types. Nary 30 seconds into opening track 'Crush on You', we find them hollering 'I'm messing with a neighbour/Who killed my amp and Fender/He looked so sweet and tender/It's hard to tell his gender'. Snakes alive! What newfangled madness is this?" They went on to call it a "clever-clever bastard of an album which defies Doctor Rock", rating it four stars out of five.

Swedish journalist Håkan Pettersson, reviewing for Nerikes Allehanda, described the album as uneven, calling it "predictable, but occasionally genius". He praised the singles and, in particular, the Fredriksson-composed tracks, describing "Waiting for the Rain" as the best song on the record. He also complimented "Beautiful Things", calling it "symphonic". Retrospective commentary on the record has also been highly positive. A 2013 feature by Brendon Veevers of Renowned for Sound called the album underrated, and said that it "should have catapulted Roxette back to [their commercial] peak", and that it contains "some of the greatest ballads [in] the Roxette catalog". He praised its production, writing: "Still to this day, I hear things that I hadn't noticed before—whether it's a subtle violin in the background, the pinging of a triangle, or a backing vocal placed carefully in the distance. The balance of vocals and instruments has been perfectly weighed". He also praised its consistency, saying that there "isn't one filler on Have a Nice Day." Fred Bronson from Billboard rated it the 20th best album of the year.

== Commercial performance ==
Although not as successful as previous studio albums, Have a Nice Day performed well commercially upon release. As of 2001, it has sold over 2.2 million copies worldwide. The success of the album saw Roxette win the "Best Selling Scandinavian Artist/Group" at the 2000 World Music Awards. The record was particularly successful in Scandinavia. It spent three weeks at number one on the Swedish Albums Chart, and went on to become the 18th best-selling album of the year in the country. It was certified platinum by the Swedish Recording Industry Association for sales in excess of 80,000 copies. It also debuted in the top ten in Denmark, Finland, and Norway, being certified platinum in both the latter territories (denoting shipments of over 20,000 and 50,000 units, respectively).

It was also a success throughout mainland Europe, debuting at number three on Billboard's European Top 100 Albums before rising to number two the following week. It reached number two in both Spain and Switzerland, and was certified platinum in both territories for shipments of over 100,000 and 50,000 units, respectively. The album also debuted at number two in Germany, behind Modern Talking's Alone. It ended 1999 as the 29th best-selling album of the year in the country, and was certified gold by the BVMI for shipments of over 250,000 units. The record peaked at the top spot of the Belgian Albums Chart, and at number three in Austria.

However, the album underperformed in certain territories. Despite the success of "Wish I Could Fly" there, the album stalled at number 28 of the UK Albums Chart–failing to emulate the top five success of all their previous albums. It also performed poorly in Australia, peaking at number 62. It debuted at number 19 in Japan, spending just three weeks on the Oricon chart. For unknown reasons, the album charted at number two on the Canadian Singles Chart, in the chart dated 17 July 1999, according to Billboard.

== Track listing ==
All tracks are written by Per Gessle, except when noted.

Have a Nice Day – Original release
No.	Title	Writer(s)	Length
1.	"Crush on You"		3:35
2.	"Wish I Could Fly"		4:40
3.	"You Can't Put Your Arms Around What's Already Gone"		3:30
4.	"Waiting for the Rain"	Marie Fredriksson	3:37
5.	"Anyone"		4:31
6.	"It Will Take a Long Long Time"		4:03
7.	"7Twenty7"		3:53
8.	"I Was So Lucky"		4:17
9.	"Stars"		3:56
10.	"Salvation"		4:38
11.	"Pay the Price"		3:48
12.	"Cooper"		4:17
13.	"Staring at the Ground"		2:58
14.	"Beautiful Things"	Fredriksson; Gessle	3:48
Total length:			55:31

Have a Nice Day – Spanish and Latin America special release
No.	Title	Translator	Length
15.	"Quisiera volar" (Spanish version of "Wish I Could Fly")	Luis Gómez-Escolar	4:45
16.	"Alguien" (Spanish version of "Anyone")	Gómez-Escolar	4:31
17.	"Lo siento" (Spanish version of "Salvation")	Gómez-Escolar	4:44
Total length:			69:31

Have a Nice Day – 2009 reissue (CD bonus tracks)
No.	Title	Writer(s)	Producer(s)	Length
15.	"It Hurts"		Fredriksson; Gessle; Ilbert; Öfwerman	3:52
16.	"Myth"	Fredriksson; Gessle	Fredriksson; Mikael Bolyos; Mats Persson	4:25
17.	"Makin' Love to You"		Fredriksson; Gessle; Ilbert; Öfwerman	3:50
Total length:				67:38

Have a Nice Day – 2009 reissue (iTunes bonus tracks)
No.	Title	Writer(s)	Producer(s)	Length
18.	"Little Miss Sorrow"		Fredriksson; Gessle; Ilbert; Öfwerman	3:54
19.	"Happy Together"		Gessle; Ilbert; Öfwerman	3:55
20.	"Anyone"/"I Love How You Love Me" (Demo)	Gessle; Barry Mann; Larry Kobler	Gessle	4:09
21.	"New World"	Fredriksson	Boylos	3:37
22.	"Better Off on Her Own" (Demo)		Fredriksson; Gessle	2:49
23.	"Staring at the Ground" (Demo)		Gessle	3:50
24.	"7Twenty7" (Demo)		Gessle	3:25
25.	"It Will Take a Long Long Time" (Modern Rock Version)		Fredriksson; Gessle; Ilbert; Öfwerman	3:57
Total length:				97:14

== Personnel ==
Credits adapted from the liner notes of Have a Nice Day.

- Roxette are Per Gessle and Marie Fredriksson
- Recorded at Tits & Ass Studio in Halmstad; Atlantis Studios, Cosmos Studios and Polar Studios in Stockholm; Studio Vinden in Djursholm, Sweden; El Cortijo Studios in Marbella, Spain between January and October 1998.
- Mastered by George Marino at Sterling Sound Studios, New York City
- Remastered by Alar Suurna at Polar Studios, Stockholm (2009 reissue)

Musicians

- Marie Fredriksson – lead and background vocals, piano, keyboards, production, mixing, sleeve design
- Per Gessle – lead and background vocals, acoustic, electric and wah-wah guitars, harmonica, percussion, programming, engineering, production, mixing, string arrangements, sleeve design
- Micke "Nord" Andersson – acoustic and Rickenbacker guitars
- Michael Ilbert – synthesizers, percussion, programming, engineering, production, mixing, string arrangements
- Jonas Isacsson – acoustic, electric and additional bass guitars
- Christer Jansson – drums and percussion (tom-tom, cymbal, maracas, tambourine, zill and handclaps)
- Christoffer Lundquist – backing vocals, bass guitar, extended-range bass, zither, percussion, tambourine
- Clarence Öfwerman – backing vocals, wah-wah guitar, piano, Hammond and Vox Jaguar organs, glockenspiel, Clavinet, Mellotron, tubular bells, synthesizers, percussion, programming, production, mixing, string arrangements
- Mats "MP" Persson – electric, acoustic and twelve-string guitars, synthesizer, string arrangements
- Stockholms Nya Kammarorkester (credited as SNYKO) – strings

Additional musicians and technical personnel

- Sven Andersson – tenor saxophone (track 4)
- Staffan Astner – acoustic guitar (track 4); electric guitar (tracks 3 and 4)
- Magnus Blom – alto saxophone (track 5)
- Mikael Bolyos – engineering and horn arrangements (track 4)
- Karl-Magnus Boske – sleeve design
- Karla Collantes – choir (track 9)
- Marie Dimberg – management
- Hasse Dyvik – trumpet and flugelhorn (track 5)
- Anders Evaldsson – trombone (track 5)
- Malin Gille – choir (track 9)
- Cecilia Grothén – choir (track 9)
- Lennart Haglund – engineering assistant
- Mats Holmquist – conducting
- Jonas Knutsson – soprano saxophone track 8)
- Jens Lindgård – trombone (track 4)
- Petter Lindgård – trumpet and flugelhorn (track 4)
- George Marino – mastering
- Robert Nettarp – photography
- Paulina Nilsson – choir (track 9)
- Jackie Öfwerman – choir (track 9)
- Staffan Öfwerman – choir director (track 9)
- Darina Rönn-Brolin – choir (track 9)
- DJ Shortcut – scratches (track 3)
- Charlie Storm – programming (track 7)

== Charts ==
=== Weekly charts ===
Chart (1999)	Peak position
Australian Albums (ARIA)	62
Austrian Albums (Ö3 Austria)	3
Belgian Albums (Ultratop Flanders)	1
Belgian Albums (Ultratop Wallonia)	15
Canadian Singles (SoundScan)	2
Danish Albums (Hitlisten)	6
Dutch Albums (Album Top 100)	12
European Albums (Billboard)	2
Finnish Albums (Suomen virallinen lista)	8
German Albums (Offizielle Top 100)	2
Hungarian Albums (MAHASZ)	14
Italian Albums (FIMI)	14
Japanese Albums (Oricon)	19
Norwegian Albums (VG-lista)	6
Scottish Albums (OCC)	36
Spanish Albums (Promúsicae)	2
Swedish Albums (Sverigetopplistan)	1
Swiss Albums (Schweizer Hitparade)	2
UK Albums (OCC)	28

=== Year-end charts ===
Chart (1999)	Position
Austrian Albums (Ö3 Austria)	44
Belgian Albums (Ultratop Flanders)	51
German Albums (GfK)	29
Swedish Albums (Sverigetopplistan)	18
Swiss Albums (Schweizer Hitparade)	43

== Certifications ==
Region	Certification	Certified units/sales
Austria (IFPI Austria)	Gold	25,000^{*}
Finland (Musiikkituottajat)	Platinum	36,952
Germany (BVMI)	Gold	250,000^{^}
Italy (FIMI)	Gold	50,000^{*}
Netherlands (NVPI)	Gold	50,000^{^}
Norway (IFPI Norway)	Platinum	50,000^{*}
Spain (Promusicae)	Platinum	100,000^{^}
Sweden (GLF)	Platinum	80,000^{^}
Switzerland (IFPI Switzerland)	Platinum	50,000^{^}
Summaries
Worldwide		2,200,000
^{*} Sales figures based on certification alone.^{^} Shipments figures based on certification alone.

== Release history ==
Region	Date	Format	Label	Catalog #	Ref.
Japan	17 February 1999	CD; Cassette	Roxette Recordings; Toshiba EMI	TOCP-65156	
Spain	22 February 1999	CD; Cassette	Roxette Recordings; EMI	523309-2 8	
Sweden	22 February 1999	CD; Cassette	Roxette Recordings; EMI	542798-2 9	
Netherlands	22 February 1999	CD; Cassette	Roxette Recordings; EMI	499461-2 5	
Germany	22 February 1999	CD; Cassette	Roxette Recordings; EMI	499461-2 5	
United Kingdom	March 1999	CD; Cassette	Roxette Recordings; EMI	499461-2 5	
Australia	22 March 1999	CD; Cassette	Roxette Recordings; EMI	499461-2 5	
Brazil	9 April 1999	CD; Cassette	Roxette Recordings; EMI	523309-2 8	
Argentina	10 April 1999	CD; Cassette	Roxette Recordings; EMI	523309-2 8	
Mexico	12 April 1999	CD; Cassette	Roxette Recordings; EMI	523309-2 8	
Canada	10 July 1999	CD; Cassette	Roxette Recordings; EMI	498853-2 5	
Worldwide	12 April 2019	2×LP	Roxette Recordings	505419 70004–7 8	
