= Clarence Öfwerman =

Swedish record producer and musician (born 1957)

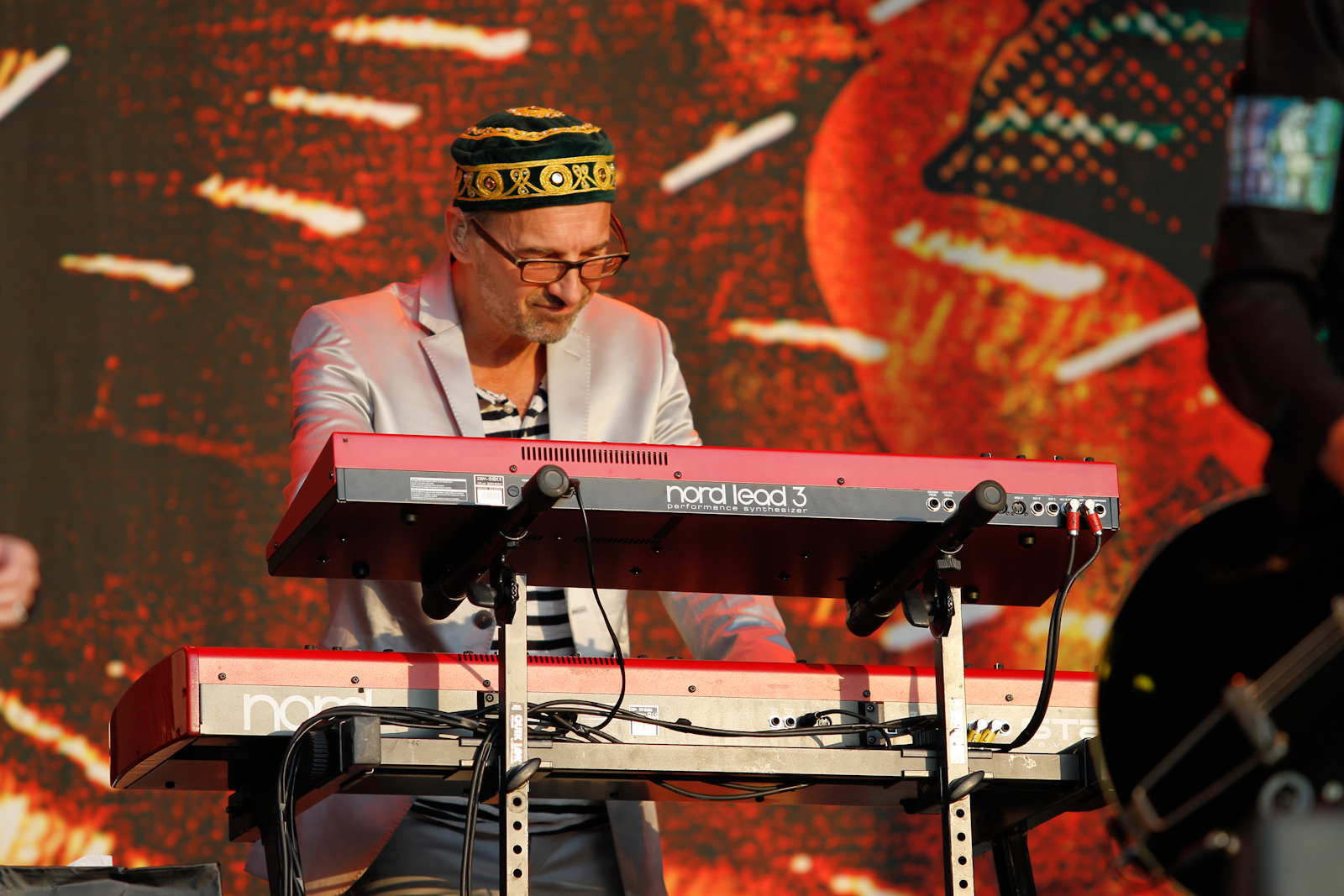
- Öfwerman in 2011

Background information
- Born: 22 November 1957 (age 68)
- Occupation(s): Musician, record producer

Clarence Öfwerman (born 22 November 1957) is a Swedish record producer and musician, best known as the longtime producer of Roxette, having been with the band from their debut album, Pearls of Passion, in 1986, through to 2016's Good Karma, their last studio album. He coproduced Pop-Up Dynamo!, an album issued in 2022 by Per Gessle under the name PG Roxette. He is the older brother of former Roxette percussionist, keyboardist, and backing vocalist Staffan Öfwerman. He also joined Gessle and Roxette as a live musician on various tours, including the 2009 Night of the Proms series in Belgium, the Netherlands, and Germany, as well as a mini European tour in 2010.
