= Live: Travelling the World =

Roxette Live: Travelling the World

Live album by Roxette
- Released: 6 December 2013
- Recorded: 3, 5 & 8 May 2012
- Venues: Orfeo Superdomo, Córdoba; Teatro Caupolicán, Santiago; Teatro Positivo, Curitiba
- Length: 78:48 (physical album); 88:33 (digital album); 156:55 (video)
- Labels: Parlophone; Warner Music
- Director: Mikael Sandberg

Roxette chronology
Travelling (2012)	Roxette Live: Travelling the World (2013)	Roxette XXX – The 30 Biggest Hits (2014)

Roxette Live: Travelling the World is the first and only live album by Swedish pop duo Roxette, released on 6 December 2013 by Parlophone in conjunction with Warner Music. The set consists of recordings derived from three separate performances of the 2012 South American leg of "The Neverending World Tour". The music album contains their 5 May concert at the Teatro Caupolicán in Santiago, Chile in its entirety, while the DVD and Blu-ray also contains songs taken from their performances at the Orfeo Superdomo in Córdoba, Argentina on 3 May and the Teatro Positivo in Curitiba, Brazil on 8 May. Also included on the DVD/Blu-ray is an exclusive documentary, "It All Begins Where It Ends – The Incredible Story of Roxette".

== Critical reception ==
Malaysian newspaper The Star gave the set a positive review, saying that "At 55, Marie Fredriksson may not sound like how she used to anymore", but that longtime fans would be pleased with her "energetic performance ... it's good to know that she hasn't lost her mojo." They praised the performance of "It Must Have Been Love" as the album's best song, saying that Fredriksson "lets the audience sing the song for her before launching into a rocking performance of her own." Swedish publication Aftonbladet was also positive, rating the album three out of five.

== Formats and track listings ==
All songs written by Per Gessle, except "Perfect Day", "Spending My Time" and "Listen to Your Heart" by Gessle and Mats Persson.

CD: Live at Caupolicán, Santiago on 5 May 2012
No.	Title	Length
1.	"Dressed for Success"	4:32
2.	"Sleeping in My Car"	3:45
3.	"The Big L."	4:48
4.	"Silver Blue" (digital bonus track)	4:26
5.	"She's Got Nothing On (But the Radio)"	5:20
6.	"Perfect Day"	4:08
7.	"It Must Have Been Love"	5:38
8.	"It's Possible"	3:14
9.	"7Twenty7"	5:14
10.	"Fading Like a Flower (Every Time You Leave)"	5:02
11.	"Crash! Boom! Bang!"	5:21
12.	"How Do You Do!"	3:07
13.	"Dangerous"	4:33
14.	"Joyride"	4:48
15.	"Spending My Time"	6:20
16.	"The Look"	6:33
17.	"Listen to Your Heart"	6:25
18.	"Church of Your Heart" (digital bonus track)	5:19
Total length:		88:33

DVD/Blu-ray: Roxette Live - Travelling the World
No.	Title	Length
1.	"Dressed for Success"	4:26
2.	"Sleeping in My Car"	3:46
3.	"The Big L."	4:50
4.	"Silver Blue"	4:57
5.	"Stars"	3:30
6.	"She's Got Nothing On (But the Radio)"	4:36
7.	"Perfect Day"	4:32
8.	"Things Will Never Be the Same"	3:27
9.	"It Must Have Been Love"	5:59
10.	"It's Possible"	2:57
11.	"7Twenty7"	5:21
12.	"Fading Like a Flower (Every Time You Leave)"	5:03
13.	"Crash! Boom! Bang!"	5:26
14.	"How Do You Do!"	2:51
15.	"Dangerous"	4:09
16.	"Joyride"	5:09
17.	"Spending My Time"	5:49
18.	"The Look"	7:23
19.	"Listen to Your Heart"	5:39
20.	"Church of Your Heart"	4:32
21.	"It All Begins Where It Ends – The Incredible Story of Roxette" (documentary)	61:42
Total length:		2:36:55

Blu-ray extras
No.	Title	Length
1.	"Gessle Cam Part 1: 'So, Christopher?'"	3:19
2.	"Gessle Cam Part 2: 'Studio Work'"	12:04
3.	"Gessle Cam Part 3: 'Travelling'"	28:48
4.	"Mikael Nogueira-Svensson - The Secret Life of A Guitar Tech"	5:25
Total length:		48:36

== Credits and personnel ==
Credits adapted from the liner notes of Roxette Live: Travelling the World.

- Roxette are Per Gessle and Marie Fredriksson.
- Recorded at Orfeo Superdomo in Córdoba on 3 May 2012, Teatro Caupolicán in Santiago on 5 May 2012, and Teatro Positivo in Curitiba on 8 May 2012.
- All songs mixed by Christoffer Lundquist at The Aerosol Grey Machine.
- Mastered by Mats Lindfors at Cutting Room Studios in Stockholm.

Musicians

- Marie Fredriksson – lead and backing vocals
- Per Gessle – lead and backing vocals, rhythm guitar, harmonica
- Per "Pelle" Alsing – drums and percussion
- Magnus Börjeson – bass and backing vocals
- Dea Norberg – backing vocals and percussion
- Christoffer Lundquist – lead guitar and backing vocals
- Clarence Öfwerman – keyboards and backing vocals

Production

- Justyna Bereza – photography
- Josefin Bolyos – photography
- Kai-Uwe Heinze – photography
- Mattias Holmer – producer (concert film and documentary)
- Svante Larsson – producer (documentary)
- Lucas Lindholm – photography
- Magnus Öhrlund – director and producer (documentary)
- Mikael Sandberg – director (concert film and documentary)

== Charts ==
=== Album charts ===
Chart (2014)	Peak position
Hungarian Albums (MAHASZ)	35

=== Video charts ===
Chart (2013–14)	Peak position
Australian Music DVD Chart	10
Dutch Music DVD Chart	16
Swedish DVD Album Chart	4
