= Roxette XXX – The 30 Biggest Hits =

Greatest hits album by Roxette
- Released: 3 November 2014
- Recorded: 1987–2012
- Genre: Pop
- Label: Roxette Recordings; Parlophone; Warner Music Group
- Producer: Clarence Öfwerman; Per Gessle; Marie Fredriksson; Michael Ilbert; Christoffer Lundquist

Roxette chronology
Live: Travelling the World (2013)	Roxette XXX – The 30 Biggest Hits (2014)	The RoxBox!: A Collection of Roxette's Greatest Songs (2015)

Roxette XXX–The 30 Biggest Hits is the sixth greatest hits compilation album by Swedish pop duo Roxette, released on 3 November 2014 by Roxette Recordings in conjunction with Parlophone and Warner Music Group.

== Release ==
The compilation was released throughout the world in tandem with dates of "The Neverending World Tour". It was first released in Russia on 3 November 2014, the country in which the duo began the "XXX – The 30th Anniversary Tour" leg of "The Neverending World Tour". It was issued in other parts of the world as the tour progressed. The album consists of two CDs containing thirty songs, twenty-eight of which were released as commercial singles. The two remaining tracks were taken from their 1991 album Joyride, "Perfect Day" and "(Do You Get) Excited?". The latter had been issued as a promotional single in selected territories, peaking at number nine on the Spanish Airplay Chart in May 1992. Also included is a Bassflow remix of "The Sweet Hello, The Sad Goodbye", which was released as a non-album single in 2012. The original version of the track first appeared as a b-side on their 1991 single "Spending My Time".

== Track listing ==
All songs written by Per Gessle, except "Spending My Time", "Queen of Rain", "Perfect Day", "Listen to Your Heart" and "(Do You Get) Excited?" by Gessle and Mats Persson, and "You Don't Understand Me" by Gessle and Desmond Child; all songs produced by Clarence Öfwerman, except where noted.

Roxette XXX – The 30 Biggest Hits – Disc 1
No.	Title	Producer(s)	Length
1.	"The Look" (from Look Sharp!, 1988)		3:57
2.	"Dressed for Success" (US Single Mix) (from Look Sharp!)		4:13
3.	"Dangerous" (2003 Remastered Version) (from Look Sharp!)		3:48
4.	"It Must Have Been Love" (from Pretty Woman: Original Motion Picture Soundtrack, 1990)		4:18
5.	"How Do You Do!" (from Tourism, 1992)		3:09
6.	"Wish I Could Fly" (from Have a Nice Day, 1999)	Marie Fredriksson; Gessle; Michael Ilbert; Öfwerman	4:40
7.	"Spending My Time" (from Joyride, 1991)		4:48
8.	"Almost Unreal" (from Super Mario Bros.: Original Motion Picture Soundtrack, 1993)		3:54
9.	"The Big L." (from Joyride)		4:25
10.	"Fading Like a Flower (Every Time You Leave)" (from Joyride)		3:50
11.	"Crash! Boom! Bang!" (Radio Edit) (from Crash! Boom! Bang!, 1994)		4:26
12.	"June Afternoon" (from Don't Bore Us, Get to the Chorus!, 1995)		4:11
13.	"Queen of Rain" (from Tourism)		4:55
14.	"Opportunity Nox" (from The Pop Hits, 2003)	Öfwerman; Gessle; Fredriksson	2:58
15.	"Perfect Day" (from Joyride)		4:04

Roxette XXX – The 30 Biggest Hits – Disc 2
No.	Title	Producer(s)	Length
1.	"Joyride" (Single Version) (from Joyride)		4:01
2.	"Sleeping in My Car" (Single Version) (from Crash! Boom! Bang!)		3:34
3.	"Listen to Your Heart" (Swedish Single Edit) (from Look Sharp!)		5:14
4.	"Run to You" (2003 Remastered Version) (from Crash! Boom! Bang!)		3:38
5.	"Real Sugar" (2003 Remastered Version) (from Room Service, 2001)	Öfwerman; Gessle; Fredriksson	3:14
6.	"Milk and Toast and Honey" (Single Master) (from Room Service)	Öfwerman; Gessle; Fredriksson	4:04
7.	"Stars" (2003 Remastered Version) (from Have a Nice Day)	Fredriksson; Gessle; Ilbert; Öfwerman	3:48
8.	"Vulnerable" (from Crash! Boom! Bang!)		5:00
9.	"The Centre of the Heart" (2003 Remastered Version) (from Room Service)	Öfwerman; Gessle; Fredriksson; Ilbert^{[a]}	3:23
10.	"A Thing About You" (from The Ballad Hits, 2002)	Öfwerman; Gessle	3:46
11.	"Anyone" (from Have a Nice Day)	Fredriksson; Gessle; Ilbert; Öfwerman	4:31
12.	"You Don't Understand Me" (from Don't Bore Us, Get to the Chorus!)		4:28
13.	"She's Got Nothing On (But the Radio)" (from Charm School, 2011)	Öfwerman; Gessle; Christoffer Lundquist	3:34
14.	"(Do You Get) Excited?" (from Joyride)		4:15
15.	"The Sweet Hello, The Sad Goodbye" (Bassflow Remake) (non-album single, 2012)	Öfwerman; Gessle; Lundquist; Peter Boström^{[b]}	4:48

Notes

- ^{^a} signifies backing track co-production
- ^{^b} signifies remix and additional production

== Personnel ==
Credits adapted from the liner notes of Roxette XXX – The 30 Biggest Hits.

- Roxette are Marie Fredriksson and Per Gessle
- Recorded at Tits & Ass Studio in Halmstad; X-Level Studios, Polar Studios, Audio Sweden and Atlantis Studios in Stockholm; The Aerosol Grey Machine in Vallarum, Scania; Mayfair Studios in London; El Cortijo Studios in Marbella, Spain; Capri Digital Studios in Capri, Italy between November 1987 and October 2010; "The Sweet Hello, The Sad Goodbye" reproduced and remixed at The Aerosol Grey Machine in Vallarum and Atlantis Studios in Stockholm in 2012.
- Compiled by Per Gessle.
- Mastered by Uffe Börjesson at Ear Hear Studio.

Musicians

- Marie Fredriksson – lead and background vocals; piano ("Stars"); production and mixing
- Per Gessle – lead and background vocals; acoustic guitar ("Wish I Could Fly", "June Afternoon", "Opportunity Nox", "Run to You", "Real Sugar" and "A Thing About You"); electric guitar ("June Afternoon", "Opportunity Nox", "Sleeping in My Car", "Real Sugar" and "The Centre of the Heart"); kazoo ("June Afternoon"); string arrangements ("Wish I Could Fly"); whistling ("Joyride"); twelve-string acoustic guitar ("Milk and Toast and Honey"); production and mixing
- Per "Pelle" Alsing – drums and hi-hat
- Micke "Nord" Andersson – twelve string acoustic and Rickenbacker guitars ("Wish I Could Fly"); drums and tambourine ("June Afternoon"); acoustic guitar ("Stars")
- Vicki Benckert – background vocals ("How Do You Do!" and "Almost Unreal")
- Anders Herrlin – background vocals, bass guitar, engineering and programming
- Jonas Isacsson – electric and acoustic guitars; additional bass guitar ("Wish I Could Fly"); harmonica ("The Big L.")
- Christer Jansson – tom-toms and cymbals ("Wish I Could Fly"); percussion ("Crash! Boom! Bang!" and "The Centre of the Heart"); cymbals ("Milk and Toast and Honey"); drums ("You Don't Understand Me"); drums, percussion and tambourine ("Anyone")
- Christoffer Lundquist – background vocals and extended-range bass ("Wish I Could Fly"); bass and electric guitars ("Opportunity Nox" and "Real Sugar"); background vocals ("Milk and Toast and Honey" and "Stars"); background vocals and bass ("A Thing About You"); background vocals, bass, zither, tambourine and additional snare drum ("Anyone"); bass, guitars, keyboards, programming, engineering, production and mixing ("She's Got Nothing On (But the Radio)")
- Clarence Öfwerman – background vocals, keyboards, Synclavier ("It Must Have Been Love"); string arrangements ("Wish I Could Fly", "June Afternoon", "Run to You", "Vulnerable" and "Anyone"); programming, production and mixing
- Staffan Öfwerman – percussion ("How Do You Do!"); background vocals ("How Do You Do!", "Almost Unreal", "Fading Like a Flower", "The Big L." and "Sleeping in My Car"); choir conducting ("Stars")
- Mats "MP" Persson – engineering ("How Do You Do!" and "A Thing About You"); string arrangements ("Wish I Could Fly"); electric and acoustic guitars ("June Afternoon"); drums ("Sleeping in My Car"); keyboards and tremolo guitar ("Real Sugar"); electric guitar ("Milk and Toast and Honey")
- Stockholm Session Strings – strings ("Milk and Toast and Honey" and "The Centre of the Heart")
- Stockholms Nya Kammarorkester (credited as SNYKO) – strings ("Wish I Could Fly", "Crash! Boom! Bang!", "Run to You" and "Anyone")
- Alar Suurna – tambourine ("Sleeping in My Car"); engineering and mixing

Additional musicians

- Milla Andersson – background vocals ("A Thing About You")
- Magnus Blom – alto saxophone ("Anyone")
- Karla Collantes – choir ("Stars")
- Hasse Dyvik – trumpet and flugelhorn ("Anyone")
- Bo Eriksson – oboe ("Queen of Rain")
- Anders Evaldsson – trombone ("Anyone")
- Malin Gille – choir ("Stars")
- Cecilia Grothén – choir ("Stars")
- Henrik Janson – talkbox ("Dangerous")
- Jarl "Jalle" Lorensson – harmonica ("Dangerous")
- Paulina Nilsson – choir ("Stars")
- Jackie Öfwerman – choir ("Stars")
- Kjell Öhman – accordion ("Perfect Day")
- Jan "Janne" Oldaeus – slide guitar ("Dangerous")
- Darina Rönn-Brolin – choir ("Stars")
- Per "Pelle" Sirén – electric guitar ("Sleeping in My Car")
- Sveriges Radios Symfoniorkester – woodwind quartet ("June Afternoon")

Technical

- Chris Lord-Alge – mixing ("Dressed for Success")
- Humberto Gatica – mixing ("It Must Have Been Love")
- Lennart Haglund – engineer ("Queen of Rain" and "She's Got Nothing On (But the Radio)")
- Mats Holmquist – string arrangements & conducting ("Crash! Boom! Bang!", "June Afternoon", "Run to You", "Milk and Toast and Honey", "Vulnerable", "The Centre of the Heart" and "Anyone")
- Michael Ilbert – engineering, programming, string arrangements, production and mixing ("Wish I Could Fly"); engineering ("June Afternoon" and "You Don't Understand Me"); engineering, production and mixing ("Stars" and "Anyone")
- Ronny Lahti – engineering, programming and mixing ("Opportunity Nox", "Real Sugar", "Milk and Toast and Honey", "The Centre of the Heart" and "A Thing About You")
- Björn Norén – strings and horns recording engineer ("June Afternoon")
- Shooting Star – programming ("Opportunity Nox", "Real Sugar", "Milk and Toast and Honey", "The Centre of the Heart" and "A Thing About You")

== Charts ==
Chart (2015–19)	Peak position
Australian Albums (ARIA)	27
Austrian Albums (Ö3 Austria)	49
Belgian Albums (Ultratop Flanders)	55
Belgian Albums (Ultratop Wallonia)	156
Czech Albums (ČNS IFPI)	8
Dutch Albums (Album Top 100)	95
German Albums (Offizielle Top 100)	14
Greek Albums (IFPI)	50
Hungarian Albums (MAHASZ)	8
Irish Albums (IRMA)	87
New Zealand Albums (RMNZ)	38
Polish Albums (ZPAV)	18
Portuguese Albums (AFP)	42
Scottish Albums (OCC)	65
Spanish Albums (PROMUSICAE)	45
Swedish Albums (Sverigetopplistan)	46
Swiss Albums (Schweizer Hitparade)	11
UK Album Downloads (OCC)	22

== Certifications ==
Region	Certification	Certified units/sales
New Zealand (RMNZ)	Gold	7,500^{‡}
United Kingdom (BPI)	Gold	100,000^{‡}
^{‡} Sales+streaming figures based on certification alone.

== Release history ==
Region	Date	Format	Label	Catalog #	Ref.
Russia	3 November 2014	CD; digital download	Roxette Recordings; Parlophone; Warner Music Group	50541 964160 2–7	
Europe	9 February 2015	CD; digital download	Roxette Recordings; Parlophone; Warner Music Group	50541 964160 5–8	
Australia and New Zealand	27 February 2015	CD; digital download	Roxette Recordings; Parlophone; Warner Music Group	50541 964160 5–8	
South Africa	2 March 2015	CD; digital download	Roxette Recordings; Parlophone; Warner Music Group	CDESP–431	
Worldwide	4 March 2015	CD; digital download	Roxette Recordings; Parlophone; Warner Music Group	50541 964160 5–8	
Japan	15 May 2015	CD; digital download	Roxette Recordings; Parlophone	WPCR–16434	
