= It's Possible =

Single by Roxette

from the album Travelling
- Released: 16 March 2012
- Studio: Tits & Ass, Halmstad; The Aerosol Grey Machine, Vallarum; Atlantis, Stockholm
- Genre: Pop rock
- Length: 2:36
- Label: Roxette Recordings; Capitol
- Songwriter(s): Per Gessle
- Producer(s): Christoffer Lundquist; Clarence Öfwerman; Gessle

Roxette singles chronology
"Way Out" (2011)	"It's Possible" (2012)	"The Sweet Hello, The Sad Goodbye" (2012)

Music video
- "It's Possible" on YouTube

"It's Possible" is a song by Swedish pop music duo Roxette, released on 16 March 2012 as the lead single from their ninth studio album, Travelling. Two versions of the track appeared on the album; "Version One" was released as the single. The song was written by Per Gessle, and its music video was directed by David Nord and Boris Nawratil. It was not as commercially successful as the duo's preceding lead singles, appearing on several airplay charts but failing to appear on any national sales charts with the exception of the German Singles Chart, where it peaked at number 64. As of 2018, it remains the band's final song to chart in that country.

== Composition and style ==
Two versions of the song appear on parent album Travelling: "Version One" was released as a single, and features synthesizer, electric guitar, and processed vocal effects; "Version Two" features acoustic guitar and live drums. The first version has a duration of two minutes and 36 seconds, while the second version lasts 8 seconds longer. The track was written by Per Gessle, who described the difference between the two recordings: "The first version we did in sort of a "She's Got Nothing On (But the Radio)" style, pretty hard with similar guitars. But then, it [was written] as kind of a soft song, so I thought we should do like a summer style". He went on to compare the second version to the work of his previous band Gyllene Tider – specifically "Hjärta utan hem" from 2004's Finn 5 fel! – and said "We took that kind of arrangement and it works really well, [the second version has] more like a sixties feel to it. We couldn't decide which one we preferred, so we actually used both." Stefan Weber of Monsters and Critics contrasted the two versions, calling the first a "stale Erasure copy", and the second a "beautiful and timeless pop number. ... And if you had to give Roxette a hint for continued success, then it's this: please focus on the songs and the harmonious vocals—and not on the over-produced studio sound."

Both versions of the song have an allegro-ranged tempo of 122 beats per minute. According to Ultimate Guitar, the introduction and verses each consist of a B–F♯–E–B–F♯–E–B sequence, and the chorus is made up of two repetitions of E♭m–B–F♯–C♯, and ends with an extended sequence of E–F–F♯–F–F♯–F–F♯. The bridge is composed of E♭m–F♯–C♯–G♭m–E♭m–F♯–C♯–B, followed by a brief interlude consisting of two repetitions of a B–F♯–E–B–F♯–E–B sequence.

== Release and promotion ==
A two-track CD single featuring a demo version of the song as a b-side was released on 16 March. The music video to "It's Possible" was directed by David Nord and Boris Nawratil, and uploaded onto Vimeo on 3 April. It consists of behind-the-scenes footage of Marie Fredriksson and Per Gessle during photography sessions for the Travelling artwork, and contains computer-generated imagery created by Jonas Dahlbäck of the band travelling on an airplane. A 12-track promotional EP – containing previously released singles, live recordings and remixes – was released exclusively in Oriflame outlets throughout Russia and Ukraine at the beginning of June 2012.

== Commercial performance ==
"It's Possible" was not as commercially successful as the duo's preceding lead singles. In the United Kingdom, it was named BBC Radio 2's 'Record of the Week' for the week commencing 17 March, and was A-listed by the station on 22 March. It debuted at number 65 on the UK Airplay Chart on 18 March, before rising to number 33 the following week, with a total of 29 plays and an audience impression of over 21 million. It was also successful in Russia. Despite peaking at a relatively low 163 on the TopHit airplay chart, the song has been played over 6,000 times on Russian radio. The track peaked at number 64 and spent a sole week on the German Singles Chart, becoming Roxette's 34th and, as of 2018, final single to chart in Germany. The song failed to appear on any other international sales charts.

== Formats and track listings ==
All songs written by Per Gessle, except "Listen to Your Heart" by Gessle and Mats "MP" Persson.

- Digital download (79246–08)
1. "It's Possible" (Version One) (Radio Edit) – 2:36
- CD single (50999 463857–2 7)
1. "It's Possible" (Version One) (Radio Edit) – 2:36
2. "It's Possible" (Tits & Ass Demo, 26 July 2011) – 2:33
- Promotional CD single
1. "It's Possible" (Version One) – 2:36
2. "It's Possible" (Version Two) – 2:44
3. "It's Possible" (Tits & Ass Demo, 26 July 2011) – 2:33
- Oriflame EP (50999 463313–2 8)
1. "It's Possible" (Version One) – 2:36
2. "It Must Have Been Love" (Live at the Saint Petersburg Ice Palace on 12 September 2010) – 6:01
3. "Wish I Could Fly" – 4:42
4. "How Do You Do!" (Live at Vistestranden in Stavanger on 21 August 2010) – 2:35
5. "Dangerous" (Live at Vistestranden in Stavanger on 21 August 2010) – 4:11
6. "Reveal" (The Attic Remix) – 3:29
7. "Speak to Me" (Bassflow Remix) – 3:35
8. "Dressed for Success" (Live at the Saint Petersburg Ice Palace on 12 September 2010) – 4:35
9. "Sleeping in My Car" (Live at Vistestranden in Stavanger on 21 August 2010) – 3:42
10. "Milk and Toast and Honey" – 4:05
11. "Real Sugar" – 3:17
12. "Listen to Your Heart" (Live at the Saint Petersburg Ice Palace on 12 September 2010) – 5:45

== Personnel ==
Credits adapted from the liner notes of Travelling.

- Demo version recorded at Tits & Ass Studio in Halmstad, Sweden on 26 July 2011
- Album version recorded at The Aerosol Grey Machine in Vallarum, Scania and Atlantis Studios in Stockholm

Musicians

- Marie Fredriksson — lead and background vocals
- Per Gessle — lead and background vocals, production
- Björn Engelmann — mastering (at Cutting Room Studios, Stockholm)
- Christoffer Lundquist — keyboards, programming, engineering, production and mixing
- Clarence Öfwerman — keyboards, programming and production
- Mats "M.P." Persson — engineering (demo version only)

== Charts ==
Chart (2012)	Peak position
Germany (GfK)	64
Russian Airplay (TopHit)	163
UK Airplay (OCC)	33
