= The Sweet Hello, The Sad Goodbye =

1991 song by Roxette

"The Sweet Hello, The Sad Goodbye" is a song by Swedish pop duo Roxette, written by Per Gessle and recorded in the spring of 1990 for their third studio album Joyride. However, the song was excluded from the album, and was instead recorded by former Modern Talking vocalist Thomas Anders, who in April 1991 issued his version as the lead single from his solo album Whispers. Six months later, Roxette released their original recording as a limited edition promotional single exclusively in Sweden. In 1993, a version produced by Phil Ramone was recorded by American singer Laura Branigan for her seventh studio album, Over My Heart. The same year, Phil Thornalley produced a version for Jason Donovan, which was included as a b-side to his single "All Around the World" and later included on the expanded edition of his album of the same name.

Roxette included their original version as a b-side on the "Spending My Time" (1991) and "Vulnerable" (1995) singles, as well as their 1995 compilation Rarities. It also appeared on The Rox Box/Roxette 86–06 (2006). In 2012, a remix of the song created by Peter Boström was released as a non-album single. This remix went on to appear on Roxette XXX – The 30 Biggest Hits (2014) and The RoxBox!: A Collection of Roxette's Greatest Songs (2015).

== Composition and style ==
In his 2014 book Songs, Sketches & Reflections: The English Part, Per Gessle said of the track: "I wrote this for Roxette's Joyride LP in the spring of 1990 and we recorded it properly, but didn't use it. I can't remember why. Marie's voice is certainly incredible here." The original Roxette recording is a pop song with an andante moderato tempo of 95 beats per minute. Each verse is made up of an A♭–E–C♯–B–F♯ sequence, followed by a bridge consisting of B–F♯–A♭–B–F♯. The first two choruses are made up of three repetitions of C♯–B–F♯ and a sequence of E–f♯–A♭. The second chorus is followed by a piano solo of C♯–B–F♯–F♯–D–A–E–F♯–D–A–E. The final chorus modulates upwards by two octaves, and is made up of 3 sequences of an Em–D–A sequence followed by G–A–Bm–G–A–Em.

== Release and other versions ==
The song was recorded by a number of artists in the early 1990s. Modern Talking vocalist Thomas Anders recorded a version of the track, which was issued in April 1991 as the lead single from his second solo album, Whispers. In October of the same year, Roxette first released their version as a limited edition promotional single. Only 225 copies of this single were created, all of which were sent to Swedish radio stations as a gift to thank them for their support throughout the years. The following month, the song appeared as the b-side to their commercial single "Spending My Time".

In 1993, American singer Laura Branigan recorded the song for her seventh and final studio album, Over My Heart. Her version was produced by Phil Ramone. According to Gessle, Branigan also requested to record a version of "Queen of Rain" for the album, but this was denied, as Gessle wanted to keep "that one for ourselves." Also in 1993, Jason Donovan released the track as a b-side to his single "All Around the World". His version was re-titled "Sweet Hello, Sad Goodbye", and was incorrectly attributed as being written by Per Gessler. "Sweet Hello, Sad Goodbye" was produced by Phil Thornalley, who would later find success co-writing and producing the Natalie Imbruglia track "Torn". Donovan's "All Around the World" peaked at number 41 on the UK Singles Chart; his final single to appear on the chart. His version of the track was later included on The Polydor Edition of his third album, also called "All Around The World".

== Bassflow remake (2012) ==
"The Sweet Hello, The Sad Goodbye"
- Cover art for the "Bassflow Remake"

Single by Roxette
- Released: 26 June 2012
- Length: 3:47
- Label: Roxette Recordings; Capitol
- Songwriter: Per Gessle
- Producers: Gessle; Clarence Öfwerman; Christoffer Lundquist; Peter Boström

Roxette singles chronology
"It's Possible" (2012)	"The Sweet Hello, The Sad Goodbye" (2012)	"The Look (2015 Remake)" (2015)

Roxette released a remixed version of the track – created by Peter Boström, known professionally as Bassflow – as a non-album single on 26 June 2012. Boström had previously produced the single version of their 2011 track "Speak to Me". His remix of "The Sweet Hello, The Sad Goodbye" was originally scheduled to appear on their 2012 album Travelling, but was not completed in time. Production was delayed due to Boström's involvement with Loreen's "Euphoria", which won the 2012 Eurovision Song Contest. The Bassflow version appears on Roxette XXX – The 30 Biggest Hits (2014) and The RoxBox!: A Collection of Roxette's Greatest Songs (2015).

=== Commercial performance ===
Despite peaking at a relatively low position on the Russian Airplay Chart, the song has been broadcast on Russian radio almost 14,000 times.

=== Critical reception ===
Scandipop said "Bassflow turns in another winning production on 'The Sweet Hello, The Sad Goodbye'. Atmospheric balladry is definitely one of his party pieces, and he instantly elevates this song into the same standard of some of Roxette's very own great atmospheric ballads of the past – this is definitely up there with 'Wish I Could Fly', for example."

=== Formats and track listings ===
Digital download

1. "The Sweet Hello, The Sad Goodbye" (Bassflow Remake) (Radio Edit) – 3:47
2. "The Sweet Hello, The Sad Goodbye" (Bassflow Remake) (Main Version) – 4:48
- Blue 10" vinyl single (EU: 5 09999 73619–7 8)
1. "The Sweet Hello, The Sad Goodbye" (Bassflow Remake) (Main Version) – 4:48
2. "The Sweet Hello, The Sad Goodbye" (Bassflow Remake) (Radio Edit) – 3:47
3. "The Sweet Hello, The Sad Goodbye" (Original Version) – 4:49
4. "The Sweet Hello, The Sad Goodbye" (Tits & Ass Demo Version) – 4:41

=== Charts ===
Chart (2012)	Peak position
Swedish Airplay (Svensktoppen)	10
Russian Airplay (TopHit)	166
