= Way Out (Roxette song) =

Single by Roxette

from the album Charm School
- Released: 10 June 2011
- Recorded: January–October 2010
- Studio: Tits & Ass Studio, Halmstad; The Aerosol Grey Machine, Vallarum; Atlantis, Stockholm
- Genre: Pop rock
- Length: 2:46
- Label: Roxette Recordings; Capitol
- Songwriter(s): Per Gessle
- Producer(s): Christoffer Lundquist; Clarence Öfwerman; Gessle

Roxette singles chronology
| "Speak to Me" (2011) | "Way Out" (2011) | "It's Possible" (2012) |

Music video
- "Way Out" on YouTube

"Way Out" is a song by Swedish pop music duo Roxette, released on 10 June 2011 as the third and final commercial single from their eighth studio album, Charm School. The single was released solely in Germany and Austria, with their record label there opting to release another uptempo single, following the success of "She's Got Nothing On (But the Radio)". Elsewhere, a Bassflow remix of "Speak to Me" was released as the album's final commercial single. The song received generally positive reviews, and its music video was directed by Mikael Sandberg and Magnus Öhrlund.

== Composition and style ==
"Way Out" was written by Per Gessle, and first released as the opening track on 2011's Charm School—Roxette's first studio album since 2001's Room Service. It is an uptempo pop rock song, which runs for a duration of two minutes and 46 seconds. It was produced by Gessle alongside Christoffer Lundquist and Clarence Öfwerman. According to Ultimate Guitar, the song has a tempo of 170 beats per minute. Each verse is composed of four repetitions of a G–D–C sequence, followed by a chorus consisting of two repetitions of Em–C–G–D, while the bridge is made up of three progressions of Am–C–Em–D.

Chris Roberts from BBC Music described the song as a "sonic sibling to Joan Jett's 'I Love Rock 'n' Roll', only even bigger, louder and dumber", and said it was indicative of the quality of the album, which he said was "loaded with punchy, hook-riddled anthems that can only be described as absolute belters." The song features a distinctive introduction, performed on a mouth harp. Gessle described it as an obvious album opener, and said: "We needed a cool intro, and we had fun thinking about what [we could use]. We joked about having the sound of a cat giving birth, or a dying cat, or something stupid like that. Then someone suggested a mouth harp. It sounded really weird, so we went with that. It felt like a nice comeback for Roxette: the first sound you hear from us after ten years is a mouth harp."

== Release and promotion ==
The song was released as a single on 10 June 2011, solely in Germany and Austria. Due to the success of "She's Got Nothing On (But the Radio)", EMI Germany opted to release another uptempo song as the second single from the album in that country. A Bassflow remix of "Speak to Me" had been released as the second single from Charm School internationally. A music video was also created for "Way Out". It premiered on MyVideo on 10 June, followed by its worldwide premiere two days later on the website of Swedish publication Aftonbladet. The video was directed by Mikael Sandberg and Magnus Öhrlund, and produced by Mattias Holmer. It consisted of footage of the band travelling and performing the song during a soundcheck, and features behind-the-stage footage from 2011 dates of "The Neverending World Tour".

== Formats and track listings ==
All songs written by Per Gessle.

- CD single (50999 082500–2 5)
1. "Way Out" – 2:46
2. "Crash! Boom! Bang!" / "Anyone" (Live at Forest National in Brussels, Belgium on 22 October 2001) – 6:21

== Personnel ==
Credits adapted from the liner notes of Charm School Revisited.

- Demo recorded at Tits & Ass Studio in Halmstad, Sweden on 25 January 2010
- Backing track and Per Gessle's vocals recorded at The Aerosol Grey Machine in Vallarum, Sweden in February 2010
- Marie Fredriksson's vocals recorded at Atlantis Studio in Stockholm, Sweden in October 2010

Musicians

- Marie Fredriksson – background vocals
- Per Gessle – lead and background vocals, guitars, mouth harp, production
- Tom Coyne – mastering (at Sterling Sound Studios, New York City)
- Jens Jansson – drums
- Ronny Lahti – mixing
- Christoffer Lundquist – bass guitar, guitars, keyboards, programming, engineering and production
- Clarence Öfwerman – keyboards, programming and production
- Mats "M.P." Persson – demo recording engineer

== Charts ==
| Chart (2011) | Peak position |
|---|---|
| Russian Airplay (TopHit) | 197 |
