= Travelling (Roxette album) =

Travelling: Songs from Studios, Stages, Hotel Rooms and Other Strange Places

Studio album with live tracks by Roxette
- Released: 23 March 2012
- Recorded: 1993–2011
- Studios: Tits & Ass, Halmstad; Aerosol Grey Machine, Scania; Atlantis, Polar and EMI Studios, Stockholm; Capri Digital, Capri; Hotel rooms in Cape Town and Sun City; Dubai World Trade Centre, Dubai; Citibank Hall, Rio de Janeiro; Rotterdam Ahoy, Rotterdam
- Genre: Pop rock
- Length: 54:36
- Labels: Roxette Recordings; Capitol
- Producers: Christoffer Lundquist; Clarence Öfwerman; Per Gessle; Marie Fredriksson (track 11 only)

Roxette chronology
Charm School (2011)	Travelling: Songs from Studios, Stages, Hotel Rooms and Other Strange Places (2012)	Live: Travelling the World (2013)

Singles from Travelling
- 1. "It's Possible" Released: 16 March 2012

Travelling: Songs from Studios, Stages, Hotel Rooms and Other Strange Places is the ninth studio album by Swedish pop duo Roxette, released on 23 March 2012 by Roxette Recordings and Capitol. It is a direct sequel to their 1992 album Tourism. Unlike that album, which was recorded in numerous locations all over the world during the "Join the Joyride! Tour", Travelling was primarily recorded in Swedish studios in-between legs of "The Neverending World Tour". The album also contains three live recordings and four studio re-recordings of older songs, two of which were previously unreleased.

Vocalist Marie Fredriksson was more involved in the production of the album than she had been on its predecessor, 2011's Charm School, which songwriter Per Gessle credited to the band's extensive touring schedule. "It's Possible" was released as the album's first and only commercial single on 16 March, although "Touched by the Hand of God" and "Lover, Lover, Lover" were issued as promotional and airplay-only singles, respectively. The release of the former song as a commercial single was cancelled when a Bassflow remix of "The Sweet Hello, The Sad Goodbye" – an outtake from their 1991 album Joyride – was released as a single on 26 June.

The album was a critical success upon release, with several reviewers commending the quality of Gessle's songwriting and describing it as a better record than its predecessor. Despite this, it was not as successful commercially as their other studio albums, peaking at career-low chart positions on several national record charts, including in Austria, Switzerland and the duo's home country, where the album received its only known certification, from the Swedish Recording Industry Association.

== Background and recording ==
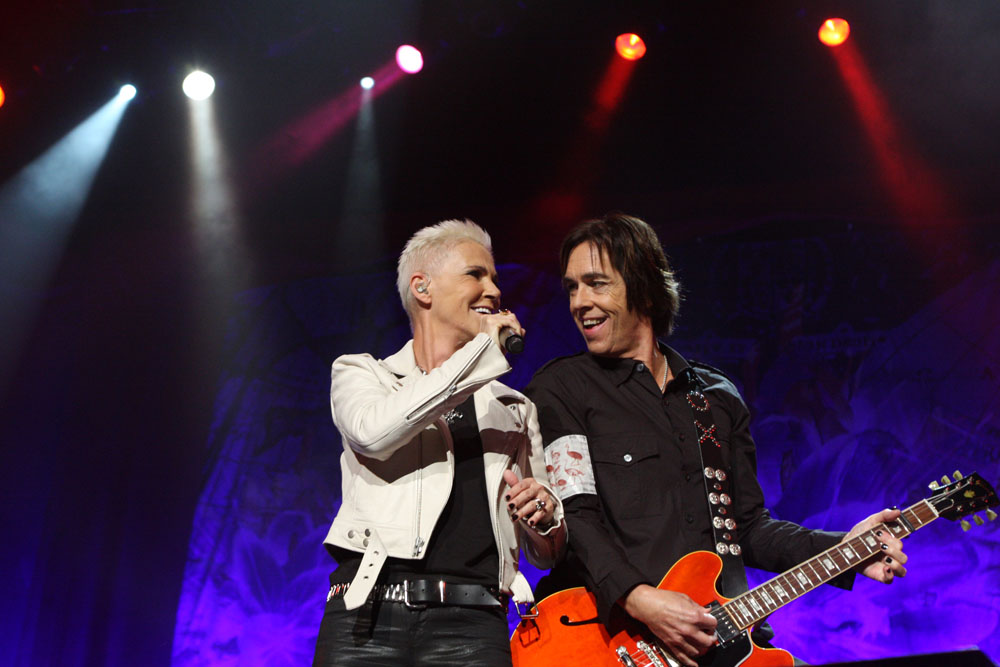
Marie Fredriksson and Per Gessle performing at the Sydney Entertainment Centre on 17 February 2012.

Travelling is a direct sequel to Roxette's 1992 album Tourism. The duo's main songwriter Per Gessle explained: "It's the same idea as we used on Tourism back in 1992, which was to record an album on the road—to capture the positive energy [of a live band. Travelling is] not a record that is written or produced to top the charts. We didn't think 'Let's have three singles on this one'. It's just got a great vibe, from start to finish." Unlike Tourism, which consisted of songs recorded in numerous studios, stadiums, arenas, nightclubs and hotels all over the world during the "Join the Joyride! Tour", Travelling was primarily recorded in Sweden in-between legs of "The Neverending World Tour", with the exception of four tracks.

The album contains three live recordings: a version of "Stars" performed during a soundcheck at the Dubai World Trade Centre on 20 May 2011, "She's Got Nothing On (But the Radio)" recorded live at Citibank Hall in Rio de Janeiro on 16 April 2011, and an orchestral performance of "It Must Have Been Love" from their Night of the Proms set at the Rotterdam Ahoy in November 2009. "Turn of the Tide" was recorded in hotel rooms in Sun City and Cape Town. The song was first demoed in September 1997 during sessions for their 1999 album Have a Nice Day, while "The Weight of the World" had previously appeared as a b-side to "A Thing About You" in 2002. "Touched By the Hand of God" was formerly the title track to Charm School. (Note: "This was the title track of Roxette's Charm School album but it never made the record. I wrote it in September 2009 and it felt really good, but the Roxette version didn't come out right. So we partly re-recorded it for the Travelling album with a different production angle. I gave it a new title ["Touched By the Hand of God"] and it became a single. I've said it before and I say it again: songs move in mysterious ways..." — Gessle, Songs, Sketches & Reflections: The English Part.) Vocalist Marie Fredriksson described the latter as her favourite song on the album.

Fredriksson was more involved in the production of Travelling than she had been on 2011's Charm School—the duo's first studio album since she was diagnosed with a brain tumour in 2002. Gessle said: "Marie was away for such a long time that when we did Charm School, nobody knew at the time what capacity she [could] actually [be involved]. But the more the touring went on, the better that she became and it just feels that there are certain songs on Travelling that she's just so much more into. It just felt right [this time]." The album contains a new recording of "See Me", a track which Fredriksson composed in 1993 during sessions for Crash! Boom! Bang! (1994) that was later released as a b-side to their 1999 single "Salvation". Travelling also contains a new version of "Perfect Excuse", a track from Gessle's 2008 solo album Party Crasher which initially featured vocals from Helena Josefsson. This new version features vocals from both Fredriksson and Josefsson.

The record was originally named Tourism 2, although the title went through several revisions before release – including 2rism and T2 − on the insistence of their record label. Gessle said: "It was actually our record company which didn't like the idea, because they said people are gonna get confused and they'll mix it up with Tourism number one. Personally, I didn't get that. So then we said, 'OK, how about T2?'. But they said no because a title with a number wasn't good, and I asked 'What about Adele's 21?' They didn't answer that one." Gessle chose Travelling as its new title, "instead of having these quarrels all the time ... But we kept the same [Tourism] subtitle: Songs from Studios, Stages, Hotelrooms & Other Strange Places."

== Release and promotion ==
Travelling was preceded by lead single "It's Possible" on 16 March 2012. The track performed well in the United Kingdom, where BBC Radio 2 named it their 'Record of the Week'. Its music video was released on 3 April, and was directed by David Nord and Boris Nawratil. "Touched By the Hand of God" was issued as a promotional single in Europe from the beginning of June. However, its planned release as a commercial single was cancelled; a Bassflow remix of "The Sweet Hello, The Sad Goodbye" – an outtake from their 1991 album Joyride – was released as a single on 26 June. "Lover, Lover, Lover" was released as a promotional single in Germany in September.

== Critical reception ==
Professional ratings
Review scores
Source	Rating
Aftonbladet	3.5/5 stars
AllMusic	4/5 stars
Dagens Nyheter	(2/4)
Gaffa	3/6 stars
Hallandsposten	3/5 stars
Laut.de	2/5 stars
Nerikes Allehanda	2/5 stars
Spin	(8/10)
Svenska Dagbladet	4/5 stars
Sydsvenskan	(3/5)

The album received generally positive reviews, with several publications praising the quality of Gessle's songwriting, such as Svenska Dagbladet which said that his "love for pop history shines through". Anders Gustafsson of Dalarnas Tidningar wrote: "Charm School was an incredibly charmless piece of plastic. ... [but] the cramp seems to have been released [on Travelling]. Anyone who expected a similarly hopeless, dated-sounding album should hang their heads in shame. The sound is not as muddy as it was last time, but above all else, the songs are so much better." Anders Jaderup of Sydsvenskan also complimented the production: "It's a way of working that obviously suits the band, and that's the point—Roxette sounds like a band again; like a passionate group of musicians, not – as on last year's sad Charm School – a carefully-calculated studio product." He described "Excuse Me, Sir, Do You Want Me to Check on Your Wife?" as an album highlight, saying it has "something very unusual for Roxette: a lyric with a story to tell." Gaffa commended the inclusion of country and folk influences, and said: "Something happens to Per Gessle when he works with Marie Fredriksson. He lifts higher than he does on his own. The music reproduces almost by itself in your brain, like a disease, whether one wants it to or not."

International critical reception was mainly positive as well. Nick Mason of FasterLouder called the album "immensely enjoyable", and a writer for The AU Review complimented Gessle for "still [writing] some damn fine, extremely catchy pop music". They went on to say that the album showed "a deeper sense of emotion and passion" than other modern pop music, elaborating: "There's a strong leaning towards The Beatles' early catalogue, and also fellow countrymen champions of pop gold ABBA." A writer for The Hindu expressed a similar sentiment: "What sets Roxette apart from their counterparts is their writing, which is as passionate as their splendid pop hooks." They summarised by saying of the album: "Existing fans are bound to like it, new listeners won't have too much to dislike. The good news is that Travelling is definitely more charming than Charm School." Monsters and Critics praised the diversity of material found on the record: "In the new songs, Beatles fan [Per Gessle] lets his love for '60s pop and '70s classic rock run wild: 'Me & You & Terry & Julie' captivates with a Motown soul-organ pop refrain and a Kinks reference, while 'Lover, Lover, Lover' is reminiscent of Albert Hammond's evergreen 'It Never Rains in Southern California'." In a brief review, Barry Walters of Spin said: "Now that their Scandinavian students call the pop shots, these '80s throwbacks finally sound contemporary."

It also received some mixed reviews. Dagens Nyheter praised Fredriksson's vocals, particularly on "Perfect Excuse", but said: "It may be symptomatic that a novelty orchestral version of 'It Must Have Been Love' appears to be one of the album's strongest tracks." Although Nerikes Allehanda complimented the newly composed songs, they called some of the older songs "inadequate" and said they "should have remained the b-sides and outtakes they once were". They summarised by writing: "Overall, this is really an album for the already-inaugurated Roxette fans." Oberösterreichische Nachrichten claimed the album lacked memorable hooks, while Jan Andersson of the Göteborgs-Posten rated the album 2 out of 5 and criticised it for being too similar to the band's earlier work, writing: "How does Travelling sound? You know how it sounds. There are strings and swing-in-axes, straddled power pop with ringing Tom Petty guitars, and big radio ballads."

== Commercial performance ==
The record was not as commercially successful as the duo's preceding studio albums. Prior to its release, Gessle criticised Capitol Records for the lack of promotion the album was receiving in certain territories, saying: "Yeah, I don't know, sometimes you're hot, sometimes you're not. ... Well, considering the latest reception with Charm School, I mean, there's no indication [that Capitol promotes Roxette in Australia]. We sold 100,000 concert tickets there but only a thousand copies of Charm School. And it's the same with the UK, we sold 13,000 tickets in London at Wembley Arena, but Charm School has sold 3,000 copies in the UK. So, you know, someone is not doing their job right!"

It debuted at number eight on the Swedish Albums Chart before peaking at number seven on its second week, making it the lowest-charting studio album of the duo's career in their native country. It ended 2012 as the 76th best-selling album of the year in that country, and was certified gold by the Swedish Recording Industry Association for shipments in excess of 20,000 units. The album peaked at a career-low number twelve on the Swiss Hitparade, far below their previous or subsequent studio albums, which all peaked within the top two. It is also their only studio album to peak outside the top ten of the Austrian Albums Chart, where it reached number fifteen. The set did peak within the top ten of two other countries: the Czech Republic and Germany. In the United Kingdom, the album debuted at number 143.

== Track listing ==
All lyrics are written by Per Gessle; all music is composed by Gessle, except "See Me" by Marie Fredriksson.

Travelling: Songs from Studios, Stages, Hotel Rooms and Other Strange Places – Original release
No.	Title	Recorded	Length
1.	"Me & You & Terry & Julie"	Tits & Ass Studio (June 2011); Aerosol Grey Machine and Atlantis Studios (2011)	3:45
2.	"Lover, Lover, Lover"	Tits & Ass Studio (August 2011); Aerosol Grey Machine and Atlantis Studios (2011)	3:59
3.	"Turn of the Tide"	Tits & Ass Studio (September 1997); Cape Town and Sun City (May 2011); Aerosol Grey Machine (2011)	4:10
4.	"Touched By the Hand of God"	Tits & Ass Studio (September 2009); Aerosol Grey Machine and Atlantis Studios (2011)	3:48
5.	"Easy Way Out"	Aerosol Grey Machine (2011)	3:38
6.	"It's Possible" (Version One)	Tits & Ass Studio (July 2011); Aerosol Grey Machine and Atlantis Studios (2011)	2:38
7.	"Perfect Excuse"	Aerosol Grey Machine and Atlantis Studios (2011)	3:40
8.	"Excuse Me, Sir, Do You Want Me to Check on Your Wife?"	Tits & Ass Studio (October 2009); Aerosol Grey Machine and Atlantis Studios (2011)	4:15
9.	"Angel Passing"	Aerosol Grey Machine (2011)	2:46
10.	"Stars" (Live)	Dubai World Trade Centre (20 May 2011)	3:35
11.	"The Weight of the World"	Tits & Ass Studio (October 1998); Polar Studios (June 2002)	2:52
12.	"She's Got Nothing On (But the Radio)" (Live)	Citibank Hall (16 April 2011)	4:41
13.	"See Me"	EMI Studios and Capri Digital Studios (1993); Aerosol Grey Machine (2011)	3:48
14.	"It's Possible" (Version Two)	Tits & Ass Studio (July 2011); Aerosol Grey Machine and Atlantis Studios (2011)	2:44
15.	"It Must Have Been Love" (Live from Night of the Proms)	Rotterdam Ahoy (18–24 November 2009)	4:17
Total length:			54:36

Travelling – Vinyl edition (bonus tracks)
No.	Title	Recorded	Length
16.	"Me & You & Terry & Julie" (Demo)	Tits & Ass Studio (9 June 2011)	2:46
17.	"Charm School" ("Touched By the Hand of God" Demo)	Tits & Ass Studio (10 September 2009)	2:07
Total length:			59:29

== Personnel ==
Credits adapted from the liner notes of Travelling.

- Roxette are Per Gessle and Marie Fredriksson.
- Recorded at Atlantis Studios, EMI Studios and Polar Studios in Stockholm; Tits & Ass Studio in Halmstad; The Aerosol Grey Machine in Scania, Sweden; Capri Digital Studios in Capri, Italy; "Turn of the Tide" recorded in hotel rooms in Cape Town and Sun City; live tracks recorded at the Dubai World Trade Centre in Dubai, United Arab Emirates; Citibank Hall in Rio de Janeiro, Brazil; the Rotterdam Ahoy in Rotterdam, the Netherlands between 1993 and 2011.
- All songs mixed by Christoffer Lundquist at The Aerosol Grey Machine in January and February 2012, except "The Weight of the World" mixed by Ronny Lahti at Polar Studios in June 2002.
- Mastered by Björn Engelmann at Cutting Room Studios in Stockholm.

Musicians

- Marie Fredriksson – lead and background vocals, production (track 11), keyboards and synthesizer (track 13)
- Per Gessle – lead and background vocals, guitars, harmonica, production
- Per "Pelle" Alsing – drums and percussion
- Magnus Börjeson – background vocals and bass
- Helena Josefsson – background vocals and percussion
- Christoffer Lundquist – background vocals, guitars, bass, keyboards, autoharp, saxophone, flute, drums and percussion, engineering, production, string arrangements
- Clarence Öfwerman – background vocals, keyboards, percussion, production, string arrangements

Additional musicians and technical personnel

- Sven Andersson – tenor saxophone
- Colin van der Bel – photography
- Justyna Bereza – photography
- Mikael Bolyos – photography
- Marie Dimberg – artist management (for D&D Management)
- Tomas Ebrelius – violin
- Martin Eriksson – strings
- Fredrik Etoall – photography
- Fredrik Glastuen – photography
- Lennart Haglund – assistant engineer
- Kai Uwe Heinze – photography
- Bo "BoBo" Johansson – tour manager (for Live Nation Entertainment)
- Thomas Johansson – tour producer (for Live Nation Entertainment)
- Ronny Lahti – engineer (track 11)
- Bob Lewandoski – photography
- Petter Lindgård – trumpet
- Mats Nilemar – business management (for Desert Business)
- Åsa Nordin-Gessle – photography
- Mats "MP" Persson – demo recording engineer
- Important Pete – photography
- Andreas Roslund – strings
- Johanna Skoglund – strings
- Pär Wickholm – cover and sleeve design
- Lotte Weber Widerström – cello

== Charts ==
=== Weekly charts ===
Chart (2012)	Peak; position
Australian Albums (ARIA)	132
Austrian Albums (Ö3 Austria)	15
Belgian Albums (Ultratop Flanders)	78
Czech Albums (ČNS IFPI)	8
Danish Albums (Hitlisten)	30
Dutch Albums (Album Top 100)	32
Finnish Albums (Suomen virallinen lista)	27
German Albums (Offizielle Top 100)	7
Hungarian Albums (MAHASZ)	34
Norwegian Albums (VG-lista)	36
Spanish Albums (Promusicae)	32
Swedish Albums (Sverigetopplistan)	7
Swiss Albums (Schweizer Hitparade)	12
UK Albums (OCC)	143

=== Year-end charts ===
Chart (2012)	Position
Swedish Albums (Sverigetopplistan)	76

== Certifications ==
Region	Certification	Certified units/sales
Sweden (GLF)	Gold	20,000^{‡}
^{‡} Sales+streaming figures based on certification alone.

== Release history ==
Region	Date	Format	Label	Catalog #	Ref.
Australia	23 March 2012	CD; vinyl; digital download	Roxette Recordings; Capitol	50999 440653–2 4	
New Zealand	23 March 2012	CD; vinyl; digital download	Roxette Recordings; Capitol	50999 440653–2 4	
Europe	26 March 2012	CD; vinyl; digital download	Roxette Recordings; Capitol	50999 440653–2 4	
United Kingdom	2 April 2012	CD; vinyl; digital download	Roxette Recordings; Capitol	50999 440653–2 4	
Russia	6 April 2012	CD; digital download	Roxette Recordings; Gala Records	50999 464402–2 8	
United States	5 June 2012	CD; digital download	Roxette Recordings; Capitol	50999 440653–2 4	
Canada	12 June 2012	CD; digital download	Roxette Recordings; Capitol	50999 440653–2 4	
