= The Neverending World Tour =

2009–16 series of concert tours by Roxette

- World tour by Roxette
- Poster to the 2011 concert in Munich, Germany
- Location: Eurasia, Americas, Oceania and Africa
- Associated albums: Charm School, Travelling, Live: Travelling the World, Roxette XXX – The 30 Biggest Hits, The RoxBox!: A Collection of Roxette's Greatest Songs and Good Karma
- Start date: 23 October 2009
- End date: 8 February 2016
- Legs: 17
- No. of shows: 256 total: 166 in Europe; 24 in South America; 20 in Oceania; 15 in South Africa; 13 in Asia; 12 in North America; 3 in the Middle East
- Attendance: 2.5 million (excluding festivals)
- Box office: $24,470,954 (based on 45 reported shows)

Roxette concert chronology
- Room Service Tour (2001); The Neverending World Tour (2009–16)

"The Neverending World Tour" was the umbrella name used to describe a series of concert tours by Swedish pop duo Roxette. The name was derived from the title of the duo's debut single, 1986's "Neverending Love". Their sixth and final concert tour, it took place from 23 October 2009 until 8 February 2016, and consisted of 17 separate legs which saw the duo performing a total of 256 concerts in Europe, North and South America, Africa, the Middle East, Australasia and Asia.

It was their first concert tour in over eight years, following vocalist Marie Fredriksson's brain tumour diagnosis in September 2002. That diagnosis led to the cancellation of Roxette's planned appearance at the 2002 Night of the Proms concert series. "The Neverending World Tour" began with the band performing at the 2009 edition of that series, followed by a seven-date warm-up tour of Europe the following year, and more extensive tours in support of studio albums Charm School (2011) and Travelling (2012). Despite those two albums being released over the duration of the tour, set lists primarily consisted of many of their greatest hits; Fredriksson was unable to remember the lyrics of new songs because the illness impacted her short-term memory.

The tour received generally positive reviews, with numerous publications praising Fredriksson's voice and the quality of Gessle's songwriting. It was also a commercial success; the band performed to over 2.5 million people by the time the tour concluded in 2016, with a confirmed box office figure of over US$24 million, based on 45 shows reported to Billboard. The tour was due to be extended beyond 2016 as part of promotion for the duo's tenth studio album, Good Karma (2016). However, these dates were cancelled when Fredriksson was advised by her doctors to cease all touring activity, due to poor health.

== Background and conception ==
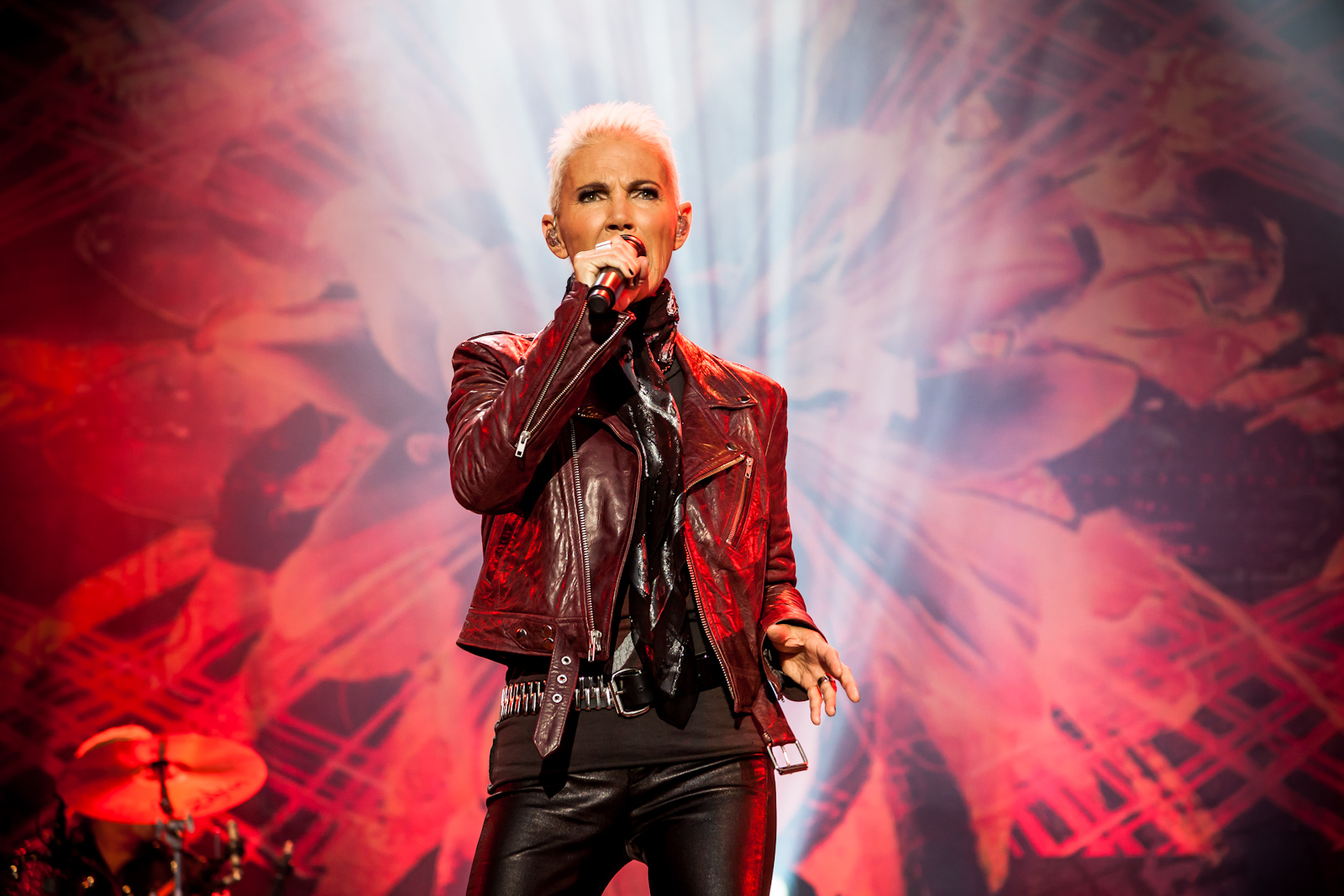
Marie Fredriksson performing at Odderøya in Kristiansand, Norway on 13 July 2012.

The duo's seventh studio album, Room Service (2001), was promoted by their first concert tour in almost six years. Roxette were due to follow up this tour with a stint performing on the multiple-act Night of the Proms concert series, which was to begin in October 2002 and would see the band performing throughout Europe with a live orchestra to over 630,000 attendees during 52 shows. However, on 11 September 2002, vocalist Marie Fredriksson fractured her cranium after collapsing in a bathroom in her home. MRI scans later showed she had a brain tumour in the back of her head. She underwent surgery to successfully remove the malignant tumour, followed by months of chemotherapy and radiation treatment, Fredriksson was left permanently blinded in her right eye, and unable to read or write. She also could not speak for a considerable period of time afterward. All promotional activity for the duo's then-upcoming greatest hits compilation The Ballad Hits (2002) was subsequently cancelled, along with their scheduled appearance at Night of the Proms.

Fredriksson and Per Gessle each released solo albums over the following years, (Note: Fredriksson released her first English-language solo album, The Change, in 2004, followed by Min bäste vän in 2006 and a compilation, Tid för tystnad – Marie Fredrikssons ballader (2007); as well as the non-album single "Där du andas" (2008). Gessle released the solo albums Mazarin (2003); Son of a Plumber (2005); En händig man (2007); Party Crasher (2008); and an album with his former band Gyllene Tider, Finn 5 fel! (2004).) briefly reuniting as Roxette to record two new songs for their 2006 greatest hits compilation A Collection of Roxette Hits: Their 20 Greatest Songs!. During the 6 May 2009 date of the "Party Crasher Tour" at the Melkweg in Amsterdam – Gessle's European tour in support of his same-titled 2008 solo album – he and his band were joined on-stage by Fredriksson to perform acoustic renditions of several Roxette songs. Immediately after the gig, Gessle announced to Swedish publication Aftonbladet that Roxette would perform at the 2009 edition of Night of the Proms, which would begin on 23 October. That same date, Swedish newspaper Expressen reported that the duo had been recording material for a new Roxette album since May 2009. Marie also joined Per on stage again on 10 May 2009 at the Cirkus in Stockholm.

== Tours and recordings ==
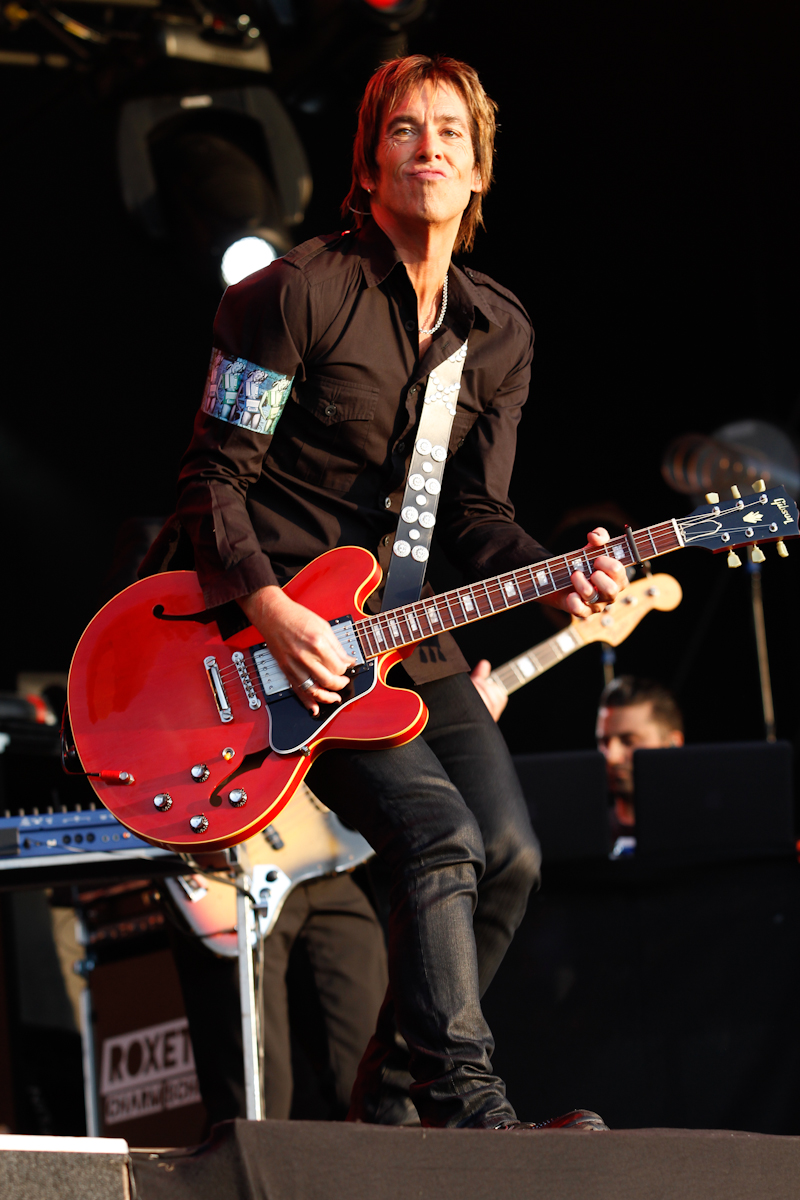
Per Gessle performing at Bospop in Weert, the Netherlands on 9 July 2011.

The band performed a series of seven warm-up shows throughout Europe, beginning on 4 August 2010 at Leif's Lounge – a music venue at Gessle's own Hotel Tylösand in Halmstad – and concluding on 12 September at the Saint Petersburg Ice Palace. Roxette's eighth studio album, Charm School, was released worldwide from 11 February 2011. Deluxe editions of the CD included a bonus disc containing 12 tracks recorded live in Halmstad, Saint Petersburg and Stavanger during the 2010 tour. The "Charm School World Tour" began on 28 February 2011 and saw the band performing in Europe, Asia, South America, South Africa and the Middle East. They performed at London's Wembley Arena on 15 November, their first concert in the United Kingdom in 17 years, they last played Wembley on 15 November 1994.

Their ninth studio album, Travelling, followed on 26 March 2012. It was a successor to 1992's Tourism, although, unlike that album – which was recorded in various locations and settings throughout the world during their "Join the Joyride! Tour" – Travelling was primarily recorded in studios in Sweden in-between legs of the "Charm School World Tour". (Note: Fredriksson's vocals on "Turn of the Tide" were recorded in hotel rooms in Cape Town and Sun City in South Africa; "Stars" was recorded live during a soundcheck at the Dubai World Trade Centre; "She's Got Nothing On (But the Radio)" was recorded live on 16 April 2011 during a concert in Rio de Janeiro's Citibank Hall; the symphony orchestra on "It Must Have Been Love" was recorded live at the Rotterdam Ahoy during the 2009 Night of the Proms. Songs were also recorded in studios in Stockholm (Aerosol Grey Machine, Atlantis Studios, EMI Studios, Polar Studios) and Capri (Capri Digital Studios).) "Roxette Live: Travelling the World" was less extensive than the preceding tour: it began on 14 February and lasted seven months, taking the band to Australasia and Asia, North and South America, South Africa and Europe. The first gig of the tour, on 11 February at the Vector Arena in Auckland, was cancelled when Gessle became ill during the flight from Stockholm; it began instead two days later in Australia. Live Nation Entertainment promoted the tour, after multiple local concert promoters in the country refused to work with the duo. Tickets for their 16 February show at the Sydney Entertainment Centre sold out within 30 minutes of going on sale to the public. The band went on to perform to over 100,000 people during their ten Australian shows. By the end of 2012, they had performed 153 concerts to a total audience of 1.5 million people.

Roxette ceased all touring activity in 2013, with Gessle rejoining Gyllene Tider to release their sixth studio album, Dags att tänka på refrängen, that April, while Fredriksson released her eighth solo album, Nu!, later that year in November. Fredriksson and Gyllene Tider each toured separately in Sweden to support their releases. A live CD and DVD/Blu-ray box set, Live: Travelling the World, was released on 6 December 2013. The set consisted of footage from three concerts from the South American leg of "Roxette Live: Travelling the World". In 2014, Roxette began the "XXX – The 30th Anniversary Tour", with dates initially running from 28 October to 29 November and consisting of 15 concerts in North Asia and Europe. The release of a new greatest hits compilation, Roxette XXX – The 30 Biggest Hits on 11 November, was timed to coincide with these concerts, except in Australia, where The RoxBox!: A Collection of Roxette's Greatest Songs was released on 6 February 2015—four days before the beginning of a tour there.

Roxette continued touring throughout 2015, performing their first concert ever in New Zealand on 7 February. The tour concluded a year later with a series of shows in South Africa; their 8 February 2016 performance at the Grand West Arena in Cape Town proved to be their final show. The duo's tenth studio album, Good Karma, was released in June 2016. It was due to be promoted with further concerts throughout Europe over the proceeding months. However, all of these concert dates were cancelled when Fredriksson was advised by her doctors to stop all touring activity, due to poor health. She released a statement which said: "Sadly, now my touring days are over and I want to take this opportunity to thank our wonderful fans that [have] followed us on our long and winding journey." By the end of the tour, Roxette had performed to a total of 2.5 million people (excluding music festival appearances) in over 50 countries.

== Critical reception ==
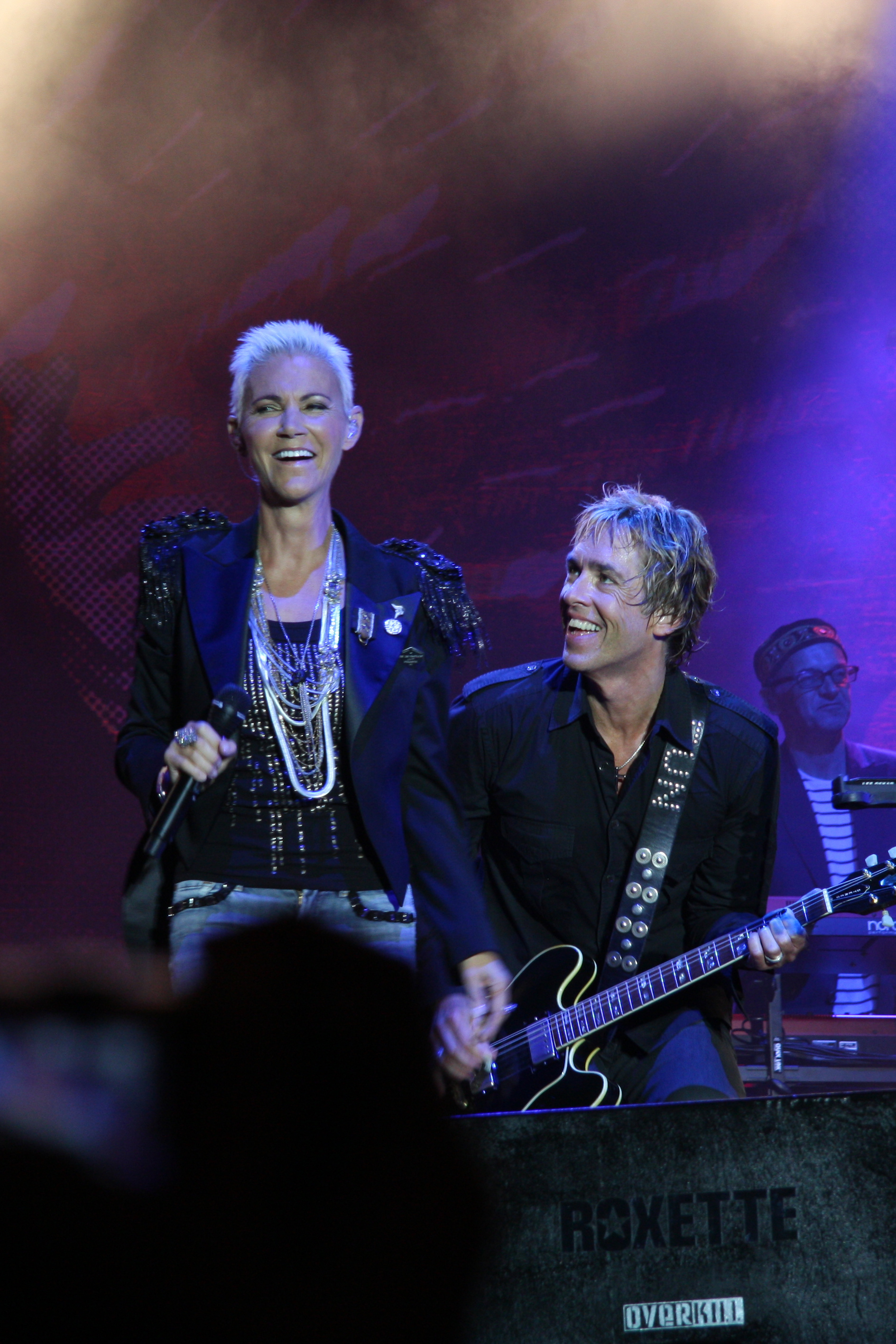
Fredriksson, Gessle and Clarence Öfwerman performing at Marknadsplatsen in Halmstad, Sweden on 14 August 2010.

Neal McClimon of The Hague Online gave a positive review to their 18 November 2009 Night of the Proms performance at the Rotterdam Ahoy, saying that they were given the "warmest welcome of the night. The fact that [they] had to cancel their previous tour due to Marie Fredriksson's well-documented [illness] seemed to resonate with the audience, [and they were] greeted by a crowd that offered thanks, warmth and love." He contrasted Roxette with other acts performing on the tour, writing: "There was one thing that stood out for me as they sang: they looked to be having a lot of fun, and it [was] great to see a band actually looking as though they wanted to be there." Time Out Dubai said that the duo "put on a phenomenal performance" for their 20 May 2011 concert at the Dubai World Trade Centre, but said the show was spoiled by the poor acoustics at the venue. They were also disappointed by the "lacklustre" crowd and asked: "If you want to stand and stare at your BlackBerry, what's the point of buying a ticket?"

The 2012 tour also received positive reviews. A writer for AusPop complimented the set list of their 14 February performance at the Brisbane Entertainment Centre, particularly the "near-flawless finale of mega hits", although was critical of the inclusion of "7Twenty7" – an album track from 1999's Have a Nice Day – "one of their least successful albums in Australia, which ultimately had everyone back in their seats." Their gig four days later in Melbourne was praised by the Herald Sun, which said: "From opener 'Dressed for Success', they had one of the most rapturous reactions the Rod Laver Arena has seen in years." The West Australian praised the entire band, writing that they "owned" Challenge Stadium during their two concerts at the Perth venue at the end of February. Fredriksson's performance at the Manchester Arena on 4 July was singled out for praise from The Guardian's Dave Simpson, who said that "the poignancy she invests into their more wistful lyrics suggests [that performance is] part of her recovery."

In a review of their 31 August show at the Bell Centre, the Montreal Gazette praised Gessle's songwriting, saying: "There's much to be said for the way [he] has been able to take the eternal beauty of the I-IV-V chord progression (think "Wild Thing" or "Twist and Shout") – one of rock's most basic and perfect statements – and use it as a foundation for his own evergreens, which still sound pretty fresh. Look no farther [sic] than 'Dressed for Success' or 'How Do You Do!' for confirmation." Rock Subculture applauded Fredriksson in their review of the band's 14 September concert in San Francisco's Nob Hill Masonic Center, writing: "The fact that she can still put on an amazing performance like last night is simply stunning. If I had not known about her history, I would never have imagined that she had such challenges in the past and overcame them in such a way."

By the beginning of the "XXX – The 30th Anniversary Tour" in late 2014, Fredriksson performed the entirety of concerts while sitting on a chair on stage. Will Gore of The Independent said of their 13 July 2015 London concert that there were "any number of '80 bands who make a living from neatly-packaged nostalgia tours. But not many could sell-out The O_{2} Arena on their own on a Monday night. ... Yet more than any other European band of that era, Roxette bridged the pop craft of their compatriots ABBA with the rockier sensibilities of American counterparts Heart and even Madonna. Their American success is easy to forget—four number ones between 1989 and 1991. Yet they became, unfairly, regarded as a pastiche almost as quickly." He contrasted this with Fredriksson's "current physical vulnerability" while performing on stage, which he called "a genuinely moving counterpoint to the charge of soullessness which often dogged Roxette's critical reception in the past. It might not be too late for a proper reappraisal."

Andy Rudd of the Daily Mirror reviewed the same concert, and remarked that Fredriksson "still hit all the power high notes, despite remaining seated for all the gig." He went on to praise her "haunting" and "beautiful vocal tones". Similarly, Goldenplec writer Mary Sexton said of their 1 June concert at the 3Arena in Dublin that Fredriksson was "sensational; her voice has a gorgeous timbre switching between her delicate head voice and her lower belt voice." Although she additionally noted that "during her solo moments, there are elements of dodgy intonation which may indicate why her voice is a bit lower in the mix. But make no mistake, she is a sensation, and you cannot possibly take your eyes off of her. Her tiny frame swells and fills the stage as she commands the audiences' attention." Annelise Ball echoed a similar sentiment in her review of their 20 February concert at the Rod Laver Arena in Melbourne, saying that "Despite her evident frailty, Fredriksson's voice is as strong and lovely as ever." She concluded by writing: "Fredriksson, you deserve accolades not only for your exceptional talent but also for your strength, courage and grace under pressure."

== Set lists ==
The songs performed during each leg of the tour changed considerably as it progressed, with Gessle initially singing the majority of tracks. He said: "We had to take it step by step. I sang maybe 60–65% of the songs to begin with, and then the more we played the more Marie could sing." Each tour generally consisted of a "greatest hits"-type set list, as Fredriksson's illness "affected her short-term memory, making it difficult to learn new lyrics, while the old hits are inked firmly in her brain."

Leif's Lounge in Halmstad (4 August 2010)
1. "Dressed for Success"
2. "Sleeping in My Car"
3. "Opportunity Nox"
4. "The Big L."
5. "Wish I Could Fly"
6. "She Doesn't Live Here Anymore"
7. "7Twenty7"
8. "Perfect Day"
9. "Things Will Never Be the Same"
10. "It Must Have Been Love"
11. "Stupid"
12. "Do You Wanna Be My Baby?"
13. "Silver Blue"
14. "Fading Like a Flower (Every Time You Leave)"
15. "How Do You Do!"
16. "Dangerous"
17. "Joyride"
18. "Listen to Your Heart"
19. "The Look"
20. "(I'm Not Your) Steppin' Stone" (Paul Revere & the Raiders cover)
21. "Church of Your Heart"
Luna Park in Buenos Aires (4 April 2011)
1. "Dressed for Success"
2. "Sleeping in My Car"
3. "The Big L."
4. "Wish I Could Fly"
5. "Only When I Dream"
6. "She's Got Nothing On (But the Radio)"
7. "Perfect Day"
8. "Things Will Never Be the Same"
9. "It Must Have Been Love"
10. "Opportunity Nox"
11. "7Twenty7"
12. "Fading Like a Flower (Every Time You Leave)"
13. "Stars"
14. "How Do You Do!"
15. "Dangerous"
16. "Joyride"
17. "Watercolours in the Rain"
18. "Spending My Time"
19. "The Look"
20. "Way Out"
21. "Listen to Your Heart"
22. "Church of Your Heart"
Nob Hill Masonic Center in San Francisco (14 September 2012)
1. "Dressed for Success"
2. "Sleeping in My Car"
3. "The Big L."
4. "Spending My Time"
5. "Stars"
6. "She's Got Nothing On (But the Radio)"
7. "Perfect Day"
8. "Things Will Never Be the Same"
9. "It Must Have Been Love"
10. "7Twenty7"
11. "Fading Like a Flower (Every Time You Leave)"
12. "Crash! Boom! Bang!"
13. "How Do You Do!"
14. "Dangerous"
15. "Joyride"
16. "Listen to Your Heart"
17. "The Look"
18. "Church of Your Heart"
Adelaide Entertainment Centre (17 February 2015)
1. "Sleeping in My Car"
2. "The Big L."
3. "Stars"
4. "Spending My Time"
5. "Crash! Boom! Bang!"
6. "Crush on You"
7. "She's Got Nothing On (But the Radio)"
8. "The Heart Shaped Sea
9. "Watercolours in the Rain" / "Paint"
10. "Fading Like a Flower (Every Time You Leave)"
11. "How Do You Do!"
12. "It Must Have Been Love"
13. "Dressed for Success"
14. "Dangerous"
15. "Joyride"
16. "Almost Unreal"
17. "Listen to Your Heart"
18. "The Look"

== Tour dates ==
List of concerts, showing date, city, country, venue, opening acts, tickets sold, number of available tickets and amount of gross revenue
Date	City	Country	Venue	Attendance	Revenue
Night of the Proms
Europe
23 October 2009	Antwerp	Belgium	Sportpaleis	164,218 / 170,966	$6,417,120
24 October 2009	Antwerp	Belgium	Sportpaleis	164,218 / 170,966	$6,417,120
25 October 2009	Antwerp	Belgium	Sportpaleis	164,218 / 170,966	$6,417,120
28 October 2009	Antwerp	Belgium	Sportpaleis	164,218 / 170,966	$6,417,120
29 October 2009	Antwerp	Belgium	Sportpaleis	164,218 / 170,966	$6,417,120
30 October 2009	Antwerp	Belgium	Sportpaleis	164,218 / 170,966	$6,417,120
31 October 2009	Antwerp	Belgium	Sportpaleis	164,218 / 170,966	$6,417,120
4 November 2009	Antwerp	Belgium	Sportpaleis	164,218 / 170,966	$6,417,120
6 November 2009	Antwerp	Belgium	Sportpaleis	164,218 / 170,966	$6,417,120
7 November 2009	Antwerp	Belgium	Sportpaleis	164,218 / 170,966	$6,417,120
8 November 2009	Antwerp	Belgium	Sportpaleis	164,218 / 170,966	$6,417,120
10 November 2009	Antwerp	Belgium	Sportpaleis	164,218 / 170,966	$6,417,120
11 November 2009	Antwerp	Belgium	Sportpaleis	164,218 / 170,966	$6,417,120
13 November 2009	Arnhem	Netherlands	GelreDome	186,000 / 192,726	—N/a
14 November 2009	Arnhem	Netherlands	GelreDome	186,000 / 192,726	—N/a
18 November 2009	Rotterdam	Netherlands	Sportpaleis van Ahoy	186,000 / 192,726	—N/a
19 November 2009	Rotterdam	Netherlands	Sportpaleis van Ahoy	186,000 / 192,726	—N/a
20 November 2009	Rotterdam	Netherlands	Sportpaleis van Ahoy	186,000 / 192,726	—N/a
21 November 2009	Rotterdam	Netherlands	Sportpaleis van Ahoy	186,000 / 192,726	—N/a
22 November 2009	Rotterdam	Netherlands	Sportpaleis van Ahoy	186,000 / 192,726	—N/a
23 November 2009	Rotterdam	Netherlands	Sportpaleis van Ahoy	186,000 / 192,726	—N/a
24 November 2009	Rotterdam	Netherlands	Sportpaleis van Ahoy	186,000 / 192,726	—N/a
27 November 2009	Hamburg	Germany	O_{2} World	250,000 / 266,000	—N/a
28 November 2009	Hamburg	Germany	O_{2} World	250,000 / 266,000	—N/a
29 November 2009	Berlin	Germany	O_{2} World	250,000 / 266,000	—N/a
1 December 2009	Oberhausen	Germany	König Pilsener Arena	250,000 / 266,000	—N/a
2 December 2009	Mannheim	Germany	SAP Arena	250,000 / 266,000	—N/a
3 December 2009	Stuttgart	Germany	Hanns-Martin-Schleyer-Halle	250,000 / 266,000	—N/a
4 December 2009	Frankfurt	Germany	Festhalle	250,000 / 266,000	—N/a
5 December 2009	Frankfurt	Germany	Festhalle	250,000 / 266,000	—N/a
6 December 2009	Frankfurt	Germany	Festhalle	250,000 / 266,000	—N/a
8 December 2009	Erfurt	Germany	Messehalle	250,000 / 266,000	—N/a
10 December 2009	Munich	Germany	Olympiahalle	250,000 / 266,000	—N/a
11 December 2009	Munich	Germany	Olympiahalle	250,000 / 266,000	—N/a
12 December 2009	Munich	Germany	Olympiahalle	250,000 / 266,000	—N/a
13 December 2009	Munich	Germany	Olympiahalle	250,000 / 266,000	—N/a
15 December 2009	Bremen	Germany	AWD Dome	250,000 / 266,000	—N/a
16 December 2009	Hanover	Germany	TUI Arena	250,000 / 266,000	—N/a
17 December 2009	Hanover	Germany	TUI Arena	250,000 / 266,000	—N/a
18 December 2009	Cologne	Germany	Lanxess Arena	250,000 / 266,000	—N/a
19 December 2009	Cologne	Germany	Lanxess Arena	250,000 / 266,000	—N/a
20 December 2009	Dortmund	Germany	Westfalenhallen	250,000 / 266,000	—N/a
European Mini-Tour
18 June 2010 (Note: This was a private concert held in celebration of the Wedding of Victoria, Crown Princess of Sweden, and Daniel Westling.)	Stockholm	Sweden	Stockholm Palace	—N/a	—N/a
4 August 2010	Halmstad	Sweden	Leif's Lounge	—N/a	—N/a
7 August 2010	Sundsvall	Sweden	Norrporten Arena	—N/a	—N/a
8 August 2010	Skanderborg	Denmark	Smukfest	—N/a	—N/a
14 August 2010	Halmstad	Sweden	Marknadsplatsen	—N/a	—N/a
21 August 2010	Stavanger	Norway	Vistestranden	—N/a	—N/a
10 September 2010	Moscow	Russia	Megasport Arena	—N/a	—N/a
12 September 2010	Saint Petersburg	Russia	Ice Palace	—N/a	—N/a
1 January 2011 (Note: This was a public concert held in celebration of New Year's Day in Warsaw.)	Warsaw	Poland	Constitution Square	—N/a	—N/a
Charm School World Tour
North Asia and Europe
28 February 2011	Kazan	Russia	TatNeft Arena	—N/a	—N/a
3 March 2011	Samara	Russia	MTL Arena	—N/a	—N/a
5 March 2011	Yekaterinburg	Russia	Palace of Sports	—N/a	—N/a
7 March 2011	Novosibirsk	Russia	Siberia Arena	—N/a	—N/a
10 March 2011	Kyiv	Ukraine	Exhibition Centre	—N/a	—N/a
12 March 2011	Minsk	Belarus	Minsk-Arena	—N/a	—N/a
14 March 2011	Vilnius	Lithuania	Siemens Arena	—N/a	—N/a
16 March 2011	Riga	Latvia	Riga Arena	—N/a	—N/a
Latin America
2 April 2011	Montevideo	Uruguay	Velódromo	—N/a	—N/a
4 April 2011	Buenos Aires	Argentina	Luna Park	8,293 / 15,321	$1,133,320
5 April 2011	Buenos Aires	Argentina	Luna Park	8,293 / 15,321	$1,133,320
7 April 2011	Córdoba	Argentina	Orfeo Superdomo	—N/a	—N/a
9 April 2011	Santiago	Chile	Movistar Arena	10,460 / 12,311	$680,420
12 April 2011	Porto Alegre	Brazil	Pepsi on Stage	5,772 / 7,154	$415,637
14 April 2011	São Paulo	Brazil	Credicard Hall	13,351 / 14,126	$1,134,020
16 April 2011	Rio de Janeiro	Brazil	Citibank Hall	7,959 / 7,959	$594,871
17 April 2011	Belo Horizonte	Brazil	Chevrolet Hall	4,681 / 5,438	$384,832
19 April 2011	São Paulo	Brazil	Credicard Hall	(Note: This score data is also represented in the score data shown for the band's 14 April concert at the same venue, as the data was presented to Billboard cumulatively.)	
Africa
8 May 2011	Cape Town	South Africa	Grand West Arena	—N/a	—N/a
10 May 2011	Cape Town	South Africa	Grand West Arena	—N/a	—N/a
11 May 2011	Cape Town	South Africa	Grand West Arena	—N/a	—N/a
13 May 2011	Sun City	South Africa	Sun City Superbowl	—N/a	—N/a
14 May 2011	Sun City	South Africa	Sun City Superbowl	—N/a	—N/a
15 May 2011	Sun City	South Africa	Sun City Superbowl	—N/a	—N/a
17 May 2011	Sun City	South Africa	Sun City Superbowl	—N/a	—N/a
Middle East
20 May 2011	Dubai	United Arab Emirates	World Trade Centre	—N/a	—N/a
25 May 2011	Istanbul	Turkey	Maçka Küçükçiftlik Park	—N/a	—N/a
Europe
27 May 2011	Athens	Greece	Terra Vibe Park	—N/a	—N/a
29 May 2011	Sofia	Bulgaria	Georgi Asparuhov Stadium	—N/a	—N/a
30 May 2011	Bucharest	Romania	Zone Arena	—N/a	—N/a
1 June 2011	Budapest	Hungary	Budapest Sports Arena	—N/a	—N/a
3 June 2011	Graz	Austria	Schwarzl Freizeit Zentrum	—N/a	—N/a
5 June 2011	Prague	Czech Republic	O_{2} Arena	—N/a	—N/a
6 June 2011	Košice	Slovakia	Steel Aréna	—N/a	—N/a
9 June 2011	Bergen	Norway	Plenen	—N/a	—N/a
11 June 2011	Berlin	Germany	Zitadelle	—N/a	—N/a
12 June 2011	Oberursel	Germany	Hessentagsarena	—N/a	—N/a
15 June 2011	Leipzig	Germany	Völkerschlachtdenkmal	—N/a	—N/a
16 June 2011	Cologne	Germany	Tanzbrunnen	—N/a	—N/a
19 June 2011	Warsaw	Poland	Torwar Hall	—N/a	—N/a
24 June 2011	Neckarsulm	Germany	Audi Werksgelände	—N/a	—N/a
25 June 2011	Ingolstadt	Germany	Audi Sportpark	—N/a	—N/a
27 June 2011	Ostrava	Czech Republic	Čez Aréna	—N/a	—N/a
7 July 2011	Stavern	Norway	Stavernfestivalen	—N/a	—N/a
9 July 2011	Weert	Netherlands	Bospop	—N/a	—N/a
14 July 2011	Locarno	Switzerland	Moon and Stars Festival	—N/a	—N/a
16 July 2011	Pargas	Finland	Rowlit Festival	—N/a	—N/a
22 July 2011	Copenhagen	Denmark	Tivoli Gardens	—N/a	—N/a
24 July 2011	Gothenburg	Sweden	Slottsskogsvallen	—N/a	—N/a
29 July 2011	Haugesund	Norway	Haugesund Stadion	—N/a	—N/a
31 July 2011	Tienen	Belgium	Suikerrock Festival	—N/a	—N/a
1 September 2011	Tromsø	Norway	Døgnvillfestival	—N/a	—N/a
10 October 2011	Vienna	Austria	Stadthalle	—N/a	—N/a
11 October 2011	Munich	Germany	Olympiahalle	—N/a	—N/a
13 October 2011	Hanover	Germany	TUI Arena	—N/a	—N/a
14 October 2011	Halle	Germany	Gerry Weber Arena	—N/a	—N/a
16 October 2011	Mannheim	Germany	SAP Arena	—N/a	—N/a
17 October 2011	Stuttgart	Germany	Schleyerhalle	—N/a	—N/a
19 October 2011	Oberhausen	Germany	König Pilsener Arena	—N/a	—N/a
Middle East
22 October 2011	Tel Aviv	Israel	Tel Aviv Convention Center	—N/a	—N/a
Europe
24 October 2011	Berlin	Germany	O_{2} World	7,172 / 9,327	$538,771
25 October 2011	Hamburg	Germany	O_{2} World	7,989 / 11,476	$610,047
27 October 2011	Nuremberg	Germany	Nuremberg Arena	—N/a	—N/a
30 October 2011	Geneva	Switzerland	SEG Geneva Arena	—N/a	—N/a
31 October 2011	Zürich	Switzerland	Hallenstadion	—N/a	—N/a
3 November 2011	Stockholm	Sweden	Ericsson Globe	—N/a	—N/a
4 November 2011	Malmö	Sweden	Malmö Arena	—N/a	—N/a
5 November 2011	Horsens	Denmark	Forum Horsens Arena	—N/a	—N/a
8 November 2011	Helsinki	Finland	Hartwall Arena	—N/a	—N/a
15 November 2011	London	United Kingdom	Wembley Arena	12,500 / 12,500	—N/a
18 November 2011	Madrid	Spain	Palacio Vistalegre	—N/a	—N/a
19 November 2011	Barcelona	Spain	Palau Sant Jordi	—N/a	—N/a
26 November 2011	Ischgl	Austria	Sportplatz	—N/a	—N/a
1 December 2011	Moscow	Russia	Crocus City Hall	—N/a	—N/a
3 December 2011	Saint Petersburg	Russia	Ice Palace	—N/a	—N/a
6 December 2011	Kyiv	Ukraine	Palace of Sports	—N/a	—N/a
Roxette Live: Travelling the World Tour
Oceania
14 February 2012	Brisbane	Australia	Brisbane Entertainment Centre	16,625 / 16,969	$1,621,670
16 February 2012	Sydney	Australia	Sydney Entertainment Centre	27,726 / 28,479	$2,324,570
17 February 2012	Sydney	Australia	Sydney Entertainment Centre	27,726 / 28,479	$2,324,570
18 February 2012	Melbourne	Australia	Rod Laver Arena	20,432 / 22,000	$1,852,520
20 February 2012	Adelaide	Australia	Adelaide Entertainment Centre	—N/a	—N/a
22 February 2012	Melbourne	Australia	Rod Laver Arena	(Note: This score data is also represented in the figures shown for the band's 18 February concert at the same venue, as the data was presented to Billboard cumulatively.)	
24 February 2012	Brisbane	Australia	Brisbane Entertainment Centre	(Note: This score data is also represented in the figures shown for their 14 February concert at the same venue, as the data was presented to Billboard cumulatively.)	
25 February 2012	Sydney	Australia	Sydney Entertainment Centre	(Note: This score data is also represented in the figures shown for their concerts on 16 and 17 February at the same venue, as the data was presented to Billboard cumulatively.)	
28 February 2012	Perth	Australia	Challenge Stadium	—N/a	—N/a
29 February 2012	Perth	Australia	Challenge Stadium	—N/a	—N/a
Asia
3 March 2012	Jakarta	Indonesia	MEIS Ancol	—N/a	—N/a
6 March 2012	Kallang	Singapore	Singapore Indoor Stadium	—N/a	—N/a
8 March 2012	Hong Kong		Convention and Exhibition Centre	—N/a	—N/a
10 March 2012	Taipei	Taiwan	ATT Show Box	—N/a	—N/a
12 March 2012	Beijing	China	MasterCard Center	—N/a	—N/a
14 March 2012	Shanghai	China	Shanghai Indoor Stadium	—N/a	—N/a
Latin America
17 April 2012	Caracas	Venezuela	Terraza del C.C.C.T.	—N/a	—N/a
19 April 2012	Quito	Ecuador	Coliseo Rumiñahui	—N/a	—N/a
21 April 2012	Lima	Peru	Estadio Monumental Explanada	—N/a	—N/a
24 April 2012	Buenos Aires	Argentina	Luna Park	—N/a	—N/a
26 April 2012	Neuquén	Argentina	Estadio Ruca Che	—N/a	—N/a
28 April 2012	Mar del Plata	Argentina	Estadio Polideportivo	—N/a	—N/a
30 April 2012	Rosario	Argentina	Salón Metropolitano	—N/a	—N/a
3 May 2012	Córdoba	Argentina	Orfeo Superdromo	—N/a	—N/a
5 May 2012	Santiago	Chile	Teatro Caupolicán	—N/a	—N/a
8 May 2012	Curitiba	Brazil	Teatro Positivo	—N/a	—N/a
10 May 2012	São Paulo	Brazil	Credicard Hall	6,026 / 6,096	$430,512
12 May 2012	Rio de Janeiro	Brazil	Citibank Hall	4,175 / 7,771	$288,227
15 May 2012	Brasília	Brazil	Ginásio Nilson Nelson	4,424 / 8,006	$255,330
18 May 2012	Recife	Brazil	Chevrolet Hall	4,836 / 11,315	$254,542
South Africa
3 June 2012	Johannesburg	Africa	Ticketpro Dome	—N/a	—N/a
5 June 2012	Durban	Africa	ICC Arena	—N/a	—N/a
8 June 2012	Cape Town	Africa	Grand West Arena	—N/a	—N/a
Europe
27 June 2012	Borlänge	Sweden	Peace & Love Festival	—N/a	—N/a
29 June 2012	Amsterdam	Netherlands	Heineken Music Hall	—N/a	—N/a
30 June 2012	Kaiserslautern	Germany	Fritz-Walter-Stadion	—N/a	—N/a
3 July 2012	Glasgow	United Kingdom	Scottish Exhibition Hall 4	—N/a	—N/a
4 July 2012	Manchester	United Kingdom	Manchester Arena	5,595 / 7,095	$307,030
6 July 2012	Birmingham	United Kingdom	LG Arena	—N/a	—N/a
9 July 2012	Dublin	Ireland	The O_{2}	—N/a	—N/a
13 July 2012	Kristiansand	Norway	Odderøya	—N/a	—N/a
14 July 2012	Halden	Norway	Fredriksten Fortress	—N/a	—N/a
17 July 2012	Zürich	Switzerland	Live at Sunset Festival	—N/a	—N/a
19 July 2012	Cluj-Napoca	Romania	Cluj Arena	—N/a	—N/a
24 July 2012	Gdańsk–Sopot	Poland	Ergo Arena	—N/a	—N/a
27 July 2012	Kotka	Finland	Vellamo Maritime Centre	—N/a	—N/a
28 July 2012	Oulu	Finland	Qstock	—N/a	—N/a
17 August 2012	Bodø	Norway	Parkenfestivalen	—N/a	—N/a
18 August 2012	Ålesund	Norway	Jugendfest	—N/a	—N/a
North America
29 August 2012	Ottawa	Canada	Scotiabank Place	2,500 / 8,000	—N/a
30 August 2012	Toronto	Canada	Molson Canadian Amphitheatre	4,353 / 8,958	$255,523
31 August 2012	Montreal	Canada	Bell Centre	3,480 / 4,346	$231,485
2 September 2012	New York City	United States	Beacon Theatre	2,728 / 2,728	$204,232
4 September 2012	Boston	United States	House of Blues	—N/a	—N/a
7 September 2012	Winnipeg	Canada	MTS Centre	—N/a	—N/a
9 September 2012	Calgary	Canada	Scotiabank Saddledome	—N/a	—N/a
10 September 2012	Edmonton	Canada	Rexall Place	—N/a	—N/a
12 September 2012	Vancouver	Canada	Rogers Arena	—N/a	—N/a
14 September 2012	San Francisco	United States	Nob Hill Masonic Center	—N/a	—N/a
15 September 2012	Los Angeles	United States	Gibson Amphitheatre	—N/a	—N/a
Latin America
19 September 2012	Mexico City	Mexico	Auditorio Nacional	8,974 / 9,520	$403,680
Europe
6 April 2013	Kleine Scheidegg	Switzerland	SnowpenAir	9,000 / 9,000	—N/a
XXX – The 30th Anniversary Tour
North Asia and Europe
28 October 2014	Vladivostok	Russia	Fetisov Arena	—N/a	—N/a
30 October 2014	Khabarovsk	Russia	Platinum Arena	—N/a	—N/a
2 November 2014	Krasnoyarsk	Russia	Ivan Yarygin Sports Palace	—N/a	—N/a
4 November 2014	Novosibirsk	Russia	Novosibirsk Expo Centre	—N/a	—N/a
7 November 2014	Magnitogorsk	Russia	Arena Metallurg	—N/a	—N/a
9 November 2014	Yekaterinburg	Russia	Palace of Sports	—N/a	—N/a
12 November 2014	Saratov	Russia	Kristall Ice Sports Palace	—N/a	—N/a
14 November 2014	Rostov-on-Don	Russia	Palace of Sports	—N/a	—N/a
16 November 2014	Krasnodar	Russia	Basket-Hall Arena	—N/a	—N/a
19 November 2014	Saint Petersburg	Russia	Ice Palace	—N/a	—N/a
21 November 2014	Moscow	Russia	Crocus City Hall	—N/a	—N/a
23 November 2014	Tallinn	Estonia	Saku Suurhall	—N/a	—N/a
25 November 2014	Kaunas	Lithuania	Žalgiris Arena	—N/a	—N/a
28 November 2014	Helsinki	Finland	Hartwall Areena	—N/a	—N/a
29 November 2014	Turku	Finland	HK Areena	—N/a	—N/a
Australasia
7 February 2015	Auckland	New Zealand	Vector Arena	—N/a	—N/a
10 February 2015	Brisbane	Australia	Brisbane Entertainment Centre	—N/a	—N/a
14 February 2015	Perth	Australia	Perth Arena	8,951 / 9,235	$598,258
17 February 2015	Adelaide	Australia	Adelaide Entertainment Centre	—N/a	—N/a
20 February 2015	Melbourne	Australia	Rod Laver Arena	8,747 / 9,048	$559,866
21 February 2015	Coldstream	Australia	Rochford Wines	10,504 / 12,000	$883,402
23 February 2015	Wollongong	Australia	WIN Entertainment Centre	—N/a	—N/a
25 February 2015	Sydney	Australia	Sydney Opera House	—N/a	—N/a
27 February 2015	Sydney	Australia	Sydney Entertainment Centre	—N/a	—N/a
28 February 2015	Pokolbin	Australia	Bimbadgen Estate	8,000 / 8,000	$702,246
Europe
10 May 2015	Milan	Italy	Teatro degli Arcimboldi	—N/a	—N/a
13 May 2015	Madrid	Spain	Palacio Vistalegre	—N/a	—N/a
14 May 2015	Barcelona	Spain	Palau Sant Jordi	—N/a	—N/a
17 May 2015	Bucharest	Romania	Arenele Romane	—N/a	—N/a
19 May 2015	Budapest	Hungary	Budapest Sports Arena	—N/a	—N/a
21 May 2015	Prague	Czech Republic	O_{2} Arena	—N/a	—N/a
23 May 2015	Jelling	Denmark	Jelling Musikfestival	30,000 / 30,000	$304,540
26 May 2015	Paris	France	L'Olympia	—N/a	—N/a
27 May 2015	Amsterdam	Netherlands	Heineken Music Hall	—N/a	—N/a
29 May 2015	Antwerp	Belgium	Lotto Arena	6,689 / 7,348	$333,909
1 June 2015	Dublin	Ireland	3Arena	—N/a	—N/a
13 June 2015	Trondheim	Norway	Sverresborg	—N/a	—N/a
15 June 2015	Ostrava	Czech Republic	Čez Aréna	—N/a	—N/a
17 June 2015	Sofia	Bulgaria	Arena Armeec	—N/a	—N/a
22 June 2015	Warsaw	Poland	Torwar Hall	—N/a	—N/a
24 June 2015	Cologne	Germany	Lanxess Arena	—N/a	—N/a
25 June 2015	Hamburg	Germany	O_{2} World	6,205 / 10,367	$424,022
27 June 2015	Berlin	Germany	O_{2} World	9,823 / 10,949	$627,892
28 June 2015	Dresden	Germany	Elbwiesen	—N/a	—N/a
30 June 2015	Mannheim	Germany	SAP Arena	—N/a	—N/a
2 July 2015	Stuttgart	Germany	Porsche-Arena	—N/a	—N/a
3 July 2015	Bad Kissingen	Germany	Luitpoldpark	—N/a	—N/a
7 July 2015	Munich	Germany	Olympiahalle	—N/a	—N/a
8 July 2015	Vienna	Austria	Stadthalle	—N/a	—N/a
10 July 2015	Locarno	Switzerland	Moon and Stars Festival	—N/a	—N/a
11 July 2015	Zürich	Switzerland	Live at Sunset Festival	—N/a	—N/a
13 July 2015	London	United Kingdom	The O_{2} Arena	20,000 / 20,000	—N/a
18 July 2015	Kalmar	Sweden	Fredriksskans	—N/a	—N/a
22 July 2015	Halmstad	Sweden	Örjans Vall	—N/a	—N/a
24 July 2015	Gothenburg	Sweden	Slottsskogsvallen	—N/a	—N/a
25 July 2015	Stockholm	Sweden	Sjöhistoriska museet	—N/a	—N/a
27 July 2015	Rättvik	Sweden	Dalhalla	—N/a	—N/a
7 August 2015	Klaksvík	Faroe Islands	Summarfestivalurin	—N/a	—N/a
15 August 2015	Vaasa	Finland	Kaarlen kenttä	—N/a	—N/a
22 August 2015	Drammen	Norway	Drammen Elvefestival	—N/a	—N/a
South Africa
31 January 2016	Johannesburg	South Africa	Ticketpro Dome	—N/a	—N/a
2 February 2016	Durban	South Africa	ICC Arena	—N/a	—N/a
5 February 2016	Port Elizabeth	South Africa	Nelson Mandela Bay Stadium	—N/a	—N/a
7 February 2016	Cape Town	South Africa	Grand West Arena	—N/a	—N/a
8 February 2016	Cape Town	South Africa	Grand West Arena	—N/a	—N/a

== Cancelled or rescheduled shows ==
List of concerts, showing date, city, country, venue and reason for cancellation.
The Neverending World Tour
Date	City	Country	Venue	Reason
Charm School World Tour
18 March 2011	Tallinn	Estonia	Saku Suurhall	Fredriksson diagnosed with laryngitis.
1 April 2011	Mexico City	Mexico	Vive Cuervo Salón	Cancelled for unknown reason before tickets went on sale to the public.
Roxette Live: Travelling the World Tour
11 February 2012	Auckland	New Zealand	Vector Arena	Gessle diagnosed with mystery illness on flight from Stockholm.
18 April 2012	Bogotá	Colombia	Simón Bolívar Park	Cancelled for unknown reason before tickets went on sale to the public.
4 May 2012	Asunción	Paraguay	Rakiura Resort	Scheduling conflict.
21 July 2012	Brøndby	Denmark	Svanholm Park	Logistical issues.
3 September 2012	Boston	United States	Orpheum Theatre	Moved to House of Blues.
XXX – The 30th Anniversary Tour
5 July 2015	Mainz	Germany	Nordmole Zollhafen	Technical difficulties.
3 June 2016	Murten	Switzerland	Stars of Sounds Festival	Fredriksson ordered by doctors to stop touring.
18 June 2016	Jyväskylä	Finland	Sataman Yö Festival	Fredriksson ordered by doctors to stop touring.
30 June 2016	Bratislava	Slovakia	Ondrej Nepela Arena	Fredriksson ordered by doctors to stop touring.
2 July 2016	Klam	Austria	Burg Clam	Fredriksson ordered by doctors to stop touring.
8 July 2016	London	United Kingdom	Old Royal Naval College	Fredriksson ordered by doctors to stop touring.
10 July 2016	Weert	Netherlands	Bospop	Fredriksson ordered by doctors to stop touring.
15 July 2016	Mönchengladbach	Germany	SparkassenPark	Fredriksson ordered by doctors to stop touring.
19 July 2016	Halle	Germany	Freilichtbühne Peißnitz	Fredriksson ordered by doctors to stop touring.
21 July 2016	Berlin	Germany	Zitadelle	Fredriksson ordered by doctors to stop touring.
23 July 2016	Emmendingen	Germany	Schloßplatz	Fredriksson ordered by doctors to stop touring.
29 July 2016	Knutsford	United Kingdom	Tatton Park	Fredriksson ordered by doctors to stop touring.
31 July 2016	Tienen	Belgium	Suikerrock Festival	Fredriksson ordered by doctors to stop touring.
9 September 2016	Saint Petersburg	Russia	Ice Palace	Fredriksson ordered by doctors to stop touring.
11 September 2016	Moscow	Russia	Crocus City Hall	Fredriksson ordered by doctors to stop touring.

== Personnel ==
Information derived from "Roxette Live: XXX – The 30th Anniversary Tour" book.

Musicians

- Marie Fredriksson – vocals
- Per Gessle – vocals, rhythm and acoustic guitars, harmonica
- Per "Pelle" Alsing – drums and percussion
- Magnus Börjson – bass and backing vocals
- Malin Ekstrand – backing vocals and percussion (2010 dates)
- Helena Josefsson – backing vocals and percussion (2009 and 2011 dates)
- Christoffer Lundquist – lead guitar
- Dea Norberg – backing vocals and percussion (2012, 2014, 2015 and 2016 dates)
- Clarence Öfwerman – keyboards

Management

- Mikael Bolyos – personal assistant to Marie Fredriksson
- Adam Bassett – lighting designer (2014 dates onwards)
- Calle Brattberg – lighting designer (2011 and 2012 dates)
- Marie Dimberg – artist management
- Åsa Elmgren – wardrobe
- Tumppi Haaranen – assistant tour manager
- Smick Hall-Hardgrave – pre-production manager
- Bo Johansson – tour manager and coordinator for Live Nation Entertainment
- Jakob Johnzén – backline
- Robert Kelber – lighting director and programming (2014 dates onwards)
- Micke Lindström – production manager
- Mats Nilemar – business management
- Mikael Noguiera-Svensson – backline
- Åsa Nordin-Gessle – personal assistant to Per Gessle
- Patrick Woodroffe – lighting designer (2014 dates onwards)

Production

- Abbe Ahlbin – sound technician
- Elin Arnelöv – truck driver
- Lottie Bremerhag – truck driver
- Mathias Gerstmann – bus driver
- Lars Jedermark – rigging
- Per Johansson – pilot
- Thomas Johansson – tour producer for Live Nation Entertainment
- Lucas Lindholm – lighting technician
- Sam Pattinson – video content (2014 dates onwards)
- Gerth Pettersson – sound technician
- Bebban Pihlblad – lighting technician
- Mikael Sandelius – truck driver
- Fredrik Stormby – lighting technician
- Tina Vestin – travel arrangements
- Mattias Vidberg – truck driver
- Helli Windisch – bus driver

== Opening acts ==
- Darren Hayes – 2011 London show
- 1927 – 2012 Australian shows
- Hesta Prynn – 2012 New York show
- Mim Grey – 2012 Manchester show
- Glass Tiger – 2012 Canadian shows
- Boom Crash Opera – 2015 Australian shows
- Dragon – 2015 Australian shows
- Eurogliders – 2015 Australian shows
- Eskobar – 2015 European shows
