= Charm School (Roxette album) =

Studio album by Roxette
- Released: 11 February 2011
- Recorded: May 2009 – September 2010
- Venue: 40:51
- Studios: Tits & Ass, Halmstad; The Aerosol Grey Machine, Vallarum; Atlantis, Stockholm, Sweden
- Genre: Power pop
- Labels: Roxette Recordings; Capitol
- Producers: Christoffer Lundquist; Clarence Öfwerman; Per Gessle

Roxette chronology
The Rox Box/Roxette 86–06 (2006)	Charm School (2011)	Travelling (2012)

Singles from Charm School
- 1. "She's Got Nothing On (But the Radio)" Released: 10 January 2011; 2. "Speak to Me" Released: 18 April 2011; 3. "Way Out" Released: 10 June 2011

Charm School is the eighth studio album by Swedish pop duo Roxette, released on 11 February 2011 by Roxette Recordings and Capitol. It was their first studio album since 2001's Room Service, and their first since vocalist Marie Fredriksson's brain tumour diagnosis in 2002. "She's Got Nothing On (But the Radio)" preceded the album as its lead single, which became the duo's highest-peaking single in almost two decades in territories such as Austria, Germany and Switzerland. The song also entered Billboard's Adult Contemporary Chart—making Roxette the only duo who appeared on that chart in the 1980s, 1990s, 2000s and 2010s.

The album received mixed reviews, particularly from the Swedish press, who criticised it for being too similar to the band's earlier work, although others commended it for mixing various styles from throughout their discography. International reception was more positive; it was chosen as BBC Radio 2's 'Album of the Week'. The record was a commercial success upon release, becoming their first number one album since the early 1990s in countries such as Germany and Switzerland. It was certified gold in the Czech Republic, Russia, Sweden and Switzerland, and platinum in Germany. Within a year of release, the album sold over of 500,000 copies worldwide.

On 28 November 2011, the record was re-released as Charm School Revisited, with a bonus disc containing demo versions of every song from the album, plus remixes of "She's Got Nothing On (But the Radio)" and subsequent single "Speak to Me". "Way Out" was also released as a single, while "No One Makes It on Her Own" was issued as a promotional single. The album was promoted by "The Neverending World Tour", which ran until 2016, when Fredriksson was advised by doctors to cease touring activity due to poor health.

== Background ==
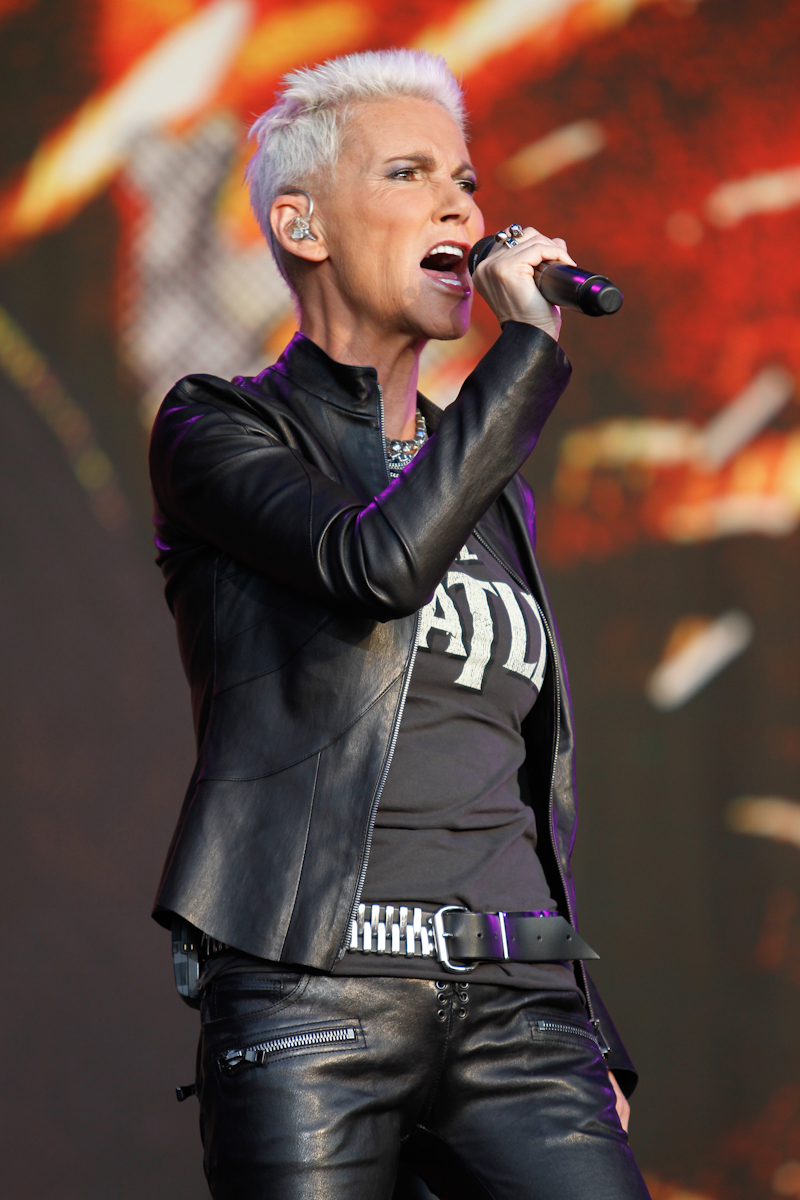
Marie Fredriksson performing at Bospop in the Netherlands on 9 July 2011

Roxette released their seventh studio album, Room Service, in 2001, and it was promoted by their first concert tour in six years. On 11 September 2002, vocalist Marie Fredriksson collapsed in her bathroom; the impact of the fall fractured her cranium, and she had an epileptic seizure. MRI scans indicated she had a brain tumour in the back of her head. The diagnosis led to the cancellation of Roxette's planned performance at the 2002 Night of the Proms concert series. After waiting several weeks for the fracture to subside, she underwent successful surgery to remove the malignant tumour, followed by months of chemotherapy and radiation treatment. Fredriksson was unable to speak for a considerable period of time afterward, remained unable to read, and was left blind in one eye; she also had limited hearing and mobility.

Despite this, she collaborated with her husband Mikael Bolyos to release two solo albums over the proceeding years: The Change in 2004 and Min bäste vän – an album of Swedish covers – in 2006. Roxette's other permanent member, Per Gessle, also released several critically and commercially successful solo albums during this period, including Mazarin (2003) and Son of a Plumber (2005), as well as Gyllene Tider's Finn 5 fel! (2004). All of Gessle's albums were produced by him alongside collaborators Clarence Öfwerman and Christoffer Lundquist. In June 2006, Roxette, together with Öfwerman and Lundquist, reconvened to record two new songs – "One Wish" and "Reveal" – for their greatest hits compilation A Collection of Roxette Hits: Their 20 Greatest Songs!. Following this, Fredriksson featured as a guest vocalist on multiple tracks of Bolyos' collaborative album A Family Affair, released in June 2007, and issued the compilation Tid för tystnad – Marie Fredrikssons ballader five months later, as well as the non-album single "Där du andas" in 2008. Later that year, she took part in the "Stjärnklart" series of concerts, which saw her performing an abbreviated set alongside other vocalists in Swedish concert halls. She also curated exhibitions of her artwork in Stockholm and Gothenburg, while Gessle released two more solo albums: En händig man in 2007 and Party Crasher in 2008.

On the 4 May 2009 date of Gessle's "Party Crasher Tour" in Amsterdam, he and his band were joined on-stage by Fredriksson to perform renditions of "The Look" and "It Must Have Been Love". Immediately after this gig, Gessle announced to Swedish publication Aftonbladet that Roxette would perform at the 2009 edition of Night of the Proms, which began on 23 October 2009 and consisted of 42 dates in Belgium, Germany and the Netherlands. On the same date that this tour began, Swedish newspaper Expressen reported that Roxette were recording new songs, with Gessle confirming that he had been working on material for a new Roxette album since May 2009.

== Recording and production ==
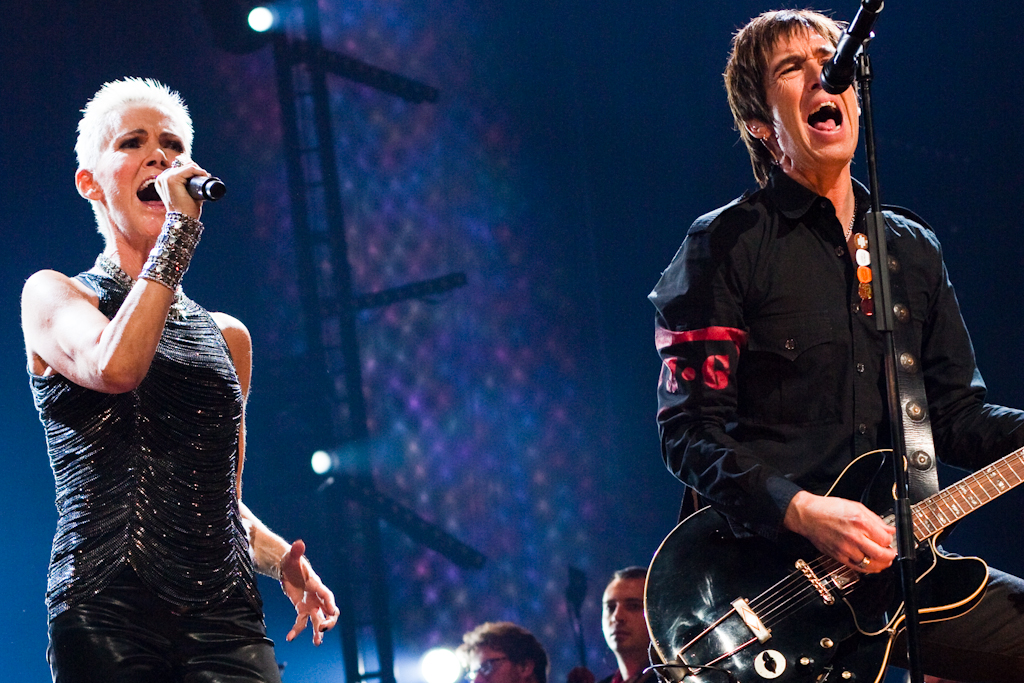
Roxette performing at the GelreDome in Arnhem on 13 November 2009

Sixteen songs were recorded for Charm School, twelve of which appear on the album. Gessle and his Gyllene Tider bandmate Mats "M.P." Persson recorded demos for the album at their Tits & Ass recording studio in Halmstad between 2009 and 2011, with the exception of "Happy On the Outside", which was demoed in August 2005. Backing tracks were recorded in Christoffer Lundquist's converted barn studio in Vallarum in the south of Sweden – The Aerosol Grey Machine – while Fredriksson's vocals were recorded in Atlantis Studios in Stockholm. Gessle's intention with the album was to "re-create the classic Rox[ette] sound, without being too nostalgic. There are certain interesting things happening when Marie and I start to sing together. We love that. But we don't want to repeat ourselves too much." Every song on the record was composed solely by Gessle, making it the first Roxette studio album to not feature writing contributions from either Fredriksson or Persson. Despite this, Gessle said of "No One Makes It on Her Own": "I wrote it with the intention of Marie singing it, but when she did [start singing the lyric] I thought, 'Wow! This is spot on!'. Marie was really telling the story of her life, and that was all done subconsciously. I hadn't thought of that. [She] really made that song [her] own."

The album does not include a title track; "Charm School" later appeared on the duo's next studio album, Travelling (2012), under the title "Touched By the Hand of God". (Note: "This was the title track of Roxette's Charm School album but it never made the record. I wrote it in September 2009 and it felt really good, but the Roxette version didn't come out right. So we partly re-recorded it for the Travelling album with a different production angle. I gave it a new title ["Touched By the Hand of God"] and it became a single. I've said it before and I say it again: songs move in mysterious ways..." — Gessle, Songs, Sketches & Reflections: The English Part.) Several songs contained on the album were originally written several decades before they were released. "Only When I Dream" was written in 1998 and first recorded during sessions for the duo's 1999 album Have a Nice Day. "In My Own Way" and the chorus of album closer "Sitting on Top of the World" were written in the early 1980s. "In My Own Way" had previously been recorded by two other artists. In 1989, a Swedish version of the song – titled "En gång i livet" ("Once in a Lifetime") – had been released as the title track to a studio album by singer-songwriter Niklas Strömstedt. An English version of the song would later appear on country singer Jill Johnson's 1996 album Sugartree.

== Release and promotion ==
"She's Got Nothing On (But the Radio)" preceded the album as its lead single when it was released in January 2011. The song became a substantial hit in continental Europe, and was their most successful single in Germany since 1992's "How Do You Do!", where it peaked at number ten and spent over five months on the German Singles Chart. It peaked at number nine in Austria, making it their highest-peaking single there since 1994's "Sleeping in My Car". The song reached number nineteen in Switzerland—their highest-peaking single in that country since "Wish I Could Fly" in 1999. It also peaked at number 30 on Billboard's Adult Contemporary Chart, making Roxette the only duo to appear on that chart during each of the last four consecutive decades.

The album was issued on CD and vinyl formats – and via online music stores such as iTunes – throughout Europe from 11 February 2011, with a release in the United Kingdom following on 28 March, and in the United States in July. Deluxe CD editions of the album included a bonus disc of 12 live tracks, recorded in Saint Petersburg, Halmstad and Stavanger during their 2010 tour. "Speak to Me" and "Way Out" were issued as subsequent singles, although they both failed to appear on any international sales charts, peaking instead on numerous airplay charts. "No One Makes It on Her Own" was issued as a promotional single in late 2011, while an animated music video created by fan Tanya Rush became the song's official video when it was uploaded to the band's YouTube channel.

On 28 November 2011, the album was re-released under the title Charm School Revisited. This edition included a bonus disc containing demo recordings of every song on the original album, plus remixes of "Speak to Me" and "She's Got Nothing On (But the Radio)" by Bassflow, Adrian Lux and Adam Rickfors. The record was promoted by the "Charm School World Tour", a leg of the long-running concert series "The Neverending World Tour", which ran until 2016 when Fredriksson was advised by her doctors to cease all touring activity due to poor health.

== Critical reception ==
Professional ratings
Review scores
Source	Rating
AllMusic	3.5/5 stars
BBC Music	(positive)
Classic Rock	2.5/5 stars
Dagens Nyheter	3/5 stars
Expressen	2/5 stars
Göteborgs-Posten	2/5 stars
Laut.de	3/5 stars
Östgöta Correspondenten	4/5 stars
musicOMH	2/5 stars
Svenska Dagbladet	1/5 stars

The album received mixed reviews from the Swedish press. Anders Nunstedt from Expressen described it as "a clear return to the successful sound from when Roxette's name was recognisable all over the world. Just a little more boring, and without the previous charm." He summarised his review by saying: "Charm School is typical, middle-of-the-road pop at 70 km/h with no specific destination. Consistent, but not adventurous. If you've heard three songs, you've heard the whole record." This sentiment was echoed by Västerbottens Folkblad, who wrote that it contained "the same straight and easily accessible pop that made them famous all over the world. With the difference now that it is a little less compelling." They also criticised the record for an absence of obvious hit singles, as did the Göteborgs-Posten, who complained that "above all, the music feels dated. With a few exceptions, it sounds like the Roxette I remember from 1991." Svenska Dagbladet gave a scathing review, scoring the album one star and writing: "Often I found myself thinking about how there is too much pop music, to ever be able to find a single reason for this album's existence."

Dagens Nyheter was more positive, calling the album "impressive". Ulf Gustavsson from Upsala Nya Tidning commended Charm School for mixing various styles from Roxette's discography, from the "early power pop model 'The Look', and also their less popular but musically more adventurous mid-term, as well as drawing on Per Gessle's romantic psychedelia on [his] solo project, Son of a Plumber." He went on to call it one of Roxette's best albums while praising Fredriksson's vocals. Although they gave the album a mixed review, a writer for Nöjesguiden also complimented Fredriksson's voice, highlighting "I'm Glad You Called" as the album's best song; they were critical of Gessle's singing, saying the record would have been better had Fredriksson sang lead vocals on every track. Östgöta Correspondenten praised Gessle's songwriting for incorporating elements of 1960s rock and roll, 1970s R&B and other contemporary influences.

Conversely, the album's international reception was generally positive. It was chosen as BBC Radio 2's 'Album of the Week' for the week commencing 21 March 2011. It received a positive review from BBC Music critic Chris Roberts, who commented: "Charm School is loaded with punchy, hook-riddled anthems that can only be described as absolute belters. From the opening surge of 'Way Out', a sonic sibling to Joan Jett's 'I Love Rock 'n' Roll' only even bigger, louder and dumber, this album consummately achieves its goals and then some." Brandon Veevers of Renowned for Sound called the album "a truly inspiring collection of all that we love about Roxette." The AU Review gave a mixed review, writing that the album "is, sporadically, as advertised: charming in sections, but barely as charming as that which we've come to expect from the duo." Stephen Thomas Erlewine from AllMusic wrote: "Roxette may be a band out of time on Charm School but, well, that's their charm: they're still unapologetically big pop, they still celebrate melody over everything else." Spin magazine rated Charm School the 15th best pop album of 2011.

== Commercial performance ==
The record performed well commercially upon release, topping the charts in numerous territories including the Czech Republic, Germany and Switzerland. The album was certified gold in each of these countries, indicating shipments in excess of 5,000, 100,000 and 15,000 units respectively. The record spent over six months on the German Albums Chart, and by the release of Roxette's next studio album, Travelling, the following year, Charm School had been certified platinum by the Bundesverband Musikindustrie for shipments of over 200,000 copies. It ended 2011 as the 26th best-selling album in the country, and was the 19th best-selling album of the year in neighbouring Switzerland.

It also performed well in the duo's native Sweden, peaking at number two and eventually being certified gold by the Swedish Recording Industry Association for shipments in excess of 20,000 units. It peaked at number two in Austria as well, and finished 2011 as the 56th best-selling album in that country. The album also performed well internationally, peaking within the top twenty in Denmark, Greece, Hungary, Poland, Russia and Spain. It peaked at number 49 on the ARIA Charts to become Roxette's first top fifty studio album in Australia since 1994's Crash! Boom! Bang!. However, Charm School underperformed in the United Kingdom, where it peaked at number 122. As of January 2012, the record has sold over half a million copies worldwide.

== Track listing ==
All tracks are written by Per Gessle, except where noted.

No.	Title	Length
1.	"Way Out"	2:44
2.	"No One Makes It on Her Own"	3:42
3.	"She's Got Nothing On (But the Radio)"	3:34
4.	"Speak to Me"	3:42
5.	"I'm Glad You Called"	2:48
6.	"Only When I Dream"	3:50
7.	"Dream On"	3:09
8.	"Big Black Cadillac"	3:05
9.	"In My Own Way"	3:30
10.	"After All"	3:15
11.	"Happy on the Outside"	3:37
12.	"Sitting on Top of the World"	3:55
Total length:		40:51

Charm School – iTunes edition (bonus track)
No.	Title	Length
13.	"It Must Have Been Love" (Live on 12 September 2010 at the Ice Palace in Saint Petersburg, Russia)	6:01
Total length:		46:52

Charm School – Deluxe edition (bonus disc)
No.	Title	Writer(s)	Length
1.	"Dressed for Success" (Live on 12 September 2010 at the Ice Palace in Saint Petersburg)		4:36
2.	"Sleeping in My Car" (Live on 21 August 2010 at Vistestranden in Stavanger, Norway)		3:41
3.	"Wish I Could Fly" (Live on 12 September 2010 at the Ice Palace in Saint Petersburg)		4:51
4.	"7Twenty7" (Live on 14 August 2010 at Marknadsplatsen in Halmstad, Sweden)		3:57
5.	"Perfect Day" (Live on 12 September 2010 at the Ice Palace in Saint Petersburg)	Gessle; Mats Persson	3:19
6.	"Things Will Never Be the Same" (Live on 12 September 2010 at the Ice Palace in Saint Petersburg)		3:00
7.	"How Do You Do!" / "Dangerous" (Live on 21 August 2010 at Vistestranden in Stavanger)		6:55
8.	"Silver Blue" (Live on 12 September 2010 at the Ice Palace in Saint Petersburg)		5:10
9.	"Joyride" (Live on 12 September 2010 at the Ice Palace in Saint Petersburg)		4:27
10.	"Listen to Your Heart" (Live on 12 September 2010 at the Ice Palace in Saint Petersburg)	Gessle; Persson	5:46
11.	"The Look" (Live on 14 August 2010 at Marknadsplatsen in Halmstad)		6:23
12.	"Church of Your Heart" (Live on 12 September 2010 at the Ice Palace in Saint Petersburg)		4:07
Total length:			56:12

Charm School Revisited (bonus disc)
No.	Title	Length
1.	"Way Out" (Tits & Ass Demo) (25 January 2010)	2:22
2.	"No One Makes It on Her Own" (Tits & Ass Demo) (26 July 2010)	3:18
3.	"She's Got Nothing On (But the Radio)" (Tits & Ass Demo) (7 August 2009)	2:30
4.	"Speak to Me" (Tits & Ass Demo) (13 July 2010)	3:33
5.	"I'm Glad You Called" (Live demo recorded at The Westin Hotel in Rotterdam, Netherlands) (19 November 2009)	2:40
6.	"Only When I Dream" (Tits & Ass Demo) (7 August 2009)	3:33
7.	"Dream On" (Tits & Ass Demo) (25 January 2010)	2:53
8.	"Big Black Cadillac" (Tits & Ass Demo) (2 July 2010)	3:02
9.	"In My Own Way" (Tits & Ass Demo) (7 August 2009)	2:52
10.	"After All" (Tits & Ass Demo) (27 July 2010)	3:22
11.	"Happy on the Outside" (Tits & Ass Demo) (17 August 2005)	2:57
12.	"Sitting on Top of the World" (Tits & Ass Demo) (13 July 2010)	2:45
13.	"Speak to Me" (Bassflow Remake)	3:37
14.	"She's Got Nothing On (But the Radio)" (Adam Rickfors Remix) (Radio Edit)	3:28
15.	"She's Got Nothing On (But the Radio)" (Adrian Lux Remix) (Original Version)	5:34
Total length:		48:26

== Personnel ==
Credits adapted from the liner notes of Charm School.

- Roxette are Per Gessle and Marie Fredriksson
- Recorded at Tits & Ass Studio in Halmstad, The Aerosol Grey Machine in Vallarum and Atlantis Studio in Stockholm, Sweden between May 2010 and September 2011
- All songs mixed by Ronny Lahti, except tracks 3, 4, 8 and 12 by Christoffer Lundquist
- Mastered by Tom Coyne at Sterling Sound Studios, New York City

Musicians

- Marie Fredriksson – lead and background vocals
- Per Gessle – lead and background vocals, guitars, record producer
- Jens Jansson – drums
- Christoffer Lundquist – bass, guitars, keyboards, programming, engineering, production, string arrangements
- Clarence Öfwerman – keyboards, programming, production, string arrangements

Additional musicians and technical personnel

- Mikael Bolyos – photography
- Emil Carlsson – violin
- Marie Dimberg – artist management
- Tomas Ebrelius – violin
- Gabriel Gessle – photography
- Lennart Haglund – assistant studio engineer
- Ulf Magnusson – photography
- Ekaterina Melinkaya – photography
- Mats Nilemar – business management
- Mats "M.P." Persson – demo recording engineer
- Important Pete – photography
- Lotta Weber Sjöholm – cello
- Johanna Skoglund – viola
- Pär Wickholm – album cover and sleeve design

== Charts ==
=== Weekly charts ===
Chart (2011)	Peak; position
Australian Albums (ARIA)	49
Austrian Albums (Ö3 Austria)	2
Belgian Albums (Ultratop Flanders)	27
Belgian Albums (Ultratop Wallonia)	57
Czech Albums (ČNS IFPI)	1
Danish Albums (Hitlisten)	11
Dutch Albums (Album Top 100)	21
Finnish Albums (Suomen virallinen lista)	22
German Albums (Offizielle Top 100)	1
Greek Albums (IFPI Greece)	15
Hungarian Albums (MAHASZ)	16
Italian Albums (FIMI)	45
Norwegian Albums (VG-lista)	26
Polish Albums (ZPAV)	16
Russian Albums (2M)	8
Spanish Albums (Promusicae)	14
Swedish Albums (Sverigetopplistan)	2
Swiss Albums (Schweizer Hitparade)	1
UK Albums (OCC)	122

=== Year-end charts ===
Chart (2011)	Position
Austrian Albums (Ö3 Austria)	56
German Albums (GfK)	26
Swedish Albums (Sverigetopplistan)	24
Swiss Albums (Schweizer Hitparade)	19

== Certifications ==
Region	Certification	Certified units/sales
Czech Republic (ČNS IFPI)	Gold	5,000^{^}
Germany (BVMI)	Platinum	200,000^{^}
Russia (NFPF)	Gold	5,000^{*}
Sweden (GLF)	Gold	20,000^{‡}
Switzerland (IFPI Switzerland)	Gold	15,000^{^}
Summaries
Worldwide		500,000
^{*} Sales figures based on certification alone.^{^} Shipments figures based on certification alone.^{‡} Sales+streaming figures based on certification alone.

== Release history ==
Region	Date	Format	Edition(s)	Label	Catalog #	Ref.
Europe	11 February 2011	CD; vinyl; digital download	Standard; deluxe bonus disc	Roxette Recordings; Capitol	50999 071427–2 7	
United Kingdom	28 March 2011	CD; vinyl; digital download	Standard; deluxe bonus disc	Roxette Recordings; Capitol	50999 071427–2 7	
United States	26 July 2011	Digital download	Standard; deluxe bonus disc	Roxette Recordings; Capitol	50999 071427–2 7	
Europe	21 November 2011	CD; digital download	Charm School Revisited	Roxette Recordings; Capitol	50999 091594–2 6	
