= Speak to Me (Roxette song) =

Single by Roxette

from the album Charm School
- Released: 18 April 2011
- Recorded: July–October 2010
- Studio: Various: Tits & Ass Studio, Halmstad; The Aerosol Grey Machine, Vallarum; Atlantis Studios, Stockholm
- Genre: Electropop; alternative rock
- Length: 3:42
- Label: Roxette Recordings; Capitol
- Songwriter: Per Gessle
- Producers: Christoffer Lundquist; Clarence Öfwerman; Gessle

Roxette singles chronology
"She's Got Nothing On (But the Radio)" (2011)	"Speak to Me" (2011)	"Way Out" (2011)

Music video
- "Speak to Me" on YouTube

"Speak to Me" is a song by Swedish pop music duo Roxette, released on 18 April 2011 as the second commercial single from their eighth studio album, Charm School. The single version of the track was a remix created by Swedish producer Bassflow. The song was released internationally, excluding in Germany and Austria, where "Way Out" was released as the second and final single from the album. The track failed to appear on any international sales charts, although it peaked in the top twenty of Finland's Radiosoittolista chart, and also entered the Russian TopHit chart. The music video was directed by Mikael Sandberg.

== Formats and track listings ==
All songs written by Per Gessle.

- Download
1. "Speak to Me" (Bassflow Remake) – 3:35
2. "Stars" (Live at Palau Sant Jordi in Barcelona, Spain on 24 October 2001) – 4:07
- Promo CD
1. "Speak to Me" (Original Mix) – 3:42
2. "Speak to Me" (Bassflow Remake) – 3:35
3. "Speak to Me" (Bassflow Remake) (Instrumental) – 3:35
- CD single (50999 029732–7 1)
1. "Speak to Me" (Bassflow Remake) – 3:35
2. "Speak to Me" (Original Mix) – 3:42
3. "Stars" (Live from Barcelona) – 4:07
- 7" single (50999 029732–7 2)
1. "Speak to Me" (Bassflow Remake) – 3:35
2. "Speak to Me" (Original Mix) – 3:42
3. "She's Got Nothing On (But the Radio)" (Adrian Lux Mix) – 5:34
4. "She's Got Nothing On (But the Radio)" (Adam Rickfors Mix) – 3:30

== Personnel ==
Credits adapted from the liner notes of Charm School Revisited.

- Demo recorded at Tits & Ass Studio in Halmstad, Sweden on 13 July 2010
- Backing track and Per Gessle's vocals recorded at The Aerosol Grey Machine in Vallarum, Sweden in August 2010
- Marie Fredriksson's vocals recorded at Atlantis Studio in Stockholm, Sweden in October 2010

Musicians

- Marie Fredriksson – lead and background vocals
- Per Gessle – lead and background vocals, production
- Peter Boström – additional production and remixing (Bassflow version only)
- Tom Coyne – mastering (at Sterling Sound Studios, New York City)
- Christoffer Lundquist – bass, guitars, keyboards, programming, engineering, production and mixing
- Clarence Öfwerman – keyboards, programming and production
- Mats "M.P." Persson – engineering (demo version only)

== Charts ==
Chart (2011)	Peak position
Finnish Airplay (Radiosoittolista)	18
Polish Airplay (ZPAV)	3
Russian Airplay (TopHit)	168
