= She's Got Nothing On (But the Radio) =

Single by Roxette

from the album Charm School
- Released: 10 January 2011
- Recorded: August 2009 – September 2010
- Studio: Various: Tits & Ass Studio, Halmstad; The Aerosol Grey Machine, Vallarum; Atlantis Studios, Stockholm
- Genre: Rock; electropop
- Length: 3:34
- Label: Roxette Recordings; Capitol
- Songwriter: Per Gessle
- Producers: Christoffer Lundquist; Clarence Öfwerman; Gessle

Roxette singles chronology
"Reveal" (2007)	"She's Got Nothing On (But the Radio)" (2011)	"Speak to Me" (2011)

Music video
- "She's Got Nothing On (But the Radio)" on YouTube

"She's Got Nothing On (But the Radio)" is a song by Swedish pop music duo Roxette, released on 10 January 2011 as the lead single from their eighth studio album, Charm School. An uptempo rock and electropop song, the track received a mixed response from both fans and critics. Despite this, it went on to become a substantial hit for the duo throughout mainland Europe. It was their most successful single since 1992's "How Do You Do!" in territories such as Austria and Germany, and also peaked within the top thirty of numerous airplay charts: including Billboard's Adult Contemporary Chart. This made Roxette the only duo who have appeared on that chart during each of the last four consecutive decades.

== Composition and style ==
"She's Got Nothing On (But the Radio)"
30-second sample of the song's first verse and chorus

"She's Got Nothing On (But the Radio)" was written by Per Gessle, and produced by the songwriter alongside Christoffer Lundquist and Clarence Öfwerman. Its backing track was recorded in The Aerosol Grey Machine, Lundquist's converted barn studio in Vallarum, Scania; Marie Fredriksson's vocals were recorded in Atlantis Studios in Stockholm. The song runs for a duration of three minutes and 34 seconds. According to Ultimate Guitar, it is a rock and electropop song with a tempo of 132 beats per minute. Each verse consists of two repetitions of an A–A–G–D–A sequence, followed by a chorus composed of Dm–B♭–F–C–Dm–B♭–F–C–B♭–Dm, while the bridge is made up of three short progressions of Dm–C.

The title is a reference to a 1952 quote by Marilyn Monroe regarding her nude photographs for a calendar: "It's not true I had nothing on. I had the radio on." The band Pantera used the same phrase for the title of their song "Nothin' On (But the Radio)" on their 1983 debut album Metal Magic. In 2004, country music artist Gary Allan released "Nothing On but the Radio". It was reported in 2010 that Lady Gaga had recorded an unreleased song under the title "Nothing On (But the Radio)".

The track received a mixed response from both fans and critics. Gessle argued: "I've been writing songs for more than 35 years. If I should listen to the A&R guys, the reporters or the fans, I might as well give up. I have to trust my personal instincts and beliefs and do it my own way. With [Charm School], we've tried to re-create the classic [Roxette] sound, without being too nostalgic. There are certain interesting things happening when Marie and I start to sing together. We love that. But we don't want to repeat ourselves too much."

== Release and promotion ==
The song was released as a one-track digital single from 10 January 2011. The music video was uploaded onto Vevo two days later. It was directed by Mats Udd, and consists of footage of Fredriksson and Gessle performing the song during its chorus, with footage of a party accompanying the verses and the outro. As of 2018, the video has received over 2.5 million views on YouTube. A two-track CD single followed from 15 February, featuring a live version of "Wish I Could Fly" as the b-side. This live version of the b-side was taken from the band's performance on 12 September 2010 at the Saint Petersburg Ice Palace in Russia, and is the same version of the song which appeared as a bonus track on deluxe editions of Charm School. A maxi single containing five remixed versions of "She's Got Nothing On (But the Radio)" by Adrian Lux and Adam Rickfors was released from 25 February. In the United Kingdom, the song was A-listed on BBC Radio 2 for the week commencing 5 March, and remained there until 2 April. In the United States, it was serviced to adult contemporary radio formats from 20 June.

== Commercial performance ==
The track became a substantial hit in central Europe. It entered the top ten and spent a total of 21 weeks on the German Singles Chart, becoming both their highest-peaking and longest-charting single there since 1992's "How Do You Do!". It also peaked at number 6 on the German Airplay Chart. The song reached number 9 and spent fifteen weeks on the Ö3 Austria Top 40, and was the duo's highest-peaking single there since "Sleeping in My Car" in 1994, and their longest-charting since "How Do You Do!". It peaked at number 19 on the Swiss Hitparade, making it their first top twenty hit in Switzerland since "Wish I Could Fly" in 1999. The song also became a top forty hit on the Flemish edition of the Belgian Ultratop 50 chart.

"She's Got Nothing On (But the Radio)" also performed well on numerous airplay charts. It peaked within the top ten of the Hungarian Airplay Chart, and reached number 26 on the UK Airplay Chart. The song spent 39 weeks on the Czech Republic's Hot 100 Airplay Chart, peaking at number 30. It also peaked at number 30 on Billboard's Adult Contemporary Chart. This made Roxette the only duo who have appeared on that chart during each of the last four consecutive decades.

== Formats and track listings ==
All songs written by Per Gessle.

- Digital download (CDPRO–4439 · 50999 072004–2 7)
1. "She's Got Nothing On (But the Radio)" – 3:34
- CD single (50999 072005–2 6)
1. "She's Got Nothing On (But the Radio)" – 3:34
2. "Wish I Could Fly" (Live at the Ice Palace in Saint Petersburg, Russia on 12 September 2010) – 4:51
- Maxi single − Remixes
1. "She's Got Nothing On (But the Radio)" (Adrian Lux Remix) (Original Version) – 5:34
2. "She's Got Nothing On (But the Radio)" (Adrian Lux Remix) (Radio Edit) – 2:41
3. "She's Got Nothing On (But the Radio)" (Adam Rickfors Remix) (Radio Edit) – 3:36
4. "She's Got Nothing On (But the Radio)" (Adam Rickfors Remix) (Dub Edit) – 7:23
5. "She's Got Nothing On (But the Radio)" (Adam Rickfors Remix) (Power Edit) – 3:29

== Personnel ==
Credits adapted from the liner notes of Charm School Revisited.

- Demo recorded at Tits & Ass Studio in Halmstad, Sweden on 7 August 2009
- Backing track and Per Gessle's vocals recorded at The Aerosol Grey Machine in Vallarum, Sweden in February 2010
- Marie Fredriksson's vocals recorded at Atlantis Studio in Stockholm, Sweden in September 2010

Musicians

- Marie Fredriksson – lead and background vocals
- Per Gessle – lead and background vocals and production
- Tom Coyne – mastering (at Sterling Sound Studios, New York City)
- Christoffer Lundquist – bass, guitars, keyboards, programming, engineering, production and mixing
- Clarence Öfwerman – keyboards, programming and production

== Charts ==
=== Weekly charts ===
Chart (2011)	Peak position
Austria (Ö3 Austria Top 40)	9
Belgium (Ultratop 50 Flanders)	34
Czech Republic Airplay (ČNS IFPI)	30
Germany (GfK)	10
German Airplay (Nielsen)	6
Hungary (Rádiós Top 40)	9
Polish Airplay (ZPAV)	1
Russian Airplay (Tophit)	148
Switzerland (Schweizer Hitparade)	19
Spain (Promusicae)	41
UK Airplay (OCC)	26
US Adult Contemporary (Billboard)	30

=== Year-end charts ===
Chart (2011)	Position
German Singles (GfK)	71
Hungarian Airplay (Rádiós Top 40)	38

== Release history ==
Region	Date	Format	Ref.
Europe	10 January 2011	1-track single	
Europe	15 February 2011	2-track single	
Europe	25 February 2011	Maxi single	
United States	20 June 2011	Airplay	
