= Live-Ism =

Video by Roxette
- Released: 21 August 1992
- Recorded: Sydney Entertainment Centre, Australia on 13 December 1991
- Genre: Rock; pop
- Length: 77 minutes (approximate)
- Language: English
- Label: EMI; Picture Music International
- Director: Wayne Isham; Jeff Richter
- Producer: Curt Marvis; Jeff Tannebring

Roxette chronology
The Videos (1991)	Live-Ism (1992)	Don't Bore Us, Get to the Chorus! – Roxette's Greatest Video Hits (1995)

Live-Ism is the third concert film by Swedish pop music duo Roxette, released on 21 August 1992 on VHS and LaserDisc formats by Picture Music International and EMI. It contains a shortened version of the duo's 13 December 1991 concert in the Sydney Entertainment Centre in Australia during the Join the Joyride! Tour, which saw Roxette performing to over 1.5 million people during the tour's 100 shows. The video also contains behind the scenes footage, as well as the music videos to "Church of Your Heart", "(Do You Get) Excited?", and their then-current single "How Do You Do!".

Live-Ism is a companion piece to the duo's fourth studio album, Tourism, which was released a week after the film. Furthermore, the audio of two live recordings featured on Tourism – "The Look" and "Joyride" – are both taken from the same concert featured on Live-Ism. The film was remastered and reissued on DVD exclusively in South Africa in 2011 by Revolver Records.

== Formats and track listings ==
All songs written by Per Gessle, except "Hotblooded" and "Watercolours in the Rain" by Marie Fredriksson and Gessle, and "(Do You Get) Excited?" and "Perfect Day" by Gessle and Mats Persson.

- LaserDisc (Europe PLMPB-00671 · Japan TOLW-3135 · US PA-93-520)
- VHS (Europe MVP-9913443)
- DVD (South Africa REVDVD-446)
1. "Introduction" – 2:33
2. "Hotblooded" – 3:44
3. "Dangerous" – 4:09
4. "The Big L." – 4:38
5. "Watercolours in the Rain" – 4:27
6. "Church of Your Heart" (music video; directed by Wayne Isham) – 3:16
7. "Knockin' on Every Door" – 4:35
8. "Things Will Never Be the Same" – 3:04
9. "Dressed for Success" – 4:42
10. "Soul Deep" – 5:10
11. "The Look" – 5:54
12. "It Must Have Been Love" – 7:35
13. "(Do You Get) Excited?" (music video; directed by Wayne Isham) – 4:13
14. "Joyride" – 5:59
15. "Perfect Day" – 5:27
16. "How Do You Do!" (music video; directed by Anders Skog) – 3:13
