= Bag of Trix =

Box set by Roxette
- Released: 11 December 2020
- Recorded: 1986–2016
- Venue: Museum of Pop Culture, Seattle; Himmelstalundshallen, Norrköping
- Studio: Tits & Ass Studios, Halmstad; Atlantis Studios, Polar Studios, EMI Studios, Skinnarviksringen, and Montezuma Studios, Stockholm; Studio Vinden, Djursholm; Abbey Road Studios, London; El Cortijo Studios, Marbella
- Genre: Pop rock
- Language: English; Spanish; Swedish
- Label: Roxette Recordings; Parlophone
- Producer: Clarence Öfwerman; Per Gessle; Marie Fredriksson; Mikael Bolyos; Christoffer Lundquist; Michael Ilbert; Addeboy vs. Cliff

Roxette chronology
Good Karma (2016)	Bag of Trix (2020)	ROX RMX (2022)

Singles from Bag of Trix
- 1. "Help!" Released: 8 May 2020; 2. "Let Your Heart Dance with Me" Released: 2 October 2020; 3. "Tú No Me Comprendes" Released: 6 November 2020; 4. "Piece of Cake" Released: 20 November 2020

Bag of Trix (subtitled Music from the Roxette Vaults) is the third box set compilation by Swedish pop duo Roxette. It was issued physically by Roxette Recordings and Parlophone on 11 December 2020, as a quadruple LP and triple CD set. The record consists of 47 tracks, 28 of which are previously unreleased, and features demos, alternate mixes, bonus tracks, live recordings and Spanish-language versions. Also included are several radio versions of singles, including Brian Malouf's CHR mix of "Joyride", which was the version predominantly played on US radio when the track peaked at number one on the Billboard Hot 100 in May 1991.

The record was dedicated to Marie Fredriksson, and was issued physically two days after the first anniversary of her death. It contains eleven songs either written or co-written by her. Prior to its physical release, the compilation was issued digitally in volumes from 30 October; these volumes were released in two week intervals, and utilised the track listings found on the vinyl editions.

Four singles were issued from the album: a version of the Beatles song "Help!" recorded at Abbey Road Studios in 1995, the Baladas en Español outtake "Tú No Me Comprendes", and two outtakes from the band's final studio album Good Karma, "Let Your Heart Dance with Me" and "Piece of Cake".

== Release and promotion ==
Four songs were issued as singles prior to the release of the album. A cover version of the Beatles song "Help!" – originally recorded in 1995 at Abbey Road Studios – was issued as the lead single in May 2020. This recording remained unreleased for several years before finally appearing on the 2006 box set The Rox Box/Roxette 86–06. Per Gessle, a dedicated Beatles fan, said of the cover: "When we were in Abbey Road we could not help but make our own version of 'Help!'. It was a great day, pop history in all corners of the studio and a fantastic feeling to be part of Abbey Road's unimaginable legacy." The duo also recorded versions of three previous singles at Abbey Road: "Listen to Your Heart", "The Look" and "You Don't Understand Me", all of which appear on Bag of Trix.

The Good Karma outtake "Let Your Heart Dance with Me" was released as a single on 2 October. A music video was created, using footage compiled from Gessle and Fredriksson's private archives, and a limited edition gold-coloured 7" vinyl was released on 9 October. It contained their cover of "Help!" as the b-side. This was followed on 6 November by "Tú No Me Comprendes", a previously unreleased version of their 1995 single "You Don't Understand Me" originally recorded for their Spanish-language compilation Baladas en Español in 1996. Another Good Karma outtake, "Piece of Cake", was released on 20 November. Music videos were also created for the preceding two singles, both consisting of archive footage.

== Critical reception ==
Professional ratings
Review scores
Source	Rating
Aftonbladet	4/5 stars

A writer for Sweden's largest newspaper Aftonbladet said the album demonstrates how Fredriksson and Gessle were "intensely passionate about the music they made, and had a lot of fun together in the meantime". They praised the demo version of "Hotblooded" as one of the "most joyful" songs Roxette ever recorded, saying the track sounds "spontaneous and playful, even if their musical perfection is still present." They also praised Fredriksson's vocals, saying it "does not matter how many times you have heard it before, you can still and consistently be struck by Marie Fredriksson's enormous voice. The sharpness in it is striking, especially in the live recording of the ballad 'Cry' from Norrköping in the winter of 1988. It is one of the album's main gems, because it so nicely captures the audience's great reaction." They summarised by describing the compilation as "not being about the band's best or most beautiful recordings. The collection has a different, more nostalgic value. Above all, it is an opportunity for fans to get close to Roxette for perhaps the last time."

== Formats and track listings ==
All songs written by Per Gessle, except where noted.

=== Vinyl and digital track listing ===
Bag of Trix – Volume 1
No.	Title	Writer(s)	Producer(s)	Length
1.	"Help!" (Abbey Road Session, 15 November 1995)	John Lennon; Paul McCartney	Clarence Öfwerman	2:54
2.	"Listen to Your Heart" (Abbey Road Session, 15 November 1995)	Gessle; Mats Persson	Öfwerman	3:33
3.	"Let Your Heart Dance with Me" (Good Karma Outtake)		Christoffer Lundquist; Gessle; Öfwerman; Addeboy vs. Cliff^{[a]}	3:07
4.	"Waiting for the Rain" (Studio Vinden Demo, 1997)	Marie Fredriksson	Fredriksson; Mikael Bolyos	3:33
5.	"Joyride" (Brian Malouf US Single Mix)		Öfwerman	3:58
6.	"Like Lovers Do" (Montezuma Demo, 25–26 July 1986)		Fredriksson; Gessle; Öfwerman	2:02
7.	"Pocketful of Rain" (Skinnarviksringen Demo, February 1993)	Fredriksson; Gessle	Fredriksson; Bolyos	4:11
8.	"Wish I Could Fly" (Live at EMP Sky Church, Seattle, 7 October 2000)		Fredriksson; Gessle; Öfwerman	4:38
9.	"Happy Together" (T&A Demo, 1–2 July 1998)		Gessle	3:55
10.	"Beautiful Boy" (Studio Vinden Demo, March 2000)	Fredriksson; Gessle	Fredriksson; Bolyos	3:29
11.	"You Don't Understand Me" (T&A Demo, 30 July 1995)	Gessle; Desmond Child	Gessle	4:16
12.	"Hotblooded" (T&A Demo, 13 December 1990)	Fredriksson; Gessle	Fredriksson; Gessle	3:24
Total length:				43:05

Bag of Trix – Volume 2
No.	Title	Writer(s)	Producer(s)	Length
1.	"The Look" (Abbey Road Session, 15 November 1995)		Öfwerman	3:46
2.	"Tú No Me Comprendes" (Spanish Version of "You Don't Understand Me")	Gessle; Child; Luis Gómez-Escolar	Öfwerman	4:25
3.	"Soul Deep" (Tom Lord-Alge Mix)		Öfwerman	3:38
4.	"Always the Last to Know" (Studio Vinden Demo, 1998)	Fredriksson; Gessle	Fredriksson; Bolyos	4:42
5.	"Sleeping in My Car" (The Stockholm Demo Version, 1993)		Gessle	3:13
6.	"Watercolors in the Rain" (T&A Demo, 24 January 1990)	Fredriksson; Gessle	Fredriksson; Gessle	4:02
7.	"From One Heart to Another" (Montezuma Demo, 25–26 July 1986)		Fredriksson; Gessle; Öfwerman	3:06
8.	"I Remember You" (T&A Demo, 15 March 1990)		Gessle	3:33
9.	"It Hurts" (T&A Demo, 3 August 1995)		Gessle	2:56
10.	"Perfect Day" (T&A Demo, 23 August 1990)	Gessle; Persson	Gessle	3:45
11.	"New World" (Studio Vinden Demo, 1996)	Fredriksson	Bolyos	3:37
12.	"Lo Siento" (Spanish Version of "Salvation")	Gessle; Gómez-Escolar	Fredriksson; Gessle; Öfwerman; Michael Ilbert	4:44
Total length:				45:27

Bag of Trix – Volume 3
No.	Title	Writer(s)	Producer(s)	Length
1.	"Piece of Cake" (Good Karma Outtake)	Gessle; Persson	Lundquist; Gessle; Öfwerman; Addeboy vs. Cliff^{[a]}	3:16
2.	"You Don't Understand Me" (Abbey Road Session, 15 November 1995)	Gessle; Child	Öfwerman	3:42
3.	"Dangerous" (Swedish Single Version)		Öfwerman	3:46
4.	"Every Day" (Studio Vinden Demo, March 2000)	Fredriksson; Gessle	Fredriksson; Bolyos	3:22
5.	"The Big L." (T&A Demo, 29 March 1990)		Gessle	3:52
6.	"It Will Take a Long Long Time" (Modern Rock Version)		Fredriksson; Gessle; Öfwerman; Ilbert	3:59
7.	"Little Girl" (Studio Vinden Demo, March 2000)	Fredriksson	Fredriksson; Bolyos	4:24
8.	"Cry" (Live in Norrköping, 16 December 1988)	Fredriksson; Gessle	Fredriksson; Gessle; Öfwerman	5:42
9.	"Goodbye to You" (Montezuma Demo, 25–26 July 1986)		Fredriksson; Gessle; Öfwerman	2:30
10.	"Go to Sleep" (Skinnarviksringen Demo, February 1993)	Fredriksson; Gessle	Fredriksson; Bolyos	5:04
11.	"Quisiera Volar" (Spanish Version of "Wish I Could Fly")	Gessle; Gómez-Escolar	Fredriksson; Gessle; Öfwerman; Ilbert	4:41
Total length:				44:18

Bag of Trix – Volume 4
No.	Title	Writer(s)	Producer(s)	Length
1.	"The Centre of the Heart (Is a Suburb to the Brain)" (Have a Nice Day Version)		Fredriksson; Gessle; Öfwerman; Ilbert	3:39
2.	"Pearls and Passion" (Montezuma Demo, 25–26 July 1986)		Fredriksson; Gessle; Öfwerman	2:41
3.	"Things Will Never Be the Same" (T&A Demo, 13 December 1990)		Fredriksson; Gessle	3:11
4.	"Entering Your Heart" (Long Version)		Fredriksson; Gessle; Öfwerman	4:34
5.	"Cooper (Closer to God)"		Fredriksson; Gessle; Öfwerman; Ilbert	4:17
6.	"Joy of a Toy" (Montezuma Demo, 25–26 July 1986)	Gessle; Persson	Fredriksson; Gessle; Öfwerman	2:25
7.	"It Takes You No Time to Get Here" (Long Version)		Fredriksson; Gessle; Öfwerman	3:53
8.	"Before You Go to Sleep" (T&A Demo, 23 October 1992)		Gessle	2:56
9.	"I Was So Lucky" (The Golden Blow)		Fredriksson; Gessle; Öfwerman; Ilbert	4:21
10.	"Jag älskar (Surrender)" (Montezuma Demo, 25–26 July 1986)		Fredriksson; Gessle; Öfwerman	3:20
11.	"Som i en dröm (So Far Away)" (Montezuma Demo, 25–26 July 1986)		Fredriksson; Gessle; Öfwerman	4:16
12.	"Alguien" (Spanish Version of "Anyone")	Gessle; Gómez-Escolar	Fredriksson; Gessle; Öfwerman; Ilbert	4:31
Total length:				44:04

=== CD track listing ===
Bag of Trix – CD1
No.	Title	Writer(s)	Producer(s)	Length
1.	"Help!" (Abbey Road Session, 15 November 1995)	Lennon; McCartney	Öfwerman	2:54
2.	"Listen to Your Heart" (Abbey Road Session, 15 November 1995)	Gessle; Persson	Öfwerman	3:33
3.	"Let Your Heart Dance with Me" (Good Karma Outtake)		Lundquist; Gessle; Öfwerman; Addeboy vs. Cliff^{[a]}	3:07
4.	"Waiting for the Rain" (Studio Vinden Demo, 1997)	Fredriksson	Fredriksson; Bolyos	3:33
5.	"Joyride" (Brian Malouf US Single Mix)		Öfwerman	3:58
6.	"Like Lovers Do" (Montezuma Demo, 25–26 July 1986)		Fredriksson; Gessle; Öfwerman	2:02
7.	"Pocketful of Rain" (Skinnarviksringen Demo, February 1993)	Fredriksson; Gessle	Fredriksson; Bolyos	4:11
8.	"Tú No Me Comprendes" (Spanish Version of "You Don't Understand Me")	Gessle; Child; Gómez-Escolar	Öfwerman	4:25
9.	"Happy Together" (T&A Demo, 1–2 July 1998)		Gessle	3:55
10.	"Beautiful Boy" (Studio Vinden Demo, March 2000)	Fredriksson; Gessle	Fredriksson; Gessle	3:29
11.	"Cooper (Closer to God)"		Fredriksson; Gessle; Öfwerman; Ilbert	4:17
12.	"Hotblooded" (T&A Demo, 13 December 1990)	Fredriksson; Gessle	Fredriksson; Gessle	3:24
13.	"The Centre of the Heart (Is a Suburb to the Brain)" (Have a Nice Day Version)		Fredriksson; Gessle; Öfwerman; Ilbert	3:39
14.	"Pearls and Passion" (Montezuma Demo, 25–26 July 1986)		Fredriksson; Gessle; Öfwerman	2:41
15.	"Things Will Never Be the Same" (T&A Demo, 13 December 1990)		Fredriksson; Gessle	3:11
16.	"Alguien" (Spanish Version of "Anyone")	Gessle; Gómez-Escolar	Fredriksson; Gessle; Öfwerman; Ilbert	4:31
Total length:				57:23

Bag of Trix – CD2
No.	Title	Writer(s)	Producer(s)	Length
1.	"The Look" (Abbey Road Session, 15 November 1995)		Öfwerman	3:46
2.	"You Don't Understand Me" (Abbey Road Session, 15 November 1995)	Gessle; Child	Öfwerman	3:42
3.	"Soul Deep" (Tom Lord-Alge Mix)		Öfwerman	3:38
4.	"Wish I Could Fly" (Live at EMP Sky Church, Seattle, 7 October 2000)		Fredriksson; Gessle; Öfwerman	4:38
5.	"New World" (Studio Vinden Demo, 1996)	Fredriksson	Bolyos	3:37
6.	"Sleeping in My Car" (The Stockholm Demo Version, 1993)		Gessle	3:13
7.	"Watercolors in the Rain" (T&A Demo, 24 January 1990)	Fredriksson; Gessle	Fredriksson; Gessle	4:02
8.	"From One Heart to Another" (Montezuma Demo, 25–26 July 1986)		Fredriksson; Gessle; Öfwerman	3:06
9.	"I Remember You" (T&A Demo, 15 March 1990)		Gessle	3:33
10.	"It Hurts" (T&A Demo, 3 August 1995)		Gessle	2:56
11.	"Perfect Day" (T&A Demo, 23 August 1990)	Gessle; Persson	Gessle	3:45
12.	"Joy of a Toy" (Montezuma Demo, 25–26 July 1986)	Gessle; Persson	Fredriksson; Gessle; Öfwerman	2:25
13.	"Always the Last to Know" (Studio Vinden Demo, 1998)	Fredriksson; Gessle	Fredriksson; Bolyos	4:42
14.	"It Takes You No Time to Get Here" (Long Version)		Fredriksson; Gessle; Öfwerman	3:53
15.	"Before You Go to Sleep" (T&A Demo, 23 October 1992)		Gessle	2:56
16.	"Lo Siento" (Spanish Version of "Salvation")	Gessle; Gómez-Escolar	Fredriksson; Gessle; Öfwerman; Ilbert	4:44
Total length:				59:07

Bag of Trix – CD3
No.	Title	Writer(s)	Producer(s)	Length
1.	"Piece of Cake" (Good Karma Outtake)	Gessle; Persson	Lundquist; Gessle; Öfwerman; Addeboy vs. Cliff^{[a]}	3:16
2.	"You Don't Understand Me" (T&A Demo, 30 July 1995)	Gessle; Child	Gessle	4:16
3.	"Dangerous" (Swedish Single Version)		Öfwerman	3:46
4.	"Every Day" (Studio Vinden Demo, March 2000)	Fredriksson; Gessle	Fredriksson; Bolyos	3:22
5.	"The Big L." (T&A Demo, 29 March 1990)		Gessle	3:52
6.	"It Will Take a Long Long Time" (Modern Rock Version)		Fredriksson; Gessle; Öfwerman; Ilbert	3:59
7.	"Little Girl" (Studio Vinden Demo, March 2000)	Fredriksson	Fredriksson; Bolyos	4:24
8.	"Cry" (Live in Norrköping, 16 December 1988)	Fredriksson; Gessle	Fredriksson; Gessle; Öfwerman	5:42
9.	"Goodbye to You" (Montezuma Demo, 25–26 July 1986)		Fredriksson; Gessle; Öfwerman	2:30
10.	"Go to Sleep" (Skinnarviksringen Demo, February 1993)	Fredriksson; Gessle	Fredriksson; Bolyos	5:04
11.	"I Was So Lucky" (The Golden Blow)		Fredriksson; Gessle; Öfwerman; Ilbert	4:21
12.	"Entering Your Heart" (Long Version)		Fredriksson; Gessle; Öfwerman	4:34
13.	"Jag älskar (Surrender)" (Montezuma Demo, 25–26 July 1986)		Fredriksson; Gessle; Öfwerman	3:20
14.	"Som i en dröm (So Far Away)" (Montezuma Demo, 25–26 July 1986)		Fredriksson; Gessle; Öfwerman	4:16
15.	"Quisiera Volar" (Spanish Version of "Wish I Could Fly")	Gessle; Gómez-Escolar	Fredriksson; Gessle; Öfwerman; Ilbert	4:41
Total length:				61:52

Notes

- ^{^[a]} signifies a co-producer

== Personnel ==
Credits adapted from Tidal.

- Marie Fredriksson – lead and background vocals, keyboards, engineering, production and mixing
- Per Gessle – lead and background vocals, guitars, engineering, production and mixing
- Per "Pelle" Alsing – drums
- Mikael Bolyos – instrumentation, engineering, production and mixing (Studio Vinden and Skinnarviksringen sessions); additional engineering ("Cooper")
- Jonas Isacsson – acoustic, bass and electric guitars
- Christer Jansson – percussion ("It Will Take a Long Long Time"); cymbals and drums ("Quisiera Volar"); drums, tambourine and percussion ("Cooper" and "Alguien")
- Christoffer Lundquist – engineering, production and mixing ("Let Your Heart Dance with Me" and "Piece of Cake"); bass guitar and background vocals ("Lo Siento", "Quisiera Volar" and "Alguien"); zither ("It Will Take a Long Long Time", "Cooper" and "Alguien"); guitar, drums and tambourine ("Alguien")
- Clarence Öfwerman – piano, keyboards, synthesizer, bells, tambourine, programming, arrangements, engineering, production and mixing
- Mats "MP" Persson – instrumentation and engineering (T&A sessions); twelve-string guitar and additional engineering ("It Will Take a Long Long Time"); string arrangement ("Quisiera Volar"); programming, mixing and additional engineering ("Cooper")

Technical personnel

- Addeboy vs. Cliff – co-production ("Let Your Heart Dance with Me" and "Piece of Cake")
- Michael Ilbert – engineering and production ("Lo Siento", "It Will Take a Long Long Time", "Quisiera Volar", "The Centre of the Heart", "Cooper" and "Alguien"); programming ("It Will Take a Long Long Time" and "Quisiera Volar"); string arrangement ("Quisiera Volar")
- Alar Suurna – engineering and mixing

Additional personnel

- Micke "Nord" Andersson – twelve string acoustic and Rickenbacker guitars ("Quisiera Volar")
- Magnus Blom – alto saxophone ("Alguien")
- Tommy Cassemar – bass guitar ("Soul Deep")
- Hasse Dyvik – trumpet and flugelhorn ("Alguien")
- Anders Evaldsson – trombone ("Alguien")
- Uno Forsberg – trumpet ("Soul Deep")
- Lennart Haglund – engineering assistant ("It Will Take a Long Long Time" and "Cooper")
- Mats Holmquist – conducting ("It Will Take a Long Long Time", "Quisiera Volar", "Cooper" and "Alguien")
- Jonas Knutsson – soprano saxophone ("I Was So Lucky")
- Ronny Lahti – mixing ("Let Your Heart Dance with Me")
- Brian Malouf – mixing ("Joyride")
- George Marino – mastering engineer ("It Will Take a Long Long Time", "Quisiera Volar", "Cooper" and "Alguien")
- Mats Persson – percussion ("Soul Deep")
- Mikael Renlinden – trumpet ("Soul Deep")
- Tomas Sjörgen – trumpet ("Soul Deep")
- Stockholms Nya Kammarorkester (credited as SNYKO) – strings ("It Will Take a Long Long Time", "Quisiera Volar", "Cooper" and "Alguien")
- Robert Wellerfors – engineering ("Soul Deep")

== Charts ==
Chart performance of Bag of Trix
Chart (2020)	Peak position
Austrian Albums (Ö3 Austria)	58
Czech Albums (ČNS IFPI)	54
German Albums (Offizielle Top 100)	14
Hungarian Albums (MAHASZ)	13
Spanish Albums (Promusicae)	57
Swedish Albums (Sverigetopplistan)	2
Swiss Albums (Schweizer Hitparade)	31

== Release history ==
Release history and formats for Bag of Trix
Region	Date	Format	Edition(s)	Label	Catalog #	Ref.
World	30 October 2020	DL; streaming	Volume 1	Roxette Recordings; Parlophone	—	
World	13 November 2020	DL; streaming	Volume 2	Roxette Recordings; Parlophone	—	
World	27 November 2020	DL; streaming	Volume 3	Roxette Recordings; Parlophone	—	
World	11 December 2020	DL; streaming	Volume 4	Roxette Recordings; Parlophone	—	
World	11 December 2020	CD; LP	Physical box sets	Roxette Recordings; Parlophone	50541 970819–3 4 (LP); 50541 970850–7 9 (CD)	
