= Piece of Cake (Roxette song) =

Single by Roxette

from the album Bag of Trix
- Released: 20 November 2020
- Recorded: 2016
- Length: 3:15
- Label: Roxette Recordings; Parlophone
- Songwriter: Per Gessle
- Producers: Clarence Öfwerman; Christoffer Lundquist; Gessle; Addeboy vs. Cliff

Roxette singles chronology
"Tú No Me Comprendes" (2020)	"Piece of Cake" (2020)

Music video
- "Piece of Cake" on YouTube

"Piece of Cake" is a song by Swedish pop music duo Roxette, released on 20 November 2020 as the fourth single from their compilation album Bag of Trix. Originally recorded for their 2016 album Good Karma, it was the last song Per Gessle wrote for Roxette, and features the final vocal Marie Fredriksson recorded for the duo prior to her death in December 2019. A music video was created for the song, consisting of archive footage of the band on previous tours.

== Background and recording ==
The track was originally recorded for Roxette's tenth studio album Good Karma in 2016; it was the last song Per Gessle wrote for Roxette, and contains the final vocal Marie Fredriksson recorded for Roxette prior to her death in December 2019. Gessle said Good Karma "took forever to make, and by the end everyone was pretty exhausted so we never really got around to finishing ['Piece of Cake']". While compiling the Bag of Trix compilation, Gessle said he listened to the track and realised he had "all the pieces" needed to create a finalised version, saying: "All that's left to do is get a good mix." The song was mixed by Ronny Lahti, who also mixed Roxette's 2001 studio album Room Service.

Gessle wrote about the song in the introductory prose of his 2014 book Songs, Sketches & Reflections: The English Part, saying the lyric is "quite typical of my way of writing English lyrics. Someone used that expression recently, and it stuck in my mind. That’s the way it’s worked for me ever since I started writing lyrics, and especially English lyrics. You catch words and phrases that probably get a partially different meaning for me than for someone with English as their native tongue." He described "Piece of Cake" as "an unusual title to work with, since it's pretty obvious. And since it means that something is dead easy, I will automatically focus on the opposite; I write the lyric about how hard everything is, but that thanks to one thing or the other it will become a 'piece of cake'."

== Release and promotion ==
A music video was created for "Piece of Cake" using archive footage of the band on tour. The video premiered on YouTube on 20 November, the same day a 3-track single was released digitally: this single featured their previous two singles, "Let Your Heart Dance with Me" and "Tú No Me Comprendes", as b-sides. "Piece of Cake" was chosen as the 'Song of the Week' on Sveriges Radio P4.

== Critical reception ==
Polish website Interia commended Ronny Lahti's mix, saying he gave Room Service a "holiday lightness" while saying his participation on "Piece of Cake" resulted in a song which was "full of summer, sunshine and optimism, even if it was written during Marie's last days." Norwegian newspaper Verdens Gang gave the song a mixed review, describing it a track Roxette fans would both enjoy and dread, elaborating it was "the last song Per Gessle and Marie Fredriksson recorded together. It is unfortunately a mess of misunderstood production and strange sounds that do not really belong anywhere. In many ways, it is akin to 'Stars'. That is, they tried to make something danceable and catchy at the same time." Their writer went on to compliment Fredriksson's vocals, but said that overall the song "sounds weaker than most would like to admit."

== Track listing ==
Track 1 written by Per Gessle and Mats "MP" Persson; track 2 written by Gessle; track 3 written by Gessle, Desmond Child and Luis Gómez-Escolar.

- Digital download
1. "Piece of Cake" – 3:15
2. "Let Your Heart Dance with Me" – 3:07
3. "Tú No Me Comprendes" – 4:25

== Credits and personnel ==
Credits adapted from Tidal.

- Marie Fredriksson – lead and background vocals
- Per Gessle – lead and background vocals and production
- Christoffer Lundquist – background vocals, programming, engineering and production
- Clarence Öfwerman – keyboards, programming, production and mixing
- Addeboy vs. Cliff – production (tracks 1 and 2)
- Luis Gómez-Escolar – translator (track 3)
- Ronny Lahti – mixing (tracks 1 and 2)
