= The Videos (Roxette video) =

Video by Roxette
- Released: 18 November 1991
- Genre: Pop rock
- Length: 89:01
- Language: English
- Label: EMI; Picture Music International
- Producer: Tony Harding; Andy Picheta; Lisa Hollingshead; Sally Norvell; Jeff Tannebring; Mats Jonstam

Roxette chronology
Look Sharp Live (1989)	The Videos (1991)	Live-Ism (1992)

The Videos is the first music video compilation by Swedish pop music duo Roxette, released on 18 November 1991 on VHS and LaserDisc formats by EMI and Picture Music International. It consists of the music videos of every commercially-released single from both their 1988 album Look Sharp! and 1991 album Joyride, as well as the non-album single "It Must Have Been Love" from the Pretty Woman soundtrack. The version of "It Must Have Been Love" contained on this video is unique to this release, as it is the only version which removed all of the footage from Pretty Woman.

The Videos does not included "Chances" from Look Sharp!, as that single only received a limited release in select European territories. Later videos created for "(Do You Get) Excited?" and "Church of Your Heart" are also excluded, as they had not yet been filmed. They were included instead on 1992's Live-Ism. The video ends with a 50-minute film created by Sweden's Sveriges Television network, which documents the making-of the Joyride album.

== Track listing ==
The Videos
No.	Title	Director	Length
1.	"The Look"	Peter Heath	3:55
2.	"Dressed for Success"	Peter Heath	4:09
3.	"Dangerous"	Doug Freel	3:54
4.	"Listen to Your Heart"	Doug Freel	5:04
5.	"It Must Have Been Love"	Doug Freel	4:18
6.	"Joyride"	Doug Freel	4:38
7.	"Fading Like a Flower (Every Time You Leave)"	Doug Freel	3:56
8.	"The Big L."	Anders Skog	4:27
9.	"Spending My Time"	Wayne Isham	4:45
10.	"The Making of Joyride"	Mats Jonstam	49:55
Total length:			89:01

== Certifications ==
Region	Certification	Certified units/sales
Germany (BVMI)	Gold	25,000^{^}
^{^} Shipments figures based on certification alone.
