= Queen of Rain =

1992 single by Roxette

Single by Roxette

from the album Tourism
- B-side: "Pearls of Passion"
- Released: 26 October 1992
- Recorded: June 1990
- Studio: EMI (Stockholm, Sweden)
- Length: 4:49
- Label: EMI
- Songwriters: Per Gessle; Mats Persson
- Producer: Clarence Öfwerman

Roxette singles chronology
"How Do You Do!" (1992)	"Queen of Rain" (1992)	"Fingertips '93" (1993)

Music video
- "Queen of Rain" on YouTube

"Queen of Rain" is a song by Swedish duo Roxette. It was released on 26 October 1992 by EMI Records as the second single from their fourth studio album, Tourism (1992). The ballad is written by Per Gessle and Mats Persson, and produced by Clarence Öfwerman. It became a top-20 hit in Belgium, the Netherlands, Spain and Sweden. In Germany, it spent over three months on the German Singles Chart, on which it peaked at number 19.

== Background and recording ==
The song was recorded in June 1990 at EMI Studios in Stockholm during sessions for their 1991 album Joyride. It was originally set to appear as that album's final track, but was excluded in favour of "Perfect Day". However, the closing notes and sound effects contained on the outro of the album version of "Things Will Never Be the Same" – the track which precedes "Perfect Day" on Joyride – can still be heard over the crowd noise contained on the intro of "Queen of Rain". Roxette later recorded a Spanish version of the track, titled "Una reina va detrás de un rey" ("A Queen Goes After a King"), for their 1996 compilation album Baladas en Español.

Prior to the release of "Queen of Rain", one of the single's b-side, "Pearls of Passion", had remained unreleased outside of Sweden. The song would later be included as a bonus track on the 1997 reissue of their debut album, Pearls of Passion (1986).

== Critical reception ==
AllMusic editor Bryan Buss described the song as "haunting" and "hopeful" in his review of Tourism.

== Formats and track listings ==
- Cassette and 7-inch single (Europe 8650124 · UK EM253)
1. "Queen of Rain" – 4:49
2. "It Must Have Been Love" (Live from the Sydney Entertainment Centre on 13 December 1991) – 5:29
- CD single (Europe · Australia 8650132)
1. "Queen of Rain" – 4:49
2. "It Must Have Been Love" (Live from Sydney) – 5:29
3. "Paint" (Live from Sydney) – 3:20
4. "Pearls of Passion" – 3:33
- UK CD1 single (UK CDEMS253)
1. "Queen of Rain" (Radio Edit) – 4:28
2. "Pearls of Passion" – 3:33
3. "Interview with Roxette" – 14:30
- UK CD2 single (UK CDEM253)
1. "Queen of Rain" – 4:49
2. "It Must Have Been Love" (Live from Sydney) – 5:29
3. "Paint" (Live from Sydney) – 3:20
4. "Dangerous" – 3:46

== Credits and personnel ==
Credits are adapted from the liner notes of The Ballad Hits.

Studios

- Recorded at EMI Studios (Stockholm, Sweden) in June 1990
- Mixed at EMI Studios (Stockholm, Sweden)

Musicians

- Marie Fredriksson – lead and background vocals
- Per Gessle – background vocals, mixing
- Bo Eriksson – oboe
- Anders Herrlin bass guitar, programming, engineering
- Jonas Isaacson – guitars
- Clarence Öfwerman – keyboards, programming, production, mixing
- Alar Suurna – engineering, mixing

== Charts ==
=== Weekly charts ===
Chart (1992)	Peak position
Australia (ARIA)	66
Belgium (Ultratop 50 Flanders)	14
Canada Top Singles (RPM)	47
Germany (GfK)	19
Netherlands (Dutch Top 40)	26
Netherlands (Single Top 100)	20
Spain (AFYVE)	7
Sweden (Sverigetopplistan)	12
Switzerland (Schweizer Hitparade)	27
UK Singles (Official Charts)	28
UK Airplay (Music Week)	36

=== Year-end charts ===
Chart (1992)	Position
Sweden (Topplistan)	74

== Release history ==
Region	Date	Format(s)	Label(s)	Ref.
Europe	26 October 1992	7-inch vinyl; CD; cassette	EMI	
Australia	16 November 1992	CD	EMI	
Australia	30 November 1992	Cassette	EMI	
Japan	8 January 1993	Mini-CD	EMI	
