= Spending My Time =

1991 single by Roxette

Single by Roxette

from the album Joyride
- B-side: "The Sweet Hello, The Sad Goodbye"
- Released: 14 October 1991
- Recorded: July 1990
- Studio: EMI (Stockholm, Sweden)
- Genre: Pop rock
- Length: 4:39
- Label: EMI
- Songwriters: Per Gessle; Mats Persson
- Producer: Clarence Öfwerman

Roxette singles chronology
| "The Big L." (1991) | "Spending My Time" (1991) | "Church of Your Heart" (1992) |

Music video
- "Spending My Time" on YouTube

"Spending My Time" is a song by Swedish duo Roxette, released in October 1991, by EMI Records, as the fourth single from their third studio album, Joyride (1991). It was written by Per Gessle and Mats Persson, and produced by Clarence Öfwerman. The single attained moderate success, reaching the top 10 in Germany, Canada and Italy, as well as number 22 on the UK Singles Chart and number 32 on the US Billboard Hot 100. The accompanying music video was directed by Wayne Isham.

A remix was created by M.C. King Carli and Dr. Renault (pseudonyms used by Öfwerman & Anders) at EMI Studios in Stockholm, Sweden, in July 1991, and was included on the single. A Spanish version of the song, titled "Un Día Sin Ti" ("A Day Without You"), was released in 1996 as the lead single from the duo's Spanish-language compilation album Baladas en Español.

== Critical reception ==
AllMusic editor Bryan Buss noted "the quiet desperation" of the song in his review of Joyride. Larry Flick from Billboard magazine described it as an "acoustic-anchored pop/rock ballad", noting further that the "memorable melody and throaty vocals by Marie Fredriksson are [the] track's true highlights." Swedish Expressen named it a "high-pitched melancholy ballad". Dave Sholin from the Gavin Report wrote, "In a Top 40 world starved for pop music, Per and Marie can be considered a delicacy. No matter what the tempo, all their songs contain melodies that win listeners over immediately. Hearing this latest release makes it easy to understand why they've established such a large and loyal international following."

A reviewer from Göteborgsposten complimented the song for its "strong" chorus. Kim Såtvedt from Norwegian Laagendalsposten also complimented Roxette for their "beautiful ballads" like "Spending My Time", praising it as "enthralling". Pan-European magazine Music & Media described it as a "melancholic ballad". Brendon Veevers from Renowned for Sound called it "the greatest musical creation of all time" in 2013, adding the song as "such an emotional charged and exquisitely delivered song". J.D. Considine of Rolling Stone remarked Fredriksson's "vocal fire-work" on the song. Miranda Sawyer from Smash Hits commented, "Yes, it's a hankies-up ballad with a thumping Swedish beat."

== Commercial performance ==
The song was not as commercially successful as the duo's preceding singles. It peaked at number thirty-two on the Billboard Hot 100 in the US, ending a run of five consecutive top two singles on the chart. In the liner notes of their 1995 greatest hits compilation Don't Bore Us, Get to the Chorus!, Per Gessle said he believed that "Spending My Time" was "going to be our biggest hit ever, which might have happened if not our American record company had fired a lot of... ah, never mind." At the end of 1991, EMI merged with other record companies to form EMI Records Group North America. The merger resulted in the new company firing over a hundred members of staff, and saw Roxette receiving little support from the new label. The song also peaked at number nine in Canada.

== Music video ==
The music video for "Spending My Time" was directed by American director Wayne Isham and depicts singer Marie Fredriksson at multiple places in a house, such as sitting by a window, lying in bed, sitting on a couch and at a table. Gessle also appears occasionally playing the guitar.

== Track listings ==
All songs were written by Per Gessle and Mats Persson except "The Sweet Hello, the Sad Goodbye", written by Gessle.

- Cassette and 7-inch single
1. "Spending My Time" – 4:39
2. "The Sweet Hello, The Sad Goodbye" – 4:49
- UK 7-inch single
1. "Spending My Time" – 4:39
2. "Listen to Your Heart" (Swedish Single Version) – 5:10
- 12-inch single
1. "Spending My Time" (Electric Dance Remix) – 5:27
2. "Spending My Time" – 4:39
3. "The Sweet Hello, The Sad Goodbye" – 4:49
- CD single
1. "Spending My Time" – 4:39
2. "The Sweet Hello, The Sad Goodbye" – 4:49
3. "Spending My Time" (Electric Dance Remix) – 5:27
4. "Spending My Time" (Electric Dance Remix/Instrumental) – 5:27
- UK CD single
1. "Spending My Time" – 4:39
2. "The Sweet Hello, The Sad Goodbye" – 4:49
3. "Spending My Time" (Electric Dance Remix) – 5:27
4. "Listen to Your Heart" (7-inch Edit) – 4:06

== Credits and personnel ==
Credits are adapted from the liner notes of The Ballad Hits.

Studios

- Recorded in July 1990 at EMI Studios (Stockholm, Sweden)
- Mixed at EMI Studios

Musicians

- Marie Fredriksson – lead and background vocals
- Per Gessle – background vocals, mixing
- Anders Herrlin – programming and engineering
- Jonas Isaacson – acoustic and electric guitars
- Clarence Öfwerman – keyboards, programming and production
- Alar Suurna – mixing, engineering
- Clarence Öfwerman – mixing

== Charts ==
=== Weekly charts ===
Weekly chart performance for "Spending My Time"
| Chart (1991–1992) | Peak position |
|---|---|
| Australia (ARIA) | 16 |
| Austria (Ö3 Austria Top 40) | 16 |
| Belgium (Ultratop 50 Flanders) | 11 |
| Canada Top Singles (RPM) | 9 |
| Canada Adult Contemporary (RPM) | 10 |
| Europe (Eurochart Hot 100) | 16 |
| Europe (European Hit Radio) | 4 |
| Finland (Suomen virallinen lista) | 18 |
| Germany (GfK) | 9 |
| Ireland (IRMA) | 23 |
| Italy (Musica e dischi) | 25 |
| Luxembourg (Radio Luxembourg) | 13 |
| Netherlands (Dutch Top 40) | 29 |
| Netherlands (Single Top 100) | 26 |
| New Zealand (Recorded Music NZ) | 31 |
| Spain (AFYVE) | 34 |
| Sweden (Sverigetopplistan) | 11 |
| Switzerland (Schweizer Hitparade) | 15 |
| UK Singles (Official Charts) | 22 |
| UK Airplay (Music Week) | 15 |
| US Billboard Hot 100 | 32 |
| US Adult Contemporary (Billboard) | 20 |
| US Cash Box Top 100 | 14 |
| US Adult Contemporary (Gavin Report) | 11 |
| US Top 40 (Gavin Report) | 10 |
| US Adult Contemporary (Radio & Records) | 19 |
| US Contemporary Hit Radio (Radio & Records) | 14 |

=== Year-end charts ===
1991 year-end chart performance for "Spending My Time"
| Chart (1991) | Position |
|---|---|
| Sweden (Topplistan) | 71 |

1992 year-end chart performance for "Spending My Time"
| Chart (1992) | Position |
|---|---|
| Brazil (Crowley) | 67 |
| Canada Adult Contemporary (RPM) | 81 |
| Germany (Media Control) | 76 |

== Certifications ==
Certifications and sales for "Spending My Time"
| Region | Certification | Certified units/sales |
|---|---|---|
| Denmark (IFPI Danmark) | Gold | 45,000^{‡} |
^{‡} Sales+streaming figures based on certification alone.

== Release history ==
Release dates and formats for "Spending My Time"
| Region | Date | Format(s) | Label(s) | Ref. |
|---|---|---|---|---|
| United States | 14 October 1991 | Radio airplay | EMI | |
| Sweden | 30 October 1991 | 7-inch vinyl | EMI | |
| United Kingdom | 11 November 1991 | 7-inch vinyl; CD; cassette | EMI | |
| Australia | 18 November 1991 | CD; cassette | EMI | |

== "Un Día Sin Ti" (1996) ==
"Un Día Sin Ti"

Single by Roxette

from the album Baladas en Español
- B-side: "Timida"
- Released: 29 October 1996
- Label: EMI
- Songwriters: Per Gessle; Mats Persson; Luis G. Escolar
- Producer: Clarence Öfwerman

Roxette singles chronology
| "She Doesn't Live Here Anymore" (1996) | "Un Día Sin Ti" (1996) | "No Sé Si Es Amor" (1997) |

Music video
- "Un día sin ti" on YouTube

Roxette released a Spanish-language compilation album, Baladas en Español, in 1996. It consisted of twelve of their down-tempo singles and album tracks, which were translated by Spanish songwriter Luis Gómez-Escolar. This album was only released in Spanish and Portuguese-speaking territories. A translated version of "Spending My Time", titled "Un Día Sin Ti" ("A Day Without You"), was released in November 1996 as the album's lead single. Unfortunately, it was later reversioned as a cumbia santafesina, by the argentine cumbia band "Los del Fuego", in 2007.

=== Music video ===
A new music video was filmed for this version of the song. It was created by Jonas Åkerlund, who would go on to direct a total of twelve music videos for the duo. It features close-up shots of Marie singing and Per playing guitar, interspersed with clips of a woman descending into alcoholism, and suggestively sniffing a table counter.

=== Track listings ===
All music was composed by Per Gessle and Mats Persson. Lyrics were written by Gessle. Spanish lyrics were written by Luis G. Escolar.

- CD single
1. "Un Día Sin Ti" ("Spending My Time") – 4:39
2. "Tímida" ("Vulnerable") – 4:44

=== Charts ===
Weekly chart performance for "Un Día Sin Ti"
| Chart (1997) | Peak position |
|---|---|
| Spain (AFYVE) | 20 |
