= Alvear Palace Hotel =

Hotel in Buenos Aires, Argentina

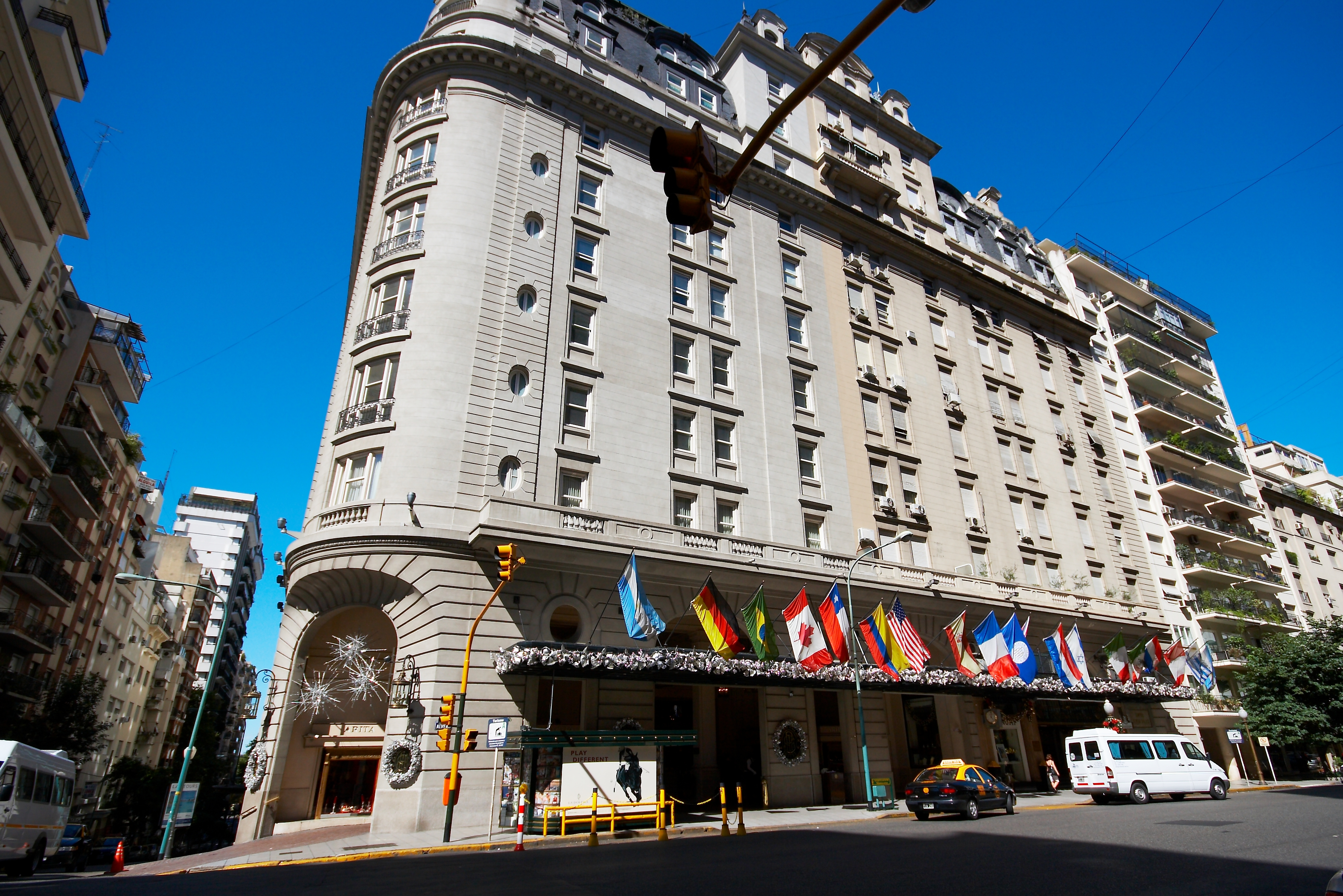
- The hotel on Avenida Alvear in 2009
- Interactive map of the Alvear Palace Hotel area

General information
- Type: Hotel
- Architectural style: French Second Empire-inspired
- Location: Avenida Alvear 1891, Buenos Aires, Argentina
- Coordinates: 34°35′15.7″S 58°23′19.7″W
- Construction started: 1922
- Opened: 3 September 1932
- Renovated: 2003–2004, 2021
- Client: Rafael de Miero
- Owner: Grupo Sutton Dabbah (1984–present)

Technical details
- Floor count: 11

Design and construction
- Architects: Valentín Brodsky and Estanislao Pirovano
- Engineer: Escudero and Ortúzar
- Designations: Historic heritage of the City of Buenos Aires (2003)

Other information
- Number of rooms: 207

Website
- alvearpalace.com

The Alvear Palace Hotel is a luxury hotel on Avenida Alvear in Recoleta, an upscale neighbourhood of Buenos Aires, Argentina. Commissioned by the physician Rafael de Miero, it opened on 3 September 1932 after a decade of construction and became one of the city's grand hotels, housing royalty, heads of state, and film stars. It has belonged to the Grupo Sutton Dabbah since 1984. The city government declared the building part of its historic heritage in 2003, and the hotel reopened in September 2021 after a 17-month restoration.

== History ==
=== Construction and opening ===
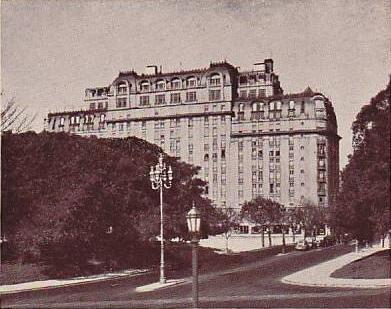
The hotel in the 1930s

Rafael de Miero, a Buenos Aires physician, conceived the hotel after travels to France, and wanted to give his home city a luxury hotel in the French style. The site, at the corner of Avenida Alvear and Ayacucho Street, had held the first British consulate in Buenos Aires. Construction, directed by the architects Valentín Brodsky and Estanislao Pirovano with the engineers Escudero and Ortúzar, took a decade, in part because of the steeply sloping ground towards Ayacucho Street.

The hotel opened on 3 September 1932 with a reception attended by President Agustín P. Justo. It began with 191 rooms, and in the 1940s it was expanded onto the site of a neighbouring mansion on Avenida Alvear.

=== Decline and restoration ===
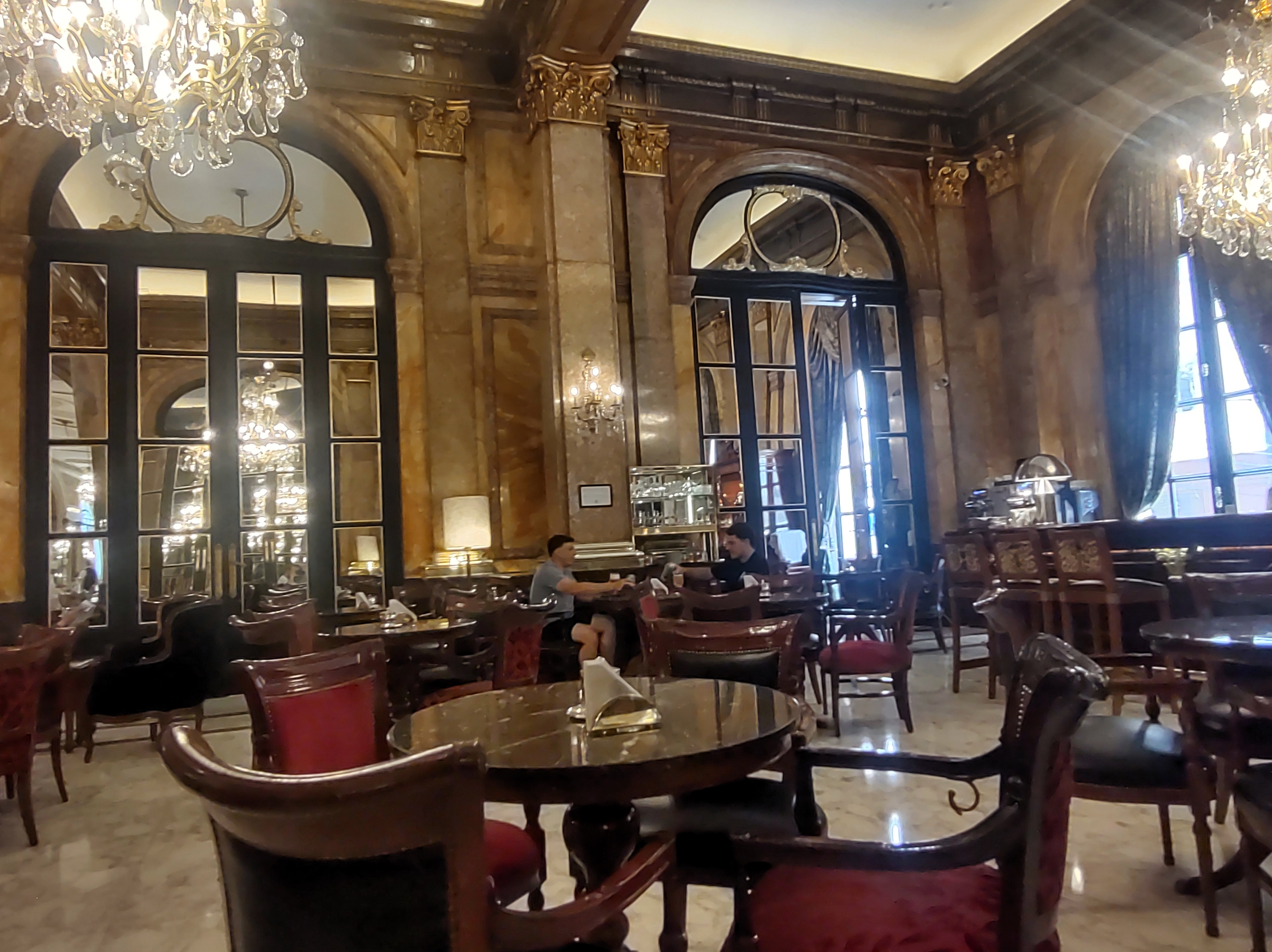
A dining room of the hotel

In 1970 the hotel passed to Baron Andreas von Wernitz Salm-Kyrburg, under whom it declined; most of its rooms were sold to private owners as bankruptcy approached. After insolvency proceedings in the late 1970s, the hotel was sold to the Aragón hotel group, and in 1984 to the businessman David Sutton Dabbah, whose group restored it.

Work announced in 2003 restored the facade, removing layers of paint to expose the original Paris-stone render; the rooftop Roof Garden restaurant, a venue for social events for decades, was demolished to make room for 22 new rooms. In the same year, the city government declared the building part of its historic heritage. In 2009 the group announced a US$60 million expansion with two more five-star hotels in Buenos Aires. After closing during the COVID-19 pandemic, the hotel reopened in September 2021 following a 17-month restoration; it has 207 rooms.

== Architecture ==
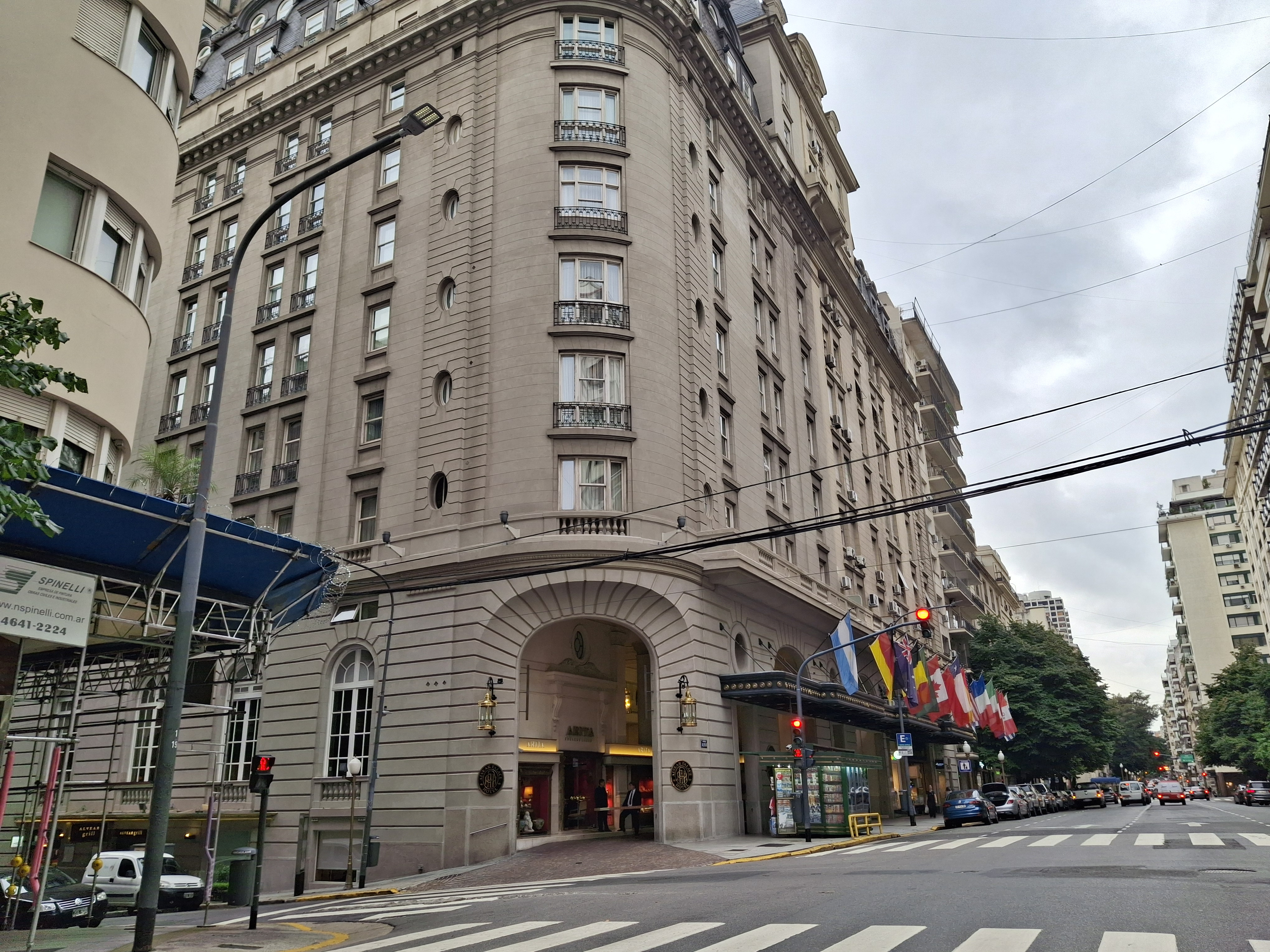
The Ayacucho Street corner in 2025

The building, French Second Empire-inspired in style, has 11 floors and five basement levels. The interiors feature French Baroque motifs, and the guest rooms were furnished in period styles ranging from Louis XIV to First Empire. The facade is finished in a render imitating Paris stone, which had been covered by layers of paint until the 2003–2004 restoration.

== Notable guests ==
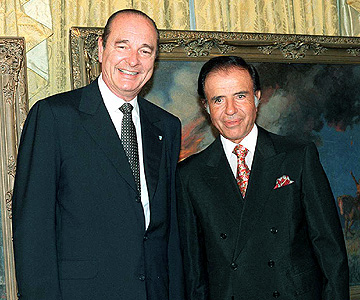
Jacques Chirac and Carlos Menem at the hotel

Royalty and heads of state who have stayed at the hotel include Emperor Akihito of Japan, Charles, Prince of Wales, and Spanish, Norwegian, and Danish royalty, as well as Vladimir Putin, Jacques Chirac, Nelson Mandela, Henry Kissinger, and the Emir of Kuwait. For Akihito's 1997 visit, his suite was decorated with marine motifs and fitted with aquariums. Entertainment and cultural figures who have stayed there include Walt Disney, Tony Curtis and Janet Leigh, Sophia Loren, Joan Collins, Catherine Deneuve, Sean Connery, Marcello Mastroianni, Omar Sharif, Al Pacino, Tom Cruise, Francis Ford Coppola, B.B. King, Claudia Schiffer, Carolina Herrera, Selena Gomez, and The Weeknd. Curtis lived at the hotel with his family in the early 1960s while filming Taras Bulba in Argentina. After a stay, Connery had the hotel's pastries shipped twice a year to his home in Marbella.

On 4 May 1992, the Swedish pop duo Roxette recorded the songs "Here Comes the Weekend" and "So Far Away" in room 603; both were included on their album Tourism. The tango lyricist Horacio Ferrer lived in an eighth-floor apartment in the hotel from 1976 until his death in December 2014.

== See also ==
- Plaza Hotel Buenos Aires – historic Buenos Aires hotel under the same ownership group
- Llao Llao Hotel – Patagonian resort hotel under the same ownership group
- Alvear Tower – residential and hotel skyscraper in Puerto Madero, the tallest building in Argentina
