= You Don't Understand Me =

1995 single by Roxette

Single by Roxette

from the album Don't Bore Us, Get to the Chorus! Roxette's Greatest Hits
- B-side: "Crazy About You"
- Released: 2 October 1995
- Studio: EMI (Stockholm, Sweden)
- Genre: Alternative pop
- Length: 4:28
- Label: EMI
- Songwriters: Per Gessle; Desmond Child
- Producer: Clarence Öfwerman

Roxette singles chronology
"Vulnerable" (1995)	"You Don't Understand Me" (1995)	"The Look '95" (1995)

Music video
- "You Don't Understand Me" on YouTube

"You Don't Understand Me" is a song by Swedish pop music duo Roxette. Written by Per Gessle with American composer Desmond Child, it was released in October 1995, by EMI Records, as the lead single from the duo's first greatest hits compilation album, Don't Bore Us, Get to the Chorus! Roxette's Greatest Hits (1995). It is produced by Clarence Öfwerman and was also the only new song from the original edition of the album to appear on the 2000 U.S. edition. The song was a hit in several European countries, reaching the top 20 in Finland, Italy, the Netherlands, Poland, Spain, and the duo's native Sweden. The song was also a hit in Germany where, despite peaking at number 44, it would spend over three months on the German Singles Chart.

== Composition and style ==
The song was written by Per Gessle and Desmond Child. In the Don't Bore Us, Get to the Chorus! liner notes, Per called it: "the first [Roxette] song ever to be written with someone from the 'outside'. It wasn't intended to be recorded by Roxette. Desmond came to Halmstad this summer, just to see if we could create something together. He had this idea, I changed it around a bit, and asked Marie to sing on the demo. Then I realised it suited us very well." According to Ultimate Guitar, "You Don't Understand Me" is an alternative pop ballad, with a slow tempo of 77 beats per minute. Each verse is composed of two repetitions of a C–D–Em–C–C–D–Em sequence, and the bridge consists of a Gm–B♭–F–C–B♭–F–C–B♭–F–Gm sequence. The chorus is composed of two repetitions of B♭–C–F–C sequence, with the final note amended to a Gm during the final bar.

The duo recorded acoustic versions of several songs for inclusion as b-sides on UK editions of this single. New versions of "You Don't Understand Me", "The Look" and "Listen to Your Heart", as well as a cover of The Beatles' "Help!", were recorded at Abbey Road Studios in London in early 1995, although the latter would remain unreleased until it appeared on the 2006 box set The Rox Box/Roxette 86-06.

== Critical reception ==
Pan-European magazine Music & Media commented, "Singer Marie Frederiksson cries out as she is left in the dark by an evasive lover. A brand new, slow-stepping and dramatic ballad". A reviewer from Music Week rated it two out of five, adding that "this clumsy and half-hearted ballad is unlikely to revive the Swedish outfit's Top 10 fortunes."

== Formats and track listings ==
All songs were written by Per Gessle except "Listen to Your Heart", with music by Gessle and Mats MP Persson.

- Cassette and CD single (Australia 8651894 · Europe 8651892 · Japan TOCP-8675)
1. "You Don't Understand Me" – 4:28
2. "Crazy About You" – 3:57
3. "Harleys & Indians (Riders in the Sky)" – 3:45
- UK cassette and CD1 (TCEM-418 · CDEMS-418)
1. "You Don't Understand Me" – 4:28
2. "The Look" (Abbey Road Version) – 3:46
3. "Listen to Your Heart" (Abbey Road Version) – 3:38
4. "You Don't Understand Me" (Abbey Road Version) – 3:43
- UK CD2 (CDEM-418)
1. "You Don't Understand Me" – 4:28
2. "Almost Unreal" (Demo, February 1993) – 3:25
3. "Harleys & Indians (Riders in the Sky)" – 3:45
4. "The Sweet Hello, The Sad Goodbye" – 4:47

== Personnel ==
Personnel are adapted from the liner notes of Don't Bore Us, Get to the Chorus! Roxette's Greatest Hits.

- Marie Fredriksson – all lead and background vocals
- Per Gessle – mixing
- Anders Herrlin – bass guitar, engineering and programming
- Michael Ilbert – engineering and mixing
- Christer Jansson – drums
- Clarence Öfwerman – keyboards, programming, production and mixing

== Charts ==
=== Weekly charts ===
Chart (1995–1996)	Peak position
Australia (ARIA)	115
Austria (Ö3 Austria Top 40)	25
Belgium (Ultratop 50 Flanders)	35
Canada Adult Contemporary (RPM)	18
Europe (Eurochart Hot 100)	29
Europe (European Hit Radio)	13
Finland (Suomen virallinen lista)	7
Germany (GfK)	44
Italy (Musica e dischi)	16
Italy Airplay (Music & Media)	6
Netherlands (Dutch Top 40)	20
Netherlands (Single Top 100)	19
Scottish Singles Sales (Official Charts)	35
Spain (AFYVE)	6
Sweden (Sverigetopplistan)	9
UK Singles (Official Charts)	42

=== Year-end charts ===
Chart (1995)	Position
Netherlands (Dutch Top 40)	164
Sweden (Topplistan)	58

== Release history ==
Region	Date	Format(s)	Label(s)	Ref.
Europe	2 October 1995	CD	EMI	
Japan	1 November 1995	CD	EMI	
Australia	20 November 1995	CD; cassette	EMI	
United Kingdom	11 March 1996	CD; cassette	EMI	

== "Tú No Me Comprendes" (2020) ==
"Tú No Me Comprendes"

Single by Roxette

from the album Bag of Trix
- B-side: "Let Your Heart Dance with Me"
- Released: 6 November 2020
- Length: 4:25
- Label: Roxette Recordings; Parlophone
- Songwriters: Per Gessle; Desmond Child; Luis Gómez-Escolar
- Producer: Clarence Öfwerman

Roxette singles chronology
"Let Your Heart Dance with Me" (2020)	"Tú No Me Comprendes" (2020)	"Piece of Cake" (2020)

Music video
- "Tú No Me Comprendes" on YouTube

Roxette released the Spanish-language compilation album Baladas en Español in 1996, which consisted of ballads translated by Spanish songwriter Luis Gómez-Escolar. The album was only released in Spanish and Portuguese-speaking territories. A translated version of "You Don't Understand Me", titled "Tú No Me Comprendes", was also recorded during these sessions, but was excluded from the album. Gessle explained: "We had too many songs [for Baladas en Español], so this was just hidden away somewhere."

While compiling the rarities compilation Bag of Trix in 2020, Gessle recalled recording a Spanish version of the track; the master tape of the recording was located within an EMI archival vault "in London or in Cologne". The version included on Bag of Trix is a new mix of the original recording. It was released as a single on digital and streaming platforms on 6 November 2020. This single contained their previous release, the Good Karma outtake "Let Your Heart Dance with Me", as the b-side.

=== Music video ===
A music video was created for the song, consisting of previously unseen footage from both Gessle and Fredriksson's private archives. It premiered on YouTube on 6 November.

=== Formats and track listings ===
"Tú No Me Comprendes" was written by Gessle, Child and Luis Gómez Escolar; "Let Your Heart Dance with Me" was written by Gessle.

1. "Tú No Me Comprendes" – 4:25
2. "Let Your Heart Dance with Me" – 3:07
