= Fotonovela (song) =

1984 single by Ivan

Single by Ivan

from the album Baila
- Language: Spanish
- B-side: "Cena fria"
- Released: 1984
- Genre: Synth-pop
- Length: 4:32
- Label: CBS
- Songwriters: Pedro Vidal; Luis Gómez-Escolar
- Producer: Pedro Vidal

Ivan singles chronology
"Bajo los Caracoles de Tus Cabellos" (1982)	"Fotonovela" (1984)	"Baila" (1985)

"Fotonovela" is a song by Spanish singer Ivan from his fourth studio album, Baila (1985). The song was co-written by Luis Gómez-Escolar and Pedro Vidal, and produced by Vidal. Upon its first release as a single in Spain in 1984, the song peaked at No. 14. The song reached the top 10 in France, Switzerland and West Germany, peaking at No. 3, No. 4 and No. 9, respectively. It also reached No. 28 in Belgium, No. 42 in Italy and No. 47 in the Netherlands.

== Track listing and formats ==
- Spanish 7-inch single

A. "Fotonovela (Capítulo I)" – 4:32
B. "Cena fria" – 3:59

- Spanish 12-inch maxi single

A. "Fotonovela (Capítulo II)" – 6:08
B1. "Cena fria" – 3:59
B2. "Fotonovela" (Instrumental) – 4:32

== Credits and personnel ==
- Ivan – vocals, arranger
- Pedro Vidal – songwriter, producer
- Luis Gómez-Escolar – songwriter
- Claudio D'Onofrio – programming, arranger
- Roberto Colombo – programming
- Franco Santamaria – arranger
- Giorgio Vanni – arranger
- Jesús N. Gómez – mixing

Credits and personnel adapted from the Baila album and 7-inch single liner notes.

== Charts ==
=== Weekly charts ===
Weekly chart performance for "Fotonovela"
Chart (1984–1985)	Peak position
Belgium (Ultratop 50 Flanders)	28
France (SNEP)	3
Netherlands (Single Top 100)	47
Switzerland (Schweizer Hitparade)	4
West Germany (GfK)	9

=== Year-end charts ===
Year-end chart performance for "Fotonovela"
Chart (1985)	Position
France (SNEP)	28
West Germany (Official German Charts)	56

== Certifications and sales ==
Certifications and sales for "Fotonovela"
Region	Certification	Certified units/sales
France (SNEP)	Silver	250,000^{*}
^{*} Sales figures based on certification alone.
