= Luis Gómez-Escolar =

Spanish songwriter (born 1949)

- Born: Luis Gómez-Escolar Roldán; 1949 (age 76–77); León, Spain
- Other name: Simone
- Occupation: Songwriter

Luis Gómez-Escolar Roldán (born 1949) is a Spanish lyricist, composer, producer, musician, and singer. He has written numerous songs, and the Spanish lyrics for many international hits. As a singer he has used the stage name Simone.

Together with Julio Seijas, they represented Spain in the OTI Festival 1982 as songwriters with the song "Ay, ay, amor", performed by La Pequeña Compañía, which placed second; and also represented Spain in the Eurovision Song Contest 1991 with the song "Bailar pegados", performed by Sergio Dalma, which placed fourth.

== Career ==
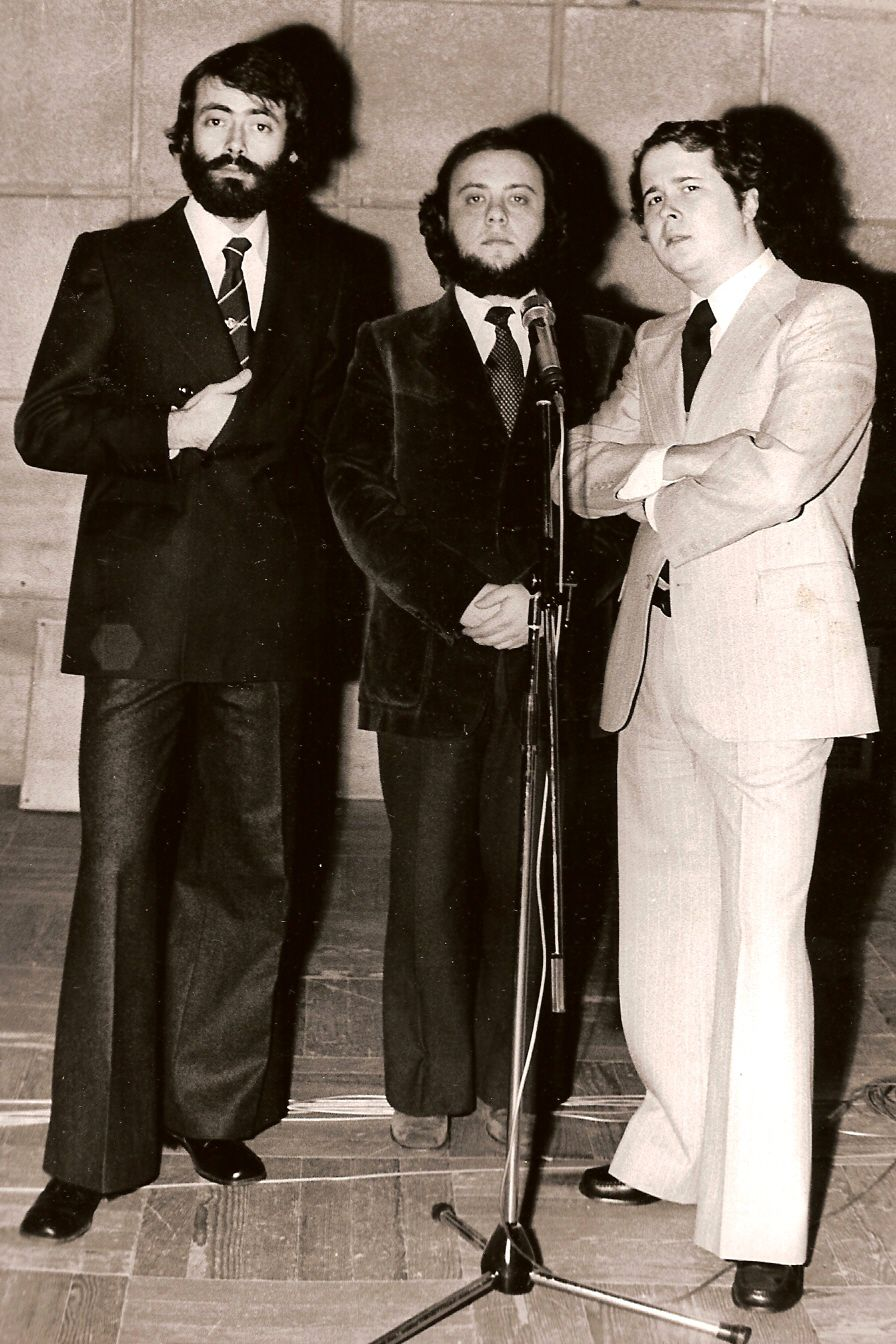
Left to right: Luis Gómez-Escolar, Julio Seijas, and Honorio Herrero.

He was part of the folk group Aguaviva while studying at university. After the group disbanded, he continued to collaborate with two other members Julio Seijas and Honorio Herrero.

First, she released a solo album under the stage name Simone, produced by Herrero and Seijas. Later, the three formed the satirical group La Charanga del Tío Honorio, and began writing songs for other artists with a similar style. During La Movida Madrileña, Gómez-Escolar decided to focus his career on songwriting, primarily lyrics.

Gómez-Escolar and Seijas represented Spain in the OTI Festival 1982 together as songwriters with the song "Ay, ay, amor", performed by La Pequeña Compañía, which placed second; and also represented Spain in the Eurovision Song Contest 1991 with the song "Bailar pegados", performed by Sergio Dalma, which placed fourth.

In 2004, the song "Más y más", written by Gómez-Escolar, Draco Rosa, and Itaal Shur, and performed by Draco Rosa himself, was nominated for Song of the Year at the 5th Annual Latin Grammy Awards. Gómez-Escolar has been nominated for the Latin Songwriters Hall of Fame in 2015, 2018, and 2019.

=== Songs ===
| Year | Song | Artist | Co-writer(s) |
|---|---|---|---|
| 1980 | "La quiero a morir" | Francis Cabrel | Francis Cabrel |
| 1981 | "Juntos" | Paloma San Basilio | Gianni Gastaldo |
| 1981 | "Será porque te amo" | Ricchi e Poveri | Enzo Ghinazzi; Daniele Pace; Dario Farina |
| 1982 | "Amor de hombre" | Mocedades | Reveriano Soutullo; Juan Vert |
| 1982 | "Ay, ay, amor" | La Pequeña Compañía | Julio Seijas |
| 1984 | "Me gustas tal como eres" | Sheena Easton and Luis Miguel | Juan Carlos Calderón |
| 1985 | "Fotonovela" | Iván | Pedro Vidal |
| 1987 | "Ahora te puedes marchar" | Luis Miguel | Ivor Raymonde; Mike Hawker |
| 1987 | "Es mi mujer" | Emmanuel | K. C. Porter |
| 1987 | "Daría cualquier cosa" | Jeanette | Julio Seijas |
| 1991 | "Bailar pegados" | Sergio Dalma | Julio Seijas |
| 1995 | "María" | Ricky Martin | K. C. Porter; Draco Rosa |
| 1995 | "Volverás" | Ricky Martin | K. C. Porter; Draco Rosa; Ricky Martin |
| 1995 | "Por ti volaré" | Andrea Bocelli | Francesco Sartori; Lucio Quarantotto |
| 1996 | "Fuego de noche, nieve de día" | Ricky Martin | K. C. Porter; Draco Rosa |
| 1996 | "Un día sin ti" | Roxette | Per Gessle; Mats Persson |
| 1996 | "Vivo por ella" | Andrea Bocelli | Gatto Panceri; Valerio Zelli |
| 1997 | "No sé si es amor" | Roxette | Per Gessle |
| 1998 | "La Bomba" | Ricky Martin | K. C. Porter; Draco Rosa |
| 1998 | "Casi un Bolero" | Ricky Martin | K. C. Porter; Draco Rosa |
| 1998 | "Perdido sin ti" | Ricky Martin | K. C. Porter; Draco Rosa |
| 1998 | "Corazonado" | Ricky Martin | K. C. Porter; Draco Rosa |
| 1998 | "Por arriba, por abajo" | Ricky Martin | Draco Rosa; César Lemos; Karla Aponte |
| 1998 | "The Cup of Life" | Ricky Martin | Desmond Child; Draco Rosa |
| 1999 | "Livin' la Vida Loca" (Spanish version) | Ricky Martin | Draco Rosa; Desmond Child |
| 2004 | "Más y más" | Draco Rosa | Draco Rosa; Itaal Shur |
| 2020 | "Tú no me comprendes" | Roxette | Per Gessle; Desmond Child |

=== Albums ===
| Year | Song | Artist |
|---|---|---|
| 1996 | Baladas en Español | Roxette |
| 1998 | Vuelve | Ricky Martin |
