= Laagendalsposten =

Regional newspaper in Norway

Laagendalsposten (lit. The Lågendal Post) is a regional newspaper for Kongsberg and the Numedal, in Buskerud, Norway. Its main office is in Kongsberg. The newspaper is printed in 10.500 copies and has about 50,000 readers.

Laagendalsposten was founded in 1903 by Karl A. Wad, and is now owned by the Mecom Group. The paper has 37 employees. The executive editor is Jørn Steinmoen (as of 2006).

In 2000 Laagendalsposten was the recipient of the European Newspaper Award in the category of local newspaper.
