= Let Your Heart Dance with Me =

Single by Roxette

from the album Bag of Trix
- Released: 2 October 2020
- Recorded: 2016
- Studio: Aerosol Grey Machine, Scania
- Genre: Pop
- Length: 3:07
- Label: Roxette Recordings; Parlophone
- Songwriter(s): Per Gessle
- Producer(s): Clarence Öfwerman; Christoffer Lundquist; Gessle; Addeboy vs. Cliff

Roxette singles chronology
"Why Don't You Bring Me Flowers?" (2016)	"Let Your Heart Dance with Me" (2020)	"Tú No Me Comprendes" (2020)

Music video
- "Let Your Heart Dance with Me" on YouTube

"Let Your Heart Dance with Me" is a song by Swedish pop music duo Roxette, released on 2 October 2020 as the second single from their compilation album Bag of Trix. The song was written by Per Gessle, and contains vocals by Marie Fredriksson. The track was released on a limited edition gold-coloured 7" vinyl, which was limited to 1,500 copies worldwide and contained their previous single – a cover of the Beatles song "Help!", recorded live at Abbey Road Studios on 15 November 1995 – as the b-side. A music video was also released for the song, featuring previously unseen footage from both Gessle and Fredriksson's private archives.

== Background and recording ==
The track was originally recorded in 2016 for Roxette's tenth studio album Good Karma, with songwriter Per Gessle saying it was his intention to compose a "classic and simple 'clap your hands and stomp your feet' song" while writing the track. However, the song was not finished in time to be included on Good Karma. Gessle said that "as usual we already had so many strong contenders that [the song] had to wait for a second chance. And when the idea for [Bag of Trix] came up, it was a given." Bag of Trix, a 3-disc compilation of previously unreleased material, also features a second track originally recorded for Good Karma, "Piece of Cake".

"Let Your Heart Dance With Me" was one of the final vocals Marie Fredriksson recorded for Roxette, in 2016, before her death in December 2019. She was advised by her doctors to cease all touring activity due to poor health two months before Good Karma was released. Gessle said: "We cancelled the [2016] summer tour and all future commitments. But even a studio recording was demanding for her. She wanted so much, but really had to fight to get it out. And she did. Marie was a real trooper to the very end." The track was mixed by Ronny Lahti, who also mixed Roxette's 2001 album Room Service.

== Release and promotion ==
A music video for the track was created using footage from Gessle and Fredriksson's private archives. The video premiered on 1 October 2020 on YouTube. Immediately following the broadcast, Roxette's YouTube channel hosted a live Q&A session with Gessle, where he answered questions submitted by fans. "Let Your Heart Dance with Me" was released as a limited edition 7" vinyl on 9 October 2020. This vinyl was gold-coloured and limited to 1,500 copies worldwide, and contained their previous single – a cover of the Beatles song "Help!" that Roxette recorded live at Abbey Road Studios on 15 November 1995 – as the b-side.

== Critical reception ==
A writer for Swedish newspaper Aftonbladet described the song as "light-hearted and optimistic", but said it was inappropriate for inclusion on Good Karma. Their writer elaborated that although the track was an "easy listen, at first", each subsequent listen revealed it to be "more and more a tribute to Marie Fredriksson." They complimented the "acoustic guitars and carefree whistles", saying that these elements gave the song the impression of a "duo that took a last-minute burst of heat, settled down on a sandy beach and talked about old memories until sunset. But if you listen carefully, you are still struck by a strong melancholy." They went on to describe the song as a fitting tribute to Fredriksson, complimenting Gessle for making it "feel like a tribute to their friendship and a thank you to Marie: 'You made it possible / By being beautiful / And so incredible'; he sings but then turns to a more melancholy appeal: 'Let your heart dance with me / Let me see you smile again'." The German edition of Rolling Stone called it a "strikingly optimistic song, although it was recorded at a time when Marie Fredriksson's health problems were being intensified as a result of ten years of recurrent cancer treatment." Similarly, Classic Pop described it as a track that "radiates summer, sun and optimism", despite Fredriksson's health status at the time of its recording.

== Formats and track listing ==
"Let Your Heart Dance with Me" written by Per Gessle; "Help!" written by John Lennon and Paul McCartney

- Digital download
1. "Let Your Heart Dance with Me" – 3:07
- 7" vinyl (50541 970802–1 9)
1. "Let Your Heart Dance with Me" – 3:07
2. "Help!" (Abbey Road Sessions, 15 November 1995) – 2:56

== Credits and personnel ==
Credits adapted from the liner notes of the 7" single and Tidal.

- "Let Your Heart Dance With Me" recorded at Aerosol Grey Machine, Vallarum, Scania in 2016
- "Help!" recorded at Abbey Road Studios on 15 November 1995

Musicians

- Marie Fredriksson – lead and background vocals
- Per Gessle – lead and background vocals and production
- Jonas Isacsson – guitar (track 2)
- Christoffer Lundquist – background vocals, programming, engineering and production
- Clarence Öfwerman – keyboards, programming, production and mixing

Technical

- Addeboy vs. Cliff – production (track 1)
- Wickholm Formavd. – sleeve design
- Emmelie Hedenström – photography
- Ronny Lahti – mixing (track 1)
- Alar Suurna – engineering and mixing (track 2)

== Charts ==
Chart (2020–2021)	Peak position
Croatian Airplay (HRT)	85
Slovakia (Rádio Top 100)	87
