= Baladas en Español =

Compilation album by Roxette
- Released: 21 October 1996
- Recorded: 1987–1996
- Genre: Pop
- Length: 51:50
- Language: Spanish
- Label: EMI
- Producer: Clarence Öfwerman

Roxette chronology
Don't Bore Us, Get to the Chorus! (1995)	Baladas en Español (1996)	Have a Nice Day (1999)

Singles from Baladas en español
- 1. "Un Día Sin Ti" Released: 29 October 1996; 2. "No Sé Si Es Amor" Released: 28 January 1997

Baladas en Español (transl. Ballads in Spanish) is a Spanish language compilation album by Swedish pop duo Roxette, released on 21 October 1996 by EMI. The compilation was only issued in Spanish and Portuguese-speaking territories. It was a commercial success upon release, peaking in the top ten of several national record charts, and was certified gold or platinum in numerous territories, namely Argentina, Brazil, Mexico and Spain. As of 2001, the record sold in excess of 1.2 million copies worldwide.

"Un Día Sin Ti" and "No Sé Si Es Amor" were released as commercial singles, though most songs on the album would go on to receive substantial amounts of airplay on Latin American and Spanish radio.

== Composition and style ==
The album consists of twelve of Roxette's ballads and downtempo tracks, translated into Spanish by songwriter Luis Gómez-Escolar, of whom very little is known. Escolar's translations have been criticised by both fans and media for being poorly representative of the original English lyrics, as well as for being overly-simplistic and juvenile.

== Release ==
Baladas en Español was released on 21 October 1996, exclusively in Spanish and Portuguese-speaking territories. However, it was also released in the US by EMI Latin, making it the final Roxette album to be officially issued in the country. The record was preceded by the release of "Un Día Sin Ti" as its lead single, which reached the top ten of Billboard's Latin Pop Songs. The song also charted on the national airplay chart of Spain. Its music video was directed by Jonas Åkerlund. "No Sé Si Es Amor" was released as the album's second and final single in January 1997, peaking at number six in Spain. "Soy una Mujer" was released as a promotional single exclusively in Mexico in July 1997.

The album was a commercial success upon release, and has been certified double platinum in Spain (indicating shipments of over 200,000 units), platinum in Argentina and Brazil (for 60,000 and 250,000 copies, respectively), and gold (100,000 copies) in Mexico. As of 2001, Baladas en Español has sold over 1.2 million copies worldwide, and just over 13,000 copies in the US.

In 2022, an edition subtitled the "complete collection" was added to music streaming and download services, adding Spanish translations of three songs from the band's following album, Have a Nice Day, and "Tú No Me Comprendes", an outtake from the original version of the album.

== Track listing ==
All lyrics are written by Per Gessle and adapted to Spanish by Luis Gómez-Escolar, except where noted; all music is composed by Gessle, except where noted.

Original edition
No.	Title	Music	English translation	Length
1.	"Un Día sin Ti" ("Spending My Time")	Gessle; Mats "MP" Persson	"A Day Without You"	4:38
2.	"Crash! Boom! Bang!"			4:26
3.	"Directamente a Ti" ("Run to You")		"Right to You"	3:30
4.	"No Sé Si Es Amor" ("It Must Have Been Love")		"I Don't Know If It's Love"	4:41
5.	"Cuánto lo Siento" ("I'm Sorry")		"I'm So Sorry"	3:13
6.	"Tímida" ("Vulnerable")		"Timid"	4:44
7.	"Habla el Corazón" ("Listen to Your Heart")	Gessle; Persson	"The Heart Speaks"	5:09
8.	"Como la Lluvia en el Cristal" ("Watercolours in the Rain")	Marie Fredriksson	"Like Rain on the Glass"	3:42
9.	"Soy una Mujer" ("Fading Like a Flower")		"I'm a Woman"	3:45
10.	"Quiero Ser como Tú" ("I Don't Want to Get Hurt")		"I Want to Be Like You"	4:16
11.	"Una Reina Va Detrás de un Rey" ("Queen of Rain")	Gessle; Persson	"A Queen Goes After a King"	4:51
12.	"El Día del Amor" ("Perfect Day")	Gessle; Persson	"The Day of Love"	3:55
Total length:				51:50

Complete collection
No.	Title	Lyrics	Music	English translation	Length
1.	"Un Día sin Ti"		Gessle; Persson		4:39
2.	"Habla el Corazón"		Gessle; Persson		5:11
3.	"Soy una Mujer"				3:48
4.	"No Sé Si Es Amor"				4:42
5.	"Directamente a Ti"				3:32
6.	"Crash! Boom! Bang!" (Spanish version)				4:27
7.	"Cuánto lo Siento"				3:15
8.	"Alguien" ("Anyone")			"Anyone"	4:31
9.	"Tímida"				4:46
10.	"Tú No Me Comprendes" ("You Don't Understand Me")	Gessle; Desmond Child	Gessle; Child	"You Don't Understand Me"	4:25
11.	"Quisiera Volar" ("Wish I Could Fly")			"I'd Like to Fly"	4:41
12.	"Como la Lluvia en el Cristal"				3:42
13.	"Lo Siento" ("Salvation")			"I'm Sorry"	4:43
14.	"Queiro Ser como Tú"				4:18
15.	"Una Reina Va Detrás de un Rey"		Gessle; Persson		4:52
16.	"El Día del Amor"		Gessle; Persson		3:58

== Personnel ==
Credits adapted from the liner notes of Baladas en Español.

- Roxette are Per Gessle and Marie Fredriksson
- Recorded at Tits & Ass Studio in Halmstad, Sweden; EMI Studios and Polar Studios in Stockholm, Sweden; Mayfair Studios in London, England and Capri Digital Studios in Capri, Italy between 1987 and 1996.
- All songs published by Jimmy Fun Music, except: "Watercolours in the Rain" published by Shock the Music/Jimmy Fun Music
- All songs produced by Clarence Öfwerman
- Mastered by Alar Suurna at Polar Studios

Musicians

- Marie Fredriksson – lead and background vocals
- Per Gessle – lead and background vocals, mixing
- Pelle Alsing – drums
- Bo Eriksson – oboe ("Queen of Rain")
- Anders Herrlin – bass guitar, programming, engineering
- Jonas Isacsson – acoustic and electric guitars
- Christer Jansson – drums
- Clarence Öfwerman – keyboards and production; string arrangements and conducting ("Perfect Day")
- Kjell Öhman – accordion ("Perfect Day")
- Mats "M.P." Persson – acoustic and electric guitars
- Pelle Sirén – acoustic and electric guitars

Technical

- Kjell Andersson – sleeve design
- Kevin Davies – photography
- Mats Holmquist – string arrangements and conducting ("I Don't Want to Get Hurt")
- Michael Ilbert – engineering, mixing
- Henrik Jansson – string arrangements and conducting ("Watercolours in the Rain")
- Jonas Linell – photography
- Lars Nordin – photography
- Alar Suurna – engineering

== Charts ==
Chart (1996–97)	Peak position
Argentine Monthly Albums (CAPIF)	6
Portuguese Albums (AFP)	6
Spanish Albums (Promúsicae)	8

Chart (2026)	Peak position
Croatian International Albums (HDU)	7
Hungarian Physical Albums (MAHASZ)	11
Swedish Albums (Sverigetopplistan)	42

== Certifications ==
Region	Certification	Certified units/sales
Argentina (CAPIF)	Platinum	60,000^{^}
Brazil (Pro-Música Brasil)	Platinum	250,000^{*}
Mexico (AMPROFON)	Gold	100,000^{^}
Spain (Promusicae)	2× Platinum	200,000^{^}
United States	—	13,000
Summaries
Worldwide		1,200,000
^{*} Sales figures based on certification alone.^{^} Shipments figures based on certification alone.
