= Tourism (Roxette album) =

1992 studio album by Roxette

Tourism: Songs from Studios, Stages, Hotelrooms & Other Strange Places

Studio album with live tracks by Roxette
- Released: 28 August 1992
- Recorded: September 1987 – July 1992
- Venues: Sydney Entertainment Centre (Sydney); San Carlos Stadium (Santiago); The 150 Nightclub (São Paulo); Alvear Palace Hotel (Buenos Aires); Hallenstadion (Zürich)
- Studios: Tits & Ass (Halmstad); EMI (Stockholm); Nas Nuvens Recording (Rio de Janeiro); Ocean Way Recording (Los Angeles); Medley (Copenhagen)
- Genres: Pop; rock
- Length: 70:37
- Label: EMI
- Producer: Clarence Öfwerman

Roxette chronology
Joyride (1991)	Tourism: Songs from Studios, Stages, Hotelrooms & Other Strange Places (1992)	Crash! Boom! Bang! (1994)

Singles from Tourism
- 1. "How Do You Do!" Released: 3 July 1992; 2. "Queen of Rain" Released: 26 October 1992; 3. "Fingertips '93" Released: 26 January 1993

Tourism: Songs from Studios, Stages, Hotelrooms & Other Strange Places is the fourth studio album by Swedish pop duo Roxette, released on 28 August 1992 by EMI. Despite often being mistaken for a live album, the record was described by Roxette in its liner notes as a "tour album": the band recorded the majority of its material in numerous recording studios in between live dates of their worldwide Join the Joyride! Tour. The album contains three live concert recordings, while another track was recorded live in an empty nightclub in São Paulo. A further two songs were recorded in Buenos Aires' Alvear Palace Hotel.

The album received mixed reviews from American publications upon release, with several of them confused over its concept and incorrectly describing it as containing just five previously unreleased songs. It also underperformed on the Billboard 200, peaking at number 117 on the chart and selling approximately 278,000 copies—far short of the million-selling Joyride. Nevertheless, the album was a commercial success in Europe and was certified platinum in numerous territories. As of 2001, Tourism had sold over six million copies worldwide.

== Background and recording ==
Tourism was described by Roxette in the album's liner notes as a "tour album, [...] not a live album". It consists of songs recorded by the band in various locations during the "Join the Joyride! Tour". The idea was to "create and collect material along the way; to record our music in different environments in different parts of the world; to take advantage of the excitement and the energy within the band on a tour like this." It does contain several live recordings, including versions of "The Look" and "Joyride" taken from their 13 December 1991 performance at the Sydney Entertainment Centre, as well as an acoustic version of Joyride album track "Things Will Never Be the Same" from a November 1991 concert in Zürich. A portion of a live performance of "It Must Have Been Love" from their 25 April 1992 concert at San Carlos Stadium in Santiago, Chile is used as an intro to a new studio recording of the song. This new version was recorded in Ocean Way Recording Studios in March 1992, and features k.d. lang guitarist Greg Leisz performing pedal steel guitar. Also recorded there was new song "The Heart Shaped Sea", which again features Leisz.

"Silver Blue"
Album version of "Silver Blue", the oldest song on the album. It was originally recorded in September 1987 and appeared as the b-side to "The Look".

The band recorded several songs while touring in Latin America in May 1992. Two songs were recorded in Brazil: the album's third single, "Fingertips", was recorded in Nas Nuvens Recording Studio in Rio de Janeiro; "Never Is a Long Time" was recorded live in an empty nightclub in São Paulo. "Here Comes the Weekend" and a new version of "So Far Away" – originally released on their 1986 debut Pearls of Passion – were recorded live in room 603 of the Alvear Palace Hotel in Buenos Aires, Argentina, on 4 May 1992. Two other previously released studio recordings are included on the album: "Silver Blue" was originally released as a b-side to "The Look" in 1988; "Come Back (Before You Leave)" appeared on the "Joyride" single in 1991.

The majority of the remaining tracks were recorded at EMI Studios in Stockholm between late March and early April 1992, with the exception of "Cinnamon Street", which was overdubbed at Medley Studios in Copenhagen, Denmark, on 6 July. The album's second single, "Queen of Rain", was recorded in July 1990 in Stockholm during the sessions for Joyride. It was originally set to appear as that album's final track, but was later excluded in favour of "Perfect Day". However, the closing notes and sound effects of the Joyride version of "Things Will Never Be the Same" – that album's second-last song – can still be heard over the crowd noise on the intro of "Queen of Rain". Until 2011's Charm School and 2016's Good Karma, Tourism was the first and only Roxette album to not contain any material composed by Marie Fredriksson, who would release her fourth Swedish-language solo album, Den ständiga resan, just five weeks after Tourism was released.

Recording locations of the album, showing the worldwide nature. Red dots indicate studio recordings, green dots are live performances.
Tourism (Roxette album) (South America)
Tourism (Roxette album) (Northern and Central Europe)

== Critical reception ==
Professional ratings
Review scores
Source	Rating
AllMusic	3/5 stars
Billboard	(favorable)
Calgary Herald	C
Encyclopedia of Popular Music	3/5 stars
Entertainment Weekly	B−
Los Angeles Times	2.5/4 stars

The album received generally positive reviews upon release. A review for Billboard complimented the album for abandoning the "production glitz" of past work, while Bryan Buss of AllMusic said that the album "spotlights how strong an act they are even without the benefit of studio production." He praised the re-recorded version of "It Must Have Been Love", saying "you have to hear 45,000 Chilean fans singing back-up to truly appreciate what was one of their least affecting ballads", and said that the album demonstrates "what true pop craftsmanship is." He compared the album to Joyride, saying that both releases contained very little filler, before summarising that Tourism was "Not quite a greatest hits package, this is your best bet as an introduction to Roxette."

Dennis Hunt of Los Angeles Times, who incorrectly described the album as containing just five new songs, praised Fredriksson's vocals. He referred to her as being "one of pop's best and most underrated singers", but said that the material on Tourism was "beneath her talents". He awarded the album two-and-a-half stars out of four, highlighting her performance for transforming "low-grade fluff into passable–often delectable–pop." Entertainment Weekly referred to the album as a "stopgap measure between discs", but said that the "catchy and pop-savvy Tourism ain't half bad", awarding the album a grade of B−.

== Commercial performance ==
Though not matching the success of the duo's previous studio albums, Tourism had sold in excess of 6 million copies worldwide. The album had little impact on American music charts, peaking at number 117 on the Billboard 200—in stark contrast to Joyride, which peaked at number 12 on the same chart. As of January 2009, it had sold 278,000 copies in the US. It peaked at number 18 on the national RPM albums chart in Canada, where it has been certified platinum by Music Canada (formerly the Canadian Recording Industry Association) for shipments in excess of 100,000 units.

It did far better elsewhere, especially in Europe, topping the European Top 100 Albums chart for four consecutive weeks in September 1992. In the duo's native Sweden, the album spent two weeks at number one and was certified triple platinum by the Swedish Recording Industry Association for shipments in excess of 300,000 units. It also topped the charts in other Nordic countries, including Denmark, Finland and Norway. The album was a massive commercial success in Germany, spending five consecutive weeks at number one there. It was certified triple gold by the Bundesverband Musikindustrie (BVMI) for shipments in excess of 750,000 units. The album debuted at number two on the UK Albums Chart, where it was held off the top spot by Mike Oldfield's Tubular Bells II. It spent 17 weeks on the chart, and was certified gold by the British Phonographic Industry (BPI) in September 1992, denoting shipments in excess of 100,000 copies.

== Track listing ==
All lyrics are written by Per Gessle, except "So Far Away" by Gessle and Hasse Huss; all music is composed by Gessle, except "Queen of Rain" by Gessle and Mats MP Persson and "Hotblooded" by Marie Fredriksson and Gessle.

Tourism: Songs from Studios, Stages, Hotelrooms & Other Strange Places – Original release
No.	Title	Recorded	Length
1.	"How Do You Do!"	Tits & Ass Studio, Halmstad (April 1992); EMI Studios, Stockholm (May 1992)	3:09
2.	"Fingertips"	Nas Nuvens Studio, Rio de Janeiro (May 1992)	3:33
3.	"The Look" (Live)	Sydney Entertainment Centre, Sydney (13 December 1991)	5:32
4.	"The Heart Shaped Sea"	Ocean Way Recording, Los Angeles (March 1992)	4:32
5.	"The Rain"	EMI Studios, Stockholm (June 1992)	4:49
6.	"Keep Me Waiting"	EMI Studios, Stockholm (May 1992)	3:15
7.	"It Must Have Been Love"	San Carlos de Apoquindo Stadium, Santiago (live intro: 25 April 1992); Ocean Way Recording, LA (studio recording: March 1992)	7:05
8.	"Cinnamon Street"	EMI Studios, Stockholm (April 1992); Medley Studios, Copenhagen (6 July 1992)	5:00
9.	"Never Is a Long Time"	The 150 Nightclub, São Paulo (16 May 1992)	3:46
10.	"Silver Blue"	EMI Studios, Stockholm (September 1987, May 1988 and April 1992)	4:06
11.	"Here Comes the Weekend"	Room 603, Alvear Palace Hotel, Buenos Aires (4 May 1992)	4:10
12.	"So Far Away"	Room 603, Alvear Palace Hotel, Buenos Aires (4 May 1992)	4:02
13.	"Come Back (Before You Leave)"	EMI Studios, Stockholm (April and May 1990)	4:40
14.	"Things Will Never Be the Same" (Live)	Hallenstadion, Zürich (November 1991)	3:12
15.	"Joyride" (Live)	Sydney Entertainment Centre, Sydney (13 December 1991)	4:48
16.	"Queen of Rain"	EMI Studios, Stockholm (June 1990)	4:50
Total length:			70:37

Tourism – 2009 reissue (CD bonus tracks)
No.	Title	Length
17.	"Fingertips '93" (single version)	3:40
18.	"2 Cinnamon Street"	5:06
Total length:		79:23

Tourism – 2009 reissue (iTunes bonus tracks)
No.	Title	Length
19.	"Fading Like a Flower (Every Time You Leave)" (Live from the Sydney Entertainment Centre on 13 December 1991)	4:09
20.	"Paint" (Live from the Sydney Entertainment Centre on 13 December 1991)	3:34
21.	"It Must Have Been Love" (Live from the Sydney Entertainment Centre on 13 December 1991)	5:29
22.	"Dressed for Success" (Live from the Sydney Entertainment Centre on 13 December 1991)	4:46
23.	"Hotblooded" (Live from the Sydney Entertainment Centre on 13 December 1991)	3:54
Total length:		101:15

Tourism – 30th anniversary edition (disc two)
No.	Title	Length
1.	"Fingertips '93"	3:40
2.	"2 Cinnamon Street"	5:06
3.	"How Do You Do!" (T&A Demo, 4 April 1992)	3:16
4.	"Never Is a Long Time" (Torsgatan Piano Demo, 24 September 1987)	4:12
5.	"Here Comes the Weekend" (T&A Demo, 30 March 1988)	4:12
6.	"Fingertips" (T&A Demo, 28 January 1992)	3:26
7.	"Silver Blue" (T&A Demo, 21 May 1987)	3:58
8.	"The Heart Shaped Sea #1" (T&A Demo, 25 April 1991)	4:19
9.	"Never Is a Long Time" (EMI Demo, 26-30 May 1987)	3:50
10.	"The Rain" (T&A Demo, 29 December 1991)	4:43
11.	"Keep Me Waiting" (T&A Demo, 18 August 1990)	3:14
12.	"Come Back (Before You Leave)" (T&A Demo, 8 April 1990)	3:27
13.	"Queen of Rain" (T&A Demo, 2 January 1990)	4:27
14.	"Cinnamon Street" (T&A Demo, 2 January 1992)	4:45
15.	"Never Is a Long Time" (T&A Demo, 11 November 1987)	3:48
16.	"Silver Blue" (EMI Demo, 26-30 May 1987)	4:12
17.	"The Heart Shaped Sea #2" (T&A Demo, May 1991)	4:08

== Personnel ==
Credits adapted from the liner notes of Tourism.

- Roxette are Per Gessle and Marie Fredriksson
- Recorded at various locations between September 1987 and July 1992
- Mastered by Ted Jensen at Sterling Sound Studios, New York City
- Remastered by Alar Suurna at Polar Studio, Stockholm (2009 reissue)
- All songs published by Jimmy Fun Music, except: "Hotblooded" by Shock the Music/Jimmy Fun Music

Musicians

- Marie Fredriksson – lead and background vocals; piano (track 7); liner notes
- Per Gessle – lead and background vocals; acoustic guitar (tracks 2, 4, 12, 14); rhythm guitar (tracks 3, 15); harmonica (track 7); mixing; liner notes
- Per "Pelle" Alsing – drums (tracks 1, 3, 6–8, 10, 15); percussion (track 4); Samsonite suitcase (track 11)
- Vicki Benckert – backing vocals (tracks 1, 3, 8); accordion (tracks 11–12); percussion (track 15)
- Bo Eriksson – oboe (track 16)
- Anders Herrlin – engineering (tracks 1, 5–7, 9, 11–13, 16); programming (tracks 1, 5–6, 13, 16); bass guitar
- Jonas Isacsson – mandolin (tracks 1, 4, 9); acoustic and electric guitars
- Greg Leisz – pedal steel guitar (tracks 4, 7)
- Mia Lindgren – backing vocals (tracks 5, 7)
- Clarence Öfwerman – programming (tracks 5, 10, 13, 16); piano (tracks 11–12); keyboards; production; mixing
- Staffan Öfwerman – backing vocals (tracks 1, 3, 5, 7–8); percussion (tracks 1, 3, 15); tambourine (track 2)
- Mats "MP" Persson – engineering (track 1); acoustic guitar (track 4)
- Alar Suurna – maracas (track 5); tambourine (tracks 6, 8); engineering; mixing

Technical

- Kjell Andersson – sleeve design
- Henry Diltz – photography
- Mattias Edwall – photography
- Lennart Haglund – engineer (tracks 1, 5–6, 13, 16)
- Patrick Hanson – engineer (tracks 3, 15)
- Paulo Junqueiro – engineer (track 2)
- Antoine Midani – assistant engineer (track 2)
- Matt Murray – photography
- Oli Poulsen – engineer (track 8)
- Rail Rogut – assistant engineer (track 4, 7)
- Mike Ross – engineer (tracks 4, 7)

== Charts ==
=== Weekly charts ===
Weekly chart performance for Tourism
Chart (1992)	Peak; position
Australian Albums (ARIA)	3
Austrian Albums (Ö3 Austria)	2
Belgian Albums (IFPI)	1
Canada Top Albums/CDs (RPM)	18
Danish Albums (Hitlisten)	1
Dutch Albums (Album Top 100)	2
European Albums (Music & Media)	1
Finnish Albums (Suomen virallinen lista)	1
German Albums (Offizielle Top 100)	1
Greek Albums (IFPI)	2
Hungarian Albums (MAHASZ)	4
Irish Albums (IFPI)	10
Italian Albums (Musica e dischi)	10
Japanese Albums (Oricon)	13
New Zealand Albums (RMNZ)	27
Norwegian Albums (VG-lista)	1
Portuguese Albums (AFP)	8
Spanish Albums (AFYVE)	5
Swedish Albums (Sverigetopplistan)	1
Swiss Albums (Schweizer Hitparade)	1
UK Albums (Official Charts)	2
US Billboard 200	117

=== Year-end charts ===
Year-end chart performance for Tourism
Chart (1992)	Position
Argentina Foreign Albums (CAPIF)	6
Australian Albums (ARIA)	40
Austrian Albums (Ö3 Austria)	30
Canada Top Albums/CDs (RPM)	96
Dutch Albums (Album Top 100)	49
European Albums (Music & Media)	21
German Albums (Offizielle Top 100)	22
Swiss Albums (Schweizer Hitparade)	29
UK Albums (OCC)	72

== Certifications and sales ==
Certifications and sales for Tourism
Region	Certification	Certified units/sales
Argentina	—	171,058
Australia (ARIA)	Platinum	70,000^{^}
Austria (IFPI Austria)	Platinum	50,000^{*}
Canada (Music Canada)	Platinum	100,000^{^}
Finland (Musiikkituottajat)	Gold	43,423
Germany (BVMI)	3× Gold	750,000^{^}
Netherlands (NVPI)	Platinum	100,000^{^}
Spain (Promusicae)	Platinum	100,000^{^}
Sweden (GLF)	3× Platinum	300,000^{^}
Switzerland (IFPI Switzerland)	Platinum	50,000^{^}
United Kingdom (BPI)	Gold	100,000^{^}
United States	—	278,000
Summaries
Worldwide	—	6,000,000
^{*} Sales figures based on certification alone.^{^} Shipments figures based on certification alone.
