= Ivan (singer) =

Spanish singer

Juan Carlos Ramos Vaquero (born 17 July 1962), known by his stage name Ivan, is a Spanish singer. He was discovered by CBS producer Oscar Gómez, and recorded a self-titled album, Iván. His first single was "Sin amor" ("Without Love") from 1979. In the 1980s, he sold over 5 million albums. He recorded a number of songs with José Luis Perales. He had hit songs in Mexico, Colombia, Ecuador and Chile before his career was interrupted by his compulsory military service. He released the album Fotonovela in 2012, which included a remake of his song of the same name.

Sources differ on his birth date with some identifying 1959 and others 1962. His daughter is Nathalia Ramos who is an actress in Hollywood films.

== Discography ==
=== Albums ===
- Sin Amor (1979)
- A Solas (1980)
- Tiempo de Ivan (1982)
- Baila (1985)
- Hey! Mademoiselle! (1986)
- Mas Dificil (1988)
- Vuelta a Casa (1992)
- Fotonovela (2000, compilation)
- Sus Cuatro Primeros Discos en CBS (1979-1986) (2004, compilation)
- Grandes Exitos (2004, compilation)

=== Singles ===
Year	Single	Peak chart positions						
Year	Single	BE (FLA)	ESP	FRA	GER	IT	NL	SUI
1979	"Sin Amor"	-	1	-	-	-	-	-
1979	"Loco" (Mexico-only release)	-	-	-	-	-	-	-
1980	"Soñarte"	-	4	-	-	-	-	-
1981	"Te Agradezco"	-	-	-	-	-	-	-
1981	"Te Quiero Tanto"	-	1	-	-	-	-	-
1982	"Oh Gaby (Oh, Gaby, Gaby)"	-	19	-	-	-	-	-
1982	"Bajo los Caracoles de Tus Cabellos"	-	-	-	-	-	-	-
1984	"Fotonovela"	28	14	3	9	42	47	4
1985	"Baila"	-	1	12	-	-	37	26
1985	"Ya No Puedo Detenerme"	-	-	-	-	-	-	-
1985	"Pon la Radio"	-	-	-	-	-	-	-
1986	"Cristal (One Day)" (Peru-only release)	-	-	-	-	-	-	-
1986	"Hey Mademoiselle"	-	20	-	-	-	-	-
1986	"Starman"	-	-	-	-	-	-	-
1986	"Un Dia Mas" (Ecuador-only release)	-	-	-	-	-	-	-
1988	"OA"	-	-	-	-	-	-	-
1992	"Salvame" (Promo)	-	-	-	-	-	-	-
1992	"Bailar Con la Luna" (Promo)	-	-	-	-	-	-	-
