= How Do You Do! =

1992 single by Roxette

Single by Roxette

from the album Tourism
- Released: 3 July 1992
- Recorded: April–May 1992
- Studio: Tits & Ass (Halmstad, Sweden); EMI (Stockholm, Sweden)
- Genre: Pop rock
- Length: 3:09
- Label: EMI
- Songwriter: Per Gessle
- Producer: Clarence Öfwerman

Roxette singles chronology
"Church of Your Heart" (1992)	"How Do You Do!" (1992)	"Queen of Rain" (1992)

Music video
- "How Do You Do!" on YouTube

"How Do You Do!" is a song by Swedish pop duo Roxette. It was released as the lead single from their fourth studio album Tourism on 3 July 1992 by EMI Records. The track, written by Per Gessle and produced by Clarence Öfwerman, was a commercial success upon release, topping the Norwegian Singles Chart and peaking at number two in several countries, including Austria, Belgium, Finland, Germany, the Netherlands, Sweden and Switzerland. The single was backed by several remixes created by Swedish production duo BomKrash, which consisted of Jacob Hellner and Carl-Michael Herlöfsson.

== Composition and style ==
According to Ultimate Guitar, "How Do You Do!" is an uptempo pop rock song written in common time with a tempo of 121 beats per minute. It utilises a common trait found in Roxette compositions of the verse using a different key signature than the chorus. The verse is composed in C, and consists of three repetitions of a basic C–F–G–F sequence, followed by one shortened sequence of C–F–G. The pre-chorus makes use of a power chord structure, and consists of a sequence of Am–G–F–C–Em, which is then amended to Am–G–F–G. Following a brief pause, Marie Fredriksson takes over lead vocals for the song's chorus, which moves up from the verses by two keys to E♭. The chorus is composed almost entirely of sharp notes, and follows a sequence of D♯–A♯–D♯–G♯–A♯–Cm–G♯–A♯–Cm–G♯–A♯. The bridge consists of four short repetitions of Cm–A♯, played as power chords. The last chorus and outro are in F, following the transposed sequence F-C-F-B♭-C-Dm-B♭-C-Dm-B♭-C. American musician Tiny Tim is referenced in the song's lyrics.

== Critical reception ==
In his review of Tourism, AllMusic editor Bryan Buss wrote that "How Do You Do!" is a "perfectly presented pop ditty, bright and sunny as summer". Larry Flick from Billboard magazine described the song as a "peppy, guitar-anchored pop/rocker." He noted that "bopping pogo beats and Per Gessle's highly attitudinal lead vocal are strongest points in luring radio programmers." Gavin Report called it a "fun track" that "starts off with a froggy-voiced Per Gessle posing the most asked question in the English language."

== Formats and track listings ==
- Cassette and 7-inch single (Europe 8650027)
1. "How Do You Do!" – 3:09
2. "Fading Like a Flower (Every Time You Leave)" (live from the Sydney Entertainment Centre on 13 December 1991) – 4:09
- 12-inch single (Europe 8650026)
1. "How Do You Do!" (7-inch version) – 3:12
2. "Knockin' on Every Door" (BomKrash 7-inch remix) – 3:51
3. "How Do You Do!" (BomKrash 12-inch remix) – 5:43
- CD single (Europe and Australia 8650022 · UK CDEM-241)
1. "How Do You Do!" (7-inch version) – 3:12
2. "Fading Like a Flower (Every Time You Leave)" (live from Sydney) – 4:09
3. "Knockin' on Every Door" (BomKrash 12-inch remix) – 6:05
4. "How Do You Do!" (BomKrash 12-inch remix) – 5:43
- US CD single (E2-56252)
1. "How Do You Do!" (7-inch version) – 3:12
2. "How Do You Do!" (BomKrash US edit) – 3:11
3. "Fading Like a Flower (Every Time You Leave)" (live from Sydney) – 4:09

== Credits and personnel ==
Credits are adapted from the liner notes of The Rox Box/Roxette 86–06.

Studios

- Recorded between April and May 1992 at Tits & Ass Studio (Halmstad, Sweden) and EMI Studios (Stockholm, Sweden)
- Mixed at EMI Studios (Stockholm, Sweden)

Musicians

- Marie Fredriksson – lead and background vocals
- Per Gessle – lead and background vocals, mixing
- Per "Pelle" Alsing – drums
- Vicki Benckert – background vocals
- Anders Herrlin – bass guitar, programming and engineering (EMI Studios)
- Jonas Isacsson – electric guitars
- Clarence Öfwerman – keyboards and production, mixing
- Staffan Öfwerman – percussion and background vocals
- Mats "M.P." Persson – engineering (Tits & Ass Studio)
- Alar Suurna – mixing, engineering (EMI Studios)

== Charts ==
=== Weekly charts ===
Chart (1992)	Peak position
Australia (ARIA)	13
Austria (Ö3 Austria Top 40)	2
Belgium (Ultratop 50 Flanders)	2
Canada Top Singles (RPM)	12
Denmark (IFPI)	2
Europe (Eurochart Hot 100)	3
Europe (European Hit Radio)	3
Finland (Suomen virallinen lista)	2
Germany (GfK)	2
Ireland (IRMA)	15
Netherlands (Dutch Top 40)	2
Netherlands (Single Top 100)	2
New Zealand (Recorded Music NZ)	37
Norway (VG-lista)	1
Sweden (Sverigetopplistan)	2
Switzerland (Schweizer Hitparade)	2
UK Singles (Official Charts)	13
UK Airplay (Music Week)	6
US Billboard Hot 100	58
US Pop Airplay (Billboard)	34
US Cash Box Top 100	53
US Adult Contemporary (Gavin Report)	33
US Top 40 (Gavin Report)	25
US Contemporary Hit Radio (Radio & Records)	33

Chart (2021)	Peak position
Poland Airplay (ZPAV)	79

=== Year-end charts ===
Chart (1992)	Position
Australia (ARIA)	50
Austria (Ö3 Austria Top 40)	19
Belgium (Ultratop)	7
Canada Top Singles (RPM)	88
Europe (Eurochart Hot 100)	6
Europe (European Hit Radio)	6
Germany (Media Control)	11
Netherlands (Dutch Top 40)	15
Netherlands (Single Top 100)	31
Sweden (Topplistan)	9
Switzerland (Schweizer Hitparade)	10

== Certifications ==
Region	Certification	Certified units/sales
Australia (ARIA)	Gold	35,000^{^}
Denmark (IFPI Danmark)	Gold	45,000^{‡}
Sweden (GLF)	Platinum	50,000^{^}
^{^} Shipments figures based on certification alone.^{‡} Sales+streaming figures based on certification alone.

== Release history ==
Region	Date	Format(s)	Label(s)	Ref.
Europe	3 July 1992	7-inch vinyl; CD	EMI	
United Kingdom	20 July 1992	7-inch vinyl; CD; cassette	EMI	
Japan	12 August 1992	Mini-CD	EMI	

== Cascada version ==
"How Do You Do!"

Single by Cascada

from the album Everytime We Touch
- Released: 30 September 2005
- Length: 3:16
- Label: Zooland
- Songwriter: Per Gessle
- Producers: Manuel Reuter; Yann Peifer

Cascada singles chronology
"Everytime We Touch" (2005)	"How Do You Do!" (2005)	"Truly Madly Deeply" (2006)

Audio video
- "How Do You Do!" on YouTube

In 2005, a cover of the song by German dance act Cascada was released as the third single from their debut album, Everytime We Touch (2006). This version charted in the top fifty of the Ö3 Austria Top 40, but failed to chart elsewhere.

=== Formats and track listings ===
- CD maxi
1. "How Do You Do!" (Radio Edit) – 3:16
2. "How Do You Do!" (Pop Airplay Edit) – 2:51
3. "How Do You Do!" (Album Version) – 3:29
4. "How Do You Do!" (Original Club Mix) – 5:05
5. "How Do You Do!" (Rob Mayth Remix) – 5:31
6. "How Do You Do!" (Megara vs. DJ Lee Remix) – 7:05
7. "How Do You Do!" (Tune up! Remix) – 5:30
8. "How Do You Do!" (Veranos Fuzzy Styled Remix) – 6:00
9. "How Do You Do!" (EXR Reconstruction) – 5:57
- Digital download
1. "How Do You Do!" (Radio Edit) – 3:16
2. "How Do You Do!" (Rob Mayth Radio Edit) – 3:55
3. "How Do You Do!" (Original Mix) – 5:04
4. "How Do You Do!" (Megara vs. DJ Lee Remix) – 7:05
