= It Must Have Been Love =

1987 single by Roxette

"It Must Have Been Love (Christmas for the Broken Hearted)"

Single by Roxette
- B-side: "Turn to Me"
- Released: 2 December 1987
- Genre: Soft rock; pop
- Length: 4:48
- Label: EMI
- Songwriter: Per Gessle
- Producer: Clarence Öfwerman

Roxette singles chronology
| "I Want You" (1987) | "It Must Have Been Love (Christmas for the Broken Hearted)" (1987) | "I Call Your Name" (1988) |

Music video
- "It Must Have Been Love" (Official Music Video) on YouTube

"It Must Have Been Love", originally "It Must Have Been Love (Christmas for the Broken Hearted)", is a song written by Per Gessle and performed by the Swedish pop duo Roxette. The power ballad became the duo's third number one hit in the United States, and is one of their best selling releases, being certified gold or platinum in a number of countries. It remains their best-known and signature song.

Five different versions of the song have been officially released. The original song was released in 1987, which was followed by the most successful incarnation, a slightly edited and overdubbed version, omitting the Christmas references, created for the soundtrack to the 1990 film Pretty Woman. During the "Join the Joyride! World Tour" in 1991, the band recorded a country music version in Los Angeles, included on their 1992 album Tourism. A Spanish-language version of the Pretty Woman recording was released on their 1996 compilation Baladas en Español. Finally, an orchestral live performance from the band's 2009 concert at Night of the Proms was included on their 2012 studio album, Travelling.

== Original release (1987) ==
The song was first released as "It Must Have Been Love (Christmas for the Broken Hearted)" in December 1987. It was composed after EMI Germany asked the duo to "come up with an intelligent Christmas single". It became a top five hit in Sweden, but was not released internationally. This version of the song was never included on any Roxette studio album until the 1997 re-release of their debut Pearls of Passion (1986).

=== Music video ===
A performance from a Swedish TV chart show in 1987 acted as the song's first music video. It features Fredriksson and Gessle sitting on a couch on a stage, lip-syncing to the song.

=== Formats and track listings ===
All lyrics written by Per Gessle; all music composed by Gessle, except "Turn to Me" by Marie Fredriksson.

- 7-inch single (Sweden 1362887)
1. "It Must Have Been Love (Christmas for the Broken Hearted)" – 4:48
2. "Turn to Me" – 2:58

=== Charts ===
| Chart (1987) | Peak position |
|---|---|
| Sweden (Sverigetopplistan) | 4 |

== Re-release (1990) ==
"It Must Have Been Love"

Single by Roxette

from the album Pretty Woman: Original Motion Picture Soundtrack
- Released: 19 March 1990
- Genre: Pop
- Length: 4:20
- Label: EMI
- Songwriter: Per Gessle
- Producer: Clarence Öfwerman

Roxette singles chronology
| "Dangerous" (1989) | "It Must Have Been Love" (1990) | "Joyride" (1991) |

Music video
- "It Must Have Been Love" on YouTube

During a run of increasingly successful singles from the duo's 1988 album Look Sharp!, Touchstone Pictures approached Roxette and their label about contributing a song to the soundtrack of the upcoming romantic comedy release Pretty Woman, starring Richard Gere and Julia Roberts. The film was released in March 1990 and went on to make more than US$460 million at the worldwide box office. The corresponding soundtrack album was also a commercial success, which was certified triple-platinum in the US. The soundtrack went on to sell more than nine million copies worldwide.

=== Critical reception ===
Bill Coleman from Billboard magazine described the song as a "rhythmic ballad". Dave Sholin from the Gavin Report wrote: "Per and Marie are on target again. Per Gessle continues to demonstrate his uncanny ability to compose exceptional pop melodies and Marie Fredriksson makes the words and music jump through the speakers. Though timed to coincide with the release of the Julia Roberts/Richard Gere film Pretty Woman, this tune from the soundtrack could easily stand on its own. Interest in the movie only gives it that much more of a boost". Dave Simpson from The Guardian said the song is a "masterpiece of pain". He added that "Fredriksson's genius is in delivering the title line clean and stoic, rather than with tortured vibrato, to show that she's resigned to her fate. But with the jarringly urgent upward key change in the middle eight, the pain floods in again, and she's back to square one".

A reviewer from Liverpool Echo wrote: "It's a ballad, it's big in America, but it's not as heavy-handed as the usual US success. Funnily enough, there even seems to be a bit of an ABBA influence in there". Refinery29 included it at number 39 on their list of The Saddest Breakup Songs of All Time, saying the track "represents the perfect ratio of schlock to sentiment. In someone like Celine Dion's hands, this would have been a complete disaster, but the Swedish duo gaze off to 'where the water flows' and 'where the wind blows' without sounding like '90s Disney characters". Brendon Veevers from Renowned for Sound noted the song as a "timeless power ballad that has aged like a fine wine".

=== Commercial performance ===
A re-written and edited version of the track – the lyric "It's a hard Christmas day" was changed to "It's a hard winter's day" and 24 seconds were removed from the outro – became an international hit during the summer of 1990. It was not the first single released from the Pretty Woman soundtrack, but it became the most successful, spending two weeks at the top spot of the US Billboard Hot 100 in June. The song was certified Gold by the Recording Industry Association of America (RIAA) for sales in excess of 500,000 copies in the US. At the end of the year, Billboard listed it as the second most successful single of 1990, behind Wilson Phillips' "Hold On".

The single peaked at number three in the UK—their highest-peaking single there. It stayed on the UK Singles Chart for 14 weeks, and was certified gold by the British Phonographic Industry (BPI) for sales and streams in excess of 400,000. The song was re-released in the UK and Ireland in September 1993 to tie in with the TV premiere of Pretty Woman, peaking at number ten in both countries. It became Roxette's second of three number one singles in Australia, spending two weeks at the top spot in July 1990. The song was a massive hit in Norway, where it spent twelve weeks at number one. In Switzerland, the song spent three non-consecutive weeks at number one. It also reached number one in Canada, Poland and Spain, and the top five in Austria, Belgium, Ireland, Japan, the Netherlands, New Zealand and West Germany, where it spent nine months in the top 75.

In 2005, Gessle received an award from BMI after the song's four millionth radio play in the US. He received updated awards from the same organization after its five millionth radio play in 2014, and its six millionth play in 2021.

As of May 2026, the song has over 1 billion streams on Spotify.

=== Music video ===
The second video was directed by Doug Freel and was shot in a warehouse. It included clips from Pretty Woman, with Fredriksson singing and playing piano and Gessle playing guitar between various prop changes. There is also an alternate version of the video, without the movie scenes, which was available solely on the VHS The Videos. According to Fredriksson, shooting this video was a surreal experience, as Freel "wanted all movements in slow motion, so I had to lip-sync the vocals at double speed. My first lesson in how to sing an emotional ballad Mickey Mouse style".

As of June 2026, this video has more than 987 million views on YouTube.

=== Formats and track listings ===
All songs were written and composed by Gessle, except "Cry", with music by Fredriksson and Gessle.

- Australian cassette and 7-inch single (US2399)
- EU cassette and 7-inch single (Germany 006-1363807 · UK EM141)
1. "It Must Have Been Love" – 4:20
2. "Paint" – 3:29
- US and Canada cassette (4JM-50283)
1. "It Must Have Been Love" – 4:20
2. "Chances" – 4:07
- European 12-inch single (Germany 060-1363806 · UK EM141)
- Japanese mini-CD single (TODP-2194)
1. "It Must Have Been Love" – 4:20
2. "Paint" – 3:29
3. "Cry" (Live from Himmelstalundshallen, Norrköping on 16 December 1988) – 5:42
- UK CD single (CDEM141)
1. "It Must Have Been Love" – 4:20
2. "Paint" – 3:29
3. "Cry" (Live from Norrköping) – 5:42
4. "Surrender" (Live from Norrköping on 16 December 1988) – 3:07

=== Charts ===
==== Weekly charts ====
| Chart (1990) | Peak position |
|---|---|
| Australia (ARIA) | 1 |
| Austria (Ö3 Austria Top 40) | 3 |
| Belgium (Ultratop 50 Flanders) | 3 |
| Canada Top Singles (RPM) | 1 |
| Canada Adult Contemporary (RPM) | 1 |
| Denmark (IFPI) | 1 |
| Europe (Eurochart Hot 100) | 3 |
| Finland (Suomen virallinen lista) | 7 |
| Ireland (IRMA) | 5 |
| Italy (Musica e dischi) | 11 |
| Luxembourg (Radio Luxembourg) | 2 |
| Netherlands (Dutch Top 40) | 3 |
| Netherlands (Single Top 100) | 2 |
| New Zealand (Recorded Music NZ) | 2 |
| Norway (VG-lista) | 1 |
| Spain (AFYVE) | 1 |
| Sweden (Sverigetopplistan) | 6 |
| Switzerland (Schweizer Hitparade) | 1 |
| UK Singles (Official Charts) | 3 |
| US Billboard Hot 100 | 1 |
| US Adult Contemporary (Billboard) | 2 |
| US Cash Box Top 100 | 2 |
| US CHR/Pop Airplay Chart (Radio & Records) | 1 |
| Zimbabwe (ZIMA) | 1 |
| West Germany (GfK) | 4 |

| Chart (1993) | Peak position |
|---|---|
| Ireland (IRMA) | 10 |
| UK Singles (Official Charts) | 10 |
| UK Airplay (Music Week) | 27 |

| Chart (2012) | Peak position |
|---|---|
| Canada Hot Digital Songs (Billboard) | 67 |

| Chart (2013) | Peak position |
|---|---|
| Slovenia (SloTop50) | 42 |

| Chart (2016) | Peak position |
|---|---|
| France (SNEP) | 117 |

| Chart (2019) | Peak position |
|---|---|
| Australian Digital Tracks (ARIA) | 18 |
| Scottish Singles Sales (Official Charts) | 24 |
| UK Singles Downloads (Official Charts) | 26 |

==== Year-end charts ====
| Chart (1990) | Position |
|---|---|
| Australia (ARIA) | 4 |
| Austria (Ö3 Austria Top 40) | 10 |
| Belgium (Ultratop 50 Flanders) | 14 |
| Canada Top Singles (RPM) | 11 |
| Canada Adult Contemporary (RPM) | 22 |
| Europe (Eurochart Hot 100) | 11 |
| Germany (Media Control) | 15 |
| Netherlands (Dutch Top 40) | 4 |
| Netherlands (Single Top 100) | 17 |
| New Zealand (RIANZ) | 8 |
| Sweden (Topplistan) | 30 |
| Switzerland (Schweizer Hitparade) | 5 |
| UK Singles (OCC) | 14 |
| US Billboard Hot 100 | 2 |
| US Adult Contemporary (Billboard) | 16 |
| US Cash Box Top 100 | 6 |

==== Decade-end charts ====
| Chart (1990–1999) | Rank |
|---|---|
| Austria (Ö3 Austria Top 40) | 89 |

=== Certifications ===
| Region | Certification | Certified units/sales |
|---|---|---|
| Australia (ARIA) | Platinum | 70,000^{^} |
| Austria (IFPI Austria) | Gold | 25,000^{*} |
| Denmark (IFPI Danmark) | Platinum | 90,000^{‡} |
| Germany (BVMI) | Gold | 250,000^{^} |
| Italy (FIMI) | Gold | 35,000^{‡} |
| New Zealand (RMNZ) | 2× Platinum | 60,000^{‡} |
| Sweden (GLF) | Gold | 25,000^{^} |
| United Kingdom (BPI) | Platinum | 600,000^{‡} |
| United States (RIAA) | Gold | 500,000^{^} |
^{*} Sales figures based on certification alone.^{^} Shipments figures based on certification alone.^{‡} Sales+streaming figures based on certification alone.

=== Release history ===
| Region | Date | Format(s) | Label(s) | Ref. |
|---|---|---|---|---|
| United States | 19 March 1990 | 7-inch vinyl; cassette | EMI | |
| Australia | 30 April 1990 | 7-inch vinyl; cassette | EMI | |
| United Kingdom | 21 May 1990 | 7-inch vinyl; 12-inch vinyl; CD; cassette | EMI | |
| Australia | 4 June 1990 | 12-inch vinyl | EMI | |
| Japan | 10 August 1990 | Mini-CD | EMI | |

== "No Sé Si Es Amor" (1997) ==
"No Sé Si Es Amor"

Single by Roxette

from the album Baladas en Español
- B-side: "Directamente a ti"; ("Run to You")
- Released: 28 January 1997
- Songwriters: Per Gessle & Luis Escolar

Roxette singles chronology
| "Un Día Sin Ti" (1996) | "No Sé Si Es Amor" (1997) | "Wish I Could Fly" (1999) |

Roxette released a Spanish-language compilation album, Baladas en Español, in 1996. It consisted of twelve of their down-tempo singles and album tracks, which were translated by Spanish songwriter Luis Gómez-Escolar, who would later co-write the Ricky Martin hit "Livin' la Vida Loca". The album was only released in Spanish and Portuguese-speaking territories. An adapted version of "It Must Have Been Love", titled "No Sé Si Es Amor", was released in early 1997 as the album's second and final single. The song wasn't translated, its lyrics are new, with a slight different meaning from the original lyrics.

=== Formats and track listings ===
Music and original lyrics by Per Gessle. Spanish lyrics by Luis G. Escolar.

- CD single (EU 8652802)
1. "No Sé Si Es Amor" ("It Must Have Been Love") – 4:41
2. "Directamente a Ti" ("Run to You") – 3:30

=== Charts ===
| Chart (1997) | Peak position |
|---|---|
| Spain Top 40 Radio (AFYVE) | 6 |

== 25th anniversary reissue (2015) ==
On the twenty-fifth anniversary of the song's release on the Pretty Woman soundtrack, Parlophone released a limited edition red-coloured vinyl on 19 May 2015. This single included the Pretty Woman version of the song, backed with the original 1987 release and the Los Angeles-studio performance (minus the live intro recorded in Santiago, Chile) from their 1992 album Tourism. The latter features pedal steel guitar performed by Greg Leisz, who is best known for his work with k.d. lang. The single was released via digital download stores on 23 March.

=== Formats and track listings ===
All songs written and composed by Per Gessle.

- 10-inch single (Sweden 0724386504715)
1. "It Must Have Been Love" – 4:18
2. "It Must Have Been Love (Christmas for the Broken Hearted)" – 4:47
3. "It Must Have Been Love" (L.A. Version) – 4:45

== Credits and personnel ==
Credits adapted from the liner notes of the 25th anniversary vinyl re-release.

Original studio version

- Engineered by Per Gessle, Clarence Öfwerman, Anders Herrlin and Alar Suurna
- Mixed by Alar Suurna (1987) and Humberto Gatica (1990)
- Marie Fredriksson – vocals and piano
- Per Gessle – backing vocals
- Per "Pelle" Alsing – drums
- Jonas Isacsson – guitars
- Clarence Öfwerman – keyboards, Synclavier, programming and production

L.A. version

- Recorded at Ocean Way Recording, Los Angeles in March 1992 and EMI Studios, Stockholm in May 1992
- Engineered by Mike Ross and Rail Rogut
- Marie Fredriksson – vocals
- Per Gessle – harmonica
- Per "Pelle" Alsing – drums
- Anders Herrlin – bass guitar
- Jonas Isacsson – electric guitar
- Greg Leisz – pedal steel guitar
- Clarence Öfwerman – keyboards
- Mats "MP" Persson – acoustic guitar
- Alar Suurna – tambourine

== Other notable versions ==
=== Philly Lutaaya version ===
In 1989, the late Ugandan musician Philly Lutaaya, who was then based in Sweden used the song to record his hit "Alone and Frightened" on his album "Alone", in which he came out as an HIV/AIDS patient, becoming the first public figure to be identified with the virus/disease during an HIV/AIDS epidemic in Uganda.

=== Brazilian version ===
The song was recorded twice in Portuguese, by the duo Gilberto e Gilmar as Outro dia nasceu in 1992, and by the forró band Moleca 100 Vergonha ‘’não sou feliz mais‘’ in 2012.

=== Shirley Bassey version ===
Welsh singer Shirley Bassey covered the song in 1995 for the album Shirley Bassey Sings the Movies.

=== Shirley Clamp version ===
In 2006, Swedish pop singer Shirley Clamp recorded a cover version of the song called "När kärleken föds" ("When Love is Born"), it peaked at number 6 at the Swedish singles chart.

=== Megan McKenna version ===
In 2019, English singer Megan McKenna covered "It Must Have Been Love" as the first winner of The X Factor: Celebrity. Following the announcement that she had won, her version of the song was released on 30 November.

==== Track listing ====
Digital download
| No. | Title | Length |
|---|---|---|
| 1. | "It Must Have Been Love" | 2:49 |

==== Charts ====
| Chart (2019) | Peak position |
|---|---|
| Scottish Singles Sales (Official Charts) | 40 |
| UK Singles Downloads (Official Charts) | 40 |

=== Regine Velasquez version ===
On 13 October 2023, Filipino singer-actress Regine Velasquez released a cover of the song for her upcoming studio album Reginified.

== See also ==
- List of European number-one airplay songs of the 1990s
