= Helen Sjöholm discography =

Swedish singer Helen Sjöholm's discography and chart successes

Swedish singer and actress Helen Sjöholm made her first major recording in 1995/1996, when she played the role in Benny Andersson's and Björn Ulvaeus's epic musical Kristina från Duvemåla. Since then, she has contributed to many album recordings. However, only two solo-albums under her own name have been released in 2002 and 2010.

This discography provides a summary of her work from 1995 until today. Albums which feature important contributions by her can be found in the albums section, whereas other collaborations and contributions are listed in the section below.

While not being able to score many hit-singles on the official Swedish Singles Chart, which is based on sales, she nevertheless is responsible for a string of hits on the important Swedish radio chart Svensktoppen. She even holds the record for the longest chart run (278 weeks) and longest consecutive occupation of the number 1 spot (38 weeks, 65 weeks in total) on that chart with the Benny Anderssons Orkester song Du är min man.

== Albums ==
List of albums with Swedish chart positions
Title	Artist	Album details	SWE chart		Contribution of Helen Sjöholm
Title	Artist	Album details	Peak position	Time in (weeks)	Contribution of Helen Sjöholm
Kristina från Duvemåla	Musical	Released: 25 October 1996; Label: Mono Music (MMCD 011); Format: 3×CD	2	74	Leading role as Kristina
Från Waterloo till Duvemåla	Helen Sjöholm, Karin Glenmark Tommy Körberg, Anders Glenmark; Orsa Spelmän	Released: 5 November 1998; Label: Columbia (COL 492935 2); Format: CD	3	26	Vocals on 9/16 tracks; Live album
Visor	Helen Sjöholm	Released: 23 May 2002; Label: Columbia (COL 508086 2); Format: CD	4	45	Solo album
Chess på svenska	Musical	Released: 31 October 2002; Label: Mono Music (MMCD 019); Format: 2×CD	2	12	Leading role as Florence
Genom varje andetag	Helen Sjöholm & Anders Widmark	Released: 24 October 2003; Label: Sonet (980 975-9); Format: CD	11	14	Collaboration with pianist Anders Widmark; Vocals on 10/12 tracks
BAO!	Benny Anderssons Orkester with Helen Sjöholm	Released: 25 June 2004; Label: Mono Music (MMCD 021); Format: CD	1	55	Vocals on 5/14 tracks
BAO på turné	Benny Anderssons Orkester with Helen Sjöholm & Tommy Körberg	Released: 11 May 2006; Label: Mono Music (MMCD 022); Format: CD	6	28	Vocals on 10/22 tracks; Live album
BAO 3	Benny Anderssons Orkester with Helen Sjöholm & Tommy Körberg	Released: 24 October 2007; Label: Mono Music (MMCD 023); Format: CD, digital	3	34	Vocals on 5/12 tracks
Story of a Heart	Benny Andersson Band with Helen Sjöholm & Tommy Körberg	Released: 26 June 2009; Label: Mono Music (MMCD 025); Format: CD, digital	5	11	Vocals on 5/15 tracks
Kristina At Carnegie Hall	Musical	Released: 16 April 2010; Label: Mono Music (MMCD 026); Format: 2×CD, digital	32	2w	Leading role as Kristina; Live album
Euforia	Helen Sjöholm	Released: 17 November 2010; Label: Universal Music (060252753381); Format: CD, digital	6	24	Solo album
O klang och jubeltid	Benny Anderssons Orkester with Helen Sjöholm & Tommy Körberg	Released: 15 June 2011; Label: Mono Music (MMCD 027); Format: CD, digital	1	46	Vocals on 6/13 tracks
Aniara	Kleerup feat Carl Bagge & Helen Sjöholm	Released: 9 May 2012; Label: EMI; Format: CD, digital	47	1	Vocals on 7/18 tracks
Tomten har åkt hem	Benny Anderssons Orkester with Helen Sjöholm & Tommy Körberg	Released: 19 November 2012; Label: Mono Music (MMCD 029); Format: CD, digital	4	9	Vocals on 5/11 tracks
BAO in Box	Benny Anderssons Orkester with Helen Sjöholm & Tommy Körberg	Released: 30 November 2012; Label: Mono Music (MMCD 030 BOX); Format: Box set (6×CD, 2×DVD)	5	13	Vocals on 35/87 tracks
Livet är en schlager	Musical	Released: 28 January 2015; Label: Universal Music (UNI-0602547-02288); Format: CD, digital	-	-	Vocals on 6/15 tracks
Snö & marschalle	Helen Sjöholm & Anna Stadling	Released: 28 October 2022; Label: Universal Music; Format: CD, digital	56	1	

== Other contributions ==
List of other contributions and collaborations
Year	Title	Collaborator(s)	Length	Source/Album	Notes
1997	Som en bro över mörka vatten	Anna Stadling	5:01	Farväl - sånger till tröst	
1998	Vi går och ser på himlens planeter	Anna Stadling	2:23	Julsånger på svenska	Christmas album
1998	Guds frid i gode vise män	Anna Stadling	3:17	Julsånger på svenska	Christmas album
1998	Bethlehems stjärna	Anna Stadling	2:48	Julsånger på svenska	Christmas album
1998	Bewitched	—	5:00	Strike Up The Band	
1998	Wherever He Ain't	—	2:27	Strike Up The Band	
1998	Everything's Coming Up Roses	Marianne Mörck	3:42	Strike Up The Band	
1998	Nygammal vals	Christer Nerfont	2:52	Strike Up The Band	
1999	Tyst lite blygt	Peter Jöback	2:17	Där regnbågen slutar	Soundtrack album
1999	Lys mig en väg	Peter Jöback, Tommy Körberg, Sharon Dyall, Anette Friberg	3:26	Där regnbågen slutar	Soundtrack album
2000	Våra systrar gå i brokiga kläder	—	3:42	Våra systrar gå i brokiga kläder	
2000	Till skuggan av en verklighet	—	3:43	Våra systrar gå i brokiga kläder	
2000	Av tvång	—	3:22	Våra systrar gå i brokiga kläder	
2001	Vår sista dans	Benny Anderssons Orkester	4:49	Benny Anderssons Orkester	First album by Benny Anderssons Orkester; Helen Sjöholm not credited on the cover
2001	Lätt som en sommarfjäril	Benny Anderssons Orkester	3:43	Benny Anderssons Orkester	First album by Benny Anderssons Orkester; Helen Sjöholm not credited on the cover
2001	Du måste finnas	—	6:12	Sånger för livet 3	Live album
2001	Lindansaren	—	6:01	Sånger för livet 3	Live album
2001	En sång om frihet	—	5:19	Sånger för livet 3	Live album
2001	Dona Nobis Pacem	Tommy Körberg, Lena Willemark	6:11	Sånger för livet 3	Live album
2001	Jag lyftar ögat	—	3:00	I goda händer	
2001	The Prayer	Tito Beltran	4:55	Robert Wells: Rhapsody in Rock	Live album
2004	Gabriellas sång	—	3:41	Så som i himmelen	Soundtrack (As It Is In Heaven)
2004	En gång var han mig nära	—	4:21	Unik!	
2004	Come Give Me Love	—	3:17	Fånga en ängel	Tribute album for Ted Gärdestad
2008	Hjärtat vet mer än vi	Patrik Isaksson	3:58	En snäll mans bekännelse	Patrik Isaksson greatest hits album
2008	Höstens vår	Göran Fristorp	4:36	Min lyckas hus	Göran Fristorp album
2010	I den stora sorgens famn	Freddie Wadling	5:50	Scandinavian Strings Attached	
2010	Sometimes	—	3:54	Reconnection	Georg Wadenius album
2010	You're Always Here	Anders Ekborg	4:13	Painted Dreams	Anders Ekborg album
2011	My Friend	Myrra Malmberg	2:53	Another World	Myrra Malmberg album
2011	Klockorna I G.A.	Gibrish	4:45	Klockorna I G.A.	Christmas single
2012	Mia Franzén	Lars Rudolfsson	3:21	Vender tilbage	CowboyBengts album
2012	Grundämnenas Herre	CowboyBengts	3:15	Vender tilbage	CowboyBengts album
2012	Härliga tid som randas	—	5:37	Vender tilbage	CowboyBengts album
2012	Aftonpsalm	Louise Hoffsten, Anna Stadling	4:17	Det kunde lika gärna varit jag	Christmas album
2012	Guldgrävarsång	—	2:50	Det kunde lika gärna varit jag	Christmas album
2012	Önska dig en stilla natt	En salig samling sångerskor	3:20	Det kunde lika gärna varit jag	Christmas album
"—" denotes a solo recording/lead vocal.

== Singles ==
List of singles & songs, with Swedish chart positions
Title	Year	Singles Chart		Svensktoppen			Album
Title	Year	HP	TI	Entry	HP	TI	Album
"Du måste finnas"	1996	6	39w	16 November 1996	5	5w	Kristina från Duvemåla
"Hemma"	1997	60	1w	12 July 1997	2	22w	Kristina från Duvemåla
"Duvemåla hage"	1998	—	—	16 May 1998	7	6w	Kristina från Duvemåla
"Lys mig en väg" (with Peter Jöback, Tommy Körberg, Anette Friberg)	1999	—	—	4 December 1999	13*	—	Där regnbågen slutar
"Vår sista dans" (with BAO)	2001	56	4w	11 August 2001	1	30w	Benny Anderssons Orkester
"Lätt som en sommarfjäril" (with BAO)	2002	—	—	27 April 2001	4	17w	Benny Anderssons Orkester
"Tusen tankar"	2002	—	—	3 August 2002	13*	—	Visor
"Som en eld"	2002	—	—	19 October 2002	14*	—	Visor
"Sakta stiger solen" (with Anders Widmark)	2003	39	2w	19 September 2003	10	1w	Genom varje andetag
"Jag älskar dig" (with Anders Widmark)	2004	—	—	2 May 2004	14*	—	Genom varje andetag
"Du är min man" (with BAO)	2004	—	—	4 July 2004	1	278w	BAO!
"Come Give Me Love"	2004	—	—	5 September 2004	11*	—	Fånga en ängel
"Gabriellas sång"	2004	—	—	17 October 2004	2	68w	Så som i himmelen
"Midnattsdans" (with BAO & Kalle Moraeus)	2004	—	—	—	—	—	BAO!
"Det är vi ändå" (with BAO & Tommy Körberg)	2006	—	—	21 May 2006	1	43w	BAO på turné
"Du frälste mig i sista stund" (with BAO)	2008	—	—	18 May 2008	13*	—	BAO 3
"Nu mår jag mycket bättre" (with BAO & Tommy Körberg)	2008	—	—	24 August 2008	4	14w	BAO 3
"Hjärtat vet mer en vi" (with Patrik Isaksson)	2008	—	—	21 December 2008	5	4w	En snäll mans bekännelse
"Sommaren du fick" (with BAO)	2009	17	3w	2 August 2009	4	4w	Story of a Heart
"I den stora sorgens famn" (with Freddie Wadling)	2010	—	—	7 March 2010	11*	—	Scandinavian Strings Attached
"Kära syster" (with BAO)	2011	—	—	—	—	—	O klang och jubeltid
"En dag i sänder" (with BAO)	2011	—	—	31 July 2011	1	70w	O klang och jubeltid
"Allt syns när man är naken" with BAO, Tommy Körberg & Kalle Moraeus	2011	—	—	—	—	—	O klang och jubeltid
"Vinterhamn" (with BAO)	2012	—	—	23 December 2012	8	1w	Tomten har åkt hem
"Nyårsballongen" (with BAO)	2014	—	—	21 December 2014	12*	—	single only
"När jag faller" (with Peter Jöback)	2014	—	—	15 March 2015	—	—	Livet är en schlager
"Stjärnorna som tindra över Skarpnäck"	2015	—	—	15 March 2015	10	1w	Livet är en schlager
"Jag vill följa med" (with Anders Widmark)	2015	—	—	December 2015	—	—	single only
"—" denotes releases that did not chart
" * " denotes "bubbling under" songs, which were tested for but did not enter the Svensktoppen top10

== See also ==
- Benny Anderssons Orkester
- Benny Andersson discography
- Kristina från Duvemåla
- Chess
