= Benny Andersson discography =

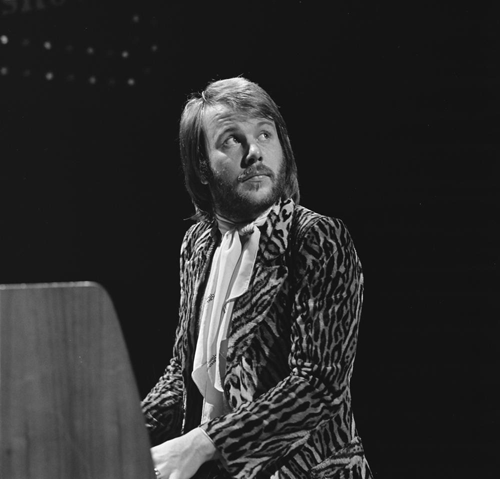
- Studio albums: 11 (excluding contributions), 31 (including contributions)
- Live albums: 1

Benny Andersson has been active as a recording artist since 1964, when he joined Swedish rock band The Hep Stars. With them, and more recently as a member of ABBA and Benny Anderssons Orkester, he became one of the most successful Swedish composers and artists. He also wrote the musicals Chess, Kristina från Duvemåla and Mamma Mia!.

This album-discography provides a comprehensive chronological summary of the work of Benny Andersson. For this reason, every studio-album and live-album which features Andersson as an artist is listed, excluding compilation albums. Besides that, it also includes the main releases from the musicals mentioned above as well as albums, which rely heavily on Andersson as composer and producer.

== 1960s ==
List of albums from the 1960s with selected chart positions
Title	Artist	Year	Album details	SWE Chart		NOR Chart	UK Chart	Contribution of Benny Andersson
Title	Artist	Year	Album details	Peak position	Time in (weeks)	NOR Chart	UK Chart	Contribution of Benny Andersson
We And Our Cadillac	Hep Stars	1965	Released: October 1965; Label: Olga (LPO 01); Format: LP	—	—	9	—	Artist; Composer; Producer
Hep Stars On Stage	Hep Stars	1965	Released: December 1965; Label: Olga (LPO 02); Format: LP	—	—	20	—	Artist; Composer; Producer
The Hep Stars	Hep Stars	1966	Released: December 1966; Label: Olga (LPO 04); Format: LP	12	5w	5	—	Artist; Composer; Producer
Jul med Hep Stars	Hep Stars	1967	Released: December 1967; Label: Olga (LPO 06); Format: LP	—	—	—	—	Artist; Producer
It's Been A Long Long Time	Hep Stars	1968	Released: February 1968; Label: Cupol (CLPNS 342); Format: LP	—	—	—	—	Artist; Composer
Songs We Sang 68	Hep Stars	1968	Released: December 1968; Label: Olga (LPO 07); Format: LP	—	—	—	—	Artist; Composer; Producer

== 1970s ==
List of albums from the 1970s with selected chart positions
Title	Artist	Year	Album details	SWE Chart		NOR Chart	UK Chart	Contribution of Benny Andersson
Title	Artist	Year	Album details	Peak position	Time in (weeks)	NOR Chart	UK Chart	Contribution of Benny Andersson
Lycka	Björn Ulvaeus & Benny Andersson	1970	Released: 1970; Label: Polar (POLS 226); Format: LP	—	—	—	—	Artist; Composer; Producer
Ring Ring	Björn Benny & Agnetha Frida (ABBA)	1973	Released: 26 March 1973; Label: Polar (POLS 242); Format: LP	2	12w	10	—	Artist; Composer; Producer
Waterloo	ABBA	1974	Released: 4 March 1974; Label: Polar (POLS 252); Format: LP	1 (12 weeks)	27w	1	28	Artist; Composer; Producer
ABBA	ABBA	1975	Released: 21 April 1975; Label: Polar (POLS 262); Format: LP	1 (16 weeks)	33w	1	13	Artist; Composer; Producer
Arrival	ABBA	1976	Released: 11 October 1976; Label: Polar (POLS 272); Format: LP	1 (12 weeks)	32w	1	1	Artist; Composer; Producer
The Album	ABBA	1977	Released: 12 December 1977; Label: Polar (POLS 282); Format: LP	1 (4 weeks)	14w	1	1	Artist; Composer; Producer
Voulez-Vous	ABBA	1979	Released: 23 April 1979; Label: Polar (POLS 292); Format: LP	1 (10 weeks)	26w	1	1	Artist; Composer; Producer

== 1980s ==
List of albums from the 1980s with selected chart positions
Title	Artist	Year	Album details	SWE Chart		NOR Chart	UK Chart	Contribution of Benny Andersson
Title	Artist	Year	Album details	Peak position	Time in (weeks)	NOR Chart	UK Chart	Contribution of Benny Andersson
Gracias por la música	ABBA	1980	Released: June 1980; Label: Polar; Format: LP	—	—	—	—	Artist; Composer; Producer
Super Trouper	ABBA	1980	Released: 3 November 1980; Label: Polar (POLS 322); Format: LP	1 (7 weeks)	22w	1	1	Artist; Composer; Producer
The Visitors	ABBA	1981	Released: 30 November 1981; Label: Polar (POLS 342); Format: LP	1 (9 weeks)	14w	1	1	Artist; Composer; Producer
Chess	Musical	1984	Released: November 1984; Label: Polar (POLYXL 2-600); Format: 2xLP	1 (7 weeks)	30w	3	10	Composer; Producer
Gemini	Gemini	1985	Released: November 1985; Label: Polar (POLS 400); Format: LP	9	12w	—	—	Composer; Producer
ABBA Live	ABBA	1986	Released: 18 August 1986; Label: Polar; Format: LP	49	2w	—	—	Artist; Composer; Producer
Geminism	Gemini	1987	Released: April 1987; Label: Polar (POLS 418); Format: LP, CD	13	30w	—	—	Composer; Producer
Klinga mina klockor	Benny Andersson	1987	Released: November 1987; Label: Mono Music (MMCD 001); Format: LP, CD	6	20w	—	—	Artist; Composer; Producer
Chess Original Broadway Cast Recording	Musical	1988	Released: 1988; Label: Polar (POLS 419); Format: LP, CD	—	—	—	—	Composer
Orsa Spelmän	Orsa Spelmän	1988	Released: 1988; Label: Mono Music (MMCD 002); Format: LP, CD	—	—	—	—	Artist; Producer
November 1989	Benny Andersson	1989	Released: November 1989; Label: Mono Music (MMCD 003); Format: LP, CD	13	14w	—	—	Artist; Composer; Producer

== 1990s ==
List of albums from the 1990s with selected chart positions
Title	Artist	Year	Album details	SWE Chart		NOR Chart	UK Chart	Contribution of Benny Andersson
Title	Artist	Year	Album details	Peak position	Time in (weeks)	NOR Chart	UK Chart	Contribution of Benny Andersson
Fiolen Min	Benny Andersson Orsa Spelmän etc.	1990	Released: March 1990; Label: Mono Music (MMCD 005); Format: CD	—	—	—	—	Artist; Producer
Shapes	Josefin Nilsson	1993	Released: March 1993; Label: Mono Music (MMCD 008); Format: CD	14	14w	—	—	Composer; Producer
Chess In Concert	Musical	1994	Released: 1994; Label: Mono Music (MMCD 010); Format: 2xCD	—	—	—	—	Artist; Composer; Producer
Kristina från Duvemåla	Musical	1996	Released: 25 October 1996; Label: Mono Music (MMCD 011); Format: 3xCD	2	74w	—	—	Composer; Producer
Ödra	Orsa Spelmän	1998	Released: 1998; Label: Mono Music (MMCD 013); Format: CD	—	—	—	—	Artist; Producer
Mamma Mia! Original Cast Recording	Musical	1999	Released: 25 October 1999; Label: Polydor; Format: CD	26	8w	—	12	Composer

== 2000s ==
List of albums from the 2000s with selected chart positions
Title	Artist	Year	Album details	SWE Chart		NOR Chart	UK Chart	Contribution of Benny Andersson
Title	Artist	Year	Album details	Peak position	Time in (weeks)	NOR Chart	UK Chart	Contribution of Benny Andersson
Benny Anderssons Orkester	Benny Anderssons Orkester	2001	Released: 28 June 2001; Label: Mono Music (MMCD 017); Format: CD	1 (1 week)	55w	—	—	Artist; Composer; Producer
Chess på svenska	Musical	2002	Released: 31 October 2002; Label: Mono Music (MMCD 019); Format: 2xCD	2	12w	—	—	Composer; Producer
BAO!	Benny Anderssons Orkester	2004	Released: 25 June 2004; Label: Mono Music (MMCD 021); Format: CD	1 (1 week)	55w	—	—	Artist; Composer; Producer
Mamma Mia! på svenska / Swedish Cast Recording	Musical	2005	Released: 9 June 2005; Label: Mono Music; Format: CD	2	36w	—	—	Composer
BAO på turné	Benny Anderssons Orkester	2006	Released: 11 May 2006; Label: Mono Music (MMCD 022); Format: CD	6	28w	—	—	Artist; Composer; Producer
BAO 3	Benny Anderssons Orkester	2007	Released: 24 October 2007; Label: Mono Music (MMCD 023); Format: CD, digital	3	34w	—	—	Artist; Composer; Producer
Mamma Mia! The Movie Soundtrack	Cast of Mamma Mia!	2008	Released: 8 July 2008; Label: Decca Records; Format: CD, digital	1 (9 weeks)	156 w*	1	1	Composer; Producer
Story Of A Heart	Benny Andersson Band	2009	Released: 26 June 2009; Label: Mono Music (MMCD 025); Format: CD, digital	5	11w	10	29	Artist; Composer; Producer

== 2010s ==
List of albums from the 2010s with selected chart positions
Title	Artist	Year	Album details	SWE Chart		AUS Chart	NOR Chart	UK Chart	Contribution of Benny Andersson
Title	Artist	Year	Album details	Peak position	Time in (weeks)	AUS Chart	NOR Chart	UK Chart	Contribution of Benny Andersson
Kristina At Carnegie Hall	Musical	2010	Released: 16 April 2010; Label: Mono Music (MMCD 026); Format: 2xCD, digital	32	2w	—	—	—	Composer; Producer
O klang och jubeltid	Benny Anderssons Orkester	2011	Released: 15 June 2011; Label: Mono Music (MMCD 027); Format: CD, digital	1 (2 weeks)	46 w	—	—	—	Artist; Composer; Producer
Tomten har åkt hem	Benny Anderssons Orkester	2012	Released: 19 November 2012; Label: Mono Music (MMCD 029); Format: CD, digital	4	9 w	—	—	—	Artist; Composer; Producer
Hjälp sökes	Musical	2013	Released: 9 September 2013; Label: Mono Music (MMCD 032); Format: CD, digital	—	—	—	—	—	Artist; Composer; Producer
Kärlekens tid	Gustaf Sjökvists Kammarkör	2015	Released: 18 September 2015; Label: Mono Music (MMCD 033); Format: CD, digital	9	3 w	—	—	—	Artist; Composer; Producer
Mitt hjärta klappar för dig	Benny Anderssons Orkester	2016	Released: 10 June 2016; Label: Mono Music (MMCD 034); Format: CD, Vinyl, digital	2	19 w	—	—	—	Artist; Composer; Producer
Piano	Benny Andersson	2017	Released: 29 September 2017; Label: Deutsche Grammophon; Format: CD, digital, LP	1 (4 weeks)	22 w	18	12	12	Artist; Composer; Producer
Mamma Mia! Here We Go Again: The Movie Soundtrack	Cast of Mamma Mia! Here We Go Again	2018	Released: 13 July 2018; Label: Capitol (US); Polydor (worldwide): Format: CD, digital, vinyl	1 (12 weeks - collections albums chart)	24 w*	1	2	1	Composer; Producer
Dancing Queen	Cher	2018	Released: 28 September 2018; Label: Warner Bros. Records (WBR); Format: CD, Vinyl, digital	2 (albums chart)	2 wks	2	—	2	Composer; Producer

( * denotes that the album is still charting)

== 2020s ==
List of albums from the 2020s with selected chart positions
Title	Artist	Year	Album details	SWE Chart		AUS Chart	NOR Chart	UK Chart	Contribution of Benny Andersson
Title	Artist	Year	Album details	Peak position	Time in (weeks)	AUS Chart	NOR Chart	UK Chart	Contribution of Benny Andersson
Voyage	ABBA	2021	Released: 5 November 2021; Label: Polar; Formats: LP, CD, cassette, digital	-	-	-	-	-	Artist; Composer; Producer

== Singles discography ==
=== Björn and Benny singles ===
Title	Year	Peak chart positions			Sales	Album
Title	Year	SWE	SWE (Svensktoppen)	JAP	Sales	Album
"She's My Kind of Girl" (Note: Recorded without Anni-Frid and Agnetha. Originally released in 1970 in Sweden and France. Later released in Japan in 1972 which became a hit. The song was included in the debut album by Björn & Benny, Agnetha & Frida (renamed ABBA).)	1970	—	—	6	Japan: 188,000+	Ring Ring
"Hej gamle man" (Note: Featuring all ABBA members)	1970	5	1	—		Lycka
"Livet går sin gång" (Note: This song was an album track, but charted in the Toppentipset. (Svensktoppen charts))	1970	—	14	—		Lycka
"Hey, Musikant" (Germany only)	1971	—	—	—		Lycka (2006 reissue)
"Det kan ingen doktor hjälpa"	1971	—	9	—		Lycka (2006 reissue)
"På bröllop" (Note: Featuring all ABBA members. B-Side of "Det kan ingen doktor hjälpa".)	1971	—	9	—		Lycka (2006 reissue)
"Tänk om jorden vore ung"	1971	—	1	—		Lycka (1972 reissue)
"Love has its Ways" (Japan only) (Note: The B-side is an early version of "Rock N Roll Band".)	1972	—	—	—		Lycka (2006 reissue)
"En karusell" (Note: Featuring all ABBA members. Released in Sweden and Japan. The Japanese single (titled "En Carousel" contains an alternative version of Merry-Go-Round (released as the B-side of "People Need Love"). "En Karusell" charted in the Toppentipset (Svensktoppen charts))	1972	—	12	—		Lycka (2006 reissue)
"Att finnas till"	1972	—	6	—		Lycka (2006 reissue)
"—" denotes the single failed to chart or was not released.

== Also appears on ==
- Beginner's Guide to Scandinavia (3CD, Nascente 2011)

== See also ==
- ABBA discography
- Benny Anderssons Orkester
- Hep Stars
- Gemini
