= BAO på turné =

Live album by Benny Anderssons Orkester
- Released: 11 May 2006
- Recorded: Summer 2005 (Örebro, Leksand)
- Genre: Folk
- Length: 78:35
- Label: Mono Music (MMCD 022)
- Producer: Benny Andersson

Benny Anderssons Orkester chronology
| BAO! (2004) | BAO på turné (2006) | BAO 3 (2007) |

Singles from BAO på turné
- 1. "Det är vi ändå" Released: Summer 2006

BAO på turné is the first live album by Benny Anderssons Orkester, released in spring 2006.

== Album information ==
After two studio albums, Benny Anderssons Orkester, current group of former ABBA member Benny Andersson, released its first live album in May 2006. Recording for the album took place during the group's summer tour the previous year in the towns of Örebro and Leksand. As Benny Anderssons Orkester did not tour in 2006, this live album was seen as a kind of compensation for the otherwise missing concert experience.

Ever since the start of the group in 2001, Benny Anderssons Orkester were famous for their mini-tours of Sweden each summer. Though only including about ten dates each year, these tours and the group itself are considered an important part of the Swedish summer. Whereas the two previous studio albums included nothing but new and original compositions by Benny Andersson, their concert set-list offers a much wider range of musical contributions. Normally lasting up to three hours, these concerts also include compositions by other members of Benny Anderssons Orkester, mainly by the members of Orsa Spelmän, traditional Swedish folk music, international classics (like O sole mio or Moon River), classical tunes by the likes of Johann Sebastian Bach (Badinerie) and vene some old ABBA compositions. "BAO på turné", which only includes parts of what a whole concert would normally offer, therefore concentrates more on these unusual numbers, with the famous original BAO tunes being interspersed.

"BAO på turné" includes the biggest hits from Benny Anderssons Orkester and BAO!, the band's two previous studio albums. Amongst them also "Du är min man", which at that time (summer 2006) was still in the middle of its 278-week run on Svensktoppen. Besides that, also two tunes from Benny's first solo album Klinga mina klockor in 1987 are included: the title tune, in the version of the album's opening number "Inledningsvisa", and "Födelsedagsvals till Mona", a birthday-song for Benny's wife Mona Nörklit, written for her 40th birthday in the 1980s.

The album also offers two new compositions, "För dig" and "Det är vi ändå". Both are duets with vocals by Helen Sjöholm and Tommy Körberg. "För dig" ("For You") was later recorded in the studio for the group's next album in 2007, BAO 3, and again in 2009 with English lyrics (this time called "The Stars") for the compilation album Story Of A Heart. "Det är vi ändå", on the other hand, was released on single (in its live version) and eventually became a big hit on the Svensktoppen chart, which it topped for 15 weeks.

Professional ratings
Review scores
| Source | Rating |
|---|---|
| Expressen | link |

== Track listing ==
BAO på turné
| No. | Title | Writer(s) | Vocalist | Length |
|---|---|---|---|---|
| 1. | "Glasgow Boogie" | Benny Andersson | | 4:23 |
| 2. | "Vitalins vals" | Benny Andersson | | 3:15 |
| 3. | "När tvenne hjärtan slå" | Jules Sylvain, Gösta Stevens | Helen Sjöholm, Tommy Körberg | 3:03 |
| 4. | "För dig" | Benny Andersson, Björn Ulvaeus | Helen Sjöholm, Tommy Körberg | 4:02 |
| 5. | "Klinga mina klockor / Inledningsvisa" | Benny Andersson | | 2:24 |
| 6. | "Födelsedagsvals till Mona" | Benny Andersson, Björn Ulvaeus | | 2:35 |
| 7. | "Tobakshandlarvisa" | Nils Perre, Sven Paddock | Helen Sjöholm | 2:30 |
| 8. | "Lätt som en sommarfjäril" | Benny Andersson, Björn Ulvaeus | Helen Sjöholm | 4:15 |
| 9. | "Det är vi ändå" | Benny Andersson, Björn Ulvaeus | Helen Sjöholm, Tommy Körberg | 4:18 |
| 10. | "Aj aj aj vilken röd liten ros" | Jules Sylvain, Gösta Stevens | Helen Sjöholm | 3:21 |
| 11. | "Gamle svarten" | Hamilton Kennedy, Michael Carr, Sven Olof Sandberg | Tommy Körberg | 3:54 |
| 12. | "Slängpolska efter Bysskalle" | trad. | | 2:45 |
| 13. | "Hjortingen" | Hjort Anders Olsson | | 2:55 |
| 14. | "Bälter Svens paradpolkett" | Olle Moraeus | | 2:33 |
| 15. | "Moon River" | Henry Mancini, John Mercer | Tommy Körberg | 3:58 |
| 16. | "Badinerie" | Johann Sebastian Bach | | 2:58 |
| 17. | "O sole mio" | Eduardo di Capua, Giovanni Capurro | Kalle Moraeus | 3:20 |
| 18. | "Jehu" | Benny Andersson | | 3:25 |
| 19. | "Du är min man" | Benny Andersson, Björn Ulvaeus | Helen Sjöholm | 3:42 |
| 20. | "True Love" | Cole Porter | Helen Sjöholm, Tommy Körberg | 3:57 |
| 21. | "Vår sista dans" | Benny Andersson, Björn Ulvaeus | Helen Sjöholm | 4:47 |
| 22. | "Finalpotpurri "Ett glatt humör", "Säg det med ett leende", "Vårat gäng", "Bättre och bättre dag för dag"" | Nils Perre, Sven Arefeldt / Nils Perre, Sven Paddock, Willard Ringstrand / Nils Perre, Sven Paddock / Mark Strong, S.S. Wilson, Karl-Ewert | Helen Sjöholm, Tommy Körberg | 6:04 |
| Total length: | | | | 78:35 |

== Personnel ==
The live version of Benny Anderssons Orkester contains the same musicians as heard on their studio recordings. The only exception being Tommy Körberg, who makes his album debut for Benny Anderssons Orkester on this release (however, he can be heard on both of Benny's solo LPs from the 1980s, Klinga mina klockor and November 1989).

- Benny Andersson: accordion, piano, synclavier
- Göran Arnberg: organ, spinet
- Janne Bengtsson: flute, piccola, crumhorns, barytonsax
- Pär Grebacken: saxophone, clarinet, flute
- Leif Göras: violin, cello, mandolin
- (Nils-Erik) Nicke Göthe: violin, mandolin
- (Jan-Erik) Jogga Ernlund: contrabass
- Calle Jacobsson: tuba, valve trombone
- Tommy Körberg: vocals, guitars
- Leif Lindvall: trumpet
- Kalle Moraeus: violin, zither, guitar, banjo, solomandolin, vocals
- Olle Moraeus: violin, viola, mandolin
- (Pererik) Perra Moraeus: violin, circus-saxophone, mandolin
- Lars Rudolfsson: accordion
- Helen Sjöholm: vocals
- Jörgen Stenberg: drums, percussion

== Chart ==
=== Weekly charts ===
| Chart (2006) | Peak position |
|---|---|
| Swedish Albums (Sverigetopplistan) | 6 |

=== Year-end charts ===
| Chart (2006) | Position |
|---|---|
| Swedish Albums (Sverigetopplistan) | 38 |
