= O klang och jubeltid =

Studio album by Benny Anderssons orkester
- Released: 15 June 2011
- Recorded: 2011 at Riksmixningsverket
- Genre: Folk
- Length: 48:46
- Label: Mono Music (MMCD 027)
- Producer: Benny Andersson

Benny Anderssons orkester chronology
Story Of A Heart (2009)	O klang och jubeltid (2011)	Tomten har åkt hem (2012)

Helen Sjöholm chronology
Euforia (2010)	O klang och jubeltid (2011)

Singles from O klang och jubeltid
- 1. "Kära syster"

O klang och jubeltid is the fourth studio album by Swedish folk-group Benny Anderssons orkester, released in June 2011.

== Album information ==
"O klang och jubeltid" is the first studio album by "Benny Anderssons orkester" since BAO 3 in autumn 2007. Stylistically, it is a typical BAO album, with a variety of musical genres including Swedish folk music, classical and pop influences. The album was recorded in the first half of 2011 in Benny's newly built studio, Rixmixningsverket. The studio is located adjacent to Benny's Mono Music offices and studio, where part of the mixing was done.
As usual, the album features some instrumentals mixed with songs performed by Helen Sjöholm, Tommy Körberg and Kalle Moraeus. This time, eight out of the 13 tracks have vocals, while only five songs are instrumentals. Most of the lyrics are once again written by Benny's former ABBA partner Björn Ulvaeus. All music is composed by Benny Andersson, with the exception of "Månstrålar klara", a traditional tune with lyrics by Arvid Ödmann, performed by Tommy Körberg.

=== Title ===
The title of the album (and its title-track) is taken from and inspired by the student song 'O, gamla klang- och jubeltid!, originally a German song : 'O alte Burschenherrlichkeit, composed by Eugen Höfling in 1825. The song was featured in the (German)stage play Alt-Heidelberg by Wilhelm Meyer-Förster, part 5, scene 5, which was translated to Swedish as Gamla Heidelberg by Frans Hedberg in 1903, where the song starts 'O, du studentens glada liv, varthän har du försvunnit? (O, that merry life of the student days, where did you go?). The song was reworked by August Lindh, and published for the first time in Swedish in 'Sångbok för Västmanlands-Dala nation nr 9, 1921'.

The Student Song 'O, gamla klang- och jubeltid is still often sung in academical gatherings, and while doing so, the students underline the lyrics by standing onto their chairs.

== Track listing ==
All music is composed by Benny Andersson.

O klang och jubeltid
No.	Title	Lyrics	Music	Vocalist	Length
1.	"O klang och jubeltid"	Björn Ulvaeus	Benny Andersson	Helen Sjöholm, Tommy Körberg, Kalle Moraeus	3:54
2.	"Kära syster"	Björn Ulvaeus	Benny Andersson	Helen Sjöholm	4:10
3.	"Månstrålar klara"	Arvid Ödmann	trad.	Tommy Körberg	3:09
4.	"Midsommarpolka"		Benny Andersson		3:25
5.	"Allt syns när man är naken"	Björn Ulvaeus	Benny Andersson	Helen Sjöholm, Tommy Körberg, Kalle Moraeus	4:16
6.	"Alla goda ting"		Benny Andersson		2:29
7.	"En dag i sänder"	Björn Ulvaeus	Benny Andersson	Helen Sjöholm	3:45
8.	"Flickornas rum"		Benny Andersson		2:28
9.	"De ljuva drömmarnas orkester"	Björn Ulvaeus	Benny Andersson	Helen Sjöholm, Tommy Körberg, Kalle Moraeus	4:05
10.	"Jag hör..."	Björn Ulvaeus	Benny Andersson	Tommy Körberg	3:29
11.	"Sorgmarsch"		Benny Andersson		4:53
12.	"Vilar glad. I din famn"	Kristina Lugn	Benny Andersson	Helen Sjöholm	4:24
13.	"Brudmarsch"		Benny Andersson		4:19
Total length:					48:46

== Songs ==
- The title track, "O klang och jubeltid" (Oh sound and time of jubilation), with lyrics by Björn Ulvaeus, is a reflection of happy times gone by. Helen Sjöholm, Tommy Körberg and Kalle Moraeus individually sing the verses and rejoin for the chorus, accompanied by Adolf Fredrik's Youth Choir for the last chorus. Together they look back on happy times in the past, calling them a "good old friend", longing for them and wanting to see them again.
- As a preview, the Helen Sjöholm number "Kära syster" (Dear sister) was released to radio in the middle of May, some five weeks before the album's release. It received its premiere on "Nanne i P4", the radio show of Nanne Grönwall, Benny's daughter-in-law, on Friday 13 May 2011. The song carries a similar theme to Jolene by Dolly Parton, with a woman begging another woman not to steal her man/husband.
- "Månstrålar klara", performed by Tommy Körberg, is a unique exception, as it was not written by Benny Andersson. Taking into account all studio albums that feature Benny as an artist, this is the first since 1973 (when Agnetha Fältskog wrote one song for the ABBA album Ring Ring) that doesn't consist entirely of his own material. "Månstrålar klara" is a traditional composition, with lyrics by Arvid Ödmann. The song was previously often performed by Swedish tenor Jussi Björling.
- "Midsommarpolka" is the first instrumental track on the album, a polka, as the title implicates. It is very much in the style of previous Benny Anderssons orkester instrumentals and polkas.
- "Allt syns när man är naken", again with lyrics by Björn Ulvaeus, translates to Everything is visible when you're naked. Helen Sjöholm sings lead and is accompanied by Tommy Körberg and Kalle Moraeus in the choruses. While the verses sound like a soft ballad, the choruses have a completely different style and a stomping drum-beat. The line "du är Yin, jag är Yang", which means I am Yin, you are Yang, is repeated throughout the song. A video clip of the recording process of this song was uploaded onto the Mono Music homepage and can be found here: Video clip, Mono Music
- "Alla goda ting" is another instrumental in typical BAO style.
- "En dag i sänder", with lyrics by Björn Ulvaeus and vocals by Helen Sjöholm, is the most "modern" sounding pop track on the album. It has a driving beat, with drums and electric guitar, and a catchy melody. It is the most ABBA-like sounding song on this album. According to Jans Peterson of Aftonbladet, it could and should be a new single. In the end of July, while the band was on tour in Sweden, "En dag i sänder" was tested for Svensktoppen and immediately entered the hitlist at number 4 on 31 July before eventually topping the chart the week after.
- "Flickornas rum" (The girl's room) is a charming classical tune. The beginning, which exclusively features Benny Andersson on piano, sounds very much like a classical piano sonata. With the inclusion of violins in the second half, the musical format transforms to a violin sonata, which almost always features piano and violin(s) together.
- After a minute-lasting instrumental introduction, "De ljuva drömmarnas orkester" (The sweet dreams orchestra) becomes a march, performed by Helen Sjöholm, Tommy Körberg and Kalle Moraeus as a trio. The lyrics by Björn Ulvaeus are a depiction of the joyous experience of a band, most obviously Benny Anderssons orkester itself, playing in front of an audience. According to Aftonbladet, it could very well a new theme song for the band.
- "Jag hör..." (I hear...) is a classical ballad by Tommy Körberg, sounding as if it could be an outtake from one of Benny Anderssons musicals, such as Chess, in which Körberg also played one of the leading roles. The lyrics, once again written by Björn Ulvaeus, describe voices calling out of the dark and the black, telling the listener to "come" and that "here is a place for you". It is open to interpretation, but could indicate voices from the twilight land, as Aftonbladet's review suggests.
- "Sorgmarsch" is an instrumental, lasting for nearly five minutes. It can be translated as march of sorrow or funeral march. The sound corresponds to the title.
- Another song performed by Helen Sjöholm, "Vilar glad. I din famn", was premiered at the royal wedding of Swedish Crown Princess Victoria in June 2010. For this occasion, it was performed by Gustaf Sjökvists kammarkör, Royal Stockholm Philharmonic Orchestra and Orsa Spelmän in Stockholm's Storkyrkan. The choral version was released as a single in summer 2010, with an a cappella version also being included (MMCD-S 136).
- "Brudmarsch", the bride's march, is the album's closing number. It starts out with a rather bare instrumentatal, which develops as the song progresses. Finally, Adolf Fredrik's Youth Choir can be heard again, singing the line "Vilar glad i din famn" from the previous song. As already mentioned, the original version of "Vilar glad. I din famn" was premiered at the wedding of Swedish Crown Princess Victoria and was therefore originally played for a bride. Because of this, the inclusion of this line in the end of "Brudmarsch" makes perfect sense. The Swedish instrument nyckelharpa can also be heard on this song, played by Cajsa Ekstav and Cecilia Österholm. Benny Andersson himself got one of these instruments in December 2009 and eventually also learned to play it.

== Promotion and reception ==
Professional ratings
Review scores
Source	Rating
Aftonbladet	link
Allehanda	link
Dagens Nyheter	link
Gefle Dagbladet	link
Smålandposten	link
Svenska Dagbladet	link

To promote the album, Benny Anderssons orkester went for a summer tour, playing at eight cities in Sweden at the end of July 2011. Additionally, the group also performed on the first date of this year's Allsång på Skansen TV program, which was aired on Tuesday 28 June. Three songs were performed: "Kära syster" and "O klang och jubeltid" during the actual program and "Allt syns när man är naken" during the extra 30min web broadcast, which followed the TV coverage.

Upon its release, the album received positive and some mixed reviews. Although the biggest Swedish newspaper Aftonbladet gave the album a score of four stars, other reviewers and newspapers, like Dagens Nyheter, found the album a be bit too sweet sounding, or just too old-fashioned and nothing new. Still, most reviewers regard the album as being the soundtrack of the Swedish summer.

"O klang och jubeltid" entered the Swedish albums chart, Sverigetopplistan, at number 3 in the week after its release. Most likely due to increased promotion during their ongoing summer tour, "O klang och jubeltid" managed to top the Swedish albums chart in its 6th week, after five weeks in the top 10. It is the third album by BAO to hit the number 1 spot, after Benny Anderssons orkester in 2001 and BAO! in 2004.
The album was certified with a Gold disc on 16 August, in its 9th week on the Swedish albums chart.

=== Summer tour 2011 ===
Starting on Thursday 21 July, Benny Anderssons orkester went on tour across Sweden. The band performed at eight dates:

- Thursday 21 July: Örnsköldsvik
- Friday 22 July: Järvsö
- Saturday 23 July: Leksand
- Sunday 24 July: Karlstad
- Wednesday 27 July: Helsingborg
- Thursday 28 July: Gothenburg
- Friday 29 July: Mariefred
- Saturday 30 July: Stockholm

As usual, a concert by Benny Anderssons orkester is expected to last up to four hours, with approximately 50 songs being played. Apart from new material and past recordings by the band, the set also includes standards as well as some ABBA tracks like "I Do, I Do, I Do, I Do, I Do", "Hasta Mañana" and, for the first time in a BAO set, "Kisses Of Fire", a disco-pop number from 1979's Voulez-Vous album.

The tour premiere in Örnsköldsvik received rave reviews from the press. Swedish newspaper Aftonbladet described it as a "joy-explosion" and the best concert of the band so far. It added that "this is how summer sounds" and gave the concert a maximum of.

== Personnel ==
The following musicians contributed to the recording of "O klang och jubeltid":

- Benny Andersson: accordion, piano, synclavier
- Göran Arnberg: keyboards
- Janne Bengtsson: flute, piccola, baryton saxophone
- Pär Grebacken: saxophone (alt & tenor), clarinet, flute
- Leif Göras: violin, mandolin, cello
- (Nils-Erik) Nicke Göthe: violin, mandolin
- (Jan-Erik) Jogga Ernlund: doublebass, electric bass
- Calle Jacobsson: tuba, trombone, contrabass trumpet
- Tommy Körberg: vocals
- Leif Lindvall: trumpet, cornet, flügelhorn
- Kalle Moraeus: vocals, violin, acoustic guitar, electric guitar, banjo, mandolin
- Olle Moraeus: violin, viola, mandolin
- (Pererik) Perra Moraeus: violin, alto-saxophone, mandolin
- Lars Rudolfsson: accordion
- Helen Sjöholm: vocals
- Jörgen Stenberg: drums, percussion

Additional contributions:

- Adolf Fredrik's Youth Choir directed by Karin Bäckström: choir on "O klang och jubeltid" and "Brudmarsch"
- Cajsa Ekstand: nyckelharpa on "Brudmarsch"
- Cecilia Österholm: nyckelharpa on "Brudmarsch"
