= BAO 3 =

Studio album by Benny Anderssons Orkester
- Released: 24 October 2007
- Recorded: 2007
- Genre: Folk
- Length: 44:47
- Label: Mono Music, (MMCD 023)
- Producer: Benny Andersson

Benny Anderssons Orkester chronology
BAO på turné (2006)	BAO 3 (2007)	Story Of A Heart (2009)

Singles from BAO 3
- 1. "Fait Accomplit"; 2. "Du frälste mig i sista stund"

BAO 3 is a studio album by Swedish folk group Benny Anderssons Orkester, released on 24 October 2007. It is the group's third studio album and their fourth release in total.

== Album information ==
BAO 3 (the title indicates that it's the third BAO album) includes many different musical styles, ranging from Swedish folk music to pop, jazz, classical tunes, and Viennese influences. The album is officially credited to "Benny Anderssons Orkester, Helen Sjöholm & Tommy Körberg", indicating that it also includes several tracks with vocals. In fact, compared to its studio predecessor, BAO! in 2004, the number of vocals tracks has increased. Seven out of the 12 tracks on the album are sung by either Helen Sjöholm or Tommy Körberg or as a duet. Körberg can be heard on a BAO studio album for the first time, after already appearing together with the group during their tours and also lending vocals to two tracks on Benny Andersson's two solo albums from the 1980s, Klinga mina klockor and November 1989.

As usual, most of the lyrics were written by Andersson's former ABBA partner Björn Ulvaeus, while all the music was composed by Andersson himself.

BAO 3 was recorded in Sveriges Radios Studio 5 and Atlantis Studio, both in Stockholm, during 2007. Like all Benny Anderssons Orkester albums, it was engineered by Bernard Löhr und subsequently mixed by him and Andersson at Mono Music Studio.

=== Success and promotion ===
Professional ratings
Review scores
Source	Rating
Aftonbladet	link

BAO 3 did not achieve the same success as the group's other two studio albums, which both topped the Swedish Albums Chart and stayed on the chart for 55 weeks. Nevertheless, BAO 3 entered the charts on November 1, reached the top 3 and also managed to collect a Gold disc during its 34-week chart run.

BAO 3 is the first and to date also last album by the group to be released in autumn, namely October. All their other albums were released in late spring and early summer, in May, June or July. And because Benny Anderssons Orkester is also famous for its summer tours, the band and its music is strongly connected with that time of the year. So the album's inability to sell as well as Benny Anderssons Orkester and BAO! could be linked to this rather unusual release date.

Due to Helen Sjöholm giving birth to her first child, Benny Anderssons Orkester did not tour in 2007. Instead, they performed two concerts in Stockholm and Gothenburg to promote the album. Contrary to their summer tours, the venues were not the usual small open-air stages, but rather big concert halls, like the Ericsson Globe in Stockholm, where they played in front of 6,000 people.

=== Songs and trivia ===
Two big Svensktoppen hits were released from BAO 3. "Fait Accompli", with lyrics by Björn Ulvaeus and vocals by Tommy Körberg, entered the radio chart on December 1 and eventually topped the list for 11 weeks in early 2008. In the summer of the same year, the Helen Sjöholm and Tommy Körberg duet "Nu mår jag mycket bättre" became a top 5 hit on Svensktoppen. The lyrics for this song were written by Swedish poet and dramatist Kristina Lugn. By this time, Benny Anderssons Orkester's hit "Du är min man" was still going strong on Svensktoppen, albeit already being four years old, and eventually outliving both tracks by far.

- The album also includes a song with English lyrics, "Crush On You". This up-tempo pop number, performed in BAO style, is another Sjöholm and Körberg duet. It is said that the song, or at least parts of it, was written back in 1979 during recording sessions for ABBA's Voulez-Vous album. However, a demo version from those sessions with vocals by Agnetha Fältskog or Anni-Frid Lyngstad does not exist.
- "För dig" originally appeared on Benny Anderssons Orkester's live album BAO på turné in 2006. In 2009, an English-language version, titled "The Stars", was recorded for the group's compilation album Story Of A Heart.
- "Upp till dig", performed by Helen Sjöholm, borrows some elements from a song called "(I Am) The Seeker", another old composition which dates back to the ABBA days. It was ultimately performed as part of the Abbacadabra musical in 1983 and subsequently released on a single by B. A. Robertson.
- The track "Bonde söker fru", with lyrics by Björn Ulvaeus and vocals by Tommy Körberg, is a funny depiction of and parody about the famous Swedish reality TV program Bonde söker fru (farmer seeks wife). It is performed as a Charleston.
- "Helens brudvals" was written for Helen Sjöholm's wedding in 2006.
- Key parts of "Godnattvisa" was reused for the outro of "Little Things" by ABBA, released on their 2021 album Voyage.

== Track listing ==
All music is composed by Benny Andersson

BAO 3
No.	Title	Lyrics	Music	Vocalist	Length
1.	"Marsch pannkaka"		Benny Andersson		3:39
2.	"För dig"	Björn Ulvaeus	Benny Andersson	Helen Sjöholm, Tommy Körberg	3:49
3.	"Du frälste mig i sista stund"	Björn Ulvaeus	Benny Andersson	Helen Sjöholm	3:57
4.	"Fait accompli"	Björn Ulvaeus	Benny Andersson	Tommy Körberg	4:00
5.	"Crush On You"	Björn Ulvaeus	Benny Andersson	Helen Sjöholm, Tommy Körberg	3:38
6.	"Calle J:s vals"		Benny Andersson		2:53
7.	"Helens brudvals"		Benny Andersson		3:13
8.	"Upp till dig"	Björn Ulvaeus	Benny Andersson	Helen Sjöholm	4:03
9.	"Bonde söker fru"	Björn Ulvaeus	Benny Andersson	Tommy Körberg	3:04
10.	"Nu mår jag mycket bättre"	Kristina Lugn	Benny Andersson	Helen Sjöholm, Tommy Körberg	5:00
11.	"Wienerbrot"		Benny Andersson		3:37
12.	"Godnattvisa"		Benny Andersson		3:48
Total length:					44:47

== Personnel ==
The following musicians appear on BAO 3:

- Benny Andersson: accordion, piano, synclavier, ukulele
- Göran Arnberg: keyboards
- Janne Bengtsson: flute, piccola, barytonflute
- Pär Grebacken: saxophone, clarinet, flute
- Leif Göras: violin, mandolin, solo-violin on "Helens brudvals"
- (Nils-Erik) Nicke Göthe: violin, mandolin
- (Jan-Erik) Jogga Ernlund: contrabass, bass
- Calle Jacobsson: tuba, trombone, bass trumpet
- Tommy Körberg: vocals
- Leif Lindvall: trumpet, flügelhorn, cornet
- Kalle Moraeus: violin, acoustic guitar, electric guitar, banjo, mandolin, bouzouki
- Olle Moraeus: violin, viola, mandolin, solo-violin on "Godnattvisa"
- (Pererik) Perra Moraeus: violin, circus-saxophone, mandolin
- Lars Rudolfsson: accordion
- Helen Sjöholm: vocals
- Jörgen Stenberg: drums, percussion

== Charts ==
=== Weekly charts ===
Chart (2007–2008)	Peak position
Swedish Albums (Sverigetopplistan)	3

=== Year-end charts ===
Chart (2007)	Position
Swedish Albums (Sverigetopplistan)	53
Chart (2008)	Position
Swedish Albums (Sverigetopplistan)	94
