= Det är vi ändå =

Single by BAO

from the album BAO på turné
- Released: 2006
- Recorded: Örebro and Leksand, Sweden, 2005
- Genre: folk
- Label: Mono
- Songwriters: Benny Andersson; Björn Ulvaeus

"Det är vi ändå" is a song written by Benny Andersson and Björn Ulvaeus, and originally performed by BAO with Helen Sjöholm & Tommy Körberg on the 2006 album BAO på turné 2006 and released as a single the same year On 28 May 2006, the song entered Svensktoppen, reaching first position on 25 June 2006. The song stayed at Svensktoppen for totally 43 weeks, ending the visit on 19 March 2007. before leaving chart.

In 2009, the song was recorded by Elisabeth Andreassen as a vocal duet with Sven Nordin for her folk music album Spellemann. On 14 July 2009, Elisabeth Andreassen performed the song live as a vocal duet with Alexander Rybak at Allsång på Skansen.
