= Euforia – Helen Sjöholm sjunger Billy Joel =

Studio album by Helen Sjöholm
- Released: 17 November 2010
- Recorded: 2010
- Genre: Pop
- Length: 42:12
- Label: Universal
- Producer: Gunnar Nordén

Helen Sjöholm chronology
Kristina at Carnegie Hall (2010)	Euforia – Helen Sjöholm sjunger Billy Joel (2010)	O klang och jubeltid (2011)

Euforia – Helen Sjöholm sjunger Billy Joel (transl. Helen Sjöholm sings Billy Joel) is an album by Swedish singer and actor Helen Sjöholm, released in November 2010. The album features 11 compositions by American musician and pianist, singer-songwriter, and classical composer Billy Joel, performed by Sjöholm. All songs are performed in Swedish, with lyrics written by Tomas Andersson Wij.

== Album Information ==
"Euforia" is the 2nd solo album by Swedish singer and musical star Helen Sjöholm. Sjöholm is famous for playing the role of Kristina in Benny Andersson's and Björn Ulvaeus's (both of ABBA fame) musical Kristina från Duvemåla and being part of Andersson's current group Benny Anderssons Orkester. Apart from various other contributions through the years (see Helen Sjöholm discography), she also released a solo album Visor in 2002. It took her almost ten years to record another album of her own, which was eventually called "Euforia" and released in late 2010.

Recording and mixing for the album, which was produced by Gunnar Nordén, took place in Atlantis Studios and Supro Studio, Stockholm, throughout 2010.

"Euforia" is a concept album. All songs are compositions by Billy Joel, to which Tomas Andersson Wij wrote Swedish lyrics. Apparently, Sjöholm came across the Billy Joel song She's Always A Woman sometime in early 2010, while thinking about a new album. Being a favourite of hers, she started listening to more Billy Joel songs and discovered one song after another that she liked. Eventually, in the spring of 2010, she developed the album project together with Martin Östergren, Georg "Jojje" Wadenius, producer Gunnar Nordén and Tomas Andersson Wij, who was asked to write the Swedish lyrics for all titles.

Upon its release in November 2010, the album immediately entered the Swedish Albums Chart and peaked at number six on 3 December. During its 18-week chart run, the album also received a Gold disc in the end of December. To promote the album, the song "Kvinnan för dig" (originally titled She's Always A Woman) was released to radio and a promo clip for television was produced by Universal Music Sweden. In early 2011, Sjöholm went on tour and played 16 dates in Sweden.

== Track listing ==
Euforia – Helen Sjöholm sjunger Billy Joel
No.	Title	Lyrics	Music	Original Title	Length
1.	"Euforia"	Tomas Andersson Wij	Billy Joel	Summer, Highland Falls	3:12
2.	"Ärlighet"	Tomas Andersson Wij	Billy Joel	Honesty	3:40
3.	"Låt det va"	Tomas Andersson Wij	Billy Joel	Don't Ask Me Why	2:52
4.	"Flodens botten"	Tomas Andersson Wij	Billy Joel	The River of Dreams	5:20
5.	"Barpianisten"	Tomas Andersson Wij	Billy Joel	Piano Man	5:12
6.	"Varje sår säker ett sår"	Tomas Andersson Wij	Billy Joel	And So It Goes	3:07
7.	"Kvinnan för dig"	Tomas Andersson Wij	Billy Joel	She's Always a Woman	3:23
8.	"New York"	Tomas Andersson Wij	Billy Joel	New York State of Mind	4:49
9.	"Ljudet av ett regn"	Tomas Andersson Wij	Billy Joel	Falling of the Rain	3:46
10.	"Leila"	Tomas Andersson Wij	Billy Joel	All for Leyna	3:31
11.	"Sångerna"	Tomas Andersson Wij	Billy Joel	Lullabye (Goodnight, My Angel)	3:15
Total length:					42:12

== Personnel ==
List of musicians that contributed to the recordings of Euforia:

- Vocals: Helen Sjöholm
- Electric guitar: Georg Wadenius
- Piano, Organ: Martin Östergren
- Acoustic Guitar: Gunnar Nordén
- Drums: André Ferrari
- bass: Fredrik Jonsson
- Tenor saxophone, Alto flute: Magnus Lindgren
- Strings: Stockholm Sessions Strings

== Cover Versions ==
On 19 December 2020 Swedish singer Tove Styrke covered Varje sår säker ett sår during the last episode of the 11th season of the TV4 show Så mycket bättre. Despite not changing the lyrics, Tove's version featured progressive electronics and wind instruments. By the end of the performance Helen called this version 'beautiful' and 'strong'.
