= Fait accompli (BAO song) =

Song by BAO

from the album BAO 3
- Language: Swedish
- Released: 24 October 2007
- Genre: Swedish folk music
- Label: Mono
- Composer(s): Benny Andersson
- Lyricist(s): Björn Ulvaeus

Fait accompli is a song written by Benny Andersson and Björn Ulvaeus. With Tommy Körberg as vocalist, it was recorded by BAO on the 2007 album BAO 3. It was also recorded in English, with the same title, on the 2009 album Story of a Heart.

The song became a major Svensktoppen success, charting for 19 weeks between 2 December 2007-13 April 2008 before leaving chart.
