= Tomten har åkt hem =

Studio album by BAO
- Released: 19 November 2012
- Genre: Christmas
- Length: 37 minutes
- Label: Mono
- Producer: Benny Andersson

BAO chronology
O klang och jubeltid (2011)	Tomten har åkt hem (2012)	BAO in Box (2012)

Tomten har åkt hem is a Christmas album by BAO, released on 19 November 2012.

== Track listing ==
Tomten har åkt hem
No.	Title	Lyrics	Music	Vocalist	Length
1.	"Marsch militaire"		Franz Schubert, Arr.		3:37
2.	"Tomten har åkt hem"	Björn Ulvaeus	Benny Andersson	Helen Sjöholm, Tommy Körberg	3:20
3.	"Julvals"				3:24
4.	"Tomtestomp"				3:28
5.	"Knalle Juls vals"	Evert Taube		Tommy Körberg, Helen Sjöholm	3:31
6.	"Tomtarnas vaktparad"		Kurt Noack, Arr.		4:35
7.	"Vinterhamn"	Björn Ulvaeus	Benny Andersson	Helen Sjöholm	3:49
8.	"Mössens julafton (när nätterna blir långa)"	Alf Prøysen, Swedish-language lyrics by Ulf Peder Olrog	Alf Prøysen, Arr.	Helen Sjöholm, Tommy Körberg, Kalle Moraeus	2:46
9.	"Trettondagspolkan"				3:09
10.	"Christmas medley"				3:39
11.	"Nu tändas tusen juleljus"	Emmy Köhler	Emmy Köhler, arr. Benny Andersson	Helen Sjöholm	2:28

== Charts ==
=== Weekly charts ===
Chart (2012–2013)	Peak position
Swedish Albums (Sverigetopplistan)	4

=== Year-end charts ===
Chart (2012)	Position
Swedish Albums (Sverigetopplistan)	28
