= BAO! =

Studio album by Benny Anderssons orkester
- Released: 25 June 2004
- Recorded: 2004
- Genre: Folk
- Length: 47:06
- Label: Mono Music (MMCD 021)
- Producer: Benny Andersson

Benny Anderssons orkester chronology
Benny Anderssons orkester (2001)	BAO! (2004)	BAO på turné (2006)

Singles from BAO!
- 1. "Du är min man" Released: Summer 2004; 2. "Midnattsdans"

BAO! is the second studio album by Benny Anderssons orkester, released in June 2004 on Benny's own Mono Music label. Recording for the album took place in the first half of 2004 at Polar Studios and Sveriges Radio Studio 4, Stockholm.

== Album Information ==
Similar to its predecessor Benny Anderssons orkester in 2001, the sound on "BAO!" is a mixture of different styles and influences. Classical influences and traditional Swedish folk music can be heard, just as well as pop and jazz influences. Credited to "Benny Anderssons orkester med (with) Helen Sjöholm", the album features five tracks with vocals by Helen Sjöholm, amongst others. All the music is composed by Benny Andersson, while the lyrics are provided by old ABBA colleague Björn Ulvaeus, Peter Dalle and Ylva Eggehorn.

After being released in early summer of 2004, "BAO!" immediately entered the top 5 of the Swedish Albums Chart, staying there the whole summer and eventually topping it on September 17. By the end of September, the album received a Platinum award. By coincidence, "BAO!" dropped out of the charts after 55 weeks, which is exactly the same number of weeks its predecessor Benny Anderssons orkester stayed on the same chart three years before.

"BAO!" includes Benny Anderssons orkester's biggest hit to date, Du är min man. The song, performed by Helen Sjöholm and featuring vocals by Björn Ulvaeus, has broken several Svensktoppen records. Du är min man entered the chart in early July 2004 and stayed there for a breathtaking 278 weeks, until December 2009. Moreover, it topped the charts on several occasions and in total stayed on top of Svensktoppen for 65 weeks. No other song, either before or after, has even come close to these records.
Two English versions have been recorded of Du är min man, both being titled You Are My Man, which also is the literal translation of the Swedish title. The only differences between those two versions are the lyrics, which are varying at same places, but in total have the same concept. The first version of You Are My Man was recorded for promotional use, when Benny Anderssons orkester went to Minnesota to do some concerts in 2005. The second and official version was recorded in 2009 for the compilation album Story Of A Heart, which also includes three other tracks from "BAO!": "Glasgow Boogie", "Bed Of Roses" ("En dans på rosor") and "Jehu" (all of which being instrumentals).

Besides performing three solo numbers on "BAO!", Helen Sjöholm can also be heard on two duets. The first one is called "Midnattsdans" and is performed together with Kalle Moraeus, member of Benny Anderssons orkester and folk-group Orsa Spelmän. The song was also released on single, but due to the ongoing popularity of Du är min man, which was still topping the charts by then, it fail to chart and was not even tested for Svensktoppen. Since 2004, the song gets performed on all tours of Benny Anderssons orkester in a funny and humorous way.
The album's closing number, "Kärlekens tid", is performed by Helen together with the Duvemålakören (a vocal choir), directed by Bosse Eriksson.

== Track listing ==
All music is composed by Benny Andersson

BAO!
No.	Title	Lyrics	Music	Vocalist	Length
1.	"Glasgow Boogie"		Benny Andersson		3:32
2.	"En dans på rosor"		Benny Andersson		3:04
3.	"Du är min man"	Björn Ulvaeus	Benny Andersson	Helen Sjöholm	3:35
4.	"Vitalins vals"		Benny Andersson		3:01
5.	"På en solskenspromenad"		Benny Andersson		3:47
6.	"Jehu"		Benny Andersson		3:44
7.	"Midnattsdans"	Björn Ulvaeus	Benny Andersson	Helen Sjöholm, Kalle Moraeus	3:39
8.	"Riks1:an"		Benny Andersson		2:35
9.	"Julvals"		Benny Andersson		3:24
10.	"Skenbart"	Peter Dalle	Benny Andersson	Helen Sjöholm	4:19
11.	"Trettondagspolkan"		Benny Andersson		3:07
12.	"Stora skuggan"		Benny Andersson		3:11
13.	"Saknadens rum"	Ylva Eggehorn	Benny Andersson	Helen Sjöholm	3:35
14.	"Kärlekens tid"	Ylva Eggehorn	Benny Andersson	Helen Sjöholm, Duvemålakören	2:27
Total length:					47:06

== Personnel ==
The following musicians contributed to BAO!:

- Benny Andersson: accordion, piano, synclavier
- Göran Arnberg: organ, spinet
- Janne Bengtsson: flute, piccola, crumhorns, barytonsax
- Pär Grebacken: saxophone, clarinet, flute
- Leif Göras: violin, cello, mandolin
- (Nils-Erik) Nicke Göthe: violin, mandolin
- (Jan-Erik) Jogga Ernlund: contrabass
- Calle Jacobsson: tuba, valve trombone
- Leif Lindvall: trumpet
- Kalle Moraeus: violin, zither, guitar, banjo, solomandolin, vocals on "Midnattsdans"
- Olle Moraeus: violin, viola, mandolin
- (Pererik) Perra Moraeus: violin, circus-saxophone, mandolin
- Lars Rudolfsson: accordion
- Helen Sjöholm: vocals
- Jörgen Stenberg: drums, percussion
- Duvemålakören under direction of Bosse Eriksson: vocals on "Kärlekens tid"

== Charts ==
=== Weekly charts ===
Chart (2004)	Peak position
Swedish Albums (Sverigetopplistan)	1

=== Year-end charts ===
Chart (2004)	Position
Swedish Albums (Sverigetopplistan)	5

== Certifications ==
Region	Certification	Certified units/sales
Sweden (GLF)	Platinum	60,000^{^}
^{^} Shipments figures based on certification alone.

== See also ==
- Benny Andersson
- ABBA
