= Fait accompli (disambiguation) =

Fait accompli is a French phrase commonly used to describe an action that is completed before those affected by it are in a position to query or reverse it.

Fait accompli or Fait Accompli may also refer to:

== Music ==
- Fait Accompli (album), a 2014 album by Canibus
- "Faît Accompli" (Curve song), 1992
- "Fait accompli" (BAO song), 2007
- Fait Accompli, a 2003 album by Spencer P. Jones
- "Fait Accompli", a 1989 promotional single by Yukihiro Takahashi

== Other uses ==
- Fait Accompli, a racehorse, the winner of the 1972 Perth Cup
- Fait accompli, a 2007 book by Nick Piombino
- Fait Accompli, a 1998 film by Andrzej Sekuła
- "Fait Accompli", an episode of the TV series Alias
