= Story of a Heart (album) =

Compilation album by Benny Andersson Band
- Released: 26 June 2009
- Recorded: 1987–2009
- Genre: Folk, pop
- Length: 53:11
- Label: Mono
- Producer: Benny Andersson

Benny Andersson Band chronology
| BAO 3 (2007) | Story of a Heart (2009) | O klang och jubeltid (2011) |

Singles from Story of a Heart
- 1. "Sommaren du fick" 2. ""Story of a Heart""

Story of a Heart is a compilation album by Swedish group Benny Andersson Band, released in July 2009.

== Album Information ==
Benny Anderssons Orkester is the current band of former ABBA member Benny Andersson. As "Story of a Heart" was the group's first album to be released outside of Sweden, the band is referred to as "Benny Andersson Band".

Professional ratings
Review scores
| Source | Rating |
|---|---|
| Allmusic | link |
| Entertainment Weekly | B link |
| The Independent | link |

=== International release ===
English lyrics were written by Björn Ulvaeus (also of ABBA fame) for four of the most successful songs of the band's back catalogue. In addition, a new song was recorded and sung by Helen Sjöholm, who was and is responsible for the female vocals of Benny Anderssons Orkester. The new song, "Story of a Heart", also became the title track of the album and was subsequently released on single. A Swedish version, "Sommaren du fick", was included on the Swedish version of the album and was also released on single in this country.

The album also includes nine instrumental tunes, all of which being old recordings from the band's previous albums as well as Benny's 1987 solo album Klinga mina klockor. To fit into the album concept, also the titles of those tracks were (directly) translated into the English language.

"Story of a Heart" was released in the UK on July 9, 2009. Five days earlier, on July 4, Benny Anderssons Orkester played a huge concert on London's Hampstead Heath. The concert was intended as a trigger for the band's promotion of their first UK album, and received good reviews in the press.

Eventually, the song received a lot of airplay and the album managed to enter the UK Albums Chart and peaked at No. 29.

=== Swedish release ===
In Sweden, where versions of most of the tracks from "Story of a Heart" had already been released, the album was promoted as a greatest hits collection. Upon its release in the end of June 2009, the album entered the Swedish Albums Chart the next week at its peak position, No. 5.

At the same time, the English single release climbed to number 17 on the Swedish Singles Chart, while its Swedish version "Sommaren du fick" reached number 4 on the Svensktoppen radio chart.

As almost every year, Benny Anderssons Orkester also played some concerts in Sweden as part of their summer-tour.

== Track listing ==
The international version of the track listing omits the last track, "Sommaren du fick", thus reducing the total length of the remaining 14 tracks to 48:07.

Story of a Heart (Swedish version)
| No. | Title | Lyrics | Music | Original Album (Year) | Length |
|---|---|---|---|---|---|
| 1. | "Glasgow Boogie" | | Benny Andersson | BAO! (2004) | 3:54 |
| 2. | "Trolska" | | Benny Andersson | Klinga mina klockor (1987) as "Trolskan" | 2:06 |
| 3. | "Story of a Heart" (feat. Helen Sjöholm) | Björn Ulvaeus | Benny Andersson | new recording | 5:07 |
| 4. | "Bed of Roses" | | Benny Andersson | BAO! (2004) as "En dans på rosor" | 3:04 |
| 5. | "You Are My Man" (feat. Helen Sjöholm) | Björn Ulvaeus | Benny Andersson | BAO! (2004) as "Du är min man" | 3:36 |
| 6. | "Cirkus finemang" | | Benny Andersson | Benny Anderssons Orkester (2001) | 4:18 |
| 7. | "Fait Accompli" (feat. Tommy Körberg) | Björn Ulvaeus | Benny Andersson | BAO 3 (2007) | 3:56 |
| 8. | "Song from the Second Floor" | | Benny Andersson | Benny Anderssons Orkester (2001) as "Sång från andra våningen" | 3:46 |
| 9. | "Birthday Waltz for Mona" | | Benny Andersson, Björn Ulvaeus | Klinga mina klockor (1987) as "Födelsedagsvals till Mona" | 2:22 |
| 10. | "(If This Is) Our Last Dance" (feat. Helen Sjöholm) | Björn Ulvaeus | Benny Andersson | Benny Anderssons Orkester (2001) as "Vår sista dans" | 4:45 |
| 11. | "Jehu" | | Benny Andersson | BAO! (2001) | 3:44 |
| 12. | "Tyrolean Schottische" | | Benny Andersson | Benny Anderssons Orkester (2001) as "Schottis i tyrolen" | 2:51 |
| 13. | "The Stars" (feat. Helen Sjöholm & Tommy Körberg) | Björn Ulvaeus | Benny Andersson | BAO 3 (2007) as "För dig" | 3:47 |
| 14. | "P.S." | | Benny Andersson | Benny Anderssons Orkester (2001) | 1:03 |
| 15. | "Sommaren du fick" (feat. Helen Sjöholm) | Björn Ulvaeus | Benny Andersson | new recording, Swedish version of "Story Of A Heart" | 5:03 |
| Total length: | | | | | 53:11 |

== Personnel ==
The songs on the album are performed by the following members of the "Benny Andersson Band":

- Benny Andersson: accordion, piano, synclavier
- Göran Arnberg: keyboards
- Janne Bengtsson: flute, piccola, baryton saxophone, crumhorn
- Pär Grebacken: saxophone, clarinet
- Leif Göras: violin, mandolin
- (Nils-Erik) Nicke Göthe: violin, mandolin
- (Jan-Erik) Jogga Ernlund: doublebass, electric bass
- Calle Jacobsson: tuba, trombone, contrabass trumpet
- Tommy Körberg: vocals
- Leif Lindvall: trumpet, cornet
- Kalle Moraeus: violin, acoustic guitar, electric guitar, banjo, mandolin, bouzouki
- Olle Moraeus: violin, viola, mandolin
- (Pererik) Perra Moraeus: violin, alto-saxophone, mandolin, clarinet
- Lars Rudolfsson: accordion
- Helen Sjöholm: vocals
- Jörgen Stenberg: drums, percussion

== Charts ==
=== Weekly charts ===
| Chart (2009) | Peak position |
|---|---|
| Norwegian Albums (VG-lista) | 10 |
| Swedish Albums (Sverigetopplistan) | 5 |

=== Year-end charts ===
| Chart (2009) | Position |
|---|---|
| Swedish Albums (Sverigetopplistan) | 99 |
