= Tomas Andersson Wij =

Swedish musician

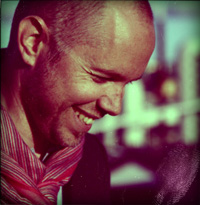

Background information
- Also known as: TAW
- Born: Tomas Per Andersson; 6 February 1972 (age 53); Stockholm, Sweden
- Genres: Pop
- Occupations: Singer; songwriter; journalist
- Years active: 1998–present
- Website: tomasanderssonwij.com

Tomas Andersson Wij (born 6 February 1972, birthname: Tomas Per Andersson), often abbreviated as TAW, is a Swedish singer, songwriter, and journalist.

== Early life ==
He was born on 6 February 1972 in Stockholm, Sweden and raised in the south suburbs Fruängen and Sköndal.

== Journalist and editor ==
Between years 1990 and 1997, Tomas Andersson Wij was a writer in Svenska Dagbladet, as well as Swedish music magazine Pop and Swedish entertainment publication Nöjesguiden. In the mid 1990s, he was editor of the television show Knesset on ZTV. He also worked as a DJ for Sveriges Radio in the summer of 2000.

He has edited two anthologies, Solidaritet (Cordia 1998) and Boken om Recovery (Libris, 2002). He is cofounder and coeditor alongside Sven-Gösta Holst for the existentialist journal Von Oben, which published two issues in 2002 and 2003.

== Music ==
Producer Lars Halapi discovered Tomas Andersson Wij through a simple demo tape in 1995 and went on to produce Tomas Andersson Wij's first two albums. After the breakthrough album Ett slag för dig he toured regularly, usually as a solo act with his guitar. He was nominated for the Swedish Grammies for four times. TAW was also known as a great literature and poetry writer.

TAW attracted much more attention with in 2000 with his Swedish lyrics of Billy Joel songs, in the Helen Sjöholm album Euforia - Helen Sjöholm sjunger Billy Joel. In 2007 he took part in Melodifestivalen interpreting Carola's winning song Evighet also known as "Invincible" at the final in Globen.

The same year he received the Café Magazine's category for "best dressed artist".

He has also written songs or translated lyrics for other artists and translations into other Swedish artists such as Freddie Wadling, Totta Näslund and Bo Kaspers Orkester.

In 2013, he was awarded the Evert Taube Scholarship.

== Discography ==
=== Albums ===
- 1998: Ebeneser
- 2000: Ett slag för dig
- 2002: Vi är värda så mycket mer
- 2004: Stjärnorna i oss
- 2005: Live på Rival
- 2005: Tomas Andersson Wij
- 2007: En introduktion till Tomas Andersson Wij
- 2008: En sommar på speed
- 2010: Spår
- 2012: Romantiken
- 2014: Mörkrets hastighet
- 2018: Avsändare okänd
- 2019: Splitter, Vol. 1
- 2020: Högre än händerna når
- 2022: Åskan i hjärtat

=== Singles and EPs ===
- 1997: "Varelser i vattnet"
- 1998: "Tusen sätt att försvinna"
- 1998: "Väljer dig"
- 2000: Landet vi föddes i EP
- 2000: "Du skulle tagit det helt fel"
- 2000: "Gör nånting vackert"
- 2000: "Hej då"
- 2001: "Ett slag för dig"
- 2002: "Jag börjar minnas mig"
- 2002: "Slå"
- 2002: "Vissa dagar"
- 2003: "Blues från Sverige"
- 2004: "Tommy och hans mamma"
- 2004: "Sången om dig och mig"
- 2005: "Oroshjärta"
- 2006: En hel värld inom mig (EP)
- 2007: "1980"
- 2007: "Hälsingland"
- 2007: "Evighet"
- 2007: "Mellanstora mellansvenska städer"
- 2008: "Jag har simmat långt ut från land"
- 2008: "Sena tåg"
- 2008: "När ditt tåg kommer"
- 2009: "Det ligger i luften"
- 2010: "Allt är bättre än ingenting"
- 2011: "Jag är på väg till dig"
- 2012: "Sturm Und Drang"
- 2012: "Romantiken" (EP)
- 2013: "Här kommer alla känslorna (på en och samma gång)"
- 2016: "Vi får dö en annan dag"
- 2017: "Jag nådde aldrig riktigt fram till dig"
- 2018: "Just idag känns du nära (Saras sång)
- 2019: "Stockholmssommar"
- 2020: "Jag var ett konstigt barn"
- 2020: "Dit du går"
- 2020: "Högdalen Centrum"
- 2020: "Sträck ut dina armar"
- 2020: "Sträck ut dina armar (akustisk)
- 2021: "Diamanter"
