= Adolf Fredrik Church =

Church in Stockholm, Sweden

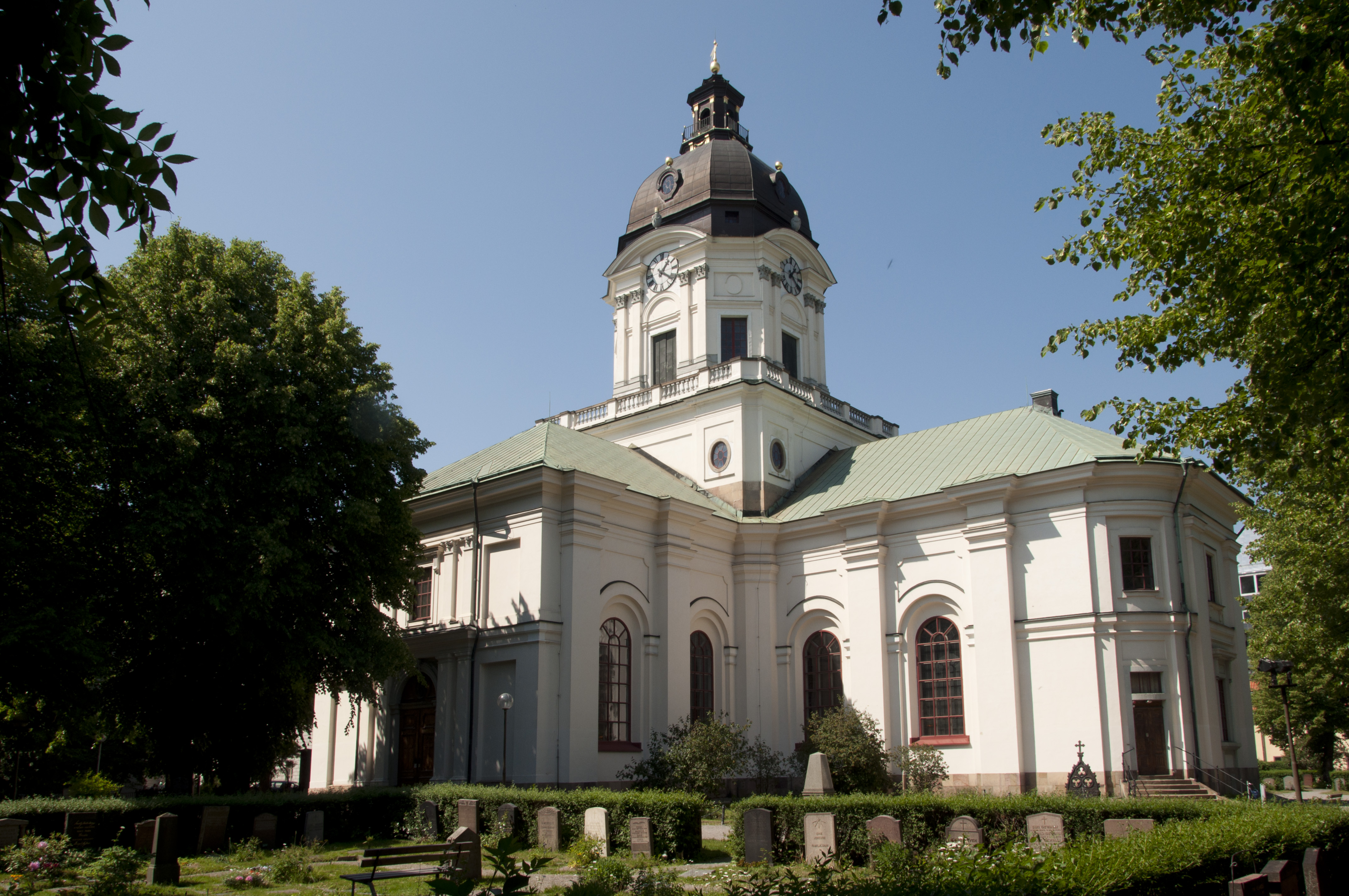
- Adolf Fredrik Church

Religion
- Affiliation: Church of Sweden
- Rite: Protestant
- Ecclesiastical or organizational status: Parish church
- Year consecrated: 27 November 1774

Location
- Location: Stockholm, Sweden
- Interactive map of Adolf Fredrik Church
- Coordinates: 59°20′16″N 18°03′37″E

Architecture
- Groundbreaking: 1768

Website
- www.adolffredrik.se

Adolf Fredrik Church (Swedish: Adolf Fredriks kyrka) is a church in central Stockholm, Sweden, named after Adolf Frederick. It was built in 1768–1774, replacing a wooden chapel from 1674, which was dedicated to Saint Olof. It was inaugurated on 27 November 1774.

Its cemetery is where René Descartes was first buried in 1650, before his remains were moved to France. Inside the church a memorial to the memory of Descartes was installed by Gustav III. Other famous people buried in the church cemetery include Swedish Prime Minister Olof Palme, who was assassinated only a block from the church, Prime Minister Hjalmar Branting, physicist Carl Benedicks, and the composer Anders Eliasson.

The church is currently headed by pastor Ted Harris.

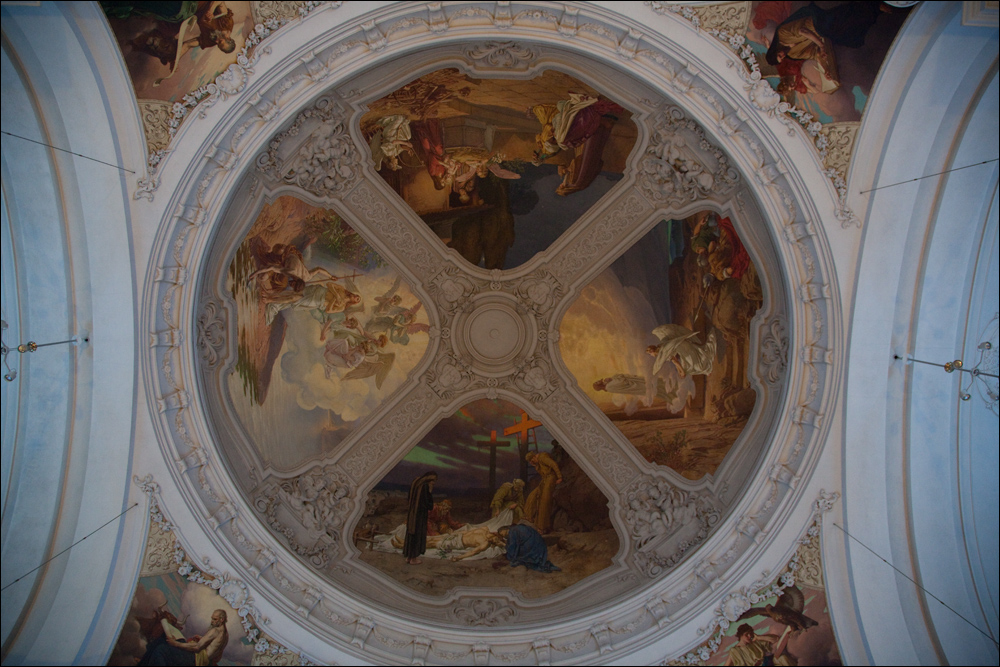
Jesus's life portrayed on a ceiling painting by Julius Kronberg

== See also ==
- Adolf Fredrik's Youth Choir
