= You Have to Be There =

1995 musical theatre song

"Du måste finnas"

Song by Helen Sjöholm
- Language: Swedish
- English title: "You Have to Be There"
- Released: 1995
- Songwriter(s): Benny Andersson, Björn Ulvaeus

"You Have to Be There" (Swedish: Du måste finnas) is a song from the 1995 musical Kristina från Duvemåla, written by Benny Andersson and Björn Ulvaeus, originally performed by Helen Sjöholm. The lyrics are sung by the lead character Kristina, where she doubts her faith in God after her miscarriage.

The song was popular outside of its performance as part of the musical, reaching the top 10 of the Swedish-language Svensktoppen during December 1996, following its release. In later years, notable televised performances in Sweden have included a cover by Newkid, sung on the 11th season of Så mycket bättre, which charted at number one in Sweden in December 2020. Internationally, the song was performed by Susan Boyle on America's Got Talent in 2011 and included in her album Someone to Watch Over Me later the same year.
