= True Talent =

Swedish television music competition

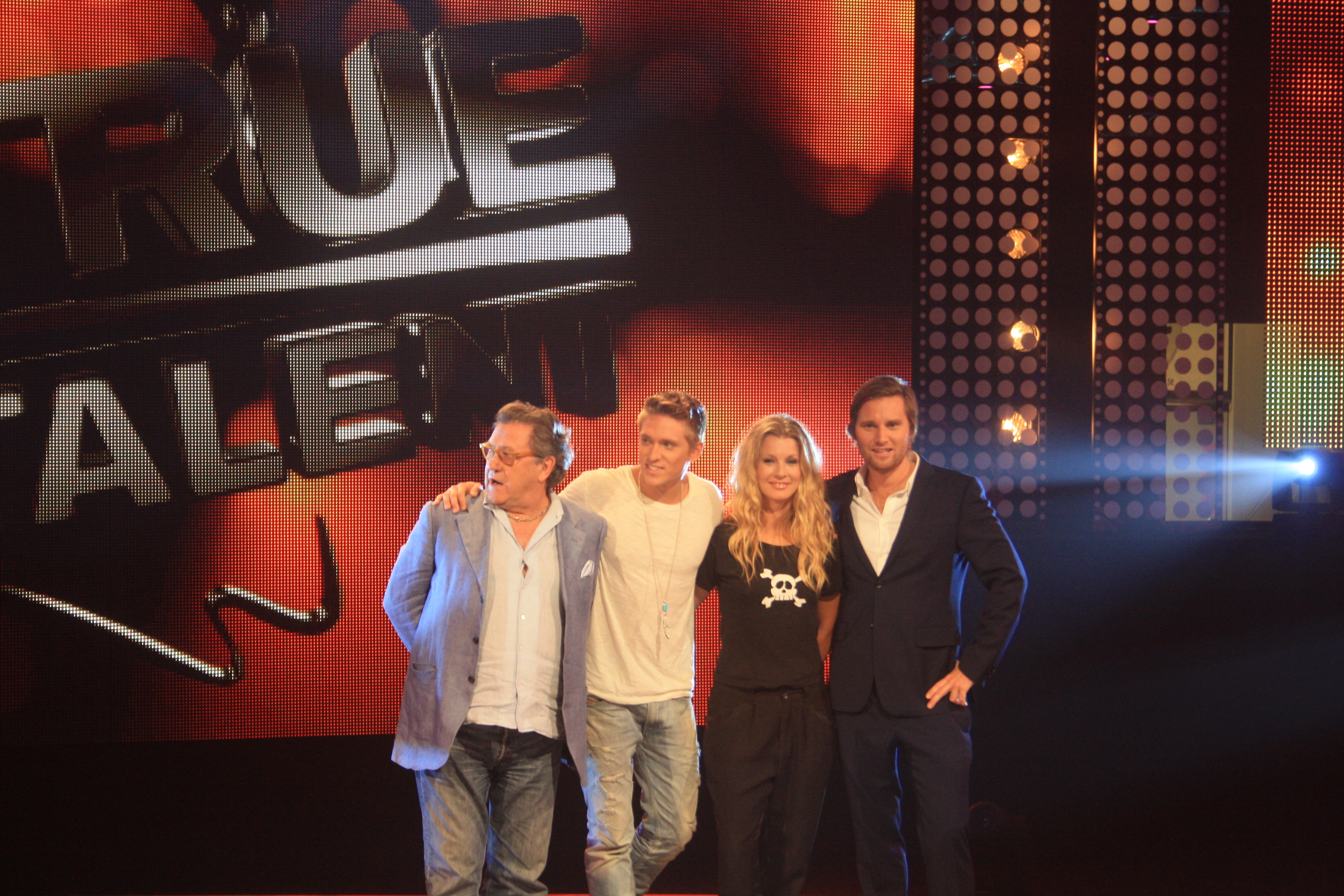
True Talent judges and host for season one

True Talent was a singing talent show that was broadcast on TV3 in Sweden. The first and only season of the show premiered on August 23, 2011 and ended on November 27, 2011. Judges were Danny Saucedo, Pernilla Andersson and Tommy Körberg. The host for season one was Ola Selmén. The season's winner was Dimitri Keiski. After the first season, TV3 put the show on indefinite hiatus.

== Rules of the competition ==
The idea of the show was to pick the singer with the best voice and technique, regardless of appearance, gender, personal style or age. The audience sat with their backs to the contender while voting. The audience was the jury - the biggest jury group in the world - and consisted of people from three generations. A majority of the jury members of each generation had to vote for the contestant in order for him/her to move up in the competition.
