= Klinga mina klockor (song) =

Song by Benny Andersson

from the album Klinga mina klockor
- Released: 1987
- Genre: folk
- Composer: Benny Andersson
- Lyricist: Björn Ulvaeus

Klinga mina klockor is a song with music by Benny Andersson and lyrics by Björn Ulvaeus. It appeared on the 1987 album "Klinga mina klockor".

The song stayed at Svensktoppen for five weeks between 7 February-6 March 1988, peaking at 5th position.

In 2009, the song was recorded by Elisabeth Andreassen on the album Spellemann.
