= November 1989 (album) =

Studio album by Benny Andersson
- Released: 1989
- Genres: Instrumental, folk
- Label: Mono
- Producer: Benny Andersson

Benny Andersson chronology
Klinga mina klockor (1987)	November 1989 (1989)	Benny Anderssons orkester (2001)

November 1989 is an album by Benny Andersson that released in 1989. This album of Swedish folk music was a hit in Scandinavia. The first track, "Skallgång", was used to open the 2022 virtual concert residency ABBA Voyage. Word meaning search party (lit. ~echo walk).

== Track listing ==
1. "Skallgång"
2. "Machopolska"
3. "Vals efter Efraim Andersson"
4. "Sekelskiftesidyll"
5. "Dans på vindbryggan"
6. "Stjuls"
7. "Tröstevisa"
8. "Målarskolan"
9. "Novell #1"
10. "The Conducator" (Benny Andersson & Björn Ulvaeus)
11. "Stockholm by night"

== See also ==
- Benny Andersson
- ABBA
