= Spellemann (album) =

Studio album by Elisabeth Andreassen
- Released: 9 February 2009 (Norway); 20 April 2009 (Sweden)
- Genre: Folk music
- Label: Grappa Musikkforlag AS
- Producer: Bjørn Ole Rasch

Elisabeth Andreassen chronology
Short Stories (2005)	Spellemann (2009)	Julenatt (with Rein Alexander) (2009)

Spellemann is a folk music album by Norwegian singer Elisabeth Andreassen. It was released in Norway on 9 February 2009. On the album charts, it peaked at #6 in Norway and #45 in Sweden.

== Track listing ==
1. "Klinga mina klockor"
2. "Här är gudagott att vara"
3. "Blinde-Karls vise"
4. "Sommerfuglen" (duet with Nora Andreassen)
5. "Gabriellas sång"
6. "Det är vi ändå" (duet with Sven Nordin)
7. "De nære ting"
8. "Koppången"
9. "Du som har mitt hela hjärta"
10. "Bryllupsvals"
11. "För kärlekens skull"
12. "Nu mår jag mycket bättre" (duett med Bjarte Hjelmeland)

== Charts ==
Chart (2009)	Peak position
Norway	7
Sweden	5
