= You Are My Man =

"Du är min man"

Single by Benny Anderssons orkester & Helen Sjöholm

from the album BAO!
- Released: 2004
- Genre: Dansband music Folk
- Songwriters: Benny Andersson; Björn Ulvaeus

"You Are My Man" is a song performed by Benny Anderssons orkester and Helen Sjöholm on the 2009 album Story of a Heart. The song is an English version of the Swedish song "Du är min man", also performed by Benny Anderssons Orkester and Helen Sjöholm but on the 2004 album BAO!. The music was composed by Benny Andersson and both the Swedish and the English versions are written by Björn Ulvaeus.

In 2005 the song won Guldklaven for Song of the Year ("Årets låt").

== Svensktoppen ==
"Du är min man" entered the Swedish Svensktoppen on 11 July 2004 and stayed in the top 10 until it failed to chart on 8 November 2009, totaling 278 weeks on the chart. The song topped the chart for the 38 first weeks and was on top for a total of 60 weeks during its entire run.

When the song left the chart the host of Svensktoppen, Carolina Norén, was interviewed by Erik Blix on the radio show P4 Extra and remarked that "Du är min man" was the song that more than any other stirred feelings with the listeners. That the song divided the audience into two distinct, angry groups with opposite opinions about the song. That when the song left the chart they received sad e-mails as well as pictures of listeners drinking champagne and celebrating. Norén said that new rules might have contributed to the song finally failing to chart.

== Loreen version ==
"Du är min man"

Promotional single by Loreen
- Released: 12 December 2020
- Length: 3:08
- Label: Universal Music
- Songwriters: Benny Andersson; Björn Ulvaeus
- Producers: David Krueger; Niklas Carson Mattsson

Swedish pop music singer-songwriter Loreen released a cover version of the song as a promotional single on 12 December 2020.

=== Background ===
Loreen performed the song on Så mycket bättre. Talking about performing the song in front of Helen Sjöholm, she said, "Sometimes you are lucky enough to meet people for the first time, even though it feels like you have hung out your whole life. I had that experience with Helen Sjöholm. You have to look for such a warm, loving and talented woman. We laughed together, talked deep life questions and everything felt so natural. It was a great honor to sing 'You are my man' in front of you."

=== Personnel ===
Credits adapted from Tidal.

- David Krueger – Producer
- Niklas Carson Mattson – Producer
- Benny Andersson – Composer
- Loreen – Associated Performer, vocals
- Björn Ulvaeus – Author

== Other versions ==
- Kalle Moraeus and Annika Jankell (previous host for Svensktoppen) performed the song on TV show Doobidoo on 20 October 2006.
- In Dansbandskampen 2008 the song was performed by Larz-Kristerz, but with the lyrics "Jag är din man" ("I Am Your Man").
- In Körslaget 2009 the song was performed by Stefan Nykvists choir from Älvdalen.
