= Ylva Eggehorn =

Swedish poet, writer, and hymnwriter

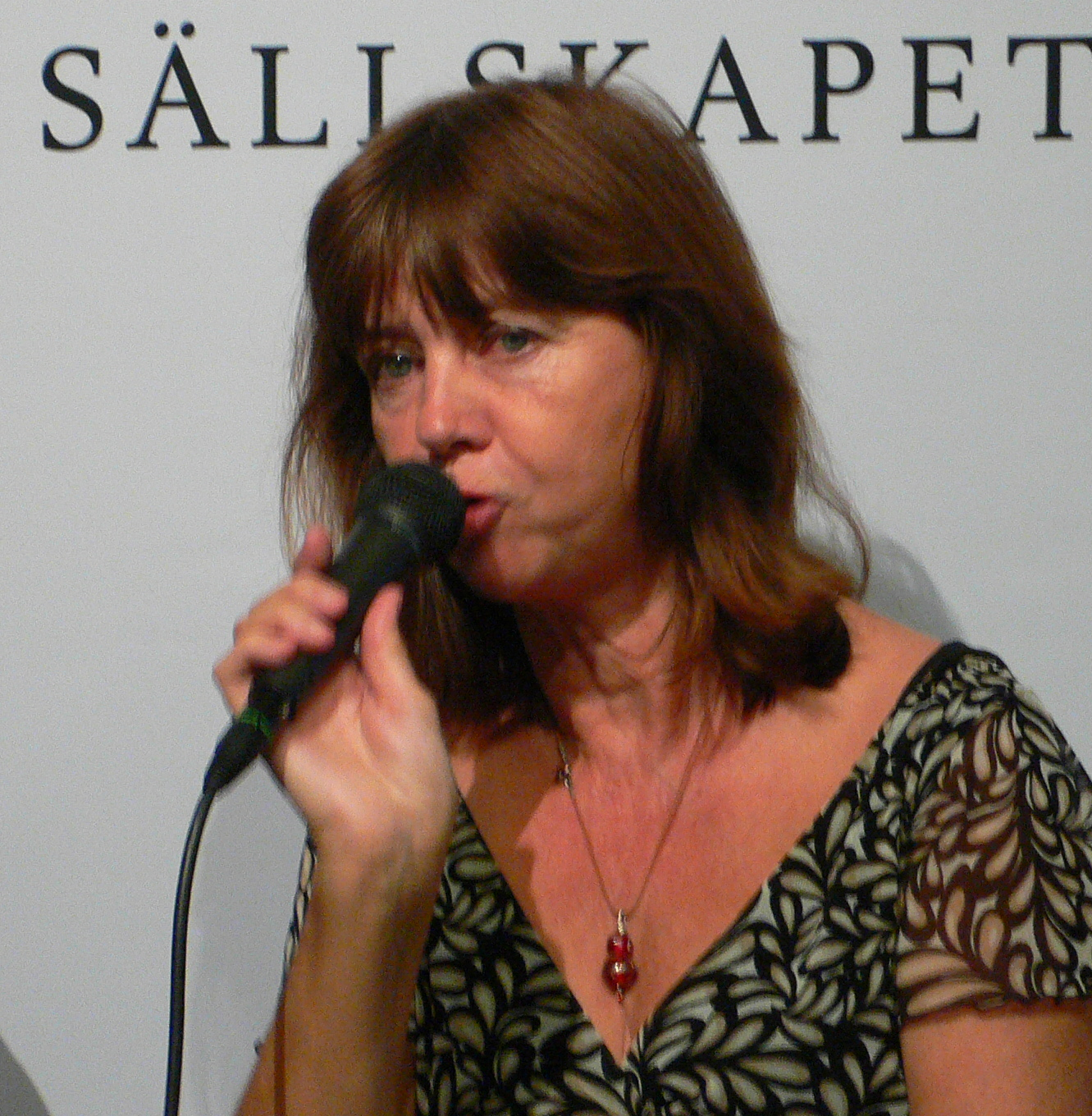
- Eggehorn in 2007
- Born: 6 March 1950 (age 76); Brännkyrka Parish, Sweden

Ylva Elisabet Eggehorn (born 6 March 1950) is a Swedish poet, writer, and hymnwriter. She is said to be among Sweden's most famous contemporary Christian writers and poets. Along with Christian poetry, she wrote for what's believed to be the first Swedish worship album. In other genres she did a "historical fantasy" concerning Gustav Badin, which deals some with his imagery as a "lover" in Swedish culture.
