= Benny Anderssons orkester (album) =

Studio album by Benny Anderssons orkester
- Released: 28 June 2001
- Recorded: Spring 2001
- Studio: Atlantis, Stockholm, Sweden
- Genre: Instrumental, folk
- Length: 47:28
- Label: Mono Music (MMCD 017)
- Producer: Benny Andersson

Benny Anderssons orkester chronology
November 1989 (1989)	Benny Anderssons orkester (2001)	BAO! (2004)

Singles from Benny Anderssons orkester
- 1. "Vår sista dans" Released: August 2001

Benny Anderssons orkester is the first album by Benny Anderssons orkester, released in June 2001.

== Album information ==
Benny Anderssons orkester, a folk music group founded in 2001 by former ABBA member Benny Andersson, follows the style of Andersson's two solo albums from the 1980s, Klinga mina klockor and November 1989. The album combines traditional Swedish folk music with classical, pop und jazz influences. Out of the 14 tracks on the album, 12 are instrumentals and two ("Vår sista dans" and "Lätt som en sommarfjäril") feature vocals by Helen Sjöholm, who played the role of Kristina in the musical Kristina från Duvemåla, written by Andersson and former ABBA colleague Björn Ulvaeus. Ulvaeus is credited on this album as well, writing the lyrics for the two aforementioned tracks. All music is composed by Benny Andersson, who also produced the album.

The album was recorded on two weekends in the spring of 2001 at Atlantis Studios in Stockholm. This studio, formerly known as Metronome Studio, was the location of many recording sessions for ABBA up until 1976. According to Andersson (the "Kapellmästaren", as he calls himself in the booklet), the recording of the album was "live", which means that all the instruments (including Helen Sjöholm's vocals) were recorded at the same time, in one session. Only slight changes were made afterwards, when the album was finally mixed at Andersson's Mono Music Studios.

Various recordings from this album have also been included on film soundtracks. The film Sånger från andra våningen by Roy Andersson includes "Sång från andra våningen", "Laureen" and "Tösabiten", and the film Nu är pappa trött igen by Marie-Louise Ekman features "Cirkus finemang" and "P.S.".

The song "Briggens blåögda blonda kapten" is a tribute to Görel Hanser (the "blue-eyed, blonde captain", as the title puts it), who has worked together with Andersson and ABBA since the 1970s. To this day, she is responsible for the business aspects of many of Andersson's productions. One of the largest, "Briggenteater Produktion", is responsible for Andersson and Ulvaeus's three musical theatre projects Kristina från Duvemåla, Chess and Mamma Mia!.

The album's opening track, "Hardangervidda", is named after the famous Hardangervidda mountain plateau in Norway.

Both vocal tracks on the album were later re-recorded with English lyrics. Benny Anderssons orkester themselves released an English version of their 2001 hit "Vår sista dans" in 2009 on their compilation album Story of a Heart, entitled "(If This Is) Our Last Dance" ("our last dance" being the literal translation of "vårs sista dans"). As on the original version, Helen Sjöholm contributed the vocals. The other song, "Lätt som en sommarfjäril", was recorded by Swedish mezzo-soprano Anne Sofie von Otter and released in 2006 on her album I Let the Music Speak, her tribute to the compositions of Benny Andersson. The lyrics for both English-language versions were again written by Björn Ulvaeus.

=== Reception and success ===
Professional ratings
Review scores
Source	Rating
Aftonbladet	link

Upon its release in the end of June 2001, Benny Anderssons Orkester immediately entered the Swedish Albums Chart, peaking at number 30 in the middle of July before dropping out of the chart again two weeks later. Due to some promotional appearances, amongst others performing on the TV series Allsång på Skansen, and the release of "Vår sista dans" on single, the album managed to return to the charts in August, eventually even topping them on September 19. Benny Anderssons Orkester stayed on the albums chart for a total of 55 weeks and received a gold and a platinum disc for selling more than 80,000 copies.

== Track listing ==
All music is composed by Benny Andersson

No.	Title	Length
1.	"Hardangervidda"	4:09
2.	"Snedseglarn"	2:46
3.	"Cirkus finemang"	4:19
4.	"Vår sista dans" (lyrics by Björn Ulvaeus; vocals by Helen Sjöholm)	4:49
5.	"Briggens blåögda blonda kapten"	3:52
6.	"Knasluvan"	1:57
7.	"Anitas polska"	3:17
8.	"Schottis i tyrolen"	2:56
9.	"Sång från andra våningen"	3:46
10.	"Laureen"	4:28
11.	"Tösabiten"	3:08
12.	"Nya månvalsen"	3:06
13.	"Lätt som en sommarfjäril" (lyrics by Björn Ulvaeus; vocals by Helen Sjöholm)	3:43
14.	"P.S."	1:04
Total length:		47:28

== Personnel ==
The following musicians contributed to Benny Anderssons Orkester:

- Benny Andersson:accordion, piano, synclavier
- Göran Arnberg: organ
- Janne Bengtsson: flute, piccola, krumhorns
- Pär Grebacken: saxophone, clarinet, flute, piccola, block-flute
- Leif Göras: violin, cello
- (Nils-Erik) Nicke Göthe: violin
- (Jan-Erik) Jogga Ernlund: contrabass
- Calle Jacobsson: tuba
- Leif Lindvall: trumpet, cornet
- Kalle Moraeus: violin, zither, guitar
- Olle Moraeus: violin
- (Pererik) Perra Moraeus: violin, circus-saxophone
- Lars Rudolfsson: accordion
- Helen Sjöholm: vocals
- Jörgen Stenberg: drums, percussion

== Charts ==
=== Weekly charts ===
Chart (2001)	Peak position
Swedish Albums (Sverigetopplistan)	1

=== Year-end charts ===
Chart (2001)	Position
Swedish Albums (Sverigetopplistan)	12
Chart (2002)	Position
Swedish Albums (Sverigetopplistan)	26
