= Adolf Fredrik's Youth Choir =

Church choir

Adolf Fredrik's Youth Choir is a Swedish co-educational choir comprising singers from the ages of 16 to 25. The choir was founded in 2000. During recent years, the choir has performed both in Sweden and abroad. It has also received awards at international choir festivals. The choir is a part of the Adolf Fredrik's Church in Stockholm and was founded by Karin Bäckström, one of the parish's organists and choral directors. (Note: Adolf Fredrik's Girls Choir, Adolf Fredrik's Boys Choir, and the mixed Adolf Fredrik's Chamber Choir are part of Adolf Fredrik's Music School and have only their names in common with the Youth Choir. Adolf Fredriks Madrigalkör used to be associated with the church, but is now independent from both the church and the school.)

The singers have a thoroughbred background, involving a high level of weekly music training. At present, most of the members are studying music at music colleges in the Stockholm area.

The choir's main role is to sing at parish services and concerts. During recent years they have made critically acclaimed performances of Mozart's Requiem and Vivaldi's Gloria.

== Awards ==
In 2006, the choir won a gold medal in the international choir competition in Preveza, Greece. In 2009 they received the Grand Prix award in Sopot, Poland.

== Performances ==
The choir's Lucia concert, called From Darkness into Light, is given annually in Adolf Fredrik's Church. This has led to many opportunities for international performance, including Lucia concerts given at The European Union Conference in Prague in 2007, The Swedish-American Entrepreneurial Days in Stockholm in 2008 and in Westminster cathedral and the Swedish Embassy in Dublin and London the same year.

A selection of larger performances the choir has made during the last years.

- Wolfgang Amadeus Mozart Requiem with members from Stockholms Sinfonietta
- Frank Martin Mass for double choir
- Antonio Vivaldi Gloria with Susanne Rydén and Michael Bellini as soloists
- Sofie Livebrant Mary's Question
- Erik Steen Misa Flamenca (first performance recorded by Swedish Radio)
- Felicity Laurence African Madonna
- Karin Bäckström The Lost Paradise
- Lars-Erik Larsson God in Disguise

== Discography ==
In December 2009 the choir released their first CD From Darkness into Light (Från mörker till ljus in Swedish) containing the music from the Lucia concert bearing the same name. The CD was recorded by Bertil Alving.
