= Benny Anderssons orkester =

Musical group

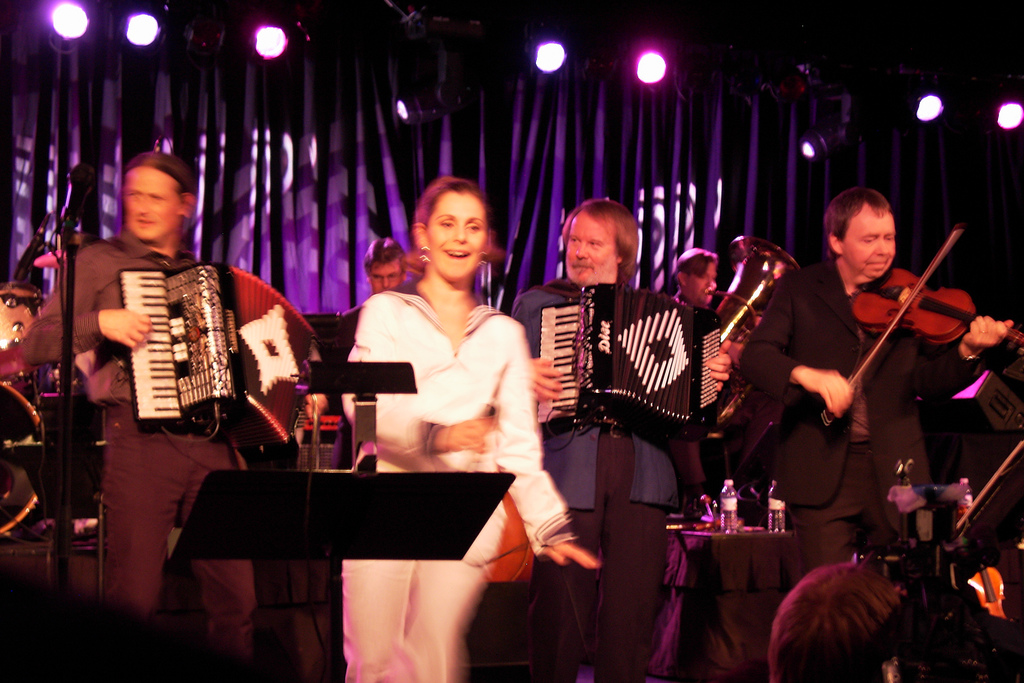
- Benny Anderssons orkester live in Minnesota, US, in March 2006

Background information
- Genres: Dansband music, folk, pop
- Years active: 2001–present
- Labels: Mono

Benny Anderssons orkester (also known as BAO, Benny Andersson Band) is a Swedish band, with Benny Andersson as musical leader and composer. The band was formed in mid-2001 by 16 people, some from Orsa Spelmän, and Helen Sjöholm and since 2004 Tommy Körberg as singers. The name literally means "Benny Andersson's orchestra".

== Members ==
BAO includes some of Sweden's most experienced contemporary and folk musicians:

- Benny Andersson – accordion, piano, synclavier, etc.
- Göran Arnberg – pipe organ, spinet
- Janne Bengtson – flute, piccolo, crumhorn, baritone saxophone
- Pär Grebacken – saxophones, clarinet, recorder, piccolo
- Leif Göras – violin, cello, mandolin
- Nicke (Nils-Erik) Göthe – violin, mandolin
- Jogga (Jan-Anders) Ernlund – contrabass
- Calle Jakobsson – tuba, valve trombone
- Leif Lindvall – trumpet, cornet
- Kalle Moraeus – violin, zither, guitar, banjo, etc.
- Olle Moraeus – violin, viola, mandolin
- Perra (Per-Erik) Moraeus – violin, mandolin, saxophone
- Lars Rudolfsson – accordion
- Jörgen Stenberg – drums, percussion instruments
- Tommy Körberg – vocals, guitar
- Helen Sjöholm – vocals, originally chosen as a backup singer, but is now also considered a permanent member of the band

All members of the band are occupied in external capacities during the majority of the year, some in the theater orchestras in Stockholm. The brothers Moraeus, Leif Göras and Nicke Göthe play together in Orsa Spelmän. During the summers the members of BAO meet up and rehearse, and then go out on mini-tours, to which tickets are highly sought after. The concept of these tours are "a concert with dance", so a dance floor is brought along. Körberg and Sjöholm together perform the vocals for the non-instrumental songs.

== Discography ==
=== Albums ===
List of albums, with Swedish chart positions
Title	Album details	SWE Chart		Certifications (Sweden)	Chart entries in other countries
Title	Album details	Peak position	Time in (weeks)	Certifications (Sweden)	Chart entries in other countries
Benny Anderssons orkester	Released: 28 June 2001; 1st studio album; Label: Mono Music (MMCD 017); Format: CD	1 (1w)	55	Gold (26 September 2001); Platinum (29 January 2002)	—
BAO! with Helen Sjöholm	Released: 25 June 2004; 2nd studio album; Label: Mono Music (MMCD 021); Format: CD	1 (1w)	55	Gold (19 July 2004); Platinum (28 September 2004)	—
BAO på turné with Helen Sjöholm and Tommy Körberg	Released: 11 May 2006; Live album; Label: Mono Music (MMCD 022); Format: CD	6	28	—	—
BAO 3 with Helen Sjöholm and Tommy Körberg	Released: 24 October 2007; 3rd studio album; Label: Mono Music (MMCD 023); Format: CD, digital	3	34	Gold (5 February 2008)	—
Story of a Heart as "Benny Andersson Band"	Released: 26 June 2009; Compilation, international; Label: Mono Music (MMCD 025); Format: CD, digital	5	11	—	Norway: No. 10 (5 weeks); UK: No. 29
O klang och jubeltid with Helen Sjöholm and Tommy Körberg	Released: 15 June 2011; 4th studio album; Label: Mono Music (MMCD 027); Format: CD, digital	1 (2w)	46	Gold (16 August 2011); Platinum (27 February 2012)	—
Tomten har åkt hem with Helen Sjöholm and Tommy Körberg	Released: 19 November 2012; 5th studio album (Christmas); Label: Mono Music (MMCD 029); Format: CD, digital	4	9		—
BAO in Box with Helen Sjöholm and Tommy Körberg	Released: 19 November 2012; Compilation, box set; Label: Mono Music (MMCD 030 BOX); Format: Box set (6×CD, 2×DVD)	5	15		—
Mitt hjärta klappar för dig with Helen Sjöholm and Tommy Körberg	Released: 10 June 2016; Label: Mono Music (MMCD 030 BOX); Format: CD, download	2	19		—
Bästa låtarna with Helen Sjöholm and Tommy Körberg	Released: 14 June 2019; Label: Mono Music; Format: CD, download, streaming	5	2		—
Alla kan dansa with Helen Sjöholm and Tommy Körberg	Released: 27 September 2024; Label: Mono Music; Format: CD, download, streaming	8	1		—

=== Singles ===
List of singles, with Swedish chart positions
Title	Vocalist	Label	Year	SWE chart		UK chart	Album
Title	Vocalist	Label	Year	Peak position	Time in (weeks)	UK chart	Album
"Vår sista dans"	Helen Sjöholm	Mono Music MMCD S-125	2001	56	4	—	Benny Anderssons orkester
"Du är min man"	Helen Sjöholm	Mono Music MMCD S-128	2004	—	—	—	BAO!
"Midnattsdans"	Helen Sjöholm, Kalle Moraeus	Mono Music MMCD S-129	2004	—	—	—	BAO!
"Det är vi ändå"	Helen Sjöholm, Tommy Körberg	Mono Music MMCD S-130	2006	—	—	—	BAO på turné
"Fait Accomplit"	Tommy Körberg	Mono Music MMCD S-131	2007	—	—	—	BAO 3
"Du frälste mig i sista stund"	Helen Sjöholm	Mono Music MMCD S-132	2007	—	—	—	BAO 3
"Sommaren du fick"	Helen Sjöholm	Mono Music MMCD S-134	2009	17	3	—	Story of a Heart
"Story of a Heart"	Helen Sjöholm	Mono Music MMCD S-135	2009	—	—	83	Story of a Heart
"Kära syster"	Helen Sjöholm	Mono Music MMCD S-137	2011	—	—	—	O klang och jubeltid
"Allt syns när man är naken"	Helen Sjöholm, Tommy Körberg & Kalle Moraeus	Mono Music MMCD S-138	2011	—	—	—	O klang och jubeltid
"—" denotes releases that did not chart

==== Svensktoppen ====
List of songs that appeared on the radio chart Svensktoppen, with chart positions
Title	Vocalist	Date of entry	Svensktoppen		Album
Title	Vocalist	Date of entry	Peak position	Time in (weeks)	Album
"Vår sista dans"	Helen Sjöholm	11 August 2001	1 (12w)	30	Benny Anderssons orkester
"Lätt som en sommarfjäril"	Helen Sjöholm	27 April 2002	4	17	Benny Anderssons orkester
"Cirkus finemang"		14 September 2002	8	3	Benny Anderssons orkester
"Du är min man"	Helen Sjöholm	4 July 2004	1 (65w)	278	BAO!
"Det är vi ändå"	Helen Sjöholm, Tommy Körberg	21 May 2006	1 (15w)	43	BAO på turné
"Fait Accomplit"	Tommy Körberg	1 December 2007	1 (11w)	19	BAO 3
"Du frälste mig i sista stund"	Helen Sjöholm	18 May 2008	—	—	BAO 3
"Nu mår jag mycket bättre"	Helen Sjöholm, Tommy Körberg	24 August 2008	4	14	BAO 3
"Sommaren du fick"	Helen Sjöholm	2 August 2009	4	4	Story of a Heart
"En dag i sänder"	Helen Sjöholm	31 July 2011	1 (11w)	39	O klang och jubeltid
"—" denotes releases that did not chart

== Awards and nominations ==
=== Grammis ===
Grammis is a national Swedish music prize governed by IFPI Sweden and awarded annually in numerous categories for best recordings released in the previous year.

Following are the Grammis awards and nominations received by Benny Anderssons orkester:

Year	Category	Album Title	Status
2002	Ballad/Folk Music (Årets Visa/Folk)	Benny Anderssons orkester	Nominated
2005	Traditional Song/Dance Music Orchestra (Årets schlager/dansband)	BAO!	Won
2007	Traditional Song/Dance Music Orchestra (Årets schlager/dansband)	BAO på turné	Won
2008	Traditional Dance Music Orchestra/Song (Årets dansband/schlager)	BAO 3	Won
2010	Traditional Dance Music Orchestra (Årets dansband)	Story of a Heart	Nominated
2012	Traditional Dance Music Orchestra (Årets dansband)	O klang och jubeltid	Won
2017	Traditional Dance Music Orchestra (Årets dansband)	Mitt hjärta klappar för dig	Nominated

== Other appearances ==
- Beginner's Guide to Scandinavia (3CD, Nascente 2011)
