= Klinga mina klockor =

Studio album by Benny Andersson
- Released: 1987
- Genre: Folk
- Label: Mono Music

Benny Andersson chronology
Klinga mina klockor (1987)	November 1989 (1989)

Klinga mina klockor (Ring my Bells) is an album by Benny Andersson released in 1987. This album of Swedish folk music was a hit in Scandinavia.

== Track listing ==
1. Inledningsvisa (Benny Andersson) - 2.00
2. Lottis Schottis (Benny Andersson & Björn Ulvaeus) - 1.55
3. Födelsedagsvals till Mona (Benny Andersson & Björn Ulvaeus) - 2.20
4. Om Min Syster (Benny Andersson) - 2.57
5. Efter Regnet (Benny Andersson, Text: Mats Nörklit) - 3.00
6. Ludvigs Leksakspolka (Benny Andersson) - 1.48
7. Gladan (Benny Andersson) - 1.38
8. Långsammazurkan (Benny Andersson) - 2.09
9. Tittis Sång (Benny Andersson) - 2.59
10. Trolskan (Benny Andersson & Björn Ulvaeus) - 2.03
11. Klinga mina klockor (Ring my Bells) (Benny Andersson, Text: Björn Ulvaeus) - 11.30

== Miscellanea ==
- Anni-Frid Lyngstad the ex-member of ABBA and Benny Andersson's ex-wife participated in the choir in the song Klinga mina klockor.

== See also ==
- Benny Andersson
- Orsa Spelmän
- Swedish Radio Symphony Orchestra
- ABBA
