= Orsa Spelmän =

Swedish folk music group

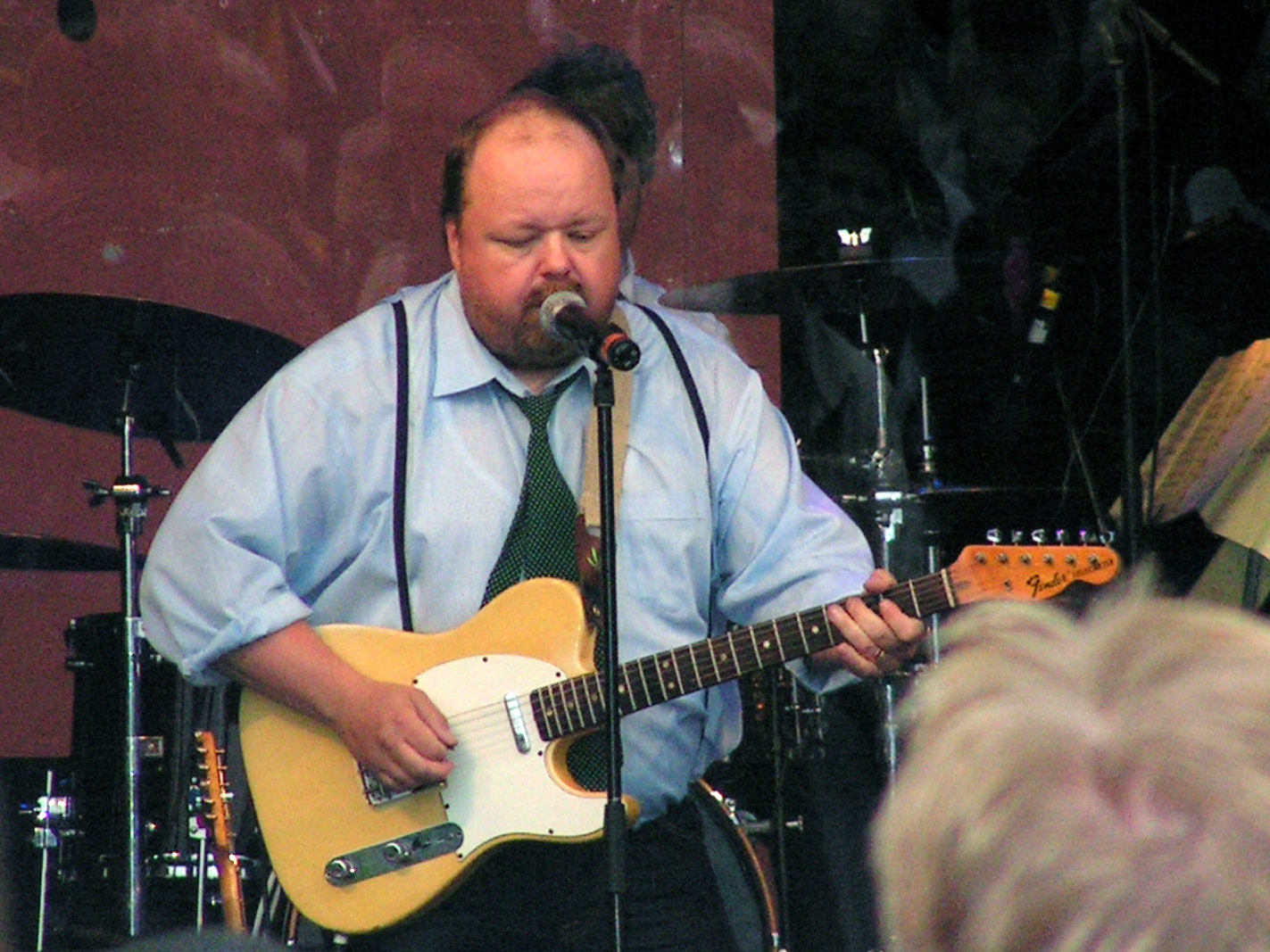
- Orsa Spelmän's Kalle Moraeus

Background information
- Origin: Orsa, Sweden
- Genres: Folk
- Years active: 1987–present
- Members: Per-Erik "Perra" Moraeus; Olle Moraeus; Nils-Erik "Nicke" Göthe; Leif Göras; Kalle Moraeus; Larsåke Leksell

Orsa Spelmän is a folk music (Spelman) sextet from Orsa in Sweden.

In 1987, the former ABBA member Benny Andersson and Orsa Spelmän began a musical partnership with the recording of the album Klinga mina klockor. In 2001 the group became part of Benny Anderssons orkester (BAO).

In 2006, member Kalle Moraeus was awarded Povel Ramels Karamelodiktstipendium.

Orsa Spelmän have so far released four albums, Orsa Spelmän (1988), Fiolin Min (1990), Ödra (1998) and Orsa nästa (2006), and appear on several records together with Benny Anderssons Orkester.

== Discography ==
=== Singles ===
Year	Single	Peak positions	Album
Year	Single	SWE	Album
2010	"Underbart" (Kalle Moraeus & Orsa Spelmän)	16	Kalle Moraeus album Underbart
2010	"Benny Anderssons bröllopssång" (Storkyrkans Kör / Orsa Spelmän / G. Sjökvists Kammarkör)	43	
