= Kalle Moraeus =

Musical artist

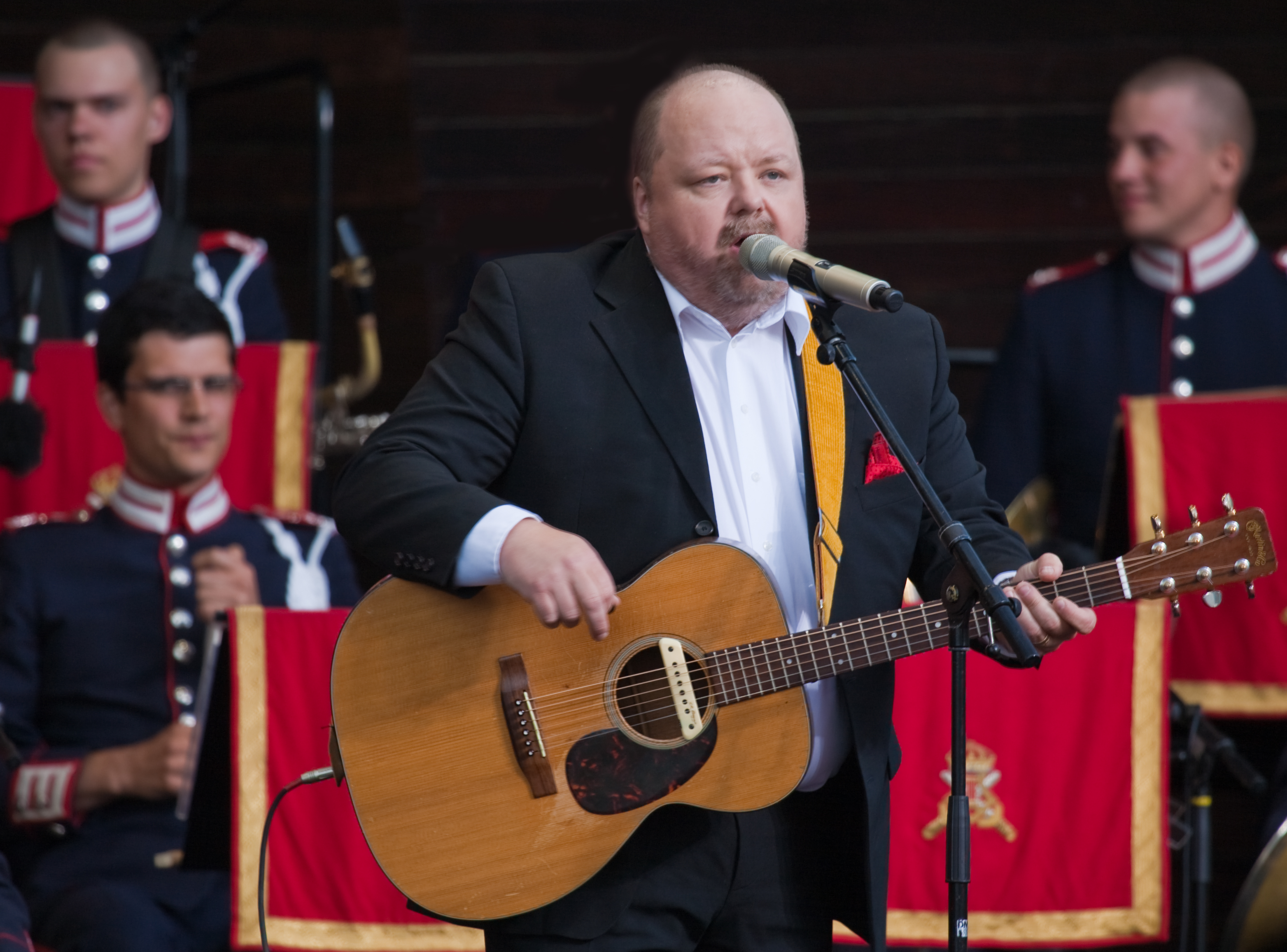
- Kalle Moraeus performing at Nationaldagen in 2010

Background information
- Born: Karl Anders Moraeus; 15 July 1963 (age 62); Mora, Sweden
- Genres: Folk, Classical
- Occupations: Musician, actor, singer-songwriter, television presenter
- Instruments: Violin, vocals, guitar, mandolin
- Years active: 1984–present
- Label: Mono Music

Karl Anders "Kalle" Moraeus (born 15 July 1963) is a Swedish musician, actor, composer and television presenter.

Moraeus was born in Mora. He is a member of the folk group Orsa Spelmän and Benny Anderssons Orkester, founded by former ABBA member Benny Andersson. Amongst numerous recordings with these bands, he has also released a couple of solo albums, most recently album and single Underbart, both being successful in the Swedish charts in 2010.

== Discography ==
=== Solo albums ===
Year	Album	Peak positions	Certification
Year	Album	SWE	Certification
1991	Kalle Moraeus	–	
2010	Underbart	4	
2013	Komma hem	3	

=== Compilation albums ===
Year	Album	Peak positions	Certification
Year	Album	SWE	Certification
2014	Kalles Bästa	15	

=== Collaborative albums ===
- 2001: Live in Köttsjön - Kalle & Bengan
- 2003: Bitå - Kalle Moreaus & Hej Kalle
- 2005: Julens bästa vänner - Kalle & Bengan

=== Singles ===
Year	Single	Peak positions	Album
Year	Single	SWE	Album
2010	"Underbart" (Kalle Moraeus & Orsa Spelmän)	16	Underbart
2018	"Min dröm" (Kalle Moraeus & Orsa Spelmän)	—	Non-album single

== Filmography ==
- 1994: Illusioner
- 1999: Adam & Eva
- 2006: Nisse Hults historiska snedsteg (TV series)
