= Tommy Körberg =

Swedish singer and actor (born 1948)

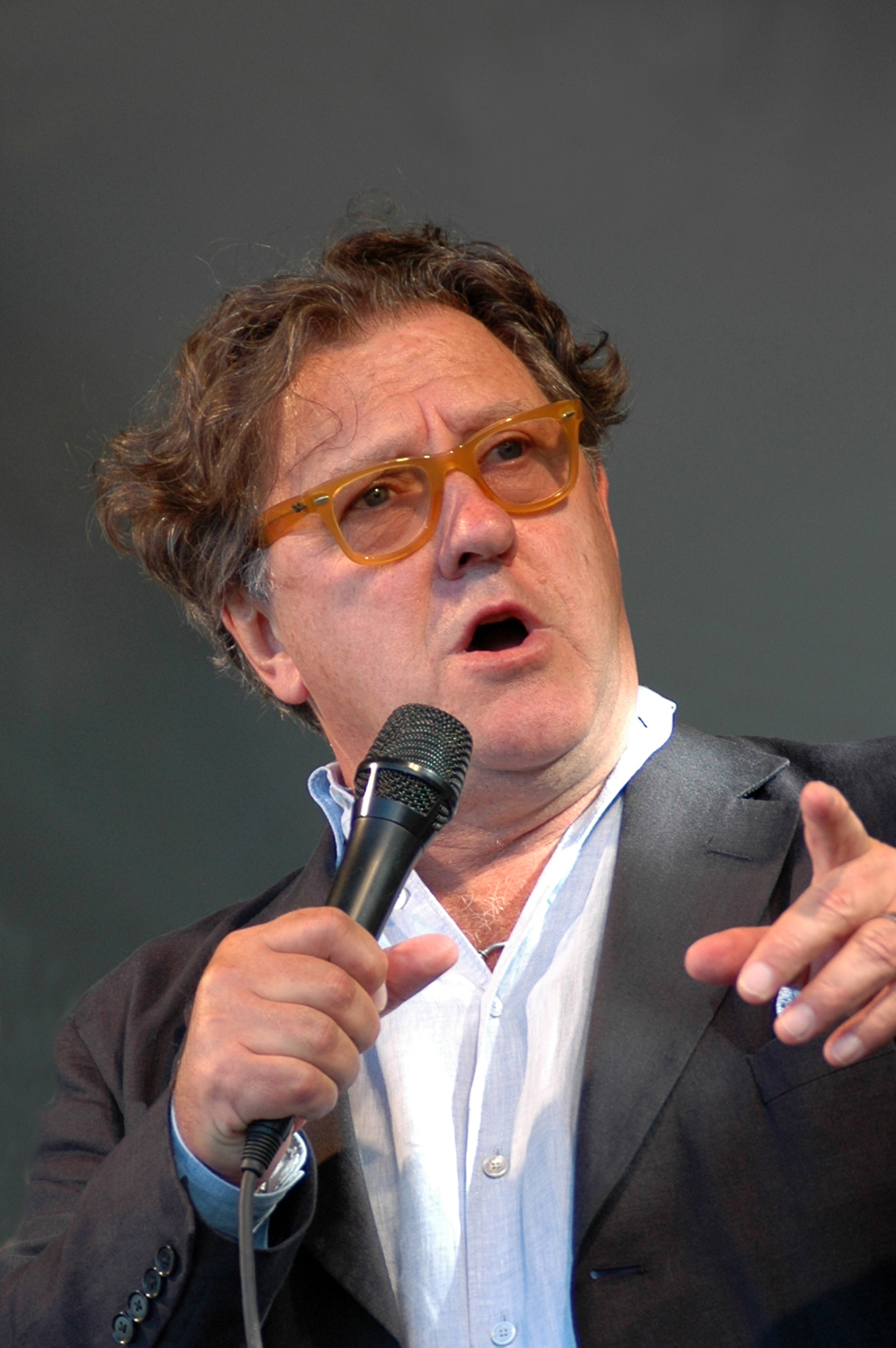
- Körberg in 2009

Background information
- Born: Bert Gustav Tommy Körberg; 4 July 1948 (age 77)
- Origin: Norsjö, Sweden
- Genres: Pop, Schlager
- Occupations: Singer, actor, musician
- Spouse: Anne-Charlotte Nilsson (m. 2007)

Bert Gustav Tommy Körberg (Swedish pronunciation: [ˈtɔ̌mːʏ ˈɕœ̂ːrbærj]; born 4 July 1948) is a Swedish singer, actor and musician. English-speaking audiences know him best for his role as Anatoly/"The Russian" in the musical Chess. He played the role on the 1984 concept album, and on stage in the 1986 world premiere West End production in London, as well as several times since. Körberg has represented Sweden in the Eurovision Song Contest twice: 1969 (when he finished ninth) and 1988 (when he finished twelfth).

Körberg has also played the lead role in many Swedish productions of other musicals.

== Career ==
From 1965 to 1968, Körberg was a singer in the Swedish pop group Tom & Mick & Maniacs, which went through several name changes. In August 1967, the group released the single "Somebody's Taken Maria Away", a cover of an Adam Faith song from 1965. The song went on to top the official Tio i Topp record chart for six consecutive weeks. The group had two additional hits on the chart: "Please, Please, Please" reached number five in April 1967 and "I (Who Have Nothing)" peaked at number eight in February 1968.

Following Tom & Mick & Maniacs' break-up in 1968, Körberg released his first solo album Nature Boy.

Körberg has represented Sweden in the Eurovision Song Contest on two occasions. In 1969 he finished ninth with "Judy, min vän" and in 1988 he finished twelfth with "Stad i ljus".

He has also appeared in the Swedish productions of other musicals, usually in a starring role, including The Sound of Music and Les Misérables (as Jean Valjean). He was a supporting actor in the 1984 Swedish fantasy film Ronia, the Robber's Daughter, based on the novel by the same name by Swedish author Astrid Lindgren.

Körberg voiced the Beast in the Swedish dub of Beauty and the Beast, and also sang the Swedish version of the title song on the soundtrack. In the 1990s and 2000s, he took time off from other projects in order to recreate the role of Anatoly/"The Russian" in subsequent productions of Chess, including the 1994 tenth anniversary concert and the 2002 Stockholm production. For years, he collaborated with Monica and Carl-Axel Dominique in the experimental group Solar Plexus. In his own performances, he has worked extensively with Stefan Nilsson, and including songs by Jacques Brel.

Körberg is also a frequent performer with Benny Andersson's band, Benny Anderssons Orkester (BAO), singing mostly dance music and music by Andersson. In 2008 he starred in the musical Dirty Rotten Scoundrels at Cirkus in Stockholm, and in 2009 he played Professor Henry Higgins in My Fair Lady in Stockholm acting opposite Helen Sjöholm, who portrayed the role of Eliza Doolittle.

In the autumn of 2010, Körberg and his long-time friend Claes Malmberg gave a show in Gothenburg called The Big Bang Show. He was one of three judges on the Swedish reality television singing competition True Talent, which ran for one season in 2011. In 2013 he competed in Melodifestivalen 2013, Sweden's selection for the Eurovision Song Contest 2013, with the song "En Riktig Jävla Schlager" with the group Ravaillacz. They ended up in 10th place in the final.

In 1995, he was invited as one of the seventeen Jean Valjeans from around the world to perform the encore of the Les Misérables 10th Anniversary Concert at the Royal Albert Hall in London.

In 2017, he appeared as a guest performer on the album "Worlds Collide" by Swedish metalcore band Dead By April, singing on the last song, "For Every Step".

In January and February 2025, he's set to return to Les Misérables in the Arena Spectacular World Tour as The Bishop of Digne opposite Peter Jöback as Valjean.

== Awards and honors ==
In 1969, he won a Swedish Recording Industry Award Grammis in the category Best Debut Performance.

Körberg was nominated for a Laurence Olivier Award in the category Outstanding Performance by an Actor in a Musical, for his role in the 1986 world premiere of Chess.

For the 2002 Swedish production of Chess, he won a Guldmasken, the national Swedish theater award, in the category Best Actor in a Musical.

== Personal life ==
Körberg was born in Norsjö. He is the father of actor and musician Anton Körberg, from his relationship with actress Anki Lidén. In July 2007, he married Anne-Charlotte Nilsson.

== Selected discography ==
Swedish

- 1969 – Judy min vän
- 1970 – Tommy
- 1971 – Tommy Körberg
- 1972 – Solar Plexus (Solar Plexus; Carl-Axel Dominique, Monica Dominique, Georg Wadenius, Tommy Borgudd, Tommy Körberg)
- 1973 – Solar Plexus 2 (Solar Plexus; Carl-Axel Dominique, Monica Dominique, Bosse Häggström, Tommy Borgudd, Tommy Körberg)
- 1973 – Tommy Körberg sjunger Birger Sjöberg
- 1974 – Solar Plexus: Det är inte båten som gungar, det är havet som rör sig
- 1975 – Solar Plexus: Hellre gycklare än hycklare
- 1976 – Den vackraste visan
- 1979 – Blixtlås (Tommy Körberg, Stefan Nilsson)
- 1982 – Tommy Körberg och Stefan Nilsson tolkar Jaques Brel
- 1988 – Spotlight: Tommy Körberg
- 1988 – ...är...
- 1988 – "Stad i ljus"
- 1989 – Julen är här
- 1990 – Livslevande
- 1990 – Les Miserables-musical (original Swedish cast recording)
- 1992 – Jag skulle vilja våga tro
- 1994 – Ravaillac
- 1995 – Sound of Music-musical (original Swedish cast recording)
- 1997 – Aniara
- 1998 – Från Waterloo till Duvemåla (From Waterloo to Duvemåla)- various artists
- 1999 – Sånger för ensamma älskare
- 2000 – Hits
- 2000 – Stilla natt (Tommy Körberg & Oslo Gospel Choir)
- 2003 – Gränslös – det bästa
- 2003 – Chess på svenska (Chess in Swedish)-musical (original Swedish 2002 cast recording)
- 2006 – BAO på turné (BAO on tour) (Benny Anderssons Orkester with Helen Sjöholm & Tommy Körberg)
- 2007 – BAO 3 (Benny Anderssons Orkester with Helen Sjöholm & Tommy Körberg)
- 2007 – Rakt upp och ner (CD+DVD)
- 2012 – Sjung tills du stupar

English

- 1968 – Nature Boy
- 1969 – Tommy Körberg Spotlight
- 1968 – Don't Get Around Much Any More
- 1976 – Where Do We Begin (Made in Sweden; Jojje Wadenius, Tommy Körberg, Wlodek Gulgowski, Pekka Pohjola, Vesa Aaltonen)
- 1984 – Chess
- 1984 – Walk Between The Raindrops (Tommy Körberg and Tolvan Big Band)
- 1993 – Live in London
- 1994 – Chess in Concert
- 1996 – Evergreens
- 2009 – Story of a Heart (The Benny Andersson Band)
- 2010 – Songs for Drinkers and Other Thinkers
- 2018 – For Every Step (Tommy Körberg and Dead by April)

Awards and achievements
| Preceded by Claes-Göran Hederström | Sweden in the Eurovision Song Contest; 1969 | Succeeded by Family Four |
| Preceded by Lotta Engberg | Sweden in the Eurovision Song Contest; 1988 | Succeeded by Tommy Nilsson |
