= Mono Music =

Swedish record label

Mono Music is a Swedish record label, established in 1987 by former ABBA member Benny Andersson.

The Mono Music offices as well as the Mono Music studio, which is mainly used for mixing sessions, are located on the island of Skeppsholmen in central Stockholm. In 2009, a new recording studio has been built inside a brick building from 1874, next to the existing Mono Music buildings, called Rixmixmingsverket,or RMV Studio.

Most of Benny's recordings and productions have been released under this label, including the musical Kristina från Duvemåla and his albums with Benny Anderssons Orkester. The first release (MMCD 001) was Benny Andersson's first ever solo album, called Klinga mina klockor. The most recent release has been the album O klang och jubeltid by Benny Anderssons Orkester, which received good reviews and entered the Swedish albums chart at number 3 in June 2011.

Since 1987, 27 albums have been released under the Mono Music label.
