= Helen Sjöholm =

Swedish singer, actress and musical theatre performer

Marie Helen Sjöholm
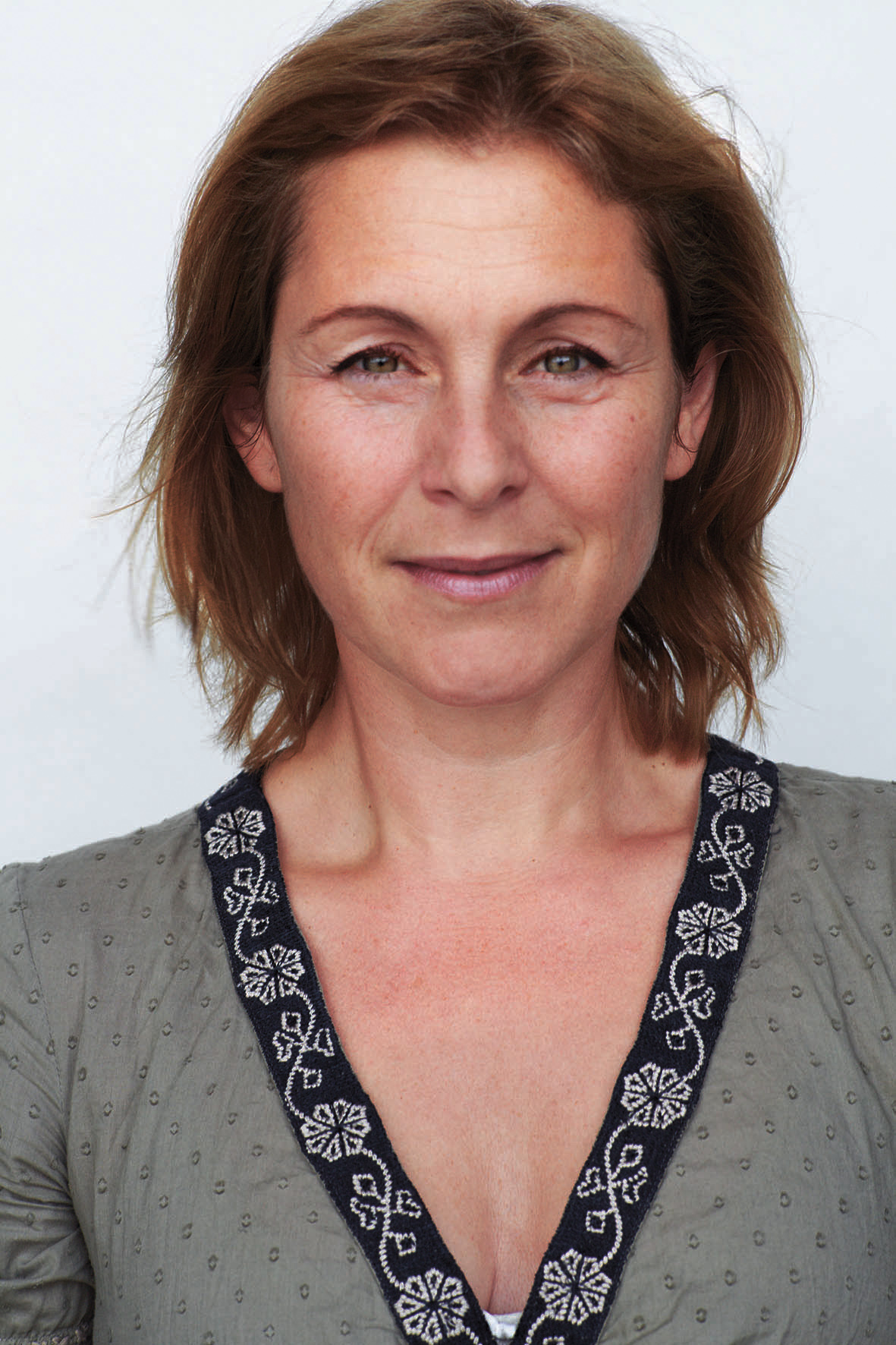
- Helen Sjöholm in September 2012
- Born: 10 July 1970 (age 55); Sundsvall, Sweden
- Occupations: singer, actress
- Website: blixten.se/helen-sjoholm helensjoholm.se

Marie Helen Sjöholm (Swedish pronunciation: [hɛˈleːn ˈɧø̌ːhɔlm]; born 10 July 1970) is a Swedish singer, actress and musical theatre performer who lives in Gamla Enskede in Stockholm. She grew up in Sundsvall and started to sing in choirs at an early age, working, among others, with Swedish conductor Kjell Lönnå. By the end of the 1980s she toured with the group "Just for Fun".

== Career ==
Her career as a performer of musical theatre began with small-scale concert presentations of Chess, in which she sang the role of Florence. She took part in a number of smaller productions, including Little Dorrit in Enskede and the musical Elvira Madigan at Malmö Music Theatre in Malmö, Sweden.

Her big breakthrough occurred in 1995 when she created the title role in Benny Andersson and Björn Ulvaeus' Kristina från Duvemåla, which she played on and off for nearly four years (during the musical's entire run). Minneapolis Star and Tribune in its review of the concert version of the musical performed by the original cast in Minneapolis, Minnesota in 1996 described her as "extraordinary" (14 October 1996, page 05B). In 1998, she played Hodel in Fiddler on the Roof, taking a break from Kristina. In 2000, she returned to Malmö Music Theatre to portray the role of Fantine in Les Misérables, and in 2002 she created the role of Florence in the reconceived Swedish production of Chess, opposite original London star Tommy Körberg as Anatoly. Having left this production upon closing in 2003, Sjöholm took part in Chinarevyn, a revue starring many well-known Swedish performers including Magnus Härenstam, Lasse Berghagen, Loa Falkman, Sissela Kyle and herself.

Helen Sjöholm has also toured extensively throughout Sweden with Georg Wadenius and Martin Östergren and she has released two albums, Visor (2002) (a collection of more or less well-known Swedish folk songs in new arrangements by Östergren) and Genom varje andetag (2003) (featuring music and lyrics by jazz pianist Anders Widmark).

She first appeared on the big screen in 1999, appearing in Där regnbågen slutar by Richard Hobert. In 2004, she returned to the movies, portraying the role of Gabriella in Kay Pollak's much-debated Så som i himmelen (As It Is in Heaven).

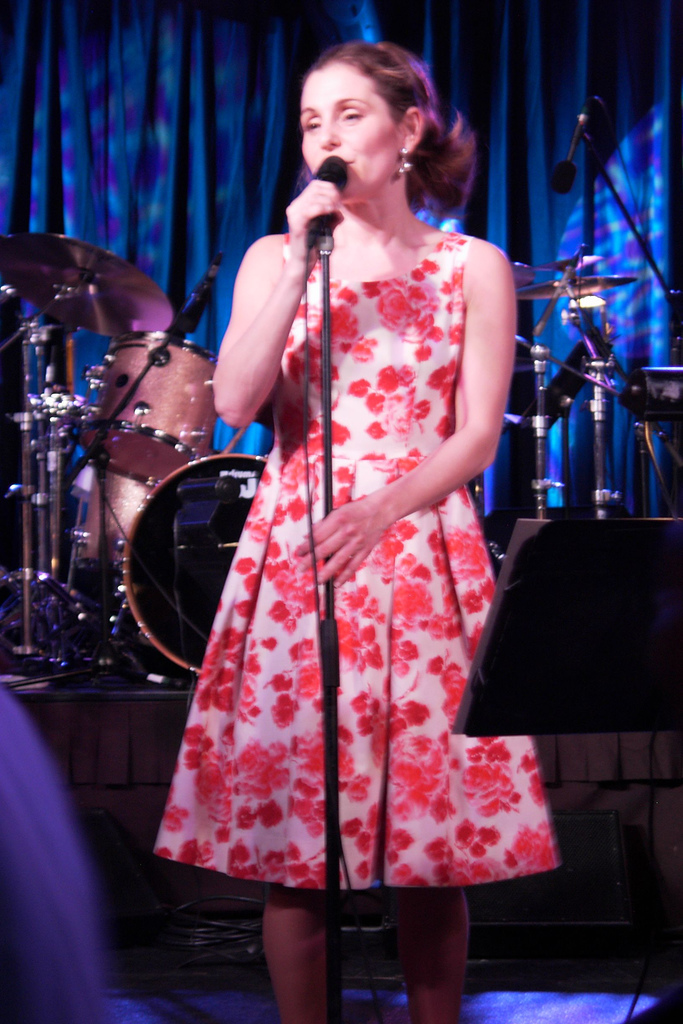
Sjöholm singing with Benny Anderssons Orkester in Minnesota, 2006

She is also a frequent performer with Benny Andersson's band, Benny Anderssons Orkester (BAO), singing mostly dance music and music by Andersson. Additionally, she has appeared in numerous gala concerts including Rhapsody in Rock.

On 4 July 2009, Helen performed as lead female singer with the Benny Andersson Band (the name by which BAO is known outside Sweden) at a free concert on Hampstead Heath in London to mark Sweden's presidency of the EU. The concert comprised a mixture of BAO classics, traditional Swedish folk, Bach, Shostakovich, old British pub singalong Roll Out the Barrell, ABBA and even Cadillac by the Hep Stars.

An English album by the Benny Andersson Band was released on 6 July 2009 with some of the Swedish original songs having been translated into English and a new song (Story of a Heart) which is also the title of the album. The song was first played on 25 May 2009 on BBC Radio 2 on The Ken Bruce show presented by Zoë Ball and after received significant airplay on the station, including being added to the station's A-list.

On 11 June 2009, it was announced that Helen would perform in the English version of Kristina från Duvemåla (outside Sweden called Kristina) in a concert version of the musical at Carnegie Hall, New York, on 23 and 24 September 2009. She sang as her previous title character while Russell Watson sang as Karl Oskar. She received standing ovations on both nights for her rendition of You Have to Be There (Du måste finnas). The concerts themselves in the main received rave reviews, with a CD release of the live recording issued in May 2010.

Hit recordings include "Du måste finnas" ("You Have to Be There") from the symphonic musical Kristina från Duvemåla (Kristina), "Vår sista dans" ("If this is Our Last Dance") with Benny Andersson's orkester, "Gabriellas sång" (from film Så som i himmelen a.k.a. As It Is In Heaven), "Jag vet vad han vill" (a.k.a. "I Know Him So Well") from musical Chess, "Det är vi ändå" (with Tommy Körberg and Benny Anderssons Orkester), and "Du är min man" ("You Are My Man") with Benny Anderssons Orkester, among others.

== Discography ==
=== Selected discography (Swedish) ===
- 1997 – Kristina från Duvemåla-musical (original Swedish cast recording)
- 1998 – Från Waterloo till Duvemåla (From Waterloo to Duvemåla)- various artists
- 2001 – Benny Anderssons Orkester (with Benny Andersson's Orchestra/Band)
- 2002 – Visor (Songs)
- 2003 – Chess på svenska (Chess in Swedish)-musical (original Swedish 2002 cast recording)
- 2003 – Genom varje andetag (Through Every Breath) (with Anders Widmark)
- 2004 – BAO! (Benny Anderssons Orkester with Helen Sjöholm)
- 2006 – BAO på turné (BAO on tour) (Benny Anderssons Orkester with Helen Sjöholm & Tommy Körberg)
- 2007 – BAO 3 (Benny Anderssons Orkester with Helen Sjöholm & Tommy Körberg)
- 2010 – Euforia - Helen Sjöholm sjunger Billy Joel (Euforia - Helen Sjöholm sings Billy Joel)
- 2011 – O klang och jubeltid (Benny Anderssons Orkester with Helen Sjöholm & Tommy Körberg)

=== Selected discography (English) ===
- 2005 – Played Gabriella in film, in "As it is in Heaven"
- 2009 – Story of a Heart (The Benny Andersson Band)
- 2010 – Kristina at Carnegie Hall (live recording of English-language version)
