= Marie Fredriksson discography =

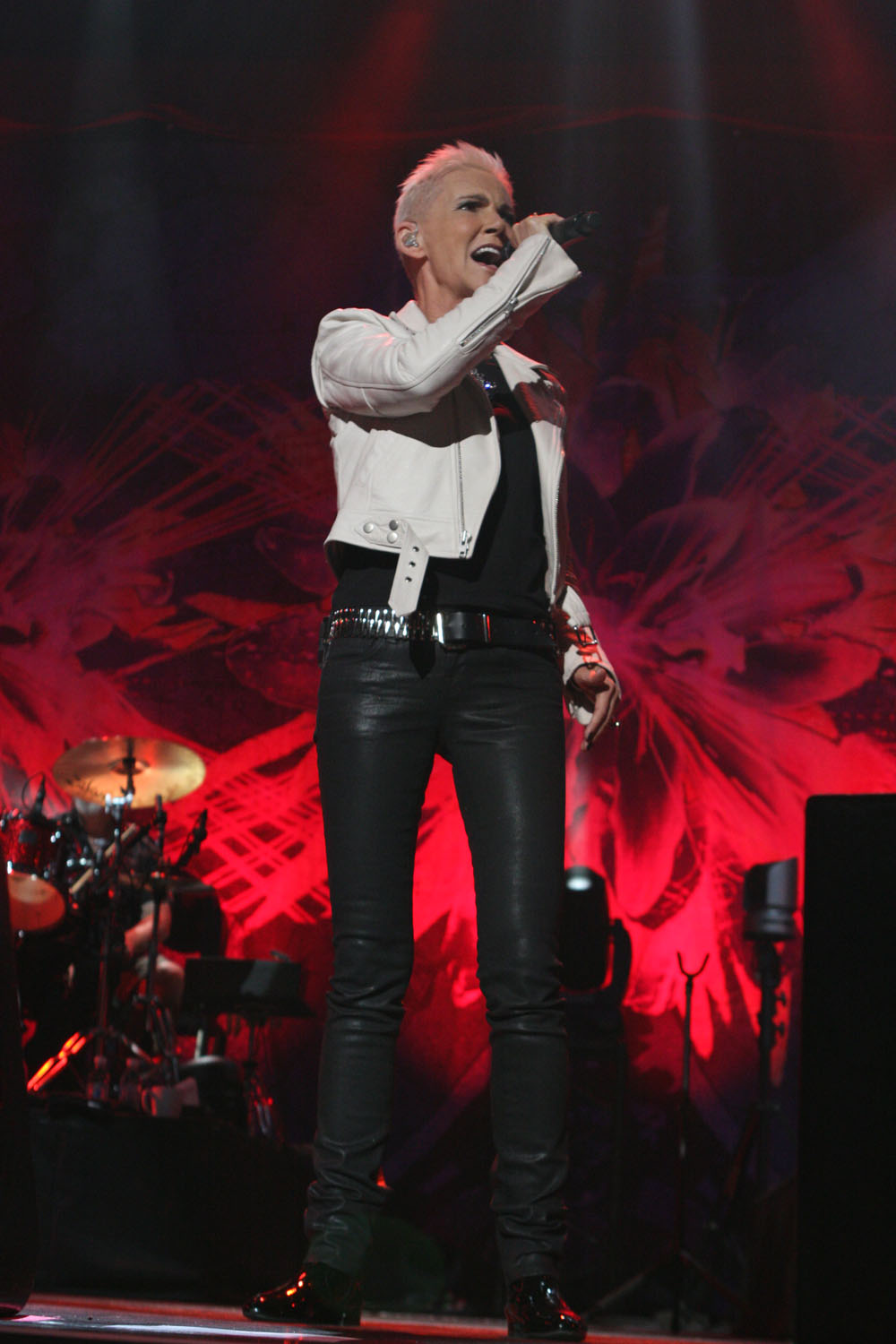
- Fredriksson performing as part of Roxette on 17 February 2012 in Sydney.
- Studio albums: 8
- Live albums: 2
- Compilation albums: 2
- Singles: 39
- Music videos: 16
- Collaborative albums: 2
- Box sets: 2

The discography of Swedish singer Marie Fredriksson consists of eight studio albums, two live albums, two compilations, two collaborative albums, two box sets, thirty-nine singles and fifteen music videos. Fredriksson is predominantly known internationally as the lead singer for pop duo Roxette, although she first found success in her native country through her solo albums. Het vind was released in 1984, spawning the top twenty hit "Ännu doftar kärlek". Her second album, Den sjunde vågen, was released in 1986; the same year Roxette released their debut album, Pearls of Passion. In 1987, ... Efter stormen became the first of her four number one albums in Sweden, and was preceded by the title track—her first top ten hit.

Roxette's international breakthrough – with Look Sharp! (1988) and Joyride (1991) – coincided with a period of solo inactivity for Fredriksson. The non-album single "Sparvöga" was released in 1989, and became both her highest-peaking and highest-selling single to date. Den ständiga resan was released in 1992 and remains her most successful and critically acclaimed solo album. Four music videos were made for the record, all of which were directed by acclaimed Swedish photographer Jonas Åkerlund, who would go on to direct numerous videos for Roxette over the next few years, including ones for 1994's Crash! Boom! Bang! and 1995's greatest hits compilation. She returned to solo work with 1996's I en tid som vår, which produced "Tro"—one of her best-performing solo singles.

Fredriksson returned to Roxette with the release of Have a Nice Day in 1999 and Room Service in 2001. On 11 September 2002, she had an epileptic seizure and collapsed in her bathroom, with the impact of the fall fracturing her cranium. MRI scans later indicated she had a malignant brain tumour in the back of her head, after which she endured several months of chemotherapy and radiation treatment. Her first English-language solo album, The Change, followed in 2004; it consisted mainly of songs written by Fredriksson in the mid-1990s. An album of Swedish covers, Min bäste vän, was released two years later. "Där du andas" was released in 2008, becoming her first and only number one single in Sweden. Roxette reconvened in 2009 for "The Neverending World Tour", and the duo subsequently released several studio albums. Her eighth and final solo album, Nu!, was released in 2013. Fredriksson died on 9 December 2019 due to complications stemming from her 2002 brain tumour diagnosis.

== Studio albums ==
List of studio albums with selected chart positions and certifications
Title	Details	Peak chart positions		Certifications
Title	Details	SWE	NOR	Certifications
Het vind	Released: 20 September 1984; Label: EMI; Formats: Cassette · LP	20	—	
Den sjunde vågen	Released: 17 February 1986; Label: EMI; Formats: Cassette · LP	6	—	GLF: Platinum
... Efter stormen	Released: 12 October 1987; Label: EMI; Formats: Cassette · LP · CD	1	—	GLF: Platinum
Den ständiga resan	Released: 9 October 1992; Label: EMI; Formats: Cassette · CD · LP	1	17	GLF: Platinum
I en tid som vår	Released: 4 November 1996; Label: EMI; Formats: CD	2	—	GLF: Platinum
The Change	Released: 10 October 2004; Label: Mary Jane/Amelia Music · Capitol; Formats: CD · digital download	1	—	GLF: Gold
Min bäste vän	Released: 14 June 2006; Label: Mary Jane/Amelia Music · Capitol; Formats: CD · digital download	3	—	
Nu!	Released: 20 November 2013; Label: Amelia Music · Parlophone; Formats: CD · digital download	6	—	
"—" denotes a release that did not chart or was not released in that territory.

== Live albums ==
List of live albums, with additional information
Title	Details	Peak chart positions	Further information
Title	Details	SWE	Further information
Äntligen Live!	Released: 5 March 2003; Label: Capitol Records; Formats: CD · digital download	—	Separate album re-release of the live CD from the Äntligen – Sommarturné box set; this also appeared as a bonus disc on Kärlekens guld in June 2002.
Live från Cirkus	Released: 6 December 2024; Label: Amelia Music; Formats: CD · digital download	26	

== Compilations ==
List of compilations with selected chart positions and certifications
Title	Details	Peak chart positions			Certifications
Title	Details	SWE	ARG	NOR	Certifications
Äntligen – Marie Fredrikssons bästa 1984–2000	Released: 31 March 2000; Label: EMI; Formats: CD	1	—	6	GLF: 3× Platinum; IFPI NOR: Gold
Tid för tystnad – Marie Fredrikssons ballader	Released: 28 November 2007; Label: Mary Jane/Amelia Music · Capitol Records; Formats: CD · digital download	32	16	—	
"—" denotes a release that did not chart or was not released in that territory.

== Collaborative albums ==
List of collaborative albums with additional information
Title	Details	Peak chart positions	Certifications	Further information
Title	Details	SWE	Certifications	Further information
Den flygande holländaren	Released: 3 November 1988; Label: EMI; Formats: Cassette · LP · CD	2	GLF: 2× Platinum	Tribute album to Cornelis Vreeswijk. Fredriksson performed three songs ("Ann Katrin, Farväl", "Felicia – Adjö" and "Veronica"), and was a featured vocalist on "Somliga går med trasiga skor" by Eldkvarn. She also co-produced and arranged the album's intro and outro, both performed by flautist Björn J:son Lindh.
A Family Affair	Released: 14 June 2007; Label: Mary Jane/MBM · Capitol; Formats: CD · digital download	—		An album by Fredriksson's husband Mikael Bolyos, featuring her vocals on three tracks ("In the Corner of Your Eye", "Tell It to My Heart" and "Hometown").

== Box sets ==
List of box sets, with additional information
Title	Details	Further information
Äntligen – Sommarturné	Released: 24 November 2000; Label: EMI; Format: DVD+CD	Footage of Fredriksson's performance at Stockholm's Maritime Museum on 10 August 2000.; Disc 1: DVD: 1. "Den bästa dagen" 2. "Efter stormen" 3. "Så stilla så långsamt" 4. "Sparvöga"; 5. "Det som var nu"^{[a]}; 6. "Om du såg mej nu" 7. "Mot okända hav"^{[a]}; 8. "Tid för tystnad"^{[a]}; 9. "Ett hus vid havet" 10. "Ännu doftar kärlek" 11. "Bara för en dag" 12. "Så länge det lyser mittemot" 13. "Värdighet"; 14. "Mellan sommar och höst" 15. "Tro"; 16. "Äntligen"; 17. "Den sjunde vågen" 18. "Så skimrande var aldrig havet"
Kärlekens guld	Released: June 2002; Label: EMI; Formats: CD	6-CD box set containing Fredriksson's first 5 studio albums, as well as the live album Äntligen Live!

Note

- ^{^[a]} The second disc of Äntligen – Sommarturné consisted of a CD version of the same concert that appeared on disc one (DVD). Due to differences in the two formats (time constraints), these three songs on the DVD disc were excluded from the CD disc.

== Singles ==
Title	Year	Peak chart positions		Certifications	Album
Title	Year	SWE	SWE Airplay	Certifications	Album
"Ännu doftar kärlek"	1984	18	—		Het vind
"Het vind"	1984	—	—		Het vind
"Den bästa dagen"	1985	—	—		Den sjunde vågen
"Silver i din hand"	1986	—	—		Den sjunde vågen
"Efter stormen"	1987	7	2		... Efter stormen
"Sparvöga"	1989	6	3	GLF: Gold	Non-album single
"Så länge det lyser mittemot"	1992	—	—		Den ständiga resan
"Mellan sommar och höst" (Note: Issued exclusively in Sweden as a limited edition (640 copies) CD single; "Så länge det lyser mittemot" had been released throughout Europe.)	1993	—	10		Den ständiga resan
"Tro"	1996	8	8		I en tid som vår
"I en tid som vår" (Note: Only 700 copies of this CD single were manufactured, which were released in select territories throughout Europe.)	1996	—	—		I en tid som vår
"Ber bara en gång" (Note: Released throughout Europe in limited quantities; only 600 copies of this CD single were manufactured.)	1997	—	—		I en tid som vår
"Äntligen"	2000	34	—		Äntligen – Marie Fredrikssons bästa 1984–2000
"Det som var nu" (with Patrik Isaksson)	2000	59	—		Äntligen – Marie Fredrikssons bästa 1984–2000
"2:nd Chance"	2004	8	8		The Change
"All About You"	2004	—	9		The Change
"A Table in the Sun"	2005	—	—		The Change
"Sommaräng"	2006	21	10		Min bäste vän
"Ingen kommer undan politiken"	2006	—	—		Min bäste vän
"Där du andas"	2008	1	10		Arn – Riket vid vägens slut OST
"Kom vila hos mig"	2013	—	—		Nu!
"Sista sommarens vals"	2013	—	—		Nu!
"Det är nu!"	2013	—	—		Nu!
"Alone Again" (with Magnus Lindgren and Max Schultz)	2017	—	—		Non-album singles
"I Want to Go"	2017	—	—		Non-album singles
"Sing Me a Song"	2018	—	—		Non-album singles
"Sea of Love"	2020	—	—		Non-album singles
"Stay"	2021	—	—		Non-album singles
"Crazy 'Bout You Baby"	2023	—	—		Non-album singles
"—" denotes a release which did not chart.

=== Airplay-only singles ===
Title	Year	Peak chart positions	Album
Title	Year	SWE Airplay	Album
"Den sjunde vågen"	1986	7	Den sjunde vågen
"Mot okända hav"	1986	7	Den sjunde vågen
"Bara för en dag"	1988	7	... Efter stormen
"Felicia – Adjö"	1989	1	Den flygande holländaren
"Så stilla så långsamt"	1992	5	Den ständiga resan
"Det regnar igen"	1993	9	Den ständiga resan
"Ordet är farväl"	2007	—	Tid för tystnad – Marie Fredrikssons ballader
"Ett bord i solen" (Swedish version of "A Table in the Sun")	2008	—	Tid för tystnad – Marie Fredrikssons ballader
"—" denotes a release which did not chart.

=== As featured artist ===
Title	Year	Peak chart positions	Album
Title	Year	SWE	Album
"Violett" (Ute Til Lunch with Marie Fredriksson, Sanne Salomonsen & Sølvguttene)	1988	—	Seier'n er vår
"Änglamark" (as part of Artister för miljö)	1992	—	Non-album single
"Alla mina bästa år" (Frida & Marie Fredriksson)	1997	54	Djupa andetag

== Other songs ==
Fredriksson has collaborated on songs recorded by numerous other artists. In 1992, she was a featured performer on "Änglamark" by Artister för miljö (Artists for the Environment), a project spearheaded by Anni-Frid Lyngstad which also featured Håkan Hagegård and Tomas Ledin. This single was released in limited quantities. She performed lead vocals on two songs on Totta Näslund's 2001 album Totta: Duetterna: "Ett minne bättre glömt" and "Sommarens sista servitris". She also performed lead vocals on "On a Sunday", a song by Magnus Lindgren on his 2013 album Souls.

== Music videos ==
List of music videos, showing year released and directors
Title	Year	Director(s)
"Efter stormen"	1987	Unknown
"Somliga går med trasiga skor" (Eldkvarn feat. Marie Fredriksson)	1988	Unknown
"Sparvöga"	1989	Unknown
"Så länge det lyser mittemot"	1992	Jonas Åkerlund
"Mellan sommar och höst"	1992	Jonas Åkerlund
"Ett enda liv"	1992	Jonas Åkerlund
"Den där novemberdan"	1992	Jonas Åkerlund
"Tro"	1996	Colin Nutley
"Äntligen"	2000	Unknown
"Det som var nu" (with Patrik Isaksson)	2000	Unknown
"Små lätta moln"	2008	Unknown
"Där du andas"	2008	Unknown
"Where Your Love Lives" (English version of "Där du andas")	2008	Unknown
"Sista sommarens vals"	2013	Emil Jonsvik
"Alone Again"	2017	Unknown
"I Want to Go"	2017	Tina Axelsson
