= Tid för tystnad =

Tid för tystnad – Marie Fredrikssons ballader

Compilation album by Marie Fredriksson
- Released: 28 November 2007
- Recorded: 1984–2007
- Genre: Pop
- Length: 77:19
- Language: Swedish
- Label: Mary Jane/Amelia Music; Capitol
- Producer: Lasse Lindbom; Marie Fredriksson; Mikael Bolyos; Anders Herrlin; Per Andersson; Kjell Andersson

Marie Fredriksson chronology
Min bäste vän (2006)	Tid för tystnad – Marie Fredrikssons ballader (2007)	Nu! (2013)

Tid för tystnad – Marie Fredrikssons ballader (Time for Silence – Marie Fredriksson's Ballads) is a compilation album by Swedish singer-songwriter Marie Fredriksson, released on 28 November 2007 by Capitol Records in conjunction with Fredriksson's own independent record label Mary Jane/Amelia Music. It was compiled by Fredriksson alongside her husband Mikael Bolyos and former EMI executive Kjell Andersson, and consists of personal favourites among her previously recorded ballads, along with new songs "Ordet är farväl" and "Ett bord i solen". Both of these tracks were issued as airplay-only promotional singles in Sweden. The latter is a Swedish version of "A Table in the Sun", a song from her 2004 English album The Change.

The compilation received generally positive reviews from Swedish publications, and charted moderately in her home country upon release. In July 2008, Tid för tystnad was released in Argentina, and peaked within the top twenty of the Argentine Albums Chart.

== Development and release ==
The album was compiled by Fredriksson, her husband Mikael Bolyos, and Kjell Andersson, the former EMI executive who proposed in 1985 that Fredriksson collaborate with Per Gessle, with whom she would form Roxette the following year. Tid för tystnad consists of personal favourites among her previously recorded ballads, along with two newly recorded songs: "Ordet är farväl" ("The Word Is Goodbye") and "Ett bord i solen" ("A Table in the Sun"), both of which were issued as airplay-only promotional singles in Sweden. "Ordet är farväl" was released on 18 November 2007; it had been composed several years earlier by Bolyos and Swedish pop singer Py Bäckman, whom Fredriksson described as a "fantastic songwriter". "Ett bord i solen" followed on 7 February 2008; it is a Swedish language version of "A Table in the Sun", a track originally from Fredriksson's 2004 English album The Change.

== Critical reception ==
Professional ratings
Review scores
Source	Rating
Borås Tidning	3/5 stars
Expressen	3/5 stars
Helsingborgs Dagblad	3/5 stars
Nya Wermlands-Tidningen	2/5 stars

The compilation received generally positive reviews from Swedish publications upon release. Karin Bengtsson of Borås Tidning described "Sparvöga" as one of the most beautiful songs of all time, and said that it "still makes me a little teary-eyed, like it did back when it was originally released in the late 80's." Despite this, she called the "middle portion" of the album "a little too quiet, even for a ballad album." Expressen referred to Fredriksson as "Sweden's uncrowned ballad queen, at least in the 80's and 90's where the majority of these songs are from", and described the record as "finely tuned, emotional and beautiful". Helsingborgs Dagblad said: "She has some nice ballads on her conscience, Marie Fredriksson, but not as many as 19. Therefore, this collection becomes an uneven story." Nevertheless, they summarised by writing: "But 'Sparvöga' still soars even now, and it has fitting company in [proceeding track] 'Den sjunde vågen'. [The album is] a beautifully sweet experience, in a way." A writer for Nya Wermlands-Tidningen claimed that several songs on the compilation had lost their appeal due to being overplayed "on all [Swedish] radio station playlists since the day they were released. This provokes an instant psychological response: these songs are either dear old acquaintances or tedious repetitions of something you hoped to forget, at least for a short while. I belong to the latter category, and am filled with a sense of satiety after listening to just a few moments of each song."

== Commercial performance ==
The record performed moderately well in her native country, spending five weeks on the Swedish Albums Chart and peaking at number 32 on its third week of release. Tid för tystnad was released in Argentina in July 2008, making it the first Fredriksson or Gessle solo album ever printed and released in South America, and also the first of Fredriksson's Swedish-language albums to be released outside of Sweden since I en tid som vår was issued in Japan in 1997. It peaked at number 16 on CAPIF's weekly albums chart.

== Track listing ==
All tracks are written by Marie Fredriksson, except where noted.

No.	Title	Writer(s)	English translation	Length
1.	"Ordet är farväl"	Mikael Bolyos; Py Bäckman	"The Word Is Goodbye"	3:55
2.	"Ännu doftar kärlek" (from Het vind, 1984)	Fredriksson; Lasse Lindbom	"Still the Scent of Love"	3:44
3.	"Den bästa dagen" (from Den sjunde vågen, 1986)	Fredriksson; Lindbom; Niklas Strömstedt	"The Best Day"	4:18
4.	"Mot okända hav" (from Den sjunde vågen)	Ulf Schagerström	"Toward Unknown Seas"	3:52
5.	"Aldrig som främlingar" (from Efter stormen, 1987)	Schagerström	"Never Like Strangers"	4:37
6.	"Även vargar måste välja" (from Efter stormen)	Fredriksson; Lindbom	"Even Wolves Must Choose"	2:48
7.	"Jag brände din bild" (from Efter stormen)	Fredriksson; Lindbom	"I Burned Your Picture"	4:22
8.	"Tid för tystnad" (from Den ständiga resan, 1992)		"Time for Silence"	3:55
9.	"Ett bord i solen"		"A Table in the Sun"	3:23
10.	"Den ständiga resan" (from Den ständiga resan)		"The Eternal Journey"	4:04
11.	"Medan tiden är inne" (from Den ständiga resan)		"While There Is Still Time"	3:44
12.	"Min trognaste vän" (from I en tid som vår, 1996)		"My Most Faithful Friend"	4:08
13.	"Vinterängel" (from I en tid som vår)		"Winter Angel"	4:33
14.	"Sparvöga" (non-album single, 1989)		"Sparrow-eye" (or "Hawk-eye")	4:08
15.	"Den sjunde vågen" (from Den sjunde vågen)	Fredriksson; Lindbom	"The Seventh Wave"	6:22
16.	"Ett hus vid havet" (from Den sjunde vågen)	Fredriksson; Lindbom	"A House By the Sea"	1:29
17.	"Så skimrande var aldrig havet" (from Taube, 1990)	Evert Taube	"The Sea Was Never So Sparkling"	3:53
18.	"Berusa mig" (from I en tid som vår)		"Intoxicate Me"	5:08
19.	"Tro" (from I en tid som vår)		"Hope"	4:59

== Credits ==
Credits adapted from the liner notes of Tid för tystnad – Marie Fredrikssons ballader.

- All songs produced by Lars-Göran "Lasse" Lindbom, except tracks 1, 9, 12, 13, 18 and 19 by Marie Fredriksson and Mikael Bolyos; tracks 8, 10 and 11 Fredriksson and Anders Herrlin; track 14 by Fredriksson, Herrlin and Per "Pelle" Andersson, and track 17 by Kjell Andersson.
- Compiled and selected by Fredriksson, Bolyos and Kjell Andersson.
- Mastered by Björn Engelmann at Cutting Room Studios in Stockholm.
- Artwork design by Kjell Andersson and Pär Wickholm.
- Photography by Pär Wickholm.
- Make-up by Lisa Derkert.
- Management: D&D Management.

== Charts ==
Chart (2007–08)	Peak position
Argentine Albums (CAPIF)	16
Swedish Albums (Sverigetopplistan)	32

== Release history ==
Region	Date	Format	Label	Catalog #	Ref.
Sweden	28 November 2007	CD; digital download	Mary Jane/Amelia Music; Capitol Records	50999 516529–2 0	
Argentina	8 July 2008	CD; digital download	Mary Jane/Amelia Music; Capitol Records	50999 516529–2 0	
