= Nu! =

Studio album by Marie Fredriksson
- Released: 20 November 2013
- Studio: Various: Studio Vinden, Djursholm; Polar Studios, Stockholm; Atlantis Studios, Stockholm; The Aerosol Grey Machine, Scania
- Genre: Pop rock
- Length: 40:50
- Language: Swedish
- Label: Amelia Music; Parlophone
- Producer: Marie Fredriksson; Mikael Bolyos; Christoffer Lundquist

Marie Fredriksson chronology
Tid för tystnad (2007)	Nu! (2013)

Singles from Nu!
- 1. "Kom vila hos mig" Released: 26 September 2013; 2. "Sista sommarens vals" Released: 9 December 2013; 3. "Det är nu" Released: 8 April 2014

Nu! (English: Now!) is the eighth and final studio album by Swedish singer-songwriter Marie Fredriksson, released on 20 November 2013 by Parlophone in conjunction with Fredriksson's own label Amelia Music. It was her first album of original Swedish material since 1996's I en tid som var, and was produced by Fredriksson alongside her husband Mikael Bolyos and Christoffer Lundquist. The record contains writing contributions from Uno Svenningsson, Kenneth Gärdestad, Lustans Lakejer vocalist Johan Kinde, and Fredriksson's Roxette partner Per Gessle.

The album received generally positive reviews from the Swedish music press, with several publications commending Fredriksson's vocals as well as the quality of the songwriting and production. It was also a commercial success, peaking at number six on the Swedish Albums Chart; it ended 2013 as one of the biggest-selling albums of the year in the country. The record was supported by a nineteen-date tour of Sweden, Fredriksson's first solo concerts since 2000.

== Background and recording ==
Nu! is Fredriksson's first studio album of original Swedish material since 1996's I en tid som var, and her first since she was diagnosed with a malignant brain tumour in 2002, for which she received months of chemotherapy and radiation treatment. The album was co-produced by Fredriksson alongside her husband Mikael Bolyos, as well as frequent Roxette co-producer Christoffer Lundquist. Bolyos composed the music to all but two songs on the record: "Sista sommarens vals", Fredriksson's sole writing contribution to the album, and "Känn dig som hemma", which was written by Roxette songwriter and guitarist Per Gessle. Fredriksson explained that "[Mikael and I] have been writing this album for six years. Unfortunately, it's just one song that I have written. I wish I had written more, but it takes so long for me nowadays because of my illness. When [he] wrote 'Kom vila hos mig', suddenly I thought 'Finally, a little island!'. So it felt natural to begin the album with it."

Bolyos collaborated with several lyricists to compose the majority of the remaining songs on the album, including Uno Svenningsson, Kenneth Gärdestad and Lustans Lakejer vocalist Johan Kinde. The record also contains three songs co-written with Ulf Schagerström: "Det är nu", "Aldrig längre bort än nära" and "I morgon". Schagerström had previously collaborated with Fredriksson, composing "Mot okända hav" from 1985's Den sjunde vågen and "Aldrig som främlingar" from 1987's Efter stormen. The fourth track on the album, "Längtan", was written solely by Bolyos, and is unrelated to the same-titled song which previously appeared on Efter stormen.

== Release and promotion ==
Three singles were released in Sweden to promote the album. "Kom vila hos mig" was issued as the lead single on 26 September 2013, followed by the one-track digital download singles "Sista sommarens vals" and "Det är nu" on 9 December and 8 April 2014, respectively. Nu! was also promoted by a nineteen-date concert tour of Sweden, which began on 19 February 2014 in Helsingborg and concluded on 19 April in Umeå. These were her first solo concerts since the Äntligen – Sommarturné, in support of her 2000 greatest hits compilation Äntligen – Marie Fredrikssons bästa 1984–2000.

== Critical reception ==
Professional ratings
Review scores
Source	Rating
Dagens Nyheter	4/5 stars
DI Weekend	3/5 stars
Expressen	B
Göteborgs-Posten	2/5 stars
Helsingborgs Dagblad	3/5 stars
Nerikes Allehanda	4/5 stars
Östgöta Correspondenten	3/5 stars
Smålandsposten	3/5 stars
Svenska Dagbladet	4/5 stars
Upsala Nya Tidning	3/5 stars

The album received generally positive reviews from the Swedish music press. Nerikes Allehanda described it as her best solo album to date, and praised both "Kom vila hos mig" and "Bara 3 ord" as album highlights. The writer summarised: "On the whole, Nu! is a great surprise, which actually exceeds most of what she has done before—Den ständiga resan (1992) included. ... And of course we have [Fredriksson's] voice, as nice as ever." Svenska Dagbladet described it as "occasionally shimmering like classic pop should be", while one of the country's largest publications, Dagens Nyheter, said that Fredriksson's "Sista sommarens vals" and Gessle's "Känn dig som hemma" were the best songs on the album, and also commended Bolyos' production, saying: "He is there as a reliable support for Marie, without ever once attempting to steal the spotlight for himself."

Upsala Nya Tidning praised Fredriksson's vocals, as did DI Weekend, which said: "Nobody sings the blues like Marie Fredriksson." Helsingborgs Dagblad commended the album for its inclusion of country influences, and said that Fredriksson herself was "by far the best thing on the album: a star that is still burning bright." Värmlands Folkblad commended the quality of the songwriting, but complained about the lack of musical variety on the album as a whole, elaborating: "It's all very nice, beautiful and rewarding. But because there are so many songs on Nu! that can be called beautiful and nice, in the end it all becomes a bit of a monotony. ... This is nevertheless a return that feels honest and genuine. Few are the Swedish artists who possess the same incredible feeling and humility for the music and their own songs like Marie Fredriksson. There is weight behind every word and every tone." Conversely, Arbetarbladet rated the album two out of five and said: "Because there is too much variation [musically], the end result is a little confused."

The record also received some mixed reviews. Östgöta Correspondenten complained that it contained too many ballads, and was critical that Fredriksson composed only one song. A writer for Smålandsposten echoed this sentiment: "I do not know if Marie Fredriksson had the capability of contributing more, but I would love to believe that she could have." They also criticised the material for a lack of memorable hooks. A writer for Nya Wermlands-Tidningen rated the album two out of five, and said it was too similar to Fredriksson's work with Roxette. Jan Andersson of the Göteborgs-Posten praised Fredriksson's voice, saying that it had "avoided the major problems that such intense cancer treatment can expose to a body. If anything, her voice is even darker, and deeper, and comparing it now to how it sounded in the 1980s makes you realise how [high-pitched and] silly she sounded back then. The attitude is still there. The feeling, likewise." However, he went on to call the album a "disappointment."

== Commercial performance ==
Nu! debuted at number six on the Swedish Albums Chart, on a busy chart week also marked by new releases from One Direction (Midnight Memories) and Robbie Williams (Swings Both Ways), along with recent releases from popular Swedish acts Avicii (True) and Veronica Maggio (Handen i fickan fast jag bryr mig), as well as international act Eminem (The Marshall Mathers LP 2). It dropped to number ten on its second week before falling to number 18 on week three, and then spending two consecutive weeks at number 15. In all, it spent eight non-consecutive weeks on the Swedish Albums Chart, and was the 69th best-selling album of 2013 in the country.

== Track listing ==
All music is composed by Mikael Bolyos, except track 5 by Marie Fredriksson and track 8 by Per Gessle

No.	Title	Lyrics	English translation	Length
1.	"Kom vila hos mig"	Bolyos	"Come Rest with Me"	3:17
2.	"Det bästa som nånsin kan hända"	Uno Svenningsson	"The Best Thing That Ever Can Happen"	3:10
3.	"Det är nu"	Ulf Schagerström	"It Is Now"	3:51
4.	"Längtan"	Bolyos	"Longing"	3:04
5.	"Sista sommarens vals"	Fredriksson	"Last Summer's Waltz"	4:04
6.	"Aldrig längre bort än nära"	Schagerström	"Never Farther Away Than Near"	2:46
7.	"Bara 3 ord"	Kenneth Gärdestad	"Just 3 Words"	3:34
8.	"Känn dig som hemma"	Gessle	"Make Yourself at Home"	4:17
9.	"Jag undrar vad du tänker på"	Bolyos	"I Wonder What You're Thinking About"	2:53
10.	"Stjärna som brinner"	Johan Kinde	"Star That Burns"	3:42
11.	"I morgon"	Schagerström	"Tomorrow"	3:31
12.	"Vad vore jag utan dig"	Bolyos	"What Would I Be Without You?"	2:41
Total length:				40:50

== Credits and personnel ==
Credits adapted from the liner notes of Nu!.

- Recorded at Studio Vinden in Djursholm; Polar Studios and Atlantis Studio in Stockholm; The Aerosol Grey Machine in Vallarum, Scania, Sweden.
- Mastered by Björn Engelmann at Cutting Room Studios in Stockholm.

Musicians

- Marie Fredriksson – lead and background vocals
- Mikael Bolyos – background vocals, piano, keyboards, Wurlitzer electric piano, organ
- Christoffer Lundquist – background vocals, guitars, lap steel guitar, bass guitar, contrabass, mandolin and percussion; all instruments and musical arrangement (track 10 only)
- Jens Jansson – drums

Additional musicians

- Per "Pelle" Alsing – drums and percussion (tracks 1 and 3)
- Staffan Astner – guitar (track 1)
- Torbjörn Bernhardsson – string leader (track 4)
- Emil Carlsson – violin (track 3, 5 and 7)
- Tomas Ebrelius – violin (track 3, 5 and 7)
- Ola Gustafsson – guitar (tracks 2, 4 and 7); pedal steel guitar (track 2)
- Henrik Janson – string arrangements (track 4)
- Ulf Janson – string arrangements (track 4)
- Conny Lindgren – string leader (track 6)
- Magnus Lindgren – string arrangements (track 6)
- Jokke Pettersson – guitar (track 11)
- Jessica Strid – viola (track 3, 5 and 7)
- Stockholm Chamber Strings – strings (track 6)
- Stockholm Session Strings – string section (track 4)
- Charlotta Weber Widerström – cello (track 3, 5 and 7)

== Charts ==
=== Weekly charts ===
Chart (2013)	Peak position
Swedish Albums (Sverigetopplistan)	6

=== Year-end charts ===
Chart (2013)	Position
Swedish Albums (Sverigetopplistan)	69
