= The Change (album) =

Studio album by Marie Fredriksson
- Released: 20 October 2004
- Recorded: 2002–2004
- Genre: Pop rock; blues rock
- Length: 49:30
- Label: Mary Jane/Amelia Music; Capitol
- Producer: Mikael Bolyos

Marie Fredriksson chronology
Äntligen (2000)	The Change (2004)	Min bäste vän (2006)

Singles from The Change
- 1. "2:nd Chance" Released: 10 October 2004; 2. "All About You" Released: 1 December 2004; 3. "A Table in the Sun" Released: 18 May 2005

The Change is the sixth studio album by Swedish singer-songwriter Marie Fredriksson. It was released on 10 October 2004 by Capitol Records in conjunction with Fredriksson's own independent record label, Mary Jane/Amelia Music. It is her only English-language solo album, and was her first release after being diagnosed with a malignant brain tumour in 2002. Following the diagnosis and treatment, Fredriksson and her husband Mikael Bolyos began work on the album as a form of therapy in their home studio in Djursholm, Stockholm, with Bolyos acting as producer.

Musically, the record is inspired and influenced by roots, rhythm and blues and gospel music the vocalist listened to as a child. Fredriksson also created the album's cover art; she later held several professional art exhibitions for her work. The Change was not promoted by Fredriksson, who withdrew from all forms of public activity for several years after her diagnosis. Despite this, it was her first solo album to be issued globally. Most editions of the record were released with the Copy Control protection system. The album was a commercial success in her home country, debuting at number one and being certified gold for shipments of over 30,000 units. "2:nd Chance", "All About You" and "A Table in the Sun" were released as singles.

== Background and recording ==
The Change is the first and last English language solo album by Roxette vocalist Marie Fredriksson; she had previously released five Swedish solo albums between 1984 and 1996, and seven albums as part of pop duo Roxette between 1986 and 2001. Plans for her debut English solo album had been underway since the mid-1990s. "Bad Moon" is the oldest song on the record; it dates back to 1996, and was first recorded during early sessions for Roxette's sixth studio album Have a Nice Day, which was released in 1999. On 11 September 2002, Fredriksson had an epileptic seizure and collapsed in her bathroom, with the impact of the fall fracturing her skull. After waiting several weeks for the fracture and resulting concussion to subside, she underwent surgery to remove a malignant brain tumour, and endured several months of chemotherapy and radiation treatment. Lasting effects of the illness include her being unable to read or write, as well as blindness in her right eye. She was also unable to speak for a considerable period of time.

Following the diagnosis and treatment, Fredriksson and her husband Mikael Bolyos began work on the album as a form of therapy in their home studio in Djursholm, Stockholm, with Bolyos acting as producer. She said they recorded at home because "It was not stressful there, there was no pressure. We could work at our own pace, and experiment a lot with the music, investigate all the possibilities of how [the songs] could sound. Above all, we had fun together. Micke is very good and inventive as a producer." Lyrics for The Change were written in English as Fredriksson "wanted to share my feelings with my fans all over the world, whose support helped a lot during my illness and gave me a lot of strength. Although there were times when I thought I would not find the strength to complete the album, but step by step, I did it."

Musically, the album is both inspired and influenced by the roots, rhythm and blues and gospel music Fredriksson listened to as a child. Several songs on the record were composed by Bolyos while he was a member of Sugarcane; Fredriksson regularly joined that band on-stage – performing "All You've Gotta Do Is Feel", "Love 2 Live" and "Many Times", as well as numerous other original compositions and cover versions – during the band's concerts in Halmstad nightclub Penny Lane throughout the late '90s and early 2000s. Also included on The Change is a cover of "The Good Life", a jazz standard originally made famous by Tony Bennett.

== Artwork ==
The album's cover art was created by Fredriksson, who began drawing with charcoal in her dining room as another form of therapy following her brain tumour diagnosis. She said, she opted to use charcoal because "that technology is both simple and interesting. I have always been fascinated by contrasts, of the black and white, and of the grayscale, which is where I find the emotions of each piece originate." She found herself creating more artwork as recording of the album progressed, elaborating: "It was as if the music attracted the drawings as company, that it was a symbiotic relationship—one could not exist without the other." She held her first professional art exhibition – titled "After the Change" – in September 2005 at Galleri doktor Glas in Stockholm. The exhibition was a success, with every painting displayed being sold by the end of the second day. Further exhibitions were held in 2008 in both Stockholm and Gothenburg.

== Release and promotion ==
Fredriksson withdrew from all forms of publicity for several years after her diagnosis, and did not promote The Change. Lead single "2:nd Chance" was released on 8 October 2004, backed with "All You've Gotta Do Is Feel". The track peaked at number eight on the Swedish Singles Chart, becoming Fredriksson's first top ten hit in her home country since "Tro" peaked at the same position in 1996. The song was also successful internationally, entering the top ten of several German airplay-based charts. The album was first released in limited quantities in a jewelcase CD format in Sweden on 20 October 2004. A wider Swedish, Scandinavian and mainland European release took place on 27 October. These editions were issued in digipak formatting, and used the Copy Control protection system. It was her first solo album to receive a global release; Capitol Records confirmed it would be issued "in all of the principle markets which released Roxette's last album", including Europe, South America, South Africa and parts of Asia.

The album spent two weeks atop the Swedish Albums Chart before dropping outside the top ten. The record then re-entered the top ten for a further three weeks on broadcast of a Swedish-language television documentary on TV4 on 24 November. The Change ended 2004 as the 18th best-selling album of the year in Sweden, and was certified gold by the Swedish Recording Industry Association for shipments in excess of 30,000 units. An alternate version of "April Snow" was issued as a b-side to the album's second single, "All About You", which was released on 1 December. "A Table in the Sun", backed with the album version of the title track, was issued as the final single on 18 May 2005. A Swedish version of "A Table in the Sun" – "Ett bord i solen" – later appeared on Fredriksson's 2008 ballads compilation Tid för tystnad.

== Critical reception ==
Professional ratings
Review scores
Source	Rating
Aftonbladet	4/5 stars
Expressen	1/5 stars
Gaffa	2/5 stars
Göteborgs-Posten	3/5 stars
Hallandsposten	4/5 stars
Nerikes Allehanda	3/5 stars
Helsingborgs Dagblad	4/5 stars

The album received generally positive reviews upon release. Aftonbladet called the record "extremely strong" and commended the quality of the lyrics, describing them as "private, to the extent that you can sometimes not listen without holding your breath. But of course, that's what makes the songs so special. Marie Fredriksson's comeback is a great triumph—in every way possible." "Mother" was selected as an album highlight, which they said was "loaded with almost as much nude feeling as the Lennon song of the same name." Göteborgs-Posten said that "Virtually every songwriter – more or less – is inspired by their own life when they compose a song. It is also a well-established truth that human creativity peaks when an individual is in crisis. ... Marie's songs have never been this revelatory." They concluded by describing The Change as a "very brave album: a letter signed by Fredriksson/Bolyos which has only one message—love conquers all." Helsingborgs Dagblad complimented the lyrics as well, although their writer argued that – from a Swedish perspective – the use of the English language "acts like a filter, for good and bad, preventing the songs from becoming too emotional." They also highlighted "Mother", calling it "magnificent"; Fredriksson's vocals were additionally praised as "the album's strongest instrument".

Hallandsposten praised the heavier songs on the record, comparing several of them to the work of the Beatles ("April Snow"), Marvin Gaye ("Love 2 Live") and Lenny Kravitz ("Bad Moon"), and said that these were songs which "grow with each listen and point an intriguing way forward. It will be exciting to see what Marie does in the future." Håkan Pettersson of Nerikes Allehanda also complimented the rockier songs, and said they were "so much more powerful than I dared to believe. ... Riffs and overall intensity are given greater prominence, often at the expense of melody and harmony, so The Change is no safe commercial product. At times, it has more in common with the Hives than with any of Marie's Swedish material." Conversely, Expressen was negative, saying: "After all that happened to Marie personally, this CD is of course an exciting and positive music event. For once, the question is 'how does Marie sound?' and not 'how is she?'. The answer is unfortunately 'not very good'. Her first studio album of eight years does not meet expectations." They were critical of the heavier production, lamenting the loss of the "light, melodious (and unique) pop feeling" found on her Swedish work. Similarly, Danish music magazine Gaffa called The Change the "most important album in her career, but definitely nowhere near to being her best."

== Track listing ==
All tracks are written by Marie Fredriksson, except where noted.

No.	Title	Writer(s)	Length
1.	"The Change"		4:08
2.	"2:nd Chance"		3:24
3.	"All You've Gotta Do Is Feel"	Mikael Bolyos	4:05
4.	"April Snow"		4:36
5.	"Love 2 Live"	Bolyos; Gary T'to	2:55
6.	"Mother"	Bolyos	5:11
7.	"Many Times"	Bolyos	3:56
8.	"All About You"	Bolyos	3:32
9.	"The Good Life (La belle vie)"	Sacha Distel; Jack Reardon; Jean Broussolle	3:59
10.	"Bad Moon"		4:56
11.	"A Table in the Sun"		4:08
12.	"The Change – Orchestra"		4:39
Total length:			49:30

== Credits and personnel ==
Credits adapted from the liner notes of The Change.

- All tracks recorded at Studio Vinden in Djursholm; Cosmos Studios and Polar Studios in Stockholm.
- All songs produced by Mikael Bolyos.
- Mastered by Claes Persson at CRP Recording in Stockholm.

Musicians

- Marie Fredriksson – lead and background vocals, cover artwork and inlay illustration
- Mikael Bolyos – background vocals, keyboards, organ, Wurlitzer electric piano, glockenspiel, maracas, tambourine and engineering; string arrangements (tracks 2, 6 and 8)
- Staffan Astner – acoustic, electric and bass guitars
- Magnus Lindgren – string arrangements (tracks 2, 6, 8 and 12) and conducting (track 12); saxophone (track 5); flute and clarinet (track 6)
- Nicci Notini – drums; tambourine (track 3); timpani (track 12)

Additional musicians and technical personnel

- Kjell Andersson – sleeve design
- Jocke Bergström – background vocals (tracks 5 and 8)
- Peter Forss – bass guitar (tracks 1, 2 and 8)
- Peter Gardemar – string conductor (track 9)
- Grace Gospel Choir – choir (track 4)
- Annika Granlund – background vocals (track 6)
- Karin Hammar – trombone (track 8)
- Anders Herrlin – bass guitar (track 10)
- Sara Isaksson – background vocals (track 6)
- Christoffer Lundquist – bass guitar (tracks 4, 7 and 9)
- Martin Sandberg – background vocals (track 2)
- Marty Manning – string arrangement (track 9)
- Sebastian Notini – percussion (track 8); drums (track 11)
- Lennart Östlund – engineering and mixing
- Mats "M.P." Persson – drums (track 10)
- Anna Rodell – violin (track 8)
- Mats Ronander – harmonica (track 3)
- Max Schultz – guitar (track 8)
- Stockholm Session Strings – string section (tracks 2, 6 and 12)
- Maria Streijffert – violin (track 8)
- Anna Weibust – viola (track 8)
- Pär Wickholm – sleeve design
- Christina Wirdegren-Alin – cello (track 8)

== Charts ==
=== Weekly charts ===
Chart (2004)	Peak position
Swedish Albums (Sverigetopplistan)	1

=== Year-end charts ===
Chart (2004)	Position
Swedish Albums (Sverigetopplistan)	18

== Certifications ==
Region	Certification	Certified units/sales
Sweden (GLF)	Gold	30,000^{^}
^{^} Shipments figures based on certification alone.

== Release history ==
Region	Date	Format	Label	Catalog #	Ref.
Sweden	20 October 2004	CD; DL	Mary Jane/Amelia Music; Capitol Records	7243 863180–2 2	
Sweden	27 October 2004	CD digipack (with copy control); DL	Mary Jane/Amelia Music; Capitol Records	7243 863675–2 5	
Europe	27 October 2004	CD digipack (with copy control); DL	Mary Jane/Amelia Music; Capitol Records	7243 863181–2 1	
South Africa	19 November 2004	CD; DL	Mary Jane/Amelia Music; Capitol Records	CDEMCJ (WFL) 6183	
Brazil	20 December 2004	CD digipack (with copy control); DL	Mary Jane/Amelia Music; Capitol Records	7243 863181–2 1	
Taiwan	23 December 2004	CD digipack (with copy control); DL	Mary Jane/Amelia Music; Capitol Records	7243 863181–2 1	
Japan	13 January 2005	CD digipack (with copy control); DL	Mary Jane/Amelia Music; Toshiba EMI	TOCP–66352	
