= Äntligen – Marie Fredrikssons bästa 1984–2000 =

Greatest hits album by Marie Fredriksson
- Released: 31 March 2000
- Recorded: March 1984 – February 2000
- Genre: Pop rock; alternative rock
- Length: 76:35
- Language: Swedish
- Label: EMI
- Producer: Lasse Lindbom; Anders Herrlin; Marie Fredriksson; Mikael Bolyos; Per Andersson

Marie Fredriksson chronology
I en tid som vår (1996)	Äntligen – Marie Fredrikssons bästa 1984–2000 (2000)	The Change (2004)

Singles from Äntligen
- 1. "Äntligen" Released: 20 March 2000; 2. "Det som var nu" Released: 31 July 2000

Äntligen – Marie Fredrikssons bästa 1984–2000 (Finally – Marie Fredriksson's Best) is the first greatest hits compilation album by Swedish singer-songwriter Marie Fredriksson, released on 31 March 2000 by EMI. It was compiled by Fredriksson, and contains the majority of her singles, as well as several of her favourite album tracks. It was a commercial success upon release in her native country, spending eight weeks at number 1 on the Sverigetopplistan chart, and eventually being certified triple platinum by the Swedish Recording Industry Association for shipments of almost a quarter of a million units.

== Background and recording ==
The album contains every single released by Fredriksson since her 1984 debut album, Het vind, with the exception of three: Het vind's title track, "Silver i din hand" from 1985's Den sjunde vågen, and the limited edition single "Ber bara en gång" from 1996's I en tid som vår. Also excluded is her collaboration with former ABBA vocalist Anni-Frid Lyngstad, "Alla mina bästa år", which was taken from Frida's album Djupa andetag (1996) and released as a single in 1997.

The record contains two previously unreleased recordings, both of which were released as singles. "Äntligen" was issued as the lead single, and became a top forty hit in Sweden. A remixed version of the song, re-titled "Solen gick ner över stan", was also included on the album. The remaining song, "Det som var nu" – a duet with singer-songwriter Patrik Isaksson – was released in Sweden as the second single, where it peaked at number 59. The latter is a Swedish re-recording of a track originally demoed in the late 1990s for Roxette's 1999 album Have a Nice Day. The original English demo of the track, titled "Always the Last to Know", subsequently leaked onto the internet in 2002 when a former member of EMI staff sold a bootleg CD at a Dutch record fair.

== Commercial performance ==
The record was a major commercial success in Fredriksson's native country, debuting at number one and spending a total of eight non-consecutive weeks at the top spot. It went on to spend over a year on the album chart there. It was the second best-selling album of 2000 in the country, behind 1, a greatest hits compilation by The Beatles, and was also the 87th best-selling album of 2001. The album was eventually certified triple platinum by the Swedish Recording Industry Association for shipments of almost 250,000 units. It was also a success in neighbouring Norway, peaking at number six, and was certified gold by the International Federation of the Phonographic Industry for shipments of over 25,000 units in Norway.

The success of the album led Fredriksson to perform a series of 18 concerts throughout Sweden, her first solo concerts since 1992. Äntligen – Sommarturné, a two-disc box set containing a live album and a DVD of her 10 August 2000 performance at Stockholm's Maritime Museum, was released on 24 November.

== Track listing ==
No.	Title	Writer(s)	English translation	Length
1.	"Äntligen"	Marie Fredriksson; Mikael Bolyos	"Finally"	4:02
2.	"Det som var nu" (with Patrik Isaksson)	Fredriksson	"That What Was Now"	6:37
3.	"Ännu doftar kärlek" (from Het vind, 1984)	Fredriksson; Lasse Lindbom	"Still the Scent of Love"	3:43
4.	"Den bästa dagen" (from Den sjunde vågen, 1986)	Fredriksson; Lindbom; Niklas Strömstedt	"The Best Day"	4:34
5.	"Mot okända hav" (from Den sjunde vågen)	Ulf Schagerström	"Toward Unknown Seas"	3:49
6.	"Den sjunde vågen" (from Den sjunde vågen)	Fredriksson; Lindbom	"The Seventh Wave"	5:56
7.	"Ett hus vid havet" (from Den sjunde vågen)	Fredriksson; Lindbom	"A House By the Sea"	1:29
8.	"Efter stormen" (from Efter stormen, 1987)	Fredriksson; Lindbom	"After the Storm"	4:00
9.	"Om du såg mej nu" (from Efter stormen)	Fredriksson; Lindbom	"If You Saw Me Now"	4:01
10.	"Bara för en dag" (from Efter stormen)	Fredriksson; Lindbom	"Just for a Day"	4:42
11.	"Sparvöga" (non-album single, 1989)	Fredriksson	"Sparrow-eye" (or "Hawk-eye")	4:07
12.	"Så stilla så långsamt" (from Den ständiga resan, 1992)	Fredriksson	"So Still, So Slow"	5:40
13.	"Så länge det lyser mittemot" (from Den ständiga resan)	Fredriksson	"As Long as There Is Light on the Other Side"	5:10
14.	"Mellan sommar och höst" (from Den ständiga resan)	Fredriksson	"Between Summer and Autumn"	4:17
15.	"I en tid som vår" (from I en tid som vår, 1996)	Fredriksson	"In a Time Like Ours"	5:51
16.	"Tro" (from I en tid som vår)	Fredriksson	"Hope"	4:56
17.	"Solen gick ner över stan" (Äntligen/Klubbmix)	Fredriksson; Bolyos	"The Sun Went Down over the City"	3:33
Total length:				76:35

== Credits and personnel ==
Credits adapted from the liner notes of Äntligen – Marie Fredrikssons bästa 1984–2000.

- Recorded at EMI Studios in Stockholm and Studio Vinden in Djursholm, Sweden between March 1984 and February 2000.
- All songs produced by Lars-Göran "Lasse" Lindbom, except tracks 1, 2, 15, 16 and 17 produced by Marie Fredriksson and Mikael Bolyos; track 11 produced by Fredriksson, Anders Herrlin and Per "Pelle" Andersson; tracks 12, 13 and 14 produced by Fredriksson and Herrlin.
- Mastered by Åsa Winzell at Polar Mastering in Stockholm.

Musicians

- Marie Fredriksson – lead and background vocals, piano, keyboards, synthesizer, church organ, musical arrangements, mixing
- Per "Pelle" Andersson – drums, keyboards, synthesizer, programming
- Staffan Astner – electric guitars
- Mikael Bolyos – background vocals, keyboards, musical arrangements, programming, engineering, mixing
- Anders Herrlin – bass guitar, keyboards, programming, musical arrangements, engineering, mixing
- Richard "Ricky" Johansson – bass guitar, electric upright bass
- Leif Larson – piano, keyboards, synthesizer
- Lars-Göran "Lasse" Lindbom – acoustic guitar, engineering, mixing

Technical personnel

- Kjell Andersson – sleeve design
- Björn Boström – engineering (tracks 3–7)
- Lisa Derkert – hair and make-up
- Mattias Edwall – photography
- Roger Krieg – mixing (track 1)
- Lisa Lindqwister – stylist
- Alar Suurna – engineering and mixing
- Pär Wickholm – sleeve design

Additional musicians

- Micke "Syd" Andersson – hi-hat (track 11)
- Ove Andersson – bass (tracks 1 and 17)
- "Backa" Hans Eriksson – bass (track 3)
- Marianne Flynner – backing vocals (track 4)
- Anders Garstedt – trumpet and flugelhorn (track 1)
- Karin Hammar – trombone (track 1)
- Jonas Isacsson – electric guitar (tracks 12–14)
- Patrik Isaksson – lead and background vocals, sangbe drum (track 2)
- Christer Jansson – drums and percussion (tracks 1 and 17)
- Mats Kiesel – musical arrangement and choir conductor (track 16)
- Jan "Nane" Kvillsäter – guitars (tracks 3 and 6)
- Magnus Lindgren – musical arrangements, tenor and baritone saxophones (track 1)
- Per Malmstedt – synthesizer (track 8)
- Nacka Musikklasser (Nacka Music Classes) – choir (track 16)
- Nacka Musikskolas (Nacka Music School) – choir (track 16)
- Tove Naess – backing vocals (tracks 4, 8 and 10)
- Tommy Nilsson – backing vocals (track 4)
- Hans "Hasse" Olsson – piano and synthesizer (track 3)
- Mikael Rickfors – backing vocals (track 4)
- Ki Rydberg – backing vocals (tracks 8 and 10)
- Max Schultz – guitar (track 15)
- Torbjörn Stener – guitar (track 11)
- Mattias Torell – electric and acoustic guitars (tracks 1, 2 and 17)
- Nicki Wallin – drums (tracks 12–14, 16)
- Basse Wickman – backing vocals (track 4)

== Charts ==
=== Weekly charts ===
Chart (2000)	Peak; position
Norwegian Albums (VG-lista)	6
Swedish Albums (Sverigetopplistan)	1

=== Year-end charts ===
Chart (2000)	Position
Swedish Albums (Sverigetopplistan)	2
Chart (2001)	Position
Swedish Albums (Sverigetopplistan)	87

== Certifications ==
Region	Certification	Certified units/sales
Norway (IFPI Norway)	Gold	25,000^{*}
Sweden (GLF)	3× Platinum	250,000
^{*} Sales figures based on certification alone.

== Release history ==
Region	Date	Format	Label	Catalog #	Ref.
Scandinavia	31 March 2000	CD	EMI	7243 5 25954-2 6	
