= Där du andas =

Single by Marie Fredriksson

from the album Alla himlens änglar
- Released: 20 August 2008
- Recorded: Stockholm, Sweden
- Studio: Cosmos Studios
- Genre: Pop; Celtic
- Length: 3:56
- Label: Bonnier Amigo Music Group
- Songwriter(s): Anders Glenmark; Niklas Strömstedt
- Producer(s): Glenmark

Marie Fredriksson singles chronology
"Ingen kommer undan politiken" (2006)	"Där du andas" (2008)	"Kom vila hos mig" (2013)

"Där du andas" (English: "Where You Breathe") is a pop ballad recorded by Swedish singer-songwriter Marie Fredriksson, known internationally as the lead vocalist of pop music duo Roxette. The song appeared as the theme music to the Swedish epic film Arn – The Kingdom at Road's End, and released as a single by Bonnier Amigo Music Group on 20 August 2008. It appeared on the film's corresponding soundtrack album, Alla himlens änglar – Musik inspirerad av succéfilmen Arn (English: All Heaven's Angels – Music Inspired by the Successful Film Arn).

The track was written by composer Anders Glenmark and lyricist Niklas Strömstedt, who said its lyrics were inspired by the plot of Arn - Riket vid vägens slut, the second part of a trilogy of novels written by Jan Guillou. Fredriksson had previously worked with both Glenmark and Strömstedt: the former co-wrote and produced Roxette's 1987 non-album single "I Want You", as well as "Alla mina bästa år" (English: "All My Best Years"), her 1996 duet with former ABBA vocalist Anni-Frid Lyngstad, from Frida's album Djupa andetag (English: Deep Breaths), while the latter co-wrote two songs on her 1986 album Den sjunde vågen (English: The Seventh Wave).

Fredriksson said that she "instantly loved the song when Anders and Niklas played it to me for the first time, so it was an easy choice to agree when they asked if I wanted to record it. And, of course, it's incredibly fun to be involved in a big Swedish movie in this way." The track debuted atop the Swedish Singles Chart, becoming her first solo number one single in her native country. She also sang an English language version of the song, titled "Where Your Love Lives", which appeared as a bonus extra on DVD and Blu-ray editions of Arn: The Knight Templar – The Complete Series.

== Track listing ==
- CD single (Bonnier Amigo 7332 3 342469–1 9)
1. "Där du andas" (Radio Version) – 3:56

== Credits and personnel ==
Credits adapted from the liner notes of the CD single.

Musicians

- André Ferrari – timpani and percussion
- Marie Fredriksson – lead vocals
- Anders Glenmark – composition, arrangement, bass guitar, keyboards and production
- Esbjörn Hazelius – flute and violin
- Niklas Strömstedt – lyricist
- Stockholm Session Strings – string section

Technical personnel

- Henke Jonsson – mastering
- Mårten Eriksson – mixing
- Mattias Edwall – photography

== Charts ==
Chart (2008)	Peak position
Sweden (Sverigetopplistan)	1

== See also ==
- List of Swedish number-one hits
