= Håkan Persson =

Swedish music journalist

Håkan Persson is a Swedish music journalist, born in Stockholm, 1 June. He has been the host and producer of P3 Rock, a radio show on P3, Sveriges Radio, since 1996. He started doing radio in 1981, with the punk show Ny Våg. He has continued to present radio shows, including änubah!, Inferno, Slammer, and Musikjournalen.
