= Ännu doftar kärlek =

Single by Marie Fredriksson

from the album Het vind
- B-side: "Tag detta hjärta"
- Released: 15 May 1984
- Studio: EMI Studios, Stockholm
- Genre: Pop rock
- Length: 3:48
- Label: EMI
- Songwriters: Marie Fredriksson; Lars-Göran "Lasse" Lindbom
- Producer: Lindbom

Marie Fredriksson singles chronology
"Ännu doftar kärlek" (1984)	"Het vind" (1985)

"Ännu doftar kärlek" ("There's Still a Scent of Love") is a song by Swedish singer-songwriter Marie Fredriksson, issued on 15 May 1984. Fredriksson had previously been lead vocalist for two commercially unsuccessful rock bands, Strul (Trivial) and MaMas Barn (MaMas Children). Following the disbandment of the latter group, she signed a recording contract as a solo artist with EMI Svenska, who released "Ännu doftar kärlek" as the lead single from her debut studio album, Het vind (1984).

The track was written by Fredriksson, the sole credited lyricist, and its music was composed by Fredriksson alongside record producer Lars-Göran "Lasse" Lindbom; he had previously produced several albums by pop rock band Gyllene Tider, whose lead vocalist, Per Gessle, co-wrote the b-side for "Ännu doftar kärlek"—"Tag detta hjärta" ("Take This Heart"). In 1986, Fredriksson and Gessle formed pop duo Roxette, who would go on to sell over 75 million records worldwide.

The song became a minor hit in her home country upon release, peaking at number eighteen on Sverigetopplistan and spending a sole week on the chart. Despite this limited commercial success, the track went on to attain enduring popularity in Sweden; it is regularly played at both weddings and funerals. On 8 June 2013, Fredriksson performed the song live in the Royal Chapel of Stockholm, during the wedding ceremony of Princess Madeleine of Sweden and Christopher O'Neill.

== Track listing ==
Track 1 written by Marie Fredriksson and Lasse Lindbom; track 2 written by Per Gessle and Lindbom.

- 7" single (EMI 1361457)
1. "Ännu doftar kärlek" – 3:48
2. "Tag detta hjärta" – 4:08

== Credits and personnel ==
Credits adapted from the liner notes of the original vinyl single.

Musicians

- Marie Fredriksson – lead and background vocals, synthesizer solo
- Per "Pelle" Andersson – drums
- "Backa" Hans Eriksson – bass guitar
- Jan "Nane" Kvillsäter – electric guitar
- Lars-Göran "Lasse" Lindbom – acoustic guitar, engineering, mixing
- Hans "Hasse" Olsson – piano and synthesizer

Technical

- Kjell Andersson – sleeve design
- Calle Bengtsson – photography
- Björn Boström – engineering

== Charts ==
Chart (1984–2013)	Peak position
Sweden (Sverigetopplistan)	18
Sweden Digital Songs (Billboard)	45

== Other versions ==
"Ännu doftar kärlek" has been covered by several other recording artists. Four different versions of the song were released in 1985 alone; it appeared as the opening track on Stefan Borsch's album Sjung din sång, and as the title track on Curt Haagers' record Ännu doftar kärlek. Haagers' version became a substantial airplay hit, peaking within the top five of the Svensktoppen chart. The song also appeared on Ingmar Nordströms' album Saxparty 12. Finnish vocalist Marisa released "Jos Yhä Sydän Tuntee" ("If You've Ever Known How It Feels to Have a Heart") – a translated version of "Ännu doftar kärlek" – as a double A-side with her original composition "Tanssi Kanssani" ("Dance with Me"). "Jos Yhä Sydän Tuntee" later appeared on Marisa's self-titled debut album, which was eventually released in 1987. Erik Linder, a semi-finalist in the 2009 series of Sweden's Got Talent, recorded versions of both "Ännu doftar kärlek" and Fredriksson's 1996 single "Tro" for his 2009 album Inifrån.
