= Så skimrande var aldrig havet =

Song
- Language: Swedish
- Written: 1948
- Songwriter(s): Evert Taube

"Så skimrande var aldrig havet" (English: "The Sea Was Never So Shimmering") is a 1948 love ballad written by Evert Taube. Taube was one of Sweden's most popular songwriters.

Roxette vocalist Marie Fredriksson recorded a critically acclaimed version for the 1990 tribute album Taube. In 1997, Norwegian singer Elisabeth Andreassen recorded the song as the title track on her album Så skimrande var aldrig havet.
