= Marie Fredriksson =

Swedish singer (1958–2019)

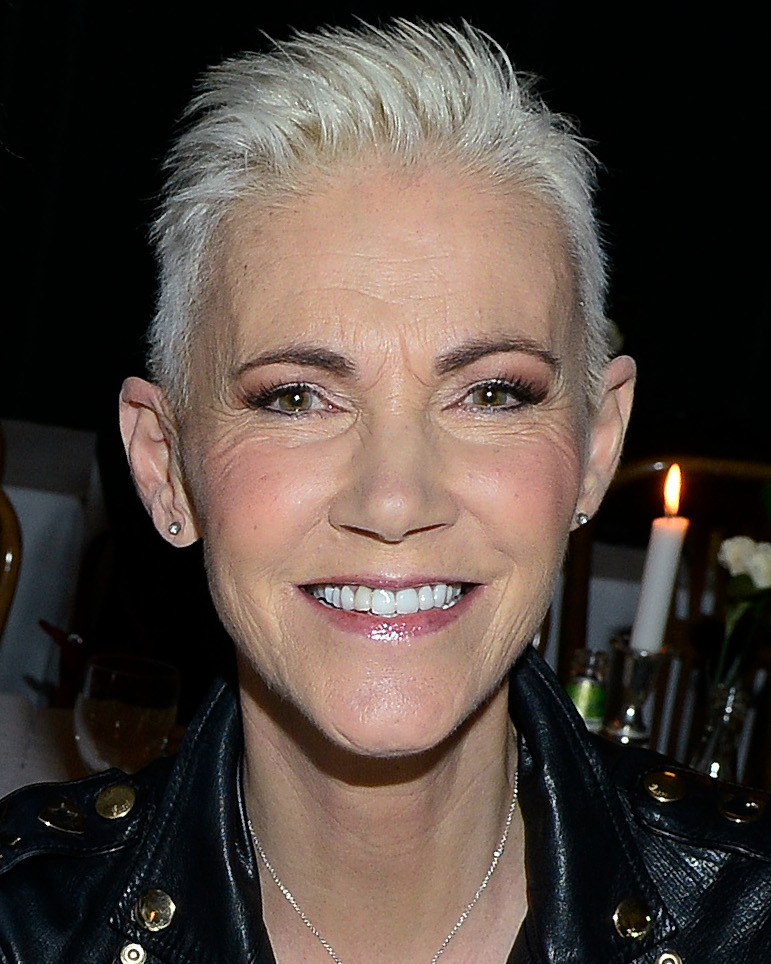
- Fredriksson in 2014
- Born: Gun-Marie Fredriksson; 30 May 1958; Össjö, Sweden
- Died: 9 December 2019 (aged 61); Djursholm, Sweden
- Occupations: Singer; songwriter
- Years active: 1978–2018
- Spouse: Mikael Bolyos (m. 1994)
- Children: 2
- Musical career
- Genre: Pop rock
- Instruments: Vocals; piano; keyboards
- Formerly of: Strul; MaMas Barn; Spännande Ostar; Roxette; Artister för Miljö
- Website: mariefredriksson.se

Gun-Marie Fredriksson (Swedish pronunciation: [ˈɡɵnː maˈriː ˈfrêːdrɪkˌsɔn]; 30 May 1958 – 9 December 2019) was a Swedish singer, songwriter, pianist, and lead vocalist of pop-rock duo Roxette, which she formed in 1986 with Per Gessle. The duo achieved international success in the late 1980s and early 1990s with their albums Look Sharp! (1988) and Joyride (1991), and had multiple hits on the Billboard Hot 100, including four number ones.

Fredriksson had a successful career in her native country prior to forming Roxette. She was a member of punk group Strul, a band which created their own music festival in 1979. Strul's dissolution led to the creation of her next project, the short-lived MaMas Barn, after which she began releasing solo work. Her first album, Het vind, was issued in 1984, followed by Den sjunde vågen in 1986 and ... Efter stormen in 1987. Roxette's international breakthrough coincided with a period of inactivity for Fredriksson as a solo artist, punctuated only by the release of the non-album single "Sparvöga" in 1989. Subsequent solo albums included Den ständiga resan (1992) and I en tid som vår (1996).

In 2002, after fainting at home, Fredriksson was diagnosed with a brain tumour. During her rehabilitation, she continued to record music as a solo artist, resulting in The Change in 2004 and Min bäste vän in 2006, as well as the non-album single "Där du andas" in 2008—her first and only solo number one single in Sweden. She and Gessle later reunited to record more albums as Roxette, and the pair embarked on a worldwide concert tour. She also continued to record as a solo artist in her native Sweden, releasing Nu! in 2013. Fredriksson died on 9 December 2019 as a result of health issues stemming from her brain tumour.

== Early life ==
Gun-Marie Fredriksson was born on 30 May 1958 outside the small Swedish village of Össjö. When she was four years old, her parents sold their farm and relocated to Östra Ljungby, where her father Gösta took a job as a postman and her mother Inez became a factory worker. Three years later, her oldest sister Anna-Lisa was involved in a fatal traffic collision; her car was crushed by a tanker truck while she was travelling to purchase a dress for her engagement party. Marie explained: "She was 20 – and I can barely remember her today. But I remember the grief, how the family was torn apart. Completely. After that I had to fend for myself. I was only seven years old."

With both parents in full-time employment but unable to afford child care, Marie and her underage siblings would often be left unaccompanied at home while their parents worked. It was during this period, with the help of siblings and friends, that she learned how to sing, read notation and play musical instruments. She also credited her pastor with encouraging her love of music, and said that she had been performing "ever since I was little and me and my sister Tina went to Sunday school. We had a wonderful pastor in Östra Ljungby. I've got really bright, lovely memories of that place, even when my big sister died. I loved all the songs. It was such a source of freedom for me… for both of us."

Her interest in music continued to grow throughout her teens, as she discovered artists such as The Beatles, Joni Mitchell, Jimi Hendrix and Deep Purple. She enrolled in a music school in the Svalöv Municipality at the age of seventeen, where she befriended students from the theatre department by composing music for their amateur plays. Since no other vocalist in the school could emulate Fredriksson's vocal range, she joined the cast of a musical she co-wrote. This musical toured throughout Sweden, with its run culminating in a performance in Stockholm for Prime Minister Olof Palme.

== Career ==
=== 1978–1984: Early work ===
After graduating from music school in 1977, Fredriksson moved to Halmstad, where she worked in theatre before becoming involved in the local indie music scene. She formed punk group Strul (English: Hassle) in 1978 with then-boyfriend Stefan Dernbrant—the band consisted of an extensive and fractious lineup of musicians, the majority of whom would leave after a single performance. Strul established their own independent music festival in 1979, Strulfestivalen, which was financially lucrative for the band. The festival was held each summer for three years, until 1981. Dernbrant exited the group in December 1980 when he and Fredriksson ended their relationship. Due to the success of the festival, Fredriksson opted to continue performing under the Strul name alongside the band's other longest-serving member, guitarist Martin Sternhufvud. The group's popularity increased substantially in 1981, culminating in several performances on Swedish music television programmes. This exposure led to Strul signing with independent record label Bastun, which released their first and only single in June, the double A-side "Ki-I-Ai-Oo" / "Strul igen". The release was timed to coincide with the 1981 version of Strulfestivalen, which would be the last; three months later, the group permanently disbanded following a "disastrous" performance at the Pop Around the Clock festival, which was broadcast nationally on Swedish radio.

Following Strul's breakup, Fredriksson and Sternhufvud formed a new band, MaMas Barn (English: MaMas Children). The two were the only permanent members, with Sternhufvud moving to vocals and Fredriksson to keyboards. The name was created by combining the first two letters of both members' given names. The duo regularly shared a rehearsal space with Gyllene Tider - a successful Swedish band fronted by Per Gessle - leading to that band's bassist and drummer – Anders Herrlin and Mickael "Syd" Andersson, respectively – joining MaMas Barn. This close relationship between the two bands resulted in Fredriksson performing vocals on Gyllene Tider's 1981 song "Ingenting av vad du behöver" (English: "Nothing of What You Need"). The following year, MaMas Barn signed with CBS Records International before their recording contract was sold to WEA International, which financed the recording of their only album, Barn som barn (English: Children as Children). The album was produced by ABBA guitarist Finn Sjöberg and eventually released in November 1982. Although it was a critical success, the record struggled commercially, selling approximately 1,000 copies. The group disbanded shortly after.

"Så nära nu"
30-second sample of "Så nära nu", released as the lead single from the Lasse Lindbom Band's 1982 album Romantisk Blackout

Believing Fredriksson to be "too talented to be hiding behind keyboards", Gessle invited her to audition for Gyllene Tider's producer Lars-Göran "Lasse" Lindbom. Impressed with her voice, Lindbom offered Fredriksson a contract as a solo artist on EMI Sweden, although she initially refused the deal, saying she was "too nervous" and "lacked the confidence" to be a solo artist. She performed duet vocals on "Så nära nu" (English: "So Near Now"), the lead single from the Lasse Lindbom Band's 1982 album Romantisk Blackout. The album was successful in Sweden, and she joined Lindbom's band as a featured vocalist for an extensive tour of the country. Following its completion in the autumn of 1983, Fredriksson recorded backing vocals for Gyllene Tider's debut English album The Heartland Café, released in Sweden under the band's original name, and in EP format in North America under the name Roxette—derived from the Dr. Feelgood song of the same name.

=== 1984–1989: Solo work and Roxette ===
On Gessle's insistence, Fredriksson agreed to embark on a solo career in late 1983, recording her debut album from December 1983 to June 1984, with Lindbom as co-writer and producer. "Ännu doftar kärlek" (English: "Still the Scent of Love") was issued as her debut single in May 1984, becoming a top twenty hit on Sverigetopplistan, Sweden's national record chart. Her debut album, Het vind (English: Hot Wind), was released in September, and also peaked within the Sverigetopplistan top twenty. The album was promoted by a three-month double bill concert tour, featuring Fredriksson performing as a solo artist alongside Lindbom's eponymous band. The title track was issued as the second and final single in October, b/w a Swedish version of Cyndi Lauper's "All Through the Night", retitled "Natt efter natt" (English: "Night After Night").

Her first solo tour took place from March to June 1985, after which she performed vocals for Spännande Ostar (English: Exciting Cheeses). This cover band appeared on several Swedish television programmes, and consisted of Fredriksson and Lindbom performing alongside Per Gessle and Mats Persson. The same year, Fredriksson and Lindbom travelled to the Canary Islands to write songs for her second solo album. Den sjunde vågen (English: The Seventh Wave) was released in February 1986 and peaked at number six on Sverigetopplistan, selling over 90,000 copies. "Den bästa dagen" (English: "The Best Day") and "Silver i din hand" (English: "Silver in Your Hand") were issued as singles, while the title track and "Mot okända hav" (English: "Toward Unknown Seas") were top ten hits on Svensktoppen, Sweden's airplay-based chart. She won the 1986 Rockbjörnen award for Best Swedish Female, and embarked on her second tour as a solo artist.

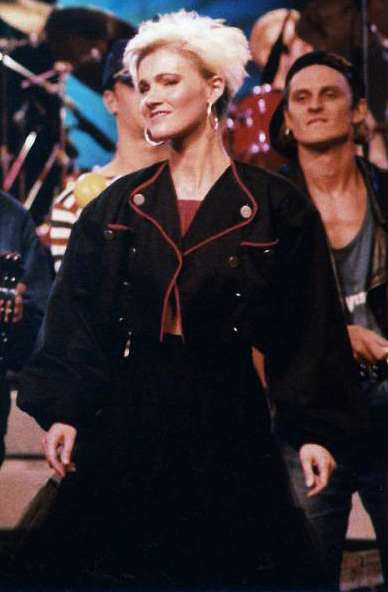
Fredriksson performing in Gävle on 5 August 1987 during Rock runt riket

While Fredriksson had established herself as a prominent soloist, Gessle's solo work struggled to replicate the success of Gyllene Tider; his second studio album Scener (1985) sold less than 20,000 copies, a significant drop from the 400,000 copies sold by Moderna tider four years earlier. EMI Sweden's managing director, Rolf Nygren, suggested Gessle translate one of his Swedish compositions to English and record it as a duet with Fredriksson. The resulting song, "Neverending Love", was issued under the band name Roxette—the name Gyllene Tider had used to release The Heartland Café in North America in 1984. The track peaked at number three on the Swedish Singles Chart, and was one of the most popular songs on Swedish radio that year. Their debut album, Pearls of Passion, was a major success upon release in October 1986, peaking at number two and eventually selling over 200,000 copies, but it failed to chart internationally. Roxette embarked on their first tour in the summer of 1987, "Rock runt riket" ("Rock Around the Kingdom"), a 15-date co-headlining tour with Eva Dahlgren and Ratata.

Fredriksson's third studio album, ... Efter stormen (English: After the Storm), was issued in October 1987. It peaked at number one and sold over 50,000 copies within a month of release, and was certified platinum by the Swedish Recording Industry Association for shipments in excess of 100,000 units. Both the title track and "Bara för en dag" (English: "Just for a Day") were top ten hits on Svensktoppen, and she promoted the album with a sold-out concert tour. Roxette released their second studio album, Look Sharp!, on 21 October 1988. Once again, it was an immediate commercial success in Sweden, selling over 140,000 copies within ten days of release, but failed to chart internationally.

"Sparvöga"
30-second sample of "Sparvöga", which remains Fredriksson's highest-selling solo single in her native country

Two weeks later, EMI released Den flygande holländaren (The Flying Dutchman), a tribute album to musician Cornelis Vreeswijk, who died the previous year. Fredriksson performed three songs on the compilation. One of these, "Felicia – Adjö", became her first number one on Svensktoppen. Den flygande holländaren peaked at number two for three consecutive weeks in Sweden, held off the top spot by Look Sharp!. The compilation was certified double platinum there, denoting shipments in excess of 200,000 units. The non-album single "Sparvöga" ("Sparrow-eye") was recorded as the theme music for a miniseries of the same name, and became both her highest-peaking and best-selling single to date when it was issued in February 1989. Fredriksson won the award for Pop/Rock Female at the 1989 Grammis, the Swedish equivalent of the Grammy Awards, as well as the Rockbjörnen award for Best Swedish Female, for the fourth consecutive year.

=== 1989–1992: Roxette's international breakthrough ===
"The Look" was issued as the third single from Look Sharp! in Sweden, and was a top ten hit upon release in January 1989. The following month, the track unexpectedly entered the Billboard Hot 100, despite the duo not having a recording contract in the US; the local branch of EMI had previously rejected Roxette as "unsuitable for the American market." An exchange student from Minnesota returned from Sweden and asked his local Minneapolis-based Top 40 radio station to play the song. The track quickly became popular, and the station began distributing the song to their sister radio operations throughout the US. "The Look" topped the chart after just eight weeks, and went on to peak at number one in a total of 25 countries. The single's parent album eventually sold over 9 million copies worldwide. "Listen to Your Heart" was the band's second number one on the Hot 100, while the album's final single, "Dangerous", spent two weeks at number two. Fredriksson ended 1989 performing on-stage as part of The Husbands, a cover band formed by Lasse Lindbom and Niklas Strömstedt.

"Så skimrande var aldrig havet"
28-second sample of Fredriksson's recording of Evert Taube's "Så skimrande var aldrig havet", released on the 1990 tribute album Taube

In 1990, Fredriksson contributed a cover of the Evert Taube composition "Så skimrande var aldrig havet" ("The Sea Was Never So Sparkling") to the tribute album Taube. The same year, Touchstone Pictures approached Gessle to compose a song for the upcoming film Pretty Woman. As he did not have time to compose a new song—Roxette had recently embarked on their first international concert tour—a new edit of their 1987 single "It Must Have Been Love" was created, and featured prominently in the movie. The track became their third number one on the Hot 100, and remains one of Roxette's best-known and most successful singles. The following year, the duo released their third album, Joyride, which remains their most successful release, with worldwide sales of over 11 million copies. The title track gave them their fourth and final number one on the Hot 100, while "Fading Like a Flower (Every Time You Leave)" peaked at number two. The album was promoted by the "Join the Joyride! Tour", their biggest and widest ranging tour.

=== 1992–2002: Continued solo work ===
Fredriksson returned to solo work following the recording of Roxette's fourth album, Tourism. She was a featured vocalist on "Änglamark" ("Angel Land"), a Band Aid-style recording spearheaded by former ABBA vocalist Anni-Frid Lyngstad under the banner Artister för Miljö (Artists for the Environment), which was released in July 1992. She also performed the track alongside all of the other featured artists during a televised gala the following month. Fredriksson's fourth solo album, Den ständiga resan (The Eternal Journey), was released that October, and remains both her highest-selling and most critically successful solo studio album, with sales of over 185,000 copies in Sweden as of 2002. She was nominated for three awards at the 1993 Grammis, including Songwriter of the Year and Artist of the Year, winning the latter. "Så länge det lyser mittemot" ("As Long as There Is Light on the Other Side") and "Mellan sommar och höst" ("Between Summer and Autumn") were issued as commercial singles; the latter song, "Så stilla så långsamt" ("So Still, So Slow") and "Det regnar igen" ("It's Raining Again"), were also top ten hits on Svensktoppen. She toured in support of the record.

Her first musical collaboration with husband Mikael Bolyos, "Herren ber för dig" ("The Lord Prays for You"), was released in November 1994 on the charitable compilation Vilda fåglar: sånger om barn (Wild Birds: Songs About Children), the proceeds of which were donated to children's hospitals in Nordic territories. The next summer, she was a featured vocalist with Bolyos' band Sugarcane, during their concert residency in Halmstad nightclub Penny Lane. She took part in this residency every summer between 1995 and 2002, performing vocals on several of Bolyos' original compositions and numerous cover versions, including "The Good Life".

Her fifth solo album, I en tid som vår (In a Time Like Ours), was recorded by Fredriksson and Bolyos at their home studio in Djursholm between February and September 1996. She was eight months pregnant when it was released in November, so was unable to promote it. The album peaked at number two on Sverigetopplistan, and lead single "Tro" became the longest-charting song of her career on the Swedish Singles Chart, either as a solo artist or as part of Roxette; it reached number eight and spent a total of 29 weeks on the chart. Her duet with Anni-Frid Lyngstad, "Alla mina bästa år" ("All My Best Years") – from Frida's 1996 album Djupa andetag (Deep Breaths) – was released as a single in February 1997.

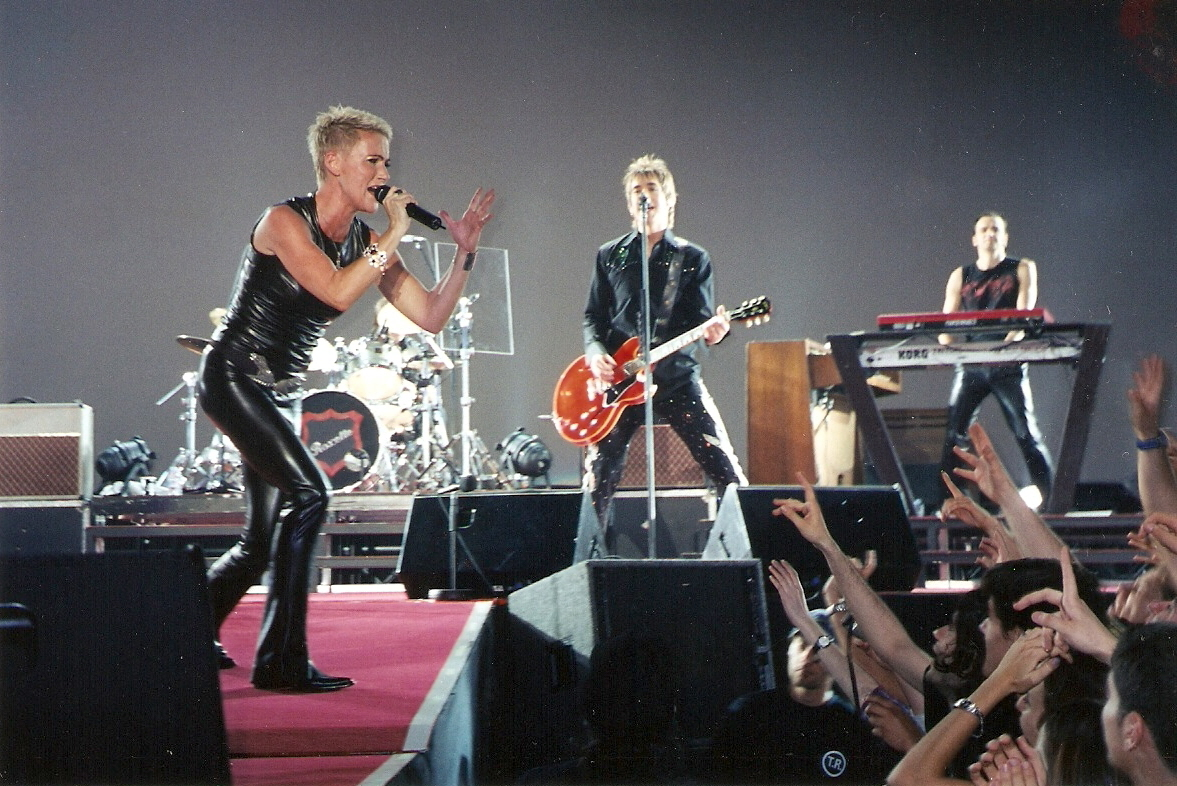
Fredriksson performing as part of Roxette at Palau Sant Jordi in Barcelona on 24 October 2001

Fredriksson and Gessle collaborated on a new Roxette album throughout 1997 and 1998; Have a Nice Day was eventually released in February 1999. She was more involved in its composition and production than on previous Roxette releases, recording numerous demos at her Djursholm studio and singing lead vocals on ten of the album's fourteen songs. The record includes "Waiting for the Rain", the first Roxette song written and composed solely by Fredriksson. Prior to the album's release, the duo signed a new recording contract with their longterm label EMI, which saw Fredriksson obtain the copyright for her entire solo discography. The process of recording the album was reputedly difficult and confrontational, with Fredriksson later heavily criticising co-producer Michael Ilbert: "I ended up under his thumb. He would only communicate with Per and [Roxette's regular producer] Clarence Öfwerman. He complained to everyone that my voice was weak, that I needed to re-record vocals, and that my songs weren't good enough. He criticised me until I started crying. I lost all my confidence, and no longer felt happy in Roxette."

Her first greatest hits album, Äntligen – Marie Fredrikssons bästa 1984–2000, was released in 2000, and was the second best-selling album of the year in Sweden, behind the Beatles compilation 1. It was also one of the best-selling albums of 2001 in the country, and was certified triple platinum for shipments of almost 250,000 units. The two new songs recorded for the compilation, "Äntligen" ("Finally") and "Det som var nu" ("That What Was Now"), were both minor hits. The latter song featured Patrik Isaksson, and was a Swedish re-recording of a demo originally produced by Fredriksson for Have a Nice Day. The record was promoted with a Swedish tour.

In 2001, Roxette released their seventh album, Room Service. Even though Ilbert was not present for this album's recording, Marie later said she "lost all desire to continue Roxette", and would appear at the recording studio as infrequently as possible; she instructed her taxi driver to wait outside while she recorded vocals for "Milk and Toast and Honey". The album was supported with a European tour, after which Fredriksson "called for a meeting" with Gessle, wherein she discussed disbanding Roxette, to which Gessle agreed. She issued a box set containing all of her previous studio albums, Kärlekens guld (Love's Gold), in June 2002. Roxette scheduled the release of two new compilation albums, The Ballad Hits and The Pop Hits, which were to be promoted with performances at the 2002 edition of the pan-European orchestral concert series "Night of the Proms". A press conference announcing these appearances as Roxette's "swan song" was scheduled to take place in the Netherlands on 12 September 2002.

=== 2002–2003: Brain tumour diagnosis and aftermath ===
On 11 September 2002, Fredriksson complained of feeling unwell after jogging with her husband. She collapsed in a bathroom after becoming nauseated, with the impact of the fall fracturing her cranium. She then had an epileptic seizure. Scans later indicated she had a brain tumour in the back of her head. The diagnosis led to the cancellation of Roxette's "Night of the Proms" appearances. After waiting several weeks for the effects of the fracture and resulting concussion to subside, she underwent successful surgery to remove the tumour, which was malignant, and she endured months of chemotherapy and radiation treatment.

In January 2003, King of Sweden Carl Gustaf XVI awarded Roxette the Litteris et Artibus (Culture and Education) award. Both Gessle and Fredriksson attended the ceremony, which was the first event Fredriksson appeared at after her operation, and one of very few public appearances she made over the next two years. Lasting effects of the tumour included her being blind in one eye and having limited hearing and mobility, as well as being unable to read or write. She was also unable to speak for a considerable period of time after her treatment. On 21 October 2005, Fredriksson conducted an interview with Swedish newspaper Aftonbladet, saying: "It's been three very difficult years, [but] I'm healthy. I'm not receiving treatment any more."

=== 2004–2008: Return to creativity ===
Following her diagnosis and treatment, Fredriksson and Bolyos began work on her next studio album as a form of therapy at their home studio in Djursholm. The Change debuted atop the Swedish Album Chart, and was certified gold for shipments in excess of 30,000 units. It ended 2004 as the 18th best selling album in the country. Several of the songs included were debuted during Fredriksson's live appearances with Sugarcane in the mid-1990s. It was also her first studio album to receive a worldwide release. Lead single "2:nd Chance" was a top ten hit in Sweden. Despite being unable to read or write, Fredriksson rediscovered her love of drawing during her illness, and began using charcoal to create artwork as another form of therapy. She drew the cover art which accompanied The Change, and held her first art exhibition – titled "After the Change" – at the vernissage of the Doktor Glas gallery in Kungsträdgården, Stockholm in October 2005. Every painting displayed at the exhibition was sold by the end of the second day. She held further art exhibitions, titled "A Table in the Sun", in both Stockholm and Gothenburg in 2008.

In February 2006, she released an album of Swedish cover songs titled Min bäste vän (My Best Friend), which peaked at number three on the Swedish Albums Chart. Later that year, she collaborated with Gessle on the recording of two new Roxette songs: "One Wish" and "Reveal", which were released on the greatest hits compilation A Collection of Roxette Hits: Their 20 Greatest Songs!. Fredriksson performed vocals on several tracks of Bolyos' debut solo album A Family Affair, which was released in June 2007. In November, Capitol Records issued a ballad compilation of Fredriksson's Swedish-language solo material, Tid för tystnad – Marie Fredrikssons ballader (Time for Silence – Marie Fredriksson's Ballads). The compilation contained two previously unreleased recordings, one of which, "Ordet är farväl" ("The Word Is Goodbye"), was based on a lyric Py Bäckman wrote for Fredriksson's 1984 album Het vind.

=== 2008–2018: Return to touring, Roxette reunion and solo work ===
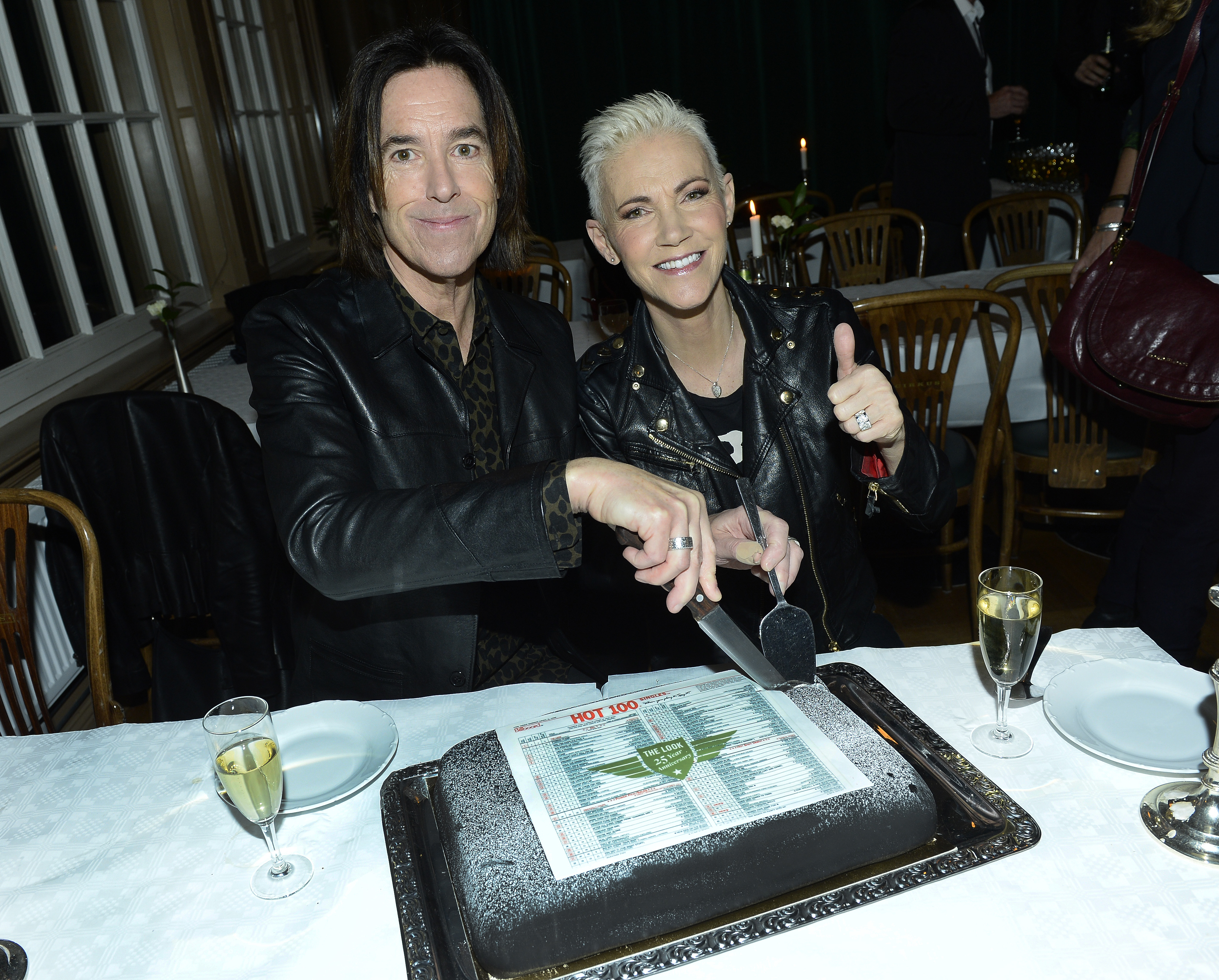
Gessle and Fredriksson celebrating the 25th anniversary of "The Look" topping the Billboard Hot 100 in April 2014

"Där du andas" ("Where You Breathe") was released in August 2008 as the theme song to the film Arn – The Kingdom at Road's End, and became Fredriksson's first number one single in her home country. During the winter of 2008, she took part in the "Stjärnklart" ("Starlit") series of concerts, which saw her performing an abbreviated set alongside other vocalists in Swedish concert halls. In May 2009, she joined Gessle on-stage at the Melkweg in Amsterdam to perform acoustic renditions of several Roxette songs, during a concert of his "Party Crasher Tour". Immediately after the gig, Gessle announced to Aftonbladet that Roxette would perform at the 2009 edition of "Night of the Proms". On the first night of that tour, Expressen reported that the duo had been recording material for a new album since May 2009.

The duo reunited for a private performance at the Wedding of Victoria, Crown Princess of Sweden, and Daniel Westling at Stockholm Palace on 18 June 2010. Roxette then embarked on a seven-date tour of Europe in the summer of 2010. "She's Got Nothing On (But the Radio)" was released in January 2011, becoming a substantial hit in mainland Europe, and their highest-peaking single in Germany since 1992's "How Do You Do!". Their eighth studio album, Charm School, followed the next month. "The Neverending World Tour", their first world tour in fifteen years, began in March 2011, eventually concluding in February 2016. Another studio album, Travelling, was released in March 2012. In June 2013, Fredriksson performed "Ännu doftar kärlek" at the Wedding of Princess Madeleine and Christopher O'Neill. In November, she released Nu! (Now!), her first album of original Swedish material since 1996. It was supported by a nineteen-date tour of Swedish concert halls, her first solo concerts since 2000.

Roxette's tenth studio album, Good Karma, was released in June 2016, and was due to be promoted with a European tour celebrating the duo's 30th anniversary. However, these concerts were cancelled after Fredriksson was advised by her doctors to cease all touring activity, due to poor health. She released a statement saying: "Sadly, now my touring days are over and I want to take this opportunity to thank our wonderful fans that [have] followed us on our long and winding journey." Fredriksson released three non-album singles after she announced her retirement from touring: "Alone Again" and "I Want to Go" in 2017, and "Sing Me a Song" in 2018.

== Personal life ==
Fredriksson met her husband, keyboardist Mikael "Micke" Bolyos, during the Australian leg of "Join the Joyride!" in December 1991. She later said of the impact meeting Bolyos had on her professional career: "If [we] hadn't met, I don't know if I would have been able to continue in Roxette much longer. I couldn't handle the personal side of life on tour. I was hanging out in bars, drinking too much. I was sad a lot of the time and had a hard time with the press, when I always had to be nice and say the right things, always having to be available to everybody, always putting on a smile and being happy. Marie Fredriksson the performer had grown in stature, at the expense of Marie the private person. I had less and less space to be myself, and when I was myself I felt uncertain, small and lost."

The couple married in a private ceremony in May 1994, which was attended only by immediate family members. Her decision not to invite Gessle and his wife to the wedding briefly became a source of tension between the duo. She later explained: "Some of our friends felt excluded and disappointed. Today I understand that, for example, Per and [his wife] were hurt [not to be invited], but then I didn't see it that way. My only concern was that I wanted the wedding to be private. It was what felt important then." Fredriksson and Bolyos had two children, a daughter (Inez Josefin) and a son (Oscar Mikael).

== Death ==
Fredriksson died on 9 December 2019 at the age of 61, having had cancer for 17 years since her 2002 brain tumour diagnosis. A private funeral, with only her immediate family in attendance, took place at an undisclosed location. Among the tributes expressed to Fredriksson was a statement from King Carl XVI Gustaf of Sweden, who said "We have been struck by the sad news that singer Marie Fredriksson has passed away. For many in our country, even in my family, her music is closely associated with memories from particularly important moments in life." A concert in memory of Fredriksson took place at the Stora Teatern in Gothenburg on 20 January, featuring performances from Per Gessle and Eva Dahlgren. The concert was broadcast in its entirety five days later on Sveriges Television.

=== Posthumous releases ===
A previously unreleased solo song titled "Sea of Love" was issued posthumously on the first anniversary of her death. Recorded in 2017, it was the final track she recorded in her lifetime, and was inspired by the peaceful demonstrations that followed the 2017 Stockholm truck attack. Roxette issued a compilation album of outtakes titled Bag of Trix on 11 December 2020, containing several previously unreleased demos composed by Fredriksson. Another solo song, "Stay", was released as a non-album single on 28 May 2021.

== Discography ==
- Het vind (1984)
- Den sjunde vågen (1986)
- ... Efter stormen (1987)
- Den ständiga resan (1992)
- I en tid som vår (1996)
- The Change (2004)
- Min bäste vän (2006)
- Nu! (2013)

== Awards and nominations ==
- Rockbjörnen Awards

| Year | Nominee / work | Award | Result | Ref. |
|---|---|---|---|---|
| 1986 | Marie Fredriksson | Best Swedish Female | Won | |
| 1987 | Marie Fredriksson | Best Swedish Female | Won | |
| 1987 | Efter stormen | Best Swedish Album | Won | |
| 1988 | Marie Fredriksson | Best Swedish Female | Won | |
| 1989 | Marie Fredriksson | Best Swedish Female | Won | |

- Swedish Grammy Awards

| Year | Nominee / work | Award | Result | Ref. |
|---|---|---|---|---|
| 1988 | Marie Fredriksson | Pop/Rock – Female | Nominated | |
| 1989 | Marie Fredriksson | Pop/Rock – Female | Won | |
| 1993 | Marie Fredriksson | Pop/Rock – Female | Nominated | |
| 1993 | Marie Fredriksson | Artist of the Year | Won | |
| 1993 | Marie Fredriksson | Songwriter of the Year | Nominated | |
| 1997 | Marie Fredriksson | Pop/Rock – Female | Nominated | |

== See also ==
- List of Swedes in music

== Works cited ==
- Lundgren, Larz; Wikström, Jan-Owe (1992). Roxette: The Book. Wahlström & Widstrand. ISBN 91-46-16211-9.
- Fredriksson, Marie; von Zweigbergk, Helena (2015). Kärleken till livet. Piratförlaget. ISBN 9789164204639.
