= Den ständiga resan =

Studio album by Marie Fredriksson
- Released: 9 October 1992
- Recorded: 1991–92
- Genre: Alternative rock; blues rock; ambient pop; hard rock
- Length: 61:18
- Language: Swedish
- Label: EMI Svenska AB
- Producer: Marie Fredriksson; Anders Herrlin

Marie Fredriksson chronology
... Efter stormen (1987)	Den ständiga resan (1992)	I en tid som vår (1996)

Singles from Den ständiga resan
- 1. "Så länge det lyser mittemot" Released: 28 October 1992; 2. "Mellan sommar och höst" Released: 26 February 1993

Den ständiga resan (The Eternal Journey) is the fourth studio album by Swedish singer-songwriter Marie Fredriksson, released on 9 October 1992 by EMI Sweden. Predominantly composed during Roxette's "Join the Joyride! Tour", the album contains some of Fredriksson's darkest lyrical content.

"Så länge det lyser mittemot" ("As Long as There Is Light on the Other Side") and "Mellan sommar och höst" ("Between Summer and Autumn") were issued as singles. The latter song, along with "Så stilla så långsamt" ("So Still, So Slow") and "Det regnar igen" ("It's Raining Again"), were top ten hits on the Swedish Airplay Chart.

The album remains both her highest-selling and most critically successful release in her native country. It spent two weeks atop the Swedish Albums Chart, where it was certified platinum within a month of release. As of 2002, the record sold over 185,000 copies in Sweden alone, and remains her only studio album to chart outside of Sweden, peaking within the top twenty of the Norwegian Albums Chart. The success the record achieved in Scandinavia led EMI to release it internationally; it was issued throughout Europe, as well as in Japan, Taiwan, Indonesia and Malaysia.

== Background ==
Marie Fredriksson began her musical career as keyboardist and co-lead vocalist of Swedish punk rock group Strul (Trivial' or 'Insignificant), who released their first and only single in 1981 before disbanding the following year. Strul's only permanent members – Fredriksson and her then-boyfriend Martin Sternhufvud – went on to form power pop band MaMas Barn alongside Gyllene Tider bassist Anders Herrlin and drummer Micke "Syd" Andersson.

The latter band issued their only album in 1982, Barn som barn (English: Children as Children), which struggled commercially. Fredriksson then embarked upon a career as a solo artist, releasing Het vind (English: Hot Wind) in 1984, Den sjunde vågen (English: The Seventh Wave) in 1986, and Efter stormen (English: After the Storm) in 1987, all of which were recorded with Gyllene Tider producer Lars-Göran "Lasse" Lindbom.

In 1986, Fredriksson formed pop duo Roxette alongside Gyllene Tider vocalist Per Gessle. Roxette experienced an international breakthrough with albums Look Sharp! (1988) and Joyride (1991), and had a string of worldwide hit singles, including the Billboard Hot 100 number ones "The Look", "Listen to Your Heart", "It Must Have Been Love" and "Joyride".

== Composition and style ==
Den ständiga resan was Fredriksson's first solo album since 1987, and was produced alongside Gyllene Tider and MaMas Barn bassist Anders Herrlin. The album contains material which has been ascribed to a diverse range of genres, such as alternative rock, acoustic rock, ambient pop and hard rock, as well as blues rock and jazz pop. Fredriksson wrote the lyrics to every song on the album, and was the sole composer of the vast majority of music, with the exception of "Ett enda liv", "Den där novemberdan" and "Vem tror du att du är?", which were co-written with Herrlin.

The majority of songs were written by Fredriksson while performing on Roxette's "Join the Joyride! Tour". She later said of that tour: "You really learn to live this life – a very strange life – because you're almost always travelling and there's always people around you, wherever you are, so you rarely have peace and quiet to be yourself. ... I sat and wrote [Den ständiga resan] while I was having lunch, because there was a certain quiet then. It was such an intrusive routine."

"Den ständiga resan"
30-second sample of the song's final chorus. Fredriksson described the track as "pure and overwhelming anguish, the kind I thought I could never write about; the very dark thoughts inside me."

The record contains some of the most oppressive lyrical content Fredriksson has written. She described the title track as "pure and overwhelming anguish, the kind I thought I could never write about; the very dark thoughts inside me. It was written on a plane, flying to New York from some place I don't remember. After it was written, I presented the lyric to one of my best friends, who said, 'You can't play this. You can't sing about this. Because people might think that you will commit suicide.' So I was scared to release it. It was horrible to get that reaction. But when I look back and read the lyric, I realise it has an important message: it's possible to overcome those feelings."

"Så länge det lyser mittemot" was written when Fredriksson returned to her Stockholm apartment after a prolonged period of touring. She explained: "I had been travelling a lot, for maybe three or four months, and I felt so alone when I came back to a dusty, empty apartment. It's really depressing, to realise no-one has been in your home since you left it. I felt such a coldness. Then I sat on my couch and looked out the window at my neighbour's garden, which looked beautiful while the sun was shining. I felt then that I wasn't completely alone. It was a strange, comforting thought." "Ett enda liv" was inspired by the suicide of one of Fredriksson's childhood friends.

Album closer "Till sist" was written by Fredriksson in dedication to her future husband, Mikael "Micke" Bolyos, whom she met while touring Australia during "Join the Joyride!". She later commented: "If Micke and I hadn't met, I don't know if I would have been able to continue in Roxette much longer. I couldn't handle the personal side of life on tour. I was hanging out in bars, drinking too much. I was sad a lot of the time and had a hard time with the press, when I always had to be nice and say the right things, always having to be available to everybody, always putting on a smile and being happy. Marie Fredriksson the performer had grown in stature, at the expense of Marie the private person. I had less and less space to be myself. And when I was myself I felt uncertain, small and lost."

== Release and reception ==
The record was an immediate commercial success upon release on 9 October 1992, and remains Fredriksson's most commercially and critically successful solo studio album. It was promoted by a documentary directed by Jonas Åkerlund, who also created music videos for several songs on the album, many of which were never released as singles. Åkerlund later said that this collaboration with Fredriksson was his first experience working with an established recording artist, saying: "Marie was the first to give me a real chance. We made a visual album, back then [in 1992], which everyone does now. I have never worked with an artist who was so talented. Thanks to that, I got to know Per, got to do Roxette videos and eventually everything else I did." The album debuted at number two on the Swedish Albums Chart before spending two weeks at number one, and was certified platinum by the Swedish Recording Industry Association within a month of release, denoting shipments in excess of 100,000 units. As of 2002, Den ständiga resan sold in excess of 185,000 copies in Sweden alone. It also remains her only studio album to chart outside of Sweden, peaking at number 17 on the Norwegian Albums Chart.

Swedish journalist Håkan Pettersson included Den ständiga resan at number three on his list of the best albums of 1992, while Sveriges Television described it as Fredriksson's "great masterpiece" and "an obvious soundtrack to the hardships of adulthood." They elaborated that the tracks were tuned to the "same tone as the disillusionment and loneliness of adulthood, and nothing is as comforting as when Sweden's best singer puts words and music to these dark thoughts." Fredriksson was nominated for three awards at the 1993 Grammis, the Swedish equivalent of the Grammy Awards. She won the award for Artist of the Year, and also received nominations for Songwriter of the Year, as well as Pop/Rock – Female.

"Så länge det lyser mittemot" was released as the album's lead single throughout Europe on 28 October 1992, backed with the album version of "Den där novemberdan". The song peaked at number seventeen on Sveriges Radio's "Tracks" chart. Fredriksson toured Sweden in support of the album in November and December 1992. A further three songs from the record were top ten hits on Svensktoppen, Sweden's airplay-based chart: "Så stilla så långsamt", "Det regnar igen" and "Mellan sommar och höst". On 26 February 1993, the latter song was released exclusively in Sweden as the second and final single from the album; this single was issued in limited quantities – only 640 copies were manufactured – and featured live versions of "Bara för en dag", "Värdighet" and "Den bästa dagen" recorded at Stockholm Circus on 7 December 1992.

The success of the album in her native country led to EMI releasing Den ständiga resan outside of Sweden—the first time they had done so with any of her solo albums. The album was issued throughout Europe from 13 November, in Japan on Christmas Eve, and in Taiwan, Indonesia and Malaysia at various dates in 1993. The album was later reissued in Sweden on 5 March 2003. This version contained four bonus tracks, three of them being covers from the 1988 tribute album to Cornelis Vreeswijk: Den flygande holländaren. One of these, "Felicia – Adjö", was her first number one on Svensktoppen. Also included was her 1989 non-album single "Sparvöga".

Christer Björkman's recording of a song written during the Den ständiga resan sessions, "Om du bara sagt ja" ("If You Just Said Yes"), was released as a single from his 1992 album I morgon är en annan dag. "Den ständiga resan" was later covered by Swedish progressive death metal band Opeth and was featured on a special edition re-release of their 2008 album Watershed.

== Formats and track listings ==
All lyrics are written by Marie Fredriksson; all music is composed by Fredriksson, except tracks 8, 11 and 12, by Fredriksson and Anders Herrlin.

Den ständiga resan – LP/Cassette: Side A
No.	Title	English translation	Length
1.	"Intro"		0:48
2.	"Det regnar igen"	"It's Raining Again"	4:42
3.	"Så stilla så långsamt"	"So Still, So Slow"	5:40
4.	"Den ständiga resan"	"The Eternal Journey"	4:15
5.	"Så länge det lyser mittemot"	"As Long as There Is Light on the Other Side"	5:16
6.	"Där isen är som tunnast"	"Where the Ice Is Thinnest"	4:27
7.	"Medan tiden är inne"	"While There Is Still Time"	3:45

Den ständiga resan – LP/Cassette: Side B
No.	Title	English translation	Length
8.	"Ett enda liv"	"Only One Life"	4:51
9.	"Tid för tystnad"	"Time for Silence"	3:53
10.	"Det jag verkligen ville"	"What I Really Wanted"	3:41
11.	"Den där novemberdan"	"That November Day"	4:41
12.	"Vem tror du att du är?"	"Who Do You Think You Are?"	5:22
13.	"Genom ett krossat fönster"	"Through a Broken Window"	2:20
14.	"Mellan sommar och höst"	"Between Summer and Autumn"	4:19
15.	"Outro"		0:48
16.	"Till sist"	"At Last"	2:19
Total length:			1:01:18

Den ständiga resan – 2003 CD Bonus Tracks
No.	Title	Writer(s)	English translation	Length
17.	"Sparvöga"	Fredriksson	"Sparrow-eye" (or "Hawk-eye")	4:10
18.	"Ann-katrin, farväl"	Cornelis Vreeswijk; Per Alm	"Ann-Katrin, Farewell"	4:49
19.	"Felicia – adjö"	Vreeswijk	"Felicia – Goodbye"	4:28
20.	"Veronica"	Vreeswijk		4:15
Total length:				1:19:24

== Personnel ==
Credits adapted from the liner notes of Den ständiga resan.

Musicians

- Marie Fredriksson – vocals, composition, keyboard, church organ, production, arrangements and mixing
- Per "Pelle" Alsing – drums
- Anders Herrlin – composition, bass, synthesizer, engineering, production, arrangements and mixing
- Jonas Isacsson – acoustic and electric guitars

Additional musicians and technical personnel

- Kjell Andersson – sleeve design
- Micke "Syd" Andersson – percussion (track 6)
- Peter Dahl – mastering
- Mattias Edwall – photography
- Niklas Flyckt – additional engineering
- Stefan Glauman – mixing and additional engineering (track 6)
- Christer Jansson – Ghatam (track 12)
- Björn Norén – additional engineering
- Alar Suurna – engineering
- Pierre Swärd – Hammond organ (tracks 2 and 12)
- Nicki Wallin – drums (track 6)

== Charts and certifications ==
=== Weekly charts ===
Chart (1992)	Peak position
Norwegian Albums (VG-lista)	17
Swedish Albums (Sverigetopplistan)	1

=== Certifications ===
Region	Certification	Certified units/sales
Sweden (GLF)	Platinum	100,000^{^}
^{^} Shipments figures based on certification alone.

== Release history ==
Region	Date	Format	Label	Catalog #	Ref.
Sweden	14 October 1992	LP; CD; Cassette	EMI	4750281 (LP) · 4750282 (CD) · 4750284 (CS)	
Europe	13 November 1992	CD; Cassette	EMI	7808802 (CD) · 7808804 (CS)	
Japan	24 December 1992	CD	Toshiba EMI	TOCP–50097	
Taiwan	1993	CD	EMI	4750282	
Indonesia · Malaysia	1993	Cassette	EMI	TC–7808804	
Sweden	June 2002	Remastered 24-bit HDCD: Kärlekens guld box set	Capitol Records	7243 5 40199–2 0	
Sweden	5 March 2003	CD	Capitol Records	—	
