= Lustans Lakejer =

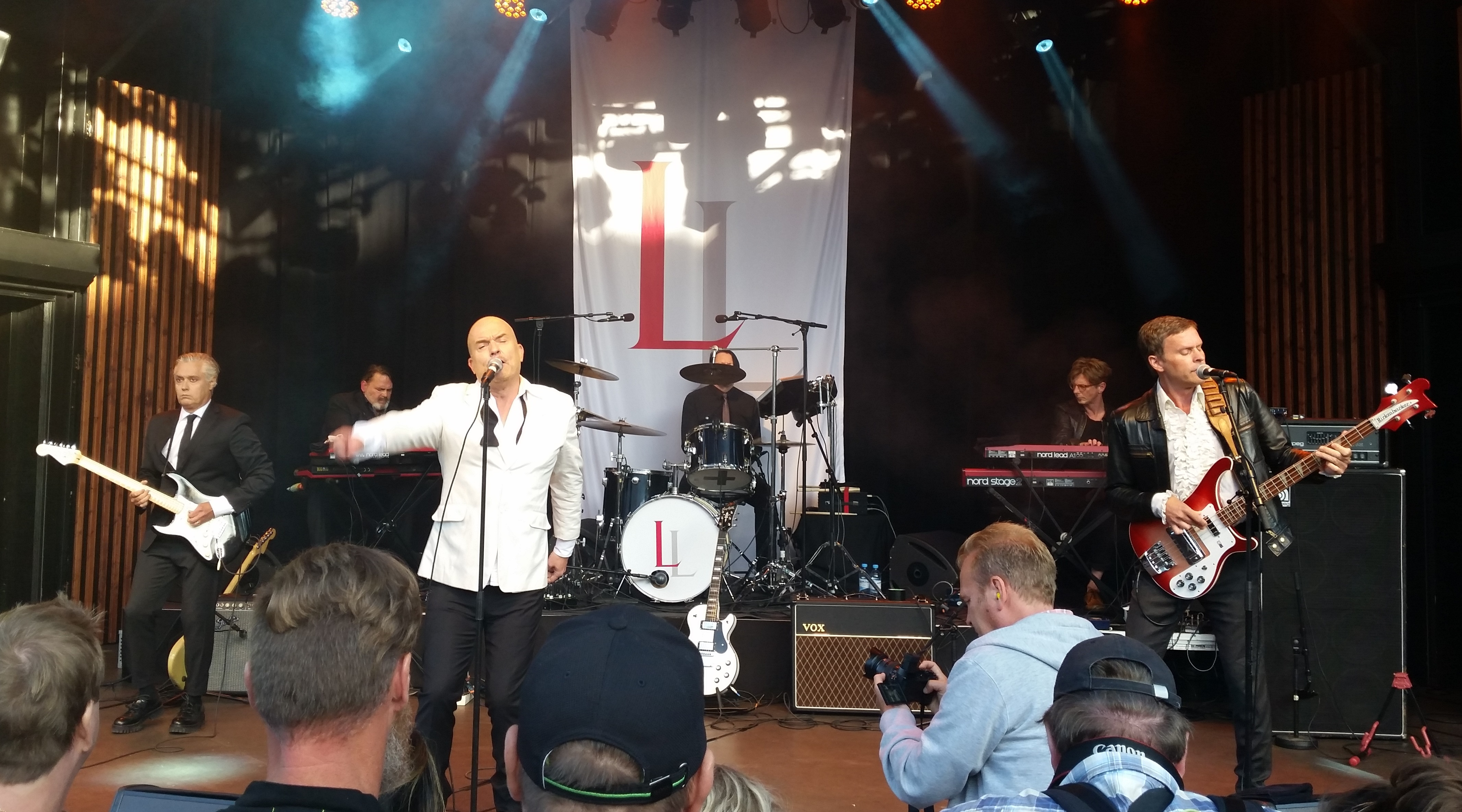
- Lustans Lakejer performing, 2017.

Background information
- Origin: Sweden
- Genres: New wave, synthpop
- Years active: 1978-

Lustans Lakejer (Lackeys of Lust) is a Swedish new wave group formed in 1978, subsequently led by singer-songwriter Johan Kinde who has been the only permanent member throughout their career. They were successful in the early 1980s, but by the mid-1980s, their popularity began to decline, and the members split up.

They were initially influenced by 1970's art rock and post-punk acts like Roxy Music, David Bowie, Joy Division, Magazine and Ultravox but adopted a more sophisticated synthpop and new romantic style on their most successful albums Uppdrag i Genève and En plats i solen. The latter album was produced by Richard Barbieri from the British group Japan and featured saxophone playing on three tracks by Mick Karn. The following year an English-language version of that album, A Place in the Sun, was released under the group name Vanity Fair, but with no commercial success.

By 1984 Johan Kinde had parted ways with the other original members and released two further albums as Lustans Lakejer and then embarked on a solo career.

Lustans Lakejer reformed in the 1990s and released the critically acclaimed album Åkersberga in 1999. In 2007 they reunited again to perform the song "Allt vi en gång trodde på" in Melodifestivalen's second semifinal for the opportunity to represent Sweden in the Eurovision Song Contest 2007 in Helsinki, Finland. The band failed to make the top five and was voted off the contest on 10 February before final voting.

In 2011 an album, Elixir, was released. In 2017 Lustans Lakejer performed the album En plats i solen in its entirety on a Swedish tour and were joined on stage by the album's producer Richard Barbieri on keyboards. One of the members was Tom Wolgers, son of Beppe Wolgers.
