= Efter stormen =

... Efter stormen

Studio album by Marie Fredriksson
- Released: 12 October 1987
- Recorded: May and September 1987
- Studio: EMI Studios, Stockholm
- Genre: Rock; folk
- Length: 48:43
- Language: Swedish
- Label: EMI Svenska AB
- Producer: Lasse Lindbom

Marie Fredriksson chronology
Den sjunde vågen (1986)	... Efter stormen (1987)	Den ständiga resan (1992)

Singles from Efter stormen
- 1. "Efter stormen" Released: 21 September 1987

... Efter stormen (After the Storm) is the third studio album by Swedish singer-songwriter Marie Fredriksson, released on 12 October 1987 by EMI Sweden. Her first release since Roxette's commercial breakthrough in Sweden, the album was a massive success, peaking at number one on the Swedish Albums Chart and selling over 50,000 copies within a month of release. It has since been certified platinum by the Swedish Recording Industry Association for shipments in excess of 100,000 units.

The title track preceded the album as its first and only commercial single, although "Bara för en dag" was also a top ten hit on the Swedish Airplay Chart. The record won Best Swedish Album at the 1987 Rockbjörnen awards, where Fredriksson won the award for Best Swedish Female. It also received a nomination at the 1988 Grammis Awards, the Swedish equivalent of the Grammy Awards. The album was remastered and reissued in 2003 with three bonus tracks.

== Background and recording ==
Following the release of Fredriksson's previous album – Den sjunde vågen – in February 1986, she formed pop duo Roxette with Per Gessle, who released their first album – Pearls of Passion – later that same year. Both records were commercially successful in Sweden, with Fredriksson's album selling more than 90,000 copies, and Roxette's selling almost 200,000 copies. ... Efter stormen was recorded over two separate sessions at EMI Studios in May and September 1987. Recording was interrupted by Roxette's co-headlining concert tour with Eva Dahlgren and Ratata: "Rock runt riket" ("Rock Around the Kingdom"), which ran from July to August.

"Om du såg mej nu"
Despite never being released as a single, this song appeared on Fredriksson's greatest hits compilation, Äntligen (2000).

Gessle initially argued against Fredriksson returning to her solo work, saying that any solo album and resulting tour would negatively impact the duo's chances of achieving international success. Despite these objections, she returned to EMI Studios in September to finish recording ... Efter stormen, with Gessle using any excess studio time to record demos for Roxette's second album, Look Sharp!. (Note: Gessle, Clarence Öfwerman and several engineers would – with limited participation from Fredriksson – record Roxette demos at EMI Studio 1 while Fredriksson and Lasse Lindbom finalised ... Efter stormen using the mixing console at the adjoining EMI Studio 2. Roxette demos recorded in this manner include "Dressed for Success", "Sleeping Single", "Dangerous", "Never Is a Long Time", "Silver Blue", "One Is Such a Lonely Number" and "From Head to Toe".) ... Efter stormen was recorded with many of the same musicians who performed on Den sjunde vågen, although the record features sparser instrumentation than that release; songs are mainly rock and folk-based, and contain almost none of the synthesizer prevalent on her earlier work. The album's second track, "Om du såg mej nu" ("If You Saw Me Now"), was written by Fredriksson in dedication to her father, who died in 1981, prior to her achieving any form of commercial success as a recording artist.

== Release and reception ==
The album was preceded by the release of its only commercial single, "Efter stormen". The song became her first top ten hit in her home country, peaking at number seven on the Swedish Singles Chart, and at number two on the Swedish-language-songs-only Airplay Chart. The album was a commercial success upon release on 12 October 1987, debuting at number three on the Swedish Albums Chart before peaking at number one for two consecutive weeks. It sold over 50,000 copies within a month of release, and was promoted with a concert tour of Sweden, which ran for 33 sold-out performances between October and December. By the end of 1987, the album was certified platinum by the Swedish Recording Industry Association, denoting shipments of over 100,000 units. The record won Best Swedish Album at the 1987 Rockbjörnen awards, where Fredriksson was also awarded Best Swedish Female. At the beginning of 1988, "Bara för en dag" became a top ten hit on the Swedish Airplay Chart, and Fredriksson was nominated in the Pop/Rock—Female category at the 1988 Grammis Awards, the Swedish equivalent of the Grammy Awards.

== Formats and track listings ==
All songs written by Marie Fredriksson and Lasse Lindbom, except "Aldrig som främlingar" written by Ulf Schagerström.

... Efter stormen – LP/Cassette: Side A
No.	Title	English translation	Length
1.	"Längtan" (Intro)	"Longing"	1:41
2.	"Om du såg mej nu"	"If You Saw Me Now"	4:20
3.	"Efter stormen"	"After the Storm"	4:01
4.	"Kärlekens skuld"	"Love's Debt"	4:50
5.	"Aldrig som främlingar"	"Never Like Strangers"	4:54
6.	"Bara för en dag"	"Just for a Day"	4:41

... Efter stormen – LP/Cassette: Side B
No.	Title	English translation	Length
7.	"Längtan"		4:16
8.	"Låt mej andas"	"Let Me Breathe"	4:34
9.	"Kaffe och tårar"	"Coffee and Tears"	4:01
10.	"Även vargar måste välja"	"Even Wolves Must Choose"	2:45
11.	"När vindarna vänt"	"When the Winds Changed"	4:11
12.	"Jag brände din bild"	"I Burned Your Picture"	4:29
Total length:			48:43

... Efter stormen – 2003 reissue (bonus tracks)
No.	Title	English translation	Length
12.	"Jag brände din bild" / "Om du såg mej nu" (Orchestral Reprise) (hidden track)		6:21
13.	"Varmt och djupt"	"Warm and Deep"	4:33
14.	"Ut ur skuggan, in i solen"	"Out of the Shade, Into the Sun"	4:21
15.	"En stund"	"A While"	5:38
Total length:			1:05:07

== Personnel ==
Credits adapted from the liner notes of ... Efter stormen.

- Recorded at EMI Studios in Stockholm, Sweden in May and September 1987
- Mastered by Peter Dahl at Polar Mastering, Stockholm

Musicians

- Marie Fredriksson – vocals, lyricist, composition and piano
- Per Andersson – drums and programming
- Staffan Astner – electric guitars
- Richard "Ricky" Johansson – bass guitar and electric upright bass
- Leif Larson – keyboards

Technical personnel

- Kjell Andersson – sleeve design
- Denise Grünstein – photography
- Lars-Göran "Lasse" Lindbom – composition, production
- Alar Suurna – engineering

Additional musicians

- Andreas Alin – flute (track 5)
- Sara Aronson – horn (track 5)
- Jörgen Astner – mandolin (track 7)
- Tomas Gertonsson – contrabass (track 12)
- Erik Häusler – saxophone (track 9)
- Ingalill Hillerud – contrabass (track 12)
- Henrik Janson – wind and string arrangements (tracks 5 and 12)
- Ulf Janson – wind and string arrangements (tracks 5 and 12)
- Mårten Larsson – oboe (track 5)
- Elmér Lavotha – cello (tracks 5 and 12)
- Leif Lindvall – trumpet (track 12)
- Mikael Lundbald – violin (track 12)
- Thomas Lundbald – violin (track 12)
- Per Malmstedt – synthesizer (tracks 3, 9 and 11)
- Karl "Kalle" Moraeus – violin (track 12)
- Tove Naess – backing vocals (tracks 3, 6 and 8)
- Ki Rydberg – backing vocals (tracks 3, 6 and 8)
- Mikael Sjörgen – cello (tracks 5 and 12)
- Jan-Erik Skoglund – bassoon (track 5)
- Arne Stenlund – viola (track 12)
- Sten-Johan Sunding – viola (track 12)
- Anette Vistrand – violin (track 12)

== Charts and certifications ==
=== Weekly charts ===
Chart (1987)	Peak position
Swedish Albums (Sverigetopplistan)	1

=== Certifications ===
Region	Certification	Certified units/sales
Sweden (GLF)	Platinum	100,000^{^}
^{^} Shipments figures based on certification alone.

== Release history ==
Region	Date	Format	Label	Catalog #	Ref.
Sweden	12 October 1987	LP; Cassette; CD	EMI	7484572	
Sweden	June 2002	Remastered 24-bit HDCD: Kärlekens guld box set	Capitol Records	7243 5 40199-2 0	
Sweden	5 March 2003	CD	Capitol Records	—N/a	
