= Het vind =

Studio album by Marie Fredriksson
- Released: 20 September 1984
- Recorded: December 1983 – June 1984
- Studio: EMI Studios, Stockholm
- Genre: Pop rock; soft rock
- Length: 41:55
- Language: Swedish
- Label: EMI Svenska AB
- Producer: Lasse Lindbom

Marie Fredriksson chronology
Het vind (1984)	Den sjunde vågen (1986)

Singles from Het vind
- 1. "Ännu doftar kärlek" Released: 15 May 1984; 2. "Het vind" Released: 2 October 1984

Professional ratings
Review scores
Source	Rating
AllMusic	2/5 stars

Het vind (Hot Wind) is the debut studio album by Swedish singer-songwriter Marie Fredriksson, originally released on LP and Cassette formats on 20 September 1984 by EMI Sweden. The album was preceded by its lead single, "Ännu doftar kärlek" ("Still the Scent of Love"), and both that single and the album became top twenty hits in her native country.

The title track was released as the second and final single, although it failed to chart. This single was backed by a Swedish cover of Cyndi Lauper's "All Through the Night", which was translated by producer Lars-Göran "Lasse" Lindbom, and re-titled "Natt efter natt" ("Night After Night"). This song was included as a bonus track when the album was released on CD for the first time on 2 June 1987.

== Background and recording ==
The album was recorded with many of the same musicians who featured on Per Gessle's 1983 debut solo album, with whom Fredriksson would later form pop duo Roxette. Gessle composed two songs for the record: "Tag detta hjärta" ("Take This Heart") and "Rickie Lee", although the latter was not selected for inclusion. Gessle's own recording of the song subsequently appeared on his 1985 album Scener, and Fredriksson's version would remain unreleased until Het vind was remastered and reissued on CD in 2003.

Unlike the power pop of Fredriksson's previous band MaMas Barn (MaMas Children) – which she formed in the late 70's with her then-boyfriend Martin Sternhufvud, who also wrote one song for the album: "Jag ska ge allt" ("I'll Give Everything"), Het vind is a relatively contemporary record. The material differs from her previous band in that it has a more soft rock lean, and several songs feature arrangements indicative of Roxette's later hit power ballads, such as "Listen to Your Heart" and "Fading Like a Flower (Every Time You Leave)". A number of other songs contain elements of disco and 80s synth-pop.

== Formats and track listings ==
Het vind – Original LP/Cassette: Side A
No.	Title	Writer(s)	English translation	Length
1.	"Het vind"	Ulf Lundell	"Hot Wind"	5:30
2.	"Jag går min väg"	Marie Fredriksson; Lasse Lindbom	"I'm Going My Way"	3:52
3.	"Ännu doftar kärlek"	Fredriksson; Lindbom	"Still the Scent of Love"	3:48
4.	"(Du är en) Vinnare"	Lindbom	"(You Are a) Winner"	3:30
5.	"Det blåser en vind"	Lindbom	"A Wind Blows"	4:17

Het vind – Original LP/Cassette: Side B
No.	Title	Writer(s)	English translation	Length
6.	"Aldrig mer igen"	Magnus Lindberg; Bengt Palmers; Lindbom	"Never Again"	4:37
7.	"Tag detta hjärta"	Per Gessle; Lindbom	"Take This Heart"	4:08
8.	"Tusen ögon"	Fredriksson	"Thousand Eyes"	3:44
9.	"Vidare igen"	Fredriksson; Björn Holmgren	"Moving On Again"	3:25
10.	"Jag ska ge allt"	Martin Sternhufvud	"I Will Give Everything"	5:04
Total length:				41:55

Het vind – Original CD
No.	Title	Writer(s)	English translation	Length
11.	"Natt efter natt"	Jules Shear; Lindbom	"Night After Night"	4:17
Total length:				46:12

Het vind – 2003 reissue (bonus track)
No.	Title	Writer(s)	Length
12.	"Rickie Lee"	Gessle	2:28
Total length:			48:40

== Personnel ==
Credits adapted from the liner notes of Het vind.

- Marie Fredriksson – vocals, backing vocals and synthesizer
- Per "Pelle" Andersson – backing vocals and drums
- Backa Hans Eriksson – bass
- Jan "Nane" Kvillsäter – electric guitars
- Lars-Göran "Lasse" Lindbom – backing vocals, percussion, acoustic guitar and production
- Hans "Hasse" Olsson – keyboards
- Per "Pelle" Sirén – electric guitars
- Niklas Strömstedt – backing vocals

Technical personnel

- Björn Almstedt – mastering
- Kjell Andersson – sleeve design
- Calle Bengtsson – photography
- Björn Boström – engineering

== Charts ==
Chart (1984)	Peak position
Swedish Albums (Sverigetopplistan)	20

== Release history ==
Region	Date	Format	Label	Catalog #	Ref.
Sweden	20 September 1984	LP; Cassette	EMI	1361481 (LP); 1361484 (Cassette)	
Sweden	2 June 1987	CD	EMI	CDP-7467192	
Sweden	June 2002	Remastered 24-bit HDCD: Kärlekens guld box set	Capitol Records	7243 5 40199-2 0	
Sweden	5 March 2003	CD	Capitol Records	7243 5 39787-2 3	
