= Den sjunde vågen =

Studio album by Marie Fredriksson
- Released: 17 February 1986
- Recorded: June–September 1985
- Studio: EMI Studios, Stockholm
- Length: 42:50
- Language: Swedish
- Label: EMI Svenska AB
- Producer: Lasse Lindbom

Marie Fredriksson chronology
Het vind (1984)	Den sjunde vågen (1986)	... Efter stormen (1987)

Singles from Den sjunde vågen
- 1. "Den bästa dagen" Released: 4 October 1985; 2. "Silver i din hand" Released: 8 January 1986

Den sjunde vågen (The Seventh Wave) is the second studio album by Swedish singer-songwriter Marie Fredriksson, originally released on 17 February 1986 on LP and Cassette by EMI Sweden, with a CD release following on 29 October 1986. The album was a commercial success upon release, peaking at number six and spending almost three months on the Swedish Albums Chart. "Den bästa dagen" ("The Best Day") and "Silver i din hand" ("Silver in Your Hand") preceded the album as single releases: the b-sides from these singles served as bonus tracks when the record was later issued on CD.

The album was remastered and reissued in 2002 as part of Fredriksson's 24-bit HDCD box set, Kärlekens guld. This edition included Fredriksson's previously unreleased recording of "Det finns så mycket man inte känner till" ("There Is Much You Do Not Know") as a bonus track, a version of which had originally been released as a single in 1988 by Swedish pop singer Anna Book.

== Background and recording ==
Marie Fredriksson and her then-boyfriend, producer Lars-Göran "Lasse" Lindbom, wrote the majority of songs found on Den sjunde vågen while on vacation in the Canary Islands in the summer of 1985. During the vacation, Fredriksson finished reading Henri Charrière's autobiographical novel Papillon, the plot of which inspired the album's title; the book describes how Charrière observed that waves "come in a series of seven – the last being the biggest and the strongest." The couple returned to Sweden to record the album at EMI Studios in Stockholm between June and September 1985. It was recorded with a predominantly new group of musicians; many of the people who performed on her 1984 debut solo album, Het vind, also performed on Per Gessle's debut solo album. Fredriksson and Gessle would go on to form pop duo Roxette in 1986.

== Release and reception ==
The album was preceded by the release of two singles in Sweden: "Den bästa dagen" on 4 October 1985 and "Silver i din hand" on 8 January 1986, both of which failed to chart. Despite this, the album was an immediate commercial success upon release, spending over three months on the Swedish Album Chart, where it peaked at number six on its third week. Upon release, multiple Swedish journalists commented that Den sjunde vågen was "just another divorce album", as Fredriksson and Lindbom ended their romantic relationship partway through its recording. However, Fredriksson denied this, saying that only one song on the album, "När du såg på mej" ("When You Looked At Me") – which features Lindbom as a co-lead vocalist – relates to the disintegration of their relationship.

"Mot okända hav"
Despite never being released as a commercial single, this song has appeared on two of Fredriksson's compilation albums: Äntligen (2000) and Tid för tystnad (2007).

The record was promoted by Fredriksson's second solo tour, which began on 28 February 1986 and was initially scheduled to run until 30 April, although it was eventually extended until the end of May due to high ticket sales. Over the course of the tour, two songs from the album – the title track and "Mot okända hav" ("Toward Unknown Seas") – became top ten hits on Svensktoppen, Sweden's airplay-based chart. In July, she was a featured performer on the inaugural edition of the "Badrock Tour". This two-week festival was founded by former Blue Swede vocalist Björn Skifs, and took place at the Borgholm Castle ruin on the Swedish Baltic Sea island of Öland. Roxette's debut studio album, Pearls of Passion, was released on 31 October 1986; two days earlier, Den sjunde vågen was issued on CD for the first time, containing b-sides from the two commercial singles as bonus tracks. The success of the album in her home country led to Fredriksson winning her first Rockbjörnen award in 1986, for Best Swedish Female. She would go on to win the award a total of four times: the most of any artist in the awards' history.

== Formats and track listings ==
All songs written by Marie Fredriksson and Lasse Lindbom, except where noted.

Den sjunde vågen – Original LP/Cassette: Side A
No.	Title	Writer(s)	English translation	Length
1.	"Värdighet"		"Dignity"	3:51
2.	"För dom som älskar"	Ulf Lundell	"For Those Who Love"	6:11
3.	"Silver i din hand"		"Silver in Your Hand"	3:14
4.	"När du såg på mej" (with Lasse Lindbom)		"When You Looked At Me"	4:55
5.	"Mot okända hav"	Ulf Schagerström	"Toward Unknown Seas"	3:54

Den sjunde vågen – Original LP/Cassette: Side B
No.	Title	Writer(s)	English translation	Length
6.	"Den bästa dagen"	Fredriksson; Lindbom; Niklas Strömstedt	"The Best Day"	5:12
7.	"Tro på mej"		"Believe in Me"	3:42
8.	"En känsla av regn"	Lindbom; Strömstedt	"A Sense of Rain"	4:02
9.	"Den sjunde vågen"		"The Seventh Wave"	6:06
10.	"Ett hus vid havet"		"A House By the Sea"	1:43
Total length:				42:50

Den sjunde vågen – Original CD
No.	Title	Writer(s)	English translation	Length
11.	"Helig man"		"Holy Man"	4:03
12.	"Skyll på mej"	Per Andersson	"Blame on Me"	4:58
Total length:				52:08

Den sjunde vågen – 2003 reissue (bonus track)
No.	Title	English translation	Length
13.	"Det finns så mycket man inte känner till"	"There Is Much You Do Not Know"	3:32
Total length:			55:40

== Personnel ==
Credits adapted from the liner notes of Den sjunde vågen.

Musicians

- Marie Fredriksson – vocals and recorder
- Per Andersson – backing vocals, synthesizer and drums
- Staffan Astner – guitars
- Richard "Ricky" Johansson – bass guitar and electric upright bass
- Leif Larson – piano, keyboards and synthesizer
- Lars-Göran "Lasse" Lindbom – lead vocals (track 4), backing vocals, acoustic guitar, engineering and production

Additional musicians

- Marianne Flynner – backing vocals (track 6)
- Henrik Janson – guitar and synthesizer (track 7)
- Jan "Nane" Kvillsäter – electric (track 1) and acoustic guitars (track 9)
- Tove Naess – backing vocals (track 6)
- Tommy Nilsson – backing vocals (track 6)
- Mikael Rickfors – backing vocals (track 6)
- Reg Ward – saxophone (track 2)
- Basse Wickman – backing vocals (track 6)

Technical personnel

- Kjell Andersson – sleeve design
- Calle Bengtsson – photography
- Björn Boström – engineering

== Charts and certifications ==
=== Weekly charts ===
Chart (1986)	Peak position
Swedish Albums (Sverigetopplistan)	6

=== Certifications ===
 }

Region	Certification	Certified units/sales
Sweden (GLF)	Platinum	100,000^{^}
^{^} Shipments figures based on certification alone.

== Release history ==
Region	Date	Format	Label	Catalog #	Ref.
Sweden	17 February 1986	LP; Cassette	EMI	1361961 (LP); 1361964 (Cassette)	
Sweden	29 October 1986	CD	EMI	CDP–7463052	
Sweden	June 2002	Remastered 24-bit HDCD: Kärlekens guld box set	Capitol Records	7243 5 40199–2 0	
Sweden	5 March 2003	CD	Capitol Records	7243 5 39869–2 6	
