= Helsingborgs Dagblad =

Swedish newspaper from Helsingborg

Helsingborgs Dagblad

Helsingborgs Dagblad (HD, lit. "Helsingborg's Daily Paper"), published in Helsingborg in Skåne is the largest (circ. 84,000) newspaper in Swedish outside the metropolitan cities of Malmö, Gothenburg and Stockholm.

== History and profile ==
The newspaper was founded with the name of Helsingborgs Tidning on 1 October 1867. It began to use its current name, Helsingborgs Dagblad, in 1884. The paper has its headquarters in Helsingborg.

During its initial period Helsingborgs Tidning was a moderate publication. However, during World War II the paper had a pro-German, anti-communist and nationalistic political stance, but it did not adopt a pro-Nazi approach.

In January 2001, the newspaper merged with Nordvästra Skånes Tidningar and is today published in three different local editions with separate names. In 2006, the paper changed its format from traditional broadsheet to tabloid following a general trend among daily newspapers.

In 2000 Helsingborgs Dagblad was, as the first Swedish newspaper ever, named The World's Best-Designed Newspaper by the international organization Society of News Design. In 2012 it was named as Sweden's best newspaper. In 2013 the paper and the Danish local paper Helsingør Dagblad initiated a cooperation to share their sources, but the project was ended soon due to the financial problems.

On 23 April 2014, Sydsvenskan acknowledged that they wanted to buy HD. A strong reason was reported to be that both newspapers had seen their ad revenue decrease heavily. They reached a deal in the end of May and the Swedish Competition Authority approved it around two weeks after. While Sydsvenskan has a soft paywall, it is not yet decided if HD will also have one.
