= Tro (song) =

Single by Marie Fredriksson

from the album I en tid som vår
- B-side: "Tid för försoning"
- Released: 11 October 1996
- Studio: Studio Vinden, Djursholm
- Genre: Alternative rock
- Length: 4:48
- Label: EMI Svenska AB
- Songwriter: Marie Fredriksson
- Producers: Fredriksson; Mikael Bolyos

Marie Fredriksson singles chronology
"Mellan sommar och höst" (1993)	"Tro" (1996)	"I en tid som vår" (1996)

"Tro" ("Faith") is an alternative rock song written by Swedish singer-songwriter Marie Fredriksson, released on 11 October 1996 by EMI as the first and only commercial single from her fifth studio album, I en tid som vår (1996). The song is about belief, although the lyric does not reference religion. The track was featured as the theme music to Colin Nutley's film Sånt är livet (English: This Is Life), who also directed its music video.

The song peaked at number eight and spent 29 weeks on the Swedish Singles Chart, making it the longest-charting single of her entire career, including her work as part of Roxette. It also performed well on Swedish radio, peaking at number eight on the Swedish Airplay Chart and at number twelve on Sveriges Radio's "Tracks" chart. In a 2018 online poll of Roxette fans, "Tro" was dubbed the fifth best song of Fredriksson's entire solo discography.

== Track listing ==
All songs written by Marie Fredriksson.

- CD single (EMI 8652692)
1. "Tro" – 4:48
2. "Tid för försoning" – 4:13

== Credits and personnel ==
Credits adapted from the liner notes of the CD single.

Musicians

- Marie Fredriksson – lead and background vocals, lyrics, composition, musical arrangement and production
- Mikael Bolyos – keyboards, engineering and production
- Staffan Astner – guitar
- Mats Kiesel – choir vocal arrangement and conducting
- Nicki Wallin – drums
- Nacka Musikklasser (Nacka Music Classes) and Nacka Musikskolas (Nacka Music School) – choir

Technical

- Kjell Andersson – sleeve design
- Mattias Edwall – photography
- Anders Hägglöv – choir recording and engineering (at Studio 2, Sveriges Radio)
- Alar Suurna – mixing

== Charts ==
=== Weekly charts ===
Chart (1996)	Peak position
Sweden (Sverigetopplistan)	8

=== Year-end charts ===
Chart (1996)	Position
Sweden (Topplistan)	45

== Covers ==
Swedish pop singer Shirley Clamp included her version of the track on her 2006 covers album Favoriter på svenska. She said of the song: "I can't find words to describe how beautiful it is", and said its lyric took on a deeper meaning after she was asked to perform the song at a funeral.
