= IMRSV Studios =

Recording studio in Stockholm, Sweden

Coordinates: 59°17′45.17″N 18°5′25.33″E

- Formerly: EMI Studios, Cosmos Studios, X-Level Studios, Baggpipe Studios
- Type: Recording studio
- Industry: Music
- Founded: 1969; 57 years ago
- Founder: EMI
- Headquarters: Palandergatan, Skärmarbrink, Stockholm, Sweden
- Owner: IMRSV
- Website: imrsv.music

IMRSV Studios, formerly EMI Studios, Cosmos Studios, X-Level Studios and Baggpipe Studios, is a recording studio complex at Skärmarbrink in southern Stockholm, Sweden. The record company EMI opened it in 1969 in a former cinema. Anni-Frid Lyngstad recorded her first solo album there before ABBA was formed. A plan to demolish the building was halted in 2021, and the music company IMRSV took over the studio around the same time.

== History ==
=== EMI Studios (1969–2000) ===
The building dates from 1939 and originally housed a 460-seat cinema, Kaza, which closed in 1965. EMI converted the cinema into a recording studio that opened in 1969. According to the studio's engineer Willem Bleeker it was meant to be a counterpart to Abbey Road Studios in London, and Sound on Sound describes it as modelled on Abbey Road's Studio 2.

Before ABBA was formed, Anni-Frid Lyngstad recorded her debut album Frida (1971) at the studio with Benny Andersson as producer, followed by the singles "Min egen stad" (1971) and "Vi är alla bara barn i början" (1972). Agnetha Fältskog, Björn Ulvaeus and Andersson sang backing vocals on both singles. The Stockholm newspaper Mitt i credits the studio with five of the seven Swedish singles that have reached number one in the United States, among them Blue Swede's "Hooked on a Feeling".

=== Cosmos, X-Level and Baggpipe (2000–2021) ===
Around 2000 the studio became Cosmos Studios. In 2012 its owner, Kent Isaacs, sold it to the music company X-Level Media Group, and it was renamed X-Level Studios. By 2017 it was operating as Baggpipe Studios, in partnership with the songwriter and producer Anders Bagge.

In 2019 the property owner proposed demolishing the building and replacing it with a taller block of flats. Thousands of people signed a petition against the plan, and in December 2021 the City of Stockholm halted the process. In 2024 the owner said that the building would not be demolished.

=== IMRSV Studios (2021–present) ===
Around 2021 the studio was taken over by IMRSV. The company, started by David Stenmarck, a co-founder of Epidemic Sound, is a label and publisher that also runs thirteen studios, four of them equipped for Dolby Atmos. The Stockholm Studio Orchestra, led by the string arranger Erik Arvinder, has the studio as its home base.

== See also ==
- Atlantis Studios and Polar Studios, two other Stockholm studios in former cinemas
