= A Family Affair (Mikael Bolyos album) =

Studio album by Mikael Bolyos featuring Marie Fredriksson and Mats Ronander
- Released: 14 June 2007
- Studio: Studio Vinden, Djursholm; Polar and Kingside Studios, Stockholm
- Genre: Pop; soul; blues
- Length: 39:55
- Label: Mikael Bolyos Music AB; EMI
- Producer: Mikael Bolyos

Singles from A Family Affair
- 1. "When the Lord Is About to Come" Released: 5 April 2007; 2. "Me & My Guitar" Released: 25 May 2007

A Family Affair is the debut studio album by Swedish singer-songwriter Mikael Bolyos. The album was issued on CD on 14 June 2007 by EMI, in conjunction with Bolyos' own independent record label Mikael Bolyos Music. It features the vocals of Bolyos' wife Marie Fredriksson (part of the duo Roxette), and Mats Ronander. The record received mixed reviews upon release, and failed to appear on the Swedish Albums Chart. "When the Lord Is About to Come" and "Me & My Guitar" were released as singles.

== Critical reception ==
Professional ratings
Review scores
Source	Rating
Borås Tidning	2/5 stars
Expressen	1/5 stars

Håkan Persson of Borås Tidning said: "Mikael Bolyos has more or less chosen to stand in the shadow of his better half, Marie Fredriksson. He makes sixties-coloured drudgery and throw-away-pop, and his wife – who sings lead and choir – tries to take up as little space as possible. Quite frankly, there's nothing else to say [about the album]." A writer for Expressen commented on the album leaking several months before its release date: "The record company in crisis wants to blame the pirates. Come on. Isn't the real crisis that the album simply doesn't hold up? Who wants to hear Steely Dan with a singer who sucks? Or Roxette without real songs? Probably no one. With the help of extremely competent people, including his wife Marie Fredriksson and Mats Ronander, Micke Bolyos has recorded an album that not even the kindest of free listeners will waste hard disk space on."

== Track listing ==
All lyrics are written by Mikael Bolyos, except where noted; all music is composed by Bolyos

No.	Title	Lyrics	Lead vocals	Length
1.	"Merry Go Round"	Roy Colegate	Bolyos	4:14
2.	"On & On & On"		Bolyos	4:23
3.	"Me & My Guitar"		Bolyos	2:55
4.	"When the Lord Is About to Come"		Bolyos; Mats Ronander	4:00
5.	"In the Corner of Your Eye"	Colegate	Marie Fredriksson	4:04
6.	"Lilly"		Bolyos	3:40
7.	"Tell It to My Heart"		Fredriksson	4:10
8.	"You're on My Mind"	Mats Ronander	Ronander	3:28
9.	"What Am I Supposed to Do?"		Bolyos	3:33
10.	"Outro"		Fredriksson	0:57
11.	"Hometown"	Bolyos; Colegate	Fredriksson	4:25
Total length:				39:55

== Credits and personnel ==
Credits adapted from the liner notes of A Family Affair.

- Mikael Bolyos – lead vocals, background vocals, instrumentation, production and mixing
- By Grace – choir (tracks 4 and 10)
- Marie Fredriksson – lead vocals, background vocals (tracks 1, 2, 3, 6 and 8)
- Lennart Östlund – mixing (Polar Studios)
- Mats Ronander – lead vocals, harmonica
- Alar Suurna – mixing (Studio Vinden)
