= List of Melodifestivalen contestants =

This article lists the artists that have participated in Melodifestivalen five times or more, and their victories where applicable.

The person with the most Melodifestivalen entries is songwriter Thomas G:son, who has entered 61 songs between 1999 and 2020. Behind G:son is Bobby Ljunggren with 50 entries, and further back are Ingela "Pling" Forsman (39 songs), Henrik Wikström (34 songs) and Fredrik Kempe with 33 entries.

Bobby Ljunggren and Lasse Holm have the most Melodifestivalen wins, with five each. Åke Gerhard, Fredrik Kempe and Thomas G:son have a total of four victories. Carola Häggkvist, Ingela "Pling" Forsman and Marie Bergman have had three wins each. The person with the most appearances without a victory is Ann-Louise Hanson who entered unsuccessfully thirteen times between 1963 and 2020.

Normal text shows singers, and italics show songwriters. From ESC.info.se

No. of appearances	Name	No. of victories
61	Thomas G:son	4 (2001, 2006, 2012, 2023)
50	Bobby Ljunggren	5 (1995, 1998, 2006, 2008, 2010)
39	Ingela "Pling" Forsman	3 (1985, 1995, 1998)
34	Henrik Wikström	1 (2006)
33	Fredrik Kempe	4 (2008, 2009, 2011, 2014)
20	Peter Boström	2 (2012, 2023)
19	Tim Larsson	1 (2005)
19	Tobias Lundgren	1 (2005)
18	Johan Fransson	1 (2005)
18	Lasse Holm	5 (1982, 1983, 1985, 1986, 1993)
16	Anton Hård af Segerstad	1 (2015)
15	Linnea Deb	2 (2013, 2015)
14	Joy Deb	2 (2013, 2015)
14	Peter Himmelstrand	2 (1968, 1978)
13	Anderz Wrethov	2 (2019, 2021)
13	Calle Kindbom	1 (2003)
13	Marcos Ubeda	1 (2002)
13	Ann-Louise Hanson	0
13	Torgny Söderberg	1 (1984)
13	Östen Warnerbring	2 (1960, 1967)
12	Tony Nilsson	0
12	Larry Forsberg	0
12	Lennart Wastesson	0
12	Sven-Inge Sjöberg	0
12	Alexander Bard	1 (1989)
12	Lars "Dille" Diedricson	1 (1999)
12	Niklas Edberger	1 (2005)
12	Britt Lindeborg	2 (1969, 1984)
12	Monica Forsberg	2 (1982, 1983)
11	Jimmy Jansson	1 (2023)
11	Åke Gerhard	4 (1958, 1959, 1960, 1962)
10	David Kreuger	1 (2014, 2017)
10	Kikki Danielsson	2 (1982, 1985)
10	Danne Attlerud	0
10	Peter Kvint	0
10	Anders Glenmark	0
10	Nanne Grönvall	1 (1996)
10	Stephan Berg	2 (1991, 1997)
9	Lina Eriksson	0
9	Aleena Gibson	0
9	Andreas Lundstedt	0
9	Sylvia Vrethammar	0
9	Anders Hansson	0
9	Bobbie Ericsson	2 (1961, 1963)
9	Peter Grönvall	1 (1996)
9	Staffan Ehrling	0
8	Sharon Vaughn	0
8	Amir Aly	0
8	Magnus Carlsson	0
8	Marie Bergman	3 (1971, 1972, 1994)
8	Mårten Eriksson	0
8	Ola Håkansson	1 (1989)
8	Anders Dannvik	0
8	Berndt Öst	2 (1971, 1972)
8	Bo-Göran Edling	0
8	Svante Thuresson	1 (1966)
8	Tomas Ledin	1 (1980)
8	Tommy Körberg	2 (1969, 1988)
7	Jessica Andersson	1 (2003)
7	Arvingarna	1 (1993)
7	Hamed Pirouzpanah	1 (2014, 2017)
7	Karl-Ola Kjellholm	0
7	Andreas Johnson	0
7	Sanna Nielsen	1 (2014)
7	Fredrik "Figge" Boström	0
7	Karl Eurén	0
7	Mattias Reimer	0
7	Lars Edvall	0
7	Gunnar Wiklund	0
7	Mikael Wendt	2 (1987, 1990)
7	Per Andreasson	0
7	Pierre Isacsson	2 (1971, 1972)
7	Tommy Lydell	0
6	Martin Klaman	0
6	Linda Bengtzing	0
6	Henrik Janson	0
6	Shirley Clamp	0
6	Pontus Assarsson	0
6	Henrik Sethsson	1 (2001)
6	Elisabeth Andreassen	1 (1982)
6	Tim Norell	1 (1989)
6	Py Bäckman	1 (1988)
6	Agnetha Munther	2 (1971, 1982)
6	Bruno Glenmark	0
6	Carli Tornehave	0
6	Christer Lundh	1 (1987)
6	Family Four	2 (1971, 1972)
6	Håkan Almqvist	2 (1995, 1998)
6	Ingvar Wixell	1 (1965)
6	Kenneth Gärdestad	1 (1979)
6	Lars Lönndahl	0
6	Lasse Berghagen	1 (1975)
6	Lena Philipsson	1 (2004)
6	Lily Berglund	0
6	Lotta Ahlin	0
5	Alcazar	0
5	Sonja Aldén	0
5	Thomas Thörnholm	0
5	Carola Häggkvist	3 (1983, 1991, 2006)
5	Bengt-Arne Wallin	1 (1966)
5	Benny Andersson	1 (1974)
5	Danny Saucedo	0
5	Gert Lengstrand	2 (1993, 1999)
5	Gustaf Eurén	0
5	Göran Fristorp	1 (1973)
5	Inger Berggren	1 (1962)
5	Jan Johansen	1 (1995)
5	Karin Glenmark	0
5	Lars Andersson	0
5	Lisa Ajax	0
5	Marcus Österdahl	1 (1967)
5	Mariette	0
5	Mona Grain	0
5	Nick Borgen	0
5	Patrice Hellberg	1 (1967)
5	Siw Malmkvist	2 (1959, 1961)
5	Svante Persson	0
5	Ted Gärdestad	1 (1979)
