= Just Like That (Gemini song) =

Single by Gemini

from the album Gemini
- B-side: "Live On the Love"
- Released: 10 March 1986
- Recorded: 1985
- Length: 3:44
- Label: Polydor
- Songwriters: Benny Andersson; Björn Ulvaeus
- Producers: Benny Andersson; Anders Glenmark; Björn Ulvaeus

Gemini singles chronology
| "Slow Emotion" (1985) | "Just Like That" (1986) | "Another You Another Me" (1986) |

"Just Like That" is a song written by ABBA members Benny Andersson and Björn Ulvaeus. The song was originally recorded in 1982 by the group, and went unreleased. It would later be officially recorded and released by the Swedish sibling duo Gemini, made up of Karin and Anders Glenmark. Gemini's version was produced by Andersson, Ulvaeus, and Anders Glenmark. It was released on 10 March 1986, and was included on their self-titled debut album (1985). Gemini's version is heavily rewritten compared to ABBA's version, with a slower arrangement and completely different verses. Gemini would gain minor success with this cover.

== ABBA version ==
The ABBA version has never been released officially. Recorded in 1982, as a track for a forthcoming ABBA album, Benny and Björn decided something was inherently 'wrong' with the track (verse and melody did not match), and the track was discarded. When the album plans were cancelled in 1982, it was decided instead to release a compilation with two new singles. The new tracks on The Singles turned out to be "The Day Before You Came" and "Under Attack", while "Just Like That" didn't even become a B-side.

Three demo versions of the ABBA recording have appeared on many bootleg records nevertheless, all originating from cassettes that were stolen from Björn's car in Stockholm around 1983. The three demos have been nicknamed the 'slow', 'na-na-na' and 'saxophone' versions. A snippet of one of the demos was made available in the "ABBA Undeleted" medley of unreleased tracks, included on the Thank You for the Music box set, released in 1994. Another unreleased track from the 1982 sessions, which was also included on the stolen cassettes, "I Am the City", was released in 1993 on More ABBA Gold.

Back in the 1980s, typical to how Benny and Björn worked, parts of the unreleased "Just Like That" were recycled for better use. A guitar solo/riff appeared as a melody line in "Under Attack", ABBA's last single, already in late 1982.

A more comprehensive solution to "Just Like That" came in separating the song parts Benny and Björn felt did not belong together, and in slowing down the tempo considerably. The song first re-emerged as a demo for Chess, the Andersson-Rice-Ulvaeus musical, only a year or two after the discarded ABBA version, rearranged as a dramatic instrumental ballad and discarding the original chorus melody. The song, now titled "When the Waves Roll Out to Sea", didn't progress further in the production, however.

The original ABBA version of "Just Like That" was originally intended to be featured in the ABBA musical, Mamma Mia!, sung as a love duet between Sophie and Sky, but was discarded during rehearsals, as the song apparently did not advance the story.

Finally, the discarded verse melody found its home in "Glöm Mig Om Du Kan", a version not far removed from "When the Waves Roll Out to Sea", now with vocals by Per Myrberg, released on the Swedish version of the Chess musical in 2002, Chess på Svenska.

== Gemini version ==
In 1985, a new version of "Just Like That", which this time kept the original chorus but discarded the original verses, was released by Gemini on their first album. The song was released as a single in March 1986 to modest success in Europe. Gemini performed the song live in the UK (with Benny playing the synthesizer) on Terry Wogan's chat show. It became a minor hit there, peaking at number 79.

=== Critical reception ===
Eurotipsheet responded favorably to the song saying it has "crystal-clear vocals, an easy and very comfortable production with a sense of sophistication that is hard to match. A formula top 40 song."

== Charts ==
Weekly chart performance for "Just Like That"
| Chart (1986) | Peak position |
|---|---|
| UK (UK Singles Chart) | 79 |
| Belgium | 30 |
| Netherlands | 24 |
