= Mio min Mio =

The Swedish Mio min Mio, or its English translation, Mio, My Mio, may refer to:

- Mio, My Son, a 1954 children's book by Swedish author Astrid Lindgren
- Mio in the Land of Faraway a 1987 film based on the book
- "Mio My Mio" (song), a song by Swedish group Gemini from the soundtrack of the film
