= Dana Dragomir =

Swedish musician

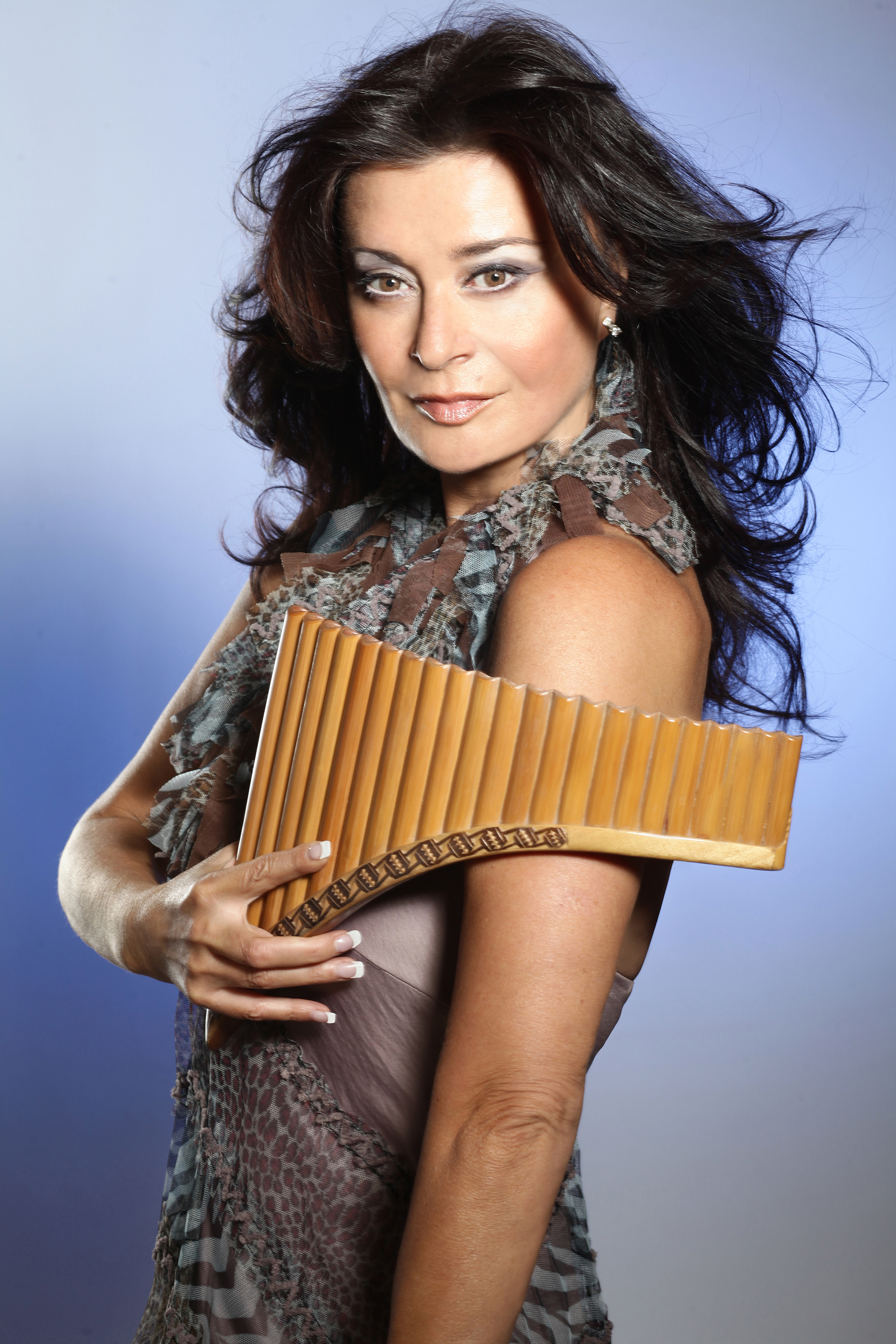

Background information
- Also known as: Pandana
- Born: 22 July 1964 (age 62); Bucharest, Romania
- Origin: Romania
- Genres: Popular music, instrumental pop, easy listening
- Occupations: Musician, composer
- Instrument: Pan flute
- Years active: 1980–present
- Label: Pandana Records
- Website: danadragomir.com

Dana Dragomir (Romanian pronunciation: [ˈdana draɡoˈmir]; born 22 July 1964) is a Swedish pan flute musician and composer of Romanian origin. She is also known under the name Pandana (combination between the Greek god Pan and her name).

Dana Dragomir is best known for her interpretation of the song "Mio My Mio", written by Benny Andersson and Björn Ulvaeus of ABBA. She is the first professional female Pan flute player in the world. Her music is a mixture of Pop, World and New-age music. She achieved chart success in Sweden with several of her albums, being quoted the best selling instrumental artist in Scandinavia and she is the first instrumental artist ever to top the Swedish radio record chart, Svensktoppen.

== Biography ==
Dragomir has a twelve-year education at the prestigious Dinu Lipatti and George Enescu High School of Music in Bucharest, her place of birth. She was discovered and became an established star at the age of sixteen in her native country.

In 1985, aged 21, she left Romania for a three-year contract in Las Vegas, her manager then having big plans for her in the USA. These were the last years of the Ceaușescu era, and the Securitate let her leave the country only on condition that she would spy for them. But Dragomir had no intention to ever come back to Romania. Her defection had dear consequences for her parents, who both lost their jobs. She eventually went back to Romania for the first time in 1990, after the fall of Ceaușescu.

Meanwhile, she had quickly grown dissastified with the slow developing project in the US, and finally left the country and her manager to settle in Sweden. Her big breakthrough there came in 1991 with her rendition of "Mio min Mio", a song initially composed for the 1987 film Mio in the Land of Faraway by the two former ABBA members Benny Andersson and Björn Ulvaeus. Her instrumental version became a huge success and stayed in the Svensktoppen chart for ten weeks, peaking at number 1.

She was married to Klas Burling, a radio and TV personality best known for inviting and bringing the Beatles to Sweden in 1963. Burling also acts as her manager. They live in Stockholm's Östermalm neighborhood and together they have a daughter, Alexandra Burling, born 16 August 1994. Klas died 19 February 2023.

== Discography ==
=== Albums ===
| Year | Album | Peak chart positions | | | Certifications (SWE) |
| Year | Album | SWE | NOR | DEN | Certifications (SWE) |
|---|---|---|---|---|---|
| 1987 | Från Orup till Bellman with Merit Hemmingson | — | — | — | |
| 1989 | Merry Christmas with Merit Hemmingson | — | — | — | |
| 1991 | Fluty Romances | 26 | — | — | Gold |
| 1992 | Demiro | 28 | — | — | Gold |
| 1994 | Samling | — | — | — | |
| 1995 | Panflöjts favoriter (with Gheorghe Zamfir) | 21 | — | — | |
| 1996 | Pandana published by EMI Electrola | 41 | — | — | |
| 1997 | Traditional | — | — | — | |
| 1999 | Favoriter | — | — | — | |
| 2000 | Pan Is Alive And Well | 40 | — | — | |
| 2007 | Älskade Svenska visor | 22 | — | — | |
| 2011 | The best of me | 20 | — | — | |
| 2014 | Frost | — | — | — | |

"—" denotes releases that did not chart or unknown.

== Own compositions ==
Dana Dragomir is not only playing cover songs, but she also composed own songs (often together with musicians like Per Andreasson, Amadin, Peter Grönvall and Renate Cumerfield.)

=== Own compositions ===
1992 into The Light (From the album Demiro)

=== Music composed with other musicians ===
- 1991 The Song of Iancu Jianu with Per Andreasson (From the album Fluty Romances)
- 1991 Cries of Beirut with Per Andreasson (From the album Fluty Romances)
- 1991 Firutza with Per Andreasson (From the album Fluty Romances)
- 1991 Ah, IA zein with Per Andreasson (From the album Fluty Romances)
- 1995 Marmarooni with Renate Cumerfield (From single Pandana is Dana Dragomir)
- 1995 December 7 with Amadin at Cheiron Studios (From the album Pandana)
- 1995 Ote'ae with R. Cumerfield (From the album Pandana)
- 1995 Whispering Waves with Per Magnusson at Cheiron Studios (From the album Pandana)
- 1995 Seven Valleys at Cheiron Studios (From the album Pandana)
- 1995 Rich and Poor (From the album Pandana)
- 1995 Imagination with Jonas Berggren
- 1995 One man woman with Amadin at Cheiron Studios (From the album Pandana)
- 1999 Pan is alive with Peter Grönvall (From the album Pan is alive and well)
- 1999 Salomeia with Peter Grönvall (From the album Pan is alive and well)
- 1999 Complaint with Peter Grönvall (From the album Pan is alive and well)

== Awards and nominations ==
- Swedish Grammis Awards nomination in 1990 with Merit Hemmingson
