= Glenmark (surname) =

Glenmark is a surname. Notable people with the surname include:

- Anders Glenmark (born 1953), Swedish singer, songwriter, musician, and record producer
- Bruno Glenmark (born 1938), Swedish musician, songwriter, band leader, and singer
- Karin Glenmark (1952–2025), Swedish pop and rock singer
