= Efter stormen (song) =

Single by Marie Fredriksson

from the album ... Efter stormen
- B-side: "Varmt och djupt"
- Released: 21 September 1987
- Studio: EMI Studios, Stockholm
- Genre: Pop rock
- Length: 4:01
- Label: EMI
- Songwriters: Fredriksson; Lasse Lindbom
- Producer: Lindbom

Marie Fredriksson singles chronology
"Silver i din hand" (1986)	"Efter stormen" (1987)	"Sparvöga" (1989)

"Efter stormen" ("After the Storm") is a pop rock song written by Swedish singer-songwriter Marie Fredriksson and Record producer Lars-Göran "Lasse" Lindbom, released as the first and only commercial single from Fredriksson's third studio album, ... Efter stormen (1987). The song was issued on 7" vinyl exclusively in Sweden on 21 September 1987, with "Varmt och djupt" ("Warm and Deep") as its b-side, which would otherwise remain unreleased until the album was reissued on CD in 2002. A 12" vinyl edition of the single – limited to 330 copies and containing the same tracks as the 7" release – was also issued.

The song was commercially successful in her native country upon release, peaking at number seven and spending six weeks on the Swedish Singles Chart. Additionally, the song spent eighteen weeks on the Swedish Airplay Chart, peaking at number two for 5 consecutive weeks; it was held off the top spot every week by Gemini's "Mio min mio". The song also peaked at number four on Sveriges Radio's "Tracks" chart. In a 2018 online poll of Roxette fans, "Efter stormen" was dubbed the best song of Fredriksson's entire discography as a solo artist.

== Track listing ==
All songs written by Marie Fredriksson and Lasse Lindbom.

- 7" single (EMI 1362857)
1. "Efter stormen" – 4:01
2. "Varmt och djupt" – 4:33

== Credits and personnel ==
Credits adapted from the liner notes of the original vinyl single.

Musicians

- Marie Fredriksson – vocals
- Per "Pelle" Andersson – drums
- Staffan Astner – electric guitars
- Richard "Ricky" Johansson – bass guitar
- Leif Larson – keyboards
- Per Malmstedt – keyboards and synthesizer
- Tove Naess – backing vocals
- Ki Rydberg – backing vocals

Technical personnel

- Peter Dahl – mastering (Polar Mastering, Stockholm)
- Kjell Andersson – sleeve design
- Denise Grünstein – photography
- Alar Suurna – engineering

== Charts ==
Chart (1987)	Peak position
Sweden (Sverigetopplistan)	7
