= Gemini (Gemini album) =

1985 Gemini studio album

Studio album by Gemini
- Released: 1985
- Genre: Pop
- Label: Polydor; Polar
- Producer: Benny Andersson; Björn Ulvaeus; Anders Glenmark

Gemini chronology
Gemini (1985)	Geminism (1987)

Singles from Gemini
- 1. "Another You, Another Me" / "Slowly" Released: 1985

Gemini is an album by Gemini released in 1985. Produced by Benny Andersson, Björn Ulvaeus and Anders Glenmark, the album features songwriting contributions from Andersson, Ulvaeus, Glenmark and Ingela Forsman. The album peaked at No. 9 on Sverigetopplistan in November 1985.

Two songs were of particular interest to ABBA fans: "Slowly", a song written by Benny Andersson and Björn Ulvaeus, was previously recorded by ABBA's Anni-Frid "Frida" Lyngstad and the unreleased ABBA song "Just Like That" was re-written and included on this LP. Benny Andersson and Björn Ulvaeus contend that the inclusion of this new version of "Just Like That" means that the ABBA version cannot be released, saying that there can't be two official versions of a song with the same title that are so similar and yet so different.

== Track listing ==
All songs written by Benny Andersson and Björn Ulvaeus except where indicated.

1. "Slowly" – 4:26
2. "Too Much Love Is Wasted" – 3:28
3. "Slow Emotion" – 4:12
4. "Just Like That" – 3:45
5. "Falling" (Anders Glenmark/Ingela Forsman) – 4:18
6. "Have Mercy" – 4:20
7. "Live on the Love" (Anders Glenmark/Björn Ulvaeus) – 4:17
8. "In the Middle of Nowhere" (Anders Glenmark/Ingela Forsman) – 4:35
9. "Another You, Another Me" – 4:10

Associated recordings:

10. "Copy Love" - 4:02
11. "When I Close My Eyes" - 3:44
12. "Slow Emotion (Extended Version)" - 5:14
13. "Den som sa det var det" (Swedish Version "Too Much Love Is Wasted") - 3:46
14. "Copy Love (2005 Remix)" - 4:02

Recorded during sessions for the Gemini album, parts of the tune of 'When I Close My Eyes' ultimately found their way into the Andersson/Rice/Ulvaeus musical Chess (in the London production's finale, in the Broadway production's song "Lullaby (Apukád erős kezén)", and throughout the Swedish production). Gemini's version was eventually released on their 2005 compilation album Det bästa med Karin och Anders Glenmark, for which it received a new backing track.

== Cover versions ==
- "Another You, Another Me" was covered by H & Claire in 2002 on their album of the same name, and given reworked lyrics by Björn Ulvaeus.

== Charts ==
Chart (1985)	Peak position
Swedish Albums (Sverigetopplistan)	9
