= Gemini (Swedish band) =

Swedish pop duo

- Origin: Sweden
- Genres: Pop
- Years active: 1985–2006
- Labels: Polar Music, Warner Music

Gemini were a Swedish brother and sister duo, consisting of Karin Glenmark and Anders Glenmark. The duo released two original albums: Gemini (1985) and Geminism (1987). Both albums reached the Swedish Top 20, while their success was limited to Scandinavia. Their only truly international release was the single "Just Like That" (the chorus of which was recorded and is, as yet, officially unreleased by ABBA).

Prior to their work as Gemini, Karin and Anders formed half of the group Glenmarks (with their uncle Bruno Glenmark and aunt Ann-Louise Hanson) and also released two singles together, with 1984's "Kall som is" ("Cold As Ice") being placed 4th at Melodifestivalen (the Swedish heats for the Eurovision Song Contest). The winner of Melodifestivalen, Herreys, went on to win the Eurovision Song Contest (with "Diggi-Loo Diggi-Ley") and recorded a version of "Kall som is" for their album.

Gemini's eponymous first album received an international release but was not a sales success. Much of the material was written by former ABBA members Benny Andersson and Björn Ulvaeus, who also coined the group's name. The remainder was written by Anders and his songwriting partner at that time, Ingela Forsman. The lead single, "Just Like That" reached the charts in central Europe, while the album track "Slowly" had previously been recorded by former ABBA member Frida Lyngstad on her 1984 album Shine. A Spanish cover version of Gemini's "Slowly" called "Muriendo Lento" was recorded by the Mexican group Timbiriche.

1987's Geminism album was a return to straightforward pop music and featured the singles "T.L.C.", "Wild About That Girl" and "Mio My Mio". Written by Andersson and Ulvaeus for inclusion in the Astrid Lindgren film adaptation Mio in the Land of Faraway, the Swedish-language recording "Mio min Mio" became the duo's most successful single release, reaching #3 on the Swedish charts.

Although not a Gemini recording per se, the 1994 release of Chess In Concert (by Andersson, Ulvaeus and Tim Rice) showcased their combined voices and distinctive harmonies. Anders played the role of The American and Karin played Florence.

Karin and Anders returned to the studio together in 2005 to record "Den som sa det var det" ("Those Who Said That Was That"), a new Swedish version of "Too Much Love Is Wasted", and added a new backing track to "When I Close My Eyes". The latter was originally intended to be released on their first, eponymous album but was deemed too similar to the closing track, "Another You, Another Me". All of these songs were included on the compilation album Det bästa med... (The Best Of...), which reached the Swedish Top 25.

In 2006 the duo signed a distribution deal with Sony Music Sweden, resulting in the album, Vår jul (Our Christmas). The Gemini name was dropped in favour of Glenmark & Glenmark, while all instruments and voices were provided by the duo themselves. The radio single "När vi närmar oss jul" ("As We Head Towards Christmas"), along with TV and radio interviews, successfully promoted their Christmas tour.

The band hadn't made any new recordings since then and effectively ended with the death of Karin Glenmark in 2025.

== Discography ==
=== Albums ===
Title	Album details	Peak chart positions	
Title	Album details	SWE	NLD
Gemini	Released: 1985; Label: Polar	9	28
Geminism	Released: 1987; Label: Polar	13	—
Det bästa med Karin och Anders Glenmark	Released: 2005; Label: Mono	45	—
Vår jul (released as Glenmark & Glenmark)	Released: 2006; Label: Metronome	26	—
"—" denotes a recording that did not chart.

=== Singles ===
Year	Title	Peak position					Album
Year	Title	SWE (Svensktoppen)	SWE (Tracks)	BEL	NLD	UK	Album
1985	"Slow Emotion"	—	—	—	—	—	Gemini
1985	"Another You, Another Me"	—	15	—	—	—	Gemini
1986	"Just Like That"	—	—	30	24	79	Gemini
1986	"Have Mercy"	—	—	—	—	—	Gemini
1986	"Live on the Love"	—	—	—	—	—	Gemini
1987	"T.L.C."	—	4	—	—	—	Geminism
1987	"Wild About That Girl"	—	—	—	—	—	Geminism
1987	"Mio min Mio"	1	—	—	—	—	Geminism
2005	"Den som sa det var det"	14	—	—	—	—	Det bästa med Karin och Anders Glenmark
2005	"When I Close My Eyes"	13	—	—	—	—	Det bästa med Karin och Anders Glenmark
2006	"När vi närmar oss jul"	14	—	—	—	—	Vår jul
