= Diggi Loo, Diggi Ley =

1984 studio album by Herreys

Studio album by Herreys
- Released: 1984
- Studio: CMM (Skara); KMH (Stockholm)
- Genre: Synth-pop; schlager
- Label: Mariann
- Producer: Anders Engberg

Herreys chronology
Diggi Loo, Diggi Ley (1984)	Crazy People (1985)

Singles from Diggi Loo, Diggi Ley
- 1. "Mirror, Mirror (Upon the Wall)" Released: 1984; 2. "Kall som is" Released: 1984; 3. "Diggi-Loo Diggi-Ley" Released: 1984

Diggi Loo, Diggi Ley is the debut studio album by Herreys, released in 1984. The most notable song on the album is "Diggi-Loo Diggi-Ley", which won the Eurovision Song Contest 1984.

== Track listing ==
1. "Diggi-Loo Diggi-Ley"
2. "Kom loss" ("Footloose")
3. "Inget som hindrar mig" ("Break My Stride")
4. "Är det sant"
5. "Om vi möts igen"
6. "Manhattan"
7. "Mitt hjärta slår samma slag"
8. "Mirror Mirror upon the Wall"
9. "Kom och ta mig"
10. "Every Song You Sing"
11. "Kall som is"
12. "Vill inte dansa mer"

== Charts ==
Chart (1984)	Peak position
Norwegian Albums (VG-lista)	11
Swedish Albums (Sverigetopplistan)	1
