= M.B. (song) =

1989 single by Orup

Single by Orup

from the album Orup 2
- Language: Swedish
- English title: Mercedes Benz
- B-side: "Du är inte min vän"
- Released: 1 February 1989
- Studio: Polar (Stockholm)
- Genre: Synth-pop
- Length: 3:36
- Label: WEA
- Songwriter: Orup
- Producer: Anders Glenmark

Orup singles chronology
"Min mor sa till mej" (1988)	"M.B." (1989)	"Upp över mina öron" (1989)

"M.B." (Mercedes-Benz) is a song by Swedish singer-songwriter Orup from his second studio album, Orup 2 (1989). WEA released it as the album's lead single on 1 February 1989.

== Track listing and formats ==
- Swedish 7-inch single

A. "M.B." – 3:36
B. "Du är inte min vän" – 3:22

- Swedish 12-inch single

A. "M.B." – 6:45
B1. "M.B." – 3:36
B2. "Du är inte min vän" – 3:22

== Credits and personnel ==
- Orup – songwriter, vocals
- Anders Glenmark – producer
- Lennart Östlund – engineering
- Sofia Wistam – cover art, photographer
- Beatrice Uusma – cover art designer

Credits and personnel adapted from the Orup 2 album and 7-inch single liner notes.

== Charts ==
Weekly chart performance for "M.B."
Chart (1989)	Peak position
Sweden (Sverigetopplistan)	5

== Certifications ==
Certifications for "M.B."
Region	Certification	Certified units/sales
Sweden (GLF)	Gold	25,000^{^}
^{^} Shipments figures based on certification alone.
