= Ankie Bagger =

Swedish singer (born 1964)

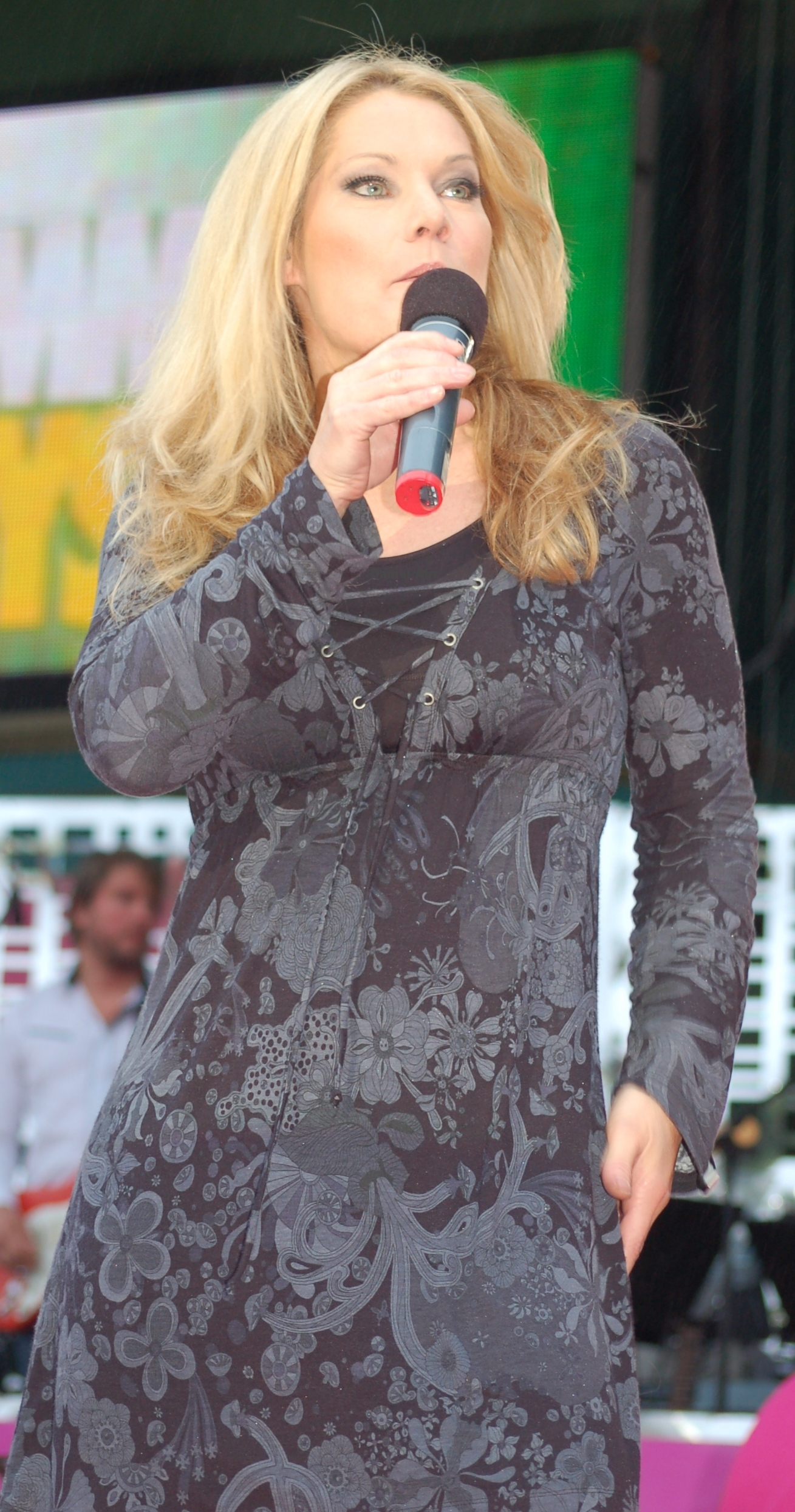
- Bagger in 2008

Background information
- Born: 30 September 1964 (age 61)
- Origin: Sweden
- Genres: Disco, pop
- Occupation: Singer

Ann-Christin "Ankie" Bagger (born 30 September 1964) is a Swedish disco/pop singer who first garnered attention in 1988 with her cover of Herreys' "Varje liten droppe regn" as "People Say It's in the Air". She is one of the solo artists that benefited from the works of Swedish hit composer/producer trio Norell Oson Bard.

== Discography ==
=== Studio albums ===
Title	Details	Peak chart positions
Title	Details	SWE
Where Were You Last Night	Released: November 1989; Label: Sonet; Format: CD, LP, CS	13
From the Heart	Released: June 1993; Label: Sonet; Format: CD, CS	50

=== Compilation albums ===
Title	Details	Peak chart positions
Title	Details	SWE
Flashback 01	Released: 1995; Label: Sonet; Format: CD, LP, CS	

=== Singles ===
Title	Year	Peak chart positions	Album
Title	Year	SWE	Album
"Vågar du Älska?"	1985	—	non album single
"People Say It's in the Air"	1988	7	Where Were You Last Night
"I Was Made for Lovin' You"	1989	19	Where Were You Last Night
"Where Were You Last Night"	1989	13	Where Were You Last Night
"Love Really Hurts Without You"	1990	—	Where Were You Last Night
"If You’re Alone Tonight"	1991	—	From the Heart
"Fire and Rain"	1991	—	non album single
"Every Day Every Hour"	1992	—	From the Heart
"Bang Bang"	1993	—	From the Heart
"Where Is Love?"	1993	—	From the Heart
"When I Call Your Name"	1993	—	From the Heart
"The Way I Dream About You"	1993	—	From the Heart
"Du kan inte lura mig" (with Peter Gustafson)	2009	4	non album singles
"Du Köper Aldrig Mig"/"You Can't Buy My Love"	2009	—	non album singles
"Secret Weapon" (with Peter Gustafson)	2010	—	non album singles
"Because It’s Christmas"	2011	—	non album singles
