= Geminism =

Album by Gemini

Studio album by Gemini
- Released: 1987
- Genre: Pop
- Label: Polydor
- Producer: Benny Andersson; Björn Ulvaeus

Gemini chronology
Gemini (1985)	Geminism (1987)	Det bästa med Karin och Anders Glenmark (2005)

Singles from Geminism
- 1. "T.L.C." / "Nearly There" Released: 1987; 2. "Wild About That Girl" / "I Am the Universe" Released: 1987; 3. "Mio min Mio" (Swedish Version) / "Beat the Heat" Released: 1987

Geminism is the second album by brother sister group Gemini, released in 1987. Like their previous album, Geminism features songwriting contributions again from artists such as Benny Andersson and Björn Ulvaeus, formerly of ABBA, and Anders Glenmark and Ingela Forsman. The album's material overall was less serious than its predecessor. One song from the LP became a hit: "Mio My Mio".

== Track listing ==
All songs written by Benny Andersson and Björn Ulvaeus except where indicated.

1. "T.L.C." – 2:52
2. "Beat the Heat" (Anders Glenmark/Ingela Forsman) – 3:20
3. "Mio My Mio" – 3:56
4. "Ghost Town" – 3:41
5. "I Am the Universe" – 4:05
6. "Sniffin' Out the Snakes" (Anders Glenmark/Ingela Forsman) – 3:39
7. "I'm a Bitch When I See Red" – 3:26
8. "There's No Way to Fool a Heart" (Anders Glenmark/Ingela Forsman) – 4:55
9. "Wild About That Girl" (Dan Sundqvist/Anders Glenmark/Björn Ulvaeus) – 3:19
10. "Nearly There" – 3:13

Associated recordings:

11. "Mio min Mio (Swedish Version)" - 3:59
12. "Mio moj Mio (Russian Version)" - 4:00
