= Då står pojkarna på rad =

1989 single by Orup

Single by Orup

from the album Orup 2
- Language: Swedish
- English title: Then the boys stand in a row
- B-side: "Kyss mig som du brukade göra"
- Released: 1989
- Studio: Polar (Stockholm)
- Genre: Synth-pop, Eurodance
- Length: 4:19
- Label: WEA
- Songwriter: Orup
- Producer: Anders Glenmark

Orup singles chronology
"Upp över mina öron" (1989)	"Då står pojkarna på rad" (1989)	"Regn hos mej" (1989)

"Då står pojkarna på rad" is a song by Swedish singer-songwriter Orup from his second studio album, Orup 2 (1989).

== Track listing and formats ==
- Swedish 7-inch single

A. "Då står pojkarna på rad" – 4:19
B. "Kyss mig som du brukade göra" – 3:49

== Credits and personnel ==
- Orup – songwriter, vocals
- Anders Glenmark – producer
- Lennart Östlund – engineering
- Sofia Wistam – cover art, photographer
- Beatrice Uusma – cover art designer

Credits and personnel adapted from the Orup 2 album and 7-inch single liner notes.

== Charts ==
Weekly chart performance for "Då står pojkarna på rad"
Chart (1989)	Peak position
Sweden (Sverigetopplistan)	8
