= Regn hos mej =

1989 single by Orup

Single by Orup

from the album Orup 2
- Language: Swedish
- English title: Rain at my place
- Released: 1989
- Studio: Polar (Stockholm)
- Genre: Synth-pop, R&B
- Length: 3:38
- Label: WEA
- Songwriter: Thomas Eriksson
- Producer: Anders Glenmark

Orup singles chronology
"Då står pojkarna på rad" (1989)	"Regn hos mej" (1989)	"My Earth Angel" (1991)

Audio
- "Regn hos mej" on YouTube

"Regn hos mej" is a song written Orup, and recorded by him on the album Orup 2. The song peaked at number 8 on the Swedish singles chart, and also topped Sommartoppen between 1–8 July 1989.

In 2003 the song was recorded by Miio on the album "På vårt sätt". In 2006, Shirley Clamp recorded the song on her album "Favoriter på svenska". Erik Linder recorded the song in 2009 on the album Inifrån. The covers have used the formal spelling of the title, "Regn hos mig".

== Charts ==
Chart (1989)	Peak position
Sweden (Sverigetopplistan)	8
