= Glenmark =

Glenmark may refer to:

- Glenmark Pharmaceuticals, an Indian pharmaceuticals company
- Glen Mark, Angus, Scotland, United Kingdom
- Glenmark (surname)
