= Crazy People (disambiguation) =

Crazy People is a 1990 comedy film starring Dudley Moore and Daryl Hannah.

Crazy People may also refer to:

- Crazy People (1934 film), a British comedy film
- Crazy People (Herreys album), 1985
- Crazy People (The Rowan Brothers album), 2002
- Crazy People, later The Goon Show, a BBC radio series
