= Orup 2 =

1989 studio album by Orup

Studio album by Orup
- Released: April 1989
- Studio: Polar (Stockholm)
- Genre: Pop
- Length: 42:15
- Label: WEA
- Producer: Anders Glenmark

Orup chronology
Orup (1988)	Orup 2 (1989)	Orupeansongs (1991)

Singles from Orup 2
- 1. "M.B." Released: 1 February 1989; 2. "Upp över mina öron" Released: 1989; 3. "Då står pojkarna på rad" Released: 1989; 4. "Regn hos mej" Released: 1989

Orup 2 is the second studio album by Swedish singer-songwriter Orup, released in April 1989, by WEA.

== Track listing ==
All tracks are written by Orup and produced by Anders Glenmark, except where noted

Orup 2 – Standard edition
No.	Title	Writer(s)	Length
1.	"Då står pojkarna på rad"		4:21
2.	"Upp över mina öron"	Orup, Anders Glenmark	2:57
3.	"Regn hos mej"		3:03
4.	"Ett tåg av kärlek"		4:17
5.	"Höga klackar och korta kjolar"		4:38
6.	"Med flyg till USA"		3:57
7.	"Nångång någon nånstans"		3:31
8.	"M.B."		4:29
9.	"Håll mej"		3:44
10.	"På omslaget till ett modemagasin"		3:53
11.	"Du är inte min vän"		3:25
Total length:			42:15

== Charts ==
Weekly chart performance for Orup 2
Chart (1989)	Peak position
Swedish Albums (Sverigetopplistan)	1
