= People Say It's in the Air =

"People Say It's in the Air" is a pop song originally performed by Herreys. It is composed by Tim Norell with lyrics by Ola Håkansson.

== Herreys versions ==
Varje liten droppe regn

EP by Herreys

"Varje liten droppe regn"

Song by Herreys

from the album Crazy People and EP Varje liten droppe regn
- Songwriter(s): Ingela Forsman, Tim Norell

Herreys also recorded and released a Swedish version, "Varje liten droppe regn", with lyrics by Ingela Forsman which appears on the album Crazy People.

=== Track listing ===
The EP contained the tracks

- "Varje liten droppe regn"
- "Du gav mitt liv en mening"
- "Crazy people"
- "So much more"

=== Chart performance ===
"Varje liten droppe regn" entered Swedish Trackslistan on 22 December 1984 and stayed on the chart for 3 weeks peaking at #13. It entered the singles chart on 21 December 1984 at #11 remaining on the list for 3 weeks.

== Jonna cover ==
In 1985 Finnish child artist Jonna Tervomaa (then only 12 years old and known with the artist name Jonna) had a cover of the song, with Finnish lyrics and name "Sadepisaroita", Raindrops. The song was on her second album, named Tykkään susta.

== Ankie Bagger cover ==
"People Say It's in the Air"

Single by Ankie Bagger

from the album Where Were You Last Night
- B-side: "That's No Reason"
- Released: 1988
- Songwriter(s): Tim Norell, Oson
- Producer(s): Tim Norell, Ola Håkansson, Anders Hansson

In 1988 the song was the breakthrough for Swedish singer Ankie Bagger and formed part of her album Where Were You Last Night.

== Izabelle cover ==
In 2004 Swedish artist Isabelle Filling (then known with the artist name Izabelle) had a cover of the song, with Swedish lyrics and name "Varje liten droppe regn".

=== Chart performance ===
Bagger's version entered Swedish Trackslistan on 25 February 1989 and stayed on the chart for 4 weeks, peaking at #3.
