= Sommarparty =

Song by Herreys

from the album Crazy People
- Language: Swedish
- Released: 1985
- Genre: pop, schlager
- Songwriter: Ingela Forsman
- Composer: Lasse Holm
- Producer: Anders Engberg

"Sommarparty" (English "Summer Party") is a summer song written by Lasse Holm and Ingela "Pling" Forsman, and originally performed by the Herreys at the 1985 Sopot Music Festival Grand Prix, winning the contest. The Herreys also recorded the song on the 1985 album Crazy People, and in English, as "Summerparty", on the 1986 album Herrey's Story

== Other recordings ==
The song was recorded by Stig-Roland Holmblm on the 1985 album Memories 1985. In 1996, Flamingokvintetten also recorded the song, releasing it as a single. and on the album Favoriter.

== Charts ==
Chart (1985)	Peak position
Sweden (Sverigetopplistan)	20
