= Where Were You Last Night =

Studio album by Ankie Bagger
- Released: 1989
- Genre: dance-pop, Hi-NRG
- Label: Sonet Grammofon AB
- Producer: Anders Hansson; Ola Håkansson; Tim Norell

Ankie Bagger chronology
Where Were You Last Night (1989)	From the Heart (1993)

Where Were You Last Night is a 1989 album released by Swedish pop artist Ankie Bagger. It was released in 1989 through Sonet Records

"People Say It's in the Air", "Where Were You Last Night", the Kiss cover "I Was Made for Lovin' You" and "Love Really Hurts Without You" were released as singles. "Where Were You Last Night" has been covered several times, most notably by the Finnish metal band Nightwish.

== Track listing ==
1. "Where Were You Last Night" 4:13
2. "I Was Made for Lovin' You" 4:01
3. "There's No Reason" 3:39
4. "Dance the Night Away" 3:42
5. "People Say It's in the Air" 3:27
6. "Don't You Know Don't You Know" 4:52
7. "In My House" 3:48
8. "Love Really Hurts Without You" 3:27
9. "It's You" 4:02
10. "Relax" 4:51
11. "Sandy, Sandy" 3:46
12. "Where Were You Last Night" (12" remix) 7:46

== Charts ==
Chart performance for Where Were You Last Night
Chart (1989/90)	Peak position
Swedish Albums (Sverigetopplistan)	13
