= Kall som is =

Single by Anders Glenmark & Karin Glenmark
- A-side: "Kall som is"
- B-side: "Flyga fri"
- Released: 1984
- Genre: pop, schlager
- Label: Glendisc
- Songwriters: Ingela Forsman, Anders Glenmark

"Kall som is" is a song written by Anders Glenmark and Ingela 'Pling' Forsman, and performed by Karin and Anders Glenmark at Melodifestivalen 1984, where it ended up 4th.

The song was also recorded by Herreys, releasing it as a single late in 1984, peaking at 18th position at the Swedish singles chart.

== Charts ==
=== Herreys recording ===
Chart (1984)	Peak position
Sweden (Sverigetopplistan)	18
