= 2nd Best to None =

Single by The Rivals
- Released: May 2009
- Genre: Pop
- Length: 3.10
- Label: Mono Music
- Songwriter(s): Benny Andersson, Björn Ulvaeus
- Producer(s): Benny Andersson, Björn Ulvaeus

"2nd Best to None" is a song written by Benny Andersson and Björn Ulvaeus - former members of pop group ABBA. The song is performed by the staff of Andersson's Stockholm hotel, Rival, going under the name The Rivals. Originally, the song was intended to be a jingle for the hotel's website, but has since become full-length with a promotional video featuring the staff.

Commenting on the song, Andersson stated that he came up with the idea at the hotel's fifth anniversary in September 2008 and was aware that a number of the staff were amateur singers and was satisfied that they could record a song together. He then asked Ulvaeus to come up with some lyrics. The song was released as a single on 6 May 2009. It came just as Andersson released an international album, Story of a Heart, with the title track as the lead single.

"2nd Best to None" reached No.54 in the Swedish charts.
