= Sparvöga =

Single by Marie Fredriksson
- Released: 22 February 1989
- Studio: EMI Studios, Stockholm
- Genre: Alternative pop
- Length: 4:10
- Label: EMI
- Songwriter(s): Marie Fredriksson
- Producer(s): Fredriksson; Anders Herrlin; Per "Pelle" Andersson

Marie Fredriksson singles chronology
"Efter stormen" (1987)	"Sparvöga" (1989)	"Så länge det lyser mittemot" (1992)

Music video
- "Sparvöga" on YouTube

"Sparvöga" ("Sparrow-Eye") is an alternative pop song recorded by Swedish singer-songwriter Marie Fredriksson, known internationally as the lead vocalist of the pop music duo Roxette. The track was written solely by Fredriksson, who also produced the song alongside Anders Herrlin and Per "Pelle" Andersson. It originally appeared as the theme music of the Swedish miniseries Sparvöga (1989), and was subsequently released on 7″ vinyl as a non-album single on 22 February 1989.

The song was an immediate success in her native country, peaking at number six on the Swedish Singles Chart as well as number three on the Swedish Airplay Chart. It was later certified gold by the Swedish Recording Industry Association for shipments in excess of 25,000 units. The track also received positive reviews, with several publications referring to it as one of the most beautiful pop songs ever released by a Swedish artist.

== Composition and style ==
The track was written as the theme music for the SVT2 miniseries Sparvöga (1989), which in turn was based on the 1975 novel of the same name, written by Ann-Charlotte Alverfors. Despite this, the lyrics of the song do not reference the plot of either the television show or the book, and were instead inspired by the sudden death of Marie's older sister Anna-Lisa, and the resulting grief which affected her family. Anna-Lisa was twenty years old when she was involved in a fatal traffic collision in December 1965; she was traveling to purchase a dress for her engagement party when her car was crushed by a tanker truck. Marie elaborated: "I remembered the grief, how the family was torn apart. Completely. After that I had to fend for myself. I was only seven years old. But I think that's where I got the fighting spirit which has benefited me so enormously—not least of all when I developed cancer. I never give up." The cover of the single shows Marie as a child posing alongside her older sister Tina; this image was taken during a professional photo shoot in 1962.

"Sparvöga" has a length of four minutes and ten seconds, and is composed in the 4/4 time signature with an andante tempo of 94 beats per minute. Each verse is composed of four repetitions of a Gm–C–D chord progression, followed by a chorus consisting of two repetitions of F–C–Dm–C–B♭, with an additional sequence of Am–D ending every chorus. Fredriksson's vocal range on the track spans from G3 to E5, the entire range of the alto voice type. The Swedish word "sparvöga" can be literally translated as "sparrow-eye", although it is figuratively used to describe particularly sharp human eyes, similar to the English expressions "hawk-eyed" or "eagle-eyed".

== Release and reception ==
"Sparvöga" was released as a non-album single exclusively in Sweden in February 1989, with an instrumental version of the track appearing as the b-side. The instrumental version contains a different musical arrangement to the original, and is over a minute shorter as a result. Anders Herrlin and Per "Pelle" Andersson are listed as the only producers of the latter version. The song initially peaked at number nine for two issues of the then-fortnightly Swedish Singles Chart, before peaking at number six on its third appearance. As such, it remained Fredriksson's highest-peaking single in her native country until "Där du andas" topped the chart in 2008. "Sparvöga" peaked at number eight on Sveriges Radio's "Tracks" chart, and was certified gold by the Swedish Recording Industry Association for shipments of over 25,000 units.

The track also peaked at number three for three non-consecutive weeks on the Swedish Airplay Chart, debuting on the chart three weeks after another song performed by Fredriksson, "Felicia – Adjö" (from Den flygande holländaren, a tribute album to Cornelis Vreeswijk), had peaked at number one. Both "Sparvöga" and "Felicia – Adjö", as well as two other songs performed by Fredriksson on Den flygande holländaren, appeared as bonus tracks when her 1992 album Den ständiga resan was reissued in 2002. The success of both "Sparvöga" and "Felicia – Adjö" saw Fredriksson receive several awards from the Swedish recording industry in 1989. She won the award for Pop/Rock Female at the Grammis, the Swedish equivalent of the Grammy Awards, and won the Rockbjörnen award that same year for Best Swedish Female.

In her review of the 2007 ballad compilation Tid för tystnad – Marie Fredrikssons ballader, Karin Bengtsson of Borås Tidning described "Sparvöga" as one of the most beautiful songs of all time, and said that it "still makes me a little teary-eyed, like it did back when it was originally released in the late 80's." A writer for Helsingborgs Dagblad described the song as "majestic" and "soaring", elaborating: "Few and far are the musicians who could hope to match the simple beauty of 'Sparvöga'. To be awestruck and have your imagination create its own universe, that's what happens when you listen to this song." Similarly, Swedish singer-songwriter Helena Josefsson praised the song as having a lullaby quality, and called it "the most beautiful pop song in Swedish that I have ever heard."

== Track listing ==
All songs written by Marie Fredriksson.

- 7" single (EMI 1363427)
1. "Sparvöga" – 4:10
2. "Sparvöga" (Instrumental) – 3:08

== Credits and personnel ==
Credits adapted from the liner notes of the original vinyl single.

Musicians

- Marie Fredriksson – vocals, keyboards, musical arrangement and production
- Micke "Syd" Andersson – hi-hat
- Per "Pelle" Andersson – keyboards, musical arrangement and production
- Anders Herrlin – bass, keyboards, musical arrangement, engineering and production
- Torbjörn Stener – guitars

Technical

- Kjell Andersson – sleeve design
- Peter Dahl – mastering (Polar Mastering, Stockholm)

== Charts and certifications ==
=== Weekly charts ===
Chart (1989)	Peak position
Sweden (Sverigetopplistan)	6

=== Certifications ===
Region	Certification	Certified units/sales
Sweden (GLF)	Gold	25,000^{^}
^{^} Shipments figures based on certification alone.
