= Upp över mina öron =

1989 single by Orup and Anders Glenmark

Single by Orup and Anders Glenmark

from the album Orup 2
- Language: Swedish
- English title: Up over my ears
- B-side: "Upp över mina öron (Version)"
- Released: 1989
- Genre: Pop rock
- Length: 2:56
- Label: WEA
- Songwriters: Thomas Eriksson; Anders Glenmark
- Producer: Anders Glenmark

Orup singles chronology
"M.B." (1989)	"Upp över mina öron" (1989)	"Då står pojkarna på rad" (1989)

Anders Glenmark singles chronology
"Prinsessor bor någon annanstans" (1989)	"Upp över mina öron" (1989)	"Hon sa" (1990)

Music video
- "Upp över mina öron" on YouTube

"Upp över mina öron" is a song by Orup & Anders Glenmark, and performed by them at Melodifestivalen 1989, where it ended up second.

The song peaked at 4th position in the Svensktoppen, where it remained for four weeks.

== Charts ==
Chart (1989)	Peak position
Sweden (Sverigetopplistan)	4
