= From the Heart (Ankie Bagger album) =

Studio album by Ankie Bagger
- Released: June 1993
- Label: Sonet

Ankie Bagger chronology
Where Were You Last Night (1989)	From the Heart (1993)	Flashback (1995)

From the Heart is a 1993 album released by Swedish singer Ankie Bagger. The album peaked at #50 in Sweden.

== Track listing ==
1. "Where Is Love?" (Norell Oson Bard)
2. "If You're Alone Tonight" (Norell Oson Bard)
3. "Coming from the Heart" (Norell Oson Bard)
4. "Bang Bang" (Norell Oson Bard)
5. "How Can I Say I'm Sorry" (Tommy Ekman)
6. "When I Call Your Name" (Norell Oson Bard)
7. "I'm Still in Love With You" (Alexander Bard, Kassu Halonen, Kisu Jernström, Ola Håkansson, Vexi Salmi)
8. "Every Day Every Hour" (Norell Oson Bard)
9. "Here I Go Again" (Alexander Bard, Anders Hansson, Ola Håkansson)
10. "The Way I Dream About You" (Norell Oson Bard)

== Charts ==
Chart performance for From the Heart
Chart (1993)	Peak position
Swedish Albums (Sverigetopplistan)	50
