= Mio in the Land of Faraway =

1987 Swedish film by Vladimir Grammatikov

- Swedish DVD cover featuring 1987 promotional artwork
- Directed by: Vladimir Grammatikov
- Written by: William Aldridge
- Based on: Mio, My Son by Astrid Lindgren
- Produced by: Ingemar Ejve
- Starring: Christopher Lee; Christian Bale; Nicholas Pickard; Timothy Bottoms; Susannah York
- Cinematography: Aleksandr Antipenko; Kjell Vassdal
- Edited by: Darek Hodor
- Music by: Benny Andersson; Anders Eljas
- Production companies: Nordisk Tonefilm International; Gorky Film Studio
- Distributed by: Sandrew Metronome
- Release dates: July 1987 (MIFF); 18 August 1987 (NIFF); 16 October 1987 (Sweden)
- Running time: 99 minutes
- Countries: Sweden; Soviet Union; Norway
- Language: English
- Budget: SEK 55,000,000 (est.)
- Box office: Sweden: SEK 17,799,205

Mio in the Land of Faraway (Swedish: Mio min Mio; Russian: Мио, мой Мио, romanized: Mio, moy Mio) is a 1987 fantasy film directed by Vladimir Grammatikov, and starring Christopher Lee, Christian Bale, Nicholas Pickard, Timothy Bottoms and Susannah York. Based on the 1954 novel Mio, My Son by Astrid Lindgren, it tells the story of a boy from Stockholm who travels to an otherworldly fantasy realm and frees the land from an evil knight's oppression.

Mio in the Land of Faraway was co-produced by companies from Sweden, Norway and the Soviet Union with a budget of about fifty million Swedish kronor, making it the most expensive film adaptation of an Astrid Lindgren book during her lifetime. It featured an international cast consisting largely of British, Russian and Scandinavian actors, while its filming locations included Stockholm, Moscow, Crimea, and Scotland. The film was shot in English and subsequently dubbed in Swedish and Russian. Its special effects were created by Derek Meddings. The film's theme song, "Mio My Mio", was composed by two former ABBA members, Benny Andersson and Björn Ulvaeus, and performed by the Swedish band Gemini.

Released in 1987, the film saw Nicholas Pickard's debut as an actor and marked Christian Bale's first appearance in a feature film. It won the Cinekid Film Award in Amsterdam, while its theme song became a top three hit in Sweden. In contrast, Swedish reviewers received the film unfavorably, criticizing it as a poor adaptation of Lindgren's novel.

== Plot ==
The film opens in modern Stockholm. Orphaned by his mother's death and father's disappearance, Bosse (Nicholas Pickard) suffers neglect by his guardians Aunt Edna (Gunilla Nyroos) and Uncle Sixten, as well as abuse from bullies. His best friend is Benke (Christian Bale), whose father Bosse envies. Running away one night to seek his own father, Bosse meets the kindly shopkeeper Mrs Lundin (Linn Stokke), who gives him an apple and asks him to mail a postcard. The postcard is addressed to the Land of Faraway, informing its King of Bosse's impending journey there. After Bosse mails the postcard, his apple turns golden. Dropping the transfigured apple in shock, Bosse stumbles upon a genie (Geoffrey Staines) trapped in a bottle and frees it.

It turns out that this spirit has travelled from the Land of Faraway to seek Bosse, and that the golden apple is Bosse's identifying sign. With the boy clinging to his beard, the genie transports Bosse to the Land of Faraway and sets him down on Green Meadow Island. There, Bosse discovers that his real name is Mio, and that his father is the King (Timothy Bottoms). Treated with love and generosity, Mio leads an idyllic life on Green Meadow Island. He receives the horse Miramis as a gift from his father and makes friends with the local children. The latter include the farm boy Jiri, the shepherd boy Nonno, and the royal gardener's son Jum-Jum, who turns out to be Benke's double. Together, Mio and Jum-Jum learn to play pan flute music from Nonno.

Not all is well however. From a whispering well, Mio learns that an iron-clawed knight from the Land Outside, Kato (Christopher Lee), has been kidnapping children and making them his servants by ripping out their hearts and replacing them with stone. Those who refuse to serve him are transformed into birds and condemned to circle his castle in flight. Even his name induces terror when spoken.

With Jum-Jum and Miramis, Mio leaves Green Meadow Island and journeys to the Forest of Mysteries, where he tears his cape on the briars. The Weaver Woman (Susannah York) receives the boys at her house, mending Mio's torn cape and sewing a new lining into it. Hearing the Bird of Grief lament for Kato's victims, and told that the Weaver Woman's daughter Millimani is among them, Mio gradually learns of his long-prophesied destiny to confront Kato in the Land Outside.

Journeying to the Land Outside, Mio and Jum-Jum meet Eno (Igor Yasulovich), a hungry old man living in a cave, and offer him food. In gratitude, Eno tells them to seek a weapon against Kato from the Forger of Swords, who has been imprisoned and enslaved by Kato in the Blackest Mountain beyond the Dead Forest. Meanwhile, Kato's servants capture Miramis. The boys are forced to continue their journey on foot, pursued by Kato's servants through the Dead Forest and the Blackest Mountain. Separated in the mountain's tunnels, the boys find each other by playing their pan-flutes. They finally reach the Forger of Swords (Sverre Anker Ousdal), who tells the boys about Kato's stone heart and provides Mio a sword capable of penetrating it.

Mio and Jum-Jum journey to Kato's castle, where they are captured and imprisoned. Kato throws Mio's sword into the lake outside the castle. Mio soon discovers that his newly lined cape turns him invisible when worn inside-out, and reclaims his sword with the help of Kato's birds. Armed and invisible, he escapes and makes his way to Kato's chamber, eluding the castle guards. Taking off his cloak, Mio challenges Kato to combat and eventually slays him. Turning into rock, the dead knight crumbles into pieces. Mio picks up Kato's stone heart and holds it outside a window, where it transforms into a bird and flies away.

Kato's birds turn back into children, Jum-Jum and Miramis are freed, and Kato's castle collapses into ruin. The Dead Forest begins to revive. Returning to Green Meadow Island, the children rejoin their families, and Mio rejoins his father.

== Cast ==
Actor	Role
Nicholas Pickard (Swedish voice: Pontus Lantz) (Russian voice: Slava Galiulin)	Mio / Bosse
Christian Bale (Swedish voice: Max Winerdahl) (Russian voice: Kesha Ivanov)	Jum-Jum / Benke
Christopher Lee (Swedish voice: Tor Isedal) (Russian voice: Sergey Malishevsky)	Kato
Timothy Bottoms (Swedish voice: Tomas Bolme) (Russian voice: Timofei Spivak)	The King
Susannah York (Swedish voice: Helena Brodin) (Russian voice: Larissa Danilina)	The Weaver Woman
Sverre Anker Ousdal (Swedish voice: John Harryson) (Russian voice: Vladimir Antonik)	Forger of Swords
Igor Yasulovich (Swedish voice: Per Sjöstrand)	Eno / Carpetbeater
Linn Stokke (Swedish voice: Lena Endre) (Russian voice: Marina Levtova)	Mrs. Lundin
Stig Engström (Swedish voice: Ulf Håkan Jansson) (Russian voice: Vladislav Kovalkov)	Benke's Father
Geoffrey Staines (Swedish voice: Hans Strååt) (Russian voice: Andrey Tarasov)	The Spirit
Gunilla Nyroos (Russian voice: Nelli Vitepash)	Aunt Edna
Lyobov Germanova	Jum-Jum's Mother
Andrei Petrov (Swedish voice: Christoffer Levah)	Jiri
Andrei Sergeyev (Swedish voice: Johan Randqvist)	Nonno
Anna Foght	Millimani

== Major themes ==
As a fantasy work, Mio in the Land of Faraway features a number of tropes associated with the genre. These include the hero's travel to a fantasy realm through a magical portal, his discovery of his true name, and his battle against a Dark Lord figure. In addition, the film's early scenes take the form of an urban fantasy concerned with a young boy's wishful desires and perceptions.

== Production ==
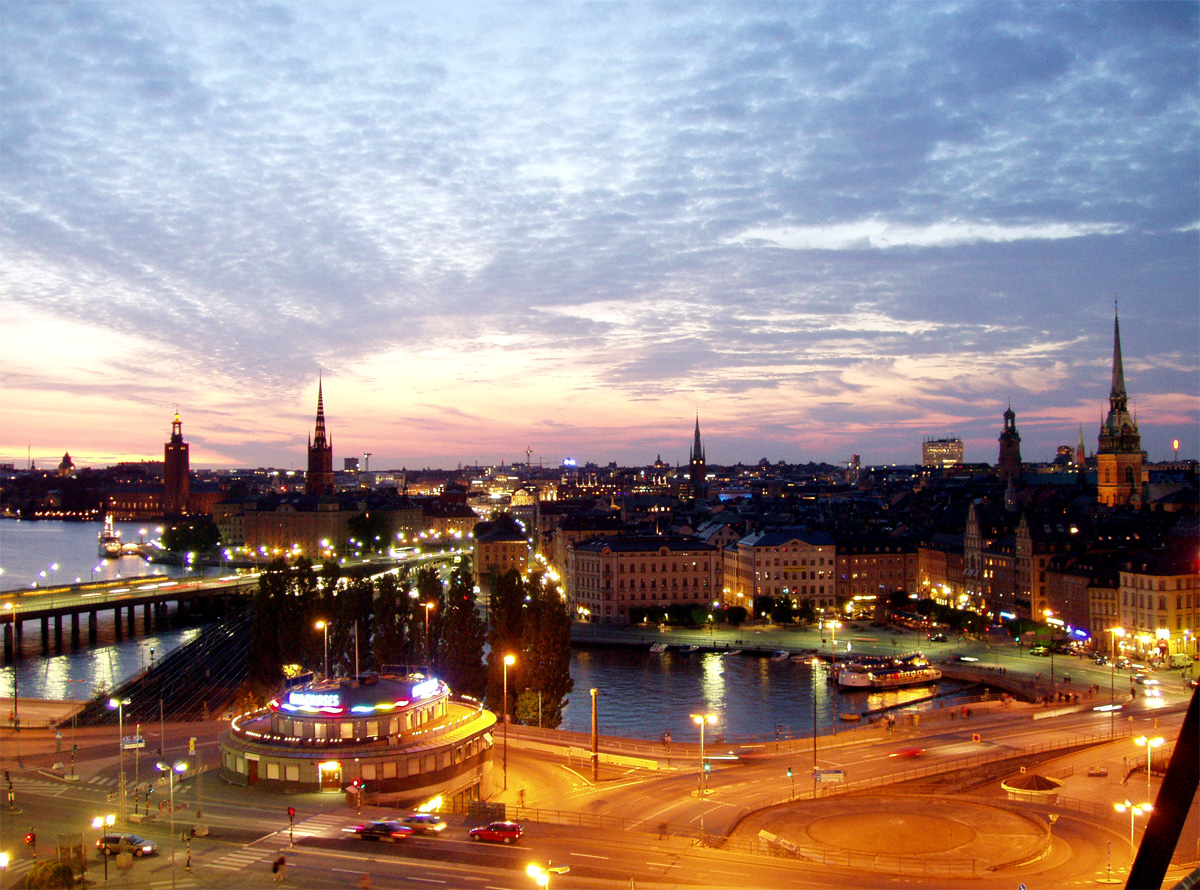
Stockholm

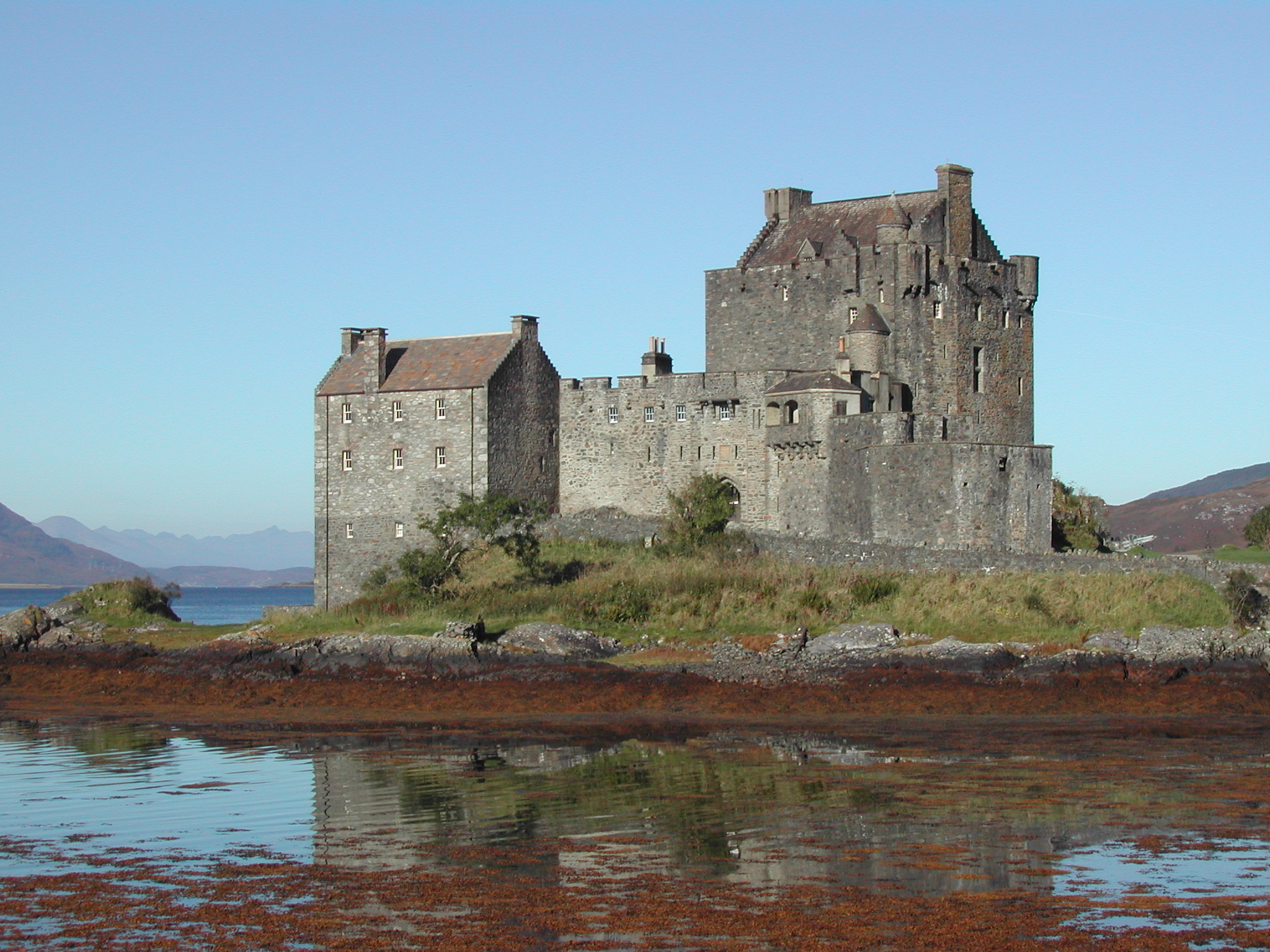
Eilean Donan Castle

Various companies from Sweden, Norway and the Soviet Union were involved in making Mio in the Land of Faraway. It was co-produced by Nordisk Tonefilm International AB and Gorky Film Studio with assistance from the Swedish Film Institute, Norway Film Development, and Sovinfilm. Its budget was about fifty million Swedish kronor, making it the most expensive film adaptation of an Astrid Lindgren book during her lifetime.

Filming took place between March and July 1986. Helmed by Russian director Vladimir Grammatikov, the project featured an international cast consisting largely of British, Scandinavian and Russian actors. Filming locations included Stockholm, Moscow, the Crimea, and Eilean Donan Castle in Scotland. The film was shot in English, and subsequently dubbed in Swedish and Russian.

For his role as Kato, Christopher Lee had to wear a steel hand during filming sessions. In 1997, he recalled various difficulties while shooting the film in Moscow during 1986:

As a work environment, it was a horror story. [...] For us, the faraway land was the Soviet Union, where the food was uneatable, the sanitation unspeakable, the political people ubiquitous. [...] It was irritating work: Nothing ever happened before lunch, and since it took forever to light a scene, not much after it. These were the standard frustrations of Russian filmmaking at that time.

The Chernobyl disaster occurred at the same time that the cast and crew were filming scenes in Ukraine, forcing them to evacuate the area and postpone shooting for a month. In a 2008 Details interview, Christian Bale briefly recalled their evacuation and subsequent return: "We knew something had occurred, because production came to us and they said, 'We're done. We have to leave.' A month later we were back. We would have somebody with a Geiger counter at every dinner, scanning each plate".

The film's special effects were created by Derek Meddings. The film's theme song, "Mio My Mio", was composed by two former ABBA members, Benny Andersson and Björn Ulvaeus, and performed by the Swedish band Gemini. The film's background music was composed by Anders Eljas with assistance from Benny Andersson, and performed by the Soviet Film Symphony Orchestra with Sergei Skripka as the conductor.

This film was Nicholas Pickard's debut as an actor. It was also the feature-film debut of Christian Bale, who reappeared in December that year as the NBR-acclaimed lead of Steven Spielberg's Empire of the Sun (1987).

== Release ==
The film appeared at the Moscow International Film Festival in July 1987, with its Russian dub competing in the Children's Films category. The film also appeared at the Norwegian International Film Festival the following month on 18 August. It premiered in Sweden on 16 October of the same year.

The film is distributed in Sweden by Sandrew Metronome, and in the United States by Miramax Films as The Land of Faraway. It was released on VHS by Prism Entertainment in 1988 and by Starmaker Entertainment in 1992. It was released on DVD by Anchor Bay Entertainment in the US during 2001, and by Eureka Entertainment in Britain during 2007.

== Reception ==
=== Box office ===
In Sweden, the film grossed about 17,800,000 Swedish kronor at the box office.

=== Critical response ===
In Sweden, the film received poor reviews upon its release. According to an article published by film scholar Christine Holmlund in Cinema Journal, Swedish reviewers criticized it for being "canned Astrid Lindgren" and "an incoherent jumble of landscapes and cast members, badly dubbed to boot". Holmlund also attributed the film's negative reception to its omission of the original work's psychological nuances. Another factor was the film's international eclecticism in its cast and settings, which Holmlund characterized as "Anglicizing" and contrasted to the Swedish medievalism of the better-received Lindgren adaptations The Brothers Lionheart (1977) and Ronia the Robber's Daughter (1984).

Critical response elsewhere has ranged from mixed to negative. Following the 1987 festival screening in Norway, the film-industry magazine Variety criticized Mio in the Land of Faraway for its unsubtle handling of Lindgren's text and the actors, although it praised the film's appealing appearance and high production values as well as Christopher Lee's performance. Following the 2007 DVD release in Britain, the genre magazine Dreamwatch characterized Mio in the Land of Faraway as a "strange, otherworldly film" and an "intriguing curio" from the 1980s, but criticized its sentimentality and its "sugary tone and sub-Tolkien dialogue". Following a memorial screening in 2004, the Chicago Reader characterized the film as "unimaginative" and its acting as "wooden", again citing Lee as an exception.

One decade after the film's initial release, The Encyclopedia of Fantasy praised the film's early scenes as a "beautifully effective" urban fantasy, but criticized the later scenes as "cliché-ridden and turgid". Seeing the film as an attempt to emulate The NeverEnding Story (1984), it summed up Mio in the Land of Faraway as a "tired, imitative and cynical" adaptation of Lindgren's novel.

=== Awards ===
In Amsterdam, the film won the Cinekid Film Award in 1988.

== Soundtrack ==
In 1987, Gemini released the film's theme song "Mio My Mio" as a single and as part of their album Geminism. It became a hit in Sweden, with the single maintaining top ten position for 5 weeks.

In 1987 and 1988, CBS Records released the film's soundtrack on LP and CD. These releases included both "Mio My Mio" as well as the score. The LP album (CBS 460594-8) contains the following tracks:

1. "Mio Overture" (Anders Eljas) – 3:16
2. "Kite-Flying" (Anders Eljas) – 1:26
3. "Aunt Edna's Waiting At Home" (Anders Eljas) – 0:44
4. "Bosse Runs Away" (Anders Eljas) – 4:36
5. "The Journey To The Land Of Faraway" (Anders Eljas, Benny Andersson) — 6:01
6. "The Shepherd's Flute #1" (Benny Andersson) — 0:27
7. "Kato's Icy Wind" (Anders Eljas) — 2:09
8. "The Bridge Of The Morning Light" (Anders Eljas) — 1:46
9. "The Land Outside" (Anders Eljas) — 1:51
10. "Miramis Is Captured" (Anders Eljas) — 1:58
11. "The Hunt For Mio And Jum-Jum" (Anders Eljas) — 1:40
12. "The Shepherd's Flute #2" (Benny Andersson) — 0:43
13. "The Sword" (Anders Eljas) — 1:00
14. "Inside Kato's Castle" (Anders Eljas) — 5:04
15. "Prisoners Of Kato" (Anders Eljas) — 0:40
16. "To The Dungeon" (Anders Eljas) — 1:32
17. "Return Of The Sword" (Anders Eljas) — 0:37
18. "The Final Battle" (Anders Eljas) — 5:36
19. "The Reunion" (Anders Eljas, Benny Andersson) — 1:44
20. "Mio My Mio" (Benny Andersson, Björn Ulvaeus; performed by Gemini) — 3:55
