= Crazy People (Herreys album) =

Studio album by Herreys
- Released: 1985
- Label: Mariann

Herreys chronology
Diggi Loo, Diggi Ley (1984)	Crazy People (1985)	Not Funny (1985)

Singles from Crazy People
- 1. "Varje liten droppe regn" Released: 1984; 2. "Sommarparty" Released: 1985

Crazy People is a 1985 music album by Herreys.

In 1985 Herreys won the Sopot Music Festival Grand Prix performing the song "Sommarparty", which was released as a single. "Varje liten droppe regn" was also released as a single both in Swedish and in English (as "People Say It's in the Air").

"People from Ibiza" is a cover of the 1984 single performed by Sandy Marton.

== Track listing ==
1. "Varje liten droppe regn" ("People Say It's in the Air")
2. "People from Ibiza"
3. "Nej du kan inte få ner mig på knä igen"
4. "I'm So Sorry"
5. "Stopp"
6. "10 9 8 7 6 5 4"
7. "Sommarparty" ("Summer Party")
8. "Crazy People"
9. "Turn Turn Turn"
10. "Vintergatan"
11. "Reduced to Tears"
12. "Why Why"

== Chart performance ==
On 22 February 1985, the album peaked at no 10 on the Swedish albums chart.
