= Mio, My Son =

Children's novel by Astrid Lindgren

- First edition
- Author: Astrid Lindgren
- Original title: Mio, min Mio
- Illustrator: Ilon Wikland
- Language: Swedish
- Genre: Children's literature Fantasy
- Publisher: Rabén & Sjögren
- Publication date: 1954
- Publication place: Sweden
- Awards: Deutschen Jugendbuchpreis of 1956

Mio, My Son is a children's book by Swedish writer Astrid Lindgren. It was first published in 1954 in Sweden with the Swedish title Mio, min Mio (literally "Mio, my Mio"). The writing is stylised and the story strongly reminiscent of traditional fairy tales and folklore. It received a German Youth Literature Prize (Deutschen Jugendbuchpreis) in 1956. The book is 204 pages long.

== Plot ==
Mio, My Son starts by introducing Bo Vilhelm Olsson (nicknamed Bosse), a nine-year-old boy who has been taken in by an elderly couple who dislike boys. They harass him and tell him to stay out of their way. Bosse's mother had died during childbirth and he has never known his father. His only friend is a boy his age, Benke. One day he receives an apple from the kindly shopkeeper, Mrs. Lundin, who asks him to mail a postcard for her. Before doing so, he takes a look at the postcard and sees it is addressed to a king, saying that his son will soon be coming home, recognised by his possession of a golden apple. Bosse looks at his apple and suddenly it turns into gold.

Soon after, Bosse finds a bottle with a spirit trapped inside. Upon freeing it, the spirit recognises the apple and takes Bosse to another world, far, far away.

Upon arriving, Bosse is told that his real name is Mio, and that he is the son of the king and thus a prince of the land. He finds a new best friend, Jum-Jum, and receives the horse Miramis from his father. As he explores his father's kingdom, he meets and befriends other children, but also learns that not everything in this world is as wonderful as it first seemed. In the lands beyond that of the king lives an evil, stone-hearted knight named Kato, whose hatred is so strong that the land around his castle is barren and singed. He has kidnapped several children from the nearby villages, and he poses a constant threat to the people living there.

Mio is told that his destiny is to fight Kato, even though he is only a child. Together with Jum-Jum and Miramis, Mio sets out on a perilous journey into the land of Kato, as the stories have foretold for thousands and thousands of years.

In the American version, Mio is first called Karl Anders Nilsson, nicknamed Andy, and Jum-Jum's name is Pompoo.

== Themes ==
Central themes in the story focus on friendship granting strength to endure hardships, that it is sometimes necessary to leave a safe situation and put oneself at risk for a greater cause, and that evil often coincides with unhappiness.

== Literary significance and reception ==
Mio, My Son is Lindgren's first high fantasy novel. Her subsequent contributions to this genre include The Brothers Lionheart (1973) and Ronja, the Robber's Daughter (1981).

== Film version ==
In 1987, the book was adapted for film as Mio in the Land of Faraway. Filmed in English and dubbed in Swedish and Russian, the film starred Nicholas Pickard as Mio, Christian Bale as Jum-Jum, Christopher Lee as Kato, and Timothy Bottoms as the King. The film's director was Vladimir Grammatikov.

== See also ==
- Tegnérlunden
