= Karin Glenmark =

Swedish pop and rock singer (1952–2025)

- Born: Karin Margareta Glenmark; 8 April 1952; Tomelilla, Sweden
- Died: 30 October 2025 (aged 73)
- Genres: Pop, schlager
- Occupation: Singer

Karin Margareta Glenmark (8 April 1952 – 30 October 2025) was a Swedish pop and rock singer. She was the niece to Bruno Glenmark and sister to Anders Glenmark. Together with Anders, she was a part of the siblings duo Gemini, and together with uncle Bruno and his wife Ann-Louise Hanson, they formed the group Glenmarks.

Glenmark participated in Melodifestivalen five times. She performed with Glenmarks in 1973 with the song "En liten sång som alla andra" (finished joint 4th), in 1974 with the song "I annorlunda land" (8th), and in 1975 with the song "Lady Antoinette" (6th place).

In 1983, Glenmark took part alone with the song "Se" (3rd place), and in 1984, she took part together with her brother Anders with the song "Kall som is" (4th place). The following year, Karin and Anders took the Gemini name, as suggested by Björn Ulvaeus of ABBA (who, together with Benny Andersson, co-produced Gemini's two albums). Their 1996 release was produced by Michael Saxell, who also composed all the songs. Swedish poet Jacques Werup wrote the lyrics.

Glenmark had three children: Lisa, Nils, and Anton. Nils Tull is active in the music industry, singing in the band Hoffmaestro. Glenmark died on 30 October 2025, at the age of 73.

== Discography ==
=== Albums ===
Title	Album details	Peak position	Producer
Title	Album details	SWE	Producer
Mitt innersta rum	Released: 1984 Label: Glen Disc Format: LP, cassette	—	Anders Glenmark
Karin Glenmark	Released: 1996 Label: Pool Sounds Format: CD	46	Michael Saxell
Vår jul (credited as Glenmark & Glenmark)	Released: 2006 Label: Metronome Format: CD	26	Anders Glenmark
"—" denotes releases that did not chart, or that no chart existed.

=== Singles ===
Year	Title	Peak chart positions	Album
Year	Title	SWE (Svensktoppen)	Album
1972	"Efter regn så kommer sol"	—	Glenmarks
1972	"Min sista tos" (B-side to "Efter regn så kommer sol")	9	Glenmarks
1972	"Hur går det till" (Karin och Anders Glenmark)	6	Glenmarks
1975	"Boom, boom, boom" (Karin & Anders Glenmark)	—	Glenmarks II
1980	"Xanadu" (Swedish version)	2	Non-album single
1983	"Se"	—	Non-album single
1984	"Kall som is" (Karin & Anders Glenmark)	—	Mitt innersta rum
1991	"Jag har en dröm"	—	Les Misérables
1993	"En enda röst" (with Dana Dragomir)	3	Non-album single
1996	"Viska mitt namn"	—	Karin Glenmark
1996	"När livet är gott"	—	Karin Glenmark
1996	"Jag tände ljusen"	—	Karin Glenmark
2006	"När vi närmar oss jul" (credited as Glenmark & Glenmark)	14	Glenmark & Glenmark
"—" denotes the single failed to chart or was not released.
