= Benny Andersson =

Swedish musician and composer (born 1946)

Benny Andersson KVO1kl
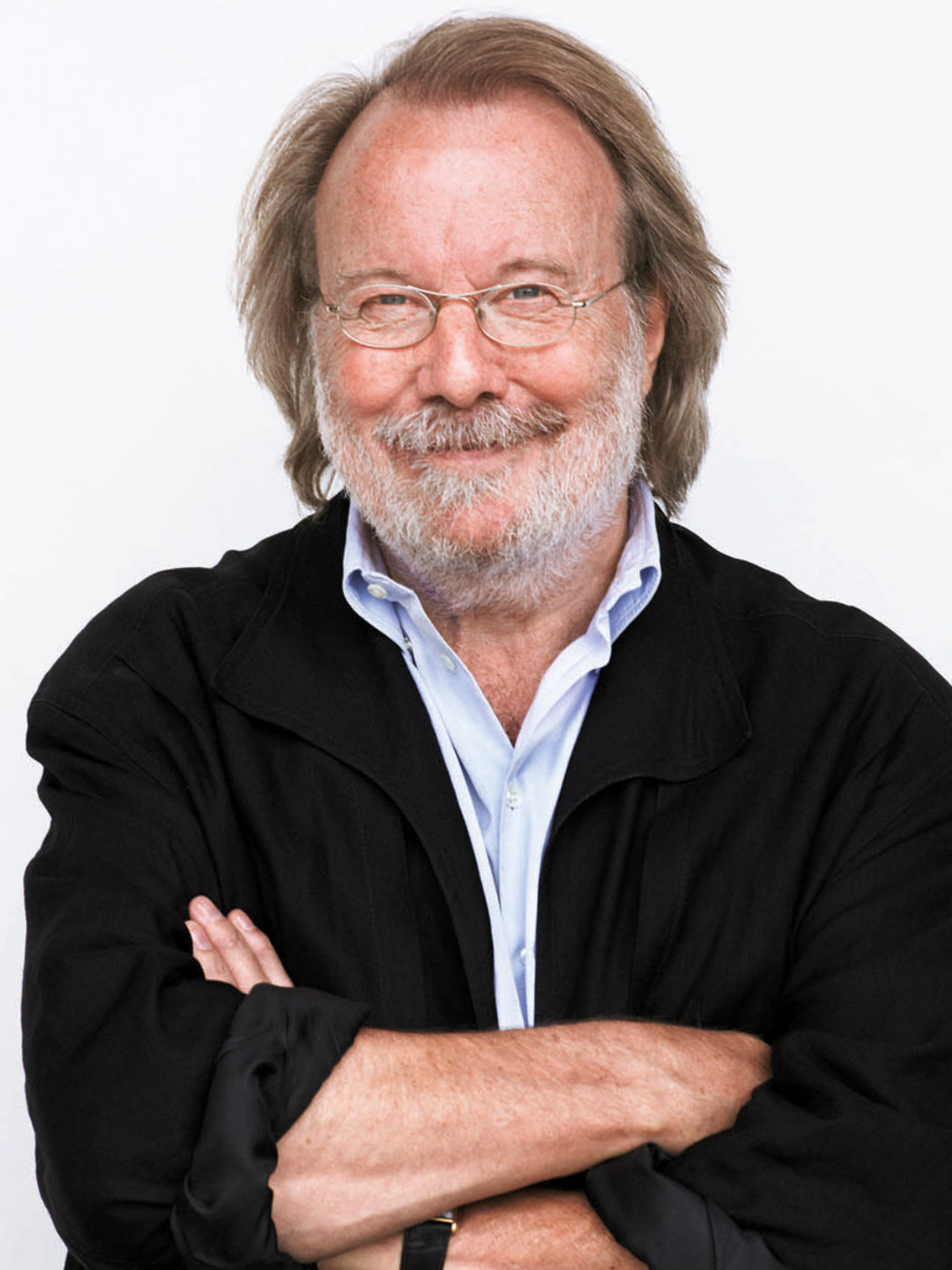
- Andersson in 2012
- Born: Göran Bror Benny Andersson; 16 December 1946 (age 79); Stockholm, Sweden
- Occupations: Musician; composer; producer; songwriter
- Years active: 1964–present
- Spouses: Anni-Frid Lyngstad (m. 1978; div. 1981) Mona Nörklit (m. 1981)
- Partner: Christina Grönvall (1961–1966)
- Children: 3
- Musical career
- Genres: Folk rock; Europop; Swedish folk; Euro disco; schlager
- Instruments: Keyboards; synthesizer; accordion; vocals
- Member of: Benny Anderssons orkester
- Formerly of: Hep Stars; ABBA

Göran Bror Benny Andersson (Swedish: [ˈbɛ̌nːʏ ˈânːdɛˌʂɔn]; born 16 December 1946) is a Swedish musician, composer and producer best known as a member of the pop group ABBA and co-composer of the musicals Chess, Kristina från Duvemåla, and Mamma Mia! For the 2008 film version of Mamma Mia! and its 2018 sequel, Mamma Mia! Here We Go Again, he also worked as an executive producer. Since 2001, he has been active with his own band Benny Anderssons orkester.

== Early life ==
Göran Bror Benny Andersson was born 16 December 1946 in the Vasastan district of Stockholm to civil engineer Gösta Andersson (1912–1973) and his wife Laila (1920–1971). His sister Eva-Lis Andersson followed in 1948. Andersson's musical interest was spurred by his father and grandfather (Efraim), who played the accordion. At the age of six, they bought him one, too, and introduced him to Swedish folk music, traditional music, and schlager. The first records he owned were "Du Bist Musik" by Italian schlager singer Caterina Valente and Elvis Presley's "Jailhouse Rock". He was especially impressed by the flip side, "Treat Me Nice", as this featured a piano. This variety of different kinds of music influenced him through the years.

At ten, Andersson got his own piano and taught himself to play. He was influenced by Elmore James and Brian Jones, left school at 15 and began to perform at youth clubs. This is when he met his first girlfriend Christina Grönvall, with whom he had two children: Peter (born 1963) and Heléne (born 1965). In early 1964, Benny and Christina joined "Elverkets Spelmanslag" ("The Electricity Board Folk Music Group"); the name was a punning reference to their electric instruments. Their repertoire consisted mainly of instrumentals, including "Baby Elephant Walk"; he also wrote his first songs.

== Career ==
=== Hep Stars (1964–1969) ===
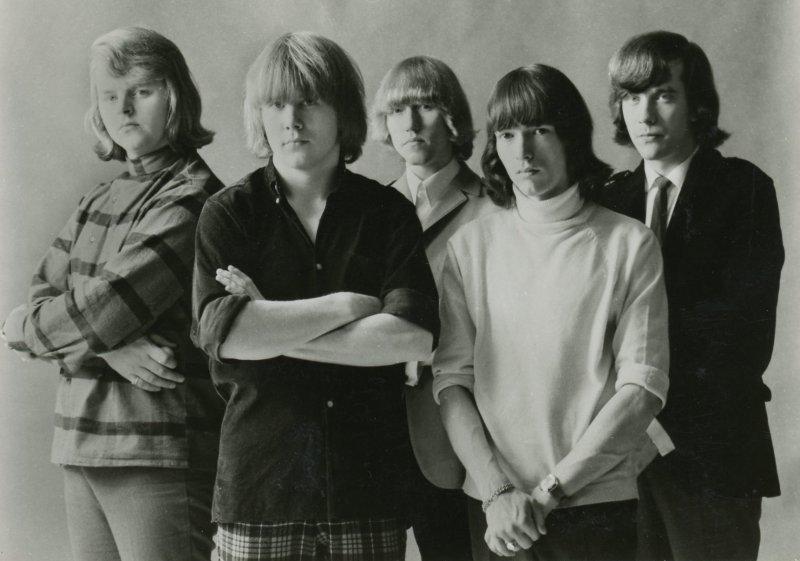
Andersson (second from left) with the Hep Stars in 1965

In October 1964 he joined the Hep Stars as keyboardist and they made a breakthrough in March 1965 with their hit "Cadillac", eventually becoming the most celebrated of the Swedish 1960s pop bands. Andersson secured his place as the band's keyboardist and musical driving force as well as a teen idol. The band performed mostly covers of international hits, but Andersson soon started writing his own material, and gave the band the classic hits "No Response", "Sunny Girl", "Wedding", "Consolation", "It's Nice To Be Back" and "She Will Love You", among others.

=== Before ABBA (1969–1972) ===
Andersson met Björn Ulvaeus in June 1966, and the two men started writing songs together, their first being "Isn't It Easy To Say", eventually recorded by the Hep Stars. He also had a fruitful songwriting collaboration with Lasse Berghagen, with whom he wrote several songs and submitted "Hej, Clown" for the 1969 Melodifestivalen – the Swedish Eurovision Song Festival finals. The song finished in second place. During this contest, he met vocalist Anni-Frid Lyngstad, and they soon became a couple. Around the same time, his songwriting companion Ulvaeus met vocalist Agnetha Fältskog.

The personal relationships and Andersson and Ulvaeus' songwriting collaboration led quite naturally to the very close cooperation which the four friends had during the following years. Benny and Björn scored their first hits as songwriters in the spring of 1969: "Ljuva sextital" (a hit with Brita Borg) and "Speleman" (a hit for the Hep Stars). As the two couples began supporting each other during recording sessions, the sound of the women's voices convinced the songwriters to model their 'group' on various MOR acts such as Blue Mink, Middle of the Road and Sweet.

=== ABBA (1972–1982) ===
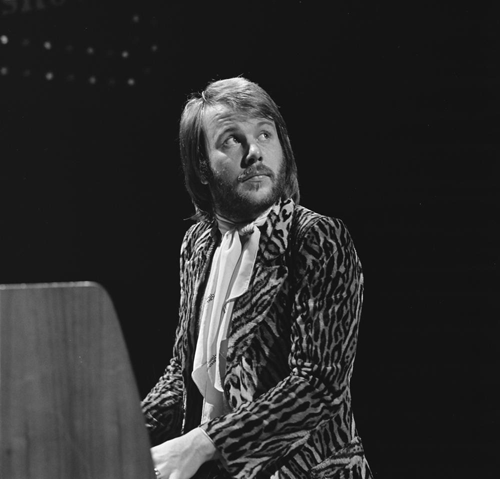
Andersson on 'The Eddy Go Round Show' in 1975

The group's breakthrough came with winning the Eurovision Song Contest for Sweden with "Waterloo" on 6 April 1974. During the next eight years, Andersson (together with Ulvaeus) wrote music for and produced eight studio albums with ABBA. The group achieved great success globally and scored a chain of No. 1 hits.

With ABBA, Benny sang lead vocal on only one song – "Suzy-Hang-Around", from the Waterloo album.

=== After ABBA: Chess, Kristina and Mamma Mia! (1983–present) ===
After ABBA, Andersson continued writing music with Ulvaeus. Their first project was the stage musical Chess, written with Tim Rice. The Chess concept album – with vocals by Elaine Paige, Barbara Dickson, Murray Head and Swedes Tommy Körberg and Björn Skifs – was released in October 1984, selling two million copies worldwide. The Paige/Dickson duet "I Know Him So Well" became a major UK No. 1 hit, and Murray Head's "One Night in Bangkok" gave Andersson/Ulvaeus a US No. 3 hit.

Chess was staged in London's West End Prince Edward Theatre in May 1986 and received mixed to positive reviews, running for about three years. A revised staging on Broadway in April 1988 received poor reviews, running for two months.

In 1985, Andersson produced and released an album with brother and sister Anders and Karin Glenmark, featuring new songs by Andersson/Ulvaeus. The duo named themselves Gemini, and a second album with more music by Björn and Benny was released in April 1987, containing the big hit "Mio My Mio"; also to be found on the soundtrack to the film Mio in the Land of Faraway, for which Andersson co-produced the music.

In 1987, Andersson released his first solo album Klinga Mina Klockor ("Chime, My Bells"). All the music was written by and performed by himself on accordion, backed by the Orsa Spelmän (Orsa Folk Musicians) on fiddles. A second solo album followed: November 1989.

In 1990, Andersson scored a Swedish No. 1 hit with "Lassie", sung by female cabaret group Ainbusk, for whom he also wrote the Svensktoppen hits "Älska Mig" and "Drömmarnas Golv". He decided to produce an album with Josefin Nilsson from this quartet, resulting in the 1993 English-language album Shapes, featuring ten new Andersson/Ulvaeus compositions.

In 1992, he wrote the introduction melody for the European football championship, which was organised by Sweden that year.

From the late 1980s, Andersson had worked on an idea for an epic Swedish language musical based on his affection for traditional folk music, and in October 1995, Kristina från Duvemåla premiered in Sweden. The musical was based on The Emigrants novels by Swedish writer Vilhelm Moberg. The musical ran successfully for almost five years, before closing in June 1999. An English-language version, simply titled Kristina, was staged in concert at Carnegie Hall in New York City for two nights in September 2009, yielding a live recording, and at the Royal Albert Hall for one night in April 2010.

Andersson's next project was Mamma Mia!, a musical built around 24 of ABBA's songs, which has become a worldwide box-office blockbuster, with versions in several languages being played in many countries, including the UK (West End premiere in April 1999), Canada (Toronto premiere in 2000), the USA (Broadway premiere in 2001), and Sweden (Swedish language premiere in 2005).

For the 2004 semi-final of the Eurovision Song Contest, staged in Istanbul thirty years after ABBA had won the contest in Brighton, Benny appeared briefly in a special comedy video made for the interval act, entitled "Our Last Video". Each of the four members of the group appeared briefly in cameo roles, as did others such as Cher and Rik Mayall. The video was not included in the official DVD release of the Eurovision Contest, but was issued as a separate DVD release. It was billed as the first time the four had worked together since the group split; however, Frida's appearance was filmed separately.

A film version of Mamma Mia! premiered on 18 July 2008. In April/May 2007, Andersson worked on the film soundtrack, re-recording the ABBA songs with musicians from the original ABBA recording sessions. Mamma Mia! The Movie has become the most successful film musical of all time, and the biggest-selling DVD ever in the UK.

=== Benny Anderssons Orkester (2001–present) ===
Andersson currently performs with his own band of 16 musicians, Benny Anderssons Orkester ("Benny Andersson's orchestra", BAO), with fellow Swedes Helen Sjöholm (of Kristina from Duvemåla) and Tommy Körberg (of Chess), with lyrics to new material sometimes written by Björn Ulvaeus. BAO has released five albums to huge success in Sweden, all containing hit singles.

In 2009 BAO achieved a new record in Sweden on the Svensktoppen chart by staying there for 243 weeks with the song "Du är min man" ("You Are My Man"), sung by Sjöholm.

=== New compositions (1984–present) ===
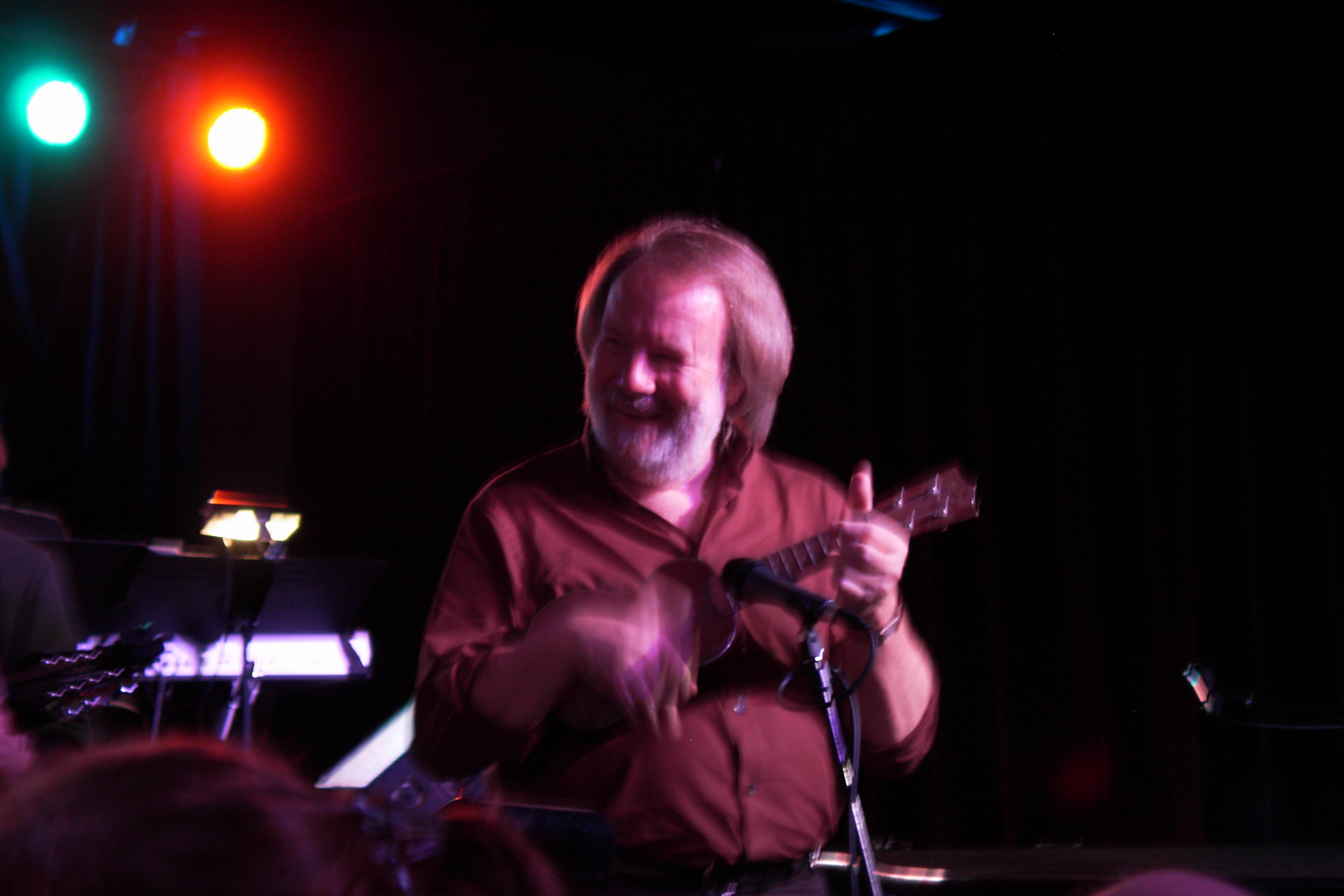
Andersson performing in 2006

Andersson composes primarily for his band BAO, with vocalists Sjöholm and Körberg, but he keeps his older material alive by re-visiting it, as in Mamma Mia! and the Swedish version of Chess.

For a compilation album of the Glenmark duo Gemini, Andersson had Björn Ulvaeus write new Swedish lyrics for the re-recording of two songs from 1984 and 1987.

Andersson and Ulvaeus have continuously been writing new material; most recently the two wrote seven songs for Andersson's BAO 2011 album O klang och jubeltid, performed as usual by vocalists Sjöholm, Körberg and Kalle Moraeus. In July 2009, BAO, now named "The Benny Andersson Band", released their first international record, the album The Story of a Heart. It was a compilation of 14 tracks from Andersson's five Swedish-language releases between 1987 and 2007, including five songs now recorded with lyrics by Ulvaeus in English, and the new title song premiered on BBC2's Ken Bruce Show. A Swedish-language version of the title track, "Sommaren Du Fick" ("The Summer You Got"), was released as a single in Sweden prior to the English version, with vocals by Helen Sjöholm.

In the spring of 2009, Andersson also released a single recorded by the staff at his privately owned Stockholm hotel Hotel Rival, titled "2nd Best to None", accompanied by a video showing the staff at work. In 2008, Andersson and Ulvaeus wrote a song for Swedish singer Sissela Kyle, titled "Jag vill bli gammal" ("I Wanna Grow Old"), for her Stockholm stage show "Your Days Are Numbered", which was never recorded and released but did get a TV performance. Ulvaeus also contributed lyrics to ABBA's 1976 instrumental track "Arrival" for Sarah Brightman's cover version recorded for her 2008 album A Winter Symphony. New English lyrics have also been written for Andersson's 1999 song "Innan Gryningen" (then also named "Millennium Hymn"), with the new title "The Silence of the Dawn" for Barbara Dickson was performed live, but not yet recorded and released. In 2007, they wrote the new song "Han som har vunnit allt" ("He Who's Won It All") for actor and singer Anders Ekborg.

Ulvaeus wrote English lyrics for two older songs from Andersson's solo albums I Walk with You Mama ("Stockholm by Night", 1989) and After the Rain ("Efter regnet", 1987) for opera singer Anne Sofie Von Otter, for her Andersson tribute album I Let the Music Speak. Barbara Dickson recorded an Ulvaeus and Andersson song called "The Day The Wall Came Tumbling Down"; the song eventually was released by Australian Mamma Mia! musical star Anne Wood's album of ABBA covers, Divine Discontent. As of October 2012, Ulvaeus had mentioned writing new material with Andersson for a BAO Christmas release (also mentioned as a BAO box), and Andersson is busy writing music for a Swedish language obscure musical, Hjälp Sökes ("Help is Wanted") together with Kristina Lugn and Lars Rudolfsson, premiering 8 February 2013.

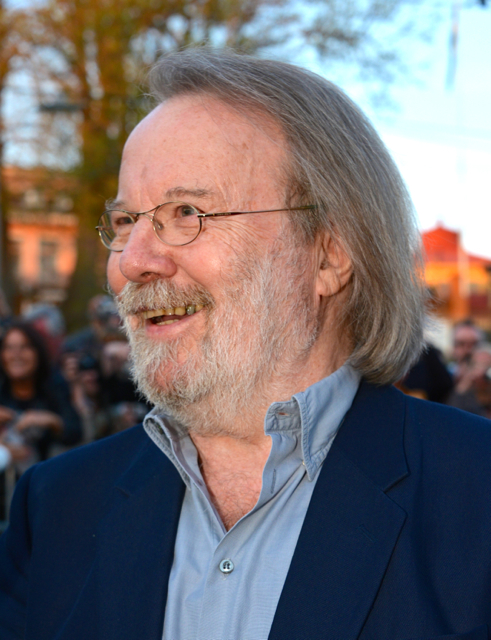
Andersson during the opening of ABBA The Museum in 2013

Andersson has also written music for a documentary film about Olof Palme, re-recording the track "Sorgmarch" from his last album as a theme throughout the film. The song "Saknadens rum and Kärlekens Tid", recorded 2004 by Helen Sjöholm with BAO, has also been performed in concert in English (lyrics by Ylva Eggehorn) by opera baritone Bryn Terfel. On 15 April 2013, it was officially announced by the EBU and the SVT that Andersson, along with Ulvaeus and the late Stockholm based DJ and record producer Avicii, had composed the anthem for the Eurovision Song Contest 2013. The song was performed for the first time in the Final on 18 May.

A new album of Andersson compositions presented in a choral style was released on 18 September 2015. "Kärlekens Tid" was produced in Andersson's Mono Music studio, under the direction of choirmaster Gustaf Sjökvist, who died before the album's release. Gustaf Sjökvists Choir, conducted by Cecilia Rydinger Alin, performed two concerts at Skeppsholmen on 20 September, featuring Benny Andersson on piano. The album includes songs in Swedish and English from a range of Andersson's projects, such as Chess, Kristina and BAO.

In November 2018, Deutsche Grammophon released Piano, a collection of ABBA tunes, tunes from Chess and original compositions, such as The Day Before You Came, all played by Andersson on solo piano.

Andersson reunited with ABBA in 2018. On 2 September 2021, via YouTube livestream, ABBA announced their upcoming virtual concert residency "ABBA Voyage", as well as the imminent release of an eponymous album, recorded between 2017 and 2021. The new record, their first studio album in 40 years, features ten tracks, including "I Still Have Faith In You" and "Don't Shut Me Down", which also were first shown in the aforementioned livestream event and released as two singles. On 5 November 2021, the Voyage album was released worldwide. On 27 May 2022, ABBA Voyage opened in a purpose-built venue named the ABBA Arena at the Queen Elizabeth Olympic Park in London.

=== Film music ===
Andersson has written music to several films for screen and television; the first attempt in the early 1970s for the Swedish erotica movie The Seduction of Inga; the film was not a success, but the 'Björn & Benny' single "She's My Kind of Girl" surprised the composers by being released in Japan and becoming a Top 10 hit (the song renamed in Japan as "The Little Girl of the Cold Wind").

In 1987, Andersson wrote music and co-produced the soundtrack with Anders Eljas for the film Mio in the Land of Faraway, based on Swedish author Astrid Lindgrens Mio, My Son. The title song became a huge hit in Sweden for Gemini.

In 2000, he wrote the music for fellow Swede (no relation) Roy Andersson's film Songs from the Second Floor (the music later re-recorded, featuring new lyrics, with BAO! with vocals by Helen Sjöholm). He also wrote the theme for Roy Andersson's next film, You, the Living, from 2007.

Andersson worked on the film adaptation of Mamma Mia!. He also wrote the film score for the 2012 documentary Palme about Swedish prime minister Olof Palme. He later won a Guldbagge Award for Best Original Score, for that film at the 48th Guldbagge Awards.

== Awards ==
- Sweden: Commander 1st Class of the Royal Order of Vasa (21 March 2024)

Together with Ulvaeus, Andersson was nominated for a Drama Desk Award in a category "Outstanding Music" (for the musical Chess), and for a Tony Award in a category "Best Orchestrations" (for musical Mamma Mia!). Original cast recordings of both musicals were nominated for a Grammy Award. Andersson/Ulvaeus also won a Touring Broadway Award for the musical "Mamma Mia" (best score).

During his post-ABBA career Andersson won four Swedish Grammis awards, and together with Ulvaeus received the "Special International" Ivor Novello award from 'The British Academy of Composers and Songwriters', twice "The Music Export Prize" from the Swedish Ministry of Industry and Trade (2008), as well as the "Lifetime Achievement" award from the Swedish Music Publishers Association (SMFF). In 2002, Andersson was given an honorary professorship by the Swedish Government for his "ability to create high-class music reaching people around the world".

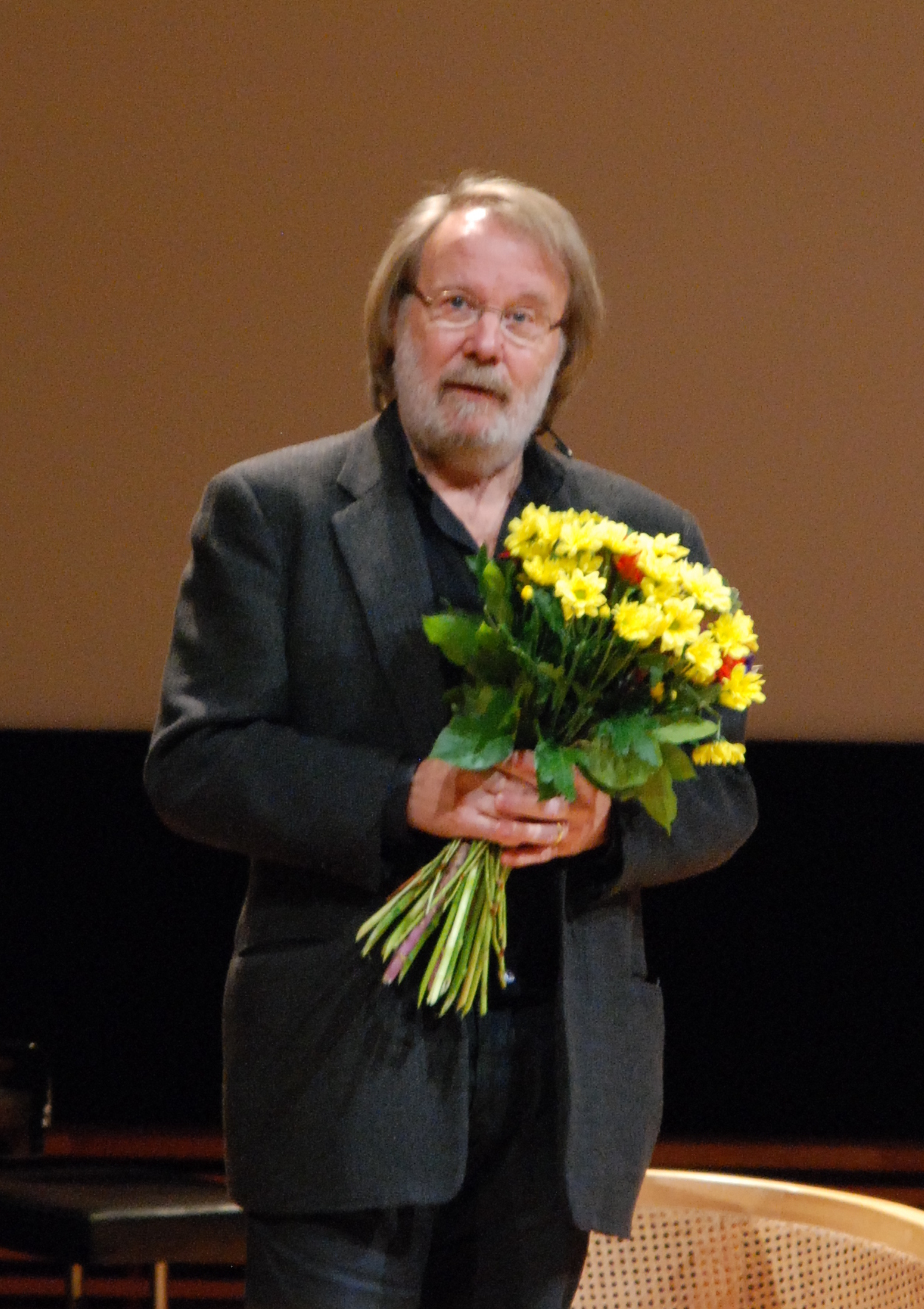
Andersson at Stockholm University in 2008

In 2007, he was elected a member of Royal Swedish Academy of Music, and in 2008 received an Honorary Doctorate from the Stockholm University Faculty of Humanities for contributing importantly both to the preservation and the growth of the Swedish folk music tradition.

On 15 March 2010, Andersson appeared on stage in New York with former wife Anni-Frid Lyngstad to accept ABBA's award of induction into the Rock and Roll Hall of Fame. During his acceptance speech he reflected on the important influence of traditional European music and the melancholy of the Swedish soul on ABBA's brand of pop music. "If you live in a country like Sweden, with five, six months of snow, and the sun disappears totally for like two months, that would be reflected in the work of artists," he said. "It's definitely in the Swedish folk music, you can hear it in the Russian folk songs, you can hear in the music from Jean Sibelius or Edvard Grieg from Norway, you can see it in the eyes of Greta Garbo and you can hear it in the voice of Jussi Björling. And you can hear in the sound of Frida and Agnetha on some of our songs too."

In 2012, he received an Honorary Doctorate of Philosophy from the Luleå Tekniska Universitet Faculty of Humanities and Social Sciences.

Andersson won the Swedish "Guldbaggen" award in 2012 as composer of the music for the film "Palme".

For his album Piano he received the Opus Klassik award in 2018.

On 21 March 2024, shortly before the 50th anniversary of their win at the Eurovision Song Contest, all four members of ABBA were appointed Commander, First Class, of the Royal Order of Vasa by His Majesty King Carl XVI Gustaf of Sweden. This was the first time in almost 50 years that the Swedish Royal Orders of Knighthood was bestowed on Swedes. ABBA shared the honour with nine other persons.

== Personal life ==
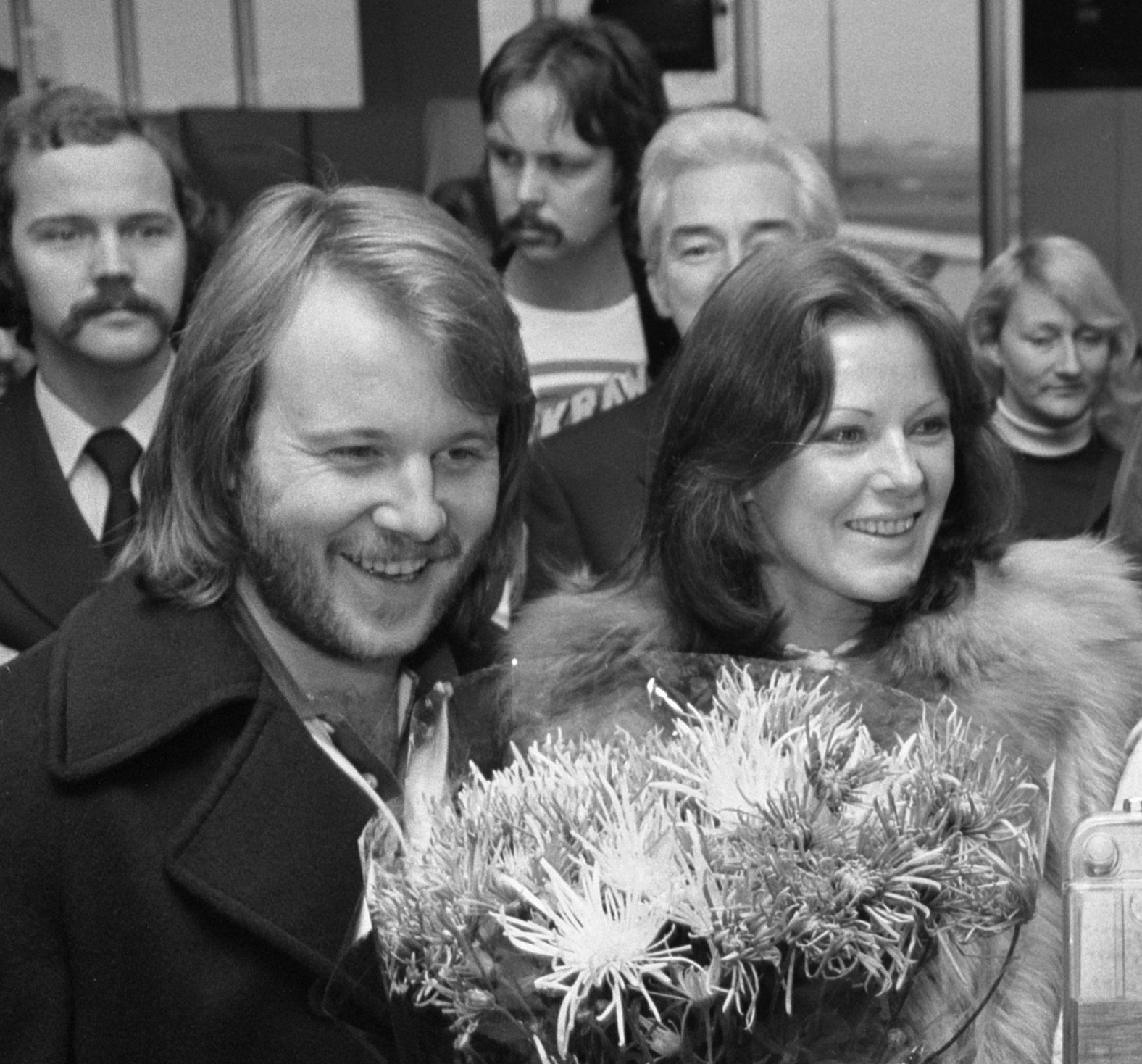
Andersson with Lyngstad in 1976

Andersson was engaged to Christina Grönvall. They have two children. The couple split in 1966 and Christina kept custody of the children as Andersson was then at the peak of his Hep Stars' success. In the 1990s, their son Peter Grönvall formed One More Time, a group that enjoyed European success with the ABBA-like "Highland" and, later, as Sweden's entry to the Eurovision Song Contest 1996.

Andersson was in a relationship with Anni-Frid Lyngstad of ABBA for about 11 years, from 1969 till 1980. They married on 6 October 1978, but separated on 26 November 1980 and divorced in 1981.

He married Swedish TV presenter Mona Nörklit in 1981 and had a son, Ludvig, who is one of the producers of the concert residency ABBA Voyage as well as the 2025 Broadway revival of Chess. Ludvig and his father are co-owners of the studio Riksmixningsverket, or RMV Studios, also called the National Institutional Department of Mixing. Located in a 150-year-old naval warehouse on the island of Skeppsholmen in Stockholm, the studio opened in 2011.

Andersson was an alcoholic through much of his adult life. He has remained a teetotaler since 2001. Andersson did not disclose the extent of his substance abuse problems until a 2011 interview, at which point he had maintained nearly a decade of sobriety.

== Musicals ==
- 1984: Chess
- 1995: Kristina från Duvemåla
- 1999: Mamma Mia!
- 2013: Hjälp sökes
- 2022: Pippi på Cirkus

== Also appears on ==
- Beginner's Guide to Scandinavia (3CD, Nascente 2011)

== See also ==
- List of Swedes in music

Awards and achievements
Preceded by (Luxembourg) Anne-Marie David with "Tu te reconnaîtras"	Winner of the Eurovision Song Contest; 1974 (as part of ABBA)	Succeeded by (Netherlands) Teach-In with "Ding-A-Dong"
Preceded by Nova with "You're Summer"	Sweden in the Eurovision Song Contest; 1974 (as part of ABBA)	Succeeded by Lars Berghagen with "Jennie, Jennie"
