= Mio My Mio (song) =

Single by Gemini
- B-side: "Beat the Heat"
- Released: 1987
- Studio: Polar Studios
- Label: Polar
- Songwriters: Benny Andersson; Björn Ulvaeus

"Mio My Mio" (Swedish: "Mio min Mio") is a song performed by Swedish group Gemini for the 1987 film Mio in the Land of Faraway. The song was composed by Benny Andersson and Björn Ulvaeus. The lyrics exist in both English, Swedish and Russian versions.

In 1987, Gemini released the song as a single and as part of their album Geminism. It became a hit in Sweden, with the single staying in the top ten for 5 weeks and peaking at number 3.

In 1987 and 1988, CBS Records released the soundtrack of Mio in the Land of Faraway on LP and CD. "Mio My Mio" was included as a track in these releases.

== Chart performance ==
The single stayed in the Swedish Top List for six weeks, stayed in the top ten for five weeks and peaked at number 3.

Chart (1987–1988)	Peak position
Sweden (Sverigetopplistan)	3
