= Bruno Glenmark =

Swedish musician, music executive

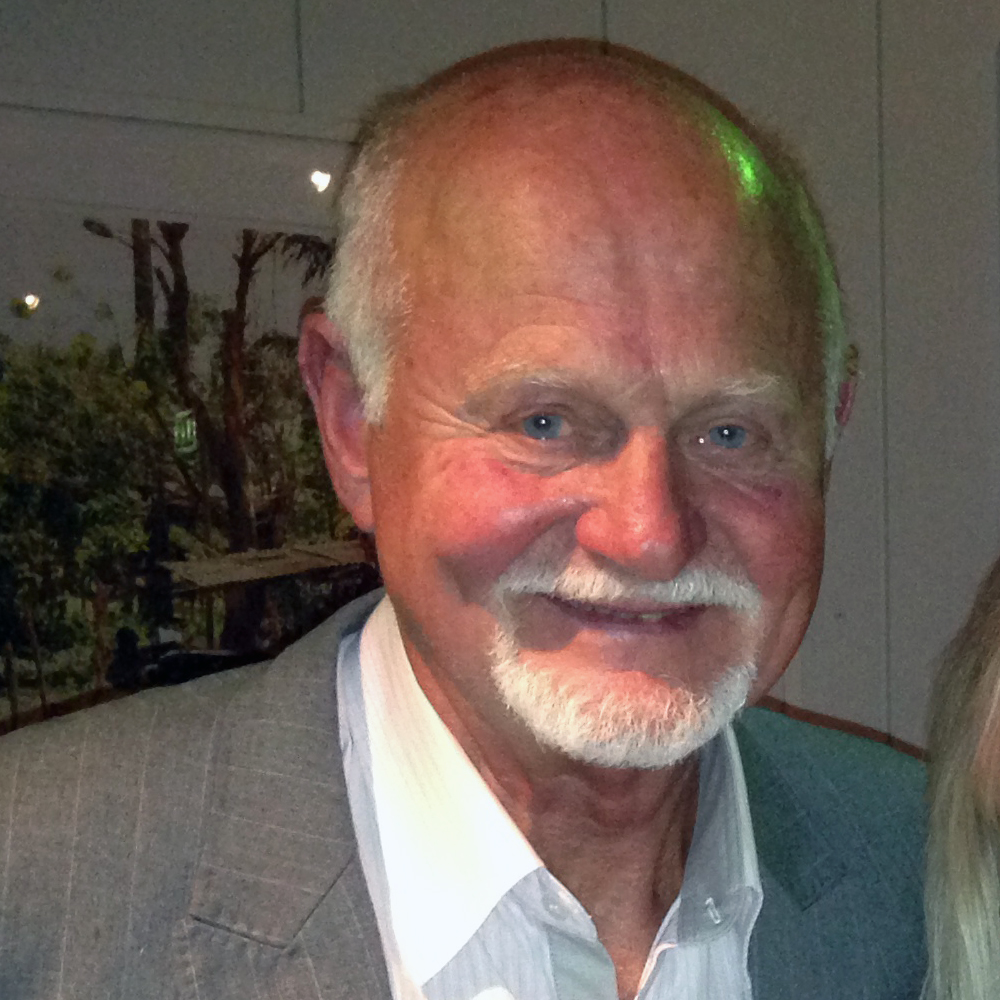
- Bruno Glenmark in Malmö in 2014

Background information
- Born: 17 March 1938 (age 88); Tomelilla, Sweden
- Genres: Pop
- Occupations: Singer, band leader

Alf Göran Bruno Glenmark (born 17 March 1938) is a Swedish musician, songwriter, band leader, and singer. He was born in Tomelilla.

== Music career ==
During the 1960s, Glenmark toured Sweden with his own band and soloist Eleanor Bodel. With his wife Ann-Louise Hanson, niece Karin Glenmark and nephew Anders Glenmark, in the 1970s, he formed the family group Glenmarks. Their first big success was Gammaldags musik, for which Bruno Glenmark also wrote the lyrics. With Hanson, Glenmark had his own record label, GlenDisc, from 1972 to 1990.

=== Melodifestivalen ===
Bruno Glenmark has taken part in the Swedish Eurovision Song Contest selection competition Melodifestivalen on several occasions, as a songwriter, conductor and singer.

- 1969 – conductor for Svenska flicka by Ann-Louise Hanson (finished 4th).
- 1973 – En liten sång (som alla andra) by Glenmarks (finished 4th).
- 1974 – I annorlunda land by Glenmark (finished 8th).
- 1975 – conductor for Lady Antoinette by Hadar Kronberg and Glenmarks (finished 6th).
- 1977 – conductor for Det bästa som finns by Lena Andersson (finished 8th).
- 1979 – conductor for On jag skriver en sång by Eva Dahlgren (finished joint 3rd).
- 1984 – composer of Tjuvarnas natt by Thomas Lewing (finished joint 6th place).
- 1985 – lyrics for Piccadilly Circus by Pernilla Wahlgren (finished 4th).
- 1988 – lyrics for I en ding ding värld by Annica Burman (finished 6th).

== Personal life ==
The surname Glenmark was adopted in 1945. Since 1966, Bruno Glenmark has been married to the singer Ann-Louise Hanson. They have three daughters: Jessica, Jenni and Josefin Glenmark. He is the uncle of Karin and Anders Glenmark. After giving up GlenDisc in 1990, Glenmark and Hanson moved to Grasse in France. In 2010, they returned to Sweden.
