= Herreys =

Swedish pop and schlager trio

- Origin: Sweden
- Genres: Pop
- Years active: 1984–present
- Label: Various
- Members: Per Herrey; Richard Herrey; Louis Herrey

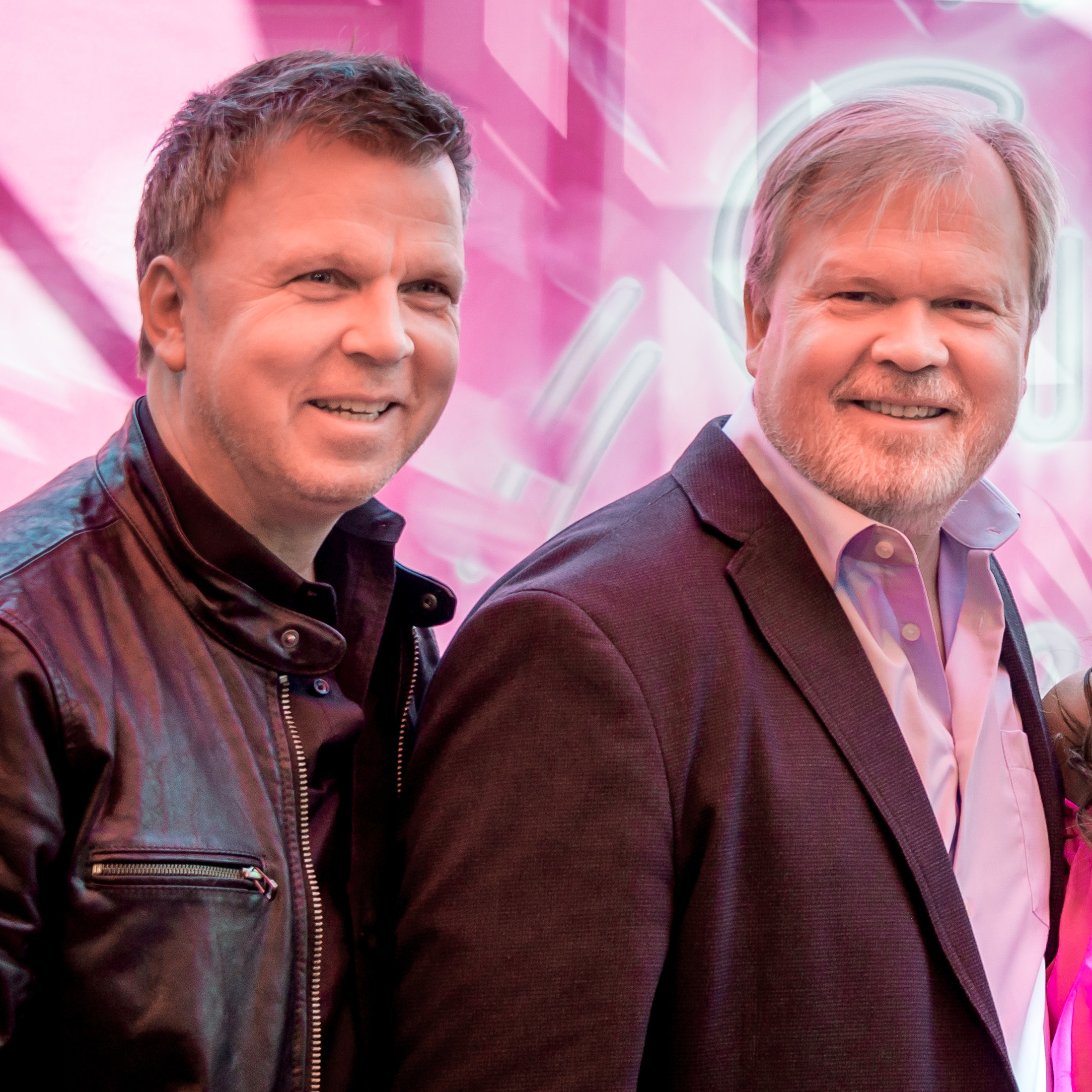
Two of the brothers (Richard and Per) in 2016

Herreys (Swedish pronunciation: [hɛˈrɛjs]), sometimes Herrey's or Herrey, is a Swedish pop group, consisting of the three brothers Per Herrey (born 9 August 1958), Richard Herrey (born 19 August 1964), and Louis Herrey (born 3 November 1966). They won the Eurovision Song Contest 1984 with the song "Diggi-Loo Diggi-Ley". Richard and Louis Herrey became the first teenage males to win Eurovision and remain the youngest-ever male winners, at 19 years and 260 days and 17 years and 184 days of age, respectively. In 1985, they won the Sopot International Song Festival with "Sommarparty". At the time of their Eurovision win, the brothers were living and working as singers in Cleveland, Ohio, United States. Herreys continued to record and tour for a few years, but had no hits of the same magnitude as the Eurovision winner. Herreys was the bestselling pop group in Sweden in the 1980s, and toured successfully, performing over 300 live shows.

The three brothers reunited to perform "Diggi-Loo Diggi-Ley" in the intermission of one of the Swedish Melodifestivalen semifinals of 2002. Richard Herrey made an appearance at Congratulations, a 50th anniversary concert, held in Copenhagen, Denmark in October 2005. In February 2006, Richard Herrey released his first solo album, Jag e Kung. They performed at Eurovision Song Contest's Greatest Hits, the 60th anniversary show in 2015, and also at the end of the second semi-final of the Eurovision Song Contest 2024 in Malmö, Sweden.

== Discography ==
=== Albums ===
- 1984: Diggi Loo, Diggi Ley
- 1985: Crazy People
- 1985: Not Funny
- 1986: Different I's
- 1987: Live in Tivoli
- 1994: Där vindarna möts
- 1995: Herreys Story
- 2002: Gyllene Hits
- 2010: The Greatest Hits

=== Singles ===
- "Crazy people" / "I'm so sorry"
- "You" / "I see the love"
- "Kall som is" / "Mirror mirror"
  - (#18 in Sweden) (1984)
- "Diggi-Loo-Diggi-Ley" (1984)
  - (#2 in Sweden, #3 in Belgium, #4 in Finland, #5 in the Netherlands and Norway, #10 in Switzerland, #11 in Germany, #18 in Denmark, #46 in UK)
- "People say it's in the air" / "I'm so sorry"
- "Varje liten droppe regn" (EP)
  - (#11 in Sweden)
- "People from Ibiza" / "Sommarparty"
  - (#20 in Sweden)
- "Din telefon" / "Why Why"
- "Chinese Temptation" / "Sweet Love"
- "Freedom" / "Little Pretty Girl"
- "Min ensamma vrå" / "Livet i dig"
- "Öppna dina ögon" / "Hanna"
- "Här vill jag leva" / "Hon ger dig allt"
- "Sing a Song"

Awards and achievements
Preceded by (Luxembourg) Corinne Hermès with "Si la vie est cadeau"	Winner of the Eurovision Song Contest; 1984	Succeeded by (Norway) Bobbysocks with "La det swinge"
Preceded by Carola with "Främling"	Sweden in the Eurovision Song Contest; 1984	Succeeded by Kikki Danielsson with "Bra vibrationer"
Preceded by (Poland) Krystyna Giżowska with "Blue Box"	Winner of Sopot Music Festival Grand Prix; 1985	Succeeded by (United States) Mara Getz with "Hero Of My Heart"
