= Anders Glenmark =

Swedish singer, songwriter, musician and actor (born 1953)

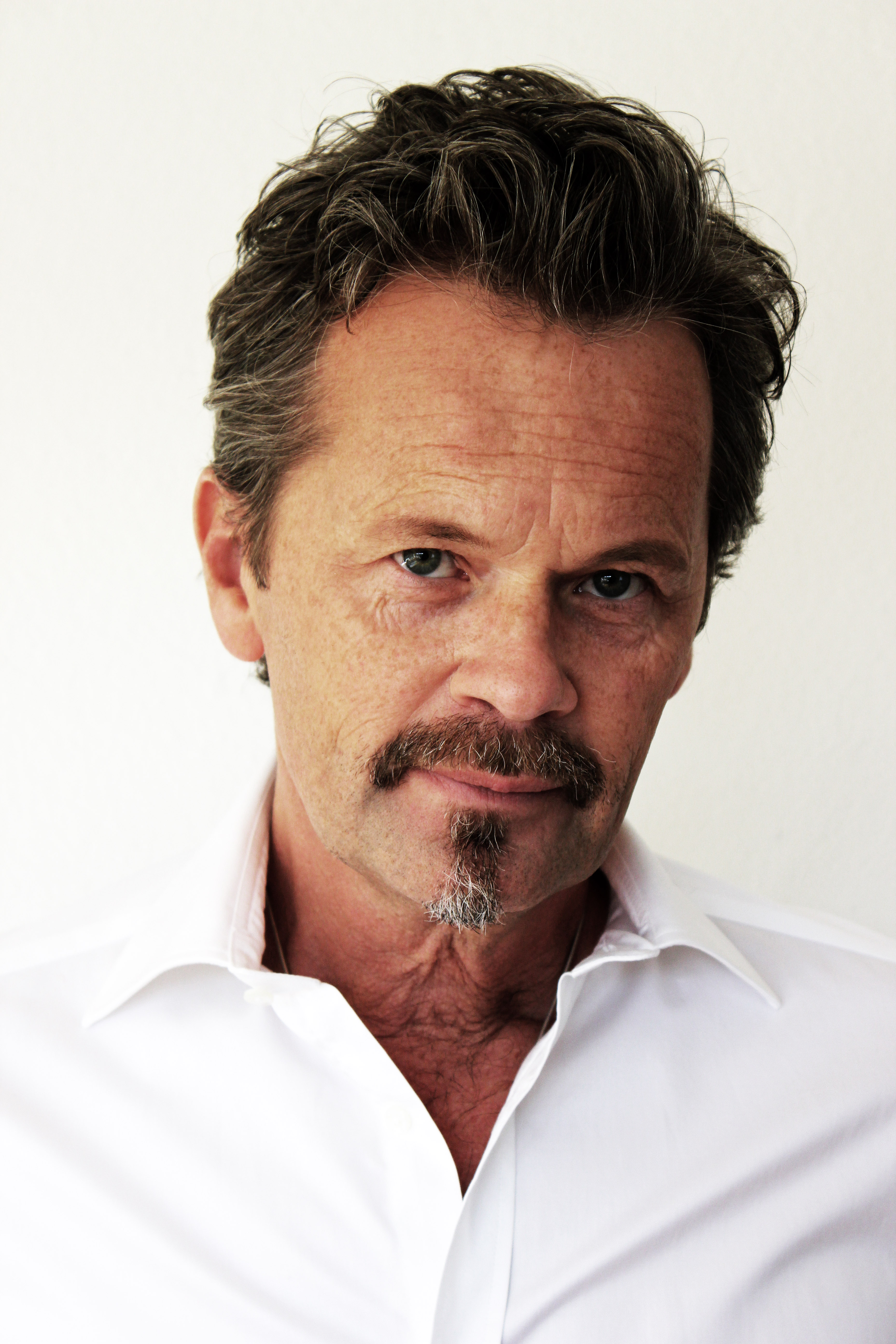
- Glenmark in 2011
- Born: Gert Anders Glenmark; 20 November 1953 (age 72); Simrishamn, Sweden
- Occupations: Singer; songwriter; musician; record producer
- Years active: 1972–2002; 2015–present
- Relatives: Karin Glenmark (sister)
- Musical career
- Genres: Rock; pop
- Instruments: Vocals; bass guitar; guitar
- Labels: Metronome; Polar
- Formerly of: Glenmarks

Gert Anders Glenmark (born 20 November 1953) is a Swedish singer, songwriter, musician and record producer. He is the brother of singer Karin Glenmark and nephew of band leader Bruno Glenmark.

== Career ==
Among the artists for whom Glenmark has written and produced are Eva Dahlgren, Orup, Ted Gärdestad, and Patrik Isaksson. He has also, early on in his career, been a backing singer on solo albums by members of ABBA, such as Anni-Frid Lyngstad's Frida Ensam and Agnetha Fältskog's Elva Kvinnor I Ett Hus, both released in 1975.

In 1976, Glenmark played lead guitar in Abba's hit single "Money, Money, Money".

In 1984, Glenmark sang, multi-tracked, all the voices on the chorus of Murray Head's hit single "One Night in Bangkok" (US No. 3, UK #12), from the Benny Andersson/Tim Rice/Björn Ulvaeus musical Chess.

In 1996, Glenmark produced and co-wrote Anni-Frid "Frida" Lyngstad's Swedish solo album Djupa Andetag. He has also collaborated with a number of Danish artists such as Lis Sørensen and Søs Fenger.

Glenmark has been a member of several groups, including the family group Glenmarks and the siblings duo Gemini. Since 1994, he has been a member of the sporadically existing group Glenmark Eriksson Strömstedt (GES) together with Orup and Niklas Strömstedt.

Glenmark has participated in Melodifestivalen, the Swedish heats of the Eurovision Song Contest, seven times:

- 1973 as part of Glenmarks with the song "En liten sång som alla andra" (4th place)
- 1974 as part of Glenmarks with the song "I annorlunda land" (8th place)
- 1975 as part of Glenmarks with the song "Lady Antoinette" (6th place)
- 1981 with the song "Det är mitt liv – det är jag" (4th place)
- 1984 with his sister Karin Glenmark (before this duo became known as Gemini) with the song "Kall som is" (4th place)
- 1989 with Orup with the song "Upp över mina öron" (2nd place)
- 2006 As a songwriter with Niklas Strömstedt with the song "Lev Livet"

== Discography ==
=== Albums ===
- Känslor (1973)
- Anders Glenmark! (1975)
- Express (1977)
- Det är mitt liv – det är jag (1981)
- Här går en man (1988)
- Jag finns här för dig (1990)
- Jag finns här för dig (1990)
- Boogie i mitt huvud (1993)
- Glenmark (1997)
- Alla dessa bilder (2002)

=== Singles ===
- 2002 – "Låt det komma ut" (with Patrik Isaksson)
- 2002 – "Lust och välbehag"
- 2000 – "Kom karavaner" (with Søs Fenger)
- 1997 – "Lätt som en fjäder"
- 1997 – "Leva länge"
- 1997 – "I min säng"
- 1993 – "Boogie i mitt huvud"
- 1993 – "Högre standard"
- 1993 – "Bygg på mig"
- 1992 – "Mare Mare"
- 1991 – "Anna dansar"
- 1991 – "Greyhound Bus"
- 1990 – "Hon sa"
- 1990 – "Hon har blommor i sitt hår"
- 1989 – "Prinsessor bor någon annanstans"
- 1989 – "Upp över mina öron" (with Orup)
- 1988 – "Vill du resa i vår, så reser jag med dig"
- 1988 – "Bröllopet"
- 1988 – "Här går en man"
- 1984 – "One Night in Bangkok" (sings main chorus)
- 1984 – "Kall som is" (with Karin Glenmark)
- 1981 – "Det är mitt liv – det är jag"
- 1977 – "Falling Star"
- 1975 – "Sextitalslivet"
- 1974 – "Hur går det till" (with Karin Glenmark)
- 1973 – "Det både känns och bränns"
- 1973 – "Marianne Marianne"
- 1972 – "Någon gång, Någonstans"

== Bibliography ==
- "Anders Glenmark". Nationalencyklopedin (in Swedish).
