= För den som älskar - en samling =

Compilation album by Shirley Clamp
- Released: 25 March 2009
- Recorded: 2003–2009
- Genre: pop, schlager
- Label: Lionheart

Shirley Clamp chronology
| Tålamod (2007) | För den som älskar - en samling (2009) |

För den som älskar - en samling is a Shirley Clamp compilation album, released on 25 March 2009.

== Track listing ==
1. "För den som älskar"
2. "Med hjärtat fyllt av ljus"
3. "Det finns inga givna svar"
4. "Jag tar en annan väg"
5. "Lever mina drömmar"
6. "Mina minnen"
7. "Du är allt"
8. "Aldrig"
9. "Min kärlek"
10. "Att älska dig"
11. "Eviga längtan"
12. "Längtan är allt jag har"
13. "När kärleken föds" ("It Must Have Been Love")
14. "Tålamod"
15. "Mr. Memory"
16. "Jag fick låna en ängel"
17. "I dina ögon"
18. "Ingenting finns kvar"
19. "Som en saga"
20. "Miracle" ("Att älska dig")
21. "My Love Light" ("Min kärlek")
- "Miracle" is an English version of "Att älska dig," while "My Love Light" is an English version of "Min kärlek."
- "När kärleken föds" and "I dina ögon" are covers of the Roxette song "It Must Have Been Love" and the Cyndi Lauper song "True Colors", respectively.

== Charts ==
| Chart (2009) | Peak position |
|---|---|
| Sweden (Sverigetopplistan) | 11 |
