= Till dig =

Studio album by Sonja Aldén
- Released: 25 April 2007
- Recorded: 2007
- Genre: Pop, Schlager
- Length: 48:28
- Label: Lionheart International
- Producer: Jörgen Ingeström, Bobby Ljunggren, Bo Reimer, Henrik Wikström

Sonja Aldén chronology
Till dig (2007)	Under mitt tak (2008)

Till dig is Swedish singer Sonja Aldén's debut studio album. It was released on 25 April 2007. Aldén wrote or co-wrote all the songs, except for "Det är inte regn som faller". She wrote "Hjälte utan mod", "Om du vill", "Vila tryggt", "Till en ängel" and "Du är allt" on her own.

== Track listing ==
1. Här står jag (Here I stand)
2. För att du finns (Because you exist)
3. Två dagar på en öde strand (Two days on a deserted beach)
4. Egen tid (One's time)
5. Hjälte utan mod (Heroes without courage)
6. Där kärleken bor (There love lives)
7. Om du vill (If you want)
8. Det är inte regn som faller (It is not the rain which falls)
9. Skratt genom tårar (Tears through joy)
10. Vila tryggt (Secured rest)
11. Till en ängel (To an angel)
12. Du är allt (You are everything) (duet with Shirley Clamp)
13. För att du finns (Because you exist) (Acoustic version)

== Charts ==
Chart (2007)	Peak position
Swedish Albums (Sverigetopplistan)	2
