= Att älska dig =

Single by Shirley Clamp

from the album Lever mina drömmar
- Released: 2005
- Genre: Pop; schlager
- Songwriters: Robert Olausson; Sonja Aldén; Bobby Ljunggren; Henrik Wikström

Shirley Clamp singles chronology
"Do They Know It's Christmas?" (2004)	"Att älska dig" (2005)	"Mina minnen" (2005)

"Att älska dig" is a song written by Robert Olausson, Sonja Aldén, Bobby Ljunggren and Henrik Wikström, and performed by Shirley Clamp at Melodifestivalen 2005, where the song reached fourth place.

Shirley Clamp also recorded the song in English, as Miracle, on her 2009 compilation album För den som älskar - en samling.

During a parody pause act during Melodifestivalen 2009, Shirley Clamp performed the song pretending to be a cashier woman, sitting at checkout singing a chicken.

== Single release ==
The single peaked at number four on the Swedish singles chart. The song was also tested for Svensktoppen, staying at the chart for 10 times during the period 1 May-3 July 2005, with two fourth places as peak positions.

== Charts ==
Chart (2005)	Peak position
Sweden (Sverigetopplistan)	4
