= Det är inte regn som faller =

Single by Sonja Aldén

from the album Till dig
- Released: 1 November 2007
- Genre: schlager
- Label: Lionheart International
- Songwriters: Ingela Forsman, Bobby Ljunggren, Henrik Wikström

Sonja Aldén singles chronology
"Här står jag" (2007)	"Det är inte regn som faller" (2007)	"Nån som du" (2008)

"Det är inte regn som faller" is a ballad song with lyrics by Ingela "Pling" Forsman, and music by Bobby Ljunggren and Henrik Wikström, and recorded by Swedish singer Sonja Aldén on her 2007 album Till dig. The single was released for digital download on 1 November 2007, on the Lionheart International record label. The song charted at Svensktoppen, where it stayed for five weeks between 30 December 2007-27 January 2008, peaking at 6th position before leaving the chart.
