= En så'n natt =

En så’n natt

Studio album by Zekes
- Released: 27 January 2010
- Genre: Dansband music
- Length: 50:58
- Label: Kavalkad

Zekes chronology
En så’n natt (2010)	Vi lyfter igen (2011)

En så’n natt is the debut studio album by Swedish dansband Zekes. It was released in 2010.

== Track listing ==
#	Title	Writer	Length
1.	"Aj, aj, aj"	Rune Wallebom	2.47
2.	"I ett fönster"	Kent Liljefjäll, Marcus Persson	2.59
3.	"Hallå"	Torgny Söderberg	2.38
4.	"Hope & Glory"	Fredrik Kempe, Henrik Wikström, Måns Zelmerlöw	3.06
5.	"En så'n natt"	Thomas G:sson, Stefan Brunzell	2.48
6.	"Tennessee Waltz" (duet with Anne-Lie Rydé)	Redd Stewart, Pee Wee King	3.27
7.	"Hi-Ho Rock'n Roll"	Kurt Westling, Herbert Trus	3.01
8.	"Om du undrar hur jag mår"	Kent Liljefjäll, Marcus Persson	4.24
9.	"Ögon i natten"	Thomas G:son, Henrik Sethsson	3.41
10.	"Öppna din dörr"	Tommy Nilsson	3.54
11.	"Får jag följa med dig hem"	Thomas Thörnholm, Danne Attlerud, Michael Clauss	3.27
12.	"Jag tror på dig"	Isura Fernando, Karl-Ola S. Kjellholm, Ulf Georgsson	3.43
13.	"Ensammas promenad"	Lasse Holm, Gert Lengstrand	3.30
14.	"Victoria"	Kent Liljefjäll, Marcus Persson	3.11
15.	"Ett liv utan dig"	Ingemar Åberg, Christian Antblad	3.30

== Charts ==
=== Weekly charts ===
Chart (2010)	Peak position
Swedish Albums (Sverigetopplistan)	3

=== Year-end charts ===
Chart (2010)	Position
Swedish Albums (Sverigetopplistan)	81
