= Här står jag =

Single by Sonja Aldén

from the album Till dig
- Released: 13 June 2007
- Genre: schlager
- Label: Lionheart International
- Songwriters: Sonja Aldén, Bobby Ljunggren, Henrik Wikström
- Producer: Henrik Wikström

Sonja Aldén singles chronology
"För att du finns" (2007)	"Här står jag" (2007)	"Det är inte regn som faller" (2007)

"Här står jag" is a song written by Sonja Aldén, Bobby Ljunggren and Henrik Wikström, and released on 13 June 2007 as a single from Swedish singer Sonja Aldén's 2007 debut album Till dig. The single was released on the record label Lionheart International, and became her third single. Henrik Wikström was also the producer, and the single also consists of a live recording from the release party at Obaren in Stockholm, Sweden, as well as a singback version.

The single peaked at number 16 on the Swedish Singles Chart and also charted at Svensktoppen, where it stayed for three weeks between 2-16 September 2007 before leaving the chart.

== Charts ==
Chart (2007)	Peak position
Sweden (Sverigetopplistan)	16
