= Öppna din dörr =

Single by Tommy Nilsson

from the album En kvinnas man
- B-side: "Nu ger jag mig av"
- Released: 1994
- Genre: Soft rock
- Label: Alpha
- Songwriter: Tommy Nilsson
- Producer: Lasse Englund

"Öppna din dörr" (English: "Open your door") is a song written by Tommy Nilsson, and released as a single from his 1994 studio album, En kvinnas man. The single peaked at number 2 in Sweden and number 10 in Norway. On the Eurochart Hot 100, "Öppna din dörr" reached number 45. It also became a Svensktoppen hit, charting for 24 weeks between 18 June-26 November 1994, topping the chart. It was also appointed "Svensktoppen song of the year 1994". The song became a Trackslistan hit as well.

Shirley Clamp recorded the song for her 2006 album "Favoriter på svenska" and it also acted as a B-side for her single "När kärleken föds" ("It Must Have Been Love"), released 26 April 2006.

A Danny Saucedo recording peaked at 24th position at the Swedish singles chart.

In 2010, the song was recorded by Zekes on the album En så'n natt.

In 2016 Jill Johnson performed the song in English, as "Open Your Heart", during Så mycket bättre.

== Charts ==
=== Tommy Nilsson ===
Chart (1994–2006)	Peak position
Europe (Eurochart Hot 100)	45
Norway (VG-lista)	10
Sweden (Sverigetopplistan)	2

=== Danny Saucedo ===
Chart (2006)	Peak position
Sweden (Sverigetopplistan)	24
