= Ännu doftar kärlek (album) =

Studio album by Curt Haagers
- Released: 1985
- Genre: dansband music
- Label: Mariann Records

Curt Haagers chronology
Adiago (1984)	Ännu doftar kärlek (1985)	Curt Haagers -87 (1986)

Ännu doftar kärlek is a 1985 Curt Haagers studio album. It peaked at No. 36 in the Swedish albums chart.

== Track listing ==
1. Ännu doftar kärlek
2. Barndomstiden (Han har öppnat pärleporten)
3. Romance de amor (Du är den ende)
4. Krasch bang bom och pang
5. Med dej i mina armar
6. Hör min sång Violetta (Violetta, based on a Giuseppe Verdi theme)
7. Hon tror på mej (She Believes in Me)
8. Sista dansen (Love is in Your Eyes)
9. Här är vi (Live is Life)
10. La novia (bröllopet)
11. Det bor en ängel i dej
12. Om du vill (Young and Beautiful)
13. Du och jag (Au revoir madeleine)
14. Der rattenfänger (köp ringar)

== Charts ==
Chart (1985)	Peak position
Sweden	36
