= En spännande dag för Josefine (album) =

Studio album by Curt Haagers
- Released: 1982
- Genre: Dansband music
- Label: Mariann Records

Curt Haagers chronology
Dansa kvack kvack (1981)	En spännande dag för Josefine (1982)	Guld och gröna skogar (1983)

En spännande dag för Josefine is a 1982 Curt Haagers studio album. It peaked at number 36 in the Swedish albums chart.

== Track listing ==
1. En spännande dag för Josefine
2. Aldrig nå'nsin glömmer jag dej
3. En gammal man och ett hav (Der alte Mann und das Meer)
4. Gloryland
5. Öppna landskap (based on: Hör hur västanvinden susar)
6. Var ska vi sova i natt baby (Sara perche ti amo)
7. Det är sången om dej (La Paloma)
8. Göta kanal (Einmal verliebt immer verliebt)
9. Boeves psalm
10. Att dansa med dej
11. Låt kärleken slå rot
12. Ta de' lugnt (By the Light of the Silvery Moon)
13. Godnatt Irene (Goodnight Irene)

== Chart positions ==
Chart (1982–1983)	Peak position
Sweden (Sverigetopplistan)	35
