= Mina minnen =

Single by Shirley Clamp

from the album Lever mina drömmar
- Released: 8 June 2005
- Genre: pop
- Label: Lionheart International
- Songwriter: Lotta Ahlin

Shirley Clamp singles chronology
"Att älska dig" (2005)	"Mina minnen" (2005)	"Lite som du" (2005)

"Mina minnen" is a song written by Lotta Ahlin, and recorded by Shirley Clamp on her 2005 studio album "Lever mina drömmar", as well as being released as a single the same year. The song lyrics deal with a girl being disappointed when her father leaves the family.

The song charted at Svensktoppen for five weeks between 21 August,-18 September 2005 before leaving the chart, peaking at number seven on 11 September 2005.
