= Öppna landskap =

Song by Ulf Lundell

from the album Kär och galen
- Language: Swedish
- Released: 1982
- Genre: Rock
- Label: Sweetheart
- Songwriter: Ulf Lundell
- Composer: Ulf Lundell

"Öppna landskap" is a song written by Ulf Lundell, and recorded by him on the 1982 album Kär och galen.

Back in the 1980s, some people wanted to turn it into the national anthem of Sweden.

The song was also recorded by Curt Haagers on the 1982 album En spännande dag för Josefine, and Simons on the album "Novelty Accordion".

The song couldn't chart at Svensktoppen, as the programme was taken off air between June 1982 and October 1985. However, in November 2017 the song was voted into the chart during the "Lyssnarnas val" voting.

== Charts ==
=== Ultima Thule version ===
Chart (1994)	Peak
Sweden	4
