= De ensammas promenad =

Song by Arvingarna

from the album "Nya spår"
- Language: Swedish
- Released: 1997
- Genre: modern dansband music
- Label: Big Bag
- Songwriters: Christer Lundh, Mikael Wendt

De ensammas promenad is a song written by Christer Lundh and Mikael Wendt, and originally recorded by Arvingarna on the group's album Nya spår, released in 1997.

The song was tested for Svensktoppen, where it stayed for 30 weeks between the period 3 January-27 June 1998., topping the chart during the first 19 weeks.

Zekes covered the song on the 2010 album En så'n natt, then titled Ensammas promenad.

Jørgen de Mylius wrote lyrics in Danish as "Min sang til dem der går alene hjem", and with that title the song was recorded by Danish dansband Kandis on the 1998 album "Kandis 7".
