= Etymon (song) =

Single by Sonja Aldén
- A-side: "Etymon"
- B-side: "Etymon" (singback-version)
- Released: March 2006
- Genre: pop
- Label: M&L Records
- Songwriters: Bobby Ljunggren, Ingela Forsman and Henrik Wikström

Sonja Aldén singles chronology
"Etymon" (2006)	"För att du finns" (2007)

Etymon is a song written by Bobby Ljunggren, Ingela Forsman and Henrik Wikström, and performed by Sonja Aldén, using the stage name "Sonya", during the Swedish Melodifestivalen 2006. The song ended up 5th during the competition in Karlstad on 25 February 2006, and was also released as a single the same year. However, the song failed to enter Svensktoppen. At the Swedish singles chart, the song peaked at number 35. Spanish artist Rosa recorded the song as Etymon es el rey with lyrics fully in Spanish for her 2006 album Me siento viva.

== Charts ==
Chart performance for "Etymon"
Chart (2006)	Peak position
Sweden (Sverigetopplistan)	35
