= Curt Haagers -88 =

Studio album by Curt Haagers
- Released: 1986
- Studio: KMH Studios
- Genre: dansband music
- Label: Mariann Records
- Producer: Rutger Gunnarsson (tracks 3 and 9), Lars O. Carlsson (all others)

Curt Haagers chronology
| Curt Haagers -87 (1986) | Curt Haagers -88 (1986) | Riktiga vänner (1989) |

Curt Haagers -88 is a 1988 Curt Haagers studio album. It peaked at No. 38 in the Swedish albums chart.

== Track listing ==
1. Den blinda flickan - (trad. arr: Lars O.Carlsson lyrics: Laila Westersund)
2. Drömmer om dej (Wom Winde Werweht) - (J.Frankfurter-K.Almgren)
3. Mary Bell - (Melodifestivalen 1988 song) (P.Sahlin-S.Wigfors)
4. När du går över floden (P.Karlsson)
5. Volare (instrumental) - (D.Modugno)
6. Mona Mona - (Candy de Rouge-P.Hermansson
7. Låt oss börja om på nytt - (J.Vison)
8. Nu har det hänt igen - (H.Rytterström)
9. Mio min Mio - (Benny Andersson-Björn Ulvaeus)
10. Min Angelique - (B.Månsson)
11. Marina - (Rocco Granata-Owe Meier-Leggard)
12. Gör det igen - (M.Rådberg-I.Forsman)
13. Alla människor på vår jord - (Seller-Marcus-Benjemen-P.Hermansson)
14. En kväll i Spanien - (The Spanish Night is over) (D.Grabowski-Simons-Niehaus-Spiro-C.Lundh

== Charts ==
| Chart (1988) | Peak position |
|---|---|
| Sweden | 38 |
