= 2:nd Chance =

Single by Marie Fredriksson

from the album The Change
- B-side: "All You've Gotta Do Is Feel"
- Released: 15 October 2004
- Studio: Studio Vinden, Djursholm; Cosmos and Polar Studios, Stockholm
- Genre: Alternative rock
- Length: 3:24
- Label: Mary Jane/Amelia Music; Capitol
- Songwriter(s): Marie Fredriksson
- Producer(s): Mikael Bolyos

Marie Fredriksson singles chronology
"Det som var nu" (2000)	"2:nd Chance" (2004)	"All About You" (2004)

"2:nd Chance" is an alternative rock song written by Swedish singer-songwriter Marie Fredriksson, released on 15 October 2004 by Capitol Records in conjunction with Fredriksson's own independent record label Mary Jane/Amelia Music, as the lead single from her sixth studio album, The Change (2004). The song received generally favourable reviews upon release, with several publications comparing it to the work of The Beatles. It was also a commercial success, peaking at number eight on both the Swedish Singles Chart and the Swedish Airplay Chart, and within the top ten of two German airplay-based charts.

== Composition and style ==
"2:nd Chance" was written solely by Marie Fredriksson, who composed its lyrics in approximately ten minutes. The track was produced by her husband Mikael Bolyos, and has a length of three minutes and twenty-four seconds. It was composed in the 4/4 time signature with an andante tempo of 79 beats per minute. The introduction is composed of F–B♭–Dm–G–B♭–C, with each verse consisting of a sequence of F–B♭–F–Dm–G–B♭–C, followed by a chorus of Em–A–Em–A–Em–A–C–D. The second chorus is followed by an instrumental bridge, composed of the same sequence featured in the verses, while the outro is made up of an extended sequence of F–B♭–F–Dm–G–Dm–G–Dm–G–Dm–B♭–C. The track features backing vocals from Max Martin – best known as the writer and producer of Britney Spears' "...Baby One More Time" – who is credited in liner notes of the parent album under his birth name, Martin Sandberg. The lyric "And I look down on my Sydney ring", is a reference to the engagement ring given to Fredriksson by Bolyos, who proposed 48 hours after the two met in Australia, while she was touring that country during Roxette's 1991 "Join the Joyride! Tour".

== Critical reception ==
A writer for Helsingborgs Dagblad described the song as being "so vulnerable it hurts. That it is about a person who has struggled back from the crisis of their lifetime is evident in every tone. The sound might be a bit crunchy, as though it were an old and lovingly restored Beatles ballad, [but it is] beautiful bitwise, and especially brave." Göteborgs-Posten described the song as "delicate and exquisite". Although Expressen gave The Change a negative review, their writer described "2:nd Chance" as one of its highlights; they said that, in comparison to the rest of the album, the track was "comparatively simple and effective radio-pop with a genuinely emotive lyric". Svenska Dagbladet praised the lyrics of the song, saying that "When Marie Fredriksson sings 'Thank God I'm alive', you are actually a bit moved. Knowing that she has fought against a brain tumour and has now come out the other side, [the lyric] becomes substantially more serious than your usual pop fare." They went on to praise the instrumentation, and also compared it to the work of the Beatles, saying: "I tend to be quite allergic to Beatles-scented nostalgia, but here it works perfectly. Staffan Astner's twinkling, beautiful flashes of slide guitar echo George Harrison at his best, and Magnus Lindgren's stylish string arrangement embellishes [the entire song] in an outfit that does not steal attention away from the melody itself."

Several publications also commented on the single's b-side, album track "All You've Gotta Do Is Feel". Helsingborgs Dagblad described it as a "raw studio jam with a ragged chorus and Mats ("Malla") Ronander on harmonica, and a cheeky lick." Svenska Dagbladet said that "All You've Gotta Do Is Feel" was more "energetic and riff-based [than "2:nd Chance"], and echoes both Jimi Hendrix and Atomic Swing. It's a typical b-side from an era when you could turn vinyl singles around and play the reverse".

== Commercial performance ==
"2:nd Chance" was a commercial success when it was released on 8 October 2004; it debuted at number eight on the Swedish Singles Chart on 15 October, becoming her first top ten hit on that chart since "Tro" peaked at the same position in 1996. The track went on to spend thirteen weeks on the chart, making it the second-longest-charting single of her entire solo career. The song peaked at number eight for two weeks on Svensktoppen, Sweden's airplay-based chart, and also entered the top ten of two German airplay-based charts.

== Track listing ==
"2:nd Chance" written by Marie Fredriksson; "All You've Gotta Do Is Feel" written by Mikael Bolyos.

- CD single (Capitol Records: 7243 8 67700–2 8)
1. "2:nd Chance" – 3:24
2. "All You've Gotta Do Is Feel" – 4:04

== Credits and personnel ==
Credits adapted from the liner notes of the single.

Musicians

- Marie Fredriksson – lead and background vocals, cover artwork and inlay illustration
- Mikael Bolyos – Wurlitzer electric piano, organ and string arrangement (track 1); keyboards, maracas and engineering (track 2)
- Staffan Astner – electric guitar (tracks 1 and 2); bass guitar (track 2)
- Peter Forss – bass guitar (track 1)
- Nicci Notini – drums (tracks 1 and 2)
- Mats Ronander – harmonica (track 2)
- Martin Sandberg – background vocals (track 1)
- Stockholm Session Strings – orchestration (track 1)

Technical personnel

- Kjell Andersson – sleeve design
- Magnus Lindgren – string arrangement (track 1)
- Lennart Östlund – engineering and mixing (tracks 1 and 2)
- Pär Wickholm – sleeve design

== Charts ==
Chart (2004)	Peak position
Sweden (Sverigetopplistan)	8
