= Rent förbannat =

Studio album by Ulf Lundell
- Released: 3 October 2012
- Recorded: Riksmixningsverket, Skeppsholmen, Stockholm, Sweden, May- June 2012 and Rockhead Studios, 2012
- Genre: rock
- Length: 1 hour, 51 minutes
- Label: EMI Music Sweden
- Producer: Per Lindholm, Ronny Lahti

Ulf Lundell chronology
Omaha (2008)	Rent förbannat (2012)	Trunk (2013)

Rent förbannat is a 2012 double studio album by Ulf Lundell. Shortly after the album release, Lundell performed the song "Är vi lyckliga nu?" at Skavlan. The album peaked at number one in Sweden and number 13 in Norway.

== Track listing ==
=== CD 1 ===
1. Redan där
2. Är vi lyckliga nu?
3. Jag kan inte andas här längre
4. Dom fyras gäng
5. Nattvakten stjäl
6. Moln utan minnen
7. Arbete och bostad
8. Eld i berget
9. Mitt ansikte
10. Hur lång är en tyst minut?
11. Skiten vinner
12. 79%

=== CD 2 ===
1. Gordon Gekko
2. FBL II
3. Rent förbannat
4. Snart kommer pöbeln
5. Jesus var en röst i natten
6. Sjörövar-Jennys sång
7. Mellan havet och rymden
8. Fula pojkar
9. Schabbelbabbel
10. Kom fram ur skuggorna
11. Vi blir äldre
12. Exil

== Contributors ==
- Ulf Lundell - singer, guitar, composer, lyrics, producer
- Surjo Benigh - bass
- Andreas Dahlbäck - drums, percussion
- Marcus Olsson - piano, electric piano
- Jens Frithiof - guitar
- Jan Bark - guitar
- Stefan Sundström - engineer

== Charts ==
Chart (2012–2013)	Peak position
Norwegian Albums (VG-lista)	13
Swedish Albums (Sverigetopplistan)	1
