= I gränslandet =

Studio album by Sonja Aldén
- Released: 7 March 2012
- Recorded: 2010–2012
- Genre: Pop, schlager
- Label: Lionheart

Sonja Aldén chronology
Under mitt tak (2008)	I gränslandet (2012)	I andlighetens rum (2013)

I gränslandet is a 2012 Sonja Aldén studio album.

== Track listing ==
1. Innan jag släcker lampan
2. Lilla evighet
3. Närmre
4. I din himmel
5. Ljusa ögonblick
6. En stund om dagen
7. I kärlekens land
8. Våga
9. Ödet i din hand
10. Ditt sista ord
11. Kärlekens lov
12. Ett strävsamt gammalt par

== Contributors ==
- Sonja Aldén - vocals
- Henrik Wikström - musician
- Amir Aly - musician
- Peter Boström - musician

== Charts ==
Chart (2012)	Peak position
Swedish Albums (Sverigetopplistan)	12
