= Curt Haagers -87 =

Studio album by Curt Haagers
- Released: 1986
- Recorded: Studio Bohus, Kungälv, Sweden and KMH-studion, Stockholm, Sweden, late 1986
- Genre: dansband music
- Label: Mariann Records
- Producer: Lars O. Karlsson

Curt Haagers chronology
Ännu doftar kärlek (1985)	Curt Haagers -87 (1986)	Curt Haagers -88 (1988)

Curt Haagers -87 is a 1986 Curt Haagers studio album. The backside of the album cover contained the band's planned 1987 performance dates.

== Track listing ==
=== Side A ===
1. Häng med mej på party (My Tool Tool) - 2.17
2. En silverslant för dina tankar (Say You'll Stay Until Tomorrow) - 3.05
3. Ta mej till havet - 3.25
4. Köp en ros - 3.15
5. Roses of Pic Kardy - 2.35 (instrumental)
6. Vilken härlig morgon (Hallo, Guten Morgen) - 3.25
7. Jag vill vakna upp med dej (I Want to Wake Up with You)

=== Side B ===
1. Macken - 2.30
2. Vägen till en vän (That's What Friends are for) - 3.15
3. Venedigs ros - 3.05
4. Amapola - 4.09 (instrumental)
5. Tur i kärlek (Good Luck Charm) - 2.35
6. Sommarminnen - 3.40
7. Där björkarna susa - 2.43

== Contributors ==
- Producer: Lars O. Karlsson
- Sveriges Radios Symfoniorkester
- Choir: Liza Öhman, Lotta Engberg, Lars Westman
- Recorded and mixed: Studio Bohus, Kungälv, Sweden and KMH-studion, Stockholm, Sweden, late 1986
- cover design: Fri Reklam
- Production: Mariann Records, 1986
