= Under mitt tak =

Studio album by Sonja Aldén
- Released: 8 October 2008
- Genre: Pop, schlager
- Length: 43 minutes
- Label: Lionheart
- Producer: Jörgen Ingeström, Bo Reime

Sonja Aldén chronology
Till dig (2007)	Under mitt tak (2008)	I gränslandet (2012)

Under mitt tak is the second studio album by Swedish singer-songwriter Sonja Aldén, released in 2008.

== Track listing ==
1. Under mitt tak (lyrics: Sonja Aldén, music: Sonja Aldén, Bobby Ljunggren and Henrik Wikström)
2. Jag vet att du kan höra mig (lyrics: Sonja Aldén, music: Marcos Ubeda and Bobby Ljunggren)
3. En del är vackra när de dör (lyrics: Sonja Aldén, music: Sonja Aldén, Bobby Ljunggren and Henrik Wikström)
4. Allt jag ser (lyrics: Sonja Aldén, music: Sonja Aldén, Bobby Ljunggren and Henrik Wikström)
5. Nån som du (lyrics: Sonja Aldén, music: Sonja Aldén, Bobby Ljunggren and Henrik Wikström)
6. Du är en del av mig (lyrics: Uno Svenningsson, music: Uno Svenningsson and Bobby Ljunggren)
7. Starkare än då (lyrics: Sonja Aldén, music: Amir Aly, Maciel Numhauser, and Robin Abrahamsson)
8. Din klocka tickar (lyrics: Sonja Aldén, music: Sonja Aldén, Bobby Ljunggren and Henrik Wikström)
9. Det blå (lyrics: Sonja Aldén, music: Sonja Aldén and Hugo Björk)
10. Lyckan kommer, lyckan går (lyrics : Sonja Aldén, music: Sonja Aldén, Bobby Ljunggren and Henrik Wikström)
11. Du får inte (lyrics and music: Sonja Aldén)
12. Välkommen hem (lyrics and music: Sonja Aldén)

== Contributors ==
- Sonja Aldén - vocals
- Jörgen Ingeström - guitar, drums, keyboard, producer
- Robert Ivansson - bass
- Bo Reime - percussion, producer

== Charts ==
=== Weekly charts ===
Chart (2008–2009)	Peak position
Swedish Albums (Sverigetopplistan)	3

=== Year-end charts ===
Chart (2008)	Position
Swedish Albums (Sverigetopplistan)	58
