= Vi lyfter igen =

Studio album by Zekes
- Released: 2011
- Genre: Dansband music
- Label: Lionheart International

Zekes chronology
En så'n natt (2010)	Vi lyfter igen (2011)

Vi lyfter igen is a 2011 Zekes studio album.

== Track listing ==
1. Vi lyfter igen
2. En mycket bättre värld
3. Ett steg i taget
4. Samma sak
5. Hold Me
6. Bullfest
7. Ingen annan du
8. Louise
9. Kalla kårar
10. Någon att hålla i hand
11. Se på mig
12. Om ditt hjärta sa boom

== Charts ==
Chart (2011)	Peak position
Sweden	10
