= Med hjärtat fyllt av ljus =

Single by Shirley Clamp

from the album För den som älskar - en samling
- A-side: "Med hjärtat fyllt av ljus"
- B-side: "Med hjärtat fyllt av ljus" (Oscar Holter remix)
- Released: 2009
- Genre: schlager
- Label: M&L Records
- Songwriters: Bobby Ljunggren, Henrik Wikström, Ingela "Pling" Forsman

Shirley Clamp singles chronology
"Tålamod" (2007)	"Med hjärtat fyllt av ljus" (2009)

"Med hjärtat fyllt av ljus" is a song written by Bobby Ljunggren, Henrik Wikström and Ingela "Pling" Forsman, and performed by Shirley Clamp at Melodifestivalen 2009, where the song participated in the first semifinal inside Scandinavium in Gothenburg on 7 February 2009, getting knocked out of contest. The song was also released as a single.

On 6 March 2009, the single topped the Swedish singles chart. The song also charted at Svensktoppen for two weeks between 1-8 March 2009 with positions 8–9 before leaving chart.

A Melodifestivalen 2009 pause act featured Shirley Clamp acting as a cashier woman, singing the song with the lyrics Med kassen fylld av mat (With the bag full of food).

== Charts ==
Chart (2009)	Peak position
Sweden (Sverigetopplistan)	1
