= Nån som du =

Single by Sonja Aldén

from the album Under mitt tak
- A-side: "Nån som du"
- Released: early summer 2008
- Genre: Schlager
- Label: Lionheart
- Songwriters: Sonja Aldén, Bobby Ljunggren, Henrik Wikström

Sonja Aldén singles chronology
"Det är inte regn som faller" (2007)	"Nån som du" (2008)	"Välkommen hem" (2008)

Nån som du is a song written by Sonja Aldén, Bobby Ljunggren and Henrik Wikström, and recorded by Sonja Aldén on her 2008 album Under mitt tak. In early summer 2008, it was released as a single.

== Chart performance ==
Chart (2008)	Peak position
Sweden	29
