= Längre inåt landet =

Studio album by Ulf Lundell
- Released: September 12, 1980
- Genre: Rock
- Length: 86:46
- Label: Parlophone
- Producer: Kjell Andersson, Lasse Lindbom, Ulf Lundell

Ulf Lundell chronology
Ripp rapp (1979)	Längre inåt landet (1980)	Kär och galen (1982)

Längre inåt landet is the fifth studio album by Swedish rock artist Ulf Lundell and was released on September 12, 1980, through Parlophone. It was produced by Lasse Lindbom, Ulf Lundell and Kjell Andersson. The album was Lundell's first double album.

It was recorded at Ridge Farm in Surrey in southern England, and contains songs like "Stackars Jack" ("Poor Jack") and "Glad igen" ("Happy Again") who kept up with the live repertoire throughout the years. The latter is an interpretation of the Joni Mitchell song "Carey". On the LP release, track number 8 on the second disc is hidden. It is a recording of "Som en syster" ("Like a Sister") from the live album "Natten hade varit mild och öm" from 1977.

The album was reissued in 1999 in a remastered version with three extra tracks, one of which is an interpretation of Bob Dylan's song "Just like a woman."

== Track listing ==
No.	Title	Length
1.	"Glad igen"	3:38
2.	"Främlingar"	3:39
3.	"Odysseus"	5:48
4.	"Ingens kvinna"	5:38
5.	"Pulver"	4:01
6.	"Så mycket äldre"	6:44
7.	"Bara en fråga om när"	3:46
8.	"Hem till mina rötter igen"	4:52
9.	"Bättre tider"	3:20
10.	"Ryggen fri"	6:10
11.	"Under askan"	6:49
12.	"Längre inåt landet"	8:07
13.	"Posörerna"	3:57
14.	"Stackars Jack"	4:31
15.	"Distraherad"	9:51
16.	"Som en syster"	6:02

== Personnel ==
- Ulf Lundell - guitar, piano, harmonica
- Janne Andersson - guitar
- Ingemar Dunker - drums
- Lasse Lindbom - bass, choir
- Mats Ronander - guitar, munspel, choir
- Niklas Strömstedt - piano, Vox-orgel, choir
- Speedy Keen - guitar solo
- Hasse Olsson - Hammond-orgel

== Charts ==
Chart (1980)	Peak position
Sweden (Sverigetopplistan)	2
