= En spännande dag för Josefine =

Song
- Language: Swedish
- Songwriter(s): Benny Borg

En spännande dag för Josefine is a song written by Benny Borg, and recorded by Schytts, using it as a B-side for their 1974 single "Hasta la vista " and also charted at Svensktoppen for one week, at 9th position, on 20 October 1974. It was also recorded by Curt Haagers on their 1985 album with the same name, and Göran Lindbergs orkester, on the 1993 album Den röda stugan.

A 1973 recording by Inger Lise Rypdal, with lyrics in Norwegian by Arne Riis as "En spennende dag for Josefine", topped the Norwegian singles chart in 1974.

Lyrical, the song deals with a girl being teased at school for coming from another country.

== Charts ==
Chart (1974)	Peak position
Norway (VG-lista)	1
