= Ta mig till havet =

Single by Peter Lundblad
- A-side: "Peter Lundblad"
- B-side: "Min enda sång"
- Released: 1986
- Genre: pop
- Label: Sonet
- Songwriter: Peter Lundblad
- Producer: Anders Berglund

"Ta mig till havet" is a summertime-based song written and recorded by Peter Lundblad. It became a hit single for Lundblad in 1986. The song was used as the opening theme for the 1988 edition of Swedish summer vacation TV program Sommarlov.

== Other recordings ==
Recording the song, Curt Haagers charted with it at Svensktoppen for four weeks during the period of 16 November-7 December 1986, peaking at 6th position. Curt Haagers recording also became available on the 1986 album Curt Haagers -87.
