= Den långsamma blomman =

Studio album by Shirley Clamp
- Released: 26 May 2004 (Sweden)
- Recorded: 2003–2004
- Genre: pop
- Label: Lionheart

Shirley Clamp chronology
Den långsamma blomman (2004)	Lever mina drömmar (2005)

Den långsamma blomman is the debut studio album from Swedish pop singer Shirley Clamp, released on 26 May 2004. It peaked at number three on the Swedish Albums Chart.

== Track listing ==
1. "För den som älskar"
2. "Min kärlek"
3. "Eviga längtan"
4. "Ingenting finns kvar"
5. "Den långsamma blomman"
6. "Det är så enkelt"
7. "Dårarnas natt"
8. "Ber en liten bön"
9. "Jag fick låna en ängel"
10. "Äntligen (Mr. Memory)"
11. "Vågar inte än"
12. "Det är du"
13. "Champions" (Sweden women's national football team official song 2004)
14. "Du är allt"

== Charts ==
=== Weekly charts ===
Chart (2004–2005)	Peak position
Swedish Albums (Sverigetopplistan)	3

=== Year-end charts ===
Chart (2004)	Position
Swedish Albums (Sverigetopplistan)	45
