= Min kärlek =

Single by Shirley Clamp

from the album Den långsamma blomman
- Released: March 15, 2004
- Recorded: 2004
- Genre: Schlager, dance
- Length: 3:01
- Label: M&L RECORDS
- Songwriters: Bobby Ljunggren, Henrik Wikström and Ingela Forsman

Shirley Clamp singles chronology
"Jag fick låna en ängel" (2003)	"Min kärlek" (2004)	"Eviga längtan" (2004)

"Min kärlek" (Swedish: My Love) is the greatest hit and fourth official single from the Swedish pop singer Shirley Clamp. The song, composed by Ingela "Pling" Forsman, Bobby Ljunggren and Henrik Wikström, was one of the entries at the Swedish selection for the Eurovision Song Contest 2004, Melodifestivalen 2004, where it came second in the final. The entry in fact failed to make the Melodifestivalen final initially, but was voted through in the 'Second Chance' round. The song won the National Finals Song Contest.

== Melodifestivalen trajectory ==
- Fourth Semi-final (Malmö). First Round: 40,066 televotes (4º/8). Second Round: 42,580 televotes (4º/5).
- Andra Chansen. 57,343 televotes (2º/8).
- Final (Stockholm). Juries: 82 points. Televote: 88 points (176,343 televotes (3º=88 points)). Total: 174 points (2º/10)

== The single ==
The single, produced by M&L RECORDS was released in Sweden on March 15, 2004, five days before the final. It was Gold Disc. The single peaked at number three on the Swedish singles chart.

=== Track listing ===
1. Min kärlek
2. Min kärlek (lång radioremix)
3. Min kärlek (längre klubbremix)
4. Min kärlek (längre instrumental

== List placings ==
=== Svensktoppen ===
On the Swedish hitlist Svensktoppen "Min kärlek" was the best placed 2004 Melodifestivalen song at Svensktoppen, before the 5th placed "Det gör ont" and the 12th placed "La dolce vita".

=== Tracks ===
In 2004, "Min kärlek" was also on the Swedish hitlist "Tracks".

== Chart positions ==
=== Weekly charts ===
Chart (2004)	Peak position
Sweden (Sverigetopplistan)	3

=== Year-end charts ===
Chart (2004)	Position
Sweden (Sverigetopplistan)	11
