= Nådens år =

Studio album by Ulf Lundell
- Released: April 18, 1978
- Genre: Rock
- Length: 45:16
- Label: EMI, Parlophone
- Producer: Kjell Andersson & Ulf Lundell

Ulf Lundell chronology
Törst (1976)	Nådens år (1978)	Ripp rapp (1979)

Nådens år (The Year of Grace) is the third studio album by the Swedish rock artist Ulf Lundell. It was released in April 1978 on EMI and Parlophone. It was recorded in EMI Studio, Stockholm, and produced by Kjell Andersson and Lundell. It includes "Snön faller och vi med den" ("The snow is falling and we are too"), one of Lundell's more famous songs. Agnetha Fältskog is involved in the song. The cover picture shows Lundell sitting on a rock next to a dog and it was taken in Åre in 1977. Nådens år achieved Gold status in Sweden.

== Conflict with Viveka Heyman and Dådens år ==
The album faced a legal challenge because Lundell had not received the rights to Viveka Heyman's Swedish translation of "Den lille landstrykaren" (original text by William Blake). So Nådens år was withdrawn and a revised version called Dådens år replaced it. The cover is the same, though Lundell scribbled over the title (changing "Nådens" to "Dådens") and over his own face. "Den lille landstrykaren" was replaced with "Ack Blake, käre Blace" employing the same melody, but the text describes how Heyman refused to allow Lundell to use her text. The deliberate misspelling of 'Blake' in the song title alludes to the misspelling of Heyman's first name (i.e. Viveca instead of Viveka). Heyman herself described the song as "noise terror".

== Track listing ==
All songs by Ulf Lundell, except where noted:

Side one

1. "Nådens år" - 2:47
2. "Snön faller och vi med den" - 4:33
3. "Höga hästar" - 5:08
4. "Natten har sitt sätt" - 2:53
5. "Den lille landstrykaren" (Music: Lundell, Swedish text: Viveka Heyman, Original text: William Blake) - 3:02
6. "Kärlekens hundar" - 2:47

Side two

1. "Warum All This Black Stuff?" - 4:38
2. "Prärien igen" - 6:51
3. "Sonjas vals" - 3:10
4. "Kitsch" - 5:12
5. "Vit flagg" - 5:24

== Personnel ==
- Ulf Lundell - vocals, piano, bells, electric guitar, acoustic guitar, tambourine
- Rolf Alex - drums, tambourine
- Mike Watson - bass
- Totte Bergström - acoustic guitar
- Hasse Breitholtz - Piano, synth, orgel, trumpet
- Carol Mognaski - mandolin
- Agnetha Fältskog - Sång, kör
- Lasse Hoflund - bass
- Slim Notini - piano
- Janne Andersson - electric guitar
- Lasse Wellander - electric guitar, acoustic guitar
- Mats Ronander - electric guitar, backup vocals, percussion
- Rutger Gunnarsson - bass
- Rolf Färdigh - acoustic guitar, electric guitar
- Basse Wickman - acoustic guitar
- Kjell Öhman - accordion, Polymoog synthesizer
- Janne King - recorder
- John Holm - vocals, backup vocals

== Charts ==
Chart (1978)	Peak position
Sweden (Sverigetopplistan)	4
