= Törst (album) =

Studio album by Ulf Lundell
- Released: June 9, 1976
- Genre: Rock
- Length: 41:30
- Label: Harvest, EMI Svenska
- Producer: Björn Boström

Ulf Lundell chronology
Vargmåne (1975)	Törst (1976)	Nådens år (1978)

Törst is the second studio album by Swedish rock artist Ulf Lundell. It was released in June 1976 on Harvest and EMI Svenska. It was recorded in EMI Studio, Stockholm and produced by Björn Boström.

== Track listing ==
All songs by Ulf Lundell, except where noted:

Side one

1. "Törst" - 6:33
2. "Jag vill ha ett lejon" - 4:26
3. "Mitt i nattens djungel ställd" - 5:07
4. "Birgitta hon dansar" - 5:26

Side two

1. "USA" - 4:06
2. "Och går en stund på jorden" - 3:28
3. "Cobra Rax" - 3:52
4. "Våren närmar sej city" - 4:26
5. "Söndag" - 4:06

== Personnel ==
- Ulf Lundell - vocals
- Finn Sjöberg - guitar
- Per-Erik Hallin - piano, orgel, clavinett, dragspelet Victoria Super
- Mike Watson - bass, washboard
- Erik Romantschicz - drums
- Mats Glenngård - violin
- Ulf Andersson - saxophone

== Charts ==
Chart (1976)	Peak position
Sweden (Sverigetopplistan)	12
