= Meningen med livet =

Studio album by Sonja Aldén
- Released: 24 March 2017
- Recorded: 2016–2017
- Studio: K51
- Length: 49 minutes
- Label: Capitol
- Producer: Anders Pettersson, David Lindgren Zacharias, Ollie Olson

Sonja Aldén chronology
Jul i andlighetens rum (2014)	Meningen med livet (2017)

Meningen med livet was released on 24 March 2017, and is a studio album by Sonja Aldén.

== Track listing ==
No.	Title	Lyrics	Music	Length
1.	"Meningen med livet"	Anders Pettersson, David Lindgren Zacharias, Ollie Olson, Sonja Aldén	Anders Pettersson, David Lindgren Zacharias, Ollie Olson
2.	"Löftet"	Anders Pettersson, David Lindgren Zacharias, Sonja Aldén	Anders Pettersson
3.	"Facit"	Anders Pettersson, David Lindgren Zacharias, Ollie Olson, Sonja Aldén	Anders Pettersson, David Lindgren Zacharias, Ollie Olson
4.	"Andas utan luft"	Anders Pettersson, David Lindgren Zacharias, Ollie Olson, Sonja Aldén	Anders Pettersson, David Lindgren Zacharias, Ollie Olson
5.	"Söderut"	Anders Pettersson	Anders Pettersson, Sonja Aldén
6.	"Såren utanpå"	Anders Pettersson	Anders Pettersson, Sonja Aldén
7.	"Kasta mig ut"	David Lindgren Zacharias, Ollie Olson, Emanuel Olsson, Sonja Aldén	David Lindgren Zacharias, Ollie Olson, Emanuel Olsson, Sonja Aldén
8.	"Bastuholmen"	Anders Pettersson, David Lindgren Zacharias, Ollie Olson, Sonja Aldén	Anders Pettersson, David Lindgren Zacharias, Ollie Olson, Sonja Aldén
9.	"Aldrig vara där igen"	Sonja Aldén	Christian Waltz, Ollie Olson
10.	"Paus"	Anders Pettersson, David Lindgren Zacharias, Sonja Aldén	Anders Pettersson, David Lindgren Zacharias, Ollie Olson
11.	"Sommarens sista dag"	Anders Pettersson, David Lindgren Zacharias, Ollie Olson, Sonja Aldén	Anders Pettersson, David Lindgren Zacharias, Ollie Olson, Sonja Aldén
12.	"Jag känner dig nu"	Anders Pettersson	Anders Pettersson, Sonja Aldén
13.	"Jubelsången"	Lotta Hasselquist, Isabella Karlsson	Stefan Nilsson

== Charts ==
Chart (2017)	Peak position
Swedish Albums (Sverigetopplistan)	10
