= Schytts =

- Origin: Gothenburg, Sweden
- Genres: Dansband music
- Years active: 1962–
- Labels: Mariann, DoReMe, TMC - The Music Company, Platina, Rival, Odeon, Marilla, Montax Music, IFK Göteborg, Warner Music Sweden

Schytts is a Swedish dansband, established in 1962 as Public Killers before changing their name the upcoming year. The name Schytts was taken from their founding drummer Yngve Schytt. Their major breakthrough came in 1973, with the song "Aj, aj, aj", which appeared on their debut studio album Hålligång 1, released the same year.

== Discography ==
=== Albums ===
- Hålligång 1 - 1973
- Hålligång 2 - 1974
- Hålligång 3 - 1974
- Hålligång 4 - 1975
- Hålligång 5 - 1975
- Hålligång 6 - 1976
- Änglalåtar - 1976
- Hålligång 7 - Disco Lady - 1977
- VM-skivan - 1978
- Hålligång 8 - Rock'n'roll - 1979
- Nya änglalåtar - 1979
- Vi ska ha fest - 1980
- Greatest Hits - 1980
- Bullfest - 1984
- Hålligång 11 - samling vid pumpen - 1985
- Hålligång 12 - Tid för lite äventyr - 1987
- Jubileumsdans samlingsplatta - 1989
- Danshålligång 14 - Mitt hjärtas hamn - 1990
- Hålligång 15 - De' e' la' gôtt - 1991
- Musikparaden - 1992
- Aj, aj, aj - 1993
- 16 - 1995
- Hålligång 20 bästa - 1997
- En ängel i mitt hus - 1998
- Ett fenomen - 1998
- Guldkorn - 2001
- Nya änglahits - 2002 (with Bhonus)

=== Singles ===
- Ingen har älskat så - 1999
- Kom tätt intill, dansa nära - 2000
- Solregn - 2001
- I ett nattåg söderut - 2001
- Det finns tid - 2002
- Ta mig ända hem - 2003
- En dag, en natt med dig - 2005
- Ta med dig allting när du går - 2006
- Linda sa - 2007
- På G igen - 2008

== Svensktoppen songs ==
- Aj, aj, aj (1973)
- En annan stad, en annan vän (1974)
- Tala om vart du ska resa (1974)
- Hasta La Vista (1974)
- Hasta Manana (1974)
- Na Na Na (1974)
- En spännande dag för Josefine (1974)
- Emma (1975)
- Låt oss träffas på stranden (1975)
- Om och om och om och om igen (1975)
- Don Carlo dansar (1976)
- Disco Lady (1977)
- Tingelingeling (1977)
- Ge mig mera (1978)
- Vi gör så gott vi kan (1978)
- Kommer du ihåg Babylon (1978)
- Du är som en sommardag (1979)
- Jamaica farväl (1979)
- Sol, öar, vind och hav (1980)
- Copenhagen (1981)
- Oh la la, fyra dar i Paris (1988)
- Dé é lá gôtt (1993)
- Allt finns kvar hos dig (1996)
- En ängel i mitt hus (1997)
- Natten tänder sina ljus (1998)
- Ingen har älskat så (2000)
- Ett fenomen (2000)
- Kom tätt intill, dansa nära (2001)
- Ett nattåg söderut (2002)
- Det fanns en tid (2002)

== Members ==
=== Current members ===
- Linus Pettersson
- Andreas Eriksson
- Mattias Eriksson
- Tommie Pettersson
- Peter Danielson

=== Former members ===
- Tommy Hansson
- Stefan Nilsson
- Bo Dahllöf
- Bengt Zackaroff
- Kent Ahlm
- Peter Brodin
- Christer Mellåker
- Kjell Björk
- Roger Andersson
- Bo-Erik Linnell
- Sture Lundqvist
- Yngve Schytt
- Bert Lundkvist
- Tony Johansson
- Mikael Wängkvist
- Roland Hedin
- Hans Lundström
- Tomas Edström
- Conny Haglund
- Per Leden
- Johan Silfverhjelm
- Christer Oxenryd
- Peter Danielson
- Yeni Karlsson
- Tony Johansson
