= Favoriter på svenska =

Studio album by Shirley Clamp
- Released: 10 May 2006
- Genre: Pop

Shirley Clamp chronology
Lever mina drömmar (2005)	Favoriter på svenska (2006)	Tålamod (2007)

Favoriter på svenska (Swedish for "Favorites in Swedish") was released on 10 May 2006 and is an album where Swedish pop singer Shirley Clamp sings covers in the Swedish language. The album peaked at number seven on the Swedish Albums Chart.

== Track listing ==
1. När kärleken föds (It Must Have Been Love)
2. Öppna din dörr
3. I en annan del av världen
4. Jag kan nå dig (When I love You)
5. Vindarna som bär (Wind Beneath My Wings)
6. Regn hos mig
7. I dina ögon (True Colors)
8. Tro
9. Hur sköra vi är (Fragile)
10. Om
11. Inget kan gå fel

== Charts ==
=== Weekly charts ===
Chart (2006)	Peak position
Swedish Albums (Sverigetopplistan)	7

=== Year-end charts ===
Chart (2006)	Position
Swedish Albums (Sverigetopplistan)	94
