= Tålamod =

Studio album by Shirley Clamp
- Released: October 24, 2007
- Recorded: 2007
- Genre: Pop

Shirley Clamp chronology
| Favoriter på svenska (2006) | Tålamod (2007) | För den som älskar - en samling (2009) |

Tålamod is a studio album by Swedish pop singer Shirley Clamp released on October 24, 2007.

== Track listing ==
1. Tålamod
2. Ett hus på stranden
3. Jag tar en annan väg
4. Aldrig
5. Kanske är det så
6. Tystnaden den sårar
7. Som man bäddar får man ligga
8. Mot horisonten
9. Efter allt
10. Kan inte sova utan dig
11. Som en saga
12. Två själar
13. Trött på att höra
14. Även om jag snubblar

== Charts ==
| Chart (2007) | Peak position |
|---|---|
| Sweden (Sverigetopplistan) | 20 |
