= Eviga längtan =

2004 single by Shirley Clamp

Single by Shirley Clamp

from the album Den långsamma blomman
- Released: 24 June 2004
- Recorded: 2004
- Genre: Pop
- Length: 3:32
- Label: Lionheart International
- Songwriters: Fredrik Kempe, Lotta Bromé

Shirley Clamp singles chronology
"Min kärlek" (2004)	"Eviga längtan" (2004)	"För den som älskar" (2004)

"Eviga längtan" was released in 2004 and is the fifth single from Swedish pop singer Shirley Clamp. The song is schlager-inspired and very similar to her previous hit single, "Min kärlek".

Produced by Lionheart, the single was released in Sweden on 23 June 2004 and peaked at number 24 on the Swedish Singles Chart. The single, has also two versions of Eviga längtan. The song is included at Shirley Clamp's debut album, "Den långsamma blomman", from 2004.

"Eviga längtan" was also on Svensktoppen for eight weeks from 26 September-14 November 2004 before leaving the chart. It peaked at number three on Svensktoppen.

== Track listing ==
1. Eviga längtan
2. Evig radiomix
3. Evig klubbmix

== Charts ==
Chart (2004)	Peak position
Sweden	24
