= Vi gör så gott vi kan =

Song by Swedish World Cup Squad & Schytts

from the album VM-skivan
- Language: Swedish
- Released: 1978
- Genre: Dansband music
- Label: Mariann Records
- Composer: Gert Lengstrand
- Lyricist: Lasse Holm

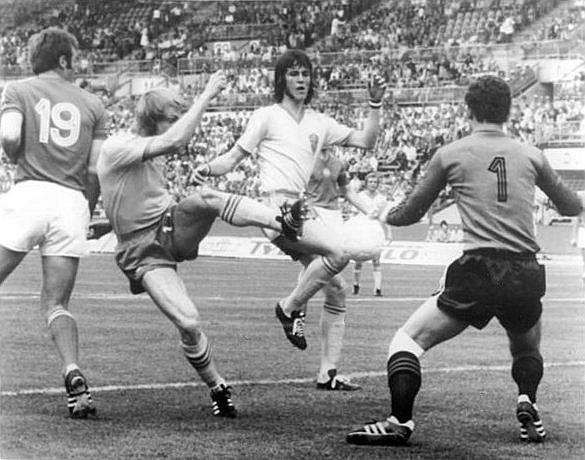
Ralf Edström

Vi gör så gott vi kan is a song written by Lasse Holm and Gert Lengstrand as a fight song for the Sweden men's national football team for the 1978 FIFA World Cup in Argentina.

The song was recorded by the Swedish national team players together with Schytts The recording ends with Ralf Edström adding "En gör så gött en kan" ("You do as good as you can"). On 11 June 1978, the song entered the Svensktoppen chart, reaching seventh position, only to have been knocked out of chart the upcoming week.
