= Aj, aj, aj =

Single by Schytts
- A-side: "Aj, aj, aj"
- B-side: "Tack för alla kyssar"
- Released: 1973
- Genre: dansband music
- Length: 3:57
- Label: Mariann
- Songwriter: Rune Wallebom

"Aj, aj, aj" or "Aj, aj, aj (det bultar och det bankar)" is a song written by Rune Wallebom, and originally recorded by Schytts who scored a Svensktoppen hit between the period of 9 September-9 December 1973. The song topped the chart. It was also recorded by Matz Bladhs and Roosarna.

The song's lyrics describe a love meeting during a party where the I person soon learns the you person is already married and has children, and describes his/her own feelings.

When Schytts recorded the song in 1976 on the album Änglalåtar Gert Lengstrand had written new lyrics, Aj, aj, aj (det rasslar uti nätet), turning it into a soccer song.

At Dansbandskampen 2008 the song was performed by Jonas Näslund and Jive. However, not live over Sveriges Television since the band was already knocked out in the previous moment, "Dansbandsklassikern". However the version became available for the official Dansbandskampen compilation album. One of the participating bands at Dansbandskampen, Bengt Hennings, released a version on the 2009 album Låt kärleken slå till. At Dansbandskampen 2009 the song was performed by Zekes, who also performed the song on the 2010 album En så'n natt. At Dansbandskampen 2010 the song was performed by Patrik's Combo.

The song is one of the titles in the book Tusen svenska klassiker (2009).

In the radio program Framåt fredag, where famous songs receive new lyrics parodying current events, the song was performed as "Oj, oj, oj".
