= Trunk (album) =

Studio album by Ulf Lundell
- Released: November 20, 2013
- Genre: pop, rock
- Length: 1 hour, 1 minute
- Label: Parlophone

Ulf Lundell chronology
Rent förbannat (2012)	Trunk (2013)

Trunk is a 2013 album by Swedish musician Ulf Lundell. It reached number one in the Swedish albums chart.

== Track listing ==
1. Vi är inte arbetslösa
2. När vi var kungar
3. Det går som smort
4. Som en fyr i natten
5. Poker i Karibien
6. L-bows & Kash
7. 63 i november
8. Gå på tvärs
9. Fritt fall
10. Kom hem igen
11. El perro
12. Jag vill ha fest

== Contributing musicians ==
- Ulf Lundell – vocals, guitar, composer, lyricist
- Janne Bark – guitar
- Jens Frithiof – guitar
- Surjo Benigh – bass
- Andreas Dahlbäck – drums, percussion
- Marcus Olsson – synthesizer, keyboard, saxophone, piano, organ

== Charts ==
Chart (2013)	Peak position
Norway (VG-lista)	25
Swedend (Sverigetopplistan)	1
