= Du får inte =

Single by Sonja Aldén

from the album Under mitt tak
- A-side: "Du får inte"
- Released: September 2008
- Genre: schlager
- Label: Lionheart
- Songwriter: Sonja Aldén

Sonja Aldén singles chronology
"Välkommen hem" (2008)	"Du får inte" (2008)	"Innan jag släcker lampan" (2010)

"Du får inte" is a song written by Sonja Aldén, and recorded by herself on her 2008 album Under mitt tak. In September 2008, it was released as a single.

== Charts ==
Chart (2008–2009)	Peak position
Sweden (Sverigetopplistan)	17
