= Jul i andlighetens rum =

Sonja Alden Christmas album

Studio album by Sonja Aldén
- Released: 7 November 2014
- Genre: Christmas
- Label: Lionheart

Sonja Aldén chronology
I andlighetens rum (2013)	Jul i andlighetens rum (2014)	Meningen med livet (2017)

Jul i andlighetens rum was released on 7 November 2014, and is a Sonja Aldén Christmas album.

== Track listing ==
1. Jul, jul, strålande jul
2. Bereden väg för Herran (with Åsa Jinder)
3. Gläns över sjö och strand
4. En stjärna lyser så klar (En stjerne skinner i natt)
5. Snön
6. Viskar en bön
7. Stilla natt (Stille Nacht, helige Nacht)
8. Koppången
9. O helga natt (Cantique de Noël)
10. När det lider mot jul (with Åsa Jinder)
11. Den första julen
12. Ave Maria

== Charts ==
Chart (2014)	Peak position
Sweden	6
