= Peter Lundblad =

Swedish singer and songwriter

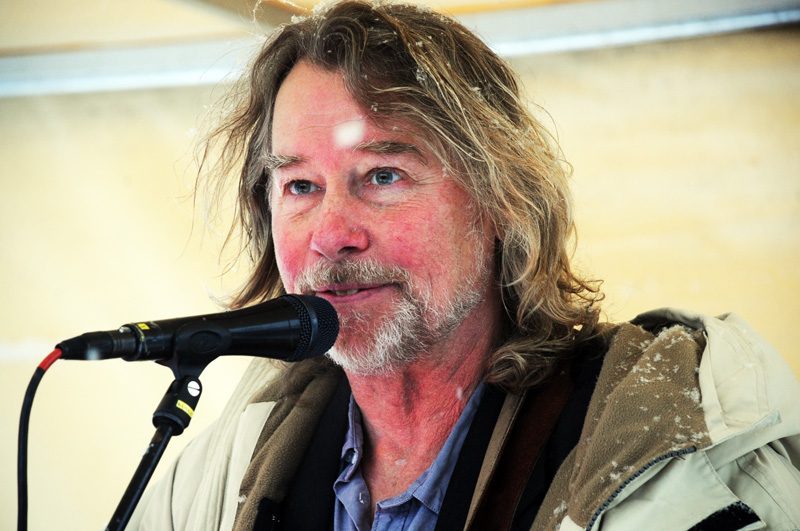
- Peter Lundblad in 2012

Background information
- Born: Gustaf Peter Lundblad; 26 August 1950; Södermanland, Sweden
- Died: 22 December 2015 (aged 65)
- Genres: pop, rock
- Occupations: Singer, songwriter

Gustaf Peter Lundblad (26 August 1950 – 22 December 2015) was a Swedish singer and songwriter, well known for his 1986 song Ta mig till havet. Lundblad started his career in the band 'The most Remarkable Nailband' where Lasse Tennander appeared as songwriter. Later they started the band 'Duga' but Tennander left the band quickly. In 1978, Lundblad and Torbjörn wrote and recorded the song Who Will Comfort Toffle? which also is a children's book written by Tove Jansson. Together with Agneta Olsson, Lundblad competed in Melodifestivalen 1983 with the song Vill du ha mig efter gryningen.

Lundblad died of prostate cancer, on 22 December 2015, aged 65.

== Discography ==
=== Albums ===
Year	Album	Peak positions
Year	Album	SWE
1973	Öga för Öga...	—
1974	Seaweed Gardens	—
1978	Vem ska trösta knyttet?	—
1979	Club Öken	—
1981	Musik i mitt öra	—
1983	Lugn extas	—
1986	Ta mej till havet	—
1988	Härliga liv...	—
1997	Allt betyder allt	—
2003	Språnget	33

=== Singles ===
Year	Single	Peak positions
Year	Single	SWE
1981	"Ge apan i dig en chans"	15
1986	"Ta mej till havet"	91
