= Kär och galen =

Studio album by Ulf Lundell
- Released: October 1, 1982
- Genre: Rock
- Length: 46:17
- Label: EMI
- Producer: Kjell Andersson, Lasse Lindbom, Ulf Lundell

Ulf Lundell chronology
Längre inåt landet (1980)	Kär och galen (1982)	Sweethearts (1984)

Kär och galen is the sixth studio album by Swedish rock artist Ulf Lundell. It was released in October 1982 by EMI. It was produced by Lasse Lindbom, Ulf Lundell and Kjell Andersson.

The album has sold 4× platinum in Sweden and contains Ulf Lundell's most famous song, "Öppna landskap" ("Open landscapes"), which meant his big break to a wider audience. The song was proposed to become Sweden's new national anthem and has been translated into a wide range of languages.

The album was reissued in 1998 in a remastered version with two extra tracks, a demo version of "Öppna landskap" and "Hårt regn".

== Track listing ==
No.	Title	Length
1.	"Kär och galen"	5:26
2.	"Öppna landskap"	4:39
3.	"Herrarna"	2:41
4.	"Aldrig nånsin din clown"	3:21
5.	"I kvinnors ögon"	3:25
6.	"Laglös"	4:40
7.	"I dina slutna rum"	5:57
8.	"Lycklig, lycklig"	4:26
9.	"När jag kysser havet"	5:08
10.	"Vid din grind igen"	6:52

== Personnel ==
- Ulf Lundell - vocals, guitar
- Hasse Olsson - Hammond-orgel
- Janne Bark - guitar
- Pelle Alsing - drums, marimba
- Martin Cerha - bass
- Olle Nyberg - piano, marimba
- Lasse Lindbom - vocals, guitar

== Charts ==
Chart (1982)	Peak position
Sweden (Sverigetopplistan)	1
