= Vargmåne =

1975 studio album by Ulf Lundell

Studio album by Ulf Lundell
- Released: 3 September 1975
- Genres: Rock; pop
- Label: Harvest
- Producer: Björn Boström

Ulf Lundell chronology
Vargmåne (1975)	Törst (1976)

Vargmåne is the debut studio album by Swedish rock artist Ulf Lundell. It was released in September 1975 on Harvest. It was recorded in EMI Studio, Stockholm and produced by Björn Boström. Vargmåne was released in 1992 on CD and released again in 2000 in a remastered edition with two bonus tracks that Lundell recorded with a 4-track Tandberg Sound On Sound. The only music Lundell didn't write himself on the record is "Jag går på promenaden" which is the John Mayall song "Walking on Sunset". Vargmåne sold gold in Sweden.

== Track listing ==
All songs by Ulf Lundell, except where noted:

Side one

1. Stockholms City - 4:01
2. Då kommer jag och värmer dej - 3:04
3. Sniglar och krut - 3:35
4. Sextisju, sextisju - 5:09
5. När duellen är över - 3:06

Side two

1. Jag går på promenaden (Mayall - sv. text: Lundell) - 3:18
2. Bente - 5:16
3. Jesse James möter kärleken - 5:55
4. Nu har jag förpackat min längtan - 3:05

== Personnel ==
- Ulf Lundell – vocals
- Wojciech Ernest – piano
- Finn Sjöberg – guitar
- Jan Bergman – bass guitar
- Mike Watson – bass guitar
- Ola Brunkert – drums
- Roger Palm – drums
- Mats Ronander – harmonica
- Ulf Andersson – tenor saxophone, flute

Production

- Björn Boström – producer
- Björn Norén – engineer
- Lars Rosin – engineer

Artwork

- Joakim Strömholm – photography

== Charts ==
Chart (1975–76)	Peak position
Swedish Albums (Sverigetopplistan)	38
