= Den vassa eggen =

Studio album by Ulf Lundell
- Released: October 21, 1985
- Genre: Rock
- Length: 88:44
- Label: Pandion
- Producer: Kjell Andersson, Lasse Lindbom, Ulf Lundell

Ulf Lundell chronology
12 sånger (1984)	Den vassa eggen (1985)	Det goda livet (1987)

Den vassa eggen is the ninth studio album by Swedish rock artist Ulf Lundell and was released on October 21, 1985, through Pandion. It was produced by Lasse Lindbom, Lundell and Kjell Andersson. The album has sold platinum in Sweden.

== Track listing ==
1. Släpp mej fri
2. Chans
3. Den vassa eggen
4. Kyssar och smek
5. Nytt liv
6. Äktenskap
7. Inte ett ont ord
8. En fri man i stan
9. Lit de parade
10. En ängel på isen
11. Aldrig så ensam
12. Tuff match (alternativ version)
13. Främmande stad
14. Vi kunde ha älskat
15. Rialto

== Personnel ==
- Ulf Lundell - vocals, guitar, harmonica
- Janne Bark - guitar, banjo
- Backa Hans Eriksson - bass, OSCar, timpani, marimba, String arrangements
- Hasse Olsson - Yamaha DX7, Juno 60, Roland JX-3P, Hammond-orgel, marimba
- Pelle Sirén - guitar
- Niklas Strömstedt - piano, Yamaha DX7, Korg DW-6000, Roland JX-3P, Juno 106
- Tim Werner - drums, percussion
- Pelle Andersson - percussion
- Mats Sjöström - bag pipes
- Lasse Lindbom - guitar
- Janne Kling - flute

=== Choir ===
- Janne Bark, Backa Hans Eriksson, Tove Naess, Niklas Strömstedt, Lasse Lindbom, Marianne Flynner, Marie Fredriksson

=== Violin ===
- Anders Dahl, Aleksander Migdal, Lennart Fredriksson, Lars Stegenberg, Gunnar Eklund, Gunnar Michols, Lars Arvinder, Bo Söderström, Bertil Orsin, Olle Markström, Harry Teike

=== Cello ===
- Daniel Holst, Peter Molander, Gunnar Östling, Åke Olofsson, Sebastian Öberg

== Charts ==
Chart (1985)	Peak position
Swedish Albums (Sverigetopplistan)	1
