= Gör mig lycklig nu =

Single by Mats Ronander & Kim Larsen

from the album Himlen gråter för Elmore James
- Released: 1992
- Label: Warner
- Songwriter(s): Mats Ronander, Kim Larsen

"Gör mig lycklig nu" is a 1992 Swedish / Danish song performed by Mats Ronander and Kim Larsen with music by Larsen and lyrics by Larsen and Ronander. The single, from Ronander's album Himlen gråter för Elmore James, peaked at #24 on the Swedish singles chart on 9 December 1992.
