= I andlighetens rum =

Studio album by Sonja Aldén
- Released: 16 October 2013
- Label: Lionheart

Sonja Aldén chronology
I gränslandet (2012)	I andlighetens rum (2013)	Jul i andlighetens rum (2014)

I andlighetens rum is the fourth studio album by Swedish singer-songwriter Sonja Aldén. It was released on 16 October 2013.

== Track listing ==
1. Ljuset
2. I denna stund
3. Kärlekens lov
4. I den stora sorgens famn
5. Omkring tiggar'n från Luossa
6. Om det var Gud
7. I din himmel
8. Jag ger dig min morgon (I Give You the Morning)
9. Bred dina vida vingar
10. Jag ser
11. Den gyllene staden
12. Blott en dag

== Charts ==
=== Weekly charts ===
Chart (2013)	Peak position
Swedish Albums (Sverigetopplistan)	4

=== Year-end charts ===
Chart (2013)	Position
Swedish Albums (Sverigetopplistan)	31
