= Ripp rapp =

1979 studio album by Ulf Lundell

Studio album by Ulf Lundell
- Released: 4 September 1979
- Recorded: June–August 1979
- Studio: EMI (Stockholm)
- Genre: Rock
- Length: 51:23
- Label: Parlophone
- Producer: Ulf Lundell; Kjell Andersson; Lasse Lindbom

Ulf Lundell chronology
| Nådens år (1978) | Ripp rapp (1979) | Längre inåt landet (1980) |

Singles from Ripp rapp
- 1. "(Oh la la) Jag vill ha dej" Released: 1979; 2. "På fri fot" Released: 1979

Ripp rapp is the fourth studio album by Swedish singer-songwriter Ulf Lundell, released on 4 September 1979, by Parlophone.

The album was reissued in 1998 in a remastered version with extra tracks.

== Track listing ==
All tracks are written by Ulf Lundell

Ripp rapp – Side one
| No. | Title | Length |
|---|---|---|
| 1. | "På fri fot" | 4:41 |
| 2. | "Håll mej!...åh, ingenting" | 4:57 |
| 3. | "Rom i regnet" | 4:03 |
| 4. | "Du tog mej" | 4:30 |
| 5. | "Hav utan hamnar" | 6:18 |
| Total length: | | 24:29 |

Ripp rapp – Side two
| No. | Title | Length |
|---|---|---|
| 1. | "(Oh la la) Jag vill ha dej" | 4:34 |
| 2. | "Taxi" | 8:46 |
| 3. | "Den unge barbaren" | 3:48 |
| 4. | "Ute på tippen" | 5:10 |
| 5. | "Stjärnorna" | 4:36 |
| Total length: | | 26:54 |

== Personnel ==
- Ulf Lundell - vocals, guitar, piano, harmonica
- Lasse Lindbom - vocals, guitar, percussion, bass
- Janne Andersson - guitar, vocals
- Ingmar “Sture” Dunker - drums
- Roffe Färdigh - guitar
- Hasse Breitholtz - Steinway, vocals
- Peter Lindroth - electric piano
- Kjell Öhman - orgel, Polymoog, accordion
- Stefan Nilsson - Moog
- Rutger Gunnarsson - bass
- Carlo Moghachi - mandolin
- Eva Dahlgren - vocals
- Totte Bergström - guitar

== Charts ==
Weekly chart performance for Ripp rapp
| Chart (1979–1980) | Peak position |
|---|---|
| Swedish Albums (Sverigetopplistan) | 3 |
