= Mats Ronander =

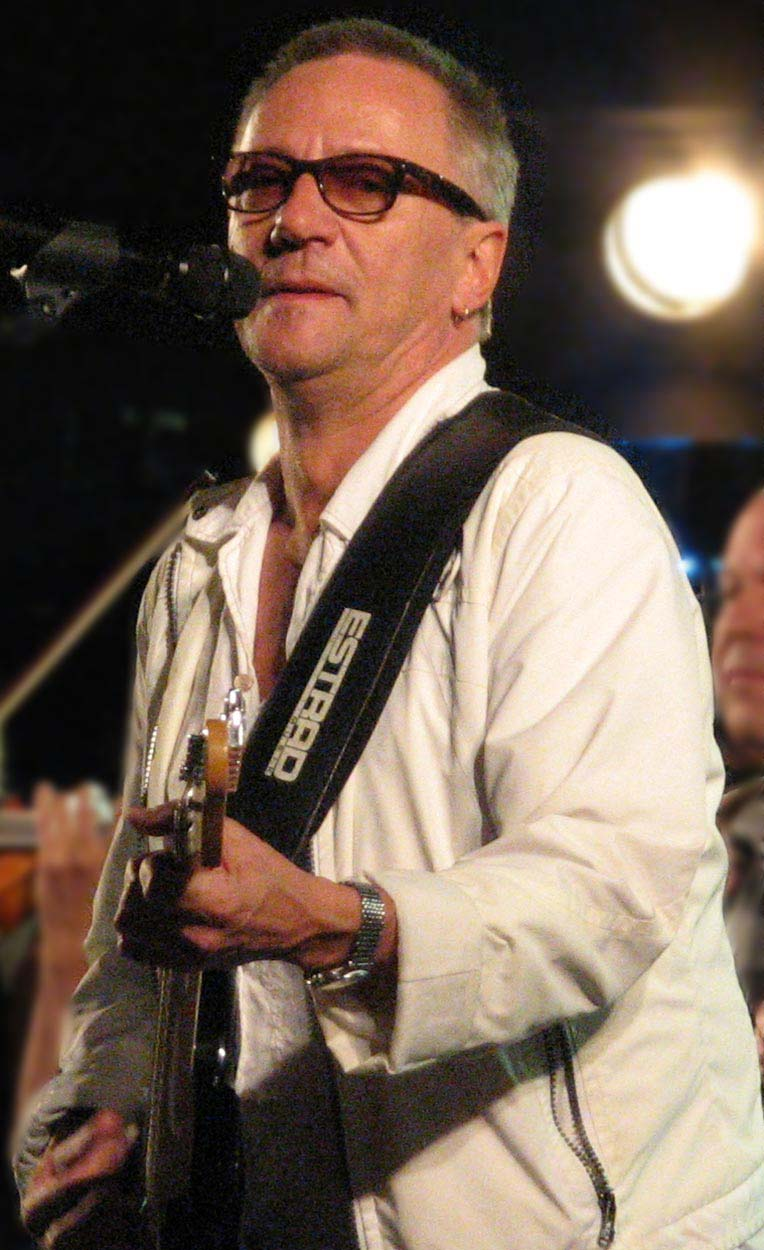
- Mats Ronander in Örebro, Sweden on August 30, 2008.

Background information
- Born: Mats Sture Ronander; 1 April 1954 (age 71); Sundsvall, Sweden
- Genres: Rock
- Occupations: Guitarist, vocalist
- Instruments: Guitar, vocals, harmonica
- Website: www.matsronander.se

Mats Ronander (born 1 April 1954) is a Swedish rock musician, guitarist, vocalist, record producer and composer.

== Biography ==
Ronander was born in Sundsvall, but grew up in Örebro. At the age of sixteen he succeeded Peps Persson as singer in the band Blues Quality. He was a member of the band Nature. The band backed up Ulf Lundell on a tour and three of Lundell's studio album as well as released a few records of their own. Mats Ronander has played live with ABBA on several occasions, as one of their guitarists, such as on their 1979 world tour.

The 1992 single "Gör mig lycklig nu" (written and performed with Dane Kim Larsen) and the album Himlen gråter för Elmore James produced by Mats Ronander, Mats Lindfors and Max Lorentz were Ronander's most successful solo projects. Ronander was also a member of Low budget blues band that released three albums. He was also a member of Grymlings.

Ronander produced Py Bäckman's breakthrough record Sista föreställningen, starred in the screen adaption of Ulf Lundell's novel Sömnen and toured with ABBA in United States. Ronander could clearly be seen upfront, center stage as one of the lead guitarists that performed live on the SVT production "Dick Cavett Meets ABBA" in 1981.

== Discography ==
=== Albums ===
- Hård kärlek (1981)
- God bok (1982)
- 50/50 (1984)
- Tokig (1985)
- Reality (1987)
- Rock'n'roll Biznis (1989)
- Himlen gråter för Elmore James (1992)
- Svenska popfavoriter Mats Ronander (Compilation album) (1995)
- Innanför staden (1996)
- Mats (2001)
- Bästa (Compilation album ) (2003)
- Ronander Live (2006)
- Malla Motell (2020)

=== Soundtracks ===
- Dödlig drift (1999)

=== Singles ===
- "Gör mig lycklig nu" (performed with Kim Larsen) (1992)
