= Lever mina drömmar =

Studio album by Shirley Clamp
- Released: 20 April 2005
- Genre: Pop

Shirley Clamp chronology
Den långsamma blomman (2004)	Lever mina drömmar (2005)	Favoriter på svenska (2006)

Lever mina drömmar is an album by Swedish pop singer Shirley Clamp. It was released on 20 April 2005 and peaked at number five on the Swedish Albums Chart. The song "Mina minnen" on the album was released as a single on 8 June 2005.

== Track listing ==
1. "Lever mina drömmar"
2. "Att älska dig"
3. "Sanslöst förlorad"
4. "En ny chans"
5. "Mina minnen"
6. "Jag ljuger dig full"
7. "Sjunde himlen"
8. "Längtan är allt jag har"
9. "Du sa tid"
10. "Lång natts färd mot dag"
11. "Ärliga blå"
12. "Dålig mottagning"
13. "Ensam"
14. "Som en vind i ditt hår"

== Charts ==
=== Weekly charts ===
Chart (2005)	Peak position
Swedish Albums (Sverigetopplistan)	5

=== Year-end charts ===
Chart (2005)	Position
Swedish Albums (Sverigetopplistan)	85
