= Ulf Lundell =

Musical artist

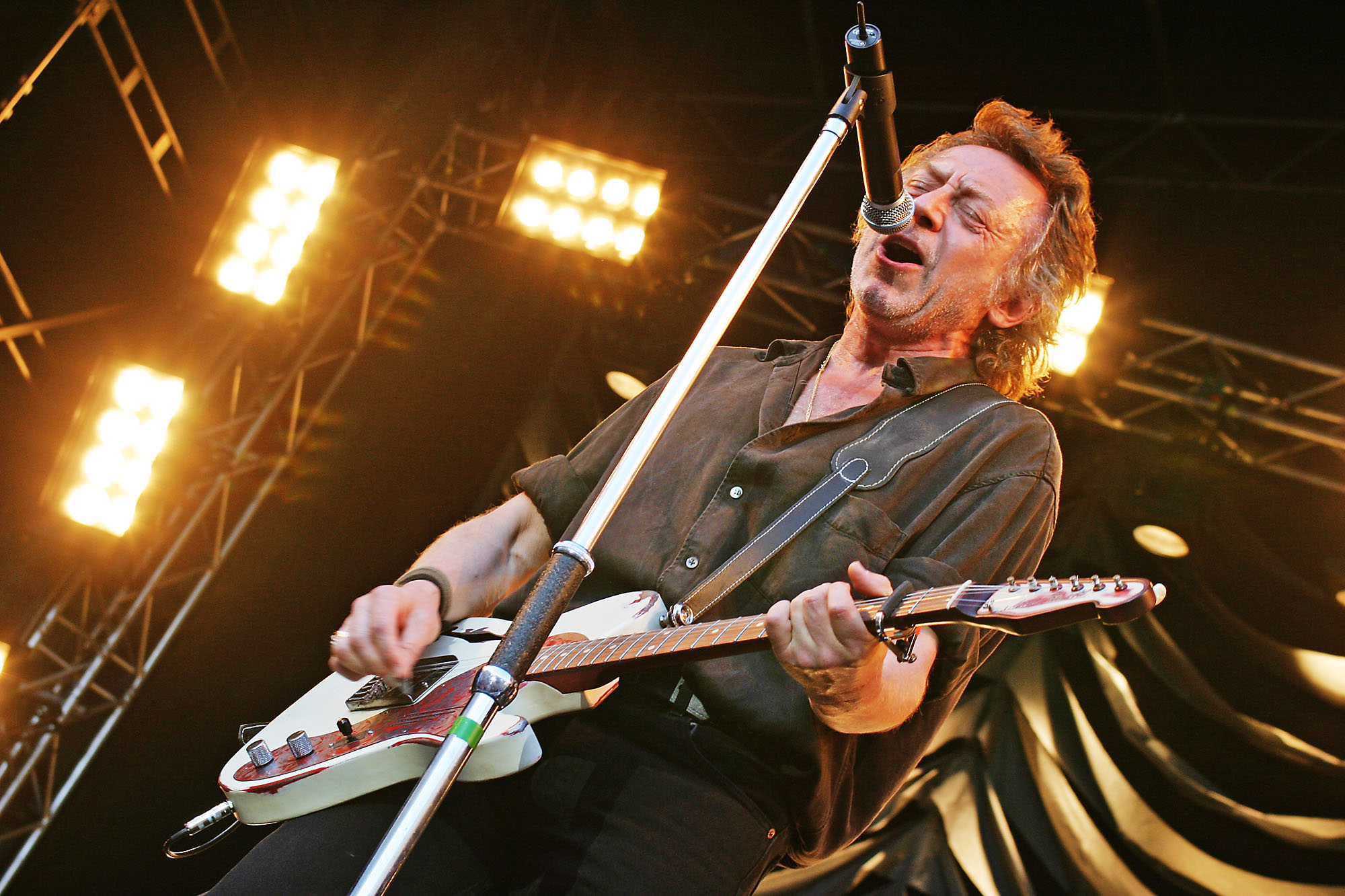
- Lundell on stage in Borgholm, Sweden in 2005

Background information
- Born: Ulf Gerhard Lundell; 20 November 1949 (age 76); Stockholm, Sweden
- Genres: Rock
- Occupations: Musician; songwriter; author; poet; screenwriter
- Instruments: Vocals; guitar; harmonica
- Years active: 1975–present
- Labels: EMI; Rockhead
- Website: www.ulflundell.com

Ulf Gerhard Lundell (born 20 November 1949) is a Swedish writer, poet, songwriter, composer, musician and artist.

He made his debut in 1975 with the LP Vargmåne and was immediately hailed as "Sweden's Bob Dylan". In 1976 his first novel, the partly autobiographical Jack was published by Wahlström & Widstrand. Lundell was influenced by musicians such as Bob Dylan, Bruce Springsteen, Neil Young and writers such as Jack Kerouac, Allen Ginsberg and other Beats. Ulf Lundell is one of the central figures in Swedish rock music and almost since his debut he has been one of the most important influences on rock musicians writing and singing in Swedish. Lundell is also somewhat controversial and has argued with everyone from neo-nazis, feminists and communists to colleagues and music journalists.

Lundell was known as a heavy drinker in the 1980s, but pulled out of overdrinking after serious bouts with alcoholism in 1985–87; he gave a vivid report of this time, his recovery and his struggle with the rocker myth in the autobiographical novel En varg söker sin flock (1989; "A Wolf in Search of his Pack")

"Öppna landskap" (Open landscapes) from 1982, one of his most famous songs, has been playfully proposed as Sweden's new national anthem.

== Biography ==
=== Origins and musical beginnings ===
Ulf Lundell's father was Gerhard Lundell a blacksmith worker and mother Ingrid (née Lindström) worked among other things as school meal assistant and seamstress. The family first lived in Stockholm in 1958 but moved to Saltsjö-Boo, east of Stockholm. At the age of ten he got his first guitar. Lundell has an older sister named Inger, whose boyfriend taught him his first chords. During the years 1967–75 Ulf Lundell had a variety of jobs, including postman. During these years he wrote songs and poems which he sent to record labels and publishers.

He sent a demo to MNW which they declined, telling him "the material was not strong enough". Later he sent two demos to Silence, which were also rejected. When he sent a demo to EMI in October 1974 they wanted to record an LP with him. In 1975 he made his debut with the album Vargmåne (Wolf Moon). The following year, 1976, came his first novel, Jack, with which he made his breakthrough. The novel is about rebellion against "Medelsvensson" (Average Joes) circumscribed life in the aftermath of the political uprising at the end of the 1960s. The book had an initial print run of 2,000 copies but ultimately sold 200,000 copies. Meanwhile, when his first work was released, he had already started recording the sequel to Vargmåne. The second album would be called Törst (Thirst) and released just three months after Jack. After that floated on the writing of books and two more were released during the 1970s. Törst was followed by the live album Natten hade varit mild och öm (The night was mild and tender) with Nature as backing band for years. The album Nådens år (Year of Grace) in 1978 year would become his third studio album including a duet with Agnetha Fältskog, "Snön faller och vi med den" ("Snow Falls And We With It"). In 1979 Lundell released his fourth studio album Ripp rapp with songs like "Rom i regnet" and "(Oh la la) Jag vill ha dej". Ripp rapp was more rock than his previous albums.

=== 1980s ===
In the fall of 1980 Lundell released the album Längre inåt landet, which was recorded in England. The album includes songs like "Glad igen" ("Happy Again") and "Stackars Jack" ("Poor Jack"). The latter was a comment on the criticism Lundell got from his debut novel Jack. Two years later, in 1982, he released the album "Kär och galen" (In love and crazy) that contained his most famous work, the song "Öppna landskap" ("Open landscapes"). It made him one of the biggest artists, and sold four times platinum. Other songs that became popular from Kär och galen was the title track "Kär och galen" and "När jag kysser havet" ("When I kiss the sea").

While waiting for a proper sequel to Kär och galen Lundell released two records, one in which he interpreted the English songs with Swedish lyrics (Sweethearts) and a completely acoustic album (12 sånger). Ulf wrestled with severe alcohol problems during this time, which among other things, led to the postponing of his upcoming album several times. During the summer tour in 1985, he did a real disastrous gig in Borgholm drunk, which put him on some headlines in the newspapers. In the fall Lundell released Den vassa eggen (The Sharp Edge), an album heavily influenced by the divorce Lundell went through at the time of recording. Den vassa eggen was very critically acclaimed and was followed by yet another scandal tour in the fall of that year. In 1987 Lundell released the only book Lundell acknowledged writing intoxicated, Tårpilen and also the album Det ljuva livet (The Good Life).

Lundell alcohol abuse got so bad that he joined Alcoholics Anonymous at this time. 1988 he stated that he had met God and was baptized shortly thereafter in the Ebeneser Church. His newfound Christian faith came to color in the album Evangeline, which was released the same year. 1989 he released his autobiography En varg söker sin flock ("A Wolf in Search of his Pack") and the album Utanför murarna (Outside the Walls). He has also been active as a visual artist from 1989.

=== 1990-2005 ===
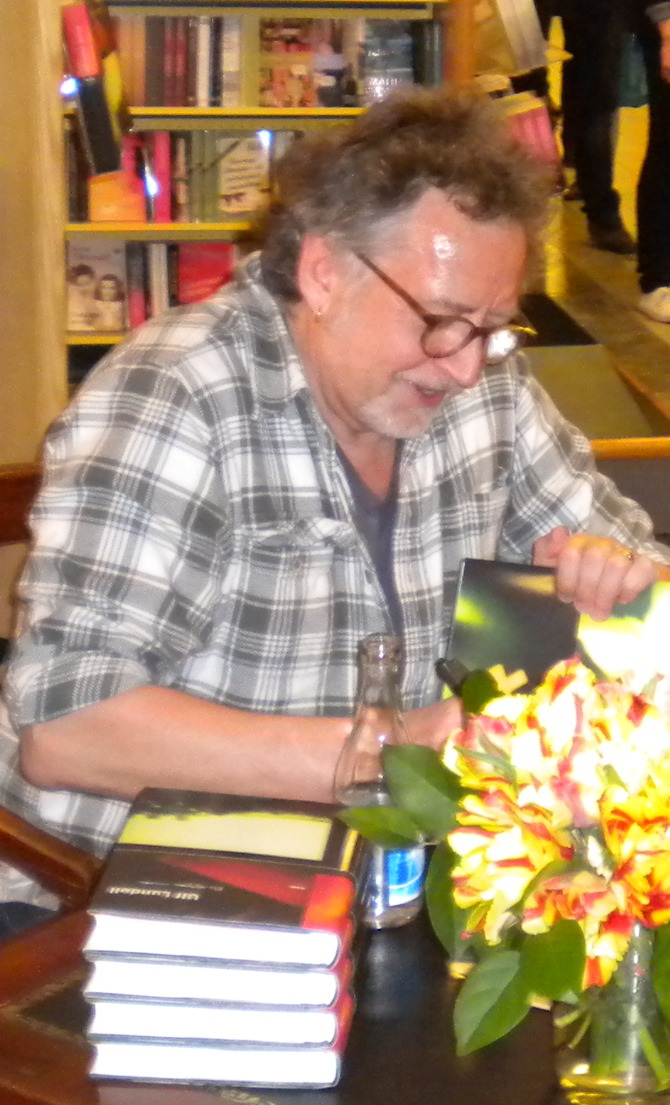
Lundell signing En öppen vinter, Stockholm 2010.

It took until 1992 for Lundell to release a new book or album with the novel Saknaden. The book came to be the first installment of a trilogy. 1993 he released the album Måne över Haväng, which contains songs that include "Rött" and "Isabella". This was the first album that Lundell produced entirely by himself. 1994 he formed his own production company Rockhead Studios AB and its subsidiaries Rockhead Productions and Rockhead Art and secondary name Rockhead Music. That same year he released the acoustic album Xavante. At this time Lundell invested more in music than on writing.

In 1995 Lundell celebrated 20 years as an artist. The following year he released double album På andra sidan drömmarna and the live album Bosnia. At this time one can notice that he was inspired more by Neil Young than before Springsteen and Dylan. Especially with the album Fanzine (1999), which is a disc that is partially recorded in a studio and partly live. 1999 he released his first book in seven years, the sequel to the novel Saknaden, called Friheten.

The album I ett vinterland (2000) became his second best-selling album. The album was followed two years later with the double album Club Zebra, an album that was number one in Sweden October 17, 2002. Then followed four studio albums until 2005, the acoustic En eld ikväll and album trilogy Ok Ok Baby, Högtryck and Lazarus. 2005 was a very productive year for Lundell with two albums and the novel Värmen, the last part of a trilogy with Saknaden and Friheten. This was the year he celebrated 30 years as an artist.

=== 2008-present ===
In the autumn of 2008, Lundell toured for the first time in over two years and also released his first studio album in three years. During the tour premiere of Gävle Lundell told the newspapers he was about to stop touring. The tour continued in 2009 with one in the spring and one in the summer. In connection with these he admits that he lied and will not stop touring. He explains that he is about to take farewell from his artistic career, but it's a long farewell. 2010 Lundell released a new book, En öppen vinter, also containing a CD with 11 new songs.

In the summer of 2010, Lundell embarked on a new tour in which he broke the audience record for a Swedish artist at Gröna Lund on 30 July. The concert was attended by 22,827 people; with that figure, he is only beaten by Bob Marley (32,000) and Lady Gaga (23,000).

A concert tour that Lundell would have embarked on in the spring of 2011 was completely cancelled due to sickness.

== Personal life ==
Lundell was married the first time in 1977 to Barbro Zackrisson. They broke up in 1988. In 1989, Lundell married Fredrika Stjärne, they broke up in 1991. He has three children from his first marriage, including the journalist Sanna Lundell, and one from the other. During the mid-1990s, he was dating the poet Isabella Nerman (whom he also wrote a song about, simply called "Isabella"). During a period in the 2000s he was living with Ulrika Rickfors.

== Discography ==
=== Studio albums ===
List of albums, with selected chart positions
Title	Album details	Peak chart positions		Certifications
Title	Album details	SWE	NOR	Certifications
Vargmåne	Released: 3 September 1975; Label: Harvest; Format: LP, cassette, CD	38	—	
Törst	Released: 6 June 1976; Label: Harvest, EMI; Format: LP, CS, CD	12	—	
Nådens år	Released: 18 April 1978; Label: Parlophone, EMI; Format: LP, CS, CD	4	—	
Ripp rapp	Released: 4 September 1979; Label: Parlophone; Format: LP, CS, CD	3	—	
Längre inåt landet	Released: 12 September 1980; Label: Parlophone; Format: LP, CS, CD	2	—	
Kär och galen	Released: 5 April 1982; Label: EMI; Format: LP, CS, CD	1	3	
Sweethearts	Released: 20 March 1984; Label: EMI; Format: LP, CS, CD	1	5	
12 sånger	Released: 21 November 1984; Label: Pandion, EMI; Format: LP, CS, CD	12	—	
Den vassa eggen	Released: 21 October 1985; Label: Pandion, EMI; Format: LP, CS, CD	1	—	
Det goda livet	Released: 18 November 1987; Label: Pandion, EMI; Format: LP, CS, CD	5	—	GLF: Gold
Evangeline	Released: 3 October 1988; Label: Pandion, EMI; Format: LP, CS, CD	5	—	GLF: Gold
Utanför murarna	Released: 7 November 1989; Label: Pandion, EMI; Format: LP, CS, CD	7	—	GLF: Gold
Måne över Haväng	Released: 4 May 1993; Label: Pandion, EMI; Format: LP, CS, CD	2	—	GLF: Gold
Xavante	Released: 24 November 1994; Label: EMI; Format: LP, CD	2	—	GLF: Gold
På andra sidan drömmarna	Released: 25 October 1996; Label: EMI; Format: CD	1	—	GLF: Gold
Män utan kvinnor	Released: 7 November 1997; Label: EMI; Format: CD	4	31	GLF: Gold
Slugger	Released: 28 October 1998; Label: EMI; Format: CD	1	30	
Fanzine	Released: 27 May 1999; Label: EMI; Format: CD	6	38	
I ett vinterland	Released: 20 November 2000; Label: EMI; Format: LP, CD	1	—	GLF: Platinum
Club Zebra	Released: 7 October 2002; Label: Capitol; Format: LP, CD	1	36	GLF: Gold
En eld ikväll	Released: 26 November 2003; Label: Capitol; Format: CD	1	—	GLF: Gold
OK Baby OK	Released: 11 November 2004; Label: Capitol; Format: CD	1	—	GLF: Gold
Högtryck	Released: 25 May 2005; Label: Capitol; Format: LP, CD	1	39	
Lazarus	Released: 28 September 2005; Label: Capitol; Format: CD	2	—	
Omaha	Released: 19 November 2008; Label: Capitol; Format: LP, CD	1	40	GLF: Gold
Rent förbannat	Released: 3 October 2012; Label: Rockhead, Capitol; Format: LP, CD	1	13	GLF: Gold
Trunk	Released: 20 November 2013; Label: Parlophone; Format: LP, CD	1	25	GLF: Gold
Skisser	Released: 27 April 2018; Label: Parlophone; Format: LP, CD	2	—	
Tranorna kommer	Released: 17 May 2019; Label: Parlophone; Format: LP, CD	3	—	
Omaha: Ruff	Released: 4 October 2019; Label: Parlophone; Format: CD	18	—	
Telegram	Released: 27 November 2020; Label: Parlophone; Format: LP, CD	1	—	
Rött guld	Released: 1 December 2023; Label: Parlophone; Format: LP, CD	11	—	
"—" denotes a recording that did not chart or was not released in that territory.

=== Live albums ===
List of albums, with selected chart positions
Title	Album details	Peak chart positions
Title	Album details	SWE
Natten hade varit mild och öm (with Nature)	Released: 20 April 1977; Label: EMI; Format: LP, CS, CD	10
Maria kom tillbaka	Released: 19 November 1993; Label: EMI; Format: LP, CD	3
Bosnia	Released: 23 February 1996; Label: EMI; Format: CD	4
Roskilde Orange Stage 2 juli 1999	Released: 22 June 2011; Label: Capitol; Format: LP, CD	4
Unplugged Solo	Released: 22 June 2011; Label: Capitol; Format: LP, CD	3
Rockhead live: #1 Sthlm Berns 22 dec. 2019	Released: 17 April 2020; Label: Parlophone; Format: Digital	—
Rockhead live: #2 Göta Lejon, Sthlm 21 okt. 1980	Released: 17 April 2020; Label: Parlophone; Format: Digital	—
Cirkus: Corona	Released: 26 March 2021; Label: Capitol; Format: LP, CD	6
Live på Tyrol	Released: 1 November 2024; Label: Parlophone; Format: LP, CD	15

=== Compilation albums ===
List of albums, with selected chart positions
Title	Album details	Peak chart positions		Certifications
Title	Album details	SWE	NOR	Certifications
Preskriberade romanser	Released: 16 December 1981; Label: EMI; Format: LP, CD	4	—	
Innan jag anfölls av indianerna	Released: 17 December 1981; Label: EMI; Format: LP	—	—	
Livslinjen, 1975–91	Released: 17 December 1991; Label: EMI; Format: LP, CD	22	—	
Rebeller	Released: February 1995; Label: Ravelli Music; Format: CD	—	—	
Öppna landskap 7595	Released: 20 November 1995; Label: EMI; Format: CS, CD	3	—	GLF: Gold
Slutna rum 7595	Released: 20 November 1995; Label: EMI; Format: CS, CD	13	—	
Når jeg kysser havet – Ulf Lundells beste	Released: 20 November 1995; Label: EMI; Format: CD	—	6	
När jag kysser havet – Det bästa 1: 75–84	Released: 15 March 2006; Label: Capitol; Format: CD	16	—	
Danielas hus – Det bästa 2: 84–94	Released: 15 March 2006; Label: Capitol; Format: CD	12	—	
Venus & Jupiter – Det bästa 3: 95–05	Released: 15 March 2006; Label: Capitol; Format: CD	20	—	
Under vulkanen, 1972–2007	Released: 28 November 2007; Label: Capitol; Format: CD+DVD	18	—	
Original Album Series	Released: 6 June 2012; Label: EMI; Format: CD	44	—	
40!	Released: 17 June 2015; Label: Parlophone; Format: CD	3	—	
Hemåt genom Rift Valley 1975–2015	Released: 27 November 2015; Label: Parlophone; Format: CD	12	—	
Två blåa ögon	Released: 25 June 2021; Label: Parlophone; Format: streaming	—	—	
Andra landskap	Released: 5 December 2025; Label: Parlophone; Format: 2×CD, streaming	19	—	

== Bibliography ==
Novels

- 1976: Jack
- 1977: Sömnen
- 1979: Vinter i paradiset
- 1981: Kyssen
- 1983: Hjärtats ljus
- 1987: Tårpilen
- 1989: En varg söker sin flock
- 1992: Saknaden
- 1999: Friheten
- 2003: Frukost på en främmande planet
- 2004: Mer än hennes mun
- 2005: Värmen
- 2008: Vädermannen
- 2011: Allt är i rörelse
- 2014: Visenterna

Lyrical prose

- 2010: En öppen vinter (lyrical prose texts)

Poetry

- 1972: Modus Vivendi, Molngrabb!
- 1979: Fruset guld
- 1981: Det är långt mellan lycka och leda
- 1984: Tid för kärlek

Plays

- 2009: 6 pjäser
