= För att du finns =

Single by Sonja Aldén

from the album Till dig
- A-side: "För att du finns"
- B-side: "För att du finns (acoustic version)", "För att du finns" (background version)
- Released: 26 February 2007
- Genre: Schlager
- Label: Lionheart International
- Songwriters: Bobby Ljunggren, Sonja Aldén

Ann-Louise Hanson, Towa Carson & Siw Malmkvist singles chronology
| "Etymon" (2006) | "För att du finns" (2007) | "Här star jag" (2007) |

"För att du finns" is a song written by Bobby Ljunggren and Sonja Aldén. Sonja Aldén performed the song during the third semifinal of Melodifestivalen 2007 in Örnsköldsvik on 17 February 2007. The song ended up in third place, and reached the finals through Andra chansen. At the finals in the Stockholm Globe Arena, the song ended up in sixth place.

On 26 February 2007, the single was released. It peaked at number three on the Swedish singles chart.

The song charted at Svensktoppen, entering the chart on 29 April 2007. There it ended up 5th during the first week. On 20 May 2007 it reached first place. It stayed at that position for 26 weeks, which resulted in the third longest period a song had topped Svensktoppen, only to be knocked down to the second place on 18 November 2007 by "Om du lämnade mig nu" by Lars Winnerbäck and Miss Li. On 30 December 2007 the song was at Svensktoppen for the 35th and final time, before being knocked out from the chart. The song became a major hit, and became the most successful Svensktoppen song of 2007 based on the chart's calculation system, where it received 15 363 points.

== Track listing ==
1. För att du finns
2. För att du finns (acoustic version)
3. För att du finns (background version)

== Charts ==
=== Weekly charts ===
| Chart (2007) | Peak position |
|---|---|
| Sweden (Sverigetopplistan) | 3 |

=== Year-end charts ===
| Chart (2007) | Position |
|---|---|
| Sweden (Sverigetopplistan) | 16 |
