= För den som älskar =

Single by Shirley Clamp

from the album Den långsamma blomman
- Released: 2004
- Genre: schlager
- Length: mm:ss
- Songwriters: Peder Ernerot and Gustave Lund

"För den som älskar", written by Peder Ernerot and Gustave Lund, is a song performed by Shirley Clamp released as a single from her studio album Den långsamma blomman. At the Swedish singles chart, it peaked at number 14. The song also charted at Svensktoppen for five weeks during the period 12 December 2004–9 January 2005 before leaving chart. It peaked at # 4 there.

== Track listing ==
1. "För den som älskar"
2. "Den långsamma blomman"

== Charts ==
Chart (2004)	Peak position
Sweden	14
