= Omaha (album) =

Studio album by Ulf Lundell
- Released: 19 November 2008
- Recorded: Decibel Studios and Sveriges Radio Studio 2, Stockholm, Sweden/Rockhead Studio, Österlen, Sweden
- Genre: Rock
- Length: 1:51:00
- Label: Rockhead/EMI
- Producer: Kjell Andersson, Dag Lundquist, Ulf Lundell

Ulf Lundell chronology
Under vulkanen, 1972-2007 (2007)	Omaha (2008)	Club Zebra Live (2009)

Omaha is a 2008 studio album by Ulf Lundell. The album saw Lundell working with Kjell Andersson for the first time in 19 years, an experience that Lundell deemed unpleasant and the "worst album-recording of his career". However, the album proved successful in Sweden, peaking at number one on the Swedish Albums Chart. It also peaked at number 40 on the Norwegian Albums Chart.

== Track listing ==
1. Omaha - 5.28
2. Butiken - 5.11
3. Hitza hitz - 4.11
4. Lär dej älska mörkret - 5.41
5. Lilla kärleken - 3.32
6. Underbar morgon - 5.28
7. Rik man - 4.06
8. Pissväderspolska - 3.02
9. Spike - 2.38
10. Under natten regn - 3.50
11. Din tid är ute - 4.54
12. På ett vallmofält - 3.22
13. Innan 20 på 19 - 8.33
14. Tillbaka till världen - 5.01
15. Koltrastsången - 5.06

== Contributors ==
- Ulf Lundell - song, acoustic guitar, munspel, bass mandolin & choir
- Jens Frithiof – electric guitar, acoustic guitar, rickenbacker 12:a, slide, e bow, mandolin, banjo, bouzouki, pedal steel
- Marcus Olsson - hammond, piano, synth, tramporgel, mellotron, celeste, clarinet, bass clarinet, soprano saxophone, tenorsax, baritone saxophone, flute
- Jerker Odelholm - electric bass, double bass
- Andreas Dahlbäck - drums, percussion, timpani, marimba, vibraphone
- David Nyström - choir
- Mauro Scocco - choir
- Josef Zackrisson - choir
- Samuel Andersson - violin, Mora harp, octave violin, slagburdun
- Anna Dager - cello
- Carl Zim Lundell - electric guitar
- Charlotte Berg - song
- Stockholm Session Strings members - strings

== Charts ==
=== Weekly charts ===
Chart (2008–2009)	Peak position
Norwegian Albums (VG-lista)	40
Swedish Albums (Sverigetopplistan)	1

=== Year-end charts ===
Chart (2008)	Position
Swedish Albums (Sverigetopplistan)	35
