= Sonja Aldén =

Swedish singer (born 1977)

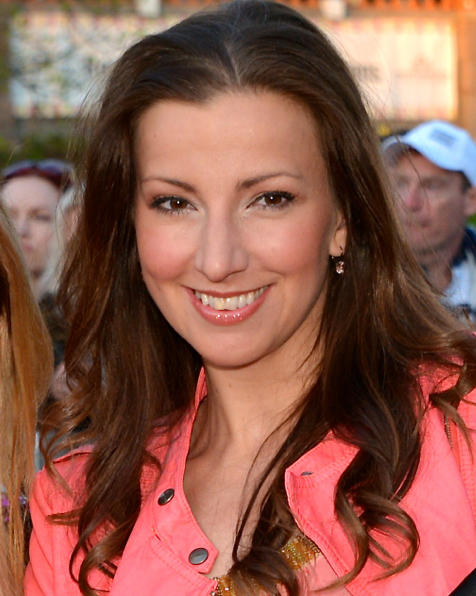
- Aldén in 2013

Background information
- Born: Sonja Annika Maria Aldén; 20 December 1977 (age 48); St Albans, Hertfordshire, England
- Origin: Sweden
- Genres: Pop; schlager
- Occupations: Singer; songwriter
- Website: www.sonjaalden.se

Sonja Annika Maria Aldén (born 20 December 1977) is a Swedish pop singer best known for her 2006, 2007, 2012, and 2020 Melodifestivalen entries, as well as for working together with Shirley Clamp and Sanna Nielsen. She has also written songs for other artists, including "Night of Passion" for The Poodles, which was their entry for the Melodifestivalen 2006.

== Early life ==
Aldén was born in St Albans, England. As a student, she attended the Adolf Fredrik's Music School in Stockholm.

== Career ==
In the Swedish Melodifestivalen 2006, Aldén presented as Sonya and participated with "Etymon" but did not qualify for the final.

In the Melodifestivalen 2007, Aldén participated with the ballad "För att du finns", which reached "Andra Chansen" ("Second chance") when it finished 4th in the semifinal in Örnsköldsvik on 17 February 2007.

Aldén returned to the Melodifestivalen 2012, after five years of absence, with her song "I din himmel" (In Your Heaven), but did not qualify for the final.

During the spring of 2017, she toured Sweden with the album "Meningen med livet".

On 26 November 2019, SVT and Eurovision announced that Aldén would be among the 28 competing acts for Melodifestivalen 2020. She performed in the first semifinal with the song "Sluta aldrig gå", failing to qualify and ending in fifth place.

== Discography ==
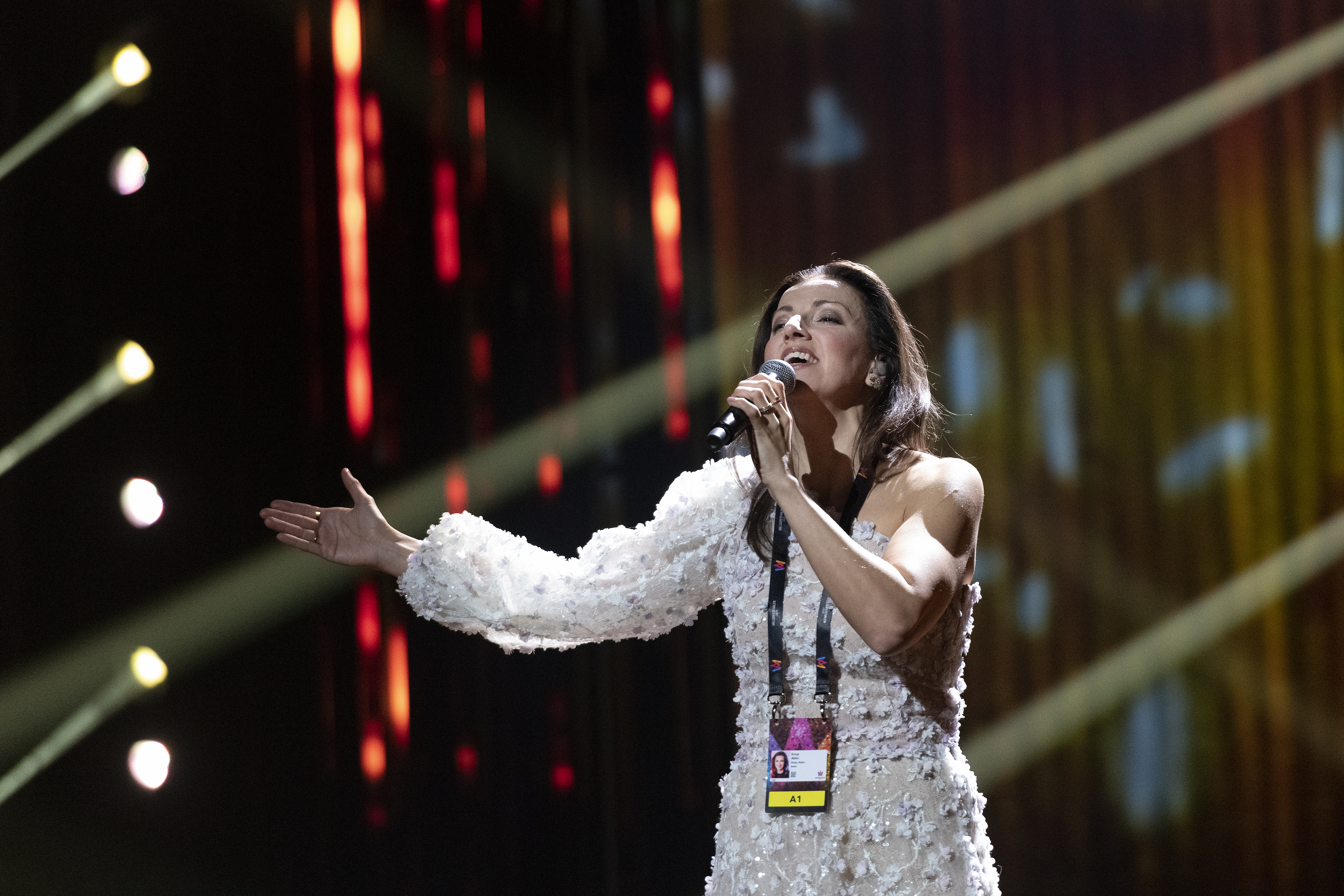
Aldén performing in 2020

=== Albums ===
Year	Album	Peak Position	Certifications
Year	Album	SWE	Certifications
2007	Till dig	2	
2008	Under mitt tak	3	
2012	I gränslandet	12	
2013	I andlighetens rum	4	
2014	Jul i andlighetens rum	6	
2017	Meningen med livet	10	

=== Joint albums ===
Title	Details	Peak positions	Certifications
Title	Details	SWE	Certifications
Our Christmas (Sanna, Shirley & Sonja)	First joint album; Released: November 2008	1	SWE: Platinum
Vår jul (Sanna, Shirley & Sonja)	Second joint album; Released: November 2010	6	SWE: Gold

=== Singles ===
Year	Single	Peak Position	Album
Year	Single	SWE	Album
2006	"Etymon" (credited as Sonya)	35	
2007	"För att du finns"	3	
2007	"Här står jag"	16	
2008	"Nån som du"	29	
2008	"Du får inte"	17	
2020	"Sluta aldrig gå"	— (Note: "Sluta aldrig gå" did not enter the Swedish Singellista Chart, but peaked at number 13 on the Swedish Heatseeker Chart.)	

As Sanna, Shirley, Sonja

Year	Single	Peak Position	Album
Year	Single	SWE	Album
2008	"All I Want for Christmas"	39	Our Christmas
2008	"My Grown Up Christmas List"	41	Our Christmas
