= Zekes =

- Origin: Skara, Sweden
- Genres: Dansband music
- Years active: 2009-2012

Zekes was a dansband, established in January 2009 in Skara, Sweden. The band participated at Dansbandskampen 2009, where they reached the final. On 27 December 2009, the song "I ett fönster" entered Svensktoppen.

In June 2012, SR Skaraborg announced that the band was to become disestablished following the 2012 summer tour, with their final appearance at Matfestivalen in Skövde in August that year.

== Members ==
- Rickard Carlsson (vocals, guitar)
- Mathias Johansson (bass)
- Jakob Stenseke (saxophone, guitar, vocals)
- Anton Johansson (keyboard, saxophone, vocals)
- Simon Warnskog (drums)

== Discography ==
=== Albums ===
Title	release
En så'n natt	2010
Vi lyfter igen	2011

=== Singles ===
Title	release
I ett fönster	2009
Frosty the Snowman	

== Svensktoppen songs ==
- I ett fönster- 2009

=== Svensktoppen test (failed to enter chart) ===
- Vi lyfter igen-2011
- Samma sak- 2012
