= Shirley Clamp =

British Swedish pop singer

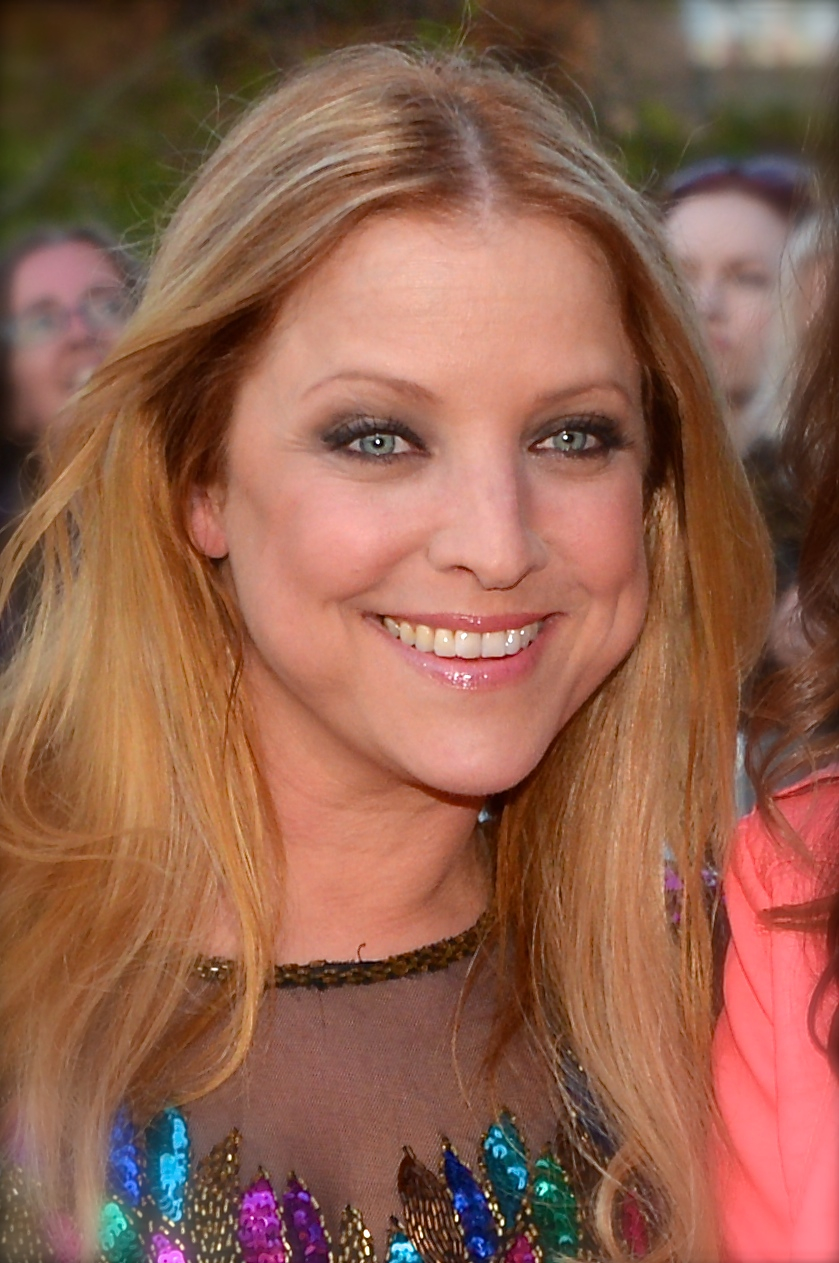
- Shirley Clamp, 2013

Background information
- Born: 17 February 1973 (age 53); Borås, Sweden
- Origin: Sweden
- Genres: Pop, Schlager
- Years active: 2000–present
- Website: shirleyclamp.com

Shirley Natasja Clamp (born 17 February 1973) is a British-Swedish pop singer. She has achieved four Top 10 singles in Sweden including a Number 1 with "Med hjärtat fyllt av ljus" in 2009, and three Top 10 albums. She has competed seven times in Melodifestivalen between 2003 and 2022, reaching the final twice where she finished second in 2004 and fourth in 2005.

== Nationality ==
Clamp was born in Borås, Sweden. Since her mother is Swedish and her father is British, she has dual nationality.

== Career ==
Shirley Clamp's career began as a backing singer for various singers and groups, including Antique during their Eurovision Song Contest 2001 performance to name one.

She started her solo career in 2003, when she took part in Melodifestivalen 2003 with the song "Mr. Memory". Finishing in 6th place in her semifinal, she lost the chance to qualify for the final. Her big breakthrough came in Melodifestivalen 2004 with the song "Min kärlek" (My love) composed by Ingela "Pling" Forsman. She came fourth in the last semifinal and went on to take second place at Andra Chansen, the "second chance" semifinal, thus qualifying for the final. There she was the first artist on stage, and ended 2nd, behind Lena Philipsson's immensely popular winner, "Det gör ont". "Min kärlek" won the National Finals Song Contest. A little later, in May 2004, Shirley released her first studio album, Den långsamma blomman (The Slow Flower).

In 2005, she tried once again to win Melodifestivalen, with the song "Att älska dig" ("To love you"). Shirley won the first semifinal, but in the final in Stockholm, she ended 4th. Her second studio album, Lever mina drömmar (Living my dreams) was released in April 2005. A year later, she released Favoriter på svenska, a special covers album, containing songs with lyrics in Swedish, such as Roxette's "It Must Have Been Love" ("När kärleken föds").

Clamp appeared at Melodifestivalen again in 2009 with the song "Med hjärtat fyllt av ljus". She placed last in the first semi-final, but eventually received a Swedish #1 single with the song. She was also a commentator for SVT during the Eurovision Song Contest 2009. Shirley returned to Melodifestivalen in 2011 with "Shirley's Angels", alongside Vera Prada and Jessica Marberger, with the song "I Thought It Was Forever." The trio competed in the third heat and advanced to Andra Chansen, where they were knocked out in the fourth duel against Pernilla Andersson.

Three years later she tried her luck participating at Melodifestivalen 2014 with the song "Burning Alive" which was composed by Bobby Ljunggren, Marcos Ubeda, Sharon Vaughn and Henrik Wikstrom. Shirley competed in the third Semi-final and finished 6th for a second time, failing to qualify for the next round. This was the 4th time she didn't make it to the final, the first being on the 2003 contest.

She presented the Second chance round of Melodifestivalen 2021.

In 2022, she entered Melodifestivalen 2022 with the song "Let There Be Angels". She performed in Heat 1 on 5 February 2022, finishing in sixth place and failing to qualify to the final. In 2024, she had a lead role in the SVT Christmas calendar ”Snödrömmar”.

== Melodifestivalen entries ==
As a performer

- 2003 - "Mr Memory" (6th in semifinal)
- 2004 - "Min kärlek" (2nd)
- 2005 - "Att älska dig" (4th)
- 2009 - "Med hjärtat fyllt av ljus" (8th in semifinal)
- 2011 - "I Thought it was Forever" (Shirley's Angels) (knocked out in Andra Chansen round)
- 2014 - "Burning Alive" (6th in semifinal)
- 2022 - "Let There Be Angels" (6th in semifinal)

As a composer

- 2003 - "You" performed by Pandora (Did not qualify for the final)*

== Discography ==
=== Albums ===
Album information
Den långsamma blomman
- Studio album
- Released: 26 May 2004
- Chart positions: #3 SE
- Certification: Gold
- Singles:
  - 2003 "Jag fick låna en ängel"
  - 2004 "Min kärlek" #3
  - 2004 "Eviga längtan" #24
  - 2004 "För den som älskar" #14
Lever mina drömmar
- Studio album
- Released: 20 April 2005
- Chart positions: #5 SE
- Certification: -
- Singles:
  - 2005 "Att älska dig" #4
  - 2005 "Mina minnen"
  - 2005 "Lite som du" #38
  - 2006 "Lever mina drömmar"
Favoriter på svenska
- Covers of Swedish hits album
- Released: 10 May 2006
- Chart positions: #7 SE
- Certification: -
- Singles:
  - 2006 "När kärleken föds" (Swedish cover version of Roxette's "It Must Have Been Love") #6
  - 2006 "I en annan del av världen"
Tålamod
- Studio Album
- Released: 24 October 2007
- Chart positions: #20 SE
- Certification: -
- Singles:
  - 2007 "Jag tar en annan väg"
För den som älskar - en samling
- Greatest hits compilation
- Released: 28 March 2009
- Chart positions: #11 SE
- Certification: -
- Singles:
  - 2009 "Med hjärtat fyllt av ljus" #1
Så milt lyser stjärnan
- Studio album
- Released: 20 November 2015
- Chart position: #30 SE

=== Joint albums ===
Title	Details	Peak positions	Certifications
Title	Details	SWE	Certifications
Our Christmas (Sanna, Shirley & Sonja)	First joint album; Released: November 2008	1	SWE: Platinum
Vår jul (Sanna, Shirley & Sonja)	Second joint album; Released: November 2010	6	SWE: Gold

=== Other singles ===
- 2002 - My Life (C'est ma vie) (with Christer Björkman) (Pride-anthem 2002)
- 2003 - Mr. Memory
- 2004 - Do They Know It's Christmas? #28
