= Curt Haagers =

Swedish dansband

- Also known as: Five Spots (1966)
- Origin: Gothenburg, Sweden
- Genres: Dansband
- Years active: 1966–2006
- Label: Platina

Curt Haagers was a Swedish dansband formed in Gothenburg in 1966.

== Discography ==
=== Studio albums ===
- 1973 - Det går som en dans 2
- 1975 - Ta mej mé
- 1977 - Min symfoni
- 1978 - Tinge linge ling
- 1981 - Santa Maria
- 1981 - Dansa kvack kvack
- 1982 - En spännande dag för Josefine
- 1983 - Guld och gröna skogar
- 1984 - Agadoo
- 1985 - Ännu doftar kärlek
- 1986 - Curt Haagers -87
- 1988 - Curt Haagers -88
- 1989 - Riktiga vänner
- 1990 - Curt Haagers 10
- 1992 - Curt Haagers 11
- 1994 - Curt Haagers 12
- 1997 - Curt Haagers 13

=== Compilation albums ===
- 1975 - Goa 10-i-topp bitar
- 2002 - Curt Haagers guldkorn
- 2007 - Våra mest önskade
- 2008 - Guldkorn vol. 2

== Svensktoppen songs ==
- Tingelingeling - 1978
- Du hänger väl med opp - 1981
- Hands Up - 1981-1982
- Fågeldansen - 1982
- Ännu doftar kärlek - 1985
- Med dej i mina armar - 1986
- Ta mej till havet - 1986
- När du går över floden - 1988
- Riktiga vänner - 1989
- Jag kan se dig i mina ögon - 1990
- Varma vindar och soligt hav - 1991
- Bruna ögon - 1991
- Det är kärlek - 1993
- Skriv ett brev - 1997
- När jag blundar - 1997
- Du är det käraste - 1999
