= Henrik Wikström =

Swedish songwriter and music producer (born 1963)

- Born: 16 May 1963 (age 62); Skellefteå, Sweden
- Occupations: songwriter, record producer
- Labels: Lionheart International

Lars Henrik Wikström (born 1963) is a Swedish songwriter and music producer. He has entered the Eurovision Song Contest as a composer for Sweden in 2006 with the song "Invincible". The song was performed by Carola Häggkvist and placed 5th in the final.

Wikström grew up in Skellefteå. In high school, he wrote and recorded a rock opera called Selecta, which was recorded on a LP. He later toured to Stockholm with two performances and studied in Piteå Academy of Music.

Henrik is a veteran of the Melodifestivalen competition, the Swedish preselection for the Eurovision Song Contest, having written 34 songs between 1983 and 2017.

== Eurovision and Pre-Selection Entries ==
- Sweden 2006 - ”Invincible” - Carola, 1st place in Melodifestivalen 2006, representing Sweden at Eurovision 2006
- Romania 2008 - ”Shine” - Biondo, 2nd place in Selecția Națională
- Romania 2008 - ”Dr Frankenstein” - LaGaylia Frazier, 10th place in Selecția Națională
- Sweden 2014 - ”Survivor” - Helena Paparizou, 4th place in Melodifestivalen 2014
- Sweden 2014 - ”Burning Alive” - Shirley Clamp
- Sweden 2014 - ”En himmelsk sång” - Ellinore Holmer
- Ukraine 2014 - ”Courageous” - neAngely, 5th place
- Azerbaijan 2016 - ”Miracle” - Samra, representing Azerbaijan at Eurovision 2016
- Sweden 2016 - ”Constellation Prize” - Robin Bengtsson, 5th place in Melodifestivalen 2016
