= Roxette discography =

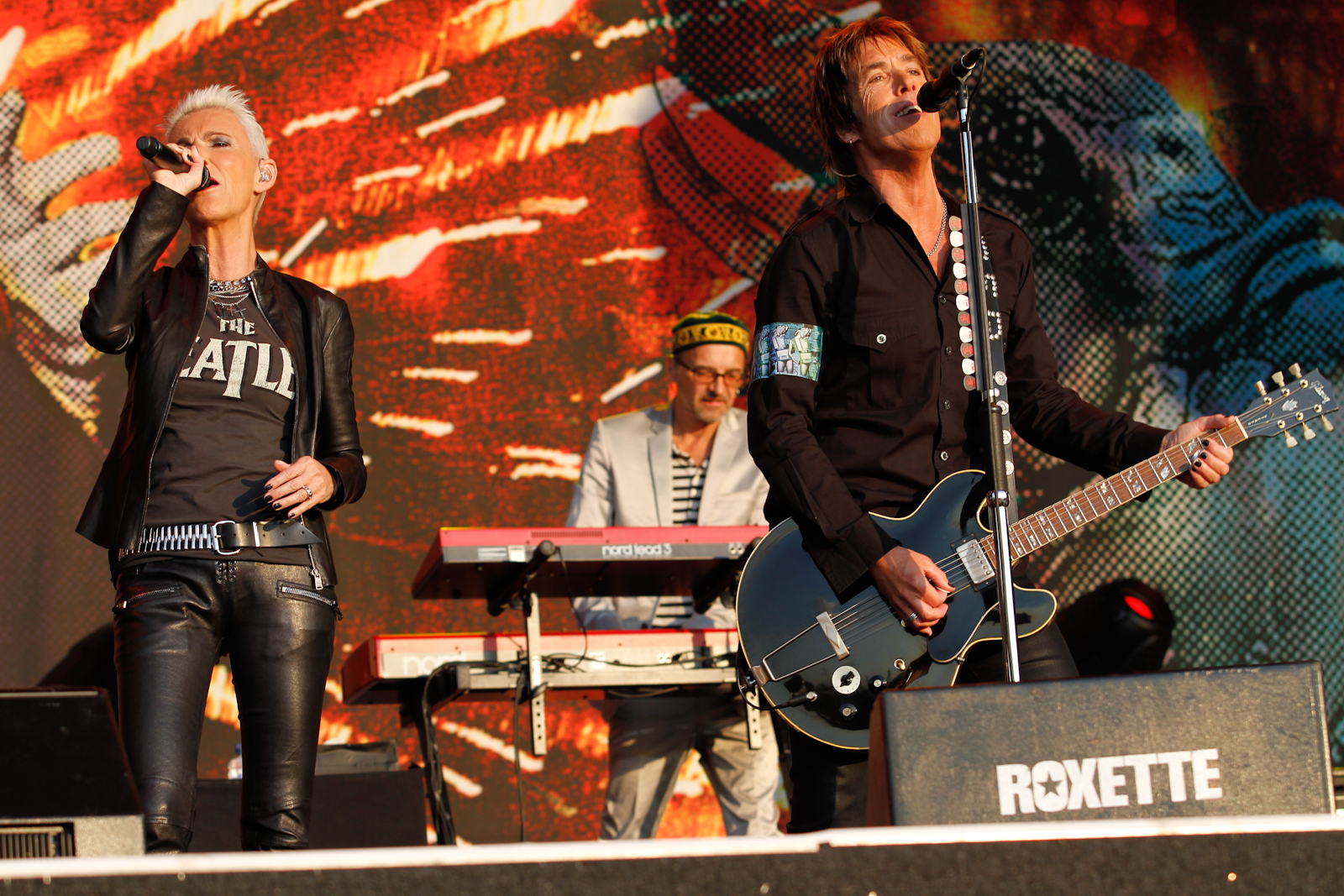
- Roxette on stage in Weert 2011
- Studio albums: 10
- Live albums: 1
- Compilation albums: 13
- Singles: 56
- Video albums: 11
- Music videos: 52
- Promotional singles: 20
- Remix albums: 1
- Box sets: 3

Swedish pop rock duo Roxette has released ten studio albums (including six Swedish number ones), one live album, thirteen compilation albums, one remix album, eleven video albums, three box sets, fifty-six singles (including three Swedish and four US number ones) and twenty promotional singles, as well as fifty-two music videos. The duo, which consisted of Per Gessle and Marie Fredriksson, are the second most commercially successful Swedish act of all time, after ABBA. They sold over 75 million records worldwide, although a report by the Los Angeles Times put the figure as high as 80 million. The RIAA awarded them certifications of 3.5 million units in the US, where the duo have sold over two million albums since Nielsen SoundScan began tracking sales data in May 1991. The BPI in the UK certified Roxette for shipments of at least 3 million. They were particularly successful in Germany, where they are recognised as one of the highest-certified acts of all time, with shipments of 5.725 million units.

The duo formed in 1986, releasing debut album Pearls of Passion that same year. The record and its singles performed well in Sweden, but failed to chart elsewhere. Their international breakthrough came with Look Sharp! in 1988, which contained "The Look" and "Listen to Your Heart". Both songs peaked at number one on the Billboard Hot 100, while "Dangerous" peaked at number two. Originally a non-album single in 1987, "It Must Have Been Love" became an international hit when it was re-released in 1990 as part of the soundtrack to Pretty Woman. Their most successful album, Joyride, was issued the following year, eventually selling over 11 million copies worldwide. The title track was their fourth number one on the Billboard Hot 100, with "Fading Like a Flower (Every Time You Leave)" also peaking at number two.

Roxette's fourth studio album Tourism was recorded in multiple studios during the "Join the Joyride! Tour", which saw them performing to over 1.7 million people worldwide. The record performed well internationally, selling six million copies worldwide, but failed to replicate the success of previous albums in North America. 1994's Crash! Boom! Bang! was followed by greatest hits collection Don't Bore Us, Get to the Chorus! in 1995, which both sold in excess of five million copies worldwide. A compilation of Spanish-language re-recordings titled Baladas en Español was issued in Spanish-speaking territories in 1996. Studio albums Have a Nice Day and Room Service were released in 1999 and 2001, respectively, and were both commercially successful throughout Europe.

Fredriksson was diagnosed with a brain tumour in 2002, resulting in a period of inactivity for the duo. They briefly reunited to record two new songs for A Collection of Roxette Hits: Their 20 Greatest Songs! in 2006, before reforming in 2009 and embarking on "The Neverending World Tour". Their studio albums from 1986 to 2001 were re-mastered and re-released in September 2009, featuring previously released bonus tracks. Eighth studio album Charm School came in 2011, with Travelling following a year later. Their tenth and final studio album, Good Karma, was issued in 2016. The band began releasing 30th anniversary editions of their studio albums in 2018, with Look Sharp! followed by Joyride in 2022 and Tourism in 2023. Fredriksson died in 2019 as a result of complications stemming from her 2002 cancer diagnosis. The band released an album of outtakes titled Bag of Trix on the first anniversary of her death; it was released in dedication to her.

== Albums ==
=== Studio albums ===
List of studio albums, with selected chart positions, sales figures and certifications
Title	Album details	Peak chart positions										Certifications
Title	Album details	SWE	AUS	AUT	FIN	GER	NOR	SPA	SWI	UK	US	Certifications
Pearls of Passion	Released: 31 October 1986; Label: EMI; Formats: Cassette · LP · CD	2	—	—	—	—	—	—	—	—	—	GLF: Platinum
Look Sharp!	Released: 21 October 1988; Label: EMI; Formats: Cassette · LP · CD	1	2	3	8	7	1	6	2	4	23	GLF: Platinum; ARIA: 3× Platinum; BPI: Platinum; BVMI: 2× Platinum; IFPI AUT: 2× Platinum; IFPI FIN: Platinum; IFPI SWI: 3× Platinum; Promúsicae: Platinum; RIAA: Platinum
Joyride	Released: 25 March 1991; Label: EMI; Formats: Cassette · CD · LP	1	2	1	1	1	1	6	1	2	12	GLF: 3× Platinum; ARIA: 3× Platinum; BPI: 2× Platinum; BVMI: 7× Gold; IFPI AUT: 3× Platinum; IFPI FIN: 3× Platinum; IFPI SWI: 4× Platinum; Promúsicae: 2× Platinum; RIAA: Platinum
Tourism	Released: 24 August 1992; Label: EMI; Formats: CD · Cassette · LP	1	3	2	1	1	1	5	1	2	117	GLF: 3× Platinum; ARIA: Platinum; BPI: Gold; BVMI: 3× Gold; IFPI AUT: Platinum; IFPI FIN: Gold; IFPI SWI: Platinum; Promúsicae: Platinum
Crash! Boom! Bang!	Released: 11 April 1994; Label: EMI; Formats: CD · LP · Cassette	1	3	3	2	2	6	2	1	3	—	GLF: 2× Platinum; BPI: Gold; BVMI: Platinum; IFPI: Platinum; IFPI AUT: Platinum; IFPI FIN: Platinum; IFPI SWI: Platinum; Promúsicae: Platinum
Have a Nice Day	Released: 17 February 1999; Label: EMI · Roxette Recordings; Formats: CD · Cassette · MiniDisc	1	62	3	8	2	6	2	2	28	—	GLF: Platinum; BVMI: Gold; IFPI AUT: Gold; IFPI FIN: Platinum; IFPI NOR: Platinum; IFPI SWI: Platinum; Promúsicae: Platinum
Room Service	Released: 2 April 2001; Label: EMI · Roxette Recordings; Formats: CD · Cassette	1	—	4	10	3	7	5	2	120	—	GLF: Platinum; BVMI: Gold; IFPI FIN: Gold; IFPI SWI: Gold; Promúsicae: Gold
Charm School	Released: 11 February 2011; Label: Roxette Recordings · Capitol; Formats: CD · LP · digital download	2	49	2	22	1	26	14	1	122	—	GLF: Gold; BVMI: Platinum; IFPI SWI: Gold
Travelling	Released: 23 March 2012; Label: Roxette Recordings · Capitol; Formats: CD · LP · digital download	7	132	15	27	7	36	32	12	143	—	GLF: Gold
Good Karma	Released: 3 June 2016; Label: Roxette Recordings · Parlophone; Formats: CD · LP · digital download	2	25	10	20	11	29	10	2	61	—	
"—" denotes a release that did not chart or was not released in that territory.

== Compilation albums ==
List of compilation albums, with selected chart positions, sales figures and certifications
Title	Album details	Peak chart positions										Certifications
Title	Album details	SWE	AUS	AUT	FIN	GER	NLD	NOR	SPA	SWI	UK	Certifications
Dance Passion: The Remix Album	Released: 27 March 1987; Label: EMI; Formats: LP	19	—	—	—	—	—	—	—	—	—	
Rarities	Released: 17 February 1995; Label: EMI; Formats: CD · Cassette	—	—	—	—	—	—	—	—	—	—	
Don't Bore Us, Get to the Chorus! Roxette's Greatest Hits	Released: 23 October 1995; Label: EMI; Formats: CD · LP · Cassette	2	10	4	2	7	12	14	7	2	5	GLF: 3× Platinum; ARIA: 2× Platinum; BPI: Platinum; BVMI: Platinum; IFPI: Platinum; IFPI AUT: Gold; IFPI FIN: Platinum; Promúsicae: 2× Platinum
Baladas en Español (Note: Baladas en Español consists of re-recorded versions of twelve of their down-tempo singles and album tracks, translated into Spanish. It was only released in Spanish and Portuguese-speaking territories.)	Released: 21 October 1996; Label: EMI; Formats: CD · Cassette	42	—	—	—	—	—	—	8	—	—	Promúsicae: 2× Platinum
The Ballad Hits	Released: 4 November 2002; Label: Roxette Recordings · Capitol; Formats: CD · Cassette	5	—	16	15	10	4	8	20	8	11	GLF: Gold; BPI: 2× Silver; IFPI NOR: Platinum; IFPI SWI: Gold
The Pop Hits	Released: 24 March 2003; Label: Roxette Recordings · Capitol; Formats: CD · Cassette	16	—	32	40	22	27	13	29	27	84	
A Collection of Roxette Hits: Their 20 Greatest Songs!	Released: 18 October 2006; Label: Roxette Recordings · Capitol; Formats: CD · digital download	2	17	8	40	21	48	7	25	7	22	GLF: Gold; BPI: Gold; BVMI: Gold; IFPI SWI: Gold
Greatest Hits (Note: The 2011 Greatest Hits album was only released in the United States, and consists of their eleven English-language singles to appear on the Billboard charts, plus their then-current single "No One Makes It on Her Own".)	Released: 26 July 2011; Label: Capitol; Formats: CD · digital download	—	— (Note: Greatest Hits did not enter the Australian Albums Chart, but peaked at number 9 on the ARIA Digital Albums Chart the week of Fredriksson's death.)	—	—	—	—	—	—	—	—	
Roxette XXX – The 30 Biggest Hits	Released: 11 November 2014; Label: Warner Bros.; Formats: CD · digital download	46	27	49	—	14	95	—	45	11	— (Note: Roxette XXX – The 30 Biggest Hits did not enter the UK Albums Chart, but peaked at number 65 on the Scottish Albums Chart and number 22 on the UK Album Downloads Chart.)	BPI: Gold
Bag of Trix: Music from the Roxette Vaults	Released: 11 December 2020; Label: Roxette Recordings · Parlophone; Formats: 4xLP · 3xCD	2	—	58	—	14	—	—	57	31	—	
ROX RMX (Remixes from the Roxette Vaults)	Released: 20–24 June 2022; Label: Roxette Recordings · Parlophone; Formats: 3× digital album	—	—	—	—	—	—	—	—	—	—	
"—" denotes a release that did not chart or was not released in that territory.

== Box sets ==
List of box sets, with selected chart positions
Title	Album details	Peak chart positions			Notes
Title	Album details	SWE	AUS	SWI	Notes
The Rox Box/Roxette 86–06	Released: 18 October 2006; Label: EMI; Formats: CD · digital download	20	—	—	4-CD box set containing singles, album tracks, b-sides and previously unreleased demos and outtakes.
The Per Gessle Archives (A Lifetime of Songwriting)	Released: 24 September 2014; Label: Elevator Entertainment; Formats: CD · LP · digital download	7	—	—	11-disc box set, containing 4 CDs and 1 vinyl of previously unreleased Roxette demos.
The RoxBox!: A Collection of Roxette's Greatest Songs	Released: 6 February 2015; Label: Parlophone; Formats: CD · digital download	—	12	55	Updated version of The Rox Box, containing tracks from Charm School (2011) and Travelling (2012).
"—" denotes a release that did not chart or was not released in that territory.

== Singles ==
=== 1980s ===
Title	Year	Peak chart positions										Certifications	Album
Title	Year	SWE	AUS	AUT	CAN	FIN	GER	NLD	SWI	UK	US	Certifications	Album
"Neverending Love"	1986	3	—	—	—	—	—	—	—	—	—		Pearls of Passion
"Goodbye to You"	1986	9	—	—	—	—	—	—	—	—	—		Pearls of Passion
"Soul Deep"	1987	18	—	—	—	—	—	—	—	—	—		Pearls of Passion
"I Want You" (with Eva Dahlgren and Ratata)	1987	—	—	—	—	—	—	—	—	—	—		Non-album singles
"It Must Have Been Love (Christmas for the Broken Hearted)"	1987	4	—	—	—	—	—	—	—	—	—		Non-album singles
"I Call Your Name"	1988	—	—	—	—	—	—	—	—	—	—		Pearls of Passion
"Dressed for Success"	1988	2	—	—	—	—	—	—	—	—	—	GLF: Gold	Look Sharp!
"Listen to Your Heart"	1988	3	—	—	—	—	—	—	—	—	—	GLF: Gold	Look Sharp!
"Chances"	1988	—	—	—	—	—	—	—	—	—	—		Look Sharp!
"The Look"	1989	6	1	2	2	1	1	2	1	7	1	GLF: Gold; ARIA: Platinum; BPI: Gold; MC: Gold; RIAA: Gold	Look Sharp!
"Dressed for Success"	1989	—	3	6	10	—	16	—	4	18 (Note: "Dressed for Success" peaked at number 48 in the UK when it was originally released in July 1989. It went on to peak at number 18 when it was re-released there in October 1990.)	14	ARIA: Platinum; MC: Gold	Look Sharp!
"Listen to Your Heart"	1989	—	10	2	1	18	7	5	8	6 (Note: "Listen to Your Heart" was re-issued in the UK in August 1990 as a double A-sided single with "Dangerous". "Listen to Your Heart" peaked at number 62 when it was originally released there in October 1989.)	1	BPI: Platinum; IFPI AUT: Gold	Look Sharp!
"Dangerous"	1989	9	9	8	2	—	8	12	10	6	2	GLF: Gold; ARIA: Gold	Look Sharp!
"—" denotes a release that did not chart or was not released in that territory.

=== 1990s ===
Title	Year	Peak chart positions										Certifications	Album
Title	Year	SWE	AUS	AUT	CAN	FIN	GER	NLD	SWI	UK	US	Certifications	Album
"It Must Have Been Love" (Note: "It Must Have Been Love" was reissued in the UK and Ireland in 1993. The song originally peaked at number 5 in Ireland, while the 1993 re-release peaked at number 10 in both the UK and Ireland.)	1990	6	1	3	1	7	4	2	1	3	1	GLF: Gold; ARIA: Platinum; BPI: Platinum; BVMI: Gold; IFPI AUT: Gold; RIAA: Gold	Pretty Woman: Original Motion Picture Soundtrack
"Joyride"	1991	1	1	1	1	1	1	1	1	4	1	GLF: Platinum; ARIA: Platinum; BPI: Silver; BVMI: Gold; IFPI AUT: Gold; MC: Gold	Joyride
"Fading Like a Flower (Every Time You Leave)"	1991	5	7	6	2	4	5	7	3	12	2	BPI: Silver	Joyride
"The Big L."	1991	10	20	11	—	11	13	15	13	21	—		Joyride
"Spending My Time"	1991	11	16	16	9	18	9	26	15	22	32		Joyride
"Church of Your Heart"	1992	21	55	24	11	—	28	59	—	21	36		Joyride
"How Do You Do!"	1992	2	13	2	12	2	2	2	2	13	58	GLF: Platinum; ARIA: Gold	Tourism
"Queen of Rain"	1992	12	66	—	47	—	19	20	27	28	—		Tourism
"Fingertips '93"	1993	39	—	—	—	—	45	32	—	—	—		Tourism
"Almost Unreal"	1993	8	17	20	29	—	20	31	15	7	94		Super Mario Bros.: Original Motion Picture Soundtrack
"Sleeping in My Car"	1994	1	18	6	2	2	11	19	7	14	50	GLF: Platinum	Crash! Boom! Bang!
"Crash! Boom! Bang!"	1994	17	73	19	27	16	31	23	—	24	—		Crash! Boom! Bang!
"Fireworks"	1994	34	68	18	60	14	51	41	—	30	—		Crash! Boom! Bang!
"Run to You"	1994	—	49	—	—	20	51	—	31	27	—		Crash! Boom! Bang!
"Vulnerable"	1995	12	—	—	—	—	71	—	—	44	—		Crash! Boom! Bang!
"You Don't Understand Me"	1995	9	115	25	— (Note: "You Don't Understand Me" did not enter the Canadian Top Singles Chart, but peaked at number 18 on the Canadian Adult Contemporary Chart.)	7	44	19	—	42	—		Don't Bore Us, Get to the Chorus! Roxette's Greatest Hits
"The Look '95" (remix) (Note: "The Look '95" was only released in the UK.)	1995	—	—	—	—	—	—	—	—	28	—		Non-album single
"June Afternoon"	1996	24	118	—	76	—	57	—	35	52	—		Don't Bore Us, Get to the Chorus! Roxette's Greatest Hits
"She Doesn't Live Here Anymore"	1996	—	—	—	—	—	86	—	—	—	—		Don't Bore Us, Get to the Chorus! Roxette's Greatest Hits
"Wish I Could Fly"	1999	4	57	11	— (Note: "Wish I Could Fly" did not enter the Canadian Top Singles Chart, but peaked at number 65 on the Adult Contemporary Chart.)	9	26	35	12	11	— (Note: "Wish I Could Fly" did not enter the Billboard Hot 100, but peaked at number 27 on the Adult Contemporary Chart.)	GLF: Gold	Have a Nice Day
"Anyone" (Note: In Japan, "Anyone" was released as a double a-side with "Pay the Price".)	1999	35	—	—	—	—	62	73	30	— (Note: "Anyone" was not released as a commercial single in the UK, but peaked at number 42 on the UK airplay chart.)	—		Have a Nice Day
"Stars"	1999	13	—	—	—	9	23	74	28	56	—	GLF: Gold	Have a Nice Day
"Salvation"	1999	46	—	—	—	18	80	—	—	—	—		Have a Nice Day
"—" denotes a release that did not chart or was not released in that territory.

=== 2000s ===
Title	Year	Peak chart positions										Certifications	Album
Title	Year	SWE	AUT	BEL	FIN	GER	ITA	NLD	SPA	SWI	UK	Certifications	Album
"The Centre of the Heart"	2001	1	30	21	13	31	43	74	7	28	—	GLF: Platinum	Room Service
"Real Sugar"	2001	23	—	—	—	96	—	—	12	72	—		Room Service
"Milk and Toast and Honey"	2001	21	—	49	—	54	—	80	29	29	89		Room Service
"A Thing About You"	2002	14	39	39	—	37	35	88	23	35	77		The Ballad Hits
"Opportunity Nox"	2003	11	—	—	—	69	—	—	31	87	—		The Pop Hits
"One Wish"	2006	2	56	—	5	50	—	96	3	56	—		A Collection of Roxette Hits: Their 20 Greatest Songs!
"Reveal"	2007	59	—	—	—	—	—	—	—	—	—		A Collection of Roxette Hits: Their 20 Greatest Songs!
"—" denotes a release that did not chart or was not released in that territory.

=== 2010s ===
Title	Year	Peak chart positions										Album
Title	Year	SWE Airplay	AUT	BEL	GER	POL Airplay	RUS Airplay	SWI	SPA	UK Airplay	US Adult	Album
"She's Got Nothing On (But the Radio)"	2011	10 (Note: "She's Got Nothing On (But the Radio)" also peaked at number 14 on Swedish Digital Songs.)	9	34	10	1	148	19	41	26	30	Charm School
"Speak to Me"	2011	3	—	—	—	3	168	—	—	—	—	Charm School
"Way Out"	2011	—	—	—	—	—	197	—	—	—	—	Charm School
"It's Possible"	2012	10	—	—	64	—	163	—	—	33	—	Travelling
"The Sweet Hello, The Sad Goodbye" (Bassflow remake)	2012	10	—	—	—	—	166	—	—	—	—	Non-album singles
"The Look (2015 Remake)"	2015	— (Note: "The Look (2015 Remake)" did not enter the Swedish Airplay Chart, but peaked at number 38 on Swedish Digital Songs.)	—	—	—	—	—	—	—	—	—	Non-album singles
"It Just Happens"	2016	— (Note: "It Just Happens" did not enter the Swedish Airplay Chart, but peaked at number 8 on Swedish Digital Songs.)	—	—	—	—	184	—	—	—	—	Good Karma
"Some Other Summer"	2016	—	—	—	—	—	—	—	—	—	—	Good Karma
"Why Don't You Bring Me Flowers?"	2016	—	—	—	—	—	—	—	—	—	—	Good Karma
"—" denotes a release that did not chart or was not released in that territory.

=== 2020s ===
Title	Year	Peak chart positions	Album
Title	Year	SWE	Album
"Help! (Abbey Road Sessions November 1995)"	2020	—	Bag of Trix
"Let Your Heart Dance with Me"	2020	—	Bag of Trix
"Tú No Me Comprendes"	2020	—	Bag of Trix
"Piece of Cake"	2020	—	Bag of Trix
"Fading Like a Flower" (with Galantis)	2022	90	ROX RMX Vol. 1 (Remixes from the Roxette Vaults)
"—" denotes a single that has not charted or has yet to be released.

=== Promotional singles ===
Title	Year	Peak chart positions			Album
Title	Year	RUS Airplay	SPA Airplay	US Latin	Album
"Paint" (Note: "Paint" was released on a limited edition promotional single solely in Philippines.)	1989	—	—	—	Look Sharp!
"The Sweet Hello, The Sad Goodbye" (Note: "The Sweet Hello, the Sad Goodbye" was released on a limited edition promotional CD solely in Sweden.)	1991	—	—	—	Non-album single
"Things Will Never Be the Same"	1991	—	—	—	Joyride
"(Do You Get) Excited?"	1992	—	9	—	Joyride
"Come Back (Before You Leave)" (Note: "Come Back (Before You Leave)" was released as a limited edition double A-sided promotional single in Spain, which also contained the Tam Tam Go! track "Piel Sobre Piel".)	1992	—	—	—	Tourism
"Love Is All (Shine Your Light on Me)" (Note: Only 75 copies of the "Love Is All" single were made. These were all sent to executives at EMI branches throughout the world, "as a Christmas gift and also as a sample of what [the Crash! Boom Bang! album] would sound like". Many of the 75 copies were sent to North American branches of EMI, as an attempt to remind staff there that Roxette "still exist.")	1993	—	—	—	Crash! Boom! Bang!
"I'm Sorry"	1995	—	—	—	Crash! Boom! Bang!
"I Don't Want to Get Hurt" (Note: "I Don't Want to Get Hurt" was released as a promotional single in Brazil.)	1995	—	—	—	Don't Bore Us, Get to the Chorus! Roxette's Greatest Hits
"Un Día Sin Ti" ("Spending My Time")	1996	—	20	10	Baladas en Español
"No Sé Si Es Amor" ("It Must Have Been Love")	1997	—	6	—	Baladas en Español
"Soy una Mujer" (Note: "Soy una Mujer" was released as a promotional single exclusively in Mexico.) ("Fading Like a Flower")	1997	—	—	—	Baladas en Español
"I Call Your Name '97" (Note: "I Call Your Name '97" was released as an airplay-only single exclusively in Spain.)	1997	—	25	—	Pearls of Passion – The First Album
"From One Heart to Another" (Note: "From One Heart to Another" was released as a promotional single in Brazil.)	1997	—	—	—	Pearls of Passion – The First Album
"Neverending Love" (Note: "Neverending Love" was reissued as a promotional single by EMI Spain, to commemorate shipments in excess of 50,000 units of the 1997 reissue of Roxette's debut album, Pearls of Passion, in that country.)	1998	—	—	—	Pearls of Passion – The First Album
"Quisiera Volar" (Note: "Quisiera Volar" was released as a promotional single exclusively in Spain.) ("Wish I Could Fly")	1999	—	36	—	Have a Nice Day
"Crush on You" (Note: The album version of "Crush on You" was issued as a promotional single in Sweden, while an exclusive remix of the song by Almighty was issued as a promo single to radio stations in the United Kingdom.)	1999	—	—	—	Have a Nice Day
"Alguien" (Note: "Alguien" was issued as an airplay-only single in Mexico, Spain and Argentina.) ("Anyone")	1999	—	—	—	Have a Nice Day
"No One Makes It on Her Own"	2011	169	—	—	Charm School
"Touched by the Hand of God" (Note: "Touched by the Hand of God" was released as a promotional CD solely in Germany.)	2012	—	—	—	Travelling
"Lover, Lover, Lover" (Note: "Lover, Lover, Lover" was released as a promotional single solely in Germany.)	2012	—	—	—	Travelling
"Small Talk"/"Hotblooded" (T&A demo)	2021	—	—	—	Joyride (30th Anniversary Edition)
"—" denotes a release that did not chart or was not released in that territory.

== Other charted songs ==
Title	Year	Peak chart positions										Certifications	Album
Title	Year	SWE	AUS	FRA	FIN	GER	IRE	NLD	NOR	UK	US	Certifications	Album
"Listen to Your Heart" (DHT & Roxette featuring Edmée)	2004	—	11	7	—	81	12	10	19	7	8	BPI: Silver; RIAA: Gold	Listen to Your Heart
"Fading Like a Flower" (Dancing DJ's vs Roxette)	2005	41	—	—	13	—	13	—	—	18	—		Non-album single
"The Rox Medley"	2006	—	—	—	—	—	—	—	19	—	—		"One Wish"
"—" denotes a release that did not chart or was not released in that territory.

== Videography ==
=== Video albums ===
List of video albums, with selected chart positions and certifications
Title	Album details	Peak chart positions				Sales and certifications
Title	Album details	SWE	AUS	NLD	UK	Sales and certifications
Sweden Live (Note: The Sweden Live video was only released in Japan.)	Released: 17 February 1989; Label: Toshiba EMI; Formats: VHS · LaserDisc	—	—	—	—	
Look Sharp Live	Released: 2 October 1989; Label: Picture Music International; Formats: VHS	—	—	—	—	RIAA: Gold
The Videos	Released: 18 November 1991; Label: Picture Music International; Formats: VHS · LaserDisc	—	—	—	—	BVMI: Gold
Live-Ism	Released: 21 August 1992; Label: Picture Music International; Formats: VHS · LaserDisc	—	—	—	—	
Don't Bore Us, Get to the Chorus! – Roxette's Greatest Video Hits	Released: 20 December 1995; Label: Picture Music International; Formats: VHS · LaserDisc · Video CD	—	—	—	16	
Crash! Boom! Live!	Released: 16 September 1996; Label: Picture Music International; Formats: VHS · LaserDisc	—	—	—	—	
All Videos Ever Made & More! The Complete Collection 1987–2001	Released: 19 November 2001; Label: EMI; Format: DVD	1	—	—	—	
Ballad & Pop Hits – The Complete Video Collection	Released: 17 November 2003; Label: EMI; Format: DVD	—	—	—	—	
Live: Travelling the World	Released: 6 December 2013; Label: Parlophone; Format: DVD	4	10	16	—	
Roxette Diaries: The Private Home Videos 1987–1995	Released: 7 March 2016; Label: Roxette Recordings; Format: DVD	—	—	—	—	
Roxette — Boxette (Note: 4-DVD box set containing Sweden Live, Look Sharp Live, Live-Ism, Crash! Boom! Live! and the previously unreleased Room Service Tour '01 filmed at the Globe Arena in Stockholm on 16 November 2001.)	Released: 5 October 2018; Label: Parlophone; Format: DVD	1	—	5	—	
"—" denotes a release that did not chart or was not released in that territory.

=== Music videos ===
List of music videos, showing year released and directors
Title	Year	Director(s)
"Neverending Love" (version 1)	1987	Lars Lööv
"Neverending Love" (version 2)	1987	Rikard Petrelius
"Soul Deep"	1987	Rikard Petrelius
"I Call Your Name"	1988	Jeroen Kamphoff
"Chances"	1988	Jeroen Kamphoff
"The Look" (version 1)	1988	Mats Jonstam
"The Look" (version 2)	1989	Peter Heath
"Dressed for Success"	1989	Peter Heath
"Listen to Your Heart"	1989	Doug Freel
"Dangerous"	1989	Doug Freel
"Silver Blue"	1989	Doug Freel
"It Must Have Been Love"	1990	Doug Freel
"Joyride"	1991	Doug Freel
"Fading Like a Flower (Every Time You Leave)"	1991	Doug Freel
"The Big L."	1991	Anders Skog
"Spending My Time"	1991	Wayne Isham
"(Do You Get) Excited?"	1992	Wayne Isham
"Church of Your Heart"	1992	Wayne Isham
"How Do You Do!"	1992	Anders Skog
"Queen of Rain"	1992	Matt Murray
"Fingertips '93"	1993	Jonas Åkerlund
"Almost Unreal"	1993	Michael Geoghegan
"Sleeping in My Car"	1994	Michael Geoghegan
"Crash! Boom! Bang!"	1994	Michael Geoghegan
"Fireworks"	1994	Michael Geoghegan
"Run to You"	1994	Jonas Åkerlund
"Vulnerable"	1995	Jonas Åkerlund
"You Don't Understand Me"	1995	Greg Masuak
"June Afternoon"	1995	Jonas Åkerlund
"She Doesn't Live Here Anymore"	1996	Jonas Åkerlund
"Un Día Sin Ti"	1996	Jonas Åkerlund
"Wish I Could Fly"	1999	Jonas Åkerlund
"Anyone"	1999	Jonas Åkerlund
"Stars"	1999	Anton Corbijn
"Salvation"	1999	Anton Corbijn
"The Centre of the Heart"	2001	Jonas Åkerlund
"Real Sugar"	2001	Jesper Hiro
"Milk and Toast and Honey"	2001	Jesper Hiro
"A Thing About You"	2002	Jonas Åkerlund
"Opportunity Nox"	2003	Jonas Åkerlund & Kristoffer Diös
"One Wish"	2006	Jonas Åkerlund
"She's Got Nothing On (But the Radio)"	2011	Mats Udd
"Way Out"	2011	Mikael Sandberg & Magnus Öhrlund
"Speak to Me"	2011	Mikael Sandberg
"No One Makes It on Her Own"	2011	Tanya Rush
"It's Possible"	2012	David Nord & Boris Nawratil
"Some Other Summer" (Sebastien Drums remix)	2015	Sebastien Drums
"It Just Happens"	2016	Tobias Leo Nordquist
"Why Don't You Bring Me Flowers?"	2016	—N/a
"Let Your Heart Dance With Me"	2020	Åsa Nordin-Gessle
"Tú No Me Comprendes"	2020	
"Piece Of Cake"	2020	Åsa Nordin-Gessle
