= Join the Joyride! Tour =

1991–92 concert tour by Roxette

- World tour by Roxette
- Poster to a concert in Stockholm, Sweden
- Associated album: Joyride
- Start date: 4 September 1991
- End date: 22 July 1992
- Legs: 4
- No. of shows: 54 in Europe; 23 in North America; 13 in Latin America; 10 in Oceania; 100 total

Roxette concert chronology
- Look Sharp Live! Tour (1988–89); Join the Joyride! Tour (1991–92); Crash! Boom! Bang! Tour (1994–95)

The "Join the Joyride! World Tour" was the third concert tour by Swedish pop duo Roxette. Their first tour to incorporate dates outside of Europe, it was launched in support of their third studio album, Joyride (1991), and saw the band playing a total of 100 shows throughout Europe, Australia and the Americas. Canadian rock band Glass Tiger supported Roxette on all European dates, while support on the Canadian and US dates was provided by fellow Canadian pop groups World on Edge and West End Girls.

== Reception ==
The tour was originally scheduled to begin in North America, although Per Gessle later explained: "We were supposed to start the tour in America, but then everything got sort of screwed up because of the gulf crisis. So we started in Europe, and then the whole album just exploded [there]. So we kept on doing that forever." Opening instead in September in Helsinki, the tour saw the band playing to over 1.7 million people during its 100 shows in Europe, Australia and North and South America. Tickets for the tour's Swedish dates sold out within a week of release, with the band performing to 104,200 people there over those fifteen dates. The South American leg of the tour was particularly successful. Beginning on 25 March 1992 in Mexico City, the thirteen dates saw the band performing to a total of 347,000 audience members in Mexico, Uruguay, Paraguay, Chile, Argentina and Brazil, with ticket prices across the tour averaging roughly US$20. They played four shows in both Argentina and Brazil, with total ticket sales in those countries exceeding 120,000 and 110,000, respectively. By the end of the tour, sales of Look Sharp! and Joyride in those six territories had risen to almost 1.1 million copies, up 27% from pre-tour sales figures.

The North American leg of the tour received mixed reviews. A review for the Los Angeles Times claimed that Fredriksson was "squandering her talents in pop's low-rent district. She's clearly superior to Roxette's uncomplicated, hook-crammed material"; Jon Pareles of The New York Times criticized their show for its "careful mimicry of MTV. On a set painted in Piet Mondrian primary colors, Miss Fredriksson struts, leans on the other band members, makes symmetrical arm motions, pouts and straps on a guitar to take a few chords; she took off her leather jacket and later her long sleeves, like a G-rated stripper."

== Recordings ==
On 21 August 1992, Roxette released a live video entitled Live-Ism. It contained a shortened version (twelve songs) of their set from their 13 December 1991 performance at the Sydney Entertainment Centre, as well as music videos for "Church of Your Heart", "(Do You Get) Excited?" and then-current single "How Do You Do!". The latter was the first single taken from the duo's fourth studio album, Tourism, which was released a week after the video. Tourism: Songs from Studios, Stages, Hotelrooms, and Other Strange Places was described by Roxette as a "tour album", and consisted of songs recorded by the band in various locations during the "Join the Joyride! Tour", including live versions of "The Look" and "Joyride" taken from the aforementioned Sydney concert, along with live versions of "It Must Have Been Love" from their 25 April 1992 concert in Santiago, Chile and "Things Will Never Be the Same" from a November 1991 concert in Zürich.

== Set list ==
This set list is representative of the tour's opening show on 4 September 1991 in Helsinki, Finland. It does not represent all dates throughout the tour.

1. "Hotblooded"
2. "Dangerous"
3. "Fading Like a Flower (Every Time You Leave)"
4. "Church of Your Heart"
5. "Sleeping Single"
6. "Spending My Time"
7. "Watercolours in the Rain"
8. "Paint"
9. "Knockin' on Every Door"
10. "Dance Away"
11. "The Big L."
12. "Things Will Never Be the Same"
13. "It Must Have Been Love"
14. "Dressed for Success"
15. "Soul Deep"
16. "The Look"
17. "(Do You Get) Excited?"
18. "Joyride"
19. "Listen To Your Heart"
20. "Perfect Day"

=== "Join the Summer Joyride!" Tour ===
This set list is derived from the show on 28 June 1992 at the Brabanthallen in Den Bosch, The Netherlands. It can be considered representative of the entire tour, as the same set was performed on every date.

1. "Hotblooded"
2. "Dangerous"
3. "Fading Like a Flower (Every Time You Leave)"
4. "Church of Your Heart"
5. "Sleeping Single"
6. "Spending My Time"
7. "The Heart Shaped Sea"
8. "Cry"
9. "Knockin' on Every Door"
10. "The Big L."
11. "Things Will Never Be the Same"
12. "It Must Have Been Love"
13. "Dressed for Success"
14. "The Look"
15. "How Do You Do!"
16. "(Do You Get) Excited?"
17. "Joyride"
18. "Perfect Day"
19. "Listen To Your Heart"

== Tour dates ==
List of concerts, showing date, city, country and venue
Join the Joyride! Tour
Date	City	Country	Venue	Opening act
Europe
4 September 1991	Helsinki	Finland	Jäähalli	Glass Tiger
6 September 1991	Norrköping	Sweden	Himmelstalundshallen	Glass Tiger
7 September 1991	Karlskoga	Sweden	Nobelhallen	Glass Tiger
8 September 1991	Skövde	Sweden	Billingehov	Glass Tiger
10 September 1991	Uppsala	Sweden	Metallåtervinning Arena	Glass Tiger
11 September 1991	Borlänge	Sweden	Kupolen	Glass Tiger
13 September 1991	Gävle	Sweden	Gavlerinken Arena	Glass Tiger
14 September 1991	Umeå	Sweden	Ishallen	Glass Tiger
17 September 1991	Halmstad	Sweden	Halmstad Arena	Glass Tiger
18 September 1991	Lund	Sweden	Olympen	Glass Tiger
20 September 1991	Stockholm	Sweden	Globen Arena	Glass Tiger
21 September 1991	Stockholm	Sweden	Globen Arena	Glass Tiger
23 September 1991	Stockholm	Sweden	Globen Arena	Glass Tiger
24 September 1991	Jönköping	Sweden	Jönköping Concert Hall	Glass Tiger
27 September 1991	Oslo	Norway	Oslo Spektrum	Glass Tiger
28 September 1991	Gothenburg	Sweden	Scandinavium	Glass Tiger
29 September 1991	Gothenburg	Sweden	Scandinavium	Glass Tiger
30 September 1991	Copenhagen	Denmark	Falkoner Center	Glass Tiger
4 October 1991	Rotterdam	Netherlands	Rotterdam Ahoy	Glass Tiger
5 October 1991	Hamburg	Germany	Alsterdorfer Sporthalle	Glass Tiger
6 October 1991	Hanover	Germany	Music Hall	Glass Tiger
7 October 1991	Düsseldorf	Germany	Mitsubishi Electric Halle	Glass Tiger
8 October 1991	Munich	Germany	Olympiahalle	Glass Tiger
9 October 1991	Zürich	Switzerland	Hallenstadion	Glass Tiger
11 October 1991	Kiel	Germany	Sparkassen-Arena	Glass Tiger
12 October 1991	Essen	Germany	Grugahalle	Glass Tiger
13 October 1991	Frankfurt	Germany	Festhalle	Glass Tiger
15 October 1991	Brussels	Belgium	Forest National	Glass Tiger
17 October 1991	Birmingham	England	NEC Arena	Glass Tiger
18 October 1991	Edinburgh	Scotland	Ingliston	Glass Tiger
19 October 1991	London	England	Wembley Arena	Glass Tiger
20 October 1991	London	England	Wembley Arena	Glass Tiger
24 October 1991	Linz	Austria	TipsArena	Glass Tiger
25 October 1991	Vienna	Austria	Stadthalle	Glass Tiger
26 October 1991	Innsbruck	Austria	Olympia Eishalle	Glass Tiger
28 October 1991	Berlin	Germany	Deutschlandhalle	Glass Tiger
29 October 1991	Berlin	Germany	Deutschlandhalle	Glass Tiger
1 November 1991	Hanover	Germany	Stadionsporthalle	Glass Tiger
2 November 1991	Mannheim	Germany	Maimarkthalle	Glass Tiger
4 November 1991	Cologne	Germany	Sporthalle	Glass Tiger
5 November 1991	Rotterdam	Netherlands	Rotterdam Ahoy	Glass Tiger
8 November 1991	Madrid	Spain	Raimundo Saporta Pavilion	Glass Tiger
9 November 1991	Barcelona	Spain	Palau dels Esports	Glass Tiger
12 November 1991	Lucerne	Switzerland	Festhalle	Glass Tiger
13 November 1991	Zürich	Switzerland	Hallenstadion	Glass Tiger
14 November 1991	Zürich	Switzerland	Hallenstadion	Glass Tiger
16 November 1991	Dortmund	Germany	Westfalenhallen	Glass Tiger
Australia
25 November 1991	Perth	Australia	Perth Entertainment Centre	
26 November 1991	Perth	Australia	Perth Entertainment Centre	
29 November 1991	Adelaide	Australia	Adelaide Entertainment Centre	
3 December 1991	Melbourne	Australia	National Tennis Centre	
4 December 1991	Melbourne	Australia	National Tennis Centre	
7 December 1991	Sydney	Australia	Sydney Entertainment Centre	
8 December 1991	Sydney	Australia	Sydney Entertainment Centre	
9 December 1991	Sydney	Australia	Sydney Entertainment Centre	
11 December 1991	Brisbane	Australia	Brisbane Entertainment Centre	
13 December 1991	Sydney	Australia	Sydney Entertainment Centre	
North America
14 February 1992	Vancouver	Canada	Pacific Coliseum	World on Edge
15 February 1992	Seattle	United States	Paramount Theatre	World on Edge
17 February 1992	Calgary	Canada	Olympic Saddledome	World on Edge
18 February 1992	Edmonton	Canada	Northlands Coliseum	World on Edge
20 February 1992	Saskatoon	Canada	SaskTel Centre	World on Edge
22 February 1992	Winnipeg	Canada	Winnipeg Arena	World on Edge
23 February 1992	Minneapolis	United States	Orpheum Theatre	West End Girls
25 February 1992	Chicago	United States	Riviera Theatre	West End Girls
26 February 1992	St. Louis	United States	Fox Theatre	West End Girls
28 February 1992	Detroit	United States	Fox Theatre	West End Girls
29 February 1992	Pittsburgh	United States	Sewall Center	West End Girls
1 March 1992	Fairfax	United States	Patriot Center	West End Girls
3 March 1992	Toronto	Canada	Maple Leaf Gardens	West End Girls
4 March 1992	Montreal	Canada	Montreal Forum	West End Girls
5 March 1992	New York City	United States	Beacon Theatre	West End Girls
7 March 1992	Boston	United States	Orpheum Theatre	West End Girls
8 March 1992	Upper Darby Township	United States	Tower Theater	West End Girls
10 March 1992	Atlanta	United States	Fox Theatre	West End Girls
13 March 1992	Arlington	United States	Six Flags Over Texas	West End Girls
15 March 1992	Mesa	United States	Mesa Amphitheatre	West End Girls
17 March 1992	San Diego	United States	Spreckels Theater	West End Girls
18 March 1992	San Francisco	United States	The Warfield	West End Girls
20 March 1992	Los Angeles	United States	Universal Amphitheatre	West End Girls
Latin America
25 March 1992	Mexico City	Mexico	National Auditorium	
26 March 1992	Mexico City	Mexico	National Auditorium	
21 April 1992	Montevideo	Uruguay	Estadio Centenario	Monalisa
23 April 1992	Asunción	Paraguay	Estadio Defensores del Chaco	
25 April 1992	Santiago	Chile	Estadio San Carlos de Apoquindo	
28 April 1992	Tucumán	Argentina	Estadio La Ciudadela	
30 April 1992	Córdoba	Argentina	Estadio Chateau Carreras	
2 May 1992	Buenos Aires	Argentina	José Amalfitani Stadium	
3 May 1992	Buenos Aires	Argentina	José Amalfitani Stadium	
6 May 1992	Porto Alegre	Brazil	Gigantinho	
9 May 1992	Rio de Janeiro	Brazil	Praça da Apoteose	
12 May 1992	Belo Horizonte	Brazil	Shopping Del Rey	
15 May 1992	São Paulo	Brazil	Sambódromo do Anhembi	
Join the Summer Joyride! Tour
Europe
25 June 1992	London	England	Wembley Arena	Clouseau
27 June 1992	Brussels	Belgium	Forest National	Clouseau
28 June 1992	's-Hertogenbosch	Netherlands	Brabanthallen	Clouseau
29 June 1992	Paris	France	Le Zénith	Clouseau
1 July 1992	Berlin	Germany	Waldbühne	Clouseau
3 July 1992	Stuttgart	Germany	Hanns-Martin-Schleyer-Halle	Clouseau
4 July 1992	Bielefeld	Germany	Bielefelder Alm	Clouseau
5 July 1992	Ringe	Denmark	Midtfyns Festival	Clouseau
8 July 1992	Budapest	Hungary	Kisstadion	Clouseau
9 July 1992	Vienna	Austria	Neusedlersee	Clouseau
11 July 1992	Zürich	Switzerland	Hardturm Stadium	Clouseau
12 July 1992	Salzburg	Austria	Residenzplatz	Clouseau
15 July 1992	Dortmund	Germany	Westfalenhallen	Clouseau
17 July 1992	Sheffield	England	Sheffield Arena	Clouseau
18 July 1992	Glasgow	Scotland	SECC	Clouseau
22 July 1992	Stockholm	Sweden	Sjöhistoriska Museet	Clouseau

== Cancelled shows ==
List of cancelled concerts, showing date, city, country, venue and reason for cancellation
Join the Joyride! Tour
Date	City	Country	Venue	Reason
2 October 1991	Århus	Denmark	—N/a	—N/a
21 October 1991	Paris	France	—N/a	—N/a
22 October 1991	Mulhouse	France	—N/a	—N/a
29 October 1991	Warsaw	Poland	—N/a	Political uncertainty. Most of these dates were rescheduled to venues in Germany and the Netherlands
31 October 1991	Katowice	Poland	—N/a	Political uncertainty. Most of these dates were rescheduled to venues in Germany and the Netherlands
1 November 1991	Prague	Czechoslovakia/Czech Republic	—N/a	Political uncertainty. Most of these dates were rescheduled to venues in Germany and the Netherlands
3 November 1991	Budapest	Hungary	—N/a	Political uncertainty. Most of these dates were rescheduled to venues in Germany and the Netherlands
4 November 1991	Zagreb	Yugoslavia/Croatia	—N/a	Political uncertainty. Most of these dates were rescheduled to venues in Germany and the Netherlands
5 November 1991	Ljubljana	Yugoslavia/Slovenia	—N/a	Political uncertainty. Most of these dates were rescheduled to venues in Germany and the Netherlands
8 March 1992	Philadelphia	United States	—N/a	Moved to Upper Darby
11 March 1992	Memphis	United States	—N/a	Undisclosed illness
12 March 1992	Houston	United States	The Back Alley	Undisclosed illness
21 March 1992	Los Angeles	United States	Universal Amphitheatre	Low ticket sales. Sales were merged with March 20 date.
Join the Summer Joyride! Tour
9 July 1992	Podersdorf	Austria	Podersdorf Strandbad	Moved to Vienna
25 July 1992	Gothenburg	Sweden	—N/a	Marie Fredriksson diagnosed with Laryngitis

== Lineup ==
- Marie Fredriksson — vocals, backing vocals, electric guitar, piano
- Per Gessle — vocals, backing vocals, rhythm guitar
- Per "Pelle" Alsing — drums, percussion
- Vicki Benckert — backing vocals, accordion, mandolin, acoustic and electric guitar
- Anders Herrlin — bass
- Jonas Isacsson — electric guitar
- Clarence Öfwerman — keyboards
- Staffan Öfwerman — backing vocals, keyboards, percussion
