= The Rox Box/Roxette 86–06 =

The Rox Box (Roxette 86–06)

Box set by Roxette
- Released: 18 October 2006
- Recorded: March 1986 – June 2006
- Genre: Pop rock
- Length: 308:51 (music); 240:12 (video); 549:03 (total)
- Label: Roxette Recordings; Capitol
- Producer: Clarence Öfwerman; Per Gessle; Marie Fredriksson; Michael Ilbert; Mikael Bolyos; Christoffer Lundquist

Roxette chronology
A Collection of Roxette Hits: Their 20 Greatest Songs! (2006)	The Rox Box (Roxette 86–06) (2006)	Charm School (2011)

The Rox Box (Roxette 86–06) is a boxed set compilation by Swedish pop duo Roxette, released on 18 October 2006 by Roxette Recordings and Capitol. It is an expanded companion piece to the single-disc greatest hits album A Collection of Roxette Hits: Their 20 Greatest Songs!, which was also released on the same date. The box set consists of four CDs (HDCD) containing singles, album tracks, non-album singles and B-sides, as well as previously unreleased outtakes, alternate versions and demos. It also includes two DVDs: the first is of their previously unreleased 9 January 1993 performance at the Cirkus arena in Stockholm for MTV Unplugged; the second contains every music video ever recorded by the duo. In fact, it is a Dual layer (both sided) DVD.

== Contents ==
The box set was created to celebrate twenty years since the release of Roxette's debut studio album Pearls of Passion (1986). Its spine contains the words "It was twenty years ago today...", a reference to The Beatles song "Sgt. Pepper's Lonely Hearts Club Band". In an interview on Vancouver Island's CKWV-FM ("The Wave"), Per Gessle described the box as "four CDs, some DVDs, a little bit of this, a little bit of that, outtakes and demos and stuff. It's like a coffee table thing, and it's really, really big, [with an] 80-page booklet and stuff." Its contents were compiled by Gessle, Marie Fredriksson and Kjell Andersson—a Swedish music producer and longtime executive at EMI Sweden, which was the duo's original label. The songs featured on the box set stretch back to Roxette's first single, "Neverending Love", to new songs recorded in June 2006 specifically for the compilation, "One Wish" and "Reveal". These songs were the first new tracks recorded by the duo following Fredriksson's brain tumour diagnosis in 2002.

The set omits four singles: "I Call Your Name" from Pearls of Passion, "Chances" from Look Sharp! (1988), and the single version of "Fingertips '93" (originally from 1992's Tourism), all of which received a limited release in select European territories. The only internationally-released single to be omitted from the box set is "Fireworks", from Crash! Boom! Bang! (1994). The song has never appeared on any of the duo's compilation albums. In an interview with The Daily Roxette in 2009, Gessle was asked why the song has been ignored, replying: "I guess it just wasn't big enough. There are so many other [Roxette] tracks that kick its ass. And on The Rox Box, we decided to use demos and other uplifting stuff instead." One of the DVDs, however, does include the music videos to all of these songs. The other DVD contains the duo's complete set from their 1993 MTV Unplugged concert, which had remained unreleased until this point, although three songs from the show appeared on their 1995 compilation Rarities: "Joyride", "The Look" and "Dangerous".

== Critical reception ==
Professional ratings
Review scores
Source	Rating
Aftonbladet	3/5 stars

Markus Larsson of Swedish publication Aftonbladet was critical of the box set's length, but praised the duo's songwriting and vocal performances, particularly on the first two CDs, writing: "Even Satan knows the melodies Per Gessle wrote during Roxette's peak, they were the most irresistible blend of hooks and power-pop. And let's not forget Miss Marie's delectable vocals, which illuminated every single hit. Together, they were the bastard lovechild of ABBA and Ramones. It's no wonder sales figures were so breathtaking."

== Track listing ==
All songs written by Per Gessle and produced by Clarence Öfwerman, except where noted.

The RoxBox/Roxette 86–06 – CD1
No.	Title	Writer(s)	Producer(s)	Length
1.	"Neverending Love" (from Pearls of Passion, 1986)			3:27
2.	"Secrets That She Keeps" (from Pearls of Passion)			3:41
3.	"Goodbye to You" (from Pearls of Passion)			4:00
4.	"Soul Deep" (from Pearls of Passion)			3:33
5.	"The Look" (from Look Sharp!, 1988)			3:57
6.	"Dressed for Success" (US Single Mix) (from Look Sharp!)			4:12
7.	"Sleeping Single" (from Look Sharp!)			4:38
8.	"Paint" (from Look Sharp!)			3:32
9.	"Dangerous" (Single Version) (from Look Sharp!)			3:51
10.	"Listen to Your Heart" (Swedish Single Edit) (from Look Sharp!)	Gessle; Mats "MP" Persson		5:15
11.	"The Voice" (Look Sharp! outtake)			4:16
12.	"Cry" (Demo) (previously unreleased)	Marie Fredriksson; Gessle	Fredriksson; Gessle	5:09
13.	"It Must Have Been Love" (from the Pretty Woman soundtrack, 1990)			4:19
14.	"Joyride" (Radio Edit) (from Joyride, 1991)			4:01
15.	"Fading Like a Flower (Every Time You Leave)" (from Joyride)			3:53
16.	"Spending My Time" (from Joyride)	Gessle; Persson		4:36
17.	"Watercolours in the Rain" (from Joyride)	Fredriksson; Gessle		3:39
18.	"Church of Your Heart" (from Joyride)			3:23
19.	"Perfect Day" (from Joyride)	Gessle; Persson		4:06
Total length:				77:28

The RoxBox/Roxette 86–06 – CD2
No.	Title	Writer(s)	Producer(s)	Length
1.	"The Big L." (from Joyride)			4:28
2.	"(Do You Get) Excited?" (from Joyride)	Gessle; Persson		4:17
3.	"Things Will Never Be the Same" (from Joyride)			4:28
4.	"The Sweet Hello, The Sad Goodbye" (Joyride outtake)			3:48
5.	"Love Spins" (Demo) (previously unreleased)		Gessle	3:31
6.	"Seduce Me" (Demo)	Fredriksson; Gessle	Fredriksson; Gessle	3:56
7.	"How Do You Do!" (from Tourism, 1992)			3:11
8.	"The Heart Shaped Sea" (from Tourism)			4:32
9.	"The Rain" (from Tourism)			4:50
10.	"Never Is a Long Time" (from Tourism)			3:46
11.	"Silver Blue" (from Tourism)			4:08
12.	"Come Back (Before You Leave)" (from Tourism)			4:32
13.	"Queen of Rain" (from Tourism)	Gessle; Persson		4:56
14.	"Almost Unreal" (from the Super Mario Bros. soundtrack, 1993)			3:58
15.	"Sleeping in My Car" (Single Edit) (from Crash! Boom! Bang!, 1994)			3:34
16.	"Crash! Boom! Bang!" (Single Edit) (from Crash! Boom! Bang!)			4:28
17.	"Vulnerable" (Single Edit) (from Crash! Boom! Bang!)			4:29
18.	"The First Girl on the Moon" (from Crash! Boom! Bang!)			2:57
19.	"I'm Sorry" (from Crash! Boom! Bang!)			3:11
Total length:				77:00

The RoxBox/Roxette 86–06 – CD3
No.	Title	Writer(s)	Producer(s)	Length
1.	"Run to You" (from Crash! Boom! Bang!)			3:38
2.	"See Me" (Crash! Boom! Bang! outtake)	Fredriksson; Gessle		3:45
3.	"June Afternoon" (from Don't Bore Us, Get to the Chorus!, 1995)			4:11
4.	"You Don't Understand Me" (from Don't Bore Us, Get to the Chorus!)	Desmond Child; Gessle		4:27
5.	"She Doesn't Live Here Anymore" (from Don't Bore Us, Get to the Chorus!)	Gessle; Persson	Gessle; Michael Ilbert	4:04
6.	"I Don't Want to Get Hurt" (from Don't Bore Us, Get to the Chorus!)			4:17
7.	"Always Breaking My Heart" (Demo)		Gessle	3:07
8.	"Help!" (Live from Abbey Road) (previously unreleased)	Lennon–McCartney		2:57
9.	"Wish I Could Fly" (from Have a Nice Day, 1999)		Fredriksson; Gessle; Ilbert; Öfwerman	4:42
10.	"You Can't Put Your Arms Around What's Already Gone" (from Have a Nice Day)		Fredriksson; Gessle; Ilbert; Öfwerman	3:33
11.	"Waiting for the Rain" (from Have a Nice Day)	Fredriksson	Fredriksson; Gessle; Ilbert; Öfwerman	3:38
12.	"Anyone" (from Have a Nice Day)		Fredriksson; Gessle; Ilbert; Öfwerman	4:32
13.	"Stars" (from Have a Nice Day)		Fredriksson; Gessle; Ilbert; Öfwerman	3:57
14.	"Salvation" (from Have a Nice Day)		Fredriksson; Gessle; Ilbert; Öfwerman	4:38
15.	"Cooper" (from Have a Nice Day)		Fredriksson; Gessle; Ilbert; Öfwerman	4:20
16.	"Beautiful Things" (from Have a Nice Day)	Fredriksson; Gessle	Fredriksson; Gessle; Ilbert; Öfwerman	3:50
17.	"It Hurts" (Have a Nice Day outtake)		Fredriksson; Gessle; Ilbert; Öfwerman	3:52
18.	"Little Miss Sorrow" (Have a Nice Day outtake)		Fredriksson; Gessle; Ilbert; Öfwerman	3:57
19.	"Happy Together" (Have a Nice Day outtake)		Gessle	3:56
20.	"Staring at the Ground" (Demo) (previously unreleased)		Gessle	3:50
Total length:				79:11

The RoxBox/Roxette 86–06 – CD4
No.	Title	Writer(s)	Producer(s)	Length
1.	"7Twenty7" (Demo)		Gessle	3:27
2.	"It Will Take a Long Long Time" (Modern Rock Version)		Fredriksson; Gessle; Ilbert; Öfwerman	3:59
3.	"Anyone/I Love How You Love Me" (Demo) (previously unreleased)	Gessle; Larry Kobler; Barry Mann	Gessle	4:12
4.	"Myth" (previously unreleased)	Fredriksson; Gessle	Fredriksson; Mikael Bolyos; Persson	4:25
5.	"New World" (previously unreleased)	Fredriksson	Bolyos	4:38
6.	"Better Off on Her Own" (Demo) (previously unreleased)		Gessle	2:51
7.	"Real Sugar" (from Room Service, 2001)		Fredriksson; Gessle; Öfwerman	3:17
8.	"The Centre of the Heart" (from Room Service)		Fredriksson; Gessle; Öfwerman; Ilbert^{[a]}	3:23
9.	"Milk and Toast and Honey" (from Room Service)		Fredriksson; Gessle; Öfwerman	4:04
10.	"Jefferson" (from Room Service)		Fredriksson; Gessle; Öfwerman	3:58
11.	"Little Girl" (from Room Service)	Fredriksson	Fredriksson; Gessle; Öfwerman	3:39
12.	"The Weight of the World" (Room Service outtake)		Fredriksson; Gessle; Öfwerman	2:52
13.	"Every Day" (Room Service outtake)	Fredriksson; Gessle	Fredriksson; Gessle; Öfwerman	3:25
14.	"Bla Bla Bla Bla Bla (You Broke My Heart)" (Demo) (previously unreleased)		Gessle	4:36
15.	"A Thing About You" (from The Ballad Hits, 2002)		Gessle; Öfwerman	3:49
16.	"Breathe" (from The Ballad Hits)		Gessle; Öfwerman	4:34
17.	"Opportunity Nox" (from The Pop Hits, 2003)		Fredriksson; Gessle; Öfwerman	3:01
18.	"All I Ever Wanted" (The Change outtake) (previously unreleased)	Fredriksson	Bolyos	4:16
19.	"One Wish" (previously unreleased)		Gessle; Öfwerman; Christoffer Lundquist	3:03
20.	"Reveal" (previously unreleased)		Gessle; Öfwerman; Lundquist	3:43
Total length:				75:12

DVD1: The Complete Roxette MTV Unplugged TV Show!
No.	Title	Writer(s)	Producer(s)	Length
1.	"Intro"			0:18
2.	"The Look"		Fredriksson; Gessle; Öfwerman	4:59
3.	"Queen of Rain"	Gessle; Persson	Fredriksson; Gessle; Öfwerman	5:45
4.	"Hotblooded"	Fredriksson; Gessle	Fredriksson; Gessle; Öfwerman	3:51
5.	"Interlude"			0:32
6.	"I Never Loved a Man (The Way I Love You)"	Ronnie Shannon	Fredriksson; Gessle; Öfwerman	4:41
7.	"It Must Have Been Love"		Fredriksson; Gessle; Öfwerman	5:08
8.	"Fingertips"		Fredriksson; Gessle; Öfwerman	3:30
9.	"Interlude"			0:28
10.	"Heart of Gold"	Neil Young	Fredriksson; Gessle; Öfwerman	4:00
11.	"Church of Your Heart"		Fredriksson; Gessle; Öfwerman	3:00
12.	"Listen to Your Heart"	Gessle; Persson	Fredriksson; Gessle; Öfwerman	3:49
13.	"Interlude"			0:25
14.	"Here Comes the Weekend"		Fredriksson; Gessle; Öfwerman	4:05
15.	"Joyride"		Fredriksson; Gessle; Öfwerman	5:53
16.	"So You Want to Be a Rock 'n' Roll Star"	Jim McGuinn; Chris Hillman	Fredriksson; Gessle; Öfwerman	2:47
17.	"Dangerous"		Fredriksson; Gessle; Öfwerman	4:46
18.	"Spending My Time"	Gessle; Persson	Fredriksson; Gessle; Öfwerman	4:48
19.	"The Heart Shaped Sea"		Fredriksson; Gessle; Öfwerman	4:25
20.	"Cry"	Fredriksson; Gessle	Fredriksson; Gessle; Öfwerman	2:33
21.	"Watercolours in the Rain"	Fredriksson; Gessle	Fredriksson; Gessle; Öfwerman	4:08
22.	"Surrender"		Fredriksson; Gessle; Öfwerman	3:25
23.	"Fading Like a Flower (Every Time You Leave)"		Fredriksson; Gessle; Öfwerman	3:44
24.	"Perfect Day"	Gessle; Persson	Fredriksson; Gessle; Öfwerman	4:21
25.	"Credits"			0:53
Total length:				1:26:14

DVD2: All the Roxette Videos!
No.	Title	Director	Length
1.	"Neverending Love"	Rikard Petrelius	3:33
2.	"Soul Deep"	Rikard Petrelius	3:52
3.	"I Call Your Name"	Jeroen Kamphoff	3:20
4.	"Chances"	Jeroen Kamphoff	4:05
5.	"The Look"	Peter Heath	3:55
6.	"Dressed for Success"	Peter Heath	4:09
7.	"Listen to Your Heart"	Doug Freel	5:04
8.	"Dangerous"	Doug Freel	3:54
9.	"It Must Have Been Love"	Doug Freel	4:18
10.	"Joyride"	Doug Freel	4:38
11.	"Fading Like a Flower (Every Time You Leave)"	Doug Freel	3:56
12.	"Spending My Time"	Wayne Isham	4:45
13.	"Church of Your Heart"	Wayne Isham	3:25
14.	"(Do You Get) Excited?"	Wayne Isham	4:18
15.	"The Big L."	Anders Skog	4:29
16.	"How Do You Do!"	Anders Skog	3:14
17.	"Queen of Rain"	Matt Murray	5:00
18.	"Almost Unreal"	Michael Geoghegan	4:18
19.	"Fingertips '93"	Jonas Åkerlund	3:45
20.	"Fireworks"	Michael Geoghegan	3:38
21.	"Sleeping in My Car"	Michael Geoghegan	3:45
22.	"Crash! Boom! Bang!"	Michael Geoghegan	4:53
23.	"Run to You"	Jonas Åkerlund	3:40
24.	"Vulnerable"	Jonas Åkerlund	4:28
25.	"June Afternoon"	Jonas Åkerlund	4:15
26.	"You Don't Understand Me"	Greg Masuak	4:30
27.	"She Doesn't Live Here Anymore"	Jonas Åkerlund	4:04
28.	"Un Día Sin Ti"	Jonas Åkerlund	4:39
29.	"Wish I Could Fly"	Jonas Åkerlund	4:40
30.	"Stars"	Anton Corbijn	3:58
31.	"Salvation"	Anton Corbijn	4:15
32.	"Anyone"	Jonas Åkerlund	4:54
33.	"Real Sugar"	Jesper Hiro (creative director: Jonas Åkerlund)	3:54
34.	"The Centre of the Heart"	Jonas Åkerlund	3:27
35.	"Milk and Toast and Honey"	Jesper Hiro	4:12
36.	"A Thing About You"	Jonas Åkerlund	3:43
37.	"Opportunity Nox"	Kristoffer Diös	3:07
Total length:			2:33:58

Notes

- ^{^[a]} signifies a co-producer.

== Charts ==
Chart (2006)	Peak position
Swedish Albums (Sverigetopplistan)	20
Australian Albums (ARIA)	12
