= Sweden Live =

Video by Roxette
- Released: 17 February 1989
- Recorded: Himmelstalundshallen, Sweden on 13 December 1988
- Genre: Rock
- Length: 60 minutes (approximate)
- Language: English; Swedish
- Label: Toshiba EMI

Roxette chronology
Sweden Live (1989)	Look Sharp Live (1989)

Sweden Live is the first concert film by Swedish pop music duo Roxette, released on 17 February 1989 on VHS and LaserDisc formats by Toshiba EMI exclusively in Japan. It features a shortened version of a concert filmed at Himmelstalundshallen in Norrköping, Sweden on 16 December 1988.

== Formats and track listings ==
All songs written by Per Gessle, except "Cry" and "Dance Away" by Marie Fredriksson and Gessle, and "Joy of a Toy" and "Listen to Your Heart" by Gessle and Mats Persson.

- Japan (VHS: TOVW-3031 · LaserDisc: TOLW-3031)
1. "Dressed for Success"
2. "The Look"
3. "Cry"
4. "Joy of a Toy"
5. "Surrender"
6. "Neverending Love"
7. "Dance Away"
8. "Dangerous"
9. "Soul Deep"
10. "Listen to Your Heart"
