= Dance Passion =

Remix album by Roxette
- Released: 27 March 1987
- Genre: Dance
- Length: 37:50
- Label: EMI

Roxette chronology
Pearls of Passion (1986)	Dance Passion (1987)	Look Sharp! (1988)

Dance Passion is a remix album by Swedish pop music duo Roxette, released on 27 March 1987 by EMI. It consists of remixed versions of tracks from their debut album, Pearls of Passion (1986). The album was only released on vinyl in select European territories, namely Sweden, Germany and Italy. It failed to chart in the latter countries, and sold just 27,000 copies in Sweden, peaking at number 19 and spending four weeks on the Swedish Albums Chart. It has never been reissued or pressed onto cassette or CD.

Songs on the record were predominantly remixed by Swedish producer and engineer Kaj Erixon, with the exception of René Hedemyr's remix of "Neverending Love", and the version of "Secrets That She Keeps", which was created by longtime Roxette engineer Alar Suurna. Two of these remixes had previously been issued on their respective singles: the aforementioned remix of "Neverending Love" appeared under the names "Extended Club Mix" or "Euro Mix" on the 12" single released in France; the remix of "Soul Deep" also featured on that song's 12" single, under the title "Extended Mix". All other remixes are exclusive to this release.

== Track listing ==
All lyrics are written by Per Gessle; all music is composed by Gessle, except "Joy of a Toy" by Gessle and Mats "MP" Persson

Side A:
No.	Title	Remixer	Length
1.	"I Call Your Name"	Kaj Erixon	5:13
2.	"Soul Deep"	Kaj Erixon	5:17
3.	"Like Lovers Do"	Kaj Erixon	5:05
4.	"Neverending Love"	René Hedemyr	4:31
Total length:			20:16

Side B:
No.	Title	Remixer	Length
5.	"Goodbye to You"	Kaj Erixon	6:00
6.	"Secrets That She Keeps"	Alar Suurna	6:16
7.	"Joy of a Toy"	Kaj Erixon	5:18
Total length:			17:34

== Personnel ==
Credits adapted from the liner notes of Dance Passion.

- Roxette are Per Gessle and Marie Fredriksson
- Originally produced by Clarence Öfwerman at EMI Studios, Stockholm, Sweden
- Remixed by René Hedemyr ("Neverending Love"), Alar Suurna ("Secrets That She Keeps") and Kaj Erixon
- Additional overdubbing by Kent Gillström at The Hit Factory, New York City
- Mastered by Peter Dahl at Polar Studios, Stockholm, Sweden
- All songs published by Jimmy Fun Music, except "Soul Deep" by Happy Accident Music

Musicians

- Vocals — Marie Fredriksson and Per Gessle
- Backing vocals — Marianne Flynner and Anne-Lie Rydé
- Bass guitar — Tommy Cassemar
- Drums — Per "Pelle" Alsing, Per Andersson and Tim Werner
- Electric guitars — Staffan Astner, Jonas Isacsson and Mats "MP" Persson
- Keyboards — Clarence Öfwerman
- Percussion — Mats "MP" Persson
- Trumpet — Uno Forsberg, Mikael Renlinden and Tomas Sjörgen (on "Soul Deep")

== Charts ==
Chart (1987)	Peak position
Swedish Albums (Sverigetopplistan)	19
