= Look Sharp Live =

Video by Roxette
- Released: 2 October 1989
- Recorded: Borgholm Castle, Sweden on 25–26 July 1989
- Genre: Rock
- Length: 45 minutes (approximate)
- Language: English
- Label: EMI; Picture Music International
- Director: Doug Freel
- Producer: Andy Picheta

Roxette chronology
Sweden Live (1989)	Look Sharp Live (1989)	The Videos (1991)

Look Sharp Live is the second concert film by Swedish pop music duo Roxette, released on 2 October 1989 on VHS format by EMI and Picture Music International. The footage consists of two edited concerts filmed on the Borgholm Castle ruin on the Swedish Baltic Sea island of Öland on 25–26 July 1989. The film was directed Doug Freel with a predominantly American production crew, who believed the ruin had been created especially for the film. Gessle later said in the liner notes of Don't Bore Us, Get to the Chorus! Roxette's Greatest Hits (1995): "It took some time to convince them that the place actually was for real."

The project had a considerable budget, with the production crew hiring two helicopters from the Swedish Air Force to film aerial shots. Footage from this film was used to create two music videos: "Listen to Your Heart" and "Dangerous". Included as an unlisted track on all editions of the film is a remix of "The Look", which mixes the song with footage from two preexisting music videos directed by Peter Heath: "The Look" and "Dressed for Success".

== Formats and track listings ==
All songs written by Per Gessle, except "Dance Away" and "Cry" by Marie Fredriksson and Gessle, and "Listen to Your Heart" by Gessle and Mats Persson.

- VHS (Europe MVP-9912073 · US ES-1610)
1. "The Look"
2. "Dressed for Success"
3. "Dance Away"
4. "Dangerous"
5. "Cry"
6. "Paint"
7. "Silver Blue"
8. "Listen to Your Heart"
9. "The Look" (Visible Mix)

== Certifications ==
Region	Certification	Certified units/sales
United States (RIAA)	Gold	50,000^{^}
^{^} Shipments figures based on certification alone.
