= Church of Your Heart =

1992 single by Roxette

Single by Roxette

from the album Joyride
- B-side: "I Call Your Name"
- Released: 24 February 1992
- Recorded: 1990
- Studio: EMI (Stockholm, Sweden)
- Length: 3:16
- Label: EMI
- Songwriter: Per Gessle
- Producer: Clarence Öfwerman

Roxette singles chronology
"Spending My Time" (1991)	"Church of Your Heart" (1992)	"How Do You Do!" (1992)

Music video
- "Church of Your Heart" on YouTube

"Church of Your Heart" is a song by Swedish pop duo Roxette, released in February 1992 by EMI Records as the fifth and final single from their third studio album, Joyride (1991). Written by Per Gessle and produced by Clarence Öfwerman, the song was a top-20 hit in Canada, where it peaked at number 11, and charted throughout Europe, entering the top 40 in several countries. "I Call Your Name" – originally released as a single from their 1986 debut album Pearls of Passion – appeared as the B-side. On UK editions of the single, the song was backed by an exclusive megamix consisting of a medley of "It Must Have Been Love", "Listen to Your Heart", "The Look", "Joyride" and "Fading Like a Flower (Every Time You Leave)".

== Critical reception ==
AllMusic editor Bryan Buss described the song as "folky" in his review of Joyride. Jim Farber from Entertainment Weekly wrote that Roxette adds some "Dylanesque harmonica" into "Church of Your Heart". Swedish Expressen said that the song "is the closest we come to Gyllene Tider". Gavin Report commented, "A rare lead vocal from Per gives the Roxette sound a different texture but the result is the same—a hit." I Dag stated that it "is Gessle from his best side. This could be Gyllene Tider 1991."

== Music video ==
The music video for "Church of Your Heart" was filmed at a church in Sydney, Australia. It was directed by American director Wayne Isham, who also directed the video for previous single "Spending My Time", as well as one for another song from Joyride—"(Do You Get) Excited?", which was due to be released as the album's sixth single. Its planned single release was later cancelled, however.

== Formats and track listings ==
- Cassette and 7-inch single (Europe 1364577 · US 4KM-50380)
1. "Church of Your Heart" – 3:16
2. "I Call Your Name" – 3:37
- UK Cassette and 7-inch single (UKEM227)
1. "Church of Your Heart" – 3:16
2. "Megamix" – 9:04
- CD single (Europe 1364572)
1. "Church of Your Heart" – 3:18
2. "I Call Your Name" – 3:37
3. "Come Back (Before You Leave)" (Demo, April 1990) – 4:11
4. "Soul Deep" (Tom Lord-Alge Remix) – 3:40
- UK CD1 (UKCDEM227)
1. "Church of Your Heart" – 3:18
2. "I Call Your Name" – 3:37
3. "Come Back (Before You Leave)" (Demo) – 4:11
4. "Fading Like a Flower (Every Time You Leave)" – 3:51
- UK CD2 (UKCDEMS227)
1. "Church of Your Heart" – 3:18
2. "I Call Your Name" – 3:37
3. "Soul Deep" (Tom Lord-Alge Remix) – 3:40
4. "Megamix" – 9:04

== Credits and personnel ==
Credits are adapted from the liner notes of The Rox Box/Roxette 86–06.

Studios

- Recorded in 1990 at EMI Studios (Stockholm, Sweden)
- Mixed at EMI Studios (Stockholm, Sweden)

Musicians

- Marie Fredriksson – lead and background vocals
- Per Gessle – lead and background vocals, harmonica, mixing
- Per "Pelle" Alsing – drums
- Anders Herrlin – bass guitar, engineering
- Jonas Isacsson – guitars
- Clarence Öfwerman – keyboards, production, mixing
- Staffan Öfwerman – background vocals
- Alar Suurna – mixing, engineering

== Charts ==
=== Weekly charts ===
Chart (1992)	Peak position
Australia (ARIA)	55
Austria (Ö3 Austria Top 40)	24
Belgium (Ultratop 50 Flanders)	35
Canada Top Singles (RPM)	11
Canada Adult Contemporary (RPM)	26
Ecuador (El Siglo de Torreón)	6
Europe (Eurochart Hot 100)	28
Germany (GfK)	28
Ireland (IRMA)	24
Netherlands (Single Top 100)	59
New Zealand (Recorded Music NZ)	47
Spain (AFYVE)	40
Sweden (Sverigetopplistan)	21
UK Singles (Official Charts)	21
UK Airplay (Music Week)	23
US Billboard Hot 100	36
US Adult Contemporary (Billboard)	24
US Cash Box Top 100	32
US Adult Contemporary (Gavin Report)	23
US Top 40 (Gavin Report)	11
US Adult Contemporary (Radio & Records)	20
US Contemporary Hit Radio (Radio & Records)	15

=== Year-end charts ===
Chart (1992)	Position
Canada Top Singles (RPM)	93

== Release history ==
Region	Date	Format(s)	Label(s)	Ref.
Europe	24 February 1992	7-inch vinyl; CD	EMI	
United Kingdom	16 March 1992	7-inch vinyl; CD1	EMI	
United Kingdom	23 March 1992	CD2	EMI	
