= I Call Your Name (Roxette song) =

Single by Roxette

from the album Pearls of Passion
- B-side: "Surrender"
- Released: 20 January 1988
- Genre: Pop
- Length: 3:21
- Label: EMI
- Songwriter: Per Gessle
- Producer: Clarence Öfwerman

Roxette singles chronology
| "It Must Have Been Love (Christmas for the Broken Hearted)" (1987) | "I Call Your Name" (1988) | "Dressed for Success" (1988) |

Music video
- "I Call Your Name" on YouTube

"I Call Your Name" is a song by Swedish pop music duo Roxette, released on 20 January 1988 by EMI as the fourth and final single from their debut album, Pearls of Passion (1986). It features album track "Surrender" as its b-side, along with an extended remix of "Soul Deep", which is taken from their 1987 remix album Dance Passion. The single was only issued in Belgium, France, Germany, Luxembourg and The Netherlands. A music video was also created for the song, directed by Jeroen Kamphoff.

Several different versions of the track exist. The 1988 single remix, created by Frank Mono, differs from the original album version in that it is more rock-oriented, incorporating heavier guitars and drumming. The album version of the song was also included as a b-side on their 1992 single "Church of Your Heart". When the Pearls of Passion album was remastered and reissued in 1997, a new version of the song was issued as a promotional single in Spain. "I Call Your Name '97" peaked at number 25 on the Spanish Airplay Chart.

== Formats and track listings ==
All lyrics and music by Per Gessle.

- 7" Single (1363007)
1. "I Call Your Name" (Frank Mono Mix) – 3:21
2. "Surrender" – 4:21
- 12" Single (1363007)
1. "I Call Your Name" (Frank Mono 12" Remix) – 5:52
2. "Surrender" – 4:21
3. "Soul Deep" (Extended Mix) – 5:17

== Charts ==
| Chart (1997) | Peak position |
|---|---|
| Spanish Airplay Chart (AFYVE) | 25 |
