= Joyride (Roxette album) =

Studio album by Roxette
- Released: 25 March 1991
- Recorded: January–November 1990
- Studios: Abbey Road (London); Tits & Ass (Halmstad); EMI (Stockholm)
- Genres: Pop; pop rock
- Length: 59:02
- Label: EMI
- Producer: Clarence Öfwerman

Roxette chronology
Look Sharp! (1988)	Joyride (1991)	Tourism (1992)

Singles from Joyride
- 1. "Joyride" Released: 25 February 1991; 2. "Fading Like a Flower (Every Time You Leave)" Released: 29 April 1991; 3. "The Big L." Released: 12 August 1991; 4. "Spending My Time" Released: 14 October 1991; 5. "Church of Your Heart" Released: 24 February 1992

Joyride is the third studio album by Swedish pop rock duo Roxette, released on 25 March 1991 by EMI as the follow-up to their international breakthrough Look Sharp! (1988), as well as the non-album single "It Must Have Been Love", from the soundtrack to Pretty Woman (1990). The album was recorded over an 11-month period in Sweden. The duo experienced considerable pressure from their record label to deliver a successful follow-up album, and resisted pressure to relocate to Los Angeles and work with experienced American producers.

The album was a critical and commercial success upon release, with a retrospective review for AllMusic calling it "the work of two pop artists at the top of their game." Joyride topped the charts in seven European countries, and was certified multi-platinum in several territories. It remains one of the best-selling albums of all time in Argentina, Austria and Germany. The title track, "Fading Like a Flower (Every Time You Leave)", "The Big L.", "Spending My Time" and "Church of Your Heart" were released as singles.

The band toured extensively to support the record, performing to over 1.7 million people across four continents during the "Join the Joyride! Tour". As of 2001, the album has sold over 11 million copies worldwide. An expanded 30th-anniversary edition of the album was released on 26 November 2021.

== Background and recording ==
Roxette's primary songwriter, Per Gessle, began work on the album in February 1990 at the Tits & Ass recording studio in Halmstad—which he co-founded in 1984 with his then-Gyllene Tider bandmate, lead guitarist Mats "MP" Persson. The pair recorded rough demo versions of ten songs over a three-week period, after which they were joined by vocalist Marie Fredriksson, who then provided input on re-arranging some of the material. By the end of April, the three had completed work on over twenty-five demos.

Work was transferred to EMI Studios in Stockholm in May, where Gessle and Fredriksson were joined by producer Clarence Öfwerman. With the success of previous album Look Sharp! (1988) and its singles, as well as the non-album single "It Must Have Been Love", the duo resisted pressure from record company EMI to relocate to Los Angeles and work with American producers and musicians, opting instead to "develop our own sound" with the Swedish musicians they had worked with previously. Gessle has described the pressure to deliver a successful follow-up album as "intense", with EMI investing almost US$2 million on pre-release promotion for Joyride. Gessle later said that he wrote the album with the intention of it sounding "like a greatest hits record. ... It was never a given that Joyride was gonna be a major success just because Look Sharp! sold millions. We were lucky that the Pretty Woman movie happened in between those albums, so the world never got the chance to forget about us! I knew that Joyride had to be really focused with lots of single 'wannabes', so I think I wrote about 30 songs to make it happen. It was fun. All of us were very motivated."

"Watercolours in the Rain"
Album version of the track. The song was composed by Marie Fredriksson, and is indicative of her Swedish-language solo work.

All of the lyrics on the album were written by Gessle, who also composed the majority of its music—with the exception of "Spending My Time", "(Do You Get) Excited?" and "Perfect Day", which were co-composed with Persson; Fredriksson co-wrote the music to one of the album's louder rock songs, "Hotblooded", and is the sole composer of ballad "Watercolors in the Rain". She composed its music using lyrics which were written several years prior by Gessle, who expressed interest in the pair composing this way more regularly on future material, saying: "When it's happening like that [me writing lyrics and Marie composing music], it makes Roxette even better because it widens up what we can do, what kind of music we can make, even more. So I think she should write more." Her limited input in the songwriting of Roxette material stemmed from difficulty with writing English lyrics: she has said that it "feels very strange to write in another language." The song is more folk-orientated than any material previously recorded by the duo, and is indicative of Fredriksson's Swedish-language solo work.

== Singles and promotion ==
The title track was released as the album's first single. It became one of Roxette's biggest ever hits, and was one of the most successful singles of 1991. It was the duo's first number one single in their home country, and topped the charts in numerous other territories. The song spent eight weeks at number one in Germany, where it was certified gold by the Bundesverband Musikindustrie for sales in excess of 250,000 copies. It spent three weeks atop the Australian Singles Chart, and was their fourth and last US number one single. It also topped the singles chart in Canada, where it was nominated for a Juno Award in 1992 for Best Selling Single by a Foreign Artist. "Fading Like a Flower (Every Time You Leave)" was released as the second single. It also became a hit, particularly in North America, where it peaked at number two in both Canada and on the US Billboard Hot 100—held off the top spot in both countries by Bryan Adams' "(Everything I Do) I Do It for You". "The Big L." was released as the third single outside of North America in August, peaking within the top twenty of numerous territories.

In September, Roxette began their Join the Joyride! Tour. Opening on 4 September in Helsinki, the tour would see the band playing to over 1.7 million people during its 100 shows in Europe, Australia and North and South America. The South American leg of the tour was particularly successful, with the band playing to nearly 350,000 people at thirteen concerts, resulting in a 27% increase in album sales. The North American leg of the tour received mixed reviews. A review for the Los Angeles Times claimed that Fredriksson was "squandering her talents in pop's low-rent district. She's clearly superior to Roxette's uncomplicated, hook-crammed material"; Jon Pareles of The New York Times criticized their show for its "careful mimicry of MTV. On a set painted in Piet Mondrian primary colors, Miss Fredriksson struts, leans on the other band members, makes symmetrical arm motions, pouts and straps on a guitar to take a few chords; she took off her leather jacket and later her long sleeves, like a G-rated stripper."

"I believed this was going to be our biggest hit ever, which might have happened if not our American record company had fired a lot of... ah, never mind. It's a big song to us, anyway."
—Gessle, on the chart performance of "Spending My Time" in the US.

The end of 1991 saw the merger of the SBK, Chrysalis and EMI record labels to form EMI Records Group North America. The merger resulted in the new company firing over a hundred members of staff, and saw Roxette receiving little support from their new label. Subsequent singles from the album, "Spending My Time" and "Church of Your Heart", peaked at numbers thirty-two and thirty-six, respectively, on the Billboard Hot 100—in stark contrast to the duo's previous five singles which all peaked within the top two of the chart. A music video for "(Do You Get) Excited?" was created, although its planned single release was later cancelled.

== Release and artwork ==
Joyride was released worldwide on CD, MD, DCC, cassette and LP formats from 25 March 1991 by EMI, with varying track listings. CD and cassette editions contained fifteen tracks, with the exception of all North American editions, which omitted the song "I Remember You" and moved the re-recorded version of "Soul Deep" (originally released as a single from their 1986 debut album Pearls of Passion) up the running order. All LP versions of the album contained twelve songs: omitting "I Remember You", "Soul Deep", and the album's fifth and final single, "Church of Your Heart". The album was remastered and reissued on CD and via digital download services in 2009. This reissue restored the album's original fifteen song track list, and included three B-sides as bonus material. The version released on iTunes contained a further three bonus tracks: a demo of "Come Back (Before You Leave)", the US single version of "Joyride", and a Humberto Gatica remix of "Fading Like a Flower (Every Time You Leave)".

The album's sleeve was designed by Roxette and Kjell Andersson. It consists of brightly coloured images, which were inspired by South American carnivals, funfairs, and the artwork for the Beatles' 1967 EP Magical Mystery Tour. The principal photographer of the album's cover was Mattias Edwall, with the set designed by Mikael Varhelyi, who would later become the supervising art director of the 2011 version of The Girl with the Dragon Tattoo. The title track features The Beatles' former tour manager Dave Edwards, who is credited with narration. Gessle has said that its title was derived from an interview given by Paul McCartney, in which he described writing songs with John Lennon as "a long joyride".

A 30th-anniversary edition of the album was released on 26 November 2021. The set consisted of the 15-track version of the album and a further two CDs of rare and unreleased material; a quadruple LP version was also issued.

== Critical reception ==
Professional ratings
Review scores
Source	Rating
AllMusic	4/5 stars
Encyclopedia of Popular Music	2/5 stars
Entertainment Weekly	B+
Music & Media	(favorable)
Rolling Stone	4/5 stars

The album received generally positive reviews from music critics. AllMusic called the record the work of "two pop artists at the top of their game", and praised the album's consistency, saying: "most of the songs sound like they were designed to be hit singles, not just filler between two or three good cuts." When reviewing the album, Entertainment Weekly compared the band to ABBA, calling them "worthy successors to the tradition of air-headed catchiness set down by their fellow Swedish pop tarts", and complimented the album for an abundance of hooks. Conversely, J.D. Considine of Rolling Stone said that although Roxette had similarities to ABBA, they were "different in the way that matters most—its music", and praised the duo for their performance which he said "marks perhaps the most important difference between Roxette and [ABBA]. By emphasizing its sense of personality, Roxette delivers more than just well-constructed hooks; this music has heart, something that makes even the catchiest melody more appealing."

=== Accolades ===
In 1992, Roxette were nominated for numerous Grammis Awards, the Swedish equivalent of the Grammy Awards. "The Big L." was nominated for Music Video of the Year, and Joyride won them the Pop Group of the Year Award. Roxette and Gessle were also respectively nominated for Artist of the Year and Composer of the Year, while the album's guitarist, Jonas Isaacson, was awarded the Special Prize of the Year Award. Roxette also won several Rockbjörnen awards during this period, winning the award for Best Swedish Group at both the 1991 and 1992 ceremonies, with Joyride also winning the award for Best Album by a Swedish Group in 1991.

They were also nominated for various international awards, including Best International Group at the 1991 Brit Awards, losing to INXS. The "Joyride" music video won the International Viewer's Choice Award at the 1991 MTV Video Music Awards, while Roxette also won the award for Most Popular International Group at the ARIA Music Awards of 1991. In 1991, they won the Silver Bravo Award for Best Pop/Rock Group in Germany, and won their Gold award the following year. In 1992, they were nominated for Germany's Echo Music Prize under the category for International Group of the Year.

== Commercial performance ==
Joyride was an immediate commercial success, selling over 2.2 million copies worldwide within a month of release. In their home country, it spent seven weeks at number one on the Swedish Albums Chart, where it has been certified 6× platinum for shipments in excess of 600,000 units. It also spent nine non-consecutive weeks atop the Norwegian Albums Chart, along with a further eight weeks at number two. The album was a massive commercial success in Germany, debuting at number six before rising to the top spot the following week. In total, it spent thirteen consecutive weeks at number one on the German Albums Chart, and a further five weeks at number two. It was certified 7× gold by the BVMI, indicating shipments of over 1.75 million units, and remains one of the best-selling albums of all time in the country. Joyride spent eleven weeks at number one on the Austrian Albums Chart, and is one of highest-selling albums of all time there, where it was certified triple platinum by the IFPI for sales in excess of 150,000 copies. The record also spent sixteen weeks at number one in Switzerland, and was certified quadruple platinum there for sales in excess of 200,000 copies.

On the UK Albums Chart, Joyride debuted at number two—kept off the top spot by Eurythmics' Greatest Hits. It spent 49 weeks on the chart, and was certified double platinum by the BPI for shipments in excess of 600,000 copies. Similarly, the album spent two weeks at number two on the Australian Albums Chart, behind the Eurythmics compilation, and was certified triple platinum by the Australian Recording Industry Association. It debuted at number forty-one on the Billboard 200, on the chart dated 20 April 1991. The album would spend over a year on the chart, peaking at number twelve. It was certified platinum by the Recording Industry Association of America (RIAA) in July 1991, and had sold over 1.3 million copies in the US as of 2005. In Canada, it peaked at number three, and was certified quintuple platinum for shipments in excess of 500,000 units. It was also certified sextuple platinum in Argentina for sales of almost half a million copies. As of 2001, Joyride had sold over 11 million copies worldwide.

== Track listing ==
All lyrics are written by Per Gessle; all music is composed by Gessle, except where noted.

Joyride – Original CD and cassette release
No.	Title	Music	Length
1.	"Joyride"		4:24
2.	"Hotblooded"	Marie Fredriksson; Gessle	3:18
3.	"Fading Like a Flower (Every Time You Leave)"		3:52
4.	"Knockin' on Every Door"		3:56
5.	"Spending My Time"	Gessle; Mats MP Persson	4:36
6.	"I Remember You"		3:54
7.	"Watercolours in the Rain"	Fredriksson	3:40
8.	"The Big L."		4:26
9.	"Soul Deep"		3:34
10.	"(Do You Get) Excited?"	Gessle; Persson	4:16
11.	"Church of Your Heart"		3:16
12.	"Small Talk"		3:53
13.	"Physical Fascination"		3:27
14.	"Things Will Never Be the Same"		4:26
15.	"Perfect Day"	Gessle; Persson	4:05
Total length:			59:02

=== Notes ===
- "I Remember You" was excluded from original North American and vinyl pressings.
- "Soul Deep" and "Church of Your Heart" were excluded from original vinyl pressings.

Joyride – 2009 reissue (CD bonus tracks)
No.	Title	Music	Length
16.	"The Sweet Hello, The Sad Goodbye"		4:46
17.	"Love Spins" (Demo)		3:29
18.	"Seduce Me" (Demo)	Fredriksson; Gessle	3:54
Total length:			71:13

Joyride – 2009 reissue (iTunes bonus tracks)
No.	Title	Length
19.	"Come Back (Before You Leave)" (Demo)	4:09
20.	"Joyride" (US Remix)	4:04
21.	"Fading Like a Flower (Every Time You Leave)" (Gatica Remix)	3:55
Total length:		83:21

Joyride – 30th-anniversary edition (CD1 bonus tracks)
No.	Title	Length
16.	"The Sweet Hello, The Sad Goodbye"	4:46
17.	"Joyride" (Brian Malouf US Single Mix)	3:58
18.	"Fading Like a Flower" (Humberto Gatica US Single Mix)	3:55
19.	"Soul Deep" (Tom Lord-Alge Mix)	3:38
20.	"Spending My Time" (US Adult Contemporary Mix) (digital bonus track)	4:40
21.	"Physical Fascination" (Guitar Solo Version) (digital bonus track)	4:04
22.	"Church of Your Heart" (US Adult Contemporary Mix)	3:08

Joyride – 30th-anniversary edition (CD2)
No.	Title	Music	Length
1.	"Joyride" (T&A Demo, 23 May 1990)		4:16
2.	"Hotblooded" (T&A Demo, 23 January 1990)	Fredriksson; Gessle	3:14
3.	"Fading Like a Flower" (T&A Demo, 31 August 1990)		3:26
4.	"Knockin' on Every Door" (T&A Demo, 15 August 1989)		3:47
5.	"Spending My Time" (T&A Demo, 24 May 1990)	Gessle; Persson	4:14
6.	"I Remember You" (T&A Demo, 1 April 1990)		3:32
7.	"Watercolours in the Rain" (T&A Demo, 24 January 1990)	Fredriksson; Gessle	4:01
8.	"The Big L." (T&A Demo, 29 March 1990)		3:51
9.	"(Do You Get) Excited?" (T&A Demo, 19 August 1989)	Gessle; Persson	4:12
10.	"Small Talk" (T&A Demo, 30 August 1990)		3:32
11.	"Church of Your Heart" (T&A Demo, 8 January 1990)		3:13
12.	"Physical Fascination" (T&A Demo, 3 January 1990)		4:11
13.	"Things Will Never Be the Same" (T&A Demo, 17 June 1989)		2:41
14.	"Perfect Day" (T&A Demo, 23 August 1990)	Gessle; Persson	3:45

Joyride – 30th-anniversary edition (CD3)
No.	Title	Music	Length
1.	"Sweet Thing" (T&A Demo, 28 October 1990)		2:57
2.	"Seduce Me" (T&A Demo, 22 August 1990)	Fredriksson; Gessle	3:55
3.	"Run Run Run" (T&A Demo, 10 January 1990)		4:01
4.	"Things Will Never Be the Same" (T&A Demo, 17 September 1989)		5:01
5.	"Love Spins" (T&A Demo, 3 January 1990)		3:29
6.	"Come Back (Before You Leave)" (T&A Demo, 8 April 1990)		4:01
7.	"The Sweet Hello, The Sad Goodbye" (T&A Demo, 16 March 1990)		4:37
8.	"Hotblooded" (T&A Demo, 13 December 1990)	Fredriksson; Gessle	3:24
9.	"Things Will Never Be the Same" (T&A Demo, 13 December 1990)		3:11
10.	"Another Place, Another Time" (T&A Demo, 11 January 1990)		3:40
11.	"I Remember You" (T&A Demo, 15 March 1990)		3:47
12.	"Queen of Rain" (T&A Demo, 2 January 1990)	Gessle; Persson	4:28
13.	"The Big L." (T&A Demo, 1 April 1990)		4:10
14.	"Joyrider" (T&A Demo, 22 May 1990)		3:39
15.	"Hotblooded" (Live at the Sydney Entertainment Centre, 13 December 1991)	Fredriksson; Gessle	3:54
16.	"Fading Like a Flower" (Live at the Sydney Entertainment Centre, 13 December 1991)		4:09

== Personnel ==
- Roxette are Per Gessle and Marie Fredriksson
- Recorded at Tits & Ass Studios, Halmstad and EMI Studios, Stockholm, Sweden
- Remastered by Alar Suurna at Polar Studio, Stockholm (2009 reissue)
- All songs published by Jimmy Fun Music, except: "Hotblooded" and "Watercolors in the Rain" by Shock the Music/Jimmy Fun Music; "Soul Deep" by Happy Accident Music

Musicians

- Vocals – Marie Fredriksson and Per Gessle
- Accordion – Kjell Öhman (on "Perfect Day")
- Backing vocals – Marianne Flynner, Mia Lindgren, Staffan Öfwerman, Anne-Lie Rydé
- Bass guitar, programming – Anders Herrlin
- Drums – Per "Pelle" Alsing
- Guitars, mandolin and slide guitar – Jonas Isacsson
- Grand piano - Clarence Öfwerman
- Hammond and barrel organs, keyboards, mixing, production and programming – Clarence Öfwerman
- Harmonica – Jarl "Jalle" Lorensson (on "Hotblooded"); Jonas Isacsson (on "The Big L."); Gessle (on "Church of Your Heart")
- Narration – Dave Edwards
- Percussion – Mats Persson
- Rhythm guitar, tambourine, whistling – Gessle
- String arrangement and conducting – Hernik Jansson (on "Watercolors in the Rain"); Clarence Öfwerman (on "Perfect Day")
- Trumpet – Uno Forsberg, Mikael Renlinden, Tomas Sjörgen (on "Soul Deep")

Technical

- Engineered by Alar Suurna, Anders Herrlin and Lennart Haglund
- Mastered by George Marino at Sterling Sound, NYC
- Photography by Mattias Edwall
- Set designed by Mikael Varhelyi
- Sleeve designed by Roxette and Kjell Andersson

== Charts ==
=== Weekly charts ===
Weekly chart performance for Joyride
Chart (1991)	Peak; position
Australian Albums (ARIA)	2
Austrian Albums (Ö3 Austria)	1
Belgian Albums (IFPI)	3
Canada Top Albums/CDs (RPM)	3
Danish Albums (Hitlisten)	1
Dutch Albums (Album Top 100)	4
European Albums (Music & Media)	1
Finnish Albums (Suomen virallinen lista)	1
German Albums (Offizielle Top 100)	1
Greek Albums (IFPI)	2
Hungarian Albums (MAHASZ)	4
Irish Albums (IFPI)	6
Italian Albums (Musica e dischi)	17
Japanese Albums (Oricon)	12
New Zealand Albums (RMNZ)	4
Norwegian Albums (VG-lista)	1
Spanish Albums (AFYVE)	6
Swedish Albums (Sverigetopplistan)	1
Swiss Albums (Schweizer Hitparade)	1
UK Albums (Official Charts)	2
US Billboard 200	12

=== Year-end charts ===
1991 year-end chart performance for Joyride
Chart (1991)	Position
Argentina Foreign Albums (CAPIF)	1
Australian Albums (ARIA)	10
Austrian Albums (Ö3 Austria)	1
Canada Top Albums/CDs (RPM)	12
Dutch Albums (Album Top 100)	5
European Albums (Music & Media)	2
German Albums (Offizielle Top 100)	2
New Zealand Albums (RMNZ)	33
Norwegian Russefeiring Period Albums (VG-lista)	2
Swiss Albums (Schweizer Hitparade)	2
UK Albums (OCC)	21
US Billboard 200	52

1992 year-end chart performance for Joyride
Chart (1992)	Position
European Albums (Music & Media)	60
German Albums (Offizielle Top 100)	14

== Certifications and sales ==
Certifications and sales for Joyride
Region	Certification	Certified units/sales
Argentina (CAPIF)	6× Platinum	400,000
Australia (ARIA)	3× Platinum	210,000^{^}
Austria (IFPI Austria)	3× Platinum	150,000^{*}
Canada (Music Canada)	5× Platinum	500,000^{^}
Denmark	—	160,000
Finland (Musiikkituottajat)	2× Platinum	101,197
Germany (BVMI)	7× Gold	1,750,000^{^}
Netherlands (NVPI)	3× Platinum	300,000^{^}
New Zealand (RMNZ)	Gold	7,500^{^}
Spain (Promusicae)	2× Platinum	200,000^{^}
Sweden (GLF)	6× Platinum	660,000
Switzerland (IFPI Switzerland)	4× Platinum	200,000^{^}
United Kingdom (BPI)	2× Platinum	600,000^{^}
United States (RIAA)	Platinum	1,300,000
Summaries
Worldwide	—	11,000,000
^{*} Sales figures based on certification alone.^{^} Shipments figures based on certification alone.

== See also ==
- List of best-selling albums in Argentina
- List of best-selling albums in Austria
- List of best-selling albums in Germany
