= I Want You (Roxette song) =

Single by Eva Dahlgren, Ratata and Roxette
- Released: 1 July 1987
- Songwriters: Eva Dahlgren; Per Gessle; Marie Fredriksson; Mauro Scocco; Johan Ekelund; Anders Glenmark
- Producer: Glenmark

Roxette singles chronology
"Soul Deep" (1987)	"I Want You" (1987)	"It Must Have Been Love (Christmas for the Broken Hearted)" (1987)

Eva Dahlgren singles chronology
""Himlen kan vente"(with Henrik Strube)" (1986)	"I Want You" (1987)	""Hjärtats ödsliga slag"(with Uno Svenningsson)" (1987)

Ratata singles chronology
"Ingenstans att gå" (1986)	"I Want You" (1987)	""Så länge vi har varann" (with Frida)" (1987)

"I Want You" is a song written and performed by Swedish recording artists Marie Fredriksson and Per Gessle (Roxette), Mauro Scocco and Johan Ekelund (Ratata) and solo artist Eva Dahlgren, and was co-written and produced by Anders Glenmark. It was recorded in June 1987, immediately prior to the commencement of "Rock Runt Riket" ("Rock Around the Kingdom"), a 15-date joint tour of Sweden. It was performed by all three acts together as an encore during every date of the tour.

The single was limited to just 750 copies on 7" vinyl, which were exclusively sold at the venue on the night of each concert date. The song has never been included on a studio or compilation album released by any of the artists involved, and is considered the rarest release ever issued by Roxette.

== Formats and track listings ==
- 7" single (TATI-7)
1. "I Want You" – 4:37
2. "I Want You" (Digital Lägerelds Mix) – 3:30

== Personnel ==
- Audio engineering — Lennart Östlund
- Audio mastering — Olle Ramm
- Bass — Matts Alsberg
- Drums — Per "Pelle" Alsing
- Guitar — Henrik Janson
- Keyboards — Clarence Öfwerman
- Vocals — Eva Dahlgren, Mauro Scocco, Johan Ekelund, Marie Fredriksson and Per Gessle
