= Chances (Roxette song) =

Single by Roxette

from the album Look Sharp!
- B-side: "Silver Blue" (Demo)
- Released: 28 December 1988
- Recorded: June 1988
- Studio: Trident II Studios, London
- Genre: Pop rock
- Length: 4:07
- Label: EMI
- Songwriter(s): Per Gessle
- Producer(s): Adam Moseley

Roxette singles chronology
"Listen to Your Heart" (1988)	"Chances" (1988)	"The Look" (1989)

Music video
- "Chances" on YouTube

"Chances" is a song by Swedish pop music duo Roxette, released on 28 December 1988 by EMI as the first international single from their second studio album, Look Sharp! (1988). The single was issued on 7" and 12" vinyl formats exclusively in West Germany, France and Italy, where it failed to chart. The single was followed two weeks later by "The Look", which became their breakthrough international hit.

== Composition and style ==
"Chances" is a pop rock song, containing instrumentation and elements indicative of hard rock and industrial pop. The album version has a length of four minutes and fifty-seven seconds, while the single edit is fifty seconds shorter. The song is performed in the key of E minor, and is composed in the 4/4 time signature with an allegro moderato tempo of 118 beats per minute. The intro is composed of two repetitions of an E♭–D♭–B♭–C♯ sequence, and each verse and pre-chorus consists of two sequences of Em–D–Bm–C. The refrain is built on two repetitions of Em–C–G–D, followed by an extended sequence of Am–Bm–Em–C–G–D. The basic chord structure of the first half of the bridge, which contains a guitar solo, consists of two repetitions of Fm–D♭–A♭–E♭, followed by a single sequence of B♭–Fm–Cm. Upon completion of the guitar solo, the remainder of the bridge consists of a repeating F–Fm–Cm–Fm–D♭ pattern, followed by a single abbreviated sequence of Fm–Cm–A♭m.

== Production and release ==
The song was one of three tracks on Look Sharp! to be produced by Adam Moseley at Trident Studios in London. EMI Germany chose to release the song as the album's first international single on 28 December 1988, following the Swedish-only singles "Dressed for Success" and "Listen to Your Heart". Per Gessle later commented that it was chosen "probably because it was one of the English songs, not because it was one of the best. The single was a complete failure." It failed to chart in the three territories where it was released: France, West Germany, and Italy. The single was backed by a demo version of "Silver Blue", which later appeared in re-recorded form on the duo's 1992 album Tourism. A music video was also produced for "Chances". Directed by Jeroen Kamphoff, it alters between concert footage in color, and black-and-white footage from a casino with Marie Fredriksson as a Black Jack dealer and croupier at a Roulette-table, and Gessle as a gambler.

== Formats and track listings ==
All songs written and composed by Per Gessle.

- 7" single (France 1363247 · West Germany 006-1363247 · Italy 06-1363247)
1. "Chances" (Edit) – 4:07
2. "Silver Blue" (Demo) – 4:06
- 12" single (France 1599566 · West Germany 060-1363276 · Italy 14-1363276)
1. "Chances" (Dancehall Version) – 8:24
2. "Chances" (Edit) – 4:07
3. "Silver Blue" (Demo) – 4:06

== Personnel ==
Credits adapted from the liner notes of Look Sharp!.

- Recorded at Trident II Studios in London in June 1988.

Musicians

- Marie Fredriksson – lead and background vocals
- Per Gessle – background vocals and mixing
- Julian Adair – production assistant
- Graham Edwards – bass guitar
- Morris Michael – electric and acoustic guitars
- Adam Moseley – engineering and production
- Clarence Öfwerman – mixing
- Alar Suurna – mixing
- Andrew Wright – keyboards and programming
