= World on Edge =

Canadian pop-rock music group

- Origin: Quebec, Canada
- Genres: Pop-rock
- Years active: 1990s
- Past members: Rob Meyer; Steph Thompson; Peter Hopkins; Jon Daniels

World On Edge were a Canadian pop-rock group from Quebec from the early 1990s. The four-some comprised Rob Meyer, Steph Thompson, Peter Hopkins, and Jon Daniels.

== History ==
The World on Edge members worked together in (West) Germany with Christian Schudde, their co-producer. Their self-titled debut album World on Edge was released in 1991. It produced six singles which reached the Top 40 (based on a combination of charts from 'RPM 100 Singles' and 'The Record'); their best-known hit was "Still Beating".

In 1992, the band was nominated as "most promising group of the year" at the Juno Awards, but did not win.

The 1993 follow-up album, Against All Gods, received little air play and the video to the lead single "Who Shot Harry" was not aired by Muchmusic. Album sales were weak; the group disbanded soon after.

They toured with Roxette on the Canadian leg of that group's 1992 Canadian tour.

== Singles ==
Year	Song	CAN
1990	"Still Beating"	16
1991	"Only the Lonely"	14
1991	"Wash the Rain"	14
1991	"Standing, Push and Fall"	22
1991	"Little Lack of Love"	32
1992	"Love Like Candy"	89
1992	"Goodbye"	39
1993	"Big Sky"	-
1994	"Who Shot Harry"	-
