= Pearls of Passion =

Studio album by Roxette
- Released: 31 October 1986
- Recorded: March–September 1986
- Studio: EMI (Stockholm)
- Genre: Dance-pop
- Length: 48:27
- Label: EMI
- Producer: Clarence Öfwerman

Roxette chronology
Pearls of Passion (1986)	Dance Passion (1987)

Singles from Pearls of Passion
- 1. "Neverending Love" Released: 8 July 1986; 2. "Goodbye to You" Released: 27 November 1986; 3. "Soul Deep" Released: 18 February 1987; 4. "I Call Your Name" Released: 20 January 1988

Pearls of Passion is the debut studio album by Swedish pop duo Roxette, originally released on cassette and vinyl on 31 October 1986 in Scandinavia and Canada. The album was remastered and released on CD on 31 October 1997, with several previously unreleased bonus tracks. It was remastered and re-released again in 2009.

== Background and recording ==
Roxette is a Swedish duo consisting of Marie Fredriksson and Per Gessle, which comprised established artists in their home country prior to the duo forming. Gessle had experienced considerable commercial success with his previous band Gyllene Tider, releasing three number one albums in Sweden during the early '80s. When the band broke up in 1984, however, Gessle's solo albums failed to replicate that level of success: 1983's Per Gessle and 1985's Scener both failed commercially. The latter peaked at number 39 on Sverigetopplistan, and sold less than 20,000 copies—a substantial drop from 400,000 copies sold by Gyllene Tider's self-titled debut album five years earlier. Gessle later revealed his contract with EMI Sweden was close to being terminated after the commercial performance of Scener.

Meanwhile, Fredriksson was also signed to EMI Sweden, and had released two commercially successful albums: 1984's Het vind and 1986's Den sjunde vågen, as well as several hit singles. On the advice of Rolf Nygren – the managing director of EMI Sweden – Gessle translated a song called "Svarta glas" ("Black Glass") into English. It was originally written for Pernilla Wahlgren. Nygren then suggested that Gessle record the song as a duet with Fredriksson. This became the duo's first single, "Neverending Love", which peaked at number three on the Swedish Singles Chart. The rest of the album was recorded sporadically throughout the summer of 1986.

Dance Passion, a compilation EP containing seven remixed versions of tracks found on Pearls of Passion, was released in Sweden in 1987, and a further two songs from the album were re-recorded for inclusion on later Roxette albums: CD versions of 1991's Joyride contained a version of "Soul Deep", while Tourism, released the following year, contained an acoustic version of "So Far Away".

== Critical reception ==
Jason Damas from AllMusic gave the album a negative review, rating it one-and-a-half stars out of five and writing: "Nothing here is bad, but it lacks nearly all of the elements that made Look Sharp! and Joyride massive hits just a few years later." He elaborated that "Roxette's most intriguing qualities are that they are a pop band that can rock, and that Per Gessle is a crack songwriter that almost never produces a bad tune. Here, however, there's a lot of indistinguishable dance-pop, and their trademark gritty guitars are completely absent". He went on to say that the album contained three great songs: "Soul Deep", "Neverending Love" and "Secrets That She Keeps", but charactised the rest of the album as being "insignificant, except to the most serious of fans."

== Commercial performance ==
The record was an immediate commercial success in Sweden, peaking at number two on the albums chart, and going on to sell over 200,000 copies by the end of 1987. However, it failed to chart internationally. "Neverending Love", "Goodbye to You", "Soul Deep" and "I Call Your Name" were released as singles, with the first three becoming top twenty hits in Sweden. A non-album single, "It Must Have Been Love (Christmas for the Broken Hearted)", was released in December 1987, and became their second top five hit there. The song was later re-recorded – with the reference to Christmas changed to a neutral winter reference ("It's a hard Christmas Day" replaced by "It's a hard winter's day") – and became a substantial international hit after appearing on the soundtrack to the 1990 film Pretty Woman.

Pearls of Passion was remastered and released on CD for the first time eleven years after its original release, on 31 October 1997. Three songs were re-released as promotional singles in selected territories to promote the reissue: "From One Heart to Another" was issued as a promotional single in Brazil, and a slightly remixed version of "I Call Your Name" – "I Call Your Name '97" – was released as an airplay-only single in Spain. EMI Spain also reissued "Neverending Love", to commemorate shipments of over 50,000 units of the album in that country. As of 2001, Pearls of Passion has sold 800,000 copies worldwide.

== Track listing ==
All lyrics and music written by Per Gessle, except where noted.

Pearls of Passion – Original release
No.	Title	Lyrics	Music	Length
1.	"Soul Deep"			3:41
2.	"Secrets That She Keeps"			3:48
3.	"Goodbye to You"			4:03
4.	"I Call Your Name"			3:39
5.	"Surrender"			4:23
6.	"Voices"		Marie Fredriksson; Per Andersson	4:46
7.	"Neverending Love"			3:30
8.	"Call of the Wild"			4:32
9.	"Joy of a Toy"		Gessle; Mats "M.P." Persson	3:09
10.	"From One Heart to Another"			4:11
11.	"Like Lovers Do"			3:25
12.	"So Far Away"	Gessle; Hasse Huss		5:17
Total length:				48:27

Pearls of Passion – 1997 CD reissue (bonus tracks)
No.	Title	Music	Length
13.	"Pearls of Passion"		3:35
14.	"It Must Have Been Love (Christmas for the Broken Hearted)"		4:49
15.	"Turn to Me"	Fredriksson	2:58
16.	"Neverending Love" (Tits & Ass demo / 1986)		2:45
17.	"Secrets That She Keeps" (Tits & Ass demo / 1986)		2:54
18.	"I Call Your Name" (Montezuma demo / 26.07.86)		3:04
19.	"Neverending Love" (Frank Mono-Mix / 1987)		3:19
20.	"I Call Your Name" (Frank Mono-Mix / 1987)		3:21
Total length:			74:35

Pearls of Passion – 2009 reissue (CD bonus tracks)
No.	Title	Length
13.	"Pearls of Passion"	3:35
14.	"Neverending Love" (Tits & Ass demo / 1986)	2:45
15.	"Secrets That She Keeps" (Tits & Ass demo / 1986)	2:54

Pearls of Passion – 2009 reissue (iTunes bonus tracks)
No.	Title	Length
16.	"I Call Your Name" (Montezuma demo / 26.07.86)	3:04
17.	"Neverending Love" (Frank Mono-Mix / 1987)	3:19
18.	"I Call Your Name" (Frank Mono-Mix / 1987)	3:21

== Personnel ==
Credits adapted from the liner notes of Pearls of Passion.

- Roxette are Per Gessle and Marie Fredriksson
- Recorded at EMI Studios, Stockholm, Sweden
- Remastered by Alar Suurna at Polar Studio, Stockholm (1997 version)
- All songs published by Jimmy Fun Music, except: "Soul Deep" by Happy Accident Music; "From One Heart to Another" by Sweden Music AB; "Voices" and "Turn to Me" by Shock the Music/Jimmy Fun Music

Musicians

- Marie Fredriksson – vocals, backing vocals and keyboards
- Per Gessle – vocals and backing vocals
- Per "Pelle" Alsing – drums
- Tommy Cassemar – bass guitar
- Jonas Isacsson – guitars
- Clarence Öfwerman – keyboards, musical arrangements and production

Technical

- Kjell Andersson – sleeve design
- Carl Bengtsson – photography
- Björn Boström – engineering (track 7)
- Lisa Häggqvist – make-up
- Robert Wellerfors – engineering

Additional musicians

- Matts Alsberg – acoustic bass guitar (track 6)
- Per Andersson – drums and musical arrangements (tracks 2 and 6)
- Staffan Astner – guitars (track 2)
- Marianne Flynner – backing vocals (track 1)
- Uno Forsberg – trumpet (track 1)
- Mats "M.P." Persson – guitars (track 7), percussion (tracks 1–2, 4, 8–12)
- Mikael Renlinden – trumpet (track 1)
- Anne-Lie Rydé – backing vocals (track 1)
- Tomas Sjögren – trumpet (track 1)
- Alar Suurna – percussion (track 6); engineering
- Tim Werner – drums (track 7)

== Charts ==
Chart performance for Pearls of Passion
Chart (1986)	Peak position
Swedish Albums (Sverigetopplistan)	2

== Certifications ==
Certifications for Pearls of Passion
Region	Certification	Certified units/sales
Sweden (GLF)	Platinum	280,000
