= Goodbye to You (Roxette song) =

Single by Roxette

from the album Pearls of Passion
- Released: 3 December 1986
- Recorded: September 1986
- Studio: EMI Studios, Stockholm
- Genre: Pop
- Length: 4:00
- Label: EMI
- Songwriter(s): Per Gessle
- Producer(s): Clarence Öfwerman

Roxette singles chronology
"Neverending Love" (1986)	"Goodbye to You" (1986)	"Soul Deep" (1987)

"Goodbye to You" is a song by Swedish pop music duo Roxette, released on 3 December 1986 by EMI as the second single from their debut studio album, Pearls of Passion (1986). The song was written by Per Gessle, and was backed by album track "So Far Away". It was only released commercially on 7" vinyl exclusively in Sweden, although a limited test pressing 12" vinyl was also created, containing an exclusive remix of the song. The single peaked at number nine on the Swedish Singles Chart. No music video was created for the track.

== Formats and track listings ==
All lyrics and music written by Per Gessle, except "So Far Away" lyrics by Gessle and Hasse Huss

- 7" Single (1362507)
1. "Goodbye to You" – 4:00
2. "So Far Away" – 5:13
- Promo 12" Single (1362516)
1. "Goodbye to You" (Different Mix) – 6:43
2. "Goodbye to You" – 4:00
3. "So Far Away" – 5:13

== Personnel ==
Credits adapted from the liner notes of The Rox Box/Roxette 86–06.

- Recorded at EMI Studios in Stockholm, Sweden in September 1986.

Musicians

- Marie Fredriksson – lead and background vocals
- Per Gessle – lead and background vocals
- Per "Pelle" Alsing – drums
- Tommy Cassemar – bass guitar
- Jonas Isacsson – electric guitar
- Clarence Öfwerman – keyboards and production
- Alar Suurna – engineering and mixing

== Charts ==
Chart (1986)	Peak position
Sweden (Sverigetopplistan)	9
