= Look Sharp! (Roxette album) =

Studio album by Roxette
- Released: 21 October 1988
- Recorded: March–September 1988
- Studios: EMI (Stockholm); Trident II (London)
- Genres: Pop; pop rock
- Length: 53:12
- Label: EMI
- Producers: Clarence Öfwerman; Adam Moseley

Roxette chronology
| Dance Passion (1987) | Look Sharp! (1988) | Joyride (1991) |

Singles from Look Sharp!
- 1. "Dressed for Success" Released: 3 August 1988; 2. "Listen to Your Heart" Released: 27 September 1988; 3. "Chances" Released: 28 December 1988; 4. "The Look" Released: 12 January 1989; 5. "Dangerous" Released: 10 May 1989

Look Sharp! is the second studio album by Swedish pop rock duo Roxette, released on 21 October 1988 by EMI, two years after their debut Pearls of Passion (1986). It was recorded at EMI Studios in Stockholm and at Trident II Studios in London between March and September 1988. The album was an immediate commercial success in Sweden, debuting at number one and eventually being certified 6× platinum there.

Although commercial success elsewhere was initially modest, the album was the duo's international breakthrough. It went on to be certified platinum or multi-platinum in numerous territories, while four of its singles attained commercial success. In the United States, the album was released on March 14 1989, and certified platinum and the singles "The Look" and "Listen to Your Heart" both topped the Billboard Hot 100, while "Dangerous" and "Dressed for Success" reached numbers 2 and 14, respectively, on the same chart.

== Background and release ==
"Dressed for Success" and "Listen to Your Heart" were released as the album's first two singles in Sweden, with Per Gessle and EMI choosing to highlight Marie Fredriksson as Roxette's lead vocalist. They were immediate hits in Sweden, peaking at numbers two and three, respectively. "Chances" was released as the album's first single in France, Germany and Italy, but it failed to chart.

"The Look" was released as the album's fourth single in January 1989, becoming another top 10 hit in their home country. While studying there, an American exchange student from Minneapolis, Dean Cushman, purchased the album and brought it home, giving a copy of it to his local Top 40 radio station, KDWB 101.3 FM. "The Look" quickly became popular, and the station began distributing the track to their sister radio operations. EMI America had previously rejected the duo as unsuitable for the American market, and Roxette did not have a recording contract there.

"The Look" had already entered the top 50 of the Billboard Hot 100 before the duo began official promotion. It would go on to peak at number one eight weeks later. It gradually became a global hit over the next year, topping the charts in 25 countries. It also spent six weeks at number one on the Australian Singles Chart. The album's previous singles (excluding "Chances") were re-released internationally. Roxette would go on to have four number ones on the Billboard Hot 100, including "Listen to Your Heart"; while the album's final single, "Dangerous", peaked at number two.

== Critical reception ==
Professional ratings
Review scores
| Source | Rating |
|---|---|
| AllMusic | 4.5/5 stars |
| Encyclopedia of Popular Music | 3/5 stars |
| Los Angeles Times | 2/5 stars |
| Number One | 3/5 stars |

The album received mixed reviews from critics. In a retrospective review, AllMusic complimented its singles, but said that the album tracks "aren't necessarily filler, but they also aren't as strong as many of the cuts that made up Roxette albums that followed. [...] Only 'Chances' and 'Shadow of a Doubt' show glimmers of the skills the duo would soon flourish." A review for Los Angeles Times echoed a similar sentiment, praising its singles and "Shadow of a Doubt"—along with "Cry"—but said that: "the problem is that most of Look Sharp!'s music is of such a light, ephemeral nature that it disappears without a trace the minute the record leaves the turntable. Looks like Roxette's forte is pop music that is prettily presented but totally disposable."

=== Accolades ===
Roxette were nominated for two Grammis Awards—the Swedish equivalent of the Grammy Awards—in 1989, for Artist of the Year and Best Pop/Rock Group. Fredriksson and Gessle each won an award for Best Pop/Rock Female and Best Composer, respectively. Both Roxette and Fredriksson won numerous Rockbjörnen awards during this period. They were awarded Best Swedish Album and Best Swedish Group at the 1988 ceremony, and won the latter award again the following year. Fredriksson won the award for Best Swedish Female over four consecutive years, from 1986 to 1989.

== Commercial performance ==
Look Sharp! was an immediate commercial success in Sweden, selling over 140,000 copies within ten days of release. It spent seven weeks at number one, and was certified platinum in the country for shipments in excess of 100,000 units. In the US, the album was certified platinum on 20 January 1990 by the RIAA for shipments in excess of one million units. As of 2009, it sold 408,000 copies there since Nielsen SoundScan began tracking sales data in May 1991. It peaked at number four in the UK, where it spent over a year on the charts. It was certified platinum by the BPI in December 1990 for sales in excess of 300,000. As of 2001, Look Sharp! had sold over 9 million copies worldwide.

== Track listing ==
All lyrics are written by Per Gessle; all music is composed by Gessle, except where noted.

Look Sharp! – Original cassette and vinyl
| No. | Title | Music | Producer | Length |
|---|---|---|---|---|
| 1. | "The Look" | | Clarence Öfwerman | 3:57 |
| 2. | "Dressed for Success" | | Öfwerman | 4:09 |
| 3. | "Sleeping Single" | | Öfwerman | 4:38 |
| 4. | "Paint" | | Öfwerman | 3:30 |
| 5. | "Dance Away" | Marie Fredriksson; Gessle | Öfwerman | 3:25 |
| 6. | "Cry" | Fredriksson; Gessle | Adam Moseley | 5:19 |
| 7. | "Chances" | | Moseley | 4:57 |
| 8. | "Dangerous" | | Öfwerman | 3:48 |
| 9. | "Half a Woman, Half a Shadow" | Fredriksson | Öfwerman | 3:35 |
| 10. | "View from a Hill" | | Moseley | 3:40 |
| 11. | "Shadow of a Doubt" | Gessle; Mats MP Persson | Öfwerman | 4:14 |
| 12. | "Listen to Your Heart" | Gessle; Persson | Öfwerman | 5:28 |
| Total length: | | | | 50:40 |

Look Sharp! – Original CD
| No. | Title | Music | Producer | Length |
|---|---|---|---|---|
| 11. | "(I Could Never) Give You Up" | Gessle | Öfwerman | 3:58 |
| 12. | "Shadow of a Doubt" | Gessle; Persson | Öfwerman | 4:14 |
| 13. | "Listen to Your Heart" | Gessle; Persson | Öfwerman | 5:28 |
| Total length: | | | | 54:38 |

Look Sharp! – 2009 reissue (CD bonus tracks)
| No. | Title | Producer | Length |
|---|---|---|---|
| 14. | "The Voice" | Öfwerman | 4:14 |
| 15. | "One Is Such a Lonely Number" (Demo) | Öfwerman | 3:31 |
| 16. | "Don't Believe in Accidents" (Demo) | Gessle | 3:41 |
| Total length: | | | 66:04 |

Look Sharp! – 2009 reissue (iTunes bonus tracks)
| No. | Title | Music | Length |
|---|---|---|---|
| 17. | "Cry" (Demo) | Fredriksson; Gessle | 5:07 |
| 18. | "Dressed for Success" (Chris Lord-Alge/US Single Mix) | | 4:10 |
| 19. | "Listen to Your Heart" (US Single Mix) | Gessle; Persson | 4:52 |
| 20. | "Surrender" (Live) | | 3:09 |
| 21. | "Neverending Love" (Live) | | 3:27 |
| Total length: | | | 86:49 |

Look Sharp! – 30th Anniversary Edition (bonus disc)
| No. | Title | Length |
|---|---|---|
| 1. | "The Look" (T&A Demo) (30 March 1988) | 3:29 |
| 2. | "Dressed for Success" (T&A Demo) (20 May 1987) | 3:22 |
| 3. | "Dressed for Success" (EMI Demo) (26–30 May 1987) | 3:53 |
| 4. | "Sleeping Single" (T&A Demo) (22 May 1987) | 3:54 |
| 5. | "Sleeping Single" (EMI Demo) (26–30 May 1987) | 3:48 |
| 6. | "Paint" (T&A Demo) (28 April 1988) | 3:36 |
| 7. | "Dance Away" (T&A Demo) (9 February 1988) | 3:36 |
| 8. | "Cry" (T&A Demo) (9 February 1988) | 5:08 |
| 9. | "Chances" (T&A Demo) (24 November 1987) | 4:19 |
| 10. | "Dangerous (Acoustic Version)" (T&A Demo) (25 February 1987) | 3:08 |
| 11. | "Dangerous" (EMI Demo) (26–30 May 1987) | 3:29 |
| 12. | "View from a Hill" (T&A Demo) (17 November 1987) | 3:17 |
| 13. | "(I Could Never) Give You Up" (T&A Demo) (18 December 1987) | 3:45 |
| 14. | "Shadow of a Doubt" (T&A Demo) (9 February 1988) | 3:12 |
| 15. | "Listen to Your Heart" (T&A Demo) (9 May 1988) | 4:26 |
| 16. | "From Head to Toe" (EMI Demo) (26–30 May 1987) | 3:20 |
| 17. | "Never Is a Long Time" (EMI Demo) (26–30 May 1987) | 3:53 |
| 18. | "(I Could Never) Give You Up" (Album Version) (bonus track on vinyl editions of the reissue) | 4:00 |
| 19. | "The Voice" | 4:16 |
| 20. | "One Is Such a Lonely Number" (EMI Demo) (September 1987) | 3:34 |
| 21. | "Don't Believe in Accidents" (Demo) (Spring 1988) | 3:43 |
| Total length: | | 79:08 |

Look Sharp! – 2022 digital version (disc 2)
| No. | Title | Length |
|---|---|---|
| 1. | "The Voice" | 4:14 |
| 2. | "One Is Such a Lonely Number" (Demo, September 1987) | 3:31 |
| 3. | "Don't Believe in Accidents" (Demo, Spring 1988) | 3:41 |
| 4. | "The Look" (T&A Demo) (30 March 1988) | 3:27 |
| 5. | "Dressed for Success" (T&A Demo) (20 May 1987) | 3:20 |
| 6. | "Dressed for Success" (EMI Demo) (26–30 May 1987) | 3:51 |
| 7. | "Sleeping Single" (T&A Demo) (22 May 1987) | 3:52 |
| 8. | "Sleeping Single" (EMI Demo) (26–30 May 1987) | 3:45 |
| 9. | "Paint" (T&A Demo) (28 April 1988) | 3:34 |
| 10. | "Dance Away" (T&A Demo) (9 February 1988) | 3:34 |
| 11. | "Cry" (T&A Demo) (9 February 1988) | 5:07 |
| 12. | "Chances" (T&A Demo) (24 November 1987) | 4:16 |
| 13. | "Dangerous" (T&A Demo) (11 February 1987) | 3:22 |
| 14. | "Dangerous (Acoustic Version)" (T&A Demo) (25 February 1987) | 3:05 |
| 15. | "Dangerous" (EMI Demo) (26–30 May 1987) | 3:27 |
| 16. | "View from a Hill" (T&A Demo) (17 November 1987) | 3:14 |
| 17. | "(I Could Never) Give You Up" (T&A Demo) (18 December 1987) | 3:42 |
| 18. | "Shadow of a Doubt" (T&A Demo) (9 February 1988) | 3:10 |
| 19. | "Listen to Your Heart" (T&A Demo) (9 May 1988) | 4:23 |
| 20. | "Boom Boom (And Boom Boom Again)" (T&A Demo) (15 September 1987) | 2:56 |
| 21. | "In My Own Way" (T&A Demo) (15 September 1987) | 3:15 |
| 22. | "Love Spins" (T&A Demo) (15 September 1987) | 3:05 |
| 23. | "Love Spins" (T&A Demo) (18 November 1987) | 3:22 |
| 24. | "One Is Such a Lonely Number" (T&A Demo) (26 August 1987) | 3:21 |
| 25. | "Drowning in You" (T&A Demo) (17 April 1988) | 3:50 |
| 26. | "Silver Blue" (T&A Demo) (21 May 1987) | 3:58 |
| 27. | "The Thrill of It All" (T&A Demo) (26 August 1987) | 2:42 |
| 28. | "Physical Fascination" (T&A Demo) (17 April 1988) | 3:37 |
| 29. | "From Head to Toe" (EMI Demo) (26–30 May 1987) | 3:17 |
| 30. | "Never Is a Long Time" (EMI Demo) (26–30 May 1987) | 3:50 |
| 31. | "Never Is a Long Time" (T&A Demo) (11 November 1987) | 3:48 |
| 32. | "Let's Party!" (T&A Demo) (14 July 1988) | 3:59 |
| 33. | "Start!" (T&A Demo) (19 February 1988) | 3:04 |
| 34. | "Night Wire" (T&A Demo) (9 April 1987) | 2:48 |
| 35. | "Pocketful of Rain" (T&A Demo) (12 June 1987) | 4:01 |
| 36. | "Rocket" (T&A Demo) (9 April 1987) | 3:08 |
| 37. | "The Voice" (T&A Demo) (24 March 1987) | 3:44 |
| 38. | "Silver Blue" (EMI Demo) (May 1988) | 4:12 |
| 39. | "Here Comes the Weekend" (T&A Demo) (30 March 1988) | 4:11 |

== Personnel ==
Credits adapted from the liner notes of Look Sharp!.

- Roxette are Per Gessle and Marie Fredriksson
- Recorded at EMI Studios, Stockholm, Sweden and Trident II Studios, London, England
- Remastered by Alar Suurna at Polar Studio, Stockholm (2009 reissue)
- All songs published by Jimmy Fun Music, except: "Dance Away", "Cry" and "Half a Woman, Half a Shadow" published by Shock the Music/Jimmy Fun Music

Musicians

- Marie Fredriksson – lead and background vocals, piano, keyboards, mixing
- Per Gessle – lead and background vocals, guitar, mixing
- Per "Pelle" Alsing – drums and hi-hat
- Erik Borelius – Spanish guitar
- Graham Edwards – bass guitar (tracks 6, 7 and 10)
- Erik Häusler – saxophone (track 3)
- Anders Herrlin – background vocals, bass guitar, engineering, programming
- Jonas Isacsson – electric and acoustic guitars
- Henrik Janson – talkbox (track 8)
- Jarl "Jalle" Lorensson – harmonica (track 8)
- Adam McCulloch – saxophone (tracks 6 and 10)
- Morris Michael – electric and acoustic guitars (tracks 6, 7 and 10)
- Adam Moseley – engineering, production (tracks 6, 7 and 10)
- Clarence Öfwerman – background vocals, keyboards, programming, production
- Jan "Janne" Oldaeus – slide guitar
- Alar Suurna – engineering, mixing
- Andrew Wright – keyboards, programming (tracks 6, 7 and 10)

Technical

- Julian Adair – production assistant (tracks 6, 7 and 10)
- Kjell Andersson – sleeve design, executive producer
- Carl Bengtsson – photography
- Lennart Haglund – engineering assistant
- Mikael Jansson – photography
- Rolf Nygren – executive producer
- Pär Wickholm – sleeve design

== Charts ==
=== Weekly charts ===
1988–1990 weekly chart performance for Look Sharp!
| Chart (1988–1990) | Peak; position |
|---|---|
| Australian Albums (ARIA) | 2 |
| Austrian Albums (Ö3 Austria) | 3 |
| Canada Top Albums/CDs (RPM) | 5 |
| Dutch Albums (Album Top 100) | 17 |
| European Albums (Music & Media) | 12 |
| Finnish Albums (Suomen virallinen lista) | 7 |
| German Albums (Offizielle Top 100) | 7 |
| Japanese Albums (Oricon) | 85 |
| New Zealand Albums (RMNZ) | 12 |
| Norwegian Albums (VG-lista) | 1 |
| Spanish Albums (AFYVE) | 6 |
| Swedish Albums (Sverigetopplistan) | 1 |
| Swiss Albums (Schweizer Hitparade) | 2 |
| UK Albums (Official Charts) | 4 |
| US Billboard 200 | 23 |

2020 weekly chart performance for Look Sharp!
| Chart (2020) | Peak; position |
|---|---|
| Hungarian Albums (MAHASZ) | 18 |

=== Year-end charts ===
1989 year-end chart performance for Look Sharp!
| Chart (1989) | Position |
|---|---|
| Australian Albums (ARIA) | 17 |
| Austrian Albums (Ö3 Austria) | 17 |
| Canada Top Albums/CDs (RPM) | 20 |
| German Albums (Offizielle Top 100) | 38 |
| Norwegian Russefeiring Period Albums (VG-lista) | 2 |
| Swiss Albums (Schweizer Hitparade) | 4 |
| US Billboard 200 | 81 |

1990 year-end chart performance for Look Sharp!
| Chart (1990) | Position |
|---|---|
| Australian Albums (ARIA) | 56 |
| Austrian Albums (Ö3 Austria) | 10 |
| Dutch Albums (Album Top 100) | 58 |
| European Albums (Music & Media) | 27 |
| German Albums (Offizielle Top 100) | 11 |
| New Zealand Albums (RMNZ) | 21 |
| UK Albums (OCC) | 34 |
| US Billboard 200 | 45 |

== Certifications and sales ==
Certifications and sales for Look Sharp!
| Region | Certification | Certified units/sales |
|---|---|---|
| Australia (ARIA) | 3× Platinum | 210,000^{^} |
| Austria (IFPI Austria) | 2× Platinum | 100,000^{*} |
| Canada (Music Canada) | 6× Platinum | 600,000^{^} |
| Chile | 2× Platinum | 50,000 |
| Denmark (IFPI Danmark) | Platinum | 80,000^{^} |
| Finland (Musiikkituottajat) | Platinum | 54,376 |
| Germany (BVMI) | 2× Platinum | 1,000,000^{^} |
| Indonesia | Gold | 25,000 |
| Malaysia | Gold | 15,000 |
| Mexico (AMPROFON) | Platinum | 250,000^{^} |
| Netherlands (NVPI) | 2× Platinum | 200,000^{^} |
| New Zealand (RMNZ) | 3× Platinum | 45,000^{^} |
| Norway (IFPI Norway) | Gold | 25,000^{*} |
| Singapore (RIAS) | Gold | 7,500^{*} |
| Spain (Promusicae) | Platinum | 100,000^{^} |
| Sweden (GLF) | 5× Platinum | 511,000 |
| Switzerland (IFPI Switzerland) | 2× Platinum | 100,000^{^} |
| United Kingdom (BPI) | Platinum | 300,000^{^} |
| United States (RIAA) | Platinum | 1,000,000^{^} |
Summaries
| Worldwide | — | 9,000,000 |
^{*} Sales figures based on certification alone.^{^} Shipments figures based on certification alone.
