= Dangerous (Roxette song) =

1988 song by Roxette

Single by Roxette

from the album Look Sharp!
- B-side: "Surrender" (live)
- Released: 10 May 1989
- Recorded: May 1988
- Studio: EMI (Stockholm, Sweden)
- Length: 3:46
- Label: EMI
- Songwriter: Per Gessle
- Producer: Clarence Öfwerman

Roxette singles chronology
"The Look" (1989)	"Dangerous" (1989)	"It Must Have Been Love" (1990)

Music video
- "Dangerous" on YouTube

"Dangerous" is a song by Swedish pop duo Roxette. Written by Per Gessle, the song was released as the fourth and final single from their second studio album, Look Sharp! (1988). Gessle penned it just before Roxette's first tour in 1987. Released in May 1989, it was the group's third top-10 single on the US Billboard Hot 100, reaching number two. It also entered the top 10 in Australia, Canada, and six European countries. The music video was recorded in the ruins of Borgholm Castle. In the UK and Ireland, "Dangerous" was released as a double A-side with "Listen to Your Heart".

== Critical reception ==
Bryan Buss from AllMusic described the song as "A/C-leaning". Bill Coleman from Billboard stated that this "undeniably infectious popper will no doubt keep the super-hot duo in heavy pop radio rotation well into the winter." Pan-European magazine Music & Media viewed the song as "another melodic, radio-friendly effort", that's "already doing well in the US."

== Music video ==
The accompanying music video for "Dangerous" was filmed during Roxette's concert at Borgholm Castle in Öland, Sweden, in July 1989. It is a mix of rehearsal and live performance footage from that show, and was directed by Doug Freel.

== Track listings ==
All songs were written and composed by Per Gessle except "Joy of a Toy", composed by Gessle and Mats Persson.

- 7-inch and cassette single (US 50233)
1. "Dangerous" (LP version) – 3:50
2. "Dangerous" (12-inch version) – 6:26
- 7-inch single (Germany 006-1363707 · Australia A-2358)
1. "Dangerous" (7-inch version) – 3:46
2. "Dangerous" (Waste of Vinyl 12-inch mix) – 6:26
3. "Surrender" (live) – 3:12
4. "Joy of a Toy" (live) – 4:10
- 7-inch single (Sweden 1363417)
1. "Dangerous" (7-inch version) – 3:46
2. "Surrender" (live) – 3:12
3. "Neverending Love" (live) – 3:20
- US 12-inch single (US V-56159)
1. "Dangerous" (Power Mix – long) – 7:02
2. "Dangerous" (Power Mix – short) – 3:39
3. "Dangerous" (dub) – 3:50
4. "I Could Never (Give You Up)" – 3:49
- CD single (Sweden 1363412)
1. "Dangerous" (7-inch version) – 3:46
2. "Dangerous" (Waste of Vinyl 12-inch mix) – 6:26
3. "Surrender" (live) – 3:12
4. "Neverending Love" (live) – 3:20
5. "Joy of a Toy" (live) – 4:10
6. "Sleeping Single" (live) – 4:15
- UK and Ireland CD single (CDEM149)
1. "Listen to Your Heart" (Swedish single version) – 5:12
2. "Dangerous" – 3:46
3. "Listen to Your Heart" (U.S. mix) – 4:53
4. "Dangerous" (U.S. club edit) – 3:46

== Credits ==
Credits are adapted from the liner notes of The Rox Box/Roxette 86–06.

Studio

- Recorded in May 1988 at EMI Studios (Stockholm, Sweden)
- Mixed at EMI Studios (Stockholm, Sweden)

Musicians

- Marie Fredriksson – lead and background vocals
- Per Gessle – lead and background vocals, mixing
- Anders Herrlin – background vocals, programming and engineering
- Jonas Isacsson – electric and acoustic guitars
- Henrik Janson – talkbox
- Jarl "Jalle" Lorensson – harmonica
- Clarence Öfwerman – keyboards, programming, production, mixing
- Jan "Janne" Oldaeus – slide guitar
- Alar Suurna – mixing, engineering

== Charts ==
=== Weekly charts ===
Chart (1989–1990)	Peak position
Australia (ARIA)	9
Austria (Ö3 Austria Top 40)	8
Belgium (Ultratop 50 Flanders)	21
Canada Top Singles (RPM)	2
Denmark (IFPI)	2
Europe (Eurochart Hot 100)	33
Ireland (IRMA) with "Listen to Your Heart"	5
Italy (Musica e dischi)	22
Netherlands (Dutch Top 40)	17
Netherlands (Single Top 100)	12
New Zealand (Recorded Music NZ)	12
Spain (AFYVE)	23
Sweden (Sverigetopplistan)	9
Switzerland (Schweizer Hitparade)	10
UK Singles (Official Charts) with "Listen to Your Heart"	6
US Billboard Hot 100	2
US Adult Contemporary (Billboard)	21
US Cash Box Top 100	1
West Germany (GfK)	8

=== Year-end charts ===
Chart (1990)	Position
Australia (ARIA)	39
Canada Top Singles (RPM)	33
Germany (Media Control)	50
Netherlands (Single Top 100)	77
US Billboard Hot 100	34
US Cash Box Top 100	32

== Certifications ==
Region	Certification	Certified units/sales
Australia (ARIA)	Gold	35,000^{^}
Sweden (GLF)	Gold	25,000^{^}
^{^} Shipments figures based on certification alone.

== Release history ==
Region	Date	Ref.
Sweden	10 May 1989	
Australia	29 January 1990	
West Germany	19 February 1990	
US and Canada	25 February 1990	
UK and Ireland	4 August 1990	
