= Soul Deep (Roxette song) =

Single by Roxette

from the album Pearls of Passion
- B-side: "Pearls of Passion"
- Released: 17 February 1987
- Recorded: September 1986
- Studio: EMI Studios, Stockholm
- Genre: Pop
- Length: 3:52
- Label: EMI
- Songwriter(s): Per Gessle
- Producer(s): Clarence Öfwerman

Roxette singles chronology
"Goodbye to You" (1986)	"Soul Deep" (1987)	"I Want You" (1987)

Music video
- "Soul Deep" on YouTube

"Soul Deep" is a song by Swedish pop music duo Roxette, released on 17 February 1987 by EMI as the third single from their debut album, Pearls of Passion (1986). The song was originally written in Swedish by Per Gessle, and was called "Dansar nerför ditt stup i rekordfart" ("Dancing Down Your Dive at Record Speed"), although Gessle later wrote new English lyrics for the song after deciding its Swedish lyrics were "too silly". The single was only released in Sweden, Germany and Canada. It spent three consecutive weeks at number 18 on the Swedish Singles Chart, but failed to chart in the other two countries.

The song was backed by the previously unreleased title track from their debut album, which would later see a wider release as the b-side to their 1992 single "Queen of Rain", and also as a bonus track on the 1997 reissue of Pearls of Passion. 12" editions of the single contain an extended mix of the a-side. This remix was created by Kaj Erixon and can also be found on the remix compilation Dance Passion, released in March 1987. A re-arranged and remixed version of "Soul Deep" later appeared on the duo's 1991 album Joyride.

== Formats and track listings ==
All music and lyrics written by Per Gessle.

- 7" Single (Germany / Sweden 1362557 · Canada B-73032)
1. "Soul Deep" (7" Remix) – 3:52
2. "Pearls of Passion" – 3:33
- 12" Single (Germany 1362626)
1. "Soul Deep" (Extended Mix) – 5:17
2. "Pearls of Passion" – 3:33
- Promo 12" Single (Sweden PRO-4077 · Canada SPRO-336)
1. "Soul Deep" (Extended Mix) – 5:17
2. "Soul Deep" (7" Remix) – 3:52

== Personnel ==
Credits adapted from the liner notes of The Rox Box/Roxette 86–06.

- Recorded at EMI Studios in Stockholm, Sweden in September 1986.

Musicians

- Marie Fredriksson – lead and background vocals
- Per Gessle – background vocals
- Per "Pelle" Alsing – drums
- Tommy Cassemar – bass guitar
- Marianne Flynner – background vocals
- Uno Forsberg – trumpet
- Jonas Isacsson – electric guitar
- Clarence Öfwerman – keyboards and production
- Mats Persson – percussion
- Mikael Renlinden – trumpet
- Anne-Lie Rydé – background vocals
- Tomas Sjörgen – trumpet
- Alar Suurna – engineering and mixing

== Charts ==
Chart (1987)	Peak position
Sweden (Sverigetopplistan)	18
