= Marianne Flynner =

Swedish singer

- Born: 16 September 1954 (age 71); Stockholm, Sweden
- Genres: country folk rock
- Occupation: singer
- Years active: 1970s-

Marianne Flynner (born 16 September 1954) is a Swedish singer.

During the 1980s she travelled with Rocktåget, and sung as a backup-choir girl with among others, Roxette and Eva Dahlgren.

For eight years, she lived in California, before studying at Adolf Fredrik's Music School.

in the United States, she was influenced by country music. By late 1993, Country Girl came out and her first album with own songs, and it peaked at 47th position at the Swedish album chart. In 1994 came her second album, Tic-Tac Time, and in 1996 came her third, Sagt och gjort. The albums consisted of acoustic, country-influenced, folk rock.

In 1984, Agnetha Fältskog recorded her composition "Eyes of a Woman". This became the title track of Agnetha's second English solo studio album, released in 1985. The album peaked at No. 2 in the Swedish charts and No. 38 in the UK charts.

In 1995 she scored a hit together with Susanne Alfvengren and Åsa Jinder performing the Swedish women's national team fight song "Det är nu!" during the 1995 FIFA Women's World Cup, which was played in Sweden.

On 4 January 1997, her song "Den sista december" received a Svensktoppen test, but failed to enter chart.

Another famous song is "Hennes ögon" from 1996, written by Lotta Ahlin, and recorded by, among others, Jill Johnson in 1998.

== Discography ==
=== Albums ===
- Country Girl – 1993
- Tic-Tac Time – 1994
- Sagt och gjort – 1996
