= Neverending Love =

Single by Roxette

from the album Pearls of Passion
- B-side: "Voices"
- Released: 8 July 1986
- Recorded: March–April 1986
- Studio: EMI Studios, Stockholm
- Genre: Pop
- Length: 3:29
- Label: EMI
- Songwriter(s): Per Gessle
- Producer(s): Clarence Öfwerman

Roxette singles chronology
"Neverending Love" (1986)	"Goodbye to You" (1986)

Alternative cover
- French 7" cover

Music video
- "Neverending Love" on YouTube

"Neverending Love" is a song by Swedish pop music duo Roxette, released on 8 July 1986 by EMI as their debut single. The track was originally written in Swedish by Per Gessle, as "Svarta glas" ("Black Glass"), for recording artist Pernilla Wahlgren, who turned it down. However, she offered the song to her brother Niclas Wahlgren, who recorded his own version. The release of his single was cancelled at the request of EMI, when Gessle recorded an English version of the song with Marie Fredriksson.

The single was originally intended to only be released outside of Sweden, as EMI believed it would interfere with Fredriksson's burgeoning solo career. The label eventually changed their minds, and the single went on to peak at number three on the Swedish Singles Chart. The song was later included on the duo's debut album, Pearls of Passion (1986). Two music videos were created for the song. The first was shot in Luxembourg in 1986 and features a red-haired Fredriksson. The second was directed by Rikard Petrelius and was shot one year later in Sweden.

== Formats and track listings ==
All lyrics by Per Gessle; all music by Gessle except "Voices", by Marie Fredriksson and Per Andersson.

- 7" single (Germany / Italy / Sweden 1362277)
1. "Neverending Love" – 3:29
2. "Neverending Love" (Love Mix) – 3:59
- French 7" / Swedish 12" single (France 1362567 · Sweden 1362486)
1. "Neverending Love" – 3:29
2. "Voices" – 4:05
- German 12" single (136237)
1. "Neverending Love" (12" Mix) – 5:14
2. "Neverending Love" (7" Mix) – 3:18
3. "Voices" – 4:05
- French 12" single (1362576)
1. "Neverending Love" (Love Mix) – 3:59
2. "Neverending Love" – 3:29
3. "Neverending Love" (Extended Club Mix) – 4:31

== Personnel ==
Credits adapted from the liner notes of The Rox Box/Roxette 86–06.

- Recorded at EMI Studios in Stockholm, Sweden in March and April 1986.

Musicians

- Marie Fredriksson – lead and background vocals
- Per Gessle – lead and background vocals
- Björn Boström – engineering
- Tommy Cassemar – bass guitar
- Clarence Öfwerman – keyboards and production
- Mats "MP" Persson – electric guitar
- Alar Suurna – mixing
- Tim Werner – drums

== Charts and sales ==
Chart (1986)	Peak position
Sweden (Sverigetopplistan)	3

Region	Certification	Certified units/sales
Sweden	—	50,000
