= Dressed for Success =

1988 song by Roxette

- Swedish single cover

Single by Roxette

from the album Look Sharp!
- B-side: "The Voice"
- Released: 3 August 1988
- Recorded: May–June 1988
- Studio: EMI (Stockholm, Sweden)
- Genre: Synth-rock
- Length: 4:09
- Label: EMI
- Songwriter: Per Gessle
- Producer: Clarence Öfwerman

Roxette singles chronology
"I Call Your Name" (1988)	"Dressed for Success" (1988)	"Listen to Your Heart" (1988)

Music video
- "Dressed for Success" on YouTube

Alternative cover
- International cover

"Dressed for Success" is a song by Swedish pop rock duo Roxette, released in Europe on 3 August 1988 as the lead single from their second studio album, Look Sharp! (1988). Following the international success of "The Look" – the album's third single in their home country, but the first to be released outside of Sweden – "Dressed for Success" was re-issued internationally in 1989 and became a worldwide hit, most notably in Australia, where it peaked at number three and was certified platinum by Australian Recording Industry Association (ARIA).

== Recording ==
The recording of the song was marked by a dispute between the band members, but this apparently contributed to the strength of Marie's performance.

"I was so mad when I did it. Everything about that session went wrong, we argued about the arrangement, we changed the key, I was dead tired of the song when I went in to do a guide vocal. Did it in one blast and suddenly realized, 'hmm... this is it'."

— Marie Fredriksson, Don't Bore Us, Get to the Chorus! liner notes.

== Critical reception ==
In an ironic review of 15 July 1989 the Johnny Dee, observer of British music newspaper Record Mirror, placed it into "thumbs-down section" but expressed regret by saying that "isn't all that bad". As per him song has "a nifty beat". Bryan Buss from AllMusic described the song as "punchy" and "hopeful". Music & Media commented, "Another relentless pop song from the Swedish duo. Reminiscent of The Look but this time the emphasis is more on Marie Frederiksson's vocals".

== Music video ==
The music video for the song mostly revolves around the duo performing together in "nightclub ruins" (similar to those featured in their previous video, "The Look", also directed by Peter Heath) as several dancers and groups of party-goers sway to the song.

== Formats and track listings ==
All songs were written and composed by Per Gessle.

- US 7-inch and cassette single (50204; 4JM-50204)
1. "Dressed for Success" – 4:19
2. "The Look" (album version) – 4:11
- Swedish and UK 7-inch single (1363207; EM96)
- UK cassette single (TCEM96)
1. "Dressed for Success" – 4:19
2. "The Voice" – 4:16
- Swedish 12-inch single (1363216)
1. "Dressed for Success" (The Look Sharp! remix) – 7:50
2. "Dressed for Success" (instrumental) – 4:13
3. "Dressed for Success" (7-inch version) – 4:13
4. "The Voice" – 4:16
- UK 12-inch single (12EM96)
1. "Dressed for Success" (remix) – 6:30
2. "The Look" (Big Red mix) – 7:32
3. "The Voice" – 4:16
- US CD single (DPRO-04295)
1. "Dressed for Success" (7-inch version) – 4:16
2. "Dressed for Success" (Look Sharp! mix) – 4:52
- UK CD single (CDEM96)
1. "Dressed for Success" (7-inch version) – 4:13
2. "The Look" (7-inch version) – 3:57
3. "Dressed for Success" (remix) – 6:30
4. "The Voice" – 4:16

== Credits and personnel ==
Credits are adapted from the liner notes of The Rox Box/Roxette 86–06.

- Recorded between May and June 1988 at EMI Studios, Stockholm, Sweden
- Mixed at EMI Studios, Stockholm
- Single version mixed at The Grey Room, Los Angeles

Musicians

- Marie Fredriksson – lead and background vocals
- Per Gessle – lead and background vocals, mixing
- Anders Herrlin – programming, engineering
- Jonas Isacsson – electric and acoustic guitars
- Clarence Öfwerman – keyboards, programming, production, mixing
- Alar Suurna – mixing, engineering
- Chris Lord-Alge – mixing (single version)

== Charts ==
=== Weekly charts ===
Chart (1988–1990)	Peak position
Australia (ARIA)	3
Austria (Ö3 Austria Top 40)	6
Belgium (Ultratop 50 Flanders)	23
Canada Top Singles (RPM)	10
Europe (Eurochart Hot 100)	34
Ireland (IRMA)	14
Luxembourg (Radio Luxembourg)	15
New Zealand (Recorded Music NZ)	36
Spain (AFYVE)	12
Sweden (Sverigetopplistan)	2
Switzerland (Schweizer Hitparade)	4
UK Singles (Official Charts)	18
UK Airplay (Music Week)	6
US Billboard Hot 100	14
US Cash Box Top 100	14
US Top 40 (Gavin Report)	12
US Contemporary Hit Radio (Radio & Records)	16
West Germany (GfK)	16

=== Year-end charts ===
Chart (1989)	Position
Australia (ARIA)	20
Canada Top Singles (RPM)	91
Switzerland (Schweizer Hitparade)	29

== Certifications ==
Region	Certification	Certified units/sales
Australia (ARIA)	Platinum	70,000^{^}
Canada (Music Canada)	Gold	50,000^{^}
Sweden (GLF)	Gold	25,000^{^}
^{^} Shipments figures based on certification alone.

== Release history ==
Region	Date	Format(s)	Label(s)	Ref.
Sweden	3 August 1988	7-inch vinyl; 12-inch vinyl	EMI	
United Kingdom	3 July 1989	7-inch vinyl; 12-inch vinyl; CD; cassette	EMI	
Japan	19 July 1989	Mini-CD	EMI	
United Kingdom (re-release)	15 October 1990	7-inch vinyl; 12-inch vinyl; CD; cassette	EMI	
