= Per Gessle discography =

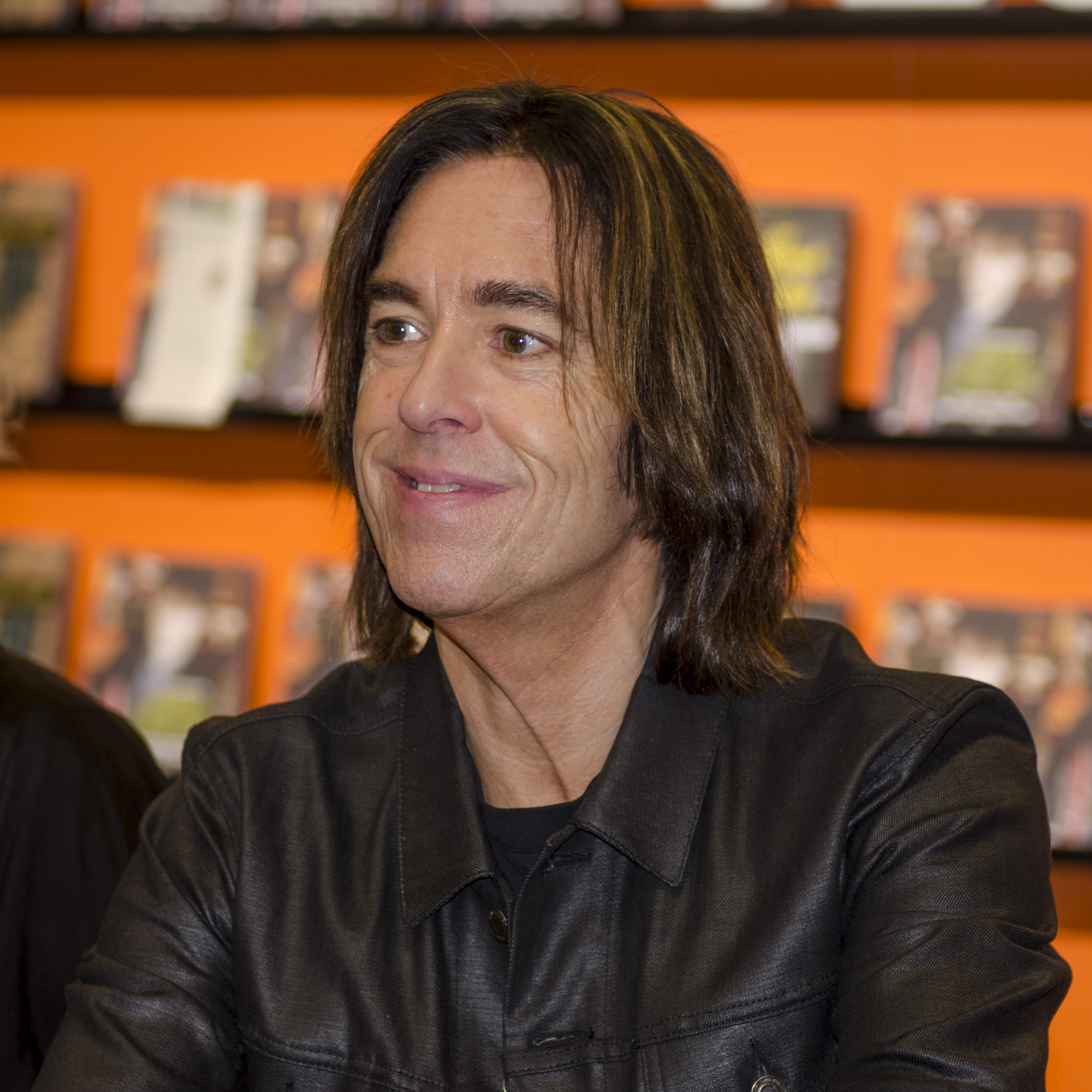
- Gessle in 2014
- Studio albums: 14
- Soundtrack albums: 1
- Live albums: 4
- Compilation albums: 3
- Singles: 53
- Video albums: 3
- Collaborative albums: 1
- Box sets: 3
- Demo albums: 6
- EPs: 2

Swedish singer-songwriter Per Gessle has released fourteen studio albums (including one as Son of a Plumber, one as Mono Mind, and one as PG Roxette), four live albums, three compilation albums, one collaborative album, three box sets, six demo albums, one soundtrack album, two EPs and three video albums. He also released 53 singles, including two as a featured artist, one as Peter Pop and the Helicopters, one as Rita & the Rip-Off!, eight as Mono Mind and seven as PG Roxette.

Best known internationally as the main songwriter and co-lead vocalist of Swedish pop music duo Roxette, Gessle was originally the lead vocalist and guitarist of Swedish pop rock band Gyllene Tider, who released three studio albums from 1980 to 1982. His debut solo album, Per Gessle, was released in 1983 and peaked within the top five of Swedish Albums Chart. This was followed in 1985 by Scener, which under-performed commercially, selling approximately 20,000 copies in Sweden. Gessle later revealed he was at risk of being dropped by EMI as a result of the commercial performance of Scener.

The following year, Gessle formed Roxette with Swedish vocalist Marie Fredriksson, and achieved substantial international success over the next decade. Roxette have sold an estimated 75-80 million records worldwide, and had four number ones on the Billboard Hot 100. Roxette's commercial breakthrough coincided with a period of solo inactivity for Gessle, eventually releasing his third solo album, The World According to Gessle, in 1997. Gessle resumed solo activity following Fredriksson's brain tumour diagnosis in 2002, releasing his most successful solo record, Mazarin, in 2003. The album was certified quintuple platinum in Sweden, where lead single "Här kommer alla känslorna (på en och samma gång)" spent eight weeks at number one. En händig man and Party Crasher were released in 2007 and 2008 respectively, and were both preceded by number one singles in Sweden.

Gessle resumed solo activity following Fredriksson's retirement from touring in 2016, releasing En vacker natt and En vacker dag in 2017, Small Town Talk in 2018, Gammal kärlek rostar aldrig in 2020 and Sällskapssjuk in 2024. He has also released music under the aliases Son of a Plumber, Mono Mind, and PG Roxette, with the latter being a continuation of Roxette following Fredriksson's death in 2019.

== Studio albums ==
List of studio albums, with selected chart positions, sales figures and certifications
Title	Album details	Peak chart positions					Certifications
Title	Album details	SWE	BEL	GER	NOR	SWI	Certifications
Per Gessle	Released: 8 April 1983; Label: EMI; Formats: Cassette · LP	5	—	—	—	—	
Scener	Released: 25 October 1985; Label: EMI; Formats: Cassette · LP	39	—	—	—	—	
The World According to Gessle	Released: 2 May 1997; Label: Fundamental Records · EMI; Formats: CD · cassette	1	45	—	35	—	GLF: Gold
Mazarin	Released: 16 June 2003; Label: Capitol · Cosmos Music; Formats: CD · LP · digital download	1	—	—	6	—	GLF: 5× Platinum
Son of a Plumber (Note: Son of a Plumber was originally released under the pseudonym Son of a Plumber. Subsequent digital reissues include Gessle's name on the album cover, and it appears as part of his solo discography on services including Apple Music and Amazon.)	Released: 23 November 2005; Label: Elevator Entertainment · Capitol; Formats: CD · LP · digital download	1	—	—	—	—	GLF: Platinum
En händig man	Released: 13 June 2007; Label: Elevator Entertainment · Capitol; Formats: CD · LP · digital download	1	—	—	36	—	GLF: 3× Platinum
Party Crasher	Released: 26 November 2008; Label: Elevator Entertainment · Capitol; Formats: CD · LP · digital download	2	—	—	—	—	GLF: Platinum
En vacker natt	Released: 28 April 2017; Label: Space Station 12 · BMG; Formats: CD · LP · digital download	1	—	—	—	—	GLF: Gold
En vacker dag	Released: 22 September 2017; Label: Space Station 12 · BMG; Formats: CD · LP · digital download	2	—	—	—	—	
Small Town Talk	Released: 7 September 2018; Label: Elevator Entertainment · BMG; Formats: CD · LP · digital download	5	—	92	—	63	
Gammal kärlek rostar aldrig	Released: 6 November 2020; Label: Elevator Entertainment · Cosmos Music; Formats: CD · LP · digital download	1	—	—	—	—	
Sällskapssjuk	Released: 25 October 2024; Label: Elevator Entertainment; Formats: CD · LP · digital download	1	—	—	—	—	
"—" denotes a release that did not chart or was not released in that territory.

=== Mono Mind ===
List of albums released as Mono Mind, with additional information
Title	Album details	Further information
Mind Control	Released: 11 January 2019; Label: Elevator Entertainment · BMG; Formats: CD · LP · digital download	Mono Mind is a pseudonymous electronic musical group consisting of Gessle as "Dr. Robot", Helena Josefsson as "Cookie Carter", Christoffer Lundquist as "Bright Jones" and Clarence Öfwerman as "Rain Davis", as well as other collaborators including David Guetta.

=== PG Roxette ===
List of albums released as PG Roxette, with selected chart positions
Title	Album details	Peak chart positions				Certifications
Title	Album details	SWE	GER	SPA	UK Album Sales	Certifications
Pop-Up Dynamo!	Released: 28 October 2022; Label: Elevator Entertainment · Parlophone; Formats: CD · LP · digital download	2	37	100	72	

== Live albums ==
List of live albums, with selected chart positions
Title	Album details	Peak chart positions	Certifications
Title	Album details	SWE	Certifications
Gessle Over Europe	Released: 23 October 2009; Label: Elevator Entertainment · Capitol; Formats: CD · LP · digital download	24	
En vacker kväll – Live sommaren 2017	Released: 8 December 2018; Label: Space Station 12 · BMG; Formats: CD · digital download	10	
Late Night Concert – Unplugged Cirkus	Released: 29 January 2021; Label: Elevator Entertainment; Formats: CD · LP · digital download	8	
En akustisk kväll med Per Gessle	Released: 5 August 2022; Label: Elevator Entertainment; Formats: Digital download	—	
"—" denotes a release that did not chart.

== Compilations ==
List of compilation albums, with selected chart positions and certifications
Title	Album details	Peak chart positions	Certifications
Title	Album details	SWE	Certifications
Hjärtats trakt	Released: 20 April 1993; Label: Pickwick Records; Formats: CD · Cassette	—	
Hjärtats trakt – en samling	Released: 10 September 1997; Label: EMI; Formats: CD	—	
Kung av sand – en liten samling 1983–2007	Released: 30 August 2007; Label: Elevator Entertainment · Capitol; Formats: CD	—	GLF: Platinum
"—" denotes a release that did not chart or was not eligible to chart in that territory.

== Box sets ==
List of box sets, with selected chart positions
Title	Album details	Peak chart positions	Notes
Title	Album details	SWE	Notes
På väg, 1982–86	Released: 1 July 1992; Label: EMI; Formats: CD	—	3 CD box set, containing Gessle's first two solo albums with bonus tracks and a bonus disc of demos.
Original album serien	Released: 17 August 2011; Label: EMI · Capitol; Formats: CD · digital download	50	5 CD box set, containing Gessle's first five solo albums with bonus tracks.
The Per Gessle Archives (A Lifetime of Songwriting)	Released: 24 September 2014; Label: Elevator Entertainment; Formats: CD · LP · digital download	7	11-disc box set, containing 10 CDs and 1 vinyl of previously unreleased demos.
"—" denotes a release that did not chart.

== Collaborative albums ==
List of collaborative albums, with additional information
Title	Album details	Further information
The Lonely Boys	Released: 1995; Label: EMI · Parlophone; Formats: CD · LP	A collaborative album recorded with Nisse Hellberg. The two were approached by author Mats Olsson to create the soundtrack to Olsson's novel The Lonely Boys, about a fictional 1960s Swedish band. The album was recorded with members of Gessle's band Gyllene Tider and Hellberg's band Wilmer X.

== Demo albums ==
List of demo albums, with additional information
Title	Album details	Notes
Att vara Per Gessle - Doppade bara tårna - Demos 1977-90	Released: 30 October 2007; Label: Albert Bonniers Förlag; Formats: CD	9-track CD of demos, released with deluxe editions of Gessle's 2007 autobiography Att vara Per Gessle.
The Per Gessle Archives - Samma skrot och demos	Released: 11 January 2020; Label: Elevator Entertainment; Formats: Digital download	Demos from Gyllene Tider's 2019 album Samma skrot och korn.
The Per Gessle Archives - På väg - Demos 1982-86	Released: 15 May 2020; Label: Elevator Entertainment; Formats: Digital download	Digital reissue of the Pa vag box set.
The Per Gessle Archives - Finn fem fel! demos	Released: 21 December 2021; Label: Elevator Entertainment; Formats: Digital download	Demos from Gyllene Tider's 2004 album Finn 5 fel!.
The Per Gessle Archives – 20 Vackra Demos	Released: 12 January 2022; Label: Elevator Entertainment; Formats: Digital download	Demos from Gessle's 2017 albums En vacker natt and En vacker dag, with five previously unreleased bonus tracks.
The Per Gessle Archives - Dags att tänka på refrängen demos	Released: 15 April 2022; Label: Elevator Entertainment; Formats: Digital download	Demos from Gyllene Tider's 2013 album Dags att tänka på refrängen.

== Soundtrack albums ==
List of box sets, with selected chart positions
Title	Album details	Peak chart positions
Title	Album details	SWE
Small Apartments (The Motion Picture Soundtrack)	Released: 17 April 2013; Label: Capitol · Parlophone; Formats: CD · LP	37

== Extended plays ==
List of EPs, with additional information
Title	Album details
Tylösand 2021 EP	Released: 5 November 2021; Label: Elevator Entertainment; Formats: Digital download
Incognito (as PG Roxette)	Released: 28 April 2023; Label: Elevator Entertainment · Parlophone; Format: 7" · digital download

== Singles ==
Title	Year	Peak chart positions						Certifications	Album
Title	Year	SWE	SWE Airplay	SWE DL	BEL	ICE	NLD	Certifications	Album
"Om du har lust"	1983	—	— (Note: "Om du har lust" did not enter the Svensktoppen Chart, but entered the national Poporama chart.)	—	—	—	—		Per Gessle
"Blå december"	1984	— (Note: "Blå december" did not enter the Swedish Singles Chart, but peaked at number fourteen on the Sverigetopplistan Tracks chart.)	—	—	—	—	—		Scener
"Galning"	1985	— (Note: "Galning" did not enter the Swedish Singles Chart, but peaked at number eighteen on the Sverigetopplistan Tracks chart.)	5	—	—	—	—		Scener
"Inte tillsammans, inte isär"	1986	—	—	—	—	—	—		Scener
"Do You Wanna Be My Baby?"	1997	1	—	—	46	32	—	GLF: Gold	The World According to Gessle
"Kix"	1997	28	—	—	—	—	—		The World According to Gessle
"I Want You to Know"	1997	48	—	—	—	—	—		The World According to Gessle
"I Wanna Be Your Boyfriend"	2002	44	—	—	—	—	—		The Song Ramones the Same
Här kommer alla känslorna (på en och samma gång)"	2003	1	1	—	—	—	—	GLF: Platinum	Mazarin
"På promenad genom stan"	2003	20	5	—	—	—	—		Mazarin
"Tycker om när du tar på mej"	2003	9	2	—	—	—	—		Mazarin
"C'mon"/"Jo-Anna Says"	2005	5	—	—	—	—	—		Son of a Plumber
"Hey Mr. DJ (Won't You Play Another Love Song)"	2006	23	—	—	—	—	98		Son of a Plumber
"I Like it Like That"	2006	47	—	—	—	—	—		Son of a Plumber
"En händig man"	2007	1	7	5	—	—	—		En händig man
"Jag skulle vilja tänka en underbar tanke"	2007	29	6	24	—	—	—		En händig man
"Pratar med min müsli (hur det än verkar)"	2007	47	—	—	—	—	—		En händig man
"Silly Really"	2008	1	5	1	—	—	—		Party Crasher
"I Didn't Mean to Turn You On"	2008	47	—	42	—	—	—		Party Crasher
"Sing Along"	2009	41	—	—	—	—	—		Party Crasher
"Kvar i min bil"	2014	—	—	—	—	—	—		The Per Gessle Archives
"Småstadsprat" (with Lars Winnerbäck)	2017	72	—	—	—	—	—	GLF: Gold	En vacker natt
"Tittar på dej när du dansar"	2017	—	—	—	—	—	—		En vacker natt
"Känn dej som hemma"	2017	—	—	—	—	—	—		En vacker dag
"Name You Beautiful" (with Helena Josefsson)	2018	— (Note: "Name You Beautiful" did not enter the Swedish Singellista Chart, but peaked at number 10 on the Swedish Heatseeker Chart.)	—	—	—	—	—		Small Town Talk
"The Finest Prize" (with Helena Josefsson)	2018	—	—	—	—	—	—		Small Town Talk
"Being With You"	2018	—	—	—	—	—	—		Small Town Talk
"Honung och guld" (Live with Lars Winnerbäck)	2018	—	—	—	—	—	—		Non-album singles
"Around the Corner (The Comfort Song)" (with Helena Josefsson)	2020	—	—	—	—	—	—		Non-album singles
"Mamma"/"Pappa" (with Helena Josefsson)	2020	—	—	—	—	—	—		Gammal kärlek rostar aldrig
"It Must Have Been Love" (Live with Agnes)	2020	—	—	—	—	—	—		Non-album single
"Nypon och ljung"	2020	—	—	—	—	—	—		Gammal kärlek rostar aldrig
"Ömhet" (with Helena Josefsson)	2020	—	—	—	—	—	—		Gammal kärlek rostar aldrig
"Bara få höra din röst" (with Uno Svenningsson)	2022	—	—	—	—	—	—		Sällskapssjuk
"Beredd" (with Molly Hammar)	2024	— (Note: "Beredd" did not enter the Swedish Singellista Chart, but peaked at number six on the Swedish Heatseeker Chart.)	—	—	—	—	—		Sällskapssjuk
"Sällskapssjuk" (with Lena Philipsson)	2024	— (Note: "Sällskapssjuk" did not enter the Swedish Singellista Chart, but peaked at number nine on the Swedish Heatseeker Chart.)	—	—	—	—	—		Sällskapssjuk
"—" denotes a release that did not chart or was not released in that territory.

=== As featured artist ===
Title	Year	Peak chart positions	Album
Title	Year	SWE	Album
"På väg" (Niklas Strömstedt feat. Per Gessle)	1990	—	En gång i livet
"You Don't Want Love" (Heikki L feat. Per Gessle)	2014	—	Non-album single

=== Airplay-only singles ===
Title	Year	Peak chart positions	Album
Title	Year	SWE Airplay	Album
"Mandolindagar"	1986	10	Non-album single
"The Party Pleaser"	2009	9	Party Crasher

=== Other charted songs ===
Title	Year	Peak chart positions	Album
Title	Year	SWE DL	Album
"Vet du vad jag egentligen vill?"	2007	21	"En händig man"

=== Mono Mind ===
Title	Year	Peak chart positions						Album
Title	Year	BEL Dance	BEL Ultratip	FRA Radio	US Dance	US Dance Airplay	US EDM Digital	Album
"Sugar Rush"	2016	—	—	—	—	—	—	Mind Control
"Save Me a Place" (Bridge & Mountain Mix)	2017	—	—	—	—	2	19	Mind Control
"Save Me a Place" (Hugel Mix)	2017	13	41	8	—	—	—	Save Me a Place: The Remixes
"I Found My Soul at Marvingate"	2018	—	—	—	—	—	—	Mind Control
"LaLaLove"	2018	—	—	—	21	—	—	Mind Control
"Down By the Riverside" (DJ Antonio Remix)	2019	—	—	—	—	—	—	non-album singles
"Fighting for the Future"	2020	—	—	—	—	—	—	non-album singles
"All Over Your Body"	2021	—	—	—	—	—	—	non-album singles
"—" denotes a release that did not chart or was not released in that territory.

=== PG Roxette ===
Title	Year	Peak chart positions	Album
Title	Year	SWE DL	Album
"Nothing Else Matters"	2021	—	The Metallica Blacklist
"The Loneliest Girl in the World"	2022	—	Pop-Up Dynamo!
"Walking on Air"	2022	—	Pop-Up Dynamo!
"My Chosen One" (with Léon)	2022	—	Pop-Up Dynamo!
"Wish You the Best for Xmas"	2022	50	non-album single
"Headphones On"	2023	—	Pop-Up Dynamo!
"The Craziest Thing" (Lost Boys Remix)	2023	—	Pop-Up Dynamo!
"—" denotes a release that did not chart in that territory.

=== Other aliases ===
Gessle has released music under numerous other aliases. His band Gyllene Tider recorded several songs under the name Pers Garage, a name the band utilised when bassist Anders Herrlin was unable to record. Six of these songs were included on Gyllene Tider's 1989 compilation Instant Hits!. Gessle and his Gyllene Tider band-mate Mats "MP" Persson recorded several songs under the name Grape Rock, a duo that was active from 1977 to early 1978. Two songs recorded by Grape Rock – "Saken slår mig som på huvudet" and "En av dom där" – were released on Gyllene Tider's 1989 limited edition compilation album Jag har förstått allt, men jag kan inte ge några detalje. Gessle and Persson were also the only members of Peter Pop and the Helicopters. Their only release, the double A-side single "After School" / "Keep My Love Satisfied", was issued on 4 February 1980 by KAP Records. The two were joined by Tider drummer Micke "Syd" Andersson in 1982 for the release of the single "Dansa Pop Pop", which was issued under the name Rita & The Rip-Off!. He was a member of Rockfile; their song "Marie i växeln" appeared on Tider's 2004 compilation GT 25 – Samtliga hits!. He was also credited as Thomas Nyberg on The Lonely Boys album.

== Videography ==
=== Video albums ===
List of video albums, with selected chart positions and certifications
Title	Album details	Peak chart positions	Sales and certifications
Title	Album details	SWE	Sales and certifications
En mazarin, älskling?	Released: 27 November 2003; Label: Elevator Entertainment · Capitol; Formats: DVD · VHS	2	GLF: Platinum
En händig man på turné	Released: 5 December 2007; Label: Elevator Entertainment · Capitol; Formats: DVD	1	
En vacker kväll	Released: 25 June 2018; Label: Elevator Entertainment; Formats: DVD	2	
