= Kung av sand – en liten samling 1983–2007 =

Kung av sand - en liten samling 1983–2007

Compilation album by Per Gessle
- Released: 30 August 2007
- Recorded: 1983–2007
- Genres: Pop rock, soft rock
- Label: EMI

Per Gessle chronology
En händig man (2007)	Kung av sand - en liten samling 1983–2007 (2007)	Party Crasher (2008)

Kung av sand - en liten samling 1983–2007 was released on 30 August 2007 through Aftonbladet and is a compilation album from Swedish pop artist Per Gessle.

== Track listing ==
1. "Kung av sand" (Live from Mazarin)
2. "På promenad genom stan" (Live from Mazarin)
3. "Inte tillsammans, inte isär" (demo 28 June 2003)
4. "Hon vill sväva över ängarna" (from En händig E.P.)
5. "Tända en sticka till" (from the album Per Gessle)
6. "Flickan i en Cole Porter-sång" (Live from Mazarin)
7. "Ingen kan som du" (demo 28 May 2003; new track)
8. "Småstad" (Live from Mazarin)
9. "Segla på ett moln" (with Marie Fredriksson; from Demos)
10. "Blå december" (from Scener)

== Certifications ==
Provider	Certification
IFPI Sweden	Platinum
