= Hjärtats trakt =

Compilation album by Per Gessle
- Released: 20 April 1993
- Recorded: 1983–1985
- Genre: Pop
- Label: Pickwick

Per Gessle chronology
På väg, 1982-86 (1992)	Hjärtats trakt (1993)	The World According to Gessle (1997)

Hjärtats trakt was released on 20 April 1993 and is a compilation album from Swedish pop artist Per Gessle. The album includes songs taken from Gessle's solo albums Per Gessle and Scener. It was also released under license by the British record company Pickwick and it is the only Gessle album released by another label than EMI. In 1998 the album was re-released by the Dutch record company Disky Communications B.V. which is a subsidiary of EMI.

== Track listing ==
1. "Hjärtats trakt"
2. "Om du har lust"
3. "Rädd"
4. "Regn"
5. "Fiskarnas tecken"
6. "Syrenernas tid"
7. "Speedo"
8. "Viskar"
9. "Inte tillsammans, inte isär"
10. "Om jag en dag"
11. "Mandolindagar"
12. "Väntat så länge"
