= Real Sugar =

Single by Roxette

from the album Room Service
- Released: 18 June 2001
- Recorded: November 2000
- Studio: Atlantis and Polar Studios, Stockholm
- Genre: Pop rock
- Length: 3:17
- Label: Roxette Recordings; EMI
- Songwriter(s): Per Gessle
- Producer(s): Clarence Öfwerman; Gessle; Marie Fredriksson

Roxette singles chronology
"The Centre of the Heart" (2001)	"Real Sugar" (2001)	"Milk and Toast and Honey" (2001)

Music video
- "Real Sugar" on YouTube

"Real Sugar" is a song by Swedish pop music duo Roxette, released on 18 June 2001 as the second single from their seventh studio album, Room Service. The single was not released in the United Kingdom.

== Music video ==
The music video for "Real Sugar" was directed by Jesper Hiro. It begins with the music video for preceding single "The Centre of the Heart" being briefly shown on a small TV, before the channel is abruptly changed to a fictional late-night talk show hosted by a puppet. Roxette are seen performing the song while backed by the show's regular house band, puppets designed to resemble the Ramones. At the end of the video, the TV is turned off by two puppets, who are passionately kissing on a bed.

== Commercial performance ==
"Real Sugar"
Album version of the track. This clip is a portion of the song's second chorus.

The song was not as successful as Roxette's preceding singles. It performed well in Sweden, where it peaked at number 23 and spent almost three months on the chart. It became a hit in Argentina, where it peaked within the top three, and also in Spain, charting within the top five of the Spanish Airplay Chart and at number 12 on their national sales chart.

Conversely, it remains their worst-performing single to date in both Germany and Switzerland, spending a sole week on each chart and peaking at numbers 96 and 72, respectively.

== Formats and track listings ==
All songs written by Per Gessle.

- CD Single (8793650)
1. "Real Sugar" – 3:17
2. "It Will Take a Long Long Time" (Modern Rock Version) – 4:06
3. "Real Sugar" (Shooting Star Treatment) – 4:22
4. "The Centre of the Heart" (Enhanced Video) – 3:27

== Personnel ==
Credits adapted from the liner notes of The Pop Hits.

- Recorded at Atlantis and Polar Studios, Stockholm in November 2000.
- Mixed by Ronny Lahti, Clarence Öfwerman and Per Gessle at Polar Studios, Stockholm.

Musicians

- Marie Fredriksson – lead and background vocals and production
- Per Gessle – background vocals, acoustic and electric guitars and production
- Jonas Isacsson – electric guitar
- Christer Jansson – live drums and percussion
- Ronny Lahti – engineering
- Christoffer Lundquist – backing vocals, bass and electric guitars
- Clarence Öfwerman – keyboards, programming and production
- Mats "MP" Persson – keyboards and tremolo guitar
- Shooting Star – programming

== Charts ==
Chart (2001)	Peak position
Argentina (CAPIF)	3
Germany (GfK)	96
Poland (Polish Airplay Chart)	7
Spain (AFYVE)	12
Spanish Airplay (AFYVE)	5
Sweden (Sverigetopplistan)	23
Switzerland (Schweizer Hitparade)	72
