= Party Crasher (album) =

Studio album by Per Gessle
- Released: 26 November 2008 (Sweden)
- Genres: Pop, synthpop
- Length: 42:28 (standard edition); 45:58 (iTunes digital edition); 45:33 (Telia Digital Edition)
- Language: English
- Labels: Elevator Entertainment AB/ Capitol Records (Sweden); Sony BMG (UK)
- Producers: Clarence Öfwerman, Christoffer Lundquist; Per Gessle

Per Gessle chronology
Kung av sand - en liten samling 1983–2007 (2007)	Party Crasher (2008)	Small Town Talk (2018)

Singles from Party Crasher
- 1. "Silly Really" Released: 29 October 2008; 2. "Sing Along" Released: 4 February 2009

Professional ratings
Review scores
Source	Rating
Allmusic	3.5/5 stars
Aftonbladet	3/5 stars
Allehanda	4/5 stars
Corren	4/5 stars
Dagens Nyheter	3/5 stars
Expressen	3/5 stars
Metro	2/5 stars
NA	2/5 stars
Norrköpings Tidningar	3/5 stars
Sydsvenskan	2/5 stars

Party Crasher is the third English solo album by Swedish pop-rock singer and composer Per Gessle. This is his second worldwide-released English solo album under his own name after The World According to Gessle in 1997. Originally scheduled for release on 3 December in Sweden, it was actually released a week earlier on 26 November. The album reached #2 in the Swedish album charts, becoming the first Gessle involved studio album that did not reach #1 in Sweden since Roxette´s Pearls of Passion, in 1986.

When the album was released via Sony BMG in the UK on 15 June 2009, some fans were disappointed when it was realised that the CD version of the album would only be available to order online and no physical copies were to be available in record stores.

== Formats ==
- CD – containing the 12-track album (jewelcase version).
- CD – containing the 12-track album (digipack version).
- iTunes deluxe edition – digital download 12-track edition, plus one bonus track.
- Telia deluxe edition – digital download 12-track edition, plus one bonus track (different from the iTunes edition).
- LP limited edition – 12-track edition (6 on each side).

== Track listing ==
All music and lyrics by Per Gessle, unless stated.

1. "Silly Really" – 3:40
2. "The Party Pleaser" – 3:39
3. "Stuck Here With Me" – 3:20
4. "Sing Along" – 4:00
5. "Gut Feeling" – 3:34
6. "Perfect Excuse" – 3:11
7. "Breathe Life Into Me" – 3:41
8. "Hey, I Died And Went to Heaven" – 4:00
9. "Kissing Is The Key" – 3:08
10. "Thai With A Twist" – 2:41
11. "I Didn't Mean to Turn You On" – 3:35
12. "Doesn't Make Sense" – 3:50

=== Bonus tracks ===
iTunes deluxe edition:

13. "I'm Glad You Called" – 3:29
14. "Silly Really" (Right Into Your Bed Remix) (Remixed by Dick Mixon) – 6:31

Telia deluxe edition:

13. "Theme from Roberta Right" (Music: Per Gessle & Gabriel Gessle – Lyrics: Per Gessle) – 3:04

== Personnel ==
- Produced by Clarence Öfwerman, Christoffer Lundquist & Per Gessle
- Recorded at Aerosol Grey Machine, Vallarum, Sweden, between January & September 2008
- Engineer: Christoffer Lundquist; assistant engineer Lennart Haglund
- Mixed at Kingside, Stockholm, by Ronni Lahti in August–September 2008
- Track 4 mixed at Aerosol Grey Machine by Christoffer Lundquist in September 2008
- Words & music by Per Gessle, published by Jimmy Fun Music
- Played & sung by Per Gessle, Christoffer Lundquist, Clarence Öfwerman & Helena Josefsson
- Cover design by Pär Wickholm & Per Gessle
- Photos by Important Pete, Woody (Åsa Nordin-Gessle) & private
- Mastered by Henke at Masters of Audio, Stockholm
- Management: Marie Dimberg/D&D Management, Stockholm

== Release history ==
Country	Date
Sweden	26 November 2008
Norway	November 2008
Finland	November 2008
Indonesia	February
Japan	9 February 2009 (through import channel not pressed in Japan)
Ukraine	9 February 2009
Czech Republic	2 March 2009
Russia	2 March 2009
Hungary	4 March 2009
Spain	3 March 2009
Poland	9 March 2009
Canada	24 March 2009
South Africa	March 2009
Portugal	End of March 2009
Germany	First week of April 2009
Austria	First week of April 2009
Switzerland	First week of April 2009
Brazil	April 2009
Belgium	April 2009
United Kingdom	15 June 2009 (Sony BMG)

== Charts ==
=== Weekly charts ===
Chart (2008)	Peak position
Swedish Albums (Sverigetopplistan)	2

=== Year-end charts ===
Chart (2008)	Position
Swedish Albums (Sverigetopplistan)	24

== Certifications ==
Region	Certification	Certified units/sales
Sweden (GLF)	Platinum	40,000^{^}
^{^} Shipments figures based on certification alone.
