= Att vara Per Gessle =

Original book cover, 2007 edition

Att vara Per Gessle (ISBN 91-0-011200-3) – (Being Per Gessle) is a book, written by Swedish journalist Sven Lindström about Swedish pop-rock singer/songwriter and Roxette co-founder Per Gessle in 2007. The book is written in Swedish and contains a CD with 7 or 9 songs, depending on the issue of the book. The book was released on 30 October 2007 in Sweden only.

The first issue of 8,000 copies includes a CD with 9 songs, while the second issue of 22,000 copies contains a CD with 7 songs. The songs are demo versions of well-known Gessle solo songs and those recorded by Roxette.

== Doppade bara tårna – demos 1977–1990 ==
(Track listing – 9 song version)

1. "Saken slår mej som på huvudet!" (originally performed by Per's old band Grape Rock)
2. "Lägg din hand i min om du har lust"
3. "Svarta glas" (Roxette's "Neverending Love")
4. "Dansar nerför ditt stup i rekordfart" (Roxette's "Soul Deep")
5. "It Must Have Been Love" (demo 14 April 1987)
6. "The Look" (demo 30 March 1988)
7. "Listen to Your Heart" (Demo 9 May 1988)
8. "Joyrider" (Demo 22 May 1990)
9. "Joyrider" (Demo 23 May 1990)
