= Room Service (Roxette album) =

Studio album by Roxette
- Released: 2 April 2001
- Recorded: January 2000 – January 2001
- Studio: Atlantis and Polar Studios, Stockholm, Sweden
- Genre: Pop rock
- Length: 43:20
- Label: Roxette Recordings; EMI
- Producer: Clarence Öfwerman; Per Gessle; Marie Fredriksson

Roxette chronology
Have a Nice Day (1999)	Room Service (2001)	The Ballad Hits (2002)

Singles from Room Service
- 1. "The Centre of the Heart" Released: 19 March 2001; 2. "Real Sugar" Released: 18 June 2001; 3. "Milk and Toast and Honey" Released: 16 September 2001

Room Service is the seventh studio album by Swedish pop duo Roxette, released worldwide from 2 April 2001. A planned release in the United States failed to materialise, as the duo's label there, Edel Records America, had been disbanded the previous month due to financial difficulties. Marie Fredriksson was not as involved in the album's production as she had been on previous records, taking part in the composition of just two songs. The album was remastered and reissued with bonus tracks in 2009.

Three singles were released from the record: lead single "The Centre of the Heart" was a hit throughout Europe, and was Roxette's third number one single in their home country. "Real Sugar" underperformed; it remains the lowest-peaking of all their charting singles in both Germany and Switzerland. Conversely, "Milk and Toast and Honey" performed well, and was the album's longest-charting hit in Sweden and Switzerland. The latter was also the only single from the album to be released in the United Kingdom.

The album received mixed reviews upon release. AllMusic called it an "exciting, immediate, high-gloss pop gem that contains very little filler indeed", although other publications were critical of Per Gessle's lyrics, particularly to album track "Jefferson". The record performed well commercially throughout mainland Europe, and was one of the best-selling albums of the year in several territories, but was largely ignored in the United Kingdom, where it peaked at number 120.

== Production ==
Room Service is a shorter effort than preceding album, 1999's Have a Nice Day. The duo decided against touring in support of that release, with Per Gessle opting instead to immediately focus on recording demos for a follow-up album at his Tits & Ass recording studio in Halmstad in April 1999. He eventually demoed a total of 29 songs for Room Service, excluding songs written by Marie Fredriksson, or songs originally demoed for Have a Nice Day, such as "The Centre of the Heart". That song was first recorded in October 1997, and is the only track on Room Service to feature a production credit from Have a Nice Day co-producer Michael Ilbert.

Fredriksson was not as involved in the production of Room Service as she had been on previous records; she composed just two songs for the album: "Little Girl" and "Every Day". This is in stark contrast to Have a Nice Day—she composed ten songs for that record. In a 2009 interview with Swedish publication Filter, when asked about the possibility of working with Fredriksson again following her brain tumour diagnosis in 2002, Gessle responded: "This is difficult to say, but when I think about the [Room Service] sessions, she was obviously not too interested in Roxette [in] the years before she got sick."

"Little Girl" is Fredriksson's only contribution to the album. It was written and composed solely by her, while "Every Day" was co-written with Gessle. The latter song was also released on deluxe editions of The Ballad Hits in 2002, as well as The Rox Box/Roxette 86–06. It later appeared as a bonus track when Room Service was remastered and reissued in 2009, along with another Fredriksson-composed track, "All I Ever Wanted". Despite this, "All I Ever Wanted" is unrelated to the album: it had first been demoed in April 1997 and re-recorded in June 2004 during sessions for Fredriksson's first English-language solo album, 2004's The Change.

== Release and promotion ==
"The Centre of the Heart" was released as the lead single, and its music video was directed by longtime collaborator Jonas Åkerlund. Filmed over three days at The Madonna Inn in California, it is Roxette's most expensive music video, surpassing the budget of "Spending My Time" from their 1991 album Joyride. The song was sent to radio on 19 February 2001, with a commercial single release following a month later. It went on to spend four weeks at number one in Sweden, making it their third number one single in their home country. The album was released worldwide from 2 April, with a North American release set for the following day via Edel America Records. A United States release failed to materialise, as Edel America was disbanded in March 2001 due to financial difficulties, although the record was released in Canada through EMI Music.

Photography for the record sleeve was shot at The Madonna Inn and was created by Tempel, a design duo consisting of Åkerlund and photographer Sarah Sheppard. "Real Sugar" was released as the album's second single throughout Europe. It peaked at number 12 in Spain and number 23 in Sweden, but it performed poorly elsewhere, charting only in Germany and Switzerland and becoming their lowest-charting single to date in both territories (numbers 96 and 72, respectively). The third and final single from the album, "Milk and Toast and Honey", was more successful, peaking at number 21 in Sweden and becoming their longest-charting single in the country since "You Don't Understand Me" in 1995 (14 weeks). Similarly, it peaked at number 29 on the Swiss Hitparade and spent 17 weeks on the chart—their longest-charting single in that country since "Sleeping in My Car" in 1994. It was also the first and only single from Room Service to be released in the United Kingdom, where it peaked at number 89.

The "Room Service World Tour" was Roxette's first concert tour in over six years. Concerts planned in South Africa were cancelled after the September 11 attacks. The tour began on 28 September and saw them performing in Spain, Belgium, Germany, Switzerland, Austria, the Czech Republic, Russia, Estonia, Finland and Sweden over its 25-dates. On reviewing one of their concerts, Per Bjurman from Aftonbladet was critical of the duo's chosen playlist and suggested that they had become too stuck in their past glories. Johan Lindqvist from Göteborgs-Posten was more positive, scoring their concert in Munich four stars.

== Critical reception ==
Professional ratings
Review scores
Source	Rating
AllMusic	3/5 stars
Aftonbladet	2/5 stars
Expressen	3/5 stars
Göteborgs-Posten	2/5 stars
The Guardian	2/5 stars
MTV Asia	(7/10)
Yahoo! Music	4/10 stars

Room Service received a mixed response from critics. Leslie Mathew of AllMusic said it was their best album since Joyride (1991), calling it an "exciting, immediate, high-gloss pop gem that contains very little filler indeed." Chili Paddy from MTV Asia also praised the album, and said it contained several potential hit singles. Fred Bronson from Billboard rated it the 7th best album of the year. Bjurman from Aftonbladet put it bluntly: "[Room Service] is not very good", elaborating: "Many songs sound like covers of old Roxette material. Perhaps inevitable when a band returns to its 'roots', but a little more imagination may be required." However, he did praise the three singles, calling "Milk and Toast and Honey" their "strongest ballad since 'It Must Have Been Love' or maybe even 'Listen to Your Heart'," before ending his review with "Roxette is not finished. But soon, I suspect."

"Jefferson was always out of luck
I remember when we both grew up
Jefferson got hit by a westbound truck
I guess that didn't make him look like
a million bucks"

—lyrics to the first verse of "Jefferson".

The first verse of album track "Jefferson" was heavily criticised by English-language reviewers. Simon P. Ward from Yahoo! Music said he laughed "uncontrollably at that lyrical gem"; Caroline Sullivan from The Guardian called it "one of the worst first verses in history" and said of the entire album: "Fredriksson's vocals are compelling yet curiously unengaged as she tries to negotiate Per Gessle's lyrics." Ward additionally noted that "Make My Head Go Pop" has "everything and the kitchen sink thrown into it—keyboards, techno beats, the guitar riff from the Stones' 'Satisfaction', and strings." Anders Nunstedt from Expressen initially gave the album a positive review, rating it three stars out of five and praising Gessle's songwriting and Clarence Öfwerman's production. However, in recent years, he has given a more critical overview of the album. Speaking of Room Service in relation to Roxette's other studio albums, he called it "Outdated, unattractive and also relatively unmusical." He also hypothesized: "On Have a Nice Day, you heard a band that had lost its compass. You do not have to listen carefully to Room Service to hear the sound of a duo who had been lost in the woods for so long that the search had ended."

== Commercial performance ==
The album was not as successful as the duo's preceding studio albums, and was largely ignored in the United Kingdom, peaking at number 120 there. Per Gessle commented in 2009: "Of course, it's hard to stay on top of the world forever. I'm old-fashioned, in that I believe it's enough to have a fantastic song and it will become a hit and then you can be on top again. Joyride sold 11 million copies, Look Sharp! 9 million, which means there are a lot of people who know who we are and who might be interested in what we are still doing. But it's normal for some albums to sell less than others, like Have a Nice Day. 'We'll sell more next time', I thought, but then Room Service did even worse. I don't know why."

Room Service peaked at number three on Billboard's European Albums, and at number two on CNN's WorldBeat Albums. It topped the national record charts in both Belgium and Sweden, and peaked at number two in Switzerland, number three in Germany, number four in Austria, number five in Greece and Spain, number seven in Norway, number eight in Poland, and number ten in Finland. It performed particularly well in Scandinavian territories, ending 2001 as one of the top fifteen best-selling albums of the year in Finland (tenth), Sweden (twelfth), and Norway (fourteenth). It sold well throughout central Europe. It was the 34th best-selling album of the year in Germany, the 42nd best-selling album in Belgium, and the 46th best-selling album in Switzerland. It was also certified either gold or platinum in many of these countries.

== Track listing ==
All tracks are written by Per Gessle, except "Little Girl" written by Marie Fredriksson.

Room Service – Original release
No.	Title	Length
1.	"Real Sugar"	3:17
2.	"The Centre of the Heart"	3:22
3.	"Milk and Toast and Honey"	4:04
4.	"Jefferson"	3:51
5.	"Little Girl"	3:36
6.	"Looking for Jane"	3:19
7.	"Bringing Me Down to My Knees"	3:48
8.	"Make My Head Go Pop"	3:22
9.	"Try (Just a Little Bit Harder)"	3:13
10.	"Fool"	3:52
11.	"It Takes You No Time to Get Here"	3:35
12.	"My World, My Love, My Life"	4:02
Total length:		43:21

Room Service – Japanese release
No.	Title	Length
13.	"Entering Your Heart" (Extended Version)	4:34
Total length:		47:55

Room Service – South African bonus disc
No.	Title	Length
0.	"The Centre of the Heart" (Enhanced Music Video)	3:29
1.	"The Centre of the Heart" (StoneBridge Club Mix)	7:49
2.	"The Centre of the Heart" (Jens Bjurman and Per Kalenius's Yoga Remix)	3:29
3.	"Real Sugar" (Shooting Star Treatment)	4:22
4.	"Milk and Toast and Honey" (Active Dance Remix)	3:49
5.	"It Will Take a Long Long Time" (Modern Rock Version)	4:06
6.	"Entering Your Heart" (Original Version)	4:00
Total length:		27:35

Room Service – 2009 reissue (CD bonus tracks)
No.	Title	Length
13.	"Entering Your Heart" (Original Version)	4:00
14.	"The Weight of the World"	2:52
15.	"Bla Bla Bla Bla Bla (You Broke My Heart)"	4:37
Total length:		54:50

Room Service – 2009 reissue (iTunes bonus tracks)
No.	Title	Writer(s)	Producer(s)	Length
16.	"Every Day"	Fredriksson (music); Gessle (lyrics)		3:26
17.	"Bla Bla Bla Bla Bla (You Broke My Heart)" (Demo)		Gessle	4:36
18.	"All I Ever Wanted"	Fredriksson	Mikael Bolyos	4:17
19.	"Stupid" (Roxette Version)			3:26
Total length:				70:35

== Personnel ==
Credits adapted from the liner notes of Room Service.

- Roxette are Per Gessle and Marie Fredriksson
- Recorded at Atlantis Studios and Polar Studios in Stockholm between January 2000 and January 2001.
- Mastered by Chris Blair at Abbey Road Studios, London
- Remastered by Alar Suurna at Polar Studios, Stockholm (2009 reissue)

Musicians

- Marie Fredriksson – lead and background vocals, percussion, production and sleeve design
- Per Gessle – lead and background vocals, acoustic guitar, 12-stringed acoustic guitar, electric guitar, banjo, keyboards, percussion, programming, production, mixing and sleeve design
- Jonas Isacsson – acoustic guitar, 6-stringed and 12-stringed electric guitars and E-Bow
- Christer Jansson – live drums and electronic drum loops; percussion (cymbal, maracas, tambourine, timpani and handclaps)
- Christoffer Lundquist – backing vocals, bass guitar, electric guitar, 6-stringed and 12-stringed acoustic guitars, zither and percussion
- Clarence Öfwerman – keyboards, percussion, programming, engineering, production and mixing
- Mats "MP" Persson – electric guitar, tremolo guitar, keyboards, synth bass, programming and engineering
- Shooting Star – programming

Additional musicians and technical personnel

- Jonas Åkerlund – photography and art direction
- Micke "Nord" Andersson – acoustic guitar (track 7)
- David Birde – electric guitar (track 4)
- Mikael Bolyos – engineering (track 5)
- Marie Dimberg – management
- Mats Holmquist – conducting (tracks 2, 3 and 12)
- Michael Ilbert – engineering and co-production (track 2)
- Ronny Lahti – engineering and mixing
- Sarah Sheppard – photography and art direction
- Stockholm Session Strings – strings (tracks 2, 3 and 12)
- Mattias Torell – acoustic guitar (track 5)

== Charts ==
=== Weekly charts ===
Chart (2001)	Peak; position
Austrian Albums (Ö3 Austria)	4
Belgian Albums (Ultratop Flanders)	1
Danish Albums (Hitlisten)	11
Dutch Albums (Album Top 100)	80
European Albums (Billboard)	3
Finnish Albums (Suomen virallinen lista)	10
German Albums (Offizielle Top 100)	3
Greek Albums (IFPI Greece)	5
Hungarian Albums (MAHASZ)	18
Italian Albums (FIMI)	22
Japanese Albums (Oricon)	34
Norwegian Albums (VG-lista)	7
Polish Albums (ZPAV)	8
Spanish Albums (Promúsicae)	5
Swedish Albums (Sverigetopplistan)	1
Swiss Albums (Schweizer Hitparade)	2
UK Albums (OCC)	120

=== Year-end charts ===
Chart (2001)	Position
Belgian Albums (Ultratop Flanders)	42
Finnish Albums (Suomen virallinen lista)	10
German Albums (GfK)	34
Norwegian Albums (VG-lista)	14
Swedish Albums (Sverigetopplistan)	12
Swiss Albums (Schweizer Hitparade)	46

== Certifications ==
Region	Certification	Certified units/sales
Finland (Musiikkituottajat)	Gold	23,394
Germany (BVMI)	Gold	150,000^{^}
Spain (PROMUSICAE)	Gold	50,000^{^}
Sweden (GLF)	Platinum	80,000^{^}
Switzerland (IFPI Switzerland)	Gold	20,000^{^}
^{^} Shipments figures based on certification alone.
