= Sing Along (Per Gessle song) =

Single by Per Gessle

from the album Party Crasher
- B-side: "Theme From Roberta Right"
- Released: 4 February 2009 (Sweden)
- Recorded: Vallarum (Skåne), Sweden
- Genre: Pop, Synthpop
- Length: 3:25
- Label: Elevator Entertainment AB; Capitol Records
- Songwriter(s): Per Gessle
- Producer(s): Clarence Öfwerman; Christoffer Lundquist; Per Gessle

Per Gessle singles chronology
"Silly Really" (2008)	"Sing Along" (2009)

Alternative covers
- Green alternative cover

"Sing Along" is a pop song by Swedish singer and composer Per Gessle from his album Party Crasher. It was released as the second single from the album on 4 February 2009 and features two different sleeves, one red and one green.

An acoustic version of the song was performed live at TV4's breakfast television programme "Nyhetsmorgon" on 6 December 2008. It featured both Per Gessle and Helena Josefsson (vocals), Clarence Öfwerman (piano), Magnus Börjesson (bass) and Jonas Isacsson (acoustic guitar).

== Critical reception ==
When Expressen's Andreas Nunstedt reviewed the Party Crasher album he noted that Helena Josefsson, who sang like a British nightingale from the 1960s on Son Of A Plumber, is prominent. Power ballad à la Joyride».

== Track listing ==
Swedish CD single
(4 February 2009)

1. "Sing Along" (Radio Edit) – 3:25
2. "Theme From Roberta Right" – 3:05
3. "Sing Along" (Album Version) – 4:01

== Credits ==
- Vocals by Per Gessle & Helena Josefsson.
- Played and produced by Clarence Öfwerman, Christoffer Lundquist & Per Gessle.
- Recorded at Aerosol Grey Machine, Vallarum, between January and September 2008.
- Engineer: Christoffer Lundquist.
- Mixed by Ronny Lahti.
- Words & music by Per Gessle (1 & 3).
- Words by Per Gessle, music by Gabriel Gessle & Per Gessle (2).
- Published by Jimmy Fun Music.
- Design by Pär Wickholm.
- Photo by Åsa Nordin-Gessle (credited as "Woody").

== Charts ==
Chart (2009)	Peak position
Swedish Singles Chart	41
