= The Ballad of Lucy Jordan =

1974 single by Dr. Hook & the Medicine Show

"The Ballad of Lucy Jordon"
- Dutch release picture sleeve

Single by Dr. Hook & the Medicine Show
- B-side: "Make it Easy"
- Released: 1974
- Length: 3:53
- Label: CBS
- Songwriter: Shel Silverstein
- Producer: Ron Haffkine

Dr. Hook & the Medicine Show singles chronology
"Life Ain't Easy" (1973)	"The Ballad of Lucy Jordon" (1974)	"The Millionaire" (1975)

Official audio
- "The Ballad Of Lucy Jordon" on YouTube

"The Ballad of Lucy Jordan" is a song by American poet and songwriter Shel Silverstein. It was originally recorded and released as a single, on the CBS label, in 1974 by Dr. Hook & the Medicine Show, with the name spelled "Jordon". The song also appears on their 1975 compilation album The Ballad of Lucy Jordon. The song describes the disillusionment and mental deterioration of a suburban housewife, who climbs to a rooftop "when the laughter grew too loud".

Dr. Hook's version was released as a single in the US, Canada, the UK and the Netherlands. In the Netherlands, "The Ballad of Lucy Jordan" spent 2 weeks at No. 29 on the Dutch Single Tip during November 1974. Throughout February 1975 for three weeks in the UK, the single appeared in the unnumbered breakers list.

== Charts ==
Chart (1974–75)	Peak position
Netherlands (Dutch Single Tip)	29
UK Singles (OCC)	(Note: "The Ballad of Lucy Jordan" did not chart in the UK singles chart but spent three weeks in the unnumbered Longer List of Breakers.)

== Marianne Faithfull version ==
"The Ballad of Lucy Jordan"

Single by Marianne Faithfull

from the album Broken English
- B-side: "Brain Drain"
- Released: 26 October 1979
- Recorded: May–July 1979; Matrix Studios, London
- Genre: New wave; electronic
- Length: 4:09
- Label: Island
- Songwriter: Shel Silverstein
- Producer: Mark Miller Mundy

Marianne Faithfull singles chronology
"The Way You Want Me To Be" (1978)	"The Ballad of Lucy Jordan" (1979)	"Broken English" (1980)

Official video
- "The Ballad Of Lucy Jordan" at TopPop on YouTube

=== Background ===
The song was recorded by the English singer Marianne Faithfull for her 1979 album Broken English. This version was released as a single, on the Island label, in October 1979, and became one of her highest-charting songs.

In an interview on ITV's The South Bank Show aired on 24 June 2007, Faithfull said that her interpretation was that Lucy climbs to the rooftop but gets taken away by "the man who reached and offered her his hand" in an ambulance ("long white car") to a psychiatric hospital, and that the final lines ("At the age of thirty-seven she knew she'd found forever / As she rode along through Paris with the warm wind in her hair ...") are actually in her imagination at the hospital.

The official music video for the song features Faithfull alone, smartly dressed and with coiffured hair adorned with ornate golden oak leaves. Shots with her squatting on the floor hugging herself or her standing looking tense, anxious and remote, alternate and overlap with shots of her singing the song, either in full length or in close-up portrait. An alternate promotional 12-minute music video was also created, which was directed by Derek Jarman and features the tracks "Witches Song", "The Ballad of Lucy Jordan" and "Broken English", and features Faithfull walking around the centre of London while the songs play one after another the background; the "Broken English" segment is interspersed with footage from World War II.

=== Reception ===
During the time of the release of Faithfull's version, "The Ballad of Lucy Jordan" received a mix of positive and negative reviews by music magazines, critics and newspaper tabloids. One review by Peter Trollope of the Liverpool Echo says "Marianne has lost none of her touch when it comes to the vocal stakes... Marianne recruited people like Stevie [Winwood] to play on the backing tracks. The result is pleasant song that should chart if it gets the right airplay."

New Musical Express gave a negative review; "This is not the time or place for a Marianne Faithfull revival, especially one which chooses to cover a ghastly Dr. Hook/Shel Silverstein collaboration. If Ms. Faithfull ever was a torch singer, her batteries are certainly flat".

Smash Hits said, "The Debbie Harry of the sixties returns to vinyl with an honestly outstanding offering, a version of an old Doctor Hook number related over a swimming synthesiser. If you can handle this, it sounds like Dolly Parton produced by Brian Eno. Only better."

The Kilmarnock Standard said "The song is great, considered by many to be one of Shel Silverstein's finest... Marianne has had a rough time since her couple of pop hits in '64 and her Jagger affair. Her acting career has faltered time and time again and I'm afraid I can't hear much hope of success in this production, mainly due to her vocals."

AllMusic noted Faithfull's "faint vocal approach accompanied by the lone synthesizer emanates an eerie candor throughout the song's duration. This wispiness helps to build the fantasy/reality concept of the song, and shows Faithfull at her most sincere." Pitchfork mentioned the, "pain in her fractured voice".

The Arts Desk said, "Pin-sharp, it was laceratingly at one with the dark clouds gathering over music in the wake of punk." Billboard ranked the song number two on its list of the top ten greatest Marianne Faithfull songs.

=== In popular culture ===
"The Ballad of Lucy Jordan" is featured on the soundtracks to the films Montenegro and Thelma & Louise. Thelma and Louise has a similar fatalistic theme. The single was reissued to promote those films. The song also featured on the soundtrack for the 2003 film Tarnation.

Faithfull also performed the song during a guest appearance in the episode "Donkey" from the fourth season of Absolutely Fabulous, in which God (Faithfull) sings the song in a dream to a miserable, dieting Edina. In 2016, the Faithfull version was used in the finale of American Horror Story: Hotel.

=== Personnel ===
- Marianne Faithfull – vocals
- Steve Winwood – synthesizer

=== Charts ===
Chart (1979–80)	Peak position
Australia (Kent Music Report)	48
Austria (Ö3 Austria Top 40)	2
Belgium (Ultratop 50 Wallonia)	7
France (SNEP)	17
Netherlands (Dutch Top 40)	19
New Zealand (Recorded Music NZ)	20
South Africa (Springbok Radio SA Top 20)	4
Switzerland (Schweizer Hitparade)	5
UK Singles (Official Charts)	48
West Germany (GfK)	5

Chart (2025)	Peak position
UK Singles Sales (OCC)	38
UK Singles Downloads (OCC)	38

== Other versions ==
- 1980: Marie Bottrell, on her album The Star, reached No. 10 on the Canadian Country chart
- 1995: The Barra MacNeils, on their album The Question, reached No. 50 on the Canadian AC chart
- 1996 Belinda Carlisle as a B-side of her single "Always Breaking My Heart"
- 2000: Dennis Locorriere, on his album Out of the Dark (as the singer for Dr. Hook, he performed on the original version of the song)
