= Tycker om när du tar på mej =

2003 single by Per Gessle

Single by Per Gessle

from the album Mazarin
- Released: 12 October 2003
- Label: Capitol; Elevator Entertainment
- Songwriter(s): Per Gessle
- Producer(s): Per Gessle; Clarence Öfwerman; Christoffer Lundquist

Per Gessle singles chronology
"På promenad genom stan" (2003)	"Tycker om när du tar på mej" (2003)	"C'mon" / "Jo-Anna Says" (2005)

"Tycker om när du tar på mej" is a song written and performed by Swedish singer-songwriter Per Gessle. It was released as the third single from his fourth studio album, Mazarin. The song peaked at number in Sweden, spending a total of 21 weeks on the Hitlistan chart.

== Track listing ==
1. "Tycker om när du tar på mej" – 3:25
2. "Mannen med gitarr" (demo 20 November 2002) – 3:15
3. "Viskar" (demo 30 August 2002) – 3:29
4. "Kyss från en främling" (demo 18 October 1999) – 3:03

== Charts ==
=== Weekly charts ===
Chart (2003–2004)	Peak position
Sweden (Sverigetopplistan)	9

=== Year-end charts ===
Chart (2004)	Position
Sweden (Hitlistan)	63
