= På väg, 1982–86 =

På väg, 1982-86

Box set by Per Gessle
- Released: 1 July 1992
- Recorded: 1982–1986
- Genre: Pop
- Label: EMI

Per Gessle chronology
Scener (1985)	På väg, 1982-86 (1992)	Hjärtats trakt (1993)

Alternative cover
- Demos 1982-86 cover

På väg, 1982–86 is a three CD box set from Swedish pop artist Per Gessle. It was released on 1 July 1992 and includes Gessle's first two solo albums, Scener and Per Gessle, plus a Demos CD titled Demos, 1982-86.

== Track listings ==
All tracks are written by Per Gessle.

CD1 - Per Gessle
No.	Title	Length
1.	"På väg"	3:39
2.	"Hjärtats trakt"	3:20
3.	"Om du har lust"	3:59
4.	"Timmar av iver"	1:46
5.	"Regn"	3:15
6.	"Indiansommar"	0:52
7.	"Historier vi kan"	3:09
8.	"Ledmotiv från 'Indiansommar'"	0:54
9.	"Den öde stranden"	4:11
10.	"Fiskarnas tecken"	3:59
11.	"Rädd"	3:30
12.	"Tända en sticka till"	4:28
13.	"Syreneras tid"	4:04
14.	"Överallt"	3:42
15.	"Man varnade för halka"	3:04
16.	"När morgonen kommer"	2:01

CD2 - Scener
No.	Title	Length
1.	"Galning"	4:17
2.	"Rickie Lee"	2:58
3.	"Lycklig en stund"	2:20
4.	"Väntat så länge"	4:40
5.	"Inte tillsammans, inte isär"	3:01
6.	"Viskar"	5:31
7.	"Blå december"	5:31
8.	"Den tunna linjen"	2:50
9.	"Kapten"	4:55
10.	"Speedo"	3:17
11.	"Scen"	0:42
12.	"Om jag en dag"	5:26
13.	"Tänd ett ljus"	3:54
14.	"Ute på landet"	3:18
15.	"Mandolindagar"	3:16
16.	"Farväl Angelina"	3:43

CD3 - Demos, 1982-86
No.	Title	Length
1.	"Blåa jeans (och röda läppar)"	4:38
2.	"Segla på ett moln"	3:20
3.	"Nu lyser det från hus och rum"	4:03
4.	"Var blev du av?"	1:54
5.	"Krig"	3:14
6.	"Fåglar"	2:08
7.	"Ros"	3:02
8.	"Ingen kan som du"	4:33
9.	"Den bästa tiden"	2:24
10.	"Havet slå mot land"	3:39
11.	"Som i en dröm"	5:07
12.	"Om du ser henne"	3:43
13.	"Kom ut till stranden"	5:32
14.	"Kärlekens skepp"	4:13

Tracks 14–16 on disc 1 and 13–16 on disc 2 are bonus tracks.
