= Pratar med min müsli (hur det än verkar) =

Single by Per Gessle

from the album En händig man
- B-side: "Shopping With Mother"
- Released: 28 November 2007 (Sweden)
- Recorded: Vallarum (Skåne), Sweden
- Genre: Pop
- Length: 3:03
- Label: Elevator Entertainment AB; EMI Sweden
- Songwriter(s): Per Gessle
- Producer(s): Clarence Öfwerman; Christoffer Lundquist; Per Gessle

Per Gessle singles chronology
"Jag skulle vilja tänka en underbar tanke" (2007)	"Pratar med min müsli (hur det än verkar)" (2007)	"Silly Really" (2008)

Alternative cover
- Back artwork - Swedish CD single

"Pratar med min müsli (hur det än verkar)" ("Talking to my muesli (however that goes)") is a pop song written by Swedish singer and composer Per Gessle. It is the third single released from the album En händig man. It was originally intended as a promo-only single to be out on the beginning of October 2007. It was delayed and finally released alongside "Shopping With Mother" as a double A-side single. It wasn't as successful as previous singles from the album, spending only 2 weeks in the Swedish Singles Chart, eventually peaking at #47.

"Shopping With Mother", is an instrumental track specially recorded to be the theme song for "Boston Tea Party", a weekly TV-show aired by Swedish Kanal 5. Per himself made a series of guest appearances there (from 24 September until 26 November), the song being premiered in the last episode.

A video was also filmed, directed by Jens Jansson.

== Formats and track listings ==
Swedish CD single

(0946 3972372 0; November 28, 2007)

1. "Pratar med min müsli (hur det än verkar)" (Single edit) - 2:48
2. "Shopping With Mother" - 2:43
3. "Shopping With Mother (Voz Vibrante Remix)" - 3:57
4. "Shopping With Mother (Mother's Dub by Voz Vibrante)" - 3:56

== Charts ==
Chart (2007)	Peak position
Swedish Singles Chart	47

== Personnel ==
"Pratar med min müsli (hur det än verkar)'"

- Producers: Clarence Öfwerman, Christoffer Lundquist & Per Gessle
- Music & lyrics: Per Gessle
- Publisher: Jimmy Fun Music
- Sleeve: Kjell Andersson & Pär Wickholm
- Photo: Anton Corbijn

"Shopping With Mother"

- Producers: Clarence Öfwerman, Christoffer Lundquist & Per Gessle
- Music & lyrics: Per Gessle
- Remixes (3 & 4): Voz Vibrante (Real name: Erik Hjärpe)
- Publisher: Jimmy Fun Music
- Photo: Åsa Nordin-Gessle (credited as "Woody")
