= Love in the Key of C =

Single by Belinda Carlisle

Single by Belinda Carlisle

from the album A Woman & a Man
- Released: November 18, 1996
- Length: 3:50
- Label: Chrysalis
- Songwriter: Rick Nowels
- Producer: David Tickle

Belinda Carlisle singles chronology
"Always Breaking My Heart" (1996)	"Love in the Key of C" (1996)	"California" (1997)

"Love in the Key of C" is a 1996 single by American singer Belinda Carlisle. The song was the third release from her album, A Woman & a Man and reached number 20 on the UK Singles Chart, becoming her 10th top-20 hit there. It was written by her regular songwriter, Rick Nowels and produced by David Tickle. This remains Carlisle's final UK top-20 hit as of 2026.

== Music video ==
The video for the single was directed by Philippe Gautier and featured Shelley Preston, who was working as a backing singer for Carlisle at the time.

== Track listings ==
CD 1

1. "Love in the Key of C"
2. "Kneel at Your Feet"
3. "In Too Deep (Live acoustic version)
4. "Circle in the Sand (Live acoustic version)

CD 2

1. "Love in the Key of C"
2. "Too Much Water" (Demo version) (Charlotte Caffey, Tom Caffey, Belinda Carlisle)
3. "Watcha Doin' to Me" (Demo version) (Charlotte Caffey, Tom Caffey, Belinda Carlisle)
4. "Don't Cry" (Demo version) (Charlotte Caffey, Tom Caffey, Belinda Carlisle)

== Charts ==
Chart (1996)	Peak position
Europe (Eurochart Hot 100)	69
Scotland Singles (Official Charts)	22
UK Singles (Official Charts)	20
