= På promenad genom stan =

Single by Per Gessle

from the album Mazarin
- A-side: "På promenad genom stan"
- B-side: "Inte tillsammans, inte isär"; (Demo)
- Released: 17 September 2003 (Sweden)
- Label: Elevator Entertainment AB; Capitol Records
- Songwriter(s): Per Gessle
- Producer(s): Per Gessle, Clarence Öfwerman, Christoffer Lundquist

Per Gessle singles chronology
"Här kommer alla känslorna" (2003)	"På promenad genom stan" (2003)	"Tycker om när du tar på mej" (2003)

"På promenad genom stan" is a song written and performed by Per Gessle and is the second single from his fourth studio album Mazarin. It describes a walk through his native city of Halmstad, describing various points of interest in the town. The song is a duet with Gessle's fellow Roxette-singer Marie Fredriksson, which is one of her first records released after falling ill in 2002.

== Track listing ==
1. "På promenad genom stan"
2. "Inte tillsammans, inte isär" (Demo)

== Charts ==
Chart (2003)	Peak position
Sweden (Sverigetopplistan)	20
