= Jag skulle vilja tänka en underbar tanke =

2007 single by Per Gessle

Single by Per Gessle

from the album En händig man
- Released: July 9, 2007 (Sweden)
- Recorded: Vallarum (Skåne), Sweden
- Genre: Pop
- Length: 3:16
- Label: Elevator Entertainment AB; EMI Music Sweden
- Songwriter(s): Per Gessle
- Producer(s): Clarence Öfwerman; Christoffer Lundquist; Per Gessle

Per Gessle singles chronology
"En händig man" (2007)	"Jag skulle vilja tänka en underbar tanke" (2007)	"Pratar med min müsli" (2007)

Alternative covers
- Back artwork - Swedish CD single

"Jag skulle vilja tänka en underbar tanke" ("I would like to think a wonderful thought") is a pop song written by Swedish singer and composer Per Gessle. It is the second single released from his sixth studio album En händig man, in digital format only. A promotional single (CDPRO 4410) was also released. It spent seven weeks on the Swedish Singles Chart, peaking at number 29.

The song was tested for Svensktoppen, where it entered on August 19, 2007 at number seven. Totally, the song spent eight weeks on Svensktoppen, peaking at number six.

== Formats and track listings ==
Digital download

(July 9, 2007)

1. "Jag skulle vilja tänka en underbar tanke" - 3:16

Swedish promotional CD

(CDPRO 4410; July 9, 2007)

1. "Jag skulle vilja tänka en underbar tanke" - 3:16

== Charts ==
Chart (2007)	Peak position
Sweden (Sverigetopplistan)	29

== Personnel ==
- Producers: Clarence Öfwerman, Christoffer Lundquist & Per Gessle.
- Music & lyrics: Per Gessle.
- Publisher: Jimmy Fun Music.
- Photo: Anton Corbijn.
