= The Lonely Boys =

Swedish Band

- Origin: Sweden
- Genres: Pop
- Years active: 1995
- Label: EMI Parlophone
- Members: Per Gessle; Nisse Hellberg

The Lonely Boys (Swedish: De ensamma pojkarna) is a fiction book by Swedish author Mats Olsson about a young rhythm 'n' pop band from southern Sweden in 1965.

Per Gessle (of Roxette fame) was asked by Mats Olsson to write a soundtrack to follow the book, so the band The Lonely Boys came into existence. The debut album by this 1965 fictitious band was released in December 1995. The band consisted of members from the two Swedish pop bands Wilmer X (Hellberg and Holst) and Gyllene Tider (Gessle, Persson and Andersson).

The band went to great lengths to create an authentic 1960s sound, from the lyrical content (Why did Adam have to fall in love with Eve) to the authentic instruments and amplifiers used in the recording process. The album is set out as two sides of an LP (although it was available on a promotional LP in Sweden), including crackles of the needle on the turntable and a pause between the two sides as the record is turned over.

== Band members ==
The Lonely Boys consists of:

- Lasse Göransson (a.k.a. Thomas Holst) on Bass guitar
- Roland Bergström (a.k.a. Mats "MP" Persson) on Vox- & Hammond organs, Piano
- Kalle Johansson (a.k.a. Micke "Syd" Andersson) on drums and tambourine
- Thomas Nyberg (a.k.a. Per Gessle) on rhythm guitar and vocals
- Richard Andersson (a.k.a. Nisse Hellberg) on lead guitar, harmonica, maraccas, tambourine and vocals

== The Lonely Boys (album) ==
=== Track listing ===
All tracks contain lead vocals by Per Gessle and Nisse Hellberg, except where noted.

Side one
No.	Title	Writer(s)	Lead vocals	Length
1.	"Lonely Boys"	Per Gessle		2:34
2.	"I'm Not Like You"	Nisse Hellberg		3:03
3.	"Keep the Radio On (This is the Perfect Song)"	Gessle		2:53
4.	"September Girl"	Hellberg	Hellberg	3:20
5.	"Adam & Eve"	Gessle		2:40
6.	"I Wanna Be With You"	Gessle		2:45
7.	"Fuzzy Puss"	Hellberg	Instrumental	2:13
Total length:				19:28

Side two
No.	Title	Writer(s)	Lead vocals	Length
1.	"So Much In Love"	Jagger-Richards		2:35
2.	"Flowers on the Moon"	Hellberg		2:50
3.	"Let Go of My Heart"	Hellberg	Hellberg	1:57
4.	"Apple in the Mud"	Gessle		2:47
5.	"Pretty Little Devil (With Angel Eyes)"	Hellberg	Hellberg	2:20
6.	"Genius Gone Wrong"	Gessle		3:11
7.	"Days to Come, Days of Gold"	Hellberg	Hellberg	3:31
Total length:				19:11
