= En händig man =

Studio album by Per Gessle
- Released: 13 June 2007 (Sweden)
- Recorded: September 2006–March 2007
- Genre: Pop
- Length: 41:06
- Label: Elevator Entertainment AB; EMI Music Sweden
- Producer: Clarence Öfwerman Christoffer Lundquist; Per Gessle

Per Gessle chronology
Son of a Plumber (2005)	En händig man (2007)	Kung av sand - en liten samling 1983–2007 (2007)

Singles from En händig man
- 1. "En händig man" Released: 23 May 2007; 2. "Jag skulle vilja tänka en underbar tanke" Released: 9 July 2007; 3. "Pratar med min müsli (hur det än verkar)" Released: 28 November 2007

Professional ratings
Review scores
Source	Rating
Allmusic	4.5/5 stars
Expressen	3/5 stars
NA	3/5 stars
Nöjesguiden	(Positive)

En händig man (A handy man) is a Swedish language album released by Swedish pop-rock singer and composer Per Gessle. The title track "En händig man" was the first single, followed by the Promo / Digital-only single, "Jag skulle vilja tänka en underbar tanke", while the last single was "Pratar med min müsli".

== Track listing ==
1. "En händig man" – 3.01
2. "Pratar med min müsli (hur det än verkar)" – 3.04
3. "Jag skulle vilja tänka en underbar tanke" – 3.16
4. "Fru Nordin" – 3.07
5. "Dixy" – 2.51
6. "När Karolina kom" – 2.51
7. "Hannas kärlekspil" – 2.11
8. "Om du kommer ihåg" – 2.59
9. "Om jag vetat då (vad jag vet nu)" – 3.35
10. "Tom Tom" – 2.59
11. "Våldsamt stillsamt" – 2.41
12. "Trött" – 2.47
13. "Samma gamla vanliga visa" – 2.31
14. "Min hälsning" – 3.23

Digital downloads only

1. "En händig man" (Tits & Ass Demo 13 Juli 2006) * Digital Release only *
2. "Ett perfekt ägg" (Instrumental) * Digital Release only *
3. "En händig man" (blåser) ** Telia Version only **

Deluxe version bonus EP

1. "Hon vill sväva över ängarna" – 2.31
2. "Signal" – 2.56
3. "Solen kom från ingenstans" – 2.49
4. "Du kommer så nära (du blir alldeles suddig)" – 3.06

== Charts ==
Charts (2007)	Peak Position	Certifications
Swedish Album Chart	1	3 × Platinum
