= Always Breaking My Heart =

1996 single by Belinda Carlisle

Single by Belinda Carlisle

from the album A Woman & a Man
- B-side: "Love Walks In"; "The Ballad of Lucy Jordan"
- Released: September 9, 1996
- Length: 3:12
- Label: Chrysalis
- Songwriter: Per Gessle
- Producer: David Tickle

Belinda Carlisle singles chronology
"In Too Deep" (1996)	"Always Breaking My Heart" (1996)	"Love in the Key of C" (1996)

"Always Breaking My Heart" is the second single from American singer Belinda Carlisle's sixth studio album, A Woman & a Man (1996). The song was written by Per Gessle from Swedish band Roxette, and a demo of the song recorded by Gessle was later released as a B-side of his single "Do You Wanna Be My Baby?", as well as the 2009 reissue of Crash! Boom! Bang! (1994). Released on September 9, 1996, "Always Breaking My Heart" peaked at number eight on the UK Singles Chart and number 50 in Australia. It remains Carlisle's final UK top-10 hit.

== Critical reception ==
British magazine Music Week rated the song three out of five, writing, "Distinctively Belinda Carlisle, this hook-laden tune by Roxette's Per Gessle will see her straight back on the airwaves and high in the chart again." The review highlighted the song's composition and it's potential to perform well on radio and the charts.

== Music video ==
The accompanying music video for "Always Breaking My Heart" was directed by Philippe Gautier.

== Track listings ==
- UK CD1
1. "Always Breaking My Heart" (single version)
2. "Love Walks In"
3. "The Ballad of Lucy Jordan"
- UK CD2 and Australian CD single
1. "Always Breaking My Heart" (single version)
2. "Heaven Is a Place on Earth"
3. "Circle in the Sand"
4. "I Get Weak"
- UK cassette single and European CD single
1. "Always Breaking My Heart" (single version)
2. "Heaven Is a Place on Earth"

== Charts ==
Chart (1996)	Peak position
Australia (ARIA)	50
Europe (Eurochart Hot 100)	52
European Airplay (European Hit Radio)	34
Scottish Singles Sales (Official Charts)	8
UK Singles (Official Charts)	8
UK Airplay (Music Week)	21
