= Här kommer alla känslorna =

- Single cover

Single by Per Gessle

from the album Mazarin
- A-side: "Här kommer alla känslorna"
- B-side: "Nu är det ju juli igen, ju"; (instrumental)
- Released: 23 June 2003 (Sweden)
- Length: 2.43
- Label: Elevator Entertainment AB; Capitol Records
- Songwriter(s): Per Gessle
- Producer(s): Per Gessle, Clarence Öfwerman, Christoffer Lundquist

Per Gessle singles chronology
| "I Wanna Be Your Boyfriend" (2002) | "Här kommer alla känslorna" (2003) | "På promenad genom stan" (2003) |

"Här kommer alla känslorna (på en och samma gång)" ("Here Are All the Emotions (At the Same Time)") is a song written and performed by Per Gessle, and is the first single from his fourth studio album Mazarin. The single is Gessle's most successful release in Sweden, spending two months at number one on the Swedish Singles Chart, subsequently gaining platinum status. The song earned Gessle two awards in Sweden; a Rockbjörnen for Best Swedish Song and a Grammis for Best Song.

== Track listing ==
1. "Här kommer alla känslorna (På en och samma gång)" – 2:39
2. "Nu är det ju juli igen, ju" – 2:18

== Charts ==
| Chart (2003) | Peak position | Certification |
|---|---|---|
| Sweden (Sverigetopplistan) | 1 | GLF: Platinum |
