= En händig man (song) =

Single by Per Gessle

from the album En händig man
- B-side: "Vet du vad jag egentligen vill?"
- Released: 23 May 2007 (Sweden)
- Recorded: Vallarum (Skåne), Sweden
- Genre: Pop
- Length: 3:01
- Label: Elevator Entertainment AB; EMI Sweden
- Songwriter(s): Per Gessle
- Producer(s): Clarence Öfwerman, Christoffer Lundquist, Per Gessle

Per Gessle singles chronology
"I Like It Like That" (2006)	"En händig man" (2007)	"Jag skulle vilja tänka en underbar tanke" (2007)

Alternative covers
- Back artwork - Swedish CD single

"En händig man" ("A handy man") is a pop song written by Swedish singer and composer Per Gessle, which was released as the lead single from his sixth studio album En händig man. The single spent 16 weeks on the Swedish Singles Chart and peaked at number one for one week. The song also charted on Svensktoppen for four weeks, peaking at number seven on the chart.

== Formats and track listings ==
Swedish CD single
(0946 3972372 0; 23 May 2007)

1. "En händig man" - 3:01
2. "Vet du vad jag egentligen vill?" (instrumental) - 2:03

== Music videos ==
A video for the song was directed by Jeffery Richt. It was shot outside of Halmstad and features Gessle driving a car and singing in a rocky coast.

== Charts ==
Chart (2007)	Peak position
Sweden (Sverigetopplistan)	1
