= Small Town Talk =

2018 studio album by Per Gessle

Studio album by Per Gessle
- Released: 7 September 2018
- Recorded: October 2016–January 2017
- Studio: Blackbird Studios, Nashville; Aerosol Grey Machine, Scania; Tits & Ass Studio, Halmstad; Durango Studio, Stockholm; Shortlist Studio, Stockholm
- Genre: Country pop
- Length: 51:57
- Label: Elevator Entertainment; BMG
- Producer: Gessle; Christoffer Lundquist

Per Gessle chronology
En vacker dag (2017)	Small Town Talk (2018)	Gammal kärlek rostar aldrig (2020)

Singles from Small Town Talk
- 1. "Name You Beautiful" Released: 23 March 2018; 2. "The Finest Prize" Released: 13 July 2018; 3. "Being with You" Released: 24 August 2018

Small Town Talk is the tenth solo studio album and fourth English-language solo studio album by Swedish musician Per Gessle. It was released worldwide by Gessle's Elevator Entertainment label and BMG on 7 September 2018. A country pop record, it was primarily recorded in Nashville, Tennessee, and consists mostly of English translations of songs from Gessle's two 2017 Swedish solo albums, En vacker natt and En vacker dag. The album, like the two Swedish albums, was produced by Gessle and Christoffer Lundquist.

American songwriter Sharon Vaughn translated the songs to English. Gessle said he was unable to translate the lyrics himself, as the original Swedish lyrics were inspired by the deaths of his mother, brother and sister, who all died within three years prior to production. The record features vocal collaborations with Helena Josefsson, Nick Lowe, Savannah Church and Jessica Sweetman, and contains work from pedal steel guitarist Dan Dugmore and harmonicist Mickey Raphael.

"Name You Beautiful" was released as a single on 23 March 2018, and was the official theme song for the 2018 World Table Tennis Championships. "The Finest Prize" and "Being with You" were issued as singles in July and August, respectively. The latter was previously demoed for Roxette's 1999 album Have a Nice Day. "Hold on My Heart" was demoed for 2001's Room Service, while a version of "No One Makes It on Her Own" originally appeared on Charm School in 2011. The album received positive reviews from the Swedish music press, and peaked at number five on the Swedish Albums Chart.

== Background and recording ==
Small Town Talk primarily consists of English versions of songs that first appeared on Gessle's two 2017 Swedish solo albums: En vacker natt (English: A Beautiful Night) and En vacker dag (A Beautiful Day). Those albums were promoted with an arena and stadium tour of Sweden in the summer of 2017. The majority of the music on Small Town Talk was recorded at Blackbird Studios in Nashville, Tennessee over a three week period, in October and November 2016. Additional recording took place over the following two months at Aerosol Grey Machine in Scania, Tits & Ass Studio in Halmstad, and Durango Studio and Shortlist Studio in Stockholm. The album was produced by Gessle and Christoffer Lundquist, with the latter completing mixing in January 2017.

Instead of recording the album at Lundquist's Aerosol Grey Machine – the studio in which he recorded most of his later solo work – Gessle said he wanted to "change the environment a bit". He discussed recording in England or France, before eventually deciding on Nashville. Gessle said he was always "really curious" about Nashville and its musical history, but had only spent one day there promoting Roxette. Small Town Talk was primarily recorded at Blackbird Studios. He said he "talked to a few Swedish people who had recorded in Nashville and we eventually wound up at Blackbird Studios, and that was a jackpot for us. A great place with wonderful people working there."

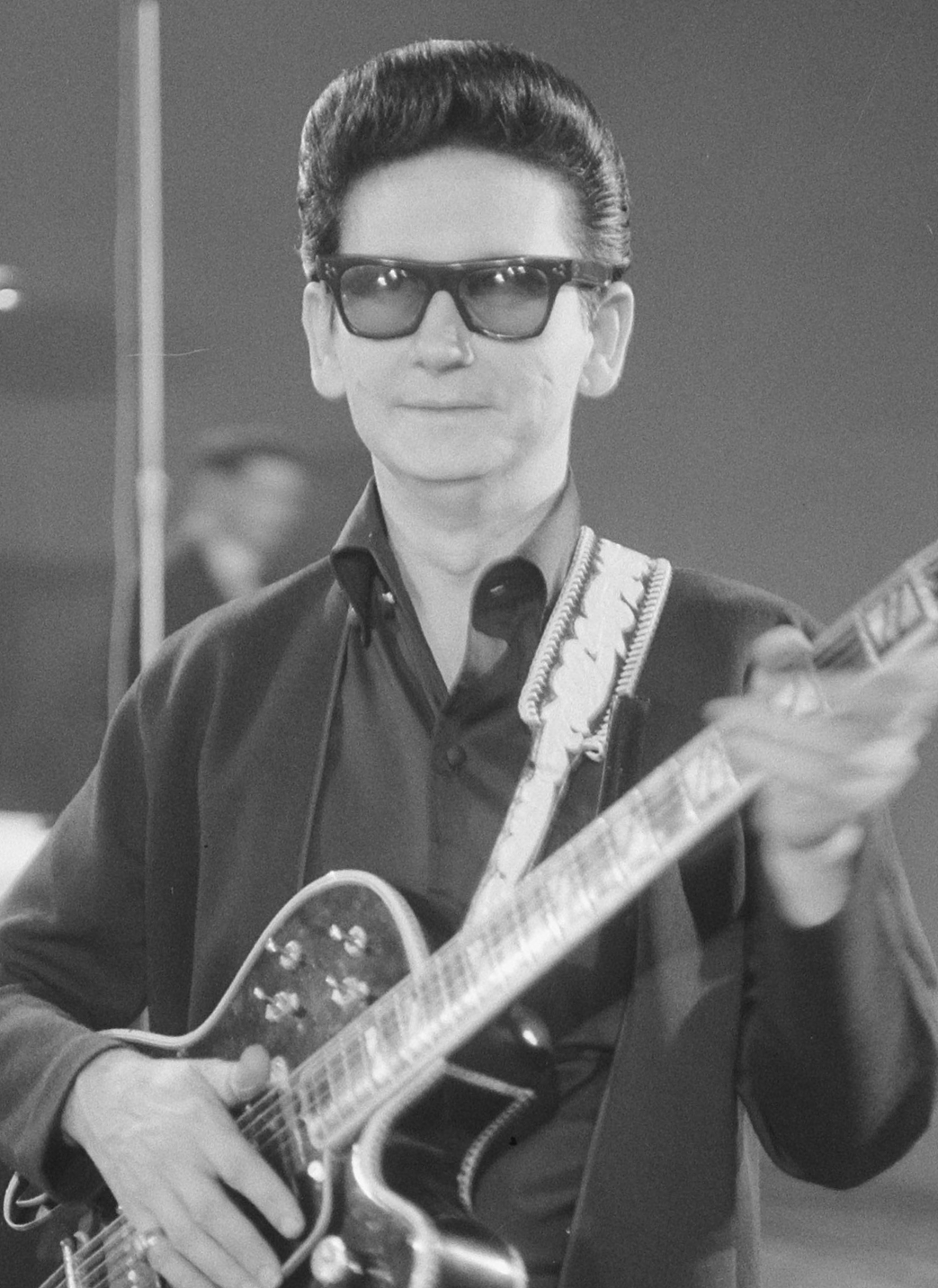
Gessle and Christoffer Lundquist used guitars owned by Roy Orbison (pictured in 1965) to record Small Town Talk.

Several local musicians contributed to Small Town Talk, including Dan Dugmore, a pedal steel guitarist who was recommended to Gessle by John McBride, the owner of Blackbird Studios. Dugmore played on every track, although his work was not included on every song he performed. Mickey Raphael plays harmonica; at the time of the album's recording, Raphael was Willie Nelson's harmonicist for over three decades. Gessle confirmed violinist Stuart Duncan also played on every song on the album. Gessle said Duncan "came aboard and he just blew our minds. What a musician! And that was exactly what I wanted. I didn't really have any idea how the songs should turn out. I wanted the players to be part of the construction and every overdub they did influenced the next." Roy Orbison Jr. – the son of Roy Orbison – provided his father's guitars for Gessle and Lundquist to use when recording.

The album also contains contributions from vocalists Savannah Church and Jessica Sweetman. The latter is credited as Jessica S. on the album's liner notes. Representatives of Big Machine Records and BMG recommended these vocalists to Gessle. English musician Nick Lowe provides vocals on the album's title track. The original Swedish version of the song, "Småstadsprat", featured vocals from Swedish musician Lars Winnerbäck, and was the most successful single from the Swedish albums. Gessle described Lowe as one of his "all-time musical heroes", saying he loved Lowe's work since the late 1970s and describing his 2001 album The Convincer as "one of my most played records ever." Gessle commented that he was "a little bit nervous that these major players would consider my songs some sort of third-rate country clichés but they didn't. They said they found the songs quite strange! I took it as a compliment."

== Composition and style ==
The album was described as country pop by Swedish publication Aftonbladet. Gessle said he was a "big fan of classic country music from the 60s and 70s", and that he "always had a sweet spot for that mix between country and rock music". He grew up admiring the likes of The Byrds, Crosby, Stills, Nash & Young, and Tom Petty. He listed crooners such as George Jones and Jim Reeves as influences on the album's songwriting, saying he listened to their music "since I was five or six years old, it's always been with me. From a songwriting point of view, it's very much about the lyrics and great storytelling."

The album contains six songs from En vacker natt: "Min plats" (as "There's a Place"), "Forsta pris" (as "The Finest Prize"), "Smastadsprat" (as "Small Town Talk"), "Allt gick sa fort" (as "It Came Too Fast"), "Tittar pa dej nar du dansar" (as "Simple Sound"), and "Far Too Close". Two songs from En vacker dag are also included: "Känns som första gången" (as "For the First Time") and "En vacker dag" (as "One of These Days"). The majority of these songs were translated to English by American songwriter Sharon Vaughn, who lived in Sweden for several years and is familiar with the Swedish language. Gessle said he was unable to translate these lyrics himself because they contained personal themes relating to the deaths of his mother, brother and sister, who all died within a span of three years. He praised Vaughn for doing "an amazing job" translating the lyrics.

Small Town Talk contains two original English compositions: "Name You Beautiful" and "Rudy & Me". The lyrics of both songs were written by Gessle. The music of "Name You Beautiful" was composed by Sebastian Atas and Victor Sjöström of Jubël alongside Gessle and Viktor Broberg; "Rudy & Me" was composed by Gessle with Andreas Broberger and Hannes Lindgren. He previously collaborated with the latter two to compose three songs on Roxette's 2016 studio album Good Karma. The album additionally contains three songs that Gessle previously recorded for Roxette. "Being with You" was demoed in September 1997 for Roxette's 1999 album Have a Nice Day. "Hold on My Heart" was demoed in January 2000 for Roxette's 2001 album Room Service. A version of "No One Makes It on Her Own" originally appeared on Roxette's 2011 album Charm School.

== Release and promotion ==
"Name You Beautiful" was the official theme song for the 2018 edition of the World Table Tennis Championships. It was released for digital download on 23 March 2018 as the first single from the album. Fans were invited to submit footage of themselves to be part of its official music video. A limited edition 7" vinyl, containing a Galavant remix of the song as the B-side, was released on 25 May. The song peaked at number ten on the Swedish Singles Heatseeker Chart the following week.

"The Finest Prize" was the official lead single from the album in Europe. It was released as a one-track digital download and streaming single on 13 July, the same day the song's lyric video was uploaded onto Gessle's personal YouTube channel. This was followed by the single "Being with You" on 24 August. The album was released worldwide on 7 September, on CD and vinyl formats, with the latter including a remix as a bonus track. Small Town Talk was issued worldwide by BMG under license from Gessle's own label Elevator Entertainment. A music video for "Being with You" was directed by Mattias Gordon and released on 10 September.

=== Per Gessle's Roxette tour ===
Gessle promoted the album with a European tour titled "Per Gessle's Roxette". He said the tour was a way to celebrate the English songs he had written throughout his career, including his work with Roxette. He said that it was "of course, really sad [that Roxette vocalist] Marie [Fredriksson] can't join me performing or recording anymore due to her health issues." However, he said that when faced with the option of continuing to perform Roxette songs or never performing them again, it was "an easy choice. The Roxette catalog is so much part of me and my life and I have a great band which I'm sure will find a unique angle to the material."

The live band for the tour was assembled after the recording sessions for Small Town Talk in Nashville. It included five different vocalists. Gessle said it was not his intention to replace Marie, and that although Helena Josefsson would sing lead vocals "on a couple of tracks", that there would be "five people singing so not every Marie song is sung by Helena." He said he duets with "female voices a lot because they sound great, and I like my voice better when it's mixed up with female voices for some reason—like Leonard Cohen or Lee Hazlewood." Gessle said the live band, which also included pedal steel guitar and violin, "sounds terrific actually, it sounds quite different from everything else I've done live. If you play classic Roxette songs, like 'Fading Like a Flower', 'Spending My Time', 'Listen to Your Heart' – big Marie ballads – and dress them up differently with this arrangement, something happens with the songs." The tour included a date at the Eventim Apollo in London, his first ever solo show in the United Kingdom.

== Critical reception ==
Professional ratings
Review scores
Source	Rating
Aftonbladet	3/5 +s
Nya Wermlands-Tidningen	3/5 stars

Aftonbladet said the album was an anomaly in Gessle's discography. They said his albums could previously be defined by whether he sings in English or Swedish, noting the distinction between his light-hearted English pop work with Roxette and his folk-based Swedish solo work or his punk material with Gyllene Tider. They said the album "fascinates", saying that even though it contains the same songs and instrumentation as En vacker natt och En vacker dag, the translation turns the songs from Gyllene Tider's 1995 single "Kung av sand" [English: "King of Sand"] to Roxette's 1992 single "Queen of Rain" "in a snap". They called the album "personal, retrospective and subtle", praising Gessle for coming to a point in his career where "freed from the pressure of writing world hits, he can only indulge in having fun and following his heart and the creative compass of his record collection." They noted similarities between Small Town Talk and Roxette's 1992 album Tourism, complimenting both for their "freedom of choice". They said Small Town Talk song "The Finest Prize" would "sit like a charm next to" Tourism album track "Cinnamon Street" on the Per Gessle's Roxette tour. Nya Wermlands-Tidningen said of the album, that after composing "around 267 songs a year since 1977, it is impressive that Per Gessle can still write as spirited and fresh as he does."

== Track listing ==
All lyrics are written by Per Gessle, except where noted; all music is composed by Gessle, except where noted.

Small Town Talk – CD
No.	Title	Lyrics	Music	Length
1.	"There's a Place"	Sharon Vaughn		3:19
2.	"The Finest Prize" (feat. Helena Josefsson)			4:12
3.	"Small Town Talk" (feat. Nick Lowe)	Vaughn		3:40
4.	"Simple Sound"	Gessle; Vaughn		3:45
5.	"Far Too Close" (feat. Savannah Church)			4:38
6.	"Hold on My Heart" (feat. Josefsson)			3:48
7.	"No One Makes It on Her Own" (feat. Josefsson)			3:50
8.	"Being with You"			3:36
9.	"It Came Too Fast"	Vaughn		3:45
10.	"Name You Beautiful" (feat. Josefsson)		Gessle; Sebastian Atas; Victor Sjöström; Viktor Broberg	3:55
11.	"For the First Time" (feat. Josefsson)	Vaughn		4:18
12.	"One of These Days"	Vaughn		3:59
13.	"Rudy & Me" (feat. Jessica S.)		Andreas Broberger; Hannes Lindgren; Gessle	5:06
Total length:				51:57

Small Town Talk – Vinyl bonus track
No.	Title	Length
14.	"Far Too Close" (feat. Savannah Church) (Alex Shield Remix)	4:38
Total length:		55:45

Notes

- The featured vocalist on "Rudy & Me" is credited in the album liner notes as "Jessica S." However, Gessle confirmed in an interview with Billboard that her full name is Jessica Sweetman.

== Credits and personnel ==
Credits adapted from the liner notes of Small Town Talk.

- Recorded at Blackbird Studios in Nashville, Tennessee in October and November 2016
- Additional recording at Aerosol Grey Machine in Scania, Tits & Ass Studio in Halmstad, Durango Studio in Stockholm, and Shortlist Studio in Stockholm between October 2016 and January 2017
- Mixed by Christoffer Lundquist at Aerosol Grey Machine in Scania in January 2017
- Mastered by Björn Engelmann at Cutting Room in Stockholm

Musicians

- Per Gessle – vocals and backing vocals, acoustic guitar, harmonica, production
- Magnus Börjeson – bass and "sonic vibes"
- Savannah Church – vocals on track 5
- Anton Corbijn – photography and cover art
- Andreas Quincy Dahlbäck – drums and percussion; engineering (at Durango)
- Dan Dugmore – dobro and pedal steel guitars
- Stuart Duncan – violin
- Tomas Ebrelius – violin and viola
- Luke Forehand – engineering (at Blackbird)
- Elizabeth Goodfellow – drums and percussion
- Ola Gustafsson – electric and pedal steel guitars
- Linnea Henriksson – backing vocals
- Anders Herrlin – bass and "sonic vibes"; engineering (at Shortlist Studio)
- Helena Josefsson – vocals on all tracks except 5, 9 and 13
- Nick Lowe – vocals on track 3
- Christoffer Lundquist – backing vocals, acoustic and electric guitars, bass, double bass, keyboards, mandolin, flute, banjo, percussion, engineering (at AGM), production
- Clarence Öfwerman – keyboards
- Mickey Raphael – harmonica
- Mats M.P. Persson – engineering (at T&A)
- Jessica Sweetman (credited as Jessica S.) – vocals on track 13
- Malin-My Wall – violin
- Pär Wickholm – sleeve design

== Charts ==
=== Weekly charts ===
Chart (2018)	Peak; position
Czech Albums (ČNS IFPI)	31
German Albums (Offizielle Top 100)	92
Swedish Albums (Sverigetopplistan)	5
Swiss Albums (Schweizer Hitparade)	63

=== Year-end charts ===
Chart (2018)	Position
Swedish Vinyl Albums (Sverigetopplistan)	25
