= Hjärtats trakt – en samling =

Hjärtats trakt - en samling

Compilation album by Per Gessle
- Released: 10 September 1997
- Genre: Pop, rock
- Label: EMI

Per Gessle chronology
The World According to Gessle (1997)	Hjärtats trakt - en samling (1997)	Mazarin (2003)

Hjärtats trakt – en samling was released on 10 September 1997 and is a compilation album from Swedish pop artist Per Gessle, who was one half of the duo Roxette. EMI released this low price album as a part of a whole series of albums by Swedish artists, and the CDs were mainly supposed to be sold at gas stations and convenience stores.

== Track list ==
1. "På väg"
2. "Hjärtats trakt"
3. "Rickie Lee"
4. "Inte tillsammans, inte isär"
5. "Indiansommar" (instrumental)
6. "Blå december"
7. "Den tunna linjen"
8. "Timmar av iver"
9. "Tända en sticka till"
10. "Ros"
11. "När morgonen kommer"
12. "Speedo"
13. "Om jag en dag"
