= I Want You to Know (Per Gessle song) =

Single by Per Gessle

from the album The World According to Gessle
- A-side: "I Want You to Know"
- B-side: "Blue Umbrella" (demo)
- Released: 9 September 1997 (Sweden)
- Recorded: EMI Studios, Stockholm, Sweden, January 1997
- Genre: Pop
- Length: 3:57
- Label: Fundamental, EMI
- Songwriter(s): Per Gessle
- Producer(s): Per Gessle, Michael Ilbert & Clarence Öfwerman

Per Gessle singles chronology
"Kix" (1997)	"I Want You to Know" (1997)	"I Wanna Be Your Boyfriend" (2002)

"I Want You to Know" is the third single from the Per Gessle album, The World According to Gessle.

== Track listings and formats ==
- CD single
1. "I Want You to Know"
2. "Blue Umbrella" (demo)
- Maxi CD
1. "I Want You to Know"
2. "Blue Umbrella" (demo)
3. "Jupiter Calling" (demo)
4. "Let's Party" (demo)

== Charts ==
Chart (1997)	Peak position
Swedish Singles Chart	48
