= Kix (song) =

Single by Per Gessle

from the album The World According to Gessle
- Released: June 23, 1997 (Europe); November 3, 1997 (UK)
- Recorded: EMI Studios, Stockholm, Sweden, January 1997
- Genre: Pop
- Length: 4:06
- Label: Fundamental, EMI
- Songwriter(s): Per Gessle
- Producer(s): Per Gessle, Michael Ilbert & Clarence Öfwerman

Per Gessle singles chronology
"Do You Wanna Be My Baby?" (1997)	"Kix" (1997)	"I Want You to Know" (1997)

UK release cover

"Kix" is the second single from Per Gessle's studio album The World According to Gessle.

== Music video ==
The video was directed by Jonas Åkerlund and featured several short scenarios, which were repeated over and over throughout the song.

== Track listings and formats ==
- CD single (7243 8841652 8)
1. "Kix"
2. "Kix" (Lovely Pair Mix)
- Maxi CD (7243 8841662 7)
1. "Kix"
2. "Kix" (Lovely Pair Mix)
3. "Kix" (Horribly Pear-shaped mix)
4. "Love Doesn't Live Here"
- CD 1 UK (7243 8841662 7 / CDEM 501)
1. "Kix"
2. "Kix" (Lovely Pair Mix)
3. "Kix" (Horribly Pear-shaped mix)
4. "Love Doesn't Live Here"
- CD 2 UK (7243 8848962 1 / CDEMS 501)
1. "Kix"
2. "Blue Umbrella" (demo)
3. "Jupiter Calling" (demo)
4. "Let's Party" (demo)

== Charts ==
Chart (1997)	Peak position
Sweden (Sverigetopplistan)	28
