= Wilmer X =

Swedish rock band

- Origin: Malmö, Sweden
- Genres: Rock
- Years active: 1978–present
- Labels: EMI; MNW; Capitol
- Members: Nisse Hellberg; Jalle Lorensson; Sticky Bomb; Thomas Holst
- Past members: Clas Rosenberg; Mats Thorin; Pelle Ossler; (see Personnel section for others)
- Website: wilmerx.com

Wilmer X is a Swedish rock band formed in Malmö in 1978. The group's original line-up comprised Nisse Hellberg, Clas Rosenberg, Jalle Lorensson and Mats Thorin. Rooted in rock and punk, their sound incorporated elements of pop, country, disco and blues.

== History ==
Wilmer X achieved their nationwide commercial breakthrough in 1988 with the LP Teknikens Under, the similarly entitled title track becoming a chart topper. As of date, Wilmer X has recorded more than eighteen studio albums during a career that spans thirty years.

In 1988 American artist Carla Olson, who is of Swedish heritage, recorded an album in Malmo, Sweden backed by members of Wilmer X. It is scheduled for re-release in early 2017 as Rubies & Diamonds on Sunset Blvd. Records with a few Sweden-related bonus tracks including Nisse Hellberg's song "Leka Med Live" (Playing With Life in English.) Swedish rocker Mikael Rickfors appears on two songs, his own composition "Touch" and Carla's "Kinderwars" which features Mick Taylor.

== Personnel ==
Current members

- Nisse Hellberg – vocals, guitars (1978–present)
- Jalle Lorensson – vocals, harmonica (1978–present)
- Sticky Bomb (Per-Åke Holmberg) – drums, percussion, vocals (1982–present)
- Thomas Holst – vocals, bass, guitars (1983–1986, 1990–present)

Former members

- Mats Thorin – drums (1978–1978)
- Clas Rosenberg – guitars, vocals, bass (1978–1982)
- Jörgen Stridh – drums (1978–1980)
- Lennart Nygren – bass (1980–1982)
- Jalle Olsson – drums (1980–1982)
- Stefan Björk – vocals, bass (1983–1990)
- Pelle Ossler – vocals, guitars (1986–2003)
- Mats Bengtsson – vocals, bass, keyboards (1988–2003)

=== Nisse Hellberg ===
Nils "Nisse" Hellberg (born in Limhamn, Malmö on 2 April 1959) is a Swedish composer, lyricist, singer, musician, guitarist and frontman of the band Wilmer X and its co-founder with Jalle Lorensson. Besides his work with Wilmer X, he has released materials independent of the band.

In 1995, he was part of a fictitious 1960s rock band called The Lonely Boys where he assumed the name Richard Andersson and where he played lead guitar, harmonica, maracas, tambourine and vocals. He was joined by Per Gessle (known as Thomas Nyberg), Lasse Göransson (Thomas Holst), Roland Bergström (MP Persson) and Kalle Johansson (Micke Syd Andersson). The band and its songs were based on De ensamma pojkarna (Swedish for The Lonely Boys) by the Swedish author Mats Olsson about a young rhythm'n'pop band from the south of Sweden in 1965.

In collaboration with Peps Persson, he released the album Röster från södern (Voices from the South). In 2007 and 2008 he toured throughout Sweden with his solo material and in May 2008, was the solo opening act for John Fogerty. With Clas Rosenberg, he published the comics Swedish series Herman Frid in 1981.

In 2014, he returned with a major solo album Vad har han i huvudet? released on Metronome label on 21 May 2014.

== Discography ==
=== Albums ===
Year	Title	Peak chart positions	Certification
Year	Title	SWE	Certification
1981	Wilmer X MP	39	
1982	Fula fula ord	–	
1983	Djungelliv	34	
1985	Under Hot	18	
1986	Downward Bound	–	
1986	...V.I.L.D.!	20	
1986	Not Glamorous	–	
1986	Tungt vatten	29	
1988	Teknikens under	12	
1989	Klubb Bongo	11	
1991	Mambo Feber	2	
1993	Pontiac till himmelen	6	
1994	Snakeshow	4	
1994	Hallå världen	4	
1998	Primitiv	4	
2000	Silver	4	
2003	Lyckliga hundar	8	
2005	13 våningar upp	1	
2022	Mer för dina pengar	2	
2026	Popmonster	3	

=== Other albums ===
Year	Title	Peak chart positions	Certification
Year	Title	SWE	Certification
1990	Orionteatern 22.03.90	–	
1991	En speciell kväll med Wilmer X	29	
1991	Radio Wilmer X: Hits! (1988-96)	5	
1991	Totalt - alla hits!	52	

=== Singles ===
Year	Title	Peak chart positions	Albums
Year	Title	SWE	Albums
1991	"Vem får nu se alla tårar"	9	
1993	"Ett och ett är två men blir tre när vi blir ett"	26	
1994	"Destination Clubland"	40	
1995	"Hallå världen"	31	Hallå världen
1998	"För dum för pop"	29	
2000	"Jag flippar ut"	28	
2000	"Silver"	50	Silver
2003	"Vi som blommar sent"	56	Lyckliga hundar
2005	"4 X 4"	28	
