= Silly Really =

Single by Per Gessle

from the album Party Crasher
- B-side: "I Didn't Mean To Turn You On"
- Released: October 29, 2008 (Sweden)
- Recorded: Vallarum (Skåne), Sweden
- Genre: Pop, Synthpop, Disco
- Length: 3:40
- Label: Elevator Entertainment AB; Capitol Records
- Songwriter: Per Gessle
- Producers: Clarence Öfwerman, Christoffer Lundquist, Per Gessle

Per Gessle singles chronology
"Pratar med min müsli" (2007)	"Silly Really" (2008)	"Sing Along" (2009)

"Silly Really" is a pop song by Swedish singer and composer Per Gessle from his album Party Crasher. It was released as the lead single from the album on October 29, 2008. The song premiered at the Swedish radio-show MorronZoo, in the morning of October 24.

The new remix of "Silly Really" will be released on January 19 or 26. It is also supposed to be available in "all digital stores". The song is remixed by Dick Mixon.

== Critical reception ==
Expressen's Andreas Nunstedt called Per Gessle "a pop genius" and described the song as a "happy love story where disco meets synthpop". Håkan Steen from Aftonbladet describes "Silly Really" in a similar way ("a beat that feels like Blondie in a disco mood"). Even if "the single may not sound that modern", he said the song is a sure hit for the Swedish radio.

== Music video ==
- Video produced by STARK Film & Event
- Director: Mikael Wikström
- Producer: Björn Fävremark
- Photo & cut: Torbjörn Martin

== Track listing ==
Swedish CD single
(50999 265629 2 6; October 29, 2008)

1. "Silly Really" – 3:40
2. "I Didn't Mean To Turn You On" – 3:35

Europe digital remix
(January 2009)

1. "Silly Really" (Right Into Your Bed Remix) (Remixed by Dick Mixon) – 6:31

== Credits ==
- Vocals by Per Gessle & Helena Josefsson.
- Played and produced by Clarence Öfwerman, Christoffer Lundquist & Per Gessle.
- Recorded at Aerosol Grey Machine, Vallarum, between jan. & sept. 2008.
- Engineer: Christoffer Lundquist.
- Mixed by Ronny Lahti.
- Words & music by Per Gessle.
- Published by Jimmy Fun Music.
- Design by Pär Wickholm.
- Photo by Åsa Nordin-Gessle (credited as "Woody").

== Charts ==
=== Weekly charts ===
Chart (2008)	Peak position
Sweden (Sverigetopplistan)	1

=== Year-end charts ===
Chart (2008)	Position
Sweden (Sverigetopplistan)	33
