= Do You Wanna Be My Baby? =

1997 single by Per Gessle

Single by Per Gessle

from the album The World According to Gessle
- B-side: "Always Breaking My Heart" (demo)
- Released: 4 April 1997
- Studio: Atlantis, Polar (Stockholm, Sweden)
- Length: 3:47
- Label: Fundamental, EMI
- Songwriter: Per Gessle
- Producers: Per Gessle, Clarence Öfwerman, Michael Ilbert

Per Gessle singles chronology
"Inte tillsammans, inte isär" (1986)	"Do You Wanna Be My Baby?" (1997)	"Kix" (1997)

"Do You Wanna Be My Baby?" is the first single from Swedish singer-songwriter Per Gessle's third studio album, The World According to Gessle (1997). It peaked atop the Swedish Singles Chart for one week in April 1997 and also charted in Iceland and the Flanders region of Belgium. B-side "Always Breaking My Heart" was also recorded by Belinda Carlisle for her album A Woman and a Man.

== Music video ==
The video was directed by Jonas Åkerlund and featured members from a circus which performed several acts.

== Track listings ==
- European CD single
1. "Do You Wanna Be My Baby?" – 3:47
2. "Always Breaking My Heart" (Tits & Ass demo, 30 May 1995) – 3:06
- Australian and Japanese CD single
1. "Do You Wanna Be My Baby?" – 3:47
2. "Always Breaking My Heart" (Tits & Ass demo, 30 May 1995) – 3:06
3. "I Wanna Be with You" (Tits & Ass demo, 2 November 1994) – 2:51

== Charts ==
=== Weekly charts ===
Chart (1997)	Peak position
Belgium (Ultratop 50 Flanders)	46
Iceland (Íslenski Listinn Topp 40)	32
Italy Airplay (Music & Media)	10
Sweden (Sverigetopplistan)	1

=== Year-end charts ===
Chart (1997)	Position
Sweden (Topplistan)	44

== Certifications ==
Region	Certification	Certified units/sales
Sweden (GLF)	Gold	15,000^{^}
^{^} Shipments figures based on certification alone.
