= The World According to Gessle =

Studio album by Per Gessle
- Released: 2 May 1997; 22 May 2003 (reissue); 14 May 2008 (remastered)
- Recorded: September 1996 – January 1997; Atlantis, Polar & EMI Studios; Stockholm, Sweden
- Genres: Pop rock, power pop
- Length: 54 mins.
- Labels: Fundamental, EMI
- Producers: Per Gessle, Michael Ilbert & Clarence Öfwerman

Per Gessle chronology
Hjärtats trakt (1993)	The World According to Gessle (1997)	Hjärtats trakt – en samling (1997)

Singles from The World According to Gessle
- 1. "Do You Wanna Be My Baby?" Released: 1997 April; 2. "Kix" Released: 1997 June; 3. "I Want You to Know" Released: 1997 September

Professional ratings
Review scores
Source	Rating
Allmusic	4.5/5 stars
Aftonbladet	4/5 stars
Expressen	1/5 stars

The World According to Gessle is the third solo album by Swedish pop singer Per Gessle, released on 2 May 1997. It was his first solo album in English. The title is a paraphrase of "The World According to Garp" - the novel by John Irving. The album topped the Swedish Album Chart.

"Do You Wanna Be My Baby?", "Kix" and "I Want You to Know" were released as singles. The videos for the singles were all directed by Jonas Åkerlund. At the end of the "Lay Down Your Arms" track, there is a hidden track. The track, an alternate version of "Kix" is called Cha-cha-cha, sung like Elvis Presley. The Japanese release of this album features the ballad "Love doesn't live here", the song was also recorded by Belinda Carlisle, featured on her album A Woman and a Man.

Gessle used Brainpool and Gyllene Tider as backing musicians for the album.

== Re-releases ==
The World According to Gessle was re-released on 22 May 2003 as a low budget edition in a cardboard sleeve, and again re-released on 14 May 2008 as an anniversary edition. This time it was a double CD, with 26 bonus tracks.

== Track listing ==
Original release

All tracks are written by Per Gessle, except where noted.

No.	Title	Length
1.	"Stupid"	3:31
2.	"Do You Wanna Be My Baby?"	3:47
3.	"Saturday"	3:54
4.	"Kix"	4:08
5.	"I Want You to Know"	3:57
6.	"Reporter"	4:17
7.	"B-Any-1-U-Wanna-B" (Homage to Brian W.)	3:56
8.	"Wish You the Best"	4:51
9.	"Elvis in Germany (Let's Celebrate!)"	4:10
10.	"T-T-T-Take It!"	3:16
11.	"I'll Be Alright"	3:50
12.	"There is My Baby"	3:47
13.	"Lay Down Your Arms" (incl. ghost track "Kix-cha-cha")	6:50
14.	"Love Doesn't Live Here" (Japan bonus track)	4:44

2008 remastered re-release

All tracks are written by Gessle, except where noted.

CD1
No.	Title	Length
1.	"Stupid"	3:31
2.	"Do You Wanna Be My Baby?"	3:47
3.	"Saturday"	3:54
4.	"Kix"	4:08
5.	"I Want You to Know"	3:57
6.	"Reporter"	4:17
7.	"B-Any-1-U-Wanna-B"	3:56
8.	"Wish You the Best"	4:51
9.	"Elvis in Germany (Let's Celebrate!)" (Battery Studio Mix)	4:10
10.	"T-T-T-Take It!" (Battery Studio Mix)	3:16
11.	"I'll Be Alright" (Battery Studio Mix)	3:50
12.	"There is My Baby"	3:47
13.	"Lay Down Your Arms"	4:19
14.	"Kix-cha-cha" (Ghost track)	1:30
15.	"Love Doesn't Live Here" (Outtake from album; B-side to "Kix")	4:44
16.	"Always Breaking My Heart" (B-side to "Do You Wanna Be My Baby?")	3:08
17.	"I Wanna Be With You" (B-side to "Do You Wanna Be My Baby?")	2:52
18.	"Blue Umbrella" (B-side "I Want You to Know")	3:18
19.	"Jupiter Calling" (B-side "I Want You to Know")	3:05
20.	"Let's Party!" (B-side "I Want You to Know")	3:59

CD2 – The Demos According to Gessle
No.	Title	Length
1.	"There Is My Baby" (27 June 1994)	3:42
2.	"I'll Be Alright" (16 July 1994)	3:46
3.	"June Afternoon" (17 July 1994)	4:13
4.	"Writer" (17 July 1994)	4:23
5.	"T-T-T-Take It!" (12 Sep 1994)	3:12
6.	"Elvis in Germany" (2 Nov 1994)	3:49
7.	"Every Day Outside My Window" (28 Dec 1995)	4:00
8.	"Love Doesn't Live Here" (25 Feb 1996)	4:16
9.	"Detective Jones" (29 Feb 1996)	2:53
10.	"Beautiful Things, Terrible Things" (7 Apr 1996)	4:12
11.	"Elvis in Deutschland" (26 Apr 1996)	4:46
12.	"Makin' Love to You" (acoustic version, 9 June 1996)	3:30
13.	"Lay Down Your Arms" (23 June 1996)	4:36
14.	"Do You Wanna Be My Baby?" (12 Aug 1996)	3:45
15.	"B-Any-1-U-Wanna-B" (24 Oct 1996)	3:32
16.	"Stupid" (28 Oct 1996)	3:40
17.	"Saturday" (2 Nov 1996)	3:24
18.	"Drum" (2 Nov 1996)	4:33
19.	"I Want You to Know" (28 Dec 1996)	4:00
20.	"Kix" (2 Jan 1997)	3:55

== Charts ==
Chart	Peak position	Certification
Swedish Album Chart	1; 1997	Gold
Swedish Album Chart	14; 2008 re-release	

== Credits ==
- Per Gessle - Words & Music, Vocals, Electric & Acoustic guitars, Harmonica, Tambourine, Vox Jaguar
- Christoffer Lundquist - Bass guitar, Zither, Flute, Electric guitar, Backing vocals, Minimoog
- Clarence Öfwerman - Piano, Mellotron, Vox jaguar, Organ, Synthesizers, Vocoder, Acoustic guitar, Backing vocals
- Michael Ilbert - Programming & percussion
- Mats M.P Persson - Electric & acoustic guitars
- Anders Herrlin - Bass guitar
- Micke "Syd" Andersson - Drums & percussion
- Jonas Isacsson - Electric guitars & E-bow
- Marie Fredriksson - Additional vocals on "I'll Be Alright"
- Micke "Nord" Andersson - Acoustic guitars
- David Birde - Electric & acoustic guitars
- Christer Jansson - Drums & percussion
- Jens Jansson - Drums & percussion
- Jalle Lorensson - Harmonica
- Pelle Siren - Acoustic guitar
- Jackie Öfwerman - Additional vocals on "Elvis in Germany"
- Erik Hausler - Baritone saxophone
- Wojtek Goral - Tenor saxophone
- Strings by S.N.Y.K.O - Conducted by Mats Holmquist. Arranged by Gessle, Ilbert & Öfwerman
