= Mazarin (album) =

Studio album by Per Gessle
- Released: 16 June 2003 (Sweden)
- Recorded: December 2002– February 2003
- Genres: Pop rock, soft rock
- Label: Elevator Entertainment
- Producers: Clarence Öfwerman, Christoffer Lundquist, Per Gessle

Per Gessle chronology
Hjärtats trakt - en samling (1997)	Mazarin (2003)	Son of a Plumber (2005)

Singles from Mazarin
- 1. "Här kommer alla känslorna (på en och samma gång)" Released: 2003; 2. "På promenad genom stan" Released: 2003; 3. "Tycker om när du tar på mej" Released: 2003

Mazarin is the fourth studio album by Swedish pop musician Per Gessle, released on 16 June 2003.

Per Gessle thought of this album as his little side project from Roxette, but it turned out to be a huge success, subsequently being certified 5× platinum status in Sweden. He also played some of the songs from it on the Gyllene Tider's Finn 5 fel! tour in 2004, despite the fact that they were not Gyllene Tider songs.

== Critical reception ==
Professional ratings
Review scores
Source	Rating
Aftonbladet	4/5 stars
Expressen	5/5 stars
Nöjesguiden	(Positive)
NA	4/5 stars

Mazarin was well received by Swedish publications, with Aftonbladet and Expressen both highly praising the album.

== Track listing ==
1. "Vilket håll du än går" — 3:18
2. "Om du bara vill" — 3:47
3. "På promenad genom stan" — 3:21
4. "Smakar på ett regn" — 3:27
5. "Gungar" — 3:37
6. "Födelsedag" — 3:13
7. "Sakta mina steg" — 2:35
8. "Tycker om när du tar på mej" — 3:27
9. "Spegelboll" — 3:31
10. "För bra för att vara sant" — 3:29
11. "Här kommer alla känslorna (på en och samma gång)" — 2:43
12. "Jag tror du bär på en stor hemlighet" — 3:59
13. "Varmt igen" — 4:21
14. "Mazarin" (instrumental) — 3:23

== Charts ==
=== Weekly charts ===
Chart (2003)	Peak position
Norwegian Albums (VG-lista)	1
Swedish Albums (Sverigetopplistan)	1

=== Year-end charts ===
Chart (2003)	Position
Swedish Albums (Sverigetopplistan)	1
Chart (2004)	Position
Swedish Albums (Sverigetopplistan)	13

== Certifications and sales ==
Region	Certification	Certified units/sales
Sweden (GLF)	5× Platinum	330,000
