= Scener =

Scener (1985 Album)

Studio album by Per Gessle
- Released: 25 October 1985
- Recorded: November 1984–June 1985: EMI studios (Stockholm); Studio 38 (Getinge)
- Genre: Pop
- Label: EMI
- Producer: Per Gessle, Lasse Lindbom

Per Gessle chronology
Per Gessle (1983)	Scener (1985 Album) (1985)	På väg, 1982-86 (1992)

Scener is the second solo release from Swedish pop singer and songwriter Per Gessle, released on 25 October 1985. The album peaked at number 39 on the Swedish Albums Chart.

== Track listing ==
LP/MC
Side-A

All tracks are written by Per Gessle

No.	Title	Length
1.	"Galning"	4:17
2.	"Rickie Lee"	2:58
3.	"Lycklig en stund"	2:20
4.	"Väntat så länge"	4:40
5.	"Inte tillsammans, inte isär"	3:01
6.	"Viskar"	5:31

Side-B

No.	Title	Length
7.	"Blå december"	5:31
8.	"Den tunna linjen"	2:50
9.	"Kapten"	4:55
10.	"Speedo"	3:17
11.	"Scen"	0:42
12.	"Om jag en dag"	5:26

1994 CD re-release - bonus tracks
No.	Title	Length
13.	"Tänd ett ljus"	3:54
14.	"Ute på landet"	3:18
15.	"Mandolindagar"	3:16
16.	"Farväl Angelina"	3:43

== Personnel ==
- Per Gessle: Vocals, Guitars, Piano, Synthesizers
- Erik Borelius, Nane Kvillsater, Janne Oldaeus, Pelle Siren: Guitars
- Mats Persson: Guitars, Piano, Synthesizer, Organ
- Goran Fritzson: Synthesizers
- Erik Strandh: Accordion
- Anders Herrlin: Bass, Synthesizers
- Janne Kling: Flute
- Erik Hausler: Tenor and Soprano Sax
- Christina Puchlinger: Harp
- Micke Andersson, Rolf Alex: Drums, Percussion
- Strings arranged by Backa Hans Eriksson
- Anne-Lie Rydé, Marie Fredriksson, Monica Törnell: Vocals

== Charts ==
Chart (1985)	Peak position
Swedish Albums (Sverigetopplistan)	39
