= Per Gessle (album) =

Studio album by Per Gessle
- Released: 8 April 1983; 1 September 1992 (Re-release)
- Recorded: 1982–1983
- Studio: EMI Studios (Stockholm)
- Genre: Pop
- Label: EMI
- Producer: Lasse Lindbom

Per Gessle chronology
Per Gessle (1983)	Scener (1985)

Per Gessle was released on 8 April 1983 and is the debut solo studio album from Swedish pop artist Per Gessle. The album peaked at number five on the Swedish Albums Chart. Before releasing this album, Gessle was already a famous lead vocalist of the Swedish pop band Gyllene Tider. A re-release on CD, released on 1 September 1992, contained three bonus tracks.

Marie Fredriksson contributed back-up vocals for song 2 and lead vocals for (duets) the songs 3, 11 and 12.

== Track listings ==
=== LP/MC ===
- Side A
1. "På väg"
2. "Hjärtats trakt"
3. "Om du har lust"
4. "Timmar av iver"
5. "Regn"
6. "Indiansommar" (instrumental)
7. "Historier vi kan"
- Side B
1. "Ledmotiv från Indiansommar" (instrumental)
2. "Den öde stranden"
3. "Fiskarnas tecken"
4. "Rädd"
5. "Tända en sticka till"
6. "Syrenernas tid"

=== CD ===
1. "På väg"
2. "Hjärtats trakt"
3. "Om du har lust"
4. "Timmar av iver"
5. "Regn"
6. "Indiansommar" (instrumental)
7. "Historier vi kan"
8. "Ledmotiv från Indiansommar" (instrumental)
9. "Den öde stranden"
10. "Fiskarnas tecken"
11. "Rädd"
12. "Tända en sticka till"
13. "Syrenernas tid"
14. "Överallt" (CD bonus track)
15. "Man varnade för halka" (CD bonus track)
16. "När morgonen kommer" (CD bonus track)

== Charts ==
Chart (1983)	Peak position
Swedish Albums (Sverigetopplistan)	5
