= Per Gessle =

Swedish musician and songwriter (born 1959)

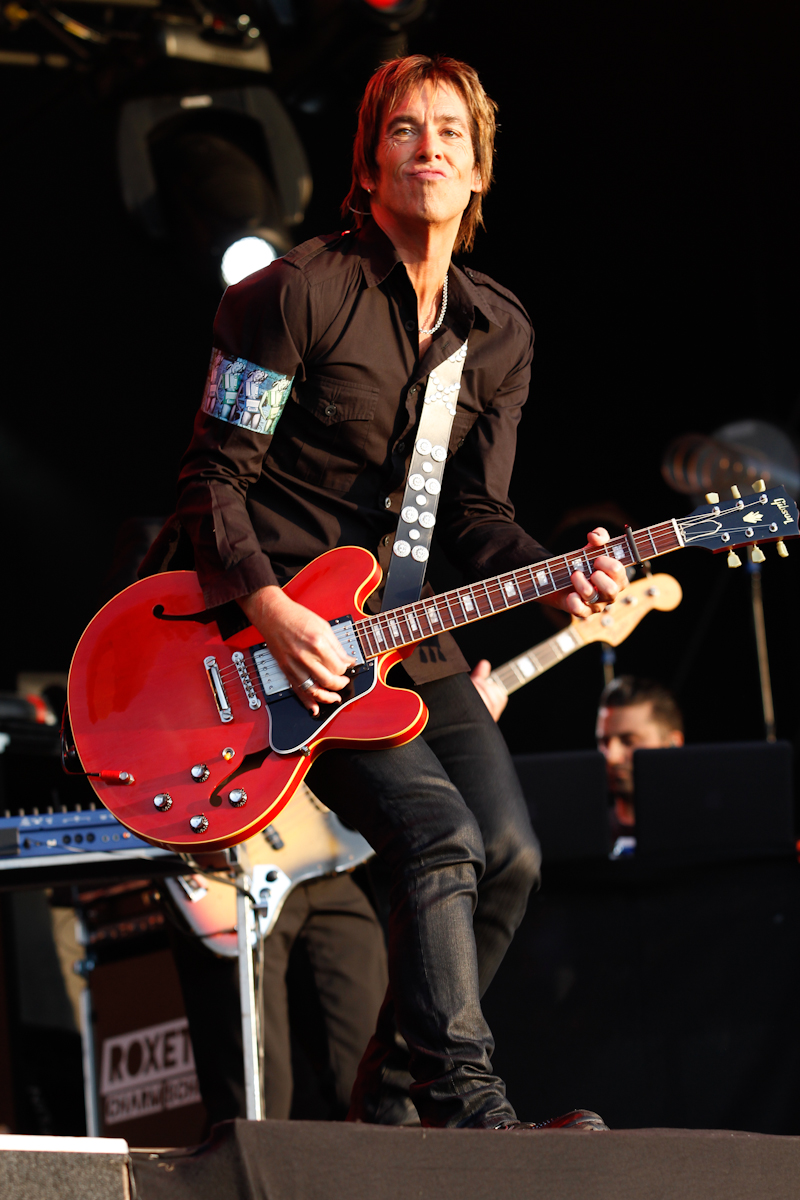
- Gessle performing in 2011

Background information
- Born: Per Håkan Gessle; 12 January 1959 (age 67); Halmstad, Sweden
- Genres: Pop; rock; dance
- Occupations: Musician; songwriter
- Instruments: Vocals; guitar
- Years active: 1976–present
- Labels: EMI; Sony; Fundamental
- Formerly of: Roxette; Gyllene Tider

Per Håkan Gessle (Swedish pronunciation: [ˈpæːr ˈhôːkan ˈɡɛ̂sːlɛ]; born 12 January 1959) is a Swedish singer, songwriter and guitarist. He is best known as the male half and primary songwriter of the pop rock duo Roxette, which he formed with Marie Fredriksson in 1986 and which was disbanded after her death in 2019. The duo achieved international success in the late 1980s and early 1990s with their albums Look Sharp! (1988) and Joyride (1991), and topped the charts in the US four times, most notably with "It Must Have Been Love" which was featured in the film Pretty Woman. Prior to the formation of Roxette, he had a successful career in his native Sweden as the frontman for Gyllene Tider. The band released three number-one albums during the early 1980s but disbanded shortly after their fourth album, The Heartland Café (1984).

In-between periods in Roxette and Gyllene Tider reunions, Gessle recorded numerous solo albums, both in Swedish and English. After Fredriksson's illness in 2002 he released Mazarin (2003). The album was a critical and commercial success for Gessle and started the beginning of a long-term collaboration with the backing vocalist Helena Josefsson. With Fredriksson's continued treatment and recuperation he made three more albums, Son of a Plumber (2005), En händig man (A handy man, 2007) and Party Crasher (2008).

After Roxette's Neverending World Tour finished in 2015 he produced another set of solo efforts, En vacker natt (2017), En vacker dag (2017) and Small Town Talk (2018). In 2016 he started using the pseudonym Mono Mind, first releasing a few singles before delivering a full album, Mind Control, in 2019. Gessle was the main songwriter for both Roxette and Gyllene Tider.

== Career ==
Per Gessle was a founding member of Gyllene Tider, in 1976. They quickly became a popular group in Sweden, but after their fourth album, The Heartland Café (1984), sold poorly compared to their previous albums, the group disbanded. Gessle wrote. "We decided to put Gyllene Tider to rest... until further notice." In 1982, Gessle released his first solo album, Per Gessle and after Gyllene Tider split-up his second album, Scener, quickly appeared in 1985.

Gessle and Marie Fredriksson had been friends for a few years before they came together as Roxette in 1986. After the success of their first hit "Neverending Love", which was written by Gessle, they quickly recorded Pearls of Passion using material which was originally intended for Per's third solo album. Roxette went on to achieve four U.S. #1's and two #2's, with their albums Look Sharp! and Joyride attaining platinum status in a number of countries. Gessle sang lead vocals on several Roxette songs, including "The Look" (1988), "Joyride" (1991), "Vulnerable" (1993), and "June Afternoon" (1995). After Roxette's early nineties success, Per released a demo compilation album in 1992, På väg, 1982–86. After the release of Crash! Boom! Bang! and subsequent world tour, Roxette took a break.

In 1996, after a reunion and subsequent tour of Gyllene Tider, Gessle recorded his first English solo album, using Brainpool and Gyllene Tider as backing musicians. Christoffer Lundquist from Brainpool would also come to collaborate with Gessle on later releases. The World According to Gessle, released in 1997, produced three singles, "Do You Wanna Be My Baby?", "Kix" and "I Want You to Know". The videos to all three songs were directed by Jonas Åkerlund. The album was re-released in 2008, with extra bonus material and demos. In 1997 Hjärtats trakt – en samling was released as a best-of album.

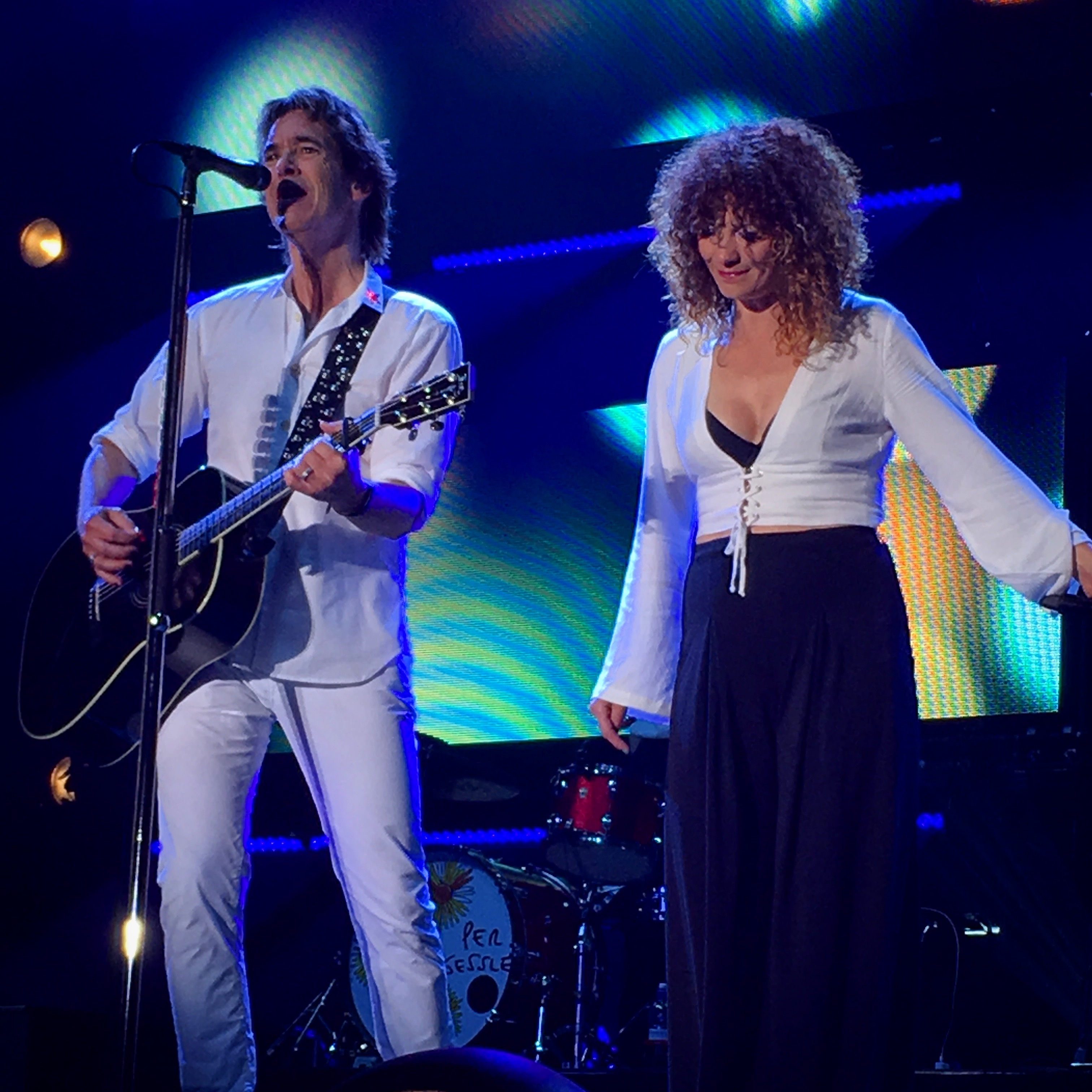
Gessle with singer Helena Josefsson during his 2017 En vacker kväll tour of Sweden

After Roxette released Have a Nice Day (1999) and Room Service (2001) to moderate success, Fredriksson collapsed and was diagnosed with a brain tumor in 2002. While Fredriksson received treatment for her illness, Gessle continued with his solo work. The subsequent album Mazarin (2003), was a critical and commercial success in Sweden and started the beginning of a long-term collaboration with the backing vocalist Helena Josefsson. Lundquist, now Gessle's producer was looking for a female singer and picked Josefsson.

She first came to the attention of Lundquist after she and her band Sandy Mouche wanted to record at Lundquist's Aerosol Grey Machine (AGM) studio. "I remember driving a car between Lund and Lomma when Christoffer called and wondered if I was interested in starting singing with Per who wanted a girl for his solo projects.", recalled Josefsson. Mazarin topped the charts in June 2003, going five times platinum in 2004. The lead single from the album "Här kommer alla känslorna (på en och samma gång)" ("Here comes all the emotions (at the same time)"), is Gessle's most successful song in his home country, spending two months at No. 1 and was certified platinum.

Following the success of the album, Gessle won numerous awards; four Grammis awards: Best Artist, Best Male Pop Performer, Best Composer and Best Song, three Rockbjörnen awards: Best Swedish Male Artist, Best Swedish Album and Best Swedish Song, and a Guldälgen (The Golden Moose) Award for Best Song.

Also in 2004, saw Gessle and Gyllene Tider reunite for a 25th-anniversary celebration that included the band's first album in 20 years, Finn 5 fel!, and another very successful tour in Sweden. They beat the Ullevi stadium attendance record, which was later broken by fellow Swede Håkan Hellström in 2016 (70,144), and the band played to almost half a million fans. As a result, the group was honoured with four awards in Sweden.

With Son of a Plumber, he continued his association with other Swedish artists. Jens Jansson along with previous collaborators Josefsson and Lundquist, helped Gessle create his second English album. Released in November 2005, the album contains a song dedicated to Gessle's father who was a plumber, "Kurt – The Fastest Plumber in the West". The album which was certified platinum, was released in several other European countries in April 2006. In June 2007, he released another solo album in Swedish with the name En händig man, which shipped three times platinum. A single of the same name was released; "En händig man". In October 2007, a book of "Att vara Per Gessle" was published, telling some of the unknown facts about Gessle and his 30-year career.

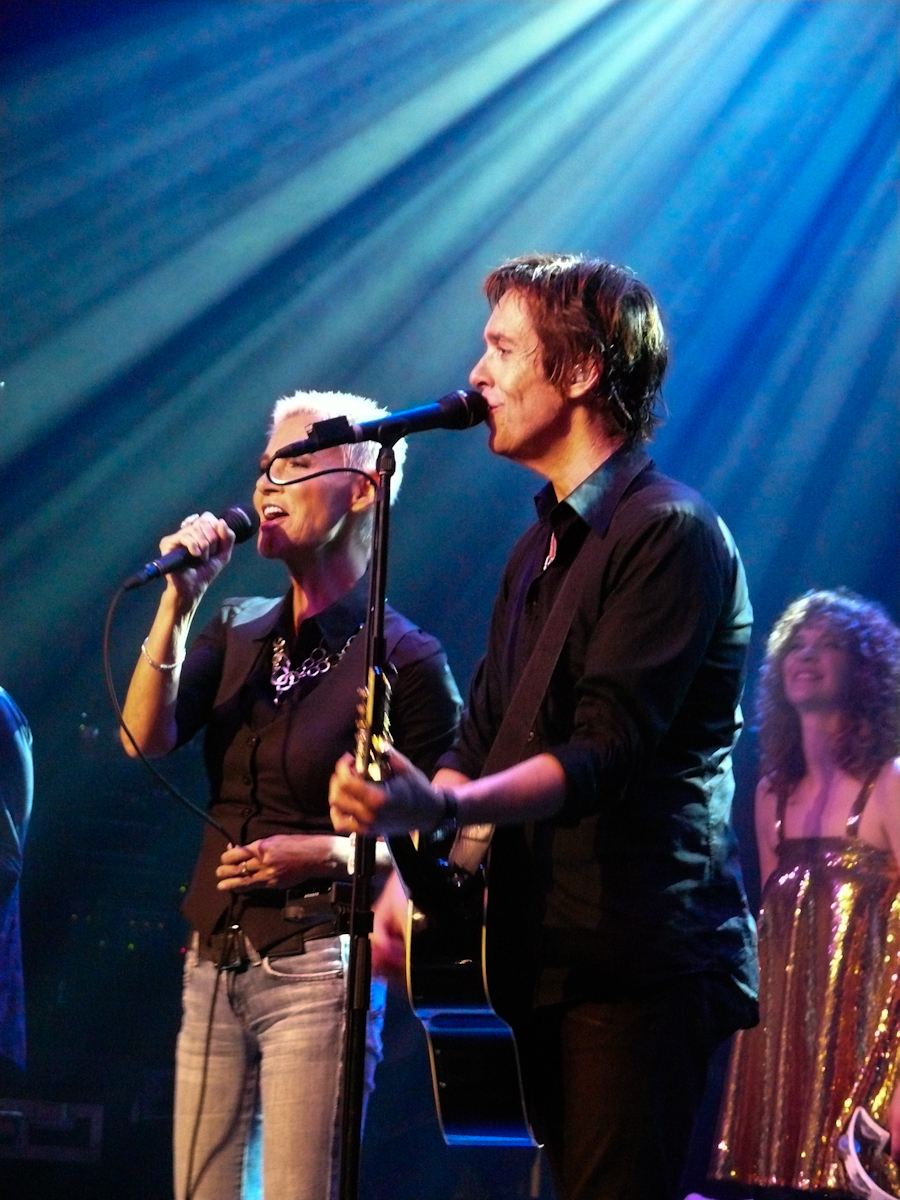
Roxette onstage in Amsterdam, May 2009

Party Crasher his seventh solo album and third in English was released in late 2008. The first single "Silly Really" gave him his fourth No. 1 hit. After that, Gessle started his Party Crasher Tour, where Fredriksson joined him on stage twice, in Amsterdam and Stockholm. This was eight years after their last live performance together during Roxette's Room Service Tour in 2001. Following Fredriksson's guest appearance in Amsterdam, Roxette started to perform live again. Initially this was during the Night of the Proms concert series in Belgium, the Netherlands and Germany in 2009, later followed by extensive concert tours in 2010, 2011 and 2012, performing over 100 shows on all 6 continents. In the summer of 2013, Gessle reunited with Gyllene Tider once more, performing some 20 shows in Sweden.

After Roxette's Neverending World Tour finished in 2015 he produced another set of solo efforts, En vacker natt (2017), En vacker dag (2017) and Small Town Talk (2018). All three albums were recorded in Nashville after Gessle felt the need to do sessions abroad. The albums featured the use of local musicians, Dan Dugmore, Stuart Duncan and Mickey Raphael.

In 2016 he started using the pseudonym Mono Mind, first releasing a few singles before delivering a full album, Mind Control, in 2019. In June 2022, Gessle released a single called "The Loneliest Girl In The World" under the name PG Roxette. The single previews an album Gessle has recorded with members of Roxette's live touring band called Pop-up Dynamo.

=== Collaborations ===
In 1983 Gessle wrote the song ”Stjärnhimmel” to Elisabeth Andreassen.

He wrote the song Kärleken är evig which Lena Philipsson competed with in Melodifestivalen 1986, where the song finished in second place with 42 points. The song charted on the 6th place on the Swedish singles chart and became Philipsson's big breakthrough single.

In 1990, Gessle wrote a single, "The Sweet Hello, The Sad Goodbye", for Thomas Anders (of Modern Talking fame); Roxette would release their version as the B-side of their single "Spending My Time". The song was also used by Laura Branigan featuring on her Over My Heart album. He has also participated with the Swedish singer Nisse Hellberg in the project The Lonely Boys. In 1996 he worked with Belinda Carlisle and wrote two songs for her album, A Woman and a Man; "Always Breaking My Heart" and "Love Doesn't Live Here". The former was released as a single, becoming a UK top 10 hit.

He sang a duet with Nick Lowe on the title track for the Small Town Talk album.

Gessle was involved in the development of the Roxette jukebox musical Joyride the Musical which premiered at Malmö Opera in 2024.

== Personal life ==
Gessle is the youngest son of plumber Kurt Gessle (1917–1978) and Elisabeth Gessle (1925–2013). He had an older brother, Bengt (1951–2014) and older sister Gunilla (1944–2016). Gessle married his long-time girlfriend Åsa Nordin (born 1961) in 1993 at Västra Strö Church, Eslöv, Sweden. The wedding reception was held in nearby Trollenäs Castle. They have a son, Gabriel Titus, born on 5 August 1997.

Along with Björn Nordstrand he also owns Hotel Tylösand on the Swedish westcoast, known for its vast art and photo collection as well as The Joyride Car Collection, Per Gessle's private collection of Ferrari cars.

== Discography ==
- Per Gessle (1983)
- Scener (1985)
- The World According to Gessle (1997)
- Mazarin (2003)
- Son of a Plumber (as Son of a Plumber) (2005)
- En händig man (2007)
- Party Crasher (2008)
- En vacker natt (2017)
- En vacker dag (2017)
- Small Town Talk (2018)
- Mind Control (as Mono Mind) (2019)
- Gammal kärlek rostar aldrig (2020)
- Pop-Up Dynamo! (as PG Roxette) (2022)
- Sällskapssjuk (2024)
