= One Wish (Roxette song) =

2006 single by Roxette

Single by Roxette

from the album A Collection of Roxette Hits: Their 20 Greatest Songs!
- Released: 9 October 2006
- Recorded: June 2006
- Studio: The Aerosol Grey Machine, Skåne
- Genre: Pop rock
- Length: 3:01
- Label: Roxette Recordings; Capitol
- Songwriter: Per Gessle
- Producers: Clarence Öfwerman; Gessle; Christoffer Lundquist

Roxette singles chronology
"Opportunity Nox" (2003)	"One Wish" (2006)	"Reveal" (2007)

Music video
- "One Wish" on YouTube

"One Wish" is a song by Swedish pop music duo Roxette, released on 9 October 2006 as the lead single from the duo's fourth greatest hits compilation album, A Collection of Roxette Hits: Their 20 Greatest Songs! It was recorded in June 2006, and was one of the first songs recorded by the duo since vocalist Marie Fredriksson's brain tumour diagnosis in 2002. Longtime collaborator Jonas Åkerlund directed the song's music video. The single performed well in several territories, particularly in Scandinavia. It ended 2006 as one of the twenty best-selling singles in Sweden.

== Background and recording ==
Written by Per Gessle and produced by him with frequent collaborators Clarence Öfwerman and Christoffer Lundquist, the song was recorded in June 2006 at The Aerosol Grey Machine in Skåne. It was one of the first songs recorded by the duo since vocalist Marie Fredriksson's brain tumour diagnosis in 2002. Gessle described the song as an uptempo duet.

== Release and promotion ==
The single is backed by several b-sides, including a megamix of several previously released singles. "The Rox Medley" was arranged, produced and mixed by Lundquist, Öfwerman and Jimmy Monell, and is made up of portions of "The Look", "Joyride", "Listen To Your Heart", "Dangerous", "It Must Have Been Love" and "Fading Like a Flower (Every Time You Leave)". It had been released earlier in 2006 through digital retailers such as iTunes. Also included on the maxi single was the original 1987 single "It Must Have Been Love (Christmas for the Broken Hearted)", along with its original b-side, the Fredriksson-composed "Turn to Me".

Jonas Åkerlund directed the song's music video. It was a mixture of new and old images, taken from numerous other music videos created by Roxette over the years. The single performed well in Scandinavian territories. On the Swedish airplay chart Svensktoppen, it peaked at number three, and reached number two on the national Sverigetopplistan sales chart. It ended 2006 as the 18th best-selling single in the country. It also peaked within the top five on the Finnish Singles Chart, and at number three in Spain. It charted moderately in several European territories, reaching number 50 in Germany, and number 56 in both Austria and Switzerland.

== Formats and track listings ==
All lyrics by Per Gessle; all music by Gessle, except "Turn to Me" by Marie Fredriksson.

- CD Single (Europe 3718902)
1. "One Wish" – 3:04
2. "The Rox Medley" – 4:40
- CD Maxi
1. "One Wish" – 3:04
2. "The Rox Medley" – 4:40
3. "It Must Have Been Love (Christmas for the Broken Hearted)" – 4:48
4. "Turn to Me" – 2:58

== Personnel ==
Credits adapted from the liner notes of A Collection of Roxette Hits: Their 20 Greatest Songs!.

- Recorded at The Aerosol Grey Machine, Skåne, Sweden in June 2006
- Mixed by Christoffer Lundquist

Musicians

- Marie Fredriksson — lead and background vocals
- Per Gessle — lead and background vocals, production
- Jens Jansson — drums
- Christoffer Lundquist — background vocals, electric and bass guitars, synthesizer, programming, engineering, production
- Clarence Öfwerman — synthesizer, programming, production

== Charts ==
=== Weekly charts ===
Chart (2006)	Peak position
Austria (Ö3 Austria Top 40)	56
Czech Republic (Rádio – Top 100)	43
European Hot 100 (Billboard)	33
Finland (Suomen virallinen lista)	5
Germany (GfK)	50
Netherlands (Single Top 100)	96
Portugal (Portuguese Singles Chart)	14
Russian Airplay (Tophit)	103
Spain (PROMUSICAE)	3
Sweden (Sverigetopplistan)	2
Switzerland (Schweizer Hitparade)	56

=== Year-end charts ===
Chart (2006)	Position
Swedish Singles (Sverigetopplistan)	18
