= Why Don't You Bring Me Flowers? =

2016 single by Roxette

Single by Roxette

from the album Good Karma
- Released: 4 November 2016
- Length: 3:33
- Label: Roxette Recordings; Parlophone
- Songwriter(s): Per Gessle
- Producer(s): Clarence Öfwerman; Christoffer Lundquist; Gessle; Addeboy vs. Cliff (single version)

Roxette singles chronology
"Some Other Summer" (2016)	"Why Don't You Bring Me Flowers?" (2016)	"Let Your Heart Dance with Me" (2020)

Music video
- "Why Don't You Bring Me Flowers?" on YouTube

"Why Don't You Bring Me Flowers?" is a song by Swedish pop music duo Roxette, released on 4 November 2016 as the third and final single from their tenth studio album, Good Karma. Originally composed by Per Gessle as an uptempo song, the track was recorded as a ballad on the advice of vocalist Marie Fredriksson. For its single release, the song was remixed by Good Karma co-producers Addeboy vs. Cliff, who restored the original tempo. The original album version of the track received positive reviews, with several reviewers referring to it as one of the best ballads ever recorded by Roxette while noting its similarity to the work of Enya. It is the duo's final single to be released during Fredriksson's lifetime.

== Background and recording ==
The track was one of the final songs Per Gessle wrote for Good Karma. He said it was originally composed as an "uptempo number, and we recorded the demo accordingly. But in the studio, Marie [Fredriksson] wanted to try it as a ballad, which worked astonishingly well. So we used that on the album." The backing track of the album version uses a piano as its foundation, with the melody of the choruses augmented by the use of a string section. The intro and first verse consist of a repeated Fm–D♭–A♭–E♭ pattern, while the first chorus is made up of B♭–Gm–F–Fm–Cm–Gm–F. The post-chorus bridge and all subsequent sections consist of the repeated Fm–D♭–A♭–E♭ pattern, frequently amended upwards by a third of an octave; Fredriksson's vocal range on the track spans over three octaves, from a B2 in the first verse to a C5 in the final chorus.

The single version was remixed by Swedish production duo Addeboy vs. Cliff, who co-produced several tracks on Good Karma. Gessle said the remix kept the original vocals, but that Addeboy vs. Cliff "basically redid everything else. It became a new song—much more in line with the original idea."

== Release and promotion ==
The song was released digitally in EP format on 4 November 2016, as the third and final single from Good Karma. Along with the single and album versions of the track, as well as an additional remix created by Patrick Jordan, the EP contains the original ballad version of album track "From a Distance", as produced by Gessle, Clarence Öfwerman and Christoffer Lundquist; it was an Addeboy vs. Cliff remix of that track which appeared on Good Karma.

A music video was created for "Why Don't You Bring Me Flowers?". It was assembled using footage uploaded by fans to the band's official website. The video was inspired by and features footage uploaded by a Polish couple, who received death threats after creating a similar video for Roxette's previous single "Some Other Summer". Roxette's long-time manager Marie Dimberg confirmed both Marie and Per watched the fan-made video for "Some Other Summer", and personally expressed regret over the "wave of criticism" the couple received in their native Poland.

== Critical reception ==
In their review of Good Karma, Swedish publication Aftonbladet described "Why Don't You Bring Me Flowers?" as one of the album's best tracks, saying that along with "It Just Happens" and album closer "April Clouds", the song contained a "familiar and poignant melancholy." Cryptic Rock also noted the "poignancy" of the song, which they said had "the power to prick the hearts of lovers as well as the broken-hearted." Renowned for Sound called the song a "gem", praising the "beautiful" piano arrangement and "subtle string section flowing throughout". They went on to compliment Fredriksson's vocals, describing her delivery as "heartfelt" and "sublime."

Radio Crème Brûlée said it was "Tinged with melancholia [and] earnest longing", describing it as one of the best songs on the album and one of the "most accomplished ballads" Roxette ever produced. They complimented Fredriksson's "achingly restrained and hypnotic" vocals, as well as the arrangement, which they compared to an adrenaline-fueled Enya. Despite this, they complained the song was too short, saying it ends "just as Marie's truly wonderful vocal makes way and the orchestra is let loose." They went on to compare the track to Freiheit's "Keeping the Dream Alive" and Erasure's "Am I Right?", saying that these songs contained "enough sparkle that if released in December would sail up the festive charts despite being completely unrelated to Christmas."

== Track listing ==
- Digital download
1. "Why Don't You Bring Me Flowers?" (Addeboy vs. Cliff Remix) – 3:49
2. "Why Don't You Bring Me Flowers?" (Patrick Jordan Remix) – 3:18
3. "Why Don't You Bring Me Flowers?" (Original Version) – 3:33
4. "From a Distance" (SingSing Version) – 3:36
