= Good Karma =

2016 album by Roxette

Studio album by Roxette
- Released: 3 June 2016
- Recorded: May 2014 – February 2016
- Studio: Tits & Ass, Halmstad; The Aerosol Grey Machine, Scania; Vinden, Djursholm; GB17, Täby
- Genre: Electronic
- Length: 38:09
- Label: Roxette Recordings; Parlophone
- Producer: Per Gessle; Christoffer Lundquist; Clarence Öfwerman; Addeboy vs. Cliff

Roxette chronology
The RoxBox! (2015)	Good Karma (2016)	Bag of Trix (2020)

Singles from Good Karma
- 1. "It Just Happens" Released: 8 April 2016; 2. "Some Other Summer" Released: 17 June 2016; 3. "Why Don't You Bring Me Flowers?" Released: 4 November 2016

Good Karma is the tenth studio album by Roxette, a Swedish pop rock duo consisting of Marie Fredriksson and Per Gessle. Released on 3 June 2016 by Roxette Recordings and Parlophone, it was the only album issued by the duo under an international recording contract signed with Parlophone's parent company Warner Music Group. The album was produced by Gessle alongside Christoffer Lundquist and Clarence Öfwerman, with co-production on several tracks by Addeboy vs. Cliff, among others.

Good Karma was recorded over a period of nearly two years, with its recording frequently interrupted by The Neverending World Tour. The tour ran from 2009 until the beginning of 2016, when Fredriksson was advised by her doctors to cease all touring activity due to poor health. The album is more electronic than the duo's previous releases, with Gessle saying he was inspired by the thought of not having to perform the songs live, choosing instead to focus on creating more electronic and complicated compositions.

A Sebastien Drums remix of "Some Other Summer" preceded the release of Good Karma by several months, being followed by the lead single "It Just Happens" on 8 April 2016. EPs were issued for subsequent singles "Some Other Summer" and "Why Don't You Bring Me Flowers?" on 17 June and 4 November 2016, respectively. A fan-made video for the Roxette version of "Some Other Summer" became a viral hit after it was publicised via Roxette's social media accounts. The video proved controversial in Poland, with the couple who created it receiving death threats.

The album received mostly positive reviews from music critics, with a number of them praising Gessle's songwriting and Fredriksson's vocal performance, and describing it as a fitting end to Roxette's career. However, others complained about the overtly electronic production. The album also performed well commercially, debuting at number one in the Czech Republic as well as number two in Switzerland and the duo's native Sweden, and was their highest-charting studio album since the 1990s in both Australia and the United Kingdom.

== Background and recording ==
Good Karma features production contributions from Swedish duo Addeboy vs. Cliff, with whom Roxette had collaborated on a 2015 remix of "The Look". Roxette songwriter Per Gessle said he sought to integrate an additional musician or collaborator into every album he released, explaining this was done "just to make everyone – myself included – stand on our toes. I always welcome change if it's [for] the right reason." He noted in the case of Good Karma that "new blood definitely needed to be injected everywhere", but said the album would be produced by him alongside regular contributors Clarence Öfwerman and Christoffer Lundquist. "The Look (2015 Remake)" was used by a Swedish fashion company in a prominent advertising campaign during the Autumn of 2015, with Gessle saying Roxette was collaborating with numerous producers and remixers for their upcoming studio album, indicating a new single would be released before the end of the year. A remix of new Roxette track "Some Other Summer" – created by French producer Sebastien Drums – was released on 6 November 2015 along with a music video.

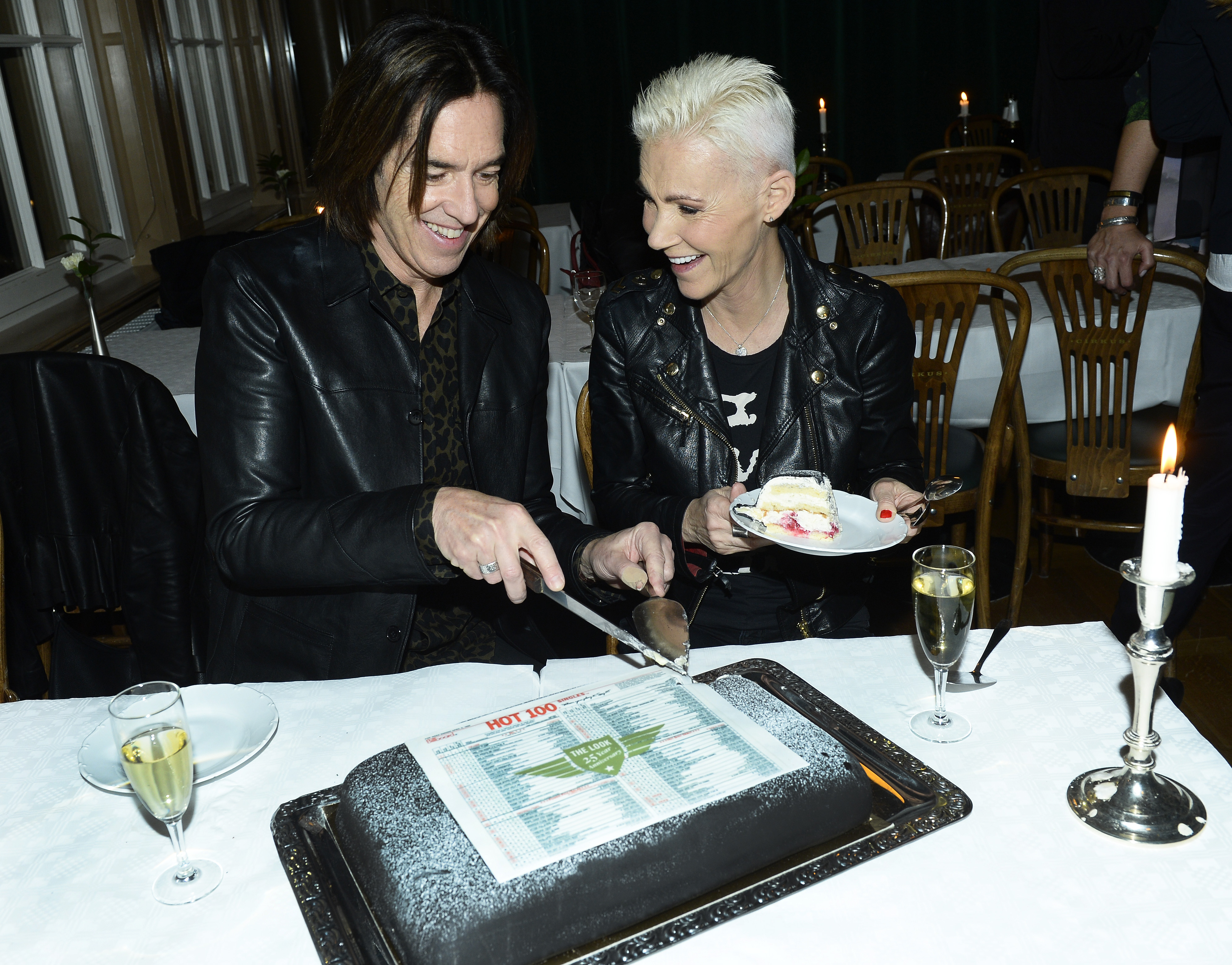
Per Gessle (left) and Marie Fredriksson (right) photographed in 2014, the same year they began recording Good Karma.

Gessle said he wanted Good Karma to sound like an updated album that leaned toward a "classic Roxette tradition", elaborating: "[W]e wanted to combine our classic Roxette sound with a modern and slightly unpredictable production to create a soundscape where you would both recognise our sound and find something new." The album is more electronic than the duo's previous releases. Gessle said he began work on it knowing the material would never be performed live, a situation he found inspiring, as he could create elaborate electronic tracks in the studio instead of focusing on how the songs would translate to a live, guitar-orientated setting. Lead singer Marie Fredriksson's brain tumour diagnosis in 2002 made it difficult for her to memorise the lyrics to new songs, so The Neverending World Tour consisted primarily of Roxette's greatest hits. The tour began with the band's performances at the 2009 edition of the Night of the Proms festival.

Good Karma was recorded over a period of nearly two years; Gessle said recording was frequently disrupted by the duo's touring schedule. Unlike previous albums Charm School (2011) and Travelling (2012) – which both made usage of old ideas – Gessle confirmed every song on Good Karma was written specifically for the album, saying it became a "more cohesive production" as a result. Despite this, album closer "April Clouds" is based on the lyric "Wish You the Best", a song from Gessle's 1997 solo album The World According to Gessle. Two outtakes from Good Karma were issued as singles from Roxette's 2020 compilation Bag of Trix—"Let Your Heart Dance with Me" and "Piece of Cake".

== Release and artwork ==
"It Just Happens" was released as the lead single from Good Karma on 8 April 2016, the duo's first release under a new deal signed with Warner Music Group. Its music video was directed by Tobias Leo Nordquist and released on 20 May. The cover artwork for the album was designed to mimic the imagery of a butterfly. Good Karma was released on 3 June 2016, with a limited edition translucent orange-coloured vinyl being issued as Roxette's final studio album. The release was timed to coincide with the scheduled opening concert of the final leg of The Neverending World Tour in 2016. This final leg was cancelled after Fredriksson was advised by her doctors to stop touring due to poor health. Fredriksson sent a thank you message to fans for their kind wishes, in which she said: "Sadly, now my touring days are over and I want to take this opportunity to thank our wonderful fans that [have] followed us on our long and winding journey." She said she looked forward to the release of Good Karma, describing it as "our best album ever." She died in 2019 due to complications stemming from her brain tumour diagnosis in 2002.

An EP for the album's second single, "Some Other Summer", was released on 17 June 2016. An official music video was not created for the original version of the song; instead a lyric video was uploaded to YouTube on 29 June. A fan-made video for the track became a viral hit after Roxette shared it via their official social media accounts. The video proved controversial in Poland, with the couple who created it receiving death threats. An EP of "Why Don't You Bring Me Flowers?" was released as the third and final single from the album on 4 November 2016, containing an exclusive single remix of the song created by Addeboy vs. Cliff. A music video for the song was created using footage uploaded by fans to Roxette's official website as part of a contest. The video was inspired by and contains footage from the Polish couple who created the video to "Some Other Summer". Marie and Per expressed regret over the "wave of criticism" the couple received in Poland.

== Critical reception ==
Professional ratings
Review scores
Source	Rating
Aftonbladet	3/5 stars
AllMusic	3/5 stars
Expressen	3/5 stars
Gaffa	3/6 stars
Göteborgs-Posten	2/5 stars
laut.de	3/5 stars
Renowned for Sound	5/5 stars
The Music	3/5 stars
Stuff	2/5 stars
Upsala Nya Tidning	5/5 stars

Good Karma was met with mostly positive reviews from music critics. A writer for Upsala Nya Tidning praised the production, which they said contains "a certain retro feeling [...] but also features the ethereal and dreamy sound of some of Gessle's solo records (with echoes of Cocteau Twins)". The writer complimented it for containing "smart choruses and nice details from pop history", before concluding that if Good Karma was their final record, Roxette were ending with "their flag flying high". Brendon Veevers of Renowned for Sound gave a glowing review, saying it contains some of the best material Roxette released in the latter part of their career. Writing for Cryptic Rock, Alfie Vera Mella described the album as being a "perfect" release to celebrate the duo's 30th anniversary, while Tyler McLoughlan of The Music praised Gessle's songwriting for an abundance of hooks.

The staff of Mittelbayerische Zeitung rated the album "impressive", praising "Why Dontcha?" and "From a Distance", while laut.de writer Kai Butterweck said: "Good Karma isn't a record that will change the pop world, but a solid nod to the past." He elaborated by stating that "Marie and Per pop their way through their own archive quite solidly". Despite this, Butterweck said "A little less synthetics in the sound would have done the album good. But by and large, Roxette still sound like Roxette in 2016." Similarly, Stephen Thomas Erlewine of AllMusic complimented the album for an increase in tempo as compared to the rest of their later work, but said on Good Karma the duo "deliberately excise the fizziness that fueled their big hits all in a conscious attempt to play toward their middle age. In that regard, Good Karma is a success—it's a mature Roxette album that doesn't disavow their past—but it's hard not to miss the bubblegum Euro style of Look Sharp!"

The record received some mixed reviews as well. Nils Hansson of Dagens Nyheter said Gessle and the producers sought to appeal too much to young Electropop fans, "with digital loops, EDM beats, autotune voice and rave synths". Hansson additionally complained Fredriksson did not contribute vocals to more songs. Gaffa reviewer Jesper Robild argued Roxette initially found success as a result of their songwriting talent and criticized the amount of producers credited, saying: "More people than usual are involved, and Good Karma is obviously coloured by today's pop and dance music. Gone are all the interesting distorted guitars and drums, replaced by new elements such as electronic beats, Auto-Tune/vocoder and similar unbecoming ingredients." Despite this, he praised Fredriksson's performance and said the album would have sounded better with more organic instrumentation. Stuff writer Hannah McKee said Good Karma plays like a "jumbled archive of pop music from the '80s, '90s and '00s, jam-packed with as many different pop trends as possible", but went on to compliment Fredriksson's vocals, saying her voice is at times reminiscent of her performance on "It Must Have Been Love" (1990). She described "April Clouds" as "the most emotionally invested" song on the record.

Although the staff of Göteborgs-Posten also gave the record a mixed review, they too praised Fredriksson's performance, saying the album is best when the tempo "slows down" and she takes "center-stage" on the ballads such as "April Clouds". They dubbed the song the "finest" track on the album, describing it as what "in perfect balance manages to combine Per and Marie's love for the early American and Swedish 70's sound that made Roxette something out of the ordinary [in the first place]." Other publications that commented on "April Clouds" included Expressen, with Anders Nunstedt dubbing it one of the album's best tracks, while Markus Larsson of Sweden's biggest newspaper Aftonbladet said the song acts as a "beautiful goodbye" if this is their final record.

== Commercial performance ==
Good Karma peaked at number two in the duo's native Sweden, held off the top spot by Volbeat's Seal the Deal & Let's Boogie. The album debuted atop the Czech Albums Chart, standing as their first number one in the country since Charm School in 2011. Good Karma debuted at number two in Switzerland, where it was held off the top spot by Seal the Deal & Let's Boogie. It also made the top 10 in Austria, Hungary and Spain. In Germany, Good Karma debuted at number 11, making it Roxette's first release since their second studio album Look Sharp! (1988) in 1989 to peak outside the top 10 of the German Albums Chart. The album performed poorly in Denmark, where it debuted at number 52 with sales of just 168 copies.

Good Karma became the first Roxette studio album to enter the top 100 in the United Kingdom since 1999's Have a Nice Day, debuting at number 61 on the UK Albums Chart with first week sales of 1,682 copies. It attained a higher peak position on the Scottish Albums Chart, debuting at number 44. In Australia, the album entered and peaked at number 25, the duo's highest placement there for a studio album since Crash! Boom! Bang! in 1994.

== Track listing ==
All lyrics are written by Per Gessle; all music is composed by Gessle, except where noted.

Good Karma track listing
No.	Title	Music	Producer(s)	Length
1.	"Why Dontcha?"		Christoffer Lundquist; Clarence Öfwerman; Gessle	2:46
2.	"It Just Happens"		Lundquist; Öfwerman; Gessle	3:46
3.	"Good Karma"	Andreas Broberger; Gessle; Hannes Lindgren	Lundquist; Öfwerman; Gessle	3:19
4.	"This One"		Lundquist; Öfwerman; Gessle	3:12
5.	"You Make It Sound So Simple"	Broberger; Gessle; Lindgren	Lundquist; Öfwerman; Gessle; Addeboy vs. Cliff^{[a]}	3:42
6.	"From a Distance"		Addeboy vs. Cliff; Lundquist^{[b]}; Gessle^{[b]}	3:31
7.	"Some Other Summer"		Lundquist; Öfwerman; Gessle	3:09
8.	"Why Don't You Bring Me Flowers?"		Lundquist; Öfwerman; Gessle	3:32
9.	"You Can't Do This to Me Anymore"	Gessle; Mats Persson	Lundquist; Öfwerman; Gessle; Addeboy vs. Cliff^{[a]}	3:50
10.	"20 BPM"	Broberger; Gessle; Lindgren	Lundquist; Öfwerman; Gessle; Addeboy vs. Cliff^{[a]}	3:48
11.	"April Clouds"		Lundquist; Öfwerman; Gessle	3:30

Notes

- ^{^[a]} signifies backing track production
- ^{^[b]} signifies a co-producer

== Personnel ==
Credits adapted from the liner notes of Good Karma.

- Roxette are Marie Fredriksson and Per Gessle.
- Recorded at Tits & Ass Studio in Halmstad; The Aerosol Grey Machine in Vallarum, Scania; Studio Vinden in Djursholm and GB17 in Täby between May 2014 and February 2016.
- Mastered by Björn Engelmann at Cutting Room Studios in Stockholm.

Musicians and technical personnel

- Addeboy vs. Cliff – engineering (at GB17), programming and production (tracks 5, 6, 9 and 10 only)
- Emmelie Åslin – photography
- Marie Dimberg – management
- Viktor Flumé – photography
- Wickholm Formavd – design
- Marie Fredriksson – lead and background vocals
- Per Gessle – lead and background vocals and production
- Christoffer Lundquist – background vocals, engineering (at Aerosol Grey Machine and Studio Vinden), programming, production and mixing
- Helena Josefsson – background vocals
- Clarence Öfwerman – production
- Mats "M.P." Persson – engineering (at Tits & Ass Studio)

== Charts ==
Weekly chart performance for Good Karma
Chart (2016)	Peak position
Australian Albums (ARIA)	25
Austrian Albums (Ö3 Austria)	10
Belgian Albums (Ultratop Flanders)	18
Belgian Albums (Ultratop Wallonia)	50
Czech Albums (ČNS IFPI)	1
Danish Albums (Hitlisten)	52
Dutch Albums (Album Top 100)	36
Finnish Albums (Suomen virallinen lista)	20
German Albums (Offizielle Top 100)	11
Greek Albums (IFPI)	69
Hungarian Albums (MAHASZ)	6
Italian Albums (FIMI)	90
Norwegian Albums (VG-lista)	29
Polish Albums (ZPAV)	36
Scottish Albums (OCC)	44
Spanish Albums (Promusicae)	10
Swedish Albums (Sverigetopplistan)	2
Swiss Albums (Schweizer Hitparade)	2
UK Albums (OCC)	61
