= Record chart =

Ranking of recorded music for a given period

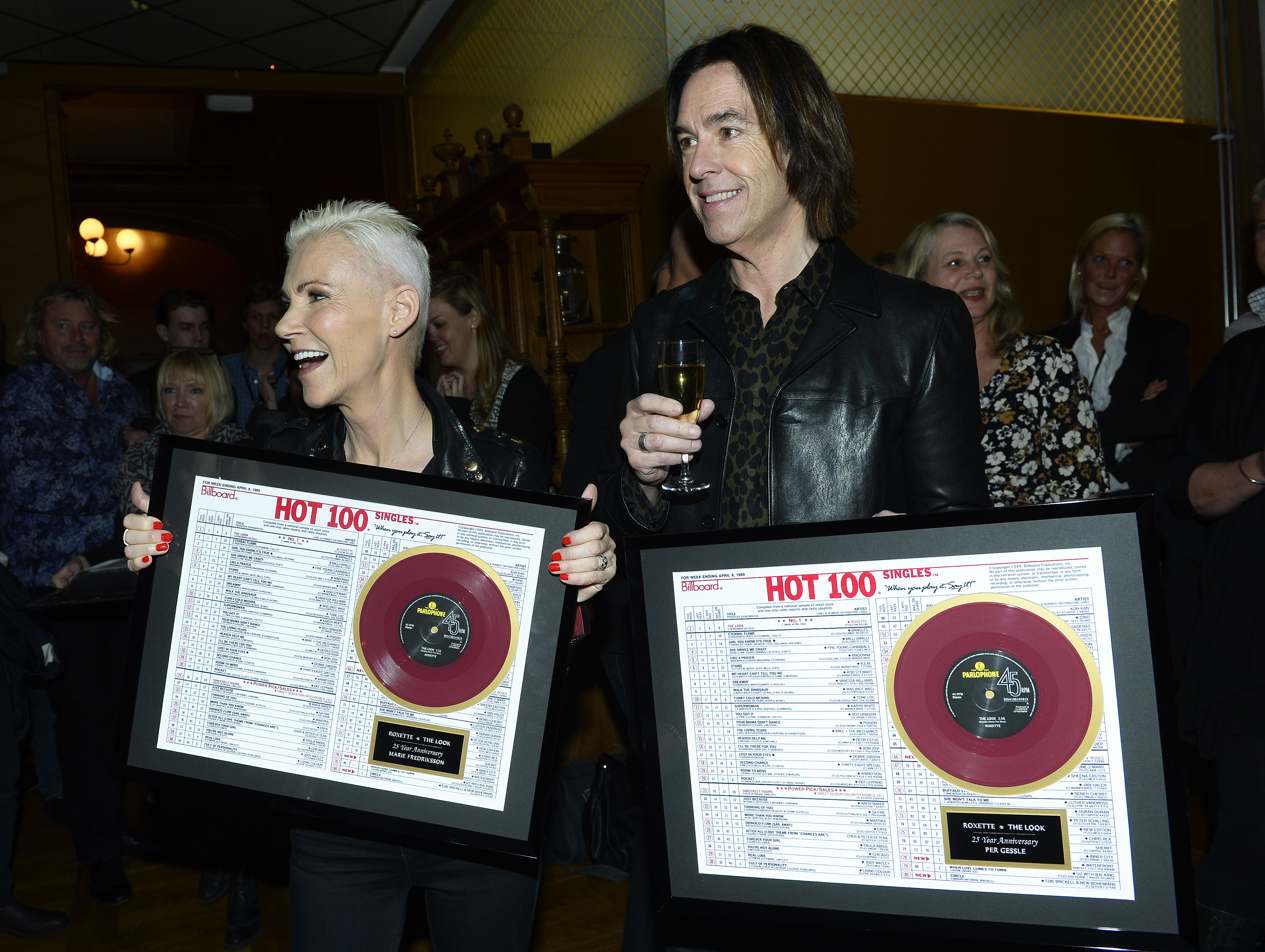
Swedish pop/rock duo Roxette celebrate the 25th anniversary of their single "The Look" reaching the top spot on the Billboard Hot 100

A record chart, in the music industry, also called a music chart, is a ranking of recorded music according to certain criteria during a given period. Many different criteria are used in worldwide charts, often in combination. These include record sales, the amount of radio airplay, the number of downloads, and the amount of streaming activity.

Some charts are specific to a particular musical genre and most to a particular geographical location. The most common period covered by a chart is one week with the chart being printed or broadcast at the end of this time. Summary charts for years and decades are then calculated from their component weekly charts. Component charts have become an increasingly important way to measure the commercial success of individual songs.

A common format of radio and television programs is to run down a music chart.

== History ==
The first record chart was founded in 1952 by Percy Dickins, who was working at New Musical Express at the time. Dickins would telephone roughly twenty UK record stores and ask what their best-selling records were that week. Several similar charts followed after the success of the NME chart, including Melody Maker and Record Retailer.

In the US, Billboard introduced the Hot 100 on August 4, 1958, as the first chart to fully integrate sales and airplay data. Before this, Billboard published separate rankings such as "Best Sellers in Stores," "Most Played by Jockeys" (later revived as Hot 100 Airplay), and "Most Played in Juke Boxes." From 1958 to 1991, the Hot 100 was based on radio playlists and retail surveys. On November 30, 1991, Billboard introduced a new method of determining the Hot 100: "by a combination of actual radio airplay monitored electronically by Nielsen Broadcast Data Systems (BDS), additional playlists from small-market stations, and actual point-of-sale information provided by Nielsen SoundScan." Until 1998, only physically released singles could chart. In recent decades, traditional band-oriented music has declined on the charts, particularly in the US, as solo artists and electronic-based productions gained dominance.

== Chart hit ==
A chart hit is a recording, identified by its inclusion in a chart that uses sales or other criteria to rank popular releases, that ranks highly in popularity compared to other songs in the same timeframe. Chart-topper and related terms (like number one, No. 1 hit, top of the charts, chart hit, and so forth) are widely used in common conversation and in marketing, and are loosely defined. Because of its value in promoting recording artists and releases, both directly to the consumer, and by encouraging exposure on radio, TV, and other media, chart positioning has long been a subject of scrutiny and controversy. Chart compilation methodology and data sources vary, ranging from "buzz charts" (based on opinions of various experts and tastemakers), to charts that reflect empirical data such as retail sales. Therefore, a chart-topper may be anything from an "insiders' pick" to a runaway seller. Most charts that are used to determine extant mainstream popularity rely on measurable data.

Record chart performance is inherently relative, as they rank songs, albums, and records in comparison to each other at the same time, as opposed to music recording sales certification methods, which are measured in absolute numbers. Comparing the chart positions of songs at different times thus does not provide an accurate comparison of a song's overall impact. The nature of most charts, particularly weekly charts, also favors songs that sell very well for a brief period; thus, a song that is only briefly popular may chart higher than a song that sells more copies in the long range, but more slowly. As a result, a band's biggest hit single may not be its best-selling single.

== Terminology ==
There are several commonly used terms when referring to a music/entertainment chart or the performance of a release thereon.

A new entry is a title which is making its début in that chart. It is applied to all charts, for instance a track which is outside the Top 40 but which later climbs into that level of the chart is considered to be a 'new entry' to the Top 40 that week. In most official charts, tracks have to have been on sale for a period of time in order to enter the chart; however, in some retailers' charts, new releases are included in charts as 'new entries' without a sales history in order to make them more visible to purchasers. In the UK, the official published chart is a Top 100, although a new entry can take place between positions 101–200 (also true of the Billboard Hot 100, which has a "Bubbling Under" addendum for new songs that have not yet made the Hot 100). A "Top 40" is used by radio to shorten playlists.

A re-entry is a track which has previously entered a chart, fallen off, and then later re-appears on the same chart. This it may come about if a release is reissued or if there is a re-surge of interest in the track. Generally, any repeat entry of a track into a chart is considered a re-entry, unless the later version of the track is a materially different recording or is significantly repackaged (such as Michael Jackson's "Thriller 25"), where the release would normally be considered separate and thus a "new" entry.

A climber is a release which is going higher in the chart week-on-week. Because chart positions are generally relative to each other on a week-to-week basis, a release does not necessarily have to increase sales week-to-week to be a climber, as if releases ahead of it decline in sales sufficiently, they may slip below it. By the same metric, not all week-to-week sales increases result in a climber, if other releases improve by a sufficient amount to keep it from climbing. The term highest climber is used to denote the release making the biggest leap upwards in the chart that week. There is generally not an equivalent phrase for tracks going down the chart; the term "faller" is occasionally used, but not as widely as 'climber'.

A one-hit wonder is an act that appears on the chart just once, or has one song that peaks exceptionally higher, or charts for exceptionally longer than other chart entries by the act. The term true one-hit wonder was used by the Guinness Book of British Hit Singles & Albums (and also the Billboard book Top Pop Singles) for an act that has one Top 40 hit and nothing else on the chart ever. If an act re-appears in some other form (for example, a solo performer who later appears with a band or with another act), then the multiple appearances are treated separately.

== See also ==
- List of record charts
- Hit parade
