= It Just Happens =

2016 single by Roxette

Single by Roxette

from the album Good Karma
- Released: 8 April 2016
- Studio: Aerosol Grey Machine, Scania
- Genre: Electropop
- Length: 3:46
- Label: Roxette Recordings; Parlophone
- Songwriter(s): Per Gessle
- Producer(s): Clarence Öfwerman; Christoffer Lundquist; Gessle

Roxette singles chronology
"The Look (2015 Remake)" (2015)	"It Just Happens" (2016)	"Some Other Summer" (2016)

Music video
- "It Just Happens" on YouTube

"It Just Happens" is a song by Swedish pop music duo Roxette, released on 8 April 2016 as the lead single from their tenth studio album, Good Karma. An electropop track, it was their first release under a new deal signed with Warner Music Group. The music video was directed by Tobias Leo Nordquist. Although the song was not as successful as the duo's previous lead singles on commercial charts, it performed well on numerous airplay charts; the track has been broadcast almost 15,000 times on radio in Russia.

== Composition and recording ==
Per Gessle wrote the song specifically for vocalist Marie Fredriksson. It was one of the first tracks recorded for parent album Good Karma, with Gessle saying he presented his original demo to Clarence Öfwerman, Christoffer Lundquist and Fredriksson, and "they all loved it. I never considered it to be a single but the others got a 'Wish I Could Fly'-feel out of it." The track was primarily produced by Lundquist; Gessle said that, while in the studio, Lundquist noted he had "never produced a 'classic' Roxette mid-tempo ballad before", so he "had to have a go". The recording would "set the tone for the whole [Good Karma] project." The backing track was recorded in Lundquist's studio Aerosol Grey Machine in Scania, while Fredriksson's vocals were recorded at her home in the Stockholm suburb of Djursholm.

Gessle described the chord progression in the verses as "very unlike me style-wise. Haven't got a clue how that happened. It just happened." According to Ultimate Guitar, the track is an electropop song with a vivace tempo of 156 beats per minute. The first verse consists of two sequences—the first of these is made up of Dm–A♯–C–F–E–Am; the second is identical, with the exception of the A♯ being replaced by a G. This is followed by a bridge made up of three repetitions of A♯–F, with the third repetition ending with a C, a chorus consisting of two repetitions of Dm–G–F–C and an A♯–C–F–C sequence, and a post-chorus section of two repetitions of Dm–A♯–F–C. The second verse is made up of Dm–A♯–C–Am–E–Am, followed by the aforementioned bridge. The second chorus amends upwards by almost two octaves, consisting of two repetitions of Dm–A♯–F–C and a concluding sequence of A♯–C–Dm–A♯–C. The post-chorus is then repeated, followed by a final verse of Dm–G–F–G–Dm–G–F–C–A♯–C–F–C. The final chorus and outro consists of repeated sequences of Dm–A♯–F–C.

== Release and promotion ==
The song was issued as a one-track digital download on 8 April, and was the first release issued by the band as part of a new deal signed with Warner Music Group. It was leaked a week before its official release via multiple Russian websites. The music video was directed by Tobias Leo Nordquist, and was published on YouTube on 18 May.

== Critical reception ==
Anders Nunstedt from Expressen said the song "embraces Roxette's most classic sound; the ballad sound", praising its production as "elegant and fantastic" while comparing it to several of the duo's previous singles, as well as Coldplay's "Paradise". Renowned for Sound said the song "packs the biggest punch on Good Karma", describing it as a "power-pop love-letter full of hope". They went on to compliment the vocals, saying that Gessle's "slightly computerized verse" acted as a counterpoint to Fredriksson's "powerful chorus", a dichotomy which they said was a "reminder of why Roxette have remained as successful as they have, and remained a mainstay in pop music for 30 years." The Music said the song was reminiscent of "Listen to Your Heart", calling it a "solid electro-ballad complete with 'modern' ambient production vibes and a mad drop."

== Commercial performance ==
The song was not as successful as the duo's previous lead singles, failing to appear on any commercial record charts. It did, however, peak in the top ten of Billboard's Swedish Digital Songs, and spent four weeks on the unranked Belgian Ultratip chart, which acts as an extension to that country's official singles chart. Despite reaching a relatively low position on the Russian Airplay Chart, "It Just Happens" has been broadcast almost 15,000 times on Russian radio.

== Charts ==
Chart (2016)	Peak position
Russian Airplay (Tophit)	184
Swedish Digital Songs (Sverigetopplistan)	8
