= Some Other Summer =

2016 single by Roxette

Single by Roxette

from the album Good Karma
- Released: 17 June 2016
- Genre: Dance-pop
- Length: 3:07
- Label: Roxette Recordings; Parlophone
- Songwriter(s): Per Gessle
- Producer(s): Clarence Öfwerman; Christoffer Lundquist; Gessle

Roxette singles chronology
| "It Just Happens" (2016) | "Some Other Summer" (2016) | "Why Don't You Bring Me Flowers?" (2016) |

Music video
- "Some Other Summer" (lyric video) on YouTube

"Some Other Summer" is a song by Swedish pop music duo Roxette, written by Per Gessle and released on 17 June 2016 as the second single from Roxette's tenth studio album, Good Karma. Prior to this, a remix by French DJ Sebastien Drums was issued as a non-album single on 6 November 2015, with Drums also creating a music video for his version of the song. An official music video was not made for Roxette's album version, although a fan-made video became a viral hit after Gessle publicised it via Roxette's official social media accounts. The latter clip proved controversial in parts of eastern Europe.

== Composition and recording ==
Per Gessle said composing the track required him to expand on his usual composition style, elaborating: "As a songwriter I'm totally influenced by the 1960s pop tradition where a song consists of different parts like verse, bridge and chorus—with different chords in the different parts. But with today's pop writing style it's more common to use the same chords throughout the song, and instead just change the melody as you go along." He added "I took it as a fun challenge to see if I could write a song with the same four chords repeated over and over, and still make it interesting and the result was 'Some Other Summer', which incidentally set the tone for the whole album since it was the first song we recorded for Good Karma." The song consists of a repeated pattern of Em–A–D–G up to its second chorus, which is followed by an instrumental bridge of Gm–C–F–A♯ before returning to the Em–A–D–G pattern for the final choruses.

== Critical reception ==
Brendon Veevers from Renowned for Sound described the track as being "soaked in a cool summer vibe". He called it a "perfect follow up" to preceding single "It Just Happens", and said it could be a "popular radio hit for the approaching European sunny season." Scandipop opined: "There are two types of amazing Roxette song. The Epic Ballad, and the Camp As Tits Eurodance Number. And with every new album we normally get at least one of each released as a single. Previous single 'It Just Happens' was the very epitome of the former, and [with 'Some Other Summer'] the Swedish duo are camping it up right on schedule".

== Release and promotion ==
French DJ Sebastien Drums released a remix of the song on 6 November 2015. He also created a music video for the remix. An official music video for the Roxette version was not created; instead, a lyric video was uploaded to the duo's YouTube channel on 24 June 2016. Two months later, a Polish couple uploaded a lip-sync video for the song to their personal YouTube account. It was publicised by numerous media organisations and became a viral hit after Gessle shared it via Roxette's official social media accounts. The video was controversial in parts of eastern Europe, as it consisted of real-life footage of a homosexual couple. The couple went on receive numerous death threats.

== Track listing ==
- 2015 Sebastien Drums single (digital download)
1. "Some Other Summer" (Sebastien Drums Remix) – 3:12
2. "Some Other Summer" (Bottai Remix) – 5:27
- 2016 Roxette single (digital download)
1. "Some Other Summer" – 3:07
2. "Some Other Summer" (Alexander Brown Remix) - 5:07
3. "Some Other Summer" (Patrick Jordan Remix) – 3:01
4. "Some Other Summer" (Didrick Remix) – 2:55
5. "Some Other Summer" (TRXD) – 3:23
