= Join the Flumeride =

- Directed by: Tobias Persson
- Written by: Roger Gunnarsson; Tobias Persson
- Produced by: Ola Ingvarsson
- Starring: Anna Ahnstedt; Anders Celin
- Music by: Roger Gunnarsson; Tobias Persson
- Release date: 1998
- Running time: 56 minutes
- Country: Sweden
- Language: Swedish

Join the Flumeride is a 1998 Swedish mockumentary. The plot revolves around two fictional bands, "Gula Tidningen" and "Pincette", which are parodies of Swedish pop groups Gyllene Tider and Roxette respectively. The film features a cameo by Per Gessle, the lead vocalist of Gyllene Tider and one half of the duo Roxette. The title is a takeoff on the lyrics of Roxette's hit 1991 single, Joyride.
