= Roxette =

Swedish pop rock duo

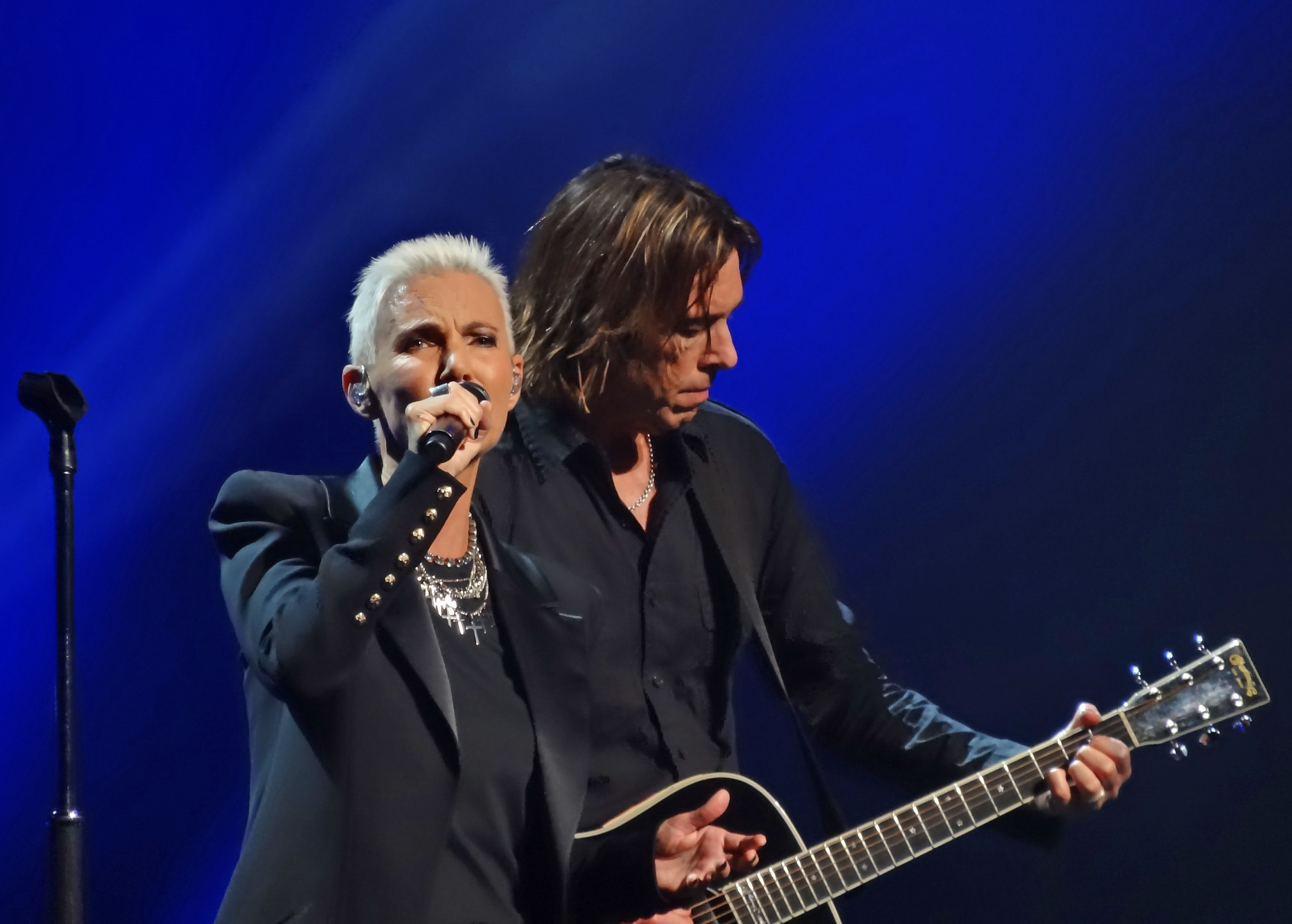
- Marie Fredriksson and Per Gessle performing as Roxette in 2012

Background information
- Origin: Halmstad, Sweden
- Genres: Pop rock; power pop; alternative rock; synth rock; pop; alternative pop; dance-pop; dance-rock
- Works: Roxette discography
- Years active: 1986–2019, 2024–present
- Labels: EMI; Edel Music; Capitol; RCA; Warner Music; Parlophone
- Spinoffs: PG Roxette
- Members: Per Gessle; Lena Philipsson
- Past members: Marie Fredriksson
- Website: roxette.se

Roxette is a Swedish pop rock duo originally consisting of Marie Fredriksson and Per Gessle. Following Fredriksson's death in 2019, Roxette continued as a live act from 2024 onwards, with Lena Philipsson appearing as live vocalist. Fredriksson and Gessle were both established musicians in Sweden prior to the band's formation. Fredriksson released several successful solo albums, while Gessle was the lead singer and songwriter of Gyllene Tider, a band that had three number one albums in Sweden. On the advice of their mutual record label EMI, Fredriksson and Gessle collaborated for their debut single, "Neverending Love" (1986), a hit in Sweden.

The band achieved international success with their second album, Look Sharp! (1988). The album spawned two US Billboard Hot 100 number-one singles: "The Look" and "Listen to Your Heart". "It Must Have Been Love", from soundtrack to the film Pretty Woman (1990), also reached number one in the US. Their follow-up album, Joyride (1991), remains their bestseller, selling 11 million copies worldwide, and yielded the US number-one single "Joyride". The band performed for over 1.5 million people during the Join the Joyride! Tour. Subsequent albums included Tourism (1992), Crash! Boom! Bang! (1994), and the greatest hits compilation Don't Bore Us, Get to the Chorus! (1995), which each sold over 5 million copies worldwide.

Have a Nice Day (1999) and Room Service (2001) earned gold and platinum certifications in Europe and Latin America. Fredriksson was diagnosed with a brain tumour in 2002, leading to an extended hiatus. The two then released several solo albums, with Gessle also reuniting with Gyllene Tider. Roxette reformed in 2009 for an extensive world tour, which ran until 2016. During this period, they released the albums Charm School (2011), Travelling (2012), and Good Karma (2016). Fredriksson announced her retirement from touring in 2016 due to poor health and died on 9 December 2019 due to complications from cancer.

Roxette is Sweden's second-best-selling musical act, after ABBA. They have sold between 75 and 80 million records worldwide, and are recognised as one of the highest-certified acts of all time in Germany, achieving sales of almost six million units. They had nineteen top-40 hits in the United Kingdom, where the British Phonographic Industry awarded them certifications of over three million units. In the US, they achieved four number ones on the Billboard Hot 100, and have been certified for over three million units by the Recording Industry Association of America. In 2021, Gessle released music under the name PG Roxette; their debut album Pop-Up Dynamo! was issued in 2022. In 2024, he announced a Roxette tour, with Lena Philipsson hired as vocalist.

== History ==
=== 1978–1987: Formation and Pearls of Passion ===
Per Gessle and Marie Fredriksson had been friends since 1978. Both musicians had successful careers in Sweden in the early 1980s. Gessle was a member of Gyllene Tider, (English: Golden Ages), whose first two albums each sold at least 150,000 copies in Sweden. In 1981, Fredriksson performed backing vocals on Gyllene Tider's song "Ingenting av vad du behöver" (English: "Nothing of What You Need"). The following year, Gessle invited Fredriksson to audition for Gyllene Tider's producer Lars-Göran "Lasse" Lindbom. Lindbom was impressed by Fredriksson's voice, and offered her a recording contract as a solo artist with the Swedish branch of EMI. However, she refused the deal, saying she "lacked the confidence" and was "too nervous" to be a solo artist. She then joined Lindbom's band as a backing vocalist for an extensive tour of Sweden.

In 1984, Fredriksson recorded backing vocals for Gyllene Tider's debut English album The Heartland Café, released in Sweden under the band's original name and in EP format in North America under the name Roxette—derived from the Dr. Feelgood song of the same name. Soon after, Fredriksson began releasing folk-based solo albums, beginning with Het vind (English: "Hot Wind") in 1984. Gessle also turned to solo work, releasing his second Swedish-language solo album, Scener (English: "Scenes"), in 1985, again featuring Fredriksson on background vocals. Fredriksson issued her second solo album, Den sjunde vågen (English: "The Seventh Wave"), in February 1986.

"I remember that Per had written a damn good song. I thought Per and Marie would fit together because Per writes very good music and Marie can sing the phone book and it sounds good. Of course, I'm a little proud that I was the one who came up with the idea for Roxette."

— EMI Sweden CEO Rolf Nygren in 2001

Around this time, the CEO of EMI, Rolf Nygren, suggested Fredriksson and Gessle collaborate together to record a song in English. Fredriksson was warned by friends and industry advisers to not participate with the project, fearing it may impact her burgeoning solo career. Gessle translated a song he wrote called "Svarta glas" (English: "Black Glasses") into English, which became their first single, "Neverending Love". It was released in the summer of 1986 under the name Roxette, and the single sold over 50,000 copies in Sweden. Roxette quickly recorded their debut album, Pearls of Passion, which was issued later in 1986. The album eventually sold over 280,000 copies in Sweden. "Neverending Love" and subsequent song "Soul Deep" were issued as singles internationally, but failed to chart outside Sweden.

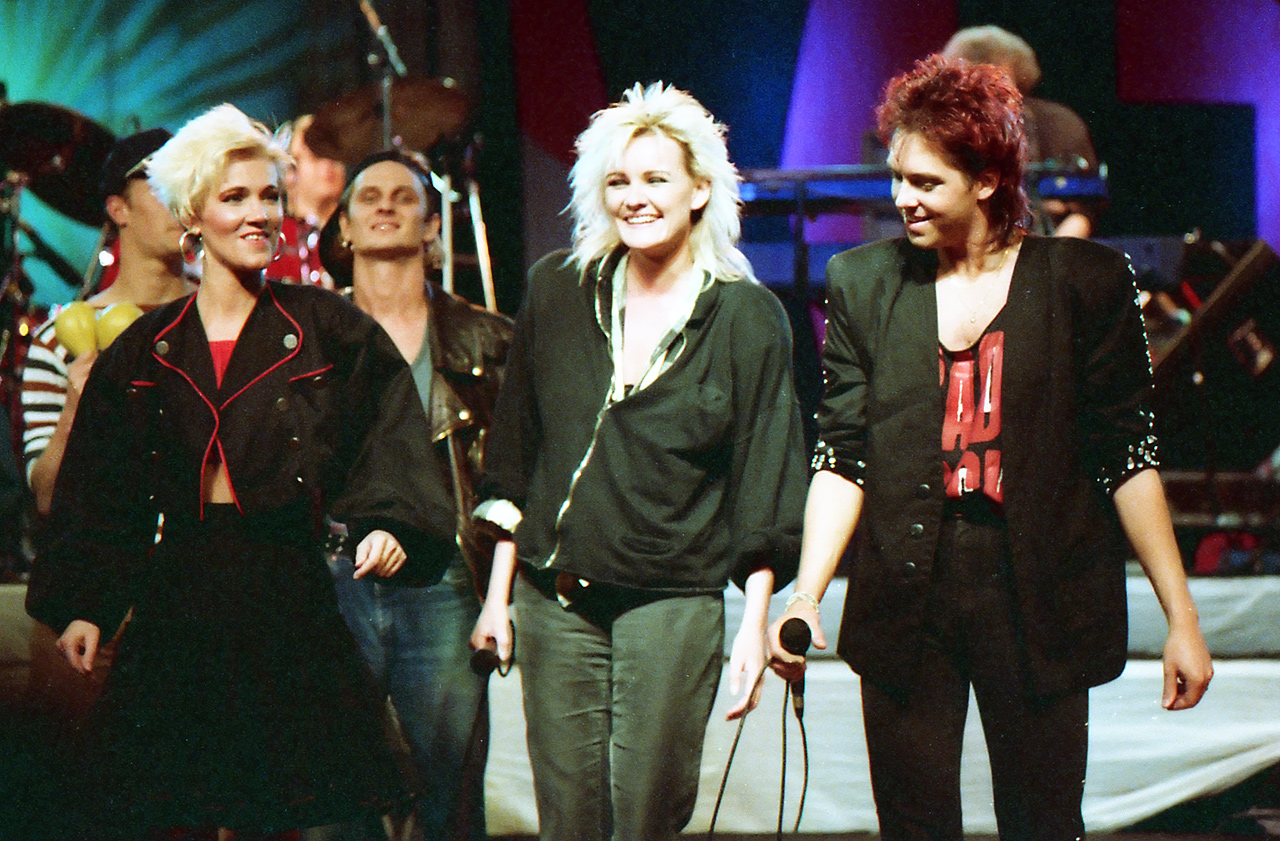
Fredriksson (left), Dahlgren (centre) and Gessle (right) on the "Rock runt riket" tour

In 1987, Roxette issued Dance Passion, a remix album of songs from their debut, and embarked on "Rock runt riket" (English: "Rock Around the Kingdom"), a co-headlining tour of Sweden with Eva Dahlgren and Ratata. All three acts collaborated to record "I Want You", which was released as a non-album single in July. Fredriksson released her third solo album Efter stormen (English: "After the Storm") in October 1987. It was her most successful solo album to date, peaking at number one on the Swedish Albums Chart and being certified platinum by Swedish Recording Industry Association. It won Best Swedish Album at the 1987 Rockbjörnen awards, where Fredriksson also won the award for Best Swedish Female.

Later that year, Roxette released "It Must Have Been Love (Christmas For the Broken Hearted)". The song was written by Gessle in response to the German division of EMI asking Gessle to "come up with an intelligent Christmas single." The track was a top five hit in Sweden. However, international divisions of EMI – including Germany – chose not to release the song as a single.

=== 1988–1991: International breakthrough ===
In the duo's native Sweden, "Dressed for Success" and "Listen to Your Heart" were chosen as the first two singles from their second album Look Sharp!, as Gessle and EMI Sweden chose to highlight Fredriksson's singing. Gessle said, "I always thought we should promote the songs Marie sang. Me being a lead singer wasn't part of the plan, not for me anyway." Both singles reached the top 10 of the Swedish singles chart, while the album, which was released in Sweden in October 1988, held the No. 1 position for 14 weeks. Music critic Måns Ivarsson was underwhelmed by the album, writing derisively: "To consist of two such original persons as Marie Fredriksson and Per Gessle, the album sounds unbelievably conventional. Most striking are the lyrics. Gessle's once so subtle Swedish lyrics have became desolate English nonsense." However, the album won Roxette their first Rockbjörnen awards in Sweden and Gessle his first Grammis award in the category Best Composer.

"The Look"
"The Look" topped the Billboard Hot 100 in the US on 8 April 1989 and would go on to top the charts in 25 other countries.

When the third single from Look Sharp!, "The Look", became another top 10 single in their home country, Roxette were still unknown internationally. While studying in Sweden an American exchange student from Minneapolis, Dean Cushman, heard "The Look" and brought a copy of Look Sharp! home for the 1988 holiday break. He gave the album to a Minneapolis radio station, KDWB 101.3 FM. The station started playing "The Look"; based on positive caller feedback, the song became very popular, and quickly spread to other radio stations. The song became a radio hit before any Roxette product had been commercially released or promoted in the US market. The story was covered by radio, newspapers and TV in the US and in Sweden. Fredriksson dismissed rumors that Cushman was paid to take the record to the radio station.

EMI had previously rejected Roxette as unsuitable for the American market and they did not have a recording contract there, but after the popularity of "The Look" in the US, EMI officials made the decision to release and market the single worldwide. "The Look" and pressed copies of Look Sharp! were issued in early 1989 to record stores and radio stations. "The Look" became their first No. 1 in the US on 8 April 1989, where it remained for one week. The breakthrough for Roxette became international when the song also topped the charts in 25 other countries, and at the end of the year, Billboard named "The Look" one of the 20 biggest Hot 100 singles of the year.

"The Big Bad Ballad. This is us trying to recreate that overblown American FM-rock sound to the point where it almost becomes absurd. We really wanted to see how far we could take it. When it hit big in the States we suddenly found ourselves lumped together with bands like Heart and Starship, which wasn't the intention behind Roxette at all. But we got out of that one... I hope."

— Gessle, talking about "Listen to Your Heart".

"Dressed for Success", featuring Fredriksson on lead vocals with Gessle singing short parts, was the second international single. The single peaked at No. 14 on the Hot 100 as well as at No. 3 in Australia. "Listen to Your Heart" was released thereafter; it differed from previous singles and instead resembled the guitar-heavy ballads of Heart. Spending a single week at No. 1 in the US in November 1989, it bore the distinction of being the first US Billboard Hot 100 No. 1 not to be commercially available on 7-inch vinyl.

A fourth single, "Dangerous", was released at the end of the year, entering the Hot 100 at the end of December. The single, a duet between Gessle and Fredriksson, spent two weeks at No. 2 on the Hot 100 in February 1990, and again becoming a worldwide success by reaching the top 10 in important music markets such as Germany and Australia. "Dangerous" was released as a double A-side single in the UK with "Listen to Your Heart".

==== "It Must Have Been Love" – Pretty Woman soundtrack ====
It was around this time that Touchstone Pictures approached EMI and Roxette about contributing a song to the soundtrack of an upcoming film, Pretty Woman, starring Richard Gere and Julia Roberts. Gessle maintained that "It Must Have Been Love", by then a two-year-old recording, was chosen because Roxette had no time to compose and record a new song. The film's producers turned it down, asking for another song, but Gessle declined to produce another song. Some weeks later after re-editing the film before release, the producers re-requested "It Must Have Been Love", but Roxette had to remove the Christmas lyrics. Gessle and producer Clarence Öfwerman then took the old recording, had Fredriksson replace a single Christmas-reference line in the song and added some instrumentation and background vocal overlays.

Though it was not the first single released from the soundtrack, "It Must Have Been Love" would prove to be Roxette's most successful single release. The song spent two weeks at No. 1 on the Hot 100 in June 1990, three months after the film's release, and stayed for two additional weeks at No. 2, spending a total of seventeen weeks in the top 40. Billboard named the song the No. 2 Hot 100 single of the year, behind Wilson Phillips's "Hold On". The single also topped the charts in more than 20 other countries (including Australia) around the world. In Germany the single spent 9 months in the top 75, and peaked at No. 3 in the UK, the duo's highest singles chart position there. The soundtrack went on to be certified three times platinum by the RIAA.

=== 1991–1992: Joyride ===
As 1990 wound down, Roxette completed their tour and returned to Sweden to record their follow-up to Look Sharp! The 15-track collection titled Joyride, which was released in March 1991, became a critical and commercial success. It topped the charts in a number of countries and became Roxette's best-selling album. Their record company EMI invested almost 2 million dollars on promotion for the album, which stayed at No. 1 in Germany for 13 weeks, while staying on the US album chart for over a year. J.D. Considine of Rolling Stone magazine reviewed Joyride: "By emphasizing its sense of personality, Roxette delivers more than just well-constructed hooks; this music has heart, something that makes even the catchiest melody more appealing." The album's success brought the duo two Rockbjörnen awards for Best Swedish Album and Best Swedish Group, the second time they had achieved that feat.

The single "Joyride" became Roxette's first No. 1 in their home country. It also topped the charts in more than 25 countries around the world, including Germany, Australia and the US; it was their fourth and last No. 1 in the US. The single also charted well in the UK, and achieved success in Canada, which resulted in the song being nominated in 1992 for a Juno Award in the category, Best Selling Single by a Foreign Artist. Its follow-up, "Fading Like a Flower (Every Time You Leave)", a power ballad similar to "Listen to Your Heart", with Fredriksson on lead, spent a week at No. 2 in the US in July and achieved success in other big markets as well.

Roxette then embarked on an ambitious worldwide tour. The Join the Joyride! World Tour 1991/92 tour eventually reached more than 1.5 million fans in 107 concerts around the world, including a few dates in the US. On reviewing their Universal Amphitheater performance, Dennis Hunt of the Los Angeles Times said, "Fredriksson is squandering her talents in pop's low-rent district. She's clearly superior to Roxette's uncomplicated, hook-crammed material..."

"I believed this ("Spending My Time") was going to be our biggest hit ever, which might have happened if not our American record company had fired a lot of...ah, never mind."

"When Charles Koppelman took over the American [record] company in 1992 more than hundred people got replaced. Those folks who got sacked were the same people who made Roxette happen in 89-90-91."

— Gessle, on the downturn of Roxette in the US

The end of 1991 saw the merger of SBK, Chrysalis and EMI record companies, to form EMI Records Group North America. The resulting merger saw many personnel changes that resulted in a downturn in publicity for Roxette. Though Joyride was certified platinum and made impressive worldwide sales, the subsequent singles from the album—the ballad "Spending My Time" and "Church of Your Heart"—failed to reach the heights of previous singles in the US charts.

In late 1991, the band was honoured with its own postage stamp in Sweden, along with Lena Philipsson and Jerry Williams.

Music tastes in the U.S. were changing, with the emergence of new genres such as new jack swing, grunge, harder-core rap and hip-hop. As William Ruhlmann of AllMusic later wrote, "Americans probably lost interest [in Roxette] at about the time that Nirvana came roaring in from the Northwest." In a 2009 interview with BBC News, Gessle highlighted the popularity of Nirvana and grunge music as a contributor to Roxette's downturn in success. Although Roxette's commercial momentum in America was slowing down dramatically, elsewhere, singles from the Joyride album continued to become hits when "Spending My Time" and "The Big L." charted in many countries.

=== 1992–1993: Tourism ===
Roxette continued the Join the Joyride tour into 1992. It was during this tour that most of the material for Tourism: Songs from Studios, Stages, Hotelrooms & Other Strange Places was recorded. Instead of releasing an album of brand-new material, Gessle and Fredriksson re-mastered older recordings, including several slated for, but not included on, Look Sharp! and Joyride. They also recorded some of their live performances, recorded a country music-inspired version of "It Must Have Been Love" in a Los Angeles studio, and recorded new material in various locations around the world – an empty dance club, a hotel room – and compiled everything on to the album. Released in October 1992, Gessle and Fredriksson said Tourism was meant to "capture the energy within the band".

The first single off the album was "How Do You Do!" followed by the ballad "Queen of Rain" and an electrified version of the song "Fingertips", originally recorded acoustically for the album and re-titled "Fingertips '93" for single release. Singles from Tourism barely dented the American radio and record charts but in the rest of the world, the first single "How Do You Do!", hit the top 5 in most European and South American countries. The album Tourism also charted well outside of the US, reaching No. 1 in Germany and Sweden, No. 2 in the UK as well as peaking at No. 3 in Australia. The album sold 6 million copies worldwide. The duo's success reflected in an ECHO Award nomination for International Group of the Year. At home, Roxette won a Rockbjörnen Award for Best Swedish Group. It remains the last Rockbjörnen the duo received. In October 1992, Fredriksson released her first solo album in Swedish for five years, titled Den ständiga resan (The Eternal Journey).

"Almost Unreal"
Mike Schiller from Popmatters called the song "awful"; and wrote, "...not only does it sound like corporate pandering, but it's probably the most forced smash hit wannabe Roxette ever created."

In early 1993, Roxette became the first non-native-English speaking artists to be featured on MTV's Unplugged series, though the songs from the performance were never released on an official Unplugged album. In the same year, Roxette recorded and released "Almost Unreal", a song originally slated for the film Hocus Pocus starring Bette Midler. However, the song was moved to the soundtrack of the film based on the Nintendo video game Super Mario Bros. Supported by an expensive video and ultimately receiving respectable airplay, "Almost Unreal" managed to briefly reach the lower end of the Billboard Hot 100 but charted highest in the UK reaching the top 10, the group's first time there since "Joyride" two years before. Roxette themselves were dismissive about the song, with Fredriksson saying it was "not one of our most inspired moments." On the other hand, Gessle stated: "I still like the song in a way... but if you wanted to make a parody of Roxette, it would probably sound something like this." To coincide with the UK television premiere of the film Pretty Woman, "It Must Have Been Love" was re-issued in September 1993 and entered the UK and Irish singles charts for the second time.

=== 1994–1997: Crash! Boom! Bang! and Don't Bore Us, Get to the Chorus! ===
"MF: It was just before Christmas '93 and we were listening to the first playback of the Crash! Boom! Bang! album and realized we were all missing something. It all sounded so... perfectly grown up. PG: We had worked for a year, much too long, endless hours of studio time... I mean, I loved it but there was too little P-O-P."

— Roxette, on the first playback of Crash! Boom! Bang!

Roxette changed their musical style with the 1994 release of Crash! Boom! Bang! Bryan Buss of Allmusic wrote, "They rock harder than on their pop-friendly albums prior to this, and the result shows growth but not the fun that made them so popular in the first place... Though the two have an edge on this album, they almost seem to have become a bit bored."

Although Crash! Boom! Bang! saw chart success (No. 1 in Sweden, No. 2 in Germany and No. 3 in Australia and the UK), it sold fewer copies than had their previous albums, selling 5 million copies worldwide. EMI America were reluctant to release the album, and instead promoted a shortened 10-track Favorites CD in association with McDonald's. The Favorites of Crash! Boom! Bang! CD reportedly sold about 1 million copies. It was noted by journalists that the McDonald's promotion CD (and other CDs by Tina Turner, Garth Brooks and Elton John) led to US music retailers of the time being unhappy with the promotion for several reasons, including that it bypassed established music stores and that the price of the CD was way below normal wholesale costs. Some stores refused to sell the albums published by EMI, with one major chain protesting by temporarily pulling all products from CEMA (EMI's distribution wing) out of its sales and ad campaigns. The duo's relations with EMI's North American subsidiary, which had never been smooth, collapsed after the release of this album. Crash! Boom! Bang! became the last Roxette release EMI issued in the US until Greatest Hits was released in 2011 on subsidiary label Capitol Records.

The first single release from Crash! Boom! Bang! was "Sleeping in My Car". The distortion guitar-heavy pop song, born out of anger and frustration of the album's grown up nature, reached No. 2 in Canada, as well as the top 10 in 7 European countries (including No. 1 in Sweden) as well as the top 15 in the UK, Australia and Germany. However, in the US, it was less successful, reaching only No. 50 on the Billboard Hot 100 chart. Subsequent releases--the album's title selection, "Fireworks", and "Run to You"—were less successful but managed to reach the charts in some countries.

Roxette then embarked on another, albeit scaled-down, worldwide tour, skipping North America in the process. The "Crash! Boom! Bang! Tour" saw Roxette becoming the first Western band to be allowed to perform in China (Workers' Indoor Arena, Beijing) since Wham! in 1985. The procedure to get permission for this concert took over a year, and included self-censorship of lyrics. In 2008 they were ordered to pay 4.5 million kronor in unpaid taxes to the Swedish Tax Agency, for money earned during the German part of the 1994/95 tour.

In October 1995, Roxette released their first greatest hits compilation, Don't Bore Us, Get to the Chorus! This reached the top 5 in many European countries, including the UK, as well as the top 10 in Australia. The compilation sold 6 million copies worldwide, and featured four new songs, three of which were released as singles, including the ballad "You Don't Understand Me", co-written by Desmond Child. Also that year, a compilation of demos, B-sides and remixes, alongside some of the 1993 MTV Unplugged material, was released in Japan and parts of South America under the title Rarities.

Gessle briefly reunited with Gyllene Tider in 1996, then Roxette took instrumental masters of many of its ballads and recorded translated Spanish lyrics over them. The resulting album, Baladas En Español, sold well in Spanish-speaking regions, reaching 2× platinum in Spain and platinum in Argentina. The single "Un día sin ti" ("Spending My Time") accompanied by a video directed by Jonas Åkerlund, became their first Latin Pop Airplay chart entry. The duo then released solo albums, I en tid som vår (In a Time Like Ours) by Fredriksson and The World According to Gessle by Gessle, with both charting in Sweden.

=== 1998–2001: Have a Nice Day and Room Service ===
Gessle and Fredriksson reunited in 1998 to record material for a new Roxette album, Have a Nice Day, which was released in February 1999 and gave Roxette a comeback in continental Europe. It entered at No. 1 in Sweden and No. 2 in Germany. The first single, "Wish I Could Fly", became their highest-charting UK single since 1993 (No. 11). In Sweden it charted at No. 4, their best position since "Sleeping in My Car". Although the second single, "Anyone", did not chart well in Europe, "Stars", the third single, charted well in Scandinavian and German-speaking countries. NME's review called Have a Nice Day "...another clever-clever bastard of an album which defies Doctor Rock." A review of "I Wish I Could Fly" written by Håkan Steen of Aftonbladet said, "The come-back single is a disappointment. The lyrics, which convey a sense of distance in a relationship, are not particularly engaging." The album, according to Billboard magazine, was under discussion for release in the US, but ultimately, it was not released there.

In 2000, Fredriksson released a greatest hits compilation called Äntligen (At Last), which went on to be a big seller in Sweden, peaking at No. 1 for three weeks. Meanwhile, Roxette signed a US distribution deal with Edel Music, which re-released Don't Bore Us, Get to the Chorus! In doing so, it replaced some non-US hits with songs from Have a Nice Day. To promote the release the duo did a small tour of The United States, performing at the Boston Mixfest and at the Virgin Megastore in Times Square. The single "Wish I Could Fly", included on the album, reached No. 27 on the Billboard Adult Contemporary chart and No. 40 on the Adult Top 40 chart.

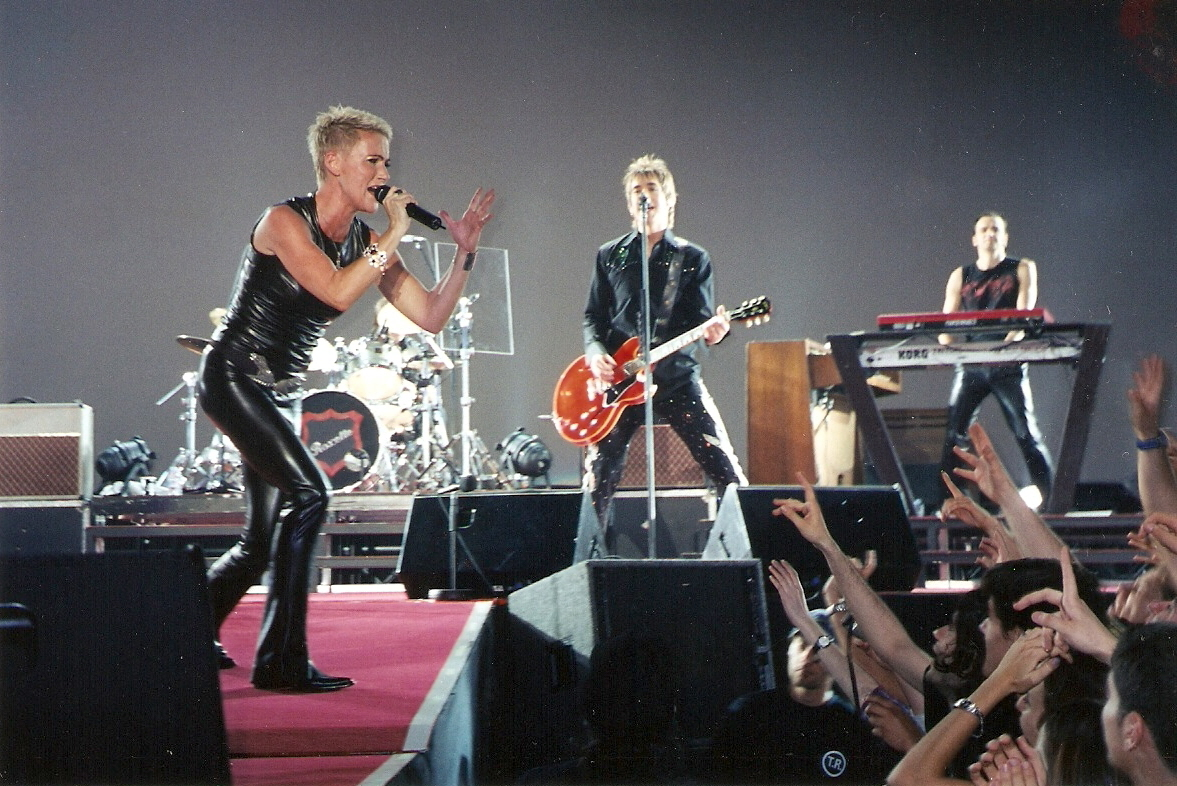
Roxette in a 2001 concert in Spain

Room Service followed in 2001, to a mixed response from critics. "Probably the best Roxette album since Joyride," wrote Leslie Mathew of Allmusic, "Room Service is an exciting, immediate, high-gloss pop gem that contains very little filler indeed." Per Bjurman from Swedish tabloid Aftonbladet was critical of the album. "It is not very good." he wrote. He did praise the three singles, "Real Sugar", "The Centre of the Heart", and "Milk and Toast and Honey", but he ended the review with the prediction: "Roxette is not finished. But soon, I suspect."

The album topped the Swedish charts and reached No. 3 in Germany, but it received little attention in the UK. A planned US release through Edel America Records did not happen as the label was disbanded due to financial difficulties, though it did peak at No. 2 on CNN's Worldbeat album chart. The first single, "The Centre of the Heart" topped the charts in Sweden, made the top 10 in Spain, and the top 15 in Finland. The other singles, "Real Sugar", the album's opening track and "Milk and Toast and Honey" were less successful. Roxette again went on tour, this time in Europe only, as concerts planned in South Africa were cancelled after the 11 September 2001 attacks. On reviewing their Löfbergs Lila Arena concert, Bjurman from Aftonbladet wrote, "Roxette succeed in all cases, to never leave the 80s." His review criticised Roxette's playlist, which consisted of some of their early hits. Johan Lindqvist from Göteborgs-Posten was more positive, scoring their Munich concert four stars out of five.

=== 2002–2008: Fredriksson's illness, compilation albums and solo work ===
Roxette received an honorary award from the Swedish government at the February 2002 Grammis ceremony. On 11 September 2002, Fredriksson had an epileptic seizure and fractured her skull after collapsing in her bathroom. Following MRI scans, it was confirmed that Fredriksson had a brain tumour. The diagnosis led to the cancellation of Roxette's planned performance at the 2002 Night of the Proms concert series. After waiting several weeks for the fracture to subside, she underwent surgery to remove the malignant tumour, followed by months of chemotherapy and radiation treatment. Fredriksson was unable to speak for a considerable period of time afterward, and for the rest of her life was unable to read, was blind in one eye, and had limited hearing and mobility.

Roxette issued two greatest hits compilations, The Ballad Hits in late 2002 and The Pop Hits in early 2003. On December 1, 2002, a 600-page discography book titled The Look for Roxette was released, which included a four-song EP of previously unreleased material. The release of The Ballad Hits was delayed until Valentine's Day 2003 in English-speaking territories such as Australia, the United Kingdom, and the United States. In January 2003, Roxette received the Litteris et Artibus ("Culture and Education") award from King of Sweden Carl Gustaf XVI, for "achievements in Sweden and internationally". The Ballad Hits sold over a million copies within a year, and was the best-selling album released by a Scandinavian act that year. The duo received a World Music Award for Best-Selling Scandinavian Artist in October 2003.

"They were a legitimately popular band, but they don't fit neatly into the story of American pop music. The Swedish duo wasn't a boy band like New Kids on the Block, they weren't glammy enough to be hair metal, and vocalist Marie Fredriksson didn't have the outsize personality to be a diva like Whitney Houston, Mariah Carey, or Janet Jackson. They were far from the only guitar-based pop act on the airwaves in the '80s, but they came too late to be mentioned alongside Journey, Survivor, or REO Speedwagon, and they didn't have the rock legacy of Heart or Starship."

— Chris Conaton from PopMatters reviewing Greatest Hits

In 2003, Gessle released Mazarin (Cake), which became his most successful solo album. The record sold over 335,000 copies in Sweden as of January 2005, and received numerous awards. Gyllene Tider reformed to celebrate their 25th anniversary in 2004, releasing the studio album Finn 5 fel! (Find 5 Errors!) in June, their first new material since 1996. That album was also successful, selling 230,000 copies in Sweden by January 2005.

Fredriksson released her first English-language solo album, The Change, in October 2004, which debuted atop the Swedish albums chart. Despite being unable to read or write, Fredriksson rediscovered her love of drawing during her illness, and began using charcoal to create artwork as a form of therapy. She drew the cover art for The Change, and held her first art exhibition – titled "After the Change" – at the vernissage of the Doktor Glas gallery in Kungsträdgården, Stockholm in October 2005. The following month, Gessle released his second English-language studio solo album, Son of a Plumber.

Also in 2005, several remixes of Roxette songs became hit singles. A remix of "Fading Like a Flower" by Dancing DJs was a top twenty hit in the UK, while Belgian dance group DHT's 2003 trance cover of "Listen to Your Heart" became a top ten hit on the Billboard Hot 100, and was certified gold by the RIAA.

Fredriksson released her seventh solo album in June 2006, an album of Swedish cover songs titled Min bäste vän (My Best Friend). To commemorate their 20th anniversary, Roxette issued the four-disc box set The Rox Box/Roxette 86–06 on 18 October 2006. The set also included a DVD containing all their music videos and a previously unreleased 1993 concert for MTV Unplugged. Roxette recorded two new songs for the box set, "One Wish" and "Reveal", which both featured on a new greatest hits album, A Collection of Roxette Hits: Their 20 Greatest Songs!, released on the same date as The Rox Box. Gessle released two more solo albums: En händig man (A Handy Man) in 2007 and Party Crasher in 2008.

=== 2009–2016: Reformation, touring and studio albums ===
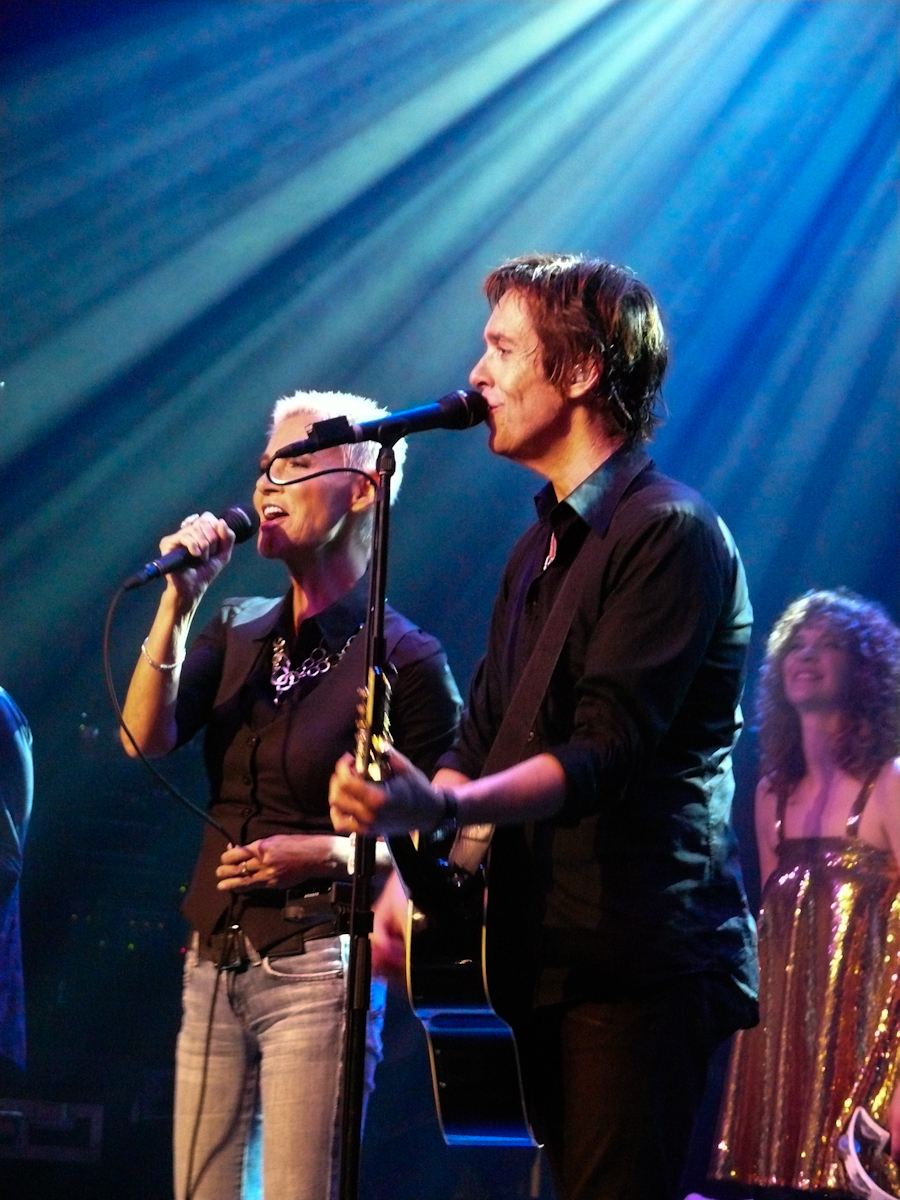
Fredriksson and Gessle in Amsterdam in May 2009

Rumours of a Roxette reunion began in April 2009 when Gessle was interviewed by the BBC, where he said he world "love to do more Roxette and I would love to do more recordings as well, because [Marie is] a great person and a great singer, but I don't want to push her at all. It's really up to her. If she calls me up and tells me 'I'm ready', I'd say 'Let's go for it'." Fredriksson joined Gessle on stage during the 6 May 2009 date of Gessle's "Party Crasher Tour" in Amsterdam. Immediately after the concert, Gessle announced to Swedish publication Aftonbladet that Roxette would perform at the 2009 edition of Night of the Proms. Roxette was scheduled to perform at the 2002 edition of the tour, but withdrew because of Fredriksson's illness. The tour began on 23 October 2009 and consisted of 42 dates in Belgium, Germany and the Netherlands. On the same date the tour began, Gessle confirmed to Swedish newspaper Expressen that Roxette had been recording material for a new album since May.

In 2010, the band performed a series of warm-up concerts in Europe, along with a June concert at the Stockholm Concert Hall for the Wedding of Victoria, Crown Princess of Sweden, and Daniel Westling. Roxette embarked on "The Neverending World Tour" at the beginning of 2011, an extensive worldwide tour. Their eighth studio album, Charm School, was released on 11 February 2011, preceded by lead single "She's Got Nothing On (But the Radio)" on 10 January. The song was Roxette's highest-peaking single in Germany since 1992's "How Do You Do!", while the album was their first since 1992's Tourism to peak at number one in Germany. The album was certified gold and peaked within the top twenty of numerous European territories. It sold half a million copies worldwide by the end of 2011.

During "The Neverending World Tour", Roxette recorded Travelling, an album of new studio recordings, live tracks and soundcheck performances. The album was issued in March 2012, and was preceded by "It's Possible" as the lead single. The song was A-listed on BBC Radio 2. By April 2012, Roxette had performed to over a million people during "The Neverending World Tour". In 2013, Gessle reunited with Gyllene Tider. The band embarked on a tour of large arenas and stadiums in Sweden, and released the album Dags att tänka på refrängen (Time to Think About the Chorus). That same year, Fredriksson issued the solo album Nu! (Now!), and also embarked on a solo tour of Sweden. Roxette issued their first live album in late 2013, Live: Travelling the World, which was also issued as part of a DVD and Blu-ray box set.

Roxette resumed touring in late 2014. They issued another greatest hits compilation, Roxette XXX – The 30 Biggest Hits, from late 2014, while an updated version of their 2006 box set The Rox Box/Roxette 86–06, titled The RoxBox!: A Collection of Roxette's Greatest Songs, was released in Australia in early 2015. They continued touring in 2015, and in July released "The Look (2015 Remake)", a new recording of their 1988 single. French DJ Sebastien Drums created a remix and music video for a new Roxette song titled "Some Other Summer", which was released in late 2015. Roxette Diaries, a documentary directed by Jonas Åkerlund, was released on video on demand services in March 2016. The following month, Fredriksson announcing her retirement from touring. She was advised by doctors to stop all touring activity, due to poor health. She issued a statement saying: "Sadly, now my touring days are over and I want to take this opportunity to thank our wonderful fans that [have] followed us on our long and winding journey." By the end of the tour, Roxette had performed to 2.5 million people (excluding music festival appearances) in over 50 countries.

Roxette's tenth and final studio album, Good Karma, was released in June 2016. The album is more electronic than the other albums the duo released following their reformation. It was produced by Gessle alongside regular producers Clarence Öfwerman and Christoffer Lundquist, and Swedish duo Addeboy vs. Cliff, with whom Roxette had collaborated on the 2015 remix of "The Look". Three singles were released from the album: "It Just Happens", "Some Other Summer", and "Why Don't You Bring Me Flowers?".

=== 2017–2023: Fredriksson and Alsing's deaths, vault releases and PG Roxette ===
Fredriksson and Gessle resumed solo work following the release of Good Karma. Gessle released two Swedish-language solo albums in 2017, En vacker natt (A Beautiful Night) and En vacker dag (A Beautiful Day). His tenth solo album, Small Town Talk, was released in 2018, and consisted of English versions of songs from En vacker natt and En vacker dag. All three records were recorded in Nashville. Fredriksson released the non-album singles "Alone Again" and "I Want to Go" in 2017, and "Sing Me a Song" in 2018. Roxette issued a 30th-anniversary edition of Look Sharp! in October 2018, containing a bonus disc of previously unreleased outtakes and demos. Gessle toured Europe in October and November 2018 as "Per Gessle's Roxette", with Helena Josefsson as vocalist and set lists for the tour consisting primarily of songs from Roxette's back catalogue.

Marie Fredriksson died on 9 December 2019, at the age of 61. Her cause of death was not initially specified, but it was later confirmed she died from complications stemming from her 2002 brain tumour diagnosis. Paying tribute to Fredriksson, Gessle said she was "the most wonderful friend for over 40 years", and "an outstanding musician, a master of the voice, an amazing performer." Gessle released his eleventh studio album, Gammal kärlek rostar aldrig (Old Love Never Rusts), in November 2020. A four-disc compilation of Roxette outtakes titled Bag of Trix was released the following month. An outtake from the Good Karma sessions, "Let Your Heart Dance with Me", was issued as the lead single from the compilation two months earlier. It was one of the final songs Fredriksson recorded before her death. On 19 December 2020, Roxette's longtime drummer Pelle Alsing died at the age of 60.

In 2021, Roxette released a 30th-anniversary edition of Joyride, containing two bonus discs of previously unreleased outtakes and demos. That same year, Gessle created a new project called PG Roxette. The band features Gessle alongside vocalists Helena Josefsson and Dea Norberg, who had both provided vocals on Gessle's previous work, either on his solo material or as backing vocalists on Roxette's live shows. The band's first release was a cover of the Metallica song "Nothing Else Matters", released on The Metallica Blacklist in September 2021. The following year, Roxette digitally issued a triple volume compilation of remixes titled ROX RMX (Remixes from the Roxette Vaults). PG Roxette released their debut album, Pop-Up Dynamo!, in October 2022, with a 4-track EP titled Incognito following in 2023.

=== 2024–present: Live reformation and musical ===
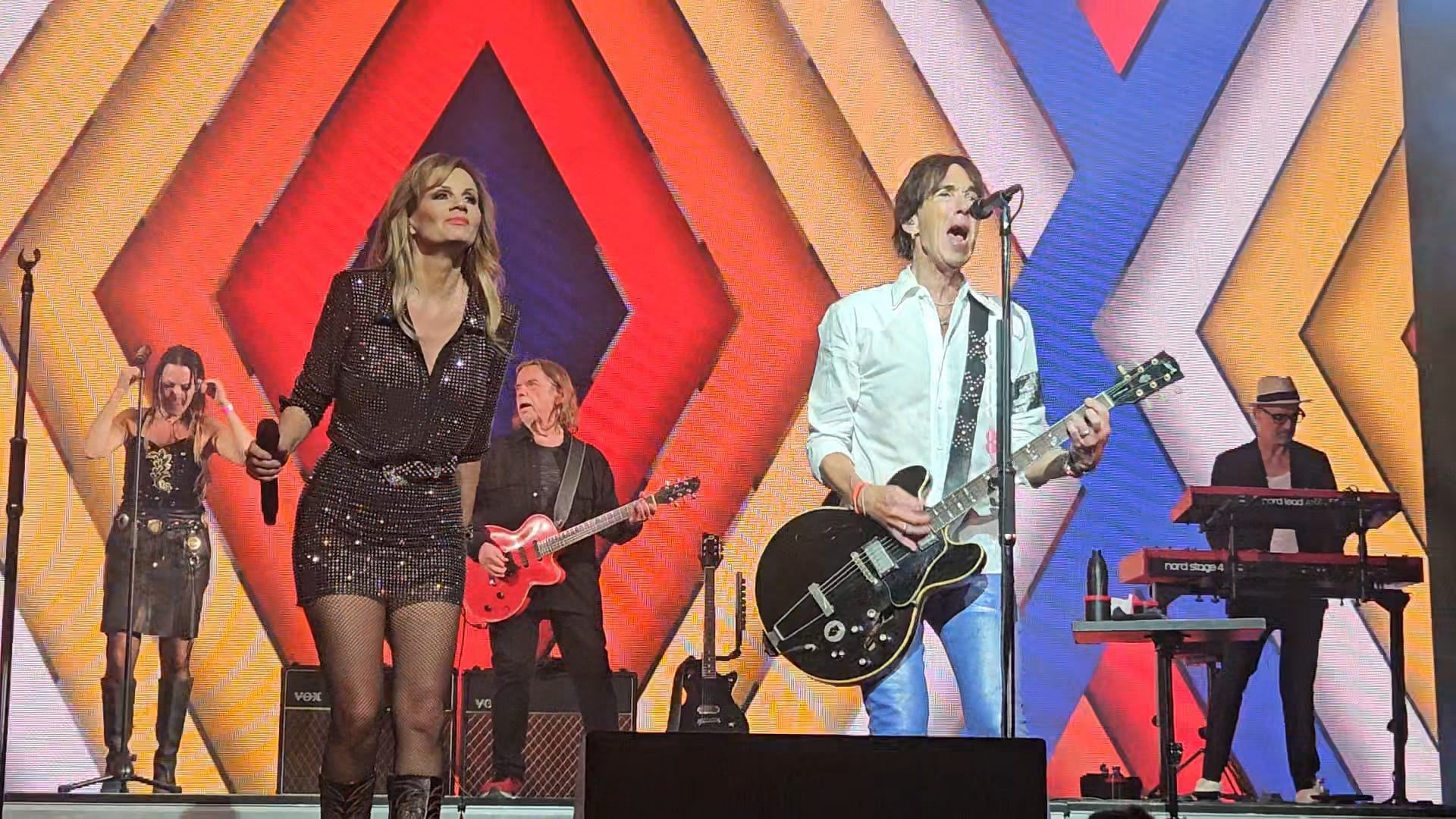
Roxette with Lena Philipsson performing at Rock Zottegem, Belgium in 2025

On 2 May 2024, Gessle announced the live reformation of Roxette. With Lena Philipsson taking over on lead vocals, the band toured Australia and South Africa from February 2025. A 3-CD box set of ROX RMX (Remixes from the Roxette Vaults) was released in September 2024. A musical titled Joyride the Musical, based on Roxette's music and Jane Fallon's book Got You Back, ran at Malmö Opera from September 2024 until April 2025.

== Impact and legacy ==
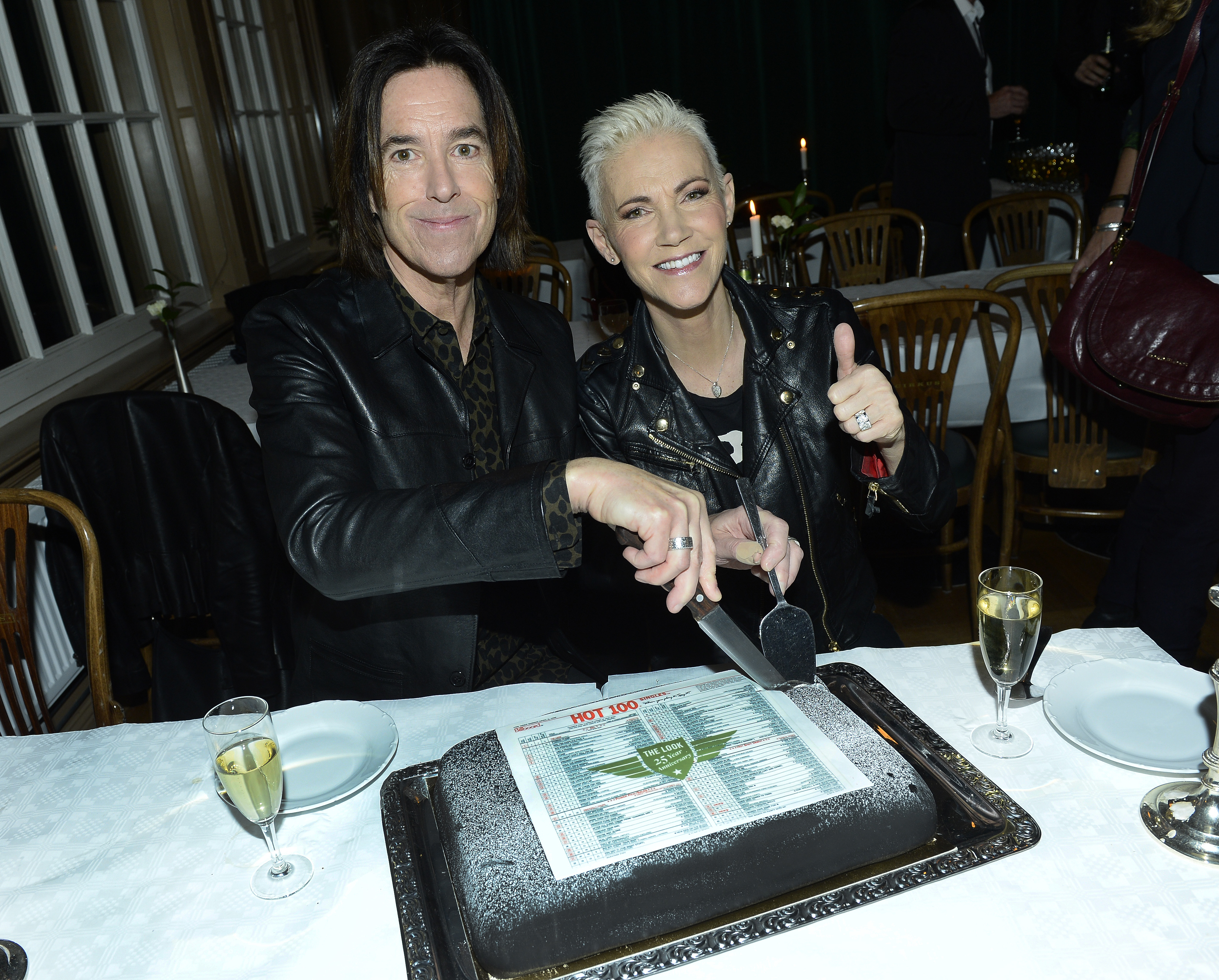
Per and Marie at a 2014 event celebrating the 25th anniversary of "The Look" topping the Billboard Hot 100

Roxette is Sweden's best-selling music act after ABBA. Roxette have sold between 75 and 80 million records worldwide. They sold over 5.7 million records in Germany, where they are recognised as one of the highest-certified acts of all time. In the United Kingdom, Roxette had nineteen top 40 hits, and the British Phonographic Industry have certified the band for shipments of over 3 million units.

In the United States, the RIAA awarded them certifications of 3.5 million units. They have sold over two million albums in the country since Nielsen SoundScan began tracking sales data in May 1991. Roxette achieved four number one singles on the Billboard Hot 100: "The Look", "Listen to Your Heart", "It Must Have Been Love" and "Joyride". Gessle is the sole-credited writer on three of these songs, making him one of the most successful solo songwriters on Billboard Hot 100 history. Roxette songs continue to receive extensive airplay. In 2014, both "Listen to Your Heart" and "It Must Have Been Love" received awards from music publisher Broadcast Music, Inc., after each song had been played on US radio five million times. "It Must Have Been Love" received an updated award in 2021, following its six millionth play.

== Awards and nominations ==
| Award | Year | Nominee(s) | Category | Result | Ref. |
|---|---|---|---|---|---|
| BMI London Awards | 2000 | "It Must Have Been Love" | 3 Million Award | Won | |
| BMI London Awards | 2005 | "It Must Have Been Love" | 4 Million Award | Won | |
| BMI London Awards | 2006 | "Listen to Your Heart" | Song of the Year | Won | |
| BMI London Awards | 2006 | "Listen to Your Heart" | Pop Award | Won | |
| BMI London Awards | 2006 | "Listen to Your Heart" | 3 Million Award | Won | |
| BMI London Awards | 2008 | "Listen to Your Heart" | 4 Million Award | Won | |
| Echo Music Prize | 1992 | Roxette | Best International Group | Nominated | |
| Echo Music Prize | 1993 | Roxette | Best International Group | Nominated | |
| Echo Music Prize | 1995 | Roxette | Best International Group | Nominated | |
| Echo Music Prize | 2012 | Roxette | Best International Group | Nominated | |
| Grammis | 1989 | Roxette | Artist of the Year | Nominated | |
| Grammis | 1989 | Roxette | Pop/Rock Group | Nominated | |
| Grammis | 1989 | Roxette | Show of the Year | Nominated | |
| Grammis | 1989 | Per Gessle | Composer of the Year | Won | |
| Grammis | 1992 | Roxette | Artist of the Year | Nominated | |
| Grammis | 1992 | Roxette | Pop/Rock Group | Won | |
| Grammis | 1992 | "The Big L." | Music Video of the Year | Nominated | |
| Grammis | 1992 | Per Gessle | Composer of the Year | Nominated | |
| Grammis | 1993 | Roxette | Pop Group | Nominated | |
| Grammis | 2002 | Roxette | Government Music Export Prize | Won | |
| Hungarian Music Awards | 1993 | Join the Joyride! Tour | Best Foreign Concert | Nominated | |

| Year | Nominee / work | Award | Result |
|---|---|---|---|
| 1988 | Look Sharp | Grammis (Sweden) – Composer of the Year (Gessle) | Won |
| 1988 | Look Sharp | Rockbjörnen (Sweden) – Best Swedish Album | Won |
| 1988 | Roxette | Rockbjörnen (Sweden) – Best Swedish Group | Won |
| 1989 | Roxette | Smash Hits Poll Winners Party – Most Promising New Group | Nominated |
| 1989 | "The Look" | MTV Video Award (USA) – International Viewer's Choice (Europe) | Won |
| 1989 | "The Look" | Music & Media Year-End Awards – Pan European Award | 2nd place |
| 1989 | Roxette | Rockbjörnen (Sweden) – Best Swedish Group | Won |
| 1989 | Roxette | Silver Bravo Otto (Germany) – Best rock/pop Group | Won |
| 1990 | Roxette | Bronze Bravo Otto – Best rock/pop group | Won |
| 1991 | Roxette | Brit Award (UK) – Best international group | Nominated |
| 1991 | Roxette | Silver Bravo Otto – Best rock/pop group | Won |
| 1991 | Roxette | Rockbjörnen (Sweden) – Best Swedish Group | Won |
| 1991 | Joyride | Rockbjörnen (Sweden) – Best Swedish Album | Won |
| 1991 | Joyride | Grammis – Pop Group of the Year | Won |
| 1991 | "Joyride" | MTV Video Award – International Viewer's Choice (Europe) | Won |
| 1991 | Roxette | Australian Music Awards – Most Popular International Group | Won |
| 1992 | Roxette | Gold Bravo Otto – Best rock/pop Group | Won |
| 1992 | Roxette | Rockbjörnen (Sweden) – Best Swedish Group | Won |
| 1992 | "Joyride" | Juno Award (Canada) – Best Selling Single by a Foreign Artist | Nominated |
| 1999 | "Wish I Could Fly" | Fono Music Award (Europe) – European No. 1 Airplay hit | Won |
| 2000 | Roxette | WMA – Best-Selling Scandinavian Artist | Won |
| 2002 | Roxette | Grammis (Sweden) – Government Music Export Prize | Won |
| 2003 | Roxette | WMA – Best-Selling Scandinavian Artist | Won |
| 2006 | "Listen to Your Heart" | BMI Pop Awards – Award-Winning Song | Won |
| 2007 | The Rox Box/Roxette 86–06 | Grammis (Sweden) – Best Compilation | Nominated |

== Band members ==
=== Current members ===
- Per Gessle – vocals, guitars, harmonica, percussion, banjo, keyboards (1986–2019, 2024–present)
- Lena Philipsson – vocals (2024–present)

=== Former members ===
- Marie Fredriksson – vocals, keyboards, piano (1986–2019; her death)

== Discography ==
- Pearls of Passion (1986)
- Look Sharp! (1988)
- Joyride (1991)
- Tourism (1992)
- Crash! Boom! Bang! (1994)
- Have a Nice Day (1999)
- Room Service (2001)
- Charm School (2011)
- Travelling (2012)
- Good Karma (2016)

== Tours ==
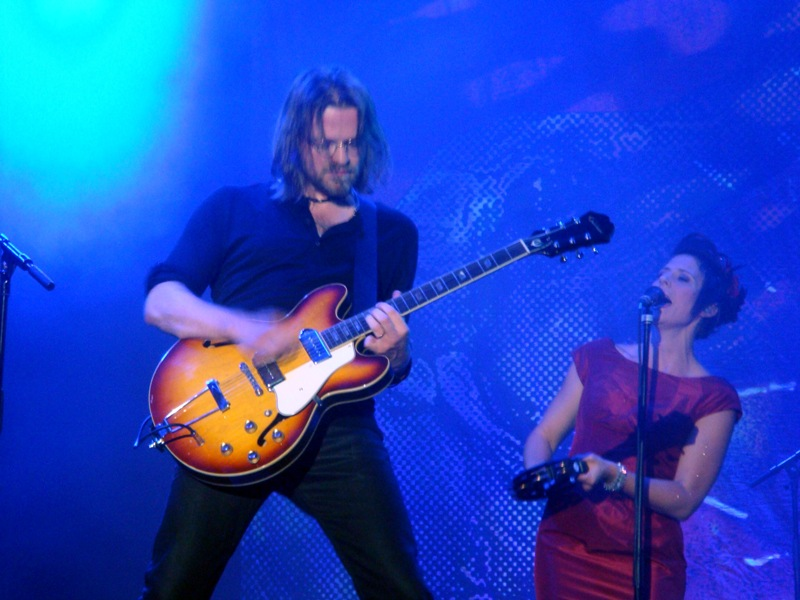
Christoffer Lundquist (guitarist) and Malin Ekstrand (backing vocals), who accompanied Roxette during the 2010 European tour

- Rock runt riket ("Rock Around the Kingdom") Swedish Tour (with Eva Dahlgren and Ratata) (1987)
- Look Sharp '88! Tour Swedish Tour (1988)
- Look Sharp Live! European Tour (1989)
- Join the Joyride! Tour (1991–92)
- Join the Summer Joyride – European Tour (1992)
- Crash! Boom! Bang! Tour (1994–95)
- Room Service Tour (2001)
- Night of the Proms (2009) (Classic meets Pop – headliner, with several artists)
- The Neverending World Tour (2009–16)
- Per Gessle's Roxette – European Tour (2018)
- Roxette Concert 2025 (2025)

== See also ==
- Join the Flumeride – a mockumentary of two fictional bands parodying Roxette and Gyllene Tider, and featuring a cameo appearance by Per Gessle.
- List of artists who reached number one in the United States
- List of bands named after other performers' songs
- List of Billboard number-one singles
- List of Swedes in music
- Swedish popular music
- PG Roxette
