= The Look =

1989 song by Roxette

Single by Roxette

from the album Look Sharp!
- B-side: "Silver Blue" (demo)
- Released: 12 January 1989
- Recorded: May–August 1988
- Studio: EMI (Stockholm, Sweden)
- Genre: Pop rock; glam rock; synth-rock
- Length: 3:57
- Label: EMI
- Songwriter: Per Gessle
- Producer: Clarence Öfwerman

Roxette singles chronology
"Chances" (1988)	"The Look" (1989)	"Dangerous" (1989)

Music video
- "The Look" on YouTube

"The Look" is a song by Swedish pop duo Roxette. It was released in early 1989 as the fourth single from their second studio album, Look Sharp! (1988). It became an international hit, and was one of the most successful singles of 1989. It topped the charts in 25 countries, and was the first of their four number ones on the Billboard Hot 100. The song received mostly positive reviews from music critics.

== Background ==
The duo released their second album Look Sharp! in October 1988. It was an immediate commercial success in their home country, spending seven weeks at number one on the Swedish Albums Chart. "Dressed for Success" and "Listen to Your Heart" were released as the album's first two singles in Sweden, both becoming top three hits there. "Chances" was released in Germany and France as the first international single from the album.

== Composition and style ==
"It still sounds special and different. It's got great production. It makes you smile. It sounds like a hit record, doesn't it? Looking back on 35 years of professional songwriting, I know how hard it is to write uptempo catchy hits without following a formula, so I'm really proud of it."

— Gessle talking about "The Look" to Billboard magazine in 2015.

"The Look" was written by Per Gessle as an exercise while learning how to operate the Ensoniq ESQ-1 synthesizer he had recently purchased, using a repeated A–G–D bass line as the song's core. The track's sixteenth-note rhythm was inspired by the work of ZZ Top. The first two verses are composed of guide lyrics, with Gessle explaining he "scribbled [them] down instantly just to remember the rhythm. But they stuck in my head. 'Walking like a man, hitting like a hammer...', it all had a great groove. And in some pseudo-psychedelic way à la 'I Am the Walrus', it all seemed to make sense." He found it "impossible" to replace the lyrics when trying to rewrite them later, and said he sought to balance the lyrical content by making the "rest of the lyrics intelligent in some way."

A demo for the song was recorded at the Tits & Ass Studio in Halmstad in March 1988. The original title was "He's Got the Look", with the lyrics using male pronouns. Gessle said this was done because he initially wanted Marie Fredriksson to sing the track. Both he and EMI Sweden had chosen to highlight Fredriksson as Roxette's lead vocalist. However, when recording the demo, Gessle realised the song "didn't fit her style that well, so I had a go and it sounded OK." He said the song immediately had a "special power", saying that the demo "stood out; it was a great song. Everyone loved it. The only negative thing I could think of was that I was singing it, because that wasn't the idea [behind Roxette]."

Anders Herrlin, the bassist in Gessle's former band Gyllene Tider, was integral in the recording of the song's electronic components. Gessle sought to avoid the "live band" sound present on Roxette's debut album Pearls of Passion; Herrlin programmed eight digital snare drums in the intro alone, and "maybe 20 or so other effects" throughout the track. According to Gessle, guitarist Jonas Isacsson also had a "big impact" on the song, saying: "We asked him to play something in the style of George Harrison's "I Want to Tell You" and "Taxman" from Revolver, and off he went. Great cocky riffs." Isacsson said the main guitar riff was written several days earlier while composing songs with then-girlfriend Marianne Flynner. Upon playing the riff during the recording of "The Look", Isacsson said Gessle, producer Clarence Öfwerman and engineer Alar Suurna "went bonkers", and that Gessle "instantly wanted it as opening riff for the song."

According to Ultimate Guitar, the track features an unusual song structure. Each verse is composed of an A–G–D–A sequence, followed by a chorus of A–A–C–G–A–C–G–A–A–F–G–A, with the second chorus containing an additional A at the end. The second chorus is proceeded by a guitar solo of E–A–G/A–E–A–E–A–E–A–G–D–A–G–D–A–A. The song then descends to a spoken bridge consisting of an A–G–A–G sequence, building back up with a pre-chorus of Marie Fredriksson singing an additional "Na na na na na" refrain, which repeats the same sequence from the initial verses albeit modified up by almost two octaves. An abbreviated outro consisting of C–G–A–C–G–A–A–F–G then follows, before the song abruptly stops. A coda of A–G–D–A then repeats until the song fades out.

== Commercial performance ==
"The Look" was issued in Sweden on 12 January 1989, as the third single from Look Sharp! in that country. The track was an immediate commercial success there, peaking at number six and spending almost two months in the top ten of the then-fortnightly Sverigetopplistan chart. The song was certified gold by the Swedish Recording Industry Association for shipments in excess of 25,000 units. Around the same time, an American exchange student from Minnesota named Dean Cushman returned from Sweden and gave his copy of the album to his local Top 40 radio station, KDWB-FM in Minneapolis. The station's program director Brian Phillips initially ignored Cushman's request to play a song from the album, leaving the CD unplayed in his office for several weeks. Phillips eventually listened to it after learning Cushman had come to the office requesting the return of his CD. Immediately impressed by the album's opening track, "The Look" was played by the station for the first time on US radio less than an hour later, and the response from listeners was overwhelmingly positive; the station immediately began receiving phone calls to replay the track.

KDWB began distributing the track to their sister radio operations, sending 500 copies to other stations throughout the United States. EMI America promptly signed the duo to a recording contract as a result of the airplay. The label had previously rejected Roxette as "unsuitable for the American market". The song had already entered the top fifty of the Billboard Hot 100 before official promotion began, peaking at number one on the chart eight weeks later. This made "The Look" the third number one single by a Swedish act on the Billboard Hot 100, following Blue Swede's "Hooked on a Feeling" in 1974 and ABBA's "Dancing Queen" in 1976.

The track went on to top the charts in 25 countries. It spent three weeks atop the New Zealand Singles Chart, and six weeks at number one in Australia, where it was certified platinum for sales in excess of 70,000 copies. It also topped the charts throughout Scandinavia, peaking at number one in Denmark, Finland and Norway, and was certified gold in the former country for shipments in excess of 45,000 units. The song spent five weeks at number one in West Germany, and an additional five weeks at number two. The song was a massive success in Spain and Switzerland, spending eight weeks at number one in both countries. In the United Kingdom, where "The Look" was released on 13 March 1989, it reached number seven on the UK Singles Chart.

After the song became a hit in the United States, rumours circulated within the American press that Cushman had been paid to bring the song to the attention of KDWB. Fredriksson categorically denied these rumours in an interview with the Los Angeles Times in 1990, saying: "If you hear that we paid that exchange student to take our record to that radio station, don't believe it." Gessle later said: "I wish we were that clever! It was a complete fluke." Phillips said of Cushman: "He did what great promotion men in the music business do. He was persistent. He kept calling. And finally he shows up at the radio station and sits in the lobby: 'Listen, what are you gonna do about my CD?' And without that persistence, it's a very different world for Roxette." Cushman eventually befriended Gessle and Fredriksson, who autographed the same CD he had submitted to KDWB.

== Critical reception ==
While reviewing the track, several publications favourably compared Roxette to fellow Swedish act ABBA. Music & Media dubbed it the single of the week, and said the vocal harmonising in the refrain was the best part of the song. They went on to comment: "Time will tell if they manage to be as productive as the legendary foursome, but this tense, atmospheric Beatle-esque song definitely marks a step in the right direction." People Magazine also compared the duo to ABBA, saying the song has "bounce and kick", while AllMusic called the song "bright" and "shiny".

Bill Coleman from Billboard said "The Look" was "too catchy for words", describing it as a "pop track that incorporates an eager rock edge and funky rhythm underpinnings." A writer for Stereogum noted an inability to define the genre of the track, saying that despite its disparate influences, the song was neither rock, dance or funk. Although they commented on the lyrics, which they described as "nonsense", they went on to say the song "sounds colossal. After the fake ending, when everything goes silent for a couple of seconds and then comes rushing back, it sounds even more colossal. You can waste all your effort on trying to write lyrics that make sense, or you can focus your energy on making something like that happen. Roxette chose wisely."

Stephen Thomas Erlewine, in a 2019 report for Billboard, said the song was "glam rock for the age of George H. W. Bush: stylized and stylish on the surface, yet classically structured at its core. Equal parts craft and trash, it was the platonic ideal of a hit pop single." He also commented on the route the song took to commercial success, saying: "It was a hit single lying in wait, ready for the right ears to recognize [its] potential. That it was discovered by an exchange student and a programmer from the Midwest (KDWB in Minnesota) remains one of the minor miracles of late-'80s pop." In a 2021 article for Stereogum Tom Breihan called it "an insidiously catchy synth-rock jam".

== Music video ==
The music video was directed by Peter Heath and filmed in a studio in New York City. The duo perform the song in a messy, colorful room, while interacting with a group of women.

== Formats and track listings ==
All songs were written and composed by Per Gessle.

- 7-inch single (Sweden 136336 · UK EM87 · US B-50190)
- Cassette (UK TCEM87 · US 4JM-50190)
1. "The Look" – 3:56
2. "Silver Blue" (demo) – 4:05
- International 12-inch single (Sweden 1363336 · UK 12EM87 · Australia ED408)
1. "The Look" (Head Drum mix) – 7:22
2. "The Look" (7-inch version) – 3:58
3. "Silver Blue" (demo) – 4:05
- US 12-inch single (V-56133)
1. "The Look" (Visible mix) – 6:03
2. "The Look" (Power Radio mix) – 4:09
3. "The Look" (Big Red mix) – 7:33
4. "The Look" (Invisible dub) – 5:11
5. "Silver Blue" (demo) – 4:00
- CD single (Sweden 1363332 · UK CDEM87)
1. "The Look" (Head Drum mix) – 7:22
2. "The Look" (7-inch version) – 3:58
3. "Silver Blue" (demo) – 4:06
4. "Sleeping Single" (demo) – 3:46

== Credits and personnel ==
Credits are adapted from the liner notes of The Rox Box/Roxette 86–06.

- Recorded between May and August 1988 at EMI Studios (Stockholm, Sweden)
- Mixed at EMI Studios (Stockholm, Sweden)

Musicians

- Per Gessle – lead and background vocals, mixing
- Marie Fredriksson – lead and background vocals
- Per "Pelle" Alsing – hi-hat
- Anders Herrlin – programming and engineering
- Jonas Isacsson – electric guitars
- Clarence Öfwerman – keyboards, programming, production, mixing
- Alar Suurna – mixing, engineering

== Charts ==
=== Weekly charts ===
Chart (1989)	Peak position
Australia (ARIA)	1
Austria (Ö3 Austria Top 40)	2
Belgium (Ultratop 50 Flanders)	3
Canada Retail Singles (The Record)	1
Canada Top Singles (RPM)	2
Canada Dance/Urban (RPM)	13
Denmark (IFPI)	1
Europe (European Hot 100)	1
Finland (Suomen virallinen lista)	1
France (SNEP)	12
Ireland (IRMA)	10
Italy (Musica e dischi)	4
Italy Airplay (Music & Media)	4
Netherlands (Dutch Top 40)	2
Netherlands (Single Top 100)	2
New Zealand (Recorded Music NZ)	1
Norway (VG-lista)	1
Peru (UPI)	8
Portugal (AFP)	2
Spain (AFYVE)	1
Sweden (Sverigetopplistan)	6
Switzerland (Schweizer Hitparade)	1
UK Singles (Official Charts)	7
US Billboard Hot 100	1
US Dance Club Songs (Billboard)	47
US Cash Box Top 100	2
US Top 40 (Gavin Report)	1
US Contemporary Hit Radio (Radio & Records)	1
West Germany (GfK)	1

Chart (2019–2020)	Peak position
Australian Digital Tracks (ARIA)	34
Poland Airplay (ZPAV)	94
Scottish Singles Sales (Official Charts)	83
UK Singles Downloads (Official Charts)	96

=== Year-end charts ===
Chart (1989)	Position
Australia (ARIA)	2
Austria (Ö3 Austria Top 40)	2
Belgium (Ultratop)	24
Canada Top Singles (RPM)	10
Europe (European Hot 100)	5
Netherlands (Dutch Top 40)	10
Netherlands (Single Top 100)	43
New Zealand (RIANZ)	2
Switzerland (Schweizer Hitparade)	2
US Billboard Hot 100	17
US Cash Box Top 100	6
US Top 40 (Gavin Report)	2
US Contemporary Hit Radio (Radio & Records)	16
West Germany (Media Control)	4

== Certifications ==
Region	Certification	Certified units/sales
Australia (ARIA)	Platinum	70,000^{^}
Canada (Music Canada)	Gold	50,000^{^}
Denmark (IFPI Danmark)	Platinum	90,000^{‡}
New Zealand (RMNZ)	Platinum	30,000^{‡}
Spain (Promusicae)	Gold	30,000^{‡}
Sweden (GLF)	Gold	25,000^{^}
United Kingdom (BPI)	Gold	400,000^{‡}
United States (RIAA)	Gold	500,000^{^}
^{^} Shipments figures based on certification alone.^{‡} Sales+streaming figures based on certification alone.

== Release history ==
Region	Date	Format(s)	Label(s)	Ref.
Europe	12 January 1989	7-inch vinyl; 12-inch vinyl; CD	EMI	
United States	February 1989	7-inch vinyl; 12-inch vinyl; cassette	EMI USA	
United Kingdom	13 March 1989	7-inch vinyl; 12-inch vinyl; CD	EMI	
Japan	8 April 1989	Mini-CD	EMI	

== 1995 remix ==
"The Look '95"

Single by Roxette

from the album Don't Bore Us, Get to the Chorus! Roxette's Greatest Hits
- B-side: "Crazy About You"
- Released: 13 November 1995
- Length: 5:08
- Label: EMI United Kingdom
- Songwriter: Per Gessle
- Producer: Clarence Öfwerman

Roxette singles chronology
"You Don't Understand Me" (1995)	"The Look '95" (1995)	"June Afternoon" (1996)

"The Look" was remixed in 1995 and re-released exclusively in the United Kingdom in conjunction with the release of their first greatest hits compilation, Don't Bore Us, Get to the Chorus! Roxette's Greatest Hits. This version of the song does not appear on the album, but two of the versions from this were eventually included on the European single "She Doesn't Live Here Anymore" (1996).

=== Formats and track listings ===
- UK CD1 (CDEMS406)
1. "The Look" (Chaps 1995 remix) – 5:08
2. "The Look" (Chaps Donna Bass mix) – 6:53
3. "The Look" (Rapino club mix) – 5:22
4. "The Look" (Rapino dub mix) – 5:14
- UK CD2 (CDEMS406)
1. "The Look" (Chaps 1995 remix) – 5:10
2. "The Look" (original version) – 3:59
3. "Crazy About You" – 3:59
4. "Dressed for Success" (U.S. mix) – 4:53

=== Charts ===
Chart (1995)	Peak position
Scotland (OCC)	33
UK Singles (Official Charts)	28
UK Club Chart (Music Week)	55

== 2015 remake ==
"The Look (2015 Remake)"

Single by Roxette
- Released: 17 July 2015
- Recorded: X-Level Studios
- Genre: Electropop
- Length: 3:58
- Label: Cosmos
- Songwriter: Per Gessle
- Producers: Clarence Öfwerman; Gessle; Christoffer Lundquist; Addeboy vs Cliff

Roxette singles chronology
"The Sweet Hello, The Sad Goodbye (Bassflow Remake)" (2012)	"The Look (2015 Remake)" (2015)	"It Just Happens" (2016)

"The Look" was remixed again in 2015 and released as a non-album single under Cosmos Music Group on 17 July 2015. This "2015 Remake" was produced by Gessle, Clarence Öfwerman and Christoffer Lundquist. Additional production was credited to Swedish duo Addeboy vs Cliff, who had recently contributed material to Roxette's then-upcoming tenth studio album Good Karma, later released in 2016. Swedish fashion label KappAhl approached Gessle about using a medley of Roxette songs for an upcoming advertising campaign in Scandinavia, although Gessle instead decided to create an exclusive remix for "The Look". This new version was recorded over the course of two days at X-Level Studios in Stockholm, formerly EMI Studios—the same studio where the track had originally been recorded in 1988. It features new vocals from Gessle and Marie Fredriksson.

=== Formats and track listings ===
- Digital download and 7-inch single (334–43545)
1. "The Look" (2015 Remake) – 3:58
2. "The Look" (2015 Remake) (Instrumental) – 3:55

=== Charts ===
Chart (2015)	Peak position
Swedish Digital Songs (Sverigetopplistan)	38

== Cover versions ==
- Candlelight Red included a modern rock cover of the song on their 2011 album The Wreckage, and released the single "She's Got the Look" in March 2012.
- Breaking Benjamin guitarist Keith Wallen covered this song in 2019, in addition to releasing it as a single.

== Appearances in other media ==
The first appearance of "The Look" on a television show was during a montage featuring Erika Eleniak and Chris Gartin in the Baywatch episode "The Cretin of the Shallows" from the first season broadcast on 1 December 1989.

In 2009, the song was prominently featured in a marketing campaign for Grand Theft Auto IV Episodes from Liberty City.

The song was covered by Taiwanese artist Luantan Ascent (亂彈阿翔). It was used as an insert song for the film Second Chance (逆轉勝) and was also featured in its promotional teaser trailer.

The season 2 premiere episode of the FOX series Scream Queens featured the song in a scene where the Chanels see Dr. Brock Holt showering in the hospital locker room.

The song was used as the opening theme of episode 2 of the 2017 Netflix TV series GLOW.

An a cappella version is used in a commercial for the 2018 Toyota Camry.

The song is featured in the trailer for the 2019 film 47 Meters Down: Uncaged as well as a scene in the movie.
