= Christoffer Lundquist =

Swedish musician and producer (born 16 January 1970)

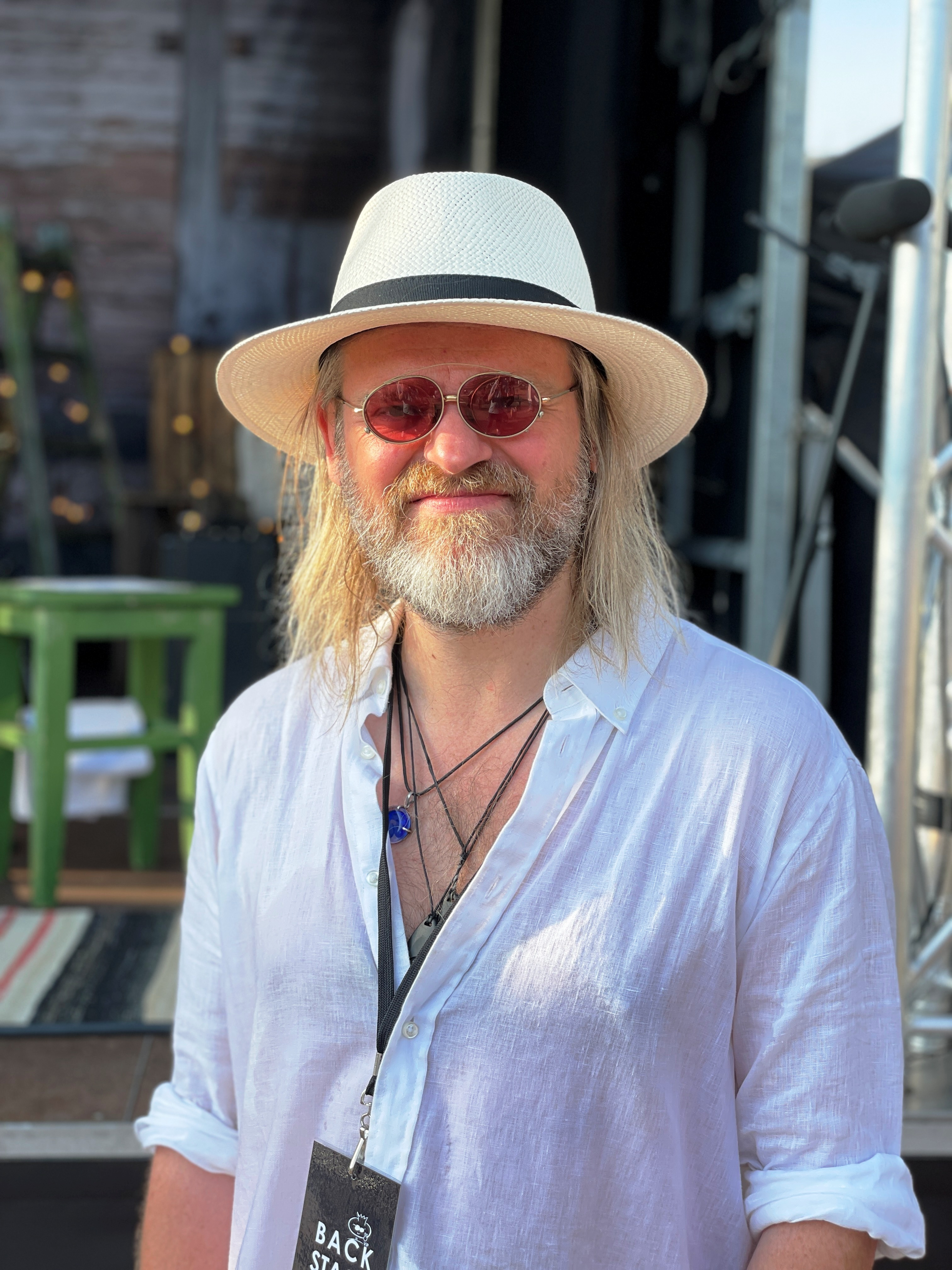
- Lundquist, 2021

Background information
- Origin: Sweden, born 16 January 1970
- Genres: Pop, Rock
- Occupation(s): Bass guitarist, Electric guitarist, Producer
- Years active: 1993–present
- Website: AGMSweden

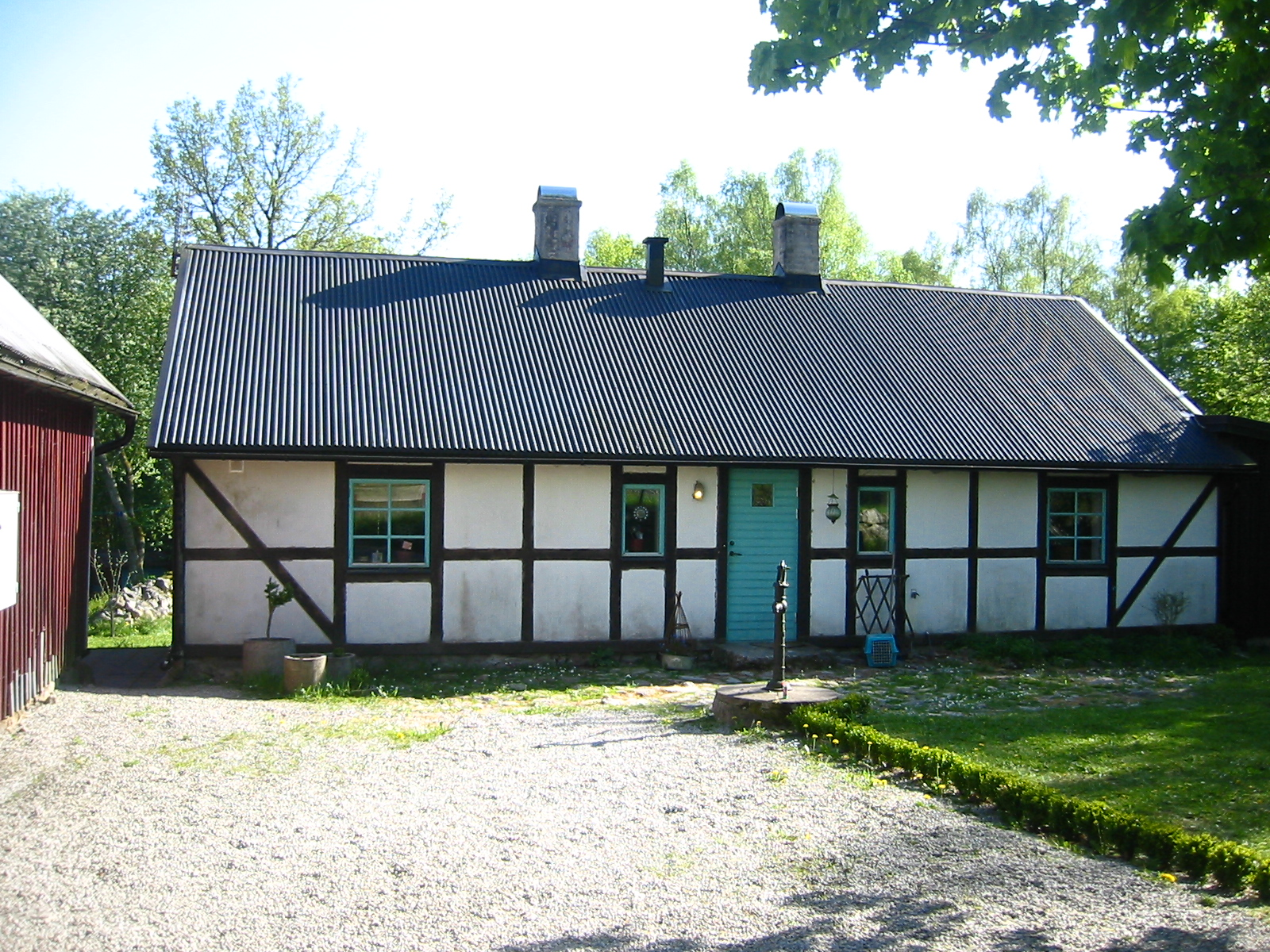
The Aerosol Gray Machine Studio in Vallarum, Scania, where Lundquist records and produces his music.

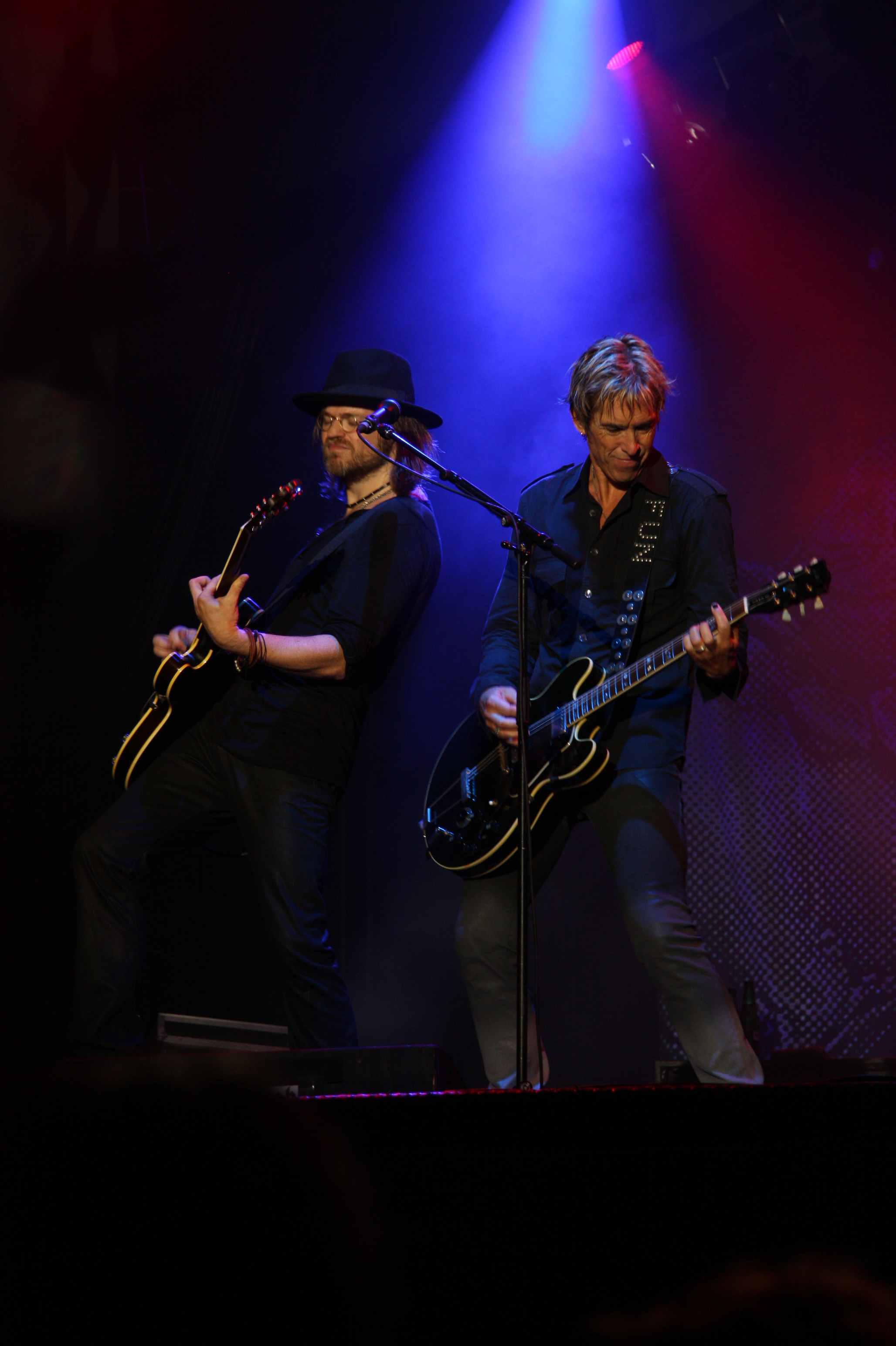
Lundquist plays alongside Per Gessle at the Roxette Concert in Halmstad 14 August 2010

Carl Christoffer Lundquist (born 16 January 1970) is a Swedish musician and producer. He was once in the band Brainpool, where he started as a bass player and backing vocalist, but moved to play both the bass and the guitar. Brainpool won a Swedish Grammy in 1994 (best new band). He has also produced albums by Roxette, Per Gessle and Gyllene Tider and played bass and backing vocals in Roxette and participated in Gessle's solo projects.

He has his own studio in the rural south of Sweden, The Aerosol Grey Machine Studio (AGM) in Vallarum, Scania. The AGM is primarily an analogue studio with much vintage equipment and two live echo chambers. Since its start in 1998, the AGM has hosted a vast selection of both Swedish and international artists like Roxette, Per Gessle, Ed Harcourt, Ulf Lundell, Gyllene Tider, Thåström, Bo Sundström, Wilmer X, Christian Kjellvander, Helena Josefsson, Sandy Mouche, Peter von Poehl, Edda Magnason, and Moneybrother.

In May 2011, Lundquist released his debut solo album, Through the Window, which reached #29 on the Swedish album chart. All the songs on the album were co-written with songwriter Michael Saxell. Also in May, Lundquist was the first person to be awarded the Sir George Martin Award at a gala event in Malmö, Sweden. The award came with SEK100,000.

== Discography ==
- Through the Window (2011)
