= GT25 Live! =

2004 Gyllene Tider live album

GT25 Live! - En scen vid en plats

Live album by Gyllene Tider
- Released: 24 November 2004
- Genre: Pop

Gyllene Tider chronology
Finn 5 fel! (2004)	GT25 Live! - En scen vid en plats (2004)	Dags att tänka på refrängen (2013)

GT25 Live! - En scen vid en plats is a live album from Swedish pop group Gyllene Tider, released on 24 November 2004. The album includes live performances from the group's 2004 25th anniversary tour.

== Track listing ==
1. "Intro: GT25" - 0.44
2. "En sten vid en sjö i en skog" - 2:35 (Jönköping)
3. "Juni, juli, augusti" - 3:41 (Halmstad II)
4. "(Dansar inte lika bra som) sjömän" - 2:50 (Halmstad II)
5. "Det hjärta som brinner" - 3:13 (Jönköping)
6. "Fån telefon" - 3:26 (Jönköping)
7. "Flickorna på TV 2" - 3:39 (Eskilstuna)
8. "(Hon vill ha) Puls" - 4:14 (Norrköping)
9. "Tuffa tider (för en drömmare)" - 3:31 (Helsingborg)
10. "Ljudet av ett annat hjärta" - 3:28 (Halmstad I)
11. "Ska vi älska, så ska vi älska till Buddy Holly" - 4.22 (Eskilstuna)
12. "När vi två blir en" - 4:12 (Stockholm)
13. "Det är över nu" - 3:36 (Jönköping)
14. "(Kom så ska vi) Leva livet" - 3:30 (Gothenburg)
15. "Tylö Sun" (California Sun) - 2:48 (Helsingborg)
16. "Gå & fiska!" - 4:21 (Jönköping)
17. "Billy" - 5:42 (Eskilstuna)
18. "Ta mej... nu är jag din!"
19. "Medley" - 8:43 (Halmstad II)
  1. "Sommartider"
  2. "Min tjej och jag"
  3. "Vänta på mej!"
  4. "Flickan i en Cole Porter-sång"
  5. "Sommartider"
20. "När alla vännerna gått hem" - 4:35 (Eskilstuna)

== Charts ==
Chart (2004)	Peak position
Swedish Albums (Sverigetopplistan)	28
