= Soldans på din grammofon =

2013 compilation album by Gyllene Tider

Compilation album by Gyllene Tider
- Released: 3 July 2013
- Recorded: 1979–1996
- Genre: pop
- Label: EMI Music Sweden

Gyllene Tider chronology
Dags att tänka på refrängen (2013)	Soldans på din grammofon (2013)	Samma skrot och korn (2019)

Soldans på din grammofon is a compilation album by Gyllene Tider, released on 3 July 2013. It was also released as a vinyl LP.

== Track listing ==
1. Sommartider
2. Gå & fiska!
3. En sten vid en sjö i en skog
4. Flickorna på TV2
5. (Dansar inte lika bra som) sjömän
6. När vi två blir en
7. Det hjärta som brinner
8. (Kom så ska vi) Leva livet
9. Det är över nu
10. Kung av sand
11. Marie i växeln (Switchboard Susan), Rockfile
12. Tylö Sun (California Sun)
13. Tuffa tider (för en drömmare)
14. Billy
15. Skicka ett vykort, älskling (Send Me a Postcard)
16. Juni, juli, augusti
17. Flickan i en Cole Porter-sång
18. Ljudet av ett annat hjärta
19. (Hon vill ha) puls
20. Småstad
21. Ska vi älska, så ska vi älska till Buddy Holly
22. Vandrar i ett sommarregn
23. Faller ner på knä
24. När alla vännerna gått hem
25. (Henry, dansa inte disco (en 70-talsfabel)
26. 45 minuter motorväg
27. SOS (live, rehearsal, June 1980)
28. Henry, dansa inte disco (live rehearsal, January 1980)

== Charts ==
Chart (2013)	Peak position
Sweden	4
