= GT 25 – Samtliga hits! =

GT 25 - Samtliga hits!

Compilation album by Gyllene Tider
- Released: 24 March 2004
- Recorded: 1979–1996
- Genre: Pop

Gyllene Tider chronology
Konstpaus (1997)	GT 25 - Samtliga hits! (2004)	Finn 5 fel! (2004)

GT 25 – Samtliga hits! is a compilation album from Swedish pop group Gyllene Tider, released on 24 March 2004.

== Track listing ==
1. "Flickorna på TV2"
2. "Ska vi älska, så ska vi älska till Buddy Holly"
3. "(Dansar inte lika bra som) Sjömän"
4. "Marie i växeln" (Original, "Switch Board Susan", written by Mickey Jupp)
5. "När vi två blir en"
6. "Kärleken är inte blind (Men ganska närsynt)"
7. "(Kom så ska vi) Leva livet"
8. "Det hjärta som brinner"
9. "Billy"
10. "Ljudet av ett annat hjärta"
11. "Tylö Sun"
12. "(Hon vill ha) Puls"
13. "Sommartider"
14. "Flickan i en Cole Porter-sång"
15. "Småstad" (from the single Pers garage)
16. "Det är över nu"
17. "Kung av sand"
18. "Gå & fiska!"
19. "Juni, juli, augusti"
20. "Faller ner på knä"
21. "När alla vännerna gått hem"

== Charts ==
=== Weekly charts ===
Chart (2004)	Peak position
Norwegian Albums (VG-lista)	6
Swedish Albums (Sverigetopplistan)	1

=== Year-end charts ===
Chart (2004)	Position
Swedish Albums (Sverigetopplistan)	12

== Certifications ==
Region	Certification
Sweden	Platinum
