= Återtåget Live! =

Live album by Gyllene Tider
- Released: 17 November 1997
- Genre: Pop

Gyllene Tider chronology
Ljudet av ett annat hjärta/En samling (1997)	Återtåget Live! (1997)	Konstpaus (2000)

Återtåget Live! is a live album from Swedish pop group Gyllene Tider, released on 17 November 1997. The album contains live recordings from the group's summer tour Återtåget, which was held in Sweden in mid 1996. The recordings were made at Trädgårdsföreningen in Gothenburg, Sweden on 3 and 5 August 1996. It reached #19 on the Swedish albums chart.

== Track listing ==
1. "Skicka ett vykort, älskling" ("Send Me a Postcard")
2. "Det hjärta som brinner"
3. "(Dansar inte lika bra som) sjömän"
4. "Flickorna på TV 2"
5. "Juni, juli, augusti"
6. "Ljudet av ett annat hjärta"
7. "Billy"
8. "(Hon vill ha) puls"
9. "Gå & fiska!"
10. "(Kom så ska vi) leva livet"
11. "Ska vi älska, så ska vi älska till Buddy Holly"
12. "Tylö Sun" (California Sun)
13. "Det är över nu"
14. "Kung av sand"
15. "Sommartider-Flickan i en Cole Porter-sång"
16. "Marie i växeln" (Switchboard Susan)
17. "När vi två blir en"
18. "När alla vännerna gått hem"

== Charts ==
Chart (1997)	Peak position
Swedish Album Chart	19
