= Ska vi älska, så ska vi älska till Buddy Holly =

- Swedish single sleeve, with Buddy Holly depicted on the single label.

Single by Gyllene Tider

from the album Gyllene Tider
- Language: Swedish
- English title: "If We're Making Love, We're Making Love to Buddy Holly"
- A-side: (Dansar inte lika bra som) Sjömän" (double A-side)
- Released: 27 May 1980
- Recorded: August – September 1979
- Studio: EMI, Stockholm
- Genre: Boogie rock; power pop
- Length: 3:44
- Label: Parlophone
- Songwriters: Per Gessle; Mats Persson
- Producer: Lasse Lindbom

Gyllene Tider singles chronology
"Himmel No. 7 / Flickorna på TV2" (1979)	"Ska vi älska, så ska vi älska till Buddy Holly" / "(Dansar inte lika bra som) Sjömän" (1980)	"När vi två blir en" (1980)

Audio
- "Ska vi älska, så ska vi älska till Buddy Holly" on YouTube

"Ska vi älska, så ska vi älska till Buddy Holly" ("If We're Making Love, We're Making Love to Buddy Holly") is a song by Swedish rock band Gyllene Tider, written by their vocalist Per Gessle and guitarist Mats "MP" Persson. Gessle composed the lyrics to the song in February 1979 during the 20th anniversary of Buddy Holly's death. He was lyrically inspired by a poem written by one of his friends, setting it to an older musical boogie song written by Persson. Musically, "Ska vi älska" is a boogie rock power pop song characterized by a repeating guitar riff and organ hook. Lyrically, the song features several references to popular culture and is about a woman who wants to make love listening to the music of Buddy Holly, who is mentioned by named during the chorus. The song was recorded at EMI's studio in Stockholm during August and September 1979.

Initially, "Ska vi älska, så ska vi älska till Buddy Holly" was released on Gyllene Tider's debut album Gyllene Tider in February 1980 by Parlophone. However, as the band's debut single "Flickorna på TV2" (1979) was dropping out of the charts and Gyllene Tider did not have any new suitable material for single release, Parlophone culled "Ska vi älska" and "(Dansar inte lika bra som) Sjömän" from the album and released the tracks as a double A-side single on 27 May 1980. The single was boasted by the success of "Flickorna" and their debut album, peaking at number eight on Swedish charts Topplistan and selling 10,000 copies in Sweden, despite being called a commercial failure by the band. The single was met with primarily positive reviews in the press with focus on the lyrical content and boogie rock style, though was noted as weaker than "Flickorna". It has appeared on several compilation albums and was a mainstay in tour set lists.

== Composition and recording ==
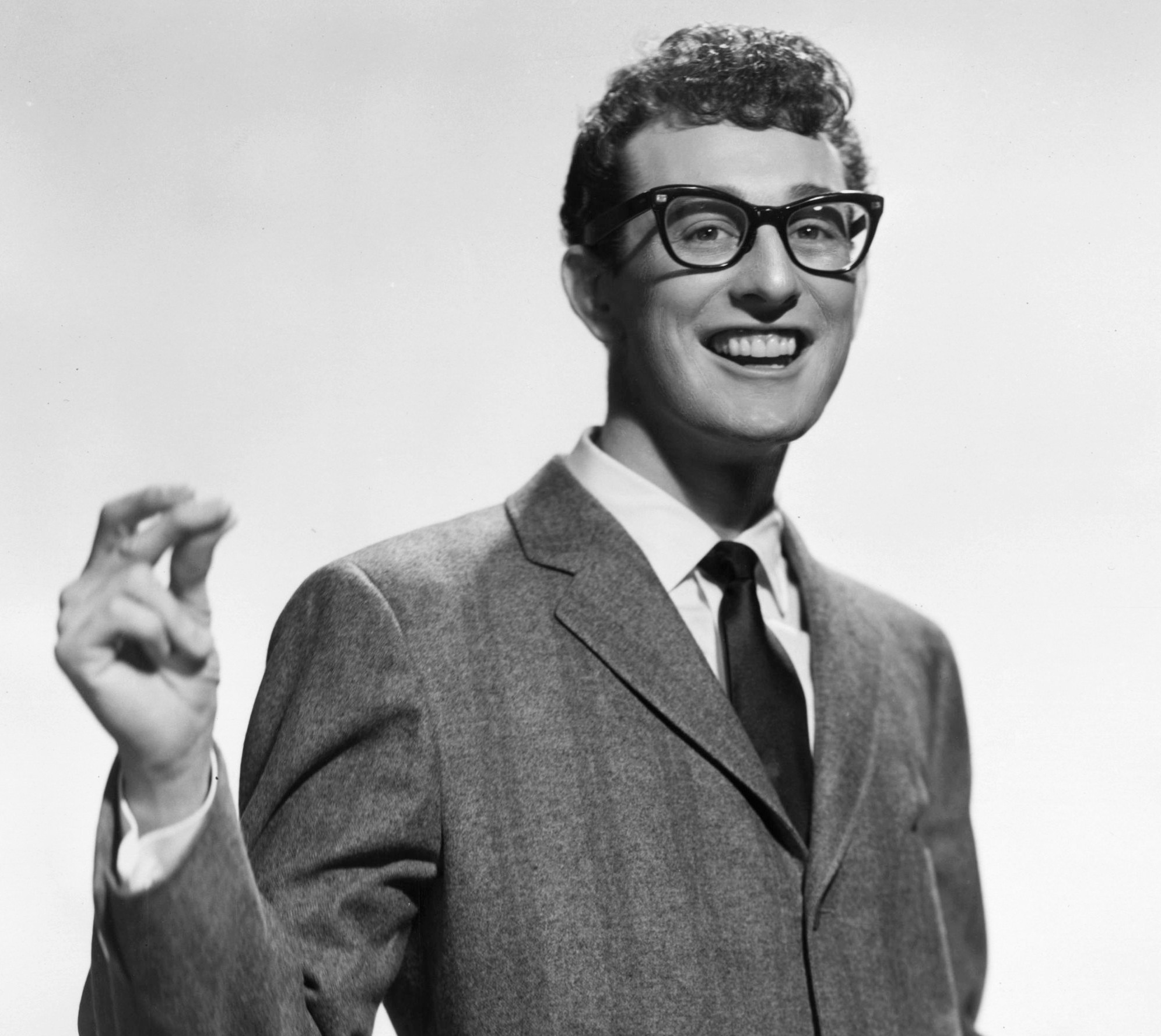
The song was written as a tribute to American musician Buddy Holly, who is mentioned during the song's chorus.

According to Gyllene Tider's lead vocalist Per Gessle, he wrote the lyrics for "Ska vi älska, så ska vi älska till Buddy Holly" in February 1979, a month which coincided with the 20th anniversary of Buddy Holly's death in what would be dubbed the Day the Music Died. This was additionally part of a songwriting marathon embarked on by Gessle following a January 1979 phone call by EMI's A & R man Kjell Andersson expressing interest in Gyllene Tider's music. Gessle stated that the text was primarily influenced by a Halmstad friend of his, Martin, who had written a poem titled "Om du vill ha mej, så får du ta mej till rock 'n' roll" ("If You Want Me, You'll Have to Take Me With rock 'n' roll"). Gessle then set those lyrics to the music of an old throwaway song that had been composed by the band's lead guitarist Mats "MP" Persson, an "old boogie" titled "Beach Boy Boogie", alternatively known as "Strandraggarboogie" ("Beach Raggare Boogie").

As originally recorded by Gyllene Tider, "Ska vi älska, så ska vi älska till Buddy Holly" is a song written in A major that has 135 beats per minute. Unlike most songs in their discography, "Ska vi älska" is primarily based in boogie rock with elements of power pop, something that is characterized by the repetitive guitar riff played by Gessle and Persson, alongside the re-iterating Farfisa organ hook played by band keyboardist Göran Fritzon. Lyrically, "Ska vi älska" is a tribute to Holly and part filled with popular culture references that journalist Andres Lokko argues is a common motif in Gessle's lyrics, and features 3 verses and 4 choruses. The lyrics tell the tale of a man meeting a woman who looks like American celebrity Jimmy Dean, who has listened to 1950s rock 'n' roll and particularly records by Holly as requirements for him to make love to her, repeated in the choruses. Holly's songs "Peggy Sue" (1957), "It's So Easy!" (1958) and "It Doesn't Matter Anymore" (1959) are all mentioned by name in one verse. The Rolling Stones "(I Can't Get No) Satisfaction" (1965) is mentioned in the same verse as two of Gyllene Tider's biggest inspirations, Elvis Costello and the Attractions, both of which are referenced to as "modern shit" in a tongue-in-cheek manner. The final verse implies the narrator is denied sexual consent because he does not own rock 'n' roll 45rpm singles suitable to make love to.

As with a row of other songs written by Gessle and Persson during the time, "Ska vi älska, så ska vi älska till Buddy Holly" was recorded as a demo that was part of an 11-track cassette tape Gessle mailed from Halmstad to EMI in Stockholm. "Ska vi älska" was recorded during one session of Gyllene Tider's six weeks recording at EMI's studio 2 in Skärmarbrink during the period of August to September of 1979. At the time the studio used a 16-track recorder, which the band used to their advantage by utilizing it for several overdubs, especially for Fritzon who played both electric piano and Farfisa organ on the track. In addition to playing guitar and drums respectively, Persson and Micke "Syd" Andersson also contribute backing vocals to the recording. EMI's in-house record producer Lasse Lindbom produced the sessions, in addition to mixing the song together with Gessle, Persson and Björn Boström.

== Release and commercial performance ==
The initial release of "Ska vi älska, så ska vi älska till Buddy Holly" occurred on 18 February 1980, when it was included on Gyllene Tider's eponymous debut album which was released through the recently re-activated EMI sublabel Parlophone. (Note: Catalogue number Parlophone 7C 062-35709.) On the album, it is sequenced on side two between "När ni faller, faller ni hårt" ("When You Fall, You Fall Hard") and the closing track "Guld" ("Gold"). By the time of the album's release, Gyllene Tider's 1979 debut single "Flickorna på TV2" ("The Girls on Channel Two") had reached number 1 on Swedish record chart Topplistan, but had started descending down the chart by May 1980. Due to a lack of suitable new material for a follow-up single, Parlophone culled "Ska vi älska" from the album and released it as Gyllene Tider's second single on 27 May 1980. (Note: Catalogue number Parlophone 7C 006-35758.) The original Parlophone release was a double A-side on yellow vinyl coupled with "(Dansar inte lika bra som) Sjömän" ("(Don't Dance As Well As) Sailors"). However, it was "Ska vi älska" which was noted in the charts. The single label on "Ska vi älska" is a black and yellow image of Buddy Holly playing guitar.

"Everything happens all at once for Gyllene Tider during the winter and spring of 1980; Second single "Ska vi älska, så ska vi älska till Buddy Holly" becomes yet another hit. They appear in SVT's show Måndagsbörsen. If you during this time were part of a big television show everybody would've watched it, there were only two television channels."

— Kjell Andersson regarding Gyllene Tider's successes at the time.

Fueled largely by the successes of "Flickorna", the album's release and an appearance on Sweden's Television's programme Måndagsbörsen, "Ska vi älska, så ska vi älska till Buddy Holly" entered the official Topplistan chart on 13 June 1980 at a position of number 18. "Ska vi älska" peaked at number eight on 11 July, before dropping off the chart on 22 August at a position of number 22, having spent six weeks on the chart, four of which it was in the top-10. By April 1981, "Ska vi älska" had sold roughly 10,000 copies, enough for it to be certified gold in Sweden at the time. Additionally, Poporama, whose host had disqualified Gyllene Tider because of a publicity stunt involving "Flickorna på TV2", labelled "Ska vi älska as a "smash hit", reaching number one on their chart. Despite reaching the top-ten in Sweden and being certified, the brief time the song spent on the charts and peak position left the Gyllene Tider members to call it a chart failure, as "Flickorna" had reached number one and spent twice as many weeks on the chart.

In addition to being release on Gyllene Tider's debut album, "Ska vi älska, så ska vi älska till Buddy Holly" has additionally been included on most compilation albums by the band, including Instant Hits! (1989), (Note: Catalogue number Parlophone 7930171.) Halmstads pärlor (1995), (Note: Catalogue number Parlophone 4751492.) GT 25 – Samtliga hits! (2004), (Note: Catalogue number Parlophone 7243 5 76959 2 3.) and Soldans på din grammofon (2013). (Note: Catalogue number Parlophone 50999 019086 2 6.) A live rendition, which was recorded on 31 July 1981 in Mjölby was captured on both audio and film and released as part of the live album Parkliv! in 1990. (Note: Catalogue number Parlophone 7942232.) Additionally, the song was also recorded live and released on albums during three of Gyllene Tiders re-unions; first on the Återtåget Live! (1997), (Note: Catalogue number Parlophone 7243 8 23657 2 3.) and later on GT25 Live! (2004), (Note: Catalogue number Capitol 7243 560375 2 6) and GT40 Live! (2019), (Note: Catalogue number Elevator Entertainment 334 43874.) respectively.

== Critical reception and legacy ==
Upon original release in Sweden, "Ska vi älska, så ska vi älska till Buddy Holly" received primarily positive reviews in the press. In a review of Gyllene Tider's debut album in Aftonbladet, the song was compared to another album track "Fån telefån" ("Fool Telefool"), with a critic noting the "driving, repetitive guitar riffs" in both songs. However, "Ska vi älska" is given a slight edge because of its "cool, Southern influences". In another article, a reviewer also wrote that "Ska vi Älska" was one of the songs on the album "worth listening to". The critic found the references to Elvis Costello comedic yet influential, as it put Swedish music into an international perspective. A reviewer for Göteborgs-Tidningen called the song a "suitable single" because it "was really easy to sing along to the chorus", yet pointed out the negative mention of the Rolling Stones' "(I Can't Get No) Satisfaction", which, according to the critic, was a "much better song". In Expressen, "Ska vi älska" is named as a suitable follow-up to "Flickorna på TV2", but is considered a weaker track than the predecessor. It is however praised for being more "lyrically interesting" than "Flickorna".

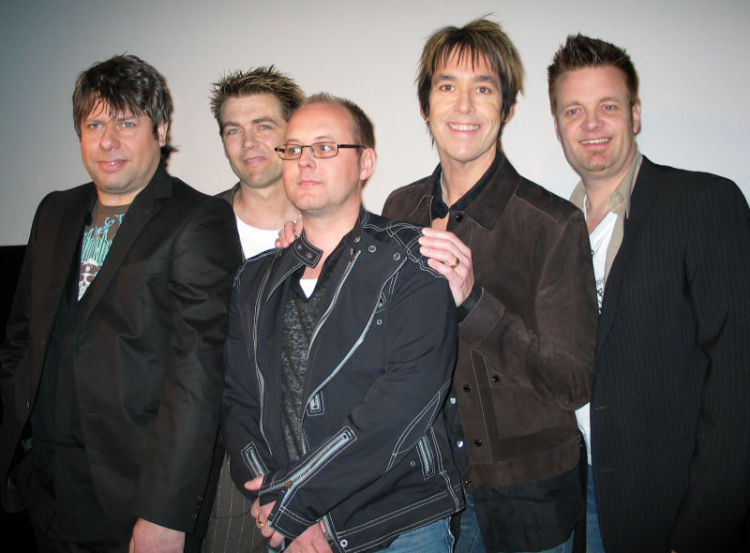
The song became a mainstay on Gyllene Tider's live repertoire, including their performances in 2004.

In retrospect, some journalists criticized "Ska vi älska, så ska vi älska till Buddy Holly". Daniel Claeson of Hallands Nyheter stated that a song referencing love twice in the title "written" by teenagers with moped moustaches" should be "disqualified from public events". In addition, he finds the song's boogie influence "strange" yet boring. Patrik Forshage from Nöjesguiden believes that "Ska vi älska" is one of the worst tribute songs ever recorded. Håkan Steen calls the song a "crunch-boogie-attack" that is "music nerd pub rock". On the contrary, rock critic Per Bjurman notes that "Ska vi älska" is a gem in "an obscure" sub-genre of tribute songs dedicated to other artists that were recorded in the Swedish language. A&R man Kjell Andersson opinioned that "Ska vi älska" was the first song that exposed the wider Swedish public to the "pop culture reference-filled" writing of Per Gessle, even though "Flickorna på TV2" had partially done so before.

Nonetheless, "Ska vi älska, så ska vi älska till Buddy Holly" was long a mainstay on Gyllene Tider's live repertoire, being performed during almost every single one of their public performances post 1980. The song was included on the set lists of their reunion tours in 1996, 2004, 2013, 2019, and 2023, where it was performed in a medley together with "(Kom så ska vi) Leva livet" ("Come On, Let's) Live Life") and "(Dansar inte lika bra som) Sjömän". In live performances, Per Gessle and bassist Anders Herrlin play on each other's instruments during the song's guitar solo, a tradition that started during a television performance in 1980 together with Rick Wakeman and Björn Skifs. According to Mats "MP" Persson, this was a "panic idea" created from boasting over appearing on television with celebrities, with the band attempting to upstage the other guest performers. Due to good critical reception, it has been performed at most of the band's concerts since.

== Personnel ==
Personnel according to the liner notes of the 2007 re-issue of the album Gyllene Tider, unless otherwise noted.

- Per Gessle – vocals, guitar, lyrics, composition, mixing
- Mats "MP" Persson – electric guitar, acoustic guitar, backing vocals, composition, mixing
- Göran Fritzon – electric piano, Farfisa organ
- Anders Herrlin – fretless bass guitar
- Micke "Syd" Andersson – drums, backing vocals
- Lasse Lindbom – producer, mixing
- Björn Boström – engineer, mixing

== Charts ==
Weekly chart performance for "Ska vi älska, så ska vi älska till Buddy Holly"
Chart (1980)	Peak position
Sweden (Topplistan)	8
Sweden (Poporama)	1

== See also ==
- Buddy Holly in popular culture
