= Moderna Tider (album) =

Studio album by Gyllene Tider
- Released: 10 March 1981
- Recorded: 15 July, August – September 1980 & January 1981
- Studios: EMI, Stockholm
- Genres: Power pop; pop rock
- Length: 42:49
- Language: Swedish
- Label: Parlophone
- Producer: Lasse Lindbom

Gyllene Tider chronology
Gyllene Tider (1980)	Moderna Tider (1981)	Puls (1982)

Swing & Sweet! EP cover
- EP cover

Singles from Moderna Tider
- 1. "När vi två blir en" Released: 29 October 1980; 2. "(Kom så ska vi) Leva livet" Released: 29 April 1981

Moderna Tider (english: Modern Times) is the second studio album by Swedish pop group Gyllene Tider, released on 10 March 1981 through Parlophone. In 1980, Gyllene Tider became nationally famous, with their debut album and debut single reaching number one on the Topplistan chart. Shortly after this success, the production of a follow-up album was started, with vocalist Per Gessle presenting several songs to EMI A & R man Kjell Andersson, who rejected them for being too formulaic and imitative of their debut album. Recording sessions for the album started in July 1980 at EMI Studios in Skärmarbrink, Stockholm with producer Lasse Lindbom. The bulk of the album was recorded in August 1980, wrapping up in January 1981. By that point, the album had been pre-ordered in 140,000 copies in Sweden, an impressive number at the time.

Unlike the band's debut album, Moderna Tider is entirely self-composed, with the bulk of the material penned solely by Gessle, but features creative contributions from the entire band. The composition of the album was largely inspired by the pop rock and power pop by Elvis Costello and the Attractions along with the jangle poppy Tom Petty and the Heartbreakers, whilst the sound was inspired by the likes of Bruce Springsteen and Phil Spector. The album was named after the Charlie Chaplin movie Modern Times, following several rejected title ideas relating to male ejaculation. In conjunction with Moderna Tider, Gyllene Tider also recorded an extended play consisting of Swedish language-covers of the band's favorite British and American pop songs called Swing & Sweet!, which was issued with original copies of the album.

Largely fueled by Gyllene Tider's third single "När vi två blir en" ("When We Two Become One"), which became the band's biggest hit singles and a television appearance for Sweden's Television, Moderna Tider was extremely anticipated once it was released. It debuted at number one on the Swedish album chart, remaining on the top for three weeks. By the end of 1981 the album had sold over 400,000 copies in Sweden. Upon release, Moderna Tider received mainly positive reviews in the press, with most critics noting the more refined production compared to their debut album. It has since been re-issued on CD several times, occasionally with bonus tracks.

During the band's tour in support of the album, at a performance in Kristianopel, three people were killed during a stampede when attempting to enter the concert area.

== Background and recording ==
On 18 February 1980, Swedish pop band Gyllene Tider released their debut album Gyllene Tider through Parlophone Records. Fueled largely by the success of their number-one debut single "Flickorna på TV2" (1979) and supporting single "Ska vi älska, så ska vi älska till Buddy Holly" (1980), the album reached number one on the albums chart for one week in June 1980, propelling Gyllene Tider to national stardom. Amidst the band's first national tour, EMI Records A & R man Kjell Andersson contacted the band's lead vocalist Per Gessle regarding a follow-up album. Gessle responded by stating that he had solely written "Instant Hits"; a statement he had had spoken to Andersson in January 1979 prior to their recording contract. Following this, Gessle sent Andersson a demo tape containing songs intended for the follow-up album, the latter having high-expectations for the recordings. However, the recordings disappointed Andersson, as they "followed the same lyrical formula that had worked on previous albums", mostly regarding sexual intercourse. Andersson believed that these demos went overboard "to the point the band pariodied themselves.

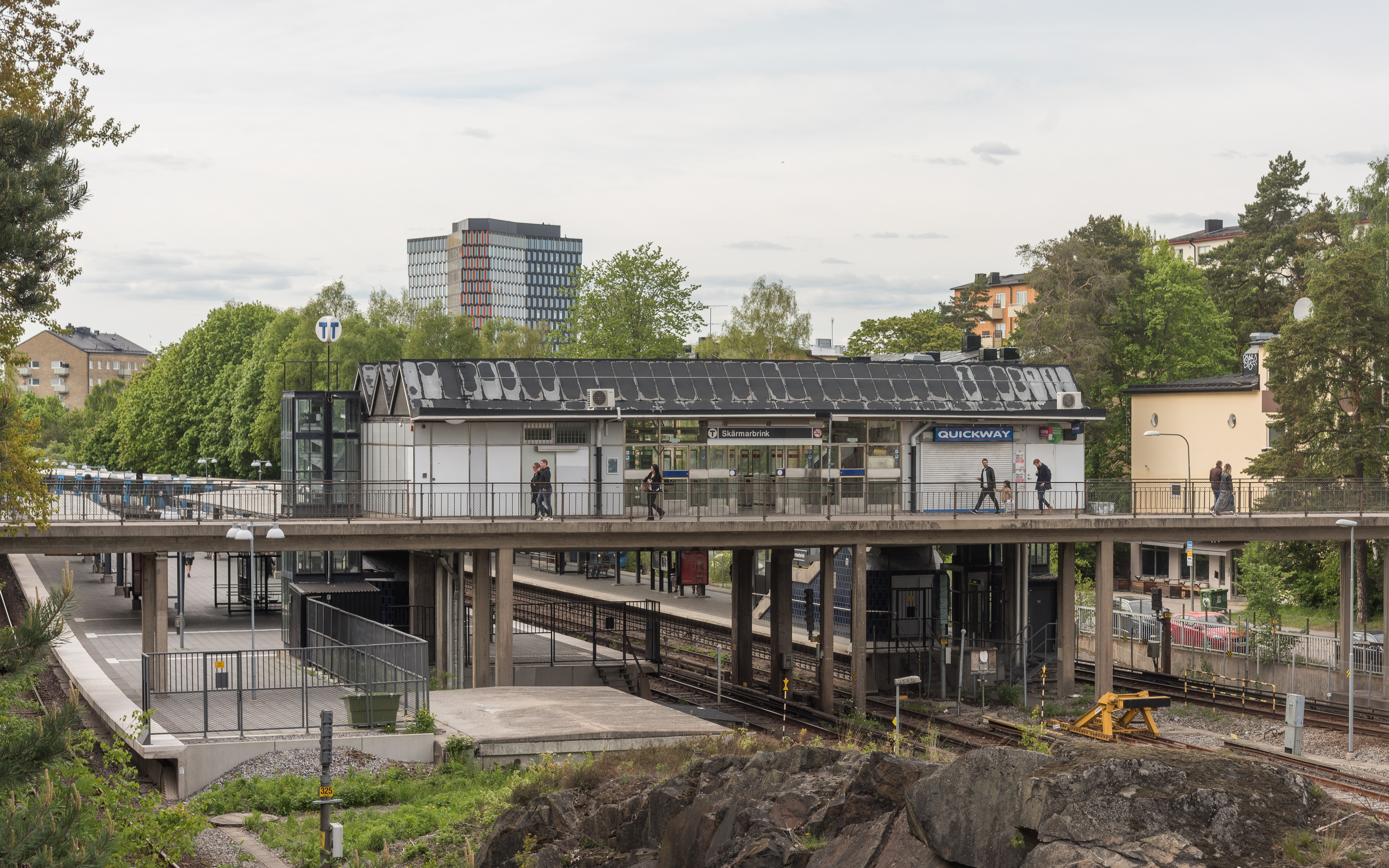
Moderna Tider was recorded at EMI's Studio (yellow building on the right) in Skärmarbrink, Stockholm.

Despite Andersson's opinions regarding the tracks, recording of the album commenced on 15 July 1980 at EMI's Studios in Skärmarbrink, Stockholm together with producer Lasse Lindbom, almost "a year after the band stepped into the studio to record their debut album". Unlike Gyllene Tider, which's sessions were held in EMI's studio 2, these sessions were held in studio 1 which was bigger, allowing for the band to achieve an ambience in drummer Micke "Syd" Andersson's drum kit. Initially, attempts were made to produce a suitable single in time for the Christmas market and by August of that year, Gyllene Tider had recorded six songs that they and Andersson agreed on: "Vänta på mej!" ("Wait for me!"), "Kärleken är inte blind (Men inte närsynt)" ("Love is Not Blind (But Rather Nearsighted)"), "När vi två blir en" ("When We Two Become One"), "(Kom så ska vi) Leva livet" ("(Come On, Let's) Live Life") and "Det hjärta som brinner" ("The Heart That is Burning"). Despite this, Andersson forced the band to discard the songs he rated lowly; they carried titles such as "Cilla, söt som socker" ("Cilla, Sweet as Sugar") and "Min tjej läser Playgirl" ("My Girl Reads Playgirl").

This put the band in a creative crisis, something that especially affected Gessle's self confidence, as he had composed most of the band's songs. According to Gessle, it was a "devilish hit, two months of work discarded when we're the biggest band in Sweden". In response, the band returns to their rehearsal space in Harplinge, where they start writing new songs for the upcoming album, which is when "Moderna Tider starts to take shape". According to Gessle, his and guitarist Mats "MP" Persson's writing required a "lot of sweat from the band". Recording of a few new songs commence in September, whilst Parlophone who were building up hype for the album, released "När vi två blir en" as the band's third single on 29 October 1980. (Note: Catalogue number Parlophone 7C 006-35797.) "När vi två blir en" became Gyllene Tider's biggest hit during the 1980s, holding the top spot on the singles chart for four months between December 1980 and March 1981, selling 80,000 copies by April 1981. As a direct result, demand for Gyllene Tider's second album increased, with their debut LP reaching the top-ten in the Swedish albums chart once more.

By the time the recording of the album wrapped up in January 1981, the band had additionally come up with the idea of issuing a covers-only bonus extended play accompanying the album; they were inspired by Rockpile's EP Nick Lowe & Dave Edmunds Sing The Everly Brothers, which had accompanied their 1980 album Seconds of Pleasure. Two songs recorded during the sessions for Moderna Tider were "För dina bruna ögons skull" ("For Your Brown Eyes Sake") and "Vem tycker om dig" ("Who Likes You"); however, the band felt that they were unfinished, so they were instead released on a fan club single in February 1982. During a meeting between the band and EMI executives during a dinner at Operakällaren, Stockholm, the Swedish CEO of EMI Rolf Nygren stood up and proclaimed that Moderna Tider had been pre-ordered in roughly 140,000 copies. According to Gessle, the band members had "expected 30,000 pre-orders" and realized the "scale of the band's popularity" for the first time at the time, describing it as a "strange" feeling. (Note: Author Sven Lindström compares Sweden's relatively small population with the population of the United States; adjusted for the larger US population, he estimated that the 140,000 pre-ordered copies of Moderna Tider in Sweden would equate to four million pre-ordered copies in the United States.)

== Content and songs ==
=== Overview ===
In contrast to Gyllene Tider (1980), where nine out of the ten songs were co-penned by Per Gessle with guitarist Mats "MP" Persson, Moderna Tider instead was largely exclusively written by Gessle, who received sole writing credit on eight of the album's 13 tracks. However, Persson is featured as a co-writer on most songs composed after Kjell Andersson's rejection in July 1980, and as such is credited as a co-writer on five tracks. Excluding the contents found on the Swing & Sweet EP, Moderna Tider is the first album by Gyllene Tider to be entirely self-composed and lack covers. Despite Gessle's songwriting dominance over the content, most of their bandmembers were included in the creative process; keyboardist Göran Fritzon, without credit, wrote the Farfisa organ intro and hook to the hit single "När vi två blir en". Singer-songwriter Niklas Strömstedt was also a large part of Moderna Tider's development, inspiring the band members with various phrases. Strömstedt thus sings backing vocals on several songs found on the album. The acoustics for the album were in large part derived from Bruce Springsteen's 1980 single "Hungry Heart" which is especially evident on Micke "Syd" Andersson's drum performance throughout the album. Inspired by Tom Petty, Gyllene Tider avoided using distortion on the guitar parts, instead opting for a "clean sound".

"The title was scrapped, even though the "Self Ejaculation" themed-photos were kept."

— Kjell Andersson (2021)

The album's title and album cover was additionally conceptualized and revised on several instances. Andersson rejected the initial title Varför vill ingen kyssa Ragnar? (Why Does Nobody Want to Kiss Ragnar?). The album cover where Gyllene Tider are depicted through a camera lens instead had origins in one of the discarded early titles for the album, Självutlösning, (Self Ejaculation) which is a Swedish language-pun regarding the fact that the words for camera shutters and ejaculation are the same. This idea was scrapped by the band themselves, as EMI would most likely ban it for the overtly sexual message. Instead, the band took the title Moderna Tider, which is the Swedish translation of the Charlie Chaplin Modern Times (1936). The band members took the back cover photos themselves at EMI Studios during the recording of the album, whilst Kjell Andersson was in charge of the graphic design.

The concept behind the Swing & Sweet EP was more straightforward. It solely contains four covers of both British and American pop groups, described by producer Hasse Huss as being the member's "four favorite songs", all of whom were translated with Swedish language-lyrics penned by Gessle. The EP opens with "Gyllene Tider för rock'n'roll", a cover of Mott the Hoople's 1974 single "The Golden Age of Rock 'n' Roll", which is where Gyllene Tider took their band name from. Additionally, "Jag vill ha ett svar" is more contemporary, being a cover of Tom Petty and the Heartbreakers' 1977 single "I Need to Know"; retrospectively Gessle allegedly received a telex from Petty's manager, who stated that Petty liked the Gyllene Tider recording of the song. Side two of the EP are dedicated to cover songs by the Beatles and the Beach Boys, whom the Gyllene Tider members were fans of during their childhood. In "Ge mej inte det där", a cover of Beach Boys "Girl Don't Tell Me" (1965), Gyllene Tider were especially influenced by the production of Phil Spector.

=== Side one ===
Moderna Tider opens with the song "Vänta på mej!" ("Wait For Me!"), which is an "Elvis Costello and the Attractions-esque song" that features a "start-stop" guitar rhythm, alongside feigned stuttering during the vocals. Lyrically, the song is about a man buying a train ticket "towards rock and roll", but accidentally purchases a ticket in the wrong direction, where everybody "was jamming jazz", to which the character gets allergies and dysentery. The lyrical content about buying a train ticket to a "mythical location" is comparable to Gyllene Tider's song "Himmel no. 7" ("Heaven Number Seven)", which had appeared on their debut album. "Tuff tuff tuff (Som ett lokomotiv)" ("Choo Choo Choo (Like a Locomotive)") is lyrically another pun in the Swedish language; "Tuff" meaning both "tough" and "choo" in the context of a steam locomotive, the double entendre being utilized as the narrator encourages another person to "toughen up like a locomotive". Musically, it heavily features Fritzon's brief fills on his farfisa organ.

"På jakt efter liv" ("On The Hunt for Life") heavily features twelve-string electric guitars and is a jangle pop inspired by Tom Petty and the Heartbreakers, in addition to featuring an arrangement where a piano and glockenspiel play the same melody during the song's opening and middle eight; the latter is also featured in the repetitive refrain. Lyrically, it refers to the narrator "fleeing from parties, aunts, matches and malt", stealing a car to drive "miles after miles" in search for life, ending in the narrator being overpowered by his friend Slentrian, who throws him to the floor; the narrator pulls a knife, leaving Slentrain's fate ambiguous. "När vi två blir en" ("When We two Become One") is undoubtedly the album's best known song, being a hit single released in anticipation of the album. According to Gessle, the song was written during the summer of 1980 during "a hot Greg Kihn / Rubinoos period". The song's distinctive Farfisa organ hook, which is repeated twice, was composed by Fritzon, whilst it retains the reggae rock-sound that the band had introduced on their debut single "Flickorna på TV2". Lyrically, "När vi två blir en" describes a teenager's desire and imagination to engage in sexual intercourse with his romantic interest, whilst he is unable to express this to her in real life.

"Det hjärta som brinner" ("The Heart Which Is Burning") was written in July 1980 and is Gessle's personal favorite song he wrote and recorded for Gyllene Tider. Once again, the song was inspired by Petty's power pop, which Gessle states is "wonderful to sing live". Lyrically, the song revolves the narrator urging his former romantic partner to "walk away from him", despite the fact her "heart is burning". "Du spelar svår att nå" ("You Play Hard to Get") relates to a woman who constantly rejects the narrator's gifts in his romantic pursuit of her, leading to him labelling her as "hard to get", despite both her mother and father rejecting his attempts to contact her. It is another power pop song inspired by both the Attractions and Petty. Side one's closing track, "Kom intill mej" ("Come Next to Me"), differs significantly by being a slow, gentle piano ballad, and is the album's first song of five to be co-written by Mats "MP" Persson. The song is lyrically about sexual intercourse "written from a romantic perspective", mentioning the bedroom's "peace".

=== Side two ===
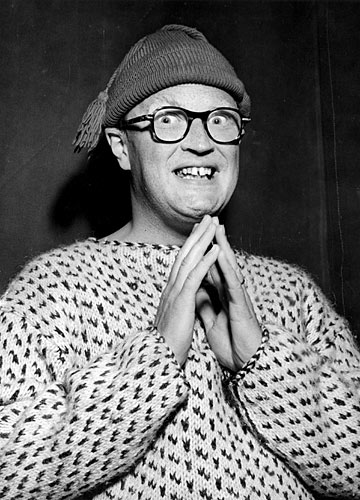
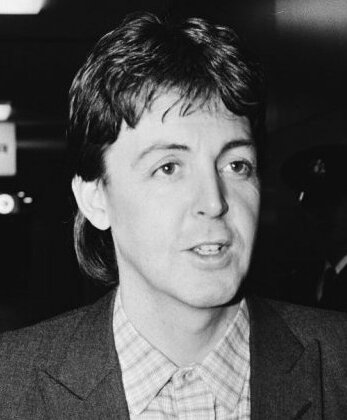
"Povel Ramel, Paul McCartney & jag" lyrically depics a conversation between Swedish entertainer Povel Ramel and the Beatles' member Paul McCartney from the perspective of Gessle.

Side two opens with another "hook-laden" song, the pop rock "(Kom så ska vi) Leva livet" ("(Come On, Let's) Live Life"). Gessle and Persson wrote the song on the former's 21st birthday on 12 January 1980, something which is referenced in the lyrics, as is a nod to Sweden's Television's test card. The song features Persson's guitar played through a Leslie speaker, which doubles with Fritzon's organ. "Leva livet" was released as Gyllene Tider's fourth single in April 1981, after the album's release. (Note: Catalogue number Parlophone 7C 006-35827.) "Min tjej och jag" ("My Girl and Me") is an oddity in Gyllene Tider's discography, as it features drummer Micke "Syd" Andersson singing lead vocals rather than Per Gessle. The song's opening mimics doo-wop music alongside male vocal falsettos referencing songs by Frankie Valli alongside Elton John's "Crocodile Rock" (1972). Lyrically, the song revolves around a man and his girlfriend being referred to as "criminals and bohemians" because the two of them have their "own language", and considers themselves to be "normal in their verbal epoch".

"Povel Ramel, Paul McCartney & Jag" ("Povel Ramel, Paul McCartney and Me") is one of the album's most contrasting songs lyrically, being a fictionally biographical account of a supposed dinner between Swedish entertainer Povel Ramel and British musician Paul McCartney which is observed by Gessle. McCartney's wife Linda McCartney and his children are mentioned in passing, as is Elton John and John Cleese in a word play. Gyllene Tider's producer Lasse Lindbom gets a tongue-in-cheek reference in the lyrics, as McCartney recognizes one of his songs on the radio. Musically, the song is boogie rock influenced by their earlier hit "Ska vi älska, så ska vi älska till Buddy Holly" (1980) alongside Status Quo. "Chrissie, hur mår du?" ("Chrissie, How Are You Feeling?") is another Petty-influenced jangle rock, musically reminiscent of to Gyllene Tider's early songs "Billy" (1978). song which is depicted from the perspective of somebody writing a postcard, with him contemplating to "write a book like Ulf Lundell".

The title of "Kärleken är inte blind (Men ganska närsynt)" ("Love Isn't Blind (But Rather Nearsighted") was coined by Niklas Strömstedt, who additionally provides backing vocals to the song. Gessle and Persson found the topic humorous enough to compose a song about. The song is a pop-rock "power pop anthem" which features "humorous lyrics" that make references to the French liqour Cointreau, and relates myopia with love, stating that it's "clumsy". The album's closing track "När alla vännerna gått hem" ("When All The Friends Have Gone Home") is a re-recording of the song which had originally appeared on Gyllene Tider's EP Gyllene Tider in 1978, which the band required permission from their former record label to record. The major difference distinguishing the two recordings from one another is the inclusion of an organ by Persson, whilst Fritzon performs the piano. Lyrically, the song laments the insecurities one may feel in the loneliness shortly after a social gathering. It ends on a repeated mantra that it "does not matter".

== Release and commercial performance ==
The release of Moderna Tider coincided with an appearance on Sweden's Television's show Måndagsbörsen on 3 March 1981, performing the three album tracks "När vi två blir en", "Det hjärta som brinner" alongside "När alla vännerna gått hem". The album would be released one week later on 10 March 1981 through EMI's sublabel Parlophone. (Note: Catalogue number Parlophone 7C 062-35825.) The album was accompanied by the Swing & Sweet extended play which came free in the album's sleeve at no extra price; (Note: Catalogue number Parlophone BEP 35825.) the LP carried the same retail price. Due to time constraints during the peak of the album's sales, employees at EMI's Swedish record pressing plant had difficulty inserting the Swing & Sweet EP into the Moderna Tider's album sleeve, and thus the practice was dropped after the first 150,000 copies of the album had been printed. Moderna Tider was also released on cassette; these copies did not come with the Sweet & Swing EP, however. (Note: Catalogue number Parlophone 7C 062-35824.)

"1981. I'm thinking about the hysteric, and I mean H–Y–S–T–E–R–I–C spring tour. People carried out like flies during the concerts, we ran street marathons and sat locked in boring Esso-motels because the entire lobby and restaurant was overcrowded with Gyllene Tider-fans. We won the Expressen (or was it Aftonbladet?) reader contest against Noice about the most popular band in Sweden."

— Per Gessle (2007)

Due to the high amount of pre-orders the album received, Moderna Tider would debut at number one on the Swedish albums chart on 27 March 1981, knocking Tender Turns Tuff by Mikael Rickfors off the top spot. It would hold the top spot of the chart for a further two weeks, before being knocked down to number two by Phil Collins' Face Value (1981) on 5 May. Nonetheless, Moderna Tider would remain in the top-ten until August 1981, and didn't fully drop out of the chart until November. In Norway, the album reached number two in June. By April, a month after the release of the album, it had sold 160,000 copies, and would eventually reach 390,000 sales by the end of the year, and eventually breach the 400,000 mark. This at the time would have been enough for Moderna Tider to be certified platinum in Sweden ten times over. Gessle mentioned that the success "did not even make sense", noting that the album had reached gold with its pre-orders.

In conjunction with the release of Moderna Tider, Gyllene Tider embarked on a nationwide tour that would eventually go on to last six months in order to promote the album, starting with a performance at the folkpark in Hedemora on 13 March. It was the band's second nationwide tour. On Valborg Eve (30 April 1981) that year, the band were scheduled to perform at the Masten stage in the small town of Kristianopel, Karlskrona. Although the band had expected 1,500 fans, 6,000 showed up. The bad weather conditions contributed to most fans waiting in their vehicles until the gates opened. The sudden influx of people at the gate caused one of the worst stampedes in Swedish history. Gunnar Apell (29), Jan-Eric Gotthardsson (20) and Eva Karlsson (18), all from Kalmar County, died from their injuries sustained in the crush. According to Gessle the incident was "incredibly tragic", stating that the trip back to Halmstad was "slow", with "some [band members] crying in the tour bus. Initially, the band wanted to cancel the remainder of the tour in honor of the dead; compromising with EMI, only the following three dates in Halmstad, Trollhättan and Vänersborg were cancelled.

== Critical reception and legacy ==
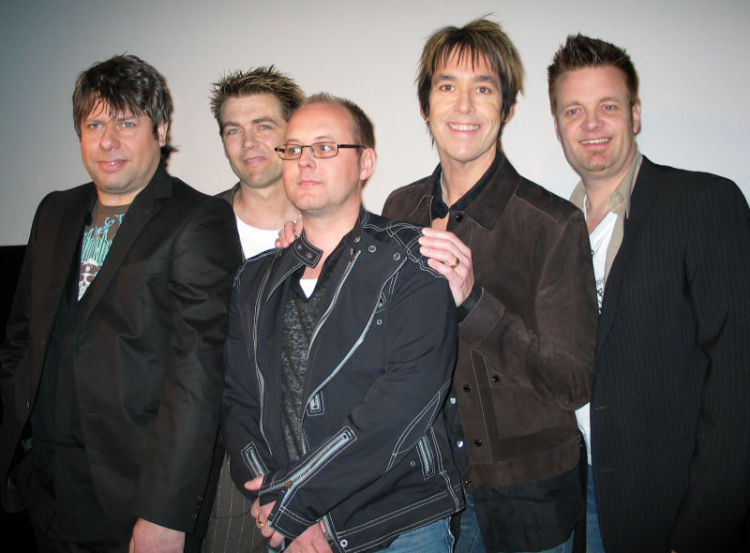
Moderna Tider is Gyllene Tider's best selling studio album.

Upon release in 1981, Moderna Tider received primarily good reviews in the Swedish press. In Aftonbladet, the album received praise as "an approved disc" by the staff reviewer, who noted that the "correctly arranged album" would reach out to a wider audience than Gyllene Tider's debut album. Despite this, they find that Moderna Tider lacked the "tougher sound" they looked for, but wrote that the Swing & Sweet EP was a "great incentive" that added buyer's value to the album. Svenska Dagbladet wrote that the album was "long-sought" follow-up to their debut album. They wrote that it was a worthy successor that was "a bit more experimental" in nature, citing the bizarre "Povel Ramel, Paul McCartney & jag" as the most obvious example of this. They also noted "(Kom så ska vi) Leva livet" and "När alla vännerna har gått hem" as the album's clear highlights, but found a few songs on the Swing & Sweet EP overtly self-conscious. In Dagens Nyheter, the reviewer stated that Moderna Tider featured several parodies of "60s pop music clichés", and also wrote that Gessle's vocal performance was "cute". They believed that "När vi två blir en" would increase appeal for the album, due to how big of a hit it was. They also praised Lindbom's production and named it influenced by Tom Petty.

On 29 April 1981, "(Kom så ska vi) Leva livet" was extracted and released as a single by Parlophone, backed by "Leka med elden" ("Play With Fire"), an outtake from the album sessions. (Note: Catalogue number Parlophone 7C 006-35827.) The single became somewhat of a chart failure, peaking at number 13 for the sole week it appeared on the Swedish Topplistan chart. However, the failure of the single was attributed to the success of the album it was attached to, as it "sold in hoardes", thus reducing commercial appeal for a single that appeared on an album that "most fans" owned. With the exception of the compilation album Halmstads pärlor (1995), Moderna Tider is Gyllene Tider's most well known and best selling album and additionally became the basis for the name of a Gyllene Tider tribute act. In 2013, Sonic magazine ranked Moderna Tider as the 84th best Swedish album of all time. It is additionally one of the titles mentioned in the critically acclaimed cult classic book 1000 svenska klassiker (1000 Swedish Classics). However, Gessle also attributes Moderna Tider with making the members tired of "recording and touring", to which they went on vacation to the United States and "pretended to be pop-stars there" instead.

Moderna Tider has been re-issued on multiple occasions after the original 1981 release. In 1990, it received a release on compact disc for the first time. (Note: Catalogue number Parlophone 7942202.) On this release, it carried the original album, plus bonus tracks that included the entirety of the Swing & Sweet EP, the single "Ljudet av ett annat hjärta" ("The Sound of Another Heart"), the B-side "Teena" alongside the fan club single "För dina bruna ögons skull" ("For Your Brown Eyes Sake") and "Vem tycker om dig" ("Who Likes You") plus the non-album B-side "Leka med elden". The same bonus tracks were present when the album received another CD re-issue in 2004. (Note: Catalogue number Parlophone 7243 5 76776 2 2.) However, a re-issue released in 2007 included solely the 13 original album tracks. (Note: Catalogue number Parlophone 0946 3 63079 2 3.) In 2019, the album was re-issued on vinyl for the first time by Cosmos Music. To celebrate the album's 40th anniversary in 2021, a 3-LP box set was released with the original album, bonus content and unreleased tracks.

== Track listing ==
=== Moderna Tider ===
All lyrics are written by Per Gessle; all music is composed by Per Gessle, unless noted.

Side One
No.	Title	Music	English Title	Length
1.	"Vänta på mej!"		"Wait For Me!"	2:52
2.	"Tuff tuff tuff (Som ett lokomotiv)"		"Choo Choo Choo (Like A Locomotive)"	2:59
3.	"På jakt efter liv"		"On The Hunt For Life"	3:20
4.	"När vi två blir en"		"When We Two Become One"	3:05
5.	"Det hjärta som brinner"		"The Heart Which Is Burning"	3:00
6.	"Du spelar svår att nå"		"You Play Hard To Get"	2:42
7.	"Kom intill mej"	Per Gessle; Mats Persson	"Come Next To Me"	3:28
Total length:				21:26

Side Two
No.	Title	Music	English Title	Length
1.	"(Kom så ska vi) Leva livet"	Gessle; Persson	"(Come On, Let's) Live Life"	3:41
2.	"Min tjej och jag"		"My Girl and I"	3:24
3.	"Povel Ramel, Paul McCartney & jag"	Gessle; Persson	"Povel Ramel, Paul McCartney and Me"	3:10
4.	"Chrissie, hur mår du?"	Gessle; Persson	"Chrissie, How Are You Feeling?"	3:31
5.	"Kärleken är inte blind (Men ganska närsynt)"	Gessle; Persson	"Love Is Not Blind (But Rather Nearsighted)"	3:47
6.	"När alla vännerna gått hem"		"When All The Friends Have Gone Home"	3:50
Total length:				21:23

=== Swing & Sweet! ===
All lyrics are written by Per Gessle.

Side One
No.	Title	Music	Original Artist	Length
1.	"Gyllene Tider för rock'n'roll" ("The Golden Age of Rock 'n' Roll")	Ian Hunter	Mott the Hoople	2:59
2.	"Vill ha ett svar" ("I Need to Know")	Tom Petty	Tom Petty and the Heartbreakers	2:59
Total length:				5:58

Side Two
No.	Title	Music	Original Artist	Length
1.	"Och jorden den är rund" ("And Your Bird Can Sing")	Lennon–McCartney	The Beatles	1:57
2.	"Ge mej inte det där" ("Girl Don't Tell Me")	Brian Wilson	The Beach Boys	2:20
Total length:				4:17

== Personnel ==
Personnel adapted from the liner notes of Soldans på din grammofon, unless otherwise noted.

- Per Gessle – lead vocals, acoustic guitar, electric guitar,
- Mats "MP" Persson – acoustic guitar, electric guitar, keyboards
- Anders Herrlin – electric bass
- Göran Fritzon – piano, electric piano, Farfisa organ, hammond organ
- Micke "Syd" Andersson – drums, percussion, backing vocals, lead vocals ("Min tjej och jag")

== Sources ==
- Andersson, Kjell (2007). Gyllene Tider [Golden Times] (CD) (in Swedish). Sweden: Parlophone. 0946 3 63078 2 4.
- Andersson, Kjell (2013). Soldans på din grammofon – 24 hits [Sun Dance on Your Grammophone – 24 Hits] (CD) (in Swedish). Sweden: Parlophone. 9190862.
- Andersson, Kjell (2021). Ingen går hel ur det här: mitt liv i den svenska musiken [No One Gets Out Of This Whole: My Life in Swedish Music] (in Swedish) (1st ed.). Sweden: Bonnier. ISBN 978-910-0181-567.
- Gessle, Per (1989). Instant Hits, 1979-1989 (CD) (in Swedish). Sweden: Parlophone. 7930172.
- Gessle, Per (2007). Moderna Tider [Modern Times] (CD) (in Swedish). Sweden: Parlophone. 0946 3 63079 2 3.
- Gradvall, Jan; Nordström, Björn; Nordström, Ulf; Rabe, Annina (2009). Tusen svenska klassiker [1000 Swedish Classics] (in Swedish) (1st ed.). Sweden: Norstedts. ISBN 978-91-1-301717-4.
- Huss, Hasse (1990). Moderna Tider [Modern Times] (CD) (in Swedish). Sweden: Parlophone. 7942202.
- Lindström, Sven (2013). Roxette: den osannolika resan tur och retur [Roxette: The Unlikely Journey Round Trip] (in Swedish) (1st ed.). Sweden: Nordstedts. ISBN 978-91-130-541-00.
- Wikström, Jan-Owe (1997). Gyllene Tider [Golden Times] (in Swedish) (1st ed.). Sweden: Bonnier Alba. ISBN 978-9134-519-091.
- Wikström, Jan-Owe (2013). Alla tiders Gyllene Tider: en roadmovie-biografi [The Golden Times of All Time: A Roadmovie-Biography] (in Swedish) (1st ed.). Sweden: Roos & Tegnér. ISBN 97-89-186-691-608.
- Wikström, Jan-Owe; Roos, Anders (2019). Gyllene Tider: en sista refräng [Golden Times: One Last Refrain] (in Swedish) (1st ed.). Sweden: EN Roos Böcker. ISBN 978-919-8447-767.
