= Halmstads pärlor =

Halmstads pärlor - Samtliga hits! 1979-95

Compilation album by Gyllene Tider
- Released: 15 May 1995
- Recorded: 1979–1995
- Genre: Pop

Gyllene Tider chronology
Samlade Tider (1994)	Halmstads pärlor - Samtliga hits! 1979-95 (1995)	Ljudet av ett annat hjärta/En samling (1997)

Halmstads pärlor - Samtliga hits! 1979-95 is a compilation album from Swedish pop group Gyllene Tider, released on 15 May 1995. The album was re-released in 1996, then with Gyllene Tider EP as bonus record.

In Sweden the album peaked at number one on the Swedish Albums Chart, staying in the charts for almost two years, and went on to be certified 5× Platinum. The album also entered the Top 10 of the Norwegian Albums Chart, peaking at number two.

== Track listing ==
=== CD1 ===
1. Det är över nu [3.47]
2. Sommartider [3.18]
3. Flickorna på TV2 [3.50]
4. Ska vi älska, så ska vi älska till Buddy Holly [3.44]
5. (Dansar inte lika bra som) Sjömän [2.32]
6. Billy [5.20]
7. Marie i växeln [3.42]
8. När vi två blir en [3.05]
9. Kärleken är inte blind (Men ganska närsynt) [3.47]
10. (Kom så ska vi) Leva livet [3.41]
11. Det hjärta som brinner [3.00]
12. Ljudet av ett annat hjärta [3.50]
13. Tylö Sun [2.41]
14. (Hon vill ha) Puls [3.20]
15. Flickan i en Cole Porter-sång [3.48]
16. Vandrar i ett sommarregn [4.41]
17. Du är en gangster, älskling! [3.30]
18. Teaser Japanese [3.28]
19. Det är blommor som har fångat dej [5.10]
20. Kung av sand [4.40]
21. När alla vännerna gått hem [3.50]

=== CD2 ===
1. Gå & fiska! [3.56]
2. Juni, juli, augusti [3.52]
3. Harplinge [3.44]
4. Faller ner på knä [3.38]

== Certifications ==
Region	Certification	Certified units/sales
Sweden (GLF)	5× Platinum	500,000^{^}
^{^} Shipments figures based on certification alone.
