= Instant Hits! =

Compilation album by Gyllene Tider
- Released: 5 September 1989
- Recorded: 1979–1989
- Genre: Pop

Gyllene Tider chronology
The Heartland Café (1984)	Instant Hits! (1989)	Parkliv! (1990)

Instant Hits!, longer title Instant Hits! – Samtliga hits 1979–1989 is a compilation album from pop group Gyllene Tider, released on 5 September 1989. Tracks 18–23 are recorded by Pers garage, which is Gyllene Tider without Anders Herrlin. It reached number three on the Swedish Albums Chart.

== Track listing ==
1. "Flickorna på TV2"
2. "Ska vi älska, så ska vi älska till Buddy Holly"
3. "(Dansar inte lika bra som) Sjömän"
4. "Billy"
5. "Marie i växeln"
6. "När vi två blir en"
7. "(Kom så ska vi) Leva livet"
8. "Det hjärta som brinner"
9. "Ljudet av ett annat hjärta"
10. "Tylö Sun"
11. "Sommartider"
12. "När alla vännerna gått hem"
13. "(Hon vill ha) Puls"
14. "Vandrar i ett sommarregn"
15. "Flickan i en Cole Porter-sång"
16. "Teaser Japanese"
17. "Break Another Heart"
18. "Småstad" *
19. "Om hon visste vad hon ville" *
20. "Ny pojkvän" *
21. "Oh yea oh yea (Oh oh)" *
22. "Vandrande man" *
23. "Jo-Anna farväl" *

== Charts ==
Chart (1989)	Peak position
Swedish Albums (Sverigetopplistan)	3
