= Konstpaus =

Compilation album by Gyllene Tider
- Released: 17 July 2000
- Recorded: 1989–2000
- Genre: Pop

Gyllene Tider chronology
Återtåget Live! (1997)	Konstpaus (2000)	GT 25 - Samtliga hits! (2004)

Konstpaus - samtliga inspelningar från 90-talet och lite till... is a compilation album from Swedish pop group Gyllene Tider, released on 17 July 2000.

== Track listing ==
1. "Småstad" - 3:33
2. "Gå & fiska!" - 3:58
3. "Det är över nu" - 3:47
4. "Kung av sand" - 4:39
5. "Juni, juli, augusti" - 3:54
6. "Jo-Anna farväl" - 2:09
7. "Om hon visste vad hon ville" - 3:26
8. "Vandrande man" - 3:14
9. "Det är blommor som har fångat dig" - 4:52
10. "Faller ner på knä" - 3:39
11. "Ny pojkvän" - 2:03
12. "Oh Yeah Oh Yeah (Oh Oh)" - 2:22
13. "Harplinge" - 3:46
14. "Ingen går i ringen" - 2:29
15. "Solens vän" - 4:04

== Charts ==
Chart (2000)	Peak position
Swedish Album Chart	10
