= Återtåget =

Återtåget may refer to:

- 1996 July-August tour in Sweden by Swedish pop group Gyllene Tider
- Återtåget Live!, 1997 album from Swedish pop group Gyllene Tider
