= Samlade Tider =

Compilation album by Gyllene Tider
- Released: April 20, 1994
- Recorded: 1979–1982
- Genre: Pop

Gyllene Tider chronology
Parkliv! (1990)	Samlade Tider (1994)	Halmstads pärlor (1995)

Samlade Tider is a compilation album from pop group Gyllene Tider, released on April 20, 1994.

== Track listing ==
1. Himmel No. 7
2. Revolver upp
3. Ska vi älska, så ska vi älska till Buddy Holly
4. På jakt efter liv
5. Ljudet av ett annat hjärta
6. Leka med elden
7. (Kom så ska vi) Leva livet
8. Vän till en vän
9. Vandrar i ett sommarregn
10. Tylö Sun
11. Povel Ramel, Paul McCartney och jag
12. Lova att du aldrig glömmer bort mej
