= Moderna tider =

Moderna tider may refer to:

- Moderna tider, Swedish language title for the 1936 film Modern Times
- Moderna tider (magazine), a Swedish magazine founded in 1990 by Göran Rosenberg
- Moderna Tider (album), a 1981 album by Swedish pop group Gyllene Tider
- Moderna tider (television program), a Swedish TV program on TV3
