= Flickorna på TV2 =

- Swedish single sleeve

Single by Gyllene Tider

from the album Gyllene Tider
- Language: Swedish
- English title: "The Girls on Channel Two"
- A-side: "Himmel no. 7" (double A-side)
- Written: 6 May 1979
- Released: 10 December 1979
- Recorded: 13 August 1979
- Studio: EMI, Stockholm
- Genre: New wave; power pop; reggae; reggae rock
- Length: 3:50
- Label: Parlophone
- Songwriters: Per Gessle; Mats Persson
- Producer: Lasse Lindbom

Gyllene Tider singles chronology
| "Himmel no. 7" / "Flickorna på TV2" (1979) | "Ska vi älska, så ska vi älska till Buddy Holly" / "(Dansar inte lika bra som) Sjömän" (1980) |

Audio
- "Flickorna på TV2" on YouTube

"Flickorna på TV2" ("The Girls on Channel Two") is a song by Swedish pop group Gyllene Tider, written by their vocalist Per Gessle and guitarist Mats "MP" Persson. It originated in a song named "Farlig terräng" ("Dangerous Terrain") and was inspired by Elvis Costello and the Attractions single "Watching the Detectives" (1977). Gessle re-wrote the lyrics after hearing a revue by Hasse Alfredsson which included a sexual joke about a television set; Gessle related this to the attractive female television presenters who appeared on Sweden's Television's channel SVT2 (then TV2). The song was recorded in August 1979 at EMI's studio in Stockholm.

Musically, "Flickorna på TV2" is a reggae rock song with elements of Gyllene Tider's usual power pop and new wave sound which features a "danceable beat" and a 40-second-long improvised guitar solo by Persson. Lyrically, the song is sexually explicit, revolving around a man getting gradually more sexually aroused as he watches the presenters on television, culminating in a wish to engage in sexual intercourse with them.

Originally, "Flickorna på TV2" was issued as the B-side of the single "Himmel no. 7" ("Heaven Number Seven"), released through Parlophone on 10 December 1979 following a compromise between the band and EMI. However, as DJs and discotheques began playing "Flickorna" on rotation, the single was re-released as a double A-side. The single charted because of several media appearances, reaching number one on the Topplistan chart in February 1980, propelling the band and Gessle to stardom. The single received positive reviews, with many noting the genre and lyrics. The lyrical content briefly generated controversy in the mass media.

== Writing and recording ==
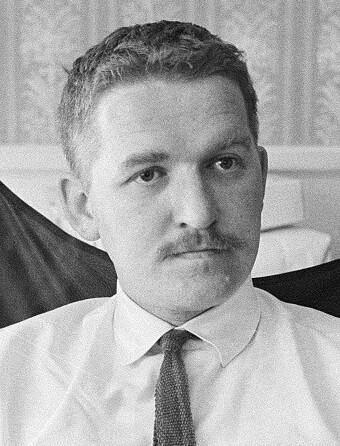
Comedian Hasse Alfredson partially inspired the lyrics of "Flickorna på TV2".

Gyllene Tider vocalist Per Gessle and guitarist Mats "MP" Persson co-wrote "Flickorna på TV2" on 6 May 1979 at Gessle's home in Halmstad. Gessle attributes the song primarily to Persson, stating that it is a "typical MP-song" that was "way too intelligent to have been written by me [Gessle]". Initially, the song carried completely different lyrics written by Gessle and held another title, "Farlig terräng" ("Dangerous Terrain"), with the composition being inspired by the Elvis Costello and the Attractions song "Watching the Detectives" (1977). Neither Gessle nor Persson were particularly proud of the song, which had been conceived during a hectic songwriting marathon that had its origins in a phone call received by Gessle from EMI Records A & R man Kjell Andersson on 23 January 1979; EMI had expressed interest in Gyllene Tider's eponymous yellow EP (1978), to which Gessle had falsely claimed that the band had several compositions ready.

A 1974 revue by comedic double act Hasse & Tage led to the lyrics of the song being re-written at a later date. The revue, named Glaset i örat (The Glass In The Ear), featured a song by Hasse Alfredson called "Hon och jag" ("Her and Me"), which featured the comedic dirty line "Det enda jag får sätta på är teveapparaten" ("The only thing I get to turn on is the television set"). The dirty pun appealed to Gessle, who sought to write an equally dirty song about celebrities on television featuring similar puns. The lyrics of "Flickorna på TV2" were partially inspired by the television presenters who commonly figured on Sweden's Television's Channel Two (nowadays SVT2), as the television set in Gyllene Tider's rehearsal space was tuned to that channel. The women included Inger Egler, Ing-Margret Lackne, Gunilla Linder, Ing-Marie Montero and in particular presenter Lotta Magnusson (mother of comedian Peter Magnusson), who was later revealed to be the primary subject in the song.

"Flickorna På TV2" was initially recorded as a demo that was the eleventh track of a cassette tape that Gessle mailed to EMI in Stockholm. On the cassette label, he wrote that he regarded the song as a bonus track merely intended to showcase the productivity of him and Persson, as "Flickorna" greatly contrasted in sound and style of their other music. However, it was due to EMI's in-house record producer Lasse Lindbom's enthusiastic response to the song that they decided to record it during the sessions for their eponymous debut album in August 1979. "Flickorna" was recorded during Gyllene Tider's second week at EMI's studio 2 in Skärmarbrink and was put to tape on 13 August 1979. At the time the studio used a 16-track recorder, which the band used to their advantage by utilizing it for several overdubs. Lindbom produced the sessions, in addition to mixing the song together with Gessle, Persson and Björn Boström.

== Composition and lyrics ==
As recorded by Gyllene Tider, "Flickorna på TV2" is a song written in C major that has 87 beats per minute. It opens up with a drum roll by Micke "Syd" Andersson. Although it adheres to the band's new wave style which features distinct power pop influences, it deviates from most other material that would appear on their debut album by featuring a distinctive reggae rhythm. As such, Andersson's drumming pattern features a one drop rhythm that prevails across almost the entire song. Author Jan-Olof Wikström calls "Flickorna" an "old reggae-sketch" but also a genuine representative of reggae rock, in part due to Costello's influence but also due to it being "danceable". "Flickorna" is characterized by its distinctive repetitive rhythm guitar strum pattern, which occurs only every other beat. Most of the song's chord progressions occurs at the tail end of every verse, which is followed by a brief, fast chain modulation in the form of a circle progression in between every other verse.

Musically, "Flickorna På TV2" features an uninterrupted, 40-second-long guitar solo overdubbed at the end of the second chorus that was entirely improvised and shredded by Mats "MP" Persson. In addition to singing the song, Per Gessle contributes by playing tremolo rhythm guitar, which provides a counter-melody at the end of the guitar strum patterns during the instrumental sections of the song. Göran Fritzon contributes both electric piano and a Farfisa combo organ to the song. However, the electric piano contributions are largely buried in the mix, whereas his organ parts provide nothing more than the basic rhythm, primarily only playing chords across the song, with brief exceptions during the chain modulations. Due the band's youthful willingness to experiment, Andersson additionally overdubbed timbales and cabasa onto the backing track in addition to his regular drum set.

Lyrically, "Flickorna På TV2" features four written verses and two written choruses alongside a written outro, all of which are separated by instrumental breaks. The lyrics tell the story of a young man, who, after being exhausted from work and the city, decides to turn on Channel Two on the TV, eagerly longing to see the presenters after the weather forecasting and sports reports. Popular Swedish news program Rapport is mentioned by name during the song. During the choruses, the protagonist declares that the TV presenters on Channel Two are "what makes the world go around", as he gets increasingly sexually aroused with every verse. He claims to get willingly seduced, before "snorting like a bull" and claiming that the presenters have turned him to an animal. The outro lyrics are made up of a word play that solely works in the Swedish language; the protagonist wants to imagine turning on Channel Two but intersperses this with imagining having sexual intercourse with the TV presenters at the same time.

== Release and commercial performance ==
Prior to the release of "Flickorna på TV2", Gyllene Tider had a clash with their record label EMI over a suitable debut single. Gyllene Tider were persistent that "Flickorna" would be issued as the single, while EMI, reluctant over the song's lyrical content and reggae style, were unconvinced over its commerciality. Eventually, a compromise was reached; a single would be pressed carrying "Himmel no. 7" ("Heaven Number Seven") on the A-side, whilst "Flickorna" would be relegated to the B-side. On 10 December 1979, the recently re-activated EMI sublabel Parlophone released "Himmel no. 7" with "Flickorna" on the B-side as a 7-inch 45rpm single; this first issue was pressed on yellow vinyl. (Note: Catalogue number Parlophone 7C 006-35708.) However, almost immediately upon release, it became abundantly clear that "Flickorna" was the preferred side; national radio stations and discotheques both played "Flickorna" on regular rotation. Therefore, on 17 December, new issues of the single were released on black vinyl promoting "Flickorna" as the A-side. Due to a mis-print on the vinyl label, the single was accidentally promoted as a double A-side, something that was never corrected.

"Thank [Lasse] Lindbom and [Ingemar] Dunker for making it danceable. Otherwise I would've still been weighing champignons at Fammarp's Garden."

— Per Gessle regarding the success of "Flickorna på TV2".

Despite receiving airplay on the radio, it took "Flickorna på TV2" a while to chart on the national chart Topplistan. This was partly due to the Christmas season but also because of the single's sexual lyrical content causing some DJs to refuse to play it and some record shops to refuse to stock the single. It took until their television debut on Måndagsbörsen, alongside a promotional stunt where Gyllene Tider and their friends and relatives sent in 300 postcards to radio show Poporama requesting a re-play of the single, that it began taking on. It entered the chart on 25 January 1980, at number 17, before peaking at number one on 22 February, staying there for two weeks. It dropped out of the chart on 27 June 1980 at a position of 17, by which point it had spent 12 consecutive weeks on the chart. On Poporama's chart it reached number two (behind "Another Brick in the Wall" by Pink Floyd) before being disqualified because of the postcard stunt. In total, "Flickorna" sold over 25,000 copies by July 1980, enough for it to be certified platinum in Sweden at the time.

"Flickorna på TV2" was included on Gyllene Tider's eponymous debut album, which was released on 18 February 1980 through Parlophone. (Note: Catalogue number Parlophone 7C 062-35709.) On the album, it was sequenced as the fourth track, in between "Revolver upp" ("Revolver up") and "(Dansar inte lika bra som) Sjömän" ("(Don't Dance as Well as) Sailors"). On the album version, a brief interlude was included. The song gets interrupted 5 seconds in, before a male voice reads "Master, 17223, take eight". Following this, the track starts anew. Often confused with being an error left into the track, Gessle explained that it was a recording of an audio engineer Gyllene Tider found during their time at EMI's studio and thought was cool enough to include on the album. Since then, "Flickorna" has been included on most compilation albums by the band, including Instant Hits! (1989), (Note: Catalogue number Parlophone 7930171.) Halmstads pärlor (1995), (Note: Catalogue number Parlophone 4751492.) GT 25 – Samtliga hits! (2004), (Note: Catalogue number Parlophone 7243 5 76959 2 3.) and Soldans på din grammofon (2013). (Note: Catalogue number Parlophone 50999 019086 2 6.) To commemorate the single's 10-year anniversary, band bassist Anders Herrlin created a remix of the song, which was released as "Flickorna på TV2 (Remix ’89)" on 5 September 1989, with the original versions of "Flickorna" and "Himmel no. 7" as the B-sides. (Note: Catalogue number Parlophone 1357086.)

== Critical reception and legacy ==
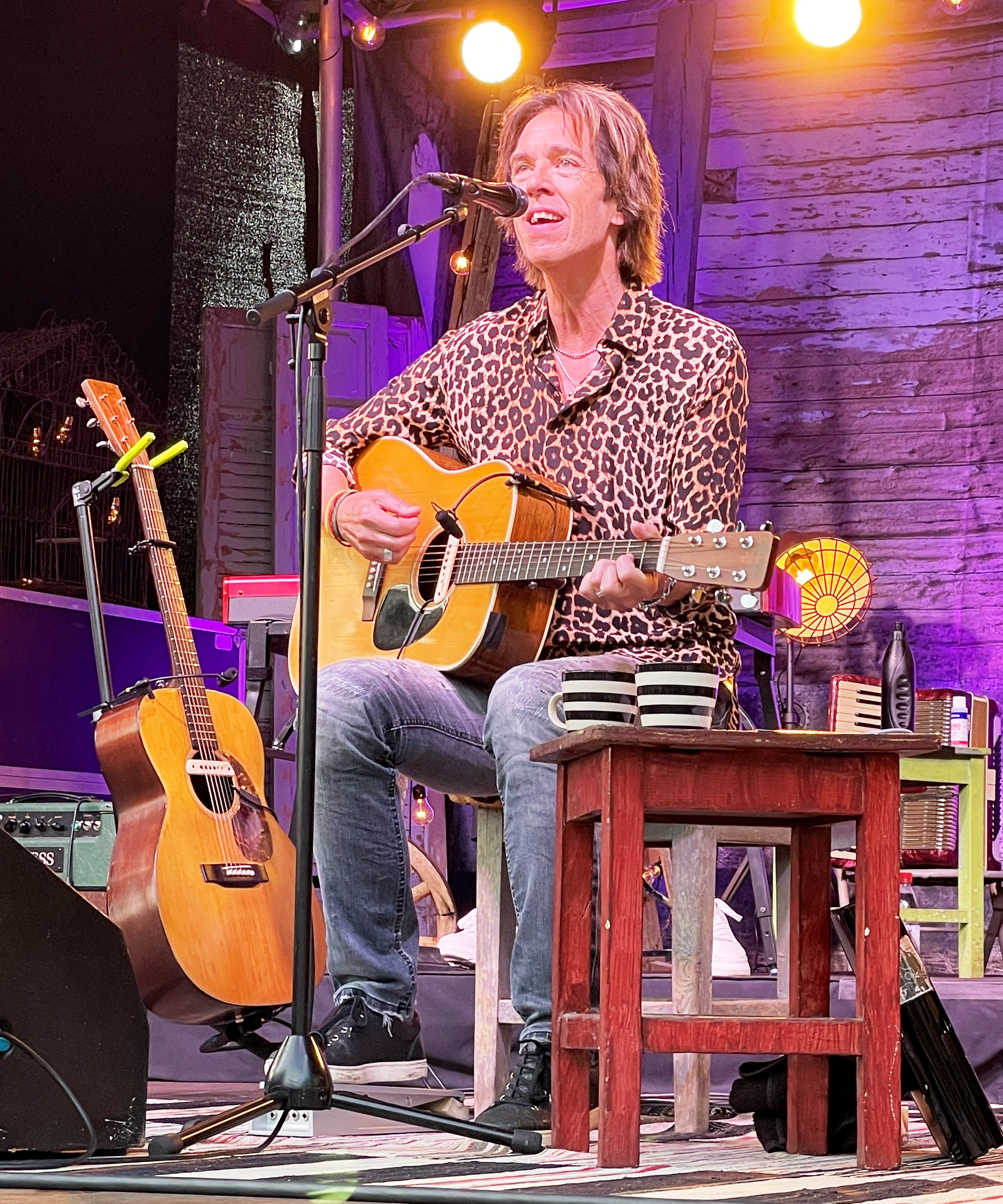
"Flickorna på TV2" kick-started Gyllene Tider and Per Gessle's (pictured in 2021) careers.

Upon original release, "Flickorna på TV2" received mostly positive reviews in the press. In Aftonbladet, it was described as a "charmy reggae-influenced" song with a "great guitar-solo", with the staff reviewer preferring it to "Himmel no. 7". They write that the lyrics are both gimmicky and potentially controversial "with the older generation". GT named "Flickorna" as "one of the best releases of 1979" by a Swedish band and noted the originality of recording a reggae song in the Swedish language. They particularly praised Herrlin's bass playing, stating that it "drives the entire record along". The lyrics were however criticized for their explicit vulgarity, believed to sound like the work of a "horomonal teenager". Newspaper Expressen believed the single to be a "great two-sider" but thought "Himmel no. 7" had a slight edge over "Flickorna" because of its more conventional pop rock style. The lyrics of "Flickorna" were however praised as "raunchy" and creative, especially with the word play during the outro. Dagens Nyheter gave praise to Andersson's drum performance and Persson's guitar solo but found the reggae-styled song strange in general, particularly highlighting the lyrics for their vulgarity.

"Flickorna på TV2" caused minor controversy upon its release because of the sexually explicit lyrics, something journalist Harry Amster stated "caused the entirety of Folkhemmet to start shivering". The reviewer from Dagens Nyheter wrote that several people boycotted Sweden's Radio due to them playing "Flickorna" on a regular basis. A brief debate started in the mass media whether or not it was morally correct to subject children to such content on radio. Most of the record shops that boycotted the single eventually relented and started selling it once it was clear it would be a hit, but some continuously refused to keep it in stock "to send a message". However, according to Wikström, most of the controversy was "overblown" by EMI, who solely were worried about "Flickorna"'s commercial appeal but held no personal objections to the song's lyrical content. In addition, it was people's curiosity about the taboo, namely sexuality, that partially caused "Flickorna" to become a hit.

When it became clear that "Flickorna På TV2" and the Gyllene Tider album had become commercial successes, Gyllene Tider celebrated at the Atlantic club in Stockholm. The band would eventually go on to become one of Sweden's most commercially successful pop bands during the early 1980s, with further successful top-ten singles in "Ska vi älska, så ska vi älska till Buddy Holly" ("If We're Making Love, We're Making Love to Buddy Holly"), "När vi två blir en" ("When We Two Become One") (both 1980), "Ljudet av ett annat hjärta" ("The Sound of Another Heart") (1981) and "Sommartider" ("Summertimes") (1982). However, their success was entirely dependent on the success of "Flickorna", which would later be described as a "make or break it single". The commercial success of the single was a massive "boost in encouragement" for lead vocalist Gessle, who would continue writing music, culminating in Roxette, who achieved four Billboard Hot 100 number-one singles penned by him.

== Personnel ==
Personnel according to the liner notes of the 2007 re-issue of the album Gyllene Tider.

- Per Gessle – lead vocals, tremolo guitar
- Mats "MP" Persson – electric guitar, backing vocals
- Göran Fritzon – organ, electric piano
- Anders Herrlin – bass guitar
- Micke "Syd" Andersson – drums, timbales, cabasa

== Charts ==
Weekly chart performance for "Flickorna på TV2"
| Chart (1980) | Peak position |
|---|---|
| Sweden (Topplistan) | 1 |
| Sweden (Poporama) | 2 |
