= På vårt sätt =

På vårt sätt may refer to:

- På vårt sätt (Miio album), 2003
- På vårt sätt (Scotts album), 2008
