= Samma skrot och korn =

Studio album by Gyllene Tider
- Released: 14 June 2019
- Length: 43 minutes
- Label: Cosmos Music Group
- Producer: Per Gessle, Christoffer Lundquist

Gyllene Tider chronology
Soldans på din grammofon (2019)	Samma skrot och korn (2019)

Samma skrot och korn is a studio album by Gyllene Tider, released on 14 June 2019.

== Track listing ==
All songs written and composed by Per Gessle, except "Någon att hålla i hand", which was written and composed by Allan Forss, Thomas Connor and Charles Thomas.

1. Skrot och korn
2. Det känns inte som maj
3. Jag drömde jag mötte fluortanten
4. Någon att hålla i hand
5. Vid hennes sida
6. Aftonstjärna
7. Vanliga saker
8. Bjud till
9. Låt denna trumslagarpojke sjunga
10. Mannen med gitarr
11. Bara i en dröm
12. Henry har en plan på gång
13. Allt det andra
14. Final

== Chart positions ==
(2019)	Peak position
Swedish Albums (Sverigetopplistan)	6
