= Ska vi gå hem till dig? =

Song by Lasse Tennander

from the album Lars Vegas
- Language: Swedish
- Released: 1974
- Genre: progg
- Songwriter: Lasse Tennander

"Ska vi gå hem till dig?" ("Shall We Go to Your Place?") is a song written and recorded by Lasse Tennander on his 1974 studio album Lars Vegas.

== Other versions ==
=== Magnus Uggla ===
Magnus Uggla recorded the song on his 1987 album Allting som ni gör kan jag göra bättre scoring a Svensktoppen hit charting for 12 weeks between 20 March-12 June 1988, peaking at third position.

=== Miio & Ayo ===
A Miio & Ayo recording on the 2003 album På vårt sätt failed to enter Svensktoppen on 30 November 2003.

=== Other recordings ===
The song has also been recorded by the Streaplers on the 1988 album Streaplers 88. and by Rolandz with Robert Gustavsson, on the 2010 album Jajamen.

== Charts ==
=== Miio & Ayo ===
Weekly charts

Chart (2003–2004)	Peak position
Sweden (Sverigetopplistan)	2

Year-end charts

Chart (2003)	Position
Sweden (Sverigetopplistan)	29
