= En sten vid en sjö i en skog/Tuffa tider (för en drömmare) =

"En sten vid en sjö i en skog/ Tuffa tider (för en drömmare)"

Single by Gyllene Tider

from the album Finn 5 Fel!
- Released: May 19, 2004
- Recorded: Sweden
- Genre: Pop
- Label: Capitol Records
- Songwriter: Per Gessle

Gyllene Tider singles chronology
"Juni, juli, augusti" (1996)	"En sten vid en sjö i en skog" / "Tuffa tider" (2004)	"Solsken" (2004)

"En sten vid en sjö i en skog" / "Tuffa tider (för en drömmare)" is a double A-side single by Swedish pop group Gyllene Tider, released on May 19, 2004. The single peaked at number one on the Swedish singles chart.

== Track listing ==
1. "En sten vid en sjö i en skog"
2. "Tuffa tider (för en drömmare)"

== Charts ==
=== Weekly charts ===
Chart (2004)	Peak position
Sweden (Sverigetopplistan)	1

=== Year-end charts ===
Chart (2004)	Position
Sweden (Hitlistan)	6

== Certifications ==
Region	Certification	Certified units/sales
Sweden (GLF)	Platinum	20,000^{^}
^{^} Shipments figures based on certification alone.
