= Jag borde förstås vetat bättre =

Single by Gyllene Tider

from the album Finn 5 fel!
- Released: February 2, 2005
- Recorded: Sweden
- Genre: Pop
- Label: Capitol Records
- Songwriter(s): Per Gessle

Gyllene Tider singles chronology
| "Solsken" (2004) | "Jag borde förstås vetat bättre" (2005) | "Man blir yr" (2013) |

"Jag borde förstås vetat bättre" ("I should of course have known better") is a single by Swedish pop group Gyllene Tider. Written by the band's lead singer Per Gessle, it was released on February 2, 2005, as the third and final single from Finn 5 fel!, which was the best selling album in Sweden during 2004. The song peaked at number 23 on the Swedish singles chart, becoming the fourteenth single by the band to chart in their home country and became a new entry at number ten on the Svensktoppen (Sveriges Radio chart) before peaking at number seven a week later. The release of the single also saw the album re-enter the charts.

== Critical reception ==
Anders Nunstedt from Expressen called it a "ballad that would sit well on Mazarin." (Per Gessle's solo album). While Björn Solfors of Aftonbladet named it a "ballad in the spirit of 'Tycker om när du tar på mej'." The song was dubbed a "Spector scented ballad" by David Stark from the Ystads Allehanda newspaper and in another review of the album by Svenska Dagbladet, Stefan Malmqvist said "In the song, you can even here a little echo of Sonny & Cher's "I Got You Babe".

== Composition ==
The writer of the song Per Gessle said, "This is a sad song, it is about a guy who still has hope." Anders Herrlin, Gyllene Tider's bass player, said it was Finn 5 fel!'s "only real ballad, with strings and everything."

== Track list ==
1. "Jag borde förstås vetat bättre" – 3:31
2. "Speciell" (T&A demo) – 2:31
3. "Tuffa tider" (T&A demo) – 3:25

== Charts ==
| Chart (2005) | Peak position |
|---|---|
| Swedish Singles Chart | 23 |
