= Finn 5 fel! =

Studio album by Gyllene Tider
- Released: 9 June 2004
- Genre: Pop
- Label: EMI

Gyllene Tider chronology
GT 25 - Samtliga hits! (2004)	Finn 5 fel! (2004)	GT25 Live! (2004)

Professional ratings
Review scores
Source	Rating
Aftonbladet	Favourable
Corren	3/5 stars
Expressen	4/5 stars
Expressen	4/5 stars
Svenska Dagbladet	4/6 stars
Sydsvenska Dagbladet	Favourable

Finn 5 fel! (English: Find 5 Errors!) is an album from Swedish pop group Gyllene Tider, released on 9 June 2004. The album stayed at #1 in Sweden for six weeks. It was the first full studio album recorded by the group since 1984's The Heartland Café.

The album was a critical and commercial success. It received favourable reviews and was the best selling album in Sweden during 2004 after selling 230,000 copies.

== Track listing ==
1. "En sten vid en sjö i en skog" (No. 1 in Swedish singles chart)
2. "Solsken" (No. 20 in Swedish singles chart)
3. "Tuffa tider (för en drömmare)" (No. 1 in Swedish singles chart)
4. "Ordinärt mirakel"
5. "Ta mej... nu är jag din!"
6. "Jag borde förstås vetat bättre" (No. 23 in Swedish singles chart)
7. "Du måste skämta"
8. "Nere på gatan"
9. "72"
10. "Ande i en flaska"
11. "Varje gång det regnar"
12. "Hjärta utan hem"
13. "Speciell"
14. "Har du nånsin sett en dröm gå förbi?"

== Critical reception ==
The album was generally well received by critics. In Expressen Anders Nunstedt declared the album a "new pop classic", giving it a 4/5 rating, the same rating given by Per Bjurman in Aftonbladet, writing that "despite the title, there are no faults to be found here". Some reviewers were more critical, with Helsingborgs Dagblads Peter Fällmar Andersson giving it a 2/5, writing that it was a "Nice summer sound - but without a spark".

== Charts ==
=== Weekly charts ===
Chart (2004)	Peak position
Norwegian Albums (VG-lista)	26
Swedish Albums (Sverigetopplistan)	1

=== Year-end charts ===
Chart (2004)	Position
Swedish Albums (Sverigetopplistan)	1

== Certifications ==
Region	Certification	Certified units/sales
Sweden (GLF)	3× Platinum	180,000^{^}
^{^} Shipments figures based on certification alone.
