= Gyllene Tider EP =

1996 EP by Gyllene Tider

EP by Gyllene Tider
- Released: 7 June 1996
- Recorded: May–June 1996
- Studio: EMI 1 (Skärmarbrink, Sweden); Europa 3 (Bromma, Sweden)
- Length: 15:10
- Label: Parlophone; EMI
- Producer: Michael Ilbert; Gyllene Tider

Gyllene Tider EP chronology
| Gyllene Tider (1978) | Gyllene Tider EP (1996) |

Gyllene Tider EP is an extended play (EP) by Swedish pop music group Gyllene Tider, released in June 1996 during their Återtåget 96 reunion tour. The EP was also released as a bonus EP for the compilation album Halmstads pärlor, and separately, as it also was a single with "Gå & fiska!" as its A-side. The EP peaked at number one on the Swedish Singles Chart and was certified platinum by IFPI Sweden, ending 1996 as Sweden's best-selling single. "Gå & fiska!" ("Go & Fish!") was given a Grammis for Best Song of the Year and a Rockbjörnen for Best Swedish Song.

== Track listing ==
1. "Gå & fiska!" – 3:56
2. "Juni, juli, augusti" – 3:52
3. "Harplinge" – 3:44
4. "Faller ner på knä" – 3:38

== Charts ==
=== Weekly charts ===
| Chart (1996) | Peak position |
|---|---|
| Sweden (Sverigetopplistan) | 1 |

=== Year-end charts ===
| Chart (1996) | Position |
|---|---|
| Sweden (Topplistan) | 1 |

== Certifications ==
| Region | Certification | Certified units/sales |
|---|---|---|
| Sweden (GLF) | Platinum | 50,000^{^} |
^{^} Shipments figures based on certification alone.
