= På vårt sätt (Miio album) =

Studio album by Miio
- Released: 2003
- Recorded: S 56
- Genre: Teen pop
- Length: 39 minutes

Miio chronology
| På vårt sätt (2003) | Fever (2004) |

På vårt sätt is a 2003 cover album by Swedish teen pop group Miio, consisting of recordings of several Swedish pop hits. The album peaked at number 15 on the Swedish Albums Chart.

== Track listing ==
1. "Hänger utanför din dörr" (Miio feat. Nico) - 3:37
2. "När vi två blir en" (Miio feat. Daddy Boastin') - 3:23
3. "Vara vänner" - 3:57
4. "Kom och värm dig" (Miio feat. Nico) - 3:25
5. "Vi ska gömma oss i varandra" - 3:33
6. "Fantasi" (Miio feat. Ayo) - 3:02
7. "Ska vi gå hem till dig" (Miio feat. Ayo) - 3:19
8. "Precis som du" - 4:07
9. "Regn hos mig" - 3:07
10. "Det hjärta som brinner" - 3:52
11. "När alla vännerna gått hem" - 3:34

== Charts ==
| Chart (2003) | Peak position |
|---|---|
| Sweden (Sverigetopplistan) | 15 |
