= The Heartland Café =

Studio album by Gyllene Tider
- Released: 17 February 1984
- Genre: Pop
- Label: EMI; Capitol Records (US)

Gyllene Tider chronology
Puls (1982)	The Heartland Café (1984)	Instant Hits (1989)

The Heartland Café is an album released by Swedish pop group Gyllene Tider on 17 February 1984. The group's first recorded foray into the English language, The Heartland Café was the second album to feature vocalist Marie Fredriksson singing back-up and proved to be a precursor to the Swedish super-duo Roxette, which consists of Fredriksson and Gyllene Tider's lead singer, Per Gessle. The album peaked at No. 18 on the Swedish albums chart.

== Planning and recording ==
Planning for The Heartland Café began after Gessle had released and publicized a solo album. It also followed a hiatus of sorts for the band. In liner notes written for a re-issue of the album in 1990, Gessle wrote, "Rehearsals were very sporadic, we almost didn't hang out at all, we were very sick of each other after many intense years."

In preparing to reassemble for an album, the members decided to step into English-language rock. Released by EMI Records, The Heartland Café was made in part to satisfy an interest expressed by label affiliate U.S. Capitol Records in the band due to its popularity in Sweden and its catchy pop/rock sound.

According to Gessle, preliminary demo recording and composition occurred in the band's native Halmstad, and the band recorded the album itself in Stockholm, finishing near Christmas 1983.

== The release ==
EMI released The Heartland Café in early 1984. Despite what Gessle claimed was lacklustre interest on the part of EMI itself, U.S. Capitol took six of the 11 tracks from the album and combined them on to an extended-play (EP) record (Mini-album) in the United States under the abridged title Heartland. In preparing for international release, Capitol requested that the members come up with a less indigenous name — Gyllene Tider is Swedish for "golden age". They decided on the title of a 1975 Dr. Feelgood song, "Roxette".

As a result, many Roxette fans consider Heartland the first true Roxette release even though it was not full-length and did not feature Fredriksson and Gessle up front. It would be another two and a half years before Roxette in its final form would release a full-length album, 1986's Pearls of Passion.

== The aftermath ==
While a milestone in the history of Roxette, The Heartland Café is considered a mild success in the history of Gyllene Tider, having sold 45,000 copies in its first distribution. The band toured briefly to support the album, but Gessle claimed that international distributors other than Capitol were not interested in it. In the United States, "I think it sold 8,000 copies or so", he wrote. Despite the disappointing sales, Gessle continued, "I remember what a kick it was to find us in our own slot (in front of Roxy Music) at Tower Records in L.A.!"

But The Heartland Café would prove to be a stopping point for the band. "Problems arose", Gessle wrote. Anders Herrlin wanted to move to Stockholm. I wanted to make another Swedish solo album. Money was getting short for everyone.… Almost a year went by, and nothing really happened." Though one song was recorded in that time that ultimately ended up on Gessle's next solo album, it would be another 11 years before the members of Gyllene Tider recorded another song, "She Doesn't Live Here Anymore" — this time featured on Roxette's 1995 greatest-hits compilation, Don't Bore Us, Get to the Chorus! — and toured again and then another eight years before the band united to record another album, Finn 5 fel!.

== Track listing ==
Swedish release

1. "Heartland"
2. "Run Run Run"
3. "Break Another Heart"
4. "Teaser Japanese"
5. "Another Place, Another Time"
6. "Demon Emptiness"
7. "Dreaming"
8. "When Love’s on the Phone (You Just Have to Answer)"
9. "Can You Touch Me?"
10. "Even If It Hurts (It's Alright)"
11. "Heartland Café"

United States release ("Heartland" under the name of Roxette)

1. "Teaser Japanese"
2. "Run Run Run"
3. "Break Another Heart"
4. "Dreaming"
5. "When Love’s on the Phone (You Just Have to Answer)"
6. "Another Place, Another Time"

Additional tracks on the 1990 CD re-issue (These songs were recorded in the same sessions as the others but not included on the original album.)

1. "Kiss From a Stranger"
2. "Young Girl"
3. "Anytime"
4. "Mr. Twilight"
5. "Rock On" (re-make of 1973 David Essex)

== Credits ==
- Producer: Lasse Lindbom
- Arranged by: Gyllene Tider

The band:

- Per Gessle - Lead vocals, backing vocals, drum programming
- Mats "MP" Persson - Electric & acoustic guitars, mandolin, synthesizer, grand piano, trumpet
- Anders Herrlin - Electric bass, synthesizer
- Micke "Syd" Andersson - Drums, backing vocals, percussion, synthesizer,
- Göran Fritzon - Grand piano, synthesizer, percussion. drum programming

Guest musicians:

- Erik Strandh - Accordion
- Lasse Lindbom - Backing vocals, percussion, chimes
- Marie Fredriksson - Backing vocals
- Niklas Strömstedt - Backing vocals
- Atsuko Katsube - Reading & writing of Japanese poem
- Bengt Palmers - String arrangements
- Gunnar Lööf - Morse signals
- Anne-Lie Rydé - Lead vocals
