= Gyllene Tider (album) =

Studio album by Gyllene Tider
- Released: 18 February 1980
- Recorded: August – September 1979
- Studio: EMI, Stockholm
- Genre: Power pop; new wave
- Length: 41:35
- Language: Swedish
- Label: Parlophone
- Producer: Lasse Lindbom

Gyllene Tider chronology
Gyllene Tider (EP) (1978)	Gyllene Tider (1980)	Moderna Tider (1981)

Singles from Gyllene Tider
- 1. "Himmel no. 7" / "Flickorna på TV2" Released: 10 December 1979; 2. "Ska vi älska, så ska vi älska till Buddy Holly / "(Dansar inte lika bra som) Sjömän" Released: 27 May 1980

Gyllene Tider was released on 18 February 1980 and is the debut studio album by Swedish pop group Gyllene Tider. The album peaked at number one on the Swedish Albums Chart and number 27 on the Norwegian Albums Chart.

As of July 1981, the album had sold 150,000 copies in Sweden since its release.

== Track listing ==
All tracks composed by Per Gessle and Mats "MP" Persson except "Skicka ett vykort, älskling" by Robbie van Leeuwen and "Billy" by Gessle. All lyrics written by Per Gessle.

Side Two
No.	Title	English Title	Length
1.	"Skicka ett vykort, älskling"	"Send Me a Postcard, Honey"	2:30
2.	"Himmel no. 7"	"Heaven Number Seven"	5:07
3.	"Revolver upp"	"Revolver Up"	2:28
4.	"Flickorna på TV2"	"The Girls on Channel Two"	3:50
5.	"(Dansar inte lika bra som) Sjömän"	"(Don't Dance As Well As) Sailors"	2:32
6.	"Sista gången jag såg Annie"	"The Last Time I Saw Annie"	5:03
Total length:			21:30

Side Two
No.	Title	English title	Length
1.	"Billy"	"Billy"	5:20
2.	"Fån telefån"	"Fool Telefool"	3:24
3.	"När ni faller, faller ni hårt"	"When You Fall, You Fall Hard"	4:12
4.	"Ska vi älska, så ska vi älska till Buddy Holly"	"If We're Making Love, We're Making Love to Buddy Holly"	3:44
5.	"Guld"	"Gold"	3:25
Total length:			20:05

== Gyllene Tider on CD ==
Gyllene Tider has been re-released on CD twice. First time in 1990, then with three bonus tracks:

- "24 December" (earlier released on Christmas compilation album Glitter, glögg & rock'n roll)
- "Åh Ziggy Stardust (var blev du av?)"
- "Marie i växeln"

The other re-release was a digipack-CD with the EP Gyllene Tider as bonus record.

== Personnel ==
Personnel according to the liner notes of the 2007 re-issue of the album.

Gyllene Tider

- Per Gessle – lead vocals (all tracks), backing vocals (2, 6, 9, 11), electric guitar (1, 4, 8, 10), 6 & 12-string acoustic guitars (2–3, 6), handclaps (3, 9), mixing engineer
- Mats "MP" Persson – lead vocals (11), backing vocals (1–4, 6, 8–11), 6 & 12-string electric guitars (1–10), 6 & 12-string acoustic guitars (2–3, 6, 9–10), organ (2, 8), piano (11), handclaps (3, 9), mixing engineer
- Göran Fritzon – electric Farfisa organ (1, 3–5, 10), electric piano (2, 4–10), handclaps (3, 9)
- Anders Herrlin – electric bass (1–5, 8–9), fretless bass (6–7, 10), handclaps (9)
- Micke "Syd" Andersson – drums (1–10), backing vocals (1–3, 6, 8–10), handclaps (3, 9), bongo drums (1), timbales (4), cabasa (4), vibraslap (9)

Technical

- Lasse "Trendy Hype" Lindbom – producer, mixing engineer
- Björn Boström – mixing engineer
- Calle Bengtsson – photography
- Kjell Andersson – layout, design

== Charts ==
Chart performance for Gyllene Tider
Chart (1980–1981)	Peak position
Norwegian Albums (VG-lista)	27
Swedish Albums (Sverigetopplistan)	1
