= Dags att tänka på refrängen =

2013 studio album by Gyllene Tider

Studio album by Gyllene Tider
- Released: 24 April 2013
- Genre: Pop
- Label: Capitol
- Producer: Clarence Öfwerman, Christoffer Lundquist, Gyllene Tider

Gyllene Tider chronology
GT25 Live! (2004)	Dags att tänka på refrängen (2013)	Soldans på din grammofon (2013)

Dags att tänka på refrängen is a studio album by Gyllene Tider, released 24 April 2013. The album topped the Swedish Albums Chart and was certified 2× platinum in the country.

== Track listing ==
1. "Det blir aldrig som man tänkt sej" – 2:53
2. "Man blir yr" – 3:02
3. "Single" – 3:02
4. "Allt jag lärt mej om livet (har jag lärt mej av Vera)" – 3:00
5. "Tio droppar regn" – 2:54
6. "Jag tänker åka på en lång lång lång lång lång resa" – 2:54
7. "Lyckopiller" – 3:07
8. "Chikaboom" – 3:08
9. "Anders och Mickes första band" – 3:24
10. "Tiden är en dåre med banjo" – 3:03
11. "Knallpulver" – 2:32
12. "Dags att tänka på refrängen" – 3:42

== Contributors ==
- Per Gessle – vocals, guitar
- Mats "MP" Persson – guitar, piano, banjo, choir
- Anders Herrlin – bass, choir
- Micke "Syd" Andersson – drums, choir
- Göran Fritzon – organ, piano, choir

== Charts ==
=== Weekly charts ===
Chart (2013)	Peak position	Certification
Norwegian Albums (VG-lista)	14	—
Swedish Albums (Sverigetopplistan)	1	GLF: 2× Platinum

=== Year-end charts ===
Chart (2013)	Position
Swedish Albums (Sverigetopplistan)	1
