= Parkliv! =

Live album by Gyllene Tider
- Released: 3 July 1990
- Recorded: 31 July 1981
- Venue: Mjölby Folkpark, Sweden
- Genre: Pop

Gyllene Tider chronology
Instant Hits (1989)	Parkliv! (1990)	Samlade Tider (1994)

Parkliv! (life in the park) is a live album from Swedish pop group Gyllene Tider, recorded live in Mjölby Folkets Park on 31 July 1981, and released on 3 July 1990. The live music was adapted into a movie by Lasse Hallström, which premiered at October 1981.

== Track listing ==
1. "Tuff tuff tuff (som ett lokomotiv)"
2. "På jakt efter liv"
3. "Det hjärta som brinner"
4. "Tylö Sun"
5. "Ljudet av ett annat hjärta"
6. "Flickorna på TV 2"
7. "Billy"
8. Presentation av bandet
9. "(Kom så ska vi) Leva livet"
10. "Ska vi älska, så ska vi älska till Buddy Holly"
11. "När vi två blir en"
12. "När alla vännerna gått hem"

== Charts ==
Chart performance for Parkliv!
Chart (2019)	Peak position
Swedish Albums (Sverigetopplistan)	19
