= Det hjärta som brinner =

Song by Gyllene Tider

from the album Moderna Tider
- Language: Swedish
- Released: 10 March 1981
- Genre: pop
- Label: Parlophone
- Songwriter: Per Gessle

"Det hjärta som brinner" is a song written by Per Gessle, and recorded by Gyllene Tider on the group's 1981 studio album Moderna Tider. On 26 March 1981, the song was appointed "Smash hit of the week" at Poporama.

Gyllene Tider also recorded the song in English, as "This Heart's on Fire", using the band name "Modern Times".

In 2003 the song was recorded by Miio on the group's album På vårt sätt. Marc Almond has also performed a live-version in English, as "A Place Full of Heartache".
