= Solsken =

Single by Gyllene Tider

from the album Finn 5 Fel!
- Released: 29 September 2004
- Recorded: Sweden
- Genre: Pop
- Label: Capitol Records
- Songwriter: Per Gessle

Gyllene Tider singles chronology
""En sten vid en sjö i en skog" / "Tuffa tider"" (2004)	"Solsken" (2004)	"Jag borde förstås vetat bättre" (2005)

"Solsken" ("Sunshine") is a single by Swedish pop group Gyllene Tider. Written by the band's lead singer Per Gessle, it was released on 29 September 2004 as the second single from Finn 5 fel!, which was the best-selling album in Sweden during 2004. The single peaked at number 20 on the Swedish singles chart, becoming the thirteenth single by the band to chart in their home country and became a new entry at number five on the Svensktoppen (Sveriges Radio chart) before peaking at number three a week later.

== Critical reception ==
Björn Solfors of Aftonbladet called it "A song with natural summer joy."

== Composition ==
The writer of the song Per Gessle said, "I found one of those voice recorders with a lot of old song ideas on it. I played the song to our producers, Clarence Öfwerman and Christoffer Lundquist, who liked it, so the day after I wrote the lyrics. Micke Andersson, Gyllene Tider's drummer, said "It is what you play when you're along the coast road down in Halmstad with a cute girl next to you."

== Track listing ==
1. "Solsken"
2. "Ordinärt mirakel" (T&A demo)
3. "Nere på gatan" (T&A demo)

== Charts ==
Chart (2004)	Peak position
Swedish Albums (Sverigetopplistan)	20
