= Puls (album) =

Studio album by Gyllene Tider
- Released: 26 August 1982
- Genre: Pop
- Label: Parlophone
- Producer: Lasse Lindbom

Gyllene Tider chronology
Moderna Tider (1981)	Puls (1982)	The Heartland Café (1984)

Puls is the third studio album by Swedish pop group Gyllene Tider, released on 26 August 1982. The album peaked at number one on the Swedish Albums Chart and number 12 on the Norwegian Albums Chart.

== Track listings ==
All lyrics and music written by Per Gessle except where noted otherwise.

1. "(Hon vill ha) Puls"
2. "Vän till en vän"
3. "Sommartider"
4. "Jag vänder mig om" (music: Mats Persson and Per Gessle)
5. "Kustvägen söderut" (music: Persson & Gessle)
6. "Vandrar i ett sommarregn" (with Eva Dahlgren as guest singer)
7. "Händerna"
8. "Flickan i en Cole Porter-sång"
9. "Upphetsad"
10. "Honung och guld"
11. "Som regn på en akvarell" (music: Persson & Gessle)
12. "För mycket är aldrig nog"
13. "Lova att du aldrig glömmer bort mig" (music: Persson)

=== Singles ===
- "Sommartider"

"Tylö Sun" and "Vart tog alla vänner vägen?" as B-sides.

- "Flickan i en Cole Porter-sång"

"I go to pieces" as B-side.

- "Vän till en vän" (flexidisc single for Veckorevyn.)

=== CD bonus tracks ===
Puls has been released to CD twice. Both editions contain eleven bonus tracks. The first version, which came out in 1990, they are bonus tracks on the record, and the newer digipack version they are on a bonus CD. The bonus tracks are:

1. "Tylö Sun" (Swedish language cover of The Rivieras "California Sun". B-side for "Sommartider")
2. "Vart tog alla vänner vägen?" (B-side for "Sommartider")
3. "I Go to Pieces" (lyrics & music: Del Shannon; B-side for "Flickan i en Cole Porter-sång")
4. "Threnody" (lyrics: Dorothy Parker; released on the compilation album Radio Parlophone)
5. "Hej!"
6. "Bara vara nära"
7. "Hi Fidelity"
8. "Offside!" (released on a compilation cassette named Rockriff från Halmstad)
9. "Skäl att tvivla"
10. "Marie, Marie" (music: Dave Alvin; released on Radio Parlophone)
11. "Ingenting av vad du behöver" (with Marie Fredriksson as guest singer. Released as a single for the magazine Schlager)

== Charts ==
Chart (1982)	Peak position
Norwegian Albums (VG-lista)	12
Swedish Albums (Sverigetopplistan)	1
