= Det är över nu =

Single by Gyllene Tider

from the album Halmstads pärlor
- A-side: "Det är över nu"
- B-side: ""Solens vän"
- Released: 8 May 1995
- Genre: pop
- Label: Parlophone
- Songwriter(s): Per Gessle
- Producer(s): Per Gessle, Michael Ilbert

Gyllene Tider singles chronology
"Småstad" (1989)	"Det är över nu" (1995)	"Kung av sand" (1995)

"Det är över nu" is a song written by Per Gessle, and recorded by Gyllene Tider, released as a single on 8 May 1995. The single peaked at number eleven on the Swedish Singles Chart. The song also became a Trackslistan hit, landing at number 65 on its Melody year-end chart. The song also charted at Svensktoppen, reaching ninth position on both 15 and 22 July 1995.

== Track listing ==
1. Det är över nu - 3:47
2. Solens vän - 4:02

== Charts ==
Chart (1995)	Peak position
Sweden (Sverigetopplistan)	11
