= Miio =

- Origin: Sweden
- Genres: teen pop
- Years active: 2003-

Miio is a teen pop group from Sweden, established by the Tetrapop producer in 2003. The group scored chart successes in Sweden between 2003 and 2005.

The group originally consisted of the girls Josefine Wahlsten and Linnéa Roxeheim. In 2004, Linnéa left the group, and was replaced by 19-year-old Mia who appeared on the group's second album.

== Discography ==
=== Albums ===
- På vårt sätt - 2003
- Fever - 2004

=== Singles ===
- När vi två blir en/När vi två blir en (instrumental) - 2003 (with Daddy Boastin')
- Ska vi gå hem till dig/Ska vi gå hem till dig - 2003 (with Ayo on the A-side)
- Girls Just Want to Have Fun/Girls Just Want to Have Fun (karaokeversion)/Girls Just Want to Have Fun (video) - 2004 (with Dita)
- Once/So Emotional - 2005
