= Poporama =

Former Swedish radio program

Poporama was a Swedish weekly radio show on SR P3, from 1974 to 1984, hosted by Kaj Kindvall, that listed the hits of the week. Poporama replaced the radio show Tio i Topp, which ran until June 1974. The official Poporama singles charts were published in 1992 in the book Poporama – Heta Högen 1974–1984, by Stefan Heiding (ISBN 91-971894-1-3).
