= Kung av sand =

Single by Gyllene Tider

from the album Halmstads pärlor
- A-side: "Kung av sand"
- B-side: ""Du är en gangster, älskling!"
- Released: 31 July 1995
- Genre: pop
- Label: Parlophone
- Songwriter: Per Gessle
- Producers: Per Gessle, Michael Ilbert

Gyllene Tider singles chronology
"Det är över nu" (1995)	"Kung av sand" (1995)	"Juni, juli, augusti" (1996)

"Kung av sand" is a song written by Per Gessle and recorded by Gyllene Tider, released as a single on 31 July 1995. The single peaked at number 31 on the Swedish singles chart. It also charted at Trackslistan for nine weeks between 26 August and 28 October 1995, and also topped the chart.

== Track listing ==
1. Kung av sand - 4:40
2. Du är en gangster, älskling! - 3:30

== Charts ==
Chart (1995)	Peak position
Sweden (Sverigetopplistan)	31

== Other recordings ==
In 2005, the song was recorded by Munkarna on the album 1:a kapitlet.
