= Gå & fiska! =

Song by Gyllene Tider

from the album Gyllene Tider EP
- Language: Swedish
- Released: 7 June 1996
- Genre: Swedish pop
- Label: Parlophone
- Songwriter: Per Gessle

"Gå & fiska!" ("Go and fish") is a song written by Per Gessle and recorded by Gyllene Tider for their 1996 eponymous EP. The song, together with the rest of the EP, was added to the 1996 re-release of the band's compilation album Halmstads pärlor, originally issued the year before.

"Gå & fiska!" won Song of the Year at the 1997 Grammis as well as Swedish Song of the Year 1996 at the Rockbjörnen awards.

Scoring a Svensktoppen hit for seven weeks, between 20 July and 31 August 1996, the track peaked at number five on the chart. It also charted on Trackslistan.

== Other versions ==
In 1998, the song was adapted and its title changed to "Gå & Smurfa" (go and Smurf) for the Smurf soundtrack album Smurfarna – Smurfhits 4.

== Charts ==
Chart performance for "Gå & fiska!"
Chart (2025)	Peak position
Sweden (Sverigetopplistan)	58
