= Flickan i en Cole Porter-sång =

Single by Gyllene Tider

from the album Puls
- B-side: "I Go to Pieces"
- Released: 7 December 1982
- Genre: pop
- Length: 3:48
- Label: EMI
- Songwriter: Per Gessle
- Producer: Lasse Lindbom

Millas Mirakel singles chronology
"Sommartider" (1982)	"Flickan i en Cole Porter-sång" (1982)	"Teaser Japanese" (1983)

Flickan i en Cole Porter-sång is a song written by Per Gessle, and recorded by Gyllene Tider on the album Puls. It also released as a single on 7 December 1982, and also featured Kjell Öhman playing the accordion. The single became a hit in Denmark. The song was also recorded in English, as "That Girl in a Cole Porter song".

The opening and closing riff of the song includes the main riff of the actual Cole Porter song I Get A Kick Out Of You, from the musical Anything Goes.

== Track listing ==
1. Flickan i en Cole Porter-sång - 3:48
2. I Go to Pieces - 2:40

== Charts ==
Chart (1982)	Peak position
Denmark (Trackslisten)	1
