= Sommartider =

1982 single by Gyllene Tider

Single by Gyllene Tider

from the album Puls
- Language: Swedish
- B-side: "Tylö Sun"; "Vart tog alla vänner vägen?"
- Released: 18 June 1982
- Genre: Pop rock
- Length: 3:18
- Label: Parlophone
- Songwriter: Per Gessle
- Producer: Lasse Lindbom

Gyllene Tider singles chronology
"Ljudet av ett annat hjärta" (1981)	"Sommartider" (1982)	"Flickan i en Cole Porter-sång" (1982)

"Sommartider", written by Per Gessle, is the song that throughout the years has become considered the signature song for Swedish pop group Gyllene Tider. It was released as a single on 18 June 1982. It was re-released both on 27 June 1989 and in 1995. The original version peaked at number six on the Swedish Singles Chart and number three on the Norwegian Singles Chart, and the 1989 version peaked at number three on the Swedish Singles Chart. It has been certified gold in Sweden. "Sommartider" was also recorded with lyrics in the English language, with the name "Summer City". It has over the years become a popular long time hit song, often played by radio and other public media also after 2020.

== Track listing and formats ==
- Swedish 7-inch single

A. "Sommartider" – 3:18
B1. "Tylö Sun" – 2:41
B2. "Vart tog alla vänner vägen?" – 2:49

- Swedish 12-inch maxi-single and reissue CD single (1989)
1. A. "Sommartider" (Remix '89) – 7:38
2. B1. "Sommartider" – 3:18
3. B2. "Tylö Sun" – 2:41
4. B3. "Vart tog alla vänner vägen?" – 2:49

== Charts ==
=== Weekly charts ===
Weekly chart performance for "Sommartider"
Chart (1982–2023)	Peak position
Finland (Suomen virallinen lista)	12
Norway (VG-lista)	3
Sweden (Sverigetopplistan)	6

=== Sommartider Remix '89 ===
Weekly chart performance for "Sommartider Remix '89"
Chart (1989)	Peak position
Sweden (Sverigetopplistan)	3
