= Gyllene Tider =

Swedish pop group

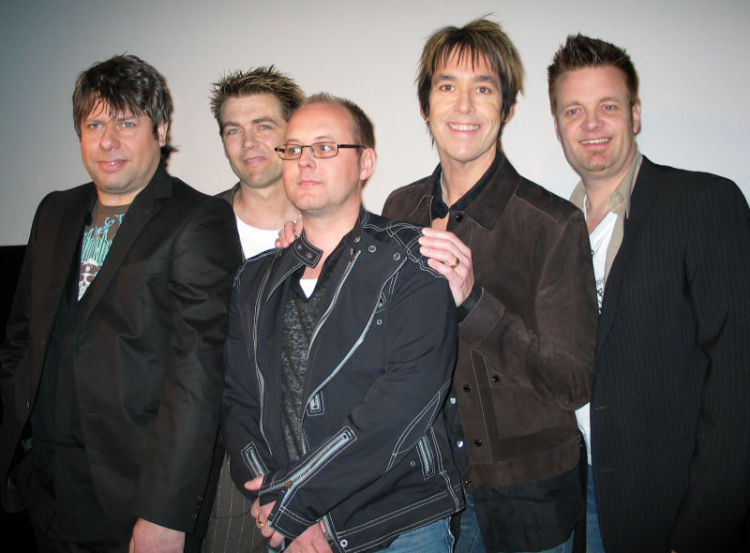
- Gyllene Tider in 2004

Background information
- Origin: Halmstad, Sweden
- Genres: Pop, rock
- Years active: 1976–1985 (reunions in 1995–1996, 2004, 2010, 2013, 2019, and 2023)
- Labels: EMI, Capitol
- Members: Per Gessle; Mats Persson; Micke Andersson; Anders Herrlin; Göran Fritzon
- Website: gyllenetider.com

Gyllene Tider (Swedish: [ˈjʏ̂lːɛnɛ ˈtîːdɛr]; "Golden Times") is a Swedish pop group fronted by Roxette singer, guitarist, and songwriter Per Gessle. They are one of the best-selling Swedish bands ever and have had numerous hits in Scandinavia, starting with their breakthrough song "Flickorna på TV2", in 1980. Since breaking up in 1985, the band has held regular reunions, with the latest one taking place in 2023.

== History ==
In 1976, Per Gessle met Mats Persson, a member of the band Audiovisuellt Angrepp, and they formed the duo Grape Rock. They were joined by Micke Syd Andersson, Anders Herrlin, and Göran Fritzon, and the quintet was born. They changed their name to Gyllene Tider, an allusion to Mott the Hoople's song "The Golden Age of Rock 'n' Roll". In 1980, they released their self-titled debut album, which became a success in Sweden. "Flickorna på TV2" was the record's biggest hit.

The band's second album, released in 1981 under the name Moderna Tider, also enjoyed success and was followed by a national tour. The following year, Gyllene Tider issued Puls, which included the hits "Sommartider" and "Flickan i en Cole-Porter-sång". In March 1985, the group broke up after releasing the English-language album The Heartland Cafe. Per Gessle continued with a solo career and formed Roxette with Marie Fredriksson in 1986.

Since Gyllene Tider's breakup, several Platinum-selling compilation albums have been released, and a number of live reunions have taken place, starting with the Återtåget tour, in 1996. In 2004, the band celebrated its twenty-fifth anniversary with the first new album in over twenty years and a summer tour in July and August.

Gyllene Tider reunited again on 14 August 2010 as a surprise encore during Roxette's concert in Halmstad, both bands' hometown. They performed a three-song set consisting of "Juni, Juli, Augusti", "Sommartider", and "När alla vännerna gått hem", with Marie Fredriksson and Roxette's backing band joining onstage for the last number. In January 2013, the group announced a new album and summer tour in Sweden, both called Dags att tänka på refrängen. The record was released on 24 April 2013.

In January 2019, Gyllene Tider announced a farewell tour to celebrate forty years together. They released the album Samma skrot och korn the same year. In 2023, the band announced another tour as well as a new double album, titled Hux Flux, released in June.

== Discography ==
=== Albums ===
==== Studio albums ====
Year	Album	Peak positions		Sales	Certification
Year	Album	SWE	NOR	Sales	Certification
1980	Gyllene Tider	1	27	SWE: 150,000	
1981	Moderna Tider	1	2	SWE: 160,000	
1982	Puls	1	12		
1984	The Heartland Café	18	—		
2004	Finn 5 fel!	1	26	SWE: 230,000	SWE: 3× Platinum
2013	Dags att tänka på refrängen	1	14		SWE: 2× Platinum
2019	Samma skrot och korn	6	—		
2023	Hux Flux	1	—		

==== Live albums ====
Year	Album	Peak positions		Certification
Year	Album	SWE	NOR	Certification
1990	Parkliv! (Live at Mjölby Folkets Park on 31 July 1981)	19	—	
1997	Återtåget Live!	19	—	Gold
2004	GT25 Live!	28	—	
2019	GT40 Live!	18	—	

==== Compilations ====
Year	Album	Peak positions		Certification
Year	Album	SWE	NOR	Certification
1989	Instant Hits!	3	—	Platinum
1994	Samlade Tider	—	—	
1995	Halmstads pärlor	1	2	5× Platinum
1997	Ljudet av ett annat hjärta/En samling	—	—	
2000	Konstpaus	10	—	
2004	GT 25 – Samtliga hits!	1	6	Platinum
2013	Soldans på din grammofon	4	—	
2019	GT40 Hits! Made in Halmstad	26	—	
2021	Moderna tider (40 år)	44	—	

=== EPs ===
- Gyllene Tider (EP) (aka "Billy" and "den gula EP:n") (1978)
- Swing & Sweet (1981)

=== DVD and VHS ===
- Återtåget (documentary from TV4, live, and interviews) (1997)
- Karaoke Hits! (2004)
- Parkliv! (concert/documentary from 1981 filmed by Lasse Hallström) (2004)
- GT25 Live! (2004)
- Live sommaren 2013 (2013)
- GT40 Live Ullevi (2019)

=== Singles ===
Year	Title	Peak positions		Certification	Album
Year	Title	SWE	NOR	Certification	Album
1980	"Himmel No. 7 / Flickorna på TV2"	1	—		Gyllene Tider
1980	"Ska vi älska, så ska vi älska till Buddy Holly"	8	—		Gyllene Tider
1980	"När vi två blir en"	1	1		Moderna Tider
1981	"(Kom så ska vi) Leva livet"	13	—		Moderna Tider
1981	"Ljudet av ett annat hjärta"	3	—		Moderna Tider
1982	"Sommartider"	6	3	Gold	Puls
1989	"Sommartider Remix '89"	3	—		Instant Hits!
1995	"Det är över nu"	11	—		Halmstads pärlor
1995	"Kung av sand"	31	—		Halmstads pärlor
1996	"Juni, juli, augusti"	37	—		Gyllene Tider EP
2004	"En sten vid en sjö i en skog/Tuffa tider (för en drömmare)"	1	—		Finn 5 fel!
2004	"Solsken"	20	—		Finn 5 fel!
2005	"Jag borde förstås vetat bättre"	23	—		Finn 5 fel!
2013	"Man blir yr"	—	—		Dags att tänka på refrängen
2018	"Bäst när det gäller" (featuring Linnea Henriksson)	— (Note: "Bäst när det gäller" did not enter the Sverigetopplistan but peaked at number five on the Swedish Heatseeker chart.)	—		Non-album single
2023	"Chans"	—	—		Hux Flux
2023	"Gyllene Tider igen"	—	—		Hux Flux
2023	"Dagar att dansa"	—	—		Hux Flux
2024	"Flickan i en Cole Porter-sång"	— (Note: "Flickan i en Cole Porter-sång" did not enter the Swedish Singellista Chart but peaked at number seven on the Swedish Heatseeker Chart.)	—		Non-album single
