= När alla vännerna gått hem =

Song by Gyllene Tider

from the album Gyllene Tider
- Language: Swedish
- Released: November 1978
- Genre: pop
- Label: Parlophone
- Songwriter(s): Per Gessle
- Composer(s): Per Gessle

När alla vännerna gått hem, written by Per Gessle, is a ballad by Swedish pop group Gyllene Tider, released on the 1978 "Gyllene Tider" EP. "När alla vännerna gått hem" is famous for being used as closing song at Gyllene Tider's concerts, and on Gyllene Tider compilations.

Pop group Aramis scored a 1980 minor hit with a cover of the song.

At Gyllene Tiders concert at Brottet in Halmstad on August 10, 1996, Per Gessle sung it live in a duet with Marie Fredriksson, well known from Roxette. On July 12, 2013, this was repeated during Gyllene Tider's concert in Ullevi stadium in Gothenburg.

"När alla vännerna gått hem" has also been recorded with lyrics in English, as "When All the Lights Have Faded Away".

Pop group Miio covered the song on their 2003 album "På vårt sätt".
