= (Kom så ska vi) Leva livet =

Single by Gyllene Tider

from the album Moderna Tider
- A-side: "(Kom så ska vi) Leva livet"
- B-side: "Leka med elden"
- Released: 29 April 1981
- Genre: pop
- Label: Parlophone
- Songwriter(s): Per Gessle, Mats Persson

Gyllene Tider singles chronology
"När vi två blir en" (1980)	"(Kom så ska vi) Leva livet" (1981)	"Ljudet av ett annat hjärta" (1981)

"(Kom så ska vi) Leva livet" is a song written by Per Gessle and Mats "MP" Persson, recorded by Gyllene Tider and released as a single on 29 April 1981.

It peaked at number 13 on the Swedish Singles Chart. The song also charted Svensktoppen for eight weeks between 31 May and 22 November 1981, peaking at second position.

== Track listing ==
=== Side A ===
1. (Kom så ska vi) Leva livet - 3:41

=== Side B ===
1. Leka med elden - 4:51

== Charts ==
Chart (1981)	Peak position
Sweden (Sverigetopplistan)	13
