= Juni, juli, augusti =

Single by Gyllene Tider

from the album Gyllene Tider EP
- B-side: "Ingen går i ringen"
- Released: September 16, 1996
- Recorded: Stockholm, Sweden
- Genre: Pop
- Length: 3:52
- Label: Parlophone
- Songwriter(s): Per Gessle

Gyllene Tider singles chronology
"EP" (1995)	"Juni, juli, augusti" (1996)	"En sten vid en sjö i en skog/Tuffa tider (för en drömmare)" (2004)

"Juni, juli, augusti" is a single by Swedish pop group Gyllene Tider, released on September 16, 1996. The single peaked at number 37 on the Swedish Singles Chart. On November 9, 1996, an attempt was made to take the song to the Svensktoppen chart, but failed. However, the song did reach the Swedish Tracks list.

== Background ==
The name "Juni, juli, augusti" refers to the months of June, July and August, which are associated with summer in temperate zones in the Northern Hemisphere. The lyrics describe joy and expectation for the advent of summer and its warm winds, after longing during the colder and darker seasons of the year.

== Track listing ==
1. "Juni, juli, augusti" - 3:52
2. "Ingen går i ringen" - 2:28

== Charts ==
Chart (1996)	Peak position
Sweden (Sverigetopplistan)	37
