= När vi två blir en =

Single by Gyllene Tider

from the album Moderna Tider
- Language: Swedish
- B-side: "Kärleken är inte blind (men ganska närsynt)"
- Released: 29 October 1980
- Recorded: August 1980
- Studio: EMI, Stockholm
- Genre: Pop; reggae
- Label: Parlophone
- Songwriter: Per Gessle
- Producer: Lasse Lindbom

Gyllene Tider singles chronology
"Ska vi älska, så ska vi älska till Buddy Holly" (1980)	"När vi två blir en" (1980)	"(Kom så ska vi) Leva livet" (1981)

Audio
- "När vi två blir en" on YouTube

"När vi två blir en", also informally known as "Jag vill känna din kropp emot min", is a song written by Per Gessle and performed by Swedish pop group Gyllene Tider. It was released as a single on 29 October 1980. Its lyrics describe teenage love. Göran Fritzson wrote the Farfisa intro and the hook. Gyllene Tider also recorded the song with lyrics in English, as "Beating Heart", releasing it as a promotional single on 1 September 1981 using the group name Modern Times.

The song became a major hit in Sweden and Norway, topping the singles charts in both countries. A recording by Miio & Daddy Boastin' became a 2003-2004 hit, topping the Swedish singles chart.

The Gyllene Tider version charted at Svensktoppen for 10 weeks between 14 December 1980 and 1 March 1981, peaking at 2nd position. The version by Miio & Daddy Boastin' was a contender for Svensktoppen on 3 August 2003, but failed to enter the chart.

== Single track listing ==
=== När vi två blir en ===
==== Side A ====
1. När vi två blir en - 3:05

==== Side B ====
1. Kärleken är inte blind (men ganska närsynt) - 3:47

=== Beating Heart ===
==== Side A ====
1. Beating Heart (När vi två blir en) - 3.06

==== Side B ====
1. To Play with Fire (Leka med elden) - 4.57

== Charts ==
=== Gyllene Tider version ===
Chart (1980–1981)	Peak position
Norway (VG-lista)	1
Sweden (Sverigetopplistan)	1

=== Miio feat. Daddy Boastin' version ===
Chart (2003–2004)	Peak position
Sweden (Sverigetopplistan)	3
