= Ljudet av ett annat hjärta =

Single by Gyllene Tider
- A-side: "Ljudet av ett annat hjärta"
- B-side: "Teena"
- Released: 24 October 1981
- Genre: pop
- Songwriters: Per Gessle; Mats Persson

Gyllene Tider singles chronology
| "Beating Heart (vi två blir en)" (1981) | "Ljudet av ett annat hjärta" (1981) | "Sommartider" (1982) |

"Ljudet av ett annat hjärta", written by Per Gessle and Mats "MP" Persson, is a song recorded by Swedish pop group Gyllene Tider, released as a single on 24 October 1981. It peaked at number three on the Swedish Singles Chart. The song became a Svensktoppen hit for nine weeks between 14 February and 14 April 1982, peaking at number six.

== Single track listing ==
1. "Ljudet av ett annat hjärta" - 3:50
2. "Teena" - 6.05

== English ==
The song was also recorded with lyrics in English, as "Fever in the Night".

== Charts ==
| Chart (1981–1982) | Peak position |
|---|---|
| Sweden (Sverigetopplistan) | 3 |
