= Sweden in the Eurovision Song Contest 2007 =

- Eurovision Song Contest 2007
- Participating broadcaster: Sveriges Television (SVT)
- Country: Sweden
- Selection process: Melodifestivalen 2007
- Selection date: 10 March 2007

Competing entry
- Song: "The Worrying Kind"
- Artist: The Ark
- Songwriters: Ola Salo

Placement
- Final result: 18th, 51 points

Participation chronology

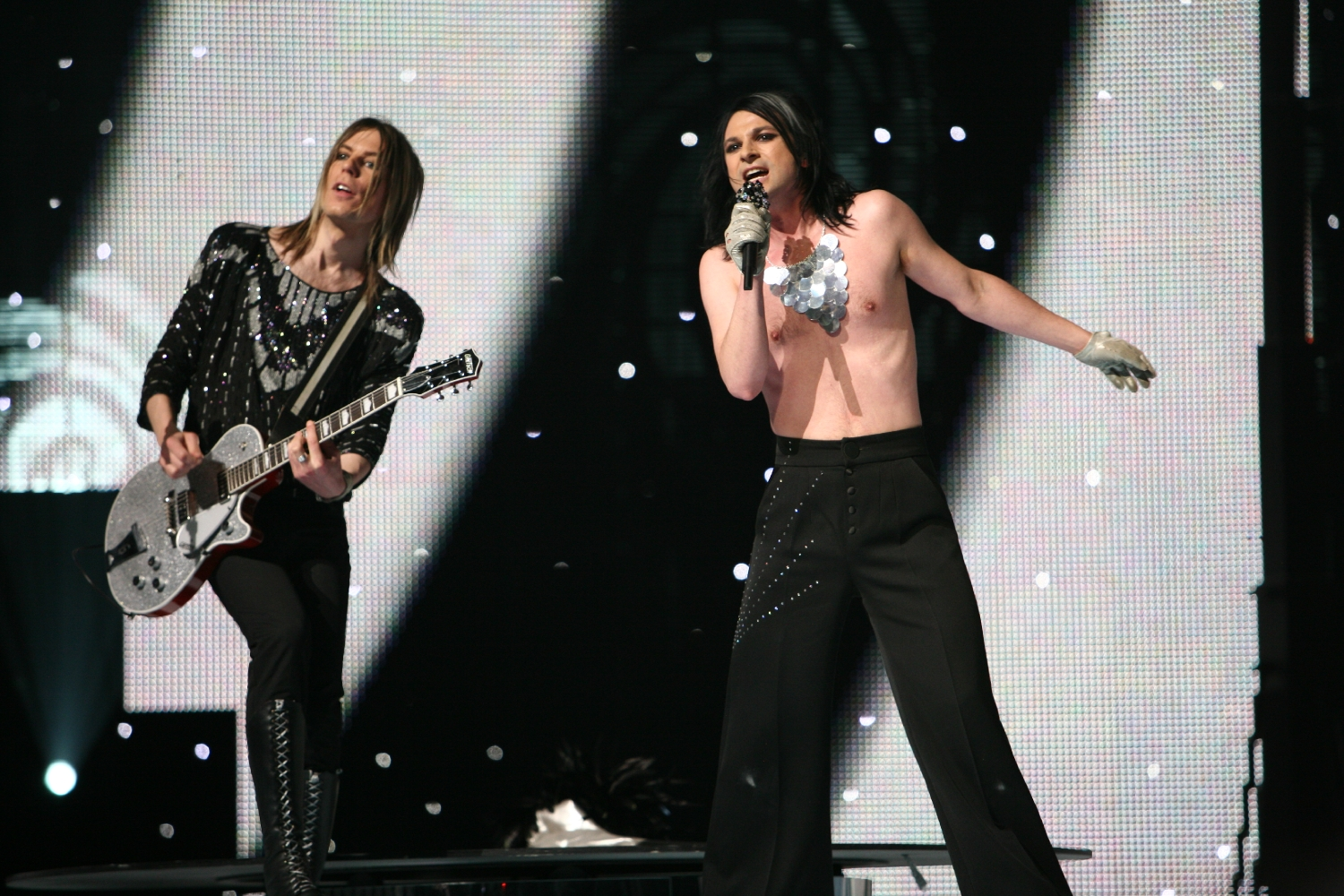
The Ark performing "The Worrying Kind" at the Eurovision final.

Sweden was represented at the Eurovision Song Contest 2007 with the song "The Worrying Kind", written by Ola Salo, and performed by The Ark. The Swedish participating broadcaster, Sveriges Television (SVT), selected its entry through Melodifestivalen 2007.

== Before Eurovision ==
=== Melodifestivalen 2007 ===
Sveriges Television (SVT) selected its entry in the Eurovision Song Contest 2007 through Melodifestivalen 2007, which consisted of four heats on 3, 10, 17, and 24 February; a second chance round on 3 March; and the final which took place on 10 March. The method of selection remained the same as previous years with four heats consisting of eight songs each, with the two top-placing entries securing spots for the final and the 3rd and 4th place entries earning spots in the Second Chance round. The Second Chance round was live this year with competitors going up against each other for the last two spots in the final, facing off in a bracket-based tournament. All six shows were hosted by Kristian Luuk.

Some familiar faces returned to Melodifestivalen this year, among them past Swedish representatives Tommy Nilsson (1989), Svante Thuresson (1966), Jessica Andersson (2003 as a member of Fame), and Nanne Grönvall (1996). In addition, Andreas Lundstedt represented Switzerland in 2006 as a member of six4one.

==== Final ====
SVT held the final on 10 March 2007 at the Globe Arena in Stockholm. The winner was chosen by 11 regional juries (50%) and televoting (50%).

R/O	Artist	Song	Jury	Televote	Total	Place
1	Andreas Johnson	"A Little Bit of Love"	101	88	189	2
2	Sonja Aldén	"För att du finns"	40	22	62	6
3	Anna Book	"Samba Sambero"	1	0	1	9
4	Sebastian	"When the Night Comes Falling"	39	0	39	8
5	Marie Lindberg	"Trying to Recall"	4	66	70	5
6	Måns Zelmerlöw	"Cara Mia"	61	110	171	3
7	Tommy Nilsson	"Jag tror på människan"	0	0	0	10
8	Sanna Nielsen	"Vågar du, vågar jag"	33	11	44	7
9	Sarah Dawn Finer	"I Remember Love"	78	44	122	4
10	The Ark	"The Worrying Kind"	116	132	248	1

== At Eurovision ==
Sweden automatically qualified to the grand final, because it was in the top 10 the year before. In the grand final, it performed 12th in the running order, following Georgia and preceding France, and finished in 18th place with 51 points.

=== Voting ===
==== Points awarded to Sweden ====
Points awarded to Sweden (Final)
Score	Country
12 points	Denmark; Norway
10 points	Iceland
8 points	Finland
7 points	United Kingdom
6 points	
5 points	
4 points	
3 points	
2 points	Andorra
1 point	

==== Points awarded by Sweden ====
Points awarded by Sweden (Semi-final)
Score	Country
12 points	Iceland
10 points	Serbia
8 points	Hungary
7 points	Turkey
6 points	Norway
5 points	Macedonia
4 points	Denmark
3 points	Belarus
2 points	Andorra
1 point	Latvia

Points awarded by Sweden (Final)
Score	Country
12 points	Finland
10 points	Serbia
8 points	Hungary
7 points	Turkey
6 points	Bosnia and Herzegovina
5 points	Russia
4 points	Greece
3 points	Ukraine
2 points	Moldova
1 point	Germany
