= Emil & the Heartland Express =

Rock band

- Origin: Sweden
- Genres: Heartland rock
- Years active: 2007–present
- Members: Emil Karlsson; Erica Karlsson; Therese Hållén; Fredrik Nordh; Robin East; Jesper Götlind; Rebecka Josefsson; Ulf Moström; Rasmus Andersson; Robert Häggstam
- Past members: Johan Ahl; Fredrik Andersson; Fredrik Kelemen; Anna-Franciska Reiske; Linus Lösegård; Pär Kunze; Andreas Hamberg; Charlotte Lilliestierna

Emil & the Heartland Express (formerly known as Emil & the Warmlanders) is a Swedish heartland rock/revival rock group, consisting of ordinary rock band set plus a brass section and a violin. The band formed in Arvika, Sweden, where the members met at Musikhögskolan Ingesund. The leadsinger and songwriter, Emil Karlsson, is strongly influenced by such artists as Bruce Springsteen and Stefan Andersson.

They have, among other acts, played at Get a Gig festival, won the district finales in the Swedish contest Rockkarusellen, ranked number one on the radio list Värmlandstoppen. The band released their debut album ”Changing Lanes” in spring 2010 in started recording the next album in August the same year.

In 2013 the band released the EP ”Emil & the Warmlanders”, containing the songs When dreams are shattered, Perfection's out of range and Give me a sign.

In 2014 and 2015 the band went out on summer mini tours in southern Sweden, as well as performing at Swedish festival Folk & Rock in Segmon, Värmland and reached the regional finals in the radio contest Svensktoppen Nästa.

Between 2015 and 2020 the band took a break, but reemerged in the summer of 2020 with a new name - Emil & the Heartland Express - and released their second album, ”Burning hearts”, while performing the whole album live at Carson City, Berga.

From 2019 and forward, Emil has sworn to release a new Christmas single every year, starting with ”December nights” and ”I’ll be coming home (for Christmas eve)” in 2020.

== Members ==
- Emil Karlsson - lead vocals, guitar, harmonica (2007–present)
- Erica Karlsson - trumpet (2007–present)
- Therese Hållén - violin (2007–present)
- Fredrik Nordh - bass guitar (2007–present)
- Robin East - piano, keys (2007–present)
- Jesper Götlind - tenor saxophone (solo saxophone) (2008–present)
- Rebecka Josefsson - vocals (2009–present)
- Ulf Moström - guitars, vocals (2010–present)
- Rasmus Andersson - drums (formerly organs) (2010–present)
- Robert Häggstam - alto saxophone, clarinet, flute (2010–present)

Until 2014, drums were performed by Johan Ahl and from 2010 to 2014 Rasmus played organs, but later replaced Johan as drummer of the band. The alto saxophone was first performed by Pär Kunze (2007-2009), then by Linus Lösegård (2009-2010), Anna-Franciska Reiske (2010) before Robert joined the band. When Ulf first joined the band, he played the acoustic guitar, while Fredrik Kelemen (now member of Swedish power metal band Lancer) played the electric guitar.

== Discography ==
=== Albums ===
Title	Year	Producer
Changing lanes	2010	Emil & the Warmlanders
Burning hearts	2020	Emil & the Heartland Express

=== Singles ===
Title	Year	Producer
Emil & the Warmlanders (EP)	2013	Emil & the Warmlanders, Fredrik Häggstam
Darkest before the dawn (Single)	2015	Emil & the Warmlanders, Carl Utbult
December nights (Single)	2019	Emil & the Warmlanders
The big man (Single)	2020	Emil & the Heartland Express
Have a little faith (Single)	2020	Emil & the Heartland Express
I’ll be coming home (for Christmas eve) (Single)	2020	Emil & the Heartland Express
Hold on (Single)	2021	Emil & the Heartland Express

== Sources ==
- http://www.rockkarusellen.se
- http://www.sr.se
- http://www.heartlandexpressband.com
- http://www.warmlanders.com
- http://open.spotify.com/album/0gf9uYdit1YXtyrX9Le2OU
