= Melodifestivalen 2007 =

Swedish music competition

Dates and venue
- Heat 1: 3 February 2007
- Heat 2: 10 February 2007
- Heat 3: 17 February 2007
- Heat 4: 24 February 2007
- Second chance: 3 March 2007
- Final: 10 March 2007

Organisation
- Broadcaster: Sveriges Television (SVT)
- Presenter: Kristian Luuk

Participants
- Number of entries: 32
- Number of finalists: 10

Vote
- Voting system: Heats and Second chance: 100% public vote Final: 50% public vote, 50% jury vote
- Winning song: "The Worrying Kind" by The Ark

Melodifestivalen 2007 was the 47th edition of the Swedish music competition Melodifestivalen, which was organised by Sveriges Television (SVT) and took place over a six-week period between 3 February and 10 March 2007. The winner of the competition was the band The Ark with the song "The Worrying Kind", who represented Sweden in the Eurovision Song Contest 2007, where they came eighteenth with 51 points.

== Format ==
The heats for Melodifestivalen 2007 began on 3 February 2007. Ten songs from these heats qualified for the final on 10 March 2007.

Competition Schedule
Show	Date	City	Venue
Heat 1	3 February 2007	Jönköping	Kinnarps Arena
Heat 2	10 February 2007	Gothenburg	Scandinavium
Heat 3	17 February 2007	Örnsköldsvik	Swedbank Arena
Heat 4	24 February 2007	Gävle	Läkerol Arena
Second chance	3 March 2007	Nyköping	Rosvalla Eventcenter
Final	10 March 2007	Stockholm	Stockholm Globe Arena

=== Second chance round changes ===
On 15 August 2006, SVT announced that the second chance round, which had by then taken place on the Sunday after the last heat, would be turned into a full Saturday night show. That meant that Melodifestivalen 2007 would become a six-week competition, rather than the five-week event it had been the previous years.

As well as turning the second chance round into a main show in an arena, the voting for it was also changed. A knock-out system was introduced where each of the eight artists were split into four duels, and the voters voted for their favorite in each one. The four winners went through to a second round, where they were paired off again, and the winners of each duel went through to the final.

=== Wildcards ===
Starting in 2004, four out of the 32 participants were selected directly by the contest's producers, in order to increase musical and artistic breadth. Each artist, called "wildcard", participated in a different heat. The wildcards in 2007 were the following:

Artist	Song	Heat
Uno & Irma	"God morgon"	Heat 1
The Ark	"The Worrying Kind"	Heat 2
Sebastian	"When The Night Comes Falling"	Heat 3
Magnus Uggla	"För kung och fosterland"	Heat 4

== Competing entries ==
Artist	Song	Songwriter(s)
Addis Black Widow	"Clubbin'"	Armias Mamo; Dianne Wiston
After Dark	"(Åh) När ni tar saken i egna händer"	Henrik Wikström; Kent Olsson
Andersson & Gibson	"Anything But You"	Aleena Gibson; Stefan Andersson
Andreas Johnson	"A Little Bit of Love"	Andreas Johnson; Peter Kvint
Andreas Lundstedt	"Move"	Andreas Lundstedt; Johan Röhr
Anna Book	"Samba Sambero"	Thomas G:son
Caroline af Ugglas	"Tror på dig"	Caroline af Ugglas; Heinz Liljedahl; Mattias Torell
Cosmo4	"What's Your Name"	Henrik Wikström; Kent Olsson; Niklas Edberger
Elin Lanto	"Money"	Lasse Anderson
Emile Azar	"Vi hade nåt"	Larry Forsberg; Lennart Wastesson; Sven-Inge Sjöberg
Jessica Andersson	"Kom"	Lina Eriksson; Mårten Eriksson; Rasmus Lindvall; Robert Wåtz
Jimmy Jansson	"Amanda"	Jimmy Jansson; Thomas G:son
Lustans Lakejer	"Allt vi en gång trodde på"	Johan Kinde
Magnus Carlsson	"Live Forever"	Michael Clauss; Dan Attlerud; Thomas Thörnholm
Magnus Uggla	"För kung och fosterland"	Anders Henriksson; Magnus Uggla
Måns Zelmerlöw	"Cara Mia"	Fredrik Kempe; Henrik Wikström
Marie Lindberg	"Trying to Recall"	Marie Lindberg
MissMatch	"Drop Dead"	Felix Persson; Figge Boström; Marit Woody; Märta Grauers; Stefan Woody
Nanne	"Jag måste kyssa dig"	Ingela Forsman; Nanne Grönvall; Peter Grönvall
Regina Lund	"Rainbow Star"	Bobby Ljunggren; Fredrik Kempe; Regina Lund
Sanna Nielsen	"Vågar du, vågar jag"	Bobby Ljunggren; Fredrik Kempe; Henrik Wikström
Sarah Dawn Finer	"I Remember Love"	Peter Hallström; Sarah Dawn Finer
Sebastian	"When The Night Comes Falling"	Peter Kvint; Sebastian Karlsson
Sheida	"I mina drömmar"	Niklas Roswall; Rostam Mirlashari; Ulrika Bodén
Sofia	"Hypnotized"	Dimitrios Stassos; Jason Gill; Sofia Berntson
Sonja Aldén	"För att du finns"	Bobby Ljunggren; Sonja Aldén
Svante Thuresson & Anne-Lie Rydé	"Första gången"	Bobby Ljunggren; Dan Sundqvist; Sonja Aldén
The Ark	"The Worrying Kind"	Ola Salo
The Attic feat. Therese	"The Arrival"	Eric Amarillo; Michael Feiner
Tommy Nilsson	"Jag tror på människan"	Johan Stentorp; Lasse Andersson; Tommy Nilsson
Uno & Irma	"God morgon"	Staffan Hellstrand; Uno Svenningsson
Verona	"La musica"	Joakim Udd; Johan Fjellström; Karl Eurén; Robert Rydholm

== Contest overview ==
=== Heat 1 ===
The first heat took place on 3 February 2007 at the Kinnarps Arena in Jönköping. 2,989,000 viewers watched the heat live. A total of 379,212 votes were cast, with a total of SEK 1,086,555 collected for Radiohjälpen.

R/O	Artist	Song	Votes			Place	Result
R/O	Artist	Song	Round 1	Round 2	Total	Place	Result
1	Elin Lanto	"Money"	20,960	32,121	53,081	4	Second chance
2	Andersson & Gibson	"Anything But You"	17,610	24,984	42,594	5	Out
3	Anna Book	"Samba Sambero"	44,039	65,184	109,223	1	Final
4	Addis Black Widow	"Clubbin'"	3,717	—N/a	3,717	8	Out
5	Andreas Lundstedt	"Move"	17,145	—N/a	17,145	6	Out
6	Tommy Nilsson	"Jag tror på människan"	34,098	42,442	76,540	2	Final
7	Sofia	"Hypnotized"	16,695	—N/a	16,695	7	Out
8	Uno & Irma	"God morgon"	26,680	31,919	58,599	3	Second chance

=== Heat 2 ===
The second heat took place on 10 February 2007 at the Scandinavium in Gothenburg. 3,211,000 viewers watched the heat live. A total of 508,716 votes were cast, with a total of SEK 1,336,344 collected for Radiohjälpen.

R/O	Artist	Song	Votes			Place	Result
R/O	Artist	Song	Round 1	Round 2	Total	Place	Result
1	Regina Lund	"Rainbow Star"	7,188	—N/a	7,188	8	Out
2	Marie Lindberg	"Trying to Recall"	52,041	81,441	133,482	2	Final
3	Jimmy Jansson	"Amanda"	34,291	38,447	72,738	3	Second chance
4	Cosmo4	"What's Your Name"	17,648	20,549	38,197	5	Out
5	Lustans Lakejer	"Allt vi en gång trodde på"	8,808	—N/a	8,808	7	Out
6	Jessica Andersson	"Kom"	20,808	27,575	48,383	4	Second chance
7	Svante Thuresson & Anne-Lie Rydé	"Första gången"	12,965	—N/a	12,965	6	Out
8	The Ark	"The Worrying Kind"	81,793	104,065	185,858	1	Final

=== Heat 3 ===
The third heat took place on 17 February 2007 at the Swedbank Arena in Örnsköldsvik. 3,177,000 viewers watched the heat live. A total of 623,321 votes were cast, with a total of SEK 1,399,219 collected for Radiohjälpen.

R/O	Artist	Song	Votes			Place	Result
R/O	Artist	Song	Round 1	Round 2	Total	Place	Result
1	Måns Zelmerlöw	"Cara Mia"	52,975	85,623	138,598	1	Final
2	MissMatch	"Drop Dead"	7,062	—N/a	7,062	8	Out
3	Magnus Carlsson	"Live Forever"	44,193	56,692	100,885	5	Out
4	Sheida	"I mina drömmar"	15,839	—N/a	15,839	6	Out
5	The Attic feat. Therese	"The Arrival"	10,960	—N/a	10,960	7	Out
6	Sebastian	"When The Night Comes Falling"	50,136	70,760	120,896	2	Final
7	Sonja Aldén	"För att du finns"	38,530	58,529	97,059	4	Second chance
8	Nanne	"Jag måste kyssa dig"	61,051	65,791	126,842	3	Second chance

=== Heat 4 ===
The fourth heat took place on 24 February 2007 at the Läkerol Arena in Gävle. 3,146,000 viewers watched the heat live. A total of 648,319 votes were cast, with a total of SEK 1,584,630 collected for Radiohjälpen.

R/O	Artist	Song	Votes			Place	Result
R/O	Artist	Song	Round 1	Round 2	Total	Place	Result
1	Magnus Uggla	"För kung och fosterland"	39,159	46,239	85,398	3	Second chance
2	Emile Azar	"Vi hade nåt"	17,388	—N/a	17,388	7	Out
3	Sanna Nielsen	"Vågar du, vågar jag"	32,092	43,882	75,974	4	Second chance
4	Caroline af Ugglas	"Tror på dig"	26,926	—N/a	26,926	6	Out
5	After Dark	"(Åh) När ni tar saken i egna händer"	35,877	40,651	76,528	5	Out
6	Sarah Dawn Finer	"I Remember Love"	54,395	85,587	139,982	2	Final
7	Verona	"La musica"	16,516	—N/a	16,516	8	Out
8	Andreas Johnson	"A Little Bit of Love"	95,969	111,662	207,631	1	Final

=== Second chance ===
The second chance round took place on 3 March 2007 at the Rosvalla Eventcenter in Nyköping. 3,038,000 viewers watched the heat live. A total of 1,073,000 votes were cast.

Round 1
Duel	R/O	Artist	Song	Votes	Result
I	1	Elin Lanto	"Money"	31,924	Out
I	2	Jessica Andersson	"Kom"	39,683	Round 2
II	1	Jimmy Jansson	"Amanda"	81,699	Out
II	2	Sanna Nielsen	"Vågar du, vågar jag"	100,358	Round 2
III	1	Uno & Irma	"God morgon"	44,527	Out
III	2	Sonja Aldén	"För att du finns"	70,863	Round 2
IV	1	Nanne	"Jag måste kyssa dig"	118,217	Out
IV	2	Magnus Uggla	"För kung och fosterland"	149,331	Round 2

Round 2
Duel	R/O	Artist	Song	Votes	Result
I	1	Jessica Andersson	"Kom"	45,046	Out
I	2	Sanna Nielsen	"Vågar du, vågar jag"	105,980	Final
II	1	Sonja Aldén	"För att du finns"	143,980	Final
II	2	Magnus Uggla	"För kung och fosterland"	142,540	Out

=== Final ===
The final took place on 10 March 2007 at the Stockholm Globe Arena in Stockholm. 3,976,000 viewers watched the heat live. A total of 2,072,918 votes were cast, with a total of SEK 5,117,374 collected for Radiohjälpen.

R/O	Artist	Song	Juries	Televote		Total	Place
R/O	Artist	Song	Juries	Votes	Points	Total	Place
1	Andreas Johnson	"A Little Bit of Love"	101	371,222	88	189	2
2	Sonja Aldén	"För att du finns"	40	128,806	22	62	6
3	Anna Book	"Samba Sambero"	1	42,205	0	1	9
4	Sebastian	"When The Night Comes Falling"	39	86,861	0	39	8
5	Marie Lindberg	"Trying to Recall"	4	228,422	66	70	5
6	Måns Zelmerlöw	"Cara Mia"	61	402,133	110	171	3
7	Tommy Nilsson	"Jag tror på människan"	0	50,850	0	0	10
8	Sanna Nielsen	"Vågar du, vågar jag"	33	113,012	11	44	7
9	Sarah Dawn Finer	"I Remember Love"	78	157,227	44	122	4
10	The Ark	"The Worrying Kind"	116	492,180	132	248	1

Detailed jury votes
R/O	Song	Örebro	Luleå	Falun	Karlstad	Umeå	Norrköping	Gothenburg	Sundsvall	Växjö	Malmö	Stockholm	Total
1	"A Little Bit of Love"	1	8	10	12	10	12	12	8	10	8	10	101
2	"För att du finns"	4	2	1	1	1	6	10	6	2	1	6	40
3	"Samba Sambero"		1										1
4	"When The Night Comes Falling"	6		6	4	6	2	6	1	6		2	39
5	"Trying to Recall"										4		4
6	"Cara Mia"	12	6	4	2	8	1	2	4	8	10	4	61
7	"Jag tror på människan"												0
8	"Vågar du, vågar jag"	2	4	2	10	4	4	1	2	1	2	1	33
9	"I Remember Love"	8	10	8	8	2	10	4	10	4	6	8	78
10	"The Worrying Kind"	10	12	12	6	12	8	8	12	12	12	12	116
Jury spokespersons
Örebro – Ann-Christine Bärnsten; Luleå – Christian Lundqvist and Jakob Samuel; Falun – Kikki Danielsson; Karlstad – Magnus Bäcklund; Umeå – Niklas Andersson; Norrköping – Magnus Carlsson; Gothenburg – Jessica Andersson; Sundsvall – Göran Fristorp; Växjö – Josefine Sundström; Malmö – Björn Kjellman; Stockholm – Carola Häggkvist

== Ratings ==
Viewing figures by show
Show	Air date	Viewers (millions)	Ref.
Heat 1	3 February 2007	2.989	
Heat 2	10 February 2007	3.211	
Heat 3	17 February 2007	3.177	
Heat 4	24 February 2007	3.146	
Second chance	3 March 2007	3.038	
Final	10 March 2007	3.976	

== See also ==
- Eurovision Song Contest 2007
- Sweden in the Eurovision Song Contest 2007
- Sweden in the Eurovision Song Contest
