= Vinterland =

Vinterland may refer to

- Vinterland (film), Norwegian 2007 film
- Vinterland (album), 2014 Sarah Dawn Finer Christmas album, or the title track
- "Vinterland", a 2020 song by Laleh

== See also ==
- Hej, mitt vinterland, 1963 Lena Conradson Christmas song
- Winterland (disambiguation)
