= Jenny Rogneby =

Swedish writer born in Ethiopia

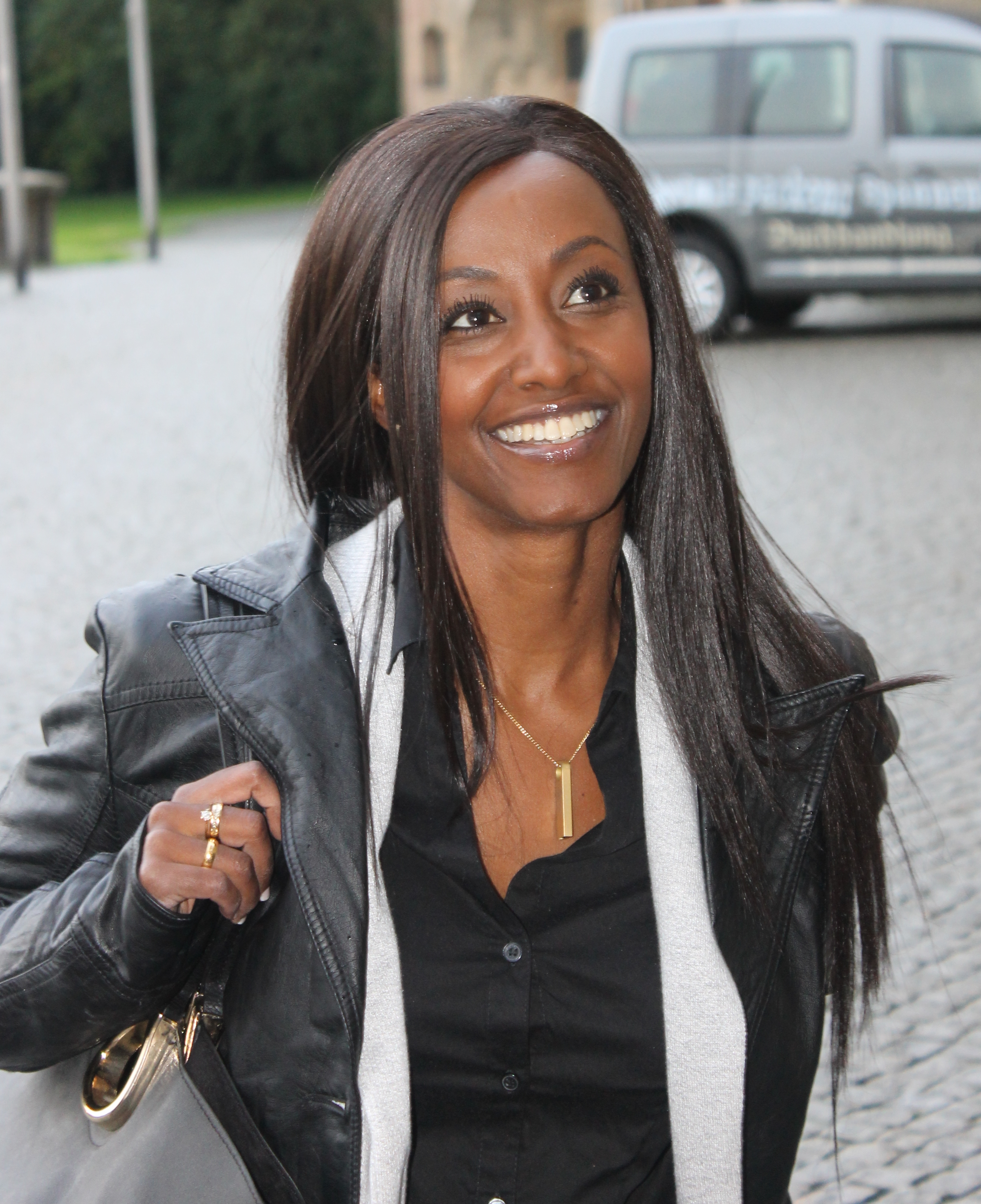
- Born: 13 August 1974 (age 52); Ethiopia
- Occupations: pop singer, criminologist and writer
- Writing career
- Genre: detective fiction

Jenny Rogneby (born 13 August 1974) is a Swedish writer who was born in Ethiopia. She was a member of the group Cosmo4 and a criminologist in Stockholm. She took to writing detective fiction in Malta with her character, Leona.

== Life ==
Rogneby was born in Ethiopia, and she was adopted by a Swedish couple when she was one years old. She was brought up in northern Sweden where she was the only black person in her community.

She was a member of the group Cosmo4 with three other singers. One of them was Carin da Silva who left the group in 2006. In 2007, Cosmo4 appeared with a new line up at the concert come concert named, Melodifestivalen. The winners of this concert would be the next Swedish Eurovision entry. Cosmo4 were not successful.

The group was quietly disbanded, and a scheduled album was never released. Rogneby became an investigator with the Swedish police which she carried out for seven years. She left for Malta where she planned to write, and her debut novel was called Leona – The die has been cast and it was part of a three-book agreement with a New York publisher. It resulted in The Leona Series of novels. Her character Leona wants to live in Malta and she is both a member of the police and a potential criminal. The reader is challenged to find out who is the victim.

Her second novel, Leona: Any Means Necessary, was again about her fictional investigator in Stockholm. Rogneby's character is similar to her previous job. Her character is investigating crime but also changing her own life at the same time.

In 2022 her detective novel, the Mediator, had a new lead in Angela Lans.
