= Moving On (Sarah Dawn Finer album) =

Studio album by Sarah Dawn Finer
- Released: 26 August 2009
- Genre: Gospel, soul
- Label: King Island Roxystar Recordings
- Producer: Joacim Beckman, Johan Röhr

Sarah Dawn Finer chronology
A Finer Dawn (2007)	Moving On (2009)	Winterland (2010)

Moving On is the second studio album by Swedish singer Sarah Dawn Finer. It was released on 26 August 2009 and peaked at number one on the Swedish Albums Chart.

== Track listing ==
1. Standing Strong (Sarah Dawn Finer, Michel Zitron, Tobias Gustavsson)
2. Stupid (Sarah Dawn Finer, Fredrik Kempe)
3. Anything Tonight (Sarah Dawn Finer, Fredrik Kempe, Anders Hansson)
4. Moving On (Sarah Dawn Finer, Fredrik Kempe)
5. Virus (Sarah Dawn Finer, Björn Djupström, Papaconstantinou, Alex)
6. Is That Enough (Sarah Dawn Finer, Dilba)
7. Not the One (Sarah Dawn Finer, Dilba)
8. Right Track (Sarah Dawn Finer, Magnus Tingsek)
9. I Don't Need Your Love Song (Sarah Dawn Finer, Magnus Tingsek)
10. Does She Know You (Sarah Dawn Finer, Tom Howe, Iain James, Glen Scott)
11. What if this is Love (Sarah Dawn Finer, Peter Kvint, Aleena)
12. For a Friend (Sarah Dawn Finer, Peter Hallström)

== Contributors ==
- Sarah Dawn Finer - vocals
- Johan Fransson - drums
- Joacim Beckman – programming, producer
- Johan Röhr - programming, producer

== Charts ==
Chart (2009)	Peak position
Swedish Albums (Sverigetopplistan)	1
