= The Vintage Virgin =

Studio album by Sebastian
- Released: March 7, 2007
- Recorded: 2006 in Sweden
- Genre: Pop, rock
- Length: 40:38
- Label: Sony BMG Music Entertainment

Sebastian chronology
Sebastian (2006)	The Vintage Virgin (2007)	The Most Beautiful Lie (2009)

The Vintage Virgin is the second studio album from Swedish Pop/Rock and alternative rock singer Sebastian Karlsson, led by the singles "Words and Violence" (#3) and the Melodifestivalen 2007 entry "When the Night Comes Falling" (#2) the album was released on March 7, 2007 one year and one week after his previous and first album "Sebastian", and this time it debuted at number 2.

== Track listing ==
1. "Troubled Skies" – 3:44
2. "When the Night Comes Falling" – 3:14
3. "Charlie Calm Down" – 3:18
4. "I Can Feel You" – 3:46
5. "Lead Me There" – 3:29
6. "Words and Violence" – 3:40
7. "Falling in Love With You Again" – 4:05
8. "Kiss Kiss Kiss" – 3:29
9. "Bear With Me" – 3:40
10. "Trigger" – 3:44
11. "Drink this Bottle of Wine" – 4:24
- All songs written by Sebastian Karlsson and Peter Kvint

== Chart performance ==
Sweden Top 60 Albums
Vecka	1
Position	2

== Singles ==
- 2006 – "Words and Violence" No. 3
- 2007 – "When the Night Comes Falling" No. 2
