= Love Made Me Do It =

Love Made Me Do It may refer to:

- Love Made Me Do It (album), a 2010 album by Elin Lanto
- "Love Made Me Do It" (song), a 2018 song by Cheryl
