= Sanningen kommer om natten =

Studio album by Sarah Dawn Finer
- Released: 10 October 2012
- Genre: gospel, soul
- Length: 49 minutes
- Label: King Island Roxystar Recordings
- Producer: Johan Röhr

Sarah Dawn Finer chronology
Winterland (2010)	Sanningen kommer om natten (2012)	Vinterland (2014)

Sanningen kommer om natten is the fourth studio album released by Swedish singer Sarah Dawn Finer. It was released on 10 October 2012. Most songs were written by Mauro Scocco and produced by Johan Röhr. It also contains the singles "Nu vet du hur det känns" and "Balladen om ett brustet hjärta".

== Track listing ==
1. Tårar blir till guld - Mauro Scocco
2. Den andra kvinnan - Mauro Scocco
3. Balladen om ett brustet hjärta - Mauro Scocco
4. Med dig vid min sida - Mauro Scocco
5. Sagan om oss två (duet with Salem Al Fakir) - Sarah Dawn Finer, Salem Al Fakir
6. Vasastan - Mauro Scocco
7. Nu vet du hur det känns - Mauro Scocco
8. Stockholm om natten (with Näääk) - Mauro Scocco
9. Såna som jag - SDF & Mauro Scocco
10. Lova mig ingenting - Sarah Dawn Finer & Magnus Tingsek
11. Till dig - Mauro Scocco
12. Kärleksvisan (bonus track, acoustic version) - Sarah Dawn Finer & Peter Hallström

== Charts ==
=== Weekly charts ===
Chart (2012–2013)	Peak position
Swedish Albums (Sverigetopplistan)	3

=== Year-end charts ===
Chart (2012)	Position
Swedish Albums (Sverigetopplistan)	36
