= Tiden före nu =

Studio album by Tommy Nilsson
- Released: 3 August 2005
- Recorded: Camril studio, March–July 2005
- Genre: soft rock
- Length: 37 minutes
- Label: Sony Music Entertainment
- Producer: Lasse Andersson

Tommy Nilsson chronology
| Fri att vara här (1999) | Tiden före nu (2005) | I år är julen min (2010) |

Tiden före nu is a 2005 Tommy Nilsson album.

== Track listing ==
1. Vi brann
2. Amelia
3. Allt ditt hjärta är
4. Klockan är 12
5. En annan vind
6. Vill du ha sex med mig
7. God man
8. Det bästa av dig
9. Kärleken ropar ditt namn
10. Farväl

== Contributors ==
- Tommy Nilsson - singer, bass, keyboard, drum programming, composer, lyrics
- Lasse Andersson - bass, guitar, keyboard, drum programming
- Jocke Blomgren - guitar

== Charts ==
=== Weekly charts ===
| Chart (2005) | Peak position |
|---|---|
| Swedish Albums (Sverigetopplistan) | 2 |

=== Year-end charts ===
| Chart (2005) | Position |
|---|---|
| Swedish Albums (Sverigetopplistan) | 71 |
