= I Remember Love =

Single by Sarah Dawn Finer

from the album A Finer Dawn
- Released: 5 March 2007
- Recorded: Roxy Recordings
- Genre: gospel, soul
- Songwriter(s): Sarah Dawn Finer, Peter Hallström

Sarah Dawn Finer singles chronology
"I Remember Love" (2007)	"Stay" (2007)

"I Remember Love" is a song written by Peter Hallström and Sarah Dawn Finer, and performed by Sarah Dawn Finer at Melodifestivalen 2007. The song participated in the semifinal in Gävle on 24 February 2007, and reached the finals in the Stockholm Globe Arena on 10 March 2007, where it ended up 4th.

On 5 March 2007, the single was released, and by mid June 2007 the single sold gold, after being at the Swedish singles chart since its first week of release.

The song also charted at Svensktoppen, entering on 1 April 2007 reaching a second position, topping the chart the next week, before being knocked down by Andreas Johnson's "A Little Bit of Love" on 15 April 2007. The song made its 30th final Svensktoppen visit on 21 October 2007, before leaving the chart the next week.

== Charts ==
=== Weekly charts ===
Chart (2007)	Peak position
Sweden (Sverigetopplistan)	4

=== Year-end charts ===
Chart (2007)	Position
Sweden (Sverigetopplistan)	18
