= Sarah Dawn Finer =

Swedish singer, songwriter and actress

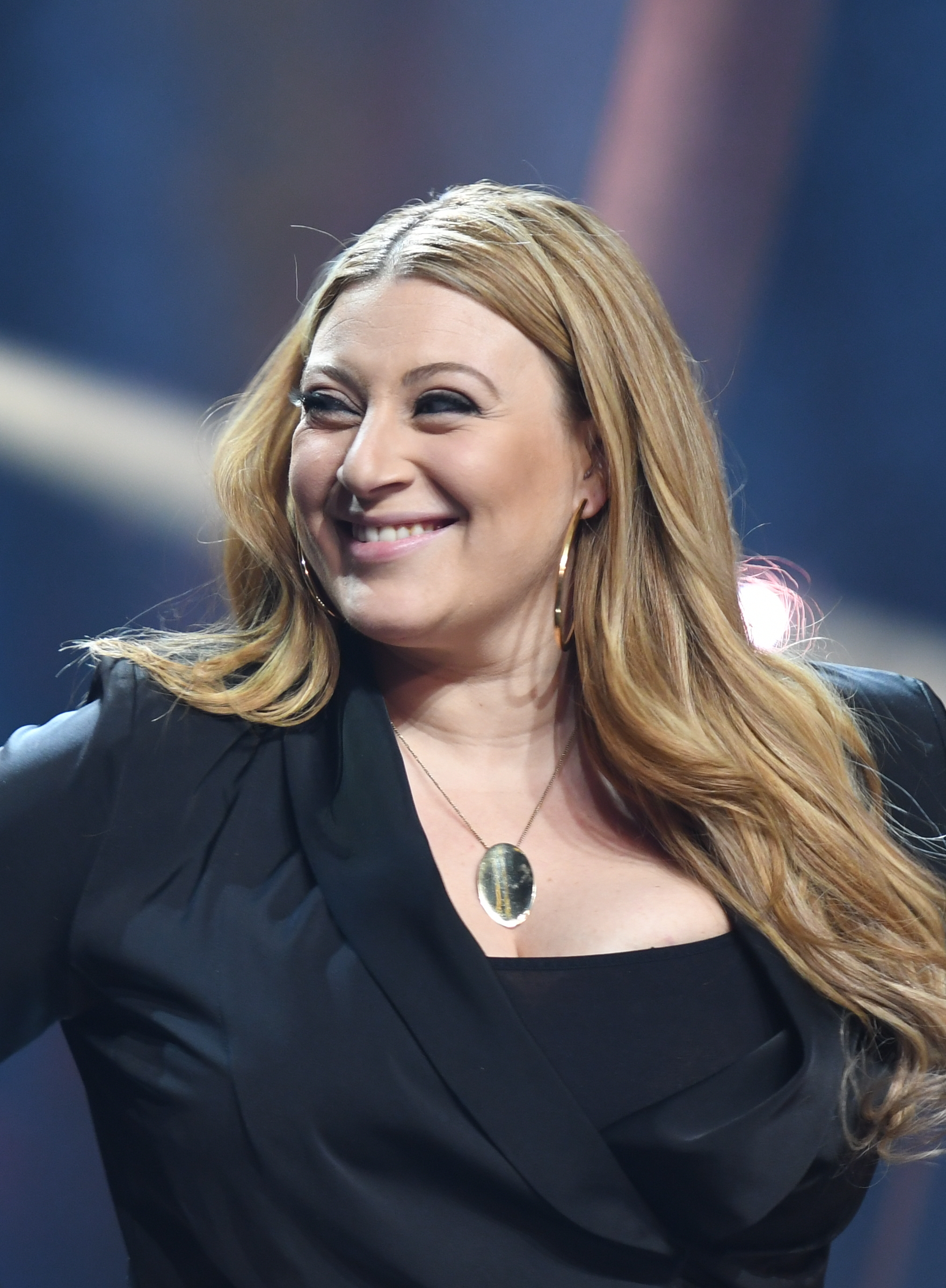
- Finer in 2019

Background information
- Born: 14 September 1981 (age 44)
- Origin: Stockholm, Sweden
- Genres: Soul, pop
- Occupation: Singer
- Instruments: Vocals, guitar
- Label: Roxy
- Website: Official website

Sarah Dawn Finer (born 14 September 1981) is a Swedish singer, songwriter and actress. She is also known for playing Lynda Woodruff, a character created by Edward af Sillén to be a parody spokesperson of the European Broadcasting Union (EBU) in Melodifestivalen and the Eurovision Song Contest.

== Background ==
Finer was born and grew up in Sweden. Her father, David Finer, is English, while her mother, Francine Lee Mirro-Finer is Jewish American. Her sister Zoie Finer and half-brother Rennie Mirro are also singers. Her paternal grandmother Dorothy Irving was a music coach and professor in Stockholm.

In 1989, she appeared on Swedish television as a child actor, and as a result she toured Sweden with her sister Zoie and other children. In 1994, she had a principal part in the Bert TV series and was also in a soul gospel choir for seven years. While working as a backing vocalist behind several famous singers, she also attended the Adolf Fredrik's Music School, a high-profile song-and-chorus school in Stockholm, where she was also president of the students' union.

== Solo music career ==
Finer's first, self-titled, EP consisting of six songs was released in 2006. Her first full-length debut album A Finer Dawn, released 30 May 2007, debuted at number two on the Swedish album charts. The singles from the album were "I Remember Love", "Stockholm by Morning" and "A way back to love".

Her next album Moving On was released on 26 August 2009. The album included the title single "Moving On" and "Does She Know You?" and "Standing Strong". The album Moving On debuted at Number 1 on iTunes in its digital release on 17 August 2009. The CD version was released on 26 August 2009, debuting at Number 1 in the Swedish Charts.

Both the singles "I Remember Love" and "Moving On" were the most played songs on Swedish radio in 2007 and 2009. Her 3rd album "Winterland" also sold gold and debuted at Number 2 on the Swedish charts. She made a holiday special live from Hamburger Börs 2010 for SVT, and went on a critically acclaimed tour with "Winterland" in 2011. Her fourth album was "Sanningen Kommer Om Natten" 2011, which received 5/5 in DI Weekend by Jan Gradvall, after which she went on a critically acclaimed live tour with 2012. She received a songwriting award/scholarship from SKAP in 2012. She has recorded duets with Moneybrother, Peter Jöback, Mauro Scocco, Tommy Körberg, Fatboy, Samuel Ljungbladh and Patrik Isaksson.

=== Musicals ===
She played Sally Bowles in ”Cabaret” both at Stockholm City Theatre 2015-2016 and at Uppsala City Theatre in 2014, and was nominated for "Best Actress in a leading role" for her role as Lucy in Jekyll & Hyde at Chinateatern 2008. She also starred as Joanne in the rock musical Rent in 2001, 2002 and 2003 at Göta Lejon, a tour with Riksteatern and at Göteborgs Operan. She then starred in the musical Godspell at Parkteatern/Stockholms Stadsteater 2002.

=== Shows ===
Finer was featured in Ugglas revy with Magnus Uggla at Chinateatern 2010; Livet with Jonas Gardell in 2002 and 2003; Happy Holidays at the Grand Hôtel with her half-brother Rennie Mirro and Karl Dyall in 2012; and Humorator in 2006 with Mikael Tornving, Henrik Hjelt and Ulf Kvensler.

She was SVT's Christmas host for 2012. Finer was one of three hosts of the radio/television music aid show Musikhjälpen in December 2013.

She is the current host of the Swedish musical game show Så ska det låta.

== Melodifestivalen and Eurovision participation ==
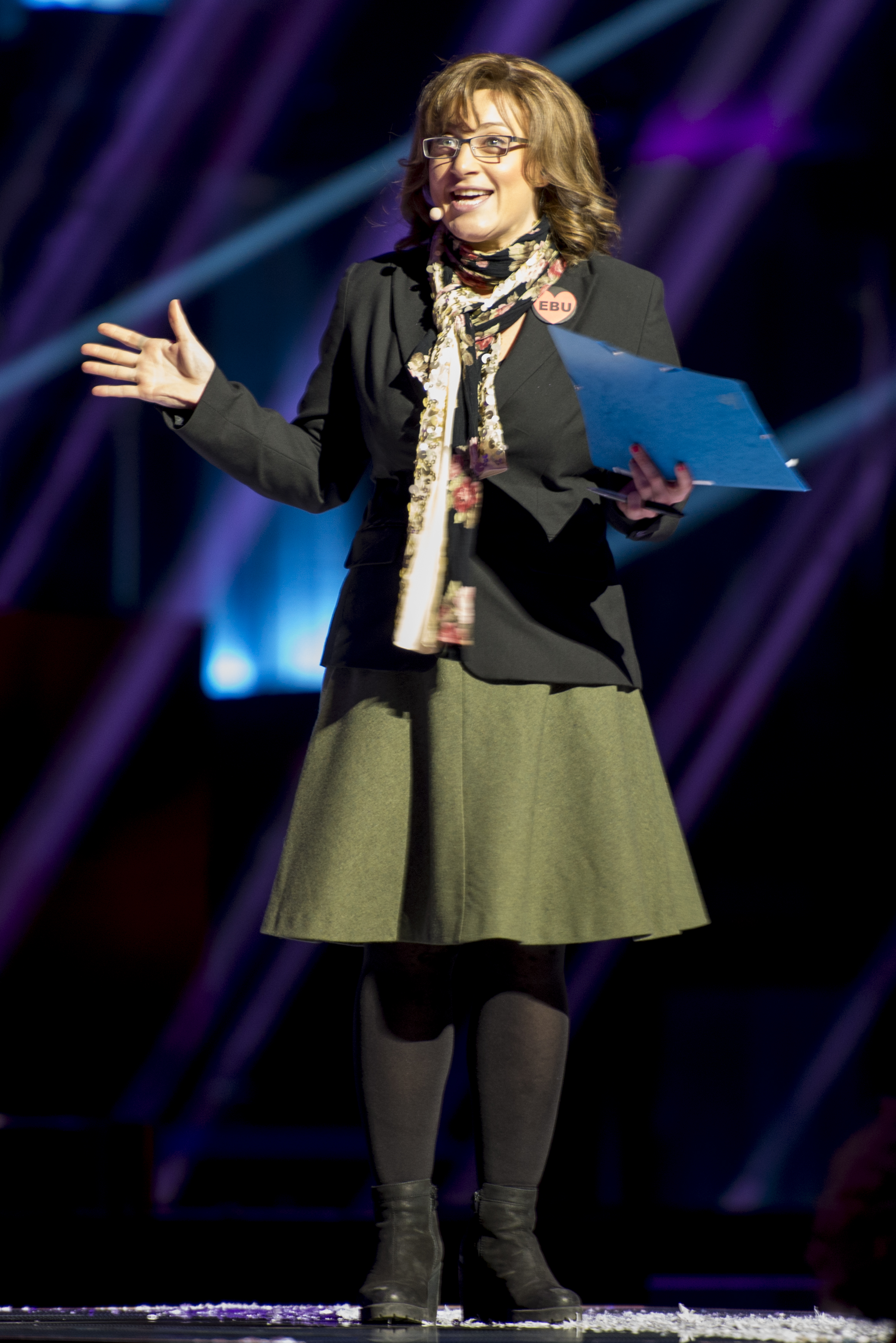
Finer as Lynda Woodruff in the Eurovision Song Contest 2016

- Finer entered Melodifestivalen 2007 with "I Remember Love", which she co-wrote with Peter Hallström. The song qualified to the final in Globen, Stockholm, from the fourth heat in Gävle. In the final, the song placed fourth and became a chart success in Sweden (most played song on Swedish radio in 2007), and was also certified gold.
- She competed in Melodifestivalen 2009 with "Moving On", which qualified to the final through the Second Chance round. Finer later presented the Swedish votes in that year's Eurovision Song Contest final on 16 May. "Moving On" was also released with remixes and an acoustic version. It was the most played song on Swedish radio in 2009.
- Finer hosted Melodifestivalen 2012 alongside Helena Bergström and Gina Dirawi. In a sketch recorded for the final, Finer played Lynda Woodruff, an English EBU spokeswoman. She reprised her role for a European audience when delivering Sweden's votes in the final of the Eurovision Song Contest 2012.
- Finer reprised her role as Woodruff in Melodifestivalen 2013, where she first introduced Stockholm as host city of the Eurovision Song Contest 2013 before being made aware of it being hosted in Malmö, where she then continued her sketch. Finer returned as Woodruff for Eurovision 2013 in a series of sketches introducing Sweden to viewers. She also appeared as herself in the final, performing "The Winner Takes It All", which she later released as a single.
- Finer was a commentator for Eurovision Song Contest's Greatest Hits alongside Christer Björkman on 4 April 2015. She also reprised her role as Woodruff for a sketch filmed in London in conjunction with the special.
- In the fourth semi-final of Melodifestivalen 2016, Finer was once again a host alongside Gina Dirawi. In the contest's final, she appeared in the interval act medley, singing her 2009 entry "Moving On", and also reprised her role as Woodruff in a sketch welcoming viewers to Stockholm, the host city of the Eurovision Song Contest 2016. She later returned as Woodruff for a live sketch at the Eurovision 2016 final.
- Finer co-hosted all six shows of Melodifestivalen 2019 alongside Eric Saade, Marika Carlsson and Kodjo Akolor.
- Finer co-hosted Sveriges 12:a, the Swedish replacement programme for the cancelled Eurovision Song Contest 2020, alongside Björkman.
- Finer reprised her role as Woodruff in the interval act of the second semi-final of the Eurovision Song Contest 2024 in Malmö, alongside Charlotte Perrelli, Käärijä and presenter Petra Mede. She also appeared as Woodruff in the final in a pre-recorded segment, performing a song about the contest's executive supervisor Martin Österdahl, "You're Good to Go", which was then released as a single.
- Finer appeared as the opening act of the fifth heat of Melodifestivalen 2026. She performed "Let Freedom Reign", a song written by co-presenter Hampus Nessvold and submitted to Melodifestivalen in the early 2010s but failed to make the cut. It samples the 1994 inauguration speech of then-South African president Nelson Mandela.

== Discography ==
=== Albums ===
Year	Album	Chart peak (SWE)	Certification
2007	A Finer Dawn	2	
2009	Moving On	1	
2010	Winterland	2	
2012	Sanningen kommer om natten	3	
2014	Vinterland	10	

=== EPs ===
Year	Album	Chart peak (SWE)	Certification
2005	Sarah Dawn Finer	–	

=== Singles ===
Year	Single	Chart peak (SWE)	Certification	Album
2007	"I Remember Love"	4		
2007	"Du som tog mitt hjärta" (with Patrik Isaksson)	45		
2009	"Moving On"	3		
2009	"Standing Strong"	36		
2010	"Kärleksvisan"	7		

Other non-charting

- 2007: "A Way Back to Love"
- 2007: "Stockholm by Morning"
- 2008: "Does She Know You"
- 2010: "I'll Be Your Wish Tonight"
- 2011: "Is Anybody There"

== Filmography ==
- 2021 - Sing 2 (Swedish version, voice)
- 2015 - Arne Dahl - En midsommarnattsdröm
- 2014 - Kärlek deluxe
- 2014 - The Pirate Fairy (Swedish version, voice)
- 2012 - The Lorax (Swedish version, voice)
- 2012 - Secret of the Wings (Swedish version, voice)
- 2011 - Hop (Swedish version, voice)
- 2009 - Så olika
- 2009 - The Princess and the Frog (Swedish version, voice)
- 2007 - Elias and the Royal Yacht (Swedish version, voice)
- 2001 - Pokémon 3: The Movie (Swedish version, voice)
- 1995 - Bert: The Last Virgin
- 1994 - Bert (TV series)
- 1989 - Maskrosbarn (TV movie)
