= Om sanningen ska fram =

Single by Eric Amarillo
- Released: 6 May 2011
- Recorded: 2011
- Genre: Pop, House
- Length: 3:11
- Label: EMI
- Songwriter(s): Eric Amarillo

Eric Amarillo singles chronology
"Music Will Turn You On" (2010)	"Om sanningen ska fram" (2011)

Music video
- "Om sanningen ska fram" on YouTube

"Om sanningen ska fram" (English: "If truth be told") is a song by Swedish musician, songwriter, music producer and DJ Eric Amarillo. The song was released on 6 May 2011 as a Digital download. The song reached number one on the Swedish Singles Chart.

== Music video ==
The music video for the song was uploaded to YouTube on April 27, 2011.

== Track listing ==
Digital download
No.	Title	Length
1.	"Om Sanningen Ska Fram"	3:11
2.	"Om Sanningen Ska Fram" (Clubedit Radio)	2:52
3.	"Om Sanningen Ska Fram" (Clubedit Extended)	5:00

== Charts ==
=== Weekly charts ===
Weekly chart performance for "Om sanningen ska fram"
Chart (2011)	Peak position
Denmark (Tracklisten)	7
Norway (VG-lista)	3
Sweden (Sverigetopplistan)	1

=== Year-end charts ===
Year-end chart performance for "Om sanningen ska fram"
Chart (2011)	Position
Swedish Singles (Sverigetopplistan)	27

== Certifications ==
Region	Certification	Certified units/sales
Denmark (IFPI Danmark)	Gold	15,000^{^}
Sweden (GLF)	2× Platinum	80,000^{‡}
^{^} Shipments figures based on certification alone.^{‡} Sales+streaming figures based on certification alone.
