= Samba Sambero (album) =

Studio album by Anna Book
- Released: 14 March 2007
- Genre: Latin pop, schlager
- Length: 46 minutes
- Label: Warner Music Sweden

Anna Book chronology
ABC (2006)	Samba Sambero (2007)

Samba Sambero is a 2007 studio album by Anna Book.

== Track listing ==
1. "Samba Sambero"
2. "Bara för en dag"
3. "Jag har sett en främling"
4. "Ven a bailar conmigo"
5. "Ain't That Just the Way"
6. "Lycklig och redo"
7. "Kom"
8. "Sway"
9. "Dansar med kärleken"
10. "Andalucia"
11. "Natural Woman"
12. "ABC"
13. "Killsnack"
14. "Det finns en morgondag"

== Charts ==
Chart (2007)	Peak position
Sweden (Sverigetopplistan)	38
