= Do What You're Told =

Single by Sebastian

from the album Sebastian
- Released: 1 February 2006 (Sweden)
- Recorded: 2006
- Genre: Alternative rock
- Label: Sony BMG/RCA
- Songwriters: Harris; Wallevik; Jakobsson
- Producer: Peter Kvint

Sebastian singles chronology
"Do What You're Told" (2006)	"Indifferent" (2006)

"Do What You're Told" is the debut single from Swedish pop/rock and alternative rock artist Sebastian, released from his debut album "Sebastian" on 1 February 2006. The song was written by Peter Wallevik, Mikael Jakobsson and Tina Harris. It was a hit on Swedish radio and successful in the Swedish charts, staying in the #1 position for four weeks.

The song was released three months after the Idol 2005 final, where Sebastian came in second place after Agnes Carlsson.

== Track list ==
1. "Do What You're Told" – 3:45
2. "Bring Me Some Water" – 4:09

== Charts ==
=== Weekly charts ===
Chart (2006)	Peak position
Sweden (Sverigetopplistan)	1

=== Year-end charts ===
Chart (2006)	Position
Sweden (Sverigetopplistan)	9
