= The Attic (band) =

Swedish musical group; house band duo

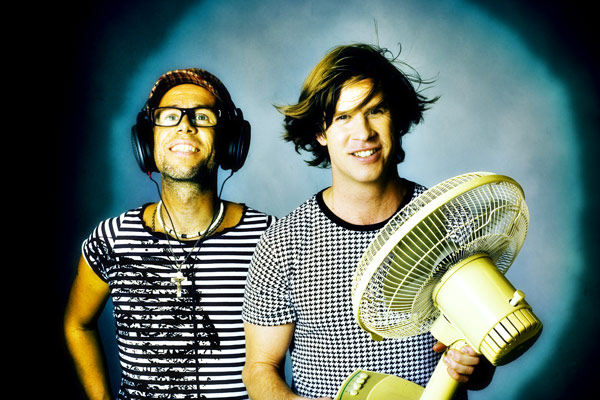

Background information
- Origin: Sweden
- Genres: House, dance music
- Years active: 2003–present
- Members: Eric Amarillo; Michael Feiner
- Website: www.theattic.se

The Attic is a Swedish house band duo whose members are Eric Amarillo (Erik Sundborg) and Michael Feiner that started under the name of Stereopol with the track 'Dancin' Tonight' in 2003. The two mostly perform house music songs of other artists, but they have also written their own songs.

They released a number of singles including "I Just Can't Help It", "Destiny", "In Your Eyes", "A Life To Live", "It's Beautiful" and "Baby". In 2006, they and Therese Grankvist recorded a song which they sent to Melodifestivalen; to their surprise the song was chosen to be performed in the festival. Therese, featuring The Attic, performed 'The Arrival' in the third semifinal, where they competed for the opportunity to represent Sweden in the Eurovision Song Contest 2007 in Helsinki, Finland. On 17 February 2007 The Attic ft Therese came 7th in the semifinal and didn't qualify any further in the contest.

The band played a concert in central Chişinău, Moldova organised by mobile operator Orange on 24 May 2008.

== Discography ==
=== Albums ===
- 2006: The One
- 2007: Remember Tomorrow

=== Singles ===
- "I Just Can't Help It" (#21 Sweden)
- "Destiny" (2004) (#92 United Kingdom)
- "In Your Eyes" (#32 Sweden)
- "A Life To Live"
- "It's Beautiful" (#57 Sweden)
- "Baby"
- "Human Rights"
- "Release Me" (feat Oh Laura)
- "Remember Tomorrow"
- "The Arrival" (The Attic feat Therese) (2007) (#10 Finland, #18 Sweden)
- "Flash In The Night" (2008) (#22 France)
- "Music Will Turn You On" (credited to Michael Feiner and Eric Amarillo) (2010)
