= Elin Lanto =

Swedish singer (born 1984)

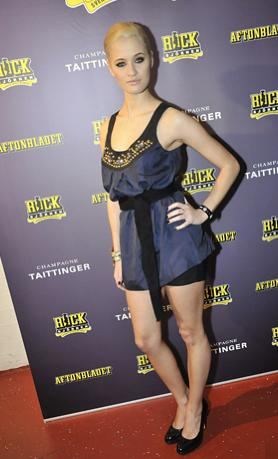
- Elin Lanto at the 2008 Rockbjörnen Awards

Background information
- Born: Elin Lanto; 22 July 1984 (age 42)
- Origin: Enköping, Sweden
- Genres: Pop, electropop, pop rock
- Occupation: Singer
- Years active: 2004–present
- Label: Catchy Tunes.
- Website: elinlanto.com

Elin Lanto (born 22 July 1984) is a Swedish singer who has had several hits in her home country, including the number one "I Won't Cry." Lanto came to further prominence after her performance of her song "Money" in Melodifestivalen 2007. She also took part in Melodifestivalen 2010 with "Doctor Doctor".

In 2009, Lanto made her US debut by releasing the single "Discotheque" on the American iTunes Store, also featuring a new remix by Jonas von de Burg. On 1 March 2009 "Discotheque" was featured on Showtime's The L Word.

== Early career ==
Lanto, from Enköping, signed as a vocalist with the Swedish indie Rodeo Records in 2001, while still in high school. In 2004 she became an overnight success in Sweden when her debut single, I Won't Cry, topped the chart on 22 October. This led to an article about her in Billboard magazine in November. Her first album, One, was produced by Lasse Anderson, the son of Stig Anderson, and appeared early in 2005.Her second Single "I Can Do It (Watch Me Now)" was written by Keith J. Hudson aka Truck Hudson and Lasse Anderson. In February 2005 she went on tour with Amy Diamond.

== Melodifestivalen ==
Lanto first participated in Melodifestivalen in 2007 with her single "Money" which later went on to achieve a placing of 16 on the Swedish charts.

Lanto participated for the second time in 2010 after a change in musical style. From 2004 to her 2007 entry Lanto performed pop music. From 2007 to 2009, she began experimenting with electronic/powerpop music which spawned such singles as the top ten hit "Speak 'n Spell". In the months before her Melodifestivalen 2010 performance she released "Love Made Me Stupid" which boasts a combination of pop rock music with dance/powerpop elements which was also the genre of her 2010 entry "Doctor Doctor". Lanto performed "Doctor Doctor" on 20 February 2010 in Scandinavium, Gothenburg. Her song came 7th out of 8 and was therefore eliminated from the competition. Following her Melodifestivalen performance, Lanto will release her second album Love Made Me Do It 3 May 2010 (digital release) and 5 May 2010 (physical release). Spiders Web, an electropop acoustic ballad will also be released as a single.

== Albums ==
- 2005 – One
- 2010 – Love Made Me Do It

== Singles ==
Year	Single	Album	Chart position
Year	Single	Album	SWE
2004	"I Won't Cry"	One	1
2005	"I Can Do It (Watch Me Now)"	One	4
2005	"We Fly"	One	56
2007	"Money"	Non-Album single	16
2008	"Speak 'n Spell" ^{1}	Love Made Me Do It	9
2008	"My Favourite Pair of Jeans"	Love Made Me Do It	35
2008	"Discotheque" ^{1}	Love Made Me Do It	16
2009	"Love Made Me Stupid"	Love Made Me Do It	—
2010	"Doctor Doctor"	Love Made Me Do It	26
2010	"Tickles"	Love Made Me Do It	—
2010	"Funeral"	Love Made Me Do It	—
2014	"Skylight"	Non-Album single	—
Number-one hits			1
Top ten hits			3

^{1} These singles were included as bonus tracks on some of the "Love Made Me Do It" releases
