= Anything But You =

Single by Stefan Andersson & Aleena Gibson
- A-side: "Anything But You"
- B-side: "Sailorman"
- Released: 7 February 2007
- Genre: folk
- Label: EMI Music Sweden
- Songwriter(s): Stefan Andersson, Aleena Gibson

"Anything But You" is a song written by Aleena Gibson and Stefan Andersson, and performed by Aleena Gibson and Stefan Andersson at Melodifestivalen 2007. Participating in the semifinal in Jönköping on 3 February 2007, it ended up 5th, which meant the song was knocked out of contest.

Released as a single on 7 February 2007, it peaked at 40th position at the Swedish singles chart. The song was also tested at Svensktoppen, entering the chart on 4 March 2007 placing on 10th position. The upcoming week, the song had been knocked out of chart.

== Single track listing ==
1. Anything But You
2. Sailorman

== Charts ==
Chart (2007)	Peak position
Sweden (Sverigetopplistan)	40
