= Vinterland (album) =

Studio album by Sarah Dawn Finer
- Released: 13 November 2014
- Genre: Christmas, gospel
- Label: Roxy
- Producer: Jesper Nordenström

Sarah Dawn Finer chronology
Sanningen kommer om natten (2012)	Vinterland (2014)

Vinterland is the fifth studio by Swedish singer Sarah Dawn Finer. It was released on 13 November 2014. The album has been described as a "winter's album", and consists of many Christmas songs, just like the album Winterland which Sarah Dawn Finer released in 2010.

== Track listing ==
1. Vinterland
2. Kanske nästa år
3. Jag tror det blir snö i natt
4. Håll mitt hjärta (duet with Samuel Ljungbladh)
5. Vinter (a translation of Tori Amos's Winter with personalised lyrics)
6. Ännu en jul
7. Från November till April
8. Valborg
9. Vintersaga
10. Jul, jul, strålande jul (duet with Stephen Simmonds)
11. Nyårslöfte
12. Sancta Lucia (Strålande helgonfé), duet with Malena Ernman)

== Charts ==
Chart (2014)	Peak position
Swedish Albums (Sverigetopplistan)	10
