= A Finer Dawn =

Studio album by Sarah Dawn Finer
- Released: May 31, 2007
- Genre: gospel, soul
- Length: 45 minutes
- Label: King Island Roxystar Recordings

Sarah Dawn Finer chronology
A Finer Dawn (2007)	Moving On (2009)

A Finer Dawn is the debut studio album by Swedish singer Sarah Dawn Finer, released in 2007.

== Track listing ==
1. "Come On"
2. "A Way Back to Love"
3. "You Were Meant for Me"
4. "I Remember Love"
5. "Out of the Darkness"
6. "Some Kind of Peace"
7. "I'll Be Ok"
8. "Wanna Try"
9. "It Feels So Good"
10. "Stockholm by Morning"
11. "Stay"
12. "Home"

== Charts ==
Chart (2007)	Peak position
Swedish Albums (Sverigetopplistan)	2
