= Winterland (disambiguation) =

Winterland (demolished 1985) was a former ice skating rink and 5,400 seat music venue in San Francisco, California.

Winterland may also refer to:

- Winterland, Newfoundland and Labrador, settlement in Canada

== Entertainment ==
- Winterland (The Jimi Hendrix Experience album), 2011
- Winterland (Sarah Dawn Finer album), 2010
- Winterland, San Francisco, CA, 12/31/77, a 2009 album by the New Riders of the Purple Sage
- Winterland, a 1998 album by Emma Townshend
- "Winterland" (Journeyman), the eighth episode of the first season of Journeyman
- "Winterland", a song by the German rock band Unheilig

== See also ==
- Summerland (disambiguation)
