= Cosmo4 =

Swedish girl group

- Origin: Sweden
- Genres: Europop; bubblegum pop
- Years active: 2004-2008
- Label: Lionheart International
- Past members: Lisa Stadell (2004-2005); Johanna (2004-2005); Yasmine Qin (2004-2008); Jenny Rogneby (2004-2008); Ulrika Liljeroth (2005-2008); Carin da Silva (2005-2006); Rudina Hatipi (2007-2008)

Cosmo4 is a Swedish girl group consisting of four members: Yasmine Qin, Ulrika Liljeroth, Jenny Rogneby, and Rudina Hatipi.

The group released two successful singles since 2006. Previously, Carin da Silva was a member of the group until late 2006, when Carin left to concentrate on her studies and Rudina replaced her. Before that, Cosmo4's other previous members are named Lisa and Johanna, who were only a part of Cosmo4 in 2004 with their debut single "Mexico". The four hail from different parts of the world. Yasmine is from China, Jenny was born in Ethiopia, Rudina is from Kosovo and Ulrika is from Sweden; all of the group live in Sweden.

== Career ==
The group participated in the Swedish Melodifestivalen 2007 second semifinal with the song "What's Your Name" to compete for the chance to represent Sweden in the Eurovision Song Contest in Finland. On 10 February, Cosmo4 was in the top five of Melodifestivalen 2007; in the final round of voting, the group placed fifth and was voted off of the contest. Despite this, their Melodifestivalen entry became a hit and it was played on Swedish commercial radio. Later on, Cosmo4 said in a newspaper that they will try again for Melodifestivalen 2009.

In 2007, Cosmo4 announced the release of their first album with hits such as Peek-a-Boo, Adios Amigos, and their Melodifestivalen entry, What's Your Name. Their debut album, "Around The World", was scheduled to release in 2007 first in Russia under their Russian label Style Records.

In October, RobPop of Don't Stop The Pop reviewed a promo copy of this album and revealed the full 12 track line-up, however, the album never made it to shelves in Europe or on iTunes as planned by Lionheart. An interview with Ulrika later confirmed that Cosmo4 had disbanded and the reason for the album's cancellation was simply due to the fact they didn't feel the demand for an album was big enough.

In 2008, however, their Thai publisher, Red Beat, began publishing a number of Cosmo4's album songs onto compilations, some of which are still available for purchase today on ethaicd and other various Thailand CD sites, which led to many songs such as "Vida Loca" and "Shop Shop" making it to YouTube. Despite the cancellations in Europe, it has been said that Red Beat went ahead with a small release of "Around The World" within Thailand during 2008. A cover of their single “Peek-A-Boo” was used for a commercial for Mattel’s Barbie Peek-a-boo Petites dolls.

== Singles ==
Year	Title	Chart positions
Year	Title	SWE
2004	Mexico	19
2006	Peek-A-Boo	29
2006	Adios Amigos	5
2007	What's Your Name?	12

== Album ==
- Around The World (2007)

== Track listing ==
1. "What's Your Name?"
2. "Peek-A-Boo"
3. "A Girl's Gotta Do (What A Girl's Gotta Do)"
4. "I Think We're Alone Now" (Ritchie Cordell)
5. "Shop Shop"
6. "Adios Amigos"
7. "Vida Loca"
8. "Mexico"
9. "Poor Romeo"
10. "What's Not To Like"
11. "Whats Your Name (Holter Remix)"
12. "Peek-a-Boo (Soundfactory Club Mix)

(This is not the confirmed track listing from the Russian Record company)
