= Trying to Recall (album) =

Studio album by Marie Lindberg
- Released: 21 March 2007
- Recorded: Sidelake and Monitor Studios
- Genre: acoustic, pop
- Length: 34 minutes
- Label: MEG
- Producer: Patrik Frisk

Trying to Recall was released on 21 March 2007, and is a studio album by Marie Lindberg. and her debut album.

== Track listing ==
1. Leona (under Her Skin)
2. Blame it on Fate
3. Trying to Recall
4. Bound to Die
5. This Time
6. Seize the Day
7. Why Can't We Kiss
8. All that I am
9. Suppose I Don't Love You
10. Revolt
11. Whatever will Happen

== Contributors ==
- Marie Lindberg - song, composer, song lyrics
- Patrik Frisk - keyboards, bass, producer
- Andreas Edin - guitar
- Chris Rehn - guitar
- Kristian Thuresson - guitar
- Jan Robertsson - drums

== Charts ==
=== Weekly charts ===
Chart (2007)	Peak position
Swedish Albums (Sverigetopplistan)	1

=== Year-end charts ===
Chart (2007)	Position
Swedish Albums (Sverigetopplistan)	61
