= Amanda (Jimmy Jansson song) =

Single by Jimmy Jansson

from the album Sån e jag
- Released: 5 March 2007
- Genre: pop
- Length: M&L Records
- Songwriter(s): Thomas G:son and Jimmy Jansson

Jimmy Jansson singles chronology
"Vi kan gunga" (2005)	"Amanda" (2007)	"För din skull" (2009)

"Amanda" is an uptempo song written by Thomas G:son and Jimmy Jansson, and performed by Jimmy Jansson at Melodifestivalen 2007. The song participated in the competition inside Scandinavium on 10 February 2007, and went further to Andra chansen, but failed to reach the final inside the Stockholm Globe Arena. The song was originally written for Melodifestivalen 2004, but was rejected, which happened again when applying for Melodifestivalen 2005 and 2006.

== Single ==
Released as a single on 5 March 2007, it peaked at third position at the Swedish singles chart. A 22 April 2007 attempt to also enter Svensktoppen, however, failed.

== Track listing ==
1. Amanda
2. Vild & vacker
3. Amanda (singback)

== Charts ==
Chart (2007)	Peak position
Sweden (Sverigetopplistan)	3

== Other recording ==
Spanish group D'NASH recorded the song with lyrics in Spanish, and released it as a single in 2007.
