= Emilè Azar =

Swedish singer

Emilè Azar (born in Beirut, Lebanon on 2 May 1985) is a Swedish singer of Lebanese origin, and a resident of Sandviken, Sweden. He sent in a song to Melodifestivalen and got a spot on the show in a bid to represent Sweden in the Eurovision Song Contest 2007, receiving media attention because of his massive weight loss after getting a spot in Melodifestivalen.

On 24 February 2007, Emilé Azar performed the song "Vi hade nåt" (meaning We had something) in Melodifestivalen 2007 and ended up in 7th place and did not make it any further in the contest.

== Discography ==
- 2007: "Vi hade nåt" (in Melodifestivalen 2007
