= Money (Elin Lanto song) =

Single by Elin Lanto
- A-side: "Money" (original version)
- B-side: "Money" (karaoke version)
- Released: March 2007
- Genre: pop
- Label: Rodeo Recordings
- Songwriter(s): Lasse Anderson

Elin Lanto singles chronology
"We Fly" (2006)	"Money" (2007)	"Speak 'n Spell" (2008)

"Money" is a song written by Lasse Anderson and performed by Elin Lanto at Melodifestivalen 2007. The song participated in the semifinal in Jönköping before reaching Andra chansen, where it was knocked out of the contest. The single peaked at 16th position at the Swedish singles chart. On 1 April 2007, the song was tested for Svensktoppen., but failed.

== Charts ==
Chart (2007)	Peak position
Sweden (Sverigetopplistan)	16
