= Catch the Moon (song) =

Single by Stefan Andersson

from the album Emperor's Day
- A-side: "Catch the Moon"
- B-side: "Again"
- Released: 1992
- Genre: pop
- Label: The Record Station
- Songwriter: Stefan Andersson

"Catch the Moon" is a song written and recorded by Stefan Andersson for his 1992 debut album Emperor's Day. It was released as a single and become the third most successful Trackslistan hit of 1992.

In May 2005, a live version was recorded inside the Annedal Church and released on Andersson's album En främlings hus.

== Charts ==
Chart (1992)	Peak position
Sweden (Sverigetopplistan)	4
