= The Most Beautiful Lie =

Studio album by Sebastian Karlsson
- Released: January 21, 2009
- Length: 43:00
- Label: Roxy Recordings
- Producer: Ronald Bood

Sebastian Karlsson chronology
The Vintage Virgin (2007)	The Most Beautiful Lie (2009)	No Red Line (2012)

Singles from The Most Beautiful Lie
- 1. "My Getaway" Released: 2008; 2. "Serial Lovers" Released: 2009

The Most Beautiful Lie is the third album by Sebastian Karlsson.

== Track listing ==
1. "Stay Forever" 3:57
2. "Serial Lovers" 3:54
3. "Up Up High" 3:36
4. "My Baby Fears No One" 3:41
5. "Cross My Heart" 3:55
6. "Come On (Bring Out the Love)" 4:28
7. "Wake Up Where Your Heart Is" 3:17
8. "Love Them All" 3:17
9. "Keep Your Head Up Love" 3:51
10. "Come As You Are" 4:21
11. "My Getaway" 4:29

Tracks 1, 2, 4, 5, 6, 7, 8, 10 & 11 written by Sebastian Karlsson and Peter Kvint. Track 3 & 9 written by Sebastian Karlsson

== Charts ==
Chart (2009)	Peak position
Sweden (Sverigetopplistan)	32
