= I år är julen min =

Studio album by Tommy Nilsson
- Released: 3 November 2010
- Genre: Christmas, soft rock
- Length: 50 minutes
- Label: EMI Music Sweden
- Producer: Lasse Englund

Tommy Nilsson chronology
Tiden före nu (2005)	I år är julen min (2010)	Stay Straight on the Current Road (2013)

I år är julen min is a Christmas album by Tommy Nilsson, released on 3 November 2010.

== Track listing ==
1. Nu tändas tusen juleljus (Emmy Köhler)
2. I år är julen min (Tommy Nilsson)
3. Välkommen hem (Tommy Nilsson)
4. När det lider mot jul (Ruben Liljefors, Jeanna Oterdahl)
5. Tomtarnas julnatt (Wilhelm Sefve-Svensson, Alfred Smedberg)
6. Knalle juls vals (Evert Taube)
7. Låt mig få tända ett ljus (Schlaf, mein Prinzchen, schlaf ein) (Bernhard Flies, Börje Carlsson)
8. Jul, jul, strålande jul (Gustav Nordqvist, Edvard Evers)
9. Silver på mitt fönster (Paul Buchanan, Ulf Schagerström)
10. Stilla natt (Stille Nacht, heilige Nacht), with Henning Kvitnes (Franz Gruber, Oscar Mannström, Edvard Evers, Torsten Fogelkvist)
11. Julen är just i natt (Robbie Robertson, Ulf Schagerström)
12. Betlehems stjärna (Alice Tegnér, Viktor Rydberg)
13. Januari skrattar (Lasse Englund, Marie Bergman)
14. Ring den nya tiden in (Tommy Nilsson)

== Contributors ==
- Tommy Nilsson - singer
- Lasse Englund - guitar, mandolin, banjo, dobro, producer
- Björn Lundquist - bass
- Kjell Gustafsson - drums, percussion
- Sven Gunnar Pettersson - piano
- Rikard Nilsson - organ
- Joakim Milder - recorder
- Stockholm Strings - musicians
