= MissMatch =

Swedish band

MissMatch is a Swedish electronica band consisting of Carin Ekroth and Emma Göransson. The group received increased exposure in 2007 when they entered the Melodifestivalen 2007 with the song "Drop Dead". This single reached number 21 on the Sverigetopplistan chart. Shortly after the contest they released their debut album Just Push Play. Single number two from the duo is the upbeat pop Balad "Breathe in/Breathe out" and it was released in Sweden on September 7. This single reached number 12 on the Sverigetopplistan chart.
