= Michael Feiner =

Michael Feiner born in Gothenburg, Sweden in 1971, is a musician, songwriter, music producer, multi-instrumentalist and DJ. He is member of the Swedish house band duo The Attic formed in 2003 alongside his childhood friend Eric Amarillo. The duo as The Attic alongside Therese Grankvist took part in Melodifestivalen 2007 with "The Arrival".

A successful singer and songwriter, he has also developed a solo career and has had many collaborations with established artists and is the voice behind a number of big dance floor hits such as "Together" with Axwell & Sebastian Ingrosso, "Fairplay (Let There Be Love)" with Markus Gardeweg featuring Michael Feiner, "In Your Eyes" and "Flash In The Night" with his own band The Attic.

== Discography ==
For discography with his band, see The Attic

=== Singles / Releases ===
- 2006: "Midsummer"
- 2006: "Folka"
- 2009: "Fairplay (Let There Be Love)" (credited to Markus Gardeweg feat. Michael Feiner)
- 2009: "Peace"
- 2009: "Must Be the Music"
- 2010: "Music Will Turn You On" (credited to Michael Feiner and Eric Amarillo)
- 2010: "Free" / "Party People (credited to Michael Feiner and Eric Amarillo)

Tracks and collaborations

- 2005: "Together" (credited to Axwell and Sebastian Ingrosso feat. Michael Feiner)
- 2006: "I Need a House (Michael Feiner mix)" by Marie Serneholt
- 2008: "Rise and Shine" (credited to Michael Mind feat. Michael Feiner)
- 2008: "All On You" by Danny Saucedo (written by Michael Feiner and Eric Amarillo)
- 2008: "Saturday Night" (credited to Michael Feiner feat. Daniel Lindström)
- 2009: "Don't Let Me Down" (credited to Eddie Thoneick feat. Michael Feiner, from the compilation Ministry of Sound Sessions Six)
- 2009: "Pangea" / "Better Ways" (credited to Albin Myers feat. Michael Feiner)
- 2009: "Stars" (credited to DBN vs. Tommy Trash feat. Michael Feiner)
- 2011: "The Days to Come" (credited to Arias and Arno Cost feat. Michael Feiner)
- 2014: "We Will Recover" (credited to Kaaze & Michael Feiner)
- 2016: "Mantra" (Axwell Cut)
