= Sebastian (album) =

Studio album by Sebastian
- Released: March 1, 2006
- Recorded: 2005–2006
- Genre: Pop/rock, alternative rock
- Label: RCA; Sony BMG Music Entertainment

Sebastian chronology
Sebastian (2006)	The Vintage Virgin (2007)

Sebastian (2006) is the first album by the Swedish pop/rock singer Sebastian Karlsson, including the first single and four weeks at No. 1 hit, "Do What You're Told". The album was released on March 1, debuting at No. 1 in Sweden, and not falling until a few weeks thereafter. More than 30,000 copies of the album have been sold, certificating gold the album.

== Track listing ==
1. Indifferent
2. Bring Me Some Water
3. Do What You're Told
4. Life On Mars
5. Birthmarks
6. This House Is Not For Sale (Ryan Adams)
7. Stay Real
8. Start Me Up
9. Human
10. Diamond

== Singles from the album ==
- "Do What You're Told" - released February 1, 2006 (No. 1 for 4 weeks)
- "Indifferent" - released April 26, 2006 (No. 38)
- "Bring Me Some Water" (promotional)
