= Linda Olsson (actress) =

Swedish musical artist, dancer and actress

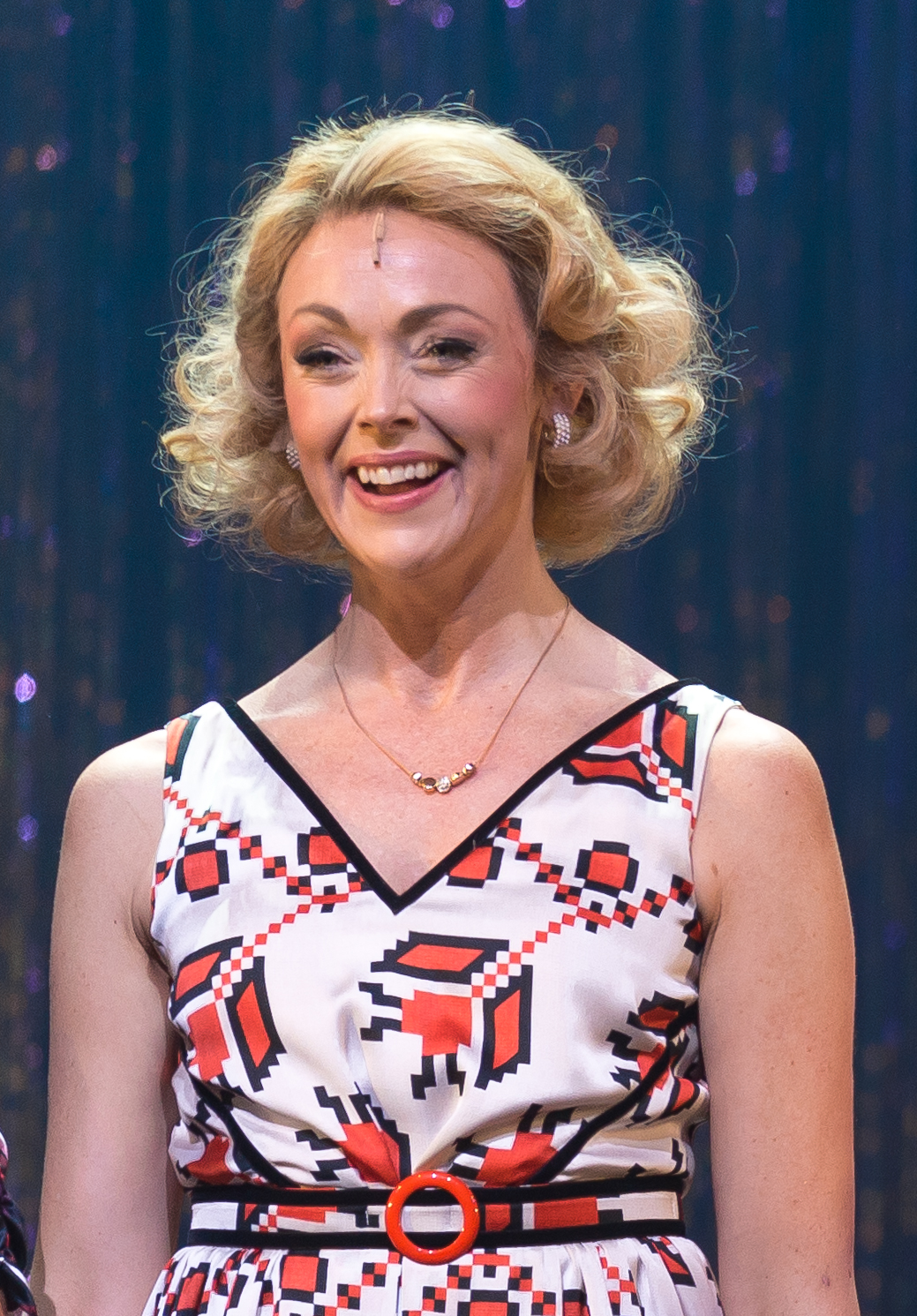
Olsson as Jane Smart in the musical Witches of Eastwick at Cirkus in 2019

Linda Olsson (born 8 August 1979) is a Swedish musical artist, dancer and actress.

== Biography ==
Linda Olsson grew up in a family of doctors in Lindö, Norrköping Municipality, She studied at Långtorpsskolan and later at Navestadsskolans music classes, and later studied music at De Geergymnasiet. She has also studied dance at Lagers dansinstitut in Norrköping. She won gold in Latin American dance and a Swedish championship silver in bug dancing. She has also studied ballet at Balettakademin in Gothenburg.

She got her big breakthrough as the lead role in the musical Mary Poppins in 2008 at Göteborgsoperan. She has also acted in Grease, A Chorus Line and Kiss Me Kate. She acted in Rivierans guldgossar at Cirkus in Stockholm in 2007. And in The Producers - Det våras för Hitler in 2010 at Galateatern. She has also appeared in musicals Sweeney Todd and Chicago. She also had a role in the very first ABBA music fest Mamma Mia! The Party at Tyrol in 2016. Olsson played the lead role as Dale Tremont in Top Hat at Malmö Opera in 2015.

Since 2017, she has been married to singer Tommy Nilsson. They have a son.
