= Viktor Åkerblom Nilsson =

Swedish actor and television presenter

Viktor Åkberblom
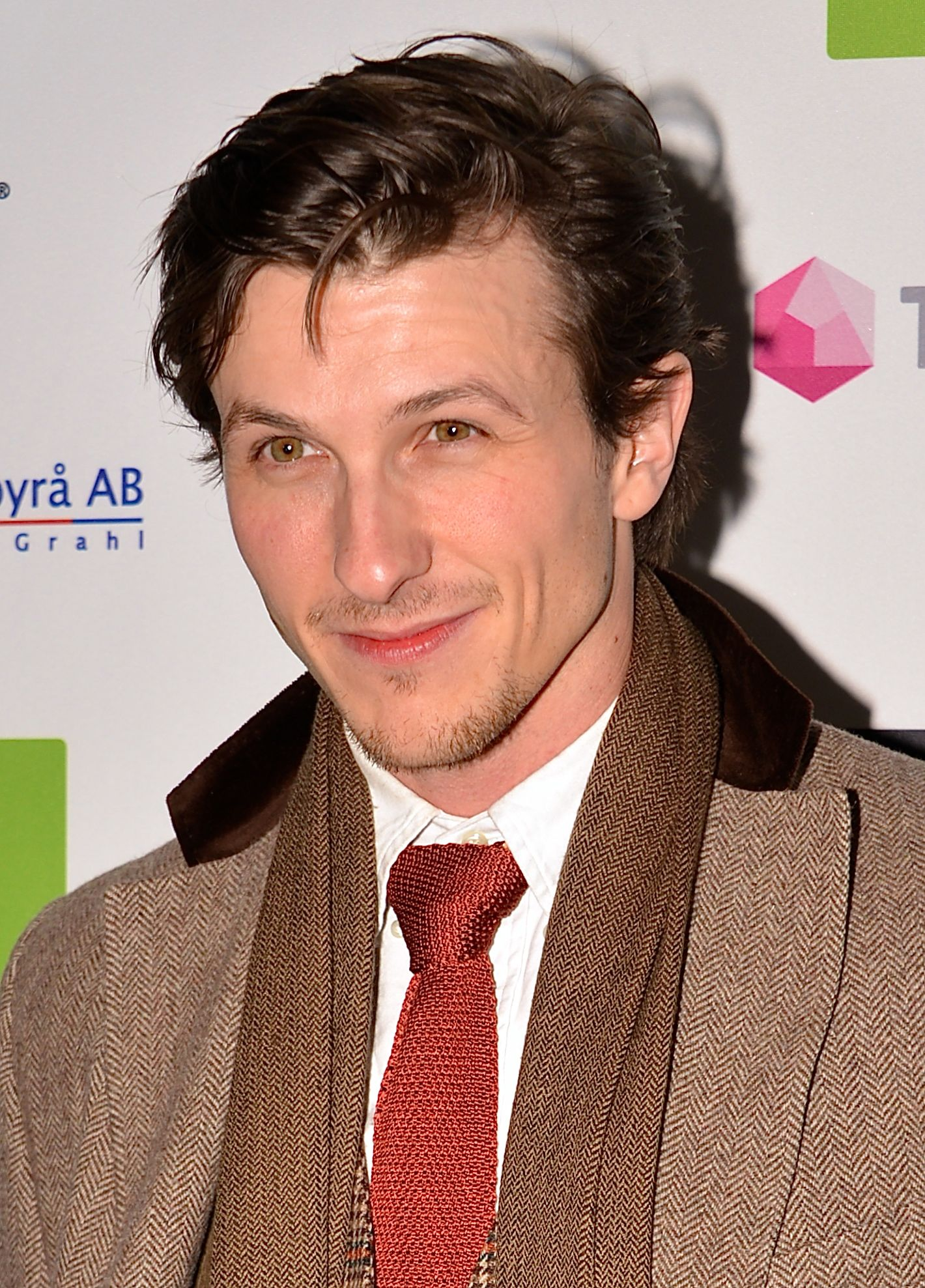
- Viktor Åkerblom (2013)
- Born: 31 January 1981 (age 45); Söderköping, Sweden
- Occupations: Television presenter, Actor

Viktor Åkerblom (born 31 January 1981) is a Swedish actor and television presenter. He acted in the TV series Hotell Seger which was broadcast on Kanal 5 in 2001. In March 2004, he started presenting the children's show Bolibompa on SVT. In 2006, he placed third in the celebrity dance series Let's Dance on TV4; he teamed up with dancer Carin da Silva.

He participated in the Findus television commercial as the chef Oliver in the same year. He has also presented the horse trot programs Viktors vänner and Vinnare V64 broadcast on TV4.

He has also acted with the Riksteatern in the play Svirr och snurr och sommargung; he played Aladdin in the play Aladdin och den magiska lampan at Hamburger Börs in 2010 through 2011. He played Elake Måns in Intimans about Pelle Svanslös in 2008.
