= I Won't Cry =

Single by Elin Lanto
- A-side: "I Won't Cry"
- Released: 2004 (Sweden)
- Label: Rodeo
- Songwriter: Lasse Anderson

Elin Lanto singles chronology
"I Won't Cry" (2004)	"I Can Do It (Watch Me Now)" (2005)

"I Won't Cry" is a song written by Lasse Anderson, and recorded by Elin Lanto. It was released in 2004. as her debut single, it topped the Swedish singles chart.

== Other recordings ==
In 2008, the song was recorded by Emilia Rydberg.

== Track listing ==
1. "I Won't Cry"
2. "I Won't Cry" (CHR-remix)
3. "I Won't Cry" (karaokeversion)

== Charts ==
=== Weekly charts ===
Chart (2004–2005)	Peak position
Sweden (Sverigetopplistan)	1

=== Year-end charts ===
Chart (2004)	Position
Sweden (Sverigetopplistan)	10
Chart (2005)	Position
Sweden (Sverigetopplistan)	80
