= Marie Lindberg (singer) =

Musical artist

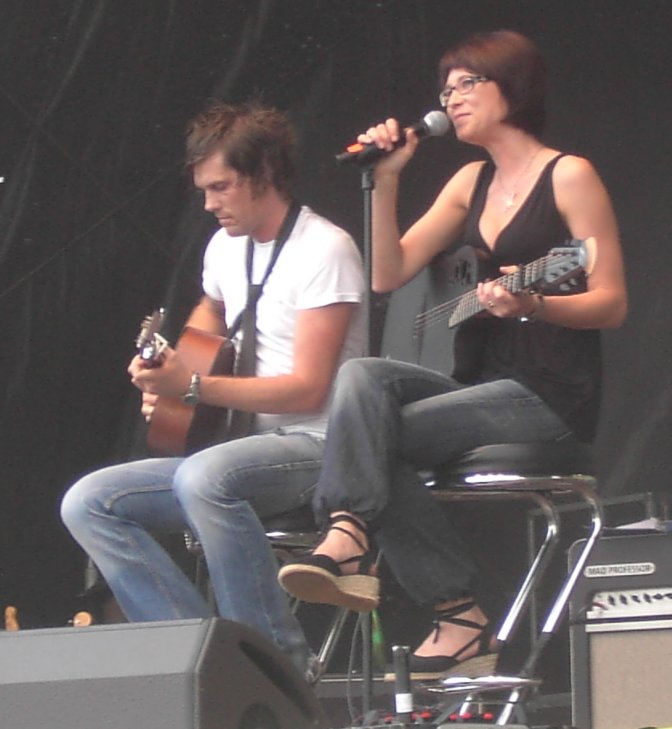
- Marie Lindberg (right) in August 2007

Background information
- Born: 3 May 1975 (age 51)
- Origin: Kungshamn, Sweden
- Genres: Soul
- Occupations: Singer, Teacher

Marie Lindberg (born 3 May 1975 in Kungshamn, Sweden) is a Swedish schoolteacher, singer/songwriter and guitarist. She competed in the Swedish Melodifestivalen 2007 after sending in a song to the contest for fun. In Gothenburg on 10 February 2007, Lindberg, performing Trying to Recall, was the second artist named as a finalist in Melodifestivalen 2007.

Marie Lindberg's entry Trying to Recall was written and composed by her in May 1998. However, she was not confident enough in order to put the song forward in Melodifestivalen 2007. She received positive reviews from the Swedish media and continued easily from the second semifinal of Melodifestivalen 2007. She was the only non-professional artist and unknown act in the second semifinal, where Lindberg and The Ark received the most votes and went through directly to the final.

The song Trying to Recall placed fifth at the Melodifestivalen 2007 final, not receiving more than four points from the judges but 66 points from the viewers' votes.

On 30 March 2007 Marie Lindberg's debut album, "Trying to Recall" went straight into No.1 on Svensktoppen, the Swedish music charts.

== Discography ==
=== Albums ===
- 2007 - Trying to Recall

=== Singles ===
Title	Year	Peak chart positions	Album
Title	Year	SWE	Album
"Trying to Recall"	2007	-	Trying to Recall
SWE			Trying to Recall
"Leona (Under Her Skin)"	2007	-	Trying to Recall
