= Värmlandstoppen =

Swedish radio program

Värmlandstoppen is a Swedish radio program on Swedish Radio Värmland.

Local artists and groups are involved in the Värmlandstoppen hit list, and must have their own produced material. Värmlandstoppen often assists musicians in getting record deals. .

Värmlandstoppen premiered in February 1986. It was cancelled around 1996, then re-launched in January 2005.

== Sources ==
- https://web.archive.org/web/20070930225048/http://www.sr.se/cgi-bin/varmland/program/artikel.asp?ProgramID=2189&Artikel=775302
- sv:Värmlandstoppen
