= Eric Amarillo =

Swedish musician and DJ

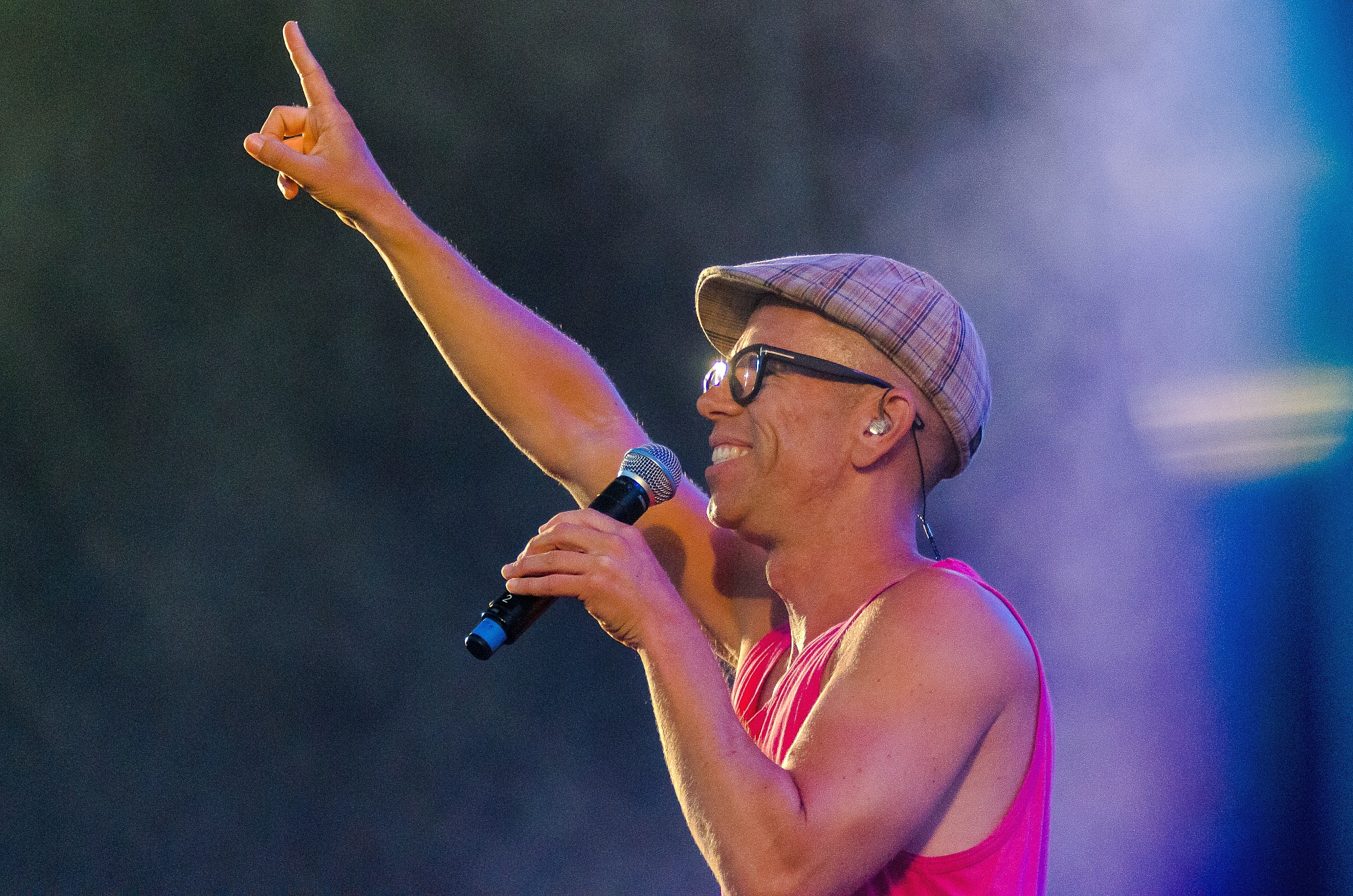
Amarillo at RixFM Festival 2011 in Växjö.

Erik Sundborg better known by his stage name Eric Amarillo born in Kullavik south of Gothenburg, Sweden in 1971, is a musician, songwriter, music producer and DJ.

He is member of the Swedish house band duo The Attic, formed in 2003, alongside his childhood friend Michael Feiner.

In Spring 2011 he released a solo single on EMI label titled "Om sanningen ska fram" (meaning "If truth be told" in English) that reached the top of the Swedish Singles Chart on the chart dated 20 May 2011. The song also charted in Norway and Denmark, peaking at number three and seven, respectively.

== Discography ==
For discography with his band, see The Attic

=== Albums ===
Album Title	Album details	Peak chart positions
Album Title	Album details	SWE
Eric Amarillo	Released: 21 October 2011; Label: Starbuster; Format: CD, Digital download	16

=== Singles ===
Year	Single	Peak chart position			Album
Year	Single	SWE	DEN	NOR	Album
2010	"Music Will Turn You On" (credited to Michael Feiner and Eric Amarillo)	—	—	—	Non-Album single
2011	"Om sanningen ska fram"	1	7	3	Eric Amarillo
2011	"50 kvm"	—	—	—	Eric Amarillo
2011	"Fy Fan"	—	—	—	Eric Amarillo
2011	"Men hallå!"	—	34	—	
