= Samba Sambero =

Single by Anna Book

from the album Samba Sambero
- A-side: "Samba Sambero"
- B-side: "Samba Sambero" (singback version)
- Released: 5 March 2007
- Genre: pop, schlager
- Label: M&L Records
- Songwriter: Thomas G:son

Anna Book singles chronology
"Andalucia" (2006)	"Samba Sambero" (2007)

"Samba Sambero" is a song written by Thomas G:son and performed by Anna Book at Melodifestivalen 2007. The song participated in the semifinal inside the Kinnarps Arena in Jönköping on 3 February 2007, and headed directly for final inside the Stockholm Globe Arena on 10 March 2007, ending up on the 9th place. On 5 March 2007 the single was released, peaking at number 15 on the Swedish singles chart.

The song also charted at Svensktoppen, entering on 8 April 2007 ending up at the 10th position. The upcoming week, the song had been knocked out.

== Track listing ==
1. Samba Sambero (original version)
2. Samba Sambero (singback version)

== Charts ==
Chart (2007)	Peak position
Sweden (Sverigetopplistan	15
