= Jag tror på människan =

Single by Tommy Nilsson
- A-side: "Jag tror på människan"
- B-side: "Jag tror på människan" (instrumental version)
- Released: 4 March 2007
- Genre: rock
- Label: Sony BMG Music Entertainment
- Songwriters: Johan Stentorp, Lasse Andersson, Tommy Nilsson

Tommy Nilsson singles chronology
"Vi brann" (2006)	"Jag tror på människan" (2007)

"Jag tror på människan" is a rock ballad written by Johan Stentorp, Lasse Andersson and Tommy Nilsson, and performed by Tommy Nilsson at Melodifestivalen 2007. The song participated in the semifinal at the Kinnarps Arena in the town of Jönköping, Sweden, on 3 February 2007, where it advanced directly to the finals at the Stockholm Globe Arena on 10 March 2007, where it ended up in 10th place, without earning any points. Tommy Nilsson referred to this result as a "shutout" at the Stockholm Globe Arena. His previous appearance at melodifestivalen was also at the Stockholm Globe Arena, where his song "En dag" won the contest in 1989.

The song charted at Svensktoppen for one week, entering the chart on 25 March 2007. It peaked at 9th place before getting knocked off the chart the upcoming week.

The song's lyrics describe what mankind can do together for the good of humanity and the planet, in a future with threats like wars and global warming.

== Single ==
On 4 March 2007, the single was released and peaked at 12th place on the Swedish singles chart.

== Track listing ==
1. Jag tror på människan
2. Jag tror på människan (instrumental)

== Charts ==
Chart (2007)	Peak position
Sweden (Sverigetopplistan)	12
