= Carin da Silva =

Swedish singer, dancer and television presenter

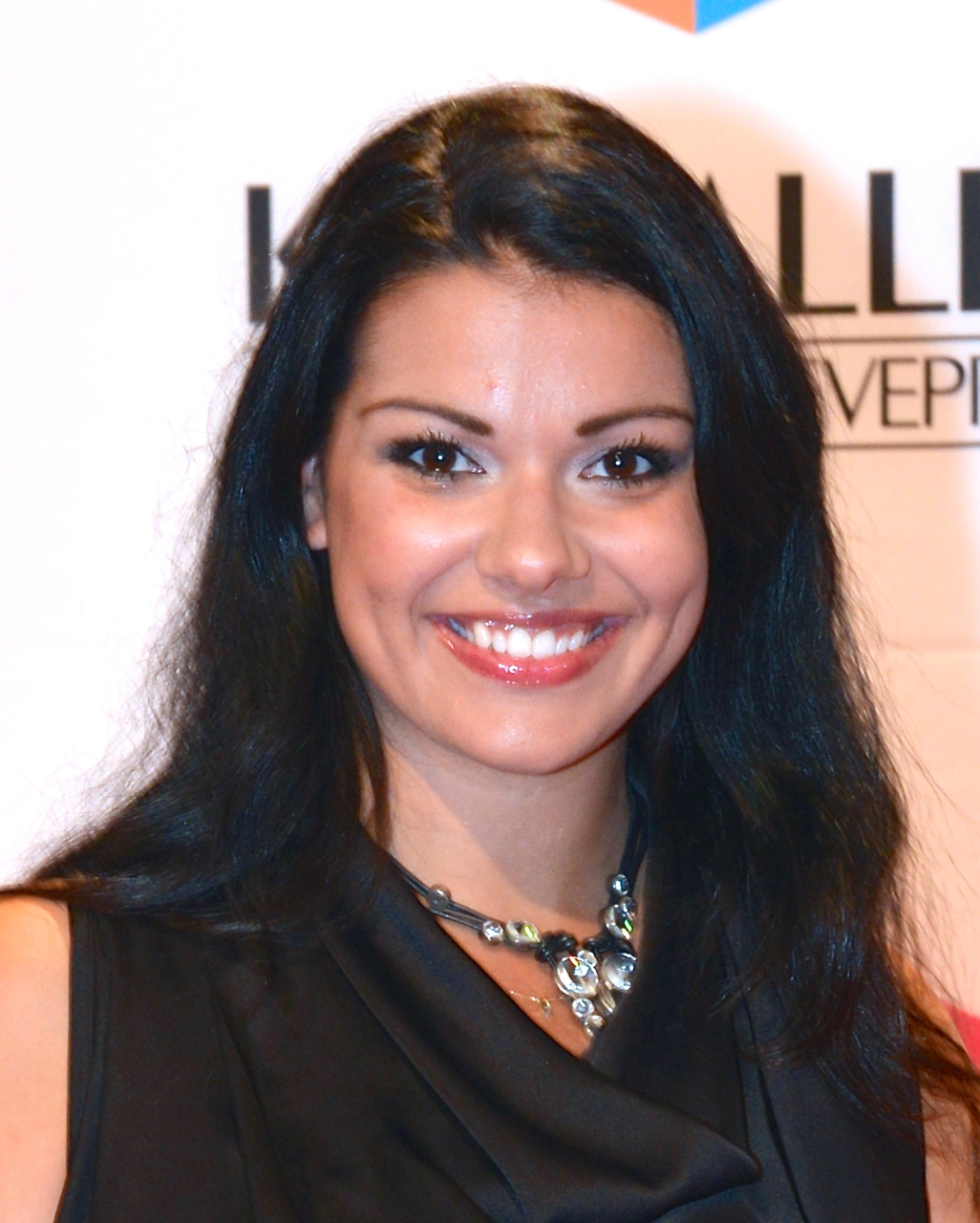
- Carin da Silva (2013)
- Born: 16 November 1984 (age 41); Luleå, Sweden
- Occupations: Television presenter, Dancer
- Known for: Let's Dance

Carin Elisa da Silva (born 16 November 1984) is a Swedish-Portuguese singer, professional dancer and television presenter.

== Biography ==
Carin da Silva is a three-times Swedish junior champion in Latin American dance, standard dance, and ballroom dancing. She represented Sweden both in the European and World Championships in dancing. She studied at Kongahällagymnasiet in Kungälv and Balettakademien in Gothenburg.

Between 2005 and 2006, she was a member of the music group Cosmo4 and the group released the music singles Peek-A-Boo and Adios Amigos while she was still a member.

She has participated in the TV4 celebrity dancing show Let's Dance three years in a row. In 2006 she danced with celebrity Viktor Åkerblom Nilsson, where she finished in third place. In the 2007 season she danced with Patrick Ekwall and placed ninth In 2008 she participated with Mats Carlsson where she placed fifth.

In July 2008, she worked as a program announcer for TV4 and also at TV4 Plus. She was chosen as "Sweden's sexiest woman" by the magazine QX in February of the same year. In late 2009 she presented Förkväll at TV4.

In September 2011 she was the sidekick of Adam Alsing in his talk show #AdamLive along with Daniel Breitholtz. The show aired for two seasons on TV3. In 2013, Carin da Silva and Adam Alsing presented Kändishoppet at TV3. In 2020, da Silva participated in SVT's show Bäst i test.

== Musical and theater ==
- 2005 Häxjakten – Teater Thalia
- 2005 Journey – Teater Thalia
- 2006 Fifteen Minutes of Fame – Scen Österlen

== TV and film ==
- 2004 Orka! Orka!
- 2005 Sandor slash Ida
- 2006 Let's Dance
- 2007 Let's Dance
- 2008 Let's Dance
- 2009 Förkväll
- 2011 #AdamLive
- 2013 Kändishoppet
- 2020 Bäst i test

== Discography ==
=== Music singles ===
- 2006 – Peek-A-Boo (with Cosmo4)
- 2006 – Adios Amigos (with Cosmo4)
