= Trying to Recall =

Single by Marie Lindberg

from the album Trying to Recall
- A-side: "Trying to Recall" (radio edit)
- B-side: "Trying to Recall " (original version)
- Released: 5 March 2007
- Genre: acoustic pop
- Label: Monitor Entertainment Group
- Songwriter(s): Marie Lindberg
- Producer(s): Patrik Frisk

Marie Lindberg singles chronology
"Trying to Recall" (2007)	"Leona (under Her Skin)" (2007)

"Trying to Recall" is an acoustic song written by Swedish schoolteacher Marie Lindberg in May 1998, with song lyrics describing a couple who are about to go apart from each other. The song was performed by herself at Melodifestivalen 2007. The song participated in the semifinals inside Scandinavium in Gothenburg on 10 February 2007, heading directly to the finals inside the Stockholm Globe Arena, where it ended up 5th. On 5 March 2007, the single was released, peaking at 4th position at the Swedish singles chart.

The song also charted at Svensktoppen, entering the chart on 22 April 2007 ending up 4th. and the song also peaked at 4th position there. On 10 June 2007, the song had been knocked down to the 8th position, ending an eight weeks long Svensktoppen visit.

== Track listing ==
1. Trying to Recall (radio edit)
2. Trying to Recall (original version)

== Charts ==
Chart (2007)	Peak position
Sweden (Sverigetopplistan)	4
