= Love Made Me Do It (album) =

Studio album by Elin Lanto
- Released: (Sweden) 5 May 2010
- Recorded: 2008 – 2010
- Genres: Electropop, synthpop, pop rock
- Length: 37:40
- Label: Catchy Tunes

Elin Lanto chronology
One (2005)	Love Made Me Do It (2010)

Singles from Love Made Me Do It
- 1. "Speak n' Spell" Released: 14 February 2008; 2. "My Favourite Pair of Jeans" Released: 7 August 2008; 3. "Discotheque" Released: 30 October 2008; 4. "Love Made Me Stupid" Released: 19 November 2009; 5. "Doctor, Doctor" Released: 20 February 2010; 6. "Tickles" Released: 19 April 2010; 7. "Funeral"

Love Made Me Do It is the second studio album by Swedish singer Elin Lanto. The album was released as a digital download 3 May 2010, followed by a physical release on 5 May 2010. The album demonstrates Lanto's move from her previous pop work, most notably from her debut album One which was released in 2005, to rock-influenced synthpop. The album contains four Swedish Top 40 hits on the Swedish Singles Chart. The album, however, failed to enter the Swedish Albums Chart, while Lanto's debut album One peaked at number 25 on the chart.

== Track list ==
No.	Title	Writer(s)	Length
1.	"Hater"	Tony Nilsson, Mirja Breitholtz	3:07
2.	"Funeral"	Tony Nilsson, Henrik Jansson	3:33
3.	"Tickles"	Per Aldeheim, Mårten Tromm	3:21
4.	"Doctor Doctor"	Tony Nilsson, Mirja Breitholtz	3:01
5.	"Alien"	Tony Nilsson	3:51
6.	"Love Made Me Stupid"	Tony Nilsson, Hawksley Workman	3:41
7.	"Toy Boy"	Tony Nilsson, Steffan Olsson	3:01
8.	"Give It All Up"	Tony Nilsson, Lisa Lövbrand	3:30
9.	"Good Stuff"	Linda Sundblad, Robin Lynch, Niklas Olovson	3:10
10.	"My Favourite Pair of Jeans"	Tony Nilsson, Greg Johnston	2:56
11.	"Singing Goodbye"	Tony Nilsson, Henrick Jansson, Elin Lanto	4:18

Bonus tracks

No.	Title	Length
12.	"Speak n' Spell"	3:21
13.	"Discotheque"	3:04

== Singles ==
Since 2008, Lanto has released 3 singles which are not included on her debut album One and it is currently unknown whether or not these singles, namely: "Speak 'n Spell"; "My Favourite Pair of Jeans" and "Discotheque", will feature on her second album. Lanto said of these tracks "We haven’t really decided yet if they ["Speak 'n Spell"; "Discotheque"] will be on there. When I recorded ‘Discotheque’ and ‘Speak N Spell’, we were doing songs that were more disco. But the new songs are more pop and rock, with a bit of punk in there. So we’ll have to record them again if we want them on the album."

- "Love Made Me Stupid" - Lanto uploaded the song onto her official website and myspace on 9 November 2009 then the official music video was released to YouTube on 19 November 2009. The video was directed by Robinovich. The single was released as a promo to showcase her musical genre shift. The song is expected to be released in the UK and France shortly.
- "Doctor, Doctor" - This song was Lanto's Melodifestivalen 2010 entry. Lanto performed the song on 20 February 2010 in Scandinavium, Gothenburg. Her song came 7th out of 8 and was therefore eliminated from the competition.
- "Tickles" - Lanto's third song was released on 19 April 2010 along with a music video which, produced by the same director to work on the Love Made Me Stupid video.
- "Funeral" was supposed to be the last song to be released from the album. The Scandinavian single release was postponed and then cancelled, however a 7th Heaven Remix was commissioned for the clubs in January 2011. Lanto signed on the Belgian dance label ARS records; "Funeral" was set to be eventually released commercially during the Summer 2011, but it was once again cancelled.

== Release history ==
Region	Date
Sweden	3 May 2010 (digital); 5 May 2010 (physical)
