= Stefan Andersson (singer) =

Swedish singer-songwriter

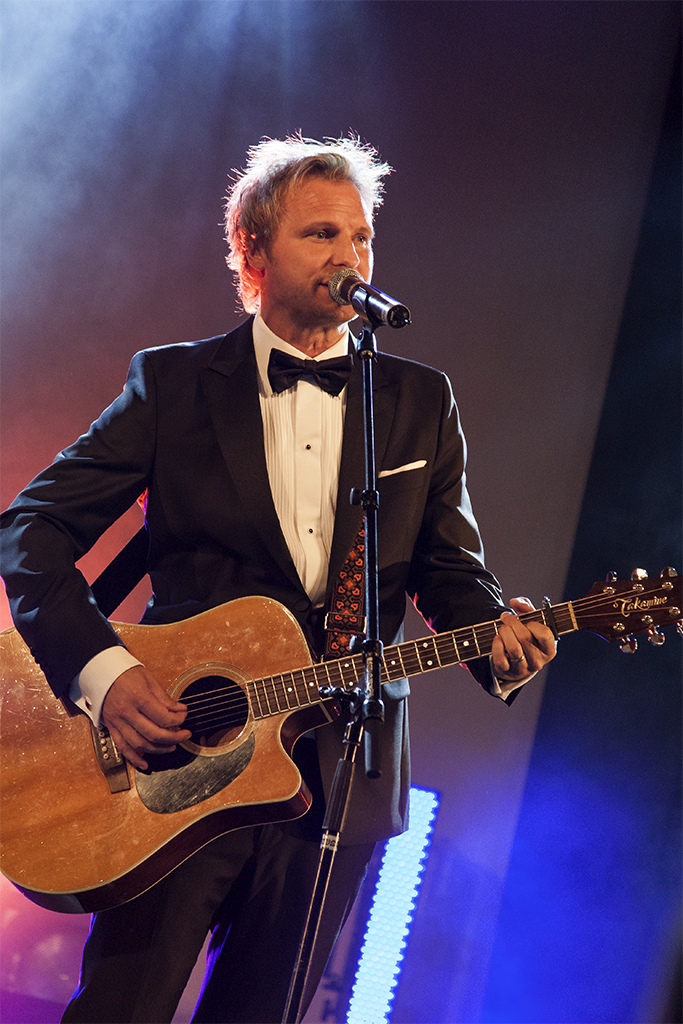
- Stefan Andersson, 2014

Background information
- Born: 8 August 1967 (age 58); Haga, Gothenburg, Sweden
- Genres: Rock Pop, Schlager
- Occupations: Singer, songwriter, musician
- Instrument: Guitar
- Years active: 1992 – present
- Website: www.stefanandersson.nu

Stefan Andersson (born in Haga, Gothenburg, Sweden on 8 August 1967) is a Swedish singer-songwriter. Andersson is known for his 1992 Swedish hit song "Catch the Moon", which reached No. 4 on the Swedish charts.

== Melodifestivalen ==
Andersson participated in Melodifestivalen 2007 with Aleena Gibson as Andersson & Gibson, with the song Anything But You. They placed fifth in semi-final round one, but were not chosen to advance to the final round or the second chance round by Swedish audiences.

== Discography ==
=== Albums ===
| Year | Album | Peak chart positions | Certification |
| Year | Album | SWE | Certification |
|---|---|---|---|
| 1992 | Emperors' Day | 2 | |
| 1993 | Walk Right On | 1 | |
| 1996 | Under a Low-Ceilinged Sky | 8 | |
| 1997 | På svenska | 38 | |
| 2004 | Stranger's House | 11 | |
| 2008 | No. 90 Kleist | 14 | |
| 2009 | Skeppsråttan | 18 | |
| 2011 | Teaterkungen | 19 | |
| 2015 | Made in China | - | |
| 2018 | Flygblad över Berlin | - | |

Live albums

| Year | Single | Peak chart positions | Album |
| Year | Single | SWE | Album |
|---|---|---|---|
| 2005 | En främlings hus (Live från Annedalskyrkan) | 38 | |

Compilation albums

- 2007 – Det bästa med
- 2012 – En samlad Stefan 1992–2012 (# 47 Sweden)

=== Singles ===
| Year | Single | Peak chart positions | Album |
| Year | Single | SWE | Album |
|---|---|---|---|
| 1992 | "Catch the Moon" | 4 | |
| 1992 | "It's Over Now" | 23 | |
| 1993 | "Walk Right On" | 26 | |
| 1996 | "Anywhere Is Paradise" | 50 | |
| 1997 | "Välkommen" | 20 | |
