= Sebastian Karlsson (singer) =

Sebastian
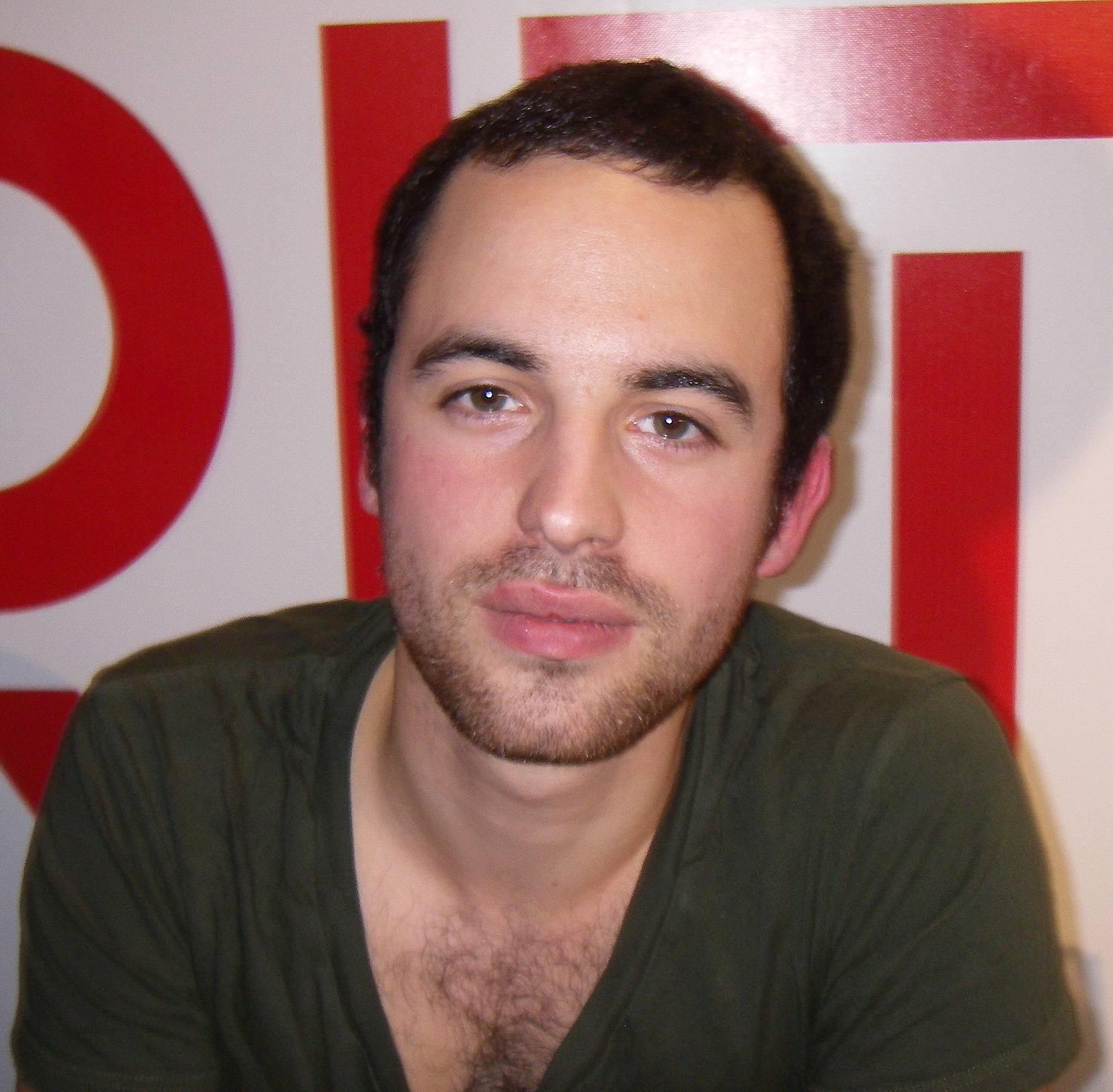
- Sebastian at a record signing in Norrköping, Sweden 2007.

Background information
- Born: Sebastian Karlsson; 2 January 1985 (age 40)
- Origin: Sweden
- Genres: Pop, Rock
- Years active: 2004–present
- Labels: Sony BMG (2005–2007); Roxy Records (2008–Present)
- Website: sebastiankarlsson.net (in Swedish)

Sebastian Karlsson (born 2 January 1985), known professionally as Sebastian, is a Swedish singer and performer, best known for his participation in Idol 2005, where he came in second place after Agnes Carlsson. He got a radio hit in Sweden with his first single "Do what you're told" in 2006.

Karlsson was born in Morgongåva. He competed in the Swedish Melodifestivalen 2007 with the song "When the Night Comes Falling" for the opportunity to represent Sweden in the Eurovision Song Contest 2007 in Helsinki, Finland, finished 8th in the final. He returned to Melodifestivalen in 2011 with the song "No One Else Could", finishing 5th in the third semi-final.

== Discography ==
=== Albums ===
Year	Information	Chart positions	Sales and certifications
Year	Information	Sweden	Sales and certifications
2006	Sebastian: 1st Studio album; Released: 1 March 2006; Format: CD	1	IFPI Sweden: Gold; Swedish Sales: 30,000
2007	The Vintage Virgin: 2nd Studio album; Released: 8 March 2007; Formats: CD	2	IFPI Sweden: Gold; Swedish Sales: 30,000
2009	The Most Beautiful Lie: 3rd Studio album; Released: 28 January 2009; Formats: CD	32	IFPI Sweden:

=== Singles ===
Year	Single	Album	Chart positions	
Year	Single	Album	Sweden	Europe
2006	"Do What You're Told"	Sebastian	1	129
2006	"Indifferent"	Sebastian	38	-
2006	"Words and Violence"	The Vintage Virgin	3	170
2007	"When the Night Comes Falling"	The Vintage Virgin	2	184
2007	"I Can Feel You"	The Vintage Virgin		
2008	"My Getaway"	The Most Beautiful Lie		
2009	"Serial Lovers"	The Most Beautiful Lie		
2011	"No One Else Could"			
