= Tommy Nilsson =

Swedish pop singer

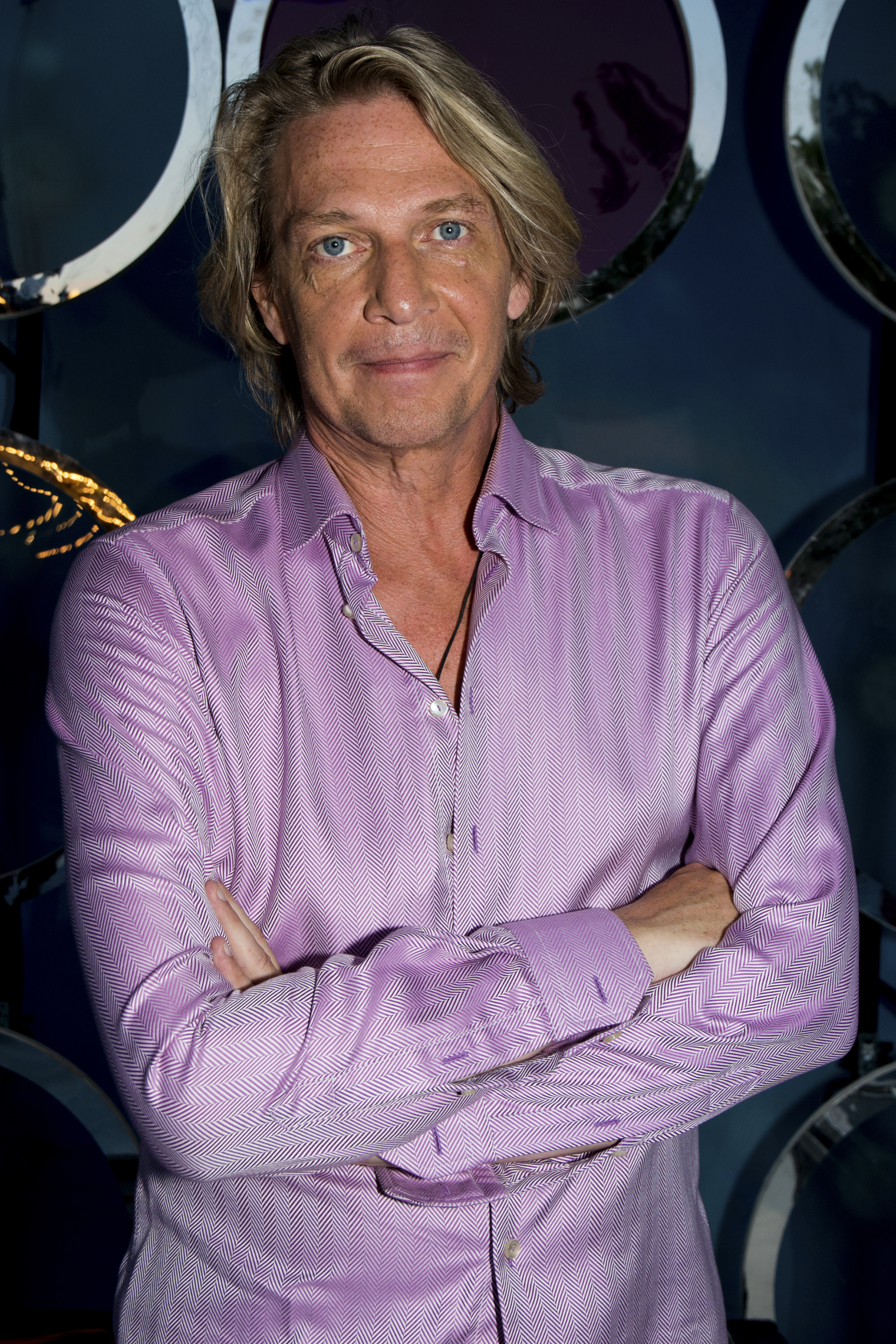
- Nilsson in 2013

Background information
- Born: Erik Tommy Nilsson; 11 March 1960 (age 66); Solna, Sweden
- Genres: Pop; rock; schlager; soft rock; hard rock; glam metal
- Occupations: Singer; songwriter
- Member of: Easy Action
- Formerly of: Horizont
- Spouse(s): Malin Berghagen (m. 1993; div. 2007) Linda Olsson (m. 2017)

Erik Tommy Nilsson (born 11 March 1960) is a Swedish singer and songwriter. He represented Sweden in the Eurovision Song Contest 1989, coming fourth. He is also a member of the rock group Easy Action.

== Music career ==
In the late 1970s, Nilsson was the singer of the Swedish rock band Horizont. The group released two albums but a French producer, Yves Accary, contacted Nilsson and signed him to a French record company. The singer enjoyed his first big hit in France in 1981 with the song "No Way No How". The single sold one million copies and the album 200 000 copies. No Way No How, his first album, included disco tracks and ballads. A follow-up LP Tommy Nilsson was released in 1982 and this time the songs were composed by Tommy Nilsson and Alex R Contanstinos. This was a rock album, recorded in Stockholm and Los Angeles, but it did not sell very well and after two years of travelling between France and the United States, Nilsson decided to go back to Sweden.

Nilsson later joined the hard rock group Easy Action, and recorded one album with them, That Makes One. The group eventually split up and Nilsson started a solo career. He represented Sweden in the Eurovision Song Contest 1989 with the ballad En dag (One day) and placed fourth. He has also made several Swedish hits in Sweden; Allt som jag känner (Everything that I feel) (a duet with Tone Norum) in 1987, Öppna din dörr (Open your door) in 1994, Dina färger var blå (Your colours were blue) in 1996, and Amelia in 2005. In 1988, he was given an award for best Swedish male artist and in 1994 received a gold disc for his album En Kvinnas Man.

In 2001, a compilation of his songs, En samling 1981–2001, went platinum in Sweden. In 2005, his album Tiden före nu reached # 2 on the Swedish sales chart just after its release.

Nilsson took part in the Swedish national Eurovision Song Contest selection again in 2007. He performed the power ballad Jag tror på människan (I believe in man) in Melodifestivalen 2007's first semi-final in Jönköping on 3 February 2007, and qualified for the final round, along with Anna Book. The song placed tenth and last in the final after failing to receive any points from the judges or the televoting audience. Nevertheless, Jag tror på människan reached number 9 on the Svensktoppen.

He has been back in the band Easy Action since 2019.

== Other work ==
Nilsson has also collaborated with Swedish television, dubbed cartoons, and acted in several plays.

In 1997, Nilsson co-starred with Mary Wilson of the Supremes in Supreme Soul, the story of a black singer who arrives in Sweden to do a show with a white singer. The show consisted of music, as well as humorous moments that highlighted culture differences between Sweden and the United States.

Nilsson played the part of Captain von Trapp in the musical The Sound of Music that ran in Stockholm beginning 29 September 2007, ending with a tour and the last performance in Örebro in May 2008.

In 2016, he participated in Så mycket bättre, which was broadcast on TV4. He also participated in the Swedish show Stjärnornas stjärna in 2018, broadcast on the same channel.

Nilsson is also known for his dubbing work for animated films and series, including Bonkers, Top Cat, Batman: The Animated Series, The Busy World of Richard Scarry, the voice of Patrick Star in SpongeBob SquarePants, among others. He dubbed Mel Gibson's voice of John Smith in Pocahontas.

== Personal life ==
Nilsson was previously married to Swedish actress Malin Berghagen. Since 2017, he has been married to actress Linda Olsson.

== Discography ==
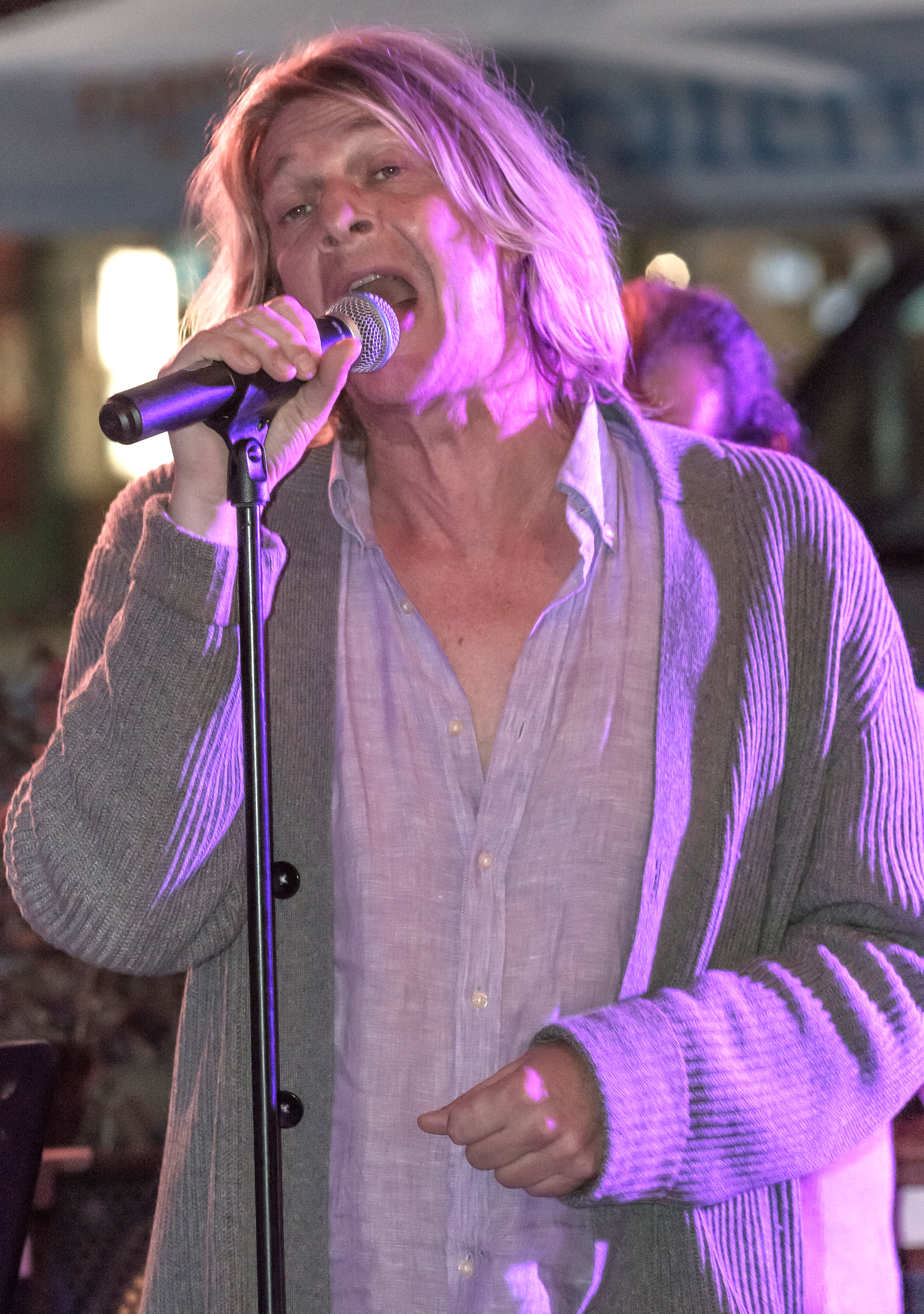
Nilsson performing in 2014

=== Albums ===
Studio albums

Year	Album	Peak positions	Certification
Year	Album	SWE	Certification
1982	Tommy Nilsson	–	
1988	It!	3	
1990	Follow the Road	11	
1994	En kvinnas man	8	
1996	Så nära	15	
1999	Fri att vara här	57	
2005	Tiden före nu	2	
2010	I år är julen min		
2013	Stay Straight on the Current Road	52	

Compilation albums

Year	Album	Peak positions
Year	Album	SWE
2001	En samling 1981–2001	2
2006	Det bästa med Tommy Nilsson	38

=== Singles ===
Year	Song	Peak positions	Album
Year	Song	SWE	Album
1988	"Allt som jag känner" (with Tone Norum)	1	
1988	"Maybe We're About to Fall in Love"	1	
1988	"Miss My Love"	18	
1989	"En dag"	3	
1989	"Time" (with Zemya Hamilton)	19	
1994	"Öppna din dörr"	2	
1995	"Dina färger var blå"	9	
1999	"Här är jag nu"	46	
2007	"Jag tror på människan"	12	
2016	"Sommarnatt"	75	
2018	"Om du ser mig"	—	
2019	"Högre"	—	

Other singles

- 1981: "In the Mean Meantimes" / "No Way No How"
- 1981: "Radio Me"
- 1987: "My Summer With You" (with Tone Norum)
- 1990: "Too Many Expectations"
- 1990: "Looking Through the Eyes of a Child"
- 1990: "Don't Walk Away"
- 1991: "Long Lasting Love"
- 1994: "En kvinnas man"
- 1994: "Lämnar du mig"
- 1994: "Marianne"
- 1996: "Om jag är den du vill ha"
- 1996: "Å så nära"
- 1996: "Du är för mig"
- 1999: "Din skugga på mitt täcke"
- 2001: "När du är här"
- 2002: "Nu är tid att leva" (with Åsa Jinder)
- 2005: "Amelia"
- 2005: "Allt ditt hjärta är"
- 2006: "Vi brann"
- 2016: "Håll mitt hjärta hårt" (with Patrik Isaksson and Uno Svenningsson as Patrik, Tommy & Uno (Melodifestivalen 2016)
- 2016: "My Love Is Not Blind"
- 2016: "Det sitter i dig"

Awards and achievements
Preceded by Tommy Körberg with "Stad i ljus"	Sweden in the Eurovision Song Contest; 1989	Succeeded by Edin-Ådahl with "Som en vind"
