= When the Night Comes Falling =

2007 pop song

Single by Sebastian Karlsson

from the album The Vintage Virgin
- A-side: "When the Night Comes Falling"
- B-side: "When the Night Comes Falling" (instrumental version)
- Released: 4 March 2007
- Genre: pop
- Label: Sony BMG Music Entertainment
- Songwriter(s): Sebastian Karlsson, Peter Kvint

Sebastian Karlsson singles chronology
| ""Words and Violence"" (2006) | "When the Night Comes Falling" (2007) | ""I Can Feel You"" (2007) |

"When the Night Comes Falling" is a song written by Sebastian Karlsson and Peter Kvint and performed by Sebastian Karlsson at Melodifestivalen 2007. The song participated at the semifinals in Örnsköldsvik on 17 February 2007, heading directly to the finals inside the Stockholm Globe Arena on 10 March 2007, where it finished in eighth place. On 4 March 2007, the single was released, peaking at second place at the Swedish singles chart. The song also became available at Sebastian Karlsson's album The Vintage Virgin.

The song charted at Svensktoppen, entering the chart on 22 April 2007 ending up 10th during the first week. The following week, the song had been knocked out.

== Track listing ==
1. When the Night Comes Falling
2. When the Night Comes Falling (instrumental)

== Charts ==
| Chart (2007) | Peak position |
|---|---|
| Sweden (Sverigetopplistan) | 2 |
