= A Little Bit of Love (Andreas Johnson song) =

Single by Andreas Johnson

from the album The Collector
- A-side: "A Little Bit of Love"
- Released: 4 March 2007
- Genre: Pop
- Label: Warner Music Sweden
- Songwriters: Andreas Johnson, Peter Kvint

Andreas Johnson singles chronology
"Sunshine of Mine" (2006)	"A Little Bit of Love" (2007)	"Go for the Soul" (2007)

"A Little Bit of Love" is a song written by Andreas Johnson and Peter Kvint, and performed by Andreas Johnson at Melodifestivalen 2007. The song participated in the semifinale in Gävle on 24 February 2007, heading directly to the finals inside the Stockholm Globe Arena on 10 March 2007, finishing second. On 5 March 2007 the single was released. The single peaked at third position at the Swedish singles chart, and became a major radio hit both at Sveriges Radio and the commercial stadions.

The song also charted at Svensktoppen, entering the chart on 8 April 2007 on 2nd position. On 15 April 2007 the song topped the chart. On 19 August 2007 the song was at Svensktoppen for 20th and final time. before getting knocked out the upcoming week.

== Single track listing ==
1. A Little Bit of Love
2. A Little Bit of Love (PJ Harmony Remix Version)

== Charts ==
Chart (2007)	Peak position
Swedish singles chart	3
