= Anna Book =

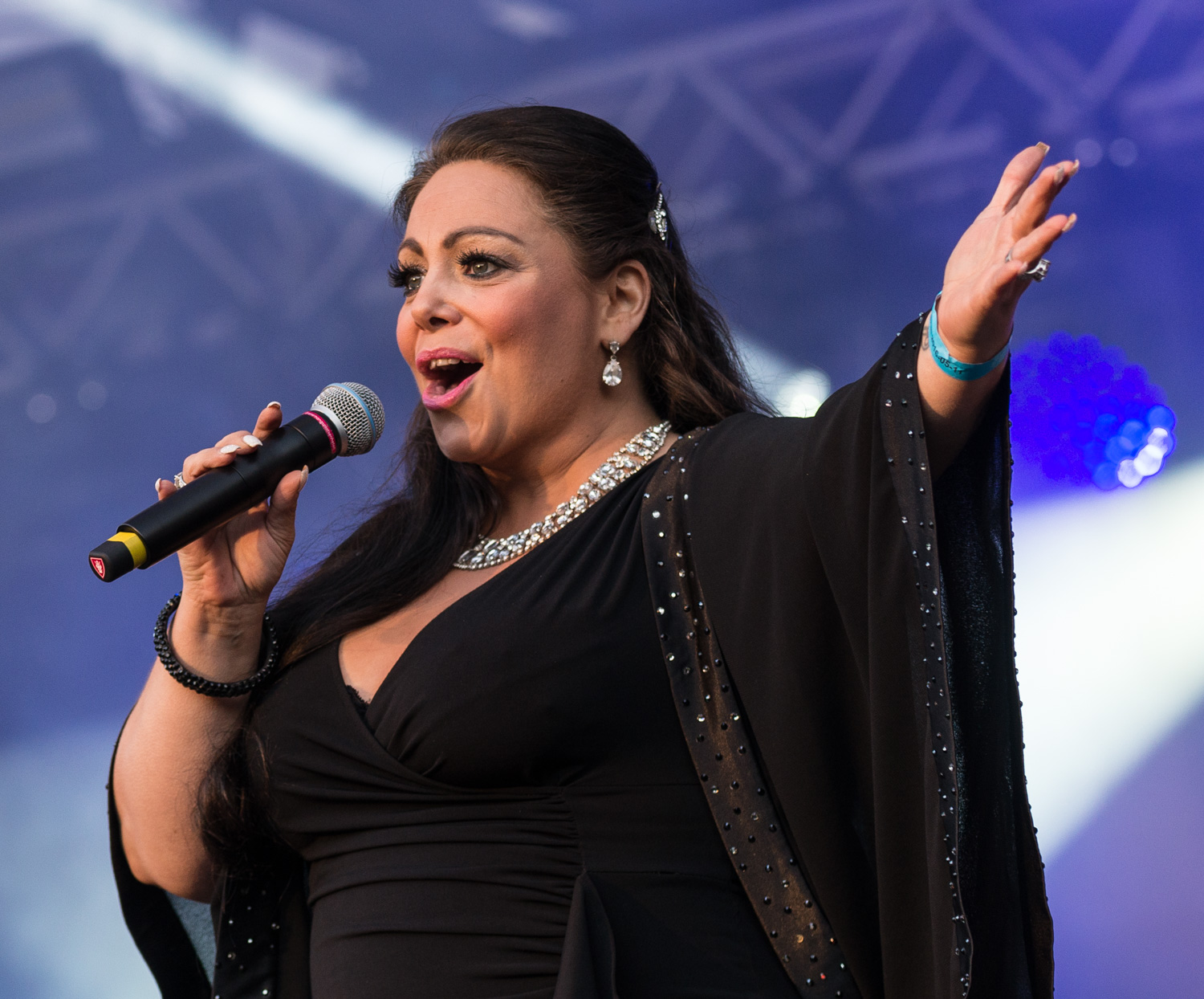
- Book in 2016

Background information
- Born: Anna Maria Therés Book; 10 September 1970 (age 55); Stockholm, Sweden
- Genres: Schlager
- Occupation: Singer
- Years active: 1985–

Anna Maria Therés Book Toledano (born 10 September 1970) is a Swedish pop singer. She participated in Let's Dance in 2006 and finished in second place with dancer David Watson.

== Melodifestivalen ==
She has participated in Melodifestivalen, the contest to select Sweden's entry for the Eurovision Song Contest, a total of 3 times. At the first Melodifestivalen 2007 semi-final on 3 February in Jönköping, Book's song "Samba Sambero" was the second song announced as a finalist. The song then went on and finished ninth and second last in the final, where it received one point. Her fourth participation would have been in 2016 with the song "Himmel för två" (Heaven for Two). However, her song was disqualified on 4 February 2016, two days before the semi-final because the song had already participated in the Moldovan national selection for the Eurovision Song Contest 2014.

| Year | Title | Placing | Additional Info |
|---|---|---|---|
| 1986 | ABC | 5th (24 points) | |
| 1987 | Det finns en morgondag (There is a Tomorrow) | Unplaced | |
| 2007 | Samba Sambero | 9th (one point) | Written by Thomas G:son. |
| 2016 | Himmel för två (Heaven For Two) | Unplaced | Disqualified |

== Discography ==
=== Albums ===
| Title | Year | Peak chart positions |
| Title | Year | SWE |
|---|---|---|
| Killsnack – backing vocals by Lili & Susie | 1985 | — |
| Längtar | 1986 | — |
| Anna | 1995 | — |
| Let's Dance + 13 favoriter | 2006 | 7 |
| ABC | 2006 | — |
| Samba Sambero | 2007 | 38 |

=== Singles ===
- 1986 "Killsnack"
- 1986 "ABC"
- 1996 "My Love for You"
- 2007 Samba Sambero
