= Winterland (Sarah Dawn Finer album) =

Studio album by Sarah Dawn Finer
- Released: 3 November 2010
- Genre: gospel, Christmas, soul
- Label: King Island Roxystar Recordings

Sarah Dawn Finer chronology
Moving On (2009)	Winterland (2010)	Sanningen kommer om natten (2012)

Winterland is the third studio album by Sarah Dawn Finer, released on 3 November 2010.

The album has been described as a "winter's album", and consists of many Christmas songs.

== Track listing ==
1. I'll Be Home for Christmas
2. Maybe This Christmas
3. Have Yourself a Merry Little Christmas
4. The Christmas Song
5. In the Bleak Midwinter
6. Christmas Time Is Here
7. Angel
8. Auld Lang Syne (Godnattvalsen)
9. I'll Be Your Wish Tonight
10. Winter Song
11. River
12. What a Wonderful World
13. Sometimes It Snows In April
14. Kärleksvisan (bonus track)

== Charts ==
Chart (2010–2011)	Peak position
Swedish Albums (Sverigetopplistan)	2
