= Johan Röhr =

Swedish musician

Johan Röhr is a Swedish musician. In March 2024, Swedish newspaper Dagens Nyheter revealed Röhr as the composer of over 2,700 songs on Spotify, where they had been streamed more than 15 billion times. The composer published music under more than 650 different names, with his combined number of streamed songs surpassing those of artists such as ABBA.
