= Peter Hallström =

Swedish songwriter

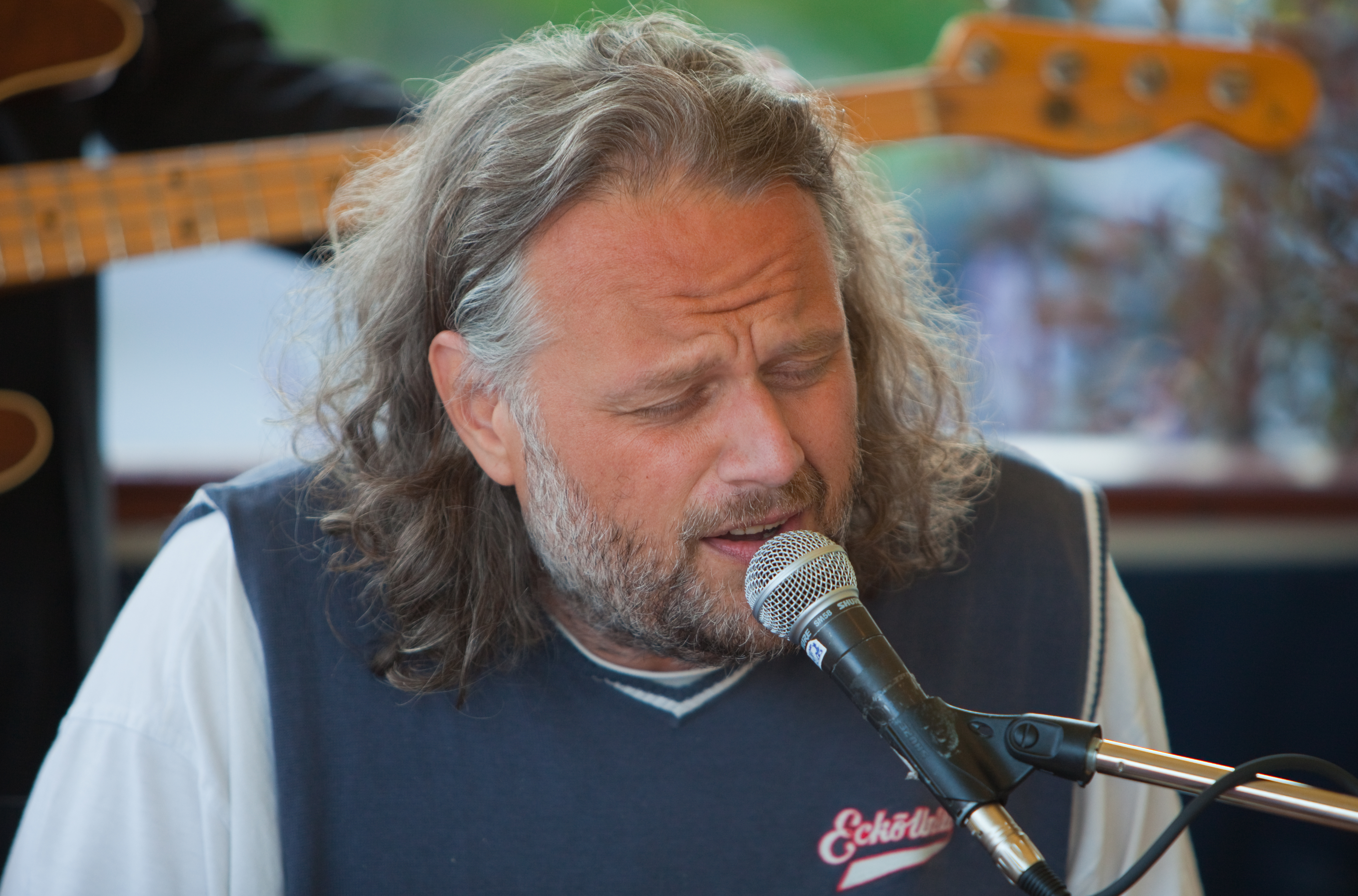

Background information
- Birth name: Peter Berno Hallström
- Born: 19 January 1965 (age 60); Sweden
- Occupation(s): Songwriter, musician, record and sound producer
- Website: www.peterhallstrom.se

Peter Hallström is a Swedish songwriter, musician and artist. His song "Håll mitt hjärta" (Hold my heart) is the number one favorite song at funerals all over Sweden according to Fonus. The song is also performed at many weddings.

"Kärleksvisan" is the second most appreciated love song according to listeners of one of the largest radio stations in Sweden Mix Megapol. In 2017 the song was ranked top ten among the most played songs at weddings in Sweden according to the daily newspaper Metro. The song was performed by Sarah Dawn Finer at the evening festivities at the Stockholm Concert Hall as a gift from the Swedish parliament and the Swedish people the evening before the royal wedding between Crown Princess Victoria and Prince Daniel of Sweden in 2010.

The song "Viskar en bön" is played a lot around Christmas time. Hallström also wrote the song "I Remember Love", performed by Sarah Dawn Finer. It was placed 4th in the final of Melodifestivalen 2007.

As a background vocalist Hallström has participated at ten Melodifestivalen TV-shows and three editions of the Eurovision Song Contest. As a background singer he also contributes to other recordings with various artists.

== Discography ==
Hallström has released three records with Swedish lyrics.

=== Albums ===
Year	Album
2012	Brev från en förlorad son
2013	Nåd
2016	Hoppet kvar
