= Jakob Hellman =

Swedish singer (born 1965)

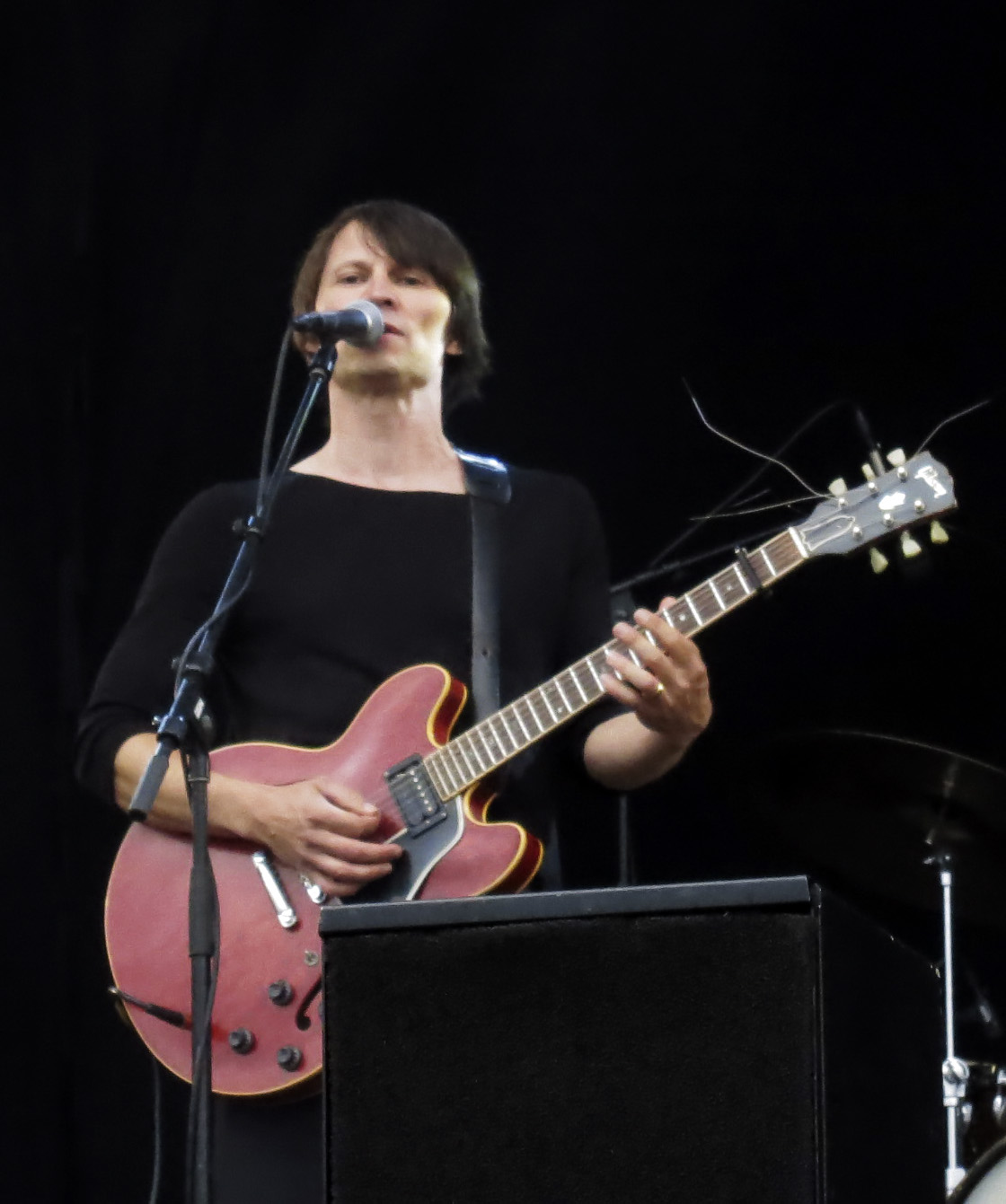
- Hellman performing at Solid Sound Festival in Uddevalla, Sweden in 2014

Background information
- Born: 20 October 1965 (age 60); Vuollerim, Sweden
- Genres: pop, rock
- Occupations: Singer
- Years active: 1988–present
- Label: EMI

Jakob Hellman (born 20 October 1965) is a Swedish pop singer. His debut album, ...och stora havet, released in 1989, was his only release for 32 years. He released his second album, Äntligen borta, on 8 January 2021.

== Background ==
The son of two teachers, Jakob Hellman grew up in rural north Sweden, just south of the polar circle. In school, he was in the same class as Zemya Hamilton, later to be known as the lead singer of house music act Clubland.

In the lyrics of his first single, Hellman states that he was "born between the mirror and the grammophone" ("född mellan spegeln och grammofon"), attesting to his early pop star ambitions. At a young age, he played in a local band, Ampere, with his friends Anders Viklund, Ulf Johansson and Tommy Johansson. In a 2006 interview, the members recalled singing through a megaphone at the start, since they did not have a proper microphone. At the start, the only song they could play was "Smoke on the Water". Later, "Do You Wanna Dance?" and "The House of the Rising Sun" were added to the repertoire.

Jakob Hellman's family later moved to Falun, where he played with a band named Fortune. In the mid-1980s, Jakob Hellman moved to Stockholm. Since the 1990s, Hellman resided in Malmö in Southwestern Sweden until he moved to Mallorca when his wife, a priest in the Church of Sweden, took on a position in the local church. He became a father for the first time in 2009. In July 2014, he married Karolina Svensson and went on a summer tour of Sweden.

== The recording of ...och stora havet ==
Without previous experience of the music business, Jakob Hellman sent his demo to ten different record companies in December 1987. Magnus Nygren, at the time A&R at the Swedish division of EMI Music, took interest and arranged a meeting. Much to his own surprise, Hellman soon had a record contract in his hand. Recordings started in the EMI studio in the Stockholm suburb of Skärmarbrink in 1988. Hellman also spent some time touring, opening for the rock band Wilmer X.

Session musicians included Per Hägglund from Imperiet (keyboards), Eddie Sjöberg, ex-member of Reeperbahn (guitar), Werner Modiggård from Eldkvarn (drums), and Wilmer X member Mats Bengtsson (piano). Titiyo provided backing vocals for the song "Avundsjuk på dej".

In a 2007 interview in a Jakob Hellman special on the Swedish public service music radio show Musikjournalen (broadcast on 15 January 2007 on SR P3), producer Dan Sundquist told the story of a rather strenuous recording experience, due to Hellman's unwillingness to compromise with his convictions on how the music ought to sound. Many of the participating musicians support his view stating that Hellman wanted the album to sound rawer and rockier.

=== The album's release ===
The first single, "Tåg" (Train) was released in 1988. The same year Jakob Hellman won a Grammis (the Swedish equivalent of a Grammy Award) as Best Newcomer. The album followed on 13 February 1989. Seven out of the nine songs featured on the demo were included on the album. The original release contained twelve tracks; a later reissue adds the single B-sides and a few other tracks for a total of 19. Although Hellman himself wanted to name the album De sista melodierna (The Last Melodies). It instead borrowed its title from one of the non-single songs, ...Och stora havet (...And the great sea).

Musically, most of the album's songs can be described as quite radio-friendly guitar-based music in the singer-songwriter vein, although Hellman's syncopated singing style set him apart from most of the competition. In interviews, Jakob Hellman cited Elvis Costello as his greatest influence, and although his music by no means could be called a carbon copy, similarities can easily be found. The lyrics, entirely in Swedish, range from rather simple love songs to more philosophical themes. They are characterized by inventive turns of phrase, often imitated by followers.

=== Reception ===
At the time of its release, Hellman's album got positive, although not jubilant, reviews, and the single "Vara vänner" (Being Friends) became a major hit. The accompanying video is notable for its extremely minimalistic scenography.

At the 1989 Swedish Grammis Awards Jakob Hellman won the Best Male Rock artist award, but not the Best Album one (it was given to Jerry Williams). With the passing of time, however, the record has come to be regarded as one of the most influential Swedish pop records, and in 1997 it was voted the best Swedish record ever in Nöjesguiden, a monthly entertainment magazine.

A few covers of Hellman's songs have been recorded. In 1997, the band Jumper had a minor hit with the single "Hon har ett sätt". The track was also remixed by house music act Antiloop. In 2006, singers Anna Stadling and Idde Schultz covered the B-side "Vägar hem" on an album named after the song.

As of 2007, ...och stora havet has sold a total of over 160,000 copies.

=== After the album ===
Hellman did not succeed in following up the album's major success despite writing songs – one titled "Min Marie" was debuted live in Örebro in April 1989 – for an album intended for release one year after the debut. After appearing on an Evert Taube tribute album and featuring in a duet with folk-rock act Perssons Pack in 1991, he withdrew from the spotlight entirely. Reluctantly interviewed, he told journalists he had been studying different subjects at Lund University and had no plans for a new record despite later admitting to writing a large number of songs that he kept in a cassette tape archive at his home. In 1995, he briefly joined Brainpool in the studio to provide backing vocals for the Painkiller album track "We aim to please".

In the end of the 1990s Hellman started to occasionally appear on stage again. In recent years, Hellman has been playing several smaller venues and minor festivals, performing both old and unreleased tracks, fueling his fans' hopes for a return to recording. In 2005 Hellman did enter the studio for the first time in a decade, contributing two covers to an Olle Adolphson tribute album. The following year, he appeared on a duet with Nina Ramsby, "Du min vän", on the Nina Ramsby & Martin Hederos album Jazzen. However, these episodes seem to be isolated events.

In recent years, Hellman has completed three tours in Sweden in 2011 – 2012, playing many new songs alongside his classics, and played one show only in 2013, at the club Debaser in Stockholm in December.

On 8 January 2021 Hellman released his second album, Äntligen borta on CD, vinyl and digital. It was followed in June 2021 by a digital-only release of an acoustic live album with songs from both albums and two covers, "Live från Palma".

== Interviews ==
In a 2005 interview (in Bo.stad, a magazine for the tenants of the Lund student housing foundation AF Bostäder), Hellman, at the time living in a shared flat in Malmö, speculated on "maybe" releasing a new album some day, although not in the immediate future. "Not in the next six months, anyway. If I found the right musicians to work with, maybe in another genre, it would be fun. I want to do simple songs, which is what I'm good at." The same year, he recorded two songs, "Lenas Visa" and "Mina Båtar", for the Olle Adolphson tribute album Dubbeltrubbel.

In July 2006, his childhood band Ampere reformed to play at the Kulturkraft festival in Vuollerim. "It is fun to play in a band again. [...] Compared to being on my own, playing under my own name, it feels very relaxed," Hellman commented.

In the 2007 Musikjournalen Hellman radio special, Jakob Hellman spoke about feeling as if he were the album's "luxury wife", still partly living off its revenue. He said a new album felt "far away", and that he was focusing on writing one song at a time to be able to play live.

== Discography ==
=== Studio albums ===
- ...och stora havet (1989) (remastered version with extra tracks released in 1999)
- Äntligen borta (2021)

=== Live albums ===
- Live från Palma (2021)

=== Singles ===
- Tåg (1988)
- Vara vänner (1989)
- Hon har ett sätt (1989)
- Jag kan inte säga hejdå till dig/När jag går in och känner mig utanför (2020)

=== Compilations ===
- Tältet on Den flygande holländaren, a tribute album to Cornelis Vreeswijk (1988)
- Fritiof och Carmencita and Tango i Nizza on Taube, a tribute album to Evert Taube (1990)
- Lenas Visa and Mina Båtar on Dubbel trubbel, a tribute album to Olle Adolphson) (2005)

=== Guest vocals ===
- Tusen dagar härifrån, duet with Per Persson, on the Perssons Pack on the album Äkta hjärtan (1991)
- We Aim To Please, backing vocals, on the Brainpool album Painkiller (1995)
- Du min vän, duet with Nina Ramsby, on the Nina Ramsby & Martin Hederos album Jazzen (2006)
