= Higher Ground =

Higher Ground may refer to:

== Military tactics ==
- High ground, an area of elevated terrain

== Film and television ==
- Higher Ground (film), a 2011 drama starring Vera Farmiga
- Higher Ground (TV series), a 2000 Canadian drama/adventure series
- Higher Ground, a 1988 TV movie starring John Denver
- "Higher Ground" (Shoestring), a 1979 television episode

== Music ==
=== Albums ===
- Higher Ground (Barbra Streisand album), 1997
- Higher Ground (Joan Kennedy album), 1992
- Higher Ground (John Denver album), 1989
- Higher Ground (Johnny Hammond album), 1973
- Higher Ground (Tammy Wynette album), 1987
- Higher Ground Hurricane Relief Benefit Concert (album), 2005
- Higher Ground, a 2002 album by The Blind Boys of Alabama
- Higher Ground, a 2007 album by David Tipper
- Higher Ground, a 1988 album by Vernessa Mitchell

=== Songs ===
- "Higher Ground" (Idde Schultz song), English-language version of "Högre mark", 1995
- "Higher Ground" (Jennifer Rush song), 1989
- "Higher Ground" (Martin Garrix song), 2020
- "Higher Ground" (Rasmussen song), represented Denmark in the Eurovision Song Contest 2018
- "Higher Ground" (Stevie Wonder song), 1973, covered by the Red Hot Chili Peppers in 1989
- "Higher Ground" (UB40 song), 1993
- "Higher Ground", by Amorphis from Far from the Sun
- "Higher Ground", by Imagine Dragons from Mercury – Acts 1 & 2
- "Higher Ground", by Iron Fire from Among the Dead
- "Higher Ground", by Juno Reactor from the video game Frequency
- "Higher Ground", by Odesza from A Moment Apart
- "Higher Ground", by Sasha with Sam Mollison from The Qat Collection
- "Higher Ground", by TNGHT from TNGHT
- "Higher Ground", written by Charles H. Gabriel and Johnson Oatman Jr., 1898

== Organizations ==
- Higher Ground (support group), a Michigan-based HIV/AIDS non-profit
- Higher Ground Productions, a film production company founded in 2018 by Barack and Michelle Obama
- Higher Ground Project, to support children who survived the 2004 Indian Ocean earthquake
- Higher Ground Records, a music label owned by Sony Music
