= Fiskarna i haven =

Single by Idde Schultz

from the album Regn
- Language: Swedish
- English title: "The Fish in the Sea"
- B-side: "Farväl, adjö"
- Released: 1995
- Genre: Swedish pop
- Label: MCA
- Songwriter: Staffan Hellstrand
- Producer: Steffan Hellstrand

Music video
- "Fiskarna i haven" on YouTube

"Fiskarna i haven" (English: "The Fish in the Sea") is a song written by Staffan Hellstrand and recorded by Idde Schultz for the 1995 album, Idde Schultz. It peaked at number one in Sweden and number 10 in Norway. It was given the Rockbjörnen award in the Swedish Song of the Year 1995 category.

== Release ==
"Fiskarna i haven" was released as a single in 1995. The song topped Sweden's Topplistan chart for three weeks in September and October 1995. It also entered the top 10 in Norway, where it peaked at number 10 during the seventh charting period of 1996.

The song was recorded by Väder-Annika as the B-side for the 1996 single "Uteliggardjuren" (English: "Blame It on the Bossa Nova"). On the Smurfhits 1 compilation album from 1996, it was called "Smurfarna i haven".

== Critical reception ==
Music & Media wrote about the song: "A moody pop ballad that despite its Swedish-language lyrics, could find a spot on EHR playlists. The catchy tune is wrapped in an atmospheric and economic production that makes it highly suitable for daytime play."

== Charts ==
=== Weekly charts ===
Chart (1995–1996)	Peak position
Europe (Eurochart Hot 100)	59
Norway (VG-lista)	10
Sweden (Sverigetopplistan)	1

=== Year-end charts ===
Chart (1995)	Position
Sweden (Topplistan)	11
