= Tusen eldar =

Studio album by Freda'
- Released: 1988
- Genre: pop
- Length: circa 41 minutes
- Label: The Record Station
- Producer: Dan Sundquist, Freda'

Freda' chronology
| Välkommen Hero (1986) | Tusen eldar (1988) | Undan för undan (1990) |

Tusen eldar is a 1988 studio album by Freda', released to LP, cassette tape. and CD. The album was rereleased to CD in 2008.

For the album, the band was given a Grammis Award in the category "Religious Music of the Year", but Freda' stated that they didn't play any such music, even if the bandmembers earlier in their career had described themselves as religious.

== Track listing ==
All songs written by Uno Svenningsson & Arne Johansson (except track 1: U. Svenningsson/ A. Johansson/M. Johansson) and (track 2: U. Svenningsson/ A. Johansson/D. Sundqvist)

1. Jag vill se dig lycklig
2. I en annan del av världen
3. Nu är stormen över
4. Dansar i natten
5. Tusen eldar
6. Jag kan se dig
7. Det måste gå
8. Månen i min spegel
9. Bara ett barn
10. Alltid där
11. Skrattet mitt i gråten (CD only)
12. Glädjetåg (CD only)

== Contributors ==
- Uno Svenningsson - vocals, guitar
- Arne Johansson - guitar
- Sam Johansson - keyboard
- Mats Johansson - drums
- guest bassists

== Charts ==
| Chart (1988–1989) | Peak position |
|---|---|
| Swedish Albums (Sverigetopplistan) | 3 |
