= Tro på varann =

Single by Uno Svenningsson & Eva Dahlgren

from the album Uno
- A-side: "Tro på varann"
- B-side: "Elden brann"
- Released: 1994
- Genre: pop
- Length: 4:34
- Label: Record Station
- Songwriter: Uno Svenningsson
- Producer: Dan Sundquist

"Tro på varann" is a song written by Uno Svenningsson and recorded by him as a duet together with Eva Dahlgren on his debut studio album as a solo artist, Uno, released in 1994. The song was also released as a single the same year.

The song charted at Trackslistan for two weeks between 12–19 November 1994. The song also charted at Svensktoppen for eight weeks between 19 November 1994-14 January 1995 peaking at fourth position. "Tro på varann" also charted on the Swedish singles chart, debuting at number 37 and peaking at number 22.

== Other versions ==
Erik Linder recorded the song on his 2009 album Inifrån. Anders Wendin also sang the song during TV4's TV-show Så mycket bättre in 2017.

== Chart positions ==
| Chart (1994) | Peak position |
|---|---|
| Sweden (Sverigetopplistan) | 22 |
