= En människa =

Studio album by Freda'
- Released: 1984
- Recorded: OAL-Studion, Sollentuna, Sweden, April–June 1984
- Genre: pop
- Label: Cantio Records
- Producer: Dan Sundquist

Freda' chronology
En människa (1984)	Välkommen Hero (1986)

En människa is the debut studio album by Swedish pop group Freda', released in 1984.

== Track listing ==
1. En människa
2. Secondhand shop
3. Inget ska få mig rädd
4. Om igen
5. Naken och rädd
6. Nu regnar det
7. Kasperdockor
8. Piccolaflöjt
9. Ut i natten
10. Drick ur mitt glas
11. Mot all logik

== Contributors ==
- Uno Svenningsson - vocals, guitar
- Arne Johansson - guitar, song
- Sam Johansson - keyboard, song
- Per Nordbring - drums
- Jan Nordbring - bass
