= Välkommen Hero =

Studio album by Freda'
- Released: 1986
- Genre: Pop
- Label: Cantio Records
- Producer: Dan Sundquist, Freda'

Freda' chronology
En människa (1984)	Välkommen Hero (1986)	Tusen eldar (1988)

Välkommen Hero is the second studio album by Swedish pop group Freda', released on vinyl, cassette tape. and CD. In 1993, the album was rerelased to CD.

== Track listing ==
Lyrics and music: Uno Svenningsson & Arne Johansson.

1. Ingen kan förklara
2. En dag till
3. Välkommen Hero
4. Ljusa sidan
5. Vi formas och vi lär
6. Doktorn
7. Vindarna
8. Ännu en svala
9. Somnar in
10. Drömmen är min

1993 CD edition bonus tracks (1993):

11. Sanningens magi
12. På tiden att vi träffas
13. Ta min plats

== Contributors ==
=== Freda' ===
- Uno Svenningsson - vocals, guitar, choir
- Arne Johansson - guitar, synthesizer, programming, choir
- Sam Johansson - synth, organ, choir
- Mats Johansson - drums, percussion and synthesizer

=== Other musicians ===
- Dan Sundquist - programming, synthesizer, choir
- Lars Danielsson - electric bass, double bass (1, 2, 3 and 8)
- Jerry Walfridsson - bass (4, 5 and 6)
- Per Nordbring - drums (7 and 10)
- Jan Nordbring - bass (7 and 10)

== Charts ==
Chart (1988)	Peak position
Swedish Albums (Sverigetopplistan)	37
