= ...och stora havet =

Studio album by Jakob Hellman
- Released: 13 February 1989
- Recorded: 1988, EMI Studio 1 and 2 in Stockholm, Sweden
- Genre: Pop, rock
- Length: 42:19
- Label: EMI
- Producer: Dan Sundquist

Jakob Hellman chronology
...och stora havet (1989)	Äntligen borta (2021)

Singles from ...och stora havet
- 1. "Tåg" Released: 9 May 1988; 2. "Vara vänner" Released: 10 January 1989; 3. "Hon har ett sätt" Released: 12 April 1989

...och stora havet ("...and the Great Ocean") is the debut studio album by Swedish pop singer Jakob Hellman. It was released on February 13, 1989 by EMI.

== Overview ==
The album was recorded in 1988 in EMI's studio in Skärmarbrink, Stockholm, and was produced by Dan Sundquist. During the recording, Sundquist worked in parallel on an album by Freda', which had higher priority than the low-budget Hellman album. Sundquist and Hellman also had differing ideas about the sound of the album. Hellman wished to retain the more primitive feel of the 1987 demo that served as the basis of the record, while Sundquist was aiming for more of a pure pop production. Sundquist eventually got what he wanted.

...och stora havet was initially pressed in an edition of 5,000 copies. Once the song "Vara vänner" became a hit, the album was certified gold in the summer of 1989. The album was followed by a tour where Hellman was accompanied by musicians from Eldkvarn, Reeperbahn and Wilmer X.

Lyrically, the album is tinged with a longing to get away. The songs also capture a sense of being young, impatient, misunderstood, and angst-ridden.

The album was released in a remastered edition on CD on June 17, 1998. Nöjesguiden named ...och stora havet the best Swedish album of the century. It is also among the titles in the book Tusen svenska klassiker ("A Thousand Swedish Classics", 2009).

== Track listing ==
All tracks are written by Jakob Hellman, unless otherwise specified

No.	Title	Length
1.	"Tårarna" (The Tears)	3:32
2.	"Du är allt jag vill ha" (You're All I Want)	3:14
3.	"Vara vänner" (Be Friends)	3:39
4.	"Vackert väder" (Beautiful Weather)	3:44
5.	"Vintern dör" (The Winter Dies)	3:34
6.	"Visa mej" (Show Me)	2:24
7.	"Hon har ett sätt" (She Has a Way)	3:20
8.	"Sköra värld" (Fragile World)	3:29
9.	"Tåg" (Train)	3:15
10.	"Stora havet" (The Great Ocean)	3:52
11.	"Glada dagar" (Happy Days)	4:27
12.	"Avundsjuk på dej" (Jealous of You)	3:49
Total length:		42:19

Bonus song on the CD release (1989)
No.	Title	Length
13.	"Som jag vill" (Like I Want)	3:17
Total length:		45:36

Bonus songs on the remastered release (1998)
No.	Title	Writer(s)	Length
13.	"Som jag vill" (Like I Want)		3:17
14.	"Vägar hem" (Ways Home)		5:31
15.	"Hon väntar på mej" (She's Waiting for Me)		2:31
16.	"Tältet" (The Tent) (bonus track on Den flygande holländaren)	Cornelis Vreeswijk	2:47
17.	"Fritiof och Carmencita" (Fritiof and Carmencita)	Evert Taube	3:02
18.	"Tango i Nizza" (Tango in Nice)	Evert Taube	3:23
19.	"Tusen dagar härifrån" (A Thousand Days From Here) (with Perssons Pack, from the album Äkta hjärtan)	Per Persson	4:06
20.	"Hon väntar på mej^{[a]}" (remixed version)		2:31
Total length:			69:27

Notes

- This song is not listed on the back of the album.

== Personnel ==
- Jakob Hellman – vocals, guitar, electric guitar^{[b]}, piano, organ^{[b]}, arrangements and production^{[b]}

=== Additional personnel ===
- Anders Sjögren – tuba
- Dan Sundquist – production, synthesizer, electric piano, minimoog, keyboard, bass, tambourine, backing vocals, wind arrangement, effects and programming
- Dave Castle – clarinet
- Eddie Sjöberg – guitar and mandolin^{[b]}
- Ingemar Dunker – drums^{[b]}
- Jan Zachrisson – keyboards, recording, production and programming on "Tango i Nizza"^{[b]}
- Jesper Lindberg – electric guitar and mandolin^{[b]}
- Kofi Bentsi-Enchill – bass^{[b]}
- Magnus Adell – bass and double bass^{[b]}
- Magnus Lind – accordion and piano^{[b]}
- Magnus Persson – tambourine, xylophone^{[b]}, percussion and triangle
- Mats Bengtsson – piano, accordion^{[b]}
- Mats Borg – drums^{[b]}
- Mats Olausson – piano and organ
- Matts Alsberg – bass and double bass
- Michael Jildestad – trombone
- Pelle Sirén – guitar^{[b]}
- Per Hägglund – synthesizer and effects
- Per Persson – vocals^{[b]}
- Sanken Sandquist – drums^{[b]}
- Titiyo Jah – backing vocals
- Werner Modiggård – drums
- Magnus Nygren – executive producer
- Alar Suurna – mixing

Notes

- Refers to the remastered edition.

== Charts ==
Chart (1989–2001)	Peak position
Swedish Albums (Sverigetopplistan)	9

== Certificates ==
Country	Certificate
Sweden	Platinum
