= Sabina Ddumba =

Swedish singer (born 1994)

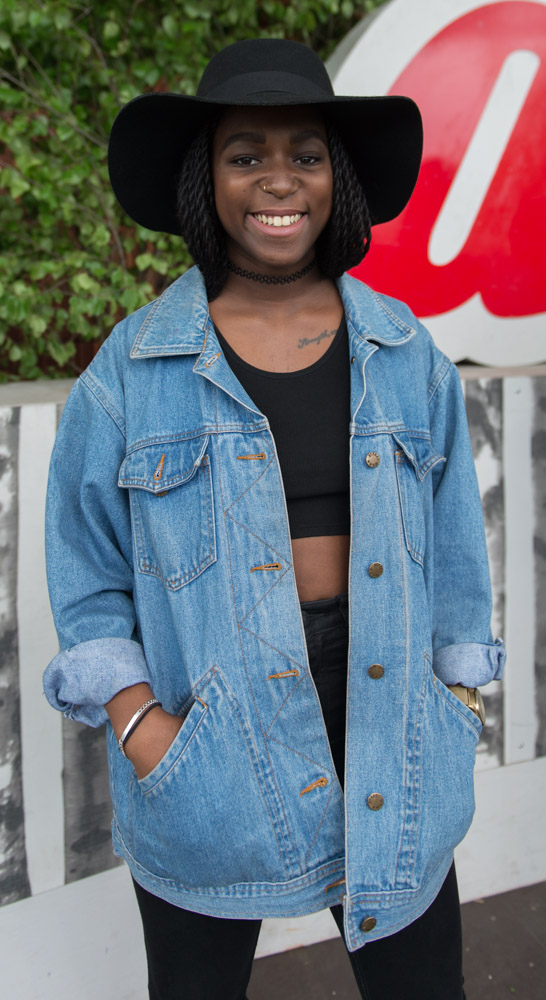
- Ddumba at Allsång på Skansen in 2015

Background information
- Born: 23 February 1994 (age 32); Stockholm, Sweden
- Genres: Pop; soul; gospel
- Occupation: Singer
- Instrument: Vocals
- Label: Warner Bros. Sweden

Sabina Ddumba (born 23 February 1994) is a Swedish singer. Her music has soul, gospel, and R&B influences. Ddumba was a backing vocalist on Katy Perry's song "Walking on Air" in 2013 and has collaborated with artists such as the hip hop band Looptroop Rockers, duo Lorentz & Sakarias and Adam Kanyama in 2012. She is signed to Warner Music. Ddumba released her first single, "Scarred for Life", in 2014, and her second single, "Effortless", in 2015, with the latter being certified platinum. Ddumba appeared in Moraeus med mera in 2014 and performed at Grammisgalan in 2015. She performed at the 2015 Swedish Grammis, and in 2015 won 'Newcomer of the Year' at the Grammisgalan and 2016 P3 Gold Awards.

== Early life ==
Sabina Ddumba was born on 23 February 1994 in Fisksätra, Nacka. She is the sixth child out of eight in her family. Her mother is Ugandan, and when she was eight years old, her mother moved back to Uganda. After listening to traditional Ugandan nursery rhymes and songs, she became interested in melody and phrasing. Ddumba has started writing songs since she was 10. In 2008, at the age of fourteen, she joined the Tensta Gospel Choir, and sang with the group for about six years. It was through this choir that she found singing was her vocation. Her father and relatives wanted her to pursue a more scholarly profession, such as a doctor.

== Musical influences ==
Ddumba was inspired by the Ugandan nursery rhymes and songs she heard when she was a child. She also grew up listening to the hip hop and R&B of the late 1990s. As her family was religious, the gospel music she heard in church on Sundays has also greatly influenced her musical style. Her time with the Tensta Gospel Choir strengthened the influence that gospel music has had on her work.

== Career ==
Ddumba participated in The X Factor Sverige in 2012. Also in 2012, she sang on Adam Kanyama's track, "The Golden Child" and collaborated with the duo Lorentz & Sakarias. In 2013 she sang background vocals for Katy Perry's single "Walking On Air", which was featured on Perry's album, Prism. The same year she collaborated with hip hop group Looptroop Rockers on their song "Sea of Death". In 2014, she released her first single, "Scarred for Life". After the release of this single, in 2015 she signed with Warner Music. In 2015, Ddumba released her second single, "Effortless", which was certified platinum in Sweden. The song was co-written with Carmen Reece, and produced by Nick Ruth and T-Collar. Her single "Not Too Young" was released on 30 October 2015. This single was certified double platinum. In February 2015, Ddumba performed at the Swedish Grammys. In 2016, she performed "Not Too Young" at the P3 Gold Awards, winning the award for Newcomer of the Year. Ddumba will be releasing a follow-up single to "Not Too Young" titled "Not Too Young Pt. II", which will be produced by Wolf Cousins. In the autumn of 2016, she participated in TV4's "So Much Better", where she was among others praised for her interpretation of Uno Svenningsson's song "Vågorna".

In 2023, she and Wilma Lidén played the lead roles in Ruset, Sweden's first series produced for TikTok.

== Discography ==
=== Albums ===
Year	Title	Charts	Certifications
Year	Title	SWE	Certifications
2016	Homeward Bound	10	GLF: Gold
2017	Så mycket bättre 2017 – Tolkningarna	35	
2021	The Forgotten Ones	—	

=== Singles ===
Year	Title	Charts	Certifications	Album
Year	Title	SWE	Certifications	Album
2014	"Scarred for Life"	—	GLF: Gold	Homeward Bound
2015	"Effortless"	57	GLF: Platinum	Homeward Bound
2015	"Not Too Young"	7	GLF: 3× Platinum	Homeward Bound
2016	"Time"	91		Homeward Bound
2016	"Did It for the Fame"	44	GLF: Gold	Homeward Bound
2017	"Vågorna"	19	GLF: Platinum	Så mycket bättre 2017 – Tolkningarna
2017	"It's Been Hurting All the Way with You, Joanna"	77		Så mycket bättre 2017 – Tolkningarna
2017	"Manboy"	27	GLF: Gold	Så mycket bättre 2017 – Tolkningarna
2017	"Varför är kärleken röd"	57		Så mycket bättre 2017 – Tolkningarna
2018	"Small World"	69		Non-album single
2019	"Blow My Mind" (featuring Mr. Eazi)	75		The Forgotten Ones
2019	"Conversation" (featuring Kojo Funds)	— (Note: "Conversation" did not enter the Swedish Singellista Chart, but peaked at number seven on the Swedish Heatseeker Chart.)		The Forgotten Ones
2019	"Forgotten Ones"	— (Note: "Forgotten Ones" did not enter the Swedish Singellista Chart, but peaked at number 10 on the Swedish Heatseeker Chart.)		The Forgotten Ones
2020	"Pick Sides"	—		The Forgotten Ones
2020	"Walk with Me"	—		Non-album single
2021	"Fan va har vi gjort..." (with Danny Saucedo)	19		Non-album single
2021	"Jag vill ha"	—		Non-album single
2021	"Damn Good Woman"	— (Note: "Damn Good Woman" did not enter the Swedish Singellista Chart, but peaked at number three on the Swedish Heatseeker Chart.)		The Forgotten Ones
2021	"Swishers"	— (Note: "Swishers" did not enter the Swedish Singellista Chart, but peaked at number 18 on the Swedish Heatseeker Chart.)		The Forgotten Ones

==== Promotional singles ====
Title	Year	Album
"Love Someone" (Lukas Graham featuring Sabina Ddumba)	2019	Non-album promotional single
