= Sånger för december =

Studio album by Uno Svenningsson & Irma Schultz Keller
- Released: November 22, 2006
- Genre: Christmas
- Length: 53 minutes
- Label: Monitor Entertainment

Sånger för december was released on 22 November 2006, and is a Christmas album by Uno Svenningsson and Irma Schultz Keller, with guests. The Christmas songs were newly-written and newly-translated original songs, but no traditional Christmas songs in Sweden.

== Track listing ==
Names within brackets refer to performer.

1. Sånger för december - Intro
2. När julen rullar över världen (Uno Svenningsson)
3. Jag tror det blir snö i natt (Irma Schultz)
4. Ängel (Uno Svenningsson & Irma Schultz)
5. Första snön är alltid vitast (Uno Svenningsson)
6. Så underbart! (Uno Svenningsson)
7. Ett hus är inget hem (Uno Svenningsson & Irma Schultz)
8. Blank is (Irma Schultz)
9. Vår stad (Kristoffer Jonzon & Irma Schultz)
10. Årets sista dag (Uno Svenningsson & Irma Schultz)
11. Tungan emot stolpen (Wille Crafoord)
12. Ett fotografi (Uno Svenningsson)
13. TV-mannen (Uno Svenningsson)
14. På nakna fötter (Irma Schultz)
15. Sånger för december / En frälsare är född - Outro (Bob Hansson)

== Charts ==
Chart (2006)	Peak position
Swedish Albums (Sverigetopplistan)	16
