= Anna Stadling =

Swedish musical artist (born 1970)

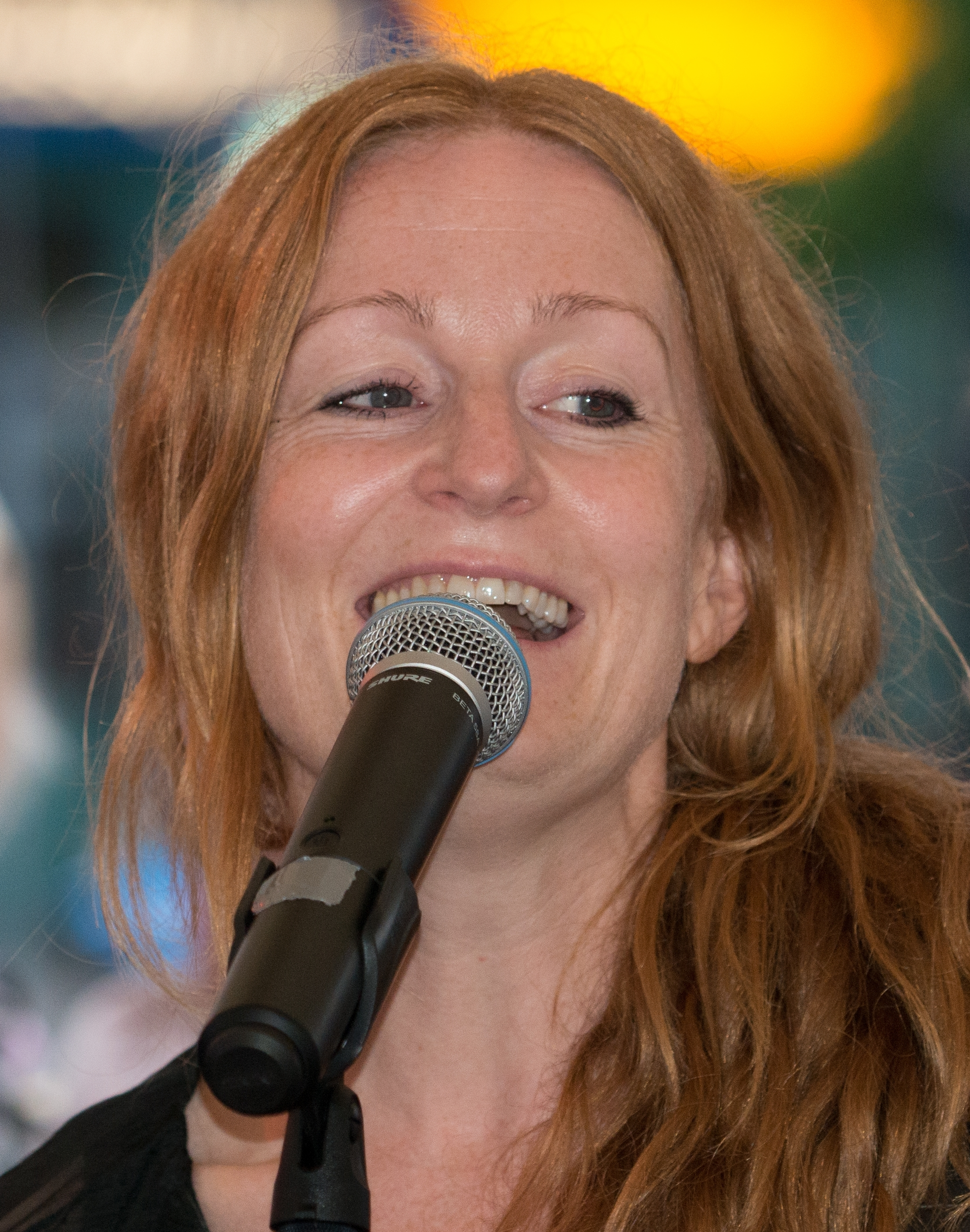
- Anna Stadling in July 2014

Background information
- Born: 11 July 1970 (age 55); Sundsvall, Sweden
- Genres: Pop, rock
- Occupations: Singer, musician
- Instrument: Guitar

Anna Stadling (born 11 July 1970 in Sundsvall, Sweden) is a Swedish musical artist. She contributes with background vocals and plays the guitar in the band Hovet. She has also played with Staffan Hellstrand and worked together with Idde Schultz. She has scored various successes at the Swedish charts.

== Discography ==
=== Solo ===
- 1999 – Det känns
- 2010 – E4 mot norr
- 2013 – Stadling/Cash (Anna Stadling covers Johnny Cash in English)

=== Anna + Idde ===
- 2005 – Anna + Idde (EP)
- 2006 – Vägar hem
- 2008 – Hjärtat fullt

=== Together with Karl-Magnus Fredriksson ===
- 2011 – Ögonblick och evighet
