= God morgon (Uno & Irma song) =

Single by Uno Svenningsson & Irma Schultz Keller
- A-side: "God morgon"
- B-side: " God morgon" (karaoke version)
- Released: 5 March 2007
- Genre: pop
- Label: Monitor Entertainment Group
- Songwriters: Staffan Hellstrand, Uno Svenningsson

"God morgon" is a song written by Uno Svenningsson and Staffan Hellstrand, and performed by Uno Svenningsson and Irma Schultz Keller at Melodifestivalen 2007. The song participated in the semifinal in the town of Jönköping on 3 February 2007, from where it reached Andra chansen. Once there the song failed to reach the final inside the Stockholm Globe Arena. The song's lyrics describes morning arriving in a town. On 5 March 2007, the single for the song was released, peaking at number 18 on the Swedish Singles Chart.

The song entered Svensktoppen on 15 April 2007, reaching the 7th position. The upcoming week, it had fallen to the 9th position, before getting knocked out the upcoming week.

During Melodifestivalen 2012 the song was one of the "Tredje chansen" numbers.

== Single track listing ==
1. God morgon
2. God morgon (karaoke version)

== Charts ==
Chart (2007)	Peak position
Sweden (Sverigetopplistan)	18
