= Beväpna dig med tanken =

Studio album by Freda'
- Released: 21 November 2014
- Genre: pop
- Label: Ninetone

Freda' chronology
Ett mysterium (2010)	Beväpna dig med tanken (2014)

Beväpna dig med tanken is a Freda' studio album released on 21 November 2014.

== Track listing ==
1. Beväpna dig med tanken
2. Kärleken bär
3. Före tystnaden
4. Följer stegen bakåt
5. Ta det som det är
6. Vägen till ett hjärta
7. Det vi ger
8. Vi bär på samma dröm
9. Genom nätterna
10. Lämnade allt för vintern

== Charts ==
Chart (2014)	Peak position
Swedish Albums (Sverigetopplistan)	44
