= Alla behöver =

Studio album by Freda'
- Released: 1993
- Genre: Swedish pop
- Length: 47 minutes
- Label: The Record Station
- Producer: Kaj Erixon; Freda'

Freda' chronology
| Undan för undan (1990) | Alla behöver (1993) | Samling 83-93 (1993) |

Alla behöver, is a 1993 Freda' studio album, released to LP, cassette tape and CD. The album was rereleased to CD in 2008.

== Track listing ==
Lyrics and music: Uno Svenningsson & Arne Johansson.

1. Vart är vi på väg?
2. Så länge jag lever
3. Låt det alltid finnas
4. Öppen för dig
5. Det som gör mig lycklig
6. Stanna hos dig
7. Alla behöver
8. Mina ögon vill se
9. För din skull
10. Du och ingen annan

== Contributors ==
=== Freda' ===
- Uno Svenningsson - vocals, guitar
- Arne Johansson - guitar, keyboard, omnichord
- Mats Johansson - drums, percussion

=== Other musicians ===
- Mats "Limbo" Lindberg - bass
- Sven Lindvall - bass
- Stoffe Wallman - synthesizer
- Johan Vävare - synthesizer

== Charts ==
| Chart (1993) | Peak position |
|---|---|
| Swedish Albums (Sverigetopplistan) | 7 |
