= Undan för undan =

Studio album by Freda'
- Released: 1990
- Genre: Pop
- Length: 42 minutes
- Label: The Record Station
- Producer: Kaj Erixon, Freda'

Freda' chronology
Tusen eldar (1988)	Undan för undan (1990)	Alla behöver (1993)

Undan för undan is a 1990 studio album by Freda'. For the album, the band was awarded a Grammis award in the "Rock group of the year" category.

== Track listing ==
Lyrics and music: Uno Svenningsson & Arne Johansson.

1. Undan för undan
2. Allt man kan önska sig
3. Undrar vem du är
4. Överallt
5. Erika
6. Triumfens ögonblick
7. Det saknas lite värme
8. Jag är på väg
9. Kom kom
10. Kan inte se dig här

== Contributors (Freda') ==
- Uno Svenningsson - vocals and guitar
- Arne Johansson - guitars, keyboard and omnichord
- Mats Johansson - drums and percussion

== Other musicians ==
- Sam Johansson - keyboard
- Johan Vävare - moog, keyboard
- Mats "Limbo" Lindberg - warwickbass
- Lasse Danielsson - bass (2, 3)
- Niklas Medin - organ, piano (2, 7)
- Ulf, Leif, Mats - wind instrument (7)

== Charts ==
Chart (1990–1991)	Peak position
Swedish Albums (Sverigetopplistan)	3
