= December - En svensk jul =

December: En svensk jul

Studio album by Uno Svenningsson & Irma Schultz Keller
- Released: 2011
- Recorded: Studio 4, Radiohuset
- Genre: Christmas
- Length: 32 minutes
- Label: Universal Music
- Producer: Lars Hansson

December: En svensk jul is a Christmas album by Uno Svenningsson and Irma Schultz Keller, released in 2011.

== Track listing ==
1. Viskar en bön (Peter Hallström, Mauro Scocco)
2. Stilla natt (Stille Nacht, Heilige nacht) (Peter Hallström, Mauro Scocco)
3. När det lider mot jul (Ruben Liljefors, Jeanna Oterdahl)
4. När julen rullar över världen (Uno Svenningsson, Patrik Frisk)
5. Jul, jul, strålande jul (Hugo Hammarström, Edvard Evers)
6. En vinterpromenad (Irma Schultz Keller)
7. Önskar dig en stilla natt (Bo Kasper)
8. Stunder av lycka (Uno Svenningsson)
9. Kom du nånsin iväg (Leonard Cohen, Ulf Lundell)
10. Ser du stjärnan i det blå (When You Wish Upon a Star) (Leigh Harline, S. S. Wilson)

== Personnel ==
- Uno Svenningsson – vocals
- Irma Schultz Keller – vocals
- Fredrik Hermansson – keyboard
- Andreas Hourdakis – guitar
- Lars "Billy" Hansson – production

== Charts ==
Chart (2011)	Peak position
Sweden	53
