= Under ytan =

1994 Uno Svenningsson song

Single by Uno Svenningsson

from the album Uno
- A-side: "Under ytan"
- B-side: "Rymd att älska i"
- Released: 1994
- Genre: Swedish pop
- Label: The Record Station
- Songwriter: Uno Svenningsson
- Producer: Dan Sundquist

Uno Svenningsson singles chronology
"Tro på varann" (1994)	"Under ytan" (1994)	"Skymtar för en stund" (1995)

"Under ytan" (English: Under the Surface) is a song written by Uno Svenningsson and recorded by him for his debut album as a solo artist, Uno, released in 1994. It was released as a single the same year. The song, which opens with the cello being played, was also used by insurance companies in an anti-violence campaign. In 1998, the song was recorded by Blues.

== Charts ==
=== Blues version ===
Chart (1998–1999)	Peak position
Sweden (Sverigetopplistan)	6

== Other recordings ==
"Under ytan"

Single by Loreen
- Released: December 18, 2015
- Recorded: 2015
- Genre: Electronic; synth-pop
- Length: 3:59
- Label: Warner Music Sweden
- Songwriter: Uno Svenningsson

Loreen singles chronology
"I'm in It with You" (2015)	"Under ytan" (2015)	"Get Into It" (2016)

Loreen released a cover of the song as a single on 18 December 2015, simultaneously performing it live on TV on at Svenska Hjältar-Galan. It was her first single released in Swedish. Loreen turned the guitar pop track into a moody, electronic ballad which starts out with just her voice and some synths, but halfway through explodes with a lush production and more vocal power.

Michael from 'A Bit of Pop Music said; "This type of moody electro ballads suits her powerful and mystical sounding vocals the best." requesting more of this on her second album.

Scandipop said; ""Under Ytan" [is] a stark and dramatic new production that builds into something special."

In 2017, Kikki Danielsson recorded the song during Så mycket bättre. The song was then called "At the Border", depicting the situation of refugees throughout the world.
