= Hjärtat fullt =

Studio album by Anna Stadling & Idde Schultz
- Released: January 2008
- Recorded: Münchenbryggeriet, Stockholm, Sweden 2007
- Genre: pop, rock
- Label: Olga
- Producer: Idde Schultz, Anna Stadling

Anna Stadling & Idde Schultz chronology
Vägar hem (2006)	Hjärtat fullt (2008)

Hjärtat fullt is a 2008 studio album by Anna Stadling & Idde Schultz.

== Track listing ==
1. Chaufför (Senor) (Bob Dylan, Christer Sunesson)
2. En plats i solen (Ulf Stureson)
3. Där dimma döljer dag (Dimming of the Day) (Richard Thompson, Ola Magnell)
4. Vind i seglen (Ulf Stureson)
5. Fyra dörrar till min syster (Staffan Hellstrand)
6. Jordeliv (Ulf Stureson)
7. Tokyo line (Anders F. Rönnblom)
8. Huvet fullt (Ulf Stureson)
9. Genom glas (Josef Zachrisson, Ulf Robertsson)
10. Ditt mörka hår (Ulf Sturesson)
11. Allt det du drömde om (Anna Stadling, Idde Schultz, Kajsa Grytt)
12. För dig för mig (Anders F. Rönnblom)

== Contributors ==
- Anna Stadling – vocals, guitar, producer
- Idde Schultz – vocals, piano, producer
- Pecka Hammarstedt – guitar, piano, organ, drums, percussion, horn, producer
- Josef Zachrisson – bass, guitar, piano
- Mathias Blomdahl – guitar

== Charts ==
Chart (2008)	Peak position
Sweden (Sverigetopplistan)	32
