= Explodera =

2000 song by Staffan Hellstrand

Single by Staffan Hellstrand

from the album Staffan Hellstrands bästa
- A-side: "Explodera"
- B-side: "Explodera" (PJ-remix)
- Released: 2000
- Genre: pop rock
- Label: EMI
- Songwriter: Staffan Hellstrand

"Explodera" is a song written and recorded by Staffan Hellstrand, acting as official fight song for the Sweden men's national team during the 2000 UEFA European Soccer Championship in Belgium and the Netherlands. The single peaked at number eight on the Swedish Singles Chart, and also appeared on the 2000 compilation album Staffan Hellstrands bästa.

The song also charted at Trackslistan for six weeks between 6 May-10 June 2000, peaking at number six. The song also received a Svensktoppen test on 27 May 2000, but failed to enter the chart.

In 2004, the song was recorded by Fässbergs IF.

== Contributors ==
- Staffan Hellstrand, vocals, keyboard
- Michael Sellers - guitar
- Christer Jansson, Conny Städe - drums
- Sweden men's national football team - vocals

== Charts ==
Chart (2000)	Peak position
Sweden (Sverigetopplistan)	6
