= Uno (Uno Svenningsson album) =

Studio album by Uno Svenningsson
- Released: 1994
- Genre: Pop
- Label: The Record Station

Uno Svenningsson chronology
Uno (1994)	..due! (1996)

Uno is the debut studio album by Swedish singer-songwriter Uno Svenningsson, released in 1994. It proved successful in Sweden, peaking at number two on the Swedish Albums Chart.

== Track listing ==
1. Tid att gå vidare - 4.32
2. Till fjärran land - 4.29
3. Tro på varann (with Eva Dahlgren) - 4.34
4. Om du bara visste - 4.30
5. Under ytan - 3.22
6. Nära sanningen - 3.43
7. Evigt unga - 4.02
8. Skymtar för en stund - 3.39
9. Kommer aldrig att förstå dig - 4.15
10. Stannar kvar i min dröm - 4.51

== Singles ==
- Tid att gå vidare
- Under ytan
- Tro på varann (with Eva Dahlgren)
- Skymtar för en stund

== Charts ==
Chart (1994–1999)	Peak position
Swedish Albums (Sverigetopplistan)	2
