= Efva Attling =

Swedish jewelry designer (born 1952)

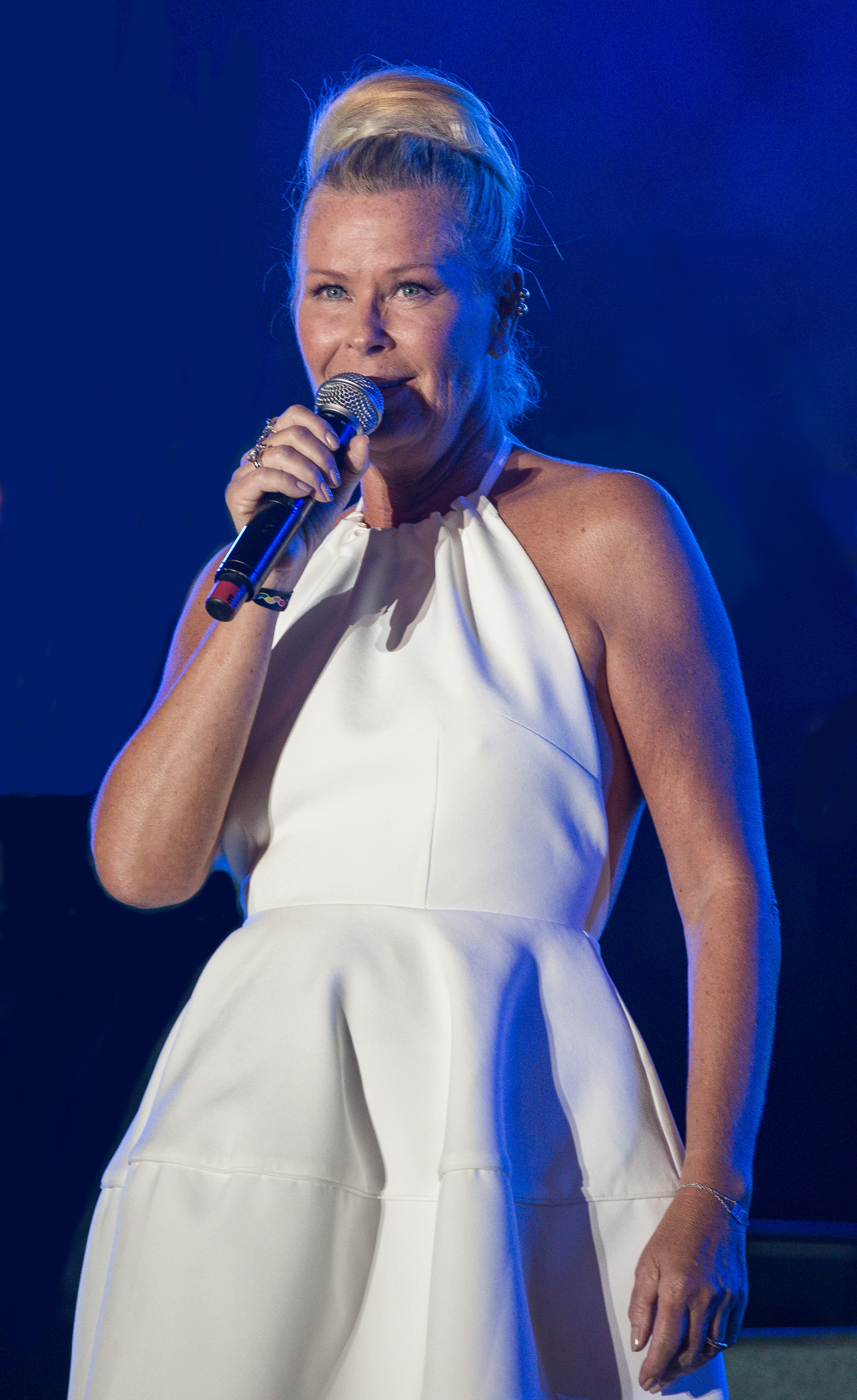
- Efva Attling at Stockholm Pride 2014
- Born: Efva Katarina Attling; 18 February 1952 (age 74)
- Style: Designer, Singer
- Spouses: Thomas Wiklund (m. 1977; div. 1980) Niklas Strömstedt (m. 1985; div. 1995) Eva Dahlgren (m. 2009)
- Children: 2
- Website: www.efvaattling.com

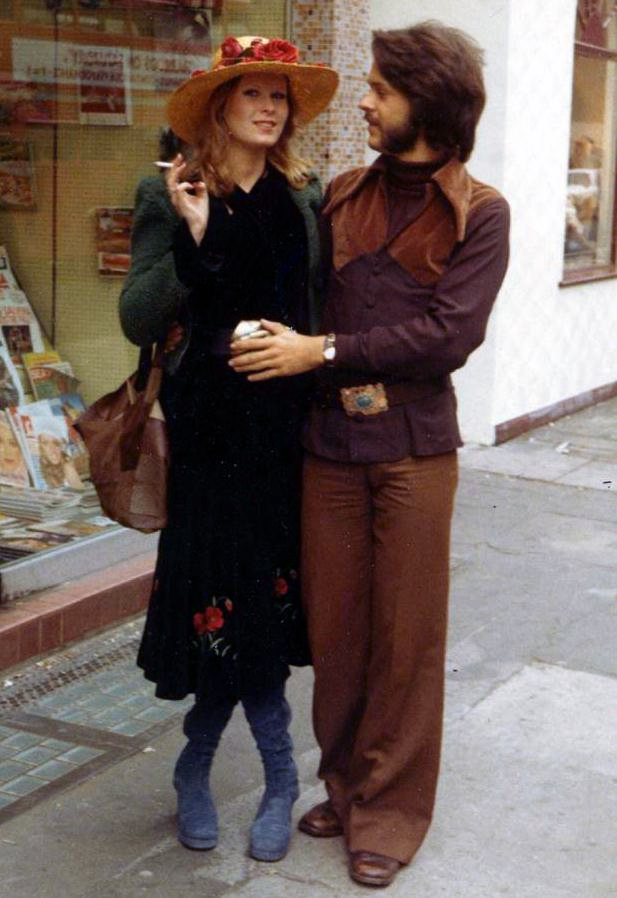
Attling modelling in London in 1971

Efva Katarina Attling (born 18 February 1952) is a Swedish silversmith and jewellery designer.

== Early career ==
In the early 1980s, she played in the band "X Models" and released the hit single Två av oss ("Two of us").

She worked as a professional model for twelve years after being spotted by Eileen Ford. She was also noted for being one of Sweden's best professional disco dancers.

== Silversmith and jewellery designer ==
Attling designed for Levi's and H&M and in the mid-1990s she started her own line of jewellery. Her pendant "Homo Sapiens" was worn by Madonna in 1999, and Meryl Streep is also known to wear her jewellery.

She has stores in Sweden, Norway, Finland and New York. The estimated turnover for her company was SEK 100 million in 2011.

== Personal life ==
Attling was married to pop singer/writer Niklas Strömstedt, with whom she has two children, from 1985 to 1995. She entered a civil union with Swedish pop singer Eva Dahlgren in 1996. They were married in 2009 after Sweden passed its gender neutral marriage law.

== Awards ==
Attling has received a medal from the Royal Swedish Patriotic Society in April 2011 for distinguishing herself as an internationally known jewellery designer.
