= Ett mysterium =

Studio album by Freda'
- Released: Late January 2010
- Recorded: Foundland Studio, Jönköping, Sweden, 2009
- Genre: pop
- Length: 45 minutes
- Label: Universal

Freda' chronology
Det bästa med Freda' & Uno (2009)	Ett mysterium (2010)	Äntligen här igen (2010)

Ett mysterium is a studio album by Freda', recorded for the 2009–2010 band reunion, 16 years following the group's breakup. The album was recorded inside band guitarist Arne Johansson's studio in the town of Jönköping in Sweden, and was released in late January 2010.

== Track listing ==
Lyrics and music: Uno Svenningsson & Arne Johansson

1. Äntligen här igen
2. Gå aldrig ensam
3. En dag i taget
4. Bäste vän
5. Följ ditt hjärta till slut
6. Så lekande lätt
7. Ingen annan än du
8. En sol på jorden
9. Ett mysterium
10. Finns det en plats för mig?

== Contributors ==
- Uno Svenningsson
- Arne Johansson
- Mats Johansson

== Other musicians ==
- Philip Ekström – choir and various instruments
- Kristoffer Wallman – keyboards on track 6 and 7
- Mart Hallek – violins on track 4

== Charts ==
Chart (2010)	Peak position
Sweden (Sverigetopplistan)	11
