= Vad man gör (och inte gör) =

Kärlek är inget spel

Studio album by Idde Schultz
- Released: 1997
- Genre: Swedish pop
- Length: circa 44 minutes
- Label: Universal

Idde Schultz chronology
Idde Schultz (1995)	Kärlek är inget spel (1997)

Vad man gör (och inte gör) is a 1997 studio album by Idde Schultz.

== Track listing ==
Lyrics and music by Idde Schultz except where noted

1. Hunger
2. Riktigt på riktigt
3. Faller (J. Pihlgren, L. Lövgren)
4. Innan mitt hjärta fick sin form (Staffan Hellstrand)
5. Syner
6. Kan bara vara jag
7. Någonting någon annanstans
8. Bara när jag blundar
9. Vattenfärger
10. Vad man gör (och inte gör)
11. Vi kan vara överallt
12. Förvånad

== Contributors ==
- Idde Schultz – vocals, mellotron
- Fredrik Blank – guitar
- Håkan Bacchus – bass
- Nino Keller – drums

with others

== Charts ==
Chart (1997)	Peak position
Sverige	20
