= Vägar hem =

Studio album by Anna Stadling & Idde Schultz
- Released: 2006
- Recorded: Sidelake Studios, Sundsvall, Swedenl, November–December 2005
- Genre: Pop, rock
- Length: circa 42 minutes
- Label: Amigo

Anna Stadling & Idde Schultz chronology
Vägar hem (2006)	Hjärtat fullt (2008)

Vägar hem is a 2006 studio album by Anna Stadling & Idde Schultz. On the album, they perform less famous Swedish pop/rock songs from the 1970s and 1980s.

== Track listing ==
1. Vägar hem
2. Inga gränser
3. Bröllopsdag
4. Sjunde himlen
5. Då känns det lite lugnare
6. Drömde
7. Kärlekens hundar
8. Öde stranden
9. Små duvor
10. Gnistrande snö
11. Ser du
12. Blå andetag
