= Vox Archangeli =

Vox Archangeli is a Swedish musical band combining original Gregorian chants from early medieval times with modern electronic sounds. Members are Anna Pihl Lindén, Veikko Kiiver and Pär Lindén, all on vocals, with Pär Lindén also playing the flute. The inspiration for Vox Archangelis music comes from a wide range of musical influences, from classical and folk music, through to pop and rock. They are signed to Heart Song Records. Distribution is by Plugged Music and worldwide through X5 Music.

They are famous for their Sanctus series dedicated to various angel. Their debut album was Sanctus: Michael in 2009 produced by the Grammy winning Dan Sundquist, with the follow-up album continuing on the Sanctus project was 2010 album Sanctus: Gabriel produced by Daniel Palm and the third album Sancts:Raphael produced by Peter Nordahl and Moh Denebi.

In addition to the vocal tracks introducing a new musical genre called Gregorian Lounge Music, their music features instrumental air movements, created in co-operation with Jonas Strömberg at Slowbeat Studio and representing a continuing theme with 4 movements in Sanctus: Michael, also 4 in Sanctus: Gabriel and a further 5 in Sanctus: Raphael.

== Discography ==
| Album Title | Album details | Peak chart positions | Certifications | Track list |
| Album Title | Album details | SWE | Certifications | Track list |
|---|---|---|---|---|
| Sanctus: Michael | Released: 11 September 2009; Label: Heart Song Records; Format: CD | 27 | | 1. Archangelus Michael; 2. Miserere Mei; 3. Sanctus; 4. Caritas; 5. Air Movement I 6. Air Movement Ii; 7. Air Movement Iii; 8. Air Movement Iv |
| Sanctus: Gabriel | Released: 22 January 2010; Label: Heart Song Records; Format: CD | 13 | | 1. Deus; 2. Ego Sum; 3. Ingresso; 4. Archangelus Gabriel; 5. Pax; 6. Air Movement V: Deus; 7. Air Movement Vi: Ego Sum; 8. Air Movement Vii: Ingresso; 9. Air Movement Viii: Archangelus Gabriel |
| Sanctus: Raphael | Released: 11 November 201; Label: Heart Song Records; Format: CD | 26 | | 1. Alleluia Raphael; 2. Filium Dei; 3. Air Movement X: Archangelus Raphael; 4. Now We Are Free; 5. Air Movement Xi: Alleluia Raphael; 6. Air Movement Xii: Filium Dei; 7. Archangelus Raphael; 8. Air Movement Xiii: Filium Dei; 9. Air Movement Xiv: Now We Are Free |

=== Singles ===
| Year | Single | Peak chart positions | Album |
| Year | Single | SWE | Album |
|---|---|---|---|
| 2010 | "Archangelus Gabriel" | 35 | Sanctus: Gabriel |
| 2011 | "Sapienta" | 18 | Non-album release |

Other non-charting singles

- 2011: "We Are Free" (Vox Archangeli's version of theme from Gladiator
