= Idde Schultz (album) =

Studio album by Idde Schultz
- Released: 1995
- Recorded: Studio Decibel, May–June 1995
- Genre: Swedish pop
- Length: 39 minutes
- Label: MCA Music Entertainment
- Producer: Staffan Hellstrand

Idde Schultz chronology
Idde Schultz (1995)	Vad man gör (och inte gör) (1997)

Idde Schultz is a 1995 studio album by Idde Schultz and her debut album as a solo artist.

== Track listing ==
Lyrics and music by Idde Schultz except where noted.

1. I min famn
2. (Du var) allt jag ville ha (Olle Ljungström/Andreas Mattsson)
3. Farväl - Adjö (Idde Schultz/Staffan Hellstrand)
4. Fiskarna i haven
5. Småstadsskvaller (Staffan Hellstrand/Fredrik Blank)
6. Skärsår (Schultz/Hellstrand)
7. Högre mark
8. Du såg aldrig mig
9. Jag väljer mina drömmar själv (Ljungström/Hellstrand/Schultz)
10. Vita hus och lila slätter
11. Den andra dagen i maj

== Contributors ==
- Idde Schultz - vocals
- Staffan Hellstrand - guitar, organ, harmonica
- Magnus Persson - drums, percussion, didgeridoo
- Matts Alsberg - bass
- Fredrik Blank - guitar
- SNYKO - musicians

== Charts ==
Chart (1995–1996)	Peak position
Norge	7
Sverige	2
