= Vågorna =

2001 single by Uno Svenningsson

Single by Uno Svenningsson

from the album I det osynliga
- Language: Swedish
- B-side: "Vågorna (Akustisk)"
- Released: 2001
- Studio: Atlantis, Decibel (Stockholm)
- Genre: Pop
- Length: 3:56
- Label: Warner
- Songwriter: Uno Svenningsson
- Producer: Peter Kvint

Uno Svenningsson singles chronology
"Festen" (1999)	"Vågorna" (2001)	"Inte en gång till" (2001)

"Vågorna" is a song by Swedish singer-songwriter Uno Svenningsson from his fourth studio album, I det osynliga (2001).

== Track listing and formats ==
- Swedish CD single
1. "Vågorna" – 3:56
2. "Vågorna" (Akustisk) – 3:57

== Credits and personnel ==
- Uno Svenningsson – songwriter, vocals, arranger
- Peter Kvint – producer, arranger
- Hoffe Stannow – mastering
- Adam Kviman – mixing
- Lennart Östlund – mixing

Credits and personnel adapted from the I det osynliga album and CD single liner notes.

== Charts ==
Weekly chart performance for "Vågorna"
Chart (2015)	Peak position
Sweden (Sverigetopplistan)	80

== Sabina Ddumba version ==
"Vågorna"

Single by Sabina Ddumba

from the EP Så mycket bättre 2017 – Tolkningarna
- Released: 21 October 2017
- Length: 3:51
- Label: Warner
- Songwriter: Uno Svenningsson

Sabina Ddumba singles chronology
"Did It for the Fame" (2016)	"Vågorna" (2017)	"It's Been Hurting All the Way with You, Joanna" (2017)

In 2017, Swedish singer Sabina Ddumba recorded a cover of "Vågorna".

=== Track listing and formats ===
- Digital single
1. "Vågorna" – 3:51

=== Charts ===
Chart (2017–2018)	Peak position
Sweden (Sverigetopplistan)	19

=== Release history ===
Release dates and formats for "Det är ju dej jag går och väntar på"
Region	Date	Format(s)	Label(s)	Ref.
Various	21 October 2017	Digital download; streaming	Warner	
