= Högre mark =

Single by Idde Schultz
- A-side: "Högre mark"
- B-side: "Småstadsskvaller"
- Released: 1995
- Genre: Swedish pop
- Songwriter: Staffan Hellstrand

"Högre mark" is a song written by Staffan Hellstrand, and recorded by Idde Schultz on 1995 album Idde Schultz, and released as a single the same year. Schultz also recorded a version of the song with English lyrics, "Higher Ground", which was released as a single in 1996 and was commercially well-received worldwide.

The song has also been recorded by Staffan Hellstrand himself, on the 2000 compilation album Staffan Hellstrands bästa.

The song has also been recorded by Sara Wikström on her 2007 album Sara Wikström.

The song also charted at Svensktoppen, where it stayed for two weeks between 25 November-2 December 1995, placed at eight and sixth position, before leaving chart.
