= John Denver filmography =

The following is John Denver's comprehensive filmography, listed from the newest to the oldest, organized in tiers in accordance with the dates of recording or airing (in the television category). The filmography does not include any appearances of Denver post-1997 (excluding music usage and documentaries).

== Filmography ==
=== Acting ===
1. Walking Thunder (1997) … John McKay
2. Higher Ground (1988) … Jim Clayton (TV movie)
3. Foxfire (1987) … Dillard Nations (TV movie)
4. The Christmas Gift (1986) … George Billings (TV movie)
5. The Disney Sunday Movie
  - Episode "The Leftovers" (1986) … Max Sinclair (TV movie)
6. Fire and Ice (1986) … Narrator
7. Oh, God! (1977) … Jerry Landers
8. McCloud (1974)
  - Episode "The Colorado Cattle Caper" … Deputy Dewey Cobb (TV series)
9. Owen Marshall, Counselor at Law (1973)
  - Episode "The Camerons Are a Special Clan" … Clark (TV series)

=== Soundtrack ===
1. Logan Lucky (2017) [song (co-written) "Take Me Home, Country Roads", "Some Days Are Diamonds (Some Days Are Stone)"]
2. Kingsman: The Golden Circle (2017) [song (co-written) "Take Me Home, Country Road"]
3. Alien: Covenant (2017) [song (co-written) "Take Me Home, Country Roads"]
4. Okja (2017) (song "Annie's Song")
5. Free Fire (2017) (song "Annie's Song")
6. John Denver: A Song's Best Friend (2004) (songs)
7. Catch Me If You Can (2002) (from "Leaving on a Jet Plane")
8. The Wedding Planner (2001) (song "Annie's Song")
9. Take Me Home: The John Denver Story (2000) (TV) (songs)
10. Final Destination (2000) (song "Rocky Mountain High")
11. Armageddon (1998) (song "Leaving on a Jet Plane")
12. My Best Friend's Wedding (1997) (song "Annie's Song")
13. The Rock (1996) (song "Leaving on a Jet Plane")
14. Whisper of the Heart (1995) (song "Take Me Home, Country Roads")
15. Son in Law (1993) (song "Thank God I'm a Country Boy")
16. The Christmas Gift (1986) (TV) (song "Love Again")
17. The Music for UNICEF Concert: A Gift of Song (1979) (song "Rhymes and Reasons")
18. Centennial (1978) (song "I Guess He'd Rather Be in Colorado" performed by Merle Haggard)
19. Sunshine (1975) TV series (theme)
20. The Bears and I (1974) {song: 'Sweet Surrender'}
21. The New Land (1974) TV series
22. Sierra (1974) TV series
23. Sunshine (1973) (TV)
24. Gospel Road: A Story of Jesus (1973)

=== Production ===
1. Higher Ground (1988) (TV) (co-executive producer)
2. Rocky Mountain Holiday with John Denver and the Muppets (1982) (TV) (producer)
3. John Denver: Music and the Mountains (1981) (TV) (producer)

=== Writing ===
1. Take Me Home: The John Denver Story (2000) (TV) (book Take Me Home)

=== Television ===
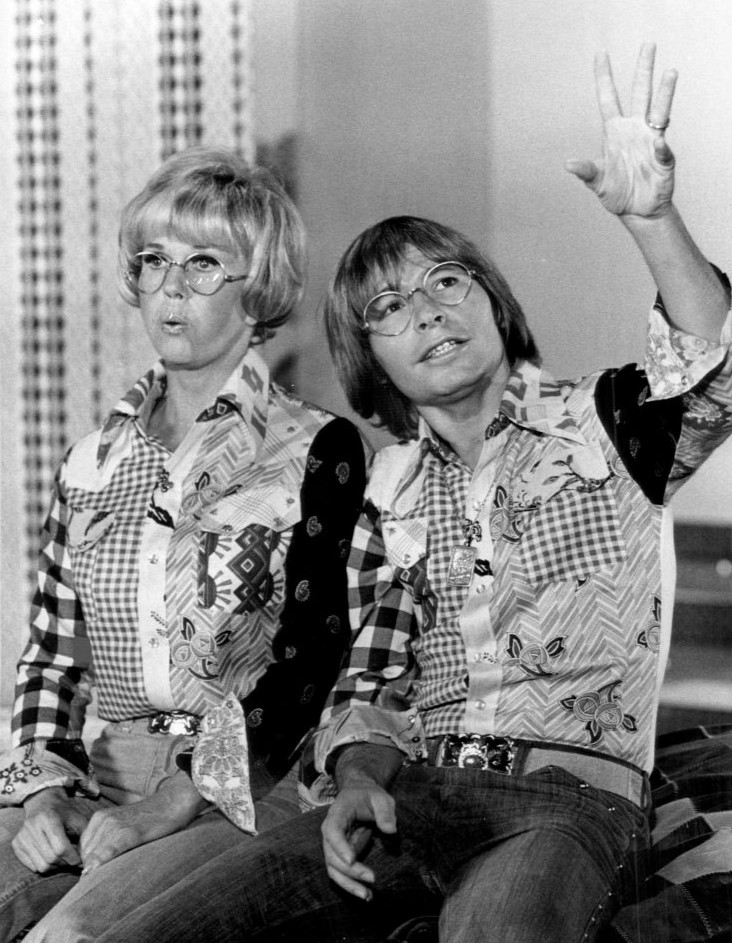
With Doris Day on the CBS TV special Doris Day Today (1975)

1. John Denver: A Song's Best Friend (2004) (TV Movie/Documentary) (songs) … Himself, starring
2. Nature
  - John Denver: Let This Be a Voice (1998) TV episode … Himself
3. John Denver: A Portrait (1998) (V) … Himself
4. Today
  - Episode dated 19 December 1996 (1996) TV episode … Himself
  - Episode dated 15 June 1996 (1996) TV episode … Himself
  - Episode dated 8 April 1991 (1991) TV episode … Himself
  - Episode dated 27 March 1986 (1986) TV episode … Himself
  - Episode dated 30 March 1984 (1984) TV episode … Himself
  - Episode dated 5 July 1982 (1982) TV episode … Himself
5. John Denver: The Wildlife Concert (1995) (TV) … Himself
6. America Comes to Graceland (1993) (TV) … Himself
7. Montana Christmas Skies (1991) (TV) … Himself
8. Aspen (1991) … Himself
9. The Muppets Celebrate Jim Henson (1990) (TV) … Himself
10. The Tonight Show Starring Johnny Carson
  - Episode dated 19 October 1990 (1990) TV episode … Himself
  - Episode dated 3 December 1987 (1987) TV episode … Himself
  - Episode dated 3 March 1986 (1986) TV episode … Himself
  - Episode dated 29 May 1985 (1985) TV episode … Himself
  - Episode dated 20 December 1984 (1984) TV episode … Himself
  - Episode dated 26 August 1983 (1983) TV episode … Himself - Guest host
  - Episode dated 4 May 1982 (1982) TV episode … Himself
  - Episode dated 16 October 1978 (1978) TV episode … Himself - Guest host
11. NBC Nightly News
  - Episode dated 24 August 1989 (1989) TV episode … Himself
12. The Kennedy Center Honors: A Celebration of the Performing Arts (1988) (TV) … Himself
13. The 15th Annual American Music Awards (1988) (TV) … Himself
14. John Denver's Christmas in Aspen (1988) (TV) … Host
15. Julie Andrews: The Sound of Christmas (1987) (TV) … Himself
16. Magnum, P.I. (1987) (TV)
  - Episode "Limbo" … (performer: "Looking for Space")
17. Farm Aid '87 (1987) (TV) … Himself
18. Liberty Weekend (1986) (TV) … Himself
19. The 27th Annual Grammy Awards (1985) (TV) … Himself - host
20. In Concert at the Met (1984) (TV) … Himself
21. Salute to Lady Liberty (1984) (TV) … Himself
22. Sixth Annual Ski Pro Am (March 9–14,19 1983) (TV) ... Himself - host
23. The 25th Annual Grammy Awards (1983) (TV) … Himself – host
24. The 24th Annual Grammy Awards (1982) (TV) … Himself – host
25. Fifth Annual Ski Pro Am (1982) (TV) ... Himself - host
26. Rocky Mountain Holiday with John Denver and the Muppets (1982) (TV) … Himself
27. John Denver: Live at Red Rocks (1982) Televised concert … Himself, starring
28. John Denver: Music and the Mountains (1981) (TV) … Himself
29. John Denver with His Special Guest George Burns: Two of a Kind (1981) (TV) … Himself
30. SportsWorld John Denver Celebrity 4th Annual Ski Pro Am (1981) (TV) ... Himself - host
31. The Tomorrow Show
  - Episode dated 3 December 1980 (1980) TV episode … Himself
32. The John Davidson Show
  - Episode dated 30 October 1980 (1980) TV episode … Himself
33. Third Annual Ski Pro Am (March 4–9, 1980) (TV) ... Himself - host
34. John Denver and the Muppets: A Christmas Together (1979) (TV) … Himself – host
35. The 3rd Barry Manilow Special (1979) (TV) … Himself
36. The Muppet Show
  - Episode #4.1 (1979) TV episode … Himself
37. Second Annual Ski Pro Am (March 1979) (TV) ... Himself - host
38. The 21st Annual Grammy Awards (1979) (TV) … Himself – host
39. The Music for UNICEF Concert: A Gift of Song (1979) (TV) … Himself – (performer: "Rhymes & Reasons")
40. First Annual Ski Pro Am (March 1979) (TV) ... Himself - host
41. The 20th Annual Grammy Awards (1978) (TV) … Host
42. Sinatra and Friends (1977) (TV) … Himself
43. The Carpenters' Very First Television Special (1976) (TV) … Himself
44. The John Denver Special (1976) (TV) … Himself
45. Van Dyke and Company
  - Episode dated 7 October 1976 (1976) TV episode
46. The 28th Annual Primetime Emmy Awards (1976) (TV) … Himself – co-host
47. John Denver and Friends (1976) (TV) … Himself
48. The Merv Griffin Show
  - Episode dated 23 February 1976 (1976) TV episode … Himself
  - Episode dated 6 May 1970 (1970) TV episode … Himself
49. John Denver's Rocky Mountain Christmas (1975) (TV) … Himself
50. Doris Day Today - Himself (1975; CBS TV special)
51. McCloud (1974) (TV)
  - Episode "The Colorado Cattle Caper" … TV episode - (performer: "I Guess He'd Rather Be in Colorado")
52. The John Denver Show (1973) TV series … Himself
53. John Denver: Live at Red Rocks (1973) Televised concert … Himself, starring
54. The Midnight Special
  - Episode dated 19 August 1972 (1972) TV episode … Himself
55. Philadelphia Folk Festival (1971) (TV) … Himself
