= Dan Sundquist =

Swedish music producer, songwriter and composer

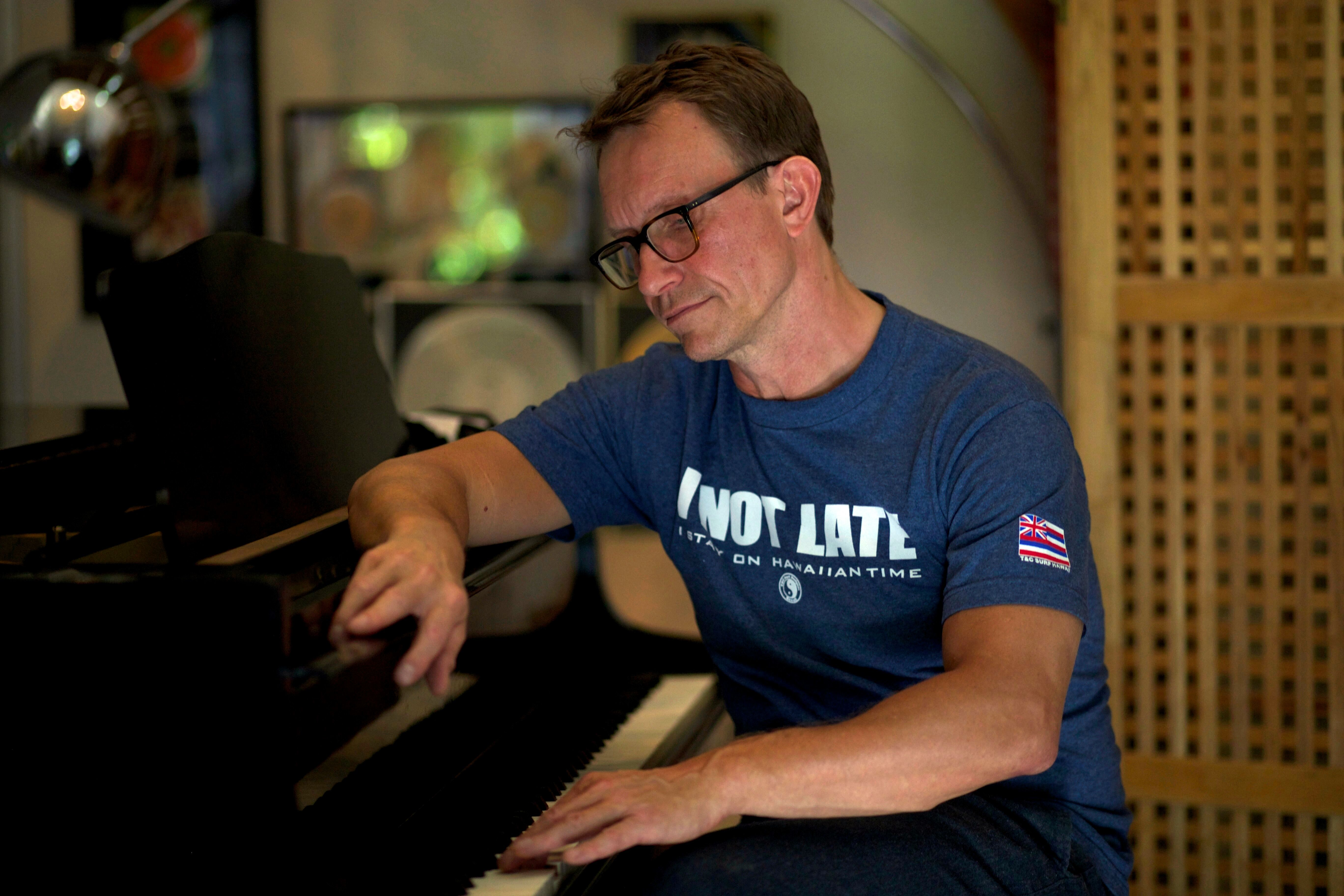
- Sundquist at Big Shadow Studio

Background information
- Born: Thord Dan Rickard Sundquist; 10 September 1958 (age 67); Stockholm, Sweden, June 2015
- Genres: Pop, dance, rock, film score
- Occupations: producer; songwriter; composer
- Years active: 1979–present
- Labels: Mercury Records; Stranded Rekords; EMI; The Record Station; Sony; Warner; Universal; Fuji Pacific; 2101 Records

Thord Dan Rickard Sundqvist (born September 10, 1958) is a Swedish music producer, songwriter and composer.

He is best known for Reeperbahn's Venuspassagen, Jakob Hellman's, "och stora havet", Wilmer X's #1 hit "Vem får nu se alla tårar", Anne-Lie Rydé's Stulna Kyssar, Uno Svenningsson's "Under ytan", Melody Club's debut, and #1 hit "Electric". His work as film composer includes the American film Whitney, and as a producer of musicals includes Livet Är En Schlager and I Love Musicals.

Sundquist has produced over 70 albums with 15 #1 hits in Sweden, numerous top 10's, and 18 Gold and 11 Platinum certifications. He has seven Swedish Grammy Awards, including Producer of The Year, and three nominations.

== Early life and education ==
Dan Sundquist was born to Swedish parents in Stockholm, Sweden and grew up in Näsby Park, Rågsved, Vikarbyn, Hägersten and Vaxholm, Sweden as well as in Barcelona, Spain. Having other musicians in his family led to him developing an early interest in music and the arts. He started playing the guitar at age 7 and the piano at age 11.

After a year in Nyckelviksskolan Art School in 1976, he decided to quit art studies and start his band, called "Reeperbahn" with co-creator Olle Ljungström. They got their first recording contract in 1979. He produced his first ever album in 1980 at 21 years old.

== Career ==
He has produced over 70 albums and his production work has earned him seven Swedish Grammy Awards—including Producer of The Year, for which he was nominated three times. He has 15 #1 hits in Sweden and countless top 10's, certifying at least 18 Gold and 11 Platinum awards.

These include Reeperbahn's Venuspassagen (1981), Jakob Hellman's, "och stora havet" (1989), Wilmer X's #1 hit "Vem får nu se alla tårar" (1991), Anne-Lie Rydé's Stulna Kyssar (1992), Uno Svenningsson's "Under ytan", Melody Club's debut, and #1 hit "Electric" (2003).

His work includes the film score for the American film Whitney—a biopic on the love story of Whitney Houston and Bobby Brown for Lifetime TV, production work on Jonas Gardell's and Fredrik Kempe's musical Livet Är En Schlager, and Peter Jöback's I Love Musicals. He also composed a 31-minute running track, "The Chase", on Spotify's smartphone pioneer Running application, alongside Tiësto. He has also produced and written songs with other Swedish artists such as Måns Zelmerlöw, Sanna Nielsen, Helen Sjöholm, Molly Sandén, Linus Svenning, Anna Bergendahl, Andreas Weise, Fredrik Kempe, Jay Smith, and more.

He has composed the scores for several Swedish feature films, including Vinterviken (1996), Adam & Eva (1997), and Bästa Sommaren (2000).

He is the founder of Big Shadow Music Production Company, a music production and publishing company that is the holding company of his works.

== Swedish Grammy Awards ==
Year	Category	Artist/Album	Result
1996	Producer of the Year	Dan Sundquist	Nominated
1994	Producer of the Year	Dan Sundquist	Nominated
1992	Rock Group of the Year	Wilmer X - Mambo Feber	Won
1990	Rock Artist (Male)	Jakob Hellman ...och stora havet	Won
1989	Producer of the Year	Dan Sundquist	Won
1989	Christian Music	Freda' - Tusen eldar	Won
1989	Newcomer Of The Year	Jakob Hellman	Won
1989	Rock Group of the Year	Wilmer X - Teknikens under	Won
1988	Christian Music	Laila Dahl - Efter regn	Won

== #1 Hits & Classics ==
- 2010 Didrik Solli-Tangen - "My Heart Is Yours". #1 ESC Norway. Gold sales.
- 2010 Anna Bergendahl - "This Is My Life". (Lionheart) #1 ESC Sweden, Gold sales.
- 2002 Melody Club - "Electric” (Virgin/EMI) #1 Hit Tracks & Gold sales.
- 1996 Jumper - När hela världen står utanför (Warner) #1 Hit Tracks & Platinum sales.
- 1996 Jumper - Tapetklister (Warner) #1 Hit Tracks & Platinum sales.
- 1995 Uno Svenningsson - ”Under ytan” (Record Station/BMG).
- 1994 Orup - "”Vid min faders grav”" (Warner) #1 HIT Gold sales and voter’s choice on Tracks radio show.
- 1994 Orup - "”Som Isarna När Det Blir Vår”" (Warner) #1 HIT Gold sales and voter’s choice on Tracks radio show.
- 1991 Wilmer X - "Vem Får Nu Se Alla Tårar" (EMI) #1 Hit, Gold Sales, 10 consecutive weeks on Svensktoppen.
- 1991 Anne-Lie Rydé - En sån karl (EMI) #1 Hit on Svensktoppen.
- 1989 Jakob Hellman - "Vara Vänner" (EMI) #1 Hit on Tracks, Gold sales, 2-time Grammy awards.
- 1989 Desperados - "Louise" (EMI) #1 Hit on Tracks & Sommartoppen radio shows.
- 1988 Fredá - "I en annan del av världen” (Record Station/Cantio) #1 Hit on Tracks, Platinum sales, Grammy Award.
- 1988 Wilmer X - "Teknikens Under" (EMI) #1 on Tracks, Grammy #1 Hit on Tracks, Gold sales, Grammy Award.
- 1986 Fredá - "Vindarna" (Cantio) #1 on Sommartoppen Radio Show - voter's choice.
- 1983 Anne-Lie Rydé - "Segla PÅ Ett Moln" (EMI) #1 Hit on Tracks Radio Show - voter's choice.
- 1981 Reeperbahn - Venuspassagen (Mercury) Cult Status/ Massive great reviews/Over 25.000 sold.

== Film scores ==
- 2014- Whitney - (RedOne Productions/LifeTime) Directed by Angela Bassett
- 2014- Att Skära Mig Fri (SVT) Directed by Setareh Persson
- 2013- My Stolen Revolution (Min Stulna Revolution) Directed by Nahid Persson-Sarvestani
- 2009- En Film Om Olle Ljungström (SVT Documentary) Directed by Jacob Frössén
- 2000- A Summer Tale (Memfis/Sonet) Directed by Ulf Malmros
- 1997- Adam & Eva (SF) Directed by Hannes Holm & Måns Herngren
- 1996- Vinterviken (Filmlance/Sonet) Directed by Harald Hamrell
- 1995- One In A Million (SF) Directed by Hannes Holm & Måns Herngren
- 1992- Hassel- Botgörarna (SVT) Directed by Mikael Håfström
- 1992- Hassel- De Giriga (SVT) Directed by Mikael Håfström

== Discography ==
Albums, Singles, Tracks, TV & Film Scores

Year	Artist	Album	Single	Notes	Producer	Songwriter	Mixer	Company
1979	Reeperbahn	Reeperbahn	Disco Made Me Crazy	Debut Album	check	check		
1980	Bitch Boys	H:son Produktion		Debut Production	check			
1980	Reeperbahn		Inget		check	check		
1980	Prince Valiant		Sommerlath Blues/Stockholm Huzzle	Debut Solo Project	check	check		
1980	Janne Anderson Pop	J A Pop			check			
1981	Reeperbahn	Venuspassagen			check	check		
1981	Date-X	Date-X			check			
1981	Reeperbahn		Till Mitt Liv		check	check		
1981	Ekovox		Soldat Med Brutet Gevär		check			
1981	Reeperbahn		Lycklig/Apparaten		check	check		
1982	Dan Sundquist		Förlorad		check			
1982	Protectors	Teenerama Twist					check	
1982	Japop		Meningslöst Motstånd	1st Production on a Major	check			
1982	Japop	Rysk Pop			check			
1982	Reeperbahn		Dansar		check	check		
1982	Reeperbahn	Samlade Singlar			check	check		
1982	Protectors	Come Back Baby			check			
1982	Pinballs		EP		check			
1983	Peter LeMarc	Cirkus					check	
1983	Peter LeMarc		Kom Klappa Min Kanin		check			
1983	Ekovox		Festival		check			
1983	Heinz & Young	Buzz Buzz Boys					check	
1983	Prins Valiant	Vaddå Jag Dyster?		1st Solo Album	check	check		
1983	Ubangi		Messin' With My Guy		check			
1983	Maria Wickman	Ok, Jag Ger Mig		ESC Sweden	check			
1983	Anne-Lie Rydé	Anne-Lie Rydé			check			
1984	Fredá	En Människa			check			
1984	Anne-Lie Rydé	I Mina Rum			check			
1984	Prins Valiant	Mucho Macho		2nd Solo Album	check	check		
1984	Ubangi		The Little Cat & The Dirty Dog		check			
1984	Tove Naess	Isn't It Crazy			check			
1985	Bel Air		På Äventyr			check		
1986	Fredá	Välkommen Hero			check			
1986	Fredá		Vindarna	#1 Swedish Charts	check			
1986	Stan The Man		Night's The Night		check			
1986	Pugh Rogefeldt		Kommer Det En Vind				check	
1986	Gemini		Wild About That Girl	Co-write with Björn Ulvaeus (ABBA)		check		
1987	Laila Dahl	Efter Regn		Swedish Grammy	check			
1987	Great Guns	Walk me through the storm	Single		check			
1987	Wild Force	Wild Force			check			
1987	Bai Bang	Bai Bang			check			
Fredá		Glädjetåg	Christmas Album Tip Tap	check				
1988	Fredá	Tusen Eldar		Swedish Grammy & Platinum Album	check			
1988	Wilmer X		Polaren Pär	Compilation "Den flygande holländaren"	check			
1988	Martin Rössel		Jag Tror På Dig		check			
1988	Anna Book		Namn & Nummer		check			
1988	Anna Book		Det Finns Mycket Som Man Inte Känner Till		check			
1988	Fredá		I En Annan Del Av Världen	#1 Swedish Charts	check			
1988	Wilmer X	Teknikens Under		Swedish Grammy	check			
1988	Fingerprints		Mitt Ibland Änglar	#3 ESC Sweden Final	check			
1989	Desperados	Desperados			check			
1989	Desperados		Louise	#1 Swedish Charts	check			
1989	Tapirerna	Trick & Tro			check			
1989	Jakob Hellman	...Och Stora Havet		Swedish Grammy & Gold Album	check			
1989	Jakob Hellman		Bara Vara Vänner	#1 Swedish Charts	check			
1990	Suzzies Orkester	No 6			check			
1990	Bebop	Kärleken Tur & Retur			check			
1990	Adolphson & Falk	Indigo			check			
1991	Wilmer X		Vem Får Nu Se Alla Tårar	#1 Swedish Charts	check			
1991	Wilmer X	Mambo Feber		Swedish Grammy & Gold	check			
1991	Laila Dahl		Annie	#4 ESC Sweden Final	check			
1992	Anne-Lie Rydé		En Sån Karl	#1 Swedish Charts	check			
1992	Anne-Lie Rydé	Stulna Kyssar		#1 Swedish Charts & Platinum	check			
1993	Wilmer X	Snakeshow		English Album	check			
1993	Kayo		Om Natten	Massive Airplay	check			
1993	Kayo	Kärleksland			check			
1994	Orup	No 5		Gold	check			
1994	Orup		Vid Min Faders Grav	#1 Swedish Charts	check			
1994	Orup		Som Isarna När Det Blir Vår	Massive Airplay	check			
1994	Svante Thuresson	En Salig Man			check			
1994	Uno Svenningsson		Under Ytan	Swedish Classic & Sync Track	check			
1994	Uno Svenningsson	Uno		Platinum	check			
1994	Keith Collin	The Future Has Begun			check			
1995	Anne-Lie Rydé	Vilda Fåglar”/UNICEF	Till Dig		check			
1995	Olle Ljungström & Titiyo	Vilda Fåglar”/UNICEF	Det Gåtfulla Folket		check			
1995	Joey Tempest	A Place To Call Home		Gold	check			
1995	Olle Ljungström	Tack		Gold	check			
1995	Anne-Lie Rydé	Prima Donna			check			
1996	Orup	Flickor Förr o Nu		Gold	check			
1996	Jumper	Jumper		#1 Swedish Charts & Platinum	check			
1996	Jumper		Tapetklister	#1 Swedish Charts	check			
1996	Jumper		När Hela Världen Står Utanför	#1 Swedish Charts	check			
1997	Jumper		Hon Har Ett Sätt	#3 Swedish Charts	check			
1997	Yasmine	Yes		Japan Release Only	check			
1998	Jumper	Välkommen Hit		Gold	check			
1999	Monica Starck	In From The Cold		Japan Release Only	check			
1999	Martin Svensson		Fiskar Som Viskar		check			
2000	Martin Svensson	Lyxproblem & Moderna Störningar			check	check		
2000	Charlotte Nilsson		Jag Vill Bara Älskas Av Dig		check			
2001	Pop Shop		Life On Mars	Single	check			
2001	Pop Shop	How To Tango			check			
2001	Anne-Lie Rydé		En Riktig Man		check			
2001	Jan Johansen		Cross My Heart		check	check	check	
2002	Dan Bäckman/Felix Herngren	Jan Banan		Swedish Comedy Master	check		check	
2002	Patrik Isaksson		Dom Lyckliga 22		check			
2002	Patrik Isaksson		Hur Kan Du Lova Mig		check			
2002	4U		4U			check		
2002	Melody Club		Electric	#1 Swedish Charts	check			
2003	Melody Club	Music Machine		#1 Swedish Charts & Gold	check		check	
2003	Wilmer X		Lyckliga Hundar		check			
2003	Lucas DelCourt		Le Chaos		check			
2003	Fredrik Kempe		Finally	ESC Sweden	check	check	check	
2003	Fredrik Kempe		With U All The Time		check		check	
2003	Karl Martindahl		Love Turns Water Into Wine	ESC Sweden	check		check	
2003	Anne-Lie Rydé		Säg Att Du Har Ångrat Dig	ESC Sweden	check		check	
2004	Sara Löfgren	Starkare		Gold	check		check	
2004	Johan Becker		Let Me Love You		check		check	
2004	Various Artists	Fånga En Ängel			check		check	
2004	Arja Saijonmaa		Vad Du Än Trodde Så Trodde Du Fel	ESC Sweden	check	check	check	
2004	The Wallstones		Invisible People	ESC Sweden	check		check	
2004	The Wallstones		Love Turns Water Into Wine	ESC Sweden			check	
2005	Åsa Jinder	Då Rädslan Tar Farväl			check		check	
2006	Playzone 2006		Illusion			check		
2006	Tackey & Tsubasa		Go On	Gold		check		
2007	Måns Zelmerlöw		"Miss America"	Gold	check		check	
2007	Nanne G		Skor	Gold	check		check	
2007	Nanne G		Hornen I Pannan		check		check	
2007	Nanne G		Kom Hit		check		check	
2007	Svante Thuresson/Anne-Lie Rydé		Den Första Gången	ESC Sweden	check		check	
2007	Regina Lund		Rainbow Star	ESC Sweden	check		check	
2008	Måns Zelmerlöw		Impossible		check	check		
2008	Måns Zelmerlöw		A Stranger Saved My Life		check		check	
2008	Vox Archangeli	Gregorian Chants EP			check			
2008	Charlotte Perrelli		Black & Blue		check	check	check	
2008	Charlotte Perrelli		Mountain		check	check	check	
2008	Charlotte Perrelli		Holy Man		check	check	check	
2008	Sanna Nielsen		Out of Reach	Gold	check		check	
2008	Måns Zelmerlöw		Ms America Remake		check		check	
2009	Annamaria Espinosa		Innan Alla Ljusen Brunnit Ut	ESC Sweden	check		check	
2009	Black Jack	Summertime Blues			check		check	
2009	Molly Sandén		Säg Att Det Är Regn		check		check	
2009	Molly Sandén		Stanna Kvar		check		check	
2009	Molly Sandén		Kärlek		check		check	
2010	Black Jack	Festival			check		check	
2010	Anne-Lie Rydé	En Dans På Rosor			check		check	
2010	Taylor Dayne		Facing a Miracle			check		
2010	Anna Bergendahl		This is my Life	#1 Swedish Charts, Gold & ESC FINAL	check		check	
2010	Anna Bergendahl	Yours Sincerely		#1 Swedish Charts & Gold	check	check	check	
2010	Didrik Solli-Tangen	My Heart is Yours		#1 Norwegian Charts, Gold & ESC FINAL	check		check	
2010	Gravitonas		Kites				check	
2011	Malena Ernman		I Det Fria		check		check	
2011	Jay Smith		King of Man		check		check	
2011	Jay Smith	King of Man			check	check	check	
2012	Peter Jöback	I Love Musicals			check		check	
2012	Ralf Gyllenhammar		Bed On Fire	#6 ESC Sweden Final	check		check	
2012	BlackJack		Casino		check		check	
2013	Linus Svenning		För Varje Andetag		check		check	Stockhouse /Jordansson
2013	Linus Svenning		Bröder	#3 ESC Sweden Final	check		check	Stockhouse /Jordansson
2014	Linus Svenning		Pappa		check	check	check	Stockhouse /Jordansson
2014	Various Artists	Livet Är En Schlager			check		check	
2014	Linus Svenning		Utan Dig		check	check	check	Stockhouse /Jordansson
2014	Vita Bandet		Josefin		check		check	Stockhouse /Jordansson
2014	Andreas Weise	Christmas Dream EP		PLATINUM Over 9 million on Spotify, no commercials	check	check		Firefly Entertainment AB
2015 to 2017	Dan Sundquist	Score music to Biopic "Whitney"		Showed on Lifetime in the US	check	check		Red One/ Larry Sanitsky Company LLC
2015 to 2017	Dan Sundquist	Score music to documentary "My Stolen Revolution"		Real Reel AB	check	check	check	Real Reel AB
2015 to 2017	Andreas Weise		Date With Santa	Follow-up single to Christmas Dream EP	check	check	check	Firefly Entertainment AB
2015 to 2017	Peter Jöback		Phantom of The Opera Svenska	Swedish version of the 1986 Classic		check	check	Sony Entertainment Sweden AB
2015 to 2017	The Strandels		Chance of Rain	Debut single for TEN act Strandels, same team as behind Zara Larsson	check	check	check	TEN
2015 to 2017	Andreas Weise	Before Christmas EP		GOLD Over 3 million on Spotify, no campaigns	check	check	check	Firefly Entertainment AB
2015 to 2017	Steffo		Hatten Av	Hi Profile News Anchor Debut Single		check	check	Nyhetsbolaget AB
2015 to 2017	Ibrahim	Sprid Ditt Ljus Album		Winner of Talang 2017 Christmas Songs in Swedish		check	check	Sony Entertainment Sweden AB
2015 to 2017	Niklas Strömstedt		Ett Ljus I Mörkret	A Christmas single and a campaign song for the 2017 Christmas Show at Grand Hotel, Stockholm		check	check	Warner Music Sweden AB
2015 to 2017	Niklas Strömstedt		En Gubbe Till			check	check	Warner Music Sweden AB
2015 to 2017	Brolle		I'm Coming Home For Christmas	Debut Christmas song for velvet-voiced Oldies-Goldies singer Brolle		check	check	PJP AB/Darkest Before Dawn AB
2015 to 2017	Jonas Gardell		Det Finns En Väg	Sweden's biggest comedian takes to the mike in Eurovision 2018		check	check	Warner Music Sweden AB
