= Higher Ground (support group) =

American non-profit based in Royal Oak, Michigan

- Higher Ground logo
- Founded: 2002
- Founder: Rick Henning
- Location: Royal Oak, Michigan
- Region served: Southeast Michigan
- Key people: Rick Henning, founder
- Website: www.hghiv.org

Higher Ground is a 501(c)3 non-profit based in Royal Oak, Michigan providing a support group for people living with HIV/AIDS in Metro Detroit and Southeast Michigan. The organization was founded by 2002 by Rick Henning, who received a "Spirit of Detroit Award" from the Detroit City Council in 2007, in part for his work on Higher Ground.

== Support activities ==
The organization offers many support services to persons living with HIV-AIDS.

=== Monday night discussion ===
This is the primary function of the organization. It opens with a guided meditation, afterward everyone is encouraged to participate in discussion and to assist each other in the resolution of personal challenges. Topics of discussion often include new diagnosis, status disclosure, friends/family/workplace, doctor relationships, medication choices, dating/relationships, economic/insurance conflicts and long term challenges.

=== Guest speakers ===
Featured almost monthly they coincide with a member potluck dinner. Previous speaker topics focused on the spiritual and physical aspect of life with HIV/AIDS and covering topics such as:

- Acupuncture
- Buddhist meditation by The Muddy Water Zen Center
- Financial planning by Advisor Reid Beyerlein
- Kabbalah
- Nutrition by Holistic Practitioner Stefan Brink
- Legal issues by The Law Office of Kendra S. Kleber

=== Annual retreat ===
Occurs each spring or fall, depending on schedules. Previous retreats were held at Kettunen Center in 2006, Double JJ Ranch in 2007, Ronora Lodge in 2008, and Retreat Center in 2009. Members participate in activities with others also living with HIV/AIDS and have previously included:

- Art projects
- Campfire discussion
- Dance therapy
- Group meditation
- Horseback Riding
- Ice Cream Social
- Laughter Exercise
- Massage
- Nature walks
- Paddle boating
- Personal Growth Workshops
- Tai chi
- Team Building Exercises
- Yoga

=== Annual blanket drive for AIDS ===
Higher Ground members are encouraged to give back to the community. Blankets are collected during the Holiday season by Higher Ground volunteers. About two dozens agencies have benefited including:

- Children's Hospital of Michigan
- Ruth Ellis Center

=== Movie night ===
Periodic selections are based on applications to living with HIV-AIDS. Previous viewing among others have included:

- Deepak Chopra's Body Mind And Soul
- Girl Positive
- Incredible Mrs. Ritchie
- The Secret (2006 film)
- The 24th Day

=== Hatha yoga ===
Hatha yoga practice is held on Thursday evenings for persons with HIV-AIDS.

=== Reiki ===
Reiki practice is occasionally held in conjunction with the Monday night support meeting.
