= Eva Dahlgren =

Swedish pop musician

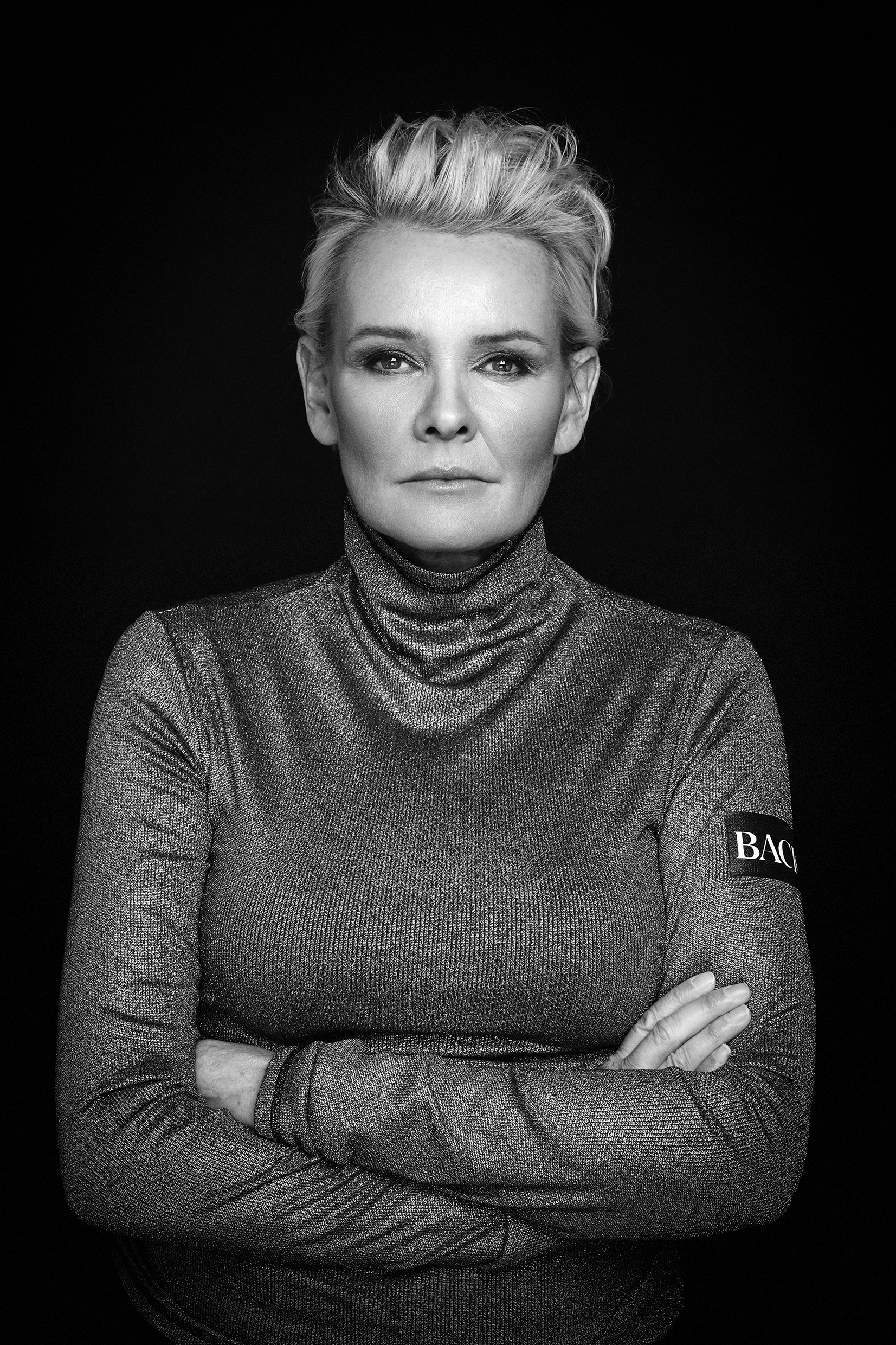
- Eva Dahlgren in March 2016

Background information
- Born: 9 June 1960 (age 66); Umeå, Sweden
- Genre: Pop
- Occupations: Singer; songwriter
- Instruments: Guitar; vocals
- Years active: 1978–present
- Spouse: Efva Attling (m. 2009)

Eva Charlotte Dahlgren (born 9 June 1960) is a Swedish pop musician and singer-songwriter.

== Career ==
Dahlgren was discovered by musician/producer Bruno Glenmark in 1978 after appearing on the TV show Sveriges magasin, and her debut album Finns det nån som bryr sej om was released the same year. In 1979, she placed third in Melodifestivalen (the tryout competition for the Eurovision Song Contest in Sweden). She toured Sweden in 1987 with Swedish pop duo Roxette, a tour that more than 100,000 people attended. Dahlgren's career grew steadily with several album releases during the 1980s, but her definite breakthrough in Sweden came in 1991 with En blekt blondins hjärta, her most successful album, which sold over half a million copies and won her five Grammis awards.

Dahlgren composed the score for the film Ingrid Bergman: In My Own Words (2015).

== Personal life ==
In 1996, Dahlgren made headlines in the Swedish press when she came out as a lesbian through her civil union with jewellery designer Efva Attling, whom she met when she moved to Stockholm in the early 1980s. In connection with the civil union, Dahlgren changed her surname to Dahlgren-Attling. In 2009, they went through a marriage ceremony after Sweden passed its gender-neutral marriage law.

== Discography ==
=== Albums ===
List of studio albums, with selected chart positions
Title	Album details	Peak chart positions			Certifications
Title	Album details	SWE	FIN	NOR	Certifications
Finns det nån som bryr sig om	Released: December 1978; Format: LP, CS; Label: Glen Disc (3010)	23	—	—	
Eva Dahlgren	Released: May 1980; Format: LP, CS; Label: Glen Disc (3015)	25	—	—	
För väntan	Released: June 1981; Format: LP, CS; Label: Epic, CBS (85064)	2	—	—	
Tvillingskäl	Released: October 1982; Format: LP, CS; Label: Glen Disc (3022)	8	5	—	
Ett fönster mot gatan	Released: August 1984; Format: LP, CS; Label: Polar (POLS 392)	2	25	—	
Ung och stolt	Released: January 1987; Format: LP, CS, CD; Label: The Records Station (Stat 1)	2	2	—	Gold
Fria Världen 1.989	Released: February 1989; Format: LP, CS, CD; Label: The Records Station (Stat 14)	3	2	—	Platinum
En blekt blondins hjärta	Released: September 1991; Format: LP, CS, CD; Label: The Records Station (Stat 29)	1	3	—	Platinum
Jag vill se min älskade komma från det vilda	Released: September 1995; Format: LP, CS, CD; Label: The Records Station (Stat 52)	2	4	25	Gold
Lai Lai	Released: March 1999; Format: CD; Label: Anderson Records (AND 12)	1	7	20	Gold
Snö	Released: October 2005; Format: CD; Label: Capitol, EMI (9463418352 9)	2	3	—	Gold
Petroleum och tång	Released: November 2007; Format: CD; Label: Capitol, EMI (509995136352 9)	3	17	—	Gold
Himlen Är Inget Tak (with Peter Jöback)	Released: 2008; Format: LP, CD, digital; Label: Sony Music (88875151602)	—	—	—	
Jag sjunger ljuset	Released: April 2016; Format: LP, CD, digital; Label: Sony Music (88875151602)	3	5	—	
Evalution	Released: August 2020; Format: LP, CD, digital; Label: Years of Charlotte (19439750121)	15	—	—	
Alphabet City Songs (Lost and Found Album)	Released: March 2025; Format: CD, digital; Label: Sony Music	33	—	—	
Revaluation Club	Released: 10 June 2026; Format: CD, digital; Label: Sony Music	57	—	—	

=== Live albums ===
List of live albums, with selected chart positions
Title	Album details	Peak chart positions
Title	Album details	SWE
LaLaLive	Released: 1999; Format: CD + DVD; Label: Anderson (AND 15)	5

=== Charting compilation albums ===
List of charting compilation albums, with selected chart positions
Title	Album details	Peak chart positions		Certifications
Title	Album details	SWE	FIN	Certifications
För minnenas skull 1978-1992	Released: June 1992; Format: 2×CD 2×LP; Label: The Records Station (Stat 34)	10	2	Gold
En blekt blondins ballader 1980-2005	Released: July 2007; Format: CD; Label: Sony BMG (88697123592)	1	19	Platinum
Tid – Urval av Sånger 1980 till nu	Released: September 2012; Format: 2×CD; Label: Capitol, EMI (5099901509120)	9	5	

=== Extended plays ===
List of EPs, with selected chart positions
Title	EP details	Peak chart positions
Title	EP details	SWE
Äventyr	Released: February 2006; Format: CD; Label: Capitol Records (09463545502 1)	58

=== Charting singles ===
List of singles, with selected chart positions
Title	Year	Chart positions	Album
Title	Year	SWE	Album
"Ängeln i rummet"	1989	4	Fria Världen 1.989
"Gunga mig"	1991	40	En Blekt Blondins Hjärta
"Vem tänder stjärnorna"	1991	4	En Blekt Blondins Hjärta
"Kom och håll om mej"	1991	27	En Blekt Blondins Hjärta
"Tro på varann" (with Uno Svenningsson)	1994	22	Uno
"Underbara människa"	1999	41	Lai Lai
"När jag längtar"	2005	17	Snö
"Himlen är inget tak " (with Peter Jöback)	2008	36	Himlen Är Inget Tak
