= Freda' =

Swedish pop group

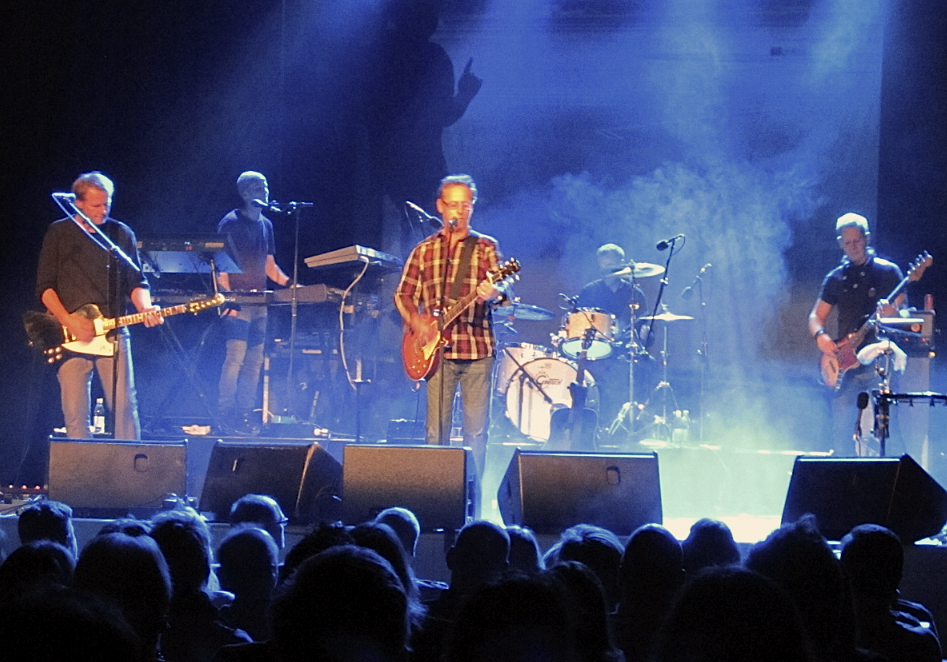
- 2010 Freda' live concert in Borås

Background information
- Origin: Gnosjö, Sweden
- Genres: Pop
- Years active: 1983-1993 (reunited in 2009-2010)
- Members: Uno Svenningsson; Arne Johansson; Mats Johansson
- Past members: Sam Johansson; Jan Nordbring; Per Nordbring

Freda' (Swedish for Friday) is a pop group from Gnosjö in Sweden, formed in 1983, dissolved in 1993 and revived in 2009. (Uno Svenningsson, the group's singer and songwriter, pursued a solo career during its hiatus.) The group chose its name to commemorate the Friday on which it won a rock band competition. Its breakthrough hit was the song "Vindarna", released in 1986; it won Grammis Awards in 1988 and 1990.

== Discography ==
=== Albums ===
Studio albums

Year	Album	Peak positions
Year	Album	SWE
1984	En människa	
1986	Välkommen Hero	37
1988	Tusen eldar	3
1990	Undan för undan	3
1993	Alla behöver	7
2010	Ett mysterium	11
2014	Beväpna dig med tanken	44

Compilations

Year	Album	Peak positions
Year	Album	SWE
1984	Samling 1983-93	25
1993	Allt man kan önska sig	–
2000	Hits	–
2002	Uno & Freda' Samling 2002	6
2006	Det bästa med Freda' & Uno	–
2010	Äntligen här igen - Samlade hits sedan 1984	24

=== Singles ===
Charting at Sverigetopplistan

Year	Single	Peak positions
Year	Single	SWE
1986	"Vindarna"	8
1988	"Det måste gå"	6
1990	"Allt man kan önska sig"	20
1993	"Det som gör mig lycklig"	35

Others singles (Svensktoppen and Sverige Tracks)

- 1988: "I en annan del av världen"
- 1991: "Det saknas lite värme"
- 1993: "Så länge jag lever"

Other singles (non-charting)

- 1984: "Livsviktigt"
- 1984: "En människa"
- 1986: "Doktorn"
- 1986: "Ingen kan förklara"
- 1988: "Jag kan se dig"
- 1991: "Erika"
- 1993: "Alla behöver"
- 2009: "Bäste vän"
- 2010: "Gå aldrig ensam"
- 2010: "Det måste gå - 2010"
