= Perssons Pack =

Swedish folk rock band

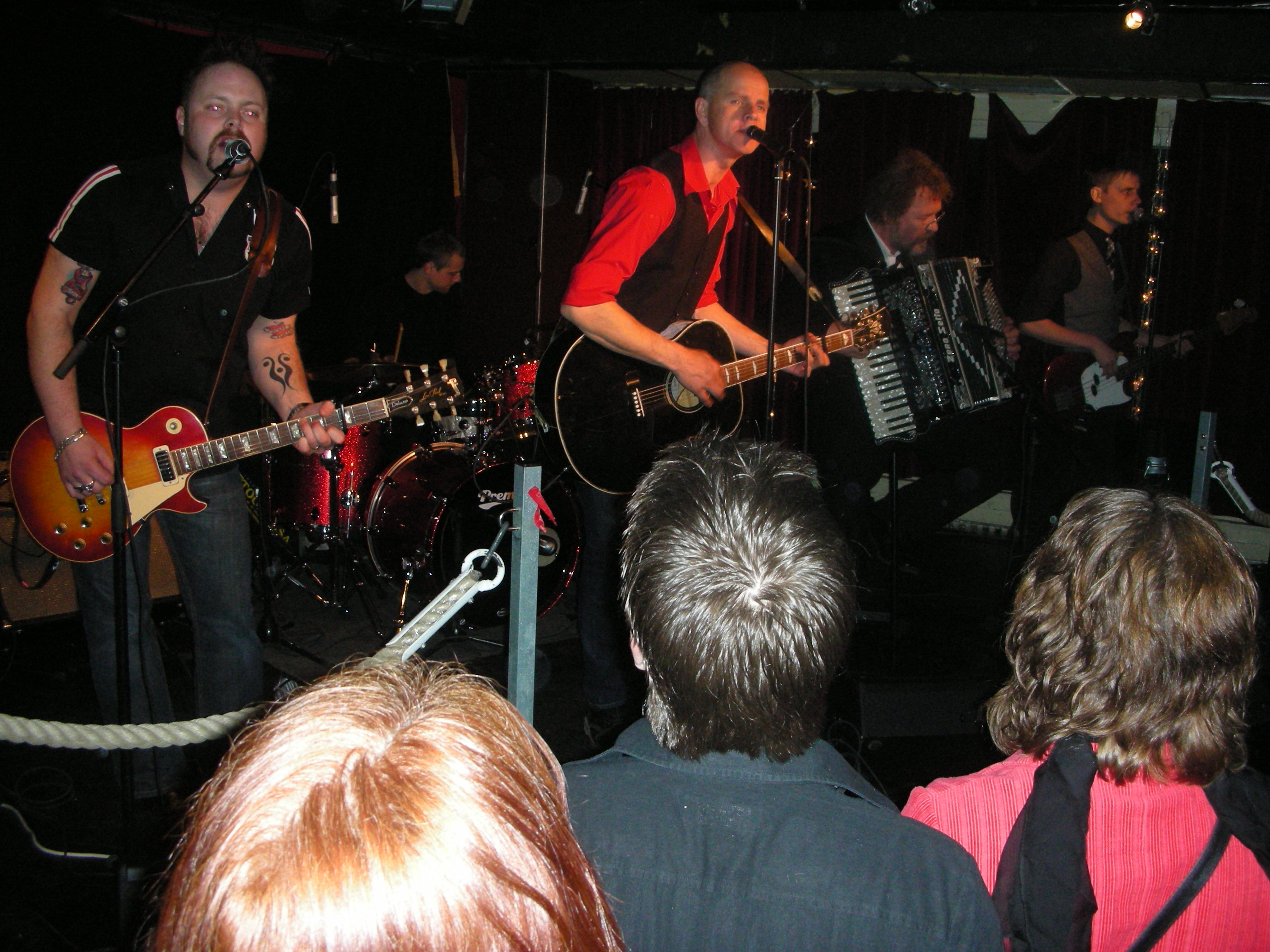

Background information
- Origin: Alfta, Sweden
- Years active: 1989–March 2014
- Label: EMI

Perssons Pack was a Swedish music group that played folk rock. The group started in 1989 and it disbanded in March 2014.
