= Jumper (band) =

Pop group in Kristinehamn, Sweden between 1996–2001

- Origin: Kristinehamn, Sweden
- Genres: pop
- Years active: 1996–2001
- Past members: Niklas Hillbom; Preben Rydin; Martin Andersson; Jonas Moberg; Jan "Linda" Lindström

Jumper was a pop group in Kristinehamn, Sweden, active between 1996 and 2001, scoring single chart successes in Sweden with songs like När hela världen står utanför, Tapetklister, Välkommen hit and Miljonär.

The band won a 1996 Rockbjörnen award in the category "Swedish group of the year".

== Bandmembers ==
- Niklas Hillbom - song and guitar
- Preben Rydin - guitar and chorus
- Martin Andersson - bass and chorus
- Jonas Moberg - drums
- Jan "Linda" Lindström - guitar, piano, organ and chorus
