= Irma Schultz =

Swedish actress and singer

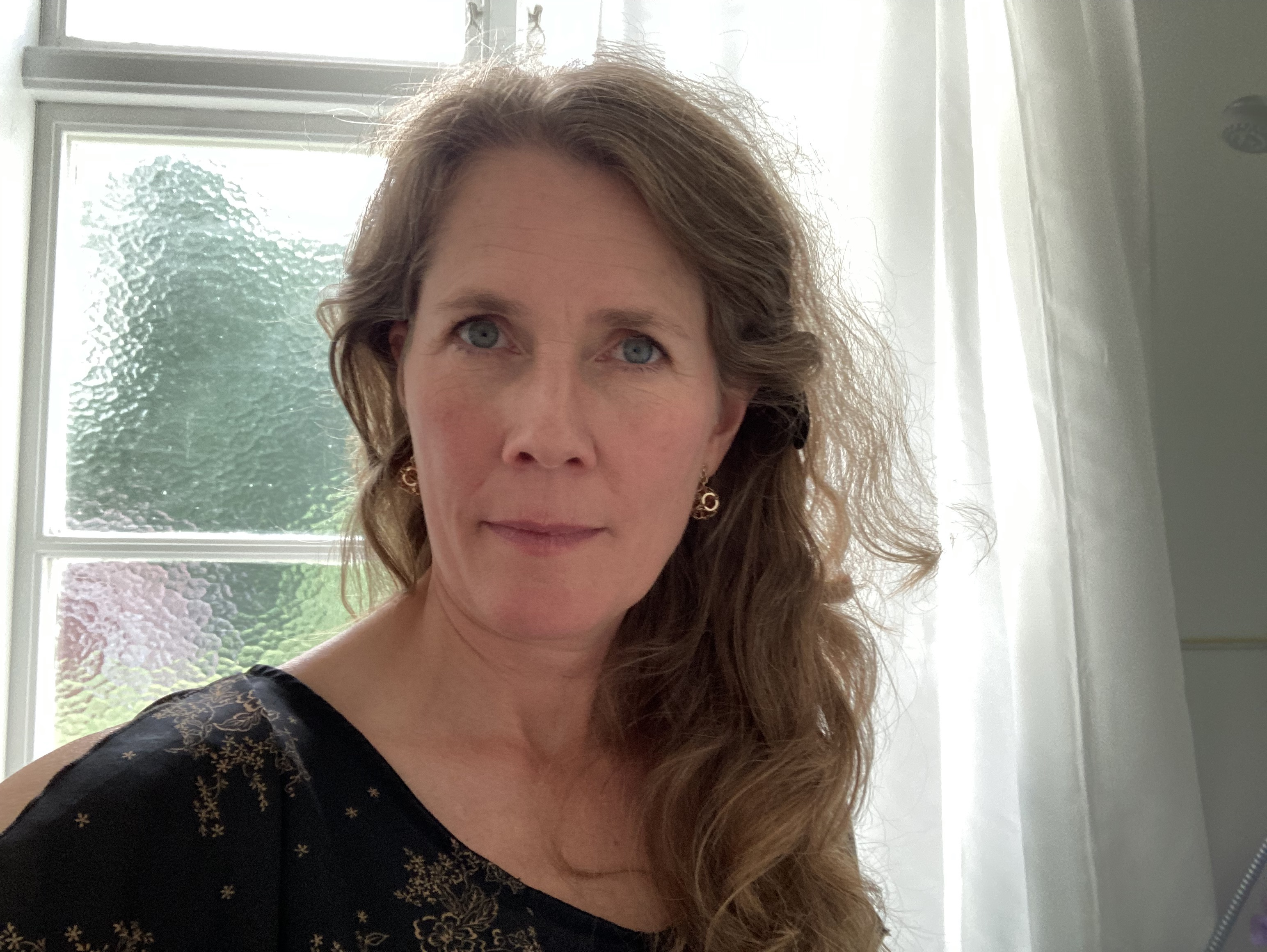
- Schultz in 2021

Background information
- Also known as: Zzzand Tumb, Paris Bis
- Born: Ida Eva-Anna Schultz; 1 October 1965 (age 60); Stockholm, Sweden
- Genres: Swedish pop
- Occupations: Singer, actress
- Years active: 1980–present

Irma Schultz (born 1 October 1965) is a Swedish actress and pop singer who has appeared in many movies and television series in Sweden. She has acted in American productions such as the horror movie The Resurrection of Michael Myers Part 2 and the miniseries "Xerxes". She graduated from the Swedish National Academy of Mime and Acting in 1999. She is the sister of Idde Schultz.

Irma Schultz was married to Nino Keller, drummer in Swedish rock band Ceasars Palace for fifteen years. During that period she also performed under the name Irma Schultz Keller. The couple had two children together but divorced in 2015.

On 3 March 2007 Irma Schultz and Uno Svenningsson performed the song God morgon in Melodifestivalen 2007 and made it as Uno & Irma to the Second Chance Round. But the duo lost to Sonja Aldén in the first voting and were eliminated from the contest.

== Discography ==
=== Albums ===
As Zzzang Tumb

- 1982: 37 Minuter i Stockholms City (Stranded Rekords)
- 1983: Zzzang Tumb (Stranded Rekords)

As Paris Bis

- 1986: Body & Soul Mekano, single/maxisingle

Studio albums

- 1989: Då staden har vaknat
- 1991: Irma
- 1993: Tröst för stygga barn
- 1995: Andas fritt
- 2003: Imma på glas
- 2006: Sånger för December (Uno Svenningsson feat. Irma Schultz Keller)
- 2007: Psalmer
- 2010: Blank is – sånger av Joni Mitchell
- 2011: December – En svensk jul (Uno Svenningsson & Irma Schultz Keller)

=== Singles ===
- 1988: "Tillbaks till mig"
- 1989: "Vem är du?"
- 1989: "För varje steg"
- 1990: "Decembersnö"
- 1991: "Stureplan"
- 1991: ""Precis som du"
- 1991: "Någonstans inom mig"
- 1991: "I mitt hus"
- 1992: "Decembersnö" (new version)
- 1993: "Kom ner (Lämna vingarna kvar)"
- 1993: "Min räddning"
- 1995: "Andas fritt"
- 1995: "Vad hände med oss två"
- 1996: "Bomull och blad"
- 2003: "Stereo"
- 2007: "God morgon" (duo with Uno Svenningsson)
- 2010: "Jag kan dricka friskt av dig"
