= Staffan Hellstrand =

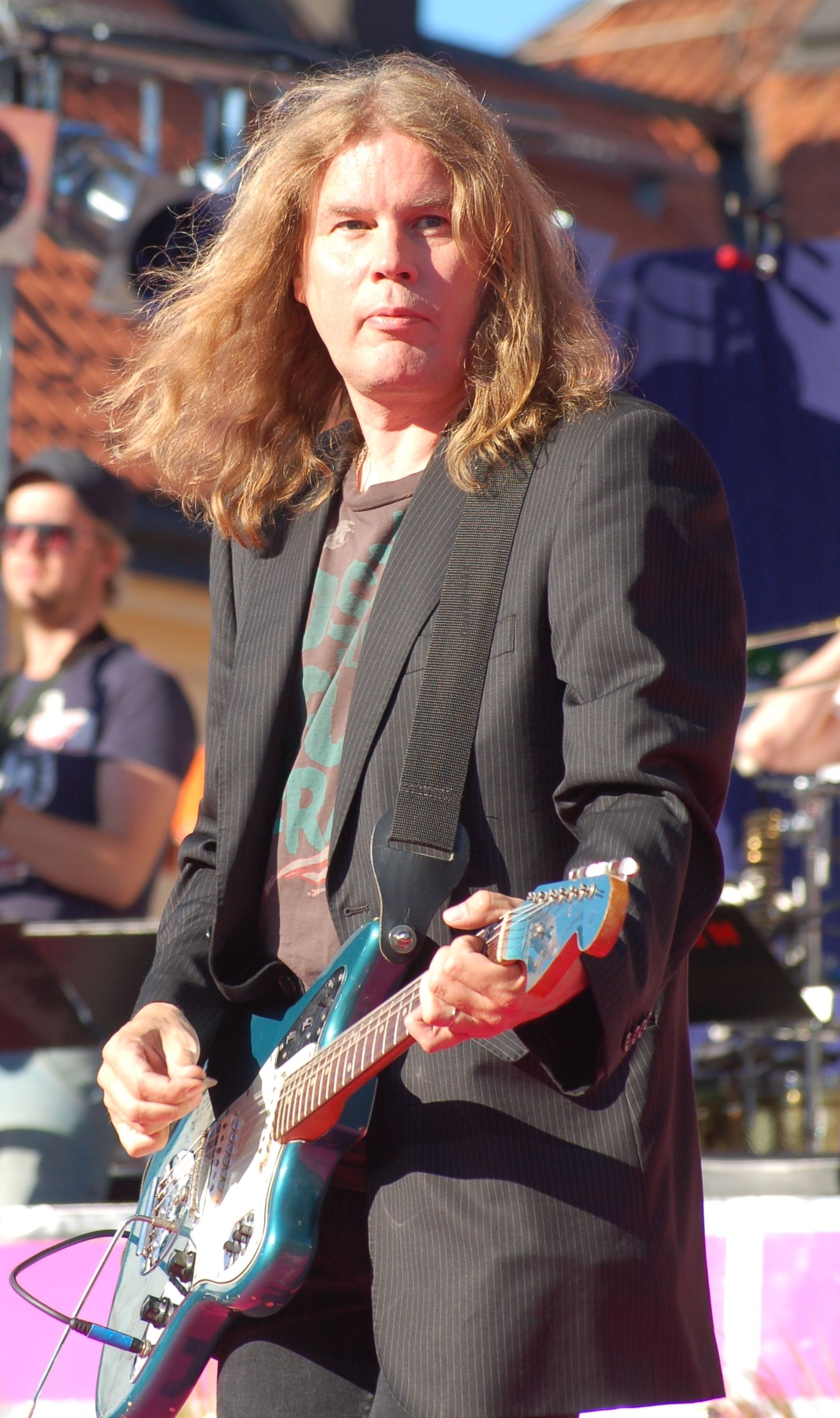
- Staffan Hellstrand appearing during Sommarkrysset at Gröna Lund in 2008

Background information
- Born: Mats Eric Staffan Hellstrand; 13 May 1956 (age 70); Stockholm, Sweden
- Genres: Swedish pop, rock
- Occupations: Singer; musician
- Instruments: guitar, harmonica, keyboard
- Years active: 1990 — Present

Mats Eric Staffan Hellstrand (born 13 May 1956) is a Swedish singer, rock musician (guitar, harmonica, keyboard), songwriter and record producer.

== Biography ==
Hellstrand was born in Stockholm, Sweden. He has scored record successes at the Swedish charts during the 1990s.

Hellstrand also works as a prolific record producer. Among his best-known works, he produced Idde Schultz' 1995 self-titled debut album, for which he also composed the song "Högre mark", which was released as a single the same year and became a hit. Schultz' English-lyrics version of the song, "Higher Ground", was released as a single in 1996 and it was well received internationally, becoming a classic of 1990s pop music.

Hellstrand also wrote "Explodera", the official fight song for the Sweden men's national football team during the UEFA Euro 2000. It peaked at number eight on the Swedish Singles Chart.

== Discography ==
=== Studio albums ===
- Hemlös (1989)
- Den stora blå vägen (1991)
- Eld (1992)
- Regn (1993)
- Sot (1994)
- Pascha Jims dagbok (1996)
- Underland (1998)
- Underbarn (1999)
- Starsång (2001)
- Socker & synder (2002)
- Elektriska gatan (2004)
- Motljus (2006)
- Spökskepp (2007)
- Staffan Hellstrand (2012)
- Blod & tårar (2015)

=== Compilation albums ===
- Staffan Hellstrand & SH! samling 85–92 (1993)
- Staffan Hellstrands bästa (2000)
- Diamanter (2004)
- Lilla fågel blå (2009)
