= Idde Schultz =

Swedish female singer and guitarist

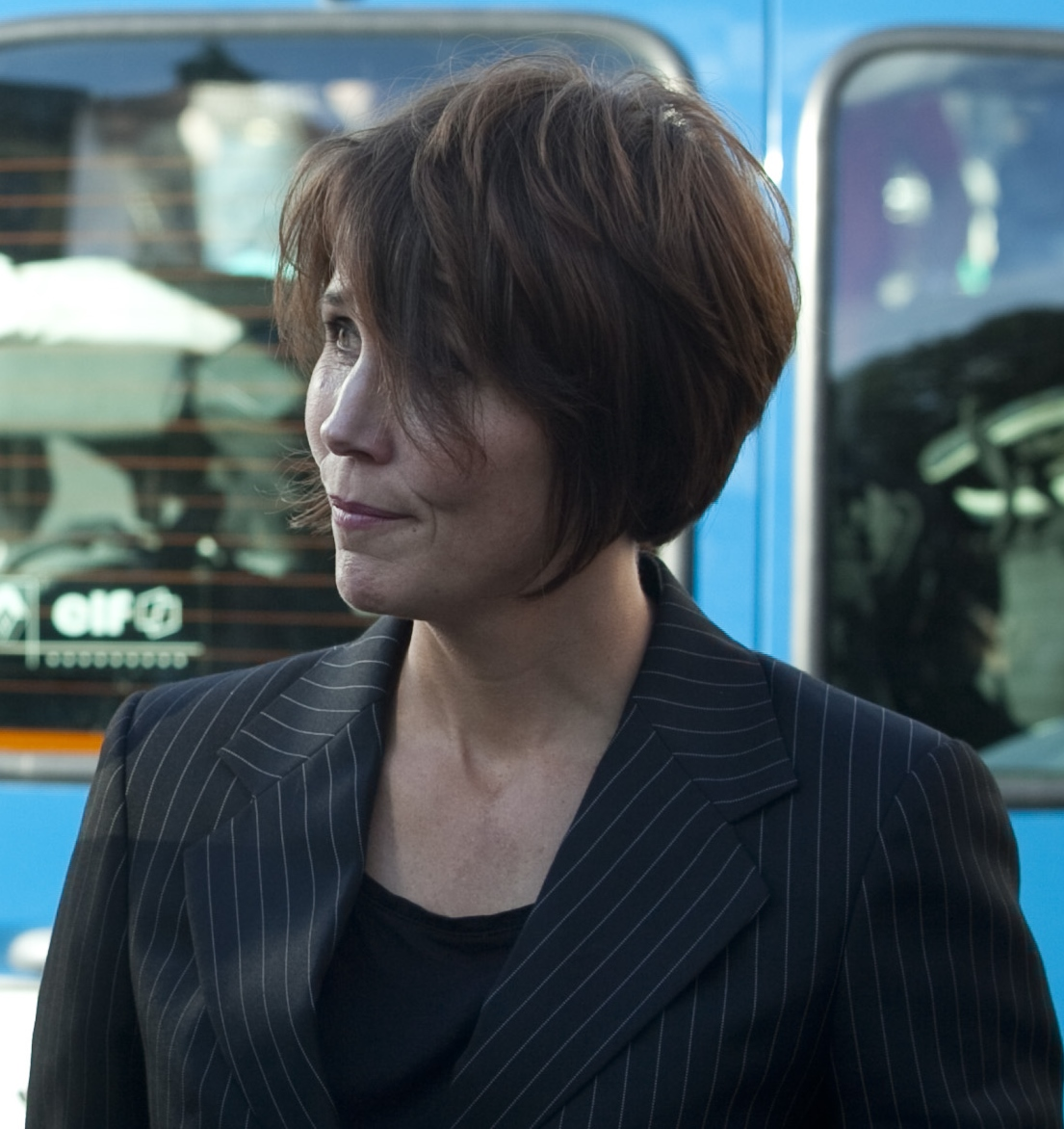
- Idde Schultz, 2010

Background information
- Born: Eva Ann-Ida Schultz; 1 September 1963 (age 62); Stockholm, Sweden
- Genres: Swedish pop
- Occupation: singer
- Instrument: guitar
- Years active: 1980–present

Eva Ann-Ida "Idde" Schultz (born 1 September 1963) is a Swedish female singer and guitarist. She is a member of the band Docenterna and former member of Lars Winnerbäck's band Hovet. She is the sister of Irma Schultz Keller. She has scored record successes at the Swedish charts during the mid-late 1990s and the 2000s.

Schultz is a music teacher at Fryshusets gymnasium.

== Discography ==
=== Zzzang Tumb ===
- 1982 - 37 Minuter i Stockholms City, Stranded Rekords
- 1983 - Zzzang Tumb, Stranded Rekords

=== Torpederna ===
- 1993 - Innan himlen faller

=== Solo ===
- 1995 – Idde Schultz
- 1997 – Vad man gör (och inte gör)

=== Lars Winnerbäck and Hovet ===
- 1998 – Med solen i ögonen
- 2001 – Singel
- 2001 – Live för dig
- 2003 – Söndermarken
- 2004 – Live i Linköping (concert DVD)
- 2005 – Stort liv (EP)
- 2006 – Efter nattens bränder (compilation album)

=== Hovet ===
- 2004 – Hovet 2004

=== Anna + Idde ===
- 2005 – Anna + Idde (EP)
- 2006 – Vägar hem
- 2008 – Hjärtat fullt

=== Sulo & Idde ===
- 2011 – Kocksgatan Revisited together with Sulo Karlsson
