= Uno Svenningsson =

Swedish pop singer and guitarist

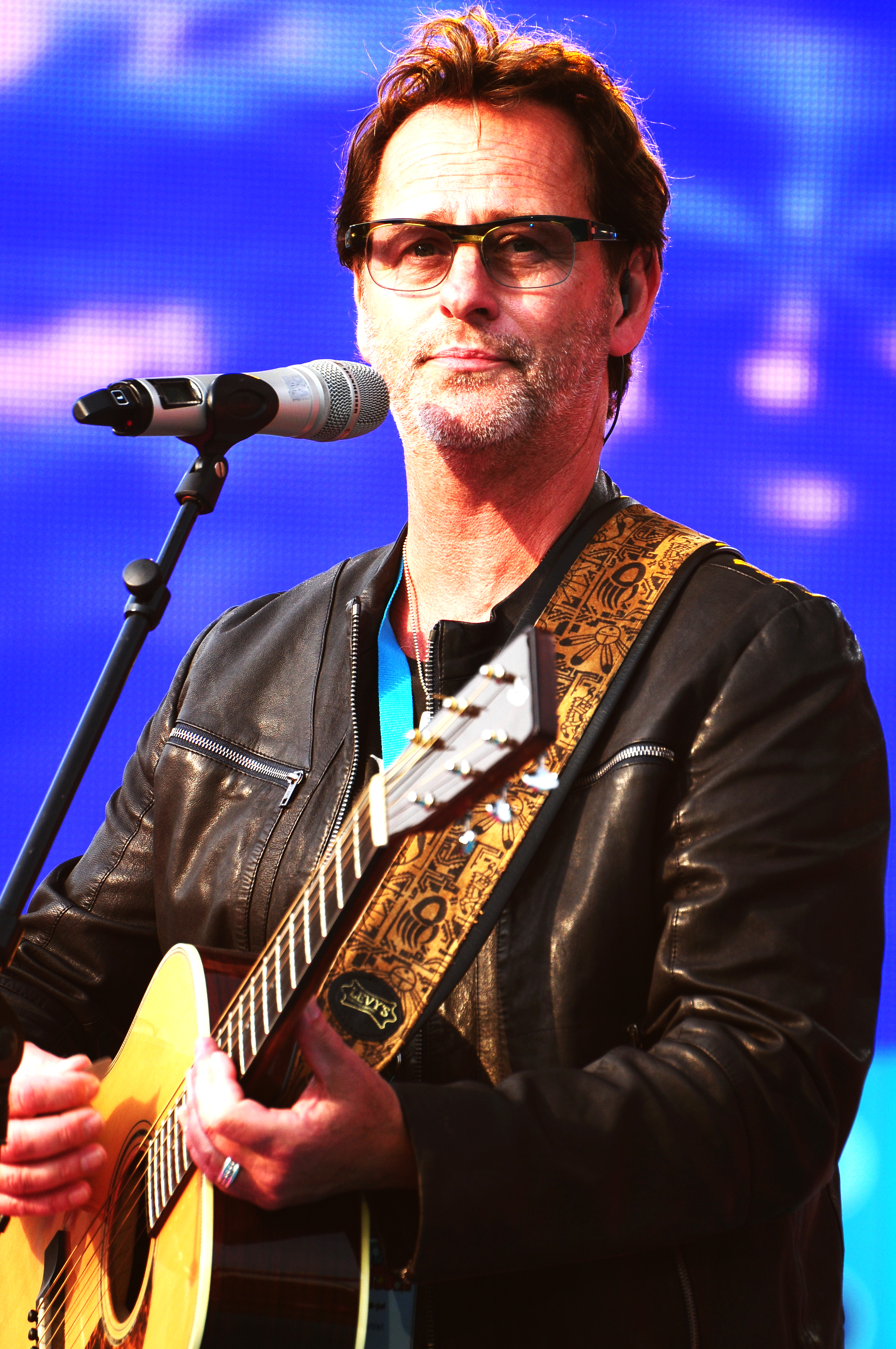
- Uno Svenningsson at Sommarkrysset in 2012

Background information
- Born: 1 July 1959 (age 67); Hagelstorp, Gnosjö Municipality, Sweden
- Genres: Pop
- Occupations: Singer; songwriter
- Instrument: Guitar
- Years active: 1983–
- Formerly of: Freda'

Uno Svenningsson (born 1 July 1959 in Hagelstorp, Gnosjö Municipality, Sweden) is a Swedish pop singer-songwriter and guitarist, who has been active in music since the late 1970s. He was the singer in the pop group "Freda'" in the early 1980s and early 1990s, and the group had hit songs like "Vindarna" and "Det gör mig så lycklig".

Since 1994, Svenningsson has been a solo artist. His first four solo albums sold approximately 300,000 copies.

In 2002, Carlsberg launched a series of TV commercials for Pripps Blå, with Uno Svenningsson's song "Vågorna" as background music.

In 2007, Uno Svenningsson joined Irma Schultz Keller to participate in the Swedish Melodifestivalen 2007, and compete for the chance to represent Sweden in the Eurovision Song Contest 2007. They participated in the semi-finals in Jönköping with the song "God morgon". They qualified for the second chance round of Melodifestivalen. On 3 March 2007, they lost in the first voting of "second chance" against Sonja Alden and were eliminated from the contest.

In 2016, he joined fellow singers Patrik Isaksson and Tommy Nilsson to sing at Melodifestivalen 2016 with the song "Håll mitt hjärta hårt", but the trio identified as Patrik, Tommy & Uno failed to make it to "second chance" or the finals and was eliminated from the contest.

In 2017, he participated in season 8 of Så mycket bättre.

== Discography ==
=== Albums ===
List of studio albums, with selected chart positions
Title	Album details	Peak chart positions
Title	Album details	SWE
Uno	Released: September 1994; Format: CD; Label: The Record Station (Stat 48)	2
…due!	Released: October 1996; Format: CD; Label: The Record Station (Stat 56)	1
Möss & människor	Released: September 1998; Format: CD; Label: Metronome (3984-24158-2)	4
I det osynliga	Released: August 2001; Format: CD; Label: Metronome (8573-89673-2)	1
Ett andetag från dig	Released: December 2004; Format: CD; Label: Bolero Records (5050467-6077-2-9)	4
Sånger för december (with Irma Schultz Keller)	Released: November 2006; Format: CD; Label: Bolero Records (5051011-7075-2-0)	16
Jag sjunger för dig	Released: September 2008; Format: CD; Label: Bolero Records (5051442-0134-2-9)	19
December - En svensk jul (with Irma Schultz Keller)	Released: November 2011; Format: CD; Label: Sonet (060252787270)	53
7	Released: November 2013; Format: CD; Label: Playground Music Scandinavia (PGMLCD130)	32
Andras sånger	Released: February 2018; Format: CD; Label: Playground Music Scandinavia (PGMLCD138)	7
Österlen	Released: November 2020; Format: CD, LP; Label: Playground Music Scandinavia (PGMLCD147)	24

=== Charting compilation albums ===
List of charting compilation albums, with selected chart positions
Title	Album details	Peak chart positions
Title	Album details	SWE
Samling 2002 (with Freda')	Released: May 2002; Format: CD; Label: Metronome (0927-47041-2)	6

=== Extended plays ===
List of EPs, with selected chart positions
Title	EP details	Peak chart positions
Title	EP details	SWE
Så mycket bättre säsong 8 - Tolkningarna	Released: December 2017; Format: Digital	12

=== Singles ===
Title	Year	Peak chart positions	Album
Title	Year	SWE	Album
"Tid att gå vidare"	1994	—	Uno
"Tro på varann" (with Eva Dahlgren)	1994	22	Uno
"Under ytan"	1994	—	Uno
"Skymtar för en stund"	1995	—	Due
"Terese"	1996	—	Due
Istället går jag här	1996	—	
"Be mig inte gå på vatten"	1996	—	
"En sökares hjärta"	1997	—	Due
"Simona"	1998	—	Möss och Människor
"Vill du leva med mig"	1998	—	Möss och Människor
"Fågel fisk eller mittemellan"	1998	—	Möss och Människor
"Ge inte upp" (with Freddie Wadling)	1999	—	
"Festen"	1999	—	
"Vågorna"	2001	80	I det osynliga
"Inte en gång till"	2001	—	I det osynliga
"Det jag behöver"	2001	—	I det osynliga
"Andas genom mig"	2004	—	Ett andetag från dig
"God morgon" (with Irma Schultz Keller)	2007	18	Jag sjunger för dig
"Längtar efter värme"	2007	—	Jag sjunger för dig
"Liten bambi"	2008	—	Jag sjunger för dig
"Du är en del av mig" (with Sonja Aldén)	2008	—	Jag sjunger för dig
"Jorden har sin egen sång"	2010	—	
"Storebror" (with Frispråkarn)	2012	—	
"(När ska vi ta) Semester"	2013	—	
"Jag är jag"	2013	—	7
"Smultron på ett strå"	2014	—	7
"Håll mitt hjärta hårt" (with Patrik Isaksson and Tommy Nilsson)	2016	—	
"När natten lindar sig runt mig"	2020	—	
"Bara få höra din röst" (with Per Gessle)	2022	— (Note: "Bara få höra din röst" did not enter the Swedish Singellista Chart, but peaked at number 19 on the Swedish Heatseeker Chart.)	
