= Rockbjörnen =

Swedish music prize

- Date: 1979–
- Country: Sweden
- Presented by: Aftonbladet
- Website: http://www.aftonbladet.se/nojesbladet/musik/rockbjornen/

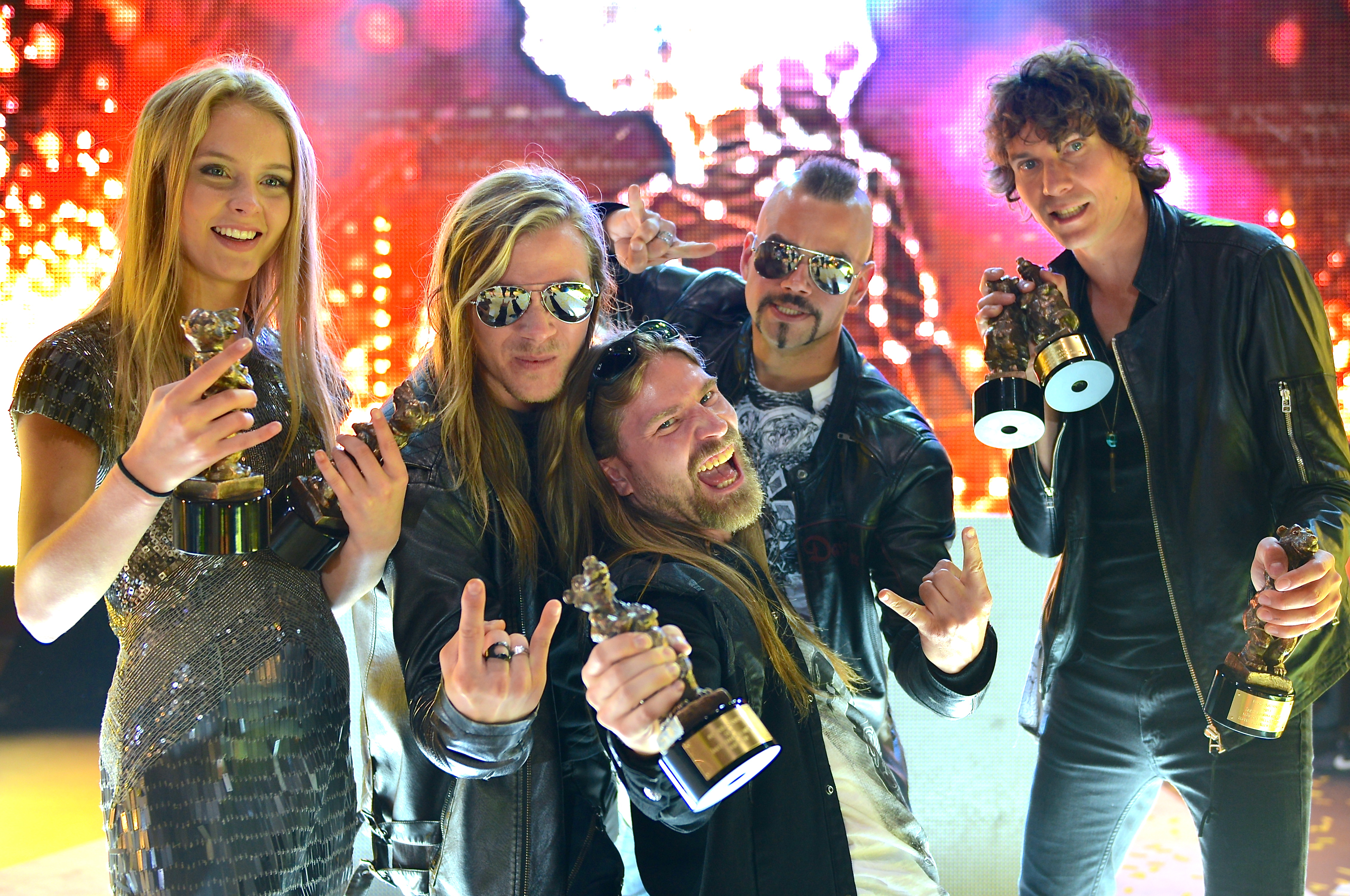
Zara Larsson, Sabaton, Håkan Hellström at Gröna Lund in Stockholm after being awarded the prize in August 2013

Rockbjörnen (Swedish: the Rock Bear) is a music prize in Sweden, divided into several categories, which is awarded annually by the newspaper Aftonbladet. The prize was first awarded in 1979, and is mostly centered on pop and rock.

In 2010, Rockbjörnen was redone and focused more on live performances. This initiative was hailed by artists and industry. The period for selecting the winners of Rockbjörnen was extended from one month to three months (all summer).

== Categories ==
=== Rockbjörnen's Myspace prize ===
Year	Laureate
2007	Kid Down
2008	Billie the Vision and the Dancers

=== The year's best dance band ===
Year	Laureate
1979	Wizex

=== The year's best Swedish band ===
Year	Laureate
1979	No awards
1980	Noice
1981	Freestyle
1982	Gyllene Tider
1983	Raj Montana Band
1984	Ratata
1985	Imperiet
1986	Europe
1987	Ratata
1988	Roxette
1989	Roxette
1990	the Creeps
1991	Roxette
1992	Roxette
1993	Atomic Swing
1994	Nordman
1995	Just D
1996	Jumper
1997	Kent
1998	The Cardigans
1999	Kent
2000	The Ark
2001	Lambretta
2002	Kent
2003	Kent
2004	Gyllene Tider
2005	Bodies Without Organs
2006	BWO
2007	Sahara Hotnights
2008	Takida

=== The year's best live group ===
Year	Laureate
2010	Kent
2011	The Ark

=== The year's Swedish female artist ===
Year	Laureate
1979	No awards
1980	Liza Öhman
1981	Eva Dahlgren
1982	Anni-Frid Lyngstad
1983	Agnetha Fältskog
1984	Eva Dahlgren
1985	Anne-Lie Rydé
1986	Marie Fredriksson
1987	Marie Fredriksson
1988	Marie Fredriksson
1989	Marie Fredriksson
1990	Titiyo
1991	Eva Dahlgren
1992	Lisa Nilsson
1993	Louise Hoffsten
1994	Lisa Ekdahl
1995	Robyn
1996	Dilba
1997	Cajsalisa Ejemyr
1998	Emilia Rydberg
1999	Robyn
2000	Feven
2001	Lisa Miskovsky
2002	Robyn
2003	Lisa Miskovsky
2004	Lena Philipsson
2005	Laleh
2006	Lisa Miskovsky
2007	Sonja Aldén
2008	Amanda Jenssen
2010	Robyn
2011	Veronica Maggio

=== The year's female live act ===
Year	Laureate
2010	Robyn
2011	Veronica Maggio

=== The year's Swedish live act ===
Year	Laureate
2007	The Ark
2008	Håkan Hellström

=== The year's Swedish newcomer ===
Year	Laureate
2002	The Sounds
2003	Pauline
2004	Ana Johnsson
2005	Laleh
2006	Sebastian Karlsson
2007	Måns Zelmerlöw
2008	Amanda Jenssen

=== The year's breakthrough ===
Year	Laureate
2010	Oskar Linnros
2011	Daniel Adams-Ray

=== Swedish song of the year ===
Year	Laureate
1992	Himlen runt hörnet by Lisa Nilsson
1993	Lilla fågel blå by Staffan Hellstrand
1994	Vandraren by Nordman
1995	Fiskarna i haven by Idde Schultz
1996	Gå & fiska! by Gyllene Tider
1997	Save Tonight by Eagle-Eye Cherry
1998	Big Big World by Emilia Rydberg
1999	Musik non stop by Kent
2000	Hiphopper by Thomas Rusiak feat. Teddybears Sthlm
2001	Come Along by Titiyo
2002	Kom Igen Lena! by Håkan Hellström
2003	Här kommer alla känslorna (på en och samma gång) by Per Gessle
2004	Walk Idiot Walk av The Hives
2005	Alla vill till himmelen men ingen vill dö by Timbuktu
2006	7milakliv by Martin Stenmarck
2007	Om du lämnade mig nu by Lars Winnerbäck & Miss Li
2008	Feel Good by Ola
2010	Från och med du by Oskar Linnros
2011	Jag kommer by Veronica Maggio

=== The year's Swedish male artist ===
Year	Laureate
1979	Ulf Lundell
1980	Ulf Lundell
1981	Mikael Rickfors
1982	Ulf Lundell
1983	Magnus Uggla
1984	Dan Hylander
1985	Joakim Thåström
1986	Magnus Uggla
1987	Orup
1988	Tommy Nilsson
1989	Orup
1990	Niklas Strömstedt
1991	Tomas Ledin
1992	Mauro Scocco
1993	Magnus Uggla
1994	Uno Svenningsson
1995	Olle Ljungström
1996	E-Type
1997	Eagle Eye Cherry
1998	E-Type
1999	Orup
2000	Håkan Hellström
2001	Håkan Hellström
2002	Håkan Hellström
2003	Per Gessle
2004	Lars Winnerbäck
2005	Darin
2006	Lars Winnerbäck
2007	Lars Winnerbäck
2008	Lars Winnerbäck

=== The year's male live act ===
Year	Laureate
2010	Lars Winnerbäck
2011	Håkan Hellström

=== The year's Swedish album ===
Year	Laureate
1979	Ripp Rapp by Ulf Lundell
1980	Palsternacka by Dag Vag
1981	Kärlek & Uppror by Ebba Grön
1982	Kär och galen by Ulf Lundell
1983	Välkommen till folkhemmet by Magnus Uggla
1984	Chess by Björn Ulvaeus, Benny Andersson and Tim Rice
1985	Blå himlen blues by Imperiet
1986	Den döende dandyn by Magnus Uggla
1987	Efter stormen av Marie Fredriksson
1988	Look Sharp! by Roxette
1989	35-åringen by Magnus Uggla
1990	Tillfälligheternas spel by Tomas Ledin
1991	Joyride by Roxette
1992	Himlen runt hörnet by Lisa Nilsson
1993	Alla får påsar by Magnus Uggla
1994	Nordman by Nordman
1995	Ingenmansland by Nordman
1996	Verkligen by Kent
1997	Isola by Kent
1998	Gran Turismo by The Cardigans
1999	Det är ni som e dom konstiga, det är jag som e normal by Thåström
2000	Känn ingen sorg för mig Göteborg by Håkan Hellström
2001	Tillbaks på ruta 1 by Patrik Isaksson
2002	Vapen & ammunition by Kent
2003	Mazarin by Per Gessle
2004	Finn 5 fel! by Gyllene Tider
2005	Du & jag döden by Kent
2006	Changes by Lisa Miskovsky
2007	Tillbaka till samtiden by Kent
2008	För sent för Edelweiss by Håkan Hellström

=== The year's foreign artist ===
Year	Laureate
1979	No awards
1980	Bruce Springsteen
1981	Kim Wilde
1982	David Bowie
1983	David Bowie
1984	Prince
1985	Bruce Springsteen
1986	Bruce Springsteen
1987	Michael Jackson
1988	Bruce Springsteen
1989	Madonna
1990	Sinéad O'Connor
1991	Bryan Adams
1992	Madonna
1993	Meat Loaf
1994	R.E.M.
1995	Björk
1996	Alanis Morissette
1997	Puff Daddy
1998	Madonna
1999	Britney Spears
2000	Eminem
2001	Robbie Williams
2002	Eminem
2003	Robbie Williams
2004	Anastacia
2005	James Blunt
2006	Justin Timberlake
2007	Timbaland
2008	Duffy

=== The year's foreign group ===
Year	Laureate
1979	No awards
1980	Police
1981	Police
1982	Rolling Stones
1983	Police
1984	Alphaville
1985	Dire Straits
1986	Eurythmics
1987	U2
1988	U2
1989	Milli Vanilli (disqualified; it was revealed that they were miming to a record)
1990	Depeche Mode
1991	Guns N' Roses
1992	Guns N' Roses
1993	Aerosmith
1994	R.E.M.
1995	Oasis
1996	The Fugees
1997	The Verve
1998	Five
1999	Red Hot Chili Peppers
2000	Red Hot Chili Peppers
2001	Linkin Park
2002	Red Hot Chili Peppers
2003	Evanescence
2004	Maroon 5
2005	Green Day
2006	Red Hot Chili Peppers
2007	Tokio Hotel
2008	Coldplay

=== The year's foreign song ===
Year	Laureate
1992	Sweat (A La La La Long) by Inner Circle
1993	Runaway Train by Soul Asylum
1994	Love Is All Around by Wet Wet Wet delade med Always by Bon Jovi
1995	Gangsta's Paradise by Coolio
1996	Killing Me Softly by The Fugees
1997	I'll Be Missing You by Puff Daddy
1998	Believe by Cher
1999	The Bad Touch by Bloodhound Gang
2000	Hey Ya! by Outkast
2001	Can't Get You Out of My Head by Kylie Minogue
2002	By the Way by Red Hot Chili Peppers
2003	Hey Ya! by Outkast
2004	This Love by Maroon 5
2005	You're Beautiful by James Blunt
2006	Crazy by Gnarls Barkley
2007	Apologize by OneRepublic
2008	Viva la Vida by Coldplay
2010	World Behind My Wall by Tokio Hotel
2011	Born This Way by Lady Gaga
2015	Shake It Off by Taylor Swift

=== The year's foreign album ===
Year	Laureate
1979	Communiqué by Dire Straits
1980	The Wall by Pink Floyd
1981	Tattoo You by The Rolling Stones
1982	Avalon by Roxy Music
1983	Colour by Numbers by Culture Club
1984	Forever Young by Alphaville
1985	Brothers in Arms by Dire Straits
1986	Revenge by Eurythmics
1987	The Joshua Tree by U2
1988	Rattle and Hum by U2
1989	Like a Prayer by Madonna
1990	Blaze of Glory by Jon Bon Jovi
1991	Waking up the Neighbours by Bryan Adams
1992	Dangerous by Michael Jackson
1993	Get a Grip by Aerosmith
1994	Monster by R.E.M.
1995	(What's the Story) Morning Glory by Oasis
1996	Jagged Little Pill by Alanis Morissette
1997	Urban Hymns by The Verve
1998	Ray of Light by Madonna
1999	Californication by Red Hot Chili Peppers
2000	The Marshall Mathers LP by Eminem
2001	Hybrid Theory by Linkin Park
2002	The Eminem Show by Eminem
2003	Life For Rent by Dido
2004	Anastacia by Anastacia
2005	Confessions on a Dance Floor by Madonna
2006	I'm Not Dead by Pink
2007	Timbaland Presents Shock Value by Timbaland
2008	Viva la Vida or Death and All His Friends by Coldplay

=== The year's concert ===
Year	Laureate
2010	Welcome to Humanoid City with Tokio Hotel
2011	Mando Diao at Peace & Love

=== The year's festival ===
Year	Laureate
2010	Peace & Love
2011	Peace & Love

=== The year's live act metal ===
Year	Laureate
2011	Metallica

=== The year's live act hard rock/metal ===
Year	Laureate
2011	Iron Maiden

=== The Century's foreign group/artist ===
Year	Laureate
1999	The Beatles

=== The century's Swedish group/artist ===
Year	Laureate
1999	ABBA

== Qualifications ==
=== The year's female live artist, The year's male live artist & The year's livegroup ===
The artist will play at least three occasions in Sweden, at least three songs and the performance should be open to regular audience (fans) in front of the stage (not only on TV). The concerts must take place in Sweden.

=== The year's breakthrough ===
Formerly known as the prize The year's Newcomer. The artist must have played in Sweden for public at least three occasions. Must not be their own concerts. Can be, for example, Rix FM Festival.

=== The year's concert ===
To qualify, the performance must be its own event, not part of a festival. It is enough to only have 1 event.

=== The Year's hard rock/metal ===
The artist can be both from Sweden or another country, and must be current with a tour during the period.

=== Time of Rockbjörnen ===
For all categories for the period: From the day after Rockbjörnen gala until the voting form closes. For example, for the year 2012: September 1, 2011 to August 2, 2012

== Livelöpet ==
'Livelöpet is an interactive digital scene on aftonbladet.se. where artists perform live concerts. At the concert, the audience can interact with both the artist and their Facebook friends through a variety of touch as to clap, shout, like songs, take pictures and post on Facebook, swaying with lighters and even making out with someone else in the audience. The artist takes part of all interactions.

Livelöpet was launched August 17, 2010 by Rockbjörnen Live, Aftonbladet's music prize since 1979, which that year went through a change and became a prize with focus on live performances. The investment was a strategic move to reposition Rockbjörnen from a traditional music prize to one that rewards the live scene in Sweden. The repositioning had its roots in the changing music industry underwent a technological paradigm shift (from about 1998 onwards) where music is increasingly consumed through digital media and the live scene grew stronger.

The first year seven Livelöpet concerts was performed, by Mando Diao, The Ark, Robyn, Salem Al Fakir, Ola, Anna Bergendahl och Eric Saade.

The artist plays live in the Aftonbladet studio. The concert streamed live over the web and with a custom-built application where the audience can interact with each other and the artist through various buttons. The artist takes part of the audience interaction via a monitor in the studio where all shouts appear in a live feed, just as the number of applause, waving lighters and snogging. A live update of the most requested songs are also listed on the monitor and the artist can choose whether it wants to meet the audience's wishes or not. Concerts can also be experienced with no impact if desired.

This can the audience do during the live concerts: Clap your hands, Shout, Wishing songs, Taking photos and post them on Facebook, Sway with the lighters, Make out with a Facebook friend or someone in the audience, See the concert without any effects

The total number of unique visitors was 44 000. Total number of interactions between audience and artists was 2.4 million. 29 million people worldwide were reached by the news of Livelöpet, which was spread through social media. The number of unique visitors to www.rockbjornen.se was increased with more than 300%. Traffic from 63 countries could be measured during the seven concerts.

There are a lot of advantages of the interactive digital scene Livelöpet. The artist reaches out to a large number of fans wherever they are geographically, and then reaches the so-called Long tail. The concert can be experienced by people who do not normally have the opportunity to get to or go to concerts, such as minors.

Unlike TV format, "meets" the fans their idol in the digital space when he or she takes part of all interactions from the audience.

The name Livelöpet (Live rennet) comes from the original idea where the idea was that the concert would be live in a banner on Aftonbladet.se. Then it would be without any interaction possibilities with the different buttons. The banner would be designed as a headline on which the sender is an evening paper, hence the name Livelöpet (live rennet).

Prior to the Swedish Parliamentary elections in 2010 there was a variant of Livelöpet; Live Square. Parliamentary party leaders' made speeches through the web and responded directly to questions from the audience. The audience was applauding or booing the party leaders’ voice, put on a party-button and take pictures of the speech which they could post on Facebook.

== SkapaTV ==
SkapaTV is an online and mobile tool released by Rockbjörnen which allows online users to create custom short music videos by assembling clips of performances and interviews from various artists.

Artists who have performed at SkapaTV: Norlie & KKV, Molly Sandén, Ulrik Munther, Dead By April, Icona Pop, Linnea Henriksson & Panetoz.
