= Tomas Ledin discography =

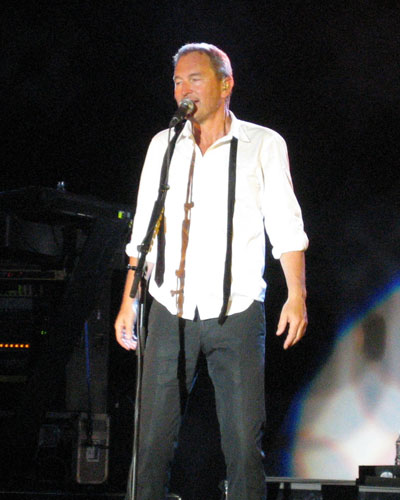
- Studio albums: 24
- Live albums: 3
- Compilation albums: 8
- Singles: 32
- Swedish language albums: 16
- English language albums: 5

Tomas Ledin released his first LP in 1972, which he recorded when he was just 19 years old. Since then, he has become one of the most successful Swedish singer/songwriters of the 1970s, 1980s, 1990s and 2000s. He has released numerous albums and has had many hit singles, charting in the Swedish Singles Chart as well as the important Swedish radio charts Svensktoppen and Trackslistan.

== Albums ==
=== Studio albums ===
List of albums, with selected chart positions and certifications
Title	Album details	Peak chart positions		Certifications
Title	Album details	SWE	FIN	Certifications
Restless Mind	Released: 1972; Label: RCA Victor	—	—	
Hjärtats rytm	Released: 1973; Label: RCA Victor	—	—	
Knivhuggarrock	Released: 1975; Label: Polydor	—	—	
Natten är ung	Released: 1976; Label: Polydor	—	—	
Tomas Ledin	Released: March 1977; Label: Polydor	7	—	
Fasten Seatbelts	Released: February 1978; Label: Polydor	8	—	
Ut på stan	Released: September 1979; Label: Polydor	9	—	
Lookin' for a Good Time	Released: October 1980; Label: Polar	14	26	
Gränslös	Released: April 1982; Label: Polar	11	30	
The Human Touch	Released: October 1982; Label: Polar	15	—	
Captured	Released: November 1983; Label: Polar	8	—	
Down on the Pleasure Avenue	Released: March 1988; Label: The Record Station	19	—	
Tillfälligheternas spel	Released: October 1990; Label: The Record Station	1	35	SWE: 2× Platinum
Du kan lita på mig	Released: April 1993; Label: The Record Station	1	6	SWE: Platinum
T	Released: October 1996; Label: Anderson Records	1	22	SWE: Platinum
Djävulen o ängeln	Released: October 2000; Label: Anderson Records	2	15	SWE: Platinum
Hela vägen	Released: June 2002; Label: Anderson Records	2	27	SWE: Platinum
Med vidöppna fönster	Released: March 2004; Label: Anderson Records	2	33	
Plektrum	Released: June 2006; Label: Universal	1	26	SWE: Gold
500 dagar om året	Released: June 2009; Label: Universal	2	33	SWE: Platinum
Restless Mind (Bonus Version - 2012 re-release)	Released: March 2012; Label: Universal	11	—	
Höga kusten	Released: October 2013; Label: Universal	1	—	
Inte ett moln så långt ögat kan nå	Released: 9 June 2017; Label: Universal	10	—	
Symphonia (with the Royal Stockholm Philharmonic Orchestra)	Released: 11 November 2022; Label: Playground	13	—	
Viker inte ner mig än	Released: 21 June 2024; Label: Playground	27	—	

=== Live albums ===
Title	Album details	Peak chart positions		Certifications
Title	Album details	SWE	FIN	Certifications
Tagen på bar gärning - "Live"	Released: October 1978; Label: Polydor	26	—	
En galen kväll	Released: May 1985; Label: Polar	16	—	
I sommarnattens ljus	Released: June 2003; Label: Anderson Records	3	35	SWE: Gold
"—" denotes album that did not chart or was not released

=== Compilation albums ===
Title	Album details	Peak chart positions			Certifications
Title	Album details	SWE	FIN	NOR	Certifications
71 – 73	Released: 1977; Label: Four Leaf Records	—	—	—	
Ett samlingsalbum 1990	Released: June 1990; Label: The Record Station	4	—	—	SWE: 2× Platinum
Sånger att älska till	Released: October 1997; Label: Anderson Records	7	—	—	SWE: Platinum
Vuodet 1972–2000 Åren	Released: May 2000; Warner Finland-only release	—	3	—	FIN: Gold
Festen har börjat – ett samlingsalbum 1972–2001	Released: May 2001; Label: Anderson Records	1	34	2	SWE: 3× Platinum
40/40: 40 År 40 Hits – Ett Samlingsalbum 1972–2012	Released: June 2012; Label: Universal	1	22	—	SWE: Platinum
Spår – 133 Sånger 1964–2014	Released: November 2014; Label: Universal	8	—	—	
50 år som sångskrivare & scenartist	Released: 4 March 2022; Label: Playground	22	—	—	
"—" denotes album that did not chart or was not released

== Extended plays ==
Title	EP details
Tolkningarna	Released: 25 December 2011; Label: Universal

== Singles and charted songs ==
The following list includes the singles which were released by Tomas Ledin as well as other songs that managed to reach one of the two most important radio charts in Sweden, Svensktoppen and Trackslistan. Not all of the listed titles were released as physical singles. If a song only appears on one of the radio charts and did not show up on the sales chart, it is a good indication that it wasn't available as a physical single, other than promo-releases.

In order to show how popular an artist like Tomas Ledin was and is in Sweden, the inclusion of the most important radio charts is necessary. As Stefan Heiding, author of several charts books, put it: "only these lists show how popular an artist or a song really was".

The following charts are included:

- Sverigetopplistan: the official Swedish singles chart, based on sales
- Svensktoppen: popular and important Swedish radio chart, based on votes. It has existed ever since 1962, with a short break between 1982 and 1985. Svensktoppen is compiled as a top 10 and has strict rules as to the inclusion of a song (like having to be sung in Swedish, which has changed recently).
- Trackslistan: Swedish radio chart, from 1984 until 2010. It was compiled as a top 20, and international acts were also included.
- Heta högen (HH): predecessor of Trackslistan and successor of Tio i Topp; it ran from 1974 until 1984 in the radio show Poporama and included songs voted in by the listeners. The songs were not presented in list-form, which means that no positions were available, just the number of weeks a song stayed on the chart. Depending on the year, each week's Heta högen featured a minimum of four to a maximum of 12 songs.
- Digilistan: Swedish radio show, which publishes a chart with the same name, featuring a top 60 of the most sold song titles in digital formats. The chart was first published in January 2007.

List of singles and songs, with Swedish chart positions
Title	Year	Singles Chart		Svensktoppen		Trackslistan		HH	Digilistan		Album
Title	Year	HP	TI	HP	TI	HP	TI	TI	HP	TI	Album
"Då ska jag spela"^{[A]}	1972	—	—	—	—	6	4	—	—	—	Non-album single
"I've Been Waiting for the Summer"	1972	—	—	—	—	—	—	—	—	—	Restless Mind
"Lay Me Your Body Down"	1972	—	—	—	—	—	—	—	—	—	Restless Mind
"Blå blå känslor"	1973	—	—	—	—	—	—	—	—	—	Hjärtats rytm
"Knivhuggarrock"	1975	—	—	—	—	—	—	—	—	—	Knivhuggarrock
"Kom tillbaka"	1975	—	—	—	—	—	—	1 w	—	—	Knivhuggarrock
"Watching the People"	1976	—	—	—	—	—	—	2 w	—	—	Non-album single
"Minns du Hollywood"	1977	3	14 w	10	1 w	—	—	3 w	—	—	Tomas Ledin
"På vingar av stål"	1978	—	—	10	2 w	—	—	1 w	—	—	Fasten Seatbelts
"Det ligger i luften"	1979	20	2 w	—	—	—	—	1 w	—	—	Ut på stan
"En gång till"	1979	—	—	—	—	—	—	—	—	—	Ut på stan
"Not Bad at All"	1979	10	14 w	—	—	—	—	3 w	—	—	Looking for a Good Time
"Just nu!"	1980	1	16 w	5	7 w	—	—	3 w	—	—	Looking for a Good Time
"Right Now!"	1980	—	—	—	—	—	—	—	—	—	Looking for a Good Time
"Open Up"	1980	11	2 w	—	—	—	—	2 w	—	—	Looking for a Good Time
"The Sun's Shinin' in the Middle of the Night"	1980	—	—	—	—	—	—	1 w	—	—	Looking for a Good Time
"A Little Love"	1981	—	—	—	—	—	—	—	—	—	Looking for a Good Time
"Sensuella Isabella"	1981	4	18 w	—	—	—	—	4 w	—	—	Non-album single
"Kärleken är som en studsande boll"	1982	15	6 w	—	—	—	—	—	—	—	Gränslös
"Sommaren är kort"	1982	7	10 w	7	4 w	—	—	—	—	—	Gränslös
"Never Again" with Agnetha Fältskog	1982	2	16 w	—	—	—	—	2 w	—	—	The Human Touch
"I Love You"	1983	—	—	—	—	—	—	—	—	—	The Human Touch
"What Are You Doing Tonight?"	1983	8	14 w	—	—	—	—	3 w	—	—	Captured
"Det finns inget finare än kärleken"	1983	20	4 w	—	—	—	—	—	—	—	Non-album single
"Don't Touch That Dial"	1984	—	—	—	—	—	—	2 w	—	—	Captured
"Everybody Wants to Hear It"	1984	—	—	—	—	—	—	1 w	—	—	Captured
"Svenska flickor"	1985	18	4 w	—	—	18	1 w	—	—	—	En galen kväll
"Crazy About You"	1988	—	—	—	—	19	2 w	—	—	—	Down on the Pleasure Avenue
"Who's That Lucky Guy"	1988	—	—	—	—	23**	—	—	—	—	Down on the Pleasure Avenue
"Another Summernight"	1988	—	—	—	—	—	—	—	—	—	Down on the Pleasure Avenue
"Keep Your Eyes Open"	1989	—	—	—	—	—	—	—	—	—	Down on the Pleasure Avenue
"En samlingsmix"	1990	6	14 w	—	—	—	—	—	—	—	Ett samlingsalbum
"En del av mitt hjärta"	1990	2	12 w	1	27 w	4	7 w	—	—	—	Tillfälligheternas spel
"Hon gör allt för att göra mig lycklig"	1990	7	6 w	3	11 w	3	4 w	—	—	—	Tillfälligheternas spel
"Här kommer den nya tiden"	1991	—	—	—	—	16	2 w	—	—	—	Tillfälligheternas spel
"Snart tystnar musiken"	1991	—	—	1	27 w	4	5 w	—	—	—	Tillfälligheternas spel
"En dag på stranden"	1991	20	6 w	—	—	14	3 w	—	—	—	Tillfälligheternas spel
"Släpp hästarna fria"	1993	20	6 w	3	6 w	22**	—	—	—	—	Du kan lita på mig
"Du kan lita på mig"	1993	—	—	3	12 w	14	2 w	—	—	—	Du kan lita på mig
"Nyckeln till dig"	1993	—	—	—	—	—	—	—	—	—	Du kan lita på mig
"En vind av längtan"	1993	—	—	9	1 w	—	—	—	—	—	Du kan lita på mig
"Lika hopplöst förälskad"	1996	12	11 w	—	—	24**	—	—	—	—	T
"Varje steg för oss närmare varann"	1997	—	—	14*	—	22**	—	—	—	—	T
"För dina ögon skull"	1997	—	—	—	—	—	—	—	—	—	T
"Håll om mig en sista gång"	1997	—	—	11*	—	—	—	—	—	—	Sånger att älska till 1972–1997
"Hopp (om en ljusare värld)"	2000	25	3 w	6	4 w	—	—	—	—	—	Djävulen och ängeln
"Du om någon borde veta"	2001	—	—	12*	—	—	—	—	—	—	Djävulen och ängeln
"Hon brukar vänta på bussen"	2001	—	—	11*	—	—	—	—	—	—	Djävulen och ängeln
"Det blir inte alltid som man tänkt sig"	2001	—	—	12*	—	—	—	—	—	—	Djävulen och ängeln
"En lång väg tillsammans"	2002	—	—	15*	—	—	—	—	—	—	Hela vägen
"Helt galen i dig"	2002	—	—	11*	—	—	—	—	—	—	Hela vägen
"En man som älskar"	2003	25	9 w	15*	—	—	—	—	—	—	I sommarnattens ljus
"Lova mig att du är där"	2003	—	—	10	1 w	—	—	—	—	—	I sommarnattens ljus
"(Vad gör du med mig) Louise"	2004	—	—	13*	—	—	—	—	—	—	Med vidöppna fönster
"Vem kunde ana"	2004	—	—	7	2 w	—	—	—	—	—	Med vidöppna fönster
"Gilla läget"	2006	14	17 w	9	1 w	25**	—	—	—	—	Plektrum
"Vi är på gång – VM 2006"	2006	5	7 w	11*	—	—	—	—	—	—	Plektrum
"Jag kanske inte säger det så ofta"	2006	—	—	14*	—	—	—	—	—	—	Plektrum
"Änglar i snön"	2006	—	—	12*	—	—	—	—	—	—	Plektrum
"Håll ut"	2009	42	3 w	13*	—	—	—	—	40	3 w	500 dagar om året
"500 dagar om året"	2009	16	1 w	4	9 w	—	—	—	16	1 w	500 dagar om året
"Kanske kvällens sista dans"	2010	—	—	10	3 w	—	—	—	—	—	500 dagar om året
"Vem tänder stjärnorna"	2011	—	—	—	—	—	—	—	26	1 w	Så mycket bättre säsong 2
"Gott folk"	2011	—	—	—	—	—	—	—	—	—	Så mycket bättre säsong 2
"Dansa i neon"	2011	—	—	—	—	—	—	—	58	1 w	Så mycket bättre säsong 2
"Set the World on Fire"	2011	—	—	—	—	—	—	—	19	2 w	Så mycket bättre säsong 2
"Bjurö klubb"	2011	—	—	—	—	—	—	—	57	2 w	Så mycket bättre säsong 2
"Den jag kunde va (Till Björn Afzelius)"	2011	—	—	2	46 w	—	—	—	28	2 w	Så mycket bättre säsong 2
"Too Many Days (Version 1972–2012)"	2012	—	—	—	—	—	—	—	—	—	Restless Mind (2012 Bonus Version)
"As One" with Eagle-Eye Cherry	2012	—	—	12*	—	—	—	—	—	—	Non-album single
"Hammarn unner bönninga"	2013	—	—	11*	—	—	—	—	—	—	Höga kusten
"Ljuvliga minnen"	2014	—	—	13*	—	—	—	—	—	—	Höga kusten
"Livs levande"	2015	—	—	—	—	—	—	—	—	—	Non-album single
"—" denotes releases that did not chart
" * " denotes songs that were tested for Svensktoppen, but did not enter the final Top10
" ** " denotes "Bubbling under" songs that did not enter the Tracklistan Top20

^{A} entry in Tio i Topp, predecessor of Trackslistan
