= 2012 in European music =

2012 in continental European music in geographical order. See also 2012 in music.

== Scandinavia ==
- Loreen wins the Eurovision Song Contest 2012 with Euphoria which is also a top seller across Europe and the album Heal tops the Swedish charts for one week but her other singles don't even crack the Top 10 in her own country.
- Mando Diao rise to the top with their first Swedish album Infruset, so does 60- year old veteran Tomas Ledin with the compilation 40/40: 40 År 40 Hits – Ett Samlingsalbum 1972–2012.
- Avicii 2011 single Levels wins the Swedish Grammis.
- Swedish House Mafia announce that they will be breaking up, and that they would embark on One Last Tour finishing at Ultra Music Festival in March 2013.
- Lukas Graham from Copenhagen occupy Denmark's album No. 1 for 8 weeks with their debut Lukas Graham, the singles ""Drunk in the Morning" and "Better Than Yourself (Criminal Mind) Part 2" also top the charts.
- Danish Singer-songwriter Rasmus Seebach's second album Mer' end kærlighed reaches just like his debut 10 times Platinum, I mine øjne is a No. 1 single.
- Of Monsters and Men have a rare hit for an Icelandic band, Little Talks reaches the Top 10 in several European countries, including No.1 in Ireland, and No. 1 on US Alternative Songs. The album My Head Is an Animal reaches No. 1 in Australia and Ireland and Top5 in Germany and Canada.

== Netherlands ==
- Sandra van Nieuwland's debut album "And More" becomes a No. 1 like her cover versions Keep Your Head Up and Beggin' even though she didn't win The Voice of Holland.
- Holland's biggest three-day Pinkpop Festival is held at Landgraaf.

== Belgium ==
- Trip hop band Hooverphonic top the charts for the second time after a ten-year wait with the album Hooverphonic with Orchestra, so does Triggerfinger's live album Faders Up 2 - Live in Amsterdam ft their No. 1 cover version of I Follow Rivers.
- The celebrated Rock Werchter sees 85,000 visitors on each of its four days. The country's second biggest Pukkelpop festival goes ahead without incident after deaths in the years before.

== Germany ==
- The veterans sell well, Udo Lindenberg stays at No. 1 with his 2011 "MTV Unplugged – Live aus dem Hotel Atlantic" and Die Toten Hosen have a charttopping album with Ballast der Republik; Tage wie diese, also Platinum in Austria and Switzerland, is only their second No. 1 single after 1996's Zehn kleine Jägermeister.
- Rapper Cro, however, who sports a panda mask and has a No. 1 album with Raop and a big hit with the relaxed "Eazy", is a newcomer.
- 2010 Eurovision winner Lena Meyer-Landrut's third album is the first not to reach No. 1, Stardust and the eponymous single Stardust both reach second place and Gold status.
- Rock am Ring and Rock im Park are the biggest local festivals, more than 80,000 attend Wacken Open Air Heavy Metal festival.

== Switzerland ==
- Veteran rockers Züri West have their seventh No. 1 album with "Göteborg". Luca Hänni who won the German talent show Deutschland sucht den Superstar achieves the same with his debut "My Name Is Luca".

== France ==
- Sexion d'Assaut top the album charts for 5 weeks and reach Diamond with L’Apogée. Charity project Les Enfoirés follow through with Le bal des Enfoirés.

== Spain ==
- Superstar Alejandro Sanz has another No. 1 album with La Música No Se Toca.
- Pablo Alborán is the hottest young act, his Perdóname is No. 1 in Portugal for no less than 25 weeks and his live album En Acústico is No. 1 in Spain and Portugal, studio album Tanto also climbs to the top.

== Italy ==
- Veteran Biagio Antonacci from Milan is No. 1 for 7 weeks with Sapessi dire no.
- Sicilian project Tacabro (in Italy also known as "Romano & Sapienza feat. Rodríguez") have a hit across Europe with Tacata'.
- Emma Marrone from Florence has two more No. 1 singles with "Non è l'inferno" and "Cercavo amore" and tours with her album Sarò libera. Her break-up with boyfriend Stefano De Martino fills the pages of the Italian yellow press.

== Eastern Europe ==
- Dima Bilan from Russia wins MTV Europe Music Award for Best European Act.
- Sziget Festival Budapest has about 65,000 visitors on each of its six days.
- Open'er Festival at the Gdynia airport remains the largest Polish open-air music and performing arts festival.

== Deaths ==
- 9 January – Bridie Gallagher, Ireland's first pop singer (b. 1924)
- 14 February – Tonmi Lillman, Finnish drummer and producer (Lordi, Sinergy, To/Die/For, and Ajattara) (b. 1973)
