= 2 steg från Paradise =

Studio album by Håkan Hellström
- Released: 13 October 2010
- Recorded: 2009–2010
- Genre: Pop, Folk rock
- Length: 48:03
- Label: Universal
- Producer: Håkan Hellström, Joakim Åhlund

Håkan Hellström chronology
För sent för Edelweiss (2008)	2 steg från Paradise (2010)	Det kommer aldrig va över för mig (2013)

Professional ratings
Review scores
Source	Rating
Allmusic	2.5/5 stars

2 steg från Paradise is the sixth studio album by Swedish singer Håkan Hellström, released on 13 October 2010. It was produced by Håkan Hellström in collaboration with Joakim Åhlund. Many of the songs were written together with The Soundtrack of our Lives' guitarist Björn Olsson, who also produced Hellström's third studio album Ett kolikbarns bekännelser. A double A-side single featuring "Saknade te havs" and "River en vacker dröm" was released prior to the album, on 11 September. "River en vacker dröm" was originally meant to be performed at 2010's edition of Way Out West only. However, nearing the release of the album, Hellström chose to record it as well.

== Track listing ==
No.	Title	English translation	Length
1.	"Det här är min tid"	This Is My Time	3:20
2.	"Saknade te havs"	Lost at Sea	3:44
3.	"Shelley"	Shelley	3:12
4.	"River en vacker dröm"	Tearing Down a Beautiful Dream	4:54
5.	"2 steg från paradise"	2 Steps from Paradise	5:48
6.	"Jag vet vilken dy hon varit i"	I Know the Mire She's Been In	3:05
7.	"Dom där jag kommer från"	Those Where I Come From	5:35
8.	"Det dom aldrig nämner"	What They Never Mention	4:46
9.	"Vid protesfabrikens stängsel"	By the Prosthesis Factory Fence	3:29
10.	"Man måste dö några gånger innan man kan leva"	You Have to Die a Few Times Before You Can Live	4:47
11.	"Du är snart där"	You'll Soon Be There	7:23
Total length:			48:03

== Charts ==
The album debuted at number one on the Swedish Albums Chart. It also entered the Norwegian Albums Chart at number four.

=== Weekly charts ===
Chart (2010)	Peak position
Norwegian Albums (VG-lista)	4
Swedish Albums (Sverigetopplistan)	1

=== Year-end charts ===
Chart (2010)	Position
Swedish Albums (Sverigetopplistan)	4
Chart (2011)	Position
Swedish Albums (Sverigetopplistan)	48
