= Raj Montana Band =

- Genres: Rock; country rock; soft rock; folk rock
- Years active: 1976–1985; 1997; 2017–present
- Members: Dan Hylander; Clarence Öfwerman; Hasse Olsson; David Carlson; Ola Johansson; Pelle Alsing
- Website: rajmontanaband.com

Raj Montana Band is a Swedish pop and rock band that also served as a backing band for Swedish singers Dan Hylander and Py Bäckman, originally named Raj Montana and his Moonlight Boys. It dissolved in 1985 and reformed in 1997 for reunion tours and compilation album of earlier hits.

== Members ==
Members of the band has varied over the years. Many of them were part of what in the 1980s as "Studioeliten". But the main setup in the band's heyday (1980–1985) were:

- Pelle Alsing - drums
- Clarence Öfwerman - Keyboards
- David Carlson - guitar
- Ola Johansson - bass
- Hasse Olsson - organ and keyboards

Other musicians associated with the band on various projects include Mats Ronander, Åke Sundqvist, Mats Englund, Tove Naess, Anne-Lie Rydé and Håkan Nyberg.

== Discography ==
Studio albums

Year	Album	Credits	Peak positions
Year	Album	Credits	SWE
1980	Döende oskuld	Raj Montana Band	48
1982	Bella notte	Dan Hylander & Raj Montana Band	3
1983	Sista föreställningen	Py Bäckman & Raj Montana Band	4
1984	...om änglar & sjakaler	Dan Hylander & Raj Montana Band	3

Live albums

- 1982: Bella Notte
- 1982: Belle De Jour
- 1985: Tele-Gram Långt Farväl

Compilation albums

Year	Album	Credits	Peak positions
Year	Album	Credits	SWE
1997	Hits or Hits! 1980-97	Raj Montana Band, Py Bäckman & Dan Hylander	15
1998	Svenska popfavoriter - 15 hits	Raj Montana Band	–
