= 500 dagar om året (song) =

Single by Tomas Ledin

from the album 500 dagar om året
- A-side: "500 dagar om året"
- Released: 15 May 2009
- Genre: pop
- Length: 3:54
- Label: Universal, Acasso
- Songwriter(s): Tomas Ledin
- Producer(s): Lasse Andersson

Tomas Ledin singles chronology
"Håll ut" (2009)	"500 dagar om året" (2009)	"Too Many Days" (2009)

"500 dagar om året" is a song written by Swedish musician Tomas Ledin, and recorded on his 2009 studio album 500 dagar om året. It was also released as a downloadable single the same year. The album version is longer than the single version.

The single peaked at 16th position at the Swedish singles chart. It also charted at Svensktoppen 2009 for nine weeks, peaking at 4th position.

== Track listing ==
1. "500 dagar om året" – 3:54

== Chart positions ==
Year (2009)	Peak position
Sweden	16
