= Känn ingen sorg för mig Göteborg =

Studio album by Håkan Hellström
- Released: 16 October 2000
- Genre: Indie pop; jangle pop; power pop
- Length: 38:23
- Label: Virgin; Delores
- Producer: Mattias Glavå, Håkan Hellström

Håkan Hellström chronology
Känn ingen sorg för mig Göteborg (2000)	Det är så jag säger det (2002)

Känn ingen sorg för mig Göteborg is the debut studio album from Swedish musician Håkan Hellström. It was released on 16 October 2000. The album has sold over 40,000 copies, which equals a platinum certification in Sweden.

== Music and lyrics ==
Musically, the album has been described as a Swedish version of Born to Run-era Bruce Springsteen, with upbeat songs, ringy guitars, trumpet leads and vocal harmonies. Lyrically, Hellström drew inspiration from his musical and lyrical heroes such as Morrissey and Bob Dylan, and the topics are often bittersweet or melancholic reflections of unrequited love, decadent youth culture (including drug use) or the feeling of being an outsider. For example, the song "Atombomb" contains references to Morrissey's "Everyday Is Like Sunday" and The Smiths' "William, It Was Really Nothing", while "Uppsnärjd i det blå" refers to Dylan's "Tangled Up in Blue" and "I Think We're Alone Now" by Tommy James & the Shondells.

== Accolades ==
The album won the 2000 Rockbjörnen in the category "Swedish record of the year", and was nominated for six Grammis the following year, winning one. Swedish music magazine Sonic named it the second best Swedish album ever in June 2013.

== Track listing ==
All songs written by H. Hellström except when otherwise stated

1. "Känn ingen sorg för mig Göteborg", Feel No Sorrow For Me, Gothenburg
2. "En vän med en bil", A Friend with a Car
3. "Ramlar", Falling
4. "Nu kan du få mig så lätt", Now You Can Get Me So Easily
5. "Vi två, 17 år", Us Two, 17 Years
6. "Uppsnärjd i det blå", Tangled Up in Blue (Hellström/Gilbert/Neckvall/Räisänen)
7. "Jag var bara inte gjord för dessa dar", I Just Wasn't Made For These Days
8. "Magiskt, men tragiskt", Magical, But Tragical (Hellström/Källman)
9. "Atombomb", Nuclear Bomb
10. "Dom dimmiga dagarna", The Foggy Days (Hellström/Theodor Jensen, Swedish version of "Foggy days", later released by The Plan)

== Singles ==
The first four tracks were also issued as singles. "Känn ingen sorg för mig Göteborg" was Hellström's first single, issued on 8 May 2000. Its B-side was "Vi två, 17 år". "Ramlar" was released one week before the album with "Ge mig arsenik" (a demo version of "Känn ingen sorg för mig Göteborg") as B-side. The second single, "En vän med en bil", was released on 19 February 2001 and appeared on the soundtrack for the Swedish movie Festival. The B-side, "Här kommer lyckan för hundar som oss", returned on the second album, Det är så jag säger det. The third and last single from the album was "Nu kan du få mig så lätt", released on 18 June 2001, while "Jag var bara inte gjord för dessa dar" was the B-side.

== Charts ==
=== Weekly charts ===
Chart (2000–2001)	Position	Certifications
Sweden (Sverigetopplistan)	1	GLF: Platinum

=== Year-end charts ===
Chart	Year	Position
Swedish Albums (Sverigetopplistan)	2001	14
Swedish Albums (Sverigetopplistan)	2002	90
Swedish Albums (Sverigetopplistan)	2022	85
Swedish Albums (Sverigetopplistan)	2024	95
Swedish Albums (Sverigetopplistan)	2025	55
