= Plektrum =

Studio album by Tomas Ledin
- Released: 14 June 2006
- Recorded: 2005, 2006
- Genre: Pop
- Length: 40:59
- Label: Universal Music, (171 400-7)
- Producer: Jörgen Ingeström, Bo Reimer, Lasse Andersson

Tomas Ledin chronology
Med vidöppna fönster (2004)	Plektrum (2006)	500 dagar om året (2009)

Singles from Plektrum
- 1. "Gilla läget" Released: 12 April 2006; 2. "Vi är på gång – VM 2006" Released: 10 May 2006

Alternative cover
- Plektrum + Ledin Live 2006

Plektrum is the 19th studio album by Swedish singer-songwriter Tomas Ledin, released in June 2006. In November of the same year, the album was re-issued as a 2-CD-set with a bonus track on disc 1 as well as a full bonus disc, called Ledin Live 2006, featuring 14 tracks recorded during Ledin's summer tour 2006.

== Album information ==
After taking a somewhat different musical direction with its predecessor Med vidöppna fönster in 2004, Tomas Ledin was back with a typical pop/rock album in June 2006 when he released "Plektrum". The title of the album comes from the so-called plectrum, a small flat tool which is used for playing string instruments, most commonly a guitar. Consequently, the sound on this album relies heavily on electric and acoustic guitar sound. Half of the 10 tracks on "Plektrum" are up-tempo pop/rock compositions (tracks 1, 2, 3, 5, 9), whereas the other half are ballads with a typical Ledin sound and, as for the example of "Hela huset sov", critical lyrics.

Recording for the album took place in Bell Studio, Stockholm, with the exception of "Jag kanske inte säger det så ofta", which was recorded at Boon Studio and produced by Lasse Andersson. The rest of the album was produced by Jörgen Ingeström and Bo Reimer.

== Track listing ==
Plektrum
No.	Title	Writer(s)	Title (English translation)	Length
1.	"Inte en chans"	Tomas Ledin	Not a chance	3:54
2.	"Ja' ville va'"	Tomas Ledin	I wanted to be	3:01
3.	"Gilla läget"	Tomas Ledin	Like the situation	3:21
4.	"Jag kanske inte säger det så ofta"	Tomas Ledin, Lasse Andersson	I might not say it very often	4:30
5.	"Om så bara för en kväll"	Tomas Ledin	If only for one night	3:48
6.	"Sången om en kvinna och en man"	Tomas Ledin, Rolf Eriksson	Song about a woman and a man	5:32
7.	"Hela huset sov"	Tomas Ledin	The whole house was asleep	5:08
8.	"Änglar i snön"	Tomas Ledin, Dan Hylander	Angels in the snow	3:49
9.	"Vi är på gång – VM 2006"	Tomas Ledin	We are on the run	3:13
10.	"Snart"	Tomas Ledin	Soon	4:37
Total length:				40:59

Plektrum, Re-issue, bonus track
No.	Title	Writer(s)	Title (English translation)	Length
11.	"Änglar i snön" (Decemberversion)	Tomas Ledin, Dan Hylander	Angels in the snow	3:35
Total length:				44:34

Ledin Live 2006 (bonus CD)
No.	Title	Writer(s)	Title (English translation)	Length
1.	"Inte en chans"	Tomas Ledin	Not a chance	4:22
2.	"Lika hopplöst förälskad"	Tomas Ledin	Like hopelessly in love	5:42
3.	"På vingar av stål"	Tomas Ledin	On wings of steel	5:03
4.	"Det ligger i luften"	Tomas Ledin	It's in the air	2:19
5.	"Jag kanske inte säger det så ofta"	Tomas Ledin, Lasse Andersson	I might not say it very often	5:17
6.	"Ja' ville va'"	Tomas Ledin	I wanted to be	3:01
7.	"I natt är jag din"	Tomas Ledin	Tonight I am yours	7:30
8.	"Sommaren är kort"	Tomas Ledin	The summer is short	4:24
9.	"En del av mitt hjärta"	Tomas Ledin	A part of my heart	5:54
10.	"Gilla läget"	Tomas Ledin	Like the situation	4:44
11.	"Just nu"	Tomas Ledin	Right now	3:48
12.	"Om så bara för en kväll"	Tomas Ledin	If only for one night	7:02
13.	"Hon gör allt för att göra mig lycklig"	Tomas Ledin	She does everything to make me happy	4:06
14.	"Sensuella Isabella"	Tomas Ledin	Sensual Isabella	7:20
Total length:				70:40

== Singles and reception ==
Vi är på gång single cover

"Plektrum" includes a re-recording of the Ledin composition "Vi är på gång", which was originally released in 1983 in Swedish and English ("We're On The Beat"). In 2006, the title became Sweden's official song for this year's soccer world championships, the 2006 FIFA World Cup, in Germany. For this occasion, Ledin party re-wrote the lyrics and released the song on single in May 2006. Predictably, the single charted high in the Swedish Singles Chart and eventually gave Ledin his biggest chart-hit since 1990s "En del av mitt hjärta" by reaching the top5. According to IFPI Sweden, the single was certified 4× Platinum as early as 17 May, just a week after its release.

The first single released from "Plektrum", some two months before the album was released, was "Gilla läget", a modern combination of pop and rock. The single immediately entered the Swedish Singles Chart and stayed on it for 17 weeks, eventually peaking at number 14. Additionally, it also managed to enter the important Swedish radio chart Svensktoppen for one week at number 9.

The album itself entered the Swedish albums chart, Sverigetopplistan, at number 1, becoming Ledin's first studio album in ten years which topped the charts. In August, the album was certified Gold.

Two more tracks from "Plektrum" were tested for the Svensktoppen charts in summer and winter 2006: "Jag kanske inte säger det så ofta" and "Änglar i snön". However, neither one managed to enter the top10.

== Re-release: Ledin Live 2006 ==
Tomas Ledin's live album Live sommar 2006

On 29 November 2006, "Plektrum" was re-released as a 2-CD set. For this re-issue, the word "Ledin" on the cover was coloured in red instead of yellow. Besides including a new version of the track "Änglar i snön" on disc 1, the second disc of this 2-CD set featured 14 songs which were recorded during Tomas Ledin's live tour the previous summer. This bonus disc, titled "Ledin Live 2006", is a shortened version of a digital album called "Live sommar 2006", which had been released on 14 August 2006. This original version included three more tracks, making it a total of 17, which was the complete live-set of Ledin's tour that summer.

Live sommar 2006
No.	Title	Writer(s)	Title (English translation)	Length
1.	"Inte en chans"	Tomas Ledin	Not a chance	4:22
2.	"Lika hopplöst förälskad"	Tomas Ledin	Like hopelessly in love	5:42
3.	"På vingar av stål"	Tomas Ledin	On wings of steel	5:03
4.	"Det ligger i luften"	Tomas Ledin	It's in the air	2:19
5.	"Jag kanske inte säger det så ofta"	Tomas Ledin, Lasse Andersson	I might not say it very often	5:17
6.	"En dag på stranden"	Tomas Ledin	A day at the beach	5:18
7.	"Helt galen i dig"	Tomas Ledin	Totally crazy about you	4:17
8.	"Ja' ville va'"	Tomas Ledin	I wanted to be	3:01
9.	"I natt är jag din"	Tomas Ledin	Tonight I am yours	7:30
10.	"Sommaren är kort"	Tomas Ledin	The summer is short	4:24
11.	"En del av mitt hjärta"	Tomas Ledin	A part of my heart	5:54
12.	"Gilla läget"	Tomas Ledin	Like the situation	4:44
13.	"Just nu"	Tomas Ledin	Right now	3:48
14.	"En man som älskar"	Tomas Ledin	A man who loves	3:51
15.	"Om så bara för en kväll"	Tomas Ledin	If only for one night	7:02
16.	"Hon gör allt för att göra mig lycklig"	Tomas Ledin	She does everything to make me happy	4:06
17.	"Sensuella Isabella"	Tomas Ledin	Sensual Isabella	7:20
Total length:				no

== Personnel ==
The following musicians participated in the recording sessions for the "Plektrum" album:

- Tomas Ledin: vocals, guitar
- Jörgen Ingeström: keyboard, drums-programming, bass-programming, guitar, background vocals
- Sebastian Nylund: guitar
- Ove Andersson: bass, backing vocals
- Bo Reimer: percussion
- Lasse Andersson: keyboard, drums, guitar, percussion
- Joakim Milder: String-arrangement, conductor
- Stockholm Session Strings
- Matthias Venge: guitar
- Gustav Pettersson: background vocals

additional for bonus track on disc 1 ("Änglar i snön" decemberversion):

- Ola Gustavsson: guitar
- Jarmo Lindell: bass
- Johan Franzon: drums, percussion

The live recordings on the bonus disc "Ledin Live 2006" feature the following musicians:

- Tomas Ledin: vocals, guitar, harmonica
- Jörgen Ingströn: keyboard, background vocals
- Sebastian Nylund: guitar, background vocals
- Ove Andersson: bass
- Johan Franzon: drums
