= The Plan (band) =

Swedish band

- Origin: Gothenburg, Sweden
- Years active: 2000 - present
- Labels: Virgin, EMI, Majesty, Razzia
- Members: Theodor Jensen
- Past members: Mikael Furugärde; Niklas Korssell; Peter Morén
- Website: www.theplanmusic.com

The Plan is a Swedish band formed by Broder Daniel guitarist and subsequent bass player Theodor Jensen in 2000.

== History ==
After having written own songs for a period of time, Jensen met organist Mikael Furugärde, drummer Niklas Korssell and bass player Peter Morén through mutual friends. The group recorded its first demo in the winter of 2000-2001 and were signed by EMI in early 2001. By that time, Jensen's childhood friend and Broder Daniel bandmate Håkan Hellström had – on his highly successful debut album Känn ingen sorg för mig Göteborg – already released an interpretation in Swedish of the Plan's song "Foggy Days" (called "Dom dimmiga dagarna").

The self-titled debut album was recorded during the summer of 2001 together with producer Ronald Bood, and at the time of its release in September that year, the first single "Mon Amour" was already climbing the charts. The album entered the Swedish charts at number 2, and was nominated for Grammis awards in four categories: best debut act, best album, best pop/rock group, and best composer. The album was followed by a tour in Europe, as well as performances at South by Southwest in Austin and CBGB in New York City. However, despite the success of the band, drummer Niklas Korssell and bass player Peter Morén left the band in 2002 to pursue their own musical projects.

In 2004, Theodor Jensen left Broder Daniel, where he had been playing bass following Håkan Hellström's departure in 2002. The Plan's sophomore album "Embrace me beauty" was released in September that year and received mixed reviews. Later in 2004, organist Mikael Furugärde – whom Jensen considers his "ideologic brother" – left to focus on the finalization of his third novel, leaving the Plan a one man band.

The band's third record Walk for Gold was recorded with Theodor Jensen as the only permanent member under the supervision of producer Jari Haapalainen. It was released in October 2006 and was well received by music critics.

Although Theodor Jensen is the sole remaining member of the Plan, he decided not to release his 2009 solo album "Tough Love" under the Plan name, saying he was relieved to get away from its history.

== Band members ==
- Theodor Jensen – vocals, guitars, bass, banjo, mandolin
- Mikael Furugärde – organ, electric piano (quit after their second album)
- Niklas Korssell – drums, percussion (quit after their first album)
- Peter Morén – bass guitar (quit after their first album)

== Discography ==
=== Albums ===
Year	Album	Label	Chart	Reviews
2001	The Plan	Virgin	2	The Plan at AllMusic
2004	Embrace Me Beauty	EMI	31	
2006	Walk for Gold	Razzia	38	

=== Singles ===
Year	Single	Album	Chart
2001	"Mon Amour"	The Plan	10
2001	"Let's Leave"	The Plan	
2002	"Slow Fall"	The Plan	
2002	"Fell a Mile"	The Plan	
2004	"Friends Getting Cold"	Embrace Me Beauty	57
2004	"Young & Armed"	Embrace Me Beauty	
2006	"Walk for Gold"	Walk for Gold	
