= Peter Morén =

Swedish musician (born 1976)

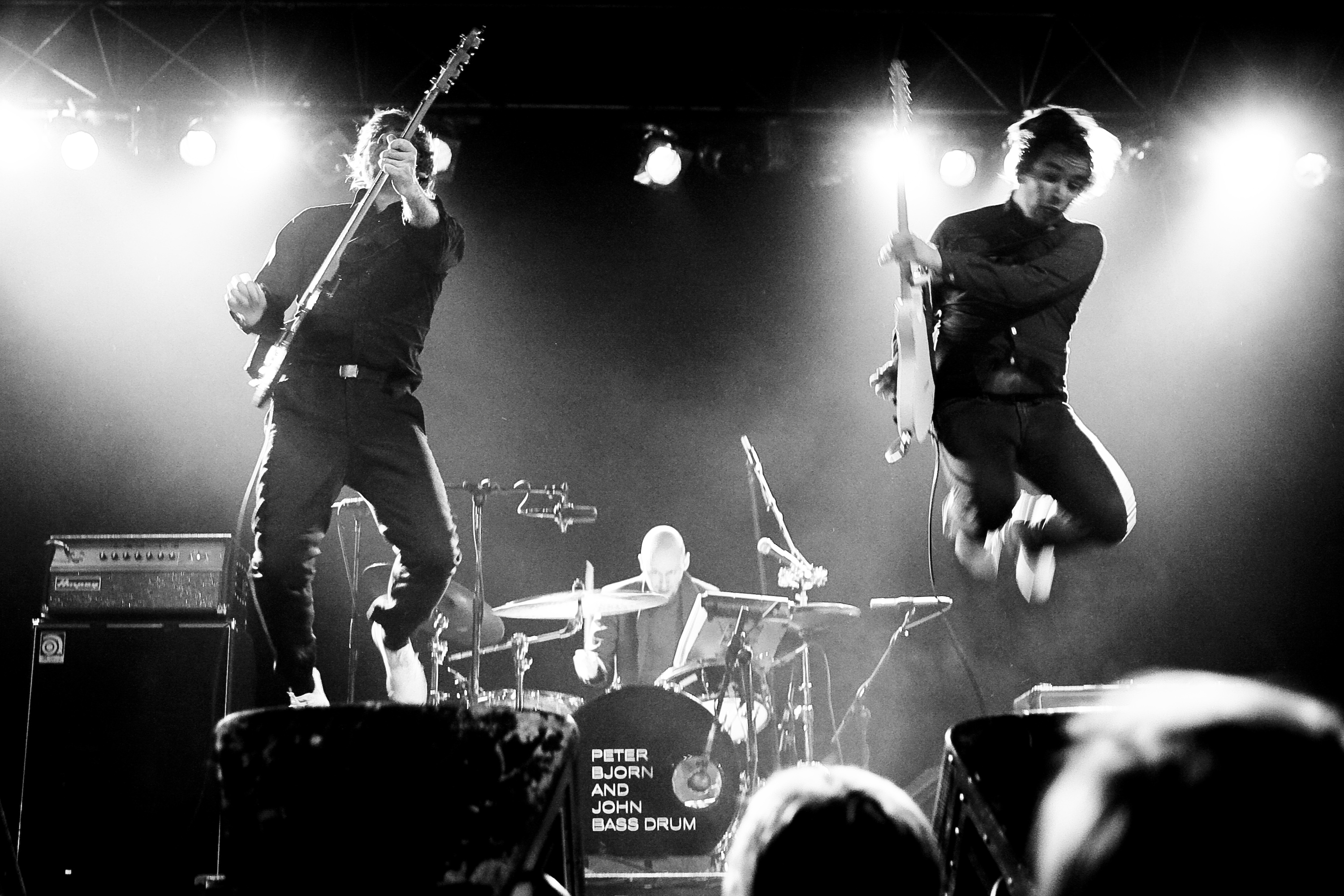
- Morén (right) performing with Peter Bjorn and John in 2007

Background information
- Born: 5 May 1976 (age 50); Mora, Sweden
- Occupations: Musician
- Years active: 1999–present
- Labels: Morén Pop, Wichita Recordings, INGRID

Peter Andreas Morén (born 5 May 1976) is a Swedish musician. He is the guitarist and vocalist of the indie rock trio Peter Bjorn and John. He is also a founding member of the Stockholm-based artist collective INGRID.

He was born and raised in Mora, and started his musical career playing the violin, but soon changed to the guitar. His musical interest made him move to the town Västerås, where he entered a high school music programme at the Carlforsska gymnasiet and met Björn Yttling. Marit Bergman also studied at the high school at the same time.

In 1999, when Morén was studying film science in Stockholm, he met John Eriksson at a party and they began discussing the comic Phantom and indie rock band Lilys. After the meeting, they started to jam together with Morén's friend Björn Yttling, which ended up in the creation of Peter Bjorn and John. During this period, Morén had also joined The Plan, playing bass on their 2001 self-titled debut album. However, in 2002 he decided to leave the group to concentrate on Peter Bjorn and John's first record.

Morén has released four solo albums; in April 2008 he released a solo album in English, The Last Tycoon followed in 2010 by the Swedish-language I Spåren Av Tåren. His third solo album, Pyramiden, was released in late 2012 and is named after the ghost town of Pyramiden as well as referring to the pyramid as a tomb and to abstract concepts such as pyramid schemes. The album's first single, 'Odyssén', was released prior to the album with the b-side 'Vinstintressen'. A one-track digital download of the second single followed, the Swedish-language version of the song 'Say My Name', previously featured (sung in English) on the INGRID compilation album Volym 1. In early 2017 he released another solo album, 40, featuring multiple collaborations and covers. In 2019, he paired up with fellow Swedish pop songwriter David Shutrick to release the collaborative EP En Åldrande Befolkning. Later that year, the duo recorded three more songs and re-released En Åldrande Befolkning as a full-length album. The album features as its cover artwork an unattributed painting found at a flea market.

== Discography ==
=== Albums ===
- The Last Tycoon (2008)
- I Spåren Av Tåren (2010)
- Pyramiden (2012)
- 40 (2017)
- En Åldrande Befolkning (with David Shutrick) (2019)

=== Singles and EPs ===
- Social Competence (2008)
- Reel Too Real (2008)
- Esther (2010)
- Odyssén (2012)
- Säg Mitt Namn (2012)
- Tröstpriset (2012)
- Broken Swenglish Vol. 1 EP (2013)
- Broken Swenglish Vol. 2 EP (2014)
- Rytmen I Blodet / Mitt Bästa Porslin (2016)
- Pärleporten (2016)
- 100 År (with David Shutrick) (2019)
- Oljud (with David Shutrick) (2019)
