= Anne-Lie Rydé =

Swedish pop and rock singer (born 1956)

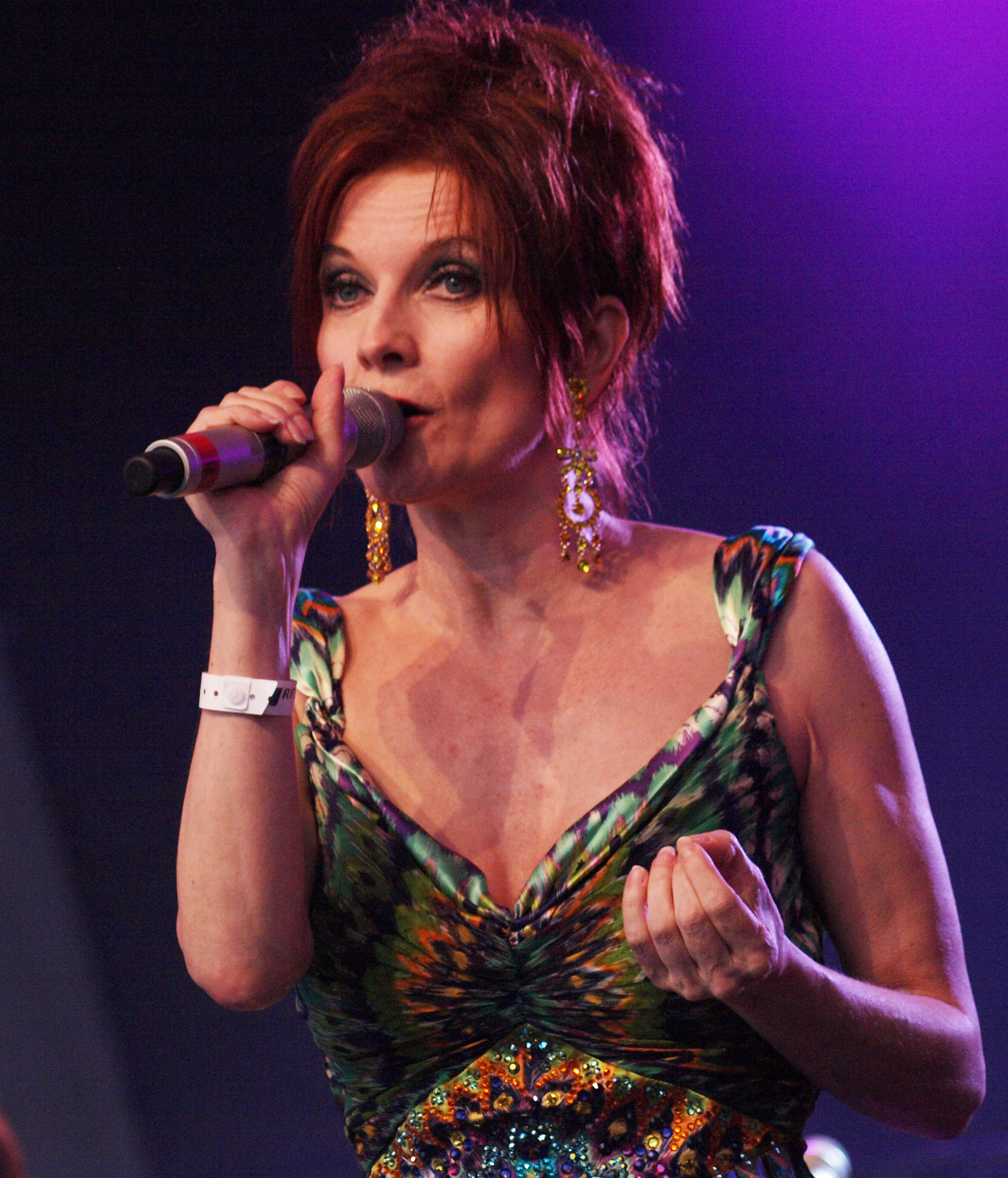
- Anne-Lie Rydé at Stockholm Pride 2010.

Background information
- Born: Anne-Lie Maria Rydé; 17 October 1956 (age 69)
- Origin: Lidingö, Sweden
- Genres: Pop, Rock, Schlager, Dansband music
- Instrument: Singing
- Years active: 1978—Present
- Website: Official Website

Anne-Lie Rydé (born 17 October 1956 in Stockholm) is a Swedish pop and rock singer.

== Early life and Music career ==
Rydé grew up on Lidingö, but moved to Gothenburg in 1976. There she played with the Gothenburg-based band Extra from 1978 to 1983. She moved back to Stockholm in 1983 and broke through as a solo artist that year with the eponymous album "Anne-Lie Rydé." Her first hit was "Segla på ett moln" (Sail On a Cloud), written by Per Gessle.

Anne-Lie Rydé was visually inspired by Punk and Nina Hagen, but musically she played rock. She wrote a number of songs herself. She toured in 1983–84 with Dan Hylander, Py Bäckman and the Raj Montana Band, and in 1985 received a Rockbjörnen and a Karamelodiktstipendiet, a scholarship awarded for innovation in music in Swedish. She had serious problems with her vocal cords in 1987 and almost had to stop singing, but managed to recover with "Mellan ljus och mörker" in 1989. The 1990s were a turning point in Rydé's career; she began singing pop music instead of rock. In 1992 the album "Stulna kyssar" became Rydé's biggest success to date and in 1993 was followed by a show of the same name.

She participated in Melodifestivalen in 2004, with "Säg att du har ångrat dig", 2005, with "Så nära", and 2007, with "Första gången", a duet with Svante Thuresson, failing to reach the final on all three occasions.

== Discography ==
=== Singles ===
Title	Year	Peak chart positions	Album
Title	Year	SWE	Album
"Säg att du har ångrat dig"	2004	52	Non-album single
"I hela mitt liv"	2007	9	I hela mitt liv
