= The Last Tycoon (disambiguation) =

The Last Tycoon is a 1941 unfinished novel by F. Scott Fitzgerald.

The Last Tycoon may also refer to:

- The Last Tycoon (1976 film), an American film based on the Fitzgerald novel
- The Last Tycoon (2012 film), a Hong Kong action-crime film
- The Last Tycoon (album), a 2008 album by Peter Morén
- The Last Tycoon (TV series), a 2016 American series based on the Fitzgerald novel
- The Last Tycoon (Playhouse 90), an episode of the American television series Playhouse 90
- Last Tycoon (1983–2006), an Irish-bred Thoroughbred racehorse

== See also ==
- The Last Tycoons, a 2007 book by William D. Cohan about investment bank Lazard
