= En midsommarnattsdröm (song) =

2005 single by Håkan Hellström

Single by Håkan Hellström

from the album Ett kolikbarns bekännelser
- B-side: "Min Huckleberry vän"
- Released: 14 January 2005
- Genre: Indie pop
- Length: 3:48
- Label: Warner Music Sweden, Woah Dad!
- Songwriter(s): Håkan Hellström
- Producer(s): Håkan Hellström, Bjorn Olsson

Håkan Hellström singles chronology
"Den fulaste flickan i världen" (2003)	"En midsommarnattsdröm" (2005)	"Dom kommer kliva på dig igen" (2005)

"En midsommarnattsdröm" is a song by Swedish singer-songwriter Håkan Hellström. It was released on 14 January 2005 as the lead single for his third album, Ett kolikbarns bekännelser. The track's b-sides, "En midsommarnattsdröm - Singbackversion med Theodor och Daniel" and "Min Huckleberry vän", were not included on the album. The title translates to "A midsummer night's dream".

== Track listing ==
All lyrics are written by Håkan Hellström and Bjorn Olsson

No.	Title	Music	Length
1.	"En midsommarnattsdröm" (A midsummer night's dream)	Håkan Hellström, Bjorn Olsson	3:48
2.	"En midsommarnattsdröm - Singbackversion med Theodor och Daniel" (A midsummer night's dream - Singback version with Theodor and Daniel)	Hellström, Olsson	4:11
3.	"Min Huckleberry vän" (My Huckleberry friend)	Hellström, Olsson	3:54

== Charts ==
Chart (2005)	Peak position
Sweden (Sverigetopplistan)	1
