= Ett kolikbarns bekännelser =

Studio album by Håkan Hellström
- Released: 2005
- Length: 59:46

Håkan Hellström chronology
Det är så jag säger det (2002)	Ett kolikbarns bekännelser (2005)	Nåt gammalt, nåt nytt, nåt lånat, nåt blått (2005)

Ett kolikbarns bekännelser is the third studio album by Håkan Hellström, released in 2005. The title would be translated as "Confessions of a Colic Child". Musically, the album is quite different from earlier Hellström records. The music is more folk oriented and the lyric topics are more mature, for example "Hurricane Gilbert" is about Hellström's long-time friend and guitarist Daniel Gilbert and "Jag har varit i alla städer" deals with success and its backside, in form of people trying to take advantage of Hellström.

== Track listing ==
1. "Jag har varit i alla städer" I've been to every city
2. "Brännö serenad" Brännö serenade
3. "En midsommarnattsdröm" A midsummer night's dream
4. "Dom kommer kliva på dig igen" They will step on you again
5. "Bara dårar rusar in" Only fools rush in
6. "Hurricane Gilbert"
7. "Gårdakvarnar och skit" Gårda mills and dirt
8. "Magasingatan" Magasingatan street
9. "Vaggvisa för flyktbenägna" Lullaby for escapees

== Charts ==
=== Weekly charts ===
Chart (2005)	Peak position
Norwegian Albums (VG-lista)	9
Swedish Albums (Sverigetopplistan)	2

=== Year-end charts ===
Chart (2005)	Position
Swedish Albums (Sverigetopplistan)	35
Chart (2014)	Position
Swedish Albums (Sverigetopplistan)	64
Chart (2015)	Position
Swedish Albums (Sverigetopplistan)	70
Chart (2016)	Position
Swedish Albums (Sverigetopplistan)	69
Chart (2017)	Position
Swedish Albums (Sverigetopplistan)	94
