= Det kommer aldrig va över för mig =

Studio album by Håkan Hellström
- Released: 17 April 2013
- Genre: Indie pop
- Label: Universal / Stranded
- Producer: Håkan Hellström, Johan Forsman, Björn Olsson, Måns Lundberg

Håkan Hellström chronology
2 steg från Paradise (2010)	Det kommer aldrig va över för mig (2013)	Håkan boma ye! (2014)

Det kommer aldrig va över för mig ("It'll never be over for me") is the seventh studio album by Swedish singer-songwriter Håkan Hellström, released on 17 April 2013. The album was recorded, written and produced in collaboration with Björn Olsson, Johan Forsman and Måns Lundberg. The album peaked at number one on the Swedish Albums Chart.

== Track listing ==
No.	Title	Writer(s)	Length
1.	"Peace N Luv"	Håkan Hellström, Björn Olsson	0:28
2.	"Det kommer aldrig va över för mig" (It will never be over for me)	Hellström, Olsson	4:27
3.	"Du kan gå din egen väg" (You can go your own way)	Hellström, Olsson	3:59
4.	"När lyktorna tänds" (When the lanterns light up)	Hellström, Olsson	4:47
5.	"Pistol" (Gun)	Hellström, Johan Forsman-Löwenström	4:36
6.	"Valborg" (Walpurgis)	Hellström, Olsson	3:18
7.	"Tänd strålkastarna" (Light the headlights)	Hellström, Olsson	0:52
8.	"Livets teater" (The theatre of life)	Hellström, Olsson, Forsman-Löwenström	3:06
9.	"Fri till slut" (Free at last)	Hellström	5:07
10.	"Street Hustle"	Hellström, Olsson	4:29
11.	"Det tog så lång tid att bli ung" (It took such a long time to get young)	Hellström, Olsson	5:23

== Charts ==
=== Weekly charts ===
Chart (2013)	Peak position
Sweden (Sverigetopplistan)	1

=== Year-end charts ===
Chart	Year	Position
Swedish Albums (Sverigetopplistan)	2013	6
Swedish Albums (Sverigetopplistan)	2014	7
Swedish Albums (Sverigetopplistan)	2015	16
Swedish Albums (Sverigetopplistan)	2016	17
Swedish Albums (Sverigetopplistan)	2017	18
Swedish Albums (Sverigetopplistan)	2018	38
Swedish Albums (Sverigetopplistan)	2021	52
Swedish Albums (Sverigetopplistan)	2022	32
Swedish Albums (Sverigetopplistan)	2023	21
Swedish Albums (Sverigetopplistan)	2024	31
Swedish Albums (Sverigetopplistan)	2025	27
