= I spåren av tåren =

I Spåren Av Tåren

Studio album by Peter Morén
- Released: 3 March 2010
- Recorded: Esther Studios (May–June and September–October 2009)
- Genre: Indie rock
- Length: 37.2 Minutes
- Label: Morén Pop
- Producer: Tobias Fröberg

Peter Morén chronology
The Last Tycoon (2008)	I Spåren Av Tåren (2010)	Pyramiden (2012)

Singles from I Spåren Av Tåren
- 1. "Esther" Released: 4 January 2010

I Spåren Av Tåren ('In The Tracks Of My Tears') is the second solo album by Swedish musician Peter Morén of the band Peter Bjorn And John, and his first in Swedish. This decision was made by Morén to enable him to include more precise cultural references and more freedom in his choice of lyrics. It was released in March 2010, having been recorded Summer and Autumn 2009. The album spawned one single, 'Esther', which was released in January 2010, preceding the album by two months and accompanied by a video. The Spotify version includes a 10-minute interview with Morén, who as well as singing plays many of the instruments on the album. While Morén's first album The Last Tycoon focused more on folk and folk-rock, I Spåren Av Tåren has a more classic rock and soul influenced style.

The song 'Att Komma Ikapp' was later translated into English for Morén's 'Broken Swenglish Vol. 1' EP as 'To Catch Up With You'. 'Esther' and the title track (renamed 'Hit Where It Hurts') were translated for the second EP in the series.

== Track listing ==
1. "Ett Land Som Inte Är" – 4:02
2. "I Spåren Av Tåren" – 3:58
3. "Babel" – 3:16
4. "Esther" – 3:07
5. "Så Synd" – 2:36 (So Sad (To Watch Good Love Go Bad)) (The Everly Brothers Cover)
6. "Dan Andersson-Land" – 5:07
7. "Stadshotell" – 4:20
8. "Oh, Jag Älskar Dig! ('Smokey' Robinson Cover)" – 4:07
9. "Den Vilda Andens Sång" – 4:09
10. "Att Komma Ikapp" – 2:38
11. "Kort Möte" (iTunes bonus track) – 2:47
12. "I Spåren Av Tåren (Demo Version)" (iTunes bonus track) – 3:55

== Personnel ==
- Peter Morén – Vocals, backing vocals, guitars, bass, piano, additional percussion
- Tobias Fröberg – Keyboards, backing vocals, additional percussion (also producer & recording personnel)
- Lars Skoglund – Drums, additional percussion

Additional musicians

- Tomas Hallonsten – Trumpet on "Ett Land Som Inte Är", "Stadshotell" & "Att Komma Ikapp"
- Erik Arvinder – Violins on "Esther" & "Oh, Jag Älskar Dig!"
- Markus Ståhl – Vibraphone on "Oh, Jag Älskar Dig!"
- Markus Krunegård – Backing vocals on "I Spåren Av Tåren" & "Stadshotell"
- Adam Olenius – Backing vocals on "I Spåren Av Tåren" & "Stadshotell"
