= Lilla fågel blå =

Single by Staffan Hellstrand

from the album Regn
- A-side: "Lilla fågel blå"
- B-side: "Månens barn"
- Released: 1993
- Genre: Swedish pop; rock
- Label: EMI
- Songwriter: Staffan Hellstrand

"Lilla fågel blå" ("Little Blue Bird") is a song written and recorded by Swedish musician Staffan Hellstrand for his fourth album, Regn (1993).

Hellström said the song was created when he tried to develop the musical ideas from the song "Hela himlen svart" from his previous album, Eld (1992). Song lyrics are about a youth friend of him who suffered from schizophrenia, but the opening words "Det kallas himlen ..." ("It's called heaven ...") has led to people believing the song is dedicated to a deceased person.

For the song, Hellstrand was given a Grammis award for "Song of the year 1993" and the song also won a Rockbjörnen award in the "Swedish song of the year 1993" category.

The single peaked at eight position at the Swedish singles chart. At Dansbandskampen 2009, the song was performed by the Highlights.

== Charts ==
Chart (1993)	Peak position
Europe (Eurochart Hot 100)	92
Sweden (Sverigetopplistan)	8
