= Håkan boma ye! =

Live album by Håkan Hellström
- Released: 5 December 2014
- Recorded: Ullevi, Gothenburg, Sweden, 7 June 2014
- Genre: pop
- Label: Kamikaze

Håkan Hellström chronology
Det kommer aldrig va över för mig (2013)	Håkan boma ye! (2014)

Håkan boma ye! was released on 5 December 2014, and is a Håkan Hellström live album. It was recorded during his concert at Ullevi in Gothenburg in Sweden on 7 June 2014, and was subsequently released as CD and LP.

== Track listing ==
=== CD ===
==== CD 1 ====
1. Tro och tvivel
2. En vän med en bil
3. Du kan gå din egen väg
4. Nu kan du få mig så lätt
5. Man måste dö några gånger innan man kan leva
6. Zigenarliv dreamin'
7. Vid protesfabrikens stängsel
8. Jag har varit i alla städer
9. Gårdakvarnar och skit
10. Dom där jag kommer från/Ju mer dom spottar
11. Kom igen Lena
12. Brännö serenad
13. När lyktorna tänds

==== CD 2 ====
1. Shelley
2. Klubbland
3. Pistol
4. För sent för edelweiss
5. Jag vet inte vem jag är men jag vet att jag är din
6. Mitt gullbergs kaj paradis
7. Kärlek är ett brev skickat tusen gånger
8. Hela huset
9. En midsommarnattsdröm
10. Ramlar
11. Det är så jag säger det

==== CD 3 ====
1. Valborg
2. Känn ingen sorg för mig Göteborg
3. Det kommer aldrig va över för mig
4. Du är snart där
5. Bara dårar rusar in

=== LP ===
==== 1A ====
1. Tro och tvivel
2. En vän med en bil
3. Du kan gå din egen väg
4. Nu kan du få mig så lätt

==== 1B ====
1. Man måste dö några gånger innan man kan leva
2. Zigenarliv dreamin'
3. Vid protesfabrikens stängsel
4. Jag har varit i alla städer

==== 2A ====
1. Gårdakvarnar och skit
2. Dom där jag kommer från/Ju mer dom spottar
3. Kom igen Lena

==== 2B ====
1. Brännö serenad
2. När lyktorna tänds
3. Shelley
4. Klubbland
5. Pistol

==== 3A ====
1. För sent för edelweiss
2. Jag vet inte vem jag är men jag vet att jag är din
3. Mitt Gullbergs kaj paradis
4. Kärlek är ett brev skickat tusen gånger

==== 3B ====
1. Hela huset
2. En midsommarnattsdröm
3. Ramlar

==== 4A ====
1. Det är så jag säger det
2. Valborg
3. Känn ingen sorg för mig Göteborg

==== 4B ====
1. Det kommer aldrig va över för mig
2. Du är snart där
3. Bara dårar rusar in

== Charts ==
=== Weekly charts ===
Chart (2014–15)	Peak position
Swedish Albums (Sverigetopplistan)	1

=== Year-end charts ===
Chart (2014)	Position
Swedish Albums (Sverigetopplistan)	45
Chart (2015)	Position
Swedish Albums (Sverigetopplistan)	69
Chart (2016)	Position
Swedish Albums (Sverigetopplistan)	94
