= Pyramiden (album) =

Studio album by Peter Morén
- Released: 19 September 2012 (Sweden); 25 September 2012 (International)
- Genre: Indie rock, new wave
- Length: 44.3 Minutes
- Label: INGRID
- Producer: Tobias Fröberg

Peter Morén chronology
I Spåren Av Tåren (2010)	Pyramiden (2012)

Singles from Pyramiden
- 1. "Odyssén (w/ b-side Vinstintressen)" Released: 14 June 2012; 2. "Säg Mitt Namn (Say My Name)" Released: 14 August 2012; 3. "Tröstpriset" Released: Autumn 2012

Pyramiden is the third solo album by Swedish musician Peter Morén of the band Peter Bjorn And John, and his second in Swedish. So far, two singles have been released, both digital only. The album is named after the Russian ghost town of Pyramiden, which also partly inspired the album. While Morén's second album I Spåren Av Tåren focused more on soul and classic baroque-pop influences, Pyramiden has a more new wave and modern indie rock style, interlaced with acoustic influences. The album is notably more political than Moren's previous work, with the title having a double meaning in the form of career pyramids and pyramid schemes, and the idea of the pyramid as a type of grave.

An English-language version of "Säg Mitt Namn" was released on the Volym 1 compilation album by INGRID and is included in the Broken Swenglish Vol. 1 EP released by Morén in late 2013, along with 'Constant Reaction' ('Orsak Och Verkan') and an English-language rewrite of 'Erik M. Nilsson' entitled 'Going Places'. The second EP in the series included translations of the title track, 'Odyssén' (as 'The Odyssey'), and 'Capri, Cannes & Brighton'.

== Track listing ==
1. "Erik M. Nilsson" – 3:55
2. "Odyssén" – 3:33
3. "Budbäraren" – 3:26
4. "Capri, Cannes & Brighton" – 4:30
5. "Tröstpriset" – 3:30
6. "Säg Mitt Namn" – 3:16
7. "Opportunistens Klagan" – 4:21
8. "Orsak Och Verkan" – 2:36
9. "Var Den Du Är" – 3:36
10. "Innan Jag Landar" – 4:37
11. "Pyramiden" – 4:33
12. "Älskar Hur Du Älskar (I Love How You Love) (Paris Sisters Cover)" (Bonus track) – 2:24
