= Nåt gammalt, nåt nytt, nåt lånat, nåt blått =

Studio album by Håkan Hellström
- Released: 28 December 2005
- Length: 55:09

Håkan Hellström chronology
| Ett kolikbarns bekännelser (2005) | Nåt gammalt, nåt nytt, nåt lånat, nåt blått (2005) | Försent för Edelweiss (2008) |

Nåt gammalt, nåt nytt, nåt lånat, nåt blått is the fourth studio album by Håkan Hellström, released on 28 December 2005. In English the title corresponds to "Something old, something new, something borrowed, something blue." The title describes the nature of the album—some songs are leftovers from earlier recordings, some are newly written ones and a few others are covers. For example, "Jag vill ha allting" is a cover of Luna's "I Want Everything", while "13" is a version of the Big Star song "Thirteen".

== Track listing ==
1. "13"
2. "Klubbland" Clubland
3. "Så länge du är med mig" As Long As You Are with Me)
4. "Jag vill ha allting" I Want It All
5. "Precis som Romeo" Just Like Romeo
6. "Augusti i helvetet" August in Hell
7. "Jag hatar att jag älskar dig och jag älskar dig så mycket att jag hatar mig" I Hate That I Love You and I Love You So Much That I Hate Myself
8. "Evert Taube"
9. "Fade Away"
10. "Går vidare" Moving On
11. "Gatan Fram" The Street Forward
12. "Fairytale of New York"

== Charts ==
=== Weekly charts ===
| Chart (2006) | Peak position |
|---|---|
| Sweden (Sverigetopplistan) | 1 |

=== Year-end charts ===
| Chart (2006) | Position |
|---|---|
| Sweden (Sverigetopplistan) | 36 |
