= The Last Tycoon (album) =

Studio album by Peter Morén
- Released: 8 April 2008
- Recorded: Stockholm (December 2005 – June 2007)
- Genre: Indie rock
- Length: 41.1 Minutes
- Label: Wichita Recordings; Quarterstick Records
- Producer: Tobias Fröberg / Daniel Värjö

Peter Morén chronology
The Last Tycoon (2008)	I Spåren Av Tåren (2010)

Singles from The Last Tycoon
- 1. "Social Competence" Released: 11 March 2008; 2. "Reel Too Real" Released: 21 April 2008

The Last Tycoon is the debut solo album by Swedish musician Peter Morén of the band Peter Bjorn And John. The album revolves mainly around the theme of adolescence (the track "This Is What I Came For" is especially autobiographical), though its title is taken from the unfinished The Last Tycoon by F. Scott Fitzgerald. Morén's initial plan was to make a purely acoustic record, but the final product contains elements such as string sections and synthesisers. It was released by V2 Records under license from Wichita Recordings. The album was recorded "...in our spare, stolen hours, here and there in apartments, rehearsal spaces and studios in Stockholm...". The album had two singles; Social Competence, released in March, followed by Reel Too Real in April. The album was produced by songwriter Tobias Fröberg, and Daniel Värjö, member of The Concretes, whose former member Victoria Bergsman Morén had previously collaborated with on the Peter Bjorn And John song "Young Folks".

Professional ratings
Review scores
Source	Rating
AllMusic	4/5 stars
The A.V. Club	B–
DIY	3/5 stars
Pitchfork	5.4/10
PopMatters	4/10
Spin	3/5 stars

== Track listing ==
1. "Reel Too Real" – 3:13
2. "Missing Link" – 2:53
3. "Old Love" – 3:02
4. "Le Petit Coeur" – 4:08
5. "Tell Me In Time" – 4:39
6. "My Match" – 3:28
7. "This Is What I Came For" – 6:30
8. "Twisted" – 4:13
9. "Social Competence" – 4:23
10. "I Don't Gaze At The Sky For Long" – 4:33

== Personnel ==
- Peter Morén – Vocals, backing vocals, electric guitar, acoustic guitar, bass, piano, keyboards, tubular bells, harmonica, zither, drums on "My Match", additional percussion

Additional musicians

- Tobias Fröberg – Drums, piano, additional percussion
- Leo Svensson – String arrangements, cello on "Missing Link" & "Le Petit Coeur"
- Lisa Rydberg – Violin on "Missing Link" & "Le Petit Coeur"
- Anne Pajonen – Violia on "Missing Link" & "Le Petit Coeur"
- Mattias Areskog – Bass and piano duet partner on "Le Petit Coeur", double-bass on "Tell Me In Time"
- Nicklas Korsell – Drums on "Le Petit Coeur", "Tell Me In Time" & "Social Competence"
- Markus Ståhl – Vibraphone on "Tell Me In Time"
- Daniel Värjö – Bells on "My Match" (also producer), additional percussion on "Social Competence"
