= För sent för Edelweiss =

För sent för edelweiss

Studio album by Håkan Hellström
- Released: 26 March 2008
- Recorded: 2006–2008
- Genre: Pop, rock, pop soul
- Length: 55:19
- Label: EMI
- Producer: Håkan Hellström, Joakim Åhlund

Håkan Hellström chronology
| Nåt gammalt, nåt nytt, nåt lånat, nåt blått (2005) | För sent för edelweiss (2008) | 2 steg från Paradise (2010) |

Professional ratings
Review scores
| Source | Rating |
|---|---|
| AllMusic | 3/5 stars |

För sent för edelweiss is the fifth studio album by Swedish singer Håkan Hellström, released on 26 March 2008. It was produced by Håkan Hellström with Joakim Åhlund. Three singles were released from the album: "För en lång lång tid", "Jag vet inte vem jag är men jag vet att jag är din" and "Kär i en ängel".

== Track listing ==
1. "Tro och tvivel" Faith And Doubt
2. "För en lång lång tid" For A Long Long Time
3. "Zigenarliv Dreamin" Gypsy Life Dreamin'
4. "Kärlek är ett brev skickat tusen gånger" Love Is A Letter Sent A Thousand Times
5. "Jag vet inte vem jag är men jag vet att jag är din" I Don't Know Who I Am But I Know I'm Yours
6. "För sent för edelweiss" Too Late For Edelweiss
7. "Kär i en ängel" In Love With An Angel
8. "Sång i en buss på villovägar 2007" Song Inside A Bus Gone Astray 2007
9. "Dom fyra årstiderna" The Four Seasons
10. "Långa vägar" Long Roads
11. "Flyg du lilla fjäril" Fly Little Butterfly
12. "Inte skyldig nån nåt" Not Owing Anyone Anything

== Charts ==
=== Weekly charts ===
| Chart (2008) | Peak position | Certification |
|---|---|---|
| Norway (VG-lista) | 19 | |
| Sweden (Sverigetopplistan) | 1 | GLF: Gold |

=== Year-end charts ===
| Chart (2008) | Position |
|---|---|
| Swedish Albums (Sverigetopplistan) | 10 |
