= 500 dagar om året =

Studio album by Tomas Ledin
- Released: 10 June 2009
- Recorded: Winter 2008/2009
- Genre: Pop
- Length: 45:05
- Label: Universal Music, (060252702033)
- Producer: Lasse Andersson

Tomas Ledin chronology
Plektrum (2006)	500 dagar om året (2009)	Tolkingarna (2011)

Singles from 500 dagar om året
- 1. "Håll ut" Released: 2 February 2009; 2. "500 dagar om året" Released: 15 May 2009

500 dagar om året (500 days a year) is the 20th studio album by Swedish singer-songwriter Tomas Ledin, released in June 2009.

== Album information ==
The album produced by Lasse Andersson, was recorded during the winter of 2008/2009 in Sweden. As usual, all songs were composed by Ledin himself, with some help by Lasse Andersson on the track "Håll ut". The song was eventually released as the first single from the album, peaking at number 42 on the Swedish Singles Chart in February 2009. The title track itself was also released on single before the actual album and became the album's biggest hit. In addition to peaking at number 16 on the official sales chart, it also became Tomas' first top5 hit on the Swedish radio chart Svensktoppen, since 1993.

The album itself was a huge success. Upon its release in June 2009, it entered the Swedish albums chart at number two and stayed in the top10 for eleven weeks. "500 dagar om året" was certified Platinum a month after its release, in early July.

In 2010, another track from the album managed to enter the Svensktoppen charts. In April, the album's closing number, "Kanske kvällens sista dans", peaked at number 10.

== Track listing ==
500 dagar om året
No.	Title	Writer(s)	Title (English translation)	Length
1.	"500 dagar om året"	Tomas Ledin	500 days a year	4:23
2.	"Att inte göra någonting alls"	Tomas Ledin	Doing nothing at all	2:55
3.	"Medelklassens okrönta kungar"	Tomas Ledin	Uncrowned kings of the middle class	4:03
4.	"Alldeles för lätt"	Tomas Ledin	Just too easy	4:28
5.	"Din vän i alla fall"	Tomas Ledin	Your friend in any case	4:46
6.	"Dyningar"	Tomas Ledin	Swells	0:43
7.	"Atlantkustens kyliga smekning"	Tomas Ledin	Atlantic coast's cool caress	6:39
8.	"Vår egen sång"	Tomas Ledin	Our own song	4:22
9.	"Ut på vägarna igen"	Tomas Ledin	Out on the road again	3:56
10.	"Håll ut"	Tomas Ledin, Lasse Andersson	Persevere	4:06
11.	"Kanske kvällens sista dans"	Tomas Ledin	Maybe the last dance of the evening	4:38
Total length:				45:05

== Personnel ==
The following musicians contributed to the recording of "500 dagar om året":

- Tomas Ledin: vocals, background vocals, acoustic guitar, high string guitar, harmonica
- Lasse Andersson: electric guitar, piano, background vocals, percussion, acoustic guitar, drums
- Sebastian Nylund: electric guitar
- Jörgen Ingeström: hammond organ, piano
- Ove Andersson: bass
- Mikael Lyander: tambourine, percussion
- Johan Franzon: drums
