= Vi är på gång =

Song by Tomas Ledin
- Language: Swedish
- A-side: "Det finns inget finare än kärleken"
- Released: May 1983
- Genre: Pop
- Label: Polar
- Songwriter: Tomas Ledin

"Vi är på gång" is a song written by Tomas Ledin, originally appearing as a B-side for the single "Det finns inget finare än kärleken", released in May 1983. The song later became common at sporting events in Sweden.

A later version, Vi är på gång - VM 2006, was appointed fight song of Team Sweden for the 2006 FIFA World Cup in Germany.

Tomas Ledin has also recorded the song in English, as "We're on the Beat".

== 2006 single ==
Released on 17 May 2006, and produced by Jörgen Ingeström and Bo Reimer, the 2006 single version peaked at 5th position at the Swedish singles chart. The song received a Svensktoppen test on 11 June 2006, but failed to enter chart.

=== Single ===
1. "Vi är på gång - VM 2006" – 3:10
2. "Vi är på gång - VM 2006" (arena version) – 3:45

== Chart positions ==
Year (2006)	Peak position
Sweden	5
