= Carlforsska gymnasiet =

Swedish secondary school in Västerås

Coordinates: 59°37′17″N 16°32′21″E

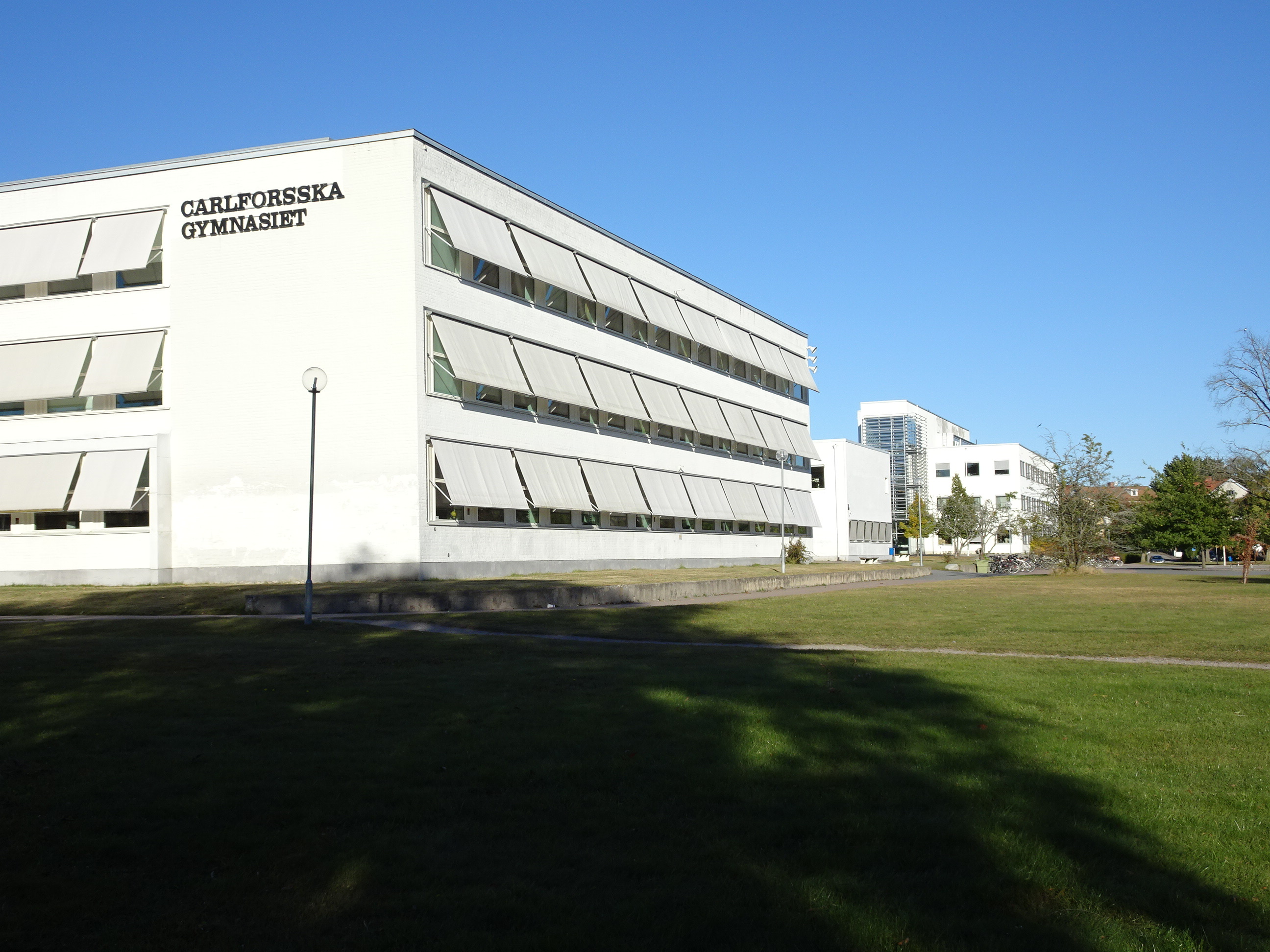
Carlforsska gymnasiet in Västerås, Sweden.

Carlforsska gymnasiet, in short: Carlforsska, is a Swedish secondary school in Västerås, Sweden. The school offers regular Swedish programs in arts, social sciences, and healthcare. The school also offers the International Baccalaureate Diploma Program and programs for the upper secondary special school catering to students with disabilities.
