= Med vidöppna fönster =

Studio album by Tomas Ledin
- Released: 2 March 2004
- Recorded: 2003, 2004
- Genre: Pop
- Length: 56:39
- Labels: Anderson Records, Universal Music, (981 757-1)
- Producers: Lasse Andersson; Dan Hylander; Tomas Ledin

Tomas Ledin chronology
I sommarnattens ljus (2003)	Med vidöppna fönster (2004)	Plektrum (2006)

Med vidöppna fönster (With wide open windows) is the 18th studio album by Swedish singer/songwriter Tomas Ledin, released in March 2004.

== Track listing ==
Adapted from Spotify and Tidal.

Med vidöppna fönster track listing
No.	Title	Writer(s)	Title (English translation)	Length
1.	"Bara Miles blåa toner hänger kvar"	Tomas Ledin, Dan Hylander	Only Miles blue tones linger on	4:33
2.	"Vem kunde ana"	Tomas Ledin, Dan Hylander	Who could have guessed	3:37
3.	"(Vad gör du med mig) Louise"	Tomas Ledin, Dan Hylander	(What do you do with me) Louise	3:57
4.	"Kärlekens anletsdrag"	Tomas Ledin	Love's features	5:29
5.	"Ett fruset ögonblick"	Tomas Ledin, Dan Hylander	A frozen moment	3:59
6.	"En för att sova"	Tomas Ledin, Dan Hylander	One for sleeping	4:22
7.	"Det finns nätter"	Tomas Ledin, Dan Hylander	There are nights	5:27
8.	"När fullmånen slösar sitt silver"	Tomas Ledin	When the full-moon is losing its silver	6:05
9.	"Lyckligt berusad av dig"	Tomas Ledin, Dan Hylander	Happily drunken from you	4:22
10.	"Balladen om Ohlin"	Tomas Ledin, Dan Hylander	Ballad about Ohlin	5:32
11.	"Bröllopsvisa (För första gången)"	Tomas Ledin, Dan Hylander	Weddingsong (For the first time)	2:57
12.	"Stanna"	Tomas Ledin, Dan Hylander	Stay	6:15
Total length:				56:39
