= Håkan Hellström =

Swedish singer-songwriter

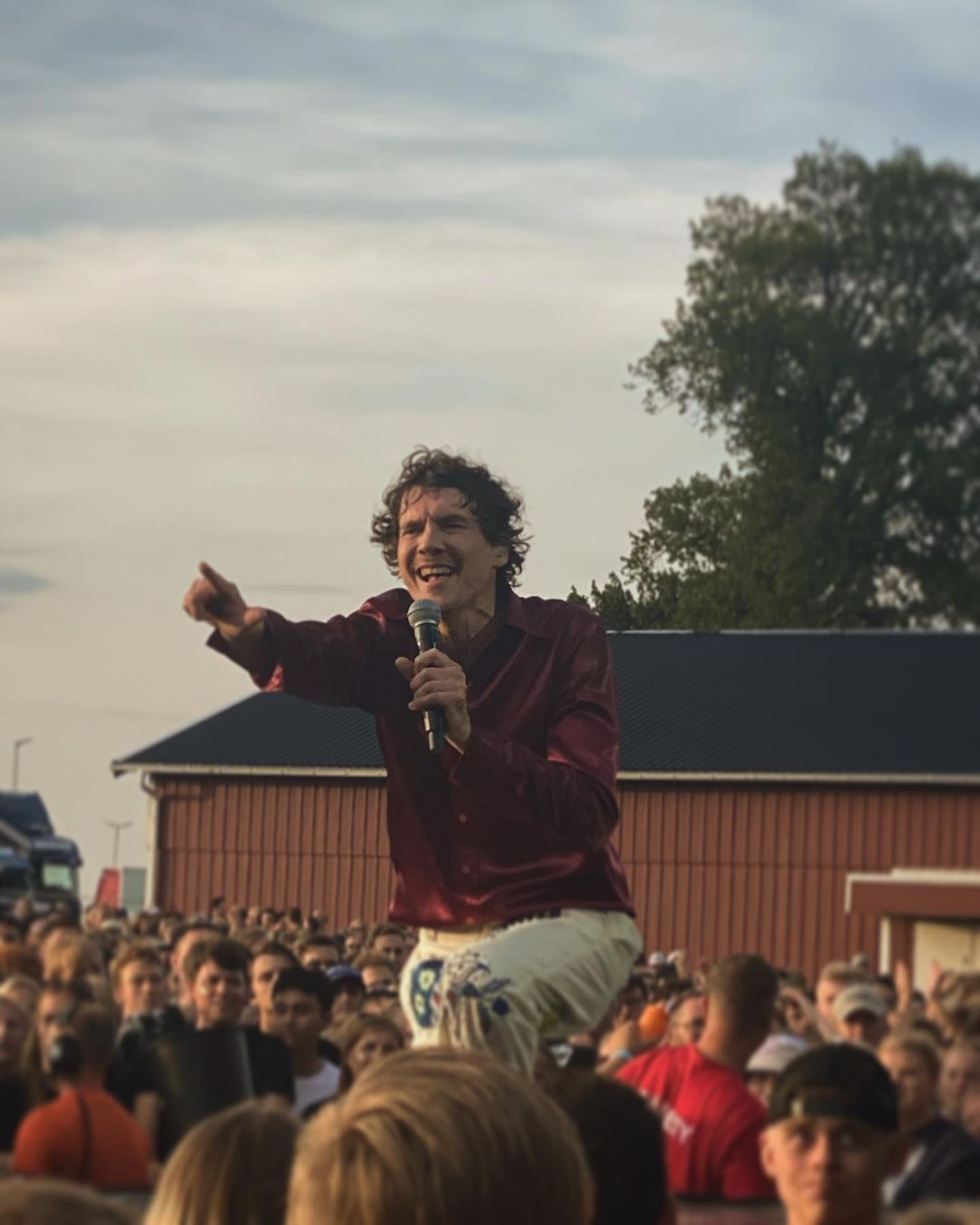
- Håkan Hellström in July 2023

Background information
- Born: 2 April 1974 (age 52); Gothenburg, Sweden
- Genres: Pop, jangle pop, soul, Indie pop
- Occupations: Singer; musician
- Instruments: Vocals, guitar
- Years active: 1991–present
- Label: Tro och tvivel
- Formerly of: Broder Daniel; Honey Is Cool
- Website: Official website

Håkan Georg Hellström (born 2 April 1974) is a Swedish singer and songwriter. He made his breakthrough in Sweden in 2000 with the song "Känn ingen sorg för mig Göteborg" and the album by the same name. He has released eleven studio albums to date with eight reaching number one on the Swedish Albums Chart.

Hellström is also known for complaints about his singing off key. Some music critics have defended him, calling his voice sensitive and strained, as well as unique and gripping.

== Career ==
Hellström played drums in the Swedish indie pop band Broder Daniel between 1988 and 1994, then briefly for Swedish alternative rock band Honey Is Cool with Karin Dreijer from The Knife and Fever Ray. In 1997, he rejoined Broder Daniel to play the bass, until 2003 when he left the band again to focus completely on his solo career.

In 2006, following the birth of his son, he announced that he would take a break from touring and recording. Despite this, he still performed occasional gigs and continues to release very successful albums.

On 5 June 2016, he performed a concert at Ullevi Stadium in Gothenburg that set a new attendance record of 70,144 people. In the summer of 2020, he was supposed to celebrate 20 years since his first album release, by having four concerts at Ullevi Stadium. All of the concerts were cancelled due to Covid but were instead held in August 2022. On 15 May 2020, Hellström released the album Rampljus Vol.1. The album peaked at number one on the Swedish Albums Chart, marking Hellström's ninth album to do so. Shortly after the release of Rampljus Vol.1, Hellström released the album Rampljus. The album contains the songs from the previous release and seven new songs.

== Discography ==
=== Albums ===
Studio albums

List of studio albums, with chart positions and certifications
Album	Year	Peak positions		Certifications
Album	Year	SWE	NOR	Certifications
Känn ingen sorg för mig Göteborg	2000	1	21	SWE: Platinum
Det är så jag säger det	2002	1	3	SWE: Platinum
Ett kolikbarns bekännelser	2005	2	9	SWE: Gold
Nåt gammalt, nåt nytt, nåt lånat, nåt blått	2006	1	—	SWE: Gold
För sent för Edelweiss	2008	1	19	SWE: Gold
2 steg från Paradise	2010	1	4	SWE: Platinum
Det kommer aldrig va över för mig	2013	1	2	SWE: 5× Platinum
Du gamla du fria	2016	1	9	SWE: Gold
Illusioner	2018	1	34	
Rampljus Vol. 1	2020	1	11	
Rampljus Vol. 2	2020	8	—	
Poetiska försök	2023	1	—	SWE: Gold
Svensk rost	2025	1	—	

Live albums

Album	Year	Peak positions
Album	Year	SWE
Två steg från Paradise – Tour Edition	2010	2
Way Out West 2010	2011	—
Håkan boma ye!	2014	1

Compilation albums

Album	Year	Peak positions
Album	Year	SWE
Samlade singlar 2000–2010	2010	4

=== Extended plays ===
- 2002: Luften bor i mina steg
- 2016: 1974
- 2025: Gå för glory

=== Singles ===
Title	Year	Peak positions	Certifications	Album
Title	Year	SWE	Certifications	Album
"Känn ingen sorg för mig Göteborg"	2000	29		Känn ingen sorg för mig Göteborg
"Ramlar"	2000	48		Känn ingen sorg för mig Göteborg
"En vän med en bil"	2001	27		Känn ingen sorg för mig Göteborg
"Nu kan du få mig så lätt"	2001	54		Känn ingen sorg för mig Göteborg
"Luften bor i mina steg"	2002	1		Det är så jag säger det
"Kom igen Lena!"	2002	2		Det är så jag säger det
"Den fulaste flickan i världen"	2003	22		Det är så jag säger det
"Mitt Gullbergs kaj paradis" / "Himmel blå himmel blå"	2003	6		Det är så jag säger det
"En midsommarnattsdröm"	2005	1		Ett kolikbarns bekännelser
"Dom kommer kliva på dig igen"	2005	24		Ett kolikbarns bekännelser
"Gårdakvarnar och skit"	2005	42		Ett kolikbarns bekännelser
"13"	2005	6		Nåt gammalt, nåt nytt, nåt lånat, nåt blått
"Jag hatar att jag älskar dig och jag älskar dig så mycket att jag hatar mig"	2006	8		Nåt gammalt, nåt nytt, nåt lånat, nåt blått
"Klubbland"	2006	33		Nåt gammalt, nåt nytt, nåt lånat, nåt blått
"För en lång lång tid"	2008	8		För sent för edelweiss
"Kär i en ängel"	2008	51		För sent för edelweiss
"Jag vet inte vem jag är men jag vet att jag är din"	2009	60		För sent för edelweiss
"River en vacker dröm"	2010	6		Två steg från Paradise
"Saknade te havs"	2010	7		Två steg från Paradise
"Det här är min tid, Pt. 2"	2010	57		Två steg från Paradise
"Det kommer aldrig va över för mig"	2013	2	SWE: 7× Platinum	Det kommer aldrig va över för mig
"Valborg"	2013	11		Det kommer aldrig va över för mig
"Pistol"	2013	18		Det kommer aldrig va över för mig
"Du kan gå din egen väg"	2013	22		Det kommer aldrig va över för mig
"När lyktorna tänds"	2013	26		Det kommer aldrig va över för mig
"Fri till slut"	2013	31		Det kommer aldrig va över för mig
"Livets teater"	2013	34		Det kommer aldrig va över för mig
"Tänd strålkastarna"	2013	36		Det kommer aldrig va över för mig
"Det tog så lång tid att bli ung"	2013	41		Det kommer aldrig va över för mig
"Street Hustle"	2013	43		Det kommer aldrig va över för mig
"Hela huset" (with Veronica Maggio)	2013	8		Handen i fickan fast jag bryr mig
"Din tid kommer"	2016	5		Du gamla du fria
"Hon är en runaway"	2016	19		Du gamla du fria
"I sprickorna kommer ljuset in"	2016	31		Du gamla du fria
"Du fria" (Nisj Remix) (with Silvana Imam)	2016	86		Non-album singles
"Vänta tills våren"	2018	17		Non-album singles
"Tillsammans i mörker"	2020	7		Rampljus
"Studentfylleflaken"	2020	42		Rampljus
"Kaos är min lady"	2020	68		Rampljus
"Känn ingen sorg för mig Göteborg" (with Aden x Asme)	2021	14		Non-album singles
"Jag vill bara va med dej" (featuring Noonie Bao)	2022	10		Non-album singles
"Den här gången är det på riktigt"	2023	21		Poetiska försök
"Jag är en wild story"	2023	53		Poetiska försök
"Saudade" (with Hov1)	2023	1		Non-album singles
"Som sommaren"	2024	65		Non-album singles
"Zoey" (with Josef Slunge)	2024	— (Note: "Zoey" did not enter the Swedish Singellista Chart, but peaked at number eight on the Swedish Heatseeker Chart.)		Non-album singles
"Gå för glory"	2025	47		Gå för glory
"Sweethearts"	2025	81		Svensk rost
"Svindlande höjder"	2025	46		Svensk rost
"Evergreen min vän evergreen"	2025	95		Svensk rost
"Eld fire fogo" (with Kapten Röd and Jaqee)	2026	84		Non-album singles
"Tequila" (with Otto Knows)	2026	82		Non-album singles
"Bakon oss bara dimma"	2026	56		Non-album singles

=== Other charted songs ===
Year	Single	Peak positions	Album
Year	Single	SWE	Album
2016	"Brinner in the Shit"	42	1974 EP
2016	"Lämna mig inte i det här skicket"	51	1974 EP
2016	"Parlor"	39	Du gamla du fria
2016	"Jag utan dig"	43	Du gamla du fria
2016	"Oppen genom hela natten"	47	Du gamla du fria
2016	"Runaway (Fri som en Byrd)"	51	Du gamla du fria
2016	"Ingen oro, tjabo!"	56	Du gamla du fria
2016	"Hoppas att det ska gå bra för de yngre också"	58	Du gamla du fria
2016	"Elefanten & sparven"	60	Du gamla du fria
2016	"Du gamla (That's Alright Since My Soul Got a Seat up in the Kingdom)"	61	Du gamla du fria
2016	"Du fria"	62	Du gamla du fria
2016	"#10 Dream"	67	Du gamla du fria
2018	"I dina armar"	38	Illusioner
2018	"Tro på livet"	42	Illusioner
2018	"Båda sidor nu"	57	Illusioner
2018	"Nordhemsgatan leder rakt in i himlen"	58	Illusioner
2018	"Mitt hjärta är ett jordskried"	65	Illusioner
2018	"Gott nytt"	74	Illusioner
2018	"Interlude: I dina armar"	87	Illusioner
2018	"I Love U Stupid"	92	Illusioner
2018	"Sjung Högre"	97	Illusioner
2020	"Alla drömmar är uppfyllda"	9	Rampljus Vol.1
2020	"Vägen med regnbågen över"	45	Rampljus Vol.1
2020	"Bit dig i läppen"	48	Rampljus Vol.1
2020	"Va inte född att följa efter"	55	Rampljus Vol.1
2020	"Snälla släck inte ljusen"	62	Rampljus Vol.1
2023	"HH vill bara va med dej"	— (Note: "HH vill bara va med dej" did not enter the Swedish Singellista Chart, but peaked at number two on the Swedish Heatseeker Chart.)	Poetiska försök
2023	"Små bäckar, stora floder"	— (Note: "Små bäckar, stora floder" did not enter the Swedish Singellista Chart, but peaked at number seven on the Swedish Heatseeker Chart.)	Poetiska försök
2023	"Symfonivisa"	— (Note: "Symfonivisa" did not enter the Swedish Singellista Chart, but peaked at number 14 on the Swedish Heatseeker Chart.)	Poetiska försök
2023	"Fan ta dig"	— (Note: "Fan ta dig" did not enter the Swedish Singellista Chart, but peaked at number 19 on the Swedish Heatseeker Chart.)	Poetiska försök
2025	"För sent för Edelweiss"	— (Note: "För sent för Edelweiss" did not enter the Swedish Singellista Chart, but peaked at number eight on the Swedish Heatseeker Chart.)	För sent för Edelweiss
2025	"Jag är 30 år efter min tid"	75	Svensk rost
2025	"Så sött livet kan smaka"	35	Svensk rost
2025	"Kristen"	— (Note: "Kristen" did not enter the Swedish Singellista Chart, but peaked at number three on the Swedish Heatseeker Chart.)	Svensk rost
2025	"Mötte en majorna blomma"	— (Note: "Mötte en majorna blomma" did not enter the Swedish Singellista Chart, but peaked at number one on the Swedish Heatseeker Chart.)	Svensk rost
2025	"Allt kommer vår väg"	— (Note: "Allt kommer vår väg" did not enter the Swedish Singellista Chart, but peaked at number 12 on the Swedish Heatseeker Chart.)	Svensk rost
