= Dan Hylander =

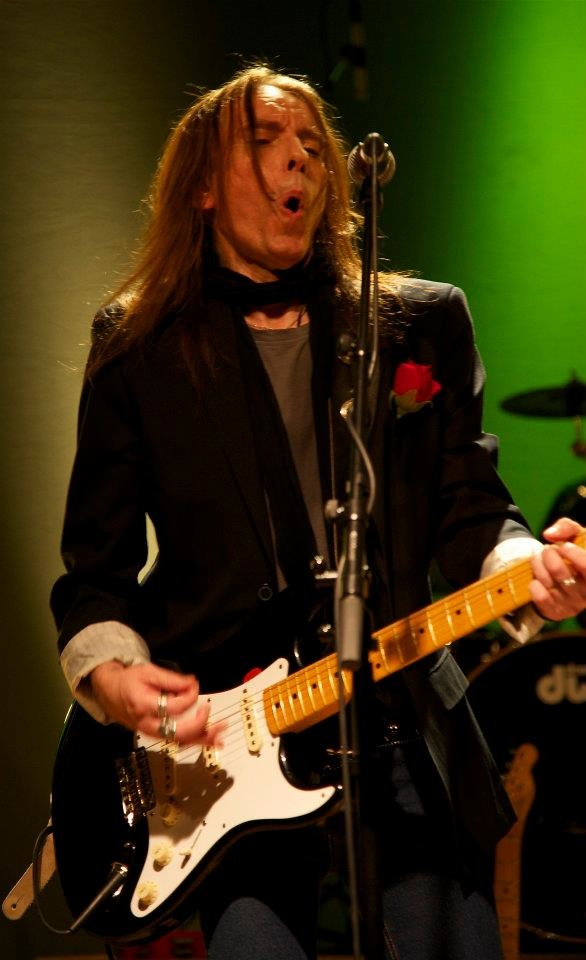
- Dan Hylander (2011)

Background information
- Born: 21 June 1954 (age 71); Malmö, Sweden
- Genres: Pop, rock
- Occupation: Singer

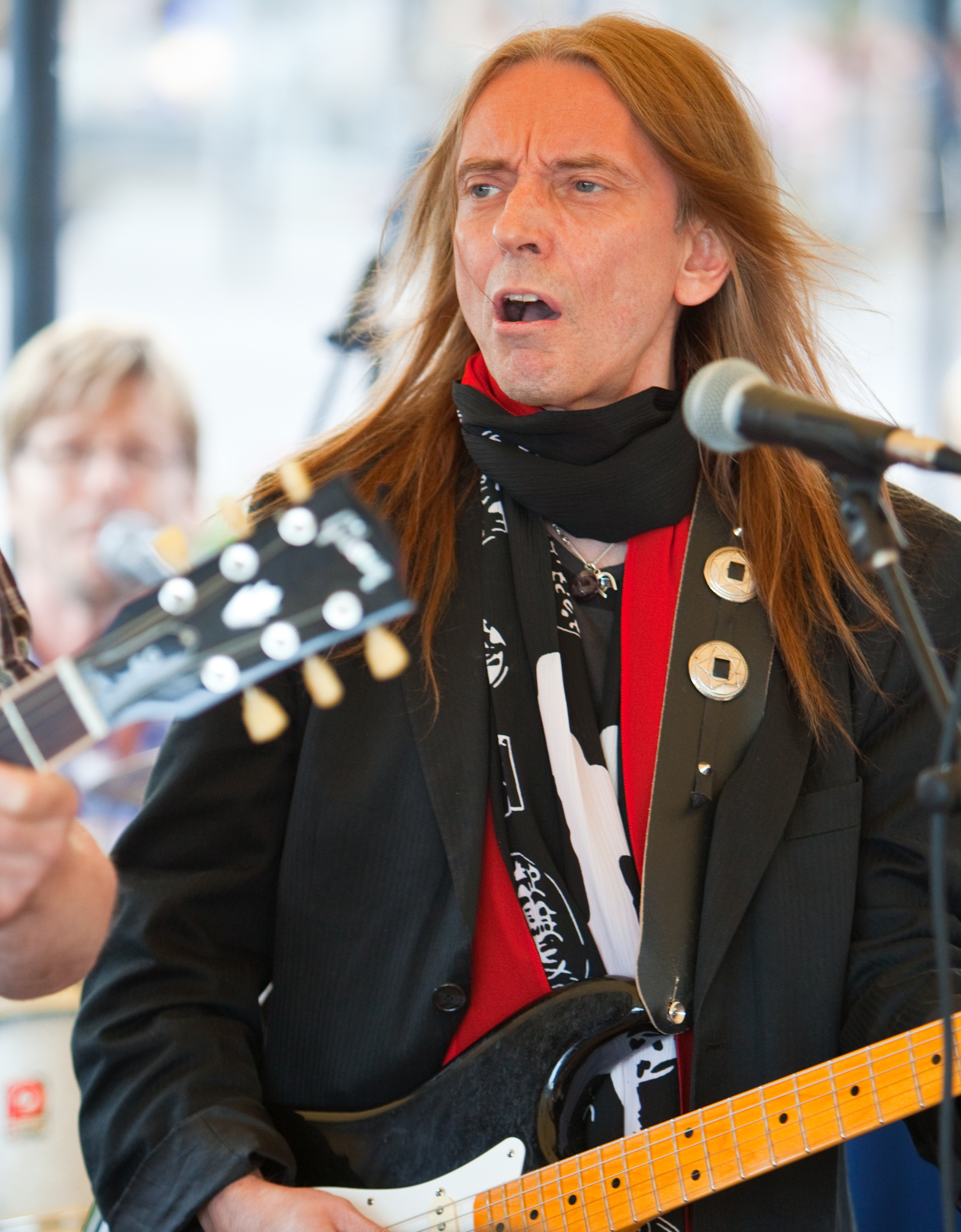
Dan Hylander (2012)

Dan Owe Michael Hylander known as Dan Hylander (born 21 June 1954 in Malmö, Sweden) is a Swedish songwriter, pop and rock singer and guitarist. He has collaborated prominently with Py Bäckman and the band Raj Montana Band, which served as a backing vocal group for both Bäckman and Hylander.

Hylander's commercial breakthrough came in the early 1980s as Dan Hylander & Raj Montana Band made up of Hylander with David Carlson (guitar), Ola Johansson (bass), Clarence Öfwerman (keyboard), Hasse Olsson (organ and keyboard), Pelle Alsing (drums). In 1984 Hylander won the "Rockbjörnen" award as the year's "Swedish male artist".

In the mid-1980s, Hylander made a solo career with a newly formed backing band Kosmonaut, although keeping occasional reunions with Raj Montana Band.

In 2004, he co-wrote with Swedish singer/songwriter Tomas Ledin all the songs on Ledin's album Med vidöppna fönster (meaning With wide open windows).

In 2007, Hylander moved to Bolivia with his family, but decided to return to Sweden in early 2016.

Raj Montana Band re-united in 2018, playing gigs and planning a new album.

== Discography ==
=== Albums ===
Year	Album	Credits	Peak positions
Year	Album	Credits	SWE
1982	Bella notte	Dan Hylander & Raj Montana Band	3
1984	...om änglar & sjakaler	Dan Hylander & Raj Montana Band	3
1985	Telegram	Py Bäckman & Dan Hylander	14
1986	Kung av onsdag	Dan Hylander & Kosmonaut	4
1988	Café sorgenfri	Dan Hylander & Kosmonaut	12
1990	Lycklig måne	Dan Hylander	29
2011	Den försenade mannen	Dan Hylander & Orkester	4
2016	Kan själv	Dan Hylander & Orkester	47
2019	Indigo	Dan Hylander & Raj Montana Band	4

Live albums

Year	Album	Credits	Peak positions
Year	Album	Credits	SWE
2012	Förscenad - Live	Dan Hylander & Orkester	15

Compilation albums

Year	Album	Credits	Peak positions
Year	Album	Credits	SWE
1997	Hits	Raj Montana Band, Py Bäckman & Dan Hylander	15
