= Det är så jag säger det =

Studio album by Håkan Hellström
- Released: 28 October 2002

Det är så jag säger det is the second studio album by Swedish pop artist Håkan Hellström, released on 28 October 2002. In English, the title would be: "That is how I say it."

Musically, the album evolved from Hellström's debut and a deepening of his widespread influences containing, among others, Brazilian samba music and Swedish folk ballad singers Evert Taube and Cornelis Vreeswijk. The music is also reminiscent of genuinely British soul artists such as Dexys Midnight Runners (more or less explicitly references in "Kom igen Lena!" (Come On Lena!)) and The Redskins. The track "Minnen av aprilhimlen" (Memories of the April Sky) incorporates the chorale melody of the Bach cantata Herz und Mund und Tat und Leben, BWV 147.

Lyrically Hellström once again draws inspiration from Bob Dylan, Paul Weller and other acknowledged lyricists. "Minnen av aprilhimlen" is possibly a vague reference to Hellström's great favourites Jesus and Mary Chain's "April Skies" and also contains a direct quote from the Pavement song "Gold Soundz". On the title track, Hellström sings "Vänder om / hon bara ler / allén är inte så dålig ändå" ("Turning around / she just smiles / the boulevard isn't so bad after all"), a tribute to the song "Tiny Dancer" by Elton John: "turning back / she just laughs / the boulevard is not that bad".

Hellström's style of borrowing is also apparent in the cover design, which bears a slight stylistic resemblance to Bob Dylan's 1964 album The Times They Are a-Changin'.

== Track listing ==
1. "Mitt Gullbergs kaj paradis" My Gullberg's quay Paradise
2. "Förhoppningar och regnbågar" Hopes and Rainbows
3. "Den fulaste flickan i världen" The Ugliest Girl in the World
4. "Kom igen Lena!" Come on Lena!
5. "Här kommer lyckan för hundar som oss" Here Comes Happiness For Dogs Like Us
6. "Rockenroll, blåa ögon - igen" Rock & Roll, Blue Eyes - Again
7. "Gråsparven när hon sjunger" The House Sparrow As She Sings
8. "Minnen av aprilhimlen" Memories of the April Sky
9. "Mississippi kan vänta" Mississippi Can Wait
10. "Det är så jag säger det" That Is How I Say It

== Charts ==
=== Weekly charts ===
Chart (2002)	Peak position	Certification
Norwegian Albums (VG-lista)	3	
Sweden (Sverigetopplistan)	1	GLF: Platinum

=== Year-end charts ===
Chart (2002)	Position
Swedish Albums (Sverigetopplistan)	9
