= Tomas Ledin =

Swedish singer, songwriter, musician, and record producer

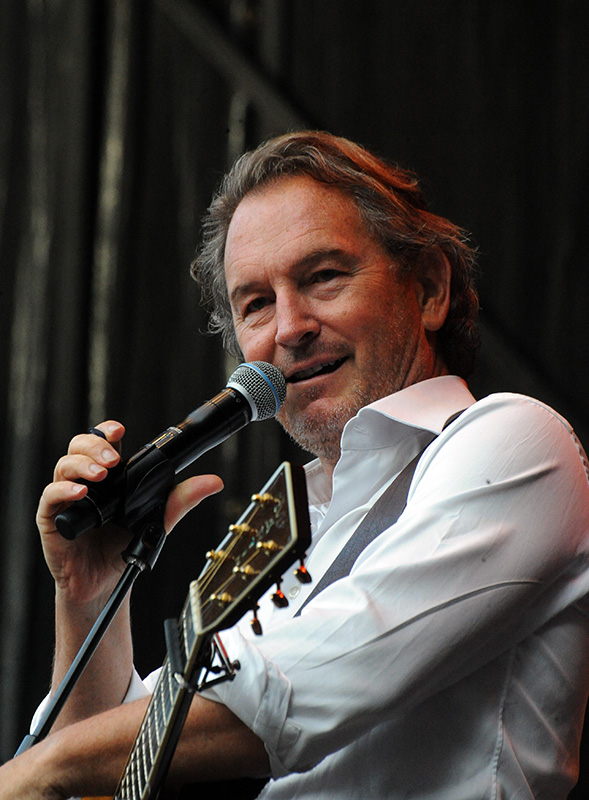
- Ledin performing in August 2014

Background information
- Born: 25 February 1952 (age 74); Östersund, Sweden
- Occupations: Singer; songwriter; musician; record producer
- Years active: 1972–present
- Website: tomasledin.com
- Musical career
- Genres: Rock; pop
- Instruments: Vocals; guitar; piano; clarinet; mandolin; harmonica
- Label: Polar

Tomas Folke Jonas Ledin (Swedish pronunciation: [ˈtʊ̌mːas ˈfɔ̂lːkɛ ˈjûːnas lɛˈdiːn]; born 25 February 1952) is a Swedish singer, songwriter, musician, and record producer. He grew up in the town of Sandviken, Sweden and has sold 3 million records.

== Career ==
Tomas Ledin started his career in 1972 when his first single, "Då ska jag spela", was a big hit. Other successful songs followed: "Blå, blå känslor" (1973), (covered by Björn Skifs), "Knivhuggarrock" (1975), "Festen har börjat" (1976), and "I natt är jag din" (1977). At the beginning of the 1970s, Ledin was influenced by hippie fashion and demonstrated against the Vietnam War. He also took part in a Swedish stage production of the musical Godspell in 1975 and performed in 140 concerts in the Swedish folkparks in 1977.

In 1979, ABBA member Benny Andersson offered him a chance to record for the group's company Polar Music. The singer joined ABBA on their 1979–1980 tour as a backing vocalist, but also got the opportunity to sing his own composition "Not Bad at All" during the show. Tomas Ledin also appeared on the ABBA Live DVD and on the Super Trouper Video.

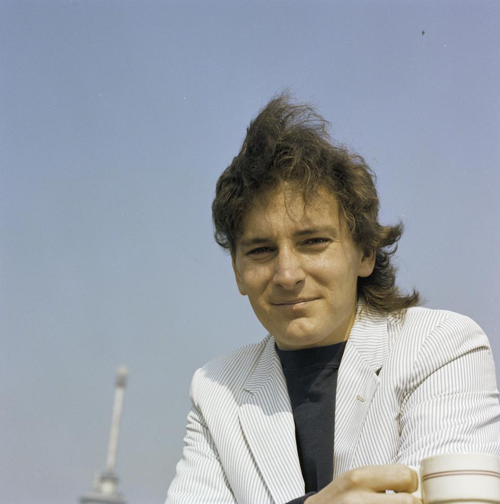
Tomas Ledin in 1980

He won the Swedish Melodifestivalen in 1980 and represented Sweden in the Eurovision Song Contest that year with "Just nu!". The song was a big hit in Scandinavia, and also in Greece and Portugal since Ledin recorded an English version, "Right Now!".

In 1982, he released the duet "Never Again" with Agnetha Fältskog of ABBA fame; the song reached number one in Chile (in its Spanish version "Ya nunca más") and was popular across Europe. Ledin also composed "Take Good Care of Your Children", which Fältskog released in 1983 on her album Wrap Your Arms Around Me. Another composition by the singer, "I Got Something", was released by Anni-Frid Lyngstad of ABBA on her album Something's Going On.

In the 1980s, Ledin was very successful in Scandinavia but his career abroad failed to reach the same level. He nevertheless toured Germany and the Netherlands on a small scale in 1982, and the following year, he played in front of 60,000 people at the Olympic stadium in Berlin, in a show with other international acts. He decided to put an end to his career in 1984 and started to act as a producer for Record Station, his wife's record company. He discovered other singers and successfully produced artists such as Pugh Rogefeldt and Magnus Uggla. In 1985, he organized a concert for ANC featuring several Swedish artists.

Three years later, Tomas Ledin started to compose again and wrote songs in English. The album Down on the Pleasure Avenue was released but was not successful. Ledin was very disappointed but started to compose again, in Swedish this time. He started to enjoy success again in 1990 when he released a compilation and a new album, Tillfälligheternas spel, and has been one of the best selling artists in Sweden since then.

In 2000, 260,000 copies of his compilation album Festen har börjat (samlingsalbum) were sold in Sweden, which meant he was awarded three platinum records there. In 2002, he went on the biggest tour ever planned in Scandinavia and performed in 27 shows in Sweden and 8 shows in the rest of Scandinavia. More than 250,000 people saw the show in Northern Europe.

Ledin's songs have been turned into a jukebox musical film En del av mitt hjärta (A Piece of My Heart), which was released in 2019, directed by Edward af Sillén, who Ledin worked with in 2011 for his stage show Showtime.

== Personal life ==
Ledin has been married since 1983 to record company president Marie Ledin, daughter of Stig Anderson. They have two sons together, named John and Theo.

== Discography ==
- Med vidöppna fönster (2004)
- Plektrum (2006)
- 500 dagar om året (2009)

== Citations ==
Preceded by Ted Gärdestad with "Satellit"	Sweden in the Eurovision Song Contest; 1980	Succeeded by Björn Skifs with "Fångad i en dröm"
