= In Full Regalia =

Studio album by the Ark
- Released: 26 April 2010
- Genre: Rock
- Label: Universal Music
- Producer: Fabian Torsson

The Ark chronology
Prayer for the Weekend (2007)	In Full Regalia (2010)	Arkeology (2011)

Singles from In Full Regalia
- 1. "Superstar" Released: 29 March 2010; 2. "Stay with Me" Released: 7 June 2010

Professional ratings
Review scores
Source	Rating
Allmusic	3/5 stars

In Full Regalia is the fifth and final studio album by Swedish band the Ark. It has been released in a new unique format: it has been released as a magazine with 100 pages containing a history of the band's 20-year career as well as the actual album. In its first week it reached number two on the Swedish Albums Chart and was certified Gold in Sweden. The lead single "Superstar" was released on 29 March 2010. The second single was announced to be "Stay with Me" and was released digitally on 7 June.

== Track listing ==
All songs written by Ola Salo:

1. "Take a Shine to Me" – 3:02
2. "Superstar" – 4:38
3. "Stay with Me" – 4:57
4. "Singing 'Bout the City" – 5:10
5. "Have You Ever Heard a Song" – 4:37
6. "Publicity Seeking Rockers" – 3:20
7. "I'll Have My Way with You, Frankie" – 4:14
8. "All Those Days" – 4:13
9. "Hygiene Squad" – 2:28
10. "The Red Cap" – 4:13

== Personnel ==
- Ola Salo – lead vocals, guitar
- Leari – bass guitar
- Jepson – guitar
- Martin Axén – guitar, backing vocals
- Sylvester Schlegel – drums, percussion, backing vocals
- Jens Andersson – keyboards

== Additional personnel ==
- Henrik Hansson – piano

This is the first album in which Salo has been credited as playing guitar whereas previously he was credited as either vocals and keyboards (We Are the Ark, In Lust We Trust, State of The Ark) or just vocals (Prayer for the Weekend). However it is apparent that Salo played guitar at live performances in the 1990s it is unclear what he contributed to The Ark EP (Racing with the Rabbits) (other than vocals and lyrics) as there is no personnel list available.
