= Absolutely No Decorum =

Single by the Ark

from the album Prayer for the Weekend
- A-side: "Absolutely No Decorum"
- Released: January 2007
- Genre: glam rock
- Songwriter(s): Ola Salo
- Producer(s): Marco Manieri, the Ark

The Ark singles chronology
| "Trust Is Shareware" (2006) | "Absolutely No Decorum" (2007) | "The Worrying Kind" (2007) |

"Absolutely No Decorum" is a song written by Ola Salo and recorded on the Ark's album Prayer for the Weekend and only became available through digital download. The single peaked at 26th position at the Swedish singles chart.

During the 5th week the song entered Trackslistan where its list successes made it one of the greatest Trackslistan hits of 2007. The song was originally performed at "P3 Guld" in January 2007, and charted at Svensktoppen for eight weeks between 18 February-8 April 2007, before getting knocked out, peaking at 4th position.

== Charts ==
| Chart (2007) | Peak position |
|---|---|
| Sweden (Sverigetopplistan) | 26 |
