= Björnö =

- Location within Kronoberg Location within Sweden
- Coordinates: 57°10′N 14°36′E
- Country: Sweden
- Province: Småland
- County: Kronoberg County
- Municipality: Växjö Municipality

Area
  - Total: 0.16 km^{2} (0.062 sq mi)

Population (31 December 2010)
  - Total: 215
  - Density: 1,309/km^{2} (3,390/sq mi)
- Time zone: UTC+1 (CET)
  - Summer (DST): UTC+2 (CEST)

Björnö is a locality situated in Växjö Municipality, Kronoberg County, Sweden with 215 inhabitants in 2010.
