= 2009 ESC Youth League =

- League: ESC Youth League
- Sport: Air rifle and air pistol
- Duration: 23 May – 4 October
- Teams: 13 (rifle), 12 (pistol)

10 m air rifle
- League champions: Serbia
- Runners-up: Croatia

10 m air pistol
- League champions: Spain
- Runners-up: Poland

Seasons
- 2011 →

The 2009 ESC Youth League was the inaugural season for the ESC Youth League in 10 metre air rifle and 10 metre air pistol, for shooters born 1991–1995. Three regional competitions were held in May, and six teams per event advanced to the final round, held in Helsingør, Denmark, on 3–4 October.

== Eastern region ==
Eastern region (red)

The Eastern regional qualification groups were held in Belgrade on 30 and 31 May. Russia, Serbia, Croatia and Bulgaria had entered teams in both events, Bosnia and Herzegovina only in air rifle, and Romania only in air pistol. Thus, no teams had to be eliminated prior to the qualification stage. Romania and Bulgaria withdrew before the qualification stage.

Serbia and Croatia advanced in air rifle, while the Russians won both their air pistol matches 3–0 and advanced together with Serbia.

=== Air rifle round-robin ===
Team	GP	W	L	IPW	IPL	PTS
Serbia	3	3	0	7	2	6
Croatia	3	2	1	6	3	4
Russia	3	1	2	4	5	2
Bosnia and Herzegovina	3	0	3	1	8	0

All times are local (UTC+2).

30 May 2009; 10:00
Ognjen Huskić
Bojan Bolić

Bosnia and Herzegovina	0–3	Serbia
Score by game:
Dunja Bihorac	382–397	Katarina Biserčić
383–384	Tašana Bogatinovski
370–390	Dragana Todorović

30 May 2009; 11:30
Anna Zhukova
Maria Andreychikova

Russia	1–2	Croatia
Score by game:
Yevgeny Grigoryev	386–392	Tanja Perec
391–384	Filip Novoselac
384–388	Tiziano Šuran

30 May 2009; 14:30
Tašana Bogatinovski
Dragana Todorović

Serbia	2–1	Croatia
Score by game:
Katarina Biserčić	396–391	Tanja Perec
385–394	Filip Novoselac
396–392	Tiziano Šuran

31 May 2009; 08:30
Anna Zhukova
Yelena Yegorova

Russia	2–1	Bosnia and Herzegovina
Score by game:
Yevgeny Grigoryev	383–387	Dunja Bihorac
390–378	Ognjen Huskić
386–378	Bojan Bolić

31 May 2009; 11:30
Ognjen Huskić
Bojan Bolić

Bosnia and Herzegovina	0–3	Croatia
Score by game:
Dunja Bihorac	387–393	Tanja Perec
383–384	Filip Novoselac
375–388	Tiziano Šuran

31 May 2009; 13:00
Maria Andreychikova
Yevgeny Panchenko

Russia	1–2	Serbia
Score by game:
Anna Zhukova	(9) 395–395 (10)	Katarina Biserčić
393–390	Tašana Bogatinovski
390–395	Dragana Todorović

=== Air pistol round-robin ===
Team	GP	W	L	IPW	IPL	PTS
Russia	2	2	0	6	0	4
Serbia	2	1	1	2	4	2
Croatia	2	0	2	1	5	0

All times are local (UTC+2).

30 May 2009; 08:30
Danijel Mostarčić
Josipa Božić

Croatia	0–3	Russia
Score by game:
Stipe Hrgović	370–378	Ivan Khrykov
358–378	Kseniya Solovyeva
357–377	Denis Kartashov

30 May 2009; 13:00
Kseniya Solovyeva
Mars Khapytov

Russia	3–0	Serbia
Score by game:
Ivan Khrykov	379–371	Miloš Milanović
371–369	Srećko Pušica
369–359	Ana Simić

31 May 2009; 10:00
Danijel Mostarčić
Josipa Božić

Croatia	1–2	Serbia
Score by game:
Stipe Hrgović	362–370	Miloš Milanović
362–367	Srećko Pušica
367–358	Ana Simić

== Northern region ==
Northern region (blue)

In the Northern region, Poland (1168), Norway (1167), Finland (1166), Denmark (1163) and Sweden (1163) qualified from the 2008 preliminary air rifle rounds while Latvia (1142) and Lithuania (1139) were eliminated. In air pistol, all five teams (Poland, Sweden, Lithuania, Finland and Norway) qualified. Finland, while qualified in both events, withdrew from the competition before the qualification stage.

The Northern regional qualification groups were held in Rottne, Sweden, on 23 and 24 May. The air rifle group was dominated by Sweden, achieving the highest possible total (9–0), with Poland finishing second; the same teams advanced in air pistol, although in reversed order.

=== Air rifle round-robin ===
Team	GP	W	L	IPW	IPL	PTS
Sweden	3	3	0	9	0	6
Poland	3	2	1	5	4	4
Norway	3	1	2	3	6	2
Denmark	3	0	3	1	8	0

All times are local (UTC+2).

23 May 2009; 09:00
Emelie Fagerström
Johanna Lindström

Sweden	3–0	Norway
Score by game:
Hanna Säker	392–374	Malin Westerheim
391–383	Hanne Sangolt
392–390	Julie Andrea Bakken

23 May 2009; 10:45
Mathilde Høegsberg
Michael Christensen

Denmark	0–3	Poland
Score by game:
Stine H. Nielsen	383–388	Wioletta Szczurek
377–382	Kinga Kolodziej
382–386	Katarzyna Kobus

23 May 2009; 14:00
Emelie Fagerström
Hanna Säker

Sweden	3–0	Denmark
Score by game:
Chatrin Jönsson	393–388	Stine H. Nielsen
390–380	Mathilde Høegsberg
391–387	Michael Christensen

23 May 2009; 15:45
Hanne Sangolt
Julie Andrea Bakken

Norway	1–2	Poland
Score by game:
Malin Westerheim	383–387	Magdalena Obacz
380–385	Wioletta Szczurek
395–385	Kinga Kolodziej

24 May 2009; 09:00
Johanna Lindström
Chatrin Jönsson

Sweden	3–0	Poland
Score by game:
Hanna Säker	392–390	Magdalena Obacz
393–390	Kinga Kolodziej
394–388	Katarzyna Kobus

24 May 2009; 10:45
Hanne Sangolt
Julie Andrea Bakken

Norway	2–1	Denmark
Score by game:
Malin Westerheim	384–383	Stine H. Nielsen
379–384	Mathilde Høegsberg
384–381	Michael Christensen

=== Air pistol round-robin ===
Team	GP	W	L	IPW	IPL	PTS
Poland	3	3	0	7	2	6
Sweden	3	2	1	5	4	4
Lithuania	3	1	2	4	5	2
Norway	3	0	3	2	7	0

All times are local (UTC+2).

23 May 2009; 09:00
Lukasz Mowczan
Natalia Kondracka

Poland	2–1	Norway
Score by game:
Tomasz Palamarz	382–362	Petter Gulliksen
370–361	Lasse Pevik
355–356	Adrian Blikra

23 May 2009; 10:45
Emma Nilsson
Johanna Carlsson

Sweden	2–1	Lithuania
Score by game:
Viktor Hoving	374–358	Justina Ramanauskaite
363–356	Benita Vysniauskaite
357–371	Kestutis Peciukonis

23 May 2009; 14:00
Lukasz Mowczan
Wioletta Szymanska

Poland	3–0	Sweden
Score by game:
Tomasz Palamarz	382–365	Viktor Hoving
375–367	Emma Nilsson
368–350	Vendela Sörensson

23 May 2009; 15:45
Lasse Pevik
Adrian Blikra

Norway	1–2	Lithuania
Score by game:
Petter Gulliksen	(9) 359–359 (7)	Justina Ramanauskaite
364–369	Benita Vysniauskaite
358–373	Kestutis Peciukonis

24 May 2009; 09:00
Lukasz Mowczan
Wioletta Szymanska

Poland	2–1	Lithuania
Score by game:
Tomasz Palamarz	381–363	Justina Ramanauskaite
378–367	Benita Vysniauskaite
373–374	Kestutis Peciukonis

24 May 2009; 10:45
Lasse Pevik
Adrian Blikra

Norway	0–3	Sweden
Score by game:
Petter Gulliksen	361–372	Viktor Hoving
360–370	Johanna Carlsson
354–361	Vendela Sörensson

== Western region ==
Western region (green)

In the Western region, joint preliminary rounds were held in 2008 at Nitra (Slovakia) and Fleury-les-Aubrais (France). In air rifle, Spain (1166), Italy (1164), Hungary (1163), Slovakia (1159) and Slovenia (1157) qualified for the group stage while France (1153), Austria (1148), Luxembourg (1111) and Belgium (1096) were eliminated. Slovakia withdrew prior to the qualification stage and were replaced by France. Spain (1116), Italy (1100) and Slovenia (1094) also had qualified in air pistol, along with Belgium (1096) and France (1094). Slovakia (1083) and Hungary (1078) were eliminated.

The Western regional qualification groups were held in Milan on 30 and 31 May, just after Milan's 2009 ISSF World Cup competition. Hungary and Slovenia advanced to the finals in air rifle, Spain and Italy in air pistol.

=== Air rifle round-robin ===
Team	GP	W	L	IPW	IPL	PTS
Hungary	4	4	0	10	2	8
Slovenia	4	3	1	6	6	6
Italy	4	2	2	6	6	4
Spain	4	1	3	5	7	2
France	4	0	4	3	9	0

All times are local (UTC+2).

30 May 2009; 09:00
Mira Biatovszki
Istvan Kapas

Hungary	3–0	France
Score by game:
Kata Veres	395–385	Aurélie Chevance
391–387	Marie Sanseigne
387–384	Jennifer Olry

30 May 2009; 09:00
Paula Grande
Carlos Jimenez

Spain	1–2	Italy
Score by game:
Rodrigo Gil	385–386	Barbara Gambaro
388–391	Simon Weithaler
386–385	Sybille Bregenzer

30 May 2009; 11:30
Mira Biatovszki
Istvan Kapas

Hungary	3–0	Slovenia
Score by game:
Kata Veres	391–377	Natalija Otonicar
391–388	Ziva Dvorsak
388–383	Nina Juvan

30 May 2009; 11:30
Paula Grande
Elena Garcia

Spain	2–1	France
Score by game:
Rodrigo Gil	387–381	Jennifer Olry
393–386	Marie Sanseigne
378–379	Boris Pigny

30 May 2009; 14:00
Mara Burgo
Lorenzo Bacci

Italy	1–2	Slovenia
Score by game:
Tommaso Garofalo	390–381	Natalija Otonicar
386–387	Ziva Dvorsak
(9) 380–380 (10)	Nina Juvan

31 May 2009; 08:30
Mira Biatovszki
Istvan Kapas

Hungary	2–1	Spain
Score by game:
Kata Veres	395–389	Rodrigo Gil
394–389	Paula Grande
385–390	Carlos Jimenez

31 May 2009; 08:30
Boris Pigny
Jennifer Olry

France	1–2	Italy
Score by game:
Aurélie Chevance	386–392	Barbara Gambaro
381–389	Simon Weithaler
385–384	Tommaso Garofalo

31 May 2009; 10:00
Paula Grande
Elena Garcia

Spain	1–2	Slovenia
Score by game:
Rodrigo Gil	390–387	Nina Juvan
390–392	Ziva Dvorsak
376–385	Natalija Otonicar

31 May 2009; 11:30
Mira Biatovszki
Istvan Kapas

Hungary	2–1	Italy
Score by game:
Kata Veres	397–394	Barbara Gambaro
393–387	Simon Weithaler
374–385	Mara Burgo

31 May 2009; 11:30
Marie Sanseigne
Boris Pigny

France	1–2	Slovenia
Score by game:
Aurélie Chevance	392–377	Natalija Otonicar
(9) 390–390 (10)	Ziva Dvorsak
383–385	Nina Juvan

=== Air pistol round-robin ===
Team	GP	W	L	IPW	IPL	PTS
Spain	4	4	0	8	4	8
Italy	4	3	1	10	2	6
Belgium	4	1	3	4	8	2
France	4	1	3	4	8	2
Slovenia	4	1	3	4	8	2

All times are local (UTC+2).

30 May 2009; 09:00
Dino Briganti
Joele Priore

Italy	1–2	Spain
Score by game:
Andrea Scafa	371–373	Javier Sanchez
(10) 374–374 (9)	Francisco Hernandez
366–367	Cristina Munoz

30 May 2009; 09:00
Damien Maillou
Laurie Le Gal

France	1–2	Slovenia
Score by game:
Gautier Pascal	357–364	Mojca Kolman
367–363	Simona Molan
354–367	Klemen Juvan

30 May 2009; 11:30
Dino Briganti
Chiara Gianni

Italy	3–0	Belgium
Score by game:
Andrea Scafa	374–359	Johan Dehon
367–342	Quentin Schenkels
357–357	Denis Servais

30 May 2009; 11:30
Florian Fouquet
Laurie Le Gal

France	1–2	Spain
Score by game:
Damien Maillou	362–378	Javier Sanchez
370–368	Francisco Hernandez
359–377	Mercedes Soto

30 May 2009; 14:00
Simona Molan
Klemen Juvan

Slovenia	1–2	Belgium
Score by game:
Mojca Kolman	361–362	Denis Servais
345–350	Johan Dehon
361–342	Quentin Schenkels

31 May 2009; 08:30
Dino Briganti
Joele Priore

Italy	3–0	France
Score by game:
Andrea Scafa	371–365	Gautier Pascal
377–377	Florian Fouquet
377–373	Damien Maillou

31 May 2009; 08:30
Cristina Munoz
Mercedes Soto

Spain	2–1	Slovenia
Score by game:
Javier Sanchez	384–363	Mojca Kolman
368–352	Simona Molan
367–372	Klemen Juvan

31 May 2009; 10:00
Gautier Pascal
Laurie Le Gal

France	2–1	Belgium
Score by game:
Florian Fouquet	(9) 371–371 (0)	Denis Servais
354–352	Johan Dehon
352–359	Quentin Schenkels

31 May 2009; 11:30
Dino Briganti
Joele Priore

Italy	3–0	Slovenia
Score by game:
Andrea Scafa	371–368	Klemen Juvan
378–358	Mojca Kolman
371–351	Simona Molan

31 May 2009; 11:30
Cristina Munoz
Mercedes Soto

Spain	2–1	Belgium
Score by game:
Francisco Hernandez	358–359	Johan Dehon
381–353	Quentin Schenkels
373–367	Denis Servais

== Finals ==
The finals were held in Helsingør, Denmark, on 3–4 October. They were originally scheduled for Copenhagen but had to be moved because of weapon regulations surrounding the 13th Olympic Congress, held simultaneously in the capital.

The top two teams from each region qualified for the finals, where they were divided into two groups of three teams each. Round-robins were held in these groups on Saturday. The next day, the group runners-up faced each other for the bronze medals, and the group winners competed for the gold medals.

=== Air rifle, group 1 ===
Team	GP	W	L	IPW	IPL	PTS
Serbia	2	2	0	4	2	4
Poland	2	1	1	3	3	2
Sweden	2	0	2	2	4	0

All times are local (UTC+2).

3 October 2009; 09:00
Kinga Kolodziel
Wioletta Szczurek

Poland	2–1	Sweden
Score by game:
Magdalena Obacz	387–386	Chatrin Jönsson
376–379	Emelie Fagerström
388–372	Johanna Lindström

3 October 2009; 12:30
Kinga Kolodziel
Wioletta Szczurek

Poland	1–2	Serbia
Score by game:
Magdalena Obacz	386–395	Katarina Bisercic
388–392	Dragana Todorovic
385–381	Borislav Mazinjanin

3 October 2009; 16:00
Dragana Todorovic
Borislav Mazinjanin

Serbia	2–1	Sweden
Score by game:
Katarina Bisercic	389–389	Chatrin Jönsson
396–391	Emelie Fagerström
384–393	Hanna Säker

=== Air rifle, group 2 ===
Team	GP	W	L	IPW	IPL	PTS
Croatia	2	2	0	4	2	4
Hungary	2	1	1	3	3	2
Slovenia	2	0	2	2	4	0

All times are local (UTC+2).

3 October 2009; 09:00
Ziva Dvorsak
Nina Juvan

Slovenia	1–2	Croatia
Score by game:
Natalija Otonicar	389–393	Tanja Perec
394–383	Filip Novoselac
382–390	Tiziano Suran

3 October 2009; 12:30
Ziva Dvorsak
Nina Juvan

Slovenia	1–2	Hungary
Score by game:
Natalija Otonicar	386–390	Kata Veres
390–390	Mira Biatovski
380–386	Istvan Kapas

3 October 2009; 16:00
Mira Biatovski
Istvan Kapas

Hungary	1–2	Croatia
Score by game:
Kata Veres	389–390	Tanja Perec
387–380	Filip Novoselac
380–383	Tiziano Suran

=== Air pistol, group 1 ===
Team	GP	W	L	IPW	IPL	PTS
Spain	2	2	0	4	2	4
Russia	2	1	1	4	2	2
Sweden	2	0	2	1	5	0

All times are local (UTC+2).

3 October 2009; 09:00
Emma Nilsson
Johanna Carlsson

Sweden	0–3	Russia
Score by game:
Viktor Hoving	375–382	Nikolay Kilin
363–367	Yekaterina Levina
343–371	Pavel Antropov

3 October 2009; 12:30
Emma Nilsson
Vendela Sörensson

Sweden	1–2	Spain
Score by game:
Viktor Hoving	368–374	Javier Sanchez
371–359	Cristina Munoz
355–371	Francisco Hernandes

3 October 2009; 16:00
Cristina Munoz
Mercedes Soto

Spain	2–1	Russia
Score by game:
Javier Sanchez	359–371	Ksenia Solovyeva
373–369	Ivan Khrykov
372–371	Yekaterina Barsukova

=== Air pistol, group 2 ===
Serbia had qualified for this group but withdrew; to compensate for this, the remaining teams faced each other twice.

Team	GP	W	L	IPW	IPL	PTS
Poland	2	2	0	4	2	4
Italy	2	0	2	2	4	0

All times are local (UTC+2).

3 October 2009; 09:00
Lukasz Mowczan
Dominika Bartosz

Poland	2–1	Italy
Score by game:
Tomasz Palamarz	380–367	Andrea Scafa
373–381	Dino Briganti
364–359	Joele Priore

3 October 2009; 12:30
Lukasz Mowczan
Karolina Baszen

Poland	2–1	Italy
Score by game:
Tomasz Palamarz	374–379	Andrea Scafa
379–372	Dino Briganti
371–366	Dario Di Martino

=== Medal matches ===
All times are local (UTC+2).

Bronze medal match, air pistol

4 October 2009; 09:00
Ksenia Solovyeva
Ivan Khrykov

Russia	3–0	Italy
Score by game:
Nikolay Kilin	379–374	Andrea Scafa
375–370	Dino Briganti
367–365	Dario Di Martino

Bronze medal match, air rifle

4 October 2009; 09:00
Kinga Kolodziel
Wioletta Szczurek

Poland	1–2	Hungary
Score by game:
Magdalena Obacz	389–392	Kata Veres
382–389	Mira Biatovski
390–378	Istvan Kapas

Final, air pistol

4 October 2009; 10:30
Cristina Munoz
Francisco Hernandez

Spain	2–1	Poland
Score by game:
Mercedes Soto	360–384	Tomasz Palamarz
373–367	Lukasz Mowczan
368–363	Karolina Baszen

Final, air rifle

4 October 2009; 12:00
Dragana Todorovic
Borislav Mazinjanin

Serbia	2–1	Croatia
Score by game:
Katarina Bisercic	394–387	Tanja Perec
395–382	Filip Novoselac
385–387	Tiziano Suran
