= State of The Ark =

Studio album by the Ark
- Released: 27 December 2004
- Genre: Rock
- Length: 41:46
- Label: EMI/Virgin Records
- Producer: Jens Andersson, Nathan Larson, Ola Salo, Per Sunding

The Ark chronology
In Lust We Trust (2002)	State of The Ark (2004)	Prayer for the Weekend (2007)

Singles from State of The Ark
- 1. "One of Us Is Gonna Die Young" Released: 2004; 2. "Clamour for Glamour" Released: 2005; 3. "Trust Is Shareware" Released: 2005

Professional ratings
Review scores
Source	Rating
Allmusic	link

State of The Ark was released on 27 December 2004 and is the third studio album from the Swedish rock band the Ark, and their final as a quintet. In it, the band's sound became more synthesizer-flavoured and keyboard-oriented, a departure from the more organic glam rock sound of the first two albums. Three singles were released from the album: "One of Us Is Gonna Die Young", "Clamour for Glamour" and "Trust Is Shareware", the latter being a new recording specifically made for single release. "This Piece of Poetry Is Meant to Do Harm" appears in John Cameron Mitchell's film Shortbus and the band has stated that "Hey Kwanongoma!" was inspired by the marimba piece "Rugare 2" by Alport Mhlanga.

== Track listing ==
All songs were written by Ola Salo, except where noted.

1. "This Piece of Poetry Is Meant to Do Harm" – 3:27
2. "Rock City Wankers" – 4:10
3. "Clamour for Glamour" – 3:09
4. "One of Us Is Gonna Die Young" – 3:28
5. "Let Me Down Gently" – 2:55
6. "Hey Kwanongoma!" – 4:48
7. "The Others" – 3:27
8. "Girl You're Gonna Get 'Em (Real Soon)" – 3:27
9. "Deliver Us from Free Will" – 5:06
10. "No End" (Music: Lars Ljungberg, Lyrics: Ola Salo) – 3:24
11. "Trust Is Shareware" – 4:25

== Personnel ==
=== The Ark ===
- Ola Salo – lead vocals, percussion, keyboards
- Martin Axén – rhythm guitar, backing vocals
- Mikael Jepson – lead guitar
- Lars "Leari" Ljungberg – bass
- Sylvester Schlegel – drums, backing vocals

=== Additional musicians ===
- Jens Andersson – producer, sound engineer, additional percussion, keyboards
- Åsa Håkansson – strings
- Mattias Rodrick – strings
- Anna Rocén – strings
- Erika Lilja – backing vocals
- Maria Lilja – backing vocals
- Erik Hjärpe – voice synthesizing

== Charts ==
=== Weekly charts ===
Chart (2004–05)	Peak position
Finnish Albums (Suomen virallinen lista)	8
Swedish Albums (Sverigetopplistan)	1

=== Year-end charts ===
Chart (2005)	Position
Swedish Albums (Sverigetopplistan)	54
