= One of Us Is Gonna Die Young =

Single by the Ark

from the album State of The Ark
- Released: 2004
- Genre: Glam rock
- Label: EMI
- Songwriter(s): Ola Salo

The Ark singles chronology
"Disease" (2003)	"One of Us Is Gonna Die Young" (2004)	"Clamour for Glamour" (2005)

"One of Us Is Gonna Die Young" is a song written by Ola Salo and recorded on the Ark's 2004 studio album, State of The Ark. It was released as a single in the same year, peaking at 4th position at the Swedish singles chart.

The song also charted at Trackslistan. Charting at Svensktoppen, it stayed on the chart for 9 weeks between 9 January and 27 February 2005, peaking at 6th position.

== Charts ==
=== Weekly charts ===
Chart (2004–2005)	Peak position
Sweden (Sverigetopplistan)	4

=== Year-end charts ===
Chart (2004)	Position
Sweden (Sverigetopplistan)	94
Chart (2005)	Position
Sweden (Sverigetopplistan)	70
