= Prayer for the Weekend =

Studio album by the Ark
- Released: 11 April 2007
- Genre: Rock
- Length: 42:58
- Label: Roxy Recordings

The Ark chronology
State of The Ark (2004)	Prayer for the Weekend (2007)	In Full Regalia (2010)

Singles from Prayer for the Weekend
- 1. "Absolutely No Decorum" Released: 2007; 2. "The Worrying Kind" Released: 2007; 3. "Prayer for the Weekend" Released: 2007; 4. "Little Dysfunk You" Released: 2007

Professional ratings
Review scores
Source	Rating
Allmusic	link

Prayer for the Weekend was released on 11 April 2007 and is the fourth studio album from Swedish rock band the Ark. It is their first album with the sixth member, keyboard player Jens Andersson.

The album contains, along with the lead single "Absolutely No Decorum", the song "The Worrying Kind", with which the Ark participated in the Eurovision Song Contest 2007, where the song finished 18th.

The singles released from the album are; "Absolutely No Decorum", "The Worrying Kind", "Prayer for the Weekend" and "Little Dysfunk You".

== Track listing ==
All songs written by Ola Salo.

1. "Prayer for the Weekend" – 4:24
2. "The Worrying Kind" – 2:56
3. "Absolutely No Decorum" – 3:47
4. "Little Dysfunk You" – 4:09
5. "New Pollution" – 4:31
6. "Thorazine Corazon" – 3:44
7. "I Pathologize" – 2:54
8. "Death to the Martyrs" – 3:54
9. "All I Want Is You" – 2:58
10. "Gimme Love to Give" – 3:59
11. "Uriel" – 5:42
12. "Any Operator Will Do" – 3:37 (Bonus Track, digital album only)

== Personnel ==
The Ark are:

- Ola Salo – lead vocals, songwriting
- Martin Axén – guitar, backing vocals
- Jepson – guitar, backing vocals
- Leari – bass, backing vocals
- Sylvester Schlegel – drums, electronic drums, programming
- Jens Andersson – keyboards, additional percussion and sound engineering

=== Additional personnel ===
- Jens Lindgård – trombone
- Petter Lindgård – trumpet
- Sven Andersson – saxophone and clarinet
- Filip Runesson – strings
- Måns Block – percussion
- Mauricio Canivilo – percussion
- Christopher Dominique – piano
- Elisabeth Fornander, Oskar Humlebo, Maria Lilja, Simon Koudriavstev and Kristian Pehrsson – additional background vocals
- Jonas Nydessjö & Ola Salo – string arrangements
- Marco Manieri – producer, engineering and mixing
- Thomas Berger and Björn Lindgård – mastering
- Oskar Humlebo – additional production
