= The Ark (Swedish band) =

Swedish glam rock band

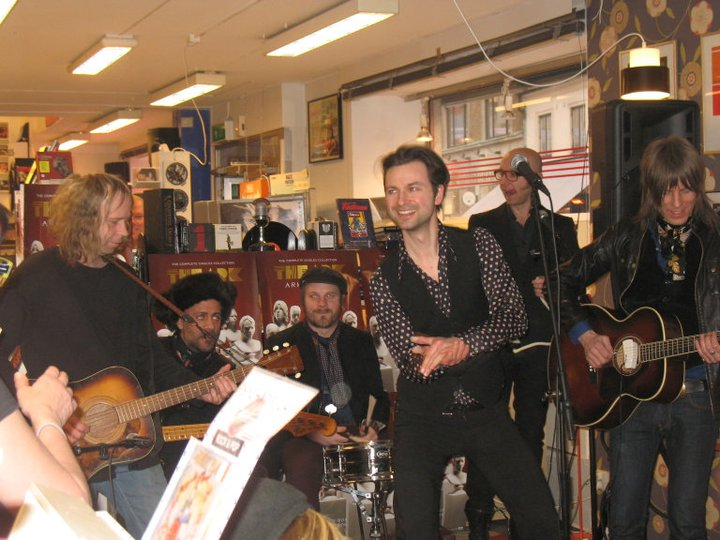

Background information
- Origin: Rottne, Växjö, Sweden
- Genres: Glam rock, pop rock, indie rock, art rock
- Years active: 1991–2011, 2020—present
- Label: Virgin
- Members: Ola Salo; Jepson; Lars "Leari" Ljungberg; Martin Axén; Sylvester Schlegel; Jens Andersson
- Past members: Martin Rosengardten; Magnus Olsson
- Website: thearkworld.com

The Ark is a Swedish glam rock band formed in 1991 and disbanded in 2011. They released five studio albums and became one of the most successful groups in Scandinavia. They released their breakthrough in 2000 with the song "It Takes a Fool to Remain Sane", and since then several hit songs followed; they reunited in 2020.

== History ==
=== Early years ===
==== The Apocalyptic Era (1991–1994) ====
The Ark was formed by Ola Salo (at the time named "Svensson") in the small town of Rottne outside Växjö, Sweden in the summer of 1991. At the age of fourteen, during a family vacation to Ireland, he wrote a poem in six lines with the title The Ark and got the idea to form a new band from this concept.

"And God told me to build an ark

To gather the ones who wander in the dark"

- first lines of the poem The Ark (1991)

He formed the band with his friends Lars "Leari" Ljungberg, Mikael Jepson and Magnus Olsson, all of whom had previously been in the band Ashram, and they held their first band rehearsals in August 1991, and their inspiration for both music and fashion came from the psychedelic 60's and the decadent 70's. According to Ola Salo the name The Ark was not only intended as a religiously grand symbol but also a symbol for sailing away from Rottne and out into the world.

While Ashram had mainly played covers, such as Purple Haze by Jimi Hendrix and Sgt. Pepper's Lonely Hearts Club Band by The Beatles, The Ark was meant to focus on original material. Ola Salo had written some amateurish songs - such as Ashram's only original song "The Kinky Blues" - but in the summer of 1991 he studied the tablature anthology of The Beatles, a book he had received as a Christmas present, and entered a new phase of songwriting.

The Ark's earliest repertoire consisted of covers of "My Generation" by The Who and "Honky Tonk Women" by The Rolling Stones, but also original songs written by Ola Salo such as "Only the Wind" and "Crumble and Fall". The music was in a light-hearted and folky 60's style but the lyrics were dark and epic and the recurring theme was philosophy and religion, most notably about the World's ending with much inspiration from the Book of Revelation in the Christian Bible.

The very first show was played at an outdoor festival on the main street of Växjö in mid-August 1991. On November 16 that same year, the band played their first club show at a venue called Uffes källare in Växjö, as the support act for the band The Shiremen who were fronted by Leari's brother Pelle.

The band was totally unknown outside Växjö but got a local audience. They wanted to make every concert unique, and Ola Salo wrote new songs for each concert. In 1992 the rock club Café Kristina released a double album to promote the local scene, and The Ark participated with the song "The Lamb". This is their first official recording, and for this song they also made their first music video. The song became a small hit in the underground scene of Växjö, and the band had secured a small but devoted local audience.

In the autumn of 1992 the band changed drummer, since Magnus Olsson had chosen a school that demanded much of his time on weekends and since he had also enlisted with the Swedish Home Guard. He was replaced with Markus Rosengardten who was a school friend to Ola Salo.

Ola Salo kept on writing songs with an apocalyptic and darkly philosophical theme, with titles such as "Merciful Sledge", "The World's Aflame", "Eucharist", "Rip It Out", "Up Against The Wall" and "My Sin". The philosopher Friedrich Nietzsche had become a major influence. The music had grown darker, heavier and more psychedelic with complicated chord changes. But at the same time, The Ark wanted to break down the barriers between the art-kids who liked moody and heavy stuff and the kids who liked catchy pop. Songs from this era that would live on and become properly recorded after band's breakthrough are "Topsy Kaiser", "Cygnet to Cygnet", "The Homecomer" (all released on the band's early cd-singles in 2000 and 2001) and "Uriel" (recorded for the album "Prayer for the Weekend" released in 2007).

In 1994 the band made their second music video, this time for the song "The Flower King".

==== Racing With the Rabbits (1995–1996) ====
In the winter of 1995 they travelled to Malmö, Sweden to record some newly written tracks in a studio called Dundret. The songs recorded during this session was "What Do To With Aileen?", "Racing With the Rabbits" and "Cracked Messiah". The youngest band members were by now 18 years.

This studio session inspired Ola Salo to re-think his way of song-writing, and the first song to came out of his new phase was "Like Mortals Do". It became a fan favourite in the band's live set and Ola Salo describes this song as "the biggest hit of The Ark's Apocalyptic Era".

In March 1995 the band returned to Dundret studio and recorded two additional new songs: "I Laid It Down" and "Od Slatrom Ekil".

The Dundret recordings, excluding "What To Do With Aileen?", were compiled into an EP with the title "Racing With The Rabbits", released by the small sub-label Beat That! on a small record label in Malmö called Energy Records. 1000 copies were pressed on CD, less than 100 were sold, and the few reviews where negative.

The band members all moved to Malmö, and planned to record a full-length album with the best songs from the Apocalyptic era. The album was to be called "Speak Loud", but Beat That! could never afford to make the album.

==== Depression and re-ignition (1996–1999) ====
In the years following the failed EP-release, Ola Salo was once again re-thinking his life philosophy and his song-writing. He was experiencing a lingering depression and The Ark was fading from existence. Outside of Växjö the band had no fan-base, and Malmö showed no interest in their music. In 1997 Ola Salo was thinking of breaking up the band, but Martin Axén joined the band as a second guitarist and brought them new energy.

In Malmö, Leari and Jepson had formed a new band with Martin Axén and Jens Andersson, called Stereo Explosion, and together with The Ark they began organizing popular parties to promote their music, often sharing the stage with The Ark. The idea was to make fun music and make people dance. Ola Salo was inspired by this and decided to mix the superficial and seemingly plastic aspects of pop music with his heavy and deep themes. Another important revelation came on December 16, 1996 when Ola Salo, Leari and Jepson went to see Kiss perform at Avicii Arena in Stockholm, and Ola Salo had a clear epiphany of outrageous aesthetics and plastic image, combined with superficial but powerful music. But instead of the shallow lyrics from Kiss, he intended for The Ark to have a much more important message. The dark and drawn-out apocalyptic theme was over, and it was time for accessible pop music for the masses, but with a sincere substance. In 1998 Ola Salo also began to openly embrace his bisexuality, which further added to the band's new image and message.

But when Ola Salo presented his new vision for the band, their drummer Martin Rosengardten was not as rapturous as the other members. He was very sceptical of the new image, and also had little time for the band because of his education at university. By Christmas 1999, he was sacked from the band by Ola Salo. Sylverster Schlegel, an old friend of the band's from Växjö, became their new drummer.

While The Ark were experimenting with their new pop sound they got help from Robert Jelinek from the successful Swedish band, The Creeps. Robert Jelinek gave the demos to Jon Gray who was well-established within the music industry and had his own publishing company called Mad House. One of the demo-songs was "Laurel Wreath", and two others (never released) were called "It Seems To Be The Way" and "Activity". Jon Gray would later become manager for the band and according to Martin Axén he was the first person to really believe in their potential.

The band kept recording new songs as demos, with help from Jens Andersson in the home studio he had built together with Jepson, and the first song they recorded together was "Siamese Centerfold" (later released as a b-side on the cd-single "Let Your Body Decide").

In 1999, a record deal for three albums was signed with Grand Recordings, who were soon to be merged with Virgin Records, and preparations began for the recording of a debut album. Gula studio in Malmö was chosen for the recording, and Marco Manieri was hired as producer.

=== We Are The Ark (2000–2001) ===
In the winter of 2000 The Ark went on tour as the support act for kent during their Hagnesta Hill tour, with the premiere in Gothenburg on January 28 and finishing in Stockholm on March 9. They opened their set with the song "Laurel Wreath" and played soon-to-be hit singles such as "Let Your Body Decide", "Echo Chamber" and "It Takes A Fool To Remain Sane". Halfway through the tour, on January 31, the first single "Let Your Body Decide" was released. The song peaked at #9 in the Swedish charts.

The second single, "It Takes A Fool To Remain Sane", was released on May 15. The song became a huge radio hit and the music video was on heavy rotation in the music channels. The song was also successful in Europe, especially in Italy where it remained a top 10 in the charts for four months.

The debut album, entitled We Are The Ark, was released on September 25. Another title, "Electric Body Design", had been considered based on how a friend of the band had misheard the chorus of "Let Your Body Decide". The album sold 120.000 copies, making it one of Sweden's most successful debut albums of all time.

A recurring theme on the album is to find strength and joy in being an outsider, to choose joy and lust in life and to go one's own way regardless of the stagnated norms and views of the world. This was also the message that Ola Salo and the rest of the band would often speak about in interviews and during concerts. This theme was to remain constant throughout the remainder of the band's career.

On October 18 in Gothenburg, the band began an extensive club tour of Sweden. The setlist for the concerts consisted exclusively of the songs from the album, except the ending song "Racing With The Rabbits" which was the only song included from their former 1990s era. Life on tour was filmed for a documentary titled "Vi är the Ark" (the Swedish translation of the album title) broadcast on Sweden's SVT. A second documentary was later filmed for Sweden's TV4. During the year of 2000, The Ark made more than 60 live performances and ended they year by performing "It Takes A Fool To Remain Sane" together with singer Tommy Körberg on New Year's Eve on Sweden's TV3.

In the summer of 2001 the band played the largest stage of the Hultsfred Festival and teamed up with fellow Swedish pop acts Magnus Uggla and Håkan Hellström for a tour of 22 concerts across the country.

The songs "Echo Chamber" (October 14, 2000) and "Joy Surrender" (April 2, 2001) were released as the third and fourth singles from the album, also to good success. All four singles had music videos.

The Ark was nominated for six Swedish Grammy Awards in 2001, winning Song of the Year for "It Takes A Fool To Remain Sane" and Artist of the Year. Swedish National Radio awarded "It Takes A Fool To Remain Sane" as Most Played Song, and the band won the reader's choice Rockbjörnen award for Group of the Year.

=== In Lust We Trust (2002–2003) ===
In September 2001 the band started working on their second album, which was to be recorded in Stockholm with Peter Kvint as producer. In February 2002 they released their first single of the album, "Calleth You, Cometh I", which was also the main theme song for the Swedish movie "Klassfesten". The song was big success and remained in the Italian top 20 for 4 weeks. The music video was directed by Swedish director and musician Amir Chamdin.

During the recording of the album, the band also did a cover of the song "Kolla kolla" from Swedish progband Nationalteatern for a tribute album.

On August 19 they released their next single, "Father of a Son", which became number-one on the Swedish charts. The song is about homosexuals’ right to adopt. Amir Chamdin once again directed the video, which was inspired by The Who's rock opera Tommy.

The album, titled In Lust We Trust, was released on August 29 and became a gold record the same day. It sold more than 57.000 copies, and because of the increase in illegal downloading it was the first Swedish cd to be encoded with copy protection.

In Lust We Trust was a departure from the style on We Are The Ark, with darker lyrics and a heavier sound. Ola Salo would later say, in the band's official biography No End from 2011, that he had intended to make a second album about lust, joy and happiness, but he was tired from the intense success of their breakthrough year and was not feeling very well, which he says can be heard on darker songs such as "A Virgin Like You" and "2000 Light-years Of Darkness."

Starting on October 22 the band did an autumn tour of Scandinavia with 20 concerts. In addition to songs from the two full-length albums, the setlist of the tour also included the older song "I Laid It Down" from 1996.

Two more singles were lifted from the album, "Tell Me This Night Is Over" released in early November 2002 and "Disease" released in early March 2003. "Disease" was the only single from the album not to have a video.

At the Swedish radio gala P3 Guld in 2003, The Ark were rewarded the prize for best live act.

The band did their final show for the In Lust We Trust-era in Florence, Italy on February 3, 2004, before withdrawing from the stage for almost a year.

=== State of the Ark (2004–2006) ===
The first single of the band's upcoming third album was released in November 2004. It was titled "One Of Us Is Gonna Die Young" and once again saw a somewhat new style for band. The song would become one of the band's biggest crowd favourites, same as the second single "Clamour For Glamour" that was released on March 30, 2005. The album, titled "State of the Ark", was released on December 27, 2004 and had a much more stripped-down and minimalistic sound than the predecessors. The style was intended as a mix 80's dance with modern electro grooves and guitar pop. The album was recorded in Tambourine Studios in Malmö and producers were Per Sunding and Nathan Larsson.

On February 21, 2005 the band began their touring for the album, and would come to play more than 125 concerts in 2005 and 2006. It would remain their most extensive touring for an album cycle.

The closing song on the album, "Trust Is Shareware", was released as a third single on July 13, 2005. It is the first The Ark single since their breakthrough on a major label not to have a physical copy released. "One Of Us Is Gonna Die Young" was re-released in 2006 with a new video intended for the international market.

Beginning in the first half of 2005, The Ark was to be launched in the United States and did much travelling to New York where they gained a small but dedicated audience. Justin Hawkins from the British band The Darkness intended to aid The Ark in their British career and brought them along as support act when The Darkness toured the UK and Ireland in February–March 2006, and also Scandinavia.

In March 2006, The Ark performed at the South by Southwest music festival in Austin, Texas.

In late 2006, Jens Andersson joined The Ark as an official member. He had at that point worked with the band for several years and played on most of their tours.

==== Washington incident ====
On October 22, 2006, The Ark had been invited to perform during the grand opening of the House of Sweden, the new Swedish embassy in Washington, D.C. A crowd of 150 people were attending, including the Swedish ambassador. As often before during their live sets, Ola Salo was characteristically cheeky and full of jokes. When a commercial airliner passed by in the sky, he said the sentence that would abruptly end their chances of an American career. While watching the plane go by he said: "Well, you never know in this country where they're heading, right?" The crowd gasped, but found some relief when he added: "But that one seems to be heading in the right direction." Thinking he meant the airport, the crowd gave a nervous laugh. But then Ola Salo added "The White House" to conclude the cheeky joke, and that joke was to cause much trouble.

The Washington Post reported the incident with the headline "A Swedish Star's Rock-and-Rile words". Back in Sweden, it became an even bigger scandal in the newspapers. The North American tour that was booked for the rest of the autumn became cancelled in its entirety, except for one last concert in New York. To a certain part, this was because some venues were receiving bomb threats. A contributing reason was that the band had not been able to get their new American working visas before travelling to Washington, which meant that they had already been planned to go back to Sweden and get this done. The main reason for cancelling the tour was that Ola Salo, who had quickly made an apology for the joke, was feeling totally burned out because of the scandal and was too tired to return. The concert at Bowery Ballroom in New York on November 20, 2006 was The Ark's final concert in the US.

=== Prayer for the Weekend (2007–2008) ===
On January 18, 2007 the band performed their new song "Absolutely No Decorum" at the radio gala P3 Guld in Gothenburg. It was their first new song since December 2004 and it was the first taste of the upcoming fourth album. The song promised a return to the bombastic sound from the band's early albums, and in interviews, the band said that the album was characteristically epic. The single became number-one on the famous radio show Tracks, where it ended up becoming the biggest hit of the year. Like "Trust Is Shareware" the song only had a digital release and no cd-single (apart from a promo version).

In February The Ark participated in Melodifestivalen, the Swedish preselection for the Eurovision Song Contest, which they won with their song The Worrying Kind (see below).

The album Prayer for the Weekend was released on April 11. The band was now on the new record label Roxy Recordings, and the album had been produced by Marco Manieri who also produced the debut in 2000. The album went to number one and stayed on the top 20 for many weeks.

In April the band made a celebrated club tour, and from June 16 to August 31 they made an intensive summer tour. During the summer, the title track of the album was released as the third single, with a music video. In September the tour continued across clubs in Europe, with Oskar Humblebo (MotoBoy) on guitar instead of Jepson who was on paternal leave. A total of more than 70 shows were performed during the year of 2007.

The album's fourth single was released on November 17, "Little Dysfunk You", and made a new Tracks record when it was the first song to make straight into the top 5 on the same day of its release.

On January 24, 2008 the band won the Swedish Rockbjörnen Award in the new category "Best live act of the year.

After the immense success of 2007, The Ark notified that they would not be active for a long period of time, and in 2008 they only played two concerts, one in Sundsvall, Sweden on July 4 and one at Ruisrock, Finland on July 5.

==== Melodifestivalen and Eurovision Song Contest ====
On December 26, 2006, Swedish TV revealed that The Ark were one of four acts invited to be jokers in Melodifestivalen. The Ark would later explain that they had taken the offer because Melodifestivalen is the biggest TV show in Sweden and they would be able to perform their new single to 4 million viewers, and since the show always dominated the media during the winter they would cheekily dominate the show and thereby dominate the media.

When Melodifestivalen started, The Ark participated with their song "The Worrying Kind" in the second heat at the Scandinavium arena in Gothenburg. They performed last and went straight to the final in Stockholm with 185,858 televotes. The final was held at Avicii Arena on March 10, where The Ark once again performed as the last song. They won the final with a total of 248 points, against the runner up's 189 points ("A Little Bit of Love" with Andreas Johnson). The Ark had received 492 180 televotes (against the runner up Måns Zelmerlöw with 402 133), which was a new voting record for the show, and 116 jury points (against the runner up Andreas Johnson's 101). After the victory there were some newspaper articles discussing the song's similarities with "Love Grows (Where My Rosemary Goes)" by Edison Lighthouse, and the songwriter Barry Mason made a comment that he was thinking of suing The Ark. This never happened.

On May 12 the band represented Sweden in the Eurovision Song Contest 2007 in Helsinki, where they ended on 18th place. The song was still a huge radio hit in Sweden, and The Ark became the first band in the history of the famous Swedish radio show Tracks to hold the number one and the number two spots of the charts with two of their songs at the same time, "The Worrying Kind" as number one and "Absolutely No Decorum" as number two.

=== Hiatus and country dreams (2008–2009) ===
After the massive success of 2007 The Ark announced that they would take a longer break from the band. In 2008 they only performed two concerts, one in Sundsvall, Sweden on the 4th of July and one at Provinssirock, Finland on July 5.

While planning for a fifth album Ola Salo had the idea of making a country record. After all the success as a rockstar he had entered a new phase of life, with a house in the countryside and no interest in repeating The Ark's earlier concepts. Though never a big fan of country, he had always loved the way the country guitars sounded. He had bought a Telecaster and some instruction books already during the tours of 2007 to make it his hobby in hotel rooms to practice country playing. Another hobby project was to listen to all the classical music from Gustav Mahler.

During a band meeting in 2008, the band talked about making the next album a grandiose rock record focusing on the styles of Prayer for the Weekend and State of the Ark. The problem was that Ola Salo had no such songs prepared, except "Superstar" that had already been suggested for the "Prayer"-record. Ola Salo went on a meditation trip to India, but the music that came to him was not the "Clamour For Glamour"-stompers the band had wished for, but simple country/folk-melodies that morphed into complicated symphonies. It was the mixture of country and Mahler that his subconscious mind had prepared for him. Among the early songs he came up with at this time were "Singing 'Bout the City" and "Hygiene Songs", but also songs that would never be released such as "Do Right To Me, Babe", "Take Me To The Doctor", "The Wonders of New Amsterdam" and "Hanuman." He found them to be fantastic songs, but they didn't sound like The Ark. His working title for The Ark's country-pop-album was "Zeitgeist For The Lame", which was a line taken from another new song called "The Leadership Void" that would never be released.

On May 8, 2009, Ola Salo invited the band to his home in order to present his vision of The Ark's upcoming psychedelic country/western-phase and the album Zeitgeist To The Lame. Leari and Sylvester Schlegel showed great joy to the idea, but Ola Salo felt that the larger part of the band was hesitant. The country idea was too far from The Ark's established style, and Ola Salo realised that he must return to the original idea of bombastic glam-rock for the fifth album.

Parts of Ola Salo's outlines and ideas for the never made Zeitgeist To The Lame album can be seen in the documentary "Ola Salo Svensson" made by Stefan Berg in 2009. In this documentary The Ark also perform parts of "Singing 'Bout the City".

=== In Full Regalia (2010) ===
In the autumn of 2009 the band revealed that they were working on their fifth album, after nearly three years of hiatus. Ola Salo had retrieved and updated the song "Superstar" that had been intended for "Prayer for the Weekend", and also "The Red Cap" which he had been working on earlier. He wrote more songs in the same style as these, and from songs such as "Singing 'Bout the City" survived from the "Zeitgeist To The Lame"-idea. When he played the majestic arena ballad "Stay With Me" to the band he noticed that they were relieved to recognize the classic style of The Ark.

On October 12, 2009, the recordings became in 9Voltstudio in Stockholm, with Fabian Torsson producing. The work was documented for the television documentary series "Dom kallar oss artister" on SVT and for the documentary series "Starka karaktärer" and TV3 (Sweden).

"Superstar" was premiered live on the talk show Skavlan on 26 March 2010, and the song was released as a single on March 29.

The album In Full Regalia was released on April 26, 2010, and sold gold in its first week. The CD was released with a magazine and was sold in magazine shops as well as the few remaining record stores. The idea was to battle dwindling record sales by reaching out to hundreds of more stores than just the record stores, since magazines were sold everywhere. But the idea was also to help recording costs by filling the magazine with commercials and to be able to be taxed with the smaller magazine tax. The Swedish Tax Agency did not accept the idea and in 2012 the publishing company for the magazine was ordered in court to pay the higher tax rates.

"In Full Regalia" was to be the only The Ark album to not result in any indoors touring. Instead, there was a Swedish festival tour with 21 concerts, including two in Finland. On June 29 the band appeared on the popular Swedish live show Allsång på Skansen, and on July 2 they did the first concert at the Peace & Love (festival). The tour ended in Linköping on August 21, followed by a short live appearance at the Rockbjörnen Music Awards in Stockholm on September 1.

"Stay With Me" was the album's second single, released by the end of May and as a digital download on June 7.

=== Arkeology and farewell tour (2011) ===
On December 8, 2010 The Ark announced that they would disband after the summer of 2011 and that there would be an extensive farewell tour. The decision was mutual and had grown out of the realisation that the band members did not want to repeat earlier concepts and that they spoke and thought of the band in a past tense. Especially Ola Salo was feeling that he rather spoke of the band with nostalgia as a fine memory, while plans for the future made him hesitant. In the autumn of 2010 he came to the realisation that The Ark had run its course. He realised that the reason for his fading ideas for new The Ark songs was because The Ark had already said everything they wanted to say. During a visit to New York in October 2010 he made the decision and e-mailed the band. At the same time, the rest of the members had been thinking the same and already talked to each other about quitting.

In early January 2011 the band released their new single "Breaking Up With God" and performed it live during the Swedish Grammy Awards at the Royal Swedish Opera on January 17. Along with the song "The Apocalypse Is Over" this was the last new music from The Ark, and the two songs were included on the best-of album Arkeology - The Complete Singles Collection that was released on February 23. On February 26 the band performed "Breaking Up With God" as the interval act of Melodifestivalen 2011 in Malmö Arena.

In the winter and spring the band did an extensive club tour, starting at Tavastia Club in Helsinki on March 3 and finishing in Milan, Italy on 12 May. During the club tour they performed a wide variety of songs from all their five albums.

Already on May 22, the farewell continued with a summer tour, both starting and finishing in Stockholm. During the summer concerts, they used a recording of the poem "The Ark" as their intro, the same poem that had given name and purpose to the band in 1991. On September 9 the band did their final club show in Helsingborg, with an extra-long setlist of 23 songs. About 50 shows were performed in this last year. Both the spring and the summer tour got very good reviews as well as sold-out shows, and the band once more received the Rockbjörnen Award for "Best Live Act". The Ark did their final TV appearance on July 2 at Gröna Lund on TV4 (Sweden) with the songs "The Apocalypse Is Over" and "It Takes A Fool To Remain Sane".

The final concert was played at Gröna Lund on September 16, 2011. The former band members Martin Rosengardten and Magnus Olsson took part during the song "Laurel Wreath". The concert was broadcast into space by use of radiowaves.

=== Reunion (2020–2021) ===
Ola Salo had played his residency show "Ola Salo's It Takes A Fool To Remain Sane" during 2019 and early 2020 in Gotheburg, Stockholm and on a short arena tour of Sweden, doing close to 150 shows. A new greatest hits collection was released on double vinyl for the show, and the rest of the band all attended the premiere in Gothenburg together on January 24, 2019. The show was about the journey of The Ark and was almost exclusively made up of the band's songs. During the song "The Worrying Kind", newly made video projections of all the band members were shown on stage.

On February 13, 2020, the band announced a reunion tour, meant to celebrate the 20th anniversary of the breakthrough and debut album. They announced that the reunion was only intended for a one-off tour in the summer of 2020, only focusing on the band's existing songs, and there would be no new music. The idea of a reunion had come already in 2017, when Ola Salo and Leari were talking about the fact that they had some big band anniversaries coming up. When they spoke to the rest of the band, it turned out that the feelings were mutual. The tour was named "The Ark Reunion Tour", and it was meant to premiere on Lollapalooza Stockholm festival on June 28. Because of the COVID-19 pandemic the tour was postponed to the summer of 2021, and the anniversary was changed to the 30 years since the band had formed.

The Ark made their first reunion performance on April 11, 2020, when playing "Calleth You, Cometh I" in an empty studio in Malmö during a televised charity gala on SVT in response to COVID-19. The studio they played in was the same studio where they recorded their debut album.

== Trivia ==
Expressen, a Swedish newspaper, once referred to Ola Salo and Jepson as two of the 10 most important personalities in Scandinavia.

"One of Us is Gonna Die Young" was used in the 2007 snowboarding video, "Picture This" from Mack Dawg Productions for Seth Huot and Andreas Wiig's video part, also was it used for the Sam Blenkinsop and Philip Polc Section of the FOX Racing Shox 2007 sequel.

"Let Your Body Decide" was used in the 2010 film Super starring Rainn Wilson and Elliot Page.

Omar Rudberg sang a cover version of "It Takes a Fool to Remain Sane" for the Netflix show Young Royals. He also released it as a single in 2021.

== Members ==
- Ola Salo: vocals, piano, percussion, rhythm guitar and songwriting (1991–2011, 2020–present)
- Mikael Jepson: lead guitar (1991–2011, 2020–present)
- Lars "Leari" Ljungberg: bass, backing vocals (1991–2011, 2020–present)
- Martin Axén: rhythm guitar, backing vocals (1997–2011, 2020–present)
- Sylvester Schlegel: drums, backing vocals (1999–2011, 2020–present)
- Jens Andersson: keyboards, sound engineering (2006–2011, 2020–present)

== Former members ==
- Magnus Olsson: drums (1991–1992)
- Martin Rosengardten: drums (1992–1999)

== Touring members ==
- Jens Andersson: keyboards, sound engineering (2001–2006)
- Nicklas Stenemo: keyboards (2000).

== Discography ==
=== Albums ===
Year	Album details	Peak chart positions			
Year	Album details	SWE	NOR	FIN	ITA
2000	We Are the Ark: Released: September 25, 2000; Label: Virgin Records	1	—	—	32
2002	In Lust We Trust: Released: August 26, 2002; Label: Virgin Records	1	18	—	24
2004	State of The Ark: Released: December 27, 2004; Label: Virgin Records	1	—	8	—
2007	Prayer for the Weekend: Released: April 11, 2007; Label: Roxy Recordings	1	—	3	—
2010	In Full Regalia: Released: April 26, 2010; Label: Ark Records/Universal	2	—	12	—
2011	Arkeology: The Complete Singles Collection: Released: February 23, 2011; Label: Ark Records/Universal	3	—	—	—
2019	It Takes a Fool to Remain Sane (2000–2011): Released: February 1, 2019; Label: Telegram/Dolores	51	—	—	—
"—" denotes releases that did not chart.

=== Extended plays ===
- The Ark (The debut EP is sometimes referred to as Racing with the Rabbits) - 1996

=== Singles ===
Year	Title	Album	Peak chart positions					
Year	Title	Album	SWE	SWE Tracks	SWE Svensk toppen	ITA	GER	UK
2000	"Let Your Body Decide"	We Are the Ark	—	9	—	—	—	—
2000	"It Takes a Fool to Remain Sane"	We Are the Ark	7	1	—	4	—	—
2000	"Echo Chamber"	We Are the Ark	42	7	—	—	—	—
2001	"Joy Surrender"	We Are the Ark	23	3	—	—	—	—
2002	"Let Your Body Decide" (International Version)	We Are the Ark	59	—	—	15	—	—
2002	"Calleth You, Cometh I"	In Lust We Trust	2	1	—	10	—	—
2002	"Father of a Son"	In Lust We Trust	5	2	—	—	—	—
2002	"Tell Me This Night Is Over"	In Lust We Trust	28	5	10	—	—	—
2003	"Disease"	In Lust We Trust	—	5	12	—	—	—
2004	"One of Us Is Gonna Die Young"	State of the Ark	4	1	6	—	—	—
2005	"Clamour for Glamour"	State of the Ark	10	3	13	—	—	—
2005	"Trust Is Shareware"	State of the Ark	—	11	11	—	—	—
2005	"Deliver Us from Free Will" ^{[P]}	State of the Ark	—	—	—	—	—	—
2007	"Absolutely No Decorum"	Prayer for the Weekend	26	1	4	—	—	—
2007	"The Worrying Kind"	Prayer for the Weekend	1	1	1	34	99	121
2007	"Gimme Love to Give" ^{[D]}	Prayer for the Weekend	56	—	—	—	—	—
2007	"Prayer for the Weekend"	Prayer for the Weekend	15	3	3	32	—	—
2007	"Little Dysfunk You"	Prayer for the Weekend	58	2	9	—	—	—
2010	"Superstar"	In Full Regalia	33	2	9	—	—	—
2010	"Stay with Me"	In Full Regalia	—	—	—	—	—	—
2011	"Breaking Up with God"	Arkeology	—	—	3	—	—	—
2011	"The Apocalypse Is Over"	Arkeology	—	—	—	—	—	—
2025	"Stronger Than"	Non-album Single	—	—	—	—	—	—
2026	"Give And Take"	Non-album Single	—	—	—	—	—	—
"—" denotes releases that did not chart.

Notes

- P "Deliver Us from Free Will" was only released as a promo single for International use.
- D "Gimme Love To Give" wasn't released as a single as such but charted on the Swedish Singles Chart due to the large amount of digital sales of the album track.

=== Music videos ===
Title	Director(s)	Date
"Flower King"	Stefan Berg	1994
"It Takes a Fool to Remain Sane"	Magnus Rösman	2000
"Echo Chamber"	Johan Perjus	2000
"Joy Surrender"	Markus Johnson	2001
"Let Your Body Decide"	Mikeadelica	2001
"Calleth You, Cometh I" (Swedish version)	?	2002
"Calleth You, Cometh I" (international version)	Amir Chamdin	2002
"Father of a Son"	Amir Chamdin	August 2002
"Tell Me This Night Is Over"	Amir Chamdin	2002
"One of Us is Gonna Die Young" (Swedish version)	RBG6	November 20, 2004
"Clamour for Glamour"	RBG6	March 14, 2005
"One of Us is Gonna Die Young" (international version)	Magnus Rösman	June 2006
"The Worrying Kind"	Magnus Rösman	April 2007
"Prayer for the Weekend"	Magnus Renfors	June 2007
"Superstar"	?	April 2010
"Pantamera"	?	Juni 2011

Preceded by Carola	Sweden in the Eurovision Song Contest; 2007	Succeeded by Charlotte Perrelli
