= The Ark (EP) =

EP by the Ark
- Released: 1996
- Recorded: April 1994 and March 1995
- Genre: Rock
- Label: Beat That!
- Producer: Stefan Bergh, Joakim Täck, The Ark

The Ark chronology
The Ark (1996)	We Are the Ark (2000)

Professional ratings
Review scores
Source	Rating
Allmusic	2/5 stars

The Ark (sometimes referred to by the first track from the EP Racing with the Rabbits) is the debut EP of the Swedish band the Ark.

== Track listing ==
#	Title	Songwriters	Producer(s)	Length
1	"Racing with the Rabbits"	Lyrics: O. Svensson, Music: The Ark	Stefan Bergh	5:05
2	"I Laid It Down"	Lyrics: O. Svensson, Music: The Ark	Joakim Täck, The Ark	4:24
3	"Cracked Messiah"	Lyrics: O. Svensson, Music: The Ark	Stefan Bergh	4:21
4	"Od Slatrom Ekil"	Lyrics: O. Svensson, Music: The Ark	Joakim Täck, The Ark	9:46

== Personnel ==
- Ola Svensson - vocals
- Lars Ljungberg - bass
- Mikael Jepson - guitars
- Martin Rosengardten - drums

Additional musicians:

- Mats Andersson - violin
- Erik Persson - violin
- Tanja Nielsen - cello
- Britta Svedskog - bassoon
- Krister Miller - clarinet

It is also possible that Salo/Svensson played guitar for the EP due to him playing guitar at then-contemporary gigs (sometimes keyboards) but since there is no personnel list for this release (only for additional musicians) the contributions are merely speculation based on blogs made by the Ark themselves.
