= Henrik Morén =

Swedish cyclist

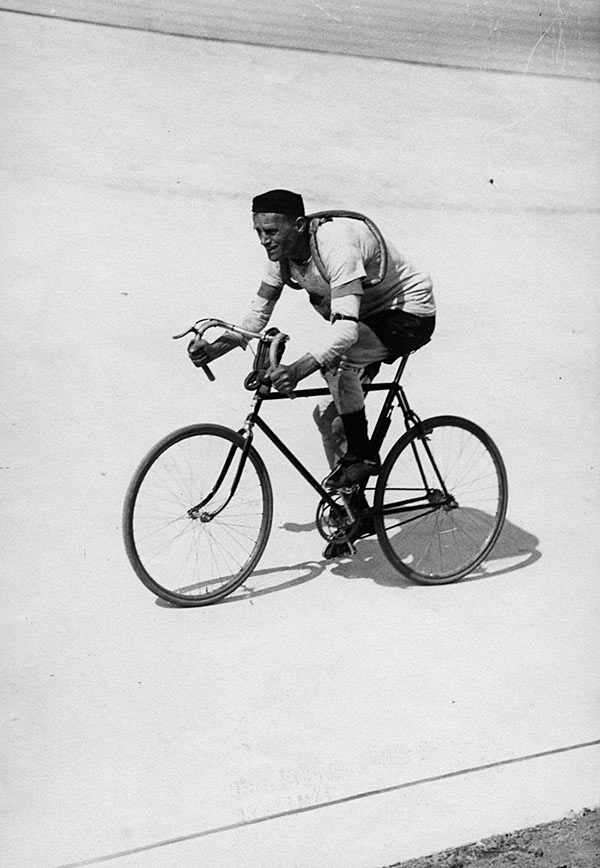
- Henrik Morén in 1923

Personal information
- Born: 5 January 1887 Tävelsås, Sweden
- Died: 31 January 1956 (aged 69) Stockholm, Sweden

Cycling career
- Sport: Cycling

Henrik Morén (5 January 1887 – 31 January 1956) was a Swedish cyclist. He competed in two events at the 1912 Summer Olympics.
