= ESC Youth League =

European sport shooting league

- Current season, competition or edition: 2009 ESC Youth League
- Sport: Air rifle and air pistol
- Founded: 2009
- Founder: European Shooting Confederation
- No. of teams: Max. 15
- Country: Europe
- Most recent champions: Serbia (rifle); Spain (pistol)
- Qualification: In three regions
- Website: esc-shooting.org

The ESC Youth League (also European Youth League) is a shooting competition for national teams composed of shooters between 14 and 18 years of age. It was created by the European Shooting Confederation in preparation for the 2010 Youth Olympic Games, and has its premiere season in 2009.

There are two classes: 10 metre air rifle (40 shots) and 10 metre air pistol (40 shots). In both competitions, a team comprises three shooters, regardless of gender, for each match although the teams are free to switch shooters between matches.

== League format ==
The division of Europe into ESC Youth League regions

For the competition, Europe is divided into three regions: Eastern, Northern and Western. In each of the regions, all federations who want to participate administer a preliminary 40-shot round for their own teams and submit the results to the ESC. The preliminary rounds may also be held by several federations in cooperation, often in conjunction with other major international competitions; in either case, they are supervised by an appointed ISSF judge.

The top five teams in each region compete in the regional qualification group, which is a round-robin tournament where the teams pair up their shooters according to previous results in a manner similar to that of the German Bundesliga. Shooters who win each pair scores one point for their team. Any ties after 40 shots are broken by a shot-by-shot shootoff. The final ranking is based on the number of won matches, and if there is a tie by the number of individual points won.

The teams finishing first and second in their regional groups qualify for the ESC Youth League Finals, where the six teams are divided into two groups of three teams each for a new round-robin. The group winners advance to the final, carried out after the group runners-up have matched up for the bronze medal.

== Winners ==
=== 10 metre air rifle ===
Year	Final venue	Gold	Silver	Bronze
2009	(Denmark) Helsingør	Serbia	Croatia	Hungary

=== 10 metre air pistol ===
Year	Final venue	Gold	Silver	Bronze
2009	(Denmark) Helsingør	Spain	Poland	Russia
