= Furuby =

- Location within Kronoberg Location within Sweden
- Coordinates: 56°51′13″N 15°01′56″E
- Country: Sweden
- Province: Småland
- County: Kronoberg County
- Municipality: Växjö Municipality

Area
  - Total: 0.60 km^{2} (0.23 sq mi)

Population (31 December 2010)
  - Total: 372
  - Density: 621/km^{2} (1,610/sq mi)
- Time zone: UTC+1 (CET)
  - Summer (DST): UTC+2 (CEST)

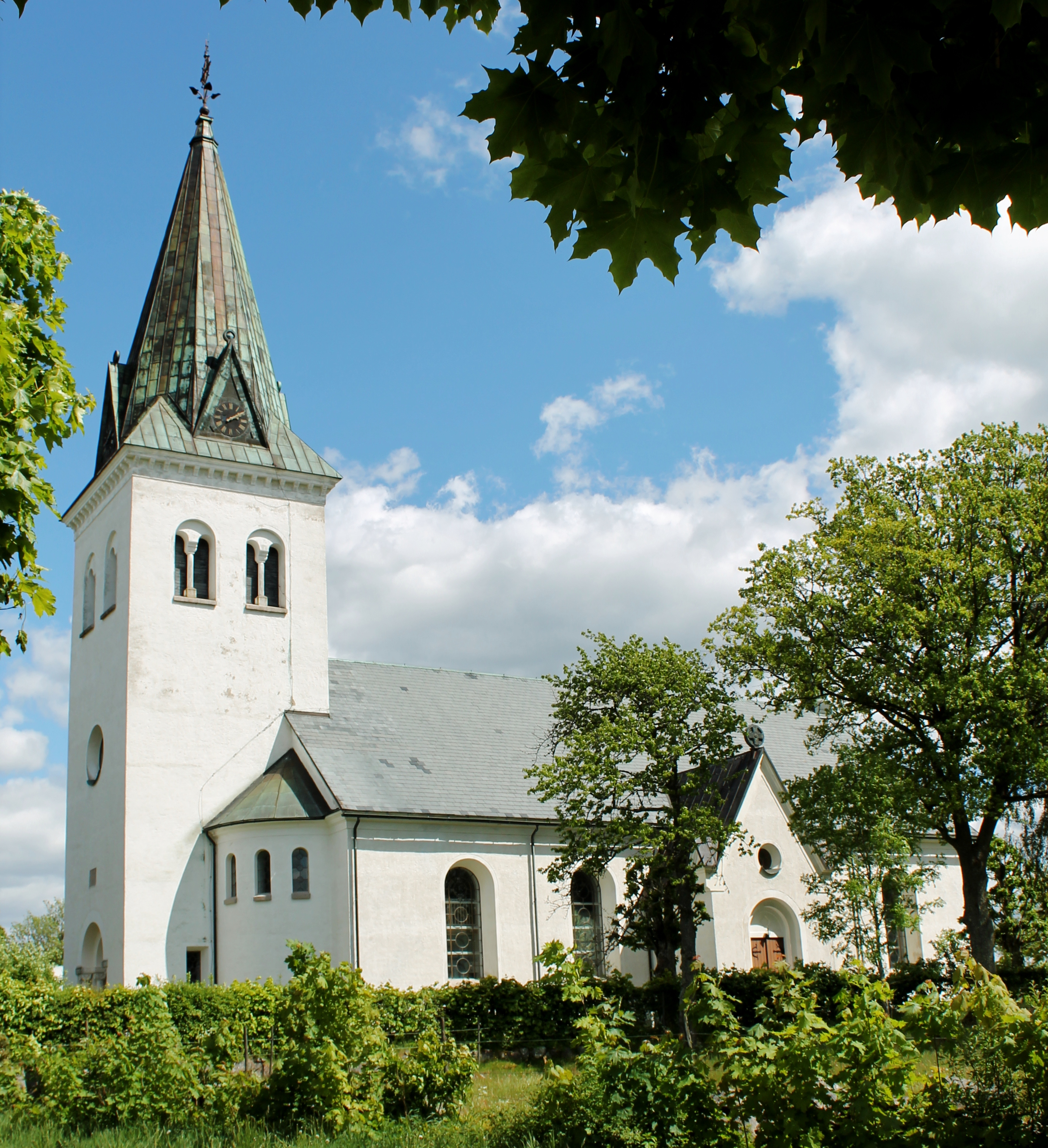

Furuby is a locality situated in Växjö Municipality, Kronoberg County, Sweden with 372 inhabitants in 2010.
