= Nöbbele =

- Location within Kronoberg Location within Sweden
- Coordinates: 56°41′N 15°01′E
- Country: Sweden
- Province: Småland
- County: Kronoberg County
- Municipality: Växjö Municipality

Area
  - Total: 0.56 km^{2} (0.22 sq mi)

Population (31 December 2010)
  - Total: 257
  - Density: 459/km^{2} (1,190/sq mi)
- Time zone: UTC+1 (CET)
  - Summer (DST): UTC+2 (CEST)

Nöbbele is a locality situated in Växjö Municipality, Kronoberg County, Sweden with 257 inhabitants in 2010. It is the hometown of famous Swedish rally driver Anders Karlsson.

== Sister cities ==
- (United States) Shafer - Minnesota, USA
