= Ingelstad =

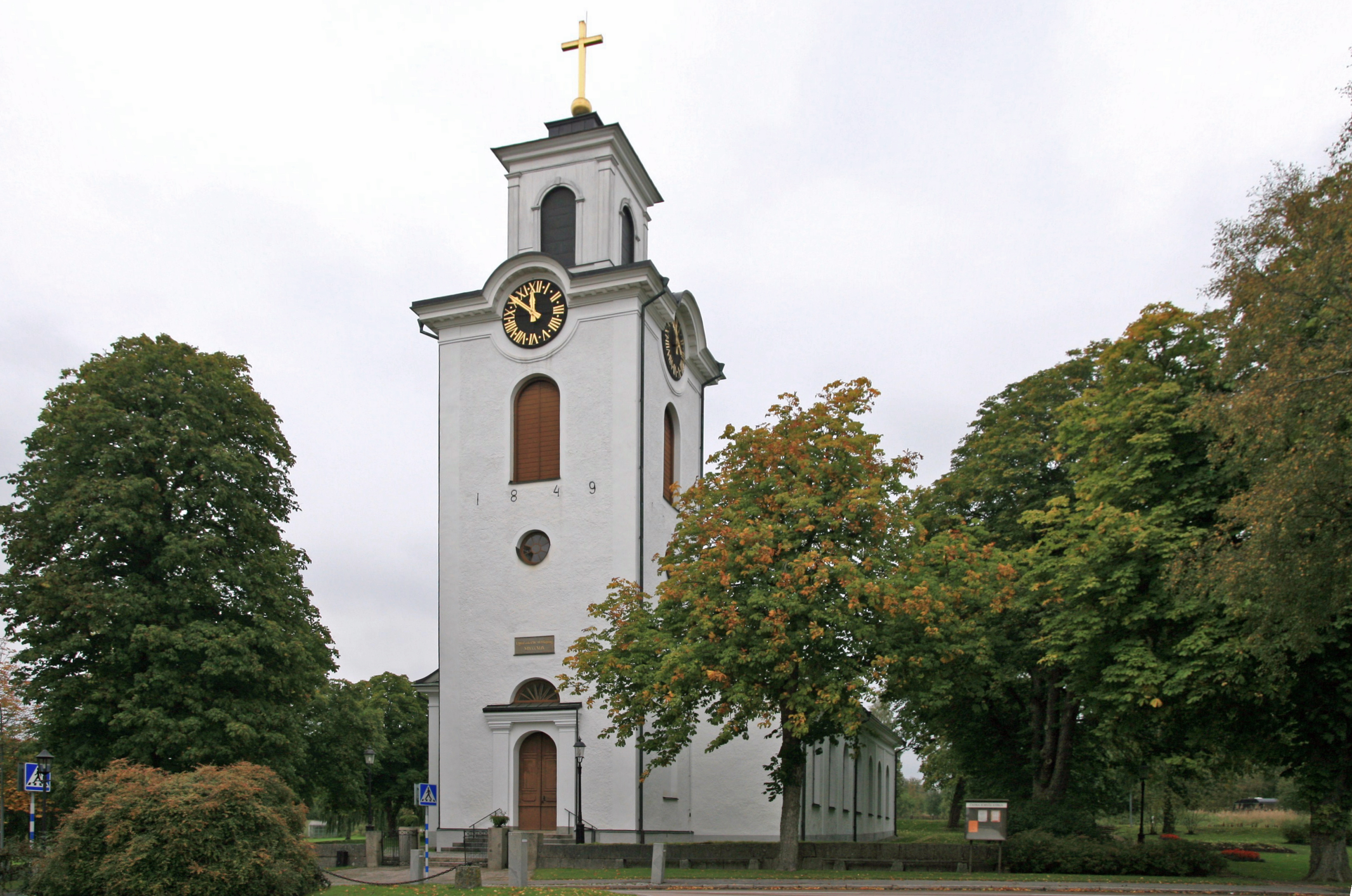
- Östra Torsås Church

- Location within Kronoberg Location within Sweden
- Coordinates: 56°45′N 14°55′E
- Country: Sweden
- Province: Småland
- County: Kronoberg County
- Municipality: Växjö Municipality

Area
  - Total: 2.11 km^{2} (0.81 sq mi)

Population (31 December 2010)
  - Total: 1,674
  - Density: 794/km^{2} (2,060/sq mi)
- Time zone: UTC+1 (CET)
  - Summer (DST): UTC+2 (CEST)

Ingelstad is a locality situated in Växjö Municipality, Kronoberg County, Sweden with 1,674 inhabitants in 2010.

Ingelstad may also refer to Ingelstad Hundred, located in the province of Skåne.
