= It Takes a Fool to Remain Sane =

2000 single by the Ark

Single by The Ark

from the album We Are the Ark
- Released: 2000
- Genre: Glam rock; symphonic rock
- Songwriter(s): Ola Salo

The Ark singles chronology
"Let Your Body Decide" (2000)	"It Takes a Fool to Remain Sane" (2000)	"Echo Chamber" (2000)

"It Takes a Fool to Remain Sane" is a song recorded and performed by Swedish rock band The Ark, published as the second single of their debut studio album We Are the Ark, released in 2000. It was a hit in Sweden and Italy. The song was also awarded a Grammis for being the "song of the year".

== Track listing ==
1. "It Takes a Fool to Remain Sane" – 3:56
2. "The Homecomer" – 5:28

== Charts ==
Chart (2000–2001)	Peak position
Italy (Federazione Industria Musicale Italiana)	4
Sweden (Sverigetopplistan)	7

== Covers ==
Omar Rudberg sang a cover version for the Netflix show Young Royals. He also released it as a single in 2021.

In April 2023, Cornelia Jakobs, a Swedish singer who competed in the 2022 Eurovision Song Contest, released a cover version. Jakobs' cover peaked no. 83 in Sweden.
