= In Lust We Trust =

Studio album by the Ark
- Released: 26 August 2002
- Recorded: Polar Studios, Sandovie Studios, Jailhouse Studios and 9-Volt Studios
- Genre: Rock
- Length: 44:06
- Label: Virgin Records
- Producer: Peter Kvint

The Ark chronology
We Are the Ark (2000)	In Lust We Trust (2002)	State of The Ark (2004)

Singles from In Lust We Trust
- 1. "Calleth You Cometh I" Released: 2002; 2. "Father of a Son" Released: 2002; 3. "Tell Me This Night Is Over" Released: 2002; 4. "Disease" Released: 2003

Professional ratings
Review scores
Source	Rating
Allmusic	link

In Lust We Trust is the second album by Swedish glam rock band the Ark, released on 26 August 2002. Four singles were released from the album: "Calleth You, Cometh I", "Father of a Son", "Tell Me This Night Is Over" and "Disease".

== Track listing ==
All songs written by Ola Salo, except where noted.

1. "Beauty Is the Beast" – 3:38
2. "Father of a Son" – 3:22
3. "Tell Me This Night Is Over" – 5:15
4. "Calleth You, Cometh I" (Ola Salo, Peter Kvint) – 4:32
5. "A Virgin like You" – 4:31
6. "Interlude" (Lars "Leari" Ljungberg) – 1:07
7. "Tired of Being an Object?" – 2:43
8. "Disease" – 3:16
9. "Vendelay" – 3:22
10. "2000 Light-Years of Darkness" – 7:02
11. "The Most Radical Thing to Do" – 4:11
- The gap between the last two tracks contains a hidden instrumental, around a minute long string introduction to "The Most Radical Thing to Do"
- Backing vocals by: Helena Josefsson, Gladys Del Pilar, Paris Gilbert, Pelle Ankarberg and Sara Isaksson

== Personnel ==
The Ark are:

- Ola Salo – lead vocals, background vocals, piano, percussion, primary songwriting
- Martin Axén – rhythm guitar, backing vocals
- Mikael Jepson – lead guitar
- Leari Lars Ljungberg – bass, backing vocals
- Sylvester Schlegel – drums, backing vocals

== Charts ==
=== Weekly charts ===
Chart (2002)	Peak position
Italian Albums (FIMI)	24
Norwegian Albums (VG-lista)	18
Swedish Albums (Sverigetopplistan)	1

=== Year-end charts ===
Chart (2002)	Position
Swedish Albums (Sverigetopplistan)	25
