= The Worrying Kind =

2007 single by The Ark

Single by the Ark

from the album Prayer for the Weekend
- Released: 5 March 2007
- Recorded: 2007
- Genre: Glam Rock
- Length: 2:56
- Songwriter: Ola Salo

Eurovision Song Contest 2007 entry
- Country: Sweden
- Artists: Ola Salo; Lars Ljungberg; Mikael Jepson; Sylvester Schlegel; Martin Axén; Jens Andersson
- As: The Ark
- Language: English
- Composer: Ola Salo
- Lyricist: Ola Salo

Finals performance
- Final result: 18th
- Final points: 51

Entry chronology
- ◄ "Invincible" (2006)
- "Hero" (2008) ►

"The Worrying Kind" is a rock song performed by the Ark, written and composed by Ola Salo. It was released as the second single from their fourth album, Prayer for the Weekend. On 10 March 2007, the song won Melodifestivalen 2007, becoming Sweden's Eurovision Song Contest 2007 entry. The song won both the jury and public vote.

The song includes the verse "just a mortal with potential of a superman", taken from the 1971 David Bowie song "Quicksand". Similarities have also been drawn with the 1970 Edison Lighthouse one-hit-wonder "Love Grows (Where My Rosemary Goes)". The song was directly qualified for the Final of Eurovision Song Contest, held in Helsinki on 12 May, due to Carola Häggkvist's fifth-place finish in the 2006 contest with "Invincible". In the finals, the song received 51 points and finished 18th of 24 finalists. It received votes from six countries: 12 points from Denmark and Norway, 10 from Iceland, 8 from Finland, 7 from the United Kingdom, and 2 from Andorra.

== Melodifestivalen and the Eurovision Song Contest ==
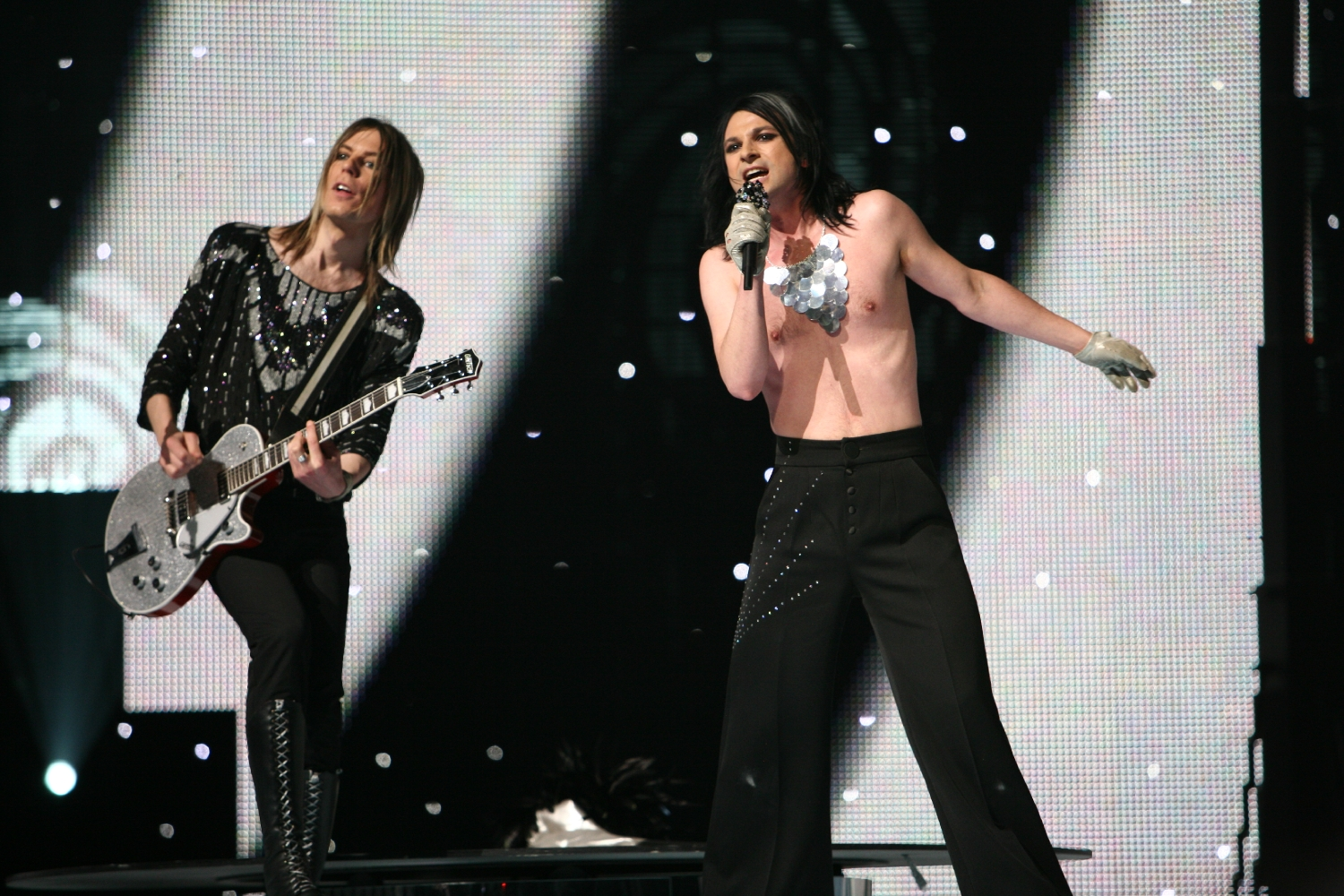
The Ark performing "The Worrying Kind" at the Eurovision Song Contest.

"The Worrying Kind" participated in the second heat of the 2007 Melodifestivalen which was held on 10 February 2007 at the Scandinavium indoor arena in Gothenburg. The song was the last of the eight competing entries to perform and directly qualified to the contest final as one of the two songs which received the most telephone votes. On 10 March, during the final held at the Globe Arena in Stockholm, the Ark were the last of the ten competing acts to perform, and "The Worrying Kind" won the contest with 248 points, receiving the highest number of votes from the regional juries and the viewing public via telephone voting.

Sweden automatically qualified to the final of the 2007 Eurovision Song Contest in Helsinki, Finland courtesy of its 5th place finish at the previous year's contest. "The Worrying Kind" was performed in the final on 21 May 2007, with Sweden drawn to perform in twelfth position of the 24 competing entries. The Ark subsequently finished in eighteenth place, receiving 51 points in total, including the maximum 12 points from Denmark and Norway.

== Chart performance ==
The song held the top spot on the Swedish singles chart for a total of three weeks. It also entered Svensktoppen on 15 April 2007 at #3 and reached the #1 spot on 29 April 2007.

A cover version by Maia Hirasawa was also at Svensktoppen between 11 May-7 September 2008, peaking at #2.

=== Weekly charts ===
Chart (2007)	Peak position
European Hot 100 Singles	92
Germany (GfK)	99
Italy (FIMI)	34
Sweden (Sverigetopplistan)	1
UK Singles (Official Charts Company)	121

=== Year-end charts ===
Chart (2007)	Position
Sweden (Sverigetopplistan)	2
