= We Are the Ark =

Studio album by The Ark
- Released: 25 September 2000
- Genre: Glam rock
- Length: 46:36
- Label: Virgin
- Producer: Marco Manieri, The Ark

The Ark chronology
The Ark (1996)	We Are the Ark (2000)	In Lust We Trust (2002)

Singles from We Are The Ark
- 1. "Let Your Body Decide (first release)" Released: 2000; 2. "It Takes a Fool to Remain Sane" Released: 2000; 3. "Echo Chamber" Released: 2000; 4. "Joy Surrender" Released: 2001; 5. "Let Your Body Decide (re-release)" Released: 2002

Professional ratings
Review scores
Source	Rating
Allmusic	4/5 stars

We Are the Ark was released on 25 September 2000 and is the debut studio album from Swedish glam rock group The Ark. The album was both a critical and commercial success, spawning four singles.

== Track listing ==
All songs were written by Ola Salo.

1. "Hey Modern Days" – 3:50
2. "Echo Chamber" – 3:39
3. "Joy Surrender" – 3:55
4. "It Takes a Fool to Remain Sane" – 4:10
5. "Ain't Too Proud to Bow" – 3:31
6. "Bottleneck Barbiturate" – 4:57
7. "Let Your Body Decide" – 3:13
8. "Patchouli" – 2:33
9. "This Sad Bouquet" – 5:02
10. "Angelheads" – 3:21
11. "Laurel Wreath" – 3:44
12. "You, Who Stole My Solitude" – 5:01

== Personnel ==
- Ola Salo – lead vocals, piano, keyboards, percussion
- Martin Axén – rhythm guitar, backing vocals
- Mikael Jepson – lead guitar
- Leari Ljunberg – bass, backing vocals
- Sylvester Schlegel – drums, backing vocals

== Singles ==
- "Let Your Body Decide" (twice)
- "It Takes a Fool to Remain Sane"
- "Joy Surrender"
- "Echo Chamber"

== Charts ==
Chart (2000–2001)	Peak position
Sweden (Sverigetopplistan)	1
