= Tävelsås =

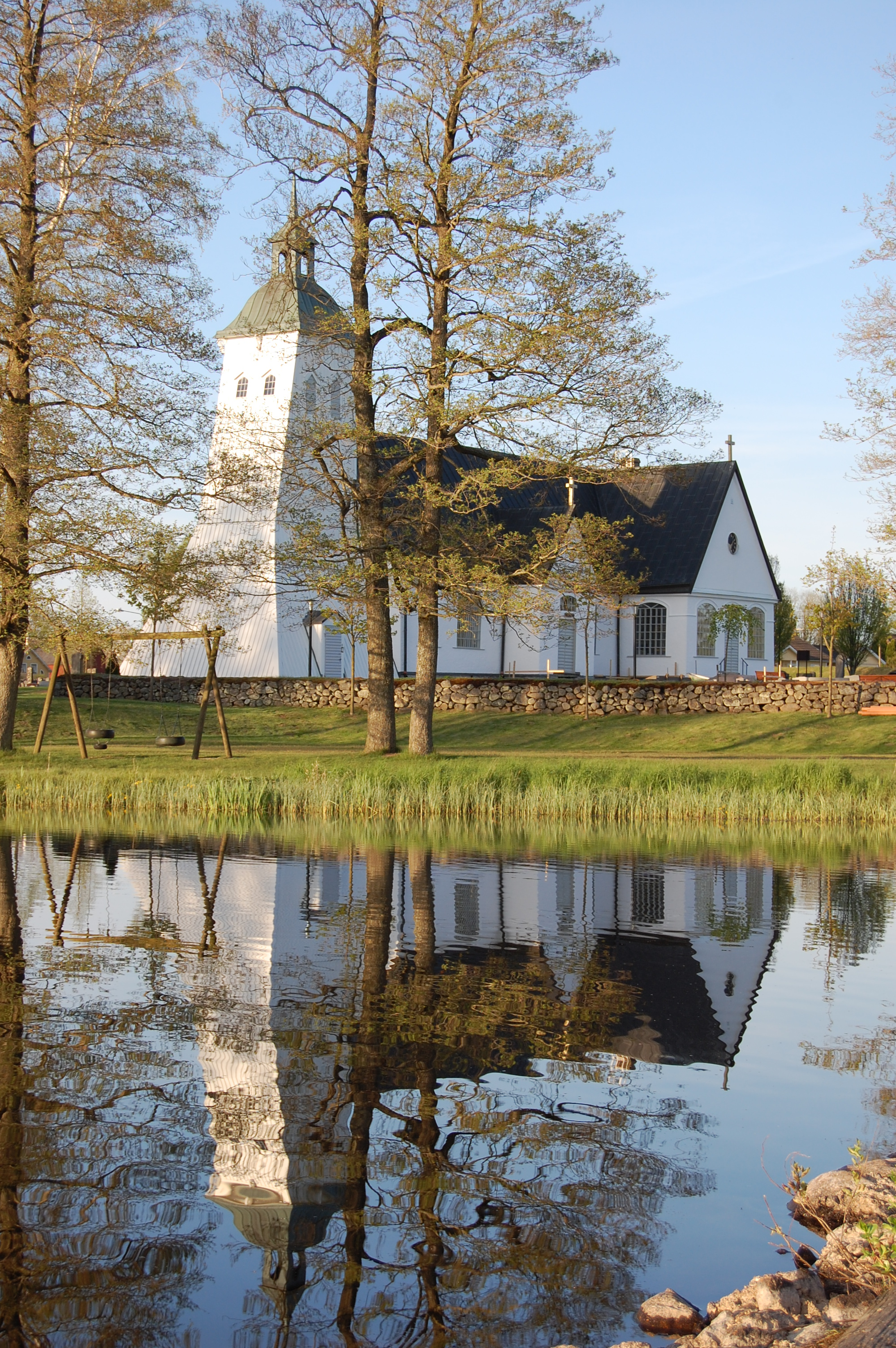
- Tävelsås church

- Location within Kronoberg Location within Sweden
- Coordinates: 56°46′07″N 14°49′25″E
- Country: Sweden
- Province: Småland
- County: Kronoberg County
- Municipality: Växjö Municipality

Area
  - Total: 0.35 km^{2} (0.14 sq mi)

Population (31 December 2010)
  - Total: 225
  - Density: 639/km^{2} (1,660/sq mi)
- Time zone: UTC+1 (CET)
  - Summer (DST): UTC+2 (CEST)

Tävelsås is a locality situated in Växjö Municipality, Kronoberg County, Sweden with 225 inhabitants in 2010.
