= Växjö Municipality =

Växjö Municipality Växjö kommun
- Municipality
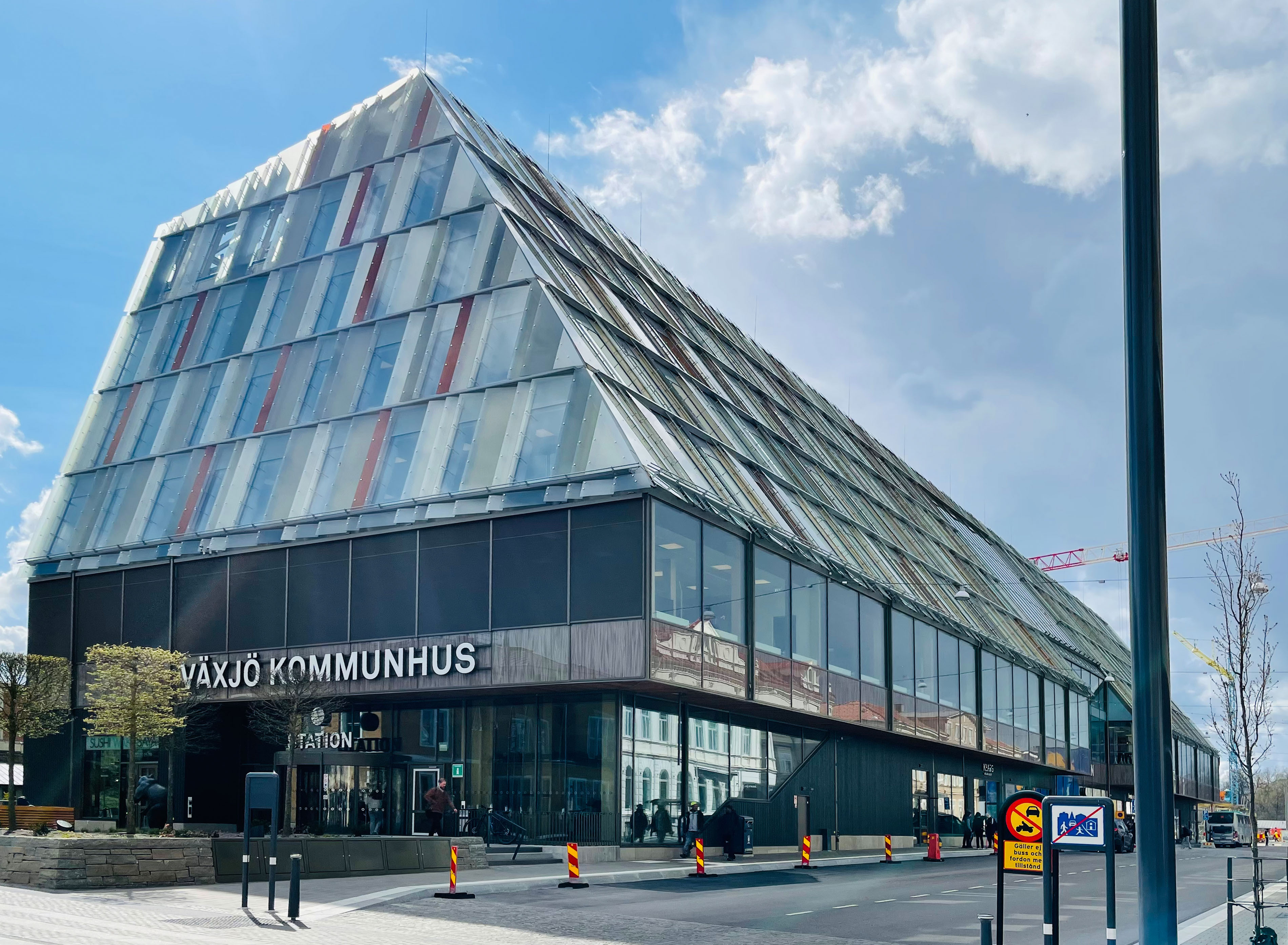
- Växjö Railway Station And City Hall

- Coat of arms

- Coordinates: 56°53′N 14°48′E
- Country: Sweden
- County: Kronoberg County
- Established: 1971
- Seat: Växjö

Area
  - Total: 1,914.25 km^{2} (739.10 sq mi)
  - Land: 1,665.51 km^{2} (643.06 sq mi)
  - Water: 248.74 km^{2} (96.04 sq mi)
- Area as of 1 January 2014.

Population (30 June 2025)
  - Total: 98,072
  - Density: 58.884/km^{2} (152.51/sq mi)
- Time zone: UTC+1 (CET)
  - Summer (DST): UTC+2 (CEST)
- Postal code: 35002 - 35597
- ISO 3166 code: SE
- Province: Småland
- Municipal code: 0780
- Website: www.vaxjo.se

Växjö Municipality (Swedish: Växjö kommun) is a municipality in Kronoberg County in southern Sweden, where Växjö is the seat.

The municipality was created in 1971 by the amalgamation of the City of Växjö with the surrounding municipalities. The number of original local government entities (as of 1863) included in the present municipality is 29.

== Localities ==
There are 12 urban areas (also called a Tätort or locality) in the City of Växjö.

In the table the localities are listed according to the size of the population as of December 31, 2006. The municipal seat is in bold characters.

#	Locality	Population
1	**Växjö**	66,275
2	Rottne	2,240
3	Lammhult	1,781
4	Ingelstad	1,667
5	Braås	1,608
6	Gemla	1,498
7	Åryd	671
8	Åby	447
9	Furuby	349
10	Nöbbele	244
11	Tävelsås	225

== Demographics ==
This is a demographic table based on Växjö Municipality's electoral districts in the 2022 Swedish general election sourced from SVT's election platform, in turn taken from SCB official statistics.

In total there were 95,780 residents, including 70,824 Swedish citizens of voting age. 49.4% voted for the left coalition and 49.1% for the right coalition. Indicators are in percentage points except population totals and income.

Location	Residents	Citizen adults	Left vote	Right vote	Employed	Swedish parents	Foreign heritage	Income SEK	Degree
Location			%	%					
Araby	2,089	1,294	71.3	21.3	55	18	82	15,244	27
Arenastaden	1,088	827	49.3	49.1	83	56	44	26,330	41
Berg	1,041	809	46.1	53.1	90	94	6	27,692	48
Bergunda	1,262	988	41.4	57.9	89	82	18	28,820	47
Braås	2,381	1,632	51.2	47.7	76	70	30	22,265	29
Bäckaslöv	1,306	1,150	47.4	51.5	83	83	17	28,319	54
Centrum	1,462	1,295	44.0	54.8	83	82	18	27,057	52
Dalbo C	2,231	1,214	71.5	20.7	54	19	81	14,145	28
Dädesjö	615	462	44.7	52.3	91	93	7	27,367	43
Fagrabäck	1,584	1,291	52.2	46.5	80	78	22	25,854	54
Furuby	756	549	43.5	55.7	89	91	9	27,716	43
Furutå	1,910	1,463	52.5	46.9	83	75	25	28,104	66
Gamla Hovshaga	1,693	1,275	47.6	52.0	85	82	18	30,219	58
Gemla	1,886	1,353	49.7	49.5	87	89	11	27,771	45
Hov	2,069	1,559	53.7	45.7	90	83	17	29,736	53
Hovshaga C	1,948	1,491	51.3	46.8	81	67	33	25,853	40
Högstorp-Hollstorp	2,208	1,624	47.8	51.9	89	90	10	32,490	62
Ingelstad	2,411	1,794	47.0	52.2	84	89	11	25,507	44
Kampen-Sigfrid	1,469	1,244	52.4	45.5	78	77	23	26,604	58
Kronoberg	2,165	1,497	44.6	55.1	89	84	16	33,733	63
Kungsmad	1,896	1,447	43.3	53.5	79	72	28	28,547	57
Kvarnhagen	1,859	1,324	50.9	47.1	79	69	31	25,052	37
Lammhult	2,371	1,575	36.8	61.4	73	71	29	21,803	26
Lasarettet	1,722	1,510	45.5	53.8	87	83	17	29,931	60
Liedsbergsgatan	1,913	1,439	57.2	39.7	67	42	58	18,812	39
Ljungfälle-Teleborg	1,860	1,289	56.2	41.7	69	59	41	22,094	47
Norr	1,429	1,128	51.9	47.6	87	92	8	30,788	56
Norrelid	1,136	1,064	54.4	45.0	86	86	14	26,985	57
Nya Hovshaga	2,185	1,635	52.9	45.4	88	81	19	28,084	47
Nydala	2,283	1,240	70.1	20.0	59	21	79	15,639	30
Pilbäcken	2,002	1,386	62.5	34.4	71	43	57	20,974	35
Ringsberg	1,541	1,383	53.4	45.3	79	82	18	25,327	48
Rottne N	1,237	855	39.8	58.7	83	79	21	25,771	33
Rottne S	1,724	1,265	42.1	56.8	84	84	16	24,227	34
Sandsbro V	2,983	1,563	46.9	52.6	88	87	13	30,647	58
Sandsbro Ö	2,395	1,736	44.9	54.2	90	91	9	30,637	51
Stallvägen	1,580	870	53.4	46.4	33	48	52	3,687	78
Söder	1,866	1,408	51.2	47.3	87	85	15	32,961	67
Teknikum	1,352	1,049	64.3	34.4	76	68	32	23,189	45
Teleborg C	1,948	1,410	62.1	35.6	61	49	51	17,794	43
Teleborg S	1,874	1,415	48.8	51.0	84	82	18	28,965	63
Torparängen	1,781	1,388	60.0	39.2	80	74	26	25,353	56
Tävelsås-Uråsa	1,705	1,219	45.3	53.2	90	91	9	28,101	48
Ulriksberg	1,999	1,438	44.7	54.8	87	81	19	30,643	61
Universitetet N	1,456	1,214	47.6	51.5	49	73	27	9,744	76
Universitetet S	1,282	897	49.5	48.4	31	59	41	4,894	73
Vederslöv	1,571	1,197	40.7	58.7	90	94	6	28,082	43
Vikaholm	1,671	1,199	51.5	47.7	87	67	33	29,372	63
Värends Nöbbele	686	504	45.0	54.1	88	94	6	26,427	35
Väster	1,764	1,511	44.3	54.2	86	86	14	28,301	51
Åby	1,422	1,031	42.5	56.2	90	90	10	28,058	44
Åryd	1,639	1,171	43.9	54.8	88	88	12	28,414	41
Öjaby N	1,365	1,005	38.1	61.1	91	93	7	32,372	56
Öjaby S-Räppe	2,063	1,505	39.9	59.5	87	87	13	30,164	49
Öster	1,572	1,355	48.2	50.1	82	85	15	27,140	56
Östra Lugnet	2,074	1,388	45.4	54.1	90	81	19	32,059	58
Source: SVT

== Economy ==
Largest employers in the municipality:

1. Växjö Municipality 7,400
2. Kronoberg County Administrative Board 4,000
3. Linnaeus University 1,000
4. Volvo Construction Equipment 800
5. SAAB/Combitech 340
6. Atea 300
7. Alstom Power 300
8. Visma SPCS 300
9. Rottne Industri AB 250
10. Södra Skogsägarna 230
11. Getinge Disinfection 230
12. Boss Media 210
13. Staples Sweden (TG Skrivab) 210
14. Coop Dagligvaruhandel 210
15. Skanska 200
16. Wexiodisk 185

(as of 2010-12-15:)

== Environmental work ==
Växjö Municipality has a long-term environmental and climate work and has called itself “The Greenest City in Europe” since 2007. It has its foundation in a history of commitment to environmental issues, and goals for a green future. It is a vision shared with the citizens and the local companies.

In 2017 Växjö, was awarded the European Green Leaf Award 2018 by the European Commission. The prize is awarded to cities with less than 100 000 inhabitants that show good results and ambitions in terms of environment and committed to generate green growth.

=== Actions and results ===
In the early 1970s, Lake Trummen was restored with good results. Twenty years later, the same was done with Växjösjön and Södra Bergundasjön. This was done since the lakes suffered from eutrophication. Through dredging, the damaged ecosystems were restored and today the lakes are fully bath-friendly with a rich wildlife. The aim to receive good water quality for the whole lake system continues and in 2014 the Municipal Council decided to take new actions.

In the 1980s, Växjö Energi AB, Veab, began small-scale use of biofuels in district heating. Thus, the heating plant became the first in Sweden to be fueled with biofuels in this way. In the coming decades, the project was expanded and in 2015, after the inauguration of a third co generation power plant, the heat and power production comes almost entirely from renewable sources.

In 1996, Växjö Municipality decided that it would be completely free from fossil fuels, to be achieved by year 2030. Between 1993 and 2015, carbon dioxide emissions in Växjö have decreased by 54%. This while the city has been able to show strong economic growth. In recent years, Växjö has invested a lot in high-rise wood buildings. Today Växjö is one of the cities where you find most ongoing projects of high-rise wood buildings in Sweden.

== International relations ==
=== Twin towns — Sister cities ===
The municipality is twinned with:

- Aabenraa, Denmark
- Almere, Netherlands
- Duluth, Minnesota, United States
- Kalush, Ukraine
- Kaunas, Lithuania
- Lancaster, United Kingdom
- Lohja, Finland
- Pobiedziska, Poland
- Ringerike, Norway
- Schwerin, Germany
- Skagaströnd, Iceland

== See also ==
- List of Kronoberg Governors
- Kronoberg Castle
