= Rottne =

- Location within Kronoberg Location within Sweden
- Coordinates: 57°01′N 14°54′E
- Country: Sweden
- Province: Småland
- County: Kronoberg County
- Municipality: Växjö Municipality

Area
  - Total: 1.88 km^{2} (0.73 sq mi)

Population (31 December 2010)
  - Total: 2,354
  - Density: 1,254/km^{2} (3,250/sq mi)
- Time zone: UTC+1 (CET)
  - Summer (DST): UTC+2 (CEST)

Rottne is a locality situated in Växjö Municipality, Kronoberg County, Sweden with 2,354 inhabitants in 2010.

The forestry company Rottne Industri has its headquarters and a production facility in the town.
