= Lars Ljungberg =

Swedish musician (born 1977)

- Born: 6 March 1977 (age 49); Huddinge, Sweden
- Occupation: musician
- Instrument: bass

Lars "Leari" Ljungberg (born 6 March 1977 in Huddinge, Sweden) is a Swedish musician and bass player of the alternative rock/glam rock band The Ark.

He started out as a studio and touring musician for artists such as soul singer Titiyo. In 1999 he went on an 8-month tour with The Cardigans due to Magnus Sveningsson, the band's regular bass player, being injured. In autumn and winter 2008–09 Ljungberg was employed as a bassist in the rock opera Jesus Christ Superstar at the Malmö opera.

He is also a member of The Ark side-project, the disco/glam rock crossover band Stereo Explosion.

== Personal life ==
Ljungberg was born just outside Stockholm, Sweden and grew up in Saudi Arabia, South Korea and Växjö, Sweden.

His mother is Egyptian of Beja/Nubian descent and father is Swedish.
