= Ola Salo =

Swedish rock musician

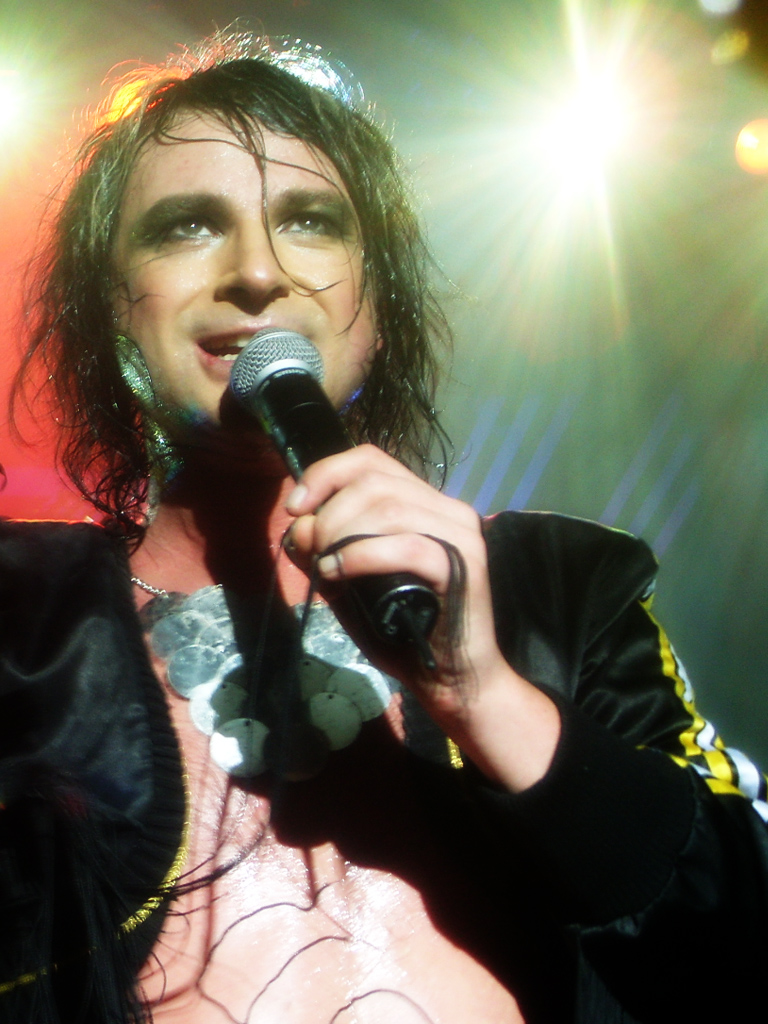
- Salo in 2007

Background information
- Born: Rolf Ola Anders Svensson; 19 February 1977 (age 49)
- Origin: Avesta, Sweden
- Genres: Glam rock; electronica
- Occupations: Singer songwriter keyboardist
- Instruments: Vocals, piano, guitar, harmonica
- Years active: 1991–present
- Label: Roxy
- Member of: The Ark

Ola Salo (born Rolf Ola Anders Svensson; 19 February 1977) is a Swedish rock musician, lead vocalist of Swedish glam rock band The Ark.

== Biography ==
=== Early life ===
He was born in Avesta, Dalarna County, in the Dalarna province of Sweden, and raised in Rottne, a locality in Växjö Municipality, Kronoberg County, Småland province, when he was a child. It was just there that in 1991 he and his friends "Jepson" and "Leari" officially founded what would be their band The Ark.

=== Career ===
Ola Salo and the other members of the band had an international breakthrough in 2000 with the album We Are The Ark, whose second single was the signature song "It Takes a Fool to Remain Sane" (for which Salo won a Grammis for "Song of the Year"), a song the musician wrote after watching the Danish film Idioterne ("The Idiots").

In October 2006, during a party celebrating the new Swedish embassy in Washington, D.C., The Ark was performing on stage. As a plane was flying very low overhead Salo said "In this country, you don't know where those planes are headed. Well, this one seems to be heading in the right direction anyway..." meaning the airport, but then suddenly adding "...to the White House", which happened to be in that direction.

This caused controversy as many newspapers reported that Salo had "wished an airplane to crash into the White House". Salo later said that it was a bad joke, "totally unserious way of being cheeky toward the White House" and not a political statement. The band ended up cancelling almost its entire U.S. tour.

On 10 March 2007, Salo and his band The Ark won Melodifestivalen 2007 and went on to represent Sweden in the Eurovision Song Contest 2007 with the song "The Worrying Kind", with whom they arrive 18th with 51 points.

In 2008, Salo translated Andrew Lloyd Webber's Jesus Christ Superstar into Swedish for a performance in Malmö where he played the role of Jesus, and as a result he stated that "2008 will be a very quiet year" for The Ark after a hectic 2007 with the Eurovision Song Contest of that year and the release of Prayer for the Weekend. In 2009 Salo featured on the Empire Dogs' album, Come On You Preachers.

In 2015 he released his solo studio album, Wilderness. In 2018, he participated in the first season of Stjärnornas stjärna on TV4.

In 2019, Salo opened his headline residency It takes a fool to remain sane in the Rondo of Liseberg amusement Park, in Gothenburg, directed by Edward af Sillén.

=== Personal life ===
Salo is openly bisexual. On November 27, 2009 he married his girlfriend Anneli Pekula, who gave him two children, in 2010 and in 2015.

== Discography ==
=== Albums ===
Year	Album	Peak positions	Certification
Year	Album	SWE	Certification
2015	Wilderness	2	
